= Blair Atcheynum =

Canadian ice hockey player (born 1969)

- Born: April 20, 1969 (age 57) Estevan, Saskatchewan, Canada
- Height: 6 ft 2 in (188 cm)
- Weight: 210 lb (95 kg; 15 st 0 lb)
- Position: Right wing
- Shot: Right
- Played for: Ottawa Senators; Nashville Predators; St. Louis Blues; Chicago Blackhawks
- NHL draft: 52nd overall, 1989; Hartford Whalers
- Playing career: 1989–2001

Blair Michael Atcheynum (born April 20, 1969) is a Canadian former professional ice hockey right winger. Atcheynum from Sweetgrass First Nation is of Cree descent. He played major junior ice hockey with the Saskatoon Blades, Swift Current Broncos before starring with the Moose Jaw Warriors of the Western Hockey League. He was selected by the Hartford Whalers of the National Hockey League (NHL) in the third round, 52nd overall, in the 1989 NHL entry draft. He never played in the NHL for the franchise, spending the first three years of his professional career in the minor leagues, winning the Calder Cup with the Springfield Indians in 1991. He was selected by the Ottawa Senators in the 1992 NHL expansion draft and made his NHL debut in the following 1992–93 season. He returned to the minor leagues for the next five seasons, winning the Calder Cup again in 1997 with the Hershey Bears, before really breaking into the NHL on a regular basis in the 1997–98 season with the St. Louis Blues. He also played with the Nashville Predators and the Chicago Blackhawks before finishing his career in the minors, retiring after the 2000–01 season.

He has supported the Aboriginal Role Model Hockey School in Saskatoon, Saskatchewan, and was an assistant coach with the minor ice hockey team Battlefords North Stars of the Saskatchewan Junior Hockey League.

== Playing career ==
=== Amateur ===
Atcheynum played minor ice hockey with the North Battleford North Stars of the Saskatchewan Junior Hockey League (SJHL). Atcheynum joined the Saskatoon Blades of the Western Hockey League (WHL) to play major junior ice hockey in the 1985–86 season. He had an impressive training camp with the team ahead of the season, which was a rebuilding one for the Blades as four of the team's five top scorers had graduated. However, after 19 games with the Blades, having scored one goal and four assists for five points, Atcheynum was returned to North Battleford for the remainder of the season. He rejoined the Blades for the 1986–87 season. Shortly into the season, Atcheynum suffered a strained shoulder. He returned on November 7 after missing five games. He appeared in 21 games with Saskatoon, recording four assists, when he was flipped to the Swift Current Broncos for future considerations after requesting a trade due to concerns over his lack of playing time. Initially it was intended to be just a loan for the season and he would return to Saskatoon. However, WHL commissioner Ed Chynoweth intervened and asked Atcheynum where he wanted to play. He chose the Broncos, believing he was ending up in a good situation. This helped the Broncos, as they had just lost four players in a bus crash on December 30, 1986. Atcheynum played in their first game after the incident on January 9, 1986. He appeared in five games with the Broncos, scoring two goals and three points.

Swift Current had replaced two of the deceased players, but were missing a toughness element that they had lost in the bus crash. Tim Logan of the Moose Jaw Warriors, a multi-positional player capable of playing either forward or as a defenceman who had a reputation for toughness, was placed in the league's compensation pool for the Broncos, whereby if the player was claimed, the Warriors would be awarded compensation. The Warriors believed that he would not be claimed. The Broncos, which had been searching for such a player, selected him and instead of waiting for the league to award compensation, came to an agreement where Atcheynum would go back to the Warriors on January 26. The loss of Logan upset Warriors head coach Greg Kvisle so much that he briefly departed the team, but eventually returned. Graham James, the head coach and general manager of the Broncos, did not think much of Atcheynum as a player at the time. The trade was widely regarded as one of the worst in James' career. Atcheynum appeared in 12 games to finish the season, scoring three goals, but missed time with a shoulder injury. In April, Kvisle resigned after falling out with Warriors general manager Harvey Roy. Under new head coach Jim Harrison, Atcheynum broke out in 1987–88. In January 1988 he was suspended for two games for receiving a gross misconduct penalty in a match against the Brandon Wheat Kings. On February 28, he received the WHL player of the week award, having notched eight goals and nine points in three games. Playing alongside Theoren Fleury towards the end of the season, Atcheynum netted 32 goals and 48 points in 60 games.

In his final season with the Warriors in 1988–89, Kvisle returned as head coach and Atcheynum was one of only four players remaining from his previous stint. Atcheynum, now a star player and leader for the team now that Fleury had graduated, had a 22-game point streak end in December. He was named the November WHL Player of the Month for the East Division. Playing on the team's top line with Rob Harvey and Jerome Bechard, Atcheynum was named the WHL's player of the month for the East Division again for January 1989. He was named the team's most valuable player of the year, and then later, the East Division player of the year. He was runner up as league player of the year to Dennis Holland and was awarded the Brad Hornung Trophy as the league's most sportsmanlike player and was named to the WHL's First All-Star Team. On March 12, he tied Fleury's franchise record for most goals of the season with his 68th marker. He finished the season having more than doubled his previous career highs, scoring 70 goals and 138 points in 71 games, leading the team in scoring, and established the new franchise record for most goals in a season. The Warriors spent most of the season at the bottom of the standings, but after the acquisition of goaltender Stan Reddick, they made the 1989 WHL playoffs and faced the Medicine Hat Tigers in the first round. The Warriors swept the Tigers in a best-of-five series, winning three games and advanced to face the Broncos, where they were swept in turn in a best-of-seven series, 4–0. Atcheynum played in all seven games, recording two goals and seven points.

=== Professional ===
==== Hartford Whalers ====
In his first year of eligibility for the National Hockey League (NHL)'s entry draft in 1988, he was not selected. Ahead of the 1989 NHL entry draft, the NHL Central Scouting Bureau had Atcheynum rated in the seventh round, though by mid-season he had jumped up to the fourth round. Atcheynum was selected in the third round, 52nd overall, by the Hartford Whalers in the 1989 draft. Whalers general manager Ed Johnston stated at the draft that Atcheynum would start with their American Hockey League (AHL) affiliate, the Binghamton Whalers for the 1989–90 season. He signed a two-year contract with an extra option year. He impressed in training camp with Hartford, but the intention was always to give him more time in the AHL. After being assigned to Binghamton, he scored his first professional goal against the Moncton Hawks on October 11. He only scored two goals through his first 20 games. However, he turned his play around and in his first season, was considered the sixth best prospect in the Whalers system. He finished the campaign recording 20 goals and 41 points in 78 games. Despite Atcheynum's decent rookie season, the Binghamton Whalers set AHL records for most losses, least wins, and least points in the standings in the history of the league. As a result, Binghamton and Hartford ended their affiliation.

Atcheynum was assigned to the Whalers' new AHL affiliate, the Springfield Indians for the 1990–91 season. He missed time after the Capital District Islanders' Dean Chynoweth elbowed him in the head on January 13, 1990, giving him a concussion. The Indians won their division and made the 1990 Calder Cup playoffs. They advanced to the final, defeating the Rochester Americans to win the Calder Cup. Atcheynum was instrumental in the game winner of the series clinching win, setting up Michel Picard after stealing the puck from Americans' goaltender David Littman. Atcheynum scored 25 goals and 52 points in 78 regular season games and added six assists in 13 playoff games. In August 1991, it was announced that Atcheynum signed a multi-year contract extension with Hartford. He made improvements to his defensive game while maintaining his offence in the previous season. He attended the Whalers' training camp and was considered a long shot to make the team. He was assigned to Springfield in September and spent the rest of the season in the AHL, notching 16 goals and 37 points in 62 games. He missed some time with a sprained knee. Springfield made the 1992 Calder Cup playoffs and Atcheynum was scratched from the lineup by head coach Jay Leach in the first game of their first round series with Capital District. However, they defeated the Islanders and advanced to the semifinals where they were eliminated by the Adirondack Red Wings. In six playoff games, Atcheynum added one goal and two points.

==== Ottawa Senators ====
In the 1992 offseason, the NHL expanded by two teams, the Ottawa Senators and the Tampa Bay Lightning. Atcheynum was among the players left unprotected by the Whalers ahead of the 1992 NHL expansion draft. He was selected by Ottawa with the team's final pick in the draft. He was chosen as part of Ottawa's general manager Mel Bridgman's expansion draft strategy of acquiring talented young players who had yet to break out into the NHL. Atcheynum attended Ottawa's training camp, but failed to make the team and was assigned to the Senators' AHL affiliate, the New Haven Senators to start the 1992–93 season. He suffered a broken rib and a punctured kidney, keeping him out of the lineup for two months until early January 1993. He got his first NHL recall on January 18, joining defenceman Kent Paynter on the trip to Ottawa. He made his NHL debut on January 19 in a 5–2 loss to the Quebec Nordiques. In the next game on January 21 against the Minnesota North Stars, Atcheynum recorded his first NHL point, assisting on Mike Peluso's third period goal in a 7–2 loss. Atcheynum appeared in two more games, going scoreless, before being sent back to New Haven on January 28. He finished the season with New Haven, recording 16 goals and 54 points in 51 games. At the end of the season, he was offered a termination contract by new Ottawa general manager Randy Sexton. (Note: A termination contract allowed the player to seek a better position/contract with another team while still having a one-year contract with the original team for the upcoming season.)

==== Minor leagues ====
Atcheynum did not return to Ottawa and spent the 1993–94 season split between the Columbus Chill of the East Coast Hockey League where he appeared in 16 games, scoring 15 goals and 27 points in 1993, making an appearance in an exhibition game for the Providence Bruins, before joining the Portland Pirates of the AHL in January 1994 on a professional tryout contract. He appeared in two games with the Pirates going scoreless, before being returned to Columbus, who immediately loaned him to the Springfield Indians, which had been depleted by injuries. He played in 40 games with Springfield, scoring 18 goals and 40 points. The team made the 1994 Calder Cup playoffs and faced the Adirondack Red Wings in the first round. Springfield was eliminated in six games, with Atcheynum adding two assists in the series.

He moved to the International Hockey League (IHL) for the 1994–95 season, signing a 25-game contract with the option of an extension with the Minnesota Moose in September 1994. He played in 17 games, scoring four goals and 10 points before being cut loose in November. He joined the Worcester IceCats of the AHL in December on a 25-game contract, replacing the injured Lindsay Vallis in the lineup. Springfield's franchise had relocated to Worcester in the offseason, so much of the staff and players were familiar to Atcheynum from previous seasons. In 55 games with Worcester, he recorded 17 goals and 46 points. Worcester finished last in the division and out of the playoffs. On the move again after Worcester found a new affiliation, Atcheynum signed with the Cape Breton Oilers of the AHL for the 1995–96 season in September 1995. In 79 appearances for Cape Breton, he scored 30 goals and 72 points, however, the Oilers just missed making the playoffs. Moving on again, Atcheynum signed with the Hershey Bears of the AHL in July 1996. Playing on the top line with Éric Veilleux and Mike McHugh, Athcheynum led the team in scoring for the 1996–97 season, recording 42 goals and 87 points in 77 games and finished eighth in the league. The Bears made the 1997 Calder Cup playoffs and advanced to the Calder Cup finals. Atcheynum missed the entire third round with a pinched nerve in his back and half the finals, returning only in Game 4. The Bears defeated the Hamilton Bulldogs in five games to win the Calder Cup. It was revealed after the win that Atcheynum had actually missed time due to a broken ankle not a pinched nerve, a lie perpetrated by the Bears' head coach Bob Hartley to protect Atcheynum from opposition players' targeting the sore area. Atcheynum was named to the AHL's First All-Star Team for 1996–97.

==== St. Louis Blues and Nashville Predators ====
Atcheynum signed an NHL contract with the St. Louis Blues in August 1997, though still under contract with the Bears. A lack of depth on the Blues' roster allowed Atcheynum to earn an NHL spot. He made his Blues debut on October 11 in a 5–3 win over the Florida Panthers, adding his first point for St. Louis when he assisted on Pavol Demitra's shorthanded goal in the third period. He scored his first NHL goal on November 1 in a 2–0 victory over the San Jose Sharks. He played in 61 games, scoring 11 goals and 26 points during the 1997–98 NHL season. Atcheynum typically played on a line with Craig Conroy and Scott Pellerin that was fondly referred to as the "CPA Line". The "CPA Line", considered St. Louis' most effective defensive forward line, was used to shut down top opposition lines. Blues general manager Larry Pleau was impressed by Atcheynum's hard work, saying "Blair's not a player in the bottom third of our roster. He's one of our first nine forwards. He can move up to the first or second line without missing a step if we need him". The Blues made the 1998 Stanley Cup playoffs and faced the Los Angeles Kings in the first round. Atcheynum appeared in his first NHL playoff game on April 23, an 8–3 victory for St. Louis. The Blues eliminated the Kings and advanced to the second round where they faced the Detroit Red Wings. The Red Wings eliminated the Blues in six games. Atcheynum played in ten playoff games, going scoreless.

In the 1998 offseason, the NHL expanded, adding the Nashville Predators. Atcheynum was among the players left unprotected by the Blues for 1998 NHL expansion draft. He was selected by Nashville as part of a side deal where the Predators would not pick St. Louis' young goaltender Jamie McLennan and the Predators would also receive Darren Turcotte in a trade. He made his Predators debut in their first ever game on October 10, playing on a line with Tom Fitzgerald and Patric Kjellberg. In the next game, he assisted on Denny Lambert's goal in a 3–2 win over the Carolina Hurricanes for his first point in a Predators' uniform. He recorded his first Nashville goal in a 5–4 loss to the Chicago Blackhawks on October 24. On November 7, Atcheynum tore his anterior cruciate ligament in his right knee. He opted against surgery and chose to use a knee brace to help recuperate the injury. He returned to the lineup on December 16 after missing 14 games. He played in 53 games with the Predators, scoring eight goals and 14 points in the 1998–99 season before being traded back to St. Louis on March 23, 1999, for a sixth-round draft pick in the 2000 NHL entry draft at the NHL trade deadline. He made his season debut for St. Louis on March 25 in a 4–1 victory over the Vancouver Canucks. He appeared in 12 regular season games for the Blues, recording two goals and four points. St. Louis qualified for the 1999 Stanley Cup playoffs and faced the Phoenix Coyotes in the first round. Atcheynum scored his first NHL playoff goal on April 25 in a 5–4 loss. The Blues overcame the Coyotes in seven games though, and advanced to the second round where they faced the Dallas Stars. It took six games, but the Blues were ultimately eliminated by the Stars. In 13 playoffs games, Atcheynum notched the one goal and four points.

==== Chicago Blackhawks ====
In the 1999 offseason, the NHL expanded again, this time adding the Atlanta Thrashers. Atcheynum was again left unprotected by the Blues ahead of the 1999 NHL expansion draft. He was not selected by Atlanta, they instead drafted teammate Terry Yake from St. Louis. However, the Blues did not extend a qualifying offer to Atcheynum, making him an unrestricted free agent. He attended the Chicago Blackhawks training camp and earned a contract with them, signing a two-year deal just before the 1999–2000 season began in October. He made his Blackhawks debut in the season-opening game versus the San Jose Sharks, playing on the third line with Wendel Clark and Dean McAmmond. He recorded his first point with the Blackhawks on October 21, assisting on McAmmond's third period goal in a 5–5 tie with the Mighty Ducks of Anaheim. He scored his first goal with Chicago on November 4 in the second period of a 5–4 loss to the Buffalo Sabres. Beginning in February, Atcheynum was a healthy scratch for ten straight games. He appeared in 47 games, scoring five goals and 12 points.

Ahead of the 2000–01 season, Atcheynum was made available in the NHL waiver draft, but was not selected. He failed to make the Blackhawks out of training camp and was assigned to Chicago's AHL affiliate, the Norfolk Admirals. His first stint with Norfolk was brief as he was recalled on October 5, but did not play for the Blackhawks, before being assigned to the Chicago Wolves of the IHL on October 23. He appeared in seven games for the Wolves, scoring one goal, before being recalled again on November 12 to replace the injured Jean-Yves Leroux. He played in 19 games, scoring one goal and three points with the Blackhawks before being returned to Norfolk. In 37 games with Norfolk, he recorded 12 goals and 20 points. Norfolk qualified for the 2001 Calder Cup playoffs, but Atcheynum spent most of their playoff run as a healthy scratch, playing in only four games, going scoreless. Atcheynum retired as a professional hockey player in 2001. He spent the majority of his career in the minor leagues but was able to break into the NHL for a total of 196 games over four seasons.

== Private life ==
Atcheynum is a member of the Cree First Nation. His father was also an ice hockey player.

Atcheynum was an instructor at the Aboriginal Role Models Hockey School in Saskatoon, Saskatchewan, one of the first professional players to volunteer. Atcheynum was an assistant coach with the Battlefords North Stars of the SJHL. He was also honoured at the 2012 First Nation Games, alongside Fred Sasakamoose, who was the first treaty Indian to play in the NHL. Atcheynum and Sasakamoose were recognized as role models at both the summer and winter games as hope for young First Nations athletes.

== Career statistics ==
			Regular season					Playoffs
Season	Team	League	GP	G	A	Pts	PIM	GP	G	A	Pts	PIM
1985–86	Battlefords North Stars	SJHL	33	16	14	30	41	6	2	0	2	6
1985–86	Saskatoon Blades	WHL	19	1	4	5	22	—	—	—	—	—
1986–87	Saskatoon Blades	WHL	21	0	4	4	4	—	—	—	—	—
1986–87	Swift Current Broncos	WHL	5	2	1	3	0	—	—	—	—	—
1986–87	Moose Jaw Warriors	WHL	12	3	0	3	2	—	—	—	—	—
1987–88	Moose Jaw Warriors	WHL	60	32	16	48	52	—	—	—	—	—
1988–89	Moose Jaw Warriors	WHL	71	70	68	138	70	7	2	5	7	13
1989–90	Binghamton Whalers	AHL	78	20	21	41	45	—	—	—	—	—
1990–91	Springfield Indians	AHL	72	25	27	52	42	13	0	6	6	6
1991–92	Springfield Indians	AHL	62	16	21	37	64	6	1	1	2	2
1992–93	New Haven Senators	AHL	51	16	18	34	47	—	—	—	—	—
1992–93	Ottawa Senators	NHL	4	0	1	1	0	—	—	—	—	—
1993–94	Columbus Chill	ECHL	16	15	12	27	10	—	—	—	—	—
1993–94	Portland Pirates	AHL	2	0	0	0	0	—	—	—	—	—
1993–94	Springfield Indians	AHL	40	18	22	40	13	6	0	2	2	0
1994–95	Minnesota Moose	IHL	17	4	6	10	7	—	—	—	—	—
1994–95	Worcester IceCats	AHL	55	17	29	46	26	—	—	—	—	—
1995–96	Cape Breton Oilers	AHL	79	30	42	72	65	—	—	—	—	—
1996–97	Hershey Bears	AHL	77	42	45	87	57	13	6	11	17	6
1997–98	St. Louis Blues	NHL	61	11	15	26	10	10	0	0	0	2
1998–99	Nashville Predators	NHL	53	8	6	14	16	—	—	—	—	—
1998–99	St. Louis Blues	NHL	12	2	2	4	2	13	1	3	4	6
1999–00	Chicago Blackhawks	NHL	47	5	7	12	6	—	—	—	—	—
2000–01	Chicago Wolves	IHL	7	1	0	1	0	—	—	—	—	—
2000–01	Norfolk Admirals	AHL	37	12	8	20	16	4	0	0	0	6
2000–01	Chicago Blackhawks	NHL	19	1	2	3	2	—	—	—	—	—
NHL totals			196	27	33	60	36	23	1	3	4	8

== Awards and honours ==
Award	Year	Ref
WHL
Brad Hornung Trophy	1989	
East First Team All-Star	1989	
AHL
Calder Cup	1991 & 1997	
First All-Star Team	1996–97	

== Bibliography ==
- Cardinal, Will (2008). First Nations Hockey Players. Canada: Eschia Books. ISBN 978-0-9810942-1-2.
- Chaimovitch, Jason, ed. (2023). 2023–2024 American Hockey League Official Guide & Record Book. Springfield, Massachusetts: American Hockey League. OCLC 22147888.
- MacGregor, Roy (1993). Road Games: A Year in the Life of the NHL. Toronto: MacFarlane Walter & Ross. ISBN 0-921912-70-6.
- Marks, Don (2008). They Call Me Chief: Warriors on Ice. Winnipeg, Manitoba: J. Gordon Shillingford Publishing. ISBN 978-1-897289-34-1.
