= John B. Sollenberger Trophy =

US sporting award

The John B. Sollenberger Trophy is given to American Hockey League's leading scorer for the season.

== History ==
The award was named for John B. Sollenberger in 1955. Sollenberger was a long-time contributor to the league as manager and president of the Hershey Bears and former chairman of the board of governors. The award was originally named after Wally Kilrea, who held the AHL's single-season scoring record when the award was instituted 1947–48. That season, the award was renamed in honour of its first recipient, Carl Liscombe, who broke Kilrea's scoring record.

== Winners ==
Season	Player	Team
Wally Kilrea Trophy
1947–48	Carl Liscombe	Providence Reds
Carl Liscombe Trophy
1948–49	Sid Smith	Pittsburgh Hornets
1949–50	Les Douglas	Cleveland Barons
1950–51	Ab DeMarco	Buffalo Bisons
1951–52	Ray Powell	Providence Reds
1952–53	Eddie Olson (1)	Cleveland Barons
1953–54	George Sullivan	Hershey Bears
John B. Sollenberger Trophy
1954–55	Eddie Olson (2)	Cleveland Barons
1955–56	Zellio Toppazzini	Providence Reds
1956–57	Fred Glover (1)	Cleveland Barons
1957–58	Willie Marshall	Hershey Bears
1958–59	Bill Hicke	Rochester Americans
1959–60	Fred Glover (2)	Cleveland Barons
1960–61	Bill Sweeney (1)	Springfield Indians
1961–62	Bill Sweeney (2)	Springfield Indians
1962–63	Bill Sweeney (3)	Springfield Indians
1963–64	Gerry Ehman	Rochester Americans
1964–65	Art Stratton	Buffalo Bisons
1965–66	Dick Gamble	Rochester Americans
1966–67	Gord Labossiere	Quebec Aces
1967–68	Simon Nolet	Quebec Aces
1968–69	Jeannot Gilbert	Hershey Bears
1969–70	Jude Drouin	Montreal Voyageurs
1970–71	Fred Speck	Baltimore Clippers
1971–72	Don Blackburn	Providence Reds
1972–73	Yvon Lambert	Nova Scotia Voyageurs
1973–74	Steve West	New Haven Nighthawks
1974–75	Doug Gibson	Rochester Americans
1975–76	Jean-Guy Gratton	Hershey Bears
1976–77	Andre Peloffy	Springfield Indians
1977–78	Rick Adduono	Rochester Americans
1977–78	Gord Brooks	Philadelphia Firebirds
1978–79	Bernie Johnston	Maine Mariners
1979–80	Norm Dube	Nova Scotia Voyageurs
1980–81	Mark Lofthouse	Hershey Bears
1981–82	Mike Kaszycki	New Brunswick Hawks
1982–83	Ross Yates	Binghamton Whalers
1983–84	Claude Larose	Sherbrooke Jets
1984–85	Paul Gardner (1)	Binghamton Whalers
1985–86	Paul Gardner (2)	Rochester Americans
1986–87	Tim Tookey	Hershey Bears
1987–88	Bruce Boudreau	Springfield Indians
1988–89	Stephan Lebeau	Sherbrooke Canadiens
1989–90	Paul Ysebaert	Utica Devils
1990–91	Kevin Todd	Utica Devils
1991–92	Shaun Van Allen	Cape Breton Oilers
1992–93	Don Biggs	Binghamton Rangers
1993–94	Tim Taylor	Adirondack Red Wings
1994–95	Peter White (1)	Cape Breton Oilers
1995–96	Brad Smyth	Carolina Monarchs
1996–97	Peter White (2)	Philadelphia Phantoms
1997–98	Peter White (3)	Philadelphia Phantoms
1998–99	Domenic Pittis	Rochester Americans
1999–00	Christian Matte	Hershey Bears
2000–01	Derek Armstrong	Hartford Wolf Pack
2001–02	Donald MacLean	St. John's Maple Leafs
2002–03	Steve Maltais	Chicago Wolves
2003–04	Pavel Rosa	Manchester Monarchs
2004–05	Jason Spezza	Binghamton Senators
2005–06	Kirby Law	Houston Aeros
2006–07	Darren Haydar	Chicago Wolves
2007–08	Jason Krog	Chicago Wolves
2008–09	Alexandre Giroux	Hershey Bears
2009–10	Keith Aucoin	Hershey Bears
2010–11	Corey Locke	Binghamton Senators
2011–12	Chris Bourque (1)	Hershey Bears
2012–13	Brandon Pirri	Rockford IceHogs
2013–14	Travis Morin	Texas Stars
2014–15	Brian O'Neill	Manchester Monarchs
2015–16	Chris Bourque (2)	Hershey Bears
2016–17	Kenny Agostino	Chicago Wolves
2017–18	Chris Terry	Laval Rocket
2018–19	Carter Verhaeghe	Syracuse Crunch
2019–20	Sam Anas	Iowa Wild
2020–21	Andrew Poturalski (1)	San Diego Gulls
2021–22	Andrew Poturalski (2)	Chicago Wolves
2022–23	Michael Carcone	Tucson Roadrunners
2023–24	Mavrik Bourque	Texas Stars
2024–25	Andrew Poturalski (3)	San Jose Barracuda
2025–26	Jakob Pelletier	Syracuse Crunch
