= Robert W. Clarke Trophy =

American ice hockey award

The Robert W. Clarke Trophy is presented annually to the AHL's champion of the Western Conference during the playoffs. Prior to 1998, it was given to the champion of the Southern Conference/Division.

The award is named after former AHL Chairman of the Board Robert W. Clarke.

== Winners ==
Total awards won
Wins	Team
7	Rochester Americans
6	Chicago Wolves
3	Texas Stars
2	Coachella Valley Firebirds
2	Cornwall Aces
2	Grand Rapids Griffins
2	Houston Aeros
2	Milwaukee Admirals
1	Abbotsford Canucks
1	Hamilton Bulldogs
1	Hershey Bears
1	Lake Erie Monsters
1	Manitoba Moose
1	Philadelphia Phantoms
1	Toronto Marlies
1	Utica Comets
1	Wilkes-Barre/Scranton Penguins

=== Winner by season ===
Key

- ‡ = Eventual Calder Cup champions

Awarded for	Year	Team	Win
Southern Division playoffs champion	1990	Rochester Americans	1
Southern Division playoffs champion	1991	Rochester Americans	2
Southern Division playoffs champion	1992	Rochester Americans	3
Southern Division playoffs champion	1993	Rochester Americans	4
Southern Division playoffs champion	1994	Cornwall Aces	1
Southern Division playoffs champion	1995	Cornwall Aces	2
Southern Conference playoffs champion	1996	Rochester Americans‡	5
Southern Conference playoffs champion	1997	Hershey Bears‡	1
Western Conference playoffs champion	1998	Philadelphia Phantoms‡	1
Western Conference playoffs champion	1999	Rochester Americans	6
Western Conference playoffs champion	2000	Rochester Americans	7
Western Conference playoffs champion	2001	Wilkes-Barre/Scranton Penguins	1
Western Conference playoffs champion	2002	Chicago Wolves‡	1
Western Conference playoffs champion	2003	Houston Aeros‡	1
Western Conference playoffs champion	2004	Milwaukee Admirals‡	1
Western Conference playoffs champion	2005	Chicago Wolves	2
Western Conference playoffs champion	2006	Milwaukee Admirals	2
Western Conference playoffs champion	2007	Hamilton Bulldogs‡	1
Western Conference playoffs champion	2008	Chicago Wolves‡	3
Western Conference playoffs champion	2009	Manitoba Moose	1
Western Conference playoffs champion	2010	Texas Stars	1
Western Conference playoffs champion	2011	Houston Aeros	2
Western Conference playoffs champion	2012	Toronto Marlies	1
Western Conference playoffs champion	2013	Grand Rapids Griffins‡	1
Western Conference playoffs champion	2014	Texas Stars‡	2
Western Conference playoffs champion	2015	Utica Comets	1
Western Conference playoffs champion	2016	Lake Erie Monsters‡	1
Western Conference playoffs champion	2017	Grand Rapids Griffins‡	2
Western Conference playoffs champion	2018	Texas Stars	3
Western Conference playoffs champion	2019	Chicago Wolves	4
Western Conference playoffs champion	2020	Not awarded due to the COVID-19 pandemic	
Western Conference playoffs champion	2021	Not awarded; playoffs not held	
Western Conference playoffs champion	2022	Chicago Wolves‡	5
Western Conference playoffs champion	2023	Coachella Valley Firebirds	1
Western Conference playoffs champion	2024	Coachella Valley Firebirds	2
Western Conference playoffs champion	2025	Abbotsford Canucks‡	1
Western Conference playoffs champion	2026	Chicago Wolves	6
