= 1993 Calder Cup playoffs =

North American ice hockey tournament

Tournament details
- Dates: April 12 – May 30, 1993
- Teams: 12

Final positions
- Champions: Cape Breton Oilers
- Runners-up: Rochester Americans

The 1993 Calder Cup playoffs of the American Hockey League began on April 12, 1993. The twelve teams that qualified, four from each division, played best-of-seven series for division semifinals and division finals. The highest remaining seed received a bye for the third round while the other two remaining teams played a best-of-three series, with the winner advancing to play the bye-team in a best-of-seven series for the Calder Cup. The Calder Cup Final ended on May 30, 1993, with the Cape Breton Oilers defeating the Rochester Americans four games to one to win the first Calder Cup in team history.

Cape Breton's Bill McDougall won the Jack A. Butterfield Trophy as AHL playoff MVP. He also set or tied five individual AHL playoff records during Cape Breton's Calder Cup run. He set the records for most points in one playoff (52; 26 goals, 26 assists), most goals scored in one playoff (26), and the most goals scored in one game with 5 in Cape Breton's 8-2 win over St. John's in game 4 of the Atlantic division final. McDougall also set the record for most assists in one playoff with 26, which has been matched twice since then. He also scored 7 points (4 goals, 3 assists) in game 2 of the semifinal against Springfield, tying an AHL record for most points in one playoff game. Cape Breton also tied an AHL playoff record by scoring 85 goals during the 1993 playoffs, and they managed to do it in one fewer game than the Sherbrooke Canadiens, who scored 85 goals during the 1987 Calder Cup Playoffs.

== Playoff seeds ==
After the 1992-93 AHL regular season, 12 teams qualified for the playoffs. The top four teams from each division qualified for the playoffs. The Binghamton Rangers finished the regular season with the best overall record.

=== Atlantic Division ===
1. St. John's Maple Leafs - 95 points
2. Fredericton Canadiens - 87 points
3. Cape Breton Oilers - 84 points
4. Moncton Hawks - 78 points

=== Northern Division ===
1. Providence Bruins - 94 points
2. Adirondack Red Wings - 81 points
3. Capital District Islanders - 80 points
4. Springfield Indians - 64 points

=== Southern Division ===
1. Binghamton Rangers - 124 points
2. Rochester Americans - 87 points
3. Utica Devils - 77 points
4. Baltimore Skipjacks - 68 points

== Bracket ==
Division semifinals
A1	St. John's	4
A4	Moncton	1
Atlantic Division
A2	Fredericton	1
A3	Cape Breton	4
N1	Providence	2
N4	Springfield	4
Northern Division
N2	Adirondack	4
N3	Capital District	0
S1	Binghamton	4
S4	Baltimore	3
Southern Division
S2	Rochester	4
S3	Utica	3

Division finals
A1	St. John's	0
A3	Cape Breton	4
N4	Springfield	4
N2	Adirondack	3
S1	Binghamton	3
S2	Rochester	4

Semifinals
A3	Cape Breton	2
N4	Springfield	0

Final
S2	Rochester	1
A3	Cape Breton	4

In each round the team that earned more points during the regular season receives home ice advantage, meaning they receive the "extra" game on home-ice if the series reaches the maximum number of games. For the Semifinal round, the team that earned the most points during the regular season out of the three remaining teams receives a bye directly to the Calder Cup Final. There is no set series format due to arena scheduling conflicts and travel considerations.

== Division Semifinals ==
Note: Home team is listed first.

=== Atlantic Division ===
==== (A1) St. John's Maple Leafs vs. (A4) Moncton Hawks ====
April 14	St. John's Maple Leafs	4 - 2	Moncton Hawks

April 17	St. John's Maple Leafs	3 - 2	OT	Moncton Hawks

April 21	Moncton Hawks	5 - 6	St. John's Maple Leafs

April 23	Moncton Hawks	5 - 4	OT	St. John's Maple Leafs

April 26	St. John's Maple Leafs	8 - 2	Moncton Hawks

St. John's won series 4 – 1

==== (A2) Fredericton Canadiens vs. (A3) Cape Breton Oilers ====
April 14	Fredericton Canadiens	4 - 3	2OT	Cape Breton Oilers

April 16	Fredericton Canadiens	2 - 5	Cape Breton Oilers

April 18	Cape Breton Oilers	6 - 5	Fredericton Canadiens

April 20	Cape Breton Oilers	3 - 0	Fredericton Canadiens

April 21	Cape Breton Oilers	6 - 5	OT	Fredericton Canadiens

Cape Breton won series 4 - 1

=== Northern Division ===
==== (N1) Providence Bruins vs. (N4) Springfield Indians ====
April 12	Providence Bruins	2 - 3	Springfield Indians

April 13	Providence Bruins	4 - 5	Springfield Indians

April 16	Springfield Indians	2 - 3	OT	Providence Bruins

April 17	Springfield Indians	0 - 9	Providence Bruins

April 22	Providence Bruins	2 - 4	Springfield Indians

April 24	Springfield Indians	4 - 3	Providence Bruins

Springfield won series 4 – 2

==== (N2) Adirondack Red Wings vs. (N3) Capital District Islanders ====
April 15	Adirondack Red Wings	6 - 2	Capital District Islanders

April 17	Adirondack Red Wings	5 - 3	Capital District Islanders

April 18	Capital District Islanders	0 - 3	Adirondack Red Wings

April 21	Capital District Islanders	1 - 3	Adirondack Red Wings

Adirondack won series 4 - 0

=== Southern Division ===
==== (S1) Binghamton Rangers vs. (S4) Baltimore Skipjacks ====
April 16	Binghamton Rangers	3 - 4	Baltimore Skipjacks

April 17	Binghamton Rangers	6 - 2	Baltimore Skipjacks

April 23	Baltimore Skipjacks	3 - 8	Binghamton Rangers

April 24	Baltimore Skipjacks	3 - 1	Binghamton Rangers

April 26	Baltimore Skipjacks	3 - 4	OT	Binghamton Rangers

April 28	Binghamton Rangers	2 - 6	Baltimore Skipjacks

April 30	Binghamton Rangers	5 - 3	Baltimore Skipjacks

Binghamton won series 4 - 3

==== (S2) Rochester Americans vs. (S3) Utica Devils ====
April 16	Rochester Americans	2 - 3	OT	Utica Devils

April 17	Rochester Americans	9 - 3	Utica Devils

April 20	Utica Devils	4 - 6	Rochester Americans

April 22	Utica Devils	3 - 4	OT	Rochester Americans

April 24	Rochester Americans	3 - 2	Utica Devils

Rochester won series 4 - 1

== Division Finals ==
=== Atlantic Division ===
==== (A1) St. John's Maple Leafs vs. (A3) Cape Breton Oilers ====
April 29	St. John's Maple Leafs	3 - 5	Cape Breton Oilers

May 1	St. John's Maple Leafs	3 - 4	Cape Breton Oilers

May 3	Cape Breton Oilers	5 - 4	St. John's Maple Leafs

May 5	Cape Breton Oilers	8 - 2	St. John's Maple Leafs

Cape Breton won series 4 - 0

=== Northern Division ===
==== (N2) Adirondack Red Wings vs. (N4) Springfield Indians ====
April 28	Adirondack Red Wings	6 - 2	Springfield Indians

April 30	Adirondack Red Wings	1 - 4	Springfield Indians

May 1	Springfield Indians	3 - 4	OT	Adirondack Red Wings

May 5	Springfield Indians	4 - 3	OT	Adirondack Red Wings

May 6	Adirondack Red Wings	7 - 2	Springfield Indians

May 8	Springfield Indians	2 - 1	Adirondack Red Wings

May 11	Adirondack Red Wings	5 - 6	OT	Springfield Indians

Springfield won series 4 - 3

=== Southern Division ===
==== (S1) Binghamton Rangers vs. (S2) Rochester Americans ====
May 3	Binghamton Rangers	2 - 4	Rochester Americans

May 5	Binghamton Rangers	4 - 3	OT	Rochester Americans

May 7	Rochester Americans	5 - 1	Binghamton Rangers

May 9	Rochester Americans	2 - 3	Binghamton Rangers

May 12	Binghamton Rangers	4 - 2	Rochester Americans

May 14	Rochester Americans	7 - 5	Binghamton Rangers

May 17	Binghamton Rangers	2 - 3	Rochester Americans

Rochester won series 4 - 3

== Semifinal ==
=== Bye ===
- (S2) Rochester Americans receive a bye to the Calder Cup Final by virtue of having earned the highest point total in the regular season out of the three remaining teams.

=== (A3) Cape Breton Oilers vs. (N4) Springfield Indians ===
May 14	Springfield Indians	3 - 4	OT	Cape Breton Oilers

May 17	Cape Breton Oilers	9 - 3	Springfield Indians

Cape Breton won series 2 - 0

== Calder Cup Final ==
=== (S2) Rochester Americans vs. (A3) Cape Breton Oilers ===
May 21	Rochester Americans	5 - 4	OT	Cape Breton Oilers

May 23	Rochester Americans	1 - 6	Cape Breton Oilers

May 26	Cape Breton Oilers	5 - 2	Rochester Americans

May 28	Cape Breton Oilers	5 - 3	Rochester Americans

May 30	Cape Breton Oilers	7 - 2	Rochester Americans

Cape Breton won series 4 - 1

== See also ==
- 1992–93 AHL season
- List of AHL seasons

Preceded by 1992 Calder Cup playoffs	Calder Cup playoffs 1993	Succeeded by 1994 Calder Cup playoffs
