= Jason Krog =

Canadian ice hockey player (born 1975)

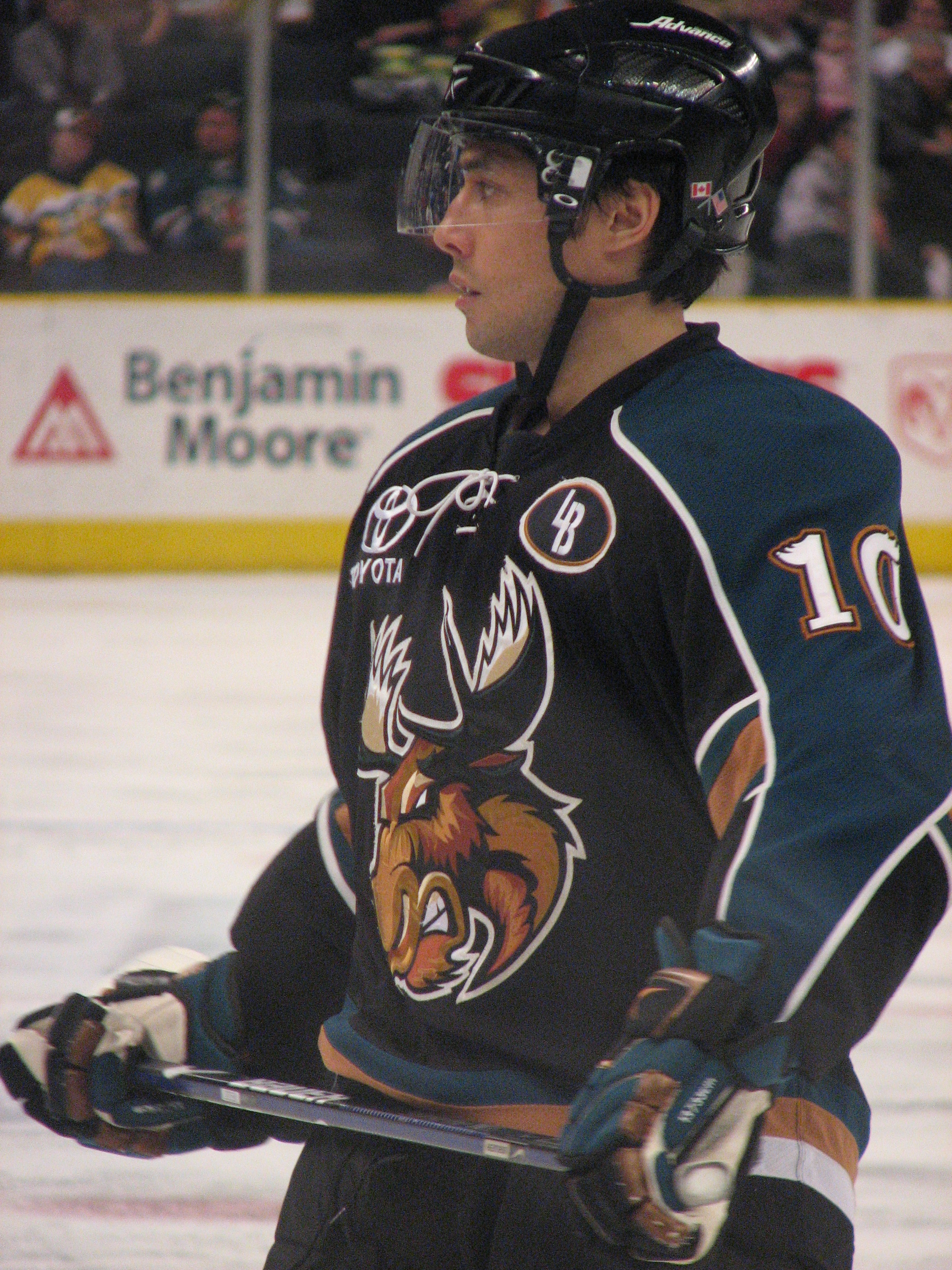
- Krog with the Manitoba Moose in 2009
- Born: October 9, 1975 (age 50) Fernie, British Columbia, Canada
- Height: 5 ft 11 in (180 cm)
- Weight: 191 lb (87 kg; 13 st 9 lb)
- Position: Centre
- Shot: Right
- Played for: New York Islanders; Mighty Ducks of Anaheim; EC VSV; Genève-Servette HC; Frölunda HC; Atlanta Thrashers; New York Rangers; Vancouver Canucks; HV71; KHL Medveščak Zagreb; Dragons de Rouen; Lørenskog IK
- NHL draft: Undrafted
- Playing career: 1999–2017

Jason Krog (born October 9, 1975) is a Canadian former professional ice hockey centre, last under contract with Lørenskog IK in the Norwegian GET-ligaen (GET). He has been the skills and skating coach with the Vancouver Canucks since June 10, 2024.

== Playing career ==
A native of British Columbia, Krog began his junior career in the BCJHL with the Chilliwack Chiefs. He played with the Chiefs for three seasons, culminating in a 128-point season in 1994–95. The following season, he began a four-year tenure with the University of New Hampshire, notching 238 points (94 goals, 144 assists) in 152 games from 1995 to 1999. In 1998–99, Krog was awarded the Hobey Baker Award as the top collegiate hockey player.

Undrafted, he was signed as a free agent by the New York Islanders on May 14, 1999. For three seasons, Krog mostly played in the American Hockey League with the Islanders' minor league affiliates. In 2001–02, Krog finished second in team scoring on the Bridgeport Sound Tigers despite only playing in 64 games. In the playoffs, he accumulated 23 points in 20 games, helping Bridgeport to the Calder Cup Finals where they were defeated by the Chicago Wolves.

The following off-season, on July 17, 2002, he was signed by the Mighty Ducks of Anaheim as a free agent. As a Duck he played 67 games in 2002–03 and posted career highs of 10 goals, 15 assists and 25 points. In the playoffs, Krog played in 21 games as the Mighty Ducks made their way to the finals against the eventual Stanley Cup winners, the New Jersey Devils.

In 2003–04, he played a career-high 80 games with Anaheim before the NHL lockout suspended play the next season. After playing the lockout season with VSV EC of the Austrian Hockey League, tallying 60 points (27 goals, 33 assists) in 48 games, Krog remained in Europe the following season, signing with Genève-Servette HC of Switzerland's Nationalliga A and Frölunda Indians of the Swedish Elite League. He led Genève-Servette with 15 goals and placed second on the club in scoring despite playing in only 29 of their 44 games. On July 4, 2006, Krog returned to the NHL as he was signed by the Atlanta Thrashers. However, after 14 games in Atlanta, he was placed on waivers and picked up on January 12, 2007, by the New York Rangers. Krog played 9 games for the Rangers and he was later reclaimed by Atlanta on February 26.

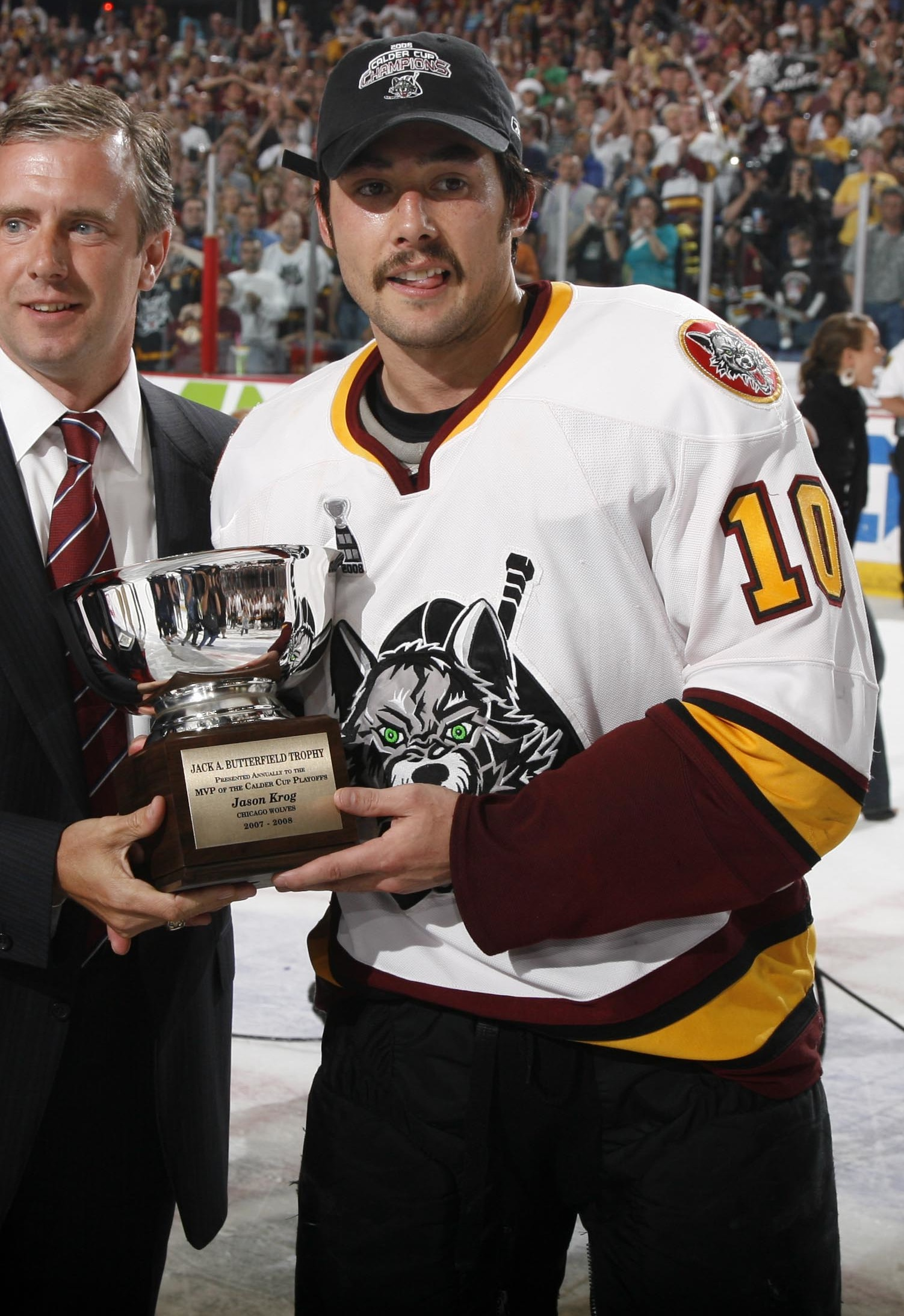
Krog being awarded the Jack A. Butterfield Trophy in 2008

After failing to make the Thrashers' team at the start of the 2007–08 season, Krog was sent down to their minor league affiliate, the Chicago Wolves, which gave Krog a chance to re-energize his career. After scoring 36 goals and 112 points, he captured the John B. Sollenberger Trophy as the league's top point scorer, the Willie Marshall Award as the top goal scorer and the Les Cunningham Award as league MVP. He led the Wolves to a divisional title and their second Calder Cup in seven years. Leading the playoffs in scoring, he also was awarded the Jack A. Butterfield Trophy as playoff MVP. His 26 assists tied the AHL record for the most in a single playoffs (shared with Bill McDougall, 1993; Domenic Pittis, 2000; and Rob Brown, 2002).

On July 11, 2008, he was signed as an unrestricted free agent by the Vancouver Canucks. However, on July 18, Krog and five other players were suspended by the International Ice Hockey Federation pending an investigation regarding simultaneous player contracts with both the NHL and the Russian Kontinental Hockey League. Nevertheless, Krog began the season with the Canucks' AHL affiliate, the Manitoba Moose. He was called up by Vancouver in light of injuries and scored his first goal as a Canuck on October 25, 2008, in a 6–3 win against the Edmonton Oilers. On November 5, he was reassigned to the Manitoba Moose and finished the year with 85 points and earning a selection to the AHL's Second All-Star Team.

On July 3, 2009, he returned to the Atlanta Thrashers organization when he was signed as an unrestricted free agent to a two-year contract. After starting the 2009–10 season with their AHL affiliate, the Chicago Wolves, Krog was recalled to the Thrashers for two games as an offensive replacement after losing Ilya Kovalchuk to injury, but failed to appear in a game. On November 1, he was returned to the Wolves for the duration of the season, leading the team with 61 assists for 75 points.

From 2011 until 2014, he played for HV71 in the SHL, After three seasons with HV71, on June 9, 2014, he signed a one-year contract, along with former Wolves and UNH teammate Darren Haydar in the Kontinental Hockey League with Croatian club KHL Medveščak Zagreb. In the 2014–15 season, Krog recorded just 1 assist in 5 games before opting to leave the club. With Haydar following suit, they both signed tryout contracts with Austrian club EC VSV on October 2, 2014. After showing early scoring touch in Villach, Krog and Haydar both opted to remain, signing one-year contracts on October 15, 2014.

== Coaching career ==
Krog was named the skills and skating coach with the Vancouver Canucks on June 10, 2024. He succeeded Yogi Švejkovský who was promoted to assistant coach five days earlier.

== Records ==
- AHL record; most assists, single playoffs – 26 (2008) (shared with Bill McDougall, 1993; Domenic Pittis, 2000; and Rob Brown, 2002)

== Career statistics ==
			Regular season					Playoffs
Season	Team	League	GP	G	A	Pts	PIM	GP	G	A	Pts	PIM
1992–93	Chilliwack Chiefs	BCHL	52	30	27	57	52	—	—	—	—	—
1993–94	Chilliwack Chiefs	BCHL	42	19	36	55	20	4	0	2	2	2
1994–95	Chilliwack Chiefs	BCHL	60	47	81	128	36	—	—	—	—	—
1995–96	University of New Hampshire	HE	34	4	16	20	20	—	—	—	—	—
1996–97	University of New Hampshire	HE	39	23	44	67	28	—	—	—	—	—
1997–98	University of New Hampshire	HE	38	33	33	66	44	—	—	—	—	—
1998–99	University of New Hampshire	HE	41	34	51	85	38	—	—	—	—	—
1999–2000	Lowell Lock Monsters	AHL	45	6	21	27	22	—	—	—	—	—
1999–2000	New York Islanders	NHL	17	2	4	6	6	—	—	—	—	—
1999–2000	Providence Bruins	AHL	11	9	8	17	4	6	2	2	4	0
2000–01	New York Islanders	NHL	9	0	3	3	0	—	—	—	—	—
2000–01	Lowell Lock Monsters	AHL	26	11	16	27	6	—	—	—	—	—
2000–01	Springfield Falcons	AHL	24	7	23	30	4	—	—	—	—	—
2001–02	New York Islanders	NHL	2	0	0	0	0	—	—	—	—	—
2001–02	Bridgeport Sound Tigers	AHL	64	26	36	62	13	20	10	13	23	8
2002–03	Cincinnati Mighty Ducks	AHL	9	3	4	7	6	—	—	—	—	—
2002–03	Mighty Ducks of Anaheim	NHL	67	10	15	25	12	21	3	1	4	4
2003–04	Mighty Ducks of Anaheim	NHL	80	6	12	18	16	—	—	—	—	—
2004–05	EC VSV	AUT	48	27	33	60	38	3	0	1	1	4
2005–06	Genève–Servette HC	NLA	29	14	14	28	32	—	—	—	—	—
2005–06	Frölunda HC	SEL	7	5	1	6	6	17	5	3	8	10
2006–07	Chicago Wolves	AHL	44	26	54	80	20	15	5	14	19	17
2006–07	Atlanta Thrashers	NHL	14	1	3	4	6	—	—	—	—	—
2006–07	New York Rangers	NHL	9	2	0	2	4	—	—	—	—	—
2007–08	Chicago Wolves	AHL	80	39	73	112	30	24	10	26	36	2
2008–09	Manitoba Moose	AHL	74	30	56	86	30	22	8	15	23	0
2008–09	Vancouver Canucks	NHL	4	1	0	1	2	—	—	—	—	—
2009–10	Chicago Wolves	AHL	78	14	61	75	34	14	5	6	11	6
2010–11	Chicago Wolves	AHL	80	19	56	75	22	—	—	—	—	—
2011–12	HV71	SEL	50	12	28	40	22	6	1	2	3	2
2012–13	HV71	SEL	55	17	26	43	18	5	1	5	6	0
2013–14	HV71	SHL	48	8	8	16	30	8	0	1	1	2
2014–15	KHL Medveščak Zagreb	KHL	5	0	1	1	6	—	—	—	—	—
2014–15	EC VSV	AUT	47	11	27	38	28	5	1	0	1	2
2015–16	Dragons de Rouen	FRA	26	10	24	34	6	15	1	10	11	10
2016–17	Lørenskog IK	NOR	45	21	26	47	14	7	4	3	7	4
AHL totals			535	190	408	598	191	101	43	75	118	39
NHL totals			202	22	37	59	46	21	3	1	4	4
SEL totals			160	41	63	104	76	36	7	11	18	14

== Awards and honours ==
Award	Year
College
All-Hockey East First Team	1996–97
AHCA East Second-Team All-American	1996–97
All-Hockey East First Team	1997–98
All-Hockey East First Team	1998–99
AHCA East First-Team All-American	1998–99
HE Player of the Year	1998–99
Hockey East All-Tournament Team	1999
All-NCAA All-Tournament Team	1999
Hobey Baker Memorial Award	1998–99
AHL
Les Cunningham Award	2008
John B. Sollenberger Trophy	2008
Willie Marshall Award	2008
First All-Star Team	2008
Jack A. Butterfield Trophy	2008
Calder Cup (Chicago Wolves)	2008
Second All-Star Team	2009

Awards and achievements
Preceded by Chris Drury	Hockey East Player of the Year; 1998–99	Succeeded by Ty Conklin, Mike Mottau
Preceded by Marty Reasoner, Tom Nolan	Hockey East Scoring Champion; 1998–99	Succeeded by Cory Larose
Preceded by Marty Reasoner	NCAA Ice Hockey Scoring Champion; 1998–99	Succeeded by Steven Reinprecht
Preceded by Chris Drury	Winner of the Hobey Baker Award; 1998–99	Succeeded by Mike Mottau
