= 1992 Calder Cup playoffs =

North American ice hockey tournament

Tournament details
- Dates: April 7 – May 29, 1992
- Teams: 12

Final positions
- Champions: Adirondack Red Wings
- Runner-up: St. John's Maple Leafs

The 1992 Calder Cup playoffs of the American Hockey League began on April 7, 1992. The twelve teams that qualified, four from each division, played best-of-seven series for division semifinals and division finals. The highest remaining seed received a bye for the third round while the other two remaining teams played a best-of-three series, with the winner advancing to play the bye-team in a best-of-seven series for the Calder Cup. The Calder Cup Final ended on May 29, 1992, with the Adirondack Red Wings defeating the St. John's Maple Leafs four games to three in a series in which the visiting team won every game to win the fourth Calder Cup in team history. Adirondack's Allan Bester won the Jack A. Butterfield Trophy as AHL playoff MVP.

== Playoff seeds ==
After the 1991-92 AHL regular season, twelve teams qualified for the playoffs. The top four teams from each division qualified for the playoffs. The Fredericton Canadiens finished the regular season with the best overall record.

=== Atlantic Division ===
1. Fredericton Canadiens - 96 points
2. St. John's Maple Leafs - 90 points
3. Cape Breton Oilers - 82 points
4. Moncton Hawks - 74 points

=== Northern Division ===
1. Springfield Indians - 94 points
2. Adirondack Red Wings - 84 points
3. New Haven Nighthawks - 82 points
4. Capital District Islanders - 75 points

=== Southern Division ===
1. Binghamton Rangers - 91 points
2. Rochester Americans - 86 points
3. Hershey Bears - 83 points
4. Utica Devils - 74 points

== Bracket ==
Division semifinals
A1	Fredericton	3
A4	Moncton	4
Atlantic Division
A2	St. John's	4
A3	Cape Breton	1
N1	Springfield	4
N4	Capital District	3
Northern Division
N2	Adirondack	4
N3	New Haven	1
S1	Binghamton	4
S4	Utica	0
Southern Division
S2	Rochester	4
S3	Hershey	2

Division finals
A4	Moncton	0
A2	St. John's	4
N1	Springfield	0
N2	Adirondack	4
S1	Binghamton	3
S2	Rochester	4

Semifinals
A2	St. John's	2
S2	Rochester	1

Final
A2	St. John's	3
N2	Adirondack	4

In each round the team that earned more points during the regular season receives home ice advantage, meaning they receive the "extra" game on home-ice if the series reaches the maximum number of games. For the Semifinal round, the team that earned the most points during the regular season out of the three remaining teams receives a bye directly to the Calder Cup Final. There is no set series format due to arena scheduling conflicts and travel considerations.

== Division Semifinals ==
Note 1: Home team is listed first.
Note 2: The number of overtime periods played (where applicable) is not specified

=== Atlantic Division ===
==== (A1) Fredericton Canadiens vs. (A4) Moncton Hawks ====
April 7	Fredericton Canadiens	4 - 3	OT	Moncton Hawks

April 8	Moncton Hawks	3 - 0	Fredericton Canadiens

April 13	Fredericton Canadiens	5 - 6	Moncton Hawks

April 15	Moncton Hawks	1 - 2	OT	Fredericton Canadiens

April 17	Fredericton Canadiens	5 - 1	Moncton Hawks

April 19	Moncton Hawks	4 - 3	OT	Fredericton Canadiens

April 21	Fredericton Canadiens	2 - 3	OT	Moncton Hawks

Moncton won series 4 – 3

==== (A2) St. John's Maple Leafs vs. (A3) Cape Breton Oilers ====
April 9	St. John's Maple Leafs	4 - 5	OT	Cape Breton Oilers

April 10	St. John's Maple Leafs	9 - 5	Cape Breton Oilers

April 12	Cape Breton Oilers	4 - 5	St. John's Maple Leafs

April 14	Cape Breton Oilers	4 - 5	OT	St. John's Maple Leafs

April 16	St. John's Maple Leafs	3 - 2	OT	Cape Breton Oilers

St. John's won series 4 - 1

=== Northern Division ===
==== (N1) Springfield Indians vs. (N4) Capital District Islanders ====
April 8	Springfield Indians	1 - 4	Capital District Islanders

April 10	Springfield Indians	4 - 3	Capital District Islanders

April 11	Capital District Islanders	4 - 5	OT	Springfield Indians

April 14	Capital District Islanders	5 - 3	Springfield Indians

April 17	Springfield Indians	5 - 2	Capital District Islanders

April 18	Capital District Islanders	6 - 3	Springfield Indians

April 22	Springfield Indians	5 - 1	Capital District Islanders

Springfield won series 4 – 3

==== (N2) Adirondack Red Wings vs. (N3) New Haven Nighthawks ====
April 9	Adirondack Red Wings	6 - 4	New Haven Nighthawks

April 11	Adirondack Red Wings	5 - 2	New Haven Nighthawks

April 15	New Haven Nighthawks	6 - 4	Adirondack Red Wings

April 17	New Haven Nighthawks	3 - 4	OT	Adirondack Red Wings

April 18	Adirondack Red Wings	4 - 1	New Haven Nighthawks

Adirondack won series 4 - 1

=== Southern Division ===
==== (S1) Binghamton Rangers vs. (S4) Utica Devils ====
April 10	Binghamton Rangers	5 - 3	Utica Devils

April 12	Utica Devils	5 - 6	OT	Binghamton Rangers

April 15	Binghamton Rangers	4 - 3	Utica Devils

April 17	Utica Devils	4 - 6	Binghamton Rangers

Binghamton won series 4 - 0

==== (S2) Rochester Americans vs. (S3) Hershey Bears ====
April 8	Rochester Americans	4 - 3	OT	Hershey Bears

April 10	Rochester Americans	4 - 3	Hershey Bears

April 12	Hershey Bears	3 - 5	Rochester Americans

April 15	Hershey Bears	5 - 4	OT	Rochester Americans

April 17	Rochester Americans	1 - 2	Hershey Bears

April 18	Hershey Bears	0 - 2	Rochester Americans

Rochester won series 4 - 2

== Division Finals ==
=== Atlantic Division ===
==== (A2) St. John's Maple Leafs vs. (A4) Moncton Hawks ====
April 24	St. John's Maple Leafs	8 - 4	Moncton Hawks

April 26	St. John's Maple Leafs	6 - 5	Moncton Hawks

April 28	Moncton Hawks	2 - 4	St. John's Maple Leafs

April 30	Moncton Hawks	2 - 8	St. John's Maple Leafs

St. John's won series 4 - 0

=== Northern Division ===
==== (N1) Springfield Indians vs. (N2) Adirondack Red Wings ====
April 25	Springfield Indians	3 - 5	Adirondack Red Wings

April 27	Adirondack Red Wings	2 - 0	Springfield Indians

April 28	Springfield Indians	1 - 2	Adirondack Red Wings

May 3	Adirondack Red Wings	4 - 1	Springfield Indians

Adirondack won series 4 - 0

Minor league star Bruce Boudreau played his final game in this series, appearing for Adirondack as an emergency injury replacement in the third and fourth matches.

=== Southern Division ===
==== (S1) Binghamton Rangers vs. (S2) Rochester Americans ====
April 24	Binghamton Rangers	6 - 1	Rochester Americans

April 26	Rochester Americans	4 - 2	Binghamton Rangers

April 29	Binghamton Rangers	3 - 1	Rochester Americans

May 2	Rochester Americans	2 - 4	Binghamton Rangers

May 3	Binghamton Rangers	2 - 4	Rochester Americans

May 6	Rochester Americans	4 - 3	Binghamton Rangers

May 8	Binghamton Rangers	2 - 4	Rochester Americans

Rochester won series 4 - 3

== Semifinal ==
=== Bye ===
- (A2) St. John's Maple Leafs receive a bye to the Calder Cup Final by virtue of having earned the highest point total in the regular season out of the three remaining teams.

=== (S2) Rochester Americans vs. (N2) Adirondack Red Wings ===
May 11	Adirondack Red Wings	3 - 2	Rochester Americans

May 13	Rochester Americans	3 - 2	Adirondack Red Wings

May 15	Rochester Americans	3 - 5	Adirondack Red Wings

Adirondack won series 2 - 1

== Calder Cup Final ==
=== (A2) St. John's Maple Leafs vs. (N2) Adirondack Red Wings ===
May 18	St. John's Maple Leafs	3 - 6	Adirondack Red Wings

May 20	St. John's Maple Leafs	4 - 7	Adirondack Red Wings

May 22	Adirondack Red Wings	3 - 4	St. John's Maple Leafs

May 23	Adirondack Red Wings	1 - 4	St. John's Maple Leafs

May 25	St. John's Maple Leafs	1 - 3	Adirondack Red Wings

May 27	Adirondack Red Wings	2 - 5	St. John's Maple Leafs

May 29	St. John's Maple Leafs	2 - 5	Adirondack Red Wings

Adirondack won series 4 - 3

== See also ==
- 1991–92 AHL season
- List of AHL seasons

Preceded by 1991 Calder Cup playoffs	Calder Cup playoffs 1992	Succeeded by 1993 Calder Cup playoffs
