= Kevin Todd =

Canadian former ice hockey forward (born 1968)

- Born: May 4, 1968 (age 58) Winnipeg, Manitoba, Canada
- Height: 5 ft 10 in (178 cm)
- Weight: 175 lb (79 kg; 12 st 7 lb)
- Position: Centre
- Shot: Left
- Played for: New Jersey Devils; Edmonton Oilers; Chicago Blackhawks; Los Angeles Kings; Mighty Ducks of Anaheim
- NHL draft: 129th overall, 1986; New Jersey Devils
- Playing career: 1988–1999

Kevin Todd (born May 4, 1968) is a Canadian former ice hockey forward who played in the National Hockey League (NHL).

Todd started his NHL career with the New Jersey Devils in 1988–89. He also played for the Edmonton Oilers, Chicago Blackhawks, Los Angeles Kings, and Mighty Ducks of Anaheim. He left the NHL after the 1997–98 season and spent one season in Switzerland for EV Zug before retiring after a career ending neck injury.

Todd won the AHL's Les Cunningham Award and John B. Sollenberger Trophy 1990-91 season. He broke the New Jersey Devils rookie scoring record previously held by Kirk Muller, but since broken by Scott Gomez.

== Career statistics ==
			Regular season					Playoffs
Season	Team	League	GP	G	A	Pts	PIM	GP	G	A	Pts	PIM
1985–86	Prince Albert Raiders	WHL	55	14	25	39	19	20	7	6	13	29
1986–87	Prince Albert Raiders	WHL	71	39	46	85	92	8	2	5	7	17
1987–88	Prince Albert Raiders	WHL	72	49	72	121	83	10	8	11	19	27
1988–89	New Jersey Devils	NHL	1	0	0	0	0	—	—	—	—	—
1988–89	Utica Devils	AHL	78	26	45	71	62	—	—	—	—	—
1989–90	Utica Devils	AHL	71	18	36	54	72	5	2	4	6	2
1990–91	New Jersey Devils	NHL	1	0	0	0	0	1	0	0	0	6
1990–91	Utica Devils	AHL	75	37	81	118	75	—	—	—	—	—
1991–92	New Jersey Devils	NHL	80	21	42	63	69	7	3	2	5	8
1992–93	New Jersey Devils	NHL	30	5	5	10	16	—	—	—	—	—
1992–93	Utica Devils	AHL	2	2	1	3	0	—	—	—	—	—
1992–93	Edmonton Oilers	NHL	25	4	9	13	10	—	—	—	—	—
1993–94	Chicago Blackhawks	NHL	35	5	6	11	8	—	—	—	—	—
1993–94	Los Angeles Kings	NHL	12	3	8	11	8	—	—	—	—	—
1994–95	Utica Blizzard	CoHL	2	1	3	4	0	—	—	—	—	—
1994–95	Los Angeles Kings	NHL	33	3	8	11	12	—	—	—	—	—
1995–96	Los Angeles Kings	NHL	74	16	27	43	38	—	—	—	—	—
1996–97	Mighty Ducks of Anaheim	NHL	65	9	21	30	44	4	0	0	0	2
1997–98	Mighty Ducks of Anaheim	NHL	27	4	7	11	12	—	—	—	—	—
1997–98	Long Beach Ice Dogs	IHL	30	18	28	46	54	13	1	10	11	38
1998–99	EV Zug	NLA	40	9	41	50	81	5	0	2	2	2
NHL totals			383	70	133	203	217	12	3	2	5	16
AHL totals			226	83	163	246	209	5	2	4	6	2
