= 1991 Calder Cup playoffs =

North American ice hockey tournament

Tournament details
- Dates: April 2 – May 24, 1991
- Teams: 10

Final positions
- Champions: Springfield Indians
- Runner-up: Rochester Americans

The 1991 Calder Cup playoffs of the American Hockey League began on April 2, 1991. Ten teams, five from each division, qualified for the playoffs. The top three teams in each division received a bye for the preliminary round while the fourth- and fifth-placed teams in each division played a two-game series with the winners advancing to the Division Semifinals; if each team won one game, the series winner was decided in sudden-death "super overtime" immediately following Game 2. The eight remaining teams then played best-of-seven series for Division Semifinals and Division Finals. The division champions played a best-of-seven series for the Calder Cup. The Calder Cup Final ended on May 24, 1991, with the Springfield Indians defeating the Rochester Americans four games to two to win the Calder Cup for the second consecutive year, and the seventh and final time in team history. This was a rematch of the 1990 Calder Cup Final where Springfield defeated Rochester four games to two. Similarly, a Springfield goaltender—this time Kay Whitmore—won the Jack A. Butterfield Trophy as the MVP of the playoffs. This would be the last time until 2024 that the final was a rematch of the previous year's final.

== Playoff seeds ==
After the 1990–91 AHL regular season, the top five teams from each division qualified for the playoffs. The Rochester Americans finished the regular season with the best overall record.

=== Northern Division ===
1. Springfield Indians - 96 points
2. Cape Breton Oilers - 90 points
3. Moncton Hawks - 84 points
4. Fredericton Canadiens - 81 points
5. Maine Mariners - 80 points

=== Southern Division ===
1. Rochester Americans - 99 points
2. Binghamton Rangers - 94 points
3. Baltimore Skipjacks - 85 points
4. Hershey Bears - 78 points
5. Adirondack Red Wings - 76 points

== Bracket ==
Preliminary Round
4	Fredericton	1
5	Maine	1
4	Hershey	1
5	Adirondack	1

Division Semifinals
1	Springfield	4
4	Fredericton	3
Northern Division
2	Cape Breton	0
3	Moncton	4
2	Binghamton	4
3	Baltimore	2
Southern Division
1	Rochester	4
4	Hershey	1

Division Finals
1	Springfield	4
3	Moncton	1
2	Binghamton	0
1	Rochester	4

Calder Cup Final
N1	Springfield	4
S1	Rochester	2

In the preliminary round, the fourth-placed team is the home team for both games of the two-game series. In each subsequent round, the team that earned more points during the regular season receives home ice advantage, meaning they receive the "extra" game on home-ice if the series reaches the maximum number of games. There is no set series format due to arena scheduling conflicts and travel considerations.

== Preliminary round ==
Note: Home team is listed first.

=== Northern Division ===
==== (4) Fredericton Canadiens vs. (5) Maine Mariners ====
April 2	Fredericton Canadiens	7 - 2	Maine Mariners

April 3	Fredericton Canadiens	4 - 5	Maine Mariners

Fredericton won in "super overtime"

=== Southern Division ===
==== (4) Hershey Bears vs. (5) Adirondack Red Wings ====
April 2	Hershey Bears	2 - 3	OT	Adirondack Red Wings

April 3	Hershey Bears	11 - 1	Adirondack Red Wings

Hershey won in "super overtime"

== Division Semifinals ==
=== Northern Division ===
==== (1) Springfield Indians vs. (4) Fredericton Canadiens ====
April 6	Springfield Indians	3 - 4	OT	Fredericton Canadiens

April 8	Springfield Indians	8 - 2	Fredericton Canadiens

April 12	Fredericton Canadiens	5 - 4	OT	Springfield Indians

April 14	Fredericton Canadiens	4 - 1	Springfield Indians

April 16	Springfield Indians	2 - 1	OT	Fredericton Canadiens

April 18	Fredericton Canadiens	2 - 4	Springfield Indians

April 20	Springfield Indians	6 - 3	Fredericton Canadiens

Springfield won series 4 – 3

==== (2) Cape Breton Oilers vs. (3) Moncton Hawks ====
April 5	Cape Breton Oilers	4 - 5	OT	Moncton Hawks

April 6	Cape Breton Oilers	4 - 6	Moncton Hawks

April 8	Moncton Hawks	5 - 4	OT	Cape Breton Oilers

April 10	Moncton Hawks	3 - 1	Cape Breton Oilers

Moncton won series 4 - 0

=== Southern Division ===
==== (1) Rochester Americans vs. (4) Hershey Bears ====
April 5	Rochester Americans	3 - 4	OT	Hershey Bears

April 7	Rochester Americans	4 - 1	Hershey Bears

April 9	Hershey Bears	4 - 7	Rochester Americans

April 11	Hershey Bears	2 - 5	Rochester Americans

April 13	Rochester Americans	4 - 1	Hershey Bears

Rochester won series 4 - 1

==== (2) Binghamton Rangers vs. (3) Baltimore Skipjacks ====
April 5	Binghamton Rangers	5 - 4	Baltimore Skipjacks

April 6	Binghamton Rangers	2 - 0	Baltimore Skipjacks

April 11	Baltimore Skipjacks	3 - 6	Binghamton Rangers

April 13	Baltimore Skipjacks	6 - 5	Binghamton Rangers

April 17	Binghamton Rangers	3 - 5	Baltimore Skipjacks

April 19	Baltimore Skipjacks	1 - 2	Binghamton Rangers

Binghamton won series 4 - 2

== Division Finals ==
=== Northern Division ===
==== (1) Springfield Indians vs. (3) Moncton Hawks ====
April 24	Springfield Indians	3 - 4	Moncton Hawks

April 26	Springfield Indians	3 - 2	Moncton Hawks

April 30	Moncton Hawks	2 - 9	Springfield Indians

May 2	Moncton Hawks	3 - 5	Springfield Indians

May 4	Springfield Indians	2 - 1	Moncton Hawks

Springfield won series 4 - 1

=== Southern Division ===
==== (1) Rochester Americans vs. (2) Binghamton Rangers ====
April 24	Rochester Americans	8 - 5	Binghamton Rangers

April 26	Binghamton Rangers	1 - 4	Rochester Americans

April 28	Rochester Americans	4 - 3	OT	Binghamton Rangers

April 29	Binghamton Rangers	4 - 6	Rochester Americans

Rochester won series 4 - 0

== Calder Cup Final ==
=== (S1) Rochester Americans vs. (N1) Springfield Indians ===
May 9	Rochester Americans	6 - 3	Springfield Indians

May 11	Rochester Americans	3 - 2	Springfield Indians

May 18	Springfield Indians	5 - 1	Rochester Americans

May 20	Springfield Indians	2 - 1	OT	Rochester Americans

May 22	Rochester Americans	3 - 6	Springfield Indians

May 24	Springfield Indians	5 - 3	Rochester Americans

Springfield won series 4 - 2

== See also ==
- 1990–91 AHL season
- List of AHL seasons

Preceded by 1990 Calder Cup playoffs	Calder Cup playoffs 1991	Succeeded by 1992 Calder Cup playoffs
