= 1994 Calder Cup playoffs =

North American ice hockey tournament

Tournament details
- Dates: April 13 – May 29, 1994
- Teams: 12

Final positions
- Champions: Portland Pirates
- Runners-up: Moncton Hawks

The 1994 Calder Cup playoffs of the American Hockey League began on April 13, 1994. The twelve teams that qualified, four from each division, played best-of-seven series for division semifinals and division finals. The highest remaining seed received a bye for the third round while the other two remaining teams played a best-of-3 series, with the winner advancing to play the bye-team in a best-of-seven series for the Calder Cup. The Calder Cup Final ended on May 29, 1994, with the Portland Pirates defeating the Moncton Hawks four games to two to win the first Calder Cup in team history. Portland's Olaf Kolzig won the Jack A. Butterfield Trophy as AHL playoff MVP.

Portland's Mike Boback tied an AHL playoff record for points in a single playoff game by scoring 7 points (3 goals, 4 assists) in game 5 of the Northern division semifinal against the Albany River Rats.

== Playoff seeds ==
After the 1993-94 AHL regular season, 12 teams qualified for the playoffs. The top four teams from each division qualified for the playoffs. The St. John's Maple Leafs finished the regular season with the best overall record.

=== Atlantic Division ===
1. St. John's Maple Leafs - 102 points
2. Saint John Flames - 84 points
3. Moncton Hawks - 81 points
4. Cape Breton Oilers - 77 points

=== Northern Division ===
1. Adirondack Red Wings - 98 points
2. Portland Pirates - 96 points
3. Albany River Rats - 84 points
4. Springfield Indians - 71 points

=== Southern Division ===
1. Hershey Bears - 87 points
2. Hamilton Canucks - 79 points
3. Cornwall Aces - 77 points
4. Rochester Americans - 77 points

== Bracket ==
Division semifinals
A1	St. John's	4
A4	Cape Breton	1
Atlantic Division
A2	Saint John	3
A3	Moncton	4
N1	Adirondack	4
N4	Springfield	2
Northern Division
N2	Portland	4
N3	Albany	1
S1	Hershey	4
S4	Rochester	0
Southern Division
S2	Hamilton	0
S3	Cornwall	4

Division finals
A1	St. John's	2
A3	Moncton	4
N1	Adirondack	2
N2	Portland	4
S1	Hershey	3
S3	Cornwall	4

Semifinals
A3	Moncton	2
S3	Cornwall	0

Final
N2	Portland	4
A3	Moncton	2

In each round the team that earned more points during the regular season receives home ice advantage, meaning they receive the "extra" game on home-ice if the series reaches the maximum number of games. For the Semifinal round, the team that earned the most points during the regular season out of the three remaining teams receives a bye directly to the Calder Cup Final. There is no set series format due to arena scheduling conflicts and travel considerations.

== Division Semifinals ==
Note 1: Home team is listed first.
Note 2: The number of overtime periods played (where applicable) is not specified

=== Atlantic Division ===
==== (A1) St. John's Maple Leafs vs. (A4) Cape Breton Oilers ====
April 13	St. John's Maple Leafs	4 - 2	Cape Breton Oilers

April 15	St. John's Maple Leafs	4 - 3	Cape Breton Oilers

April 18	Cape Breton Oilers	6 - 5	St. John's Maple Leafs

April 20	Cape Breton Oilers	2 - 8	St. John's Maple Leafs

April 22	Cape Breton Oilers	4 - 1	St. John's Maple Leafs

St. John's won series 4 – 1

==== (A2) Saint John Flames vs. (A3) Moncton Hawks ====
April 13	Saint John Flames	3 - 2	Moncton Hawks

April 15	Saint John Flames	5 - 4	Moncton Hawks

April 17	Moncton Hawks	3 - 2	Saint John Flames

April 19	Moncton Hawks	3 - 2	Saint John Flames

April 21	Saint John Flames	5 - 2	Moncton Hawks

April 25	Moncton Hawks	2 - 1	Saint John Flames

April 27	Saint John Flames	1 - 3	Moncton Hawks

Moncton won series 4 - 3

=== Northern Division ===
==== (N1) Adirondack Red Wings vs. (N4) Springfield Indians ====
April 15	Adirondack Red Wings	2 - 7	Springfield Indians

April 16	Adirondack Red Wings	3 - 5	Springfield Indians

April 20	Springfield Indians	6 - 9	Adirondack Red Wings

April 22	Springfield Indians	1 - 5	Adirondack Red Wings

April 24	Adirondack Red Wings	3 - 1	Springfield Indians

April 25	Springfield Indians	2 - 3	Adirondack Red Wings

Adirondack won series 4 – 2

The deciding game was the last for the sixty-year-old Springfield Indians franchise, which moved to Worcester, Massachusetts, in the offseason to become the Worcester IceCats.

==== (N2) Portland Pirates vs. (N3) Albany River Rats ====
April 15	Portland Pirates	1 - 3	Albany River Rats

April 16	Portland Pirates	5 - 3	Albany River Rats

April 20	Albany River Rats	1 - 2	Portland Pirates

April 22	Albany River Rats	2 - 5	Portland Pirates

April 23	Albany River Rats	2 - 9	Portland Pirates

Portland won series 4 - 1

=== Southern Division ===
==== (S1) Hershey Bears vs. (S4) Rochester Americans ====
April 13	Hershey Bears	5 - 3	Rochester Americans

April 15	Hershey Bears	5 - 4	OT	Rochester Americans

April 17	Rochester Americans	1 - 4	Hershey Bears

April 20	Rochester Americans	3 - 4	OT	Hershey Bears

Hershey won series 4 - 0

==== (S2) Hamilton Canucks vs. (S3) Cornwall Aces ====
April 13	Hamilton Canucks	5 - 8	Cornwall Aces

April 15	Hamilton Canucks	3 - 4	Cornwall Aces

April 18	Cornwall Aces	2 - 1	OT	Hamilton Canucks

April 20	Cornwall Aces	6 - 4	Hamilton Canucks

Cornwall won series 4 - 0

== Division Finals ==
=== Atlantic Division ===
==== (A1) St. John's Maple Leafs vs. (A3) Moncton Hawks ====
April 30	St. John's Maple Leafs	5 - 3	Moncton Hawks

May 2	St. John's Maple Leafs	1 - 2	OT	Moncton Hawks

May 4	Moncton Hawks	3 - 6	St. John's Maple Leafs

May 6	Moncton Hawks	4 - 3	OT	St. John's Maple Leafs

May 8	Moncton Hawks	5 - 0	St. John's Maple Leafs

May 10	St. John's Maple Leafs	4 - 5	Moncton Hawks

Moncton won series 4 - 2

=== Northern Division ===
==== (N1) Adirondack Red Wings vs. (N2) Portland Pirates ====
April 29	Adirondack Red Wings	4 - 2	Portland Pirates

April 30	Adirondack Red Wings	3 - 5	Portland Pirates

May 4	Portland Pirates	4 - 3	Adirondack Red Wings

May 6	Portland Pirates	1 - 5	Adirondack Red Wings

May 7	Portland Pirates	4 - 2	Adirondack Red Wings

May 10	Adirondack Red Wings	3 - 4	OT	Portland Pirates

Portland won series 4 - 2

=== Southern Division ===
==== (S1) Hershey Bears vs. (S3) Cornwall Aces ====
April 27	Hershey Bears	4 - 2	Cornwall Aces

April 29	Hershey Bears	1 - 5	Cornwall Aces

May 2	Cornwall Aces	1 - 3	Hershey Bears

May 4	Cornwall Aces	4 - 3	OT	Hershey Bears

May 6	Cornwall Aces	3 - 2	OT	Hershey Bears

May 8	Hershey Bears	4 - 3	Cornwall Aces

May 11	Hershey Bears	3 - 4	Cornwall Aces

Cornwall won series 4 - 3

== Semifinal ==
=== Bye ===
- (N2) Portland Pirates receive a bye to the Calder Cup Final by virtue of having earned the highest point total in the regular season out of the three remaining teams.

=== (A3) Moncton Hawks vs. (S3) Cornwall Aces ===
May 14	Cornwall Aces	1 - 4	Moncton Hawks

May 16	Moncton Hawks	5 - 2	Cornwall Aces

Moncton won series 2 - 0

== Calder Cup Final ==
=== (N2) Portland Pirates vs. (A3) Moncton Hawks ===
May 20	Portland Pirates	5 - 1	Moncton Hawks

May 21	Portland Pirates	2 - 6	Moncton Hawks

May 23	Moncton Hawks	3 - 4	Portland Pirates

May 25	Moncton Hawks	1 - 2	OT	Portland Pirates

May 27	Moncton Hawks	4 - 0	Portland Pirates

May 29	Portland Pirates	4 - 1	Moncton Hawks

Portland won series 4 - 2

== See also ==
- 1993–94 AHL season
- List of AHL seasons

Preceded by 1993 Calder Cup Playoffs	Calder Cup playoffs 1994	Succeeded by 1995 Calder Cup Playoffs
