= Shaun Van Allen =

Canadian ice hockey player

- Born: August 29, 1967 (age 58) Calgary, Alberta, Canada
- Height: 6 ft 1 in (185 cm)
- Weight: 210 lb (95 kg; 15 st 0 lb)
- Position: Centre
- Shot: Left
- Played for: Edmonton Oilers; Mighty Ducks of Anaheim; Ottawa Senators; Dallas Stars; Montreal Canadiens
- NHL draft: 105th overall, 1987; Edmonton Oilers
- Playing career: 1987–2004

Shaun Kelly Van Allen (born August 29, 1967) is a Canadian former professional ice hockey player who played in the National Hockey League (NHL) from 1991 to 2004. He played 794 games in the NHL and scored 269 points. He also served as the head coach of the Carleton University Ravens of the OUA.

== Professional career ==
Van Allen was drafted 105th overall in the 1987 NHL entry draft by the Edmonton Oilers after a standout junior hockey career with the Saskatoon Blades of the Western Hockey League. He spent five seasons in the Oilers system with the Milwaukee Admirals, Nova Scotia Oilers, and Cape Breton Oilers but failed to catch on with the big club in Edmonton. While in Cape Breton, Van Allen enjoyed much personal and team success. It was there that he met his wife, and in 1991-92 he won the John B. Sollenberger Trophy as the American Hockey League's leading scorer. In the 1992-93 season, Cape Breton, led by Van Allen, captured the Calder Cup title as American Hockey League Champions.

Once the 1992-93 season had concluded, the Oilers released him. In July 1993 Van Allen signed as a free agent with the expansion Mighty Ducks of Anaheim and became an NHL regular until his retirement in 2005. He spent three seasons in Anaheim and became a versatile forward, able to contribute on the score sheet as well as kill penalties.

On October 1, 1996, Van Allen was acquired by the Ottawa Senators with defenceman Jason York, and began perhaps his most successful period in the NHL. He spent four productive seasons in Ottawa before unrestricted free agency led him to the Dallas Stars, with whom he signed a two-year contract in July 2000. He spent parts of two seasons in Dallas before he was acquired by the Montreal Canadiens in the early 2001-02 season. After completing the 2001-02 season with Montreal, Van Allen returned to his former team, the Ottawa Senators, as a free agent. He was a regular in the Ottawa lineup in a defensive role until the beginning of the 2004-05 season, when the 2004–05 NHL lockout wiped the season out entirely. Van Allen announced his retirement as an NHL player in 2005.

== Career statistics ==
			Regular season					Playoffs
Season	Team	League	GP	G	A	Pts	PIM	GP	G	A	Pts	PIM
1984–85	Swift Current Indians	SJHL	61	12	20	32	136	—	—	—	—	—
1985–86	Saskatoon Blades	WHL	55	12	11	23	43	13	4	8	12	28
1986–87	Saskatoon Blades	WHL	72	38	59	97	116	11	4	6	10	24
1987–88	Nova Scotia Oilers	AHL	19	4	10	14	17	4	1	1	2	4
1987–88	Milwaukee Admirals	IHL	40	14	28	42	34	—	—	—	—	—
1988–89	Cape Breton Oilers	AHL	76	32	42	74	81	—	—	—	—	—
1989–90	Cape Breton Oilers	AHL	61	25	44	69	83	4	0	2	2	8
1990–91	Edmonton Oilers	NHL	2	0	0	0	0	—	—	—	—	—
1990–91	Cape Breton Oilers	AHL	76	25	75	100	182	4	0	1	1	8
1991–92	Cape Breton Oilers	AHL	77	29	84	113	80	5	3	7	10	14
1992–93	Edmonton Oilers	NHL	21	1	4	5	6	—	—	—	—	—
1992–93	Cape Breton Oilers	AHL	43	14	62	76	68	15	8	9	17	18
1993–94	Mighty Ducks of Anaheim	NHL	80	8	25	33	64	—	—	—	—	—
1994–95	Mighty Ducks of Anaheim	NHL	45	8	21	29	32	—	—	—	—	—
1995–96	Mighty Ducks of Anaheim	NHL	49	8	17	25	41	—	—	—	—	—
1996–97	Ottawa Senators	NHL	80	11	14	25	35	7	0	1	1	4
1997–98	Ottawa Senators	NHL	80	4	15	19	48	11	0	1	1	10
1998–99	Ottawa Senators	NHL	79	6	11	17	30	4	0	0	0	0
1999–2000	Ottawa Senators	NHL	75	9	19	28	37	6	0	1	1	9
2000–01	Dallas Stars	NHL	59	7	16	23	16	8	0	2	2	8
2001–02	Dallas Stars	NHL	19	2	4	6	6	—	—	—	—	—
2001–02	Montreal Canadiens	NHL	54	6	9	15	20	7	0	1	1	2
2002–03	Ottawa Senators	NHL	78	12	20	32	66	18	1	1	2	12
2003–04	Ottawa Senators	NHL	73	2	10	12	80	—	—	—	—	—
AHL totals			352	129	317	446	511	32	12	20	32	52
NHL totals			794	84	185	269	481	61	1	7	8	45

== Other ==
Van Allen was born in Calgary, Alberta and his family later relocated to Climax, Saskatchewan.

Van Allen served as the Director of Player Evaluation for the Ottawa Senators during the 2006-2007 season, with the responsibility of evaluating all players within the organization including professional players, minor league players, and prospects. He also served as first an assistant, then as head coach of Ottawa's Carleton University Ravens of the OUA.

He can be heard on TSN 1200 radio broadcasts of Ottawa Senators games, to which he contributes commentary during pre and post-game shows. As of September 2008, Van Allen has appeared on Rogers TV broadcasts of Senators' games in Ottawa.
