= Utica Devils =

- City: Utica, New York
- League: American Hockey League
- Founded: 1977
- Operated: 1987–1993
- Home arena: Utica Memorial Auditorium
- Colors: Green, red, white (original) Red, black, white (later)
- Affiliates: New Jersey Devils (NHL) (1987–1993)

Franchise history
- 1977–1987: Maine Mariners
- 1987–1993: Utica Devils
- 1993–2003: Saint John Flames
- 2005–2007: Omaha Ak-Sar-Ben Knights
- 2007–2009: Quad City Flames
- 2009–2014: Abbotsford Heat
- 2014–2015: Adirondack Flames
- 2015–2022: Stockton Heat
- 2022–Present: Calgary Wranglers

The Utica Devils were a professional ice hockey team of the American Hockey League (AHL). The team was based in Utica, New York, and played its home games at the Utica Memorial Auditorium.

== History ==
The Utica Devils were AHL affiliate of the National Hockey League's New Jersey Devils from 1987 to 1993. The franchise was moved from Portland, Maine, at the end of the 1986–87 season, where it played as the Maine Mariners. The Utica Devils displaced the Mohawk Valley Comets of the Atlantic Coast Hockey League that had played there since 1985. Utica was coached by Tom McVie for four seasons from 1987 to 1991, followed by Herb Brooks in 1991–92 and Robbie Ftorek in 1992–93.

Martin Brodeur during his tenure with Utica

Notable players who at one time were Utica Devils include Martin Brodeur, Bill Guerin, Kevin Todd, Corey Schwab, Bobby Holik, Claude Vilgrain, Valeri Zelepukin, Jason Smith, and Jim Dowd.

In 1993, the NHL's Calgary Flames purchased the Utica Devils franchise from the New Jersey Devils and subsequently relocated the team to Saint John, New Brunswick, to become the Saint John Flames. The Devils moved their AHL affiliation to the Albany River Rats the same year. Utica gained the Bulldogs of the Colonial Hockey League in 1993, which only lasted one season before folding and being replaced by the Utica Blizzard in 1994. The AHL eventually returned to Utica in 2013 with the Utica Comets using the Vancouver Canucks' franchise. In April 2021, a new trademark was filed for the brand "Utica Devils" by Robert Esche, the operator of the Utica Comets, for a potential relocation of the Binghamton Devils. On May 6, it was announced that the Devils would affiliate with Utica, but the Comets name would remain.

== Season-by-season results ==
Regular season										Playoffs				
Season	Games	Won	Lost	Tied	OTL	Points	Goals for	Goals against	Standing	Year	1st round	2nd round	3rd round	Finals
1987–88	80	34	33	11	2	81	318	307	5th, South	1988	Did not qualify			
1988–89	80	37	34	9	—	83	309	295	3rd, South	1989	L, 1–4, HER	—	—	—
1989–90	80	44	32	4	—	92	354	315	4th, South	1990	L, 1–4, RCH	—	—	—
1990–91	80	36	42	2	—	74	325	346	6th, South	1991	Did not qualify			
1991–92	80	34	40	6	—	74	268	313	4th, South	1992	L, 0–4, BNG	—	—	—
1992–93	80	33	36	11	—	77	325	354	3rd, South	1993	L, 1–4, RCH	—	—	—

== Team records ==
Goals: 53, Paul Ysebaert, 1989–90
Assists: 81, Kevin Todd, 1990–91
Points: 118, Kevin Todd, 1990–91
Penalty Minutes: 359, Bill Huard, 1990–91
GAA: 2.71, Chris Terreri, 1987–88
SV%: .910, Chris Terreri, 1987–88
Career goals: 126, Jeff Madill, 1987–91
Career assists: 163, Kevin Todd, 1988–93
Career points: 264, Paul Ysebaert, 1987–90
Career penalty minutes: 1216, Jamie Huscroft, 1987–92
Career goaltending wins: Craig Billington, 59
Career shutouts: 3, Craig Billington
Career games: 273, Dave Marcinyshyn, 1987–91
