= Dennis Bonvie =

Canadian ice hockey player (born 1973)

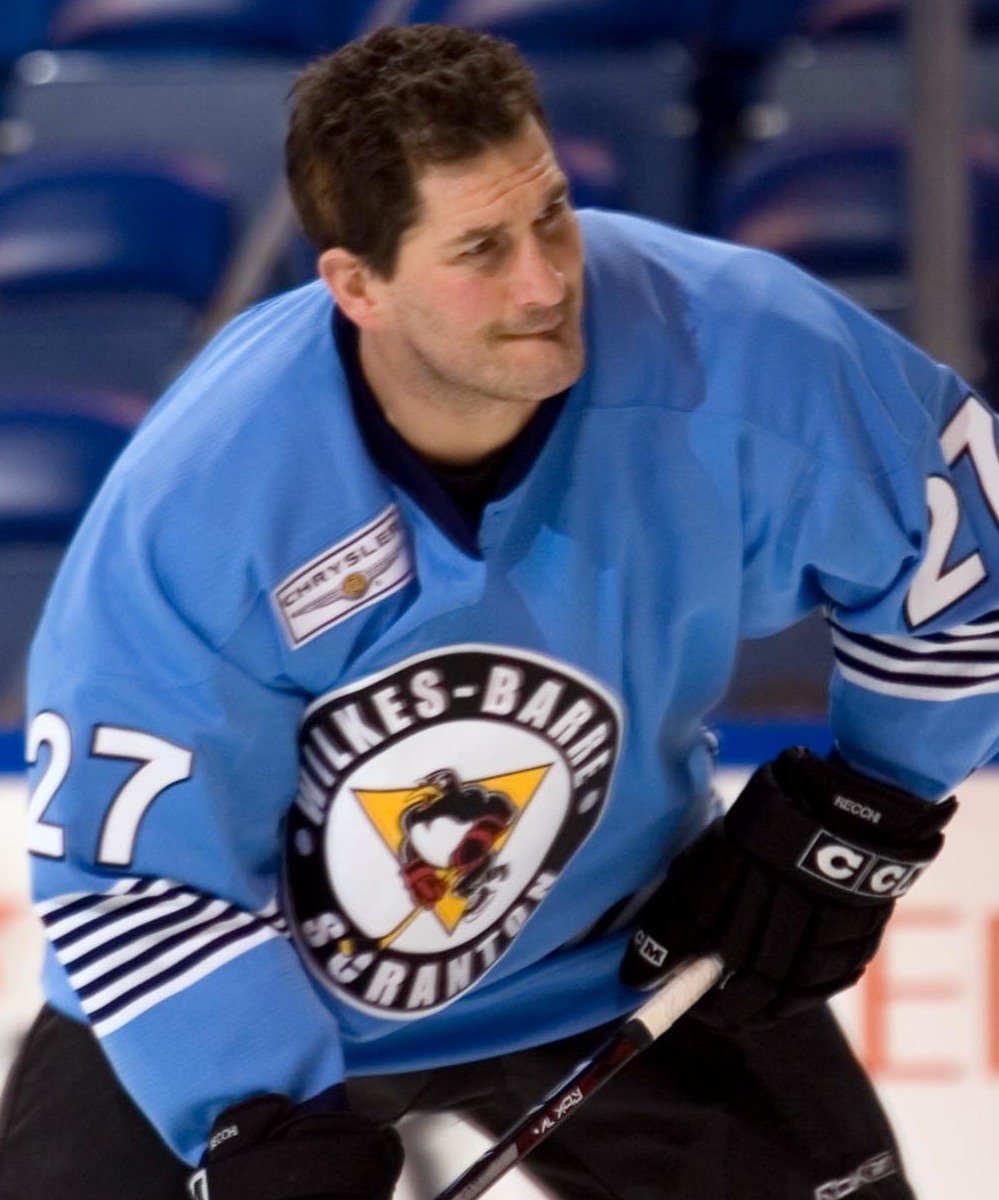
- Bonvie with the Wilkes-Barre/Scranton Penguins in 2007
- Born: July 23, 1973 (age 53) Antigonish, Nova Scotia, Canada
- Height: 5 ft 11 in (180 cm)
- Weight: 205 lb (93 kg; 14 st 9 lb)
- Position: Right wing
- Shot: Right
- Played for: Edmonton Oilers; Chicago Blackhawks; Pittsburgh Penguins; Boston Bruins; Ottawa Senators; Colorado Avalanche
- NHL draft: Undrafted
- Playing career: 1993–2008

Dennis Kevin Bonvie (born July 23, 1973) is a Canadian former professional ice hockey player, most notable for being the most penalized player in professional hockey history with 4,804 career professional career penalty minutes (most of it being in the American Hockey League). He is currently an assistant general manager for the NHL’s Boston Bruins.

== Playing career ==
While Bonvie, a 5'11", 205-pound right winger, had appeared in 92 National Hockey League games with six different NHL teams since he turned pro in 1993 with the Edmonton Oilers, he spent the vast majority of his career in the American Hockey League in which he played with eight different clubs. Bonvie was known for a physical style of play and his primary role as the enforcer for his various teams. In his 92 NHL games, he recorded 311 PIMs.

On October 12, 1993, as a rookie with the Cape Breton Oilers Bonvie was involved in his first professional fight in the AHL against Jamie Huscroft of the Providence Bruins. On September 17, 1995 during his first pre-season game with the Edmonton Oilers Bonvie dropped the gloves with Bob Probert of the Chicago Blackhawks. On October 8, 1995, Bonvie was credited with his first NHL fight taking on Stu Grimson of the Detroit Red Wings. As a member of the Hamilton Bulldogs in 1997, Bonvie established a then-single season AHL record for penalty minutes (PIM) with 522, a mark which stood for eight seasons before being eclipsed in 2004–05 by Brian McGrattan of the Binghamton Senators with 551. Bonvie's eventual career AHL penalty minute total, 4,493 minutes (in just 871 regular season games) was a remarkable 1,553 more than Rob Murray's second overall career AHL record high total 2,940 PIM in 1,018 games over fifteen seasons. During the 2008 season, Bonvie surpassed Kevin Evans for the most career penalty minutes in professional hockey history.

Bonvie's first and only NHL goal was scored when he was a member of the Boston Bruins. Bonvie had captured the puck at the blue line and let a hard slapshot go right at the top of the faceoff circle. He beat Chris "Ozzy" Osgood, who was playing for the New York Islanders at the time, fivehole. After Dennis had scored, he went by Osgood and said jokingly, "I think it's time you better retire."

The Mohegan Sun Arena at Casey Plaza, home of the Wilkes-Barre/Scranton Penguins, is often called the "house that Bonvie built."

On December 26, 2007 in front of a sold out home crowd, Bonvie was involved in a toe-to-toe style fight with Jon Mirasty of the Syracuse Crunch. The fight lasted 1 minute and 30 seconds with both players trading multiple punches.

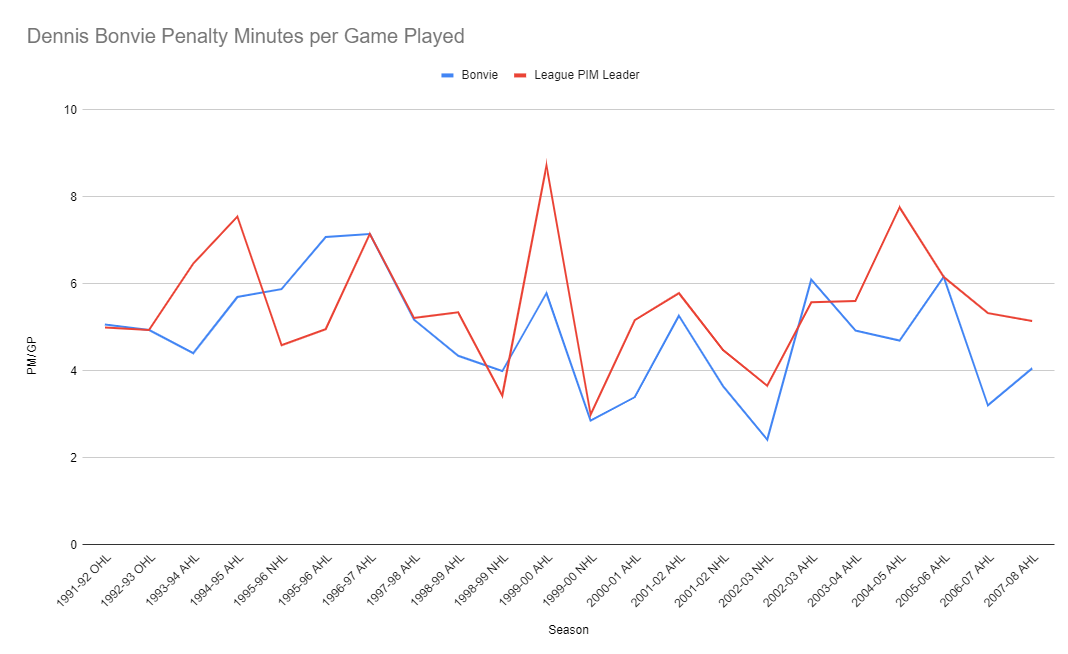
Chart displaying Dennis Bonvie Penalty Minutes Per Game Played

On April 12, 2008, Bonvie would dress in his last regular season game. Wilkes-Barre/Scranton captain Nathan Smith honored Bonvie by giving him the captain's "C" for his final game. Bonvie was involved in a fight that night taking on Jay Rosehill of the Norfolk Admirals. After the fight was over, Rosehill rose Bonvie's hand as a sign of respect and told him "it was an honor to fight him".

On April 20, 2008, in an AHL playoff game against the Hershey Bears, Bonvie was involved in his final career scrap against agitator Louis Robitaille. This specific fight had been much anticipated as Bonvie had asked Robitaille to fight multiple times throughout the season.

In the 2007–08 season, he played as a member of the Eastern Conference champion Wilkes-Barre/Scranton Penguins before eventually losing the 2008 Calder Cup in six games to the Chicago Wolves. Bonvie retired after the season. Bonvie currently operates the Dennis Bonvie Hockey Camp in Wilkes-Barre, PA.

== Restaurateur ==
Bonvie recently opened three restaurants in Northeastern Pennsylvania including Bonvie's Old Forge Pizza Express, Bonvie's Beefy King, and Bonvie's Blue Chip Gourmet.

== Career statistics ==
			Regular season					Playoffs
Season	Team	League	GP	G	A	Pts	PIM	GP	G	A	Pts	PIM
1991–92	Kitchener Rangers	OHL	7	1	1	2	23	—	—	—	—	—
1991–92	North Bay Centennials	OHL	49	0	12	12	261	21	0	1	1	91
1992–93	North Bay Centennials	OHL	64	3	21	24	316	5	0	0	0	34
1993–94	Cape Breton Oilers	AHL	63	1	10	11	278	4	0	0	0	11
1994–95	Cape Breton Oilers	AHL	74	5	15	20	422	—	—	—	—	—
1994–95	Edmonton Oilers	NHL	2	0	0	0	0	—	—	—	—	—
1995–96	Cape Breton Oilers	AHL	38	13	14	27	269	—	—	—	—	—
1995–96	Edmonton Oilers	NHL	8	0	0	0	47	—	—	—	—	—
1996–97	Hamilton Bulldogs	AHL	73	9	20	29	522	22	3	11	14	91
1997–98	Hamilton Bulldogs	AHL	57	11	19	30	295	9	0	5	5	18
1997–98	Edmonton Oilers	NHL	4	0	0	0	27	—	—	—	—	—
1998–99	Portland Pirates	AHL	3	1	0	1	16	—	—	—	—	—
1998–99	Philadelphia Phantoms	AHL	37	4	10	14	158	14	3	3	6	26
1998–99	Chicago Blackhawks	NHL	11	0	0	0	44	—	—	—	—	—
1999–00	Wilkes–Barre/Scranton Penguins	AHL	42	5	26	31	243	—	—	—	—	—
1999–00	Pittsburgh Penguins	NHL	28	0	0	0	80	—	—	—	—	—
2000–01	Wilkes–Barre/Scranton Penguins	AHL	65	5	18	23	221	21	0	4	4	35
2000–01	Pittsburgh Penguins	NHL	3	0	0	0	0	—	—	—	—	—
2001–02	Providence Bruins	AHL	55	8	8	16	290	—	—	—	—	—
2001–02	Boston Bruins	NHL	23	1	2	3	84	1	0	0	0	0
2002–03	Binghamton Senators	AHL	51	7	3	10	311	14	2	4	6	85
2002–03	Ottawa Senators	NHL	12	0	0	0	29	—	—	—	—	—
2003–04	Binghamton Senators	AHL	29	2	4	6	137	—	—	—	—	—
2003–04	Hershey Bears	AHL	30	3	6	9	154	—	—	—	—	—
2003–04	Colorado Avalanche	NHL	1	0	0	0	0	—	—	—	—	—
2004–05	Hershey Bears	AHL	76	4	14	18	357	—	—	—	—	—
2005–06	Wilkes–Barre/Scranton Penguins	AHL	70	2	13	15	431	9	0	0	0	29
2006–07	Wilkes–Barre/Scranton Penguins	AHL	58	2	7	9	186	4	0	1	1	7
2007–08	Wilkes–Barre/Scranton Penguins	AHL	50	2	4	6	203	9	1	0	1	17
NHL totals			92	1	2	3	311	1	0	0	0	0
AHL totals			871	84	191	275	4493	98	9	27	36	353
