= Dan Currie (ice hockey) =

Canadian ice hockey player (born 1968)

- Born: March 15, 1968 (age 58) Burlington, Ontario, Canada
- Height: 6 ft 2 in (188 cm)
- Weight: 195 lb (88 kg; 13 st 13 lb)
- Position: Left wing
- Shot: Left
- Played for: Edmonton Oilers; Los Angeles Kings
- NHL draft: 84th overall, 1986; Edmonton Oilers
- Playing career: 1987–2003

Dan Currie (born March 15, 1968) is a Canadian retired professional ice hockey left winger.

== Biography ==
Currie was born in Burlington, Ontario. As a youth, Currie played in the 1981 Quebec International Pee-Wee Hockey Tournament with a minor ice hockey team from Burlington. He played junior hockey for the Sault Ste. Marie Greyhounds of the Ontario Hockey League. He played for the Canada national junior hockey team that won the gold medal at the 1988 World Junior Ice Hockey Championships.

He was drafted by the Edmonton Oilers in the fourth round of the 1986 NHL entry draft and joined their American Hockey League minor league affiliate Cape Breton Oilers at the end of the 1987–88 season. He spent the next five seasons in the Oilers' organization, but only played in 17 games for the NHL team. Currie signed with the Los Angeles Kings for the 1993–94 season, but only played in five games for the Kings that season. He spent most of that year and the next four seasons in the International Hockey League.

Currie played in the German Deutsche Eishockey Liga for the 1998–99 season, followed by two seasons playing for Bakersfield in the West Coast Hockey League. He returned to Europe for one season in the Italian Serie A and one season in the British National League.

== Career statistics ==
			Regular season					Playoffs
Season	Team	League	GP	G	A	Pts	PIM	GP	G	A	Pts	PIM
1984–85	Burlington Cougars	CJHL	2	0	0	0	0	—	—	—	—	—
1985–86	Sault Ste. Marie Greyhounds	OHL	66	21	22	43	37	—	—	—	—	—
1986–87	Sault Ste. Marie Greyhounds	OHL	66	31	52	83	53	4	2	1	3	2
1987–88	Sault Ste. Marie Greyhounds	OHL	57	50	59	109	53	6	3	9	12	4
1987–88	Nova Scotia Oilers	AHL	3	4	2	6	0	5	4	3	7	0
1988–89	Cape Breton Oilers	AHL	77	29	36	65	29	—	—	—	—	—
1989–90	Cape Breton Oilers	AHL	77	36	40	76	28	6	4	4	8	0
1990–91	Edmonton Oilers	NHL	5	0	0	0	4	—	—	—	—	—
1990–91	Cape Breton Oilers	AHL	71	47	45	92	51	4	3	1	4	8
1991–92	Edmonton Oilers	NHL	7	1	0	1	0	—	—	—	—	—
1991–92	Cape Breton Oilers	AHL	66	50	42	92	39	5	4	5	9	4
1992–93	Edmonton Oilers	NHL	5	0	0	0	4	—	—	—	—	—
1992–93	Cape Breton Oilers	AHL	75	57	41	98	73	16	7	4	11	29
1993–94	Los Angeles Kings	NHL	5	1	1	2	0	—	—	—	—	—
1993–94	Phoenix Roadrunners	IHL	74	37	49	86	96	—	—	—	—	—
1994–95	Phoenix Roadrunners	IHL	16	2	6	8	8	—	—	—	—	—
1994–95	Minnesota Moose	IHL	54	18	35	53	34	3	0	0	0	2
1995–96	Chicago Wolves	IHL	79	39	34	73	53	9	5	4	9	12
1996–97	Chicago Wolves	IHL	55	18	10	28	18	—	—	—	—	—
1996–97	Fort Wayne Komets	IHL	24	10	12	22	6	—	—	—	—	—
1997–98	Fort Wayne Komets	IHL	77	29	22	51	17	4	0	2	2	2
1998–99	Hannover Scorpions	DEL	44	6	12	18	50	—	—	—	—	—
1999–00	Bakersfield Condors	WCHL	70	42	41	83	34	4	2	1	3	2
2000–01	Bakersfield Condors	WCHL	53	20	27	47	34	3	0	0	0	2
2001–02	HC Bolzano	Italy	27	10	16	26	26	—	—	—	—	—
2001–02	HC Merano	Italy	14	9	6	15	6	—	—	—	—	—
2002–03	Hull Thunder	BNL	5	1	4	5	2	—	—	—	—	—
2004–05	Dundas Real McCoys	MLH	28	20	25	45	4	—	—	—	—	—
2005–06	Dundas Real McCoys	MLH	1	0	0	0	0	—	—	—	—	—
NHL totals			22	2	1	3	4	—	—	—	—	—
AHL totals			369	223	206	429	220	36	22	17	39	41
IHL totals			379	153	168	321	232	16	5	6	11	16
