= Bill McDougall =

Canadian ice hockey player

- Born: August 10, 1966 (age 60) New Waterford, Nova Scotia, Canada
- Height: 6 ft 0 in (183 cm)
- Weight: 185 lb (84 kg; 13 st 3 lb)
- Position: Centre
- Shot: Right
- Played for: Detroit Red Wings; Edmonton Oilers; Tampa Bay Lightning
- NHL draft: Undrafted
- Playing career: 1990–2008

William Henry McDougall (born August 10, 1966) is a Canadian former professional ice hockey player. He is best known for his record-setting scoring performance during the 1992–1993 AHL playoffs, in which he set the AHL records for goals, assists, and points in a single playoff season.

== Career ==
=== Amateur ===
As a youth, McDougall played in the 1979 Quebec International Pee-Wee Hockey Tournament with a minor ice hockey team from Toronto.

McDougall signed with the Erie Panthers following a successful season of senior hockey with the senior Port-aux-Basque Mariners. After scoring 80 goals and 148 points in just 57 games, he was signed by the NHL's Detroit Red Wings and finished the end of the 1989–90 season with their farm club, the Adirondack Red Wings. McDougall was named to the ECHL All-Star First Team in 1990. He appeared in 2 games for the parent club the following season after posting a 99-point season with the Adirondack Red Wings.

Prior to his season of senior hockey, McDougall spent one season in the Saskatchewan Junior Hockey League. McDougall had one of the best seasons ever in the 1986–87 season with the Humboldt Broncos, leading the league with 83 goals, 104 assists, and 187 points in only 61 games. He also led the league with 27 power play goals and 9 short handed goals. After a season of Junior "B" hockey in which he scored 45 goals and 132 points in 42 games for the Streetsville Derbys, the 20-year-old decided to continue his hockey career out west with the Broncos.

The Broncos hosted the Centennial Cup that year and thanks to McDougall they got to the finals before being beaten by the Richmond Sockeyes of the BCJHL. He showed everyone at that tournament though that his regular season performance was no fluke as he had 11 points in four games and was named the tournament's all-star center.

=== Professional ===
Undrafted, MacDougall signed his first professional contract as a free agent with the Detroit Red Wings organization in 1989. While playing for the Adirondack Red Wings early in the 1991–92 season, MacDougall was attacked in the dressing room by head coach Barry Melrose after the coach became incensed over the player's refusal to listen to him. Melrose had to be pulled off MacDougall by several other players, and MacDougall's days in the Red Wings organization soon came to an end. The following season, Melrose coached Wayne Gretzky and the Los Angeles Kings to the Stanley Cup Final.

McDougall was traded from Detroit to the Edmonton Oilers for Max Middendorf in February 1992, and ultimately made his mark on the hockey world with their AHL farm team, his hometown Cape Breton Oilers. The Cape Breton Oilers' 1992–1993 playoff run was one of the most dominant in AHL history, with McDougall emerging as the team's offensive star, scoring 52 points (26 goals and 26 assists) in 16 games en route to the Calder Cup championship. McDougall was awarded the Jack A. Butterfield Trophy as playoff MVP. To this day, his AHL records for goals, assists, and points in a single playoff season still stand.

Hoping to recreate his AHL success in the NHL, McDougall signed with the Tampa Bay Lightning organization prior to the 1993-94 season, but he only managed 3 goals and 3 assists in 22 games with the parent club in Tampa. This was ultimately MacDougall's last chance at an NHL career, and he moved to Europe to resume playing professional hockey. He spent the next 8 seasons playing with various pro teams in Italy, Switzerland, and Germany.

McDougall returned to Canada in 2002 and spend six seasons with the Dundas Real McCoys of the MLH in Ontario. McDougall retired from hockey following the 2007-08 MLH season.

== Retirement ==
Since his retirement and a 2010 divorce, McDougall has returned to Cape Breton and operates a hockey camp (Advance Hockey Development) in Toronto to help kids with off-ice training.

== Career statistics ==
			Regular season					Playoffs
Season	Team	League	GP	G	A	Pts	PIM	GP	G	A	Pts	PIM
1984–85	Streetsville Derbys	CJHL	9	4	7	11	32	—	—	—	—	—
1984–85	Dixie Beehives	OJHL	27	16	32	48	104	—	—	—	—	—
1985–86	Streetsville Derbys	CJHL	42	45	87	132	262	11	6	18	24	70
1986–87	Humboldt Broncos	SJHL	61	83	104	187	300	—	—	—	—	—
1986–87	Humboldt Broncos	CC	—	—	—	—	—	4	4	3	7	6
1987–88	St. John's Capitals	NFLD-Sr.	42	66	71	137	47	—	—	—	—	—
1988–89	Port-aux-Basques Mariners	NFLD-Sr.	26	20	41	61	129	—	—	—	—	—
1989–90	Erie Panthers	ECHL	57	80	68	148	226	7	5	5	10	20
1989–90	Adirondack Red Wings	AHL	11	10	7	17	4	2	1	1	2	2
1990–91	Adirondack Red Wings	AHL	71	47	52	99	192	2	1	2	3	2
1990–91	Detroit Red Wings	NHL	2	0	1	1	0	1	0	0	0	0
1991–92	Adirondack Red Wings	AHL	45	28	24	52	112	—	—	—	—	—
1991–92	Cape Breton Oilers	AHL	22	8	18	26	36	4	0	1	1	8
1992–93	Cape Breton Oilers	AHL	71	42	46	88	161	16	26	26	52	30
1992–93	Edmonton Oilers	NHL	4	2	1	3	4	—	—	—	—	—
1993–94	Atlanta Knights	IHL	48	17	30	47	141	14	12	7	19	30
1993–94	Tampa Bay Lightning	NHL	22	3	3	6	8	—	—	—	—	—
1994–95	Courmaosta HC	ITA	30	30	34	64	107	—	—	—	—	—
1995–96	HK Olimpija Ljubljana	SVN	15	14	13	27		—	—	—	—	—
1995–96	EV Zug	NDA	15	15	14	29	69	8	7	4	11	35
1996–97	EV Zug	NDA	45	41	30	71	110	6	1	2	3	6
1997–98	EV Zug	NDA	40	25	25	50	50	19	16	11	27	51
1998–99	Kloten Flyers	NDA	22	13	10	23	101	—	—	—	—	—
1998–99	HC Lugano	NDA	10	6	2	8	10	6	0	5	5	10
1999–2000	München Barons	DEL	39	16	22	38	64	—	—	—	—	—
2000–01	EHC Chur	CHE.2	18	6	12	18	28	—	—	—	—	—
2001–02	ERC Ingolstadt	DEU.2	15	4	7	11	53	—	—	—	—	—
2002–03	Dundas Real McCoys	MLH	5	6	8	14	4	—	—	—	—	—
2003–04	Dundas Real McCoys	MLH	13	3	5	8	4	—	—	—	—	—
2004–05	Dundas Real McCoys	MLH	6	3	1	4	4	—	—	—	—	—
2005–06	Dundas Real McCoys	MLH	8	4	1	5	4	9	2	2	4	24
2007–08	Dundas Real McCoys	MLH	3	0	0	0	6	—	—	—	—	—
AHL totals			220	135	147	282	505	24	28	30	58	42
NHL totals			28	5	5	10	12	1	0	0	0	0
NDA totals			150	106	93	199	368	47	28	26	54	110
