= 1991–92 AHL season =

- League: American Hockey League
- Sport: Ice hockey

Regular season
- F. G. "Teddy" Oke Trophy: Springfield Indians
- Season MVP: John Anderson
- Top scorer: Shaun Van Allen

Playoffs
- Playoffs MVP: Allan Bester

Calder Cup
- Champions: Adirondack Red Wings
- Runners-up: St. John's Maple Leafs

AHL seasons
- 1990–91 1992–93

The 1991–92 AHL season was the 56th season of the American Hockey League. The league realigned from two divisions into three divisions, creating the new Atlantic division. Fifteen teams played 80 games each in the schedule. The Fredericton Canadiens finished first overall in the regular season. The Adirondack Red Wings won their fourth Calder Cup championship.

== Team changes ==
- The Newmarket Saints move to St. John's, Newfoundland, becoming the St. John's Maple Leafs, playing in the Atlantic Division.
- The Fredericton Canadiens, Cape Breton Oilers, Moncton Hawks and Halifax Citadels all shift from the North Division to the Atlantic Division.
- The Adirondack Red Wings and Capital District Islanders shift from the South Division to the North.

== Final standings ==
- y– indicates team clinched division and a playoff spot
- x– indicates team clinched a playoff spot
- e– indicates team was eliminated from playoff contention

Atlantic Division	GP	W	L	T	Pts	GF	GA
y–Fredericton Canadiens (MTL)	80	43	27	10	96	314	254
x–St. John's Maple Leafs (TOR)	80	39	29	12	90	325	285
x–Cape Breton Oilers (EDM)	80	36	34	10	82	336	330
x–Moncton Hawks (WIN)	80	32	38	10	74	285	299
e–Halifax Citadels (QUE)	80	25	38	17	67	280	324

North Division	GP	W	L	T	Pts	GF	GA
y–Springfield Indians (HFD)	80	43	29	8	94	308	277
x–Adirondack Red Wings (DET)	80	40	36	4	84	335	309
x–New Haven Nighthawks (LAK)	80	39	37	4	82	305	309
x–Capital District Islanders (NYI)	80	32	37	11	75	261	289
e–Maine Mariners (BOS)	80	23	47	10	56	296	352

South Division	GP	W	L	T	Pts	GF	GA
y–Binghamton Rangers (NYR)	80	41	30	9	91	318	277
x–Rochester Americans (BUF)	80	37	31	12	86	292	248
x–Hershey Bears (PHI)	80	36	33	11	83	313	337
x–Utica Devils (NJD)	80	34	40	6	74	268	313
e–Baltimore Skipjacks (WSH)	80	28	42	10	66	287	320

== Scoring leaders ==
Note: GP = Games played; G = Goals; A = Assists; Pts = Points; PIM = Penalty minutes

Player	Team	GP	G	A	Pts	PIM
Shaun Van Allen	Cape Breton Oilers	77	29	84	113	80
Tim Tookey	Hershey Bears	80	36	69	105	63
Stan Drulia	New Haven Nighthawks	77	49	53	102	46
Peter Ciavaglia	Rochester Americans	77	37	61	98	16
John Anderson	New Haven Nighthawks	68	41	54	95	24
Andrew McKim	St. John's Maple Leafs	79	43	50	93	79
Greg Parks	Capital District Islanders	70	36	57	93	84
Dan Currie	Cape Breton Oilers	66	50	42	92	39
Simon Wheeldon	Baltimore Skipjacks	78	38	53	91	62

- complete list

== Calder Cup playoffs ==
Division semifinals
A1	Fredericton	3
A4	Moncton	4
Atlantic Division
A2	St. John's	4
A3	Cape Breton	1
N1	Springfield	4
N4	Capital District	3
North Division
N2	Adirondack	4
N3	New Haven	1
S1	Binghamton	4
S4	Utica	0
South Division
S2	Rochester	4
S3	Hershey	2

Division finals
A4	Moncton	0
A2	St. John's	4
N1	Springfield	0
N2	Adirondack	4
S1	Binghamton	3
S2	Rochester	4

Semifinals
N2	Adirondack	2
S2	Rochester	1

Final
A2	St. John's	3
N2	Adirondack	4

For the Semifinal round, the team (St. John's Maple Leafs) that earned the most points (90) during the regular season out of the three remaining teams receives a bye directly to the Calder Cup Final.

== Trophy and award winners ==
=== Team awards ===
Calder Cup; Playoff champions:	Adirondack Red Wings
Richard F. Canning Trophy; North division playoff champions:	Adirondack Red Wings
Robert W. Clarke Trophy; South division playoff champions:	Rochester Americans
F. G. "Teddy" Oke Trophy; Regular Season champions, North Division:	Springfield Indians
John D. Chick Trophy; Regular Season champions, South Division:	Binghamton Rangers

=== Individual awards ===
Les Cunningham Award; Most valuable player:	John Anderson - New Haven Nighthawks
John B. Sollenberger Trophy; Top point scorer:	Shaun Van Allen - Cape Breton Oilers
Dudley "Red" Garrett Memorial Award; Rookie of the year:	Felix Potvin - St. John's Maple Leafs
Eddie Shore Award; Defenceman of the year:	Greg Hawgood - Cape Breton Oilers
Aldege "Baz" Bastien Memorial Award; Best Goaltender:	Felix Potvin - St. John's Maple Leafs
Harry "Hap" Holmes Memorial Award; Lowest goals against average:	David Littman - Rochester Americans
Louis A. R. Pieri Memorial Award; Coach of the year:	Doug Carpenter - New Haven Nighthawks
Fred T. Hunt Memorial Award; Sportsmanship / Persevarence:	John Anderson - New Haven Nighthawks
Jack A. Butterfield Trophy; MVP of the playoffs:	Allan Bester - Adirondack Red Wings

=== Other awards ===
James C. Hendy Memorial Award; Most outstanding executive:	Gordon Anziano & Pat Hickey
James H. Ellery Memorial Awards; Outstanding media coverage:	Jim Hackson, Baltimore, (newspaper); Dave LeBlanc, Cape Breton, (radio); Ken Harris, Binghamton, (television)
Ken McKenzie Award; Outstanding marketing executive:	Russ Newton, Fredericton Canadiens

== See also ==
- List of AHL seasons

Preceded by 1990–91 AHL season	AHL seasons	Succeeded by 1992–93 AHL season
