= Cornwall Aces =

- City: Cornwall, Ontario
- League: American Hockey League
- Operated: 1993–1996
- Home arena: Ed Lumley Arena
- Colors: Red, white, blue
- Affiliates: Quebec Nordiques; Colorado Avalanche

Franchise history
- 1981–1988: Fredericton Express
- 1988–1993: Halifax Citadels
- 1993–1996: Cornwall Aces
- 1999–present: Wilkes-Barre/Scranton Penguins

The Cornwall Aces were the American Hockey League (AHL) affiliate of the National Hockey League's Quebec Nordiques from 1993 to 1995 and the relocated Colorado Avalanche in 1995–96. They were based in the eastern Ontario city of Cornwall and played at the Ed Lumley Arena inside the Cornwall Civic Complex. After one season being affiliated with Colorado, the franchise went dormant for three seasons, while the Avalanche transferred players to their other affiliate, the Hershey Bears. The franchise was resurrected in 1999 as the Wilkes-Barre/Scranton Penguins.

The Cornwall Aces won two division titles during their three-year stay in Cornwall. Coaches were Bob Hartley, who would coach the Colorado Avalanche, the Atlanta Thrashers and the Calgary Flames of the National Hockey League, and Jacques Martin, former head coach of the NHL's Ottawa Senators and Montreal Canadiens.

== Players ==
=== American Hockey League Hall of Famers ===
AHL Hall of Fame Honored Members
Name	Seasons	Induction Year
Jean-Francois Labbe	1995-96 (player)	2016
John Slaney	1995-96 (player)	2014

== Season-by-season results ==
=== Regular season ===
Season	Games	Won	Lost	Tied	OTL	Points	Goals for	Goals against	Standing
1993–94	80	33	36	11	—	77	294	295	3rd, South
1994–95	80	38	33	9	—	85	236	248	2nd, South
1995–96	80	34	34	7	5	80	249	251	4th, Central

=== Playoffs ===
Season	1st round	2nd round	3rd round	Finals
1993–94	W, 4-0, Hamilton	W, 4-3, Hershey	L, 0-2, Moncton	—
1994–95	W, 4-2, Hershey	W, 4-2, Binghamton	L, 0-2, Fredericton	—
1995–96	W, 3-1, Albany	L, 0-4, Rochester	—	—
