= 1998–99 Nationalliga A season =

Swiss professional ice hockey season

The 1998–99 NLA season was the 61st regular season of the Nationalliga A.

== Regular season ==
=== Final standings ===
	Team	GP	W	L	T	GF	GA	Pts
1.	HC Ambri-Piotta	45	33	7	5	188	104	71
2.	ZSC Lions	45	27	11	7	170	115	61
3.	HC Lugano	45	27	13	5	155	114	59
4.	SC Bern	45	22	18	5	162	157	49
5.	EV Zug	45	20	19	6	157	130	46
6.	HC Davos	45	19	19	7	166	156	45
7.	Kloten Flyers	45	12	20	13	134	145	37
8.	SC Rapperswil-Jona	45	15	25	5	128	177	35
9.	HC Fribourg-Gottéron	45	13	29	3	112	165	29
10.	SCL Tigers	45	7	34	4	112	221	18

== Playoffs ==
=== Quarterfinals ===
HC Ambri-Piotta (1) vs. SC Rapperswil-Jona (8)
Away	Home
SC Rapperswil-Jona 2	5 HC Ambri-Piotta
HC Ambri-Piotta 4	1 SC Rapperswil-Jona
SC Rapperswil-Jona 0	7 HC Ambri-Piotta
HC Ambri-Piotta 2	4 SC Rapperswil-Jona
SC Rapperswil-Jona 2	6 HC Ambri-Piotta
HC Ambri-Piotta wins series 4–1

HC Lugano vs. HC Davos
Date	Away	Home
HC Davos 3	4 HC Lugano	OT
HC Lugano 2	3 HC Davos	n.P.
HC Davos 0	6 HC Lugano	
HC Lugano 6	5 HC Davos	
HC Davos 4	3 HC Lugano	
HC Lugano 4	3 HC Davos	
HC Lugano wins series 4–2

ZSC Lions vs. Kloten Flyers
Away	Home	
Kloten Flyers 1	3 ZSC Lions	
ZSC Lions 1	5 Kloten Flyers	
Kloten Flyers 3	2 ZSC Lions	n.P.
ZSC Lions 5	3 Kloten Flyers	
Kloten Flyers 1	2 ZSC Lions	
ZSC Lions 5	8 Kloten Flyers	
Kloten Flyers 3	1 ZSC Lions	
Kloten Flyers wins series 4–3

SC Bern (4) vs. EV Zug (5)
Date	Away	Home
EV Zug 2	3 SC Bern	
SC Bern 1	5 EV Zug	
EV Zug 3	4 SC Bern	OT
SC Bern 1	4 EV Zug	
EV Zug 5	2 SC Bern	
SC Bern 3	4 EV Zug	OT
EV Zug wins series 4–2

=== Semifinals ===
HC Ambri-Piotta vs. Kloten Flyers
Away	Home	
Kloten Flyers 1	3 HC Ambri-Piotta	
HC Ambri-Piotta 5	0 Kloten Flyers	
Kloten Flyers 3	2 HC Ambri-Piotta	OT
HC Ambri-Piotta 3	1 Kloten Flyers	n.P.
Kloten Flyers 1	3 HC Ambri-Piotta	
HC Ambri-Piotta wins series 4–1

HC Lugano vs. EV Zug
Date	Away	Home
EV Zug 6	7 HC Lugano	OT
HC Lugano 2	0 EV Zug	
EV Zug 1	3 HC Lugano	
HC Lugano 2	3 EV Zug	OT
EV Zug 1	6 HC Lugano	
HC Lugano wins series 4–1

=== Finals ===
HC Ambri-Piotta vs. HC Lugano
Away	Home	
HC Lugano 3	2 HC Ambri-Piotta	n.P.
HC Ambri-Piotta 5	3 HC Lugano	
HC Lugano 3	2 HC Ambri-Piotta	OT
HC Ambri-Piotta 0	4 HC Lugano	
HC Lugano 3	1 HC Ambri-Piotta	
HC Lugano wins series 4–1
