= 1992–93 AHL season =

- League: American Hockey League
- Sport: Ice hockey

Regular season
- F. G. "Teddy" Oke Trophy: Providence Bruins
- Season MVP: Don Biggs
- Top scorer: Don Biggs

Playoffs
- Playoffs MVP: Bill McDougall

Calder Cup
- Champions: Cape Breton Oilers
- Runners-up: Rochester Americans

AHL seasons
- 1991–92 1993–94

The 1992–93 AHL season was the 57th season of the American Hockey League. Sixteen teams played 80 games each in the schedule. The Binghamton Rangers finished first overall in the regular season with 124 points, a record which holds to this day. The Cape Breton Oilers won their first Calder Cup championship.

== Team changes ==
- The New Haven Nighthawks become the New Haven Senators.
- The Maine Mariners move to Providence, Rhode Island, becoming the Providence Bruins.
- The Hamilton Canucks join the AHL as an expansion team, based in Hamilton, Ontario, playing in the South Division.

== Final standings ==
- y– indicates team clinched division and a playoff spot
- x– indicates team clinched a playoff spot
- e– indicates team was eliminated from playoff contention

Atlantic Division	GP	W	L	T	Pts	GF	GA
y–St. John's Maple Leafs (TOR)	80	41	26	13	95	351	308
x–Fredericton Canadiens (MTL)	80	38	31	11	87	314	278
x–Cape Breton Oilers (EDM)	80	36	32	12	84	356	336
x–Moncton Hawks (WIN)	80	31	33	16	78	292	306
e–Halifax Citadels (QUE)	80	33	37	10	76	312	348

North Division	GP	W	L	T	Pts	GF	GA
y–Providence Bruins (BOS)	80	46	32	2	94	384	348
x–Adirondack Red Wings (DET)	80	36	35	9	81	331	308
x–Capital District Islanders (NYI)	80	34	34	12	80	280	285
x–Springfield Indians (HFD)	80	25	41	14	64	282	336
e–New Haven Senators (OTT)	80	22	47	11	55	262	343

South Division	GP	W	L	T	Pts	GF	GA
y–Binghamton Rangers (NYR)	80	57	13	10	124	392	246
x–Rochester Americans (BUF)	80	40	33	7	87	348	332
x–Utica Devils (NJD)	80	33	36	11	77	325	354
x–Baltimore Skipjacks (WSH)	80	28	40	12	68	318	353
e–Hershey Bears (PHI)	80	27	41	12	66	316	339
e–Hamilton Canucks (VAN)	80	29	45	6	64	284	327

== Scoring leaders ==
Note: GP = Games played; G = Goals; A = Assists; Pts = Points; PIM = Penalty minutes

Player	Team	GP	G	A	Pts	PIM
Don Biggs	Binghamton Rangers	78	54	84	138	112
Iain Fraser	Capital District Islanders	74	41	69	110	16
Tim Tookey	Hershey Bears	80	38	70	108	63
Chris Tancill	Adirondack Red Wings	68	59	43	102	62
Peter Ciavaglia	Rochester Americans	64	35	67	102	32
Brian McReynolds	Binghamton Rangers	79	30	70	100	88
Dan Currie	Cape Breton Oilers	75	57	41	98	73
Tim Sweeney	Providence Bruins	60	41	55	96	32
Yanic Perreault	St. John's Maple Leafs	79	49	46	95	56
Craig Duncanson	Binghamton Rangers	69	35	59	94	126

- complete list

== Calder Cup playoffs ==
Division semifinals
A1	St. John's	4
A4	Moncton	1
Atlantic Division
A2	Fredericton	1
A3	Cape Breton	4
N1	Providence	2
N4	Springfield	4
North Division
N2	Adirondack	4
N3	Capital District	0
S1	Binghamton	4
S4	Baltimore	3
South Division
S2	Rochester	4
S3	Utica	3

Division finals
A1	St. John's	0
A3	Cape Breton	4
N4	Springfield	4
N2	Adirondack	3
S1	Binghamton	3
S2	Rochester	4

Semifinals
A3	Cape Breton	2
N4	Springfield	0

Final
S2	Rochester	1
A3	Cape Breton	4

For the Semifinal round, the team that earned the most points during the regular season out of the three remaining teams receives a bye directly to the Calder Cup Final.

- Bill McDougall of the Cape Breton Oilers, recorded 26 goals, and 26 assists for 52 points in 16 games, setting a record for an average of 3.25 points per playoff game in professional hockey.

== Trophy and award winners ==
=== Team awards ===
Calder Cup; Playoff champions:	Cape Breton Oilers
Richard F. Canning Trophy; North division playoff champions:	Springfield Indians
Robert W. Clarke Trophy; South division playoff champions:	Rochester Americans
F. G. "Teddy" Oke Trophy; Regular Season champions, North Division:	Providence Bruins
John D. Chick Trophy; Regular Season champions, South Division:	Binghamton Rangers

=== Individual awards ===
Les Cunningham Award; Most valuable player:	Don Biggs - Binghamton Rangers
John B. Sollenberger Trophy; Top point scorer:	Don Biggs - Binghamton Rangers
Dudley "Red" Garrett Memorial Award; Rookie of the year:	Corey Hirsch - Binghamton Rangers
Eddie Shore Award; Defenceman of the year:	Bobby Dollas - Adirondack Red Wings
Aldege "Baz" Bastien Memorial Award; Best Goaltender:	Corey Hirsch - Binghamton Rangers
Harry "Hap" Holmes Memorial Award; Lowest goals against average:	Corey Hirsch & Boris Rousson - Binghamton Rangers
Louis A.R. Pieri Memorial Award; Coach of the year:	Marc Crawford - St. John's Maple Leafs
Fred T. Hunt Memorial Award; Sportsmanship / Perseverance:	Tim Tookey - Hershey Bears
Jack A. Butterfield Trophy; MVP of the playoffs:	Bill McDougall - Cape Breton Oilers

=== Other awards ===
James C. Hendy Memorial Award; Most outstanding executive:	Robert W. Clarke
James H. Ellery Memorial Awards; Outstanding media coverage:	Kevin Oklobzija, Rochester, (newspaper); John Colletto, Providence, (radio); Pyman Productions, (television)
Ken McKenzie Award; Outstanding marketing executive:	Catherine Galea, Hamilton Canucks & Jason Siegel, Binghamton Rangers

== See also ==
- List of AHL seasons

Preceded by 1991–92 AHL season	AHL seasons	Succeeded by 1993–94 AHL season
