= Fredericton Canadiens =

Former minor league hockey team

- City: Fredericton, New Brunswick
- League: American Hockey League
- Operated: 1990–1999
- Home arena: Aitken Centre
- Colours: Red, white and blue
- Affiliates: Montreal Canadiens

Franchise history
- 1969–1971: Montreal Voyageurs
- 1971–1984: Nova Scotia Voyageurs
- 1984–1990: Sherbrooke Canadiens
- 1990–1999: Fredericton Canadiens
- 1999–2002: Quebec Citadelles
- 2002–2015: Hamilton Bulldogs
- 2015–2017: St. John's IceCaps
- 2017–present: Laval Rocket

Championships
- Regular season titles: one: (1991–92)
- Division titles: one: (1991–92)

The Fredericton Canadiens, or the 'Baby Habs', were a professional ice hockey team in Fredericton, New Brunswick. The Canadiens played their home games at the Aitken Centre. They were a member of the American Hockey League from 1990 to 1999, and were a farm team of the Montreal Canadiens. As of 2025, they play as the Laval Rocket.

The team was previously the Sherbrooke Canadiens from 1984 to 1990. They moved to Fredericton in May 1990.

In 1995, the Canadiens played in the Calder Cup Finals, where they were swept in four games by the Albany River Rats.

In 1999, the team moved to Quebec City as the Quebec Citadelles, then to Hamilton in 2002 to become the Hamilton Bulldogs. They are now the Laval Rocket.

== Season-by-season results ==
=== Regular season ===
Season	Games	Won	Lost	Tied	OTL	Points	Goals for	Goals against	Standing
1990–91	80	36	35	9	—	81	295	292	4th, North
1991–92	80	43	27	10	—	96	314	254	1st, Atlantic
1992–93	80	38	31	11	—	87	314	278	2nd, Atlantic
1993–94	80	31	42	7	—	69	294	296	5th, Atlantic
1994–95	80	35	40	5	—	75	274	288	3rd, Atlantic
1995–96	80	34	35	11	—	79	307	308	4th, Atlantic
1996–97	80	26	44	8	2	62	234	283	4th, Canadian
1997–98	80	33	32	10	5	81	245	244	2nd, Atlantic
1998–99	80	33	36	6	5	77	246	246	3rd, Atlantic

=== Playoffs ===
Season	Prelim	1st round	2nd round	3rd round	Finals
1990–91	W, 12-7, MAINE^{†}	L, 3-4, SPR	—	—	—
1991–92	—	L, 3-4, MONC	—	—	—
1992–93	—	L, 1-4, CB	—	—	—
1993–94	Out of playoffs				
1994–95	—	W, 4-1, SJNL	W, 4-2, PEI	W, 2-0, CORN	L, 0-4, ALB
1995–96	—	W, 3-2, PEI	L, 1-4, SJNB	—	—
1996–97	Out of playoffs				
1997–98	—	L, 1-3, PORT	—	—	—
1998–99	—	W, 3-2, SJNL	W, 4-0, SJNB	L, 2-4, PROV	—

^{†} Two game combined total goals series.

== See also ==
- List of ice hockey teams in New Brunswick
