= Binghamton Rangers =

- City: Binghamton, New York, USA
- League: American Hockey League
- Operated: 1990–1997
- Home arena: Broome County Veterans Memorial Arena
- Colors: Red and Blue
- Owners: Paramount Communications (formerly Gulf+Western, 1990–1994); Viacom (1994); Cablevision (1994–1997)

Franchise history
- 1926–1976: Providence Reds
- 1976–1977: Rhode Island Reds
- 1977–1980: Binghamton Dusters
- 1980–1990: Binghamton Whalers
- 1990–1997: Binghamton Rangers
- 1997–2010: Hartford Wolf Pack
- 2010–2013: Connecticut Whale
- 2013–present: Hartford Wolf Pack

Championships
- Regular season titles: 1: (1992–93)
- Division titles: 4: (1991–92, 1992–93, 1994–95, 1995–96)

The Binghamton Rangers were an American professional ice hockey team in the American Hockey League. They played in Binghamton, New York, USA at the Broome County Veterans Memorial Arena.

== History ==
The market was previously served by:

Broome Dusters of the NAHL (1973–1977)
Binghamton Whalers of the American Hockey League (1980–1990)

The market was subsequently home to:

B.C. Icemen of the UHL (1997–2002)
Binghamton Senators of the American Hockey League (2002–2017)
Binghamton Devils of the American Hockey League (2017–2021)
Binghamton Black Bears of the Federal Prospects Hockey League (2021–Present)

== Season-by-season results ==
=== Regular season ===
Season	Games	Won	Lost	Tied	OTL	Points	Goals for	Goals against	Standing
1990–91	80	44	30	6	—	94	318	274	2nd, South
1991–92	80	41	30	9	—	91	318	277	1st, South
1992–93	80	57	13	10	—	124	392	246	1st, South
1993–94	80	33	38	9	—	75	312	322	5th, South
1994–95	80	43	30	7	—	93	302	261	1st, South
1995–96	80	39	31	7	3	88	333	331	1st, South
1996–97	80	27	38	13	2	69	245	300	5th, Empire State

=== Playoffs ===
Season	1st round	2nd round	3rd round	Finals
1990–91	W, 4–2, Baltimore	L, 0–4, Rochester	—	—
1991–92	W, 4–0, Utica	L, 3–4, Rochester	—	—
1992–93	W, 4–3, Baltimore	L, 3–4, Rochester	—	—
1993–94	Did not qualify			
1994–95	W, 4–1, Rochester	L, 2–4, Cornwall	—	—
1995–96	L, 1–3, Syracuse	—	—	—
1996–97	L, 1–3, St. John's	—	—	—

== Team records ==
=== Single season ===
Goals: 54 Don Biggs (1992–93)
Assists: 84 Don Biggs (1992–93)
Points: 138 Don Biggs (1992–93)
Penalty minutes: 361 Peter Fiorentino (1990–91)
GAA: 2.79 Corey Hirsch (1992–93)
SV%: .904 Corey Hirsch (1992–93)

=== Career ===
Career goals: 95 Jean-Yves Roy
Career assists: 146 Craig Duncanson
Career points: 227 Craig Duncanson
Career penalty minutes: 1581 Peter Fiorentino
Career goaltending wins: 71 Corey Hirsch
Career shutouts: 3 Dan Cloutier
Career games played: 386 Peter Fiorentino

=== American Hockey League Hall of Famers ===
AHL Hall of Fame Honored Members
Name	Seasons	Induction Year
Don Biggs	1991-93 (player)	2018
Ken Gernander	1994-97 (player)	2013
John Paddock	1990-91 (head coach)	2010
