= Moncton Hawks =

Former professional minor league ice hockey team in Moncton, New Brunswick, Canada

- City: Moncton, New Brunswick
- League: American Hockey League
- Operated: 1987–1994
- Home arena: Moncton Coliseum
- Colors: Blue, red
- Affiliates: Winnipeg Jets

Franchise history
- 1984–1987: Moncton Golden Flames
- 1987–1994: Moncton Hawks

The Moncton Hawks were a professional ice hockey team based in Moncton, New Brunswick. They played in the American Hockey League between 1987 and 1994, operating as a minor league affiliate of the Winnipeg Jets. Home games were played at the Moncton Coliseum. Previously, Moncton was home to the New Brunswick Hawks, Moncton Alpines, and Moncton Golden Flames.

== History ==
The name "Moncton Hawks" was the name of several previous senior league teams that played in the Maritime Senior Hockey League, Maritime Major Hockey League, New Brunswick Senior Hockey League, Atlantic Coast Senior League and Nova Scotia Senior Hockey League. These amateur teams operated from 1931 to 1979. The 1933 and 1934 teams won the Allan Cup senior men's Canadian championship. From 1978 to 1987, several American Hockey League teams operated in Moncton: the New Brunswick Hawks, Moncton Alpines and Moncton Golden Flames.

1993–94 logo

In 1987, the Winnipeg Jets signed an agreement with the local ownership group in Moncton to provide players for the Moncton AHL franchise after the Calgary Flames and Boston Bruins ended their affiliation and the team was renamed from the Golden Flames to the Hawks. The team operated for seven seasons, never finishing higher than third place in the division. The Hawks made the playoffs four of their first six years in the league, reaching the second round of the playoffs three of those years. The seventh season would be their most successful, and featured a new logo for 1993–94. The Hawks finished the regular season third place in the Atlantic Division, but eliminated two higher-seeded division foes before losing to the Portland Pirates in the Calder Cup finals.

Seeking to cut costs in a time when the AHL was beginning to withdraw from Atlantic Canada, the Jets folded the Hawks after the 1994 season, and joined with the Hartford Whalers in a dual affiliation with the expansion Springfield Falcons the following year.

The team featured several players who went on to have successful NHL careers including Kris Draper, Darryl Shannon, Stu Barnes and Dan Bylsma, who went on to win the Stanley Cup as head coach of the Pittsburgh Penguins.

In 1995, the Moncton Alpines of the QMJHL filled the void in the market that was left after the Hawks folded. That team later became the Moncton Wildcats.

=== American Hockey League Hall of Famers ===
AHL Hall of Fame Honored Members
Name	Seasons	Induction Year
Ken Gernander	1991-94 (player)	2013
Rob Murray	1991-94 (player)	2017

== Coaches ==
Multiple seasons in parentheses.

- 1987–1989 - Rick Bowness (2)
- 1989–1992 - Dave Farrish (3)
- 1992–1993 - Rob Laird
- 1993–1994 - Charlie Bourgeois

== Training staff ==
- 1989–1993 - Rob Snitzer, Wayne Flemming, Jamie Druet, Andrew Trites, Derek Robichaud
- 1993–1994 - Gord Hart, Wayne Flemming, David Lorette, Rob Cormier

== Season-by-season results ==
=== Regular season ===
Season	Games	Won	Lost	Tied	OTL	Points	Goals for	Goals against	Standing
1987–88	80	27	43	8	2	64	286	358	6th, North
1988–89	80	37	34	9	—	83	320	313	3rd, North
1989–90	80	33	42	5	—	71	265	303	6th, North
1990–91	80	36	32	12	—	84	270	267	3rd, North
1991–92	80	32	38	10	—	74	285	299	4th, Atlantic
1992–93	80	31	33	16	—	78	292	306	4th, Atlantic
1993–94	80	37	36	7	—	81	310	303	3rd, Atlantic

=== Playoffs ===
Season	1st round	2nd round	3rd round	Finals
1987–88	Out of playoffs			
1988–89	W, 4–0, Halifax	L, 2–4, New Haven	—	—
1989–90	Out of playoffs			
1990–91	W, 4–0, Cape Breton	L, 1–4, Springfield	—	—
1991–92	W, 4–3, Fredericton	L, 0–4, St. John's	—	—
1992–93	L, 1–4, St. John's	—	—	—
1993–94	W, 4–3, Saint John	W, 4–2, St. John's	W, 2–0, Cornwall	L, 2–4, Portland

== See also ==
- List of ice hockey teams in New Brunswick
