= Cape Breton Oilers =

Former American Hockey League team based in Sydney, Nova Scotia, Canada

- City: Sydney, Nova Scotia
- League: American Hockey League
- Operated: 1988–1996
- Home arena: Centre 200
- Colours: Orange and blue
- Affiliates: Edmonton Oilers

Franchise history
- 1984–1988: Nova Scotia Oilers
- 1988–1996: Cape Breton Oilers
- 1996–2003: Hamilton Bulldogs
- 2003–2004: Toronto Roadrunners
- 2004–2005: Edmonton Road Runners
- 2010–2015: Oklahoma City Barons
- 2015–present: Bakersfield Condors

Championships
- Calder Cups: 1 (1992–93)

The Cape Breton Oilers were a professional ice hockey team in the American Hockey League (AHL). The team was the top minor league affiliate of the Edmonton Oilers of the National Hockey League (NHL). The Oilers' organization relocated the team from Halifax, Nova Scotia, in 1988 and renamed it for Cape Breton Island. Home games were played at Centre 200 in Sydney, Nova Scotia, Canada. The team won the 1993 Calder Cup, the AHL championship. In 1996, the Oilers' organization relocated the team to Ontario to become the Hamilton Bulldogs.

== History ==
For eight seasons (1988–1996) they were the primary farm team of the Edmonton Oilers which was reflected in their logo and uniform design. While the Oilers never finished the regular season atop either their division or the league, they did capture the Calder Cup during the 1992–93 playoffs. The Cape Breton Oilers played in the rink by the name of Centre 200, now the home of the Cape Breton Eagles.

== Demise of the AHL in Atlantic Canada ==
When the Cape Breton Oilers vacated Nova Scotia for Hamilton in 1996 and became the Hamilton Bulldogs, it marked the beginning of the end for AHL hockey in Atlantic Canada for a time. Shortly thereafter, the Prince Edward Island Senators were suspended and eventually landed in New York as the Binghamton Senators. In 1999, the Fredericton Canadiens also moved west to become the Quebec Citadelles, later swapping its history with the Bulldogs and eventually ending up in Toronto, Edmonton, and Oklahoma. The Saint John Flames suspended operations in 2003 and then departed New Brunswick in 2005, eventually landing in Omaha, Nebraska for two seasons before moving to the Quad Cities and then to Abbotsford, British Columbia. The St. John's Maple Leafs were the last to leave the region in this wave, moving from Newfoundland and Labrador to Toronto in 2005 and being renamed the Marlies. The AHL would not return to Atlantic Canada until 2011 with the St. John's IceCaps. The majority of the former AHL markets in the region were replaced with Quebec Major Junior Hockey League franchises.

== 1992–93 Calder Cup ==
The Cape Breton Oilers 1992–93 playoffs were one of the most dominant in AHL history. In particular, during the 1993 playoffs, the Oilers posted a record of 14 wins and two losses, and were led by a playoff performance by forward Bill McDougall that remains virtually unparalleled in professional hockey to this date.

During the 16 games, McDougall scored 26 goals, and added 26 assists for 52 points. Fourteen years later, his records for goals, assists and points all stand, and his total of 3.25 points per game, is more than was ever matched in the NHL. Wayne Gretzky holds the NHL record with 47 points.

== Season-by-season results ==
- Nova Scotia Oilers 1984–1988
- Cape Breton Oilers 1988–1996

=== Regular season ===
Season	Games	Won	Lost	Tied	OTL	Points	Goals for	Goals against	Standing
1984–85	80	36	37	7	—	79	292	295	4th, North
1985–86	80	29	43	8	—	66	314	353	6th, North
1986–87	80	38	39	—	3	79	318	315	4th, North
1987–88	80	35	34	9	2	81	323	343	4th, North
1988–89	80	27	47	6	—	60	308	388	7th, North
1989–90	80	39	34	7	—	85	317	306	2nd, North
1990–91	80	41	31	8	—	90	306	301	2nd, North
1991–92	80	36	34	10	—	82	336	330	3rd, Atlantic
1992–93	80	36	32	12	—	84	356	336	3rd, Atlantic
1993–94	80	32	35	13	—	77	316	339	4th, Atlantic
1994–95	80	27	44	9	—	63	298	342	5th, Atlantic
1995–96	80	33	40	3	4	73	290	323	5th, Atlantic

=== Playoffs ===
Season	1st round	2nd round	3rd round	Finals
1984–85	L, 2-4, Maine	—	—	—
1985–86	Out of playoffs			
1986–87	L, 1-4, Sherbrooke	—	—	—
1987–88	L, 1-4, Maine	—	—	—
1988–89	Out of playoffs			
1989–90	L, 2-4, Springfield	—	—	—
1990–91	L, 0-4, Moncton	—	—	—
1991–92	L, 1-4, St. John's	—	—	—
1992–93	W, 4-1, Fredericton	W, 4-0, St. John's	W, 2-0, Springfield	W, 4-1, Rochester
1993–94	L, 1-4, St. John's	—	—	—
1994–95	Out of playoffs			
1995–96	Out of playoffs			

== Team records ==
=== Single season ===
Goals: 57, Dan Currie (1992–93)
Assists: 84, Shaun Van Allen (1991–92)
Points: 113, Shaun Van Allen (1991–92)
Penalty minutes: 422, Dennis Bonvie (1994–95)
GAA: 3.38, Mike Greenlay (1989–90)
SV%: .899, Eldon Reddick (1990–91)
Wins: 20, Wayne Cowley (1993–94)
Shutouts: 3, Jason Fitzsimmons (1995–96)

=== Career ===
Career goals: 219, Dan Currie
Career assists: 307, Shaun Van Allen
Career points: 432, Shaun Van Allen
Career penalty minutes: 969, Dennis Bonvie
Career goaltending wins: 35, Norm Foster
Career shutouts: 3, Jason Fitzsimmons
Career games: 366, Dan Currie

=== American Hockey League Hall of Famers ===
AHL Hall of Fame Honored Members
Name	Seasons	Induction Year
David Andrews	1988-94 (general manager)	2021
Dennis Bonvie	1993-96 (player)	2024
Peter White	1992-95 (player)	2013
Jim Wiemer	1988-89 (player)	2026

== Notable NHL alumni ==
List of Cape Breton Oilers alumni who played more than 100 games in Cape Breton and 100 or more games in the National Hockey League.

- Greg de Vries
- Wade Campbell
- Scott Ferguson
- Greg Hawgood
- Chris Joseph
- Francois Leroux
- Norm Maciver
- Kirk Maltby
- (Russia) Roman Oksiuta
- (United States) Shjon Podein
- Scott Thornton
- Shaun Van Allen
- Peter White
- Tyler Wright

== See also ==
- List of ice hockey teams in Nova Scotia
