= Bengt-Åke Gustafsson =

Swedish ice hockey player and coach

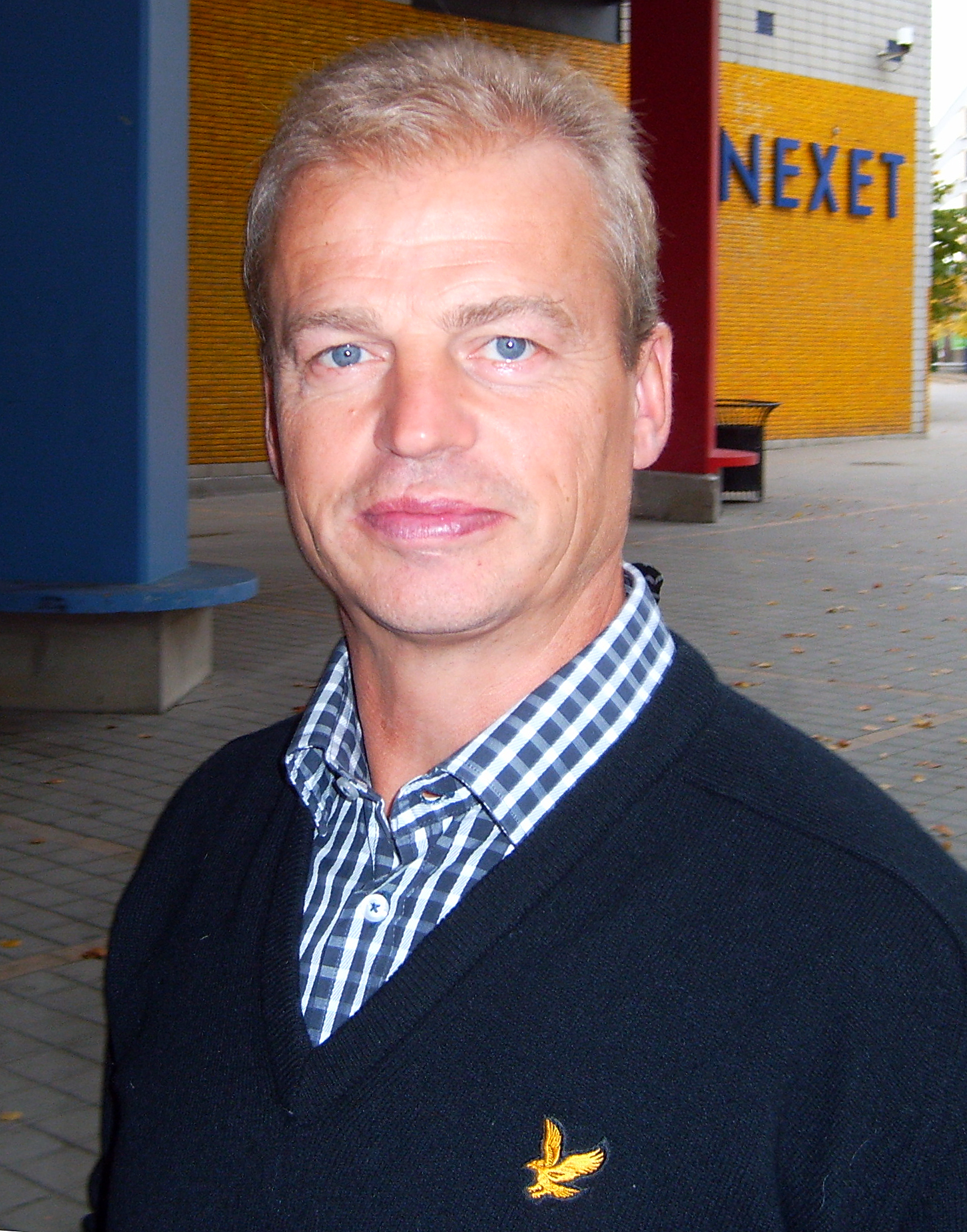
- Gustafsson in 2008
- Born: 23 March 1958 (age 68) Karlskoga, Sweden
- Height: 6 ft 0 in (183 cm)
- Weight: 185 lb (84 kg; 13 st 3 lb)
- Position: Centre
- Shot: Left
- Played for: KB Karlskoga; Färjestads BK; Edmonton Oilers; Washington Capitals; VEU Feldkirch
- National team: Sweden
- NHL draft: 55th overall, 1978; Washington Capitals
- Playing career: 1973–1999

Bengt-Åke Gustafsson (born 23 March 1958) is a Swedish professional ice hockey coach and former ice hockey player. Gustafsson is the former head coach of the Sweden senior team, a post he held from February 2005 to May 2010.

His North American career, which lasted from 1979 to 1989, included two games in the World Hockey Association (WHA) with the Edmonton Oilers, and then nine seasons in the National Hockey League (NHL) with the Washington Capitals. He was often called Bengt Gustafsson or Gus.

The Capitals selected Gustafsson's son, Anton Gustafsson, with the 21st overall pick in the 2008 NHL entry draft.

In 2003, Gustafsson was inducted into the IIHF Hall of Fame as a player.

== Playing career ==
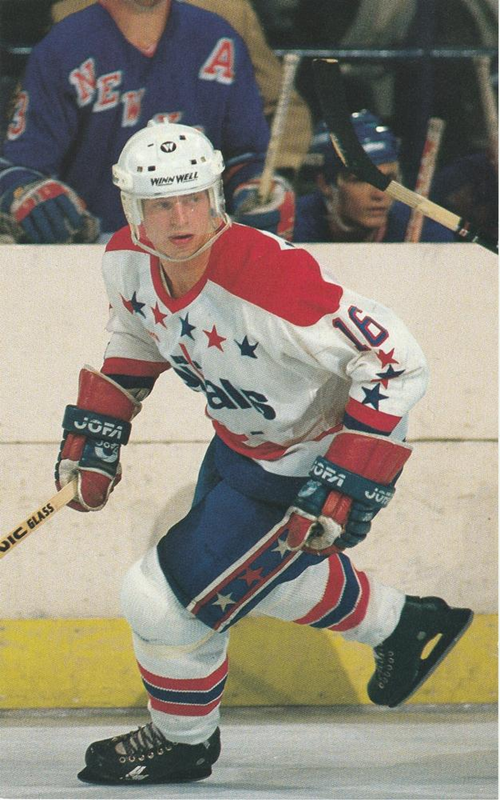
Gustafsson in 1987 photo for Washington Capitals

Gustafsson started his professional career in 1973, playing for KB Karlskoga in the Swedish second-tier league. He later transferred to Färjestads BK of the Elitserien. Gustafsson was drafted by the Washington Capitals in the fourth round of the 1978 NHL amateur draft. He chose to play the 1978–79 season in his homeland Sweden, but he signed with the Edmonton Oilers of the World Hockey Association (WHA) in March 1979. Gustafsson made his North American debut in the 1979 WHA playoffs, picking up a goal and two assists in two games. When the Oilers merged into the National Hockey League (NHL) that summer, despite their attempts to select him as one of their two protected skaters for the 1979 NHL expansion draft, the Capitals reclaimed Gustafsson's rights from Edmonton as they did not have a valid contract with him before the draft.

In the 1986–87 season, Gustafsson played for Bofors IK in the second-highest Swedish division and was selected for the Sweden senior team, which caused some controversy, before playing two more NHL seasons. After retiring from the NHL he played with Färjestads BK for the next four seasons, and then spent several years playing with VEU Feldkirch in the Austrian Hockey League and Alpenliga, winning five Austrian ice hockey championships and the 1997–98 European Hockey League championship.

== International play ==
Medal record

Representing Sweden

Men's ice hockey

World Championships
Gold medal – first place	1987 Austria	
Gold medal – first place	1991 Finland	
Silver medal – second place	1981 Soviet Union	
Bronze medal – third place	1979 Soviet Union	

Gustafsson played 117 games with Sweden senior team, and has played in five World Championships. In both 1987 and 1991, he won the gold medal, got silver in 1981, and bronze in 1979.

He also played in the Canada Cup in 1984 and 1987.

In 1992, he represented Sweden in the Winter Olympics.

== Coaching career ==
Gustafsson started his coaching career as an assistant coach with Switzerland senior team, serving under head coach Ralph Krueger. He attended five World Championships with the Swiss team between 1998 and 2002.

Additionally, Gustafsson worked as head coach of Austrian VEU Feldkirch in the 1998–99 season, followed by a two-year stint as head coach of SCL Tigers of the Swiss Nationalliga A (1999–2001). In 2001, he accepted the head coaching job at Färjestads BK in the Swedish Elitserien. He guided the team to the Swedish championship in 2002 and to back-to-back finals appearances the following two years.

Gustafsson was named head coach of the Swedish senior team in 2005. Under his guidance, Sweden captured gold at the 2006 Winter Olympics and the 2006 World Championships, becoming the first coach to achieve this "double". He earned Swedish Coach of the Year honours that year. Gustafsson also led Sweden to a bronze medal at the 2009 World Championships. He stepped down from his position in 2010.

In October 2010, he took over as head coach of the ZSC Lions of the Swiss National League A (NLA) and remained in the job until the end of the 2010–11 season.

On 6 May 2011, Gustafsson was named the head coach of Atlant Moscow Oblast of the Kontinental Hockey League (KHL), becoming the first Swede to be named the head coach of a KHL team. However, after a disappointing start to the 2011–12 season for the team, Gustafsson was forced to leave the club on 3 November 2011. The team's then assistant coach Janne Karlsson took over the head coaching job for Atlant Moscow Oblast.

In December 2012, he replaced Jeff Tomlinson as head coach of the Thomas Sabo Ice Tigers of the German Deutsche Eishockey Liga (DEL). After the season, Gustafsson did not have his contract renewed.

In October 2013, he returned to Switzerland's SCL Tigers for a second spell with the club, having previously spent two years with the Tigers. He led SCL to the National League B (NLB) title and promotion to the NLA in 2015, but parted company with the club despite the success. On 24 January 2017, he took over the head coaching position at NLB side EHC Olten. He was sacked in early February 2018 following a run of five wins in 15 contests and after dropping to the fourth place of the NLB standings.

== Coaching style ==
He has been reported as a "player's coach", listening to and arguing with his players rather than telling them what to do. In a SVT interview he stated: "[Ice] hockey is played on the ice, not behind the bench. As coach I can point things out to them and make them aware of stuff but they are the ones who play the game. As a player I have to confess that I didn't listen that much to what the coach said, and as a coach I don't expect them to do either."

He was criticised for asking various players whom they would like to see on the team and how they wanted to play and for asking players how they would like to see the lines formed. He then went in and adjusted the lines as the tournaments went on. The criticism has been somewhat subdued after his 2006 Winter Olympics and World Championships double.

The Olympic and IIHF teams only had eight players. Most of the stars from the Olympics were missing. Only Jörgen Jönsson, Kenny Jönsson, Henrik Zetterberg, Niklas Kronwall, Mikael Samuelsson, Stefan Liv, Ronnie Sundin and Mika Hannula participated in both tournaments.

== Awards and achievements ==
=== As player ===
- Named to the 1977 World Junior Championships All-Star team
- Named to the Swedish All-Star team in 1983 and 1987
- Awarded Guldhjälmen in 1990
- 5-time Austrian champion with VEU Feldkirch (1994, 1995, 1996, 1997, 1998)
- European Hockey League champion in 1998
- Named to the Alpenliga All-Star team in 1997
- Inducted into the IIHF Hall of Fame in 2003

=== As coach ===
- Elitserien champion with Färjestads BK in 2002
- Won gold medal in the 2006 Winter Olympics
- Won gold medal in the 2006 World Championships
- Won bronze medal in the 2009 and 2010 World Championships
- Named as Swedish Coach of the Year in 2006
- National League B with SCL Tigers in 2015

== Records ==
- Washington Capitals record for points by a rookie with 60 in 1979–80 (broken in 1981–82)
- Scored the fastest goal from the start of a period (5 seconds in the third period) against the Philadelphia Flyers on 18 January 1983
- First coach in history to win the Winter Olympics and the World Championships in the same year (2006)

== Career statistics ==
=== Regular season and playoffs ===
			Regular season					Playoffs
Season	Team	League	GP	G	A	Pts	PIM	GP	G	A	Pts	PIM
1973–74	KB Karlskoga	SWE II	8	1	4	5	0	6	1	1	2	0
1974–75	KB Karlskoga	SWE	18	4	5	9	2	—	—	—	—	—
1975–76	KB Karlskoga	SWE II	11	7	3	10	—	—	—	—	—	—
1976–77	KB Karlskoga	SWE II	22	32	18	50	—	11	7	7	14	—
1977–78	Färjestads BK	SEL	32	15	10	25	10	7	2	6	8	10
1978–79	Färjestads BK	SEL	33	13	11	24	10	3	2	0	2	4
1978–79	Edmonton Oilers	WHA	—	—	—	—	—	2	1	2	3	0
1979–80	Washington Capitals	NHL	80	22	38	60	17	—	—	—	—	—
1980–81	Washington Capitals	NHL	72	21	34	55	26	—	—	—	—	—
1981–82	Washington Capitals	NHL	70	26	34	60	40	—	—	—	—	—
1982–83	Washington Capitals	NHL	67	22	42	64	16	4	0	1	1	4
1983–84	Washington Capitals	NHL	69	32	43	75	16	5	2	3	5	0
1984–85	Washington Capitals	NHL	51	13	29	42	8	5	1	3	4	0
1985–86	Washington Capitals	NHL	70	23	52	75	26	—	—	—	—	—
1986–87	Bofors IK	SWE II	28	16	26	42	22	—	—	—	—	—
1987–88	Washington Capitals	NHL	78	18	36	54	29	—	—	—	—	—
1988–89	Washington Capitals	NHL	72	18	51	69	18	4	2	3	5	6
1989–90	Färjestads BK	SEL	37	22	24	46	14	10	4	10	14	18
1990–91	Färjestads BK	SEL	37	9	21	30	6	8	3	6	9	2
1991–92	Färjestads BK	SEL	35	12	20	32	30	6	2	5	7	2
1992–93	Färjestads BK	SEL	40	17	14	31	32	3	0	1	1	2
1993–94	VEU Feldkirch	Alpenliga	28	9	32	41	8	—	—	—	—	—
1993–94	VEU Feldkirch	AUT	26	11	11	22	33	—	—	—	—	—
1994–95	VEU Feldkirch	Alpenliga	17	12	17	29	8	—	—	—	—	—
1994–95	VEU Feldkirch	AUT	24	9	25	34	14	13	9	13	22	2
1995–96	VEU Feldkirch	Alpenliga	7	8	8	16	2	—	—	—	—	—
1995–96	VEU Feldkirch	AUT	36	20	46	66	12	4	1	5	6	2
1996–97	VEU Feldkirch	Alpenliga	40	21	41	62	10	—	—	—	—	—
1996–97	VEU Feldkirch	AUT	11	3	13	16	0	—	—	—	—	—
1997–98	VEU Feldkirch	Alpenliga	36	6	15	21	10	—	—	—	—	—
1997–98	VEU Feldkirch	AUT	18	4	15	19	6	—	—	—	—	—
1998–99	VEU Feldkirch	Alpenliga	2	0	0	0	0	—	—	—	—	—
SEL totals			195	84	95	179	100	37	13	28	41	38
WHA totals			—	—	—	—	—	2	1	2	3	0
NHL totals			629	196	359	555	196	18	5	10	15	10
AUT totals			115	47	110	157	65	17	10	18	28	4

=== International ===
Year	Team	Event	GP	G	A	Pts	PIM
1976	Sweden	EJC	5	3	2	5	2
1976	Sweden	WJC	4	2	1	3	10
1977	Sweden	WJC	7	2	2	4	6
1978	Sweden	WJC	7	2	6	8	10
1979	Sweden	WC	8	4	2	6	0
1981	Sweden	WC	6	3	1	4	8
1983	Sweden	WC	10	2	7	9	6
1984	Sweden	CC	5	1	3	4	2
1987	Sweden	WC	10	3	8	11	4
1987	Sweden	CC	6	3	0	3	4
1991	Sweden	WC	10	0	5	5	6
1992	Sweden	OLY	6	0	1	1	0
Junior totals			23	9	11	20	28
Senior totals			61	16	27	43	30
