= Simon Wheeldon =

Canadian-Austrian ice hockey player

- Born: August 30, 1966 (age 60) Vancouver, British Columbia, Canada
- Height: 6 ft 0 in (183 cm)
- Weight: 185 lb (84 kg; 13 st 3 lb)
- Position: Left wing
- Shot: Left
- Played for: New York Rangers; Winnipeg Jets; VEU Feldkirch; Munich Barons
- National team: Austria
- NHL draft: 229th overall, 1984; Edmonton Oilers
- Playing career: 1985–2004

Simon Wheeldon (born August 30, 1966) is a Canadian-born Austrian former professional ice hockey player. He played 15 games in the National Hockey League (NHL) for the New York Rangers and Winnipeg Jets from 1988 to 1990. The rest of his career, which lasted from 1985 to 2004, was mainly spent in the Austrian Hockey League. Born in Canada Wheeldon represented Austria in international tournaments, including the 1998 and 2002 Winter Olympics.

== Career statistics ==
=== Regular season and playoffs ===
			Regular season					Playoffs
Season	Team	League	GP	G	A	Pts	PIM	GP	G	A	Pts	PIM
1982–83	Kelowna Buckaroos	BCHL	55	30	44	74	74	—	—	—	—	—
1983–84	Victoria Cougars	WHL	56	14	24	38	43	—	—	—	—	—
1984–85	Victoria Cougars	WHL	67	50	76	126	78	—	—	—	—	—
1984–85	Cape Breton Oilers	AHL	4	0	1	1	0	1	0	0	0	0
1985–86	Victoria Cougars	WHL	70	61	96	157	85	—	—	—	—	—
1986–87	Flint Spirits	IHL	41	17	53	70	20	—	—	—	—	—
1986–87	New Haven Nighthawks	AHL	38	11	28	39	39	5	0	0	0	6
1987–88	New York Rangers	NHL	5	0	1	1	4	—	—	—	—	—
1987–88	Colorado Rangers	IHL	69	45	54	99	80	13	8	11	19	12
1988–89	New York Rangers	NHL	6	0	1	1	2	—	—	—	—	—
1988–89	Denver Rangers	IHL	74	50	56	106	77	4	0	2	2	6
1989–90	Flint Spirits	IHL	76	34	49	83	61	4	1	2	3	2
1990–91	Winnipeg Jets	NHL	4	0	0	0	4	—	—	—	—	—
1990–91	Moncton Hawks	AHL	66	30	38	68	38	8	4	3	7	2
1991–92	Baltimore Skipjacks	AHL	78	38	53	91	62	—	—	—	—	—
1992–93	VEU Feldkirch	ALP	30	19	32	51	38	—	—	—	—	—
1992–93	VEU Feldkirch	AUT	20	10	25	35		—	—	—	—	—
1993–94	VEU Feldkirch	ALP	28	24	20	44	30	—	—	—	—	—
1993–94	VEU Feldkirch	AUT	27	19	26	45	24	—	—	—	—	—
1994–95	VEU Feldkirch	ALP	17	24	15	39	24	—	—	—	—	—
1994–95	VEU Feldkirch	AUT	45	32	39	71	38	—	—	—	—	—
1995–96	VEU Feldkirch	ALP	8	13	11	24	6	—	—	—	—	—
1995–96	VEU Feldkirch	AUT	37	35	50	85	32	—	—	—	—	—
1996–97	VEU Feldkirch	ALP	45	32	39	71	38	—	—	—	—	—
1996–97	VEU Feldkirch	AUT	11	9	5	14	14	—	—	—	—	—
1997–98	VEU Feldkirch	ALP	16	8	9	17	30	5	4	10	14
1997–98	VEU Feldkirch	AUT	21	13	14	27	24	—	—	—	—	—
1998–99	VEU Feldkirch	ALP	35	19	30	49	46	—	—	—	—	—
1998–99	VEU Feldkirch	AUT	17	6	7	13	22	—	—	—	—	—
1999–00	München Barons	DEL	56	26	34	60	85	12	2	6	8	8
2000–01	München Barons	DEL	57	9	37	46	74	11	2	6	8	20
2001–02	München Barons	DEL	57	9	26	35	81	9	2	3	5	14
2002–03	VEU Feldkirch	AUT	40	11	21	32	52	3	1	0	1	4
2003–04	VEU Feldkirch	EBEL	46	10	19	29	78	—	—	—	—	—
NHL totals			15	0	2	2	10	—	—	—	—	—
IHL totals			260	146	212	358	238	21	9	15	24	20
AUT/EBEL totals			264	135	187	322	284	3	1	0	1	4

=== International ===
Year	Team	Event	GP	G	A	Pts	PIM
1997	Austria	OGQ	4	2	0	2	14
1997	Austria	WC B	7	4	0	4	2
1998	Austria	OLY	4	0	1	1	8
1998	Austria	WC	3	1	0	1	2
2000	Austria	WC	5	1	3	4	10
2001	Austria	WC	6	1	2	3	2
2002	Austria	OLY	4	1	1	2	4
Senior totals			33	10	7	17	42

== Awards ==
- WHL West Second All-Star Team – 1985 & 1986
