= Christoph Brandner =

Austrian ice hockey player (born 1975)

- Born: 5 July 1975 (age 50) Bruck an der Mur, Austria
- Height: 6 ft 5 in (196 cm)
- Weight: 214 lb (97 kg; 15 st 4 lb)
- Position: Left wing
- Shot: Left
- Played for: EC KAC; Krefeld Pinguine; Minnesota Wild; Södertälje SK; Hamburg Freezers
- National team: Austria
- NHL draft: 237th overall, 2002; Minnesota Wild
- Playing career: 1994–2012

Christoph Brandner (born 5 July 1975) is an Austrian former professional ice hockey winger.

Brandner had the most goals while playing for Krefeld Pinguine team of the German DEL. He was drafted by the Minnesota Wild in the eighth round of the 2002 NHL entry draft, the 237th overall pick and became first Austrian hockey player to score a goal in the NHL, when he was playing in the 2003–04 season with the Minnesota Wild. After the NHL Lockout he signed with Södertälje SK of the Swedish Elitserien. He later returned to his longtime original Austrian team, EC KAC, where he was a cult player. Brandner retired on 2 April 2012, and remained with Klagenfurt where he is currently a Developmental Coach.

== Career statistics ==
=== Regular season and playoffs ===
			Regular season					Playoffs
Season	Team	League	GP	G	A	Pts	PIM	GP	G	A	Pts	PIM
1990–91	Kapfenberger SV	AUT.2	—	—	—	—	—	—	—	—	—	—
1991–92	Kapfenberger SV	AUT.2	—	—	—	—	—	—	—	—	—	—
1992–93	Kapfenberger SV	AUT.2	—	—	—	—	—	—	—	—	—	—
1993–94	Kapfenberger SV	AUT.2	—	—	—	—	—	—	—	—	—	—
1994–95	Kapfenberger SV	AUT	30	12	10	22	—	—	—	—	—	—
1995–96	Kapfenberger SV	AUT	33	11	4	15	12	—	—	—	—	—
1996–97	EC KAC	AUT	—	—	—	—	—	—	—	—	—	—
1996–97	EC KAC	Alp	—	—	—	—	—	—	—	—	—	—
1997–98	EC KAC	AUT	27	12	7	19	18	—	—	—	—	—
1997–98	EC KAC	Alp	—	—	—	—	—	—	—	—	—	—
1998–99	EC KAC	AUT	21	8	8	16	6	—	—	—	—	—
1998–99	EC KAC	Alp	33	23	10	33	16	—	—	—	—	—
1999–2000	EC KAC	AUT	16	8	3	11	20	—	—	—	—	—
1999–2000	EC KAC	IEHL	34	29	19	48	30	—	—	—	—	—
2000–01	Krefeld Pinguine	DEL	59	24	24	48	34	—	—	—	—	—
2000–01	EC KAC	AUT	6	2	4	8	4	—	—	—	—	—
2001–02	Krefeld Pinguine	DEL	50	30	25	55	20	3	1	0	1	4
2002–03	Krefeld Pinguine	DEL	49	28	17	45	26	14	9	9	18	8
2003–04	Minnesota Wild	NHL	35	4	5	9	8	—	—	—	—	—
2003–04	Houston Aeros	AHL	37	7	7	14	18	2	1	0	1	0
2004–05	Houston Aeros	AHL	26	5	3	8	15	—	—	—	—	—
2005–06	Södertälje SK	SEL	25	3	2	5	10	—	—	—	—	—
2006–07	Hamburg Freezers	DEL	48	22	10	32	16	7	1	1	2	6
2007–08	Hamburg Freezers	DEL	47	18	20	38	36	8	3	2	5	6
2008–09	EC KAC	AUT	47	19	23	42	46	11	6	1	7	6
2009–10	EC KAC	AUT	28	13	6	19	20	7	2	2	4	6
2010–11	EC KAC	AUT	42	18	11	29	32	15	8	4	12	4
2011–12	EC KAC	AUT	47	10	11	21	16	15	0	2	2	6
AUT totals			297	113	87	200	243	48	16	9	25	22
DEL totals			253	122	96	218	132	32	14	12	26	24

=== International ===
Year	Team	Event	GP	G	A	Pts	PIM
1993	Austria	WJC B	7	3	2	5	4
1993	Austria	EJC B	7	2	2	4	6
1994	Austria	WJC B	7	7	2	9	8
1995	Austria	WJC B	7	5	1	6	30
1997	Austria	WC B	7	1	2	3	0
1998	Austria	OG	4	0	0	0	2
1998	Austria	WC	3	0	1	1	4
1999	Austria	WC	6	0	4	4	6
2000	Austria	WC	6	4	0	4	4
2001	Austria	OGQ	3	4	1	5	0
2001	Austria	WC	6	0	2	2	2
2002	Austria	OG	4	0	1	1	2
2002	Austria	WC	6	1	4	5	0
2003	Austria	WC	6	2	0	2	2
2008	Austria	WC D1	5	4	1	5	6
Junior totals			28	17	7	24	48
Senior totals			56	16	16	32	28
