= Dominic Lavoie =

Canadian-born Austrian ice hockey player

- Born: November 21, 1967 (age 57); Montreal, Quebec, Canada
- Height: 6 ft 2 in (188 cm)
- Weight: 205 lb (93 kg; 14 st 9 lb)
- Position: Defence
- Shot: Right
- Played for: St. Louis Blues; Ottawa Senators; Boston Bruins; Los Angeles Kings
- National team: Austria
- NHL draft: Undrafted
- Playing career: 1987–2004; 2010–2011

Joseph Gilles Dominic Lavoie (born November 21, 1967) is a Canadian-born Austrian former professional ice hockey player. Lavoie played 38 games in the National Hockey League between 1988 and 1994 for the St. Louis Blues, Ottawa Senators, Boston Bruins and Los Angeles Kings. He scored five goals and thirteen points, collecting 32 penalty minutes. The rest of his career, which lasted from 1987 to 2004 and briefly from 2010 to 2011, was mainly spent in the International Hockey League and later in Austria and Germany. Internationally Lavoie, who became a naturalized Austrian citizen, he represented the Austrian national team at the 1998 and 2002 Winter Olympics, as well as at four World Championships.

== Career ==
=== Junior hockey ===
As a youth, Lavoie played in the 1980 Quebec International Pee-Wee Hockey Tournament with a minor ice hockey team from Richelieu, Quebec. The Montreal native played major junior hockey with the Quebec Major Junior Hockey League's (QMJHL) St-Jean Castors.

=== Professional ===
Lavoie was signed as an undrafted free agent by the St. Louis Blues of the National Hockey League (NHL) in September 1986 as part of general manager Ron Caron's effort to retool the team. He was assigned to the Blues' International Hockey League (IHL) affiliate, the Peoria Rivermen, to develop. Lavoie made his NHL debut on April 2, 1989 in a 4–2 victory over the Detroit Red Wings. He spent the following four seasons split between St. Louis and Peoria. Lavoie scored his first NHL goal in his 1989–90 season debut on the power play, assisted by Brett Hull and Adam Oates, in a 5–3 loss to the Hartford Whalers on November 30, 1989. He was a part of Peoria's Turner Cup championship in 1991. He was named to the IHL's First All-Star Team at season's end. For the 1991–92 season Lavoie was one of the contenders to replace the departed Scott Stevens on the Blues defence. However, he missed three weeks with a broken heel and then spent the next two weeks in Peoria rehabbing it. After Paul Cavallini went down with an injury, Lavoie was among the young defenceman used to replace him in the lineup. However, upon Cavallini's return on November 20, Lavoie was sent to Peoria again. Lavoie played in the 1992 IHL All-Star game for the Western Conference in February 1992. He was named to the IHL's All-Star Second Team in April 1992 and helped Peoria advance to the Turner Cup final again.

Lavoie was left unprotected in the 1992 NHL expansion draft by the Blues and was selected by the Ottawa Senators. He was initially assigned to the Senators American Hockey League (AHL) affiliate, the New Haven Senators, to begin the 1992–93 season. After 14 games, where Lavoie was the team's fourth leading scorer, he was recalled to Ottawa on November 12, 1992. He made his Ottawa debut on November 13 in a 1–0 loss to the Tampa Bay Lightning. In his second game on November 15, Lavoie registered his only point with the Senators, assisting on Neil Brady's goal in a 7–2 loss to the Philadelphia Flyers. After appearing in the two games with Ottawa and being scratched for a third he was placed on waivers and claimed by the Boston Bruins on November 21.

Lavoie made his Bruins debut on November 23 in a 3–2 win over his former team, the Ottawa Senators. His coach, Brian Sutter, said of him, "...he can just pound the puck...But he has to move his feet. If he doesn't move his feet, he's very average." Lavoie played in one more game with the Bruins, going scoreless. He was assigned to Boston's AHL affiliate, the Providence Bruins on December 2 and spent the rest of the season there and appeared in the Calder Cup playoffs.

He was signed as an unrestricted free agent by the Los Angeles Kings in July 1993. Lavoie scored a hat trick versus the Detroit Red Wings in a 10–3 victory on October 11, 1993. He was assigned to the Kings IHL affiliate, the Phoenix Roadrunners, and took part in the 1993–94 IHL All-Star game and skills competition where he won the hardest shot competition. He was traded by Phoenix to the San Diego Gulls for Daniel Shank at the IHL trade deadline on March 24, 1994.

Beginning in 1994–95 he played five years with VEU Feldkirch of the Austrian Hockey League, which also played in the Alpenliga. With Feldkirch, he won both the Austrian League and the Alpenliga four times. Lavoie also won the European Hockey League title with VEU Feldkirch in 1998. Lavoie signed with the German Deutsche Eishockey Liga's Hannover Scorpions in 1999. He returned to VEU Feldkirch and last played for them in the 2003–04 season. However, in 2010, Lavoie made a three-game appearance with VEU Feldkirch.

== International play ==
Lavoie joined the Austrian national team for the 1998 Winter Olympics in Nagano, Japan. He led all defencemen in the tournament with five goals. He also appeared for Austria at the 1999 and 2000 World Championships. He appeared again for Austria at the 2002 Winter Olympics.

== Personal life ==
After retiring, Lavoie and his wife and children moved to El Dorado, California, where he worked for United Guaranty Corporation. He was named to the Peoria Rivermen hall of fame in 1998.

== Career statistics ==
=== Regular season and playoffs ===
| | | | Regular season | | | | | Playoffs |
| Season | Team | League | GP | G | A | Pts | PIM | GP | G | A | Pts | PIM |
|---|---|---|---|---|---|---|---|---|---|---|---|---|
| 1984–85 | Saint-Jean Castors | QMJHL | 30 | 1 | 1 | 2 | 10 | — | — | — | — | — |
| 1985–86 | Saint-Jean Castors | QMJHL | 70 | 12 | 37 | 49 | 99 | 10 | 2 | 3 | 5 | 20 |
| 1986–87 | Saint-Jean Castors | QMJHL | 64 | 12 | 42 | 54 | 97 | 8 | 2 | 7 | 9 | 2 |
| 1987–88 | Peoria Rivermen | IHL | 65 | 7 | 26 | 33 | 54 | 7 | 2 | 2 | 4 | 8 |
| 1988–89 | St. Louis Blues | NHL | 1 | 0 | 0 | 0 | 0 | — | — | — | — | — |
| 1988–89 | Peoria Rivermen | IHL | 69 | 11 | 31 | 42 | 98 | 4 | 0 | 0 | 0 | 4 |
| 1989–90 | St. Louis Blues | NHL | 13 | 1 | 1 | 2 | 16 | — | — | — | — | — |
| 1989–90 | Peoria Rivermen | IHL | 69 | 11 | 31 | 42 | 98 | 5 | 2 | 2 | 4 | 16 |
| 1990–91 | St. Louis Blues | NHL | 6 | 1 | 2 | 3 | 2 | — | — | — | — | — |
| 1990–91 | Peoria Rivermen | IHL | 46 | 15 | 25 | 40 | 72 | 16 | 5 | 7 | 12 | 22 |
| 1991–92 | St. Louis Blues | NHL | 6 | 0 | 1 | 1 | 10 | — | — | — | — | — |
| 1991–92 | Peoria Rivermen | IHL | 58 | 20 | 32 | 52 | 87 | 10 | 3 | 4 | 7 | 12 |
| 1992–93 | Ottawa Senators | NHL | 2 | 0 | 1 | 1 | 0 | — | — | — | — | — |
| 1992–93 | New Haven Senators | AHL | 14 | 2 | 7 | 9 | 14 | — | — | — | — | — |
| 1992–93 | Boston Bruins | NHL | 2 | 0 | 0 | 0 | 2 | — | — | — | — | — |
| 1992–93 | Providence Bruins | AHL | 53 | 16 | 27 | 43 | 62 | 6 | 1 | 2 | 3 | 24 |
| 1993–94 | Los Angeles Kings | NHL | 8 | 3 | 3 | 6 | 2 | — | — | — | — | — |
| 1993–94 | Phoenix Roadrunners | IHL | 58 | 20 | 33 | 53 | 70 | — | — | — | — | — |
| 1993–94 | San Diego Gulls | IHL | 9 | 2 | 2 | 4 | 12 | 8 | 1 | 0 | 1 | 20 |
| 1994–95 | VEU Feldkirch | AL | 17 | 9 | 15 | 24 | 30 | — | — | — | — | — |
| 1994–95 | VEU Feldkirch | AUT | 28 | 12 | 13 | 25 | 79 | — | — | — | — | — |
| 1995–96 | VEU Feldkirch | AL | 8 | 5 | 7 | 12 | 14 | — | — | — | — | — |
| 1995–96 | VEU Feldkirch | AUT | 35 | 20 | 33 | 53 | 75 | — | — | — | — | — |
| 1996–97 | VEU Feldkirch | AL | 43 | 18 | 29 | 47 | 46 | — | — | — | — | — |
| 1996–97 | VEU Feldkirch | AUT | 11 | 2 | 4 | 6 | 29 | — | — | — | — | — |
| 1997–98 | VEU Feldkirch | AL | 21 | 8 | 8 | 16 | 12 | — | — | — | — | — |
| 1997–98 | VEU Feldkirch | AUT | 15 | 5 | 6 | 11 | 16 | — | — | — | — | — |
| 1998–99 | VEU Feldkirch | AL | 32 | 14 | 14 | 28 | 18 | — | — | — | — | — |
| 1998–99 | VEU Feldkirch | AUT | 17 | 2 | 9 | 11 | 22 | — | — | — | — | — |
| 1999–2000 | Hannover Scorpions | DEL | 55 | 19 | 21 | 40 | 120 | — | — | — | — | — |
| 2000–01 | Hannover Scorpions | DEL | 59 | 8 | 24 | 32 | 86 | 6 | 3 | 0 | 3 | 12 |
| 2001–02 | Hannover Scorpions | DEL | 57 | 12 | 27 | 39 | 56 | — | — | — | — | — |
| 2002–03 | VEU Feldkirch | AUT | 42 | 12 | 30 | 42 | 74 | 3 | 0 | 1 | 1 | 4 |
| 2003–04 | VEU Feldkirch | AUT | 40 | 2 | 9 | 11 | 40 | — | — | — | — | — |
| 2010–11 | VEU Feldkirch | AUT-2 | 3 | 2 | 0 | 2 | 2 | — | — | — | — | — |
| IHL totals | | | 363 | 94 | 172 | 266 | 425 | 50 | 13 | 15 | 28 | 82 |
| AUT totals | | | 188 | 55 | 104 | 159 | 335 | 3 | 0 | 1 | 1 | 4 |
| NHL totals | | | 38 | 5 | 8 | 13 | 32 | — | — | — | — | — |

=== International ===
| Year | Team | Event | GP | G | A | Pts | PIM |
|---|---|---|---|---|---|---|---|
| 1998 | Austria | OG | 4 | 5 | 1 | 6 | 8 |
| 1999 | Austria | WC | 6 | 2 | 0 | 2 | 8 |
| 2000 | Austria | WC | 6 | 0 | 1 | 1 | 12 |
| 2001 | Austria | OGQ | 3 | 0 | 1 | 1 | 10 |
| 2001 | Austria | WC | 6 | 0 | 0 | 0 | 14 |
| 2002 | Austria | OG | 4 | 0 | 1 | 1 | 2 |
| 2002 | Austria | WC | 6 | 1 | 4 | 5 | 12 |
| Senior totals | | | 35 | 8 | 8 | 16 | 66 |
