= Brad Schlegel =

Canadian former ice hockey defenceman (born 1968)

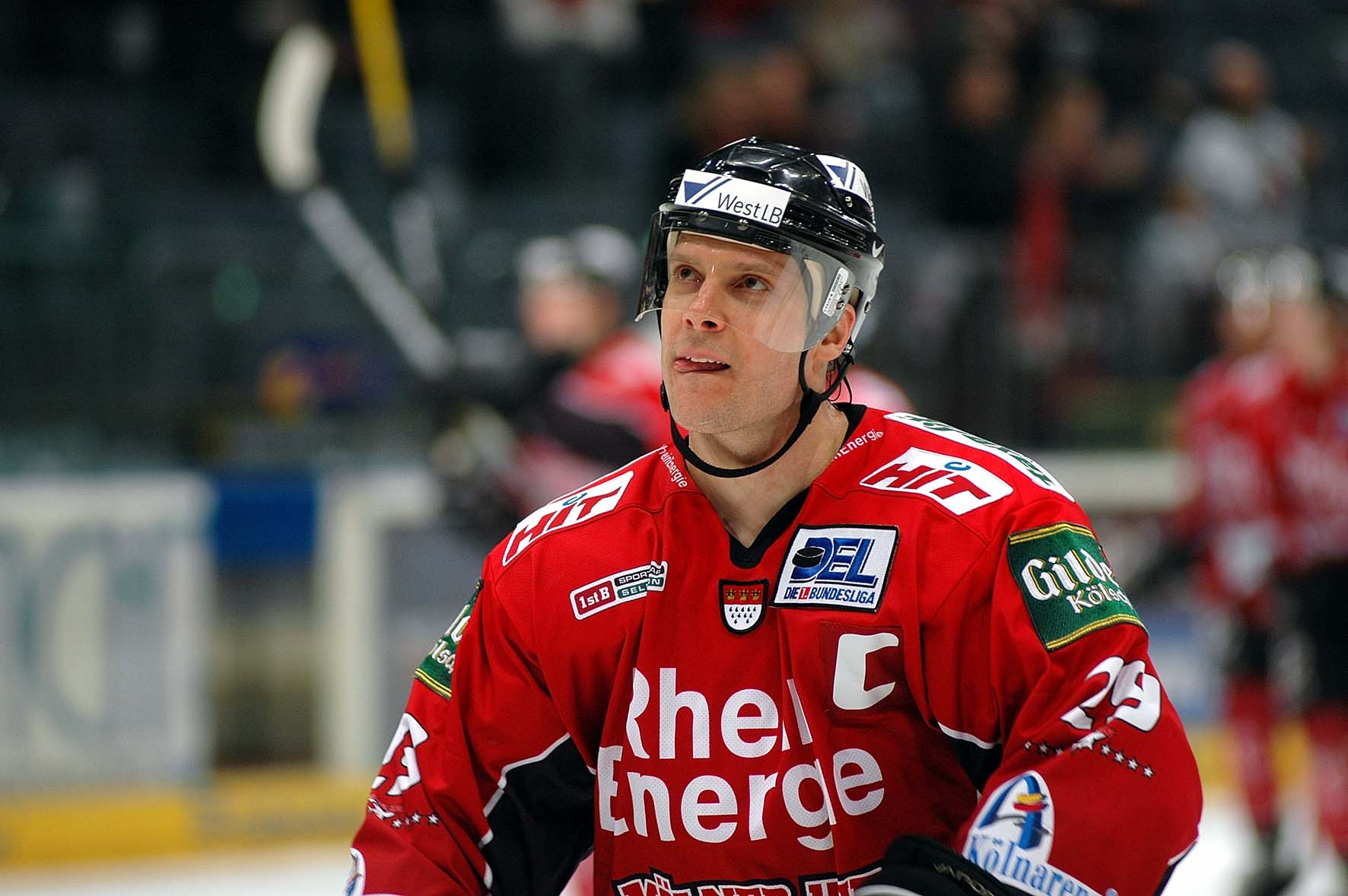
- Born: July 22, 1968 (age 57); Kitchener, Ontario, Canada
- Height: 5 ft 10 in (178 cm)
- Weight: 188 lb (85 kg; 13 st 6 lb)
- Position: Defence
- Shot: Right
- Played for: Washington Capitals; Calgary Flames; EC VSV; EC Hannover; SERC Wild Wings; Kölner Haie; Hannover Scorpions
- National team: Canada
- NHL draft: 144th overall, 1988; Washington Capitals
- Playing career: 1988–2007

Brad Schlegel
Medal record

Men's ice hockey

Representing Canada

Olympic Games
Silver medal – second place	1992 Albertville	Ice Hockey
Silver medal – second place	1994 Lillehammer	Ice Hockey

World Championships
Bronze medal – third place	1995 Sweden	Ice hockey

Bradley Wilfred Schlegel (born July 22, 1968) is a Canadian former ice hockey defenceman.

Schlegel was born in Kitchener, Ontario. Drafted in 1988 by the Washington Capitals, he also played briefly for the Calgary Flames. Schlegel also played for the Canadian National Team for many years, and was part of the Canadian Men's Hockey Teams that played in the 1992 and 1994 Winter Olympic Games, and won the Silver Medal both times.

In 1995, Schlegel began playing professional hockey in Austria and Germany.

He is a graduate of Rockway Mennonite Collegiate in Kitchener, Ontario.

== Career statistics ==
=== Regular season and playoffs ===
			Regular season					Playoffs
Season	Team	League	GP	G	A	Pts	PIM	GP	G	A	Pts	PIM
1984–85	Kitchener Dutchmen	MWJHL	40	30	50	80	70	—	—	—	—	—
1985–86	London Knights	OHL	67	2	13	15	39	5	0	0	0	4
1986–87	London Knights	OHL	65	4	23	27	24	—	—	—	—	—
1987–88	London Knights	OHL	66	13	63	76	49	12	8	17	25	6
1988–89	Canada	Intl	60	2	22	24	30	—	—	—	—	—
1989–90	Canada	Intl	72	7	25	32	44	—	—	—	—	—
1990–91	Canada	Intl	59	8	20	28	64	—	—	—	—	—
1991–92	Canada	Intl	61	3	18	21	84	—	—	—	—	—
1991–92	Washington Capitals	NHL	15	0	1	1	0	7	0	1	1	2
1991–92	Baltimore Skipjacks	AHL	2	0	1	1	0	—	—	—	—	—
1992–93	Washington Capitals	NHL	7	0	1	1	6	—	—	—	—	—
1992–93	Baltimore Skipjacks	AHL	61	3	20	23	40	7	0	5	5	6
1993–94	Calgary Flames	NHL	26	1	6	7	4	—	—	—	—	—
1993–94	Saint John Flames	AHL	21	2	8	10	6	7	0	1	1	6
1993–94	Canada	Intl	12	0	0	0	8	—	—	—	—	—
1994–95	EC VSV	AUT	28	7	26	33	40	12	1	11	12	44
1994–95	Canada	Intl	4	0	1	1	2	—	—	—	—	—
1995–96	EC VSV	Alpen	24	5	18	23	18	—	—	—	—	—
1995–96	EC Hannover	DEL	26	1	16	17	34	—	—	—	—	—
1996–97	EC VSV	Alpen	49	3	29	32	103	—	—	—	—	—
1997–98	EC VSV	Alpen	19	5	14	19	32	—	—	—	—	—
1997–98	EC VSV	AUT	19	1	13	14	10	5	1	3	4	4
1998–99	EC VSV	Alpen	32	7	20	27	18	—	—	—	—	—
1998–99	EC VSV	AUT	23	1	8	9	34	—	—	—	—	—
1999–2000	EC VSV	IEHL	31	3	8	11	63	—	—	—	—	—
1999–2000	EC VSV	AUT	15	0	4	4	12	—	—	—	—	—
2000–01	SERC Wild Wings	DEL	56	12	16	28	62	—	—	—	—	—
2000–01	EC VSV	AUT	3	0	1	1	4	—	—	—	—	—
2001–02	Kölner Haie	DEL	60	6	13	19	54	13	0	0	0	14
2002–03	Kölner Haie	DEL	48	9	28	37	67	15	2	10	12	16
2003–04	Kölner Haie	DEL	52	12	35	47	74	6	0	1	1	4
2004–05	Kölner Haie	DEL	13	2	8	10	12	—	—	—	—	—
2005–06	Kölner Haie	DEL	51	6	28	34	112	9	2	7	9	12
2006–07	Hannover Scorpions	DEL	51	7	14	21	93	6	1	2	3	2
NHL totals			48	1	8	9	10	7	0	1	1	2
DEL totals			372	58	167	225	522	49	5	20	25	48
Alpen totals			124	20	81	101	171	—	—	—	—	—

=== International ===
Year	Team	Event	GP	G	A	Pts	PIM
1991	Canada	WC	10	0	1	1	6
1992	Canada	OG	8	1	2	3	4
1992	Canada	WC	3	0	0	0	2
1994	Canada	OG	8	0	0	0	6
1995	Canada	WC	8	0	3	3	12
2002	Canada	WC	7	1	0	1	4
Senior totals			44	2	6	8	34
