= Andreas Pusnik =

Austrian ice hockey player

Personal information
- Nationality: Austrian
- Born: 7 September 1972 (age 53) Klagenfurt, Austria

Sport
- Sport: Ice hockey

Andreas Pusnik (born 7 September 1972) is an Austrian ice hockey player. He competed in the men's tournaments at the 1994 Winter Olympics and the 1998 Winter Olympics.

== Career statistics ==
=== Regular season and playoffs ===
			Regular season					Playoffs
Season	Team	League	GP	G	A	Pts	PIM	GP	G	A	Pts	PIM
1988–89	EC KAC	AUT	27	9	5	14		—	—	—	—	—
1989–90	EC KAC	AUT	37	15	13	28	26	—	—	—	—	—
1990–91	EC KAC	AUT	37	19	16	35	28	—	—	—	—	—
1991–92	EC KAC	AUT	44	24	29	53	52	—	—	—	—	—
1992–93	EC KAC	AUT	42	20	17	37		—	—	—	—	—
1993–94	EC KAC	AUT	49	26	36	62		—	—	—	—	—
1994–95	EC KAC	AUT	35	25	35	60		—	—	—	—	—
1995–96	EC KAC	AUT	23	14	22	36	20	—	—	—	—	—
1996–97	EC KAC	AUT	51	21	36	57	56	—	—	—	—	—
1997–98	EC VSV	AUT	41	11	28	39	24	—	—	—	—	—
1998–99	EC VSV	AUT	55	17	33	50	56	—	—	—	—	—
1999–2000	EC VSV	IEHL	33	11	21	32	24	—	—	—	—	—
1999–2000	EC VSV	AUT	12	3	8	11	22	—	—	—	—	—
2000–01	EC VSV	AUT	43	24	57	81	50	—	—	—	—	—
2001–02	EC VSV	AUT	32	10	28	38	42	16	4	18	22	20
2002–03	HC TWK Innsbruck	AUT	42	16	44	60	58	7	2	12	14	8
2003–04	HC TWK Innsbruck	AUT	28	5	15	20	24	—	—	—	—	—
2004–05	HC TWK Innsbruck	AUT	45	15	35	50	46	5	3	1	4	22
2005–06	HC TWK Innsbruck	AUT	46	14	26	40	89	7	0	4	4	8
2006–07	EC KAC	AUT	13	1	3	4	22	—	—	—	—	—
AUT totals			702	289	486	775	615	35	9	35	44	58

=== International ===
Year	Team	Event	GP	G	A	Pts	PIM
1988	Austria	EJC B
1989	Austria	EJC B	5	5	3	8	2
1990	Austria	WC B	7	0	2	2	0
1991	Austria	WC B	7	1	2	3	2
1992	Austria	WC B	7	4	14	18	2
1993	Austria	WC	6	1	2	3	2
1994	Austria	OG	7	2	0	2	2
1994	Austria	WC	6	0	3	3	2
1995	Austria	WC	7	3	1	4	10
1997	Austria	WC B	7	0	1	1	2
1998	Austria	OG	4	2	2	4	6
1998	Austria	WC	3	1	0	1	0
1999	Austria	WC	6	3	3	6	2
2001	Austria	WC	4	0	1	1	2
Senior totals			71	17	31	48	32

"Andreas Pusnik". Elite Prospects.
