= Dmitri Kvartalnov =

Soviet ice hockey player (born 1966)

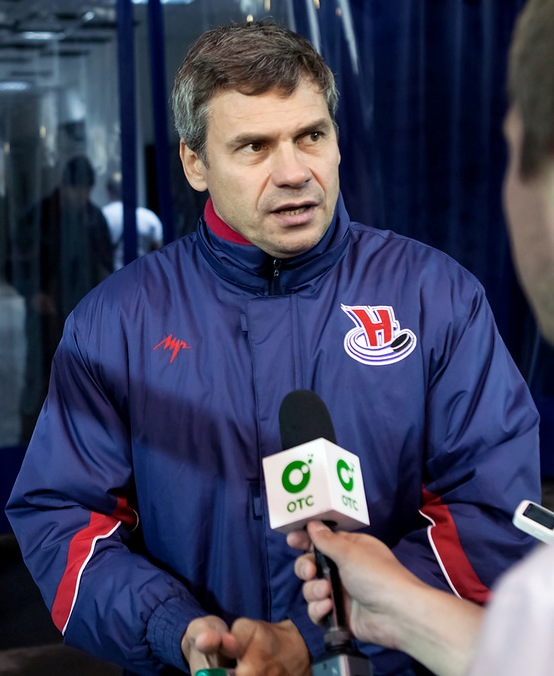
- Born: March 25, 1966 (age 59) Voskresensk, Russian SFSR, Soviet Union
- Height: 5 ft 11 in (180 cm)
- Weight: 180 lb (82 kg; 12 st 12 lb)
- Position: Left wing
- Shot: Left
- Played for: Khimik Voskresensk; San Diego Gulls; Boston Bruins; Providence Bruins; HC Ambri-Piotta; EC KAC; Adler Mannheim; Jokerit; Ak Bars Kazan; Severstal Cherepovets; Krylya Sovetov Moscow
- Current KHL coach: Dinamo Minsk; Belarus
- Coached for: Severstal Cherepovets; Sibir Novosibirsk; CSKA Moscow; Lokomotiv Yaroslavl; Ak Bars Kazan
- National team: Soviet Union and Russia
- NHL draft: 16th overall, 1992; Boston Bruins
- Playing career: 1982–2008
- Coaching career: 2009–present

Dmitri Vyacheslavovich Kvartalnov (Дмитрий Вячеславович Квартальнов; born March 25, 1966, in Voskresensk, Soviet Union) is a retired professional ice hockey player who played 112 games in the National Hockey League, all with the Boston Bruins. He had at least a point in his first 14 NHL games, which stands as the NHL record for longest point streak from the beginning of a career, tied with Joe Malone. This streak lasted from October 8 to November 12, 1992, during which time he scored 12 goals and 10 assists.

== Playing career ==
Kvartalnov had a career which lasted for 25 years, during which he played in North America for the San Diego Gulls of the IHL, the Boston Bruins of the NHL and its minor league affiliate, the Providence Bruins. Kvartalnov's career in Europe consisted of Adler Mannheim in Germany, Jokerit in Finland, HC Ambri-Piotta in Switzerland, Klagenfurter AC in Austria, and teams like Khimik Voskresensk and Ak Bars Kazan in Russia. Kvartalnov retired from play in 2008.

== Coaching career ==
He had been coaching Severstal Cherepovets in 2009–2012, HC Sibir Novosibirsk in 2012–2014, HC CSKA Moscow in 2014–2017 (Gagarin Cup semifinal in 2015 and final in 2016), Lokomotiv Yaroslavl (2017–2019) and Ak Bars Kazan (2019–2022).

== Awards and achievements ==
- 1989–90: Soviet Championship League most points
- 1991–92: James Gatschene Memorial Trophy
- 1991–92: Leo Lamoureux Memorial Trophy
- 1991–92: Gary F. Longman Memorial Trophy
- 1995–96: NDA most assists (38)
- 1999–2000: SM-liiga silver medal

== Career statistics ==
=== Regular season and playoffs ===
			Regular season					Playoffs
Season	Team	League	GP	G	A	Pts	PIM	GP	G	A	Pts	PIM
1982–83	Khimik Voskresensk	URS	7	0	0	0	0	—	—	—	—	—
1983–84	Khimik Voskresensk	URS	2	0	0	0	0	—	—	—	—	—
1984–85	Avtomobilist Sverdlovsk	URS–3	—	7	—	—	—	—	—	—	—	—
1985–86	SKA MVO Kalinin	URS–2	64	33	14	47	42	—	—	—	—	—
1986–87	Khimik Voskresensk	URS	40	11	6	17	28	—	—	—	—	—
1987–88	Khimik Voskresensk	URS	43	16	11	27	16	—	—	—	—	—
1988–89	Khimik Voskresensk	URS	44	20	12	32	18	—	—	—	—	—
1989–90	Khimik Voskresensk	URS	46	25	29	54	33	—	—	—	—	—
1990–91	Khimik Voskresensk	URS	42	12	10	22	18	—	—	—	—	—
1991–92	San Diego Gulls	IHL	77	60	58	118	16	4	2	0	2	2
1992–93	Khimik Voskresensk	RUS	3	0	0	0	0	—	—	—	—	—
1992–93	Boston Bruins	NHL	73	30	42	72	16	4	0	0	0	0
1993–94	Boston Bruins	NHL	39	12	7	19	10	—	—	—	—	—
1993–94	Providence Bruins	AHL	23	13	13	26	8	—	—	—	—	—
1994–95	HC Ambrì–Piotta	NDA	27	24	18	42	30	3	2	0	2	2
1995–96	HC Ambrì–Piotta	NDA	31	22	38	60	36	7	6	7	13	10
1996–97	HC Ambrì–Piotta	NDA	44	30	32	62	30	—	—	—	—	—
1996–97	EC KAC	AUT	—	—	—	—	—	12	10	9	19	6
1997–98	EC KAC	Alps	21	18	19	37	6	—	—	—	—	—
1997–98	EC KAC	AUT	24	16	19	35	47	—	—	—	—	—
1998–99	EC KAC	AUT	22	16	18	34	4	—	—	—	—	—
1998–99	EC KAC	Alps	32	24	21	55	18	—	—	—	—	—
1999–00	Adler Mannheim	DEL	15	4	4	8	10	—	—	—	—	—
1999–00	Jokerit	SM-l	27	9	8	17	10	11	4	4	8	4
2000–01	Ak Bars Kazan	RSL	32	18	17	35	41	4	1	3	4	0
2001–02	Ak Bars Kazan	RSL	50	16	26	42	32	11	2	5	7	10
2002–03	Ak Bars Kazan	RSL	44	12	16	28	14	2	0	1	1	2
2003–04	Ak Bars Kazan	RSL	43	12	14	26	12	5	0	3	3	2
2004–05	Severstal Cherepovets	RSL	29	7	8	15	6	—	—	—	—	—
2004–05	Khimik Voskresensk	RSL	6	0	1	1	2	—	—	—	—	—
2005–06	Krylya Sovetov Moscow	RUS–2	44	15	16	31	40	17	4	3	7	14
2006–07	Krylya Sovetov Moscow	RSL	25	9	13	22	26	—	—	—	—	—
2006–07	Severstal Cherepovets	RSL	20	3	6	9	0	3	0	0	0	2
2007–08	Khimik Voskresensk	RUS–2	4	1	2	3	16	—	—	—	—	—
URS totals			224	84	68	152	113	—	—	—	—	—
NHL totals			112	42	49	91	26	4	0	0	0	0
RSL totals			249	77	101	178	139	25	3	12	15	16

=== International ===
Year	Team	Event	Place	GP	G	A	Pts	PIM
1989	Soviet Union	WC	1st place, gold medalist(s)	10	3	3	6	6
1991	Soviet Union	WC	3rd place, bronze medalist(s)	7	0	1	1	0
1996	Russia	WC	4th	8	4	4	8	4
Senior totals				25	7	8	15	10

Sporting positions
Preceded by Glen Murray	Boston Bruins first-round draft pick 1992	Succeeded by Kevyn Adams
Awards
Preceded by Sergei Makarov	Soviet scoring champion 1990	Succeeded by Roman Oksiuta
