= Tony Iob =

Italian ice hockey player (b. 1971)

- Born: 2 January 1971 (age 55) Renfrew, Ontario, Canada
- Height: 6 ft 0 in (183 cm)
- Weight: 205 lb (93 kg; 14 st 9 lb)
- Position: Forward
- Shot: Left
- Played for: Rochester Americans; Erie Panthers; HC Devils Milano; HC Milano Saima; Kölner Haie; HC Asiago; Wiener EV; Phoenix Mustangs; HC Bolzano; WSV Sterzing Broncos; San Diego Gulls; Klagenfurter AC; VEU Feldkirch; EHC Visp; Graz 99ers HC Alleghe
- National team: Italy
- NHL draft: 189th overall, 1991; Buffalo Sabres
- Playing career: 1991–2009

Tony Iob (born 2 January 1971) is an Italian ice hockey player. He competed in the men's tournament at the 2006 Winter Olympics.

== Career statistics ==
=== Regular season and playoffs ===
			Regular season					Playoffs
Season	Team	League	GP	G	A	Pts	PIM	GP	G	A	Pts	PIM
1987–88	Renfrew Timberwolves	EOJHL	20	20	14	34	36	—	—	—	—	—
1987–88	Pembroke Lumber Kings	CJHL	34	3	3	6	22	—	—	—	—	—
1988–89	Kingston Raiders	OHL	49	7	11	18	78	—	—	—	—	—
1989–90	Kingston Frontenacs	OHL	62	23	35	58	142	7	2	0	2	21
1990–91	Kingston Frontenacs	OHL	33	20	24	44	133	—	—	—	—	—
1990–91	Sault Ste. Marie Greyhounds	OHL	24	18	11	29	52	14	14	7	21	44
1991–92	Sault Ste. Marie Greyhounds	OHL	42	28	34	62	157	19	17	17	34	45
1991–92	Rochester Americans	AHL	1	0	0	0	0	—	—	—	—	—
1992–93	Erie Panthers	ECHL	25	14	13	27	194	5	2	2	4	45
1992–93	Rochester Americans	AHL	20	12	8	20	70	7	1	1	2	14
1993–94	HC Devils Milano	ITA	26	21	10	31	64	—	—	—	—	—
1993–94	HC Devils Milano	AL	—	—	—	—	—	—	—	—	—	—
1994–95	HC Devils Milano	ITA	28	26	24	50	69	1	0	2	2	2
1994–95	HC Devils Milano	AL	6	16	7	23	20	—	—	—	—	—
1995–96	HC 24 Milan	ITA	30	31	18	49	86	13	9	14	23	30
1995–96	HC 24 Milan	AL	6	9	4	13	55	—	—	—	—	—
1996–97	HC 24 Milan	ITA	24	12	13	25	121	—	—	—	—	—
1996–97	Kölner Haie	DEL	13	6	6	12	43	3	0	2	2	27
1997–98	Kölner Haie	DEL	44	2	4	6	81	3	0	0	0	2
1998–99	HC Asiago	ITA	12	9	10	19	74	3	1	0	1	16
1998–99	HC Asiago	AL	27	20	31	51	67	—	—	—	—	—
1999–2000	Wiener EV	IEHL	30	23	32	55	68	—	—	—	—	—
1999–2000	Wiener EV	AUT	11	9	10	19	34	—	—	—	—	—
1999–2000	Phoenix Mustangs	WCHL	8	13	5	18	10	10	8	9	17	54
2000–01	HC Bolzano	ITA	26	27	22	49	40	13	13	13	26	18
2001–02	Wipptal Broncos	ITA	42	30	48	78	62	2	0	1	1	0
2001–02	San Diego Gulls	WCHL	6	4	2	6	6	7	2	2	4	10
2002–03	EC KAC	AUT	40	18	26	44	118	6	2	1	3	22
2003–04	EC KAC	AUT	47	29	35	64	74	8	9	3	12	10
2004–05	EC KAC	AUT	45	28	23	51	88	12	8	6	14	45
2005–06	EC KAC	AUT	41	24	35	59	84	—	—	—	—	—
2005–06	VEU Feldkirch	AUT.2	5	7	2	9	10	—	—	—	—	—
2006–07	EC KAC	AUT	36	18	21	39	78	—	—	—	—	—
2006–07	EHC Visp	SUI.2	—	—	—	—	—	8	6	4	10	16
2007–08	Graz99ers	AUT	40	13	18	31	87	—	—	—	—	—
2007–08	Alleghe Hockey	ITA	9	1	9	10	10	4	1	0	1	12
2008–09	Graz99ers	AUT	53	18	26	44	60	7	3	1	4	22
ITA totals			197	157	154	311	526	36	24	30	54	78
AUT totals			313	157	194	351	623	33	22	11	33	99

=== International ===
Year	Team	Event	GP	G	A	Pts	PIM
1997	Italy	WC	8	1	2	3	10
1998	Italy	WC	6	1	1	2	16
1999	Italy	WC Q	3	1	0	1	0
2000	Italy	OGQ	3	2	3	5	0
2001	Italy	WC	6	1	0	1	31
2003	Italy	WC D1	5	3	2	5	8
2006	Italy	OG	5	2	2	4	2
2006	Italy	WC	3	1	0	1	18
Senior totals			39	12	10	22	85
