= Gord Donnelly =

Canadian ice hockey player and scout

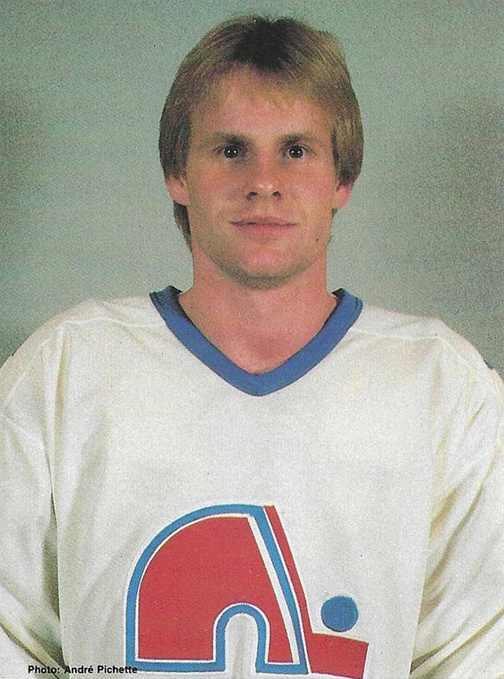
- Donnelly in 1985 photo
- Born: April 5, 1962 (age 64) Montreal, Quebec, Canada
- Height: 6 ft 1 in (185 cm)
- Weight: 202 lb (92 kg; 14 st 6 lb)
- Position: Defence
- Shot: Right
- Played for: Quebec Nordiques; Winnipeg Jets; Buffalo Sabres; Dallas Stars
- NHL draft: 62nd overall, 1981; St. Louis Blues
- Playing career: 1982–2000

Gord Donnelly (born April 5, 1962) is a Canadian former professional ice hockey defenceman.

Donnelly was born in Montreal and wound up playing 554 games in the National Hockey League, playing with four teams from 1983 to 1995 before closing his hockey career with the EC VSV. When his NHL career ended in 1995, he was one of only 24 players with 2,000 penalty minutes.

== Career statistics ==
			Regular season					Playoffs
Season	Team	League	GP	G	A	Pts	PIM	GP	G	A	Pts	PIM
1978–79	Laval National	QMJHL	71	1	14	15	79	—	—	—	—	—
1979–80	Laval Voisins	QMJHL	44	5	10	15	47	—	—	—	—	—
1979–80	Chicoutimi Saguenéens	QMJHL	24	1	5	6	64	12	0	0	0	12
1980–81	Sherbrooke Castors	QMJHL	67	15	23	38	247	14	1	2	3	35
1981–82	Sherbrooke Castors	QMJHL	60	8	41	49	240	22	2	7	9	106
1981–82	Sherbrooke Castors	MC	—	—	—	—	—	5	0	1	1	14
1982–83	Salt Lake Golden Eagles	CHL	67	3	12	15	222	6	1	1	2	8
1983–84	Quebec Nordiques	NHL	38	0	5	5	60	—	—	—	—	—
1983–84	Fredericton Express	AHL	30	2	3	5	146	7	1	1	2	43
1984–85	Quebec Nordiques	NHL	22	0	0	0	33	—	—	—	—	—
1984–85	Fredericton Express	AHL	42	1	5	6	134	6	0	1	1	25
1985–86	Quebec Nordiques	NHL	36	2	2	4	85	1	0	0	0	0
1985–86	Fredericton Express	AHL	38	3	5	8	103	5	0	0	0	33
1986–87	Quebec Nordiques	NHL	38	0	2	2	143	13	0	0	0	53
1987–88	Quebec Nordiques	NHL	63	4	3	7	301	—	—	—	—	—
1988–89	Quebec Nordiques	NHL	16	4	0	4	46	—	—	—	—	—
1988–89	Winnipeg Jets	NHL	57	6	10	16	228	—	—	—	—	—
1989–90	Winnipeg Jets	NHL	55	3	3	6	222	6	0	1	1	8
1990–91	Winnipeg Jets	NHL	57	3	4	7	265	—	—	—	—	—
1991–92	Winnipeg Jets	NHL	4	0	0	0	11	—	—	—	—	—
1991–92	Buffalo Sabres	NHL	67	2	3	5	305	6	0	1	1	0
1992–93	Buffalo Sabres	NHL	60	3	8	11	221	—	—	—	—	—
1993–94	Buffalo Sabres	NHL	7	0	0	0	31	—	—	—	—	—
1993–94	Dallas Stars	NHL	18	0	1	1	66	—	—	—	—	—
1994–95	Kalamazoo Wings	IHL	7	2	2	4	18	—	—	—	—	—
1994–95	Dallas Stars	NHL	16	1	0	1	52	—	—	—	—	—
1995–96	Houston Aeros	IHL	73	3	4	7	333	—	—	—	—	—
1996–97	Houston Aeros	IHL	5	0	0	0	25	—	—	—	—	—
1996–97	Chicago Wolves	IHL	59	3	5	8	144	4	0	2	2	28
1997–98	EC VSV	Alp	12	0	5	5	28	—	—	—	—	—
1997–98	EC VSV	AUT	19	6	8	14	61	5	0	0	0	42
1998–99	EC VSV	Alp	31	2	8	10	148	—	—	—	—	—
1998–99	EC VSV	AUT	23	1	1	2	44	—	—	—	—	—
1999–2000	EC VSV	IEHL	32	3	6	9	106	—	—	—	—	—
1999–2000	EC VSV	AUT	15	0	1	1	63	—	—	—	—	—
NHL totals			554	28	41	69	2,069	26	0	2	2	61

== See also ==
- List of NHL players with 2,000 career penalty minutes
