= Normand Krumpschmid =

Austrian ice hockey player

- Born: 13 December 1969 (age 55); Sudbury, Ontario, Canada
- Height: 5 ft 11 in (180 cm)
- Weight: 190 lb (86 kg; 13 st 8 lb)
- Position: Centre
- Shot: Left
- Played for: EK Zell am See; EC Graz; VEU Feldkirch; Wiener EV
- National team: Austria
- NHL draft: 1990 NHL Supplemental Draft; Vancouver Canucks
- Playing career: 1992–2004

Normand Krumpschmid (born 13 December 1969) is a Canadian-born Austrian ice hockey player. He competed in the men's tournament at the 1998 Winter Olympics.

== Career statistics ==
=== Regular season and playoffs ===
			Regular season					Playoffs
Season	Team	League	GP	G	A	Pts	PIM	GP	G	A	Pts	PIM
1985–86	Sudbury Nickel Capital Wolves	GNML
1985–86	Sudbury Wolves	OHL	1	0	0	0	0	—	—	—	—	—
1986–87	Sudbury Burgess Power Trains	GNML
1986–87	Sudbury Wolves	OHL	5	0	0	0	0	—	—	—	—	—
1987–88	St. Thomas Stars	WOHL	40	20	25	45	147	—	—	—	—	—
1988–89	Ferris State University	CCHA	35	5	7	12	40	—	—	—	—	—
1989–90	Ferris State University	CCHA	36	6	14	20	22	—	—	—	—	—
1990–91	Ferris State University	CCHA	40	8	22	30	16	—	—	—	—	—
1991–92	Ferris State University	CCHA	37	11	18	29	26	—	—	—	—	—
1992–93	EK Zell am See	AUT	52	16	18	34	117	—	—	—	—	—
1993–94	EC Graz	AUT	57	14	20	34	81	—	—	—	—	—
1994–95	Muskegon Fury	CoHL	59	22	27	49	27	17	4	4	8	8
1995–96	VEU Feldkirch	AUT	34	12	13	25	71	—	—	—	—	—
1996–97	VEU Feldkirch	AUT	55	9	20	29	44	—	—	—	—	—
1997–98	Wiener EV	AUT	39	16	21	37	127	—	—	—	—	—
1998–99	Wiener EV	AUT	48	12	25	37	74	—	—	—	—	—
1999–2000	Manchester Storm	GBR	40	11	13	24	56	6	0	4	4	2
2003–04	Rockford IceHogs	UHL	4	1	0	1	0	—	—	—	—	—
AUT totals			285	79	117	196	514	—	—	—	—	—

=== International ===
Year	Team	Event	GP	G	A	Pts	PIM
1997	Austria	OGQ	4	0	0	0	0
1998	Austria	OG	4	0	0	0	2
1998	Austria	WC	3	0	0	0	0
1999	Austria	WC	6	2	0	2	16
Senior totals			17	2	0	2	18

"Normand Krumpschmid". Elite Prospects.
