= Brent Gretzky =

Canadian ice hockey centre (born 1972)

- Born: February 20, 1972 (age 54) Brantford, Ontario, Canada
- Height: 5 ft 11 in (180 cm)
- Weight: 170 lb (77 kg; 12 st 2 lb)
- Position: Centre
- Shot: Left
- Played for: Tampa Bay Lightning; EC Graz
- NHL draft: 49th overall, 1992; Tampa Bay Lightning
- Playing career: 1992–2008

Brent Gretzky (born February 20, 1972) is a Canadian former professional ice hockey player who briefly played in the National Hockey League (NHL) for the Tampa Bay Lightning. He is the brother of Wayne and Keith Gretzky.

== Playing career ==
Gretzky was taught the game by his father Walter. In his youth, he played in the 1985 and 1986 Quebec International Pee-Wee Hockey Tournaments with a minor ice hockey team from Brantford.

Gretzky grew up playing minor hockey in Brantford, Ontario for the Brantford Classics of the OMHA. In 1988–89, he played Jr. B hockey for the Brantford Classics of the Mid-Western Junior B Hockey League. He was selected in the 1st round (6th overall) of the 1989 OHL Priority Selection by the Belleville Bulls where he spent three years With the Bulls, he was a linemate of future NHL player Darren McCarty. Gretzky was drafted by the expansion Tampa Bay Lightning in the 1992 NHL entry draft, but did not find the same success as his brother Wayne.

During Gretzky's 13-game tenure with Tampa Bay, he played once against brother Wayne: "We must have faced off 15 times and I won one. I remember chasing him behind the net. I knew what he was going to do and I still found myself looking for my jock. The hardest part was after the game, going and watching ESPN. It was older Gretzky shows young Gretzky how to play hockey."

Together, Wayne and Brent hold the NHL record for most combined points by two brothers – 2,857 for Wayne and 4 for Brent, and are second overall in points scored by any number of brothers (behind the six brothers of the Sutter family who combined for 2,934 NHL points – 73 more than Wayne and Brent, although the Gretzkys' combined totals are greater than any five of the six Sutters.)

Gretzky's selection by an expansion team in an era when established teams were only obliged to leave the bottom echelon of their players unprotected in expansion drafts has led to speculation that he might have never made it onto an NHL roster if he had been drafted by an established team. Other than his brief stint in Tampa Bay, Gretzky was a career minor leaguer, floating between the International Hockey League, the American Hockey League, and the United Hockey League. He played for EC Graz Austria in 1997–98. On June 6, 2006, the Elmira Jackals announced they had acquired his rights from the Motor City Mechanics, but he never played with Elmira; his season with the Mechanics was his last as a professional. He and four other former Danbury Trashers players were served with subpoenas by the FBI in its investigation into owner James Galante's business dealings.

In 2008, Gretzky played six games for his hometown Brantford Blast team in the senior league Major League Hockey, which went on to win the 2008 Allan Cup, after which Gretzky retired from organized competition. He now serves as a police officer with the Ontario Provincial Police.

== Career statistics ==
=== Regular season and playoffs ===
			Regular season					Playoffs
Season	Team	League	GP	G	A	Pts	PIM	GP	G	A	Pts	PIM
1987–88	Brantford Classics AAA	Midget	40	49	70	119	—	—	—	—	—	—
1987–88	Brantford Classics	MWJHL	14	4	11	15	2	—	—	—	—	—
1988–89	Brantford Classics	MWJHL	40	29	47	76	57	—	—	—	—	—
1989–90	Belleville Bulls	OHL	66	15	32	47	30	11	0	0	0	2
1990–91	Belleville Bulls	OHL	66	26	56	82	25	6	3	3	6	2
1991–92	Belleville Bulls	OHL	62	43	78	121	37	—	—	—	—	—
1992–93	Atlanta Knights	IHL	77	20	34	54	84	9	3	2	5	8
1993–94	Atlanta Knights	IHL	54	17	23	40	30	14	1	1	2	2
1993–94	Tampa Bay Lightning	NHL	10	1	2	3	2	—	—	—	—	—
1994–95	Atlanta Knights	IHL	67	19	32	51	42	5	4	1	5	4
1994–95	Tampa Bay Lightning	NHL	3	0	1	1	0	—	—	—	—	—
1995–96	St. John's Maple Leafs	AHL	68	13	28	41	40	4	0	6	6	0
1996–97	Pensacola Ice Pilots	ECHL	22	9	15	24	4	12	5	8	13	4
1996–97	Las Vegas Thunder	IHL	40	5	12	17	8	—	—	—	—	—
1996–97	Quebec Rafales	IHL	1	0	0	0	0	—	—	—	—	—
1997–98	EC Graz	AL	16	6	24	30	28	3	2	3	5	0
1997–98	EC Graz	AUT	18	11	16	27	8	—	—	—	—	—
1998–99	Hershey Bears	AHL	6	2	2	4	2	—	—	—	—	—
1998–99	Chicago Wolves	IHL	39	9	19	28	15	3	0	1	1	0
1998–99	Asheville Smoke	UHL	32	28	42	70	29	—	—	—	—	—
1999–00	Chicago Wolves	IHL	2	0	0	0	0	—	—	—	—	—
1999–00	Asheville Smoke	UHL	74	36	92	128	68	2	1	2	3	0
2000–01	Port Huron Border Cats	UHL	9	0	8	8	18	—	—	—	—	—
2000–01	Fort Wayne Komets	UHL	61	16	58	74	22	7	5	3	8	2
2001–02	Fort Wayne Komets	UHL	73	21	55	76	35	—	—	—	—	—
2002–03	Port Huron Beacons	UHL	45	31	29	60	12	3	3	0	3	2
2003–04	Port Huron Beacons	UHL	61	43	38	81	10	9	4	13	17	26
2004–05	Danbury Trashers	UHL	37	13	25	38	8	—	—	—	—	—
2005–06	Motor City Mechanics	UHL	66	15	65	80	12	4	1	1	2	0
2005–06	Belleville Macs	EOSHL	23	11	15	26	25	4	2	2	4	18
2006–07	Marmora Lakers	EOSHL	18	7	23	30	8	5	4	4	8	2
2007–08	Brantford Blast	MLH	2	0	0	0	2	4	1	0	1	4
2007–08	Marmora Lakers	EOSHL	1	0	0	0	0	—	—	—	—	—
2007–08	Brantford Blast	AC	—	—	—	—	—	5	1	4	5	2
IHL totals			280	70	120	190	179	31	8	5	13	14
UHL totals			458	203	412	615	214	25	14	19	33	30
NHL totals			13	1	3	4	2	—	—	—	—	—

== See also ==
- List of family relations in the National Hockey League
