= Bo Svanberg =

Swedish ice hockey player (born 1967)

- Born: January 5, 1967 (age 59) Hagfors, SWE
- Height: 6 ft 0 in (183 cm)
- Weight: 190 lb (86 kg; 13 st 8 lb)
- Position: Centre
- Shot: Left
- Played for: Färjestad BK; Malmö IF; Kapfenberger SV; Kassel Huskies
- NHL draft: 218th overall, 1985; Detroit Red Wings
- Playing career: 1982–2002

Bo Olof Svanberg (born January 5, 1967) is a Swedish former professional ice hockey player.

== Career ==
During his career he played for Färjestads BK between 1985 and 1988 and won during that period two Swedish Championship in 1986 and 1988. He then signed with Malmö IF and played with them until 1996 and won his third and fourth Swedish Championship with Malmö in 1992 and 1994. In 1996, he signed with Austrian club Kapfenberger SV. But after one year with them he signed with German club Kassel Huskies. He only stayed one year with them also, and then signed once more Malmö IF. After two seasons with Malmö he ended his career in the lower leagues in Sweden. In 1985, he was drafted by the Detroit Red Wings as 218th pick overall, but he never played for the Red Wings.

== Personal life ==
His son Mattias is a professional footballer, playing for the Sweden national team.

== Career statistics ==
			Regular season					Playoffs
Season	Team	League	GP	G	A	Pts	PIM	GP	G	A	Pts	PIM
1982–83	IK Viking	Division 2	20	6	6	12	—	—	—	—	—	—
1983–84	Färjestad BK J18		—	—	—	—	—	—	—	—	—	—
1983–84	Färjestad BK J20	Juniorserien	—	—	—	—	—	—	—	—	—	—
1984–85	Färjestad BK J18	J18 Elit	—	—	—	—	—	—	—	—	—	—
1984–85	Färjestad BK J20	Juniorserien	—	—	—	—	—	—	—	—	—	—
1985–86	Färjestad BK J20	Juniorserien	—	—	—	—	—	—	—	—	—	—
1985–86	Färjestad BK	Elitserien	16	4	2	6	8	8	1	0	1	0
1986–87	Färjestad BK J20	Juniorserien	—	—	—	—	—	—	—	—	—	—
1986–87	Färjestad BK	Elitserien	29	4	3	7	8	7	2	0	2	4
1987–88	Färjestad BK	Elitserien	17	3	3	6	22	3	0	0	0	0
1988–89	Malmö IF	Division 1	30	24	27	51	36	13	1	8	9	22
1989–90	Malmö IF	Division 1	36	20	26	46	24	3	1	2	3	0
1990–91	Malmö IF	Elitserien	36	11	8	19	18	2	0	0	0	0
1991–92	Malmö IF	Elitserien	34	15	12	27	16	10	2	6	8	8
1992–93	Malmö IF	Elitserien	39	11	11	22	32	6	1	1	2	4
1993–94	Malmö IF	Elitserien	39	18	9	27	16	11	2	7	9	8
1994–95	Malmö IF	Elitserien	35	5	10	15	26	9	2	4	6	8
1995–96	Malmö IF	Elitserien	28	4	10	14	12	4	0	0	0	2
1996–97	EC Kapfenberg	Austria	48	24	26	50	59	—	—	—	—	—
1997–98	EC Kapfenberg	Austria	8	2	3	5	—	—	—	—	—	—
1997–98	Kassel Huskies	DEL	33	6	3	9	8	4	1	1	2	8
1998–99	MIF Redhawks	Elitserien	39	7	12	19	49	8	1	1	2	31
1999–00	MIF Redhawks	Elitserien	43	3	3	6	55	4	0	1	1	2
2000–01	Kristianstads IK	Division 1	13	3	14	17	33	—	—	—	—	—
2000–01	Hvidovre IK	Denmark2	7	12	15	27	—	—	—	—	—	—
2001–02	Limhamn HC	Division 1	—	11	18	29	—	—	—	—	—	—
Elitserien totals			355	85	83	168	262	72	11	20	31	67
DEL totals			33	6	3	9	8	4	1	1	2	8
Austria totals			56	26	29	55	59	—	—	—	—	—
