= Darcy Martini =

Canadian ice hockey player

- Born: January 30, 1969 (age 56); Castlegar, British Columbia, Canada
- Height: 6 ft 4 in (193 cm)
- Weight: 220 lb (100 kg; 15 st 10 lb)
- Position: Defence
- Shot: Left
- Played for: Edmonton Oilers
- NHL draft: 162nd overall, 1989; Edmonton Oilers
- Playing career: 1992–2002

Darcy R. Martini (born January 30, 1969) is a Canadian former ice hockey player. He played two NHL games for the Edmonton Oilers.

== Playing career ==
Martini was drafted 162nd overall by Edmonton in 1989 from Michigan Tech. He turned pro in 1992 and split the 1992–93 season in the American Hockey League with the Cape Breton Oilers and the East Coast Hockey League with the Wheeling Thunderbirds. In the 1993–94 NHL season, Martini played two games for Edmonton, it would be the only NHL experience he would receive. After spending the next few seasons bouncing around the minor leagues, Martini moved to Europe in 1996, joining Klagenfurt of the Austrian Hockey League where he spent two seasons. In 1998, he moved to the Deutsche Eishockey Liga in Germany with the Hannover Scorpions before returning to Klagenfurt. He spent his final two seasons in Italy and retired in 2002.

== Career statistics ==
			Regular season					Playoffs
Season	Team	League	GP	G	A	Pts	PIM	GP	G	A	Pts	PIM
1984–85	Castlegar Rebels	KIJHL	38	4	17	21	58	—	—	—	—	—
1985–86	Castlegar Rebels	KIJHL	38	8	28	36	180	—	—	—	—	—
1986–87	Castlegar Rebels	KIJHL	40	12	53	65	260	—	—	—	—	—
1987–88	Vernon Lakers	KIJHL	48	9	26	35	193	12	2	9	11	28
1988–89	Michigan Tech	NCAA	37	1	2	3	107	—	—	—	—	—
1989–90	Michigan Tech	NCAA	36	3	16	19	150	—	—	—	—	—
1990–91	Michigan Tech	NCAA	34	10	13	23	184	—	—	—	—	—
1991–92	Michigan Tech	NCAA	17	5	13	18	58	—	—	—	—	—
1992–93	Cape Breton Oilers	AHL	47	1	6	7	36	2	0	1	1	0
1992–93	Wheeling Thunderbirds	ECHL	6	0	2	2	2	—	—	—	—	—
1993–94	Cape Breton Oilers	AHL	65	18	38	56	131	5	1	3	4	26
1993–94	Edmonton Oilers	NHL	2	0	0	0	0	—	—	—	—	—
1994–95	Cape Breton Oilers	AHL	31	2	13	15	75	—	—	—	—	—
1994–95	Portland Pirates	AHL	22	3	6	9	28	—	—	—	—	—
1994–95	Minnesota Moose	IHL	10	3	1	4	10	1	0	0	0	2
1995–96	Los Angeles Ice Dogs	IHL	49	15	31	46	50	—	—	—	—	—
1995–96	San Francisco Spiders	IHL	17	3	4	7	10	4	0	2	2	2
1996–97	Klagenfurter AC	Austria	54	22	22	44	129	—	—	—	—	—
1997–98	Klagenfurter AC	Austria	45	11	16	27	94	—	—	—	—	—
1998–99	Hannover Scorpions	DEL	49	12	17	29	202	—	—	—	—	—
1999–00	Klagenfurter AC	IEL	29	9	16	25	50	—	—	—	—	—
1999–00	Klagenfurter AC	Austria	15	1	9	10	62	—	—	—	—	—
2000–01	WSV Sterzing Broncos	Italy	27	9	21	30	80	6	3	2	5	8
2001–02	HC Merano	Italy	29	2	10	12	53	—	—	—	—	—
NHL totals			2	0	0	0	0	—	—	—	—	—
AHL totals			165	24	63	87	270	7	1	4	5	26
