= Martin Hohenberger =

Austrian ice hockey player

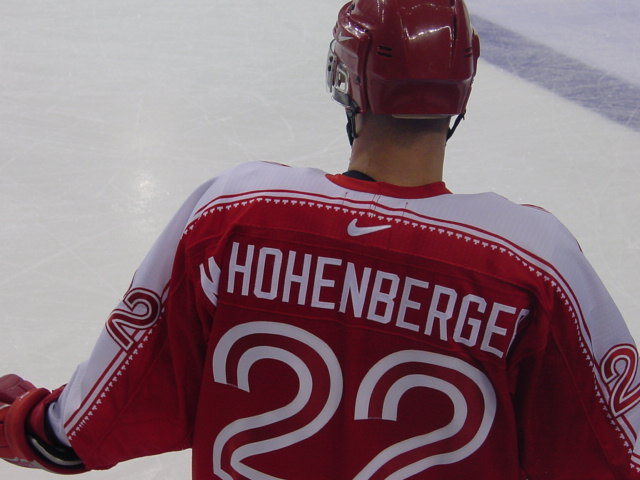
- Born: 29 January 1977 (age 49) Villach, Austria
- Height: 6 ft 1 in (185 cm)
- Weight: 207 lb (94 kg; 14 st 11 lb)
- Position: Left wing
- Shot: Left
- Played for: ATSE Graz; Graz 99ers HC Innsbruck; EHC Linz; DEG Metro Stars; Revier Löwen Oberhausen; Villacher SV
- National team: Austria
- NHL draft: 74th overall, 1995; Montreal Canadiens
- Playing career: 1997–2011

Martin Hohenberger (born 29 January 1977) is an Austrian former ice hockey player. He played the majority of his career in Austria and was selected by the Montreal Canadiens in the 1995 NHL entry draft, though he never played in the NHL. Internationally he played for Austria at several tournaments, including the 1998 Winter Olympics and the 2002 Winter Olympics.

== Career statistics ==
=== Regular season and playoffs ===
			Regular season					Playoffs
Season	Team	League	GP	G	A	Pts	PIM	GP	G	A	Pts	PIM
1993–94	Victoria Cougars	WHL	61	3	13	16	82	—	—	—	—	—
1994–95	Prince George Cougars	WHL	47	10	21	31	81	—	—	—	—	—
1995–96	Prince George Cougars	WHL	37	10	19	29	19	—	—	—	—	—
1995–96	Lethbridge Hurricanes	WHL	20	5	1	6	21	4	0	3	3	4
1996–97	Lethbridge Hurricanes	WHL	57	26	33	59	74	19	7	13	20	15
1997–98	EC VSV	AUT	8	2	3	5	12	—	—	—	—	—
1997–98	Fredericton Canadiens	AHL	9	0	1	1	2	—	—	—	—	—
1997–98	New Orleans Brass	ECHL	9	1	2	3	15	3	0	0	0	0
1998–99	New Orleans Brass	ECHL	57	10	9	19	38	3	0	0	0	2
1999–2000	EC VSV	IEHL	32	2	8	10	137	—	—	—	—	—
1999–2000	EC VSV	AUT	14	8	8	16	32	—	—	—	—	—
2000–01	EC VSV	AUT	46	27	38	65	135	—	—	—	—	—
2001–02	Revierlöwen Oberhausen	DEL	55	9	20	29	38	—	—	—	—	—
2002–03	HC TWK Innsbruck	AUT	40	16	36	52	132	2	1	4	5	16
2003–04	DEG Metro Stars	DEL	21	3	3	6	10	—	—	—	—	—
2003–04	HC TWK Innsbruck	AUT	17	3	6	9	14	—	—	—	—	—
2004–05	HC TWK Innsbruck	AUT	44	16	26	42	58	5	1	2	3	27
2005–06	HC TWK Innsbruck	AUT	47	16	38	54	66	7	5	4	9	37
2006–07	EHC Liwest Black Wings Linz	AUT	54	17	29	46	92	3	1	0	1	2
2007–08	EHC Liwest Black Wings Linz	AUT	42	8	17	25	40	9	0	4	4	6
2008–09	HC TWK Innsbruck	AUT	27	3	9	12	32	2	0	0	0	2
2010–11	ATSE Graz	AUT.2	7	0	0	0	18	—	—	—	—	—
2016–17	ESC Steindorf	AUT.4	—	—	—	—	—	2	0	1	1	2
2017–18	ESC Steindorf	AUT.4	7	8	11	19	37	3	2	2	4	6
AUT totals			339	116	210	326	613	28	8	14	22	90

=== International ===
Year	Team	Event	GP	G	A	Pts	PIM
1994	Austria	EJC B	4	2	0	2	54
1995	Austria	EJC B	5	0	0	0	0
1996	Austria	WJC B	5	2	3	5	10
1998	Austria	OLY	4	0	0	0	2
2000	Austria	WC	6	1	1	2	4
2001	Austria	OLYQ	3	0	0	0	0
2002	Austria	OLY	4	0	0	0	0
2002	Austria	WC	6	0	0	0	10
2003	Austria	WC	6	3	1	4	8
Junior totals			14	4	3	7	64
Senior totals			29	4	2	6	24
