= Tony Amonte =

American ice hockey player (born 1970)

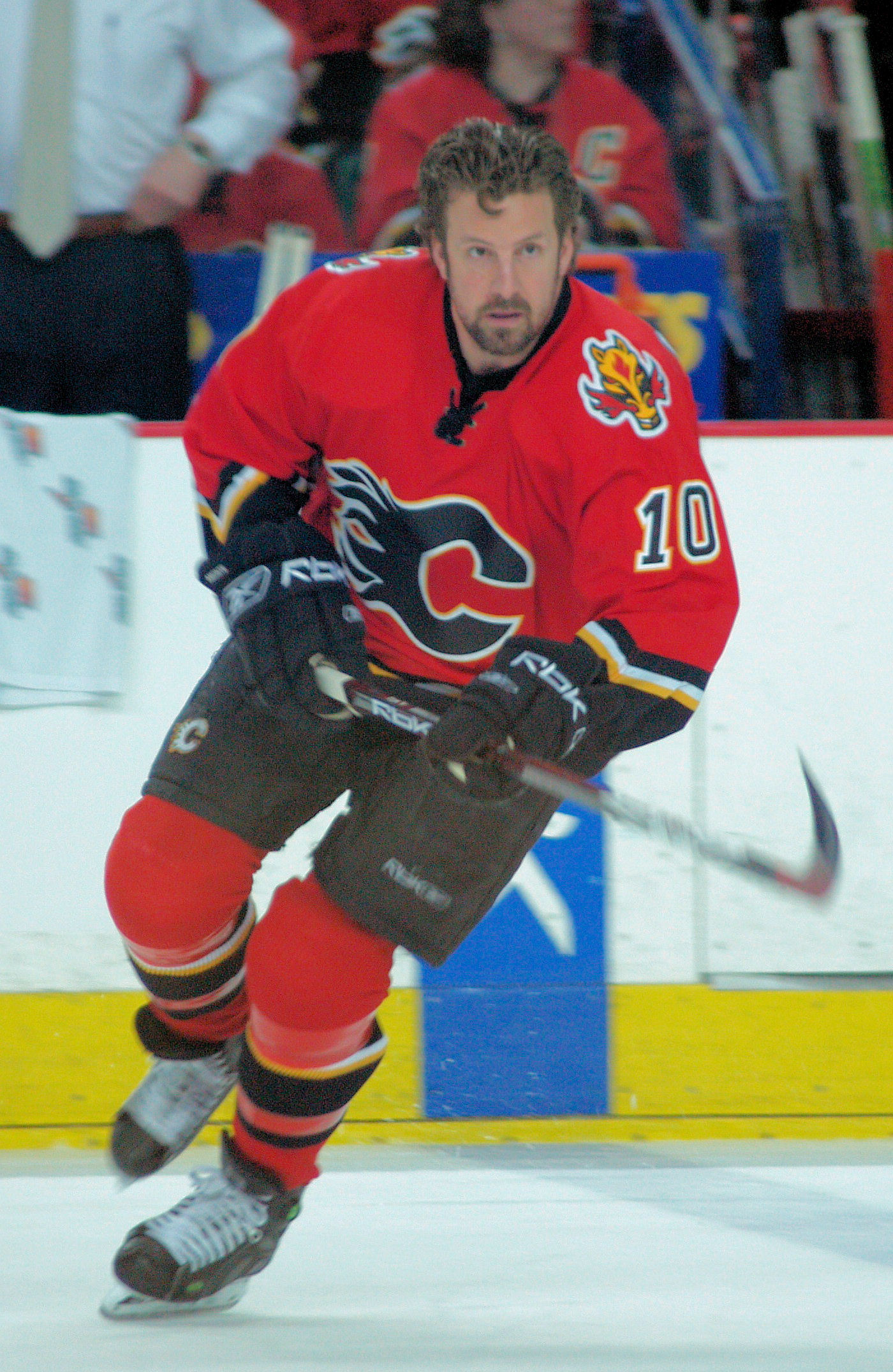
- Amonte with the Calgary Flames in 2007
- Born: August 2, 1970 (age 56) Hingham, Massachusetts, U.S.
- Height: 6 ft 0 in (183 cm)
- Weight: 202 lb (92 kg; 14 st 6 lb)
- Position: Right wing
- Shot: Left
- Played for: New York Rangers; Chicago Blackhawks; Phoenix Coyotes; Philadelphia Flyers; Calgary Flames
- National team: United States
- NHL draft: 68th overall, 1988; New York Rangers
- Playing career: 1991–2007
Medal record
Men's ice hockey
Representing the United States
Olympic Games
Silver medal – second place	2002 Salt Lake City	Team competition

Anthony Lewis Amonte (born August 2, 1970) is an American former professional ice hockey player. He played right wing over 17 seasons in the National Hockey League (NHL) for the New York Rangers, Chicago Blackhawks, Phoenix Coyotes, Philadelphia Flyers and the Calgary Flames. He previously served as the head coach of the Thayer Academy men's varsity hockey team. He is currently a scout with the Florida Panthers.

== Playing career ==
Drafted 68th overall in the 1988 NHL entry draft by the New York Rangers, Amonte is best known for his time as a scoring star with the Chicago Blackhawks and for representing the United States in international play. Amonte made his debut in the 1991 playoffs. He impressed as a rookie, scoring over 30 goals and placing third in the balloting for the Calder Memorial Trophy. He played three seasons with the Rangers, scoring 84 goals, before being traded to the Chicago Blackhawks with seven games to go in the 1993–94 season, the year the Rangers went on to win the Stanley Cup. He gained stardom in Chicago where he was initially reunited with former Thayer Academy teammate Jeremy Roenick, scoring at least 30 goals six times and at least 40 three times, including having a five-season-long streak in which he did not miss a single game.

Amonte, playing for Team USA, won the gold medal in the 1996 World Cup of Hockey tournament. Amonte scored the game-winning goal with just two and a half minutes left in the final against Team Canada.

He began the 2002–03 season with the Phoenix Coyotes and was traded to the Philadelphia Flyers near the end of the season. Amonte signed with the Calgary Flames as a free agent on August 2, 2005, and scored his 400th NHL goal for the Flames on December 10, 2005, against the Ottawa Senators.

As of March 2020, he is ranked 13th all-time in points among American-born players, with 900.

He announced his retirement via his personal website in 2008.

On January 21, 2009, the Chicago Blackhawks celebrated "Tony Amonte Heritage Night" at the United Center. They awarded the first 10,000 fans with special commemorative Tony Amonte pins.

== Transactions ==
- New York Rangers' 4th round draft choice in the 1988 NHL entry draft.
- March 21, 1994 - Traded by the New York Rangers, along with Matt Oates, to the Chicago Blackhawks in exchange for Stéphane Matteau and Brian Noonan.
- July 12, 2002 - Signed as a free agent with the Phoenix Coyotes.
- March 10, 2003 - Traded by the Phoenix Coyotes to the Philadelphia Flyers in exchange for Guillaume Lefebvre, Atlanta's 2003 3rd round draft choice, and Phoenix's 2004 2nd round draft choice.
- August 2, 2005 - Signed as a free agent with the Calgary Flames.

== Awards and honors ==
Award	Year
All-Hockey East Rookie Team	1989–90
All-Hockey East Second team	1990–91
All-NCAA All-Tournament Team	1991

- NHL All-Rookie Team - 1992
- Played in five NHL All-Star Games - 1997, 1998, 1999, 2000, 2001

== Career statistics ==
=== Regular season and playoffs ===
			Regular season					Playoffs
Season	Team	League	GP	G	A	Pts	PIM	GP	G	A	Pts	PIM
1985–86	Thayer Academy	HS-Prep	2	0	0	0	—	—	—	—	—	—
1986–87	Thayer Academy	HS-Prep	25	25	32	57	—	—	—	—	—	—
1987–88	Thayer Academy	HS-Prep	28	30	38	68	—	—	—	—	—	—
1988–89	Thayer Academy	HS-Prep	25	35	38	73	—	—	—	—	—	—
1989–90	Boston University	HE	41	25	33	58	52	—	—	—	—	—
1990–91	Boston University	HE	38	31	37	68	82	—	—	—	—	—
1990–91	New York Rangers	NHL	—	—	—	—	—	2	0	2	2	2
1991–92	New York Rangers	NHL	79	35	34	69	55	13	3	6	9	2
1992–93	New York Rangers	NHL	83	33	43	76	49	—	—	—	—	—
1993–94	New York Rangers	NHL	72	16	22	38	31	—	—	—	—	—
1993–94	Chicago Blackhawks	NHL	7	1	3	4	6	6	4	2	6	4
1994–95	HC Fassa	Euroliga	14	22	16	38	10	—	—	—	—	—
1994–95	Chicago Blackhawks	NHL	48	15	20	35	41	16	3	3	6	10
1995–96	Chicago Blackhawks	NHL	81	31	32	63	62	7	2	4	6	6
1996–97	Chicago Blackhawks	NHL	81	41	36	77	64	6	4	2	6	8
1997–98	Chicago Blackhawks	NHL	82	31	42	73	66	—	—	—	—	—
1998–99	Chicago Blackhawks	NHL	82	44	31	75	60	—	—	—	—	—
1999–00	Chicago Blackhawks	NHL	82	43	41	84	48	—	—	—	—	—
2000–01	Chicago Blackhawks	NHL	82	35	29	64	54	—	—	—	—	—
2001–02	Chicago Blackhawks	NHL	82	27	39	66	67	5	0	1	1	4
2002–03	Phoenix Coyotes	NHL	59	13	23	36	26	—	—	—	—	—
2002–03	Philadelphia Flyers	NHL	13	7	8	15	2	13	1	6	7	4
2003–04	Philadelphia Flyers	NHL	80	20	33	53	38	18	3	5	8	6
2005–06	Calgary Flames	NHL	80	14	28	42	43	7	2	1	3	10
2006–07	Calgary Flames	NHL	81	10	20	30	40	6	0	1	1	0
NHL totals			1,174	416	484	900	752	99	22	33	55	56

=== International ===
Year	Team	Event	GP	G	A	Pts	PIM
1989	United States	WJC	7	1	3	4	2
1990	United States	WJC	7	5	2	7	4
1991	United States	WC	10	2	5	7	4
1993	United States	WC	6	1	2	3	8
1996	United States	WCH	7	2	4	6	6
1998	United States	OLY	4	0	1	1	4
2002	United States	OLY	6	2	2	4	0
2004	United States	WCH	5	0	1	1	0
Junior totals			14	6	5	11	6
Senior totals			38	7	15	22	22

== International play ==
Played for the United States in:

- World Junior Championships – 1989, 1990
- World Championships - 1991, 1993
- 1996 World Cup of Hockey - 1996 (gold medal)
- Winter Olympic Games - 2002 (silver medal)

== Coaching career ==
On June 11, 2010, Tony was named the new head coach of the hockey program at his alma mater, Thayer Academy in Braintree, Massachusetts. On September 27, 2022, it was announced that Tony Amonte would step down as head coach of the Thayer Academy men's varsity hockey team. He stepped down in order to join the Florida Panthers as a scout.

== Family ==
Amonte is married with four children.

Amonte's sister is Kelly Amonte Hiller, head coach of the Northwestern University Wildcats women's lacrosse team. Hiller has guided the team to nine National Titles. Hiller was also a four-time All-American at the University of Maryland, College Park as a member of the Terrapins women's lacrosse team where she was two-time NCAA Division 1 Player of the Year in 1995 and 1996.

Amonte is the cousin of NHL player Charlie Coyle, who used to play for the Boston Bruins.

== See also ==
- List of NHL players with 1,000 games played

Sporting positions
Preceded by Doug Gilmour	Chicago Blackhawks captain 2000–02	Succeeded by Alexei Zhamnov
