= 1994–95 Austrian Hockey League season =

Austrian ice hockey season

The 1994–95 Austrian Hockey League season was the 65th season of the Austrian Hockey League, the top level of ice hockey in Austria. 10 teams participated in the league, and VEU Feldkirch won the championship.

== First round ==
| Place | Team | GP | W | T | L | GF–GA | Pts |
|---|---|---|---|---|---|---|---|
| 1 | EC VSV | 18 | 15 | 1 | 2 | 91:40 | 31 |
| 2 | EC KAC | 18 | 13 | 1 | 4 | 83:43 | 27 |
| 3 | EC Graz | 18 | 12 | 1 | 5 | 104:55 | 25 |
| 4 | VEU Feldkirch | 18 | 12 | 0 | 6 | 69:42 | 24 |
| 5 | EC Ehrwald | 18 | 8 | 0 | 10 | 62:68 | 16 |
| 6 | EHC Lustenau | 18 | 7 | 1 | 10 | 74:102 | 15 |
| 7 | CE Wien | 18 | 7 | 0 | 11 | 73:84 | 14 |
| 8 | Kapfenberger SV | 18 | 7 | 0 | 11 | 64:80 | 14 |
| 9 | EK Zell am See | 18 | 3 | 1 | 14 | 54:93 | 7 |
| 10 | EV Zeltweg | 18 | 3 | 1 | 14 | 48:115 | 7 |

== Second round ==
=== Playoff round ===
| Place | Team | GP | W | T | L | GF–GA | Pts (Bonus) |
|---|---|---|---|---|---|---|---|
| 1 | VEU Feldkirch | 10 | 9 | 1 | 0 | 55:20 | 20 (1) |
| 2 | EC KAC | 10 | 7 | 1 | 2 | 64:34 | 18 (3) |
| 3 | EC VSV | 10 | 5 | 1 | 4 | 45:31 | 15 (4) |
| 4 | EC Graz | 10 | 5 | 1 | 4 | 42:33 | 13 (2) |
| 5 | EC Ehrwald | 10 | 1 | 0 | 9 | 26:62 | 2 (0) |
| 6 | EHC Lustenau | 10 | 1 | 0 | 9 | 21:73 | 2 (0) |

=== Qualification round ===
| Place | Team | GP | W | T | L | GF–GA | Pts (Bonus) |
|---|---|---|---|---|---|---|---|
| 7 | SV Kapfenberg | 12 | 6 | 1 | 5 | 60:51 | 14 (1) |
| 8 | CE Wien | 12 | 5 | 2 | 5 | 65:62 | 14 (2) |
| 9 | EV Zeltweg | 12 | 6 | 1 | 5 | 62:71 | 13 (0) |
| 10 | EK Zell am See | 12 | 4 | 2 | 6 | 54:57 | 10 (0) |

== Playoffs ==
=== Quarterfinals ===
| Series | Match 1 | Match 2 | Match 3 | |
|---|---|---|---|---|
| VEU Feldkirch (1) - CE Wien (8) | 3:0 | 8:4 (3:0, 2:4, 3:0) | 6:0 (1:0, 3:0, 2:0) | 6:1 (3:1, 1:0, 2:0) |
| EC KAC (2) - SV Kapfenberg (7) | 3:0 | 5:3 (1:1, 2:0, 2:2) | 6:4 (3:1, 0:3, 3:0) | 9:3 (6:0, 3:2, 0:1) |
| EC VSV (3) - EHC Lustenau (6) | 3:0 | 7:1 (2:0, 1:1, 4:0) | 3:1 (0:0, 2:0, 1:1) | 12:0 (3:0, 6:0, 3:0) |
| EC Graz (4) - EC Ehrwald (5) | 3:0 | 7:3 (5:0, 0:2, 2:1) | 4:2 (1:1, 1:0, 2:1) | 6:2 (4:1, 1:1, 1:0) |

=== Semifinals ===
| Series | Score | Match 1 | Match 2 | Match 3 | Match 4 | Match 5 |
|---|---|---|---|---|---|---|
| VEU Feldkirch (1) - EC Graz (4) | 3:2 | 5:4 (3:!, 0:!, 2:2) | 1:5 (1:3, 0:0, 2:2 ) | 3:6 (1:1, 1:2, 1:3) | 4:2 (1:1, 3:1, 0:0) | 2:1 (0:0, 0:1, 1:0, 1:0) OT |
| EC KAC (2) - EC VSV (3) | 1:3 | 3:4 (0:1, 1:2, 2:0, 0:1) OT | 3:5 (0:!, 2:2, 1:2) | 4:3 (2:1, 1:1, 1:1) | 5:7 (1:1, 3:2, 1:4) | |

=== Final ===
| Series | Score | Match 1 | Match 2 | Match 3 | Match 4 | Match 5 |
|---|---|---|---|---|---|---|
| VEU Feldkirch (1) - EC VSV (2) | 3:2 | 4:0 (1:0, 3:0, 0:0) | 3:4 (0:3, 2:0, 1:1) | 5:2 (1:1, 2:0, 2:1) | 5:6 (0:0, 4:4, 1:2) | 2:0 (1:0, 1:0, 0:0) |

"Feldkirch"

Claus Dalpiaz, Reinhard Divis

Michael Lampert, Tom Searle, Karl Heinzle, Jurgen Burger, Wolfgang Strauss, Konrad Dorn, Dominic Lavoie

(Sweden) Thomas Rundqvist, Simon Wheeldon, Gerhard Puschnik, (Sweden) Bengt-Åke Gustafsson, Friedrich Ganster, Thomas Sticha, Franz Fussi, Siegfried Haberl, Martin Lindner

Ralph Krueger

== Relegation ==
| Series | Score | Match 1 | Match 2 | Match 3 | Match 4 | Match 5 |
|---|---|---|---|---|---|---|
| EV Zeltweg (9) - EK Zell am See (10) | 3:1 | 7:6 | 5:9 | 5:2 | 9:4 | |
