= 1994 Six Nations Tournament =

First playing of the Six Nations ice hockey Tournament

The 1994 Six Nations Tournament was the first playing of the Six Nations ice hockey Tournament. A total of 29 teams participated in the qualifying rounds, and the tournament was won by HC Bolzano.

== Qualification round ==
=== Atlantic League ===
Team	GP	W	T	L	GF	GA	Pts
Dragons de Rouen	12	12	0	0	83	30	24
Tilburg Trappers	12	7	1	4	82	44	15
Geleen Smoke Eaters	10	6	0	4	44	37	12
Hockey Club de Reims	12	5	2	5	45	58	12
Herning IK	12	4	4	4	41	43	12
Gothiques d'Amiens	12	3	0	9	26	80	5
Esbjerg IK	12	1	1	10	38	67	3

=== 1994–95 Alpenliga season ===
Team	GP	W	T	L	GF	GA	Pts
HC Courmaosta	14	11	1	2	86	21	23
VEU Feldkirch	14	11	0	3	86	21	22
AC Varese	14	9	1	4	59	33	19
HC Devils Milan	14	7	3	4	79	52	17
Chamonix Hockey Club	14	5	2	7	53	66	12
Saima Milan	14	4	2	8	50	73	10
CSG Grenoble	14	4	1	9	43	66	9
Bataillon de Joinville (Briançon)	14	0	0	14	43	139	0

=== Danube League ===
Team	GP	W	T	L	GF	GA	Pts
EC Graz	10	9	1	0	43	24	19
HK Celje	10	6	2	2	30	23	14
HDD Olimpija Ljubljana	10	6	1	3	48	25	13
Sportina Bled	10	3	0	7	25	37	6
CE Vienna	10	2	0	8	19	37	4
SV Kapfenberg	10	2	0	8	29	48	4

=== Adriatic League ===
Team	GP	W	T	L	GF	GA	Pts
HC Bolzano	14	12	2	0	80	39	26
Villacher SV	14	11	2	1	59	27	24
Klagenfurter AC	14	7	3	4	87	43	17
HK Jesenice	14	8	0	6	71	54	16
HC Alleghe	14	5	0	9	48	74	10
HC Fassa	14	3	2	9	48	74	8
HC Gherdëina	14	3	1	10	47	90	7
HC Brunico	14	1	2	11	40	98	4

== Final tournament ==
=== Semifinals ===
==== Group A ====
Team	Pts
Dragons de Rouen	5
Klagenfurter AC	4
VEU Feldkirch	3
HK Celje	0

==== Group B ====
Team	Pts
HC Bolzano	6
HC Varese	4
HC Courmaosta	2
Villacher SV	0

=== Final ===
- 6 December 1994, in Rouen : Dragons de Rouen – HC Bolzano 5–7
- 8 December 1994, in Bolzano : HC Bolzano – Dragons de Rouen 5–3
