= Mike McKee (ice hockey) =

Canadian ice hockey defenceman

- Born: June 18, 1969 (age 56) Toronto, Ontario, Canada
- Height: 6 ft 4 in (193 cm)
- Weight: 175 lb (79 kg; 12 st 7 lb)
- Position: Defence
- Shot: Left
- Played for: Quebec Nordiques
- NHL draft: 1990 NHL Supplemental Draft; Quebec Nordiques
- Playing career: 1992–1995

Michael G. McKee (born June 18, 1969) is a Canadian businessman and former professional ice hockey defenceman.

== Early life and education ==
McKee was born in Toronto, Ontario. He earned a Bachelor of Arts degree from Princeton University and a Master of Business Administration from Harvard Business School in 1999.

== Career ==
McKee was drafted out of Princeton University by the Quebec Nordiques in the 1990 NHL Supplemental Draft. He played 48 games in the National Hockey League with the Nordiques in the 1993–94 season, scoring three goals and adding twelve assists including scoring his first goal against Wayne Gretzky.

After retiring from professional hockey, McKee attended Harvard Business School with A.J. Rubado and Joel Bines and worked as a senior vice president at PTC and CFO of HighWired.com. He was previously an analyst at Broadview Associates, McKinsey & Company, and Goldman Sachs. In 2021, he became the president of Dotmatics. In 2023, he became CEO of Ataccama.

== Personal life ==
McKee has four children and lives in Newton, Massachusetts.

== Career statistics ==
=== Regular season and playoffs ===
			Regular season					Playoffs
Season	Team	League	GP	G	A	Pts	PIM	GP	G	A	Pts	PIM
1988–89	Princeton University	ECAC	23	4	4	8	25	—	—	—	—	—
1989–90	Princeton University	ECAC	26	7	18	25	18	—	—	—	—	—
1990–91	Princeton University	ECAC	15	1	4	5	16	—	—	—	—	—
1991–92	Princeton University	ECAC	27	12	17	29	34	—	—	—	—	—
1992–93	Halifax Citadels	AHL	32	6	7	13	25	—	—	—	—	—
1992–93	Greensboro Monarchs	ECHL	7	1	3	4	6	—	—	—	—	—
1993–94	Quebec Nordiques	NHL	48	3	12	15	41	—	—	—	—	—
1993–94	Cornwall Aces	AHL	24	6	14	20	18	10	0	3	3	4
1994–95	Cornwall Aces	AHL	36	2	11	13	24	—	—	—	—	—
NHL totals			48	3	12	15	41	—	—	—	—	—

== Awards and honors ==
Award	Year
All-ECAC Hockey Rookie Team	1988–89
All-ECAC Hockey Second Team	1989–90
