= 1995–96 Six Nations Tournament =

The 1995–96 Six Nations Tournament was the second and final playing of the Six Nations ice hockey Tournament. A total of 23 teams participated in the qualifying rounds, and the tournament was won by the Dragons de Rouen.

== Qualification round ==
=== Atlantic League ===
Team	GP	W	T	L	GF	GA	Pts
Dragons de Rouen	10	8	2	0	77	23	18
Hockey Club de Reims	10	3	3	4	39	38	9
Esbjerg IK	8	3	2	3	40	45	8
Herning IK	10	3	2	5	38	52	8
Gothiques d'Amiens	9	3	1	5	28	41	7
Tilburg Trappers	7	2	0	5	22	45	4

== Final ==
- December 21, 1995, in Feldkirch : VEU Feldkirch - Dragons de Rouen 2-5
- January 18, 1996, in Rouen : Dragons de Rouen - VEU Feldkirch 7-3
