= 1990 NHL supplemental draft =

Player selection draft

General information
- Date(s): June 15, 1990

Overview
- 26 total selections in 2 rounds
- First selection: (Canada) Mike McKee (Quebec Nordiques)

The 1990 NHL supplemental draft was the fifth NHL supplemental draft. It was held on June 15, 1990.

== Selections by round ==
=== Round one ===
The first round was limited to teams that missed the 1990 Stanley Cup playoffs.

Pick #	Player	Nationality	NHL team	College (league)
1	Mike McKee (D)	Canada	Quebec Nordiques	Princeton University (ECAC)
2	Paul Dukovac (D)	Canada	Vancouver Canucks	Cornell University (ECAC)
3	Mike Casselman (LW)	Canada	Detroit Red Wings	Clarkson University (ECAC)
4	Steve Beadle (D)	United States	Philadelphia Flyers	Michigan State University (CCHA)
5	Joe Dragon (C)	Canada	Pittsburgh Penguins	Cornell University (ECAC)

=== Round two ===
Pick #	Player	Nationality	NHL team	College (league)
6	Darryl Noren (C)	United States	Quebec Nordiques	University of Illinois Chicago (CCHA)
7	Normand Krumpschmid (C)	Canada	Vancouver Canucks	Ferris State University (CCHA)
8	Donny Oliver (LW)	Canada	Detroit Red Wings	Ohio State University (CCHA)
9	Ray Letourneau (G)	United States	Philadelphia Flyers	Yale University (ECAC)
10	Savo Mitrovic (C)	Canada	Pittsburgh Penguins	University of New Hampshire (Hockey East)
11	Brandon Reed (G)	United States	New York Islanders	Lake Superior State University (CCHA)
12	Peter Sentner (D)	United States	Los Angeles Kings	University of Massachusetts Lowell (Hockey East)
13	Rod Houk (G)	Canada	Minnesota North Stars	University of Regina (CWUAA)
14	Martin Jiranek (C)	Canada	Washington Capitals	Bowling Green State University (CCHA)
15	Martin Robitaille (C)	Canada	Toronto Maple Leafs	University of Maine (Hockey East)
16	Mike Haviland (F)	United States	New Jersey Devils	Elmira College (ECAC West)
17	Geoff Sarjeant (G)	Canada	St. Louis Blues	Michigan Technological University (WCHA)
18	Mike Gilmore (G)	United States	New York Rangers	Michigan State University (CCHA)
19	Mark Richards (G)	United States	Winnipeg Jets	University of Massachusetts Lowell (Hockey East)
20	Jim Crozier (G)	United States	Hartford Whalers	Cornell University (ECAC)
21	Claude Maillet (D)	Canada	Chicago Blackhawks	Merrimack College (Hockey East)
22	Sandy Galuppo (G)	United States	Edmonton Oilers	Boston College (Hockey East)
23	Bruce Coles (LW)	Canada	Montreal Canadiens	Rensselaer Polytechnic Institute (ECAC)
24	Shane McFarlane (C)	United States	Buffalo Sabres	University of North Dakota (WCHA)
25	Lyle Wildgoose (LW)	Canada	Calgary Flames	Providence College (Hockey East)
26	Howie Rosenblatt (RW)	United States	Boston Bruins	Merrimack College (Hockey East)

== See also ==
- 1990 NHL entry draft
- 1990–91 NHL season
- List of NHL players
