= Fritz Ganster =

Austrian ice hockey player

Personal information
- Nationality: Austrian
- Born: 4 September 1960 (age 65) Zeltweg, Austria

Sport
- Sport: Ice hockey

Fritz Ganster (born 4 September 1960) is an Austrian ice hockey player. He competed in the men's tournament at the 1984 Winter Olympics.
