= Konrad Dorn =

Austrian ice hockey player

Personal information
- Nationality: Austrian
- Born: 29 October 1962 (age 63) Feldkirch, Austria

Sport
- Sport: Ice hockey

Konrad Dorn (born 29 October 1962) is an Austrian ice hockey player. He competed in the men's tournaments at the 1984 Winter Olympics and the 1988 Winter Olympics.
