= Karl Heinzle =

Austrian ice hockey player

Personal information
- Nationality: Austrian
- Born: 31 July 1960 (age 64); Feldkirch, Austria

Sport
- Sport: Ice hockey

Karl Heinzle (born 31 July 1960) is an Austrian ice hockey player. He competed in the men's tournament at the 1994 Winter Olympics.
