= 1997–98 European Hockey League =

The 1997–98 European Hockey League was the second edition of the European Hockey League. The season started on September 16, 1997, and finished on January 25, 1998.

The tournament was won by VEU Feldkirch, who beat HC Dynamo Moscow in the final.

A new points system was used in the first round of the tournament. The winner in regular time won 3 points; in case of a tie, an overtime is played, the winner in overtime won 2 points and the loser in overtime won 1 point.

== First round ==
=== Group A ===
Team #1	Score	Team #2
Färjestad BK (Sweden)	3:0	(Finland) Jokerit
Kassel Huskies (Germany)	5:0	(Czech Republic) HC Vítkovice Steel
Jokerit (Finland)	4:1	(Germany) Kassel Huskies
HC Vítkovice Steel (Czech Republic)	2:4	(Sweden) Färjestad BK
Färjestad BK (Sweden)	4:2	(Czech Republic) HC Vítkovice Steel
Kassel Huskies (Germany)	4:5 (OT)	(Finland) Jokerit
HC Vítkovice Steel (Czech Republic)	0:3	(Finland) Jokerit
Kassel Huskies (Germany)	0:6	(Sweden) Färjestad BK
Jokerit (Finland)	2:1 (OT)	(Czech Republic) HC Vítkovice Steel
Färjestad BK (Sweden)	5:3	(Germany) Kassel Huskies
Jokerit (Finland)	3:4	(Sweden) Färjestad BK
HC Vítkovice Steel (Czech Republic)	3:4	(Germany) Kassel Huskies

=== Group A standings ===
Rank	Team	Points
1	(Sweden) Färjestad BK	18
2	(Finland) Jokerit	10
3	(Germany) Kassel Huskies	7
4	(Czech Republic) HC Vítkovice Steel	1

=== Group B ===
Team #1	Score	Team #2
Adler Mannheim (Germany)	3:5	(Finland) HPK
Leksands IF (Sweden)	5:3	(Slovakia) HK Dukla Trenčín
Adler Mannheim (Germany)	8:5	(Sweden) Leksands IF
HPK (Finland)	3:2	(Slovakia) HK Dukla Trenčín
HK Dukla Trenčín (Slovakia)	4:1	(Germany) Adler Mannheim
HPK (Finland)	3:8	(Sweden) Leksands IF
Leksands IF (Sweden)	3:4	(Finland) HPK
Adler Mannheim (Germany)	2:0	(Slovakia) HK Dukla Trenčín
HK Dukla Trenčín (Slovakia)	1:2 (OT)	(Finland) HPK
Leksands IF (Sweden)	8:2	(Germany) Adler Mannheim
HK Dukla Trenčín (Slovakia)	2:4	(Sweden) Leksands IF
HPK (Finland)	6:4	(Germany) Adler Mannheim

=== Group B standings ===
Rank	Team	Points
1	(Finland) HPK	14
2	(Sweden) Leksands IF	12
3	(Germany) Adler Mannheim	6
4	(Slovakia) HK Dukla Trenčín	4

=== Group C ===
Team #1	Score	Team #2
Storhamar (Norway)	2:1 (OT)	(Switzerland) SC Bern
VEU Feldkirch (Austria)	4:3	(Germany) Kölner Haie
SC Bern (Switzerland)	4:5	(Germany) Kölner Haie
Storhamar (Norway)	3:1	(Austria) VEU Feldkirch
Kölner Haie (Germany)	5:1	(Norway) Storhamar
VEU Feldkirch (Austria)	6:3	(Switzerland) SC Bern
Storhamar (Norway)	2:3	(Germany) Kölner Haie
SC Bern (Switzerland)	2:3	(Austria) VEU Feldkirch
Kölner Haie (Germany)	4:2	(Switzerland) SC Bern
VEU Feldkirch (Austria)	3:0	(Norway) Storhamar
Kölner Haie (Germany)	3:5	(Austria) VEU Feldkirch
SC Bern (Switzerland)	4:1	(Norway) Storhamar

=== Group C standings ===
Rank	Team	Points
1	(Austria) VEU Feldkirch	15
2	(Germany) Kölner Haie	12
3	(Norway) Storhamar	5
4	(Switzerland) SC Bern	4

=== Group D ===
Team #1	Score	Team #2
TPS (Finland)	3:2 (OT)	(Slovakia) HC Slovan Bratislava
Torpedo Yaroslavl (Russia)	4:2	(Sweden) Luleå HF
Torpedo Yaroslavl (Russia)	2:0	(Slovakia) HC Slovan Bratislava
Luleå HF (Sweden)	5:1	(Finland) TPS
Torpedo Yaroslavl (Russia)	3:1	(Finland) TPS
Luleå HF (Sweden)	2:3	(Slovakia) HC Slovan Bratislava
TPS (Finland)	2:3	(Russia) Torpedo Yaroslavl
HC Slovan Bratislava (Slovakia)	4:3	(Sweden) Luleå HF
TPS (Finland)	2:3 (OT)	(Sweden) Luleå HF
HC Slovan Bratislava (Slovakia)	5:1	(Russia) Torpedo Yaroslavl
Luleå HF (Sweden)	0:2	(Russia) Torpedo Yaroslavl
HC Slovan Bratislava (Slovakia)	3:1	(Finland) TPS

=== Group D standings ===
Rank	Team	Points
1	(Russia) Torpedo Yaroslavl	15
2	(Slovakia) HC Slovan Bratislava	13
3	(Sweden) Luleå HF	5
4	(Finland) TPS	3

=== Group E ===
Team #1	Score	Team #2
HC Lada Togliatti (Russia)	4:3 (OT)	(Czech Republic) HC Petra Vsetín
EV Zug (Switzerland)	8:1	(France) HC Amiens Somme
HC Petra Vsetín (Czech Republic)	5:3	(Switzerland) EV Zug
HC Amiens Somme (France)	1:7	(Russia) HC Lada Togliatti
EV Zug (Switzerland)	4:1	(Russia) HC Lada Togliatti
HC Amiens Somme (France)	1:4	(Czech Republic) HC Petra Vsetín
HC Petra Vsetín (Czech Republic)	4:2	(France) HC Amiens Somme
HC Lada Togliatti (Russia)	3:0	(Switzerland) EV Zug
HC Lada Togliatti (Russia)	7:1	(France) HC Amiens Somme
EV Zug (Switzerland)	0:4	(Czech Republic) HC Petra Vsetín
HC Petra Vsetín (Czech Republic)	3:4 (OT)	(Russia) HC Lada Togliatti
HC Amiens Somme (France)	1:2	(Switzerland) EV Zug

=== Group E standings ===
Rank	Team	Points
1	(Czech Republic) HC Petra Vsetín	14
2	(Russia) HC Lada Togliatti	13
3	(Switzerland) EV Zug	9
4	(France) HC Amiens Somme	0

=== Group F ===
Team #1	Score	Team #2
HC Sparta Praha (Czech Republic)	0:4	(Russia) HC Dynamo Moscow
HC Bolzano (Italy)	6:5 (OT)	(United Kingdom) Manchester Storm
HC Sparta Praha (Czech Republic)	4:1	(Italy) HC Bolzano
Manchester Storm (United Kingdom)	2:3 (OT)	(Russia) HC Dynamo Moscow
HC Sparta Praha (Czech Republic)	3:4	(United Kingdom) Manchester Storm
HC Dynamo Moscow (Russia)	9:1	(Italy) HC Bolzano
Manchester Storm (United Kingdom)	7:0	(Czech Republic) HC Sparta Praha
HC Bolzano (Italy)	0:4	(Russia) HC Dynamo Moscow
HC Dynamo Moscow (Russia)	9:3	(United Kingdom) Manchester Storm
HC Bolzano (Italy)	1:3	(Czech Republic) HC Sparta Praha
HC Dynamo Moscow (Russia)	3:2 (OT)	(Czech Republic) HC Sparta Praha
Manchester Storm (United Kingdom)	4:2	(Italy) HC Bolzano

=== Group F standings ===
Rank	Team	Points
1	(Russia) HC Dynamo Moscow	16
2	(United Kingdom) Manchester Storm	11
3	(Czech Republic) HC Sparta Praha	7
4	(Italy) HC Bolzano	2

== Quarterfinals ==
Team #1	Score	Team #2
HPK (Finland)	4:4	(Austria) VEU Feldkirch
HC Lada Togliatti (Russia)	2:1	(Russia) Torpedo Yaroslavl
HC Slovan Bratislava (Slovakia)	6:3	(Czech Republic) HC Petra Vsetín
HC Dynamo Moscow (Russia)	5:2	(Sweden) Färjestad BK
VEU Feldkirch (Austria)	7:2	(Finland) HPK
Torpedo Yaroslavl (Russia)	7:3	(Russia) HC Lada Togliatti
HC Petra Vsetín (Czech Republic)	5:0	(Slovakia) HC Slovan Bratislava
Färjestad BK (Sweden)	5:3	(Russia) HC Dynamo Moscow

== Final stage ==
(Feldkirch, Austria)

=== Semifinals ===
Team #1	Score	Team #2
VEU Feldkirch (Austria)	3:2	(Czech Republic) HC Petra Vsetín
HC Dynamo Moscow (Russia)	1:0	(Russia) Torpedo Yaroslavl

=== Third place match ===
Team #1	Score	Team #2
HC Petra Vsetín (Czech Republic)	3:1	(Russia) Torpedo Yaroslavl

=== Final ===
Team #1	Score	Team #2
VEU Feldkirch (Austria)	5:3	(Russia) HC Dynamo Moscow
