= Six Nations Tournament (ice hockey) =

1994–1996 ice hockey club competition

The Six Nations Tournament (Italian: Torneo Sei Nazioni, German: Sechs-Nationen-Turnier) was an international ice hockey club competition that took place during the 1994–95 and 1995-96 seasons. The event was sometimes called Cup of the European Leagues (Italian: Europa Ligacup, German: Europäischer Ligacup, French: Coupe des Ligues Européennes).

== History ==
The Six Nations Tournament is an offshoot of the Alpenliga, an international league created in 1991, featuring teams from Northern Italy and the adjacent nations of Austria and Slovenia.

In 1994, the Alpenliga was temporarily merged into the newly created Six Nations Tournament. The Alpenliga (or Alpine League in English) retained teams from Northwestern Italy and Western Austria, and added teams from the French Alps. 3 new leagues were created:
The Adriatic League for teams from Northeastern Italy and Southern Austria.
The Atlantic League for teams from Northern France, the Netherlands and Denmark
The Danube League for teams from Eastern Austria and Slovenia.

Top ranked teams from the four leagues met in a joint tournament, which ended with HC Bolzano of Italy (led by star winger Jaromír Jágr) defeating Rouen HC of France in a 2-legged final.

In 1995, the Adriatic League and the Danube League were merged back into the Alpenliga, losing teams from the French Alps in the process. Thus the Alpenliga became an Italian-Austrian-Slovenian affair again. Meanwhile, the Atlantic League continued with its lineup of teams from Northern France, the Netherlands and Denmark.

For the 1995-96 season, the Alpenliga announced that it would hold its own playoffs again, and resurrect the Alpenliga title. The news came to the surprise of Atlantic League members. The Atlantic League schedule only consisted of a regular season, and table leader Rouen HC fully expected some kind of post season confrontation between the best Atlantic and Alpine teams for the Six Nations crown. A late agreement was reached between Rouen HC and Alpenliga playoff champion VEU Feldkirch to play a grand final for the unified title. Rouen HC took both games of the home and home series to win the second and final edition of the competition.

The Atlantic League did not play the following season and never resumed operations.
The Alpenliga remained active until 1998-99 before morphing into the Interliga, another crossborder competition with an increased focus on Central European Slavic nations.

== Bataillon de Joinville ==
Among French-based organizations that joined the Alpine League for the 1994-95 season was the Bataillon de Joinville, a short-lived team consisting of players serving in the army (France then used a compulsory military service). The now defunct Bataillon de Joinville was a unit designed to house athletically gifted servicemen. Its headquarters were in the Paris suburbs. Previously, Joinville servicemen in need of ice time had used the Palais des Sports de Paris. For practical reasons, the Bataillon de Joinville Six Nations Tournament team used Patinoire René Froger in Briançon, as its primary venue. The young squad went winless in its only season of competitive hockey.

== Results ==
Final	Home team	Score	Away team	Venue	Attendance
1994	(France) Rouen HC	5–7	(Italy) HC Bolzano	Patinoire Ile Lacroix	N/A
1994	(Italy) HC Bolzano	5–3	(France) Rouen HC	Palaonda	N/A
1994	Bolzano wins 12-8 on aggregate				
1995-96	(Austria) VEU Feldkirch	2–5	(France) Rouen HC	Vorarlberghalle	4942
1995-96	(France) Rouen HC	7–3	(Austria) VEU Feldkirch	Patinoire Ile Lacroix	3800
1995-96	Rouen wins series 2 games to none				
