= EC Kapfenberg =

Ice hockey team in Austria, 1981 to 2002

- Sport: Ice hockey
- Founded: 1981; 45 years ago
- Folded: 2002; 24 years ago
- Location: Kapfenberg, Austria
- League titles: 4

EC Kapfenberg is a defunct professional ice hockey team that played in the Austrian Hockey League. Based in Kapfenberg, Austria, they were active from 1981 to 2002.
