= 1994–95 Alpenliga season =

The 1994–95 Alpenliga season was held as part as the newly created Six Nations Tournament as the Alpenliga had merged into it temporarily. In addition to teams from Northwestern Italy and Western Austria, this season also featured teams from the French Alps. Three new leagues - the Adriatic League, the Atlantic League and the Danube League were also created. Teams from the Alpenliga played off against teams from the other three leagues in the 1994 Six Nations Tournament.

== Final table ==
| Team | GP | W | T | L | GF | GA | Pts |
|---|---|---|---|---|---|---|---|
| HC Courmaosta | 14 | 11 | 1 | 2 | 86 | 21 | 23 |
| VEU Feldkirch | 14 | 11 | 0 | 3 | 86 | 21 | 22 |
| AC Varese | 14 | 9 | 1 | 4 | 59 | 33 | 19 |
| HC Devils Milan | 14 | 7 | 3 | 4 | 79 | 52 | 17 |
| Chamonix Hockey Club | 14 | 5 | 2 | 7 | 53 | 66 | 12 |
| Saima Milan | 14 | 4 | 2 | 8 | 50 | 73 | 10 |
| CSG Grenoble | 14 | 4 | 1 | 9 | 43 | 66 | 9 |
| Bataillon de Joinville (Briançon) | 14 | 0 | 0 | 14 | 43 | 139 | 0 |
