= 1996–97 Alpenliga season =

This was the 1996–97 Alpenliga season, the sixth season of the multi-national ice hockey league. 11 teams participated in the league, and VEU Feldkirch of Austria won the championship by defeating Olimpija Ljubljana of Slovenia.

== Regular season ==
Place	Team	GP	Pts	W	T	L	GF:GA	GD
1	Austria VEU Feldkirch	40	65	31	3	6	177:95	+82
2	Austria EC VSV	40	55	25	5	10	194:125	+69
3	Slovenia HDD Olimpija Ljubljana	40	48	21	6	13	200:157	+43
4	Austria EC KAC	40	48	21	6	13	162:126	+36
5	Italy HC Bozen	40	43	19	5	16	171:155	+16
6	Austria EC Kapfenberg	40	41	16	9	15	134:124	+10
7	Italy HC Milan 24	40	40	18	4	18	190:174	+16
8	Slovenia HK Jesenice	40	34	15	4	21	131:163	-32
9	Austria CE Wien	40	32	15	2	23	135-148	-13
10	Slovenia HK Bled	40	27	11	5	24	118:194	-76
11	Austria EC Graz	40	7	2	3	35	124:275	-151

== Playoffs ==
=== Group phase ===
Group A
Place	Team	GP	Pts	W	T	L	GF:GA	GD
1	Slovenia HDD Olimpija Ljubljana	3	4	2	0	1	14:11	+3
2	Austria EC VSV	3	3	1	1	1	18:11	+7
3	Slovenia HK Jesenice	3	3	1	1	1	7:17	-10
4	Italy HC Milan 24	3	2	1	0	2	10:10	0

Group B
Place	Team	GP	Pts	W	T	L	GF:GA	GD
1	Austria VEU Feldkirch	3	6	3	0	0	19:8	+11
2	Austria EC KAC	3	4	2	0	1	11:5	+6
3	Italy HC Bozen	3	1	0	1	2	13:16	-3
4	Slovenia HK Bled	3	1	0	1	2	13:27	-14

=== Final ===
- HDD Olimpija Ljubljana – VEU Feldkirch: 4:4 (2:2, 1:2, 1:0)
- VEU Feldkirch – Olimpija Ljubljana: 6:1 (1:0, 2:0, 3:1)
