= 1995–96 Alpenliga season =

The 1995-96 Alpenliga season was the fifth season of the multi-national Alpenliga ice hockey league. 17 teams participated in three groups – Western, Central, and Eastern. VEU Feldkirch of Austria won the championship by defeating CE Wien in the final.

== Regular season ==
=== West Group ===
Place	Team	GP	Pts	W	T	L	GF:GA	GD
1	Austria VEU Feldkirch	8	12	6	0	2	78:25	+53
2	Italy HC Varèse	8	12	6	0	2	38:25	+13
3	Austria EHC Lustenau	8	8	4	0	4	40:31	+9
4	Italy HC 24 Milan	8	8	4	0	4	44:39	+5
5	Italy Devils Milan	8	0	0	0	8	13:93	-80

=== Central Group ===
Place	Team	GP	Pts	W	T	L	GF:GA	GD
1	Austria Kac	10	18	9	0	1	60:31	+29
2	Slovenia Olimpija	10	14	7	0	3	60:33	+27
3	Austria EC VSV	10	14	7	0	3	60:34	+26
4	Italy HC Bozen	10	8	4	0	6	41:48	-7
5	Italy Asiago Hockey	10	4	2	0	8	26:61	-35
6	Italy HC Alleghe	10	2	1	0	9	23:63	-40

=== East Group ===
Place	Team	GP	Pts	W	T	L	GF:GA	GD
1	Slovenia HK Jesenice	10	14	7	0	3	41:33	+8
2	Austria CE Wien	10	12	6	0	4	47:35	+12
3	Italy HC Gherdeina	10	10	5	0	5	56:44	+12
4	Italy SHC Fassa	10	10	5	0	5	37:47	-10
5	Slovenia HK Bled	10	8	4	0	6	38:38	0
6	Italy SG Brunico	10	6	3	0	7	26:48	-22

== Playoffs ==
=== Play-in ===
- HC Varèse (W2) – CE Wien (O2): 3:6
- HK Jesenice (O1) – HDD Olimpija Ljubljana (M2): 2:4

=== Semifinals ===
- VEU Feldkirch (W1) – HDD Olimpija Ljubljana (M2): 5:3
- EC KAC (M1) – CE Wien (O2): 1:2

=== 3rd place ===
- EC KAC (M1) – HDD Olimpija Ljubljana (M2): 0:2

=== Final ===
- VEU Feldkirch (W1) – CE Wien (O2): 4:0
