= 1995–96 Austrian Hockey League season =

Austrian ice hockey season

The 1995–96 Austrian Hockey League season was the 66th season of the Austrian Hockey League, the top level of ice hockey in Austria. Eight teams participated in the league, and VEU Feldkirch won the championship.

== Regular season ==
Place	Team	GP	W	T	L	GF–GA	Pts
1	VEU Feldkirch	28	23	3	2	170:63	49
2	EC KAC	28	17	5	6	137:78	39
3	EC VSV	28	15	8	5	149:82	38
4	CE Wien	28	12	8	8	130:97	32
5	EHC Lustenau	28	11	2	15	106:116	24
6	SV Kapfenberg	28	7	6	15	80:124	20
7	EC Graz	28	4	5	19	67:162	13
8	EV Zeltweg	28	3	3	22	75:192	9

== Playoffs ==
=== Quarterfinals ===
Series	Match 1	Match 2
VEU Feldkirch (1) - EV Zeltweg (8)	10:2	9:1
EC KAC (2) - EC Graz (7)	12:3	8:0
EC VSV (3) - SV Kapfenberg (6)	7:3	9:3
CE Wien (4) - EHC Lustenau (5)	4:2	7:2

=== Semifinals ===
Series	Score	Match 1	Match 2	Match 3	Match 4	Match 5
VEU Feldkirch (1) - CE Wien (4)	3:0	9:3	6:3	7:3		
EC KAC (2) - EC VSV (3)	3:1	5:4	0:3	2:1	6:3	

=== Final ===
Series	Score	Match 1	Match 2	Match 3	Match 4	Match 5
VEU Feldkirch (1) - EC KAC (2)	3:1	2:1	4:7	3:2	5:0	
