= 1996–97 Austrian Hockey League season =

Austrian ice hockey season

The 1996–97 Austrian Hockey League season was the 67th season of the Austrian Hockey League, the top level of ice hockey in Austria. Six teams participated in the league, and VEU Feldkirch won the championship. EC KAC, EC VSV, and VEU Feldkirch all received byes until the playoffs, as they were also competing in the Alpenliga.

== Regular season ==
Place	Team	GP	W	T	L	GF–GA	Pts
1	EC Kapfenberg	4	3	0	1	20:13	6
2	CE Wien	4	3	0	1	29:14	6
3	EC Graz	4	0	0	4	14:36	0

== Playoffs ==
Semifinals
1	VEU Feldkirch	4
4	EC Kapfenberg	1
2	EC VSV	2
3	EC KAC	4

Final
1	VEU Feldkirch	4
3	EC KAC	2
