= 1999–2000 Interliga season =

The 1999–2000 Interliga season was the first season of the multi-national ice hockey league. Eight teams participated in the league, and EC KAC from Austria have won the championship.

== Regular season ==
Place	Team	GP	Pts	W (OTW)	L (OTL)	GF–GA	GD
1	EC VSV	28	52	25 (3)	3 (2)	145–64	+81
2	EC KAC	28	45	22 (3)	6 (1)	150–63	+87
3	VEU Feldkirch	28	36	16 (2)	12 (4)	128–93	+35
4	Olimpija	28	31	15 (2)	13 (1)	103–121	–18
5	Wiener EV	28	28	12 (2)	16 (4)	111–110	+1
6	Dunaújvárosi Acélbikák	28	22	9 (2)	19 (4)	80–119	–39
7	Alba Volán Székesfehérvár	28	15	7 (2)	21 (1)	81–151	–70
8	Jesenice	28	12	6 (1)	22 (0)	44–121	–77

== Play-offs ==
=== Quarter-finals ===
Series	Game 1	Game 2
Jesenice (8) – EC VSV (1)	0–7	3–6
Wiener EV (5) – Olimpija (4)	2–5	4–5
Alba Volán Székesfehérvár (7) – EC KAC (2)	2–4	4–7
Dunaújvárosi Acélbikák (6) – VEU Feldkirch (3)	3–0	0–4

=== Semi-finals ===
Series	Game 1	Game 2
Olimpija (4) – EC VSV (1)	1–3	4–6
VEU Feldkirch (3) – EC KAC (2)	1–1	2–6

=== Final ===
Series	Game 1	Game 2
EC KAC (2) – EC VSV (1)	4–1	1–1
