= EC Graz =

- City: Graz, Styria, Austria
- League: Alpenliga; 1991–1998; Austrian Hockey League; 1990–1998
- Founded: 1990
- Dissolved: 1998
- Home arena: Eisstadion Graz Liebenau
- Colors: Black, Yellow
- Owner(s): Hannes Kartnig

EC Graz was an Austrian ice hockey team from Graz, Styria, playing in the Austrian Hockey League and Alpenliga in the 1990s.

== History ==
The EC Graz (also called "the elephants") emerged in 1990 when the UEC Graz and ATSE Graz were merged. ATSE Graz finished 2nd in the Austrian National League and therefore qualified for the Austrian Hockey League season 1989/90. UEC Graz, which was founded in 1985, qualified for the Austrian National League the same year. Both clubs united in April 1990, in the following season ATSE was removed from the name. The club experienced its heyday under President Hannes Kartnig, finishing three times the runner-up title in the seasons 1991-92, 1992–93 and 1993–94 despite running at a high financial cost. Accompanying marketing made ice hockey popular in Graz in this period, but in 1998 the club went bankrupt shortly after the departure of its president Hannes Kartnig. The EHC Graz was established in 1998 to rescue ice hockey in Graz, just to become bankrupt the same year. In 1999 Jochen Pildner-Steinburg founded the Graz 99ers as the successor club of the EC Graz to offer Hockey League back in the Styrian capital.

== Former players ==
- Neil Belland
- Daniel Berthiaume
- Bill Gardner
- Brent Gretzky
- Wayne Groulx
- Don Nachbaur
- Kent Nilsson
- Todd Reirden
- Matthias Trattnig
- Martin Ulrich
