= 1997–98 Alpenliga season =

This was the 1997-98 Alpenliga season, the seventh season of the multi-national ice hockey league. Nine teams participated in the league, and VEU Feldkirch of Austria won the championship by defeating EC KAC in the final.

== Regular season ==
Place	Team	GP	Pts	W	T	L	GF:GA	GD
1	Austria VEU Feldkirch	16	23	10	3	3	68:33	+35
2	Austria EC KAC	16	21	9	3	4	69:41	+28
3	Austria Wiener EV	16	20	9	2	5	61:33	+28
4	Austria EC VSV	16	20	9	2	5	67:48	+19
5	Austria Kapfenberger SV	16	16	7	2	7	40:47	-7
6	Austria EC Graz	16	14	6	2	8	62:77	-15
7	Slovenia Jesenice	16	13	5	3	8	54:65	-11
8	Slovenia Bled	16	10	2	6	8	45:76	-31
9	Slovenia Olimpija	16	7	3	1	12	38:84	-46

== Playoffs ==
=== Group phase ===
Group A
Place	Team	GP	Pts	W	T	L	GF:GA	GD
1	Austria VEU Feldkirch	3	6	3	0	0	12:6	+6
2	Austria EC VSV	3	4	2	0	1	11:5	+6
3	Austria Kapfenberger SV	3	1	0	1	2	6:11	-5
4	Slovenia HK Bled	2	1	0	1	2	7:14	-7

Group B
Place	Team	GP	Pts	W	T	L	GF:GA	GD
1	Austria EC KAC	3	5	2	1	0	15:9	+6
2	Austria Wiener EV	3	4	2	0	1	22:11	+11
3	Austria EC Graz	3	3	1	1	1	10:15	-5
4	Slovenia HK Jesenice	3	0	0	0	3	6:18	-12

=== Final ===
- Game 1 (4. December 1997), EC KAC – VEU Feldkirch: 3:5 (1:3, 2:0, 0:2)
- Game 2 (6. December 1997), VEU Feldkirch – EC KAC: 4:4 (3:2, 0:2, 1:0)
