= 1998–99 Alpenliga season =

The 1998–99 Alpenliga season was the eight and final season of the multi-national Alpenliga ice hockey league. 16 teams participated in the league, and VEU Feldkirch of Austria won the championship by defeating HC Bozen of Italy in the final. The Alpenliga was replaced by the Interliga for the 1999–00.

== Regular season ==
| Place | Team | GP | W (OTW) | L (OTL) | GF:GA | Pts |
|---|---|---|---|---|---|---|
| 1 | (Austria) EC VSV | 30 | 27 (0) | 3 (0) | 197:71 | 57 |
| 2 | (Austria) EC KAC | 30 | 24 (1) | 6 (0) | 169:82 | 48 |
| 3 | (Austria) Wiener EV | 30 | 22 (1) | 8 (2) | 164:89 | 46 |
| 4 | (Austria) VEU Feldkirch | 30 | 23 (1) | 7 (0) | 154:80 | 46 |
| 5 | (Italy) HC Bozen | 30 | 19 (0) | 11 (1) | 166:113 | 39 |
| 6 | (Italy) WSV Sterzing Broncos | 30 | 18 (3) | 12 (1) | 132:131 | 37 |
| 7 | (Slovenia) Olimpija | 30 | 16 (2) | 14 (2) | 158:115 | 34 |
| 8 | (Italy) HC Meran | 30 | 16 (0) | 14 (2) | 150:129 | 34 |
| 9 | (Italy) Asiago Hockey | 30 | 16 (1) | 14 (1) | 133:136 | 33 |
| 10 | (Italy) SG Cortina | 30 | 14 (1) | 16 (2) | 119:136 | 30 |
| 11 | (Slovenia) Jesenice | 30 | 13 (4) | 17 (1) | 89:109 | 27 |
| 12 | (Italy) HC Alleghe | 30 | 8 (2) | 22 (3) | 106:161 | 19 |
| 13 | (Italy) SHC Fassa | 30 | 8 (3) | 22 (2) | 96:144 | 18 |
| 14 | (Italy) SG Brunico | 30 | 7 (2) | 23 (3) | 91:181 | 17 |
| 15 | (Slovenia) Bled | 30 | 5 (1) | 25 (0) | 55:189 | 10 |
| 16 | (Italy) HC Courmaosta | 30 | 4 (0) | 26 (2) | 95:208 | 10 |

== Playoffs ==
=== Group phase ===
Group A
| Place | Team | GP | W (OTW) | L (OTL) | GF:GA | Pts |
|---|---|---|---|---|---|---|
| 1 | Italy HC Bozen | 3 | 2 (0) | 1 (1) | 14:8 | 5 |
| 2 | Austria EC VSV | 3 | 2 (0) | 1 (0) | 19:8 | 4 |
| 3 | Italy HC Meran | 3 | 2 (0) | 1 (0) | 12:11 | 4 |
| 4 | Italy WSV Sterzing Broncos | 3 | 0 (0) | 3 (0) | 4:22 | 0 |

Group B
| Place | Team | GP | W (OTW) | L (OTL) | GF:GA | Pts |
|---|---|---|---|---|---|---|
| 1 | Austria VEU Feldkirch | 3 | 2 (0) | 1 (1) | 12:8 | 5 |
| 2 | Austria EC KAC | 3 | 2 (0) | 1 (0) | 10:4 | 4 |
| 3 | Austria Wiener EV | 3 | 1 (0) | 2 (0) | 6:12 | 2 |
| 4 | Slovenia Olimpija | 3 | 1 (1) | 2 (0) | 7:11 | 2 |

=== Final ===
- Game 1 (12. April 1999), HC Bozen – VEU Feldkirch: 0:4
- Game 2 (14. April 1999), VEU Feldkirch – HC Bozen: 6:0
