= Alpenliga =

European ice hockey league

- Most recent season or competition: 1998–99 Alpenliga season
- Sport: ice hockey
- Founded: 1991
- Folded: 1999
- Replaced by: International Ice Hockey League
- Most titles: VEU Feldkirch (4)

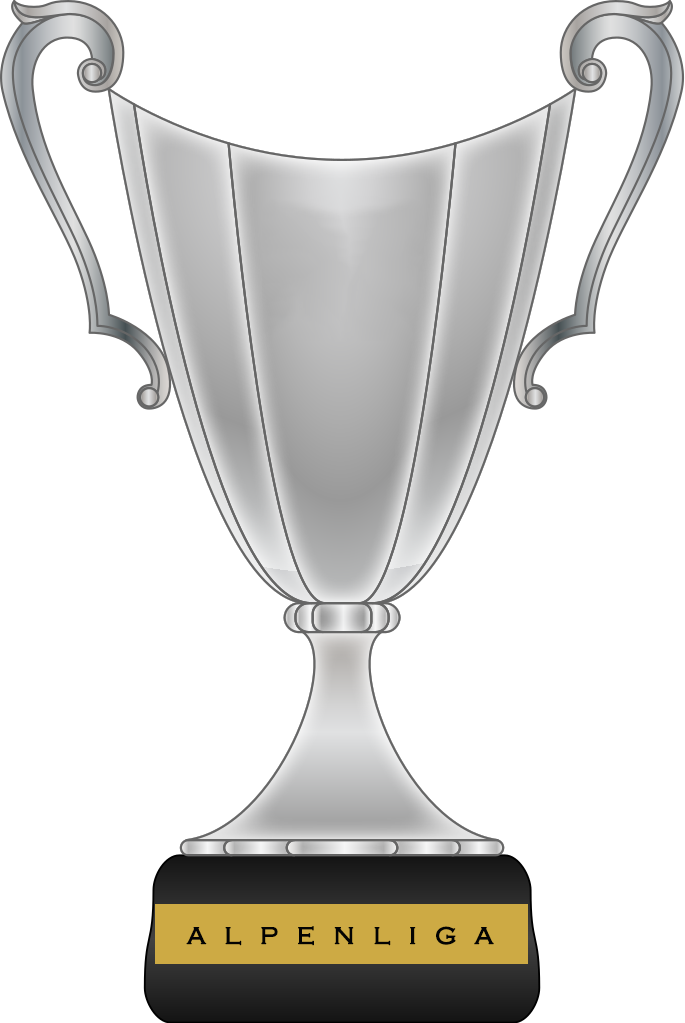
Alpenliga ice hockey cup

The Alpenliga was an international professional ice hockey league which existed between 1991 and 1999. It was contested by club teams from Austria, Italy and Slovenia.

In 1994-95 and 1995–96, the Alpenliga was part of a larger competition called the Six Nations Tournament (sometimes called Europäischer Ligacup or Coupe des Ligues Européennes), which pitted its top teams against members of the Atlantic League, another crossborder loop composed of French, Dutch and Danish clubs.

After 1999, the Alpenliga was replaced with the International Ice Hockey League (often shortened to Interliga), first contested 1999–2000. Eight clubs from Austria, Hungary and Slovenia including, HC Alba Volan, HK Acroni Jesenice, Dunaferr SE, Erste VEU Feldkirch, EC Klagenfurter, HK Olimpija Ljubljana, VSV Villach and WEV Wiener played the first season. The league winners were Villacher SV, and playoff champions were Klagenfurter EC.

After just one season, Austrian teams quit the International Ice Hockey League, and were replaced with Croatian clubs. Yugoslavian, Slovak and Polish organizations also made appearances over the years. The Interliga ceased operations following the 2006–07 season.

== Alpenliga champions ==
- 1991–92 HC Devils Milano, Italy
- 1992–93 HC Alleghe, Italy
- 1993–94 HC Bolzano-Bozen, Italy
- 1994–95 HC Bolzano-Bozen, Italy ^{1}
- 1995–96 VEU Feldkirch, Austria
- 1996–97 VEU Feldkirch, Austria
- 1997–98 VEU Feldkirch, Austria
- 1998–99 VEU Feldkirch, Austria

^{1} Six Nations Tournament

== See also ==
- Interliga
