= 1997–98 Austrian Hockey League season =

Austrian ice hockey season

The 1997–98 Austrian Hockey League season was the 68th season of the Austrian Hockey League, the top level of ice hockey in Austria. Six teams participated in the league, and VEU Feldkirch won the championship.

== Regular season ==
Place	Team	GP	W	T	L	GF–GA	Pts (Bonus)
1	VEU Feldkirch	18	10	3	5	65:46	27 (4)
2	EC KAC	18	10	3	5	74:66	26 (3)
3	EC VSV	18	10	2	6	74:62	23 (1)
4	Wiener EV	18	9	1	8	83:68	21 (2)
5	EC Graz	18	5	1	12	59:87	11 (0)
6	Kapfenberger SV (dropped out)	10	1	0	9	22:48	2 (0)

== Playoffs ==
Semifinals
1	VEU Feldkirch	4
4	Wiener EV	1
2	EC KAC	4
3	EC VSV	1

Final
1	VEU Feldkirch	4
2	EC KAC	1
