= Stefan Pittl =

Austrian ice hockey player

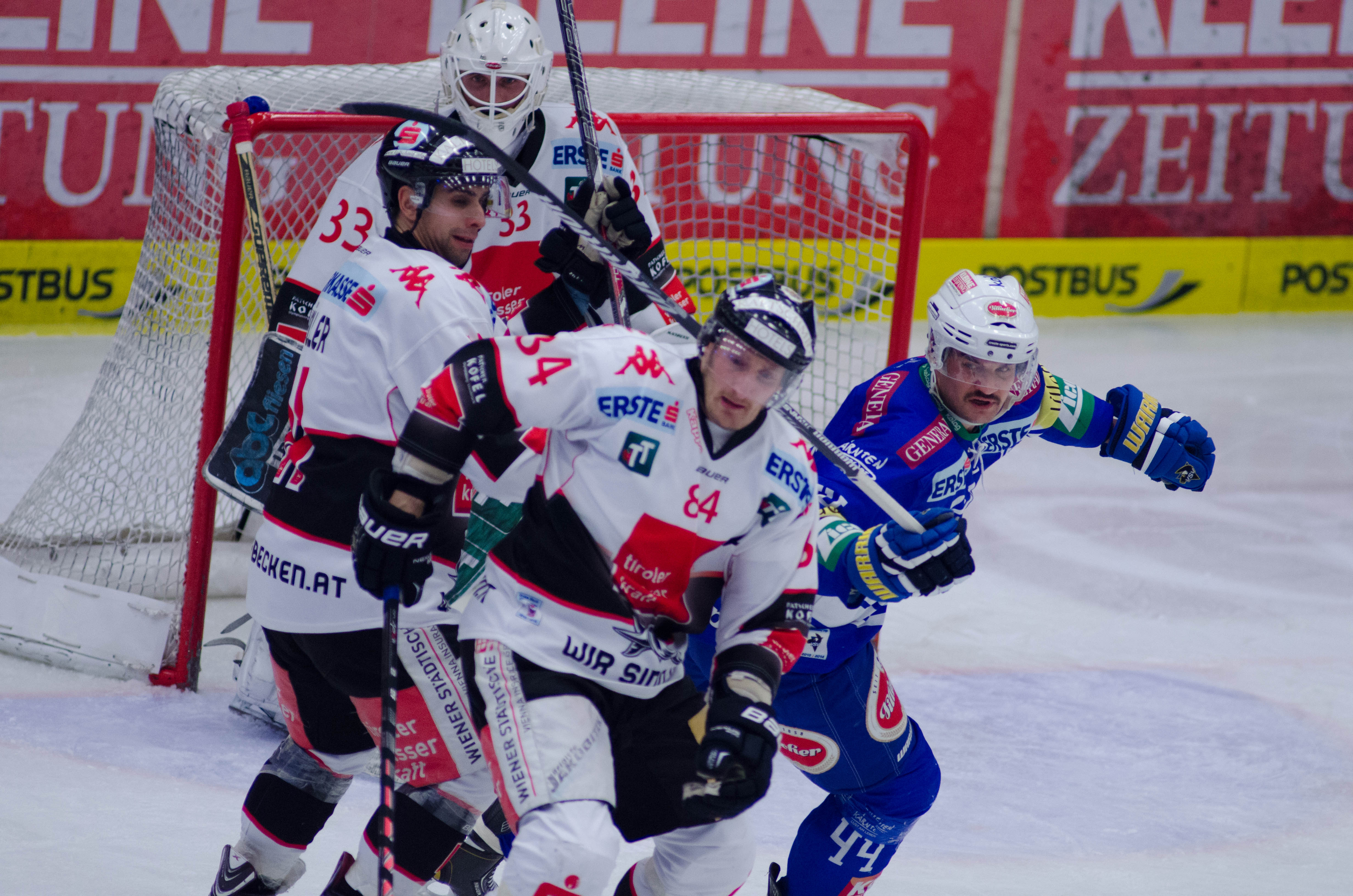
- Born: June 2, 1984 (age 42) Innsbruck, AUT
- Height: 6 ft 1 in (185 cm)
- Weight: 192 lb (87 kg; 13 st 10 lb)
- Position: Defence
- Shot: Left
- Played for: HC TWK Innsbruck; EC Red Bull Salzburg; Graz 99ers EV Zeltweg; EHC Kundl
- Playing career: 2000–2020

Stefan Pittl (born June 2, 1984) is an Austrian professional ice hockey defenceman currently playing EHC Kundl in the lower Austrian league. He joined Kundl after six seasons for HC TWK Innsbruck of the Erste Bank Hockey League.

Pittl began his career with Innsbruck for three seasons before moving to EC Red Bull Salzburg in 2004. He won the Austrian Championship in 2007 with Salzburg. He signed for Graz 99ers in 2007. In 2009 he returned to Innsbruck for a second spell.

== Career statistics ==
			Regular season					Playoffs
Season	Team	League	GP	G	A	Pts	PIM	GP	G	A	Pts	PIM
2000–01	HC Innsbruck	Austria	34	0	4	4	4	—	—	—	—	—
2001–02	HC Innsbruck	Austria	32	0	3	3	16	4	0	0	0	2
2002–03	HC Innsbruck	Austria	40	0	4	4	48	7	0	0	0	2
2003–04	EC Salzburg	Austria2	33	7	24	31	58	—	—	—	—	—
2003–04	EC Salzburg U20	Austria U20	2	2	2	4	4	—	—	—	—	—
2004–05	EC Salzburg	Austria	38	2	0	2	30	—	—	—	—	—
2004–05	EC Salzburg II	Austria2	11	1	2	3	77	—	—	—	—	—
2005–06	EC Salzburg	Austria	47	2	2	4	46	11	0	0	0	33
2005–06	EC Salzburg II	Austria2	1	0	0	0	12	—	—	—	—	—
2006–07	EC Salzburg	Austria	55	0	5	5	30	8	0	0	0	2
2006–07	EC Salzburg II	Austria2	2	0	3	3	6	—	—	—	—	—
2007–08	Graz 99ers	Austria	28	1	1	2	16	—	—	—	—	—
2008–09	Graz 99ers	Austria	30	1	2	3	40	3	0	0	0	2
2008–09	EV Zeltweg	Austria2	8	3	7	10	2	—	—	—	—	—
2009–10	HC Innsbruck	Austria2	32	6	20	26	108	7	1	2	3	8
2010–11	HC Innsbruck	Austria2	33	4	16	20	52	7	1	0	1	4
2011–12	HC Innsbruck	Austria2	32	3	14	17	38	10	3	3	6	4
2012–13	HC Innsbruck	Austria	54	7	10	17	34	—	—	—	—	—
2013–14	HC Innsbruck	Austria	53	6	11	17	28	—	—	—	—	—
2014–15	HC Innsbruck	Austria	53	3	4	7	16	—	—	—	—	—
2015–16	EHC Kundl	Austria4	21	8	16	24	32	5	1	7	8	12
2016–17	EHC Kundl	Austria4	21	6	15	21	59	7	1	5	6	6
2019–20	EHC Kundl	Austria4	10	4	5	9	6	3	1	0	1	4
Austria totals			464	22	46	68	308	33	0	0	0	41
Austria2 totals			152	24	86	110	353	24	5	5	10	16
