= Patrick Mössmer =

Austrian ice hockey player

- Born: 25 October 1982 (age 43) Innsbruck, Austria
- Height: 5 ft 9 in (175 cm)
- Weight: 172 lb (78 kg; 12 st 4 lb)
- Position: Right wing
- Shot: Right
- Played for: HC TWK Innsbruck; Graz 99ers
- National team: Austria
- Playing career: 2000–2017

Patrick Mössmer (born 25 October 1982) is an Austrian former professional ice hockey right winger who most notably played for HC TWK Innsbruck of the Erste Bank Hockey League. He finished his EBEL career, having played in 534 regular season games.

Mössner played for Innsbruck for seven seasons for 2000 to 2007, playing nearly 300 games for them. He joined Graz 99ers in 2007 but after one season, he returned to Innsbruck. He announced the end of his professional player career at the conclusion of the 2016–17 season with Innsbruck, his 16th in total with the club.

== Career statistics ==
			Regular season					Playoffs
Season	Team	League	GP	G	A	Pts	PIM	GP	G	A	Pts	PIM
2000–01	HC Innsbruck	Austria	38	7	13	20	38	—	—	—	—	—
2001–02	HC Innsbruck	Austria	32	10	10	20	45	4	1	3	4	4
2001–02	HC Innsbruck U20	Austria U20	6	5	4	9	4	—	—	—	—	—
2002–03	HC Innsbruck	Austria	34	0	1	1	12	7	1	1	2	2
2003–04	HC Innsbruck	EBEL	45	12	3	15	8	—	—	—	—	—
2004–05	HC Innsbruck	EBEL	44	4	5	9	26	5	2	0	2	2
2005–06	HC Innsbruck	EBEL	47	8	6	14	38	7	0	0	0	37
2006–07	HC Innsbruck	EBEL	47	9	10	19	61	—	—	—	—	—
2007–08	Graz 99ers	EBEL	42	5	8	13	81	—	—	—	—	—
2008–09	HC Innsbruck	EBEL	49	1	2	3	24	6	0	0	0	2
2009–10	HC Innsbruck	Austria2	34	13	31	44	119	7	1	4	5	2
2010–11	HC Innsbruck	Austria2	33	25	30	55	36	8	6	2	8	8
2011–12	HC Innsbruck	Austria2	32	19	20	39	6	10	10	7	17	6
2012–13	HC Innsbruck	EBEL	54	10	9	19	14	—	—	—	—	—
2013–14	HC Innsbruck	EBEL	52	7	10	17	22	—	—	—	—	—
2014–15	HC Innsbruck	EBEL	49	8	9	17	10	—	—	—	—	—
2015–16	HC Innsbruck	EBEL	53	4	7	11	8	—	—	—	—	—
2016–17	HC Innsbruck	EBEL	52	0	0	0	6	4	0	0	0	0
EBEL totals			534	68	69	137	298	22	2	0	2	41
