= Ice hockey in Austria =

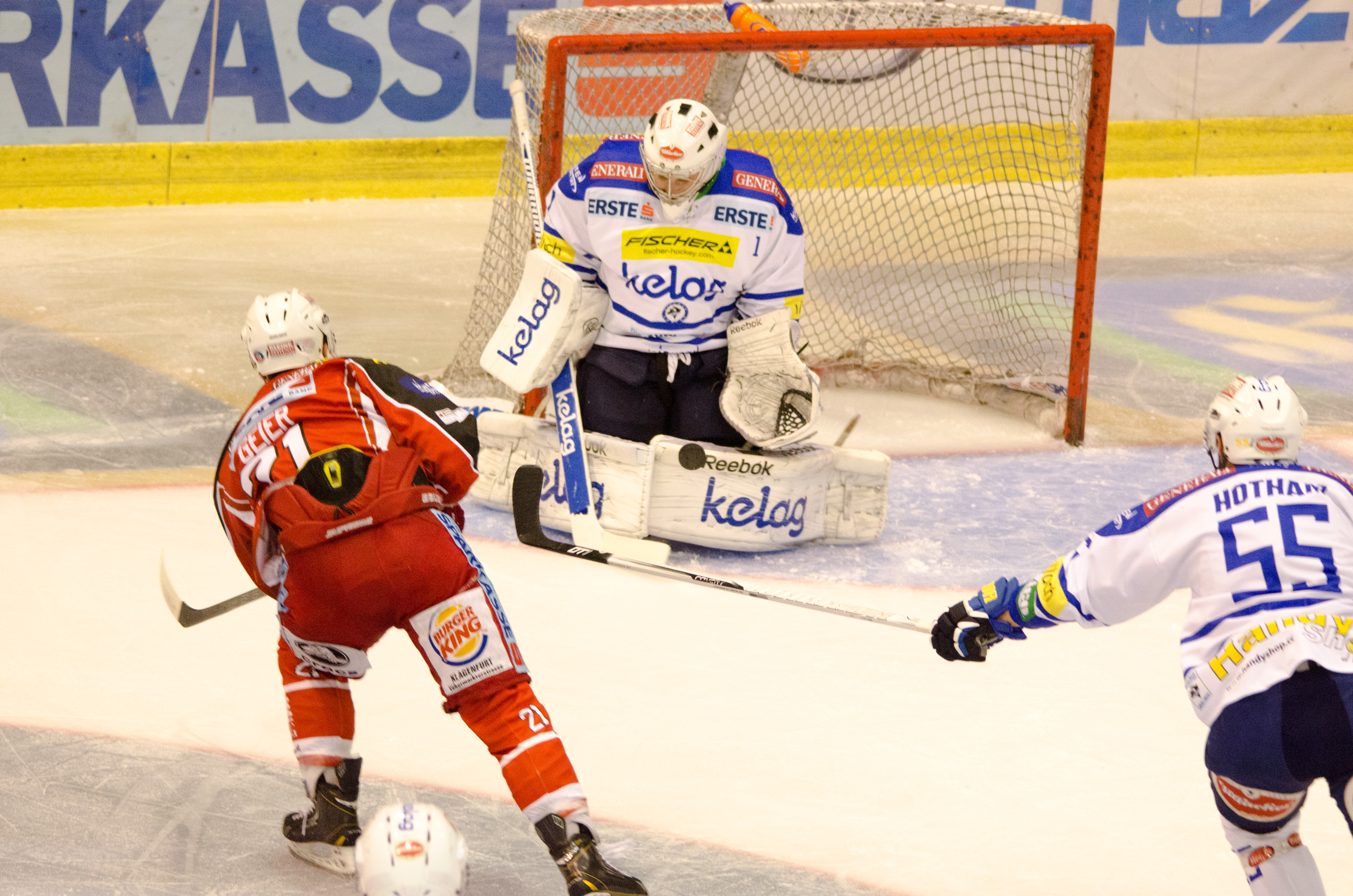
- Austrian Hockey League between KAC and VSV
- Country: Austria
- Governing body: Austrian Ice Hockey Association
- National teams: Men's national team; Women's national team

National competitions
- Austrian Hockey League; Alps Hockey League; Austrian Oberliga

International competitions
- Ice Hockey European Championships; IIHF World Championships; Winter Olympics

Ice hockey in Austria is governed by the Austrian Ice Hockey Association. The Austrian Hockey League was founded in 1922. The second level Nationalliga, and the third level Oberliga operate below it. Austrian men's, women's, junior, and women's U-18 national teams participate at the IIHF World Championships. Austria has been a member of the IIHF since March 18, 1912.

== Hockey at the time of the Austro-Hungarian Monarchy ==
After being reported in 1897 for the first time by ice hockey, only three years later, the Training Ice Club and the Vienna Athletic Sport Club carried the first official game. The game was played at that time with seven men; In addition to the known positions, there was also a so-called rover, who was the best ice skater on the course a kind of all-round player. In 1909, better training conditions were created with the opening of the first artificial ice rink, and the new sport experienced an unprecedented boom in Austria, which at that time was still part of the Austro-Hungary monarchy.

In 1912, the Austrian Ice Hockey Association was founded and added in the same year as a member of the International Ice Hockey Federation. However, this happened a little too late, so Austria-Hungary's first participation in the 1912 European Hockey Championship had to be canceled in retrospect. Only a year later, the monarchy officially participated in the tournament, but finished among the four participants last place.

== International successes after the First World War ==
The First World War interrupted the efforts, and after the disintegration of the monarchy, the Austrian federation had to be re-established in 1919. Only for season 1921/22 was the change from Bandy to Canadian ice hockey with the now-known puck of the association side. After 1921/22 a bandycup was performed, and the bandy championship was canceled in 1922/23 after the game W.B.C against Nicholosen on January 23, 1923. In 1922/23, an Austrian championship was held for the first time, which could be won by the Wiener EV. However, this was in fact a competition limited to the Vienna area, and only gradually did teams from other parts of Austria join.

The end of the twenties brought the greatest success for Austrian hockey. This began in 1927 with the win of the European Championship, where not a single game had been lost. 1930 defeated the Austrian national team as the first European team, from North America: a game against Canada could be won 1-0. In 1931, the European title was brought to Austria again, and at the 1931 World Ice Hockey Championships, the team could achieve third place behind Canada and the United States. 1932 and 1933 followed by two silver medals at the European Championships.

== World War II ==
Before the Second World War there was in Austria the ice hockey of the commoners and those of the workers. Workers 'sport developed very quickly in the 1920s, and in 1928 the first workers' ice hockey clubs were founded. They belonged to the 1919 founded Association of Workers and Soldiers Sports Clubs of Austria (VAS), which renamed itself in 1924 ASKÖ (Workers Association for Sport and Physical Culture in Austria). At the 1931 Workers' Winter Olympiad in Mürzzuschlag occupied the national team of Austrians 1st place and became Olympic champion.

With the ban on the Social Democratic Labor Party in Austria on February 12, 1934, all affiliated hockey clubs were banned. As a result, players of the workers' clubs tried to be included in other ice hockey clubs or to found new clubs in the civic camp. Thus, in December 1934, the Association for Sport and Physical Culture of the Trade Union Confederation was started. So reported the sports Tagblatt on December 20, 1934 about a new ice hockey club Hammerbrotwerke. Also the ice hockey section Arsenal in the trade union federation, which was taken up in January 1935, belongs to it, as well as the ice hockey club Meidling.

The bourgeoisie took no notice of the hockey of the workers. The Sport-Tagblatt reported on January 22, 1934, that the Austrian workers 'ice hockey team participated in the Latvian workers' winter sports festival in Riga on 17 and 18 February 1931. This note has rarity value. The magazine "The Ice Hockey Sport" also reported only once, wondering here about the rapid growth of the hockey worker sports and wished this for their own association.

== German championship titles by Viennese clubs ==
At the end of the thirties the connection to Germany followed. At that time, the ÖEHV no longer existed, instead, some Austrian teams took part in the German league, which meant that the EK Engelmann and the Viennese EV ever won a German championship title in their club's history. During the Second World War, the game operation came to a complete halt. It was not until 1945 that the association was re-founded, and in 1947 the team again conquered the bronze medal at a World Cup.

== Descent into the second division ==
However, it followed a sporting crash, which meant that in 1962 Austria even relegated to the C-Group, but there unbeaten managed the immediate resurgence in the second division. It took until 1992 before the national team made it back to the best nations in the world. Since then, however, there has been a constant ups and downs between the A and B groups.

=== Problems with offspring and finances ===
There were already signs in the last few seasons that the limit of lukrierbaren by sponsors budget was reached, this was mainly due to the withdrawal of the HC Innsbruck from the Bundesliga with the end of the season 2008/09 obvious. The two Slovenian teams reported massive financial problems after this season. Other associations, such as the EC VSV, have been working with smaller budgets for quite some time to avoid the threat of bankruptcy.

An important consideration here is the number of available Austrian players. Above all, the entry of Red Bull as a sponsor of the EC Red Bull Salzburg participant brought difficulties, as the team took a large part of the better athletic native players with extremely generous offers under contract and drove the salaries of Austrian players disproportionately upwards. Since many teams such as the Vienna Capitals, however, have little own offspring, they could not compensate for this by the advancement of younger players. As a result, the legionnaire was relaxed and replaced by a points system, so that the missing Austrian players were replaced by a large number of transfer card players. This in turn was criticized above all by the associations from Carinthia, which represented for decades one of the most important Kaderschmieden in Austria. However, the hoped-for reduction in budgets was limited, as the example of Innsbruck showed. At the moment, a long-term solution can only improve training for young players. Serious efforts in this direction have been around since 2009 and culminated in the meantime for the 2010–11 season in the establishment of a number of farm teams of all Bundesliga teams and increased cooperation with the clubs of the second and third league. Likewise, some youth players were able to establish themselves in better foreign junior leagues.

The next step in 2012 was the founding of the Junior EBEL, a junior league whose participation is compulsory for all Bundesliga teams. This was joined in the premiere year several more teams.

== The gap between national and national league ==
In recent years, a not inconsiderable problem between the two highest leagues developed: the budgets of the Bundesliga clubs have risen so much within a few years that they now amount to many times the financial resources of a second division club. For this reason, no national league champions made long use of his right to rise in the top flight. In most cases, the financial risk of disproportionately higher investments is argued. This is a very important aspect, especially after the temporary exit of HC Innsbruck, which has not left its mark on the formation of the second division. While there is no longer any effective legionnaire restrictions in the Bundesliga, the National League clubs have kept their restrictions on three transfer card players and have increasingly tried to force their own offspring.

In addition, a separation between East and West had developed in Austria. While in Vorarlberg alone four (and with the newly added HC Innsbruck from the neighboring Tyrol five) national league teams existed, the East was dominated mainly by the Bundesliga clubs. The four Vorarlberg teams built in their financial planning, especially on the numerous well-attended Derbies, which are dropped when a rise of a team in the Bundesliga for this. In addition, these teams argued with the long journey for away games in the East. However, this led to the fact that the second-highest division was played over the years almost exclusively in the West, while the Bundesliga and Oberliga took place only in the East. This problem was exacerbated with the growth of the league to Hungary, Slovenia and Croatia and could only be broken in 2012, when with the Dornbirner EC and returnees HC Innsbruck again two clubs from the West in the EBEL ascended. However, this was accompanied by a crisis of existence of the National League, which had to be realigned in the summer of 2012 within a short time.

== National league ==
The highest division of Austrian ice hockey exists in its current form since the season 1965–66. However, the Austrian champions is played with interruptions since 1923. Record champion and at the same time the oldest club in the current field is the EC KAC from Klagenfurt with 30 championship titles.

The Erste Bank Ice Hockey League has developed into an international league over the last few years, with four out of twelve participating teams coming from neighboring countries. Likewise, problems with the legionnaires' regime arose over time, which were changed and liberalized several times, especially on the initiative of the Vienna Capitals. This resulted in a greatly increased number of transfer card players in the league. That this did not serve exclusively to push the high salaries for the comparatively small pool of Austrian players and thus to reduce the budgets, proved the temporary voluntary descent of the EBEL participant from Innsbruck. Also, some other teams have always had financial problems, a long-term solution is currently, however, not yet in sight due to the incompatibility of the demands made by the various teams.

Nevertheless, the league continues to develop and has now established itself among the better European leagues. In the 2009–10 season, the brand was exceeded for the first time by one million spectators, whereby the EBEL overtook the Slovak Extraliga and was in seventh place in this ranking in Europe. In addition, the league was accepted as a full member of the European league club Hockey Europe.

== Previous League ==
For a long time, the National League was regarded as a stable and financially balanced league in which a considerable proportion of the Austrian youth players were trained by the clubs. This changed in the summer of 2009, when several clubs had to file for bankruptcy. After some confusion about whether the National League could be held in the 2009/10 season at all, but still emerged in the end, a solution, but the development of recent years brought to an unsatisfactory endpoint. The two Styrian representatives KSV ice hockey club and EV Zeltweg moved to the Oberliga, which meant that with the newly founded Zeller polar bears (successor of the insolvent EK Zell am See), the easternmost team of the second division was located in Salzburg. The field of participants shrunk in the meantime to only seven clubs with which the league had de facto lost its status as a total Austrian second division and shared this status with the Oberliga. With the rise of the ATSE Graz, however, a new Styrian club joined in 2010. A year later, followed by a number of farm teams of the Bundesliga teams, but the qualitatively fell off against the established clubs.

In the summer of 2012, the EC Dornbirn and HC Innsbruck decided to move up to the Bundesliga, while the EBEL clubs withdrew their farm teams in favor of a Junior EBEL. This development proved fatal for the second highest division. While the Austrian Ice Hockey Association worked to extend the national league to neighboring countries, the Styrian association developed the alternative model of a purely Austrian elite league. In the end, the National League was re-established as an Inter-National League and now also includes Slovenian clubs. In the 2013/14 season, the field of participants widened when in addition five teams of the Italian Hockey League and four other Slovenian teams participated. For the 2014/15 season, the Italian association initially stopped another participation his clubs. A year later, the supranational Alps Hockey League was founded as a successor to the INL by the three hockey associations of Austria, Slovenia and Italy.

== Austria Oberliga ==
After the Oberliga struggled for a long time that more and more teams migrated to the respective leagues, emerged in the summer of 2009 due to the problems in the National League an unexpected boom. The league, which had always acted as a link between the professional and amateur hockey in Austria, was greatly upgraded by the participation of former national team KSV ice hockey club and EV Aicall Zeltweg and was officially still run as the third highest league, but in fact formed together with the National League the second highest performance level. This was based primarily on the strict east-west separation of the two leagues. But while the National League holds on the maximum number of three transfer card players per team, the Oberliga lowered the limit to one and wanted from the 2010/11 season as a purely Austrian league without legionaries get along. When after the 2009/10 season some teams left the league, were increasingly called by the Bundesliga teams farm teams to life, bringing the league had the status of a training league. However, the farm teams changed after only one year in the national league, and the game operation of the league had to be set.

2018 was introduced with the Austrian Amateur Hockey League (ÖAHL), a new nationwide third division.

== National team ==
After the men's national team had been able to hold their own for a few years in the lower regions of the top division, the beginning of the 21st century saw a constant ups and downs between the top 16 nations and Division I. Most recently, the team rose to the top of the ice hockey team. World Cup 2009 in Switzerland. Although this only happened because the actually worse placed Germans were set for the 2010 World Cup in their own country, the consequences were drawn from it, although here the association and the Bundesliga could not first agree on the responsibilities. Lars Bergström was replaced as coach of the team of Bill Gilligan, who for the first time was not given the requirement, as soon as possible to ascend again. Instead, an attempt should be made to build up a new team over the next few years by intensifying the involvement of the youth players and to make their way into the 21st century. The latter was not possible by outdated structures. The re-emergence in the A group succeeded nevertheless, with which Austria again competed in the top group at the 2011 World Cup.

The situation is similar with the men's junior teams. The U-20 national team made it to the top division at the World Cup 2009 Division Aalborg (Denmark) with four wins and only one overtime defeat, but rose again the following year after an inferior performance from. The same applies to the U18 national team, which in 2010 even had to relegate to Division II.

The women's national team showed good performance at the World Cup Division I in Graz, but missed the rise but still clearly. The U-18 team landed at the tournament of Division I in France, however, on the penultimate place.

Overall, the Austrian Ice Hockey Federation rates the performances as rather mixed. Above all, the senior men's team recently proved that in the training methods and the player selection crucial changes must be made. However, the fans and the media are particularly critical of the fact that Bill Gilligan has once again been assigned a coach whose main focus is on a club team, the EC Graz 99ers, rather than looking for a coach who focuses on developing the national team can.

For the ladies, the latest developments show that the path taken bears fruit, although there is still the fundamental problem that women's ice hockey in Austria is a pure amateur sport. However, this problem is shared with many European nations.

== Literature ==
- Margreiter, Haiszan, Kilias: Das Grosse Österreichische Eishockey-Buch, Verlag Buch Spezial Dornbirn, ISBN 3-900496-04-4
- OMR. Dr. Hellmuth Reichel: KAC - Eishockey erobert eine Stadt!, Herausgeber: Klagenfurter Athletiksport Club, Klagenfurt, 1995
- Vereinsbroschüre: 75 Jahre KAC, 1909-1984, Herausgeber: Klagenfurter Athletiksport Club, Klagenfurt, 1984
