= Austrian champions (ice hockey) =

The Austrian ice hockey championship (in German: Österreichische Eishockey-Meister) has been awarded to men since 1923, and for women since 1999.

== Women's ==
First Division
Year	Champion
1999	Gipsy Girls Villach
2000	Gipsy Girls Villach
2001	Vienna Flyers
2002	EHV Sabres Wien
2003	EHV Sabres Wien
2004	EHV Sabres Wien
2005	EHV Sabres Wien
2006	EC The Ravens Salzburg
2007	Gipsy Girls Villach
2008	EHV Sabres Wien
2009	EC The Ravens Salzburg
2010	EHV Sabres Wien
2011	EHV Sabres Wien
2012	EHV Sabres Wien
2013	EHV Sabres Wien
2014	EHV Sabres Wien
2015	EHV Sabres Wien
2016	EHV Sabres Wien
2017	EHV Sabres Wien
2018	EHV Sabres Wien
2019	EHV Sabres Wien
2020	Championship canceled
2021	EHV Sabres Wien
2022	EHV Sabres Wien
2023	Neuberg Highlanders
2024	EC Graz
2025	SKN Sabres Sankt Pölten

== Men's ==
First Division		Second Division	
Year	Champion	Year	Champion
1923	Wiener Eislauf-Verein		
1924	Championship canceled		
1925	Wiener Eislauf-Verein		
1926	Wiener Eislauf-Verein		
1927	Wiener Eislauf-Verein		
1928	Wiener Eislauf-Verein		
1929	Wiener Eislauf-Verein		
1930	Wiener Eislauf-Verein		
1931	Wiener Eislauf-Verein		
1932	Pötzleinsdorfer SK		
1933	Wiener Eislauf-Verein		
1934	EC KAC		
1935	EC KAC		
1936	EK Engelmann		
1937	Wiener Eislauf-Verein		
1938	EK Engelmann		
1939 - 1945	Cancelled due to World War II		
1946	EK Engelmann		
1947	Wiener Eislauf-Verein		
1948	Wiener Eislauf-Verein		
1949	Wiener Eissport-Gemeinschaft		
1950	Wiener Eissport-Gemeinschaft		
1951	Wiener Eissport-Gemeinschaft		
1952	EC KAC		
1953	Innsbrucker EV		
1954	Innsbrucker EV		
1955	EC KAC		
1956	EK Engelmann		
1957	EK Engelmann		
1958	Innsbrucker EV		
1959	Innsbrucker EV		
1960	EC KAC	1960	East: Wiener Eislauf-Verein, West: EK Zell am See
1961	Innsbrucker EV	1961	EK Zell am See
1962	Wiener Eislauf-Verein	1962	East: ASKÖ Wien, WAT X, West: SV Ehrwald, South: ATSE Graz
1963	Innsbrucker EV	1963	ATSE Graz
1964	EC KAC	1964	Salzburger EV
1965	EC KAC	1965	EC Innsbruck
1966	EC KAC	1966	A: ATSE Graz, B: ASKÖ Wien
1967	EC KAC	1967	A: VEU Feldkirch
1968	EC KAC	1968	EC Ehrwald
1969	EC KAC	1969	EC Innsbruck
1970	EC KAC	1970	Grazer AK
1971	EC KAC	1971	East: WAT Stadlau, West: EC Innsbruck
1972	EC KAC	1972	East: Kapfenberger SV, West: HC Salzburg
1973	EC KAC	1973	Kapfenberger SV
1974	EC KAC	1974	EHC Lustenau
1975	ATSE Graz	1975	EK Zell am See
1976	EC KAC	1976	EC VSV
1977	EC KAC	1977	EC VSV
1978	ATSE Graz	1978	EHC Lustenau
1979	EC KAC	1979	EK Zell am See
1980	EC KAC	1980	WAT Stadlau
1981	EC VSV	1981	ATSE Graz
1982	VEU Feldkirch	1982	EHC Lustenau
1983	VEU Feldkirch	1983	Grazer SV
1984	VEU Feldkirch	1984	EHC Lustenau
1985	EC KAC	1985	Wiener Eislauf-Verein
1986	EC KAC	1986	EK Zell am See
1987	EC KAC	1987	UEC Mödling
1988	EC KAC	1988	Kapfenberger SV
1989	GEV Innsbruck	1989	Kapfenberger SV
1990	VEU Feldkirch	1990	EK Zell am See
1991	EC KAC	1991	EK Zell am See
1992	EC VSV	1992	EHC Lustenau
1993	EC VSV	1993	EC Ehrwald
1994	VEU Feldkirch	1994	EV Innsbruck
1995	VEU Feldkirch	1995	Championship not held
1996	VEU Feldkirch	1996	Championship not held
1997	VEU Feldkirch	1997	EHC Lustenau
1998	VEU Feldkirch	1998	DEK Klagenfurt
1999	EC VSV	1999	Kapfenberger SV
2000	EC KAC	2000	EC Graz 99ers
2001	EC KAC	2001	Championship not held
2002	EC VSV	2002	VEU Feldkirch
2003	EHC Black Wings Linz	2003	EK Zell am See
2004	EC KAC	2004	EC Red Bull Salzburg
2005	Vienna Capitals	2005	EK Zell am See
2006	EC VSV	2006	EHC Lustenau
2007	EC Red Bull Salzburg	2007	VEU Feldkirch
2008	EC Red Bull Salzburg	2008	EC Dornbirn
2009	EC KAC	2009	EHC Lustenau
2010	EC Red Bull Salzburg	2010	EC Dornbirn
2011	EC Red Bull Salzburg	2011	VEU Feldkirch
2012	EHC Black Wings Linz	2012	HC Innsbruck
2013	EC KAC	2013	EHC Bregenzerwald
2014	EC Red Bull Salzburg	2014	EHC Bregenzerwald
2015	EC Red Bull Salzburg	2015	EHC Lustenau
2016	EC Red Bull Salzburg	2016	EHC Bregenzerwald
2017	Vienna Capitals	2017	VEU Feldkirch
2018	EC Red Bull Salzburg	2018	VEU Feldkirch
2019	EC KAC	2019	RB Hockey Juniors
2020	Championship canceled	2020	RB Hockey Juniors
2021	EC KAC	2021	EHC Lustenau
2022	EC Red Bull Salzburg	2022	EHC Bregenzerwald
2023	EC Red Bull Salzburg	2023	EK Zell am See
2024	EC Red Bull Salzburg	2024	RB Hockey Juniors
2025	EC Red Bull Salzburg	2025	EC Kitzbühel

== See also ==
- Austrian Hockey League (Österreichische Eishockey-Liga)
- Austria women's ice hockey Bundesliga (Dameneishockey-Bundesliga)
- List of German ice hockey champions
