= 2007–08 Austrian National League season =

The 2007–08 Austrian National League season was contested by nine teams, and saw EC-TREND Dornbirn win the championship. The top eight teams from the regular season qualified for the playoffs.

== Regular season ==
Place	Team	GP	W (OT/SO W)	L (OT/SO L)	Goals	Pts
1.	EC-TREND Dornbirn	32	24 (4)	8 (2)	165:109	50
2.	EHC Lustenau	32	23 (3)	9 (1)	175:110	47
3.	EC Red Bull Salzburg 2	32	20 (2)	12 (2)	152:107	42
4.	EK Zell am See	32	18 (2)	14 (3)	138:119	39
5.	VEU Feldkirch	32	18 (4)	14 (3)	106:101	39
6.	KSV Kapfenberg	32	15 (1)	17 (4)	111:116	34
6.	EV Zeltweg	32	16 (3)	16 (0)	133:124	32
8.	EHC Team Wien	32	7 (0)	25 (4)	79:132	18
9.	EHC Bregenzerwald	32	3 (2)	29 (2)	63:204	8

== Playoffs ==
Quarterfinals
1	EC Dornbirn	3
8	EHC Team Wien	0
4	VEU Feldkirch	3
5	EK Zell am See	1
2	EHC Lustenau	3
7	KSV Kapfenberg	0
3	Red Bull Salzburg 2	3
6	EV Zeltweg	2

Semifinals
1	EC Dornbirn	3
4	VEU Feldkirch	2
2	EHC Lustenau	1
3	Red Bull Salzburg 2	3

Finals
1	EC Dornbirn	3
3	Red Bull Salzburg 2	1
