= Daniel Gauthier =

Canadian ice hockey player

- Born: May 17, 1970 (age 56) Charlemagne, Quebec, Canada
- Height: 6 ft 2 in (188 cm)
- Weight: 192 lb (87 kg; 13 st 10 lb)
- Position: Centre
- Shot: Left
- Played for: VEU Feldkirch; EC VSV; Asiago; SC Langnau; Wedemark Scorpions; Frankfurt Lions; Chicago Blackhawks
- NHL draft: 62nd overall, 1988; Pittsburgh Penguins
- Playing career: 1990–2012

Daniel Gauthier (born May 17, 1970) is a Canadian former ice hockey centre. He played 5 games in the National Hockey League (NHL) with the Chicago Blackhawks during the 1994–95 season. The rest of his career, which lasted from 1990 to 2012, was mainly spent in European leagues.

== Playing career ==
Gauthier was drafted 62nd overall by the Pittsburgh Penguins in the 1988 NHL entry draft. He turned pro in 1990 in the International Hockey League with the Albany Choppers for one game before joining the ECHL's Knoxville Cherokees, scoring 41 goals and 93 assists for 134 points. In his rookie season Gauthier was named to the 1990–91 ECHL First All-Star Team and also won the John A. Daley Trophy as the ECHL's Rookie of the Year.

He then had spells in the IHL for the Muskegon Lumberjacks and later the Cleveland Lumberjacks following their relocation. In 1993, Gauthier signed with the Florida Panthers as a free agent, but was assigned to the IHL's Cincinnati Cyclones and never played for the Panthers. A year later he became a free agent once more and signed with the Chicago Blackhawks. He was initially assigned to the IHL's Indianapolis Ice, but eventually played 5 NHL games during the 1994–95 season but scored no points.

After splitting the 1995–96 season with the Ice and the Peoria Rivermen, Gauthier moved to Europe. Brief spells in the Deutsche Eishockey Liga with the Frankfurt Lions and the Wedemark Scorpions were followed by a move to the Austrian Hockey League with VEU Feldkirch. After three seasons, Gauthier moved to the Swiss Nationalliga A and joined SCL Tigers for another three years. He then rejoined Feldkirch in another three season spell before moving to Italy's Serie A, joining HC Asiago. He returned to Austria and signed for EC VSV. In 2008, Gauthier returned to North America and played in the Ligue Nord-Américaine de Hockey (LNAH) with spells for the Saint-Hyacinthe Top Design and the Saguenay 98.3 before returning to Feldkirch once more.

== Post-playing career ==
In September 2022, Gauthier was named as the head coach of the Bâtisseurs de Montcalm of the LNAH, an expansion team in their first season, after having previously coached at the junior hockey level.

== Family ==
His son, Danick Gauthier (born October 24, 1991) also was a professional hockey player.

== Career statistics ==
=== Regular season and playoffs ===
			Regular season					Playoffs
Season	Team	League	GP	G	A	Pts	PIM	GP	G	A	Pts	PIM
1985–86	Laval-Laurentides-Lanaudière Régents	QMAAA	30	4	9	13	14	8	7	5	12	8
1986–87	Longueuil Chevaliers	QMJHL	64	23	22	45	23	18	4	5	9	15
1986–87	Longueuil Chevaliers	M-Cup	—	—	—	—	—	3	0	0	0	2
1987–88	Victoriaville Tigres	QMJHL	66	43	47	90	53	5	2	1	3	0
1988–89	Victoriaville Tigres	QMJHL	64	41	75	116	84	16	12	17	29	30
1989–90	Victoriaville Tigres	QMJHL	62	45	69	114	32	16	8	19	27	16
1990–91	Knoxville Cherokees	ECHL	63	41	93	134	44	2	0	4	4	4
1990–91	Albany Choppers	IHL	1	1	0	1	0	—	—	—	—	—
1991–92	Muskegon Lumberjacks	IHL	72	21	20	41	42	9	3	6	9	8
1992–93	Cleveland Lumberjacks	IHL	84	42	68	110	102	4	2	2	4	14
1993–94	Cincinnati Cyclones	IHL	84	32	37	69	115	10	2	3	5	14
1994–95	Chicago Blackhawks	NHL	5	0	0	0	0	—	—	—	—	—
1994–95	Indianapolis Ice	IHL	66	22	50	72	53	—	—	—	—	—
1995–96	Indianapolis Ice	IHL	70	28	39	67	44	—	—	—	—	—
1995–96	Peoria Rivermen	IHL	10	3	5	8	10	11	4	6	10	6
1996–97	Frankfurt Lions	DEL	8	1	0	1	6	—	—	—	—	—
1996–97	Wedemark Scorpions	DEL	2	1	0	1	0	—	—	—	—	—
1996–97	VEU Feldkirch	AUT	51	19	34	53	38	—	—	—	—	—
1997–98	VEU Feldkirch	AUT	42	11	32	43	43	—	—	—	—	—
1998–99	VEU Feldkirch	AUT	45	28	35	63	32	—	—	—	—	—
1999–00	SC Langnau	NLA	45	13	22	35	32	—	—	—	—	—
2000–01	SC Langnau	NLA	39	21	24	45	68	—	—	—	—	—
2001–02	SC Langnau	NLA	26	9	11	20	4	—	—	—	—	—
2001–02	VEU Feldkirch	AUT-2	8	12	18	30	8	—	—	—	—	—
2002–03	VEU Feldkirch	AUT	45	25	32	57	38	3	0	1	1	33
2003–04	VEU Feldkirch	EBEL	32	16	13	29	28	—	—	—	—	—
2004–05	Asiago	ITA	21	3	20	23	6	—	—	—	—	—
2004–05	EC VSV	EBEL	16	8	7	15	2	3	1	1	2	10
2004–05	EC Dornbirn	AUT-2	1	3	1	4	4	—	—	—	—	—
2005–06	EC VSV	EBEL	48	20	52	72	24	1	0	0	0	0
2006–07	EC VSV	EBEL	50	18	46	64	64	5	3	1	4	12
2007–08	EC VSV	EBEL	31	7	17	24	20	5	0	3	3	8
2008–09	Saint-Hyacinthe Chiefs	LNAH	3	0	2	2	0	—	—	—	—	—
2008–09	98.3 FM de Saguenay	LNAH	22	7	23	30	10	—	—	—	—	—
2008–09	VEU Feldkirch	AUT-2	5	4	10	14	2	8	9	10	19	16
2009–10	Marquis de Saguenay	LNAH	43	17	40	57	32	12	5	12	17	16
2010–11	VEU Feldkirch	AUT-2	28	11	38	49	60	12	5	10	15	20
2011–12	VEU Feldkirch	AUT-2	29	11	35	46	30	9	5	6	11	2
AUT/EBEL totals			357	152	268	420	289	17	4	6	10	63
NHL totals			5	0	0	0	0	—	—	—	—	—
