= Todd Elik =

Canadian ice hockey player (born 1966)

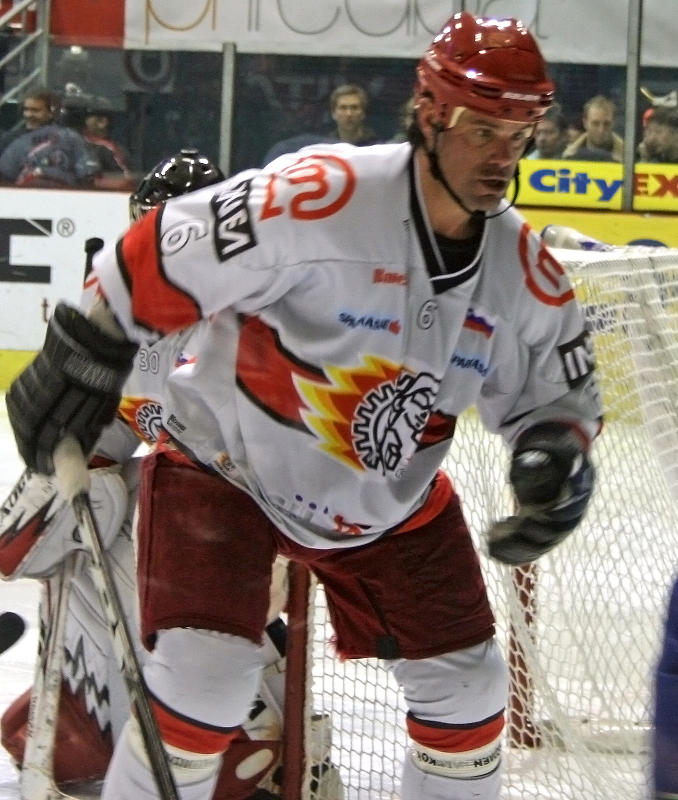
- Born: April 15, 1966 (age 59) Brampton, Ontario, Canada
- Height: 6 ft 2 in (188 cm)
- Weight: 194 lb (88 kg; 13 st 12 lb)
- Position: Centre
- Shot: Left
- Played for: Los Angeles Kings; Minnesota North Stars; Edmonton Oilers; San Jose Sharks; St. Louis Blues; Boston Bruins; HC Lugano; EV Zug; HC Davos; SCL Tigers; Innsbruck EV; HDD Olimpija Ljubljana; HK Acroni Jesenice
- NHL draft: Undrafted
- Playing career: 1987–2010

Todd Sloan Elik (born April 15, 1966) is a Canadian former professional ice hockey centre who played eight seasons in the National Hockey League (NHL) between 1989 and 1997. After leaving the NHL he spent several years in Europe, retiring in 2010.

== Biography ==
Elik grew up in Bolton, Ontario and played Midget hockey with the St. Michael's Midgets. He was granted a walk-on try out with the OHL's Kingston Canadians in 1983 and made the club.

Elik played three seasons in the Ontario Hockey League with the Kingston Canadians and North Bay Centennials before turning professional. He made his pro debut with the International Hockey League's Colorado Rangers, and he scored 100 points (44 goals and 56 assists) in his first season.

Elik made his NHL debut with the Kings in the 1989–90 season. In a season and a half with the Kings, Elik scored 31 goals and added 60 assists. The Minnesota North Stars acquired Elik before the 1991–92 season, giving up Randy Gilhen, Jim Thomson, and a fourth-round draft pick (which became Alexei Zhitnik) for him.

After a season and a half with Minnesota, Elik joined the Edmonton Oilers. After playing in 18 games with the Oilers, Elik was placed on waivers and claimed by the San Jose Sharks. In the 1993–94 season, he scored 25 goals and added 41 assists for the Sharks.

After a brief stint with the St. Louis Blues and two seasons with the Boston Bruins organization, Elik left North America to play professionally in Europe. He played for seven seasons in Switzerland's Nationalliga A and, in the 2005–06, 2006–2007 seasons, he went to Austria to play for Innsbruck EV. On December 13, 2007, Elik signed to play for HDD Olimpija Ljubljana, a Slovenian team playing in the Erste Bank Hockey League. He is signed to play for Tilia Olimpija also in 2008–09. He joined on 30 January 2009 from Slovenian capital city Ljubljana club HDD Olimpija Ljubljana of the Erste Bank Hockey League to SCL Tigers.

Elik appeared in 448 NHL games in his career, scoring 111 goals and adding 218 assists. He also appeared in 52 Stanley Cup playoff games, scoring 15 goals and recording 27 assists.

== Career statistics ==
=== Regular season and playoffs ===
			Regular season					Playoffs
Season	Team	League	GP	G	A	Pts	PIM	GP	G	A	Pts	PIM
1982–83	St. Michael's Buzzers	MJBHL	35	25	26	51	55	—	—	—	—	—
1983–84	Kingston Canadiens	OHL	64	5	16	21	17	—	—	—	—	—
1984–85	Kingston Canadiens	OHL	34	14	11	25	6	—	—	—	—	—
1984–85	North Bay Centennials	OHL	23	4	6	10	2	4	2	0	2	0
1985–86	North Bay Centennials	OHL	40	12	34	46	20	10	7	6	13	0
1986–87	University of Regina	CIAU	27	26	34	60	137	—	—	—	—	—
1986–87	Canadian National Team	Intl	1	0	0	0	0	—	—	—	—	—
1987–88	Colorado Rangers	IHL	81	44	56	100	83	12	8	12	20	9
1988–89	Denver Rangers	IHL	28	20	15	35	22	—	—	—	—	—
1988–89	New Haven Nighthawks	AHL	43	11	25	36	31	17	10	12	22	44
1989–90	Los Angeles Kings	NHL	48	10	23	33	41	10	3	9	12	10
1989–90	New Haven Nighthawks	AHL	32	20	23	43	42	—	—	—	—	—
1990–91	Los Angeles Kings	NHL	74	21	37	58	58	12	2	7	9	6
1991–92	Minnesota North Stars	NHL	62	15	31	46	125	5	1	1	2	2
1992–93	Minnesota North Stars	NHL	46	13	18	31	48	—	—	—	—	—
1992–93	Edmonton Oilers	NHL	14	1	9	10	8	—	—	—	—	—
1993–94	Edmonton Oilers	NHL	4	0	0	0	6	—	—	—	—	—
1993–94	San Jose Sharks	NHL	75	25	41	66	89	14	5	5	10	12
1994–95	San Jose Sharks	NHL	22	7	10	17	18	—	—	—	—	—
1994–95	St. Louis Blues	NHL	13	2	4	6	4	7	4	3	7	2
1995–96	Boston Bruins	NHL	59	13	33	46	40	4	0	2	2	16
1995–96	Providence Bruins	AHL	7	2	7	9	10	—	—	—	—	—
1996–97	Boston Bruins	NHL	31	4	12	16	16	—	—	—	—	—
1996–97	Providence Bruins	AHL	37	16	29	45	63	10	1	6	7	33
1997–98	HC Lugano	NLA	39	30	36	66	222	7	6	5	11	12
1998–99	SC Langnau	NLA	36	14	46	60	169	—	—	—	—	—
1999–00	SC LAngnau	NLA	41	19	35	54	176	—	—	—	—	—
1999–00	Canadian National Team	Intl	4	4	0	4	0	—	—	—	—	—
2000–01	EV Zug	NLA	37	16	42	58	140	3	2	1	3	16
2001–02	EV Zug	NLA	41	16	36	52	104	2	0	2	2	4
2002–03	SC Langnau	NLA	39	13	35	48	193	—	—	—	—	—
2003–04	SC Langnau	NLA	3	1	2	3	2	—	—	—	—	—
2003–04	HC Davos	NLA	37	15	35	50	70	6	1	2	3	48
2004–05	SC Langnau	NLA	12	9	17	26	24	9	3	12	15	52
2005–06	HC Innsbruck	EBEL	48	21	53	74	150	7	1	9	10	18
2006–07	HC Innsbruck	EBEL	53	21	77	98	182	—	—	—	—	—
2007–08	HDD Olimpija Ljubljana	EBEL	8	6	9	15	6	14	3	15	18	56
2007–08	HDD Olimpija Ljubljana	SLO	—	—	—	—	—	6	2	3	5	46
2008–09	HDD Olimpija Ljubljana	EBEL	43	12	35	47	76	—	—	—	—	—
2008–-9	SC Langnau	NLA	6	1	6	7	8	—	—	—	—	—
2009–10	HC Thurgau	NLB	13	7	11	18	40	—	—	—	—	—
2009–10	HK Jesenice	EBEL	29	4	33	37	82	—	—	—	—	—
2009–10	HK Jesenice	SLO	3	1	4	5	8	6	3	8	11	22
2010–11	ATSE Graz	AUT-2	14	2	14	16	26	—	—	—	—	—
NHL totals			448	111	218	329	453	52	15	27	42	48
