= Kent Salfi =

American ice hockey player (born 1971)

- Born: June 10, 1971 (age 53); Camden, NJ, USA
- Height: 5 ft 10 in (178 cm)
- Weight: 181 lb (82 kg; 12 st 13 lb)
- Position: Centre
- Shot: Left
- Played for: EC VSV; Asiago; EHC Black Wings Linz; HC TWK Innsbruck
- National team: Austria
- Playing career: 1993–2010

Kent Salfi (born July 10, 1971) is a retired American-born Austrian ice hockey player who last played for HC TWK Innsbruck of the Austrian Hockey League.

== Career ==
After spending four seasons in the University of Maine, Salfi played in Sweden for Mora IK where he spent two seasons. He then moved to ETC Timmendorfer Strand of Germany's 2nd Bundesliga for one season before moving to Austria and signed with EC VSV in 1996. In 1997 he had a brief spell in Italy's Serie A with Asiago, playing just three games for them before returning to VSV. He remained with the team until 2003 when he joined EHC Black Wings Linz. In 2008, Salfi joined HC TWK Innsbruck.

On 23 August 2010, Salfi announced his official retirement.

== International career ==
Salfi became a naturalised Austrian citizen and represented the Austrian national team in the 2002 Winter Olympics. He also played in the 2002 IIHF World Championship and the 2003 IIHF World Championship.

== Career statistics ==
| | | | Regular season | | | | | Playoffs |
| Season | Team | League | GP | G | A | Pts | PIM | GP | G | A | Pts | PIM |
|---|---|---|---|---|---|---|---|---|---|---|---|---|
| 1989–90 | University of Maine | NCAA | 37 | 6 | 10 | 16 | 21 | — | — | — | — | — |
| 1990–91 | University of Maine | NCAA | 32 | 6 | 7 | 13 | 12 | — | — | — | — | — |
| 1991–92 | University of Maine | NCAA | 33 | 12 | 10 | 22 | 4 | — | — | — | — | — |
| 1992–93 | University of Maine | NCAA | 33 | 10 | 13 | 23 | 24 | — | — | — | — | — |
| 1993–94 | Olofströms IK | Division 2 | 33 | 36 | 36 | 72 | 54 | — | — | — | — | — |
| 1994–95 | Mora IK | Division 1 | 34 | 14 | 12 | 26 | 51 | — | — | — | — | — |
| 1995–96 | ETC Timmendorfer Strand | Germany2 | 34 | 40 | 39 | 79 | 24 | — | — | — | — | — |
| 1996–97 | Villacher SV | Austria | 48 | 26 | 34 | 60 | 93 | — | — | — | — | — |
| 1997–98 | Villacher SV | Austria | 39 | 22 | 34 | 56 | 68 | — | — | — | — | — |
| 1997–98 | HC Asiago | Italy | 3 | 1 | 2 | 3 | 4 | — | — | — | — | — |
| 1998–99 | Villacher SV | Austria | 55 | 29 | 46 | 75 | 85 | — | — | — | — | — |
| 1999–00 | Villacher SV | IEL | 33 | 23 | 34 | 57 | 28 | — | — | — | — | — |
| 1999–00 | Villacher SV | Austria | 3 | 0 | 2 | 2 | 16 | — | — | — | — | — |
| 2000–01 | Villacher SV | Austria | 46 | 34 | 52 | 86 | 52 | — | — | — | — | — |
| 2001–02 | Villacher SV | Austria | 30 | 18 | 20 | 38 | 24 | 16 | 6 | 9 | 15 | 6 |
| 2002–03 | Villacher SV | Austria | 41 | 16 | 20 | 36 | 65 | 13 | 6 | 8 | 14 | 2 |
| 2003–04 | EHC Linz | EBEL | 48 | 21 | 27 | 48 | 34 | 3 | 0 | 2 | 2 | 2 |
| 2004–05 | EHC Linz | EBEL | 45 | 16 | 30 | 46 | 34 | — | — | — | — | — |
| 2005–06 | EHC Linz | EBEL | 38 | 9 | 20 | 29 | 54 | — | — | — | — | — |
| 2006–07 | EHC Linz | EBEL | 49 | 6 | 17 | 23 | 79 | 3 | 0 | 1 | 1 | 2 |
| 2007–08 | EHC Linz | EBEL | 37 | 1 | 6 | 7 | 44 | 8 | 0 | 0 | 0 | 8 |
| 2008–09 | HC Innsbruck | Austria | 48 | 7 | 15 | 22 | 50 | 5 | 0 | 2 | 2 | 16 |
| 2009–10 | HC Innsbruck | Austria2 | 36 | 22 | 32 | 54 | 77 | 5 | 0 | 3 | 3 | 29 |
| Austria totals | | | 262 | 145 | 208 | 353 | 403 | 29 | 12 | 17 | 29 | 8 |
| EBEL totals | | | 265 | 60 | 115 | 175 | 295 | 19 | 0 | 5 | 5 | 28 |
