= Rémi Royer =

Canadian ice hockey player

- Born: February 12, 1978 (age 48) Donnacona, Quebec, Canada
- Height: 6 ft 2 in (188 cm)
- Weight: 200 lb (91 kg; 14 st 4 lb)
- Position: Defence
- Shot: Right
- Played for: Chicago Blackhawks; Briançon; EC Salzburg
- NHL draft: 31st overall, 1996; Chicago Blackhawks
- Playing career: 1998–2012

Rémi Royer (born February 12, 1978) is a Canadian former professional ice hockey defenceman. He played 18 games in the National Hockey League with the Chicago Blackhawks during the 1998–99 season. The rest of his career, which lasted from 1996 to 2012, was spent in the minor leagues and then in Europe.

== Biography ==
Royer was born in Donnacona, Quebec. As a youth, he played in the 1992 Quebec International Pee-Wee Hockey Tournament with a minor ice hockey team from Sainte-Foy, Quebec City.

Royer was drafted 31st overall by the Blackhawks in the 1996 NHL entry draft. He played 18 games in the National Hockey League for the Chicago Blackhawks. He scored no points, but collected 67 penalty minutes. He later played for EC Red Bull Salzburg, HDD Olimpija Ljubljana, and Rivière-du-Loup CIMT in the Ligue Nord-Américaine de Hockey.

== Career statistics ==
=== Regular season and playoffs ===
			Regular season					Playoffs
Season	Team	League	GP	G	A	Pts	PIM	GP	G	A	Pts	PIM
1993–94	Ste-Foy Gouverneurs	QMAAA	44	8	24	32	86	—	—	—	—	—
1994–95	Victoriaville Tigres	QMJHL	57	3	17	20	144	4	0	1	1	7
1995–96	Victoriaville Tigres	QMJHL	43	12	14	26	209	—	—	—	—	—
1995–96	Saint-Hyacinthe Laser	QMJHL	19	10	9	19	80	12	1	4	5	29
1996–97	Rouyn-Noranda Huskies	QMJHL	29	3	12	15	87	—	—	—	—	—
1996–97	Indianapolis Ice	IHL	10	0	1	1	17	—	—	—	—	—
1997–98	Rouyn-Noranda Huskies	QMJHL	66	20	48	68	205	6	1	3	4	8
1997–98	Indianapolis Ice	IHL	5	0	2	2	4	5	1	2	3	12
1998–99	Chicago Blackhawks	NHL	18	0	0	0	67	—	—	—	—	—
1998–99	Portland Pirates	AHL	2	0	1	1	2	—	—	—	—	—
1998–99	Indianapolis Ice	IHL	54	4	15	19	164	7	0	0	0	44
1999–00	Cleveland Lumberjacks	IHL	57	3	13	16	204	8	1	1	2	12
2000–01	Portland Pirates	AHL	40	1	7	8	140	—	—	—	—	—
2000–01	Louisville Panthers	AHL	18	1	1	2	50	—	—	—	—	—
2001–02	Pensacola Ice Pilots	ECHL	15	0	7	7	67	—	—	—	—	—
2001–02	Providence Bruins	AHL	24	3	5	8	69	—	—	—	—	—
2001–02	Florida Everblades	ECHL	3	1	1	2	8	—	—	—	—	—
2001–02	Quebec Citadelles	AHL	24	1	7	8	78	3	1	0	1	4
2002–03	Houston Aeros	AHL	3	0	0	0	15	—	—	—	—	—
2002–03	Florida Everblades	ECHL	2	0	1	1	18	—	—	—	—	—
2002–03	Reading Royals	ECHL	29	7	7	14	186	—	—	—	—	—
2003–04	Salavat Yulaev Ufa-2	RUS-3	1	2	1	3	0	—	—	—	—	—
2003–04	Indianapolis Ice	CHL	27	4	4	8	136	5	0	1	1	12
2004–05	Caron & Guay de Trois-Rivières	LNAH	22	3	6	9	100	—	—	—	—	—
2004–05	Radio X de Québec	LNAH	12	3	5	8	29	11	0	8	8	40
2005–06	Radio X de Québec	LNAH	51	12	40	52	315	4	0	3	3	52
2006–07	Briançon	FRA	20	2	10	12	110	8	0	0	0	12
2007–08	EC Salzburg	EBEL	26	2	9	11	66	10	3	4	7	14
2007–08	EC Salzburg 2	AUT-2	10	6	8	14	59	—	—	—	—	—
2008–09	EC Salzburg 2	AUT-2	22	8	17	25	61	4	0	1	1	20
2009–10	Olimpija Ljubljana	EBEL	9	3	6	9	14	—	—	—	—	—
2009–10	CIMT de Rivière-du-Loup	LNAH	23	5	18	23	57	—	—	—	—	—
2009–10	EHC Visp	NLB	2	0	2	2	2	—	—	—	—	—
2010–11	3L de Rivière-du-Loup	LNAH	22	4	15	19	73	—	—	—	—	—
2010–11	VEU Feldkirch	AUT-2	6	2	3	5	24	10	4	4	8	26
2011–12	Cool FM 103,5 de Saint-Georges	LNAH	35	10	15	25	151	—	—	—	—	—
LNAH totals			165	37	99	136	725	15	0	11	11	92
NHL totals			18	0	0	0	67	—	—	—	—	—
