= Sean Selmser =

Canadian ice hockey player

- Born: November 10, 1974 (age 51) Calgary, Alberta, Canada
- Height: 6 ft 1 in (185 cm)
- Weight: 195 lb (88 kg; 13 st 13 lb)
- Position: Left wing
- Shot: Left
- Played for: Ayr Scottish Eagles; Columbus Blue Jackets; Coventry Blaze; Dornbirner EC; EC Villacher SV; Fort Wayne Komets; Graz 99ers Hamilton Bulldogs; Hampton Roads Admirals; Manitoba Moose; Portland Pirates; Syracuse Crunch; Vienna Capitals
- National team: Austria
- NHL draft: 182nd overall, 1993; Pittsburgh Penguins
- Playing career: 1995–2012

Sean Selmser (born November 10, 1974) is a Canadian-born Austrian former professional ice hockey player. He played in one NHL game for the Columbus Blue Jackets during the 2000–01 NHL season.

== Career ==
After spending four seasons with Vienna Capitals in the Austrian Hockey League, he joined Coventry Blaze for the 2010-2011 Elite Ice Hockey League season where he was Alternate Captain. Selsmer joined Dornbirner EC of the second-tier Austrian National League. After scoring a career-high 59 points at age 38, Selsmer announced his retirement from professional hockey in May 2012.

== Personal ==
Selsmer was a head instructor at Summer Hockeyskolen, a summer hockey school located in Norway, from 1996 until 2000.

As a member of the Coventry Blaze, Selmser also attended nearby Coventry University and enrolled in several courses.

Since his retirement, Selsmer has become a sales representative for a Calgary-based mining company.

== Career statistics ==
			Regular season					Playoffs
Season	Team	League	GP	G	A	Pts	PIM	GP	G	A	Pts	PIM
1991–92	Moose Jaw Warriors	WHL	2	0	0	0	0	2	0	0	0	0
1991–92	Calgary Buffaloes Midget AAA	AMHL	32	21	24	45	131	—	—	—	—	—
1992–93	Red Deer Rebels	WHL	70	13	27	40	216	4	0	0	0	10
1993–94	Red Deer Rebels	WHL	71	25	25	50	201	4	1	0	1	14
1994–95	Red Deer Rebels	WHL	33	11	17	28	65	—	—	—	—	—
1995–96	Hampton Roads Admirals	ECHL	70	23	31	54	211	3	2	0	2	8
1995–96	Portland Pirates	AHL	6	4	1	5	28	5	2	3	5	11
1996–97	Manitoba Moose	IHL	4	0	2	2	12	—	—	—	—	—
1997–98	Portland Pirates	AHL	—	—	—	—	—	1	0	1	1	0
1998–99	Fort Wayne Komets	IHL	80	9	15	24	200	2	0	0	0	2
1999–00	Hamilton Bulldogs	AHL	72	14	12	26	151	10	3	4	7	10
2000–01	Columbus Blue Jackets	NHL	1	0	0	0	0	—	—	—	—	—
2000–01	Syracuse Crunch	AHL	75	11	15	26	151	5	0	0	0	14
2001–02	Hamilton Bulldogs	AHL	80	10	16	26	103	15	1	5	6	8
2002–03	Scottish Eagles	BISL	8	4	3	7	21	—	—	—	—	—
2002–03	Villacher SV	Austria	29	5	15	20	79	13	9	6	15	26
2003–04	Villacher SV	EBEL	48	14	41	55	76	8	7	1	8	24
2004–05	Graz 99ers	EBEL	48	26	31	57	103	—	—	—	—	—
2005–06	Graz 99ers	EBEL	44	12	17	29	103	—	—	—	—	—
2006–07	Vienna Capitals	EBEL	55	16	32	48	121	3	0	1	1	2
2007–08	Vienna Capitals	EBEL	40	12	20	32	26	7	1	3	4	8
2008–09	Vienna Capitals	EBEL	53	16	19	35	99	12	0	2	2	10
2009–10	Vienna Capitals	EBEL	54	11	20	31	116	12	0	3	3	6
2010–11	Coventry Blaze	EIHL	50	13	23	36	64	2	1	0	1	4
2011–12	EC Dornbirn	Austria2	32	20	39	59	79	8	3	5	8	24
NHL totals			1	0	0	0	5	—	—	—	—	—
AHL totals			233	39	44	83	433	36	6	13	19	43
EBEL totals			342	107	180	287	644	42	8	10	18	50

== See also ==
- List of players who played only one game in the NHL
