= Jan Němeček =

Czech ice hockey player

- Born: February 14, 1976 (age 50) Písek, Czechoslovakia
- Height: 6 ft 2 in (188 cm)
- Weight: 214 lb (97 kg; 15 st 4 lb)
- Position: Defence
- Shot: Left
- Played for: Los Angeles Kings
- National team: Czech Republic
- NHL draft: 215th overall, 1994; Los Angeles Kings
- Playing career: 1999–2015

Jan Němeček (born February 14, 1976) is a Czech former professional ice hockey defenceman. He was drafted 215th overall in the 1994 NHL entry draft by the Los Angeles Kings and played seven games in the National Hockey League for the Kings, scoring one goal.

== Career statistics ==
			Regular season					Playoffs
Season	Team	League	GP	G	A	Pts	PIM	GP	G	A	Pts	PIM
1992–93	HC Ceske Budejovice	Czech	15	0	0	0	—	—	—	—	—	—
1993–94	HC Ceske Budejovice	Czech	16	0	1	1	4	—	—	—	—	—
1994–95	Hull Olympiques	QMJHL	49	10	16	26	48	21	5	9	14	10
1995–96	Hull Olympiques	QMJHL	57	17	49	66	58	17	2	13	15	10
1996–97	Phoenix Roadrunners	IHL	24	1	1	2	2	—	—	—	—	—
1996–97	Mississippi Sea Wolves	ECHL	20	3	9	12	16	3	0	0	0	4
1997–98	Fredericton Canadiens	AHL	65	7	24	31	43	2	0	0	0	0
1998–99	Los Angeles Kings	NHL	6	1	0	1	4	—	—	—	—	—
1998–99	Long Beach Ice Dogs	IHL	66	5	16	21	42	—	—	—	—	—
1999–00	Los Angeles Kings	NHL	1	0	0	0	0	—	—	—	—	—
1999–00	Long Beach Ice Dogs	IHL	71	9	15	24	22	6	1	0	1	4
2000–01	Nürnberg Ice Tigers	DEL	60	5	16	21	16	4	1	0	1	0
2001–02	Nürnberg Ice Tigers	DEL	60	6	8	14	18	4	0	3	3	2
2002–03	HC Becherovka Karlovy Vary	Czech	30	1	9	10	16	—	—	—	—	—
2002–03	KLH Chomutov	Czech2	2	0	0	0	0	—	—	—	—	—
2003–04	Timrå IK	SHL	50	4	8	12	18	9	0	1	1	2
2004–05	Leksands IF	Allsvenskan	36	3	10	13	18	10	1	3	4	0
2005–06	Leksands IF	SHL	40	2	8	10	6	10	1	2	3	8
2006–07	HC Bolzano	Italy	38	9	29	38	26	1	0	0	0	2
2007–08	Odense Bulldogs	Denmark	43	8	25	33	65	11	0	6	6	10
2008–09	Ritten Sport	Italy	34	12	17	29	14	—	—	—	—	—
2009–10	Ritten Sport	Italy	35	7	22	29	16	15	4	5	9	0
2010–11	HC Fassa	Italy	39	3	10	13	14	5	0	1	1	4
2011–12	VEU Feldkirch	Austria	19	6	12	18	10	—	—	—	—	—
2011–12	EK Zell am See	Austria	11	1	9	10	4	—	—	—	—	—
2012–13	EHC Freiburg	Germany3	37	4	13	17	12	2	1	0	1	0
2013–14	IHC Pisek	Czech4	11	0	0	0	0	—	—	—	—	—
NHL totals			7	1	0	1	4	—	—	—	—	—
