= Mike Harder =

Canadian ice hockey player

- Born: February 8, 1973 (age 53) Winnipeg, Manitoba, Canada
- Height: 6 ft 0 in (183 cm)
- Weight: 180 lb (82 kg; 12 st 12 lb)
- Position: Center
- Shot: Right
- Played for: Milwaukee Admirals; Hamilton Bulldogs; Springfield Falcons; Rochester Americans; Hartford Wolf Pack; Louisville Panthers; HPK; Brynäs IF; HC Merano; Frankfurt Lions; Charlotte Checkers; ERC Ingolstadt; Alleghe Hockey; Trenton Devils
- Playing career: 1993–2010
- Coaching career
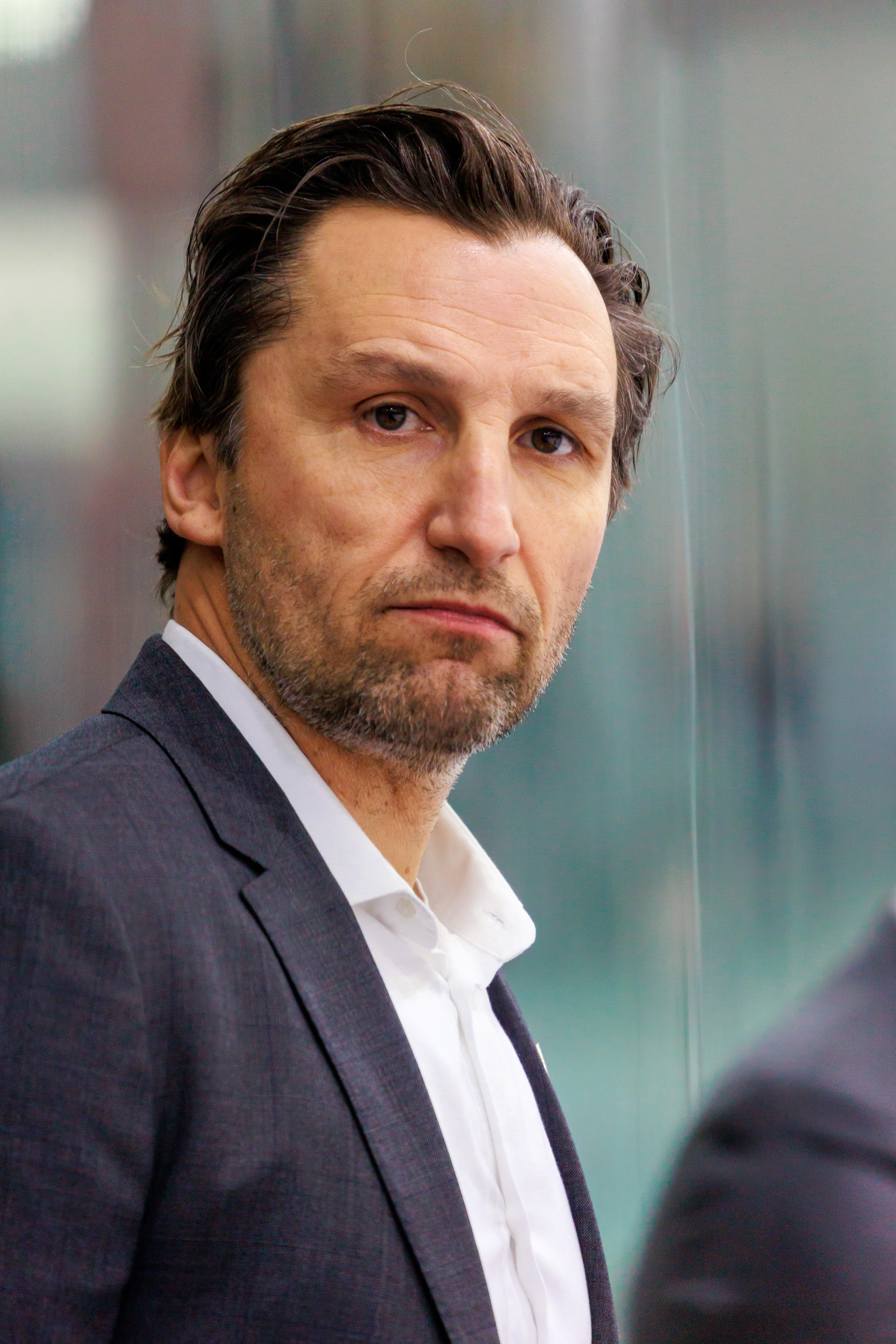
- Harder in 2025

Current position
- Title: Head coach
- Team: Colgate
- Conference: ECAC Hockey

Biographical details
- Education: Colgate University

Coaching career (HC unless noted)
- 2011–2012: SG Cortina (assistant)
- 2013–2014: Colgate (volunteer assistant)
- 2014–2019: Colgate (assistant)
- 2023–Present: Colgate

Head coaching record
- Overall: 34–31–7 (.521)

Michael J. Harder (born February 8, 1973) is a Canadian ice hockey coach and former professional player who was an All-American for Colgate.

== Career ==
Harder arrived in Hamilton in the fall of 1993 after finishing out his junior career with the Weyburn Red Wings. He began producing offense immediately for Colgate, tying for the team lead in points as a freshman and being named to the ECAC All-Rookie team. Harder finished in the top ten in the nation the following year, helping Colgate win 20 games and finish 3rd in the conference standings. Harder remained the focal point of the Red Raiders' offense over the next two years, and was named team captain in his senior season. While the team managed to produce winning records in those years, they lost all three of their playoff games. Despite the disappointing finishes, Harder became Colgate's all-time leading scorer and was named an All-American and Hobey Baker finalist in his senior year.

After finishing his college career, Harder turned pro and rounded out the year with a few games of AAA hockey. He had a solid year in 1998 and became a point-per-game player with the Rochester Americans in 1999. He helped the team reach the Calder Cup finals that season and looked to be on track to reach the NHL but instead played for several AHL teams until 2001 when he headed to Europe.

After a season with Brynäs IF in the Swedish Hockey League, Harder settled in with the Frankfurt Lions. He helped the club win the DEL championship in 2004, the only title in the team's history. The heavy underdog Lions surprisingly disposed of three higher ranked teams (Cologne Sharks, Hamburg Freezers and Berlin Polar Bears) in the playoffs, with Harder scoring the series clinching goal in each round, setting a league record.

A few years later, he found his way to Alleghe and spent four years with the team, averaging at least a point per game each season. He returned to North America for one final season before retiring in 2010.

In 2013, Harder returned to Colgate as a volunteer assistant and was brought on full time the following season. He remained with the team until 2019.

Harder was inducted into the Colgate Athletic Hall of Fame in 2008.

== Statistics ==
=== Regular season and playoffs ===
			Regular Season					Playoffs
Season	Team	League	GP	G	A	Pts	PIM	GP	G	A	Pts	PIM
1991–92	Weyburn Red Wings	SJHL	61	18	34	52	44	—	—	—	—	—
1992–93	Weyburn Red Wings	SJHL	64	41	63	104	47	—	—	—	—	—
1993–94	Colgate	ECAC Hockey	33	21	25	46	14	—	—	—	—	—
1994–95	Colgate	ECAC Hockey	36	22	36	58	18	—	—	—	—	—
1995–96	Colgate	ECAC Hockey	32	23	32	55	26	—	—	—	—	—
1996–97	Colgate	ECAC Hockey	33	22	33	55	20	—	—	—	—	—
1996–97	Hamilton Bulldogs	AHL	2	0	1	1	0	—	—	—	—	—
1996–97	Milwaukee Admirals	IHL	7	1	3	4	6	2	0	1	1	0
1997–98	Springfield Falcons	AHL	3	2	0	2	2	—	—	—	—	—
1997–98	Milwaukee Admirals	IHL	64	20	17	37	32	—	—	—	—	—
1997–98	Springfield Falcons	AHL	8	4	2	6	0	4	3	2	5	8
1998–99	Rochester Americans	AHL	79	31	48	79	39	20	2	9	11	23
1999–00	Hartford Wolf Pack	AHL	56	18	21	39	33	12	0	4	4	4
2000–01	Hartford Wolf Pack	AHL	36	10	19	29	27	—	—	—	—	—
2000–01	Louisville Panthers	AHL	38	13	24	37	8	—	—	—	—	—
2001–02	HPK	SM-Liiga	4	0	0	0	2	—	—	—	—	—
2001–02	Brynäs IF	Elitserien	11	4	3	7	4	4	0	0	0	0
2002–03	Springfield Falcons	AHL	1	0	0	0	0	—	—	—	—	—
2002–03	HC Merano	Italy	26	18	24	42	10	—	—	—	—	—
2003–04	Frankfurt Lions	DEL	50	2	15	17	42	15	5	5	10	12
2004–05	Charlotte Checkers	ECHL	42	12	31	43	24	—	—	—	—	—
2004–05	ERC Ingolstadt	DEL	7	0	0	0	4	11	0	1	1	4
2005–06	Alleghe Hockey	Italy	48	23	38	61	48	4	2	3	5	10
2006–07	Alleghe Hockey	Italy	40	21	53	74	60	10	3	9	12	10
2007–08	Alleghe Hockey	Italy	41	17	33	50	36	—	—	—	—	—
2008–09	Alleghe Hockey	Italy	35	6	29	35	22	—	—	—	—	—
2008–09	VEU Feldkirch	Austria 2	5	3	6	9	0	8	7	9	16	6
2009–10	Trenton Devils	ECHL	22	3	13	16	24	—	—	—	—	—
2009–10	Charlotte Checkers	ECHL	16	4	4	8	6	—	—	—	—	—
2009–10	VEU Feldkirch	Austria 2	7	5	6	11	2	4	3	2	5	0
SJHL totals			125	59	97	156	91	—	—	—	—	—
NCAA totals			134	88	126	214	78	—	—	—	—	—
ECHL totals			80	19	48	67	54	—	—	—	—	—
IHL totals			71	21	20	41	38	2	0	1	1	0
AHL totals			223	78	115	193	109	36	5	15	20	35
Austria 2 totals			12	8	12	20	2	12	10	11	21	6
DEL totals			57	2	15	17	46	26	5	6	11	16
Italy totals			190	85	177	262	176	14	5	12	17	20

== Awards and honors ==
Award	Year
All-ECAC Hockey Rookie Team	1993–94
All-ECAC Hockey Second Team	1994–95
All-ECAC Hockey Second Team	1995–96
All-ECAC Hockey First Team	1996–97
AHCA East Second-Team All-American	1996–97

== Head coaching record ==
Record table
Season	Team	Overall	Conference	Standing	Postseason
Colgate Raiders (ECAC Hockey) (2023–present)
2023–24	Colgate	16–16–4	13–7–2	3rd	ECAC Quarterfinals
2024–25	Colgate	18–15–3	13–7–2	3rd	ECAC Quarterfinals
Colgate:		34–31–7	26–14–4		
Total:		34–31–7			
National champion Postseason invitational champion Conference regular season champion Conference regular season and conference tournament champion Division regular season champion Division regular season and conference tournament champion Conference tournament champion
