= Ö Eishockey Liga =

Ice hockey league in Austria

- Sport: Ice hockey
- Founded: 2021
- First season: 2021–22
- No. of teams: 12
- Countries: Austria (11 teams); Slovenia (1 team)
- Continent: Europe
- Most recent champions: EHC Lustenau (1st title) (2025–26)
- Most titles: WSG Wattens Penguins; ESC Steindorf; KSV Eishockey; UEHV Gmunden Sharks; EHC Lustenau (1 title each)
- Website: Official website

The Ö Eishockey Liga (ÖEL) is an ice hockey league based in Austria. Established in 2021, it is the third level of Austrian ice hockey and serves as a link between the regional leagues and the Alps Hockey League (AlpsHL). It is operated by the Austrian Ice Hockey Association.

== Teams ==
In the 2026–27 season, the ÖEL consists of 12 teams, with 11 teams from Austria and 1 from Slovenia.

=== Current teams ===
==== East Division ====
Club	Location	Years
ASKÖ Grizzlies Linz	Linz	2026–present
ATSE Graz	Graz	2021–present
HDK Maribor	(Slovenia) Maribor	2024–present
KSV Eishockey	Kapfenberg	2021–present
UEHV Gmunden Sharks	Gmunden	2021–present
Wiener EV	Vienna	2021–present

==== West Division ====
Club	Location	Years
Dornbirn Bulldogs	Dornbirn	2023–present
EHC Kundl	Kundl	2021–present
EHC Lustenau	Lustenau	2024–present
HC Kufstein	Kufstein	2021–present
SC Hohenems	Hohenems	2021–present
WSG Wattens Penguins	Wattens	2021–2023; 2024–present

=== Former teams ===
Club	Location	Years
ESC Steindorf	Steindorf am Ossiacher See	2021–2023
EHC Althofen	Althofen	2021–2023
USC Velden	Velden am Wörther See	2021–2023
EC SV Spittal	Spittal an der Drau	2021–2023
EC VSV II	Villach	2021–2023
UECR Huben	Matrei in Osttirol	2021–2023
HC Innsbruck II	Innsbruck	2021–2023
EV Zeltweg	Zeltweg	2021–2024
UHT Dukes Graz	Graz	2022–2024
VEU Feldkirch	Feldkirch	2022–2024

== Finals ==
=== List of finals ===
From the inaugural season until 2024–25, the champion was determined by a two-legged tie, with the winner determined by aggregate score. Since the 2025–26 season, the championship has been decided in a best-of-three format.

Season	Champions	Runners-up	Score (Note: Aggregate score is listed for the seasons between 2021–22 and 2024–25; starting from the 2025–26 season onwards, the score indicates a best-of-three series result.)
2021–22	WSG Wattens Penguins	KSV Eishockey	6–3
2022–23	ESC Steindorf	SC Hohenems	9–7
2023–24	KSV Eishockey	SC Hohenems	8–5
2024–25	UEHV Gmunden Sharks	SC Hohenems	8–4
2025–26	EHC Lustenau	KSV Eishockey	2–1

=== Performance by club ===
Club	Titles	Runners-up	Years won	Years runners-up
KSV Eishockey	1	2	2024	2022, 2026
WSG Wattens Penguins	1	0	2022	—
ESC Steindorf	1	0	2023	—
UEHV Gmunden Sharks	1	0	2025	—
EHC Lustenau	1	0	2026	—
SC Hohenems	0	3	—	2023, 2024, 2025
