= 2012–13 Inter-National League season =

The 2012–13 Inter-National League season was the first season of the Inter-National League, a multi-national ice hockey league consisting of teams from Austria and Slovenia. It served as the successor to the Austrian National League, which had operated as the second level of ice hockey in Austria. Six teams – four from Austria and two from Slovenia – participated in the league, and Bregenzerwald won the championship.

== Regular season ==
Pl.	Team	GP	W	L	OTW	OTL	SOW	SOL	Goals	Diff	Pts
1	Zell am See	30	22	8	2	0	3	0	116–93	+23	61
2	Slavija	30	14	16	1	1	1	3	72–83	–11	44
3	Triglav Kranj	30	14	16	0	3	1	0	103–100	+3	44
4	Bregenzerwald	30	14	16	2	1	1	2	107–97	+10	42
5	Feldkirch	30	13	17	1	1	0	2	83–87	–4	41
6	Lustenau	30	13	17	2	2	1	0	90–111	–21	38

== Playoffs ==
Semifinals
1	Zell am See	2
4	Bregenzerwald	3
2	Slavija	3
3	Triglav Kranj	0

Finals
2	Slavija	2
4	Bregenzerwald	3
