= Daniel Schildorfer =

Austrian ice hockey player

- Born: 15 January 1982 (age 43)
- Height: 5 ft 10 in (178 cm)
- Position: Wing
- Played for: Graz 99ers Pittsburgh Forge; EC VSV; EV Aicall Zeltweg

Daniel Schildorfer (born 15 January 1982) is an Austrian ice hockey player currently playing for Graz 99ers in the Austrian Hockey League.

Schildorfer spent two seasons in the North American Hockey League with the Pittsburgh Forge before returning to Austria. He had single season spells with EV Aicall Zeltweg and EC VSV before moving to Graz to 2005.
