= John Van Kessel =

Canadian ice hockey player

- Born: December 19, 1969 (age 56) Bridgewater, Nova Scotia, Canada
- Height: 6 ft 4 in (193 cm)
- Weight: 216 lb (98 kg; 15 st 6 lb)
- Position: Right wing
- Shot: Right
- Played for: New Haven Nighthawks; Phoenix Roadrunners; New Haven Senators; Cape Breton Oilers; Kaufbeurer Adler; EV Landshut; Düsseldorfer EG; Krefeld Pinguine; EV Zeltweg
- NHL draft: 49th overall, 1988; Los Angeles Kings
- Playing career: 1990–2001

John Van Kessel (born December 19, 1969) is a Canadian former professional ice hockey player. Van Kessel played ten professional seasons, in the American Hockey League (AHL), East Coast Hockey League (ECHL) and International Hockey League (IHL) in North America, and in the Deutsche Eishockey Liga (DEL) and Austrian Hockey League (AL) in Europe.

== Playing career ==
He began his junior hockey career with the Belleville Bulls of Ontario Hockey League (OHL) during the 1986–87 season. He scored his first OHL goal and only goal of that season against the Kingston Canadians on February 8, 1987. He finished the season with 11 points in 61 games. He played in six games with Belleville to start the 1987–88 season before he was traded to the North Bay Centennials on November 4, 1987 along with defenceman Scott Shepherd and a draft pick for forwards Troy Crowder and Rich Stromback. Van Kessel spent the rest of the season. He returned to North Bay for the 1988–89 season.

Van Kessel was drafted by the Los Angeles Kings of the National Hockey League in the third round, 49th overall, in the 1988 NHL entry draft. He was considered a project with toughness at the draft. He attended the Kings' 1989 training camp before being assigned to the team's American Hockey League (AHL) affiliate, the New Haven Nighthawks. He began the 1989–90 season with New Haven before returning to the OHL and North Bay to finish the season. For the 1990–91 season, he was assigned by the Kings to the Phoenix Roadrunners of the International Hockey League (IHL). He scored his first goal in for the Roadrunners on November 2, 1990 in a 4–3 win over the Muskegon Lumberjacks. Van Kessel had the best season of his career, scoring 15 goals and 30 points in 65 games and 246 penalty minutes, which was third-most on the team. The Kings sent Van Kessel to Phoenix again for the 1991–92 season, but he did not replicate his previous year, only registering two goals and eight points in 44 games.

The Kings chose not to protect Van Kessel in the 1992 NHL expansion draft and he was selected by the Ottawa Senators. He was assigned to Ottawa's AHL affiliate, the New Haven Senators for the 1992–93 season. At the end of the season, he became an unrestricted free agent.

As a free agent, he signed a 25-game tryout with the Cincinnati Cyclones of the IHL in September 1993. He did not make any appearances for them, leaving the team on September 26. He then joined the Cape Breton Oilers of the AHL for the majority of the 1993–94 season, but spent some time with the Wheeling Thunderbirds of the East Coast Hockey League (ECHL). He returned to Cape Breton for the 1994–95 season.

In December 1995, Van Kessel was named to Canada's team for the Izvestia Cup. He joined the Hampton Roads Admirals of the ECHL for the 1995–96 season. He saw little playing time and was placed on waivers by the team in January for the purposes of cutting him from the team. Van Kessel then moved overseas playing in Germany's Deutsche Eishockey Liga (DEL). He spent the 1997–98 season playing for Kaufbeurer Adler, EV Landshut and Düsseldorfer EG. He played one more season in the DEL, with the Krefeld Pinguine. He did not play for two seasons then played a three-games tryout with EV Zeltweg of the Austrian Hockey League in 2001–02 to end his professional career.

== Career statistics ==
			Regular season					Playoffs
Season	Team	League	GP	G	A	Pts	PIM	GP	G	A	Pts	PIM
1986–87	Belleville Bulls	OHL	61	1	10	11	58	—	—	—	—	—
1987–88	Belleville Bulls	OHL	6	1	0	1	11	—	—	—	—	—
1987–88	North Bay Centennials	OHL	44	12	16	28	203	4	1	1	2	16
1988–89	North Bay Centennials	OHL	50	7	13	20	218	11	2	4	6	32
1989–90	North Bay Centennials	OHL	40	7	21	28	127	5	0	3	3	16
1989–90	New Haven Nighthawks	AHL	6	1	1	2	9	—	—	—	—	—
1990–91	Phoenix Roadrunners	IHL	65	15	15	30	246	3	1	1	2	16
1991–92	Phoenix Roadrunners	IHL	44	2	6	8	247	—	—	—	—	—
1992–93	New Haven Senators	AHL	17	2	3	5	60	—	—	—	—	—
1993–94	Wheeling Thunderbirds	ECHL	17	1	8	9	119	—	—	—	—	—
1993–94	Cape Breton Oilers	AHL	37	2	7	9	154	5	0	0	0	12
1994–95	Cape Breton Oilers	AHL	38	8	9	17	148	—	—	—	—	—
1995–96	Hampton Roads Admirals	ECHL	5	1	3	4	14	—	—	—	—	—
1996–97	HK Bled	Slovenia	29	—	—	—	185	—	—	—	—	—
1997–98	Kaufbeurer Adler	DEL	13	3	1	4	49	—	—	—	—	—
1997–98	EV Landshut	DEL	4	2	2	4	6	—	—	—	—	—
1997–98	Düsseldorfer EG	DEL	20	3	2	5	93	2	0	0	0	29
1998–99	Krefeld Pinguine	DEL	36	6	7	13	81	—	—	—	—	—
2000–01	EV Zeltweg	Austria	3	0	1	1	33	—	—	—	—	—
AHL totals			98	13	20	33	371	5	0	0	0	12
IHL totals			109	17	21	38	493	3	1	1	2	16
