= Alexander Neubauer =

Austrian ice hockey player

- Born: 15 July 1986 (age 38)
- Height: 5 ft 10 in (178 cm)
- Weight: 176 lb (80 kg; 12 st 8 lb)
- Position: Defence
- Shoots: Left
- Austrian NL team Former teams: Kapfenberg; EC VSV; Graz 99ers
- Playing career: 2005–present

Alexander Neubauer (born 15 July 1986) is an Austrian ice hockey player currently playing for Kapfenberg (in the province Styria) of the Austrian Nationalliga.

Neubauer began his career with VSV EC in 2003 and remained with the team until 2006, when he joined Graz 99ers.
