= Austrian Oberliga =

Ice hockey league in Austria (1968–2011)

- Sport: Ice hockey
- Founded: 1968; 58 years ago
- Ceased: 2011; 15 years ago
- Country: Austria

The Austrian Oberliga was an ice hockey league in Austria. It was the second or third highest and simultaneously the lowest national division in Austrian ice hockey, and was played irregularly between 1968–69 and 2010–11.

== Champions ==
Season	Champion
1968-69	EC Innsbruck-Pradl
1969-70	Grazer AK
1970-71	WAT Stadlau
1971-72	HC Salzburg
1972-73	Kapfenberger SV
1973-74	EHC Lustenau
1974-75	EK Zell am See
1975-76	Spetrans Wien
1976-77	WAT Stadlau
1977-78	EV Zeltweg
1978-79	Dornbirner EC
1979-80	Grazer SV
1980-81	SV Leoben
1983-84	ATSE Graz (Ost)
1984-85	Kapfenberger SV
1985-86	ASKÖ-EHC Linz
1994-95	DSG Rotschitzen
1995-96	EC Kitzbühel
1997-98	SV Silz
1998-99	EHC Wattens
1999-2000	EHC Fischerbräu Wien
2000-01	EC Red Bulls Salzburg
2003-04	EC "Die Adler" Stadtwerke Kitzbühel
2004-05	EC "Die Adler" Stadtwerke Kitzbühel
2005-06	UEC "The Dragons" Mödling
2006-07	UEC "The Dragons" Mödling
2007-08	ATUS Weiz Bulls
2008-09	ATSE Graz
2009-10	ATSE Graz
2010-11	EC Graz
