= Stefan Herzog =

Austrian ice hockey player

- Born: March 19, 1983 (age 42); Salzburg, AUT
- Height: 5 ft 10 in (178 cm)
- Weight: 185 lb (84 kg; 13 st 3 lb)
- Position: Forward
- Shoots: Left
- EBEL team Former teams: Graz 99ers EK Zell am See; EC VSV
- Playing career: 1999–present

Stefan Herzog (born March 19, 1983, in Salzburg) is an Austrian ice hockey forward who plays for the Graz 99ers of the Erste Bank Hockey League.

== Career ==
Herzog began his career with EK Zell am See for three seasons. He then moved to VSV EC in 2002, where he spent four seasons. His best performance was in the 2003/04 season when he scored 16 goals and 22 points in 48 games. In the following two seasons, he had just 5 goals and 9 points. He joined Graz in 2006.
