= 2008–09 Austrian National League season =

The 2008–09 Austrian National League season was contested by eight teams, and saw EHC Lustenau win the championship. All eight teams that participated in the regular season qualified for the playoffs.

== Regular season ==
Place	Team	GP	W (OT/SO W)	L (OT/SO L)	Goals	Pts
1.	EHC Lustenau	28	20 (2)	8 (1)	139:94	45
2.	EC Dornbirn	28	17 (0)	11 (1)	119:82	38
3.	EK Zell am See	28	18 (3)	10 (0)	121:93	37
4.	VEU Feldkirch	28	16 (0)	12 (2)	110:92	37
5.	EV Zeltweg	28	13 (2)	15 (1)	97:110	31
6.	EC Red Bull Salzburg 2	28	13 (1)	15 (1)	108:99	30
7.	KSV Kapfenberg	28	11 (1)	17 (3)	95:111	25
8.	EHC Bregenzerwald	28	4 (1)	24 (1)	68:176	11

== Playoffs ==
Quarterfinals
1	EHC Lustenau	3
8	EHC Bregenzerwald	0
4	VEU Feldkirch	3
5	EV Zeltweg	1
2	EC Dornbirn	3
7	KSV Kapfenberg	1
3	EK Zell am See	3
6	Red Bull Salzburg 2	1

Semifinals
1	EHC Lustenau	3
4	VEU Feldkirch	1
2	EC Dornbirn	3
3	EK Zell am See	1

Finals
1	EHC Lustenau	3
2	EC Dornbirn	1
