= 2009–10 Austrian National League season =

The 2009–10 Austrian National League season was contested by seven teams, and saw EC Dornbirn win the championship. The top six teams from the regular season qualified for the playoffs. HC Innsbruck and EC Dornbirn received byes to the semifinals.

== Regular season ==
	Team	GP	W	L	OTW	OTL	SOW	SOL	Goals	Diff	Pts
1	HC Innsbruck	36	27	9	3	0	1	2	170:88	+82	54
2	EC Dornbirn	36	23	13	1	1	3	1	155:113	+42	47
3	EC Red Bull Salzburg II	36	22	14	1	0	0	1	144:94	+50	43
4	VEU Feldkirch	36	20	16	1	2	1	2	121:113	+8	40
5	EHC Lustenau	36	19	17	3	2	2	0	124:137	-13	31
6	EK Zeller Eisbären	36	10	26	1	4	1	1	109:173	-64	23
7	EHC Bregenzerwald	36	5	31	1	2	0	1	85:190	-105	15

== Playoffs ==
=== Quarterfinals ===
Teams	Series	Game 1	Game 2	Game 3
EC Red Bull Salzburg II (3) - EK Zeller Eisbären (6)	2:0	6:1 (2:1, 3:0, 1:0)	7:4 (5:1, 2:2, 0:1)	–
VEU Feldkirch (4) - EHC Lustenau (5)	2:0	4:1 (1:0, 2:1, 1:0)	4:1 (2:1, 1:0, 1:0)	–

=== Semifinals ===
Teams	Series	Game 1	Game 2	Game 3	Game 4	Game 5
HC Innsbruck (1) - VEU Feldkirch (4)	3:0	2:0 (0:0, 1:0, 1:0)	3:2 OT (0:0,1:2,1:0,1:0)	4:1 (1:0, 2:0, 1:1)	–	–
EC Dornbirn (2) - EC Red Bull Salzburg II (3)	3:0	5:4 (1:3, 1:1, 3:0)	3:2 (1:0,1:0,1:2)	6:3 (1:1, 2:1, 3:1)	–	–

=== Final ===
Teams	Series	Game 1	Game 2	Game 3	Game 4	Game 5
HC Innsbruck (1) - EC Dornbirn (2)	1:3	2:3 n.V. (1:0, 0:1, 1:1, 0:1)	2:3 (0:0, 0:3, 2:0)	2:1 (0:1, 1:0, 1:0)	1:5 (1:1, 0:2, 0:2)	–
