= Nikolas Petrik =

Austrian ice hockey player (born 1984)

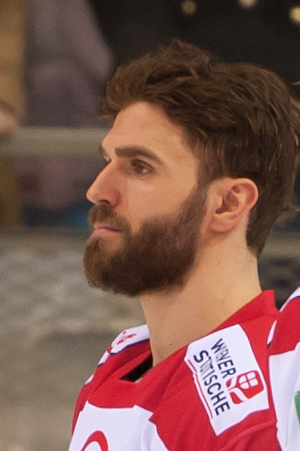
- Born: March 19, 1984 (age 42) Villach, Austria
- Height: 5 ft 10 in (178 cm)
- Weight: 187 lb (85 kg; 13 st 5 lb)
- Position: Forward
- Shot: Left
- Played for: EC VSV; Graz 99ers Dornbirner EC
- National team: Austria
- Playing career: 2001–2019

Nikolas Petrik (born March 19, 1984) is an Austrian former professional ice hockey forward who played in the Austrian Hockey League (EBEL).

== Playing career ==
He began his professional career playing exclusively with EC VSV before later joining Dornbirner EC on August 10, 2012.

After five seasons with Dornbirner, Petrik returned to Captain and join brother Benjamin at EC VSV, in signing a two-year contract on March 27, 2017.

Having played 12 out of his 18 professional seasons with Villach, Petrik announced his retirement following the 2018–19 season, remaining with EC VSV in accepting the position of athletic trainer on 4 April 2019.

== International play ==
He participated with the Austrian national team at the 2015 IIHF World Championship.
