= 2011–12 Austrian National League season =

The 2011–12 Austrian National League season was contested by 12 teams, and saw HC Innsbruck win the championship. The top eight teams from the regular season qualified for the playoffs. One Hungarian team, DAB-Docler participated in the league.

== Regular season ==
	Team	GP	W	L	OTW	OTL	SOW	SOL	Goals	Diff	Pts
1	ATSE Graz	32	28	4	0	0	3	1	154:61	+93	82
2	EC Dornbirn	32	25	7	3	0	1	2	156:68	+88	73
3	HC Innsbruck	32	24	8	0	0	1	2	175:61	+114	73
4	VEU Feldkirch	32	23	9	1	2	1	1	127:82	+45	70
5	DAB-Docler	32	23	9	1	0	1	1	153:85	+68	68
6	EHC Lustenau	32	17	15	0	1	2	0	113:97	+16	50
7	EK Zell am See	32	13	19	0	2	1	0	105:113	-8	40
8	Kapfenberg Bulls	32	12	20	1	0	0	2	92:124	-32	37
9	Vienna Capitals II	32	11	21	0	3	3	2	85:128	-43	35
10	EHC Bregenzerwald	32	7	25	1	1	0	3	85:130	-45	24
11	EC KAC II	32	6	26	1	0	1	1	64:182	-118	17
12	EHC Linz II	32	3	29	1	0	1	0	54:232	-178	7

== Playoffs ==
Quarterfinals
1	ATSE Graz	3
8	Kapfenberg Bulls	1
4	VEU Feldkirch	3
5	DAB-Docler	2
2	EC Dornbirn	3
7	EK Zell am See	1
3	HC Innsbruck	3
6	EHC Lustenau	0

Semifinals
1	ATSE Graz	3
4	VEU Feldkirch	1
2	EC Dornbirn	1
3	HC Innsbruck	3

Finals
1	ATSE Graz	0
3	HC Innsbruck	3
