= KSV Ice Tigers =

- City: Kapfenberg, Austria
- League: Austrian National League
- Founded: 2002
- Home arena: Sportzentrum Kapfenberg
- Colours: Blue, Red, White

Franchise history
- 2002–2005: KSV Ice Stars
- 2005–present: KSV Ice Tigers

The KSV Ice Tigers are an ice hockey team in Kapfenberg, Austria that play in the Austrian National League, the second level of ice hockey in Austria. The club was founded as the KSV Ice Stars in 2002. The name was changed to the KSV Ice Tigers in 2005.
