= Messestadion =

Indoor sporting arena in Dornbirn, Austria

Coordinates: 47°24′27″N 9°42′40″E

Messestadion Dornbirn
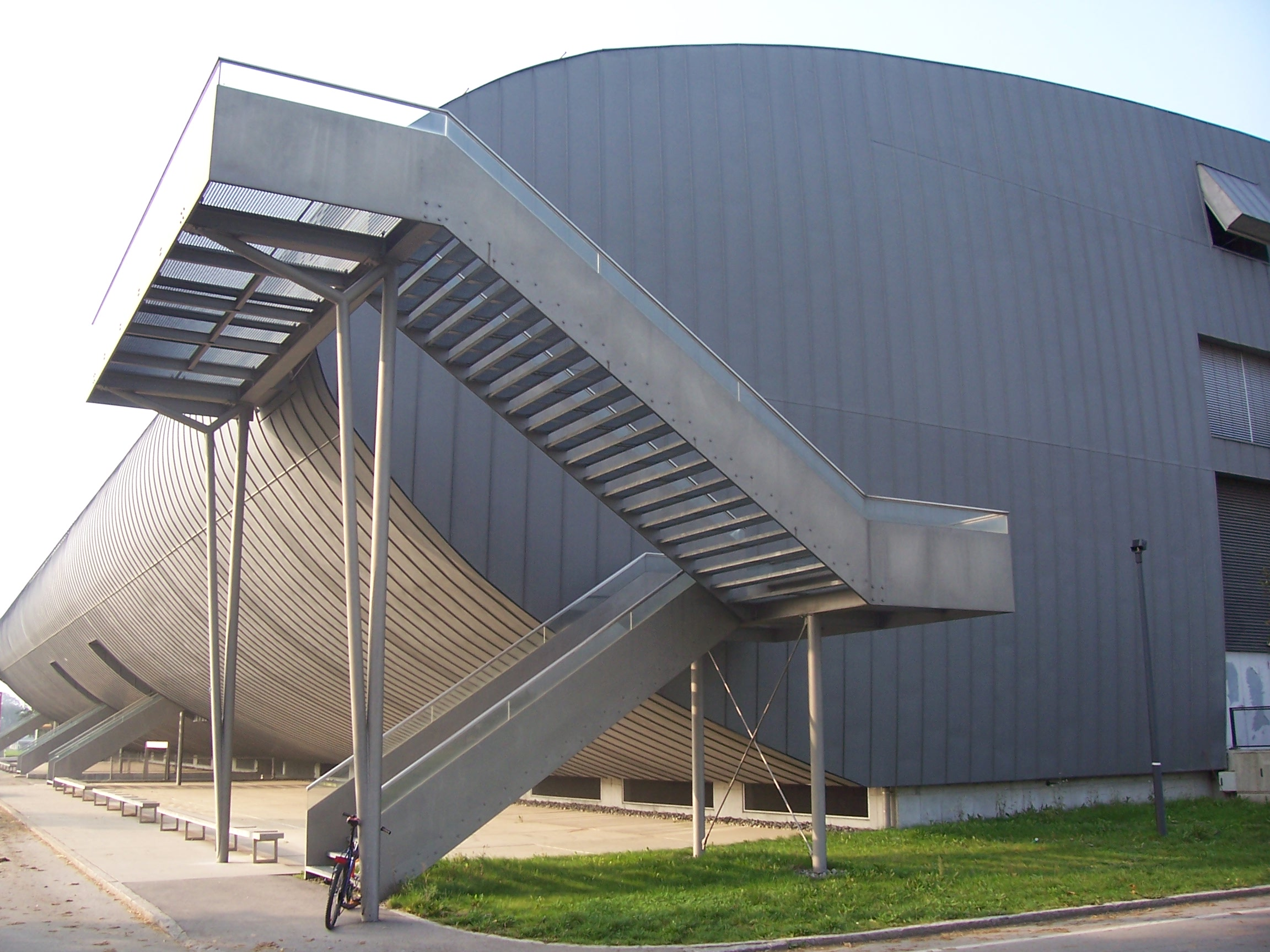
- Interactive map of Messestadion Dornbirn
- Location: Messeplatz 1, 6850 Dornbirn
- Capacity: 4,270

Construction
- Opened: 1999

Tenants
- Dornbirner EC (EBEL); EC Bregenzerwald (AHL)

Messestadion is an indoor sporting arena located in Dornbirn, Austria. The arena has a capacity of 4,270 people and was built in 1999. It is currently the home arena of Dornbirner EC who play in the Austrian Hockey League and EC Bregenzerwald of the Alps Hockey League.

In 2014 the stadium was renovated, adding a ColosseoEAS 38 SQM HD LED screen along with a smartphone platform that offers fans connectivity while at the stadium.
