= 2023–24 Colgate Raiders men's ice hockey season =

- Conference: 3rd ECAC Hockey
- Home ice: Class of 1965 Arena

Rankings
- USCHO: NR
- USA Hockey: NR

Record
- Overall: 16–16–4
- Conference: 13–7–2
- Home: 9–8–2
- Road: 7–8–2

Coaches and captains
- Head coach: Mike Harder
- Assistant coaches: Zach Badalamenti; Anthony Walsh; Chris Nell
- Captain: Pierson Brandon
- Alternate captain(s): Reid Irwin; Ross Mitton

The 2023–24 Colgate Raiders Men's ice hockey season was the 94th season of play for the program and the 63rd in the ECAC Hockey conference. The Raiders represented Colgate University, played their home games at the Class of 1965 Arena and were coached by Mike Harder in his 1st season.

== Season ==
After 30 seasons behind the bench for the Raiders, Don Vaughan retired following his first conference tournament championship. A few months later, the school decided to bring back former assistant and team captain Mike Harder as the program's 15th head coach. Harder began with a solid foundation as most of the team's roster returned, however, he would have to find a way to replace some missing offense. Three of the Raiders' top four scorers had departed, however, as Colgate was already one of the better offensive teams in the conference, they were well-positioned to handle that loss.

The team encountered difficulty early in the season but, surprisingly, it was the defense that appeared to be the culprit. Carter Gylander had an up-and-down start to his season and was unable to string together a consistent run of solid goaltending. With the offense still a work in progress, the team hovered around .500 for the first half of the season despite playing a relatively easy schedule.

After returning from the winter break, the layoff of more than a month didn't appear to help the Raiders and they went winless in their first four games in January. With the season starting to spiral out of control, Colgate recovered against defending national champions Quinnipiac with a surprising 2–1 win in the middle of the month. That proved to be the turning point of the season as Gylander began looking like the starting goaltender that he was and returned to his 2023 form for the remainder of the season. The offense began to function as a cohesive unit in the second half as well. Though the Raiders didn't have the same top-end scoring they did in '23, the team had greater depth to its offense and ended the year averaging nearly half a goal per game better than it had the year before.

Colgate nearly ran through their conference schedule in the latter half of the year, ending the regular season on a 10–3–1 run. As the wins piled up, the Raiders shot up the conference standings. Though hey barely missed out on a 2nd-place finish, the Raiders not only received a bye into the quarterfinal round, but they would kick of the defense of their conference championship at home. When Colgate got back on the ice, they hit the ground running against St. Lawrence. The Raiders were by far the more aggressive team in the first but the Larries were kept in the game by a stellar performance from their goaltender. SLU took advantage of a lull by Colgate in the second to score 2 goals in quick succession but the Raiders were able to recover in the third. Tommy Bergsland had a hand in 2 markers for Colgate to even the score and force overtime. The offense continued to assault the Saints' net in extra time but they could not find the winning goal. It took until the middle of the second overtime for the game to be decided, however, a seemingly harmless shot from the point was not be picked up by Gylander and found its way into the goal. The rematch saw Colgate's offense provide a consistent barrage on the St. Lawrence cage but the opposing goaltender remained stout. Colgate opened the scoring but were again down when the third period began. Ryan McGuire's power play marker even the score but, less than three minutes later, SLU's surging offense netted the go-ahead goal and the Raiders were unable to respond. The final 10 minutes of the game passed without any further scoring and Colgate's season ended with a disappointing thud.

== Departures ==
Player	Position	Nationality	Cause
Jack Hoey	Forward	United States	Graduation (retired)
Anthony Stark	Defenseman	United States	Graduate transfer to Augustana
Arnaud Vachon	Forward	Canada	Graduate transfer to Augustana
Matthew Verboon	Forward	Switzerland	Graduation (signed with HC Lugano)
Liam Watson-Brawn	Defenseman	Canada	Graduation (retired)
Alex Young	Forward	Canada	Transferred to Arizona State
Colton Young	Forward	Canada	Graduation (signed with Greenville Swamp Rabbits)

== Recruiting ==
Player	Position	Nationality	Age	Notes
Brett Chorske	Forward	United States	22	Edina, MN; transfer from Colorado College
Dominic Foglia	Defenseman	United States	21	Tinton Falls, NJ
Robby Newton	Forward	United States	22	Milwaukee, WI; transfer from Wisconsin
Niko Rexine	Forward	United States	21	Syracuse, NY
Ryan Sullivan	Forward	Canada	21	Calgary, AB
Sebastian Tamburro	Forward	Canada	20	Toronto, ON

== Roster ==
As of September 19, 2023.

No.	Nat.	Player	Class	Pos	Height	Weight	DoB	Hometown	Previous team	NHL rights
1	(United States)	Andrew Takacs	Sophomore	G	6' 2" (1.88 m)	190 lb (86 kg)	2001-02-27	Bowie, Maryland	New Jersey Titans (NAHL)	—
2	(United States)	Pierson Brandon (C)	Senior	D	6' 0" (1.83 m)	180 lb (82 kg)	2000-06-26	Irvington, New York	Aberdeen Wings (NAHL)	—
4	(Canada)	Reid Irwin	Senior	D	6' 1" (1.85 m)	192 lb (87 kg)	1999-03-01	Victoria, British Columbia	Denver (NCHC)	—
6	(United States)	Bobby Metz	Sophomore	D	5' 9" (1.75 m)	178 lb (81 kg)	2001-08-20	Bloomfield Hills, Michigan	Minnesota Wilderness (NAHL)	—
7	(Canada)	Simon Labelle	Sophomore	F	5' 10" (1.78 m)	175 lb (79 kg)	2002-09-03	Ottawa, Ontario	Prince George Spruce Kings (BCHL)	—
8	(United States)	P. J. Garrett	Senior	D	6' 4" (1.93 m)	210 lb (95 kg)	2000-01-17	Duxbury, Massachusetts	Powell River Kings (BCHL)	—
9	(United States)	Nic Belpedio	Junior	D	5' 10" (1.78 m)	194 lb (88 kg)	2001-10-09	Skokie, Illinois	Waterloo Black Hawks (USHL)	—
11	(United States)	Niko Rexine	Freshman	F	6' 2" (1.88 m)	195 lb (88 kg)	2002-06-20	Syracuse, New York	Muskegon Lumberjacks (USHL)	—
12	(Canada)	Daniel Panetta	Sophomore	F	5' 10" (1.78 m)	175 lb (79 kg)	2001-05-20	Belleville, Ontario	Salmon Arm Silverbacks (BCHL)	—
13	(Canada)	Sebastian Tamburro	Sophomore	F	5' 10" (1.78 m)	180 lb (82 kg)	2002-03-04	Toronto, Ontario	Bonnyville Pontiacs (AJHL)	—
14	(Canada)	Ethan Manderville	Graduate	F	6' 4" (1.93 m)	225 lb (102 kg)	2000-07-01	Ottawa, Ontario	Ottawa Jr. Senators (CCHL)	—
15	(United States)	Dom Foglia	Freshman	D	6' 1" (1.85 m)	190 lb (86 kg)	2002-04-09	Tinton Falls, New Jersey	Philadelphia Rebels (NAHL)	—
16	(Canada)	Ryan Sullivan	Freshman	F	6' 2" (1.88 m)	190 lb (86 kg)	2002-05-15	Calgary, Alberta	Camrose Kodiaks (AJHL)	—
17	(United States)	Ross Mitton	Senior	F	5' 10" (1.78 m)	185 lb (84 kg)	2000-07-05	Copiague Harbor, New York	Omaha Lancers (USHL)	—
18	(United States)	Ben Raymond	Junior	F	5' 11" (1.8 m)	180 lb (82 kg)	2001-08-22	Newton, Massachusetts	Powell River Kings (BCHL)	—
19	(United States)	Ryan McGuire	Junior	F	6' 2" (1.88 m)	183 lb (83 kg)	2002-07-27	New Canaan, Connecticut	Penticton Vees (BCHL)	—
20	(Canada)	Levi Glasman	Senior	F	6' 2" (1.88 m)	172 lb (78 kg)	1999-07-31	Lacombe, Alberta	Powell River Kings (BCHL)	—
22	(United States)	Robby Newton	Sophomore	F	5' 9" (1.75 m)	190 lb (86 kg)	2001-07-16	Milwaukee, Wisconsin	Wisconsin (Big Ten)	—
23	(United States)	Owen Neuharth	Sophomore	F	5' 11" (1.8 m)	177 lb (80 kg)	2001-10-25	Savage, Minnesota	Fairbanks Ice Dogs (NAHL)	—
24	(United States)	Jake Schneider	Freshman	F	5' 11" (1.8 m)	198 lb (90 kg)	2002-12-24	Plymouth, Minnesota	Prince George Spruce Kings (BCHL)	—
25	(United States)	Tommy Bergsland	Junior	D	6' 3" (1.91 m)	185 lb (84 kg)	2001-03-23	Minnetrista, Minnesota	Bismarck Bobcats (NAHL)	—
27	(United States)	Nick Anderson	Senior	D	5' 10" (1.78 m)	165 lb (75 kg)	1999-01-04	Independence, Minnesota	Sioux Falls Stampede (USHL)	—
28	(Canada)	Alex DiPaolo	Junior	F	6' 1" (1.85 m)	188 lb (85 kg)	2000-04-28	Oakville, Ontario	Victoria Grizzlies (BCHL)	—
29	(United States)	Brett Chorske	Junior	F	6' 6" (1.98 m)	193 lb (88 kg)	2001-05-24	Edina, Minnesota	Colorado College (NCHC)	—
35	(United States)	Nick Haas	Sophomore	G	6' 4" (1.93 m)	195 lb (88 kg)	2001-11-11	Buffalo, New York	Chippewa Steel (NAHL)	—
37	(Canada)	Carter Gylander	Senior	G	6' 5" (1.96 m)	185 lb (84 kg)	2001-06-05	Beaumont, Alberta	Sherwood Park Crusaders (AJHL)	DET, 191st overall 2019

== Standings ==
2023–24 ECAC Hockey Standings
	Conference record										Overall record					
	GP	W	L	T	OTW	OTL	SW	PTS	GF	GA	GP	W	L	T	GF	GA
#6 Quinnipiac †	22	17	4	1	0	2	0	54	99	39	39	27	10	2	160	79
#9 Cornell *	22	12	6	4	1	2	3	44	74	45	35	22	7	6	115	65
Colgate	22	13	7	2	2	2	2	43	85	68	36	16	16	4	120	112
Dartmouth	22	9	6	7	1	1	3	37	66	60	32	13	10	9	92	91
Clarkson	22	12	9	1	4	2	1	36	62	58	35	18	16	1	95	97
Union	22	9	10	3	1	1	2	32	75	75	37	16	18	3	123	121
St. Lawrence	22	8	10	4	1	1	1	29	49	64	39	14	19	6	90	118
Harvard	22	6	10	6	1	2	3	28	49	64	32	7	19	6	70	106
Princeton	22	8	11	3	4	0	2	25	70	90	30	10	16	4	89	114
Yale	22	7	13	2	1	2	1	25	46	57	30	10	18	2	63	91
Brown	22	6	14	2	2	3	1	22	43	69	30	8	19	3	61	98
Rensselaer	22	6	13	3	0	0	0	21	58	89	37	10	23	4	93	150
Championship: March 23, 2024 † indicates conference regular season champion (Cleary Cup) * indicates conference tournament champion (Whitelaw Cup); Rankings: USCHO.com Top 20 Poll

== Schedule and results ==
Date	Time	Opponent^{#}	Rank^{#}	Site	TV	Decision	Result	Attendance	Record
Regular Season
October 7	7:00 pm	Connecticut*		Class of 1965 Arena • Hamilton, New York	ESPN+	Gylander	L 2–4	923	0–1–0
October 8	3:00 pm	Connecticut*		Class of 1965 Arena • Hamilton, New York	ESPN+	Gylander	T 3–3 ^{OT}	792	0–1–1
October 13	7:00 pm	at Sacred Heart*		Martire Family Arena • Fairfield, Connecticut	FloHockey, SNY	Gylander	W 3–2	4,165	1–1–1
October 14	7:00 pm	at Sacred Heart*		Martire Family Arena • Fairfield, Connecticut	FloHockey, SNY	Gylander	W 6–1	3,703	2–1–1
October 20	7:00 pm	Massachusetts Lowell*		Class of 1965 Arena • Hamilton, New York	ESPN+	Gylander	L 2–4	847	2–2–1
October 21	7:00 pm	Massachusetts Lowell*		Class of 1965 Arena • Hamilton, New York	ESPN+	Takacs	L 2–5	926	2–3–1
November 3	7:00 pm	at Brown		Meehan Auditorium • Providence, Rhode Island	ESPN+	Gylander	L 1–3	577	2–4–1 (0–1–0)
November 4	7:00 pm	at Yale		Ingalls Rink • New Haven, Connecticut	ESPN+	Gylander	W 7–1	1,393	3–4–1 (1–1–0)
November 10	7:00 pm	Harvard		Class of 1965 Arena • Hamilton, New York	ESPN+	Gylander	T 2–2 ^{SOW}	1,241	3–4–2 (1–1–1)
November 11	7:00 pm	Dartmouth		Class of 1965 Arena • Hamilton, New York	ESPN+	Gylander	L 2–3	987	3–5–2 (1–2–1)
November 17	7:00 pm	at Princeton		Hobey Baker Memorial Rink • Princeton, New Jersey	ESPN+	Gylander	W 6–3	2,040	4–5–2 (2–2–1)
November 18	7:00 pm	at #7 Quinnipiac		M&T Bank Arena • Hamden, Connecticut	ESPN+	Gylander	L 4–7	2,802	4–6–2 (2–3–1)
November 24	7:00 pm	Niagara*		Class of 1965 Arena • Hamilton, New York	ESPN+	Gylander	L 2–5	804	4–7–2
November 25	7:00 pm	Niagara*		Class of 1965 Arena • Hamilton, New York	ESPN+	Takacs	W 2–1	603	5–7–2
December 1	7:00 pm	#16 Cornell		Class of 1965 Arena • Hamilton, New York	ESPN+	Gylander	L 2–4	2,198	5–8–2 (2–4–1)
December 2	7:00 pm	at #16 Cornell		Lynah Rink • Ithaca, New York	ESPN+	Gylander	W 4–2	4,316	6–8–2 (3–4–1)
January 5	7:00 pm	at #7 Maine*		Alfond Arena • Orono, Maine	ESPN+	Gylander	L 1–3	4,785	6–9–2
January 6	7:00 pm	at #7 Maine*		Alfond Arena • Orono, Maine	ESPN+	Gylander	T 4–4 ^{OT}	5,043	6–9–3
January 12	7:00 pm	at Long Island*		Northwell Health Ice Center • East Meadow, New York	ESPN+	Gylander	L 2–3 ^{OT}	650	6–10–3
January 13	2:00 pm	at Long Island*		Northwell Health Ice Center • East Meadow, New York	ESPN+	Haas	L 2–3 ^{OT}	450	6–11–3
January 19	7:00 pm	#3 Quinnipiac		Class of 1965 Arena • Hamilton, New York	ESPN+	Gylander	W 2–1	1,008	7–11–3 (4–4–1)
January 20	7:00 pm	Princeton		Class of 1965 Arena • Hamilton, New York	ESPN+	Gylander	W 6–3	908	8–11–3 (5–4–1)
January 26	7:00 pm	at Dartmouth		Thompson Arena • Hanover, New Hampshire	ESPN+	Gylander	W 4–3 ^{OT}	1,374	9–11–3 (6–4–1)
January 27	7:00 pm	at Harvard		Bright-Landry Hockey Center • Boston, Massachusetts	ESPN+	Gylander	L 3–6	3,095	9–12–3 (6–5–1)
February 2	7:00 pm	Clarkson		Class of 1965 Arena • Hamilton, New York	ESPN+	Gylander	W 4–2	1,531	10–12–3 (7–5–1)
February 3	7:00 pm	St. Lawrence		Class of 1965 Arena • Hamilton, New York	ESPN+	Gylander	W 3–2	1,087	11–12–3 (8–5–1)
February 9	7:00 pm	at Union		Achilles Rink • Schenectady, New York	ESPN+	Gylander	L 3–5	1,992	11–13–3 (8–6–1)
February 10	7:00 pm	at Rensselaer		Houston Field House • Troy, New York	ESPN+	Gylander	T 5–5 ^{SOW}	4,290	11–13–4 (8–6–2)
February 16	7:00 pm	Yale		Class of 1965 Arena • Hamilton, New York	ESPN+	Gylander	W 5–2	897	12–13–4 (9–6–2)
February 17	7:00 pm	Brown		Class of 1965 Arena • Hamilton, New York	ESPN+	Gylander	W 4–2	1,059	13–13–4 (10–6–2)
February 23	7:00 pm	at St. Lawrence		Appleton Arena • Canton, New York	ESPN+	Gylander	L 3–4 ^{OT}	1,328	13–14–4 (10–7–2)
February 24	7:00 pm	at Clarkson		Cheel Arena • Potsdam, New York	ESPN+	Gylander	W 4–3 ^{OT}	2,498	14–14–4 (11–7–2)
March 1	7:00 pm	Rensselaer		Class of 1965 Arena • Hamilton, New York	ESPN+	Takacs	W 6–2	908	15–14–4 (12–7–2)
March 2	7:00 pm	Union		Class of 1965 Arena • Hamilton, New York	ESPN+	Gylander	W 4–3	1,100	16–14–4 (13–7–2)
ECAC Hockey Tournament
March 15	7:00 pm	St. Lawrence*		Class of 1965 Arena • Hamilton, New York (Quarterfinal Game 1)	ESPN+	Gylander	L 2–3 ^{2OT}	763	16–15–4
March 16	7:00 pm	St. Lawrence*		Class of 1965 Arena • Hamilton, New York (Quarterfinal Game 2)	ESPN+	Gylander	L 2–3	834	16–16–4
*Non-conference game. ^{#}Rankings from USCHO.com Poll. All times are in Eastern Time. Source:

== Scoring statistics ==
Name	Position	Games	Goals	Assists	Points	PIM
Ross Mitton	F	34	11	19	30	14
Daniel Panetta	C	36	13	16	29	6
Brett Chorske	C/RW	35	7	20	27	6
Simon Labelle	LW	36	7	20	27	17
Ryan McGuire	C	34	14	12	26	31
Tommy Bergsland	D	36	5	21	26	16
Alex DiPaolo	LW	26	12	11	23	16
Nick Anderson	D	36	2	19	21	35
Ethan Manderville	C	36	9	10	19	10
Jake Schneider	RW	35	9	9	18	12
Pierson Brandon	D	34	5	10	15	37
Ryan Sullivan	F	35	6	7	13	16
Reid Irwin	D/C	36	3	10	13	24
Ben Raymond	C/LW	35	4	7	11	6
Dom Foglia	D	24	2	4	6	4
Levi Glasman	LW	33	1	5	6	6
Nic Belpedio	D	9	3	2	5	2
Sebastian Tamburro	LW	13	1	4	5	4
Niko Rexine	C	31	2	2	4	4
Bobby Metz	D	36	2	2	4	2
Robby Newton	F	36	2	1	3	25
Carter Gylander	G	32	0	1	1	0
Nick Haas	G	1	0	0	0	0
Andrew Takacs	G	3	0	0	0	0
Owen Neuharth	C	12	0	0	0	4
Total			120	212	332	303

== Goaltending statistics ==
Name	Games	Minutes	Wins	Losses	Ties	Goals against	Saves	Shut outs	SV %	GAA
Andrew Takacs	4	176:45	2	1	0	7	67	0	.905	2.38
Nick Haas	2	63:52	0	1	0	3	28	0	.903	2.82
Carter Gylander	32	1963:35	14	14	4	96	871	0	.901	2.93
Empty Net	-	22:01	-	-	-	6	-	-	-	-
Total	36	2226:13	16	16	4	112	966	0	.896	3.02

== Rankings ==
Poll	Week																										
Poll	Pre	1	2	3	4	5	6	7	8	9	10	11	12	13	14	15	16	17	18	19	20	21	22	23	24	25	26 (Final)
USCHO.com	NR	NR	NR	NR	NR	NR	NR	NR	NR	NR	NR	–	NR	NR	NR	NR	NR	NR	NR	NR	NR	NR	NR	NR	NR	–	NR
USA Hockey	NR	NR	NR	NR	NR	NR	NR	NR	NR	NR	NR	NR	–	NR	NR	NR	NR	NR	NR	NR	NR	NR	NR	NR	NR	NR	NR

Note: USCHO did not release a poll in weeks 11 and 25.
Note: USA Hockey did not release a poll in week 12.

== Awards and honors ==
Player	Award	Ref
Tommy Bergsland	ECAC Hockey Second Team	
Jake Schneider	ECAC Hockey Rookie Team	
