= 2010–11 Austrian National League season =

The 2010–11 Austrian National League season was contested by eight teams, and saw VEU Feldkirch win the championship. The top four teams from the regular season qualified for Group A of the placing round. The bottom four teams took part in Group B. All four teams from Group A qualified for the playoffs, along with the top three teams from Group B.

== First round ==
	Team	GP	W	L	OTW	OTL	SOW	SOL	Goals	Diff	Pts
1	HC Innsbruck	28	25	3	2	0	3	1	129:71	+58	71
2	EC Dornbirn	28	21	7	1	1	3	2	139:83	+56	62
3	VEU Feldkirch	28	17	11	2	1	2	1	112:92	+20	49
4	EC Red Bull Salzburg	28	14	14	1	2	0	0	94:92	+2	43
5	ATSE Graz	28	9	19	0	3	0	5	85:96	-11	35
6	EHC Lustenau	28	10	18	3	4	1	2	85:99	-14	32
7	Zeller Eisbären	28	11	17	3	1	2	0	72:107	-35	29
8	EHC Bregenzerwald	28	5	23	0	0	1	1	50:126	-76	15

== Placing round ==
Group A
	Team	GP	W	L	OTW	OTL	SOW	SOL	Goals	Diff	Pts
1	EC Dornbirn	6	5	1	0	0	1	0	26:12	+14	17 (3)
2	VEU Feldkirch	6	4	2	0	1	1	1	24:19	+5	15 (2)
3	HC Innsbruck	6	2	4	1	0	0	0	15:19	-4	9 (4)
4	EC Red Bull Salzburg	6	1	5	0	0	0	1	15:30	-15	5 (1)

Group B
	Team	GP	W	L	OTW	OTL	SOW	SOL	Goals	Diff	Pts
1	ATSE Graz	6	4	2	0	0	0	0	15:10	+5	16 (4)
2	EHC Lustenau	6	4	2	0	0	0	0	16:10	+6	15 (3)
3	Zeller Eisbären	6	3	3	0	0	1	0	13:15	-2	10 (2)
4	EHC Bregenzerwald	6	1	5	0	0	0	1	10:19	-9	5 (1)

== Playoffs ==
=== Quarterfinals ===
Teams	Series	Game 1	Game 2	Spiel 3	Game 4	Game 5
VEU Feldkirch (2) – Zeller Eisbären (7)	3:1	4:1 (1:0, 2:0, 1:1)	1:3 (0:1, 0:1, 1:1)	6:0 (2:0, 3:0, 1:0)	7:1 (1:1, 2:0, 4:0)	–
HC Innsbruck (3) – EHC Lustenau (6)	3:0	5:2 (1:2, 2:0, 2:0)	4:1 (0:0, 2:1, 2:0)	3:0 (1:0, 1:0, 1:0)	–	–
EC Red Bull Salzburg II (4) – ATSE Graz (5)	0:3	2:5 (0:1, 1:3, 1:1)	2:6 (0:2, 2:2, 0:2)	1:2 (0:1, 1:1, 0:0)	–	–

=== Semifinals ===
Teams	Series	Game 1	Game 2	Spiel 3	Game 4	Game 5
EC Dornbirn (1) – ATSE Graz (5)	3:2	4:1 (1:1, 3:0, 0:0)	2:3 SO (1:1, 0:1, 1:0, 0:0, 0:1)	1:4 (0:0, 1:3, 0:1)	3:0 (2:0, 1:0, 0:0)	5:1 (1:1, 1:0, 3:0)
VEU Feldkirch (2) – HC Innsbruck (3)	3:2	2:1 (1:0, 0:0, 1:1)	2:4 (0:2,1:2,1:0)	1:4 (0:0, 1:1, 0:3)	5:2 (2:0, 2:1, 1:1)	4:3 (2:0, 2:1, 0:2)

=== Final ===
Teams	Series	Game 1	Game 2	Spiel 3	Game 4	Game 5
EC Dornbirn (1) – VEU Feldkirch (2)	0:3	3:4 (1:1, 0:2, 2:1)	2:3 (1:0, 1:1, 1:1)	2:3 OT (1:2, 0:0, 1:0, 0:1)	–	–
