= EHC Team Wien =

- City: Vienna, Austria
- League: Austrian National League
- Founded: 2007
- Home arena: Schultz Halle
- Colours: Red, White

EHC Team Wien is an ice hockey team in Vienna, Austria. They play in the Austrian National League, the second level of ice hockey in Austria. The club was founded in 2007.
