= 2000–01 Austrian Hockey League season =

Austrian hockey season

The 2000–01 Austrian Hockey League season was the 71st season of the Austrian Hockey League, the top level of ice hockey in Austria. 10 teams participated in the league, and EC KAC won the championship.

== Regular season ==
Place	Team	GP	W	L (OTL)	GF–GA	Pts
1	EC KAC	36	31	5 (1)	202:61	49
2	EC VSV	36	28	8 (2)	194:84	44
3	EHC Black Wings Linz	36	25	11 (3)	144:94	40
4	HC Innsbruck	36	19	17 (2)	136:148	30
5	EC Graz 99ers	36	17	19 (2)	113:139	28
6	EK Zell am See	36	16	20 (4)	136:151	27
7	EHC Lustenau	36	15	21 (4)	130:145	25
8	EC Kapfenberg	36	14	22 (5)	106:150	24
9	EV Zeltweg	36	10	26 (4)	114:190	20
10	DEK Klagenfurt	36	5	31 (4)	86:199	9

== Playoffs ==
Quarterfinals
1	EC KAC	3
5	EC Graz 99ers	0
4	HC Innsbruck	2
8	KSV Eishockeyklub	3
2	EC VSV	3
6	EK Zell am See	1
3	EHCBlack Wings Linz	3
7	EHC Lustenau	2

Semifinals
1	EC KAC	3
8	KSV Eishockeyklub	1
2	EC VSV	3
3	EHCBlack Wings Linz	1

Finals
1	EC KAC	4
2	EC VSV	2
