= Graz 99ers =

Moser Medical Graz99ers
- City: Graz, Styria, Austria
- League: Austrian National League; 1999–2000; ICE Hockey League; 2000–present
- Founded: 1999; 27 years ago
- Home arena: Eisstadion Graz Liebenau (Capacity: 4,050)
- Colors
- Owner: Herbert Jerich
- Head coach: Johan Pennerborn
- Captain: Vacant
- Website: 99ers.at

Franchise history
- 1999–2010: Graz 99ers
- 2010–2020: Moser Medical Graz 99ers
- 2020–present: Moser Medical Graz99ers

Championships
- Austrian Champions: 1 (2026)

The Moser Medical Graz99ers are an Austrian professional ice hockey team from Graz, Styria. The club was founded in 1999 after the previous club, EHC Graz, folded prior to the 1998–99 season due to financial difficulties. The Graz99ers started in the 1999–2000 season in the Austrian National League, Austria's second division, where they were crowned instant champions. Since the 2000–01 season they have been playing in the ICE Hockey League (ICEHL).

== History ==
=== Forerunners ===
Hockey was played at the premier level in Graz mainly by two predecessor clubs. The hockey department of the ATSE Graz (Workers' Gymnastics and Sports Association Eggenberg) was founded in 1947 and won the city's only top-flight national hockey titles to date in the 1974–75 and 1977–78 season. The club was merged early nineties with the UEC Graz, shortly after the EC Graz emerged. In 2008, the hockey section of was ATSE Graz reactivated on the league level.

The EC Graz (also called the Elephants) experienced under president Hannes Kartnig its heyday, finishing three times the runner-up title in the seasons 1991–92, 1992–93 and 1993–94 despite running at a high financial cost. After the departure of Hannes Kartnig, the football club SK Sturm Graz changed, they tried to rescue EC Graz. When this plan failed, EHC Graz was established in 1998, only to become bankrupt the same year.

=== Establishment and promotion to the Bundesliga ===
In 1999 Jochen Pildner-Steinburg founded the Graz 99ers as the successor club to EC Graz to keep professional hockey in the Styrian capital. The team premiered in the second division, the Austrian National League, finishing after 28 rounds played, in first place in the table. In the semifinals, the team continued after opening game defeat to persevere to a three games to one series win against the EHC Lustenau to meet EK Zell am See in the final. The series was decided in four games with Graz taking advantage of the opportunity for promotion to the Austrian Hockey League.

== Players ==
=== Current roster ===
Updated 19 June 2025.

No.	Nat	Player	Pos	S/G	Age	Acquired	Birthplace
20	(Austria)	Nico Brunner	D	L	33	2024	Villach, Austria
–	(Canada)	Chris Collins	C	L	34	2025	Calgary, Alberta, Canada
–	(Austria)	Nico Feldner	C	R	27	2025	Hall in Tirol, Austria
17	(Austria)	Manuel Ganahl	RW	L	36	2024	Bludenz, Austria
77	(United States)	Trevor Gooch	C	L	31	2024	Mantua, New Jersey, United States
37	(Sweden)	Jonas Gunnarsson	G	L	34	2024	Eksjö, Sweden
8	(Austria)	Markus Hanl	F	R	23	2022	Judenburg, Austria
40	(Austria)	Tim Harnisch	C	L	25	2024	Wiener Neustadt, Austria
21	(Austria)	Lukas Haudum	C	L	29	2024	Linz, Austria
4	(Germany)	Korbinian Holzer (C)	D	R	38	2024	Munich, Germany
3	(United States)	Frank Hora	D	R	30	2024	Cheektowaga, New York, United States
52	(Austria)	Paul Huber	F	L	26	2024	Graz, Austria
19	(Austria)	Lukas Kainz	C	L	30	2024	Mödling, Austria
–	(Denmark)	Anders Koch	D	L	28	2025	Esbjerg, Denmark
89	(Austria)	Clemens Krainz	F	R	25	2018	Zell am See, Austria
28	(Austria)	Lenz Moosbrugger	F	L	21	2024	Lustenau, Austria
82	(Austria)	Paul Reiner	D	R	20	2022	Graz, Austria
23	(Canada)	Kevin Roy	C	L	33	2024	Longueuil, Quebec, Canada
13	(Austria)	Michael Schiechl (A)	C	L	37	2020	Judenburg, Austria
–	(Austria)	Paul Stapelfeldt	D	L	27	2025	Braunau am Inn, Austria
–	(United States)	Nick Swaney	RW	R	28	2025	Lakeville, Minnesota, United States
12	(Canada)	Marcus Vela	C	R	29	2024	Burnaby, British Columbia, Canada
30	(Austria)	Nicolas Wieser	G	L	28	2022	Villach, Austria
14	(Austria)	Kilian Zündel	D	R	25	2024	Dornbirn, Austria

=== Notable alumni ===
- Steve Brûlé
- Dave Chyzowski
- Greg Day
- Scott Fankhouser
- Jiří Hála
- Rob Hisey
- Tommy Jakobsen
- Ivo Jan
- Rumun Ndur
- Doug Nolan
- Steve Passmore
- Marcel Rodman
- Sean Selmser
- Thomas Vanek
