= HC Tigers =

- City: Dornbirn, Austria
- League: Oberliga
- Founded: 1985; 41 years ago
- Home arena: Messestadion
- Colours: Green, black
- Website: Official website

Franchise history
- 1985–2015: EHC Bregenzerwald
- 2015–2026: EC Bregenzerwald
- 2026–Present: HC Tigers

The HC Tigers are a professional ice hockey team in Bregenzerwald, Austria. The club was founded in 1985.

== Honours ==
- Inter-National League:
  - Winners (2): 2012–13, 2015–16
  - Runners-up (1): 2013–14
