= EV Aicall Zeltweg =

- City: Zeltweg, Austria
- League: Austrian National League
- Founded: 1950
- Home arena: Aichfeldhalle
- Colours: Orange, Black, White

Franchise history
- 1950-2007: EV Zeltweg
- 2007-: EV Aicall Zeltweg

EV Aicall Zeltweg is an ice hockey team in Zeltweg, Austria. They play in the Austrian National League, the second level of ice hockey in Austria.

== History ==
The club was created as EV Zeltweg in 1950. In 2007, they changed their name to EV Aicall Zeltweg.
