= ATSE Graz =

- City: Graz, Austria
- League: Eliteliga
- Founded: 1947; 79 years ago
- Home arena: Eisstadion Graz Liebenau
- Colours: Red, White, Blue
- Website: http://atse-eissport.at/ (offline)

ATSE Graz is an ice hockey team in Graz, Austria. They play in the Eliteliga, the third level of ice hockey in Austria.

== History ==
The club was founded in 1947, and won the Austrian Hockey League in 1975 and 1978. The club was merged with UEC Graz into EC Graz in 1990. In 2008, they were revived, and began playing in the Austrian Oberliga. ATSE won the Oberliga in 2009, and were promoted to the Nationalliga for 2010. After failing to win in the Play-Off, ATSE retreated from the Nationalliga, starting to play in the Styrian Eliteliga.

Hans Dobida played with ATSE Graz for five seasons as a young adult, then later served as head of section at ATSE Graz for almost 40 years.

== Achievements ==
- Austrian champion: 1975, 1978.
- Austrian National League champion: 1963, 1966, 1981.
- Austrian Oberliga champion: 2009.
- Styrian Eliteliga champion: 2016
