= HC TWK Innsbruck =

HC TIWAG Innsbruck – Die Haie
- City: Innsbruck, Tyrol, Austria
- League: Austrian National League; 1995–2001; 2009–2012; ICE Hockey League; 2001–2009; 2012–present
- Founded: 1994; 32 years ago
- Home arena: TIWAG Arena (Capacity: 3,200)
- Colors
- Owner: Dr. Markus Knoll
- General manager: Günther Hanschitz
- Head coach: Ryan Kinasewich
- Captain: Jan Lattner
- Website: www.hcinnsbruck.at

Franchise history
- 1994–1999: HC TIWAG Innsbruck - Die Haie
- 1999–: HC Tiroler Wasserkraft Innsbruck

HC TIWAG Innsbruck – Die Haie is an Austrian professional ice hockey team in the ICE Hockey League (ICEHL). They play their home games at TIWAG Arena in Innsbruck.

== History ==
The club was founded in 1994 as HC Innsbruck and in 1999 with the introduction of wealthy sponsor "Tyrolean Hydropower" were renamed to HC Tiroler Wasserkraft Innsbruck. Since the 2000–01 season the Sharks were playing in the highest Austrian league and was the first Innsbruck team in the first division since the exit of EV Innsbruck upon completion of the 1992–93 season.

Over the years, the team reached the semi-finals on multiple occasions, however, never made it to the finals. In recent seasons, the majority of the squad has often been replaced, but this was reflected on the budget constraints. In addition, the team failed to win in the final stages of the season, year after year, repeated regularly and culminated in the early playoff exits.

On 3 March 2009, Innsbruck announced its intention to leave the Erste Bank Hockey League for financial reasons and resume play in the second tier, the Austrian National League.

Their return season in the new league was completed with a successful squad that consisted mainly of young Tyrolean players. The club finished the regular season first, seven points ahead of the runner-up Dornbirner EC. In the final Innsbruck were defeated by the Vorarlbergians, losing the series 3 games to 1. Two years later, the club succeeded in winning the second division National League Championship, for the first time in franchise history. A short time later it was announced that Innsbruck would return to the top-flight EBEL league.

== Venue ==
The Innsbruck Sharks' home games are played at the Olympia World Innsbruck complex, which hosted the Winter Olympic Games in 1964 and 1976. Innsbruck have the luxury to play at two home venues within the complex, after first primarily using the Olympiahalle Innsbruck which seated approximately 8,000, which was renovated for the 2005 IIHF World Championship.

In 2005, the Sharks moved to also play in the smaller capacity and purpose built TIWAG Arena which seats 3,200. The Olympiahalle is now used sparingly, specially to cater for larger crowds on important rival games or playoff games.

== Players ==
=== Current roster ===
Updated 6 November 2023.

No.	Nat	Player	Pos	S/G	Age	Acquired	Birthplace
6	(United States)	Nick Albano	D	R	30	2023	Beverly, Massachusetts, US
89	(Austria)	Lukas Bär	LW	L	29	2017	Innsbruck, Austria
29	(Canada)	Evan Buitenhuis	G	L	33	2023	Burlington, Ontario, Canada
9	(United States)	Gordie Green	RW	R	29	2023	Ann Arbor, Minnesota, US
23	(Austria)	Franz Hackl	D	R	24	2021	Schwaz, Austria
13	(Canada)	Adam Helewka	LW	L	31	2022	Burnaby, British Columbia, Canada
11	(Austria)	Daniel Jakubitzka	D	L	30	2021	Innsbruck, Austria
63	(Austria)	Noah Kerber	D	L	23	2022	Hall in Tirol, Austria
27	(Denmark)	Anders Krogsgaard	D	R	30	2022	Esbjerg, Denmark
98	(Czech Republic)	Jan Lattner	D	L	36	2019	Znojmo, Czech Republic
26	(Canada)	Daniel Leavens	RW	R	33	2021	Thornhill, Ontario, Canada
57	(Austria)	Luis Ludin	F	L	25	2018	Munich, Germany
81	(United States)	Corey Mackin	C	L	31	2022	Philadelphia, Pennsylvania, United States
44	(Austria)	Thomas Mader	LW	L	31	2020	Mittersill, Austria
33	(United States)	Tom McCollum	G	L	36	2020	Amherst, New York, United States
20	(Austria)	Luca Muigg	F	L	23	2020	Innsbruck, Austria
8	(Austria)	Clemens Paulweber	F	R	29	2014	Innsbruck, Austria
82	(Austria)	Senna Peeters	RW	R	24	2022	Deurne, Belgium
98	(Austria)	Nicholas Schintler	F	L	23	2021	Innsbruck, Austria
12	(United States)	Brady Shaw	RW	L	33	2022	Ottawa, Ontario, Canada
30	(Austria)	Rene Swette	G	L	37	2021	Lustenau, Austria
96	(Austria)	Martin Ulmer	RW	R	38	2021	Dornbirn, Austria
42	(Canada)	Jamal Watson	D/RW	R	31	2022	Calgary, Alberta, Canada
38	(Austria)	Dario Winkler	C	R	29	2020	Hall in Tirol, Austria
