= EHC Lustenau =

- City: Lustenau, Austria
- League: Ö Eishockey Liga
- Founded: 1970; 56 years ago
- Home arena: Rheinhalle Lustenau
- Colours: Green, yellow
- Website: https://www.ehc-lustenau.at/

Eishockey Club Lustenau or simply EHC Lustenau is an Austrian ice hockey team based in Lustenau. Founded in 1970, they play in the Ö Eishockey Liga. Previously, they played in the Alps Hockey League between 2016 and 2024.

== Honours ==
- Austrian National League champions: 1974, 1978, 1982, 1984, 1992, 1997, 2006, 2009
- Inter-National League champions: 2015
- Ö Eishockey Liga champions: 2026
