= Dornbirn Bulldogs =

Austrian hockey club

- City: Dornbirn, Vorarlberg, Austria
- League: Austrian National League; 2001–2012; ICE Hockey League; 2012–2022; Ö Eishockey Liga; 2023–present
- Founded: 1992; 34 years ago
- Home arena: Messestadion (Capacity: 4,270)
- Colors
- Owner: Joe Hagn
- Website: Dornbirn Bulldogs

Franchise history
- 1992–2002: EC Dornbirn
- 2002–2005: EC TRENDamin Dornbirn
- 2005–2008: EC-TREND Dornbirn
- 2008–2017: Dornbirner EC
- 2017–present: Dornbirn Bulldogs

The Dornbirn Bulldogs are an Austrian amateur ice hockey team in Dornbirn, Vorarlberg, Austria, who currently plays in the Ö Eishockey Liga, the third tier of Ice Hockey in Austria, and formerly played in the ICE Hockey League (ICEHL), the first level of ice hockey in Austria, from 2012 until 2022. The club was founded in 1992 and in 2001, began play in the Austrian National League. In their 11 years in the National League, Austria's second-tier league, Dornbirn celebrated two titles in 2008 and 2010.

== History ==
Dornbirner EC was founded in 1992 as the successor of the club EHC Dornbirn and established itself at the beginning primarily as a training club whose various youth teams had regular successes. With the goal of playing professionally at the highest level, the club's management found through affiliated projects with various established teams professional players to help achieve the level of hockey required. In 2001, these efforts bore fruit, as the Club qualified for the first time in the second highest professional level, the Austrian National League.

The first major success of the club's history was the runner-up title in 2004, after winning the regular season, but then falling in the final to EC Salzburg 0: 3. In the 2007–08 season, Dornbirn stood again in the finals and claimed their first national league title in club history against EC Salzburg II. After a runner-up title in the season 2008–09, the Bulldogs were in the following 2009–10 season final to win the title in the National League again.

In the spring of 2012, the Dornbirner EC applied after a long planning phase and secure finances for inclusion in the Erste Bank Hockey League. The application was granted, which marked to first change in the EBEL since 2004 with the departure of the VEU Feldkirch Vorarlberg.

After completion of the 2021–22 season, Dornbirn Bulldogs announced their withdrawal from the following 2022–23 season due to financial constraints and considerations. While continuing the junior development programs, the Bulldogs intend to return to the professional ranks in the 2023–24 season.

=== Name sponsors ===
Dornbirner EC have had several sponsors, whose names have been incorporated into the team's name in the course of its history. For a long time was the full name of the team TRENDamin EC Dornbirn Bulldogs. In 2005 this was shortened to EC-TREND Dornbirn, which remained the official name until 2008. In the 2009–10 season the team was called by its full name hagn_leone EC Dornbirn before reverting to Dornbirner EC. Dornbirn has always had an identifiable nickname in the Bulldogs, which has been used predominantly.

== Players ==
Alternate Logo of the Dornbirn Bulldogs.

=== Team captains ===
- Danny Bois, 2012–13
- Patrick Jarrett, 2013–14
- Nikolas Petrik, 2014–17
- Jamie Arniel, 2017–18
- Olivier Magnan, 2018–21
- Stefan Häussle, 2021–22
