= Austrian National League =

- Sport: Ice hockey
- Founded: 1959
- Folded: 2012
- Country: Austria; Hungary
- Last champion: HC TWK Innsbruck
- Most titles: EHC Lustenau (7)

The Austrian National League (German: Österreichische Eishockey-Nationalliga) was a former second tier ice hockey league in Austria. For the 2012–13 season, it was replaced by the Inter-National League.

== Decline ==
With the conclusion of the 2011–12 season, seven of the twelve teams left the league. Two teams, Dornbirner EC and TWK Innsbruck were invited to join the Austrian Hockey League The farm teams of the Vienna Capitals, EC KAC and the EHC Black Wings Linz all withdrew to join a junior Austrian Hockey League. This proved to be the end of the National League. Four of the remaining teams - EK Zell am See, EHC Bregenzerwald, VEU Feldkirch and EHC Lustenau - all subsequently joined the Inter-National League.

== Champions ==
Season	Champions
1959–60	East Wiener EV; West EK Zell am See
1960–61	EK Zell am See
1961–62	East ASKÖ Wien, WAT X West SV Ehrwald; South ATSE Graz
1962–63	ATSE Graz
1963–64	Salzburger EV
1964–65	EC Innsbruck Pradl
1965–66	A ATSE Graz; B ASKÖ Wien
1966–67	A: VEU Feldkirch
1967–68	EC Ehrwald
1968–69	EC Innsbruck Pradl
1969–70	Grazer AK
1970–71	WAT Stadlau
1971–72	HC Salzburg
1972–73	Kapfenberger SV
1973–74	EHC Lustenau
1974–75	EK Zell am See
1975–76	EC VSV
1976–77	EC VSV
1977–78	EHC Lustenau
1978–79	EK Zell am See
1979–80	WAT Stadlau
1980–81	ATSE Graz
1981–82	EHC Lustenau
1982–83	Grazer SV
1983–84	EHC Lustenau
1984–85	Wiener EV
1985–86	EK Zell am See
1986–87	UEC Mödling
1987–88	Kapfenberger SV
1988–89	Kapfenberger SV
1989–90	EK Zell am See
1990–91	EK Zell am See
1991–92	EHC Lustenau
1992–93	EC Ehrwald
1993–94	EV Innsbruck
1994–95	SK DSG Rotschitzen
1995–96	Kitzbühele EC
1996–97	EHC Lustenau
1997–98	DEK Klagenfurt
1998–99	Kapfenberger SV
1999–00	Graz 99ers
2001–02	EC Supergau Feldkirch
2002–03	EK Zell am See
2003–04	Red Bull Salzburg II
2004–05	EK Zell am See
2005–06	EHC Lustenau
2006–07	VEU Feldkirch
2007–08	EC Dornbirn
2008–09	EHC Lustenau
2009–10	EC Dornbirn
2010–11	VEU Feldkirch
2011–12	HC Innsbruck

== See also ==
- Austrian Hockey League
- Inter-National League
