= EK Zeller Eisbären =

Die Zeller Eisbären
- City: Zell am See, Austria
- League: Alps Hockey League
- Founded: 1928; 98 years ago
- Home arena: KE Kelit Arena
- Colours: Blue, yellow
- Head coach: Marcel Rodman
- Website: ek-zellereisbaeren.at

EK Zeller Eisbären, also known as EK Zell am See, is an Austrian professional ice hockey team based in Zell am See. As of the 2026–27 season, they play in the Alps Hockey League. The club was founded in 1928.

== Honours ==
=== International ===
- Alps Hockey League

Winners (1): 2024–25

=== Domestic ===
- Austrian Champions of the Alps Hockey League (second tier)
  - Winners (2): 2022–23, 2025–26
- Austrian National League (second tier)
  - Winners (7): 1960–61, 1978–79, 1985–86, 1989–90, 1990–91, 2002–03, 2004–05
- Austrian Oberliga (second tier)
  - Winners (1): 1974–75
