= List of Cincinnati Cyclones seasons =

This is a list of seasons completed by Cincinnati Cyclones in the teams' history across multiple leagues in the East Coast Hockey League (1990–92), original International Hockey League (1992–2001), and the return to the ECHL (2002–2004, 2006–present).

Note: GP = Games played, W = Wins, L = Losses, T = Ties, OTL = Overtime losses, SOL = Shootout losses, Pts = Points, PCT = Winning percentage, GF = Goals for, GA = Goals against, PIM = Penalty infraction minutes

Cincinnati Cyclones of the ECHL (First edition)
Season	League	Division	GP	W	L	T	OTL	SOL	Pts	PCT	GF	GA	PIM	Coach(es)	Result
1990–91	ECHL	West	64	37	24	0	3	0	77	0.578	285	281	1954	Dennis Desrosiers	Lost in round 1
1991–92	ECHL	West	64	36	20	0	8	0	80	0.562	329	284	2323	Dennis Desrosiers	Lost in round 3

Cincinnati Cyclones of the IHL
Season	League	Division	GP	W	L	T	OTL	SOL	Pts	PCT	GF	GA	PIM	Coach(es)	Result
1992–93	IHL	IHLA	82	27	48	0	7	0	61	0.329	305	364	2388	Dennis Desrosiers	Did not qualify
1993–94	IHL	IHLC	81	49	23	0	9	0	107	0.605	336	282	2214	Dennis Desrosiers, Richard Kromm, Terry Murray	Lost in round 2
1994–95	IHL	Midwest	81	49	22	0	10	0	113	0.605	305	272	2125	Don Jackson	Lost in round 2
1995–96	IHL	IHLN	82	51	22	0	9	0	111	0.622	318	247	1806	Ron Smith	Lost in round 3
1996–97	IHL	IHLN	82	43	29	0	10	0	96	0.524	254	248	1890	Ron Smith	Lost in round 1
1997–98	IHL	IHLC	82	40	30	0	12	0	92	0.488	275	254	1702	Ron Smith	Lost in round 2
1998–99	IHL	IHLNE	82	44	32	0	6	0	94	0.537	269	270	1835	Ron Smith	Lost in round 1
1999–00	IHL	IHLE	82	44	30	0	8	0	96	0.537	244	246	1688	Ron Smith	Lost in round 3
2000–01	IHL	IHLE	82	44	29	0	9	0	97	0.537	267	258	1273	Ron Smith	Lost in round 1

Cincinnati Cyclones of the ECHL (Second edition)
Season	League	Division	GP	W	L	T	OTL	SOL	Pts	PCT	GF	GA	PIM	Coach(es)	Result
2001–02	ECHL	Northwest	72	36	30	6	0	0	78	0.542	210	207	1462	Ray Edwards, Paul Lawless	Lost in round 2
2002–03	ECHL	Northwest	72	36	29	7	0	0	79	0.549	257	236	1686	Malcolm Cameron	Lost in round 3
2003-04	ECHL	Northern	72	25	43	4	0	0	54	0.375	175	223	1308	Chris Cichocki	Did not qualify
2004-05	ECHL	Suspended operations													
2005-06	ECHL	Suspended operations													
2006-07	ECHL	North	72	37	29	—	4	2	80	0.556	213	198	1602	Chuck Weber	Lost in round 3
2007-08	ECHL	North	72	55	11	—	1	4	115	0.799	292	178	1311	Chuck Weber	ECHL Champions
2008-09	ECHL	North	72	41	26	—	2	3	87	0.604	256	231	1391	Chuck Weber	Lost in round 3
2009-10	ECHL	North	72	44	25	—	2	2	91	0.611	253	200	1138	Chuck Weber	ECHL Champions
2010-11	ECHL	North	72	33	29	—	6	4	76	0.528	199	229	1351	Jarrod Skalde	Lost in round 1
2011-12	ECHL	North	72	35	28	—	2	7	79	0.549	228	227	1016	Jarrod Skalde	Did not qualify
2012-13	ECHL	North	72	42	22	—	5	3	92	0.639	227	195	1119	Jarrod Skalde	Lost in round 3
2013-14	ECHL	North	72	41	23	—	4	4	90	0.625	247	204	839	Ben Simon	Lost in round 4
2014–15	ECHL	North	72	31	30	—	2	9	73	0.507	195	212	963	Matt Macdonald	Did not qualify
2015–16	ECHL	Midwest	72	36	27	—	5	4	81	.563	222	210	847	Matt Macdonald	Lost in round 1
2016–17	ECHL	South	72	36	29	—	6	1	79	.549	200	209	949	Matt Macdonald	Did not qualify
2017–18	ECHL	Central	72	39	30	—	3	0	81	.563	226	220	992	Matt Macdonald	Lost in round 1
2018–19	ECHL	Central	72	51	13	—	5	3	110	.764	282	176	1050	Matt Thomas	Lost in round 2
2019–20	ECHL	Central	63	38	17	—	7	1	84	.667	196	161	808	Matt Thomas	Season cancelled
2020–21	ECHL	Opted out of participating due to the COVID-19 pandemic													
2021–22	ECHL	Central	72	36	32	—	3	1	76	.528	243	239	1110	Jason Payne	Lost in round 1
2022–23	ECHL	Central	72	47	16	—	6	3	103	.715	266	216	1262	Jason Payne	Lost in round 2
2023–24	ECHL	Central	72	31	34	—	7	0	69	.479	236	261	1013	Jason Payne	Did not qualify
2024–25	ECHL	Central	72	29	32	—	11	0	69	.479	184	207	811	Jason Payne	Did not qualify

Records as of conclusion of 2024–25 season.
