= Trent Whitfield =

Canadian ice hockey centre (born 1977)

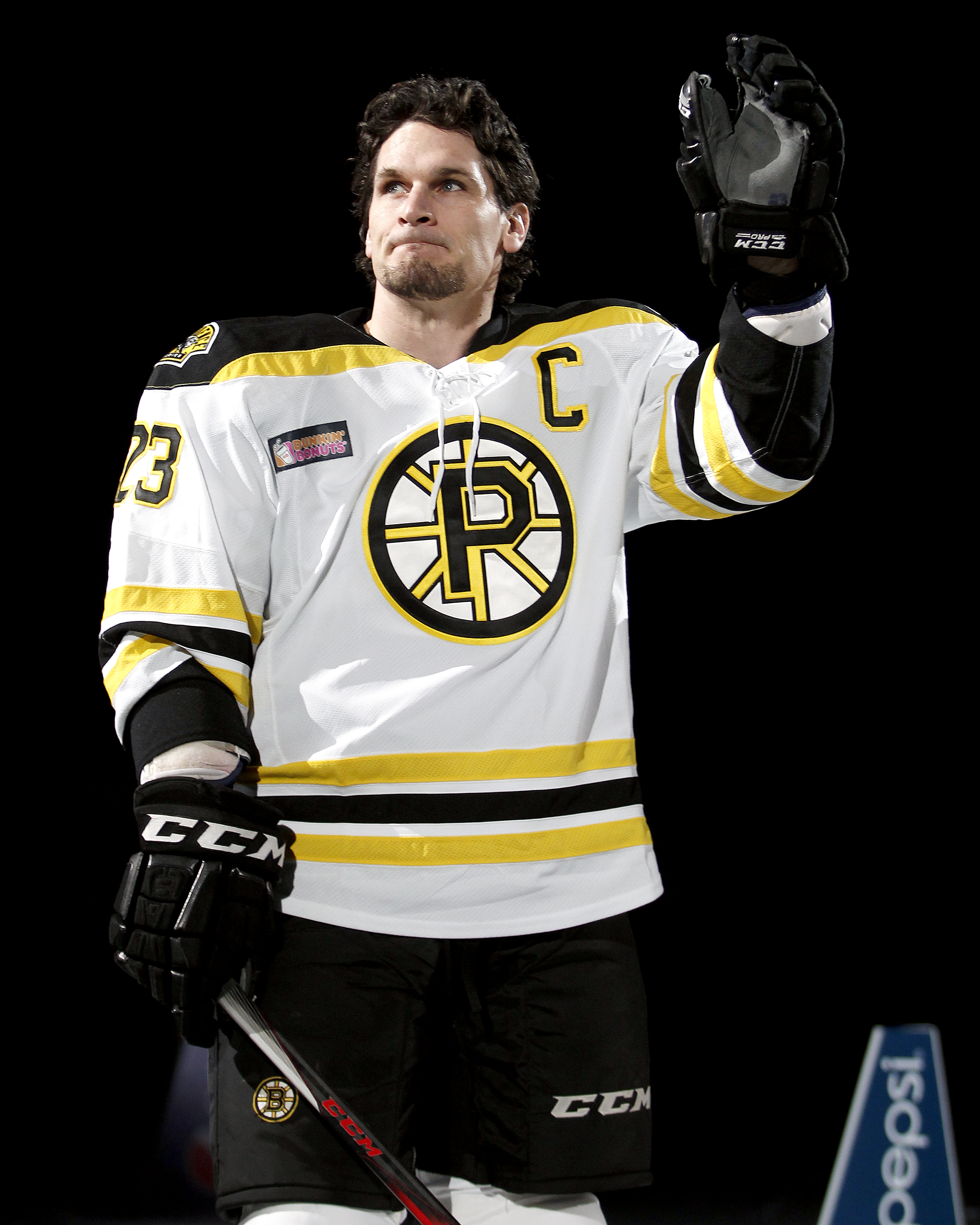
- Whitfield with the Providence Bruins in 2013
- Born: June 17, 1977 (age 49) Alameda, Saskatchewan, Canada
- Height: 5 ft 11 in (180 cm)
- Weight: 209 lb (95 kg; 14 st 13 lb)
- Position: Centre
- Shot: Left
- Played for: Washington Capitals; New York Rangers; St. Louis Blues; Boston Bruins; HC Bolzano
- NHL draft: 100th overall, 1996; Boston Bruins
- Playing career: 1998–2014
- Coaching career: 2014–present

Trenton Grant Whitfield (born June 17, 1977) is a Canadian former ice hockey coach and former centre who is the head coach of the Providence Bruins of the American Hockey League (AHL).

== Playing career ==
Whitfield was drafted in the fourth round, 100th overall, by the Boston Bruins in the 1996 NHL entry draft. He refused to sign with Boston, and returned to Spokane until signing a minor league contract with Washington.

On August 2, 2005, Whitfield signed with the St. Louis Blues for the 2005–06 season. After playing in 30 games with the Blues, Whitfield was assigned to their AHL affiliate, the Peoria Rivermen. Whitfield spent the next three seasons with the Rivermen, relied upon as captain and establishing himself as an elite player in the AHL.

He was recalled by the Blues, playing against the Colorado Avalanche, at St. Louis on January 15, 2009, in his first NHL game since 2006.

On July 13, 2009, Whitfield signed a two-year contract with the Boston Bruins, returning to the team by which he was drafted. Added as depth to the Bruins forwards, the veteran was assigned to captain Boston's AHL affiliate, the Providence Bruins, to begin the 2009–10. On October 21, 2009, Whitfield was recalled and made his debut with Boston against the Nashville Predators. He totalled 16 games over the course of the season with the Bruins and scored 43 points in 52 games with the P-Bruins before making his playoff debut with Boston in four games against the Philadelphia Flyers.

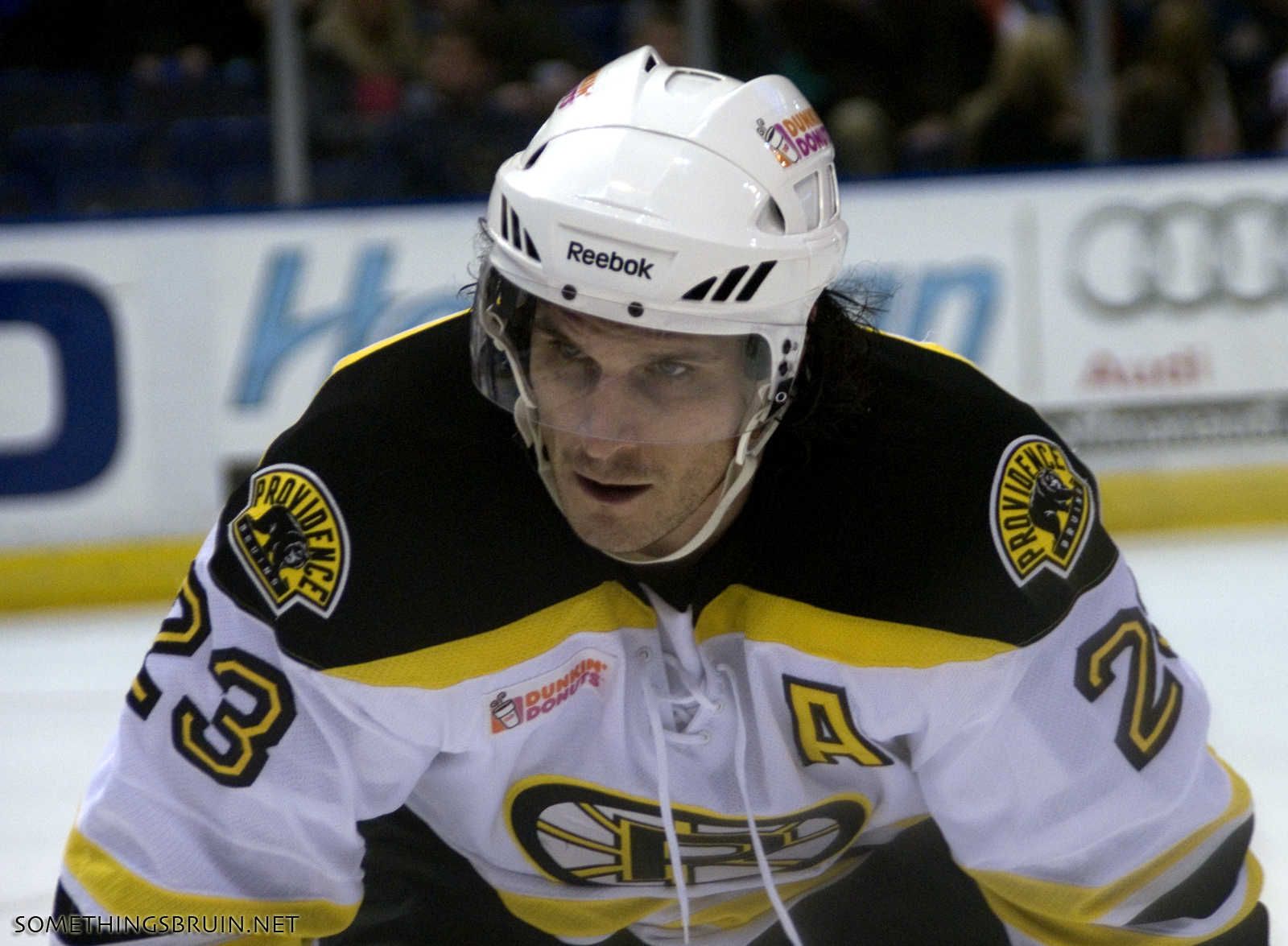
Whitfield in 2011

Prior to his second year with the Bruins on August 22, 2010, it was announced that Whitfield had torn his Achilles tendon and would likely miss the entirety of the 2010–11 season. Whitfield recovered from his injuries and played 45 games in the minors for Providence. He was called as a spare for Boston in March 2011. When Boston won the Stanley Cup in June 2011, Whitefield was included on the official team picture, and later awarded a Stanley Cup ring. However, since he only played in the minors, his name could not be included on the Stanley Cup. On July 1, 2011, Whitfield re-signed to a two-year contract with the Boston Bruins.

On August 22, 2013, after 15 seasons of professional hockey in North America, Whitfield signed his first European contract on a one-year deal with Italian club, HC Bolzano in their inaugural season in the Austrian Hockey League. He played one season with Bolzano, before retiring from his playing career.

== Coaching career ==
After retiring, Whitfield was named an assistant coach of the Portland Pirates, who were the American Hockey League (AHL) affiliate of the Arizona Coyotes at the time. After a year with the Pirates, he moved into the same role with the Calgary Hitmen of the Western Hockey League (WHL).

Whitfield would move back to the AHL after the 2014-15 season, accepting a position with the Providence Bruins as an assistant coach. On July 27, 2026, after ten years with the organization, Whitfield was named the 14th head coach in franchise history, replacing Ryan Mougenel.

== Career statistics ==
=== Regular season and playoffs ===
| | | | Regular season | | | | | Playoffs |
| Season | Team | League | GP | G | A | Pts | PIM | GP | G | A | Pts | PIM |
|---|---|---|---|---|---|---|---|---|---|---|---|---|
| 1993–94 | Spokane Chiefs | WHL | 5 | 1 | 1 | 2 | 0 | — | — | — | — | — |
| 1994–95 | Spokane Chiefs | WHL | 48 | 8 | 17 | 25 | 26 | 11 | 7 | 6 | 13 | 5 |
| 1995–96 | Spokane Chiefs | WHL | 72 | 33 | 51 | 84 | 75 | 18 | 8 | 10 | 18 | 10 |
| 1996–97 | Spokane Chiefs | WHL | 58 | 34 | 42 | 76 | 74 | 9 | 5 | 7 | 12 | 10 |
| 1997–98 | Spokane Chiefs | WHL | 65 | 38 | 44 | 82 | 97 | 18 | 9 | 10 | 19 | 15 |
| 1998–99 | Portland Pirates | AHL | 50 | 10 | 8 | 18 | 20 | — | — | — | — | — |
| 1998–99 | Hampton Roads Admirals | ECHL | 19 | 13 | 12 | 25 | 12 | 4 | 2 | 0 | 2 | 14 |
| 1999–00 | Portland Pirates | AHL | 79 | 18 | 35 | 53 | 52 | 3 | 1 | 1 | 2 | 2 |
| 1999–00 | Washington Capitals | NHL | — | — | — | — | — | 3 | 0 | 0 | 0 | 0 |
| 2000–01 | Portland Pirates | AHL | 19 | 9 | 11 | 20 | 27 | — | — | — | — | — |
| 2000–01 | Washington Capitals | NHL | 61 | 2 | 4 | 6 | 35 | 5 | 0 | 0 | 0 | 2 |
| 2001–02 | Washington Capitals | NHL | 24 | 0 | 1 | 1 | 28 | — | — | — | — | — |
| 2001–02 | New York Rangers | NHL | 1 | 0 | 0 | 0 | 0 | — | — | — | — | — |
| 2001–02 | Portland Pirates | AHL | 45 | 14 | 20 | 34 | 24 | — | — | — | — | — |
| 2002–03 | Portland Pirates | AHL | 64 | 27 | 34 | 61 | 42 | — | — | — | — | — |
| 2002–03 | Washington Capitals | NHL | 14 | 1 | 1 | 2 | 6 | 6 | 0 | 0 | 0 | 10 |
| 2003–04 | Portland Pirates | AHL | 24 | 8 | 7 | 15 | 22 | — | — | — | — | — |
| 2003–04 | Washington Capitals | NHL | 44 | 6 | 5 | 11 | 14 | — | — | — | — | — |
| 2004–05 | Portland Pirates | AHL | 67 | 16 | 38 | 54 | 75 | — | — | — | — | — |
| 2005–06 | St. Louis Blues | NHL | 30 | 2 | 5 | 7 | 14 | — | — | — | — | — |
| 2005–06 | Peoria Rivermen | AHL | 41 | 19 | 34 | 53 | 18 | — | — | — | — | — |
| 2006–07 | Peoria Rivermen | AHL | 79 | 33 | 45 | 78 | 70 | — | — | — | — | — |
| 2007–08 | Peoria Rivermen | AHL | 80 | 22 | 30 | 52 | 51 | — | — | — | — | — |
| 2008–09 | Peoria Rivermen | AHL | 69 | 20 | 30 | 50 | 37 | 7 | 2 | 1 | 3 | 0 |
| 2008–09 | St. Louis Blues | NHL | 3 | 0 | 1 | 1 | 0 | — | — | — | — | — |
| 2009–10 | Providence Bruins | AHL | 52 | 17 | 26 | 43 | 22 | — | — | — | — | — |
| 2009–10 | Boston Bruins | NHL | 16 | 0 | 1 | 1 | 7 | 4 | 0 | 0 | 0 | 0 |
| 2010–11 | Providence Bruins | AHL | 45 | 18 | 18 | 36 | 42 | — | — | — | — | — |
| 2011–12 | Providence Bruins | AHL | 50 | 9 | 7 | 16 | 32 | — | — | — | — | — |
| 2011–12 | Boston Bruins | NHL | 1 | 0 | 0 | 0 | 0 | — | — | — | — | — |
| 2012–13 | Providence Bruins | AHL | 48 | 6 | 6 | 12 | 20 | 11 | 0 | 2 | 2 | 14 |
| 2013–14 | HC Bolzano | EBEL | 54 | 14 | 18 | 32 | 14 | 13 | 2 | 5 | 7 | 4 |
| AHL totals | | | 812 | 247 | 349 | 596 | 554 | 21 | 3 | 4 | 7 | 16 |
| NHL totals | | | 194 | 11 | 18 | 29 | 104 | 18 | 0 | 0 | 0 | 12 |

Medal record

Representing Canada

Ice hockey

World Junior Championships
| Gold medal – first place | 1997 Switzerland | |

=== International ===
| Year | Team | Event | Result | GP | G | A | Pts | PIM |
|---|---|---|---|---|---|---|---|---|
| 1997 | Canada | WJC | 1st place, gold medalist(s) | 7 | 1 | 0 | 1 | 4 |
| Junior totals | | | | 7 | 1 | 0 | 1 | 4 |

== Awards and honours ==
| Award | Year |
|---|---|
WHL
| West First All-Star Team | 1997 |
| West Second All-Star Team | 1998 |
AHL
| All-Star Game | 2003, 2013 |
