= Ryan Mougenel =

Canadian ice hockey player and coach

- Born: March 2, 1976 (age 50) Scarborough, Ontario, Canada
- Height: 6 ft 1 in (185 cm)
- Weight: 195 lb (88 kg; 13 st 13 lb)
- Position: Right wing
- Shot: Left
- Played for: AHL; Rochester Americans; IHL; Quebec Rafales; Cleveland Lumberjacks; ECHL; Hampton Roads Admirals; Chesapeake Icebreakers; Jackson Bandits; Atlantic City Boardwalk Bullies
- Playing career: 1997–2003
- Coaching career: 2005–present

Ryan Mougenel (born March 2, 1976) is a Canadian ice hockey coach and former player who is currently an assistant coach of the Vancouver Canucks of the National Hockey League (NHL).

Mougenel played six seasons of professional ice hockey, including winning the 2003 Kelly Cup as a member of the Atlantic City Boardwalk Bullies. Mougenel is also a member of a business trio with NHLers Keith and Wayne Primeau, operating the Durham Hockey Institute in Toronto and owning the Whitby Fury of the Central Canadian Hockey League.

== Playing career ==
=== Junior career ===
Mougenel began his junior career in 1993 with the Owen Sound Platers. Mougenel would appear in 53 games and score 3 goals and 8 assists in his rookie season. The following season, Mougenel increased his output, scoring 11 goals and 18 assists in 66 games. In the 1995–96 season, Owen Sound would trade Mougenel to the Kitchener Rangers three games into the season.

Mougenel saw an explosion in production with Kitchener, scoring 30 goals and 24 assists in 60 games in the regular season and added eight goals and five assists in 12 playoff games in his first season with the team. In his final juniors season, Mougenel recorded 38 goals and 33 assists in 61 games for Kitchener during the regular season and scored five goals and four assists in 13 playoff games, as Kitchener reached the J. Ross Robertson Cup semifinals.

=== Professional career ===
In his first professional career, Mougenel bounced between four teams and two leagues, appearing for the Hampton Roads Admirals (4 points in 7 games) and Chesapeake Icebreakers (6 points in 7 games) of the East Coast Hockey League and the Quebec Rafales (5 points in 13 games) and the Cleveland Lumberjacks (8 points in 37 games) of the International Hockey League.

Mougenel would return with Cleveland during the 1997–98 season, scoring five goals and seven assists in 45 games with the Lumberjacks before making a return to Chesapeake of the ECHL. Mougenel would appear in Chesapeake's final eight regular season games, scoring two goals and three assists, and would play in two playoff games scoring one goal.

Mougenel would spend the 1999–00 season with the Rochester Americans of the American Hockey League, appearing in 20 games and scoring one goal with the team. Mougenel would spend the next two seasons with the Jackson Bandits of the ECHL, appearing in 105 games and scoring 26 goals and 29 assists during his tenure in Jackson. Mougenel's final season of professional hockey came with the Atlantic City Boardwalk Bullies. Mougenel would score 15 goals and 20 assists in 53 regular season games and scored one goal and eight assists for Atlantic City, as they won the Kelly Cup in five games over the Columbia Inferno.

=== International career ===
Mougenel was a member of the Canadian national men's ice hockey team from 1999–2000. Mougenel would appear in 27 games with Team Canada, scoring 2 goals and 11 assists.

== Coaching career ==
=== Early coaching positions ===
Mougenel joined Matt Thomas' staff on the Fresno Falcons in 2005 as an assistant. Mougenel would serves as Thomas' assistant with Fresno until the team folded midway through the 2008–09 season and rejoined Thomas as an assistant when Thomas was named the mid-season replacement for Chris Cichocki, who had been fired by the Stockton Thunder midway through the 2008–09 season.

=== Las Vegas Wranglers ===
In June 2009 the Las Vegas Wranglers announced that they had hired former Mougenel to be the second head coach and general manager in team history after the previous head coach, Glen Gulutzan left to become the head coach of the AHL's Texas Stars. Mougenel was officially introduced at Orleans Arena on June 30.

Mougenel early decisions as head coach and general manager were to bring in former NHL All-Star Keith Primeau to take over as the team's director of player development as well as being a special assistant to the general manager. and sever the team's ties with the Calgary Flames, who had been Las Vegas' NHL affiliate since the team's inaugural season in 2003. Mougenel stated that cost of travel between Las Vegas and Abbotsford, British Columbia (site of Calgary's newly relocated AHL affiliate) and immigration issues from Canada played large roles in the decision to separate. Mougenel announced that he signed an agreement to become the ECHL affiliate of the Phoenix Coyotes and Phoenix's AHL affiliate, the San Antonio Rampage.

During the 2010–11 season, Mougenel was named the head coach of the ECHL All-Stars for the 2011 ECHL All-Star Game.

=== Hershey Bears ===
Mougenel became assistant head coach for the Hershey Bears, AHL affiliate of the Washington Capitals on July 5, 2013 and filled as head coach in for one game on January 26, 2014, while the head coach was ill.

=== Worcester Sharks ===
On July 29, 2014, Mougenel left the Bears to become assistant head coach for the Worcester Sharks, AHL affiliate of the San Jose Sharks The Sharks later relocated their AHL franchise to San Jose starting in the 2015-16 season.

=== Providence Bruins ===
Mougenel joined the Providence Bruins, AHL affiliate of the Boston Bruins first as assistant head coach, then was promoted to head coach starting in the 2021-22 season

During the 2025-26 season, Mougenel was named the head coach of the AHL Atlantic All-Stars for the 2026 AHL All-Star Game for guiding the club to the best record in the Eastern Conference as of the pre-determined deadline, the end of play on January 11 (49 points, .790). Mougenel was later voted recipient of the Louis A.R. Pieri Memorial Award as the AHL’s outstanding coach for the 2025-26 season Mougenel guided Providence to a record of 54-16-2-0, good for 110 points and the fourth-highest points percentage (.764) in AHL history, while capturing the Macgregor Kilpatrick Trophy as the AHL’s regular-season champions.

Mougenel finished his tenure with the Bruins with two division championships, as well as making the playoffs each season he was at the helm, earning a first-round bye in three of his five seasons. However, the Bruins would only win one playoff series during his tenure, never making it past the second-round.

=== Vancouver Canucks ===
On July 10, 2026, Mougenel was named assistant coach of the Vancouver Canucks as part of Manny Malhotra's staff.

== Personal ==
On July 12, 2012, Mougenel jumped into the Boston Harbor to rescue a man who was drowning in the harbor and helped bring the man to dry land. The unknown victim was rushed to Massachusetts General Hospital.

== Head coaching record ==
=== ECHL ===
Team	Year	Regular season						Postseason			
Team	Year	G	W	L	T	Pts	Finish	W	L	Win %	Result
Las Vegas Wranglers	2009–10	72	34	30	8	76	2nd in Pacific	2	3	.400	Lost in Conference Quarterfinals
Las Vegas Wranglers	2010–11	72	38	29	5	81	3rd in Pacific	2	3	.400	Lost in Conference Quarterfinals
Las Vegas Wranglers	2011-12	72	42	22	8	92	2nd in Pacific	12	6	.667	Lost in Kelly Cup Finals
Las Vegas Wranglers	2012-13	72	37	30	0	79	3rd in Pacific	3	4	.428	Lost in Conference Quarterfinals
Total		288	151	111	21			7	10	.474	

=== AHL ===
Team	Year	Regular season							Postseason			
Team	Year	G	W	L	OTL	SOL	Pts	Finish	W	L	Win %	Result
Providence Bruins	2021–22	72	36	25	5	6	83	3rd in Atlantic	0	2	.500	Lost in Round 1
Providence Bruins	2022–23	72	44	18	8	2	98	1st in Atlantic	1	3	.250	Lost in Round 2
Providence Bruins	2023–24	72	42	21	6	3	93	2nd in Atlantic	1	3	.370	Lost in Round 2
Providence Bruins	2024–25	72	41	23	5	3	90	3rd in Atlantic	4	4	.625	Lost in Round 2
Providence Bruins	2025–26	72	54	16	2	0	110	1st in Atlantic	1	3	.250	Lost in Round 2
