= Todd Watson =

Canadian ice hockey coach

- Born: June 18, 1967 (age 59) Wyandotte, Michigan, USA
- Height: 178 cm (5 ft 10 in)
- Weight: 79 kg (174 lb; 12 st 6 lb)
- Position: Forward
- Played for: University of Michigan–Dearborn
- Coached for: Compuware Ambassadors (1999-00; asst); Compuware Ambassadors (2000-03; head); Plymouth Whalers (2003-06; asst); Saginaw Spirit (2007-12; head); Odessa Jackalopes (2019-20; head)

Todd Watson (born June 18, 1967 in Wyandotte, Michigan) is an American ice hockey coach who has held head coaching positions in both the North American Hockey League (NAHL) and the Ontario Hockey League (OHL).

== Biography ==
From 2000 to 2003, Watson served as head coach of the Detroit Compuware Ambassadors, a NAHL team based at the Compuware Sports Arena in Plymouth, Michigan. He earned NAHL Coach of the Year honors in 2002 and was named Executive of the Year in 2003. Under his leadership, the team posted a 115–37–16 record and captured the USA Hockey Junior A National Championship in 2002. In 2003, he joined the OHL's Plymouth Whalers as an assistant coach, where he played a key role in the team's J. Ross Robertson Cup victory and Memorial Cup appearance in the 2006–07 season.

In 2007, he took over as head coach of the Saginaw Spirit in the OHL. During the 2009 playoffs, Watson guided the team to its first-ever playoff series win by sweeping the Guelph Storm in the conference quarterfinals. He was dismissed early in the 2011–12 season and succeeded by Greg Gilbert. Following his coaching stint with the Spirit, he went on to work as a scout for the NHL's Dallas Stars.

In 2019, Watson was named head coach of the Odessa Jackalopes, a team in the NAHL. Although he began the season behind the bench, he stepped down from his coaching duties before the season concluded. Despite his departure from the head coaching role, Watson stayed connected to the organization by continuing to contribute as a regional scout.

== Coaching record ==
Team	Year	Regular season							Postseason
Team	Year	G	W	L	T	OTL	Pts	Finish	Result
SAG	2007–08	68	33	25	—	10	76	4th in West	Lost in first round
SAG	2008–09	68	36	24	—	8	80	2nd in West	Lost in second round
SAG	2009–10	68	34	27	—	7	75	2nd in West	Lost in first round
SAG	2010–11	68	40	22	—	6	86	1st in West	Lost in second round
SAG	2011–12	30	11	17	—	2	86	(fired)	

Preceded by Bob Mancini	Head coaches of the Saginaw Spirit; 2007–2011	Succeeded by Greg Gilbert
