= Dennis Desrosiers =

Canadian ice hockey player and coach

- Born: March 28, 1949 (age 77) Kirkland Lake, Ontario, Canada
- Height: 5 ft 11 in (180 cm)
- Weight: 195 lb (88 kg; 13 st 13 lb)
- Position: Right wing
- Shot: Right
- Played for: EHL; Clinton Comets; IHL; Saginaw Gears; Flint Generals; AHL; New Haven Nighthawks
- NHL draft: Undrafted
- Playing career: 1970–1983

Dennis Desrosiers (born March 28, 1949) is a Canadian former professional ice hockey player and coach. He played 13 professional seasons, mostly in the International Hockey League (IHL) where he played 532 games, scoring 312 goals and 277 points for 589 points, and earning 1690 penalty minutes. Following his retirement as a player, Desrosiers spent the next 18 seasons as a head coach in the IHL, ECHL, UHL and OHL. He was then Saginaw Spirit's radio colour commentator from 2004-2012.

== Playing career ==
Desrosiers began his professional career in 1970 with the Clinton Comets of the Eastern Hockey League where he played two seasons before joining the Saginaw Gears of the International Hockey League (IHL) for their inaugural 1972-73 season. With the exception of 28 games played in the American Hockey League with the New Haven Nighthawks during the 1973–74 season, Desrosiers remained with the Gears until the 1981–82 season when he joined the Flint Generals, first as a player and then, beginning with the 1983–84 season, as Flint's head coach.

== Coaching career ==
After two seasons as the head coach for the Flint Generals, Desrosiers was hired as the head coach for the Saginaw Generals starting with the 1985–86 season, leaving after two seasons to become the head coach for the Cincinnati Cyclones of the IHL. He continued as a head coach with the Birmingham Bulls (1996-2000) and the Kalamazoo Wings (2000-2002), before returning to Saginaw in 2002 to be named as the first head coach for the Saginaw Spirit of the Ontario Hockey League.

== Broadcasting career ==
In 2004, after two seasons as the Spirit's head coach, Desrosiers joined the Saginaw Spirit radio broadcast team as the colour commentator, a position he held until 2012 when he left the team to relocate to North Carolina. He returned in 2014 to the radio booth after a two-year absence.

== Awards and honours ==
In 2006, Desrosiers was inducted into the Saginaw County Sports Hall of Fame.

== Career statistics ==
			Regular season					Playoffs
Season	Team	League	GP	G	A	Pts	PIM	GP	G	A	Pts	PIM
1970–71	Clinton Comets	EHL-Sr.	74	26	29	55	201	5	2	2	4	2
1971–72	Clinton Comets	EHL-Sr.	75	41	35	76	267	5	4	2	6	2
1972–73	Saginaw Gears	IHL	70	60	37	97	186	—	—	—	—	—
1973–74	Saginaw Gears	IHL	39	18	17	35	43	13	5	6	11	52
1973–74	New Haven Nighthawks	AHL	28	4	12	16	38	—	—	—	—	—
1974–75	Saginaw Gears	IHL	67	44	36	80	225	19	23	15	38	52
1975–76	Saginaw Gears	IHL	69	40	41	81	254	12	3	8	11	58
1976–77	Saginaw Gears	IHL	75	46	50	96	255	19	12	11	23	67
1977–78	Saginaw Gears	IHL	78	51	44	95	288	5	0	2	2	14
1978–79	Saginaw Gears	IHL	36	14	13	27	170	—	—	—	—	—
1979–80	Saginaw Gears	IHL	12	2	8	10	53	7	3	2	5	33
1980–81	Saginaw Gears	IHL	2	0	0	0	5	—	—	—	—	—
1981–82	Saginaw Gears	IHL	2	0	1	1	0	—	—	—	—	—
1982–83	Flint Generals	IHL	18	11	10	21	41	4	3	3	6	4
1982–83	Flint Generals	IHL	64	26	20	46	170	2	1	0	1	20
IHL totals			532	312	277	589	1,690	81	50	47	97	300
