= Will Petschenig =

Canadian-Swiss ice hockey player

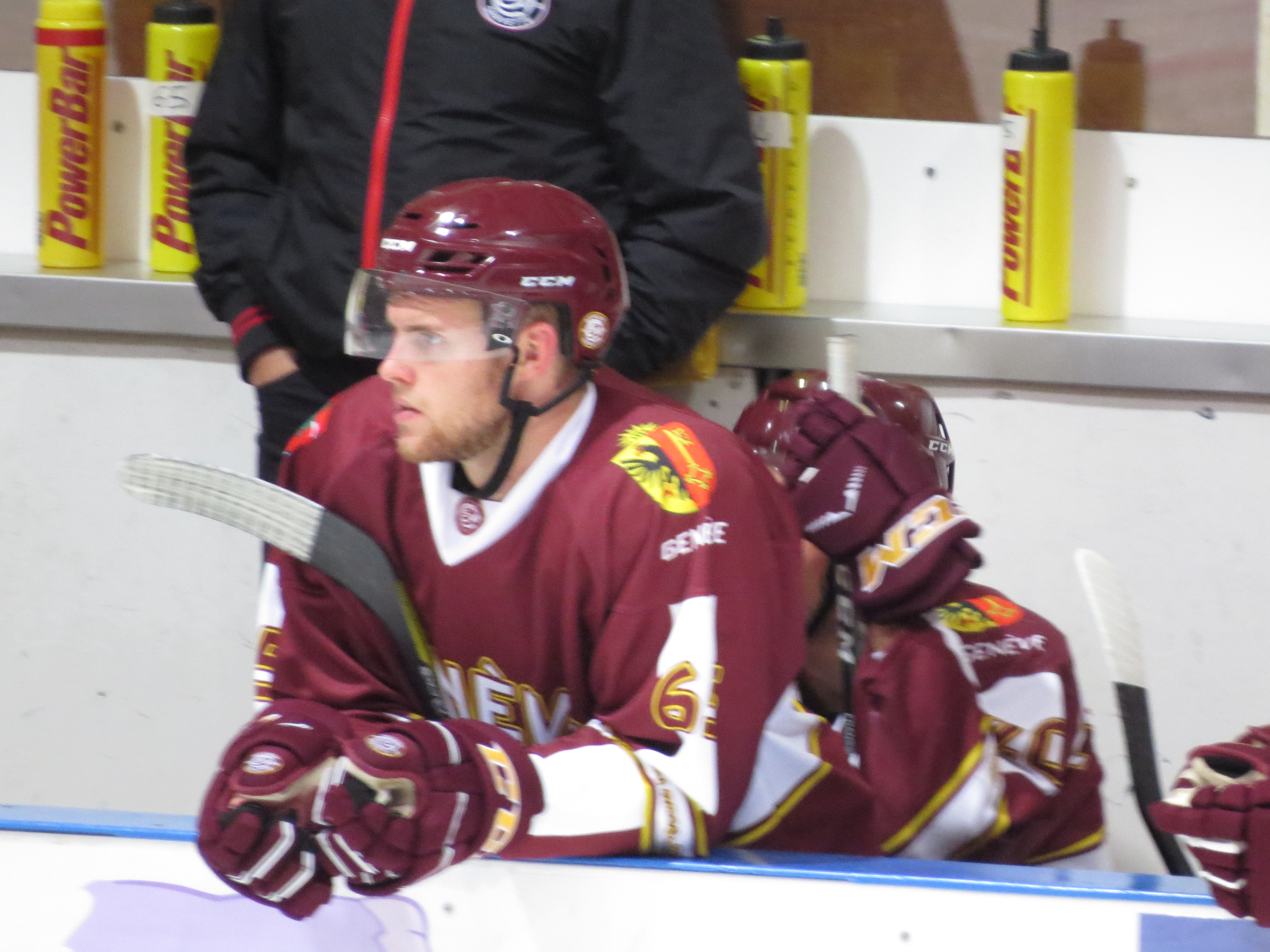
- Born: February 3, 1995 (age 30); Manotick, Ontario, Canada
- Height: 6 ft 3 in (191 cm)
- Weight: 205 lb (93 kg; 14 st 9 lb)
- Position: Defence
- Shot: Left
- Played for: Genève-Servette HC; EHC Biel; Fort Wayne Komets
- NHL draft: Undrafted
- Playing career: 2016–2020

William "Will" Petschenig (born February 3, 1995) is a Canadian–Swiss former professional ice hockey defenceman. Among the professional teams he played for are EHC Biel and Genève-Servette HC of the National League (NL) as well as HC La Chaux-de-Fonds of the Swiss League (SL).

== Playing career ==
Petschenig was born in Manotick, Ontario. After representing the Upper Canada Cyclones and after a short stint with the Nepean Raiders, Petschenig joined the Cornwall Colts of the Central Canada Hockey League for the 2011-12 season. From 2012 to 2015, he spent time with the Oshawa Generals of the Ontario Hockey League (OHL) and helped win the J. Ross Robertson Cup in 2015. A broken arm forced him to sit out, when his team captured the Memorial Cup the same year. Petschenig won several community service awards while playing for the Generals over his 3 seasons with the club. After the season, he was traded to the Saginaw Spirit, where he spent his final OHL season.

Petschenig signed his first professional contract on May 19, 2016, putting pen to paper on a two-year deal with Genève-Servette HC of the Swiss top-flight National League A (NLA).

In December 2017, Petschenig represented Team Canada at the Spengler Cup in Davos, Switzerland. Petschenig and Team Canada won gold, as this was the last tournament before the 2018 Winter Olympics.

On October 16, 2018, Petschenig was loaned to HC La Chaux-de-Fonds of the Swiss League. On December 7, 2018, Petschenig, was traded by Geneva to EHC Biel for Mauro Dufner. He appeared in 19 regular season games and 2 playoffs contests for Biel.

On August 26, 2019, Petschenig signed his first professional contract in North America, agreeing to a deal with the Fort Wayne Komets of the ECHL for the 2019–20 season. He registered 2 assists in 26 games before he was claimed off waivers by the Kalamazoo Wings on March 10, 2020, before the season was cancelled due to COVID-19. Petschenig retired in December 2020.

== Lacrosse ==
He became a coach in the Ontario Lacrosse Association. On October 11, 2022, he was named general manager and head coach of the Whitby Steelhawks of the Arena Lacrosse League.

== Personal ==
He received the All Weather Windows Humanitarian of the Year Award and the Dan Snyder Memorial Trophy for OHL Humanitarian of the Year in May 2016. Petschenig had created the programme "A Heart Like Mine" for kids who have lost a parent in memory of his father Dan, a former football player for the Toronto Argonauts who died in 2013.

== Career statistics ==
			Regular season					Playoffs
Season	Team	League	GP	G	A	Pts	PIM	GP	G	A	Pts	PIM
2011–12	Cornwall Colts	CCHL	53	5	11	16	64	15	1	0	1	8
2012–13	Oshawa Generals	OHL	52	3	14	17	25	1	0	2	2	4
2013–14	Oshawa Generals	OHL	68	3	22	25	84	12	0	3	3	12
2014–15	Oshawa Generals	OHL	45	5	21	26	43	18	2	7	9	22
2015–16	Saginaw Spirit	OHL	68	8	22	30	129	4	3	1	4	19
2016–17	Genève-Servette HC	NLA	50	3	7	10	28	4	0	0	0	12
2017–18	Genève-Servette HC	NL	48	5	5	10	34	5	0	1	1	4
2018–19	Genève-Servette HC	NL	7	1	4	5	12	—	—	—	—	—
2018–19	HC La Chaux-de-Fonds	SL	7	3	5	8	4	—	—	—	—	—
2018–19	EHC Biel	NL	19	2	10	12	18	2	0	0	0	0
2019–20	Fort Wayne Komets	ECHL	26	1	16	17	45	—	—	—	—	—
NL totals			125	11	26	37	72	19	0	1	1	26

== Awards and honours ==
Award	Year
OHL
Dan Snyder Memorial Trophy	2016
CHL Humanitarian of the Year	2016
