= Aaron Downey =

Canadian ice hockey player and coach

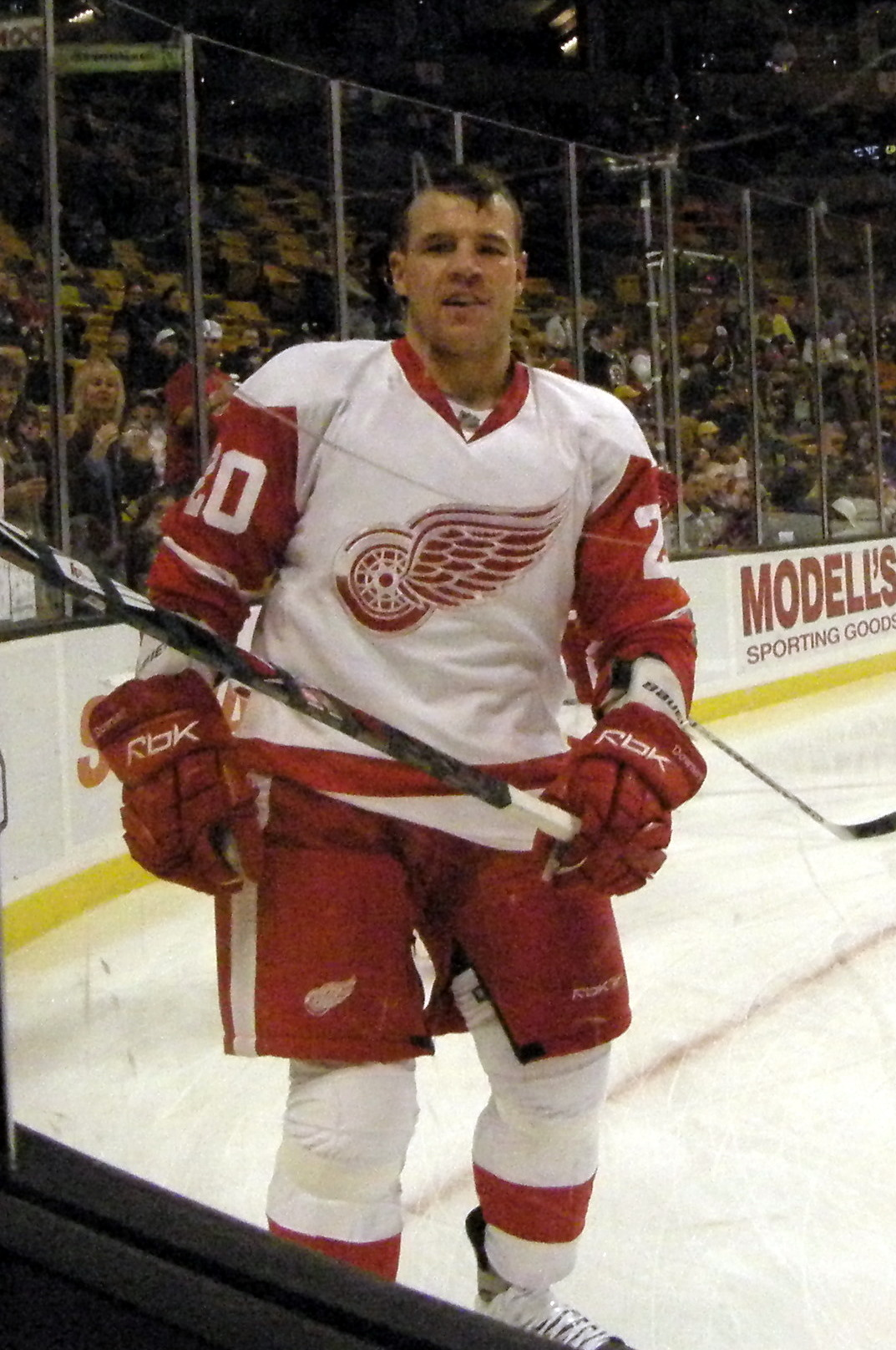
- Downey with the Detroit Red Wings in 2008
- Born: August 27, 1974 (age 51) Shelburne, Ontario, Canada
- Height: 6 ft 1 in (185 cm)
- Weight: 215 lb (98 kg; 15 st 5 lb)
- Position: Right wing
- Shot: Right
- Played for: St. Louis Blues; Dallas Stars; Chicago Blackhawks; Montreal Canadiens; Boston Bruins; Detroit Red Wings; Phoenix Coyotes
- NHL draft: Undrafted
- Playing career: 1996–2009

Aaron Douglas Downey (born August 27, 1974) is a Canadian professional ice hockey coach and former player. Downey played 13 seasons of professional ice hockey and played 243 games in the National Hockey League (NHL) for the Montreal Canadiens, Chicago Blackhawks, St. Louis Blues, Boston Bruins, Dallas Stars and Detroit Red Wings. He was not drafted by either an NHL team or a major junior team. Downey was mostly known for his role as an enforcer. Downey also played in the minor leagues for the Manitoba Moose, Portland Pirates, Providence Bruins, Norfolk Admirals, Hampton Roads Admirals and the Grand Rapids Griffins.

== Playing career ==
Downey grew up in Honeywood, Ontario playing his minor hockey for the Honeywood Minor Hockey Association. In 1990-91, Downey suited up for the Grand Valley Harvesters Jr. C. team. He also competed at the OFSSAA boys wrestling championships while in high school. In 1991-92, Downey moved up to the Collingwood Blues of the Ontario Provincial Jr.A. league.

In 1992-93, Downey walked on with the Guelph Storm of the Ontario Hockey League as a free agent. He was cut at the start of the 1993-94 season and waived through the OHL. He ended up playing two seasons with the Tier II Jr.A. Halifax Lions before signing as a free agent with the ECHL Hampton Roads Admirals.

Downey is mostly known for his role as an enforcer, though he instantly shot into notoriety after knocking the Carolina Hurricanes' Jesse Boulerice down with one punch on February 11, 2003; the incident left Boulerice with a mild concussion and a broken jaw. After the fight, Stars color commentator Daryl Reaugh coined the short-lived nickname "Aaron 'One punch and he's' Downey." On the flip side, Downey became a YouTube sensation after his April 16, 2006, non-fight with Ottawa Senator Brad Norton. The two squared off with fists raised for forty seconds before being escorted to the penalty box without having made contact or even thrown a punch.

Downey was invited to the 2007 Red Wings training camp on a tryout basis. He was offered a two-way contract at the end of camp and chose to sign. Downey began the 2007–08 NHL season as a member of the Red Wings, his fourth Original Six team. He was called up to the Detroit Red Wings lineup in mid October and had his first major league tilt as a Red Wing in a game against the San Jose Sharks, with Kyle McLaren, after McLaren took a run at Henrik Zetterberg and Dallas Drake. Less than a week later the Wings played the Sharks again and Downey had a heavyweight battle against then San Jose tough guy Rob Davison.

Downey added an element of toughness to the Red Wings with his willingness to fight. Prior to him joining the Red Wings, the Red Wings had been last in the NHL in fighting majors. The team had six for the 2005–06 NHL season, and 10 during the 2006–07 NHL season. Through February 2008, Downey accounted for nine of the team's 19 fights. He was often praised by head coach Mike Babcock for his willingness to stick up for teammates and his positive attitude in the dressing room. Perhaps his most memorable bout was against Colorado Avalanche player Ian Laperrière, who had hit and injured Red Wings superstar defenceman Nicklas Lidstrom earlier in the game. The two fought late in the first period and came together again early in the third.

In 2007–08 season he won the Stanley Cup with the Detroit Red Wings. Although he did not appear in a playoff game, he did play the required 41 regular-season games to get his name engraved on the cup.

Downey spent the majority of the 2008-2009 season playing for Detroit's minor league affiliate, the Grand Rapids Griffins. Downey played 65 games for the Griffins during the 2008-2009 season, scoring 2 goals, getting 7 assists and racking up 126 penalty minutes, with 9 fights. Downey also played four games for the Red Wings in 2008-2009, in those games he had 1 goal, 1 assist, an even plus/minus, 7 penalty minutes, and one fight and led the team in shooting percentage with an even 50.0%. Downey's one fight with the Red Wings during this season was against the St. Louis Blues Cam Janssen; it lasted well over a minute and was regarded by many hockey fans as one of the best fights all season. Downey played for the Griffins during the playoffs, getting 1 assist, 44 penalty minutes and 1 fight in 10 games, before the Griffins were eliminated by the Manitoba Moose. Downey was then called up to the Red Wings roster for the remainder of their playoff run, but he was a healthy scratch the entire time, not playing a single game. On August 21, 2009, Downey signed with the Phoenix Coyotes. On September 20, 2009, Downey was released from his professional tryout contract with the Coyotes.

== Post-playing career ==
In October 2010, Downey returned to the Red Wings as a part-time strength and conditioning coach, benefitting greatly from his, as Mickey Redmond once stated, "absolutely huge, potato-bag carrying hands.

On January 24, 2012, Aaron was elected to the Hampton Roads/Norfolk Admirals Hall of Fame along with Chris Phelps.

== Personal life ==
Aaron has one younger brother playing pro in Ontario, in a Senior League, Trevor who plays for their hometown team the Shelburne Muskies. Eldest brother Paul currently manages the family farm. Aaron is well known in the community for his various charitable contributions, mainly the House 9 Foundation for children as well as his fund-raising for leukemia research, a sickness that hit home when Kyle was diagnosed with but later beat a rare form of.

== Career statistics ==
=== Regular season and playoffs ===
			Regular season					Playoffs
Season	Team	League	GP	G	A	Pts	PIM	GP	G	A	Pts	PIM
1991–92	Collingwood Blues	CJBHL	41	5	11	16	109	—	—	—	—	—
1992–93	Guelph Storm	OHL	53	3	3	6	88	5	1	0	1	0
1995–96	Hampton Roads Admirals	ECHL	65	12	11	23	354	—	—	—	—	—
1996–97	Hampton Roads Admirals	ECHL	64	8	8	16	338	9	0	3	3	26
1996–97	Manitoba Moose	IHL	2	0	0	0	17	—	—	—	—	—
1996–97	Portland Pirates	AHL	3	0	0	0	19	—	—	—	—	—
1997–98	Providence Bruins	AHL	78	5	10	15	407	—	—	—	—	—
1998–99	Providence Bruins	AHL	75	10	12	22	401	19	1	1	2	46
1999–00	Providence Bruins	AHL	47	6	4	10	221	14	1	0	1	24
1999–00	Boston Bruins	NHL	1	0	0	0	0	—	—	—	—	—
2000–01	Norfolk Admirals	AHL	67	6	15	21	234	9	0	0	0	4
2000–01	Chicago Blackhawks	NHL	3	0	0	0	6	—	—	—	—	—
2001–02	Chicago Blackhawks	NHL	36	1	0	1	46	4	0	0	0	8
2001–02	Norfolk Admirals	AHL	12	0	2	2	21	—	—	—	—	—
2002–03	Dallas Stars	NHL	43	1	1	2	69	—	—	—	—	—
2003–04	Dallas Stars	NHL	37	1	1	2	77	—	—	—	—	—
2005–06	St. Louis Blues	NHL	17	2	0	2	45	—	—	—	—	—
2005-06	Montreal Canadiens	NHL	25	1	4	5	50	1	0	0	0	0
2006-07	Montreal Canadiens	NHL	21	1	0	1	48	—	—	—	—	—
2006–07	Providence Bruins	AHL	15	0	0	0	30	1	0	0	0	12
2007–08	Detroit Red Wings	NHL	56	0	3	3	116	—	—	—	—	—
2008–09	Grand Rapids Griffins	AHL	65	2	7	9	126	9	0	1	1	44
2008–09	Detroit Red Wings	NHL	4	1	1	2	7	—	—	—	—	—
AHL totals			362	29	50	79	1459	53	2	2	4	130
NHL totals			243	8	10	18	494	5	0	0	0	8
