= Cincinnati Cyclones =

American minor league ice hockey team in Ohio

- City: Cincinnati, Ohio
- League: ECHL
- Conference: Western
- Division: Central
- Founded: 1995 (current ECHL franchise); 1992 (IHL franchise); 1990 (first ECHL franchise)
- Home arena: Heritage Bank Center
- Colors: Red, black, gray, white
- Owner: Nederlander Entertainment
- General manager: Kristin Ropp
- Head coach: Riley Weselowski
- Media: Rudy Hodgson
- Affiliates: Toronto Maple Leafs (NHL); Toronto Marlies (AHL)
- Website: cycloneshockey.com

Franchise history
- First ECHL franchise
- 1990–1992: Cincinnati Cyclones
- 1992–2001: Birmingham Bulls
- 2001–2005: Atlantic City Boardwalk Bullies
- 2005–2015: Stockton Thunder
- 2015–present: Adirondack Thunder
- IHL franchise
- 1992–2001: Cincinnati Cyclones
- Current ECHL franchise
- 1995–1998: Louisville RiverFrogs
- 1998–1999: Miami Matadors
- 1999–2001: inactive
- 2001–present: Cincinnati Cyclones

Championships
- Regular season titles: 2 (2007–08, 2018–19)
- Division titles: 6 (1995–96, 2007–08, 2008–09, 2012–13, 2018–19, 2022–23)
- Conference titles: 3 (2007–08, 2009–10, 2013–14)
- Kelly Cups: 2 (2007–08, 2009–10)

The Cincinnati Cyclones are a professional minor league ice hockey team based in Cincinnati, Ohio. The team is a member of the ECHL. Originally established in 1990, the team first played their games in the Cincinnati Gardens and now play at Heritage Bank Center.

Cincinnati has fielded Cyclones teams with three separate franchises in two different leagues: the International Hockey League (1992–2001) and the ECHL (1990–1992, 2001–2004, 2006–present). Together, the franchises have combined to win two Kelly Cups (2008 and 2010), three conference championships (2008, 2010 and 2014), two overall points championships (2008 and 2019), and six division championships (1996, 2008, 2009, 2013, 2019 and 2023). In 2007–08, the team had the most successful season in ECHL history with 55 wins, 115 points, and its first conference and league championships.

== History ==
There have been three separate franchises known as the Cincinnati Cyclones, two in the ECHL and one in the IHL.

=== The early ECHL years: 1990–1992 ===
The first franchise to use the name Cincinnati Cyclones was founded in 1990. The team played their games at the Cincinnati Gardens. They lost in the first round of the playoffs in the 1990–91 season. In the 1991–92 season, the Cyclones lost in the Riley Cup semifinals. The team's owner at the time, Doug Kirchhofer, was granted an International Hockey League franchise and chose to move the Cyclones name to that franchise. He then sold the ECHL franchise to Art Clarkson of Birmingham, Alabama, to form the new Birmingham Bulls.

=== The IHL years: 1992–2001 ===
The first season in the IHL, Cincinnati failed to qualify for the postseason, which would be the first of only two seasons in which they did not qualify. Paul Lawless, who would eventually be head coach and vice president of player development and have his number retired, began his first of several stints with the team in the 1992–93 season. On April 2, 2004, during his number retirement ceremony, he was singled out as a reason for the team's success, both on the ice and in attendance. During the IHL years, the Cyclones set a team record of eight consecutive 90+ point seasons, ending when the International Hockey League ceased operations in 2001. During the Cyclones' nine years in the IHL, they won their only division and conference regular season championships in the 1995–96 season, but lost in a seven-game semifinal series to the Orlando Solar Bears. On February 4, 1995, during the Cyclones' 1994-95 season, head coach Don Jackson infamously punched the Atlanta Knights mascot, thus drawing a 10-game suspension and a $1,000 fine from the league.

In 1997, the Cyclones' lease agreement with the Cincinnati Gardens came to an end when the two sides were unable to reach an agreement for a new contract. Team owner, Doug Kirchhofer, purchased what then was known as Riverfront Coliseum in downtown Cincinnati, renamed it The Crown and renovated the arena. During the seven seasons the Cyclones were in the arena, the venue was renamed the Firstar Center and now is known as Heritage Bank Center. The team has since been unsuccessful in reclaiming the higher attendance numbers from the Cincinnati Gardens, until the 2008 Kelly Cup, where they drew 12,722 fans to the last game of the postseason.

=== Return to the ECHL: 2001–2004 ===
The third Cyclones franchise started in the 1995 as the Louisville RiverFrogs in Louisville, Kentucky. After three years, the team moved to Miami as the Miami Matadors. After the lone season in Florida, the franchise eventually came into the ownership of a group in Birmingham, Alabama, and the franchise went into inactive status while ownership looked into locations for their team. Upon the folding of the IHL, the Cyclones name was sold to this ownership group who moved the franchise to Cincinnati to become the new Cyclones.

The first year back in the ECHL ended the team's streak of 90+ point seasons with the Cyclones finishing just 12 points shy despite a 10-game fewer season length. Former Cyclones player Paul Lawless became head coach, as a mid-season replacement for Ray Edwards.

Before the start of the 2003–04 season former Cyclones player and assistant coach Chris Cichocki left the Arkansas RiverBlades in order to return as the Cyclones head coach. Despite his success with Arkansas, Cichocki led the team to their worst season with 54 points and failed to make the playoffs for the second time in team history.

Shortly after ending the season without a playoff berth, in April 2004, the Cyclones suspended operations. This suspension was mainly due to lack of revenue and safe access to the arena as it was limited by construction in Downtown Cincinnati. This dormancy left Cincinnati hockey to the cross-town, Cincinnati Gardens-based AHL rival, the Cincinnati Mighty Ducks. The Cincinnati Mighty Ducks suspended operations in 2005 after their NHL affiliate, the Mighty Ducks of Anaheim, switched their affiliation to the Portland Pirates.

=== Resumed play: 2006–present ===
With minor league hockey dormant in Cincinnati for a year, and plans for the proposed AHL Cincinnati RailRaiders franchise scrapped for 2006–07, on April 21, 2006, the Cyclones announced that they would participate in the upcoming 2006–07 ECHL season. They returned to play their home games at U.S. Bank Arena, joining their two ECHL, Ohio rivals, the Dayton Bombers and Toledo Storm. They then obtained an affiliation with the Montreal Canadiens of the NHL and the Hamilton Bulldogs of the AHL. The Cyclones won their first game back in the ECHL on October 20 against the Pensacola Ice Pilots at U.S. Bank Arena with a score of 3–1. Head coach Chuck Weber was the runner-up for the ECHL's Coach of the Year award for 2006–07 and was re-signed for the 2007–08 season.

In addition to the Montreal/Hamilton affiliation, the Cyclones added the NHL's Nashville Predators and the AHL's Milwaukee Admirals as affiliates in 2007. The Cyclones' 2007–08 season saw the club break numerous franchise and league records. Through 50 games, the Cyclones were 31 games over .500. Attendance at games had increased nearly 40% over 2006–07 and the club had already surpassed their win total from 2006 to 2007 (37). They achieved this mark in 24 fewer games. On February 22, 2008, the Cyclones tied the ECHL record for a single-season winning streak of 14 consecutive games, defeating the Johnstown Chiefs 5–2 in Cincinnati. On February 23, 2008, David Desharnais recorded two assists, extending his streak of games with at least one assist to 18, breaking the existing ECHL record of 17. In the same game, the Cyclones set a new ECHL record for a single-season winning streak of 15 consecutive wins when the Cyclones defeated the Elmira Jackals in a 5–4 shootout.

The team finished the regular season with 115 points, earning them the Brabham Cup regular season championship. Individually, Chuck Weber was named ECHL coach of the year, earning him the John Brophy trophy. David Desharnais claimed three ECHL awards: Most Valuable Player, Rookie of the Year, and the Leading Scorer award with 29 goals and 77 assists for 106 points. In addition, Chad Starling won the award for the highest plus/minus rating.

The Cyclones entered the playoffs and defeated the Johnstown Chiefs four games to none. The Cyclones moved on to take on the Reading Royals, Cincinnati took the series in seven games to claim their second ever North Division playoff title. The Cyclones then defeated the South Carolina Stingrays, 2–1 in overtime, to claim the American Conference Championship in five games. With their victory, Cincinnati also claimed the E.A. "Bud" Gingher Memorial Trophy.

The Cyclones then defeated the National Conference Champion Las Vegas Wranglers in the Kelly Cup Finals, clinching their first championship in team history in six games. After splitting the first two games in Cincinnati (Cincinnati 4–3 and Las Vegas 1–0), the series shifted to Las Vegas, where Cincinnati won games three and five to take a 3–2 series lead. In front of a record setting crowd, 12,722 fans, at US Bank Arena in Cincinnati on June 5, the Cyclones defeated Las Vegas in game six, 3–1, to take the championship and their 71st win of the season. Goalie Cedrick Desjardins was named the Kelly Cup Playoff MVP.

After the Cyclones cup win, coach Chuck Weber and assistant coach Dean Stork received multi-year extensions. Weber was also given the title of vice president. On November 29, Weber picked up his 100th professional head coaching victory with a 6–3 win at Johnstown.

Cincinnati's 2008–09 season was not as successful as the previous one, but they won 41 games for 87 points, repeating as North Division champions. They won a seven-game series against the Wheeling Nailers, including a double overtime game seven win, and swept the Elmira Jackals to win the North Division playoff title. However, the Cyclones would be swept by the South Carolina Stingrays in the American Conference Finals.

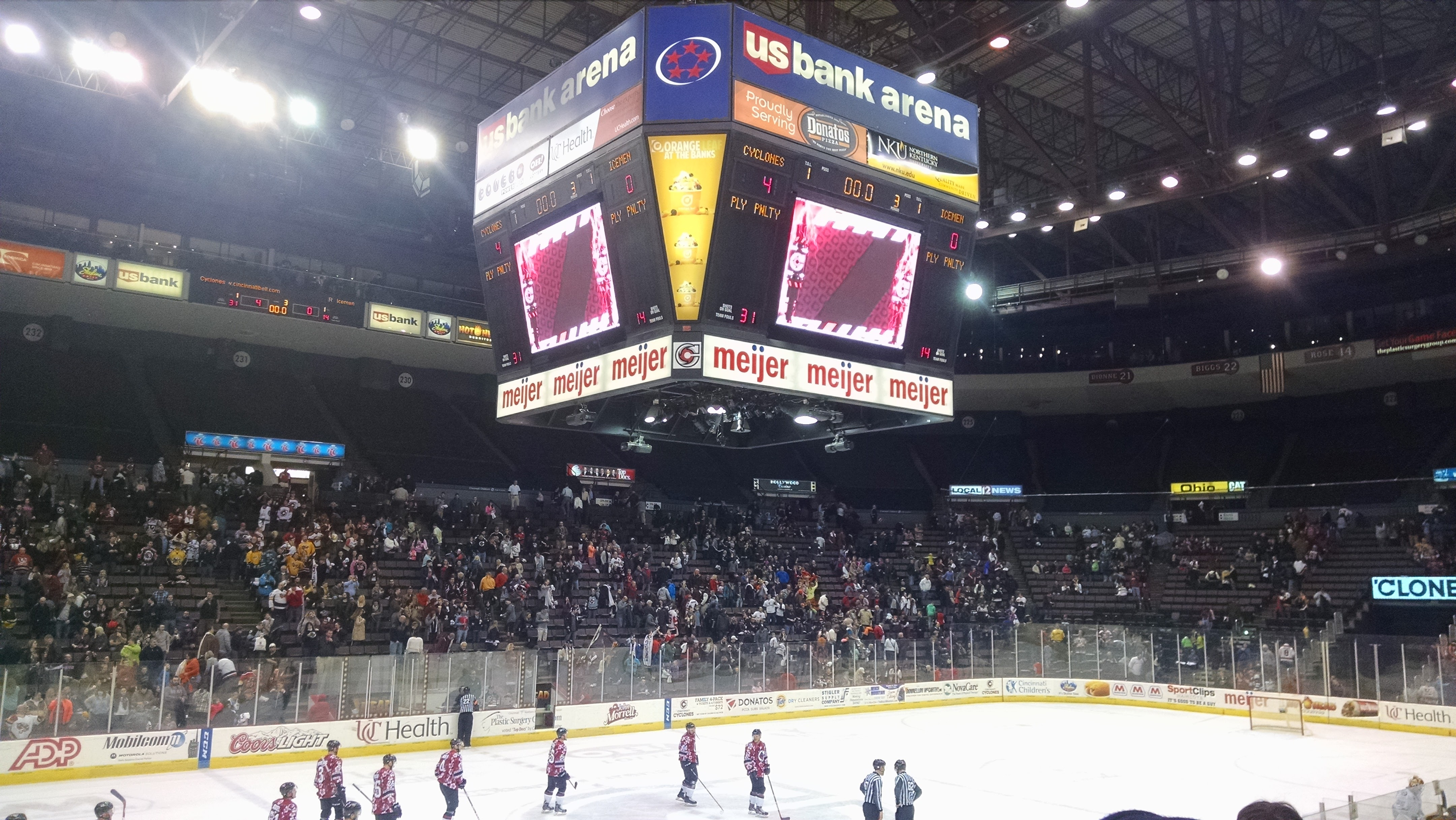
Cyclones game at US Bank Arena

The 2009–10 season proved to be more successful with 44 wins and 91 points, the wins total being the most in the American Conference. Despite that, the Cyclones finished second in the North Division to the Kalamazoo Wings and fifth in the conference. This led to a rematch with fourth seeded, and defending champion, South Carolina in the first round, where Cincinnati defeated the Stingrays in five games. Veteran captain Barrett Eghotz scored in overtime for the 3–2 win in game five and was the third straight overtime game in the series. The Cyclones then faced the top seeded Charlotte Checkers, defeating the Checkers in game seven with a 2–1 victory.

Cincinnati drew the Reading Royals in the American Conference Final. The seven-game series was marred by several incidents, both on and off the ice, that resulted in suspensions and fines to players and staff of both organizations. The worst occurred after game six, when Reading's Scott Fletcher allegedly struck a Cincinnati fan with a stick, drawing an indefinite suspension by the league. Nevertheless, the series made ECHL history when, after losing the first two at home, then game three at Reading, Cincinnati posted wins of 6–4, 5–0 and 6–3 to force the team's third winner-take-all game in the 2010 playoffs. In front of 5,340 fans, the Cyclones posted a 1–0 win to become the first team in ECHL history, and the sixth professional hockey team in history, to come back from a 3–0 deficit to win a best of seven series. The only goal of the contest was scored by Barret Ehgoetz 13:48 into the game.

The Cyclones defeated the Idaho Steelheads in the 2010 Kelly Cup Final, four-games-to-one. Cincinnati scored game-winning goals within the last minute in the first two games, a 3–2 win on a goal by Mark Van Guilder with 49.2 seconds remaining on May 14, and a 1–0 win the next night, when Mathieu Aubin netted the only goal in the contest and only with 20.1 seconds remaining in regulation. The series shifted to US Bank Arena and witnessed an Idaho victory within the first minute of the second overtime of game three, as Evan Barlow received a pass at the bottom of the right circle and fired the puck into a largely vacated goal, as Cyclones goalie Robert Mayer had committed to the left side.

In front of yet another ECHL playoff record setting crowd of 13,483 at US Bank Arena in Cincinnati, the Cyclones defeated Idaho in game five, 2–1, to take the championship. With the victory, the Cyclones clinched their second Kelly Cup title in three years. The game was also the Cyclones 24th Kelly Cup playoff game, surpassing the club record of 22 postseason games played by the 2008 championship team and is one more than South Carolina (23) had in its title run in 2009. Rookie Cyclones goaltenders Robert Mayer and Jeremy Smith were named co-winners of the Kelly Cup playoffs MVP. Cincinnati finished with a total record of 59–32–4.

The Cyclones underwent several changes before the 2010–11 season when assistant coach Dean Stork became the head coach of the Greenville Road Warriors in June and head coach Chuck Weber was promoted to the American Hockey League as head coach of the Rochester Americans on July 27. On August 4, Cincinnati signed a new affiliation agreement with the NHL's Florida Panthers, who used Rochester as their AHL farm team, creating a working relationship between Chuck Weber and his former Cyclones team. On August 12, Cincinnati named Jarrod Skalde as the new head coach. After undergoing this major coaching overhaul and losing a large portion of their roster, the Cyclones went on to post their third lowest points total in franchise history. They were still able to earn a seventh seed in the ECHL playoffs, but lost in the first round to Reading Royals, three-games-to-one.

In 2011, the Florida Panthers moved their AHL affiliation to the San Antonio Rampage as well their AHL head coach, Chuck Weber. Despite heavy support by new AHL affiliate, the 2011–12 season would still be unsuccessful. The Cyclones had a slow start to the season and while they stayed competitive throughout the rest of the season, they earned only 35 wins and 79 points. Cincinnati would finish tenth in the conference, marking only the third time in their 20-season history that they did not make the playoffs.

The Cyclones made a complete turnaround the next season, beginning the season unbeaten in regulation for the first nine games. Their 42 wins and 92 points won the North Division regular season championship, their third such accolade in six seasons, and placed them second in the Eastern Conference. The season earned head coach Jarrod Skalde Coach of the Year honors. Cincinnati would go on to win a pair of six-game wins against the Toledo Walleye and Gwinnett Gladiators before losing a five-game conference final to the top seeded Reading Royals, who would go on to win the Kelly Cup.

On July 9, 2013, coach Skalde accepted an assistant's position with the AHL's Norfolk Admirals, becoming the second consecutive Cyclones coach to be promoted to a higher level. Before the 2014–15 season, Skalde was appointed as Norfolk's head coach.

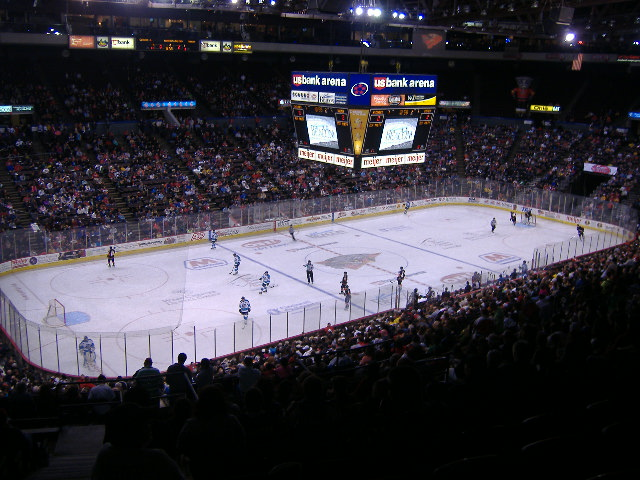
Cincinnati Cyclones vs. Evansville IceMen on March 30, 2013

Cincinnati came back strong under new head coach Ben Simon in 2013–14, with 41 wins and 91 points for a fifth-place finish in the Eastern Conference. Cincinnati would win three series against the Orlando Solar Bears, Fort Wayne Komets, and Greenville Road Warriors, all in six games, earning their third trip to the Kelly Cup Finals. They faced the Brabham Cup winning Alaska Aces, but would lose the series in six games. Despite the loss in the final, Cincinnati goaltender Rob Madore was named Most Valuable Player of the 2014 Kelly Cup playoffs, becoming the first player from the losing team to win the award in the ECHL's 26-year history, and the fourth Cincinnati goaltender to either win the trophy outright or share the trophy. Madore earned the award after leading the ECHL with all 14 of Cincinnati's playoff wins, 1,493 minutes of play, and a Cincinnati record 756 saves while playing every second of Cincinnati's 24 playoff games.

After the season, coach Simon accepted a role with the Toronto Marlies, the top affiliate of the Toronto Maple Leafs. Simon became the third consecutive Cyclones head coach to accept a role in the AHL. Following Simon's promotion, Matt Macdonald became Cincinnati's head coach. In the 2014–15 season, Cincinnati finished fifth in the North Division of the Eastern Conference with a record of 31–30–2–9. The team would miss the playoffs by only three points.

On February 27, 2016, the Cyclones played in front of their first-ever sellout at US Bank Arena with 16,529 fans were in attendance for Teenage Mutant Ninja Turtles Night and one dollar pizza slices. While the game was a 3–2 shootout loss to the Indy Fuel, the Cyclones set the record for the largest crowd for a professional hockey game in the 41-year history of US Bank Arena.

After ten seasons, the Nashville Predators and Milwaukee Admirals ended their affiliation with the Cyclones prior to the 2017–18 season. The Cyclones then found affiliations with the Buffalo Sabres and Rochester Americans. This is the second time Buffalo has affiliated with a Cincinnati hockey team, after the Sabres' affiliation with the Cincinnati Swords in the 1970s.

Prior to the 2018–19 season, head coach Matt Mcdonald was hired as an assistant with the Grand Rapids Griffins in the AHL. He was replaced by Matt Thomas, who then led the team to the regular season title and second Brabham Cup in franchise history and won the John Brophy Award for coach of the year. Despite the regular season success, the team lost in the division finals four games to one to the Toledo Walleye.

Due to the COVID-19 pandemic, the Cyclones voluntarily suspended operations for the 2020–21 ECHL season. Prior to the start of the 2021–22 season, head coach Thomas was hired by the AHL's Providence Bruins as an assistant coach and the Cyclones named Jason Payne as the next head coach.

== Uniform ==
After introducing their current mascot, Twister, in 1995, the Cyclones had always included him in their uniform design. In fact, from 1996 to 2014 he was the centerpiece of the jerseys they wore. However, prior to the 2014–15 season, the organization did a complete revamp of the uniforms and their colors. Twister was removed from the uniform completely along with the color yellow. The shade of red used was also changed from a darker maroon style red to a more bright royal red. The logo now is described as being a twister, or cyclone, in the center of a "C" standing for, Cincinnati. The jersey concepts also changed from being a classic hockey style to a more modern era look. The home, away, and alternate jerseys have red shoulders and red stripes that begin at the elbow area and wrap around to the underside of the wrists. The home jerseys are base white with red trim, the away jerseys are base black with red trim, and the alternates are sublimated black with a fully red crest. Other than the change in color, all three jerseys are similar.

== Season-by-season results ==
This is a partial list of the last thirteen seasons completed by the Cincinnati Cyclones. For the full season-by-season history, see List of Cincinnati Cyclones seasons

Season	League	Division	GP	W	L	OTL	SOL	Pts	PCT	GF	GA	PIM	Coach(es)	Result
2012–13	ECHL	North	72	42	22	5	3	92	.639	227	195	1119	Jarrod Skalde	Lost in round 3
2013–14	ECHL	North	72	41	23	4	4	90	.625	247	204	839	Ben Simon	Lost in round 4
2014–15	ECHL	North	72	31	30	2	9	73	.507	195	212	963	Matt Macdonald	Did not qualify
2015–16	ECHL	Midwest	72	36	27	5	4	81	.563	222	210	847	Matt Macdonald	Lost in round 1
2016–17	ECHL	South	72	36	29	6	1	79	.549	200	209	949	Matt Macdonald	Did not qualify
2017–18	ECHL	Central	72	39	30	3	0	81	.563	226	220	992	Matt Macdonald	Lost in round 1
2018–19	ECHL	Central	72	51	13	5	3	110	.764	282	176	1050	Matt Thomas	Lost in round 2
2019–20	ECHL	Central	63	38	17	7	1	84	.667	196	161	808	Matt Thomas	Playoffs cancelled
2020–21	ECHL	Opted out of participating due to the COVID-19 pandemic												
2021–22	ECHL	Central	72	36	32	3	1	76	.528	243	239	1110	Jason Payne	Lost in round 1
2022–23	ECHL	Central	72	47	16	6	3	103	.715	266	216	1262	Jason Payne	Lost in round 2
2023–24	ECHL	Central	72	31	34	7	0	69	.479	236	261	1013	Jason Payne	Did not qualify
2024–25	ECHL	Central	72	29	32	11	0	69	.479	184	207	811	Jason Payne	Did not qualify

== Players ==
=== Notable players ===
- 16 – Greg Stewart played the 2006–07 season with the Cyclones and was the first player under Chuck Weber to reach the NHL with Montreal in 2008.
- 20 – Kevin Kerr: All-time leader in scoring for non-NHL players. Kerr played three seasons and 112 games with Cincinnati, tallying 145 points in regular season play and 19 points in 13 playoff games with the Cyclones.
- 21 – Gilbert Dionne: scored 134 goals in 313 games with the team, and won the 1999 IHL All Star Game MVP Award in a game played at US Bank Arena.
- 22 – Don Biggs: The centerpiece of the team for many years, Biggs played 458 games for Cincinnati, scoring 147 goals and tallying 444 points total. Both totals are records for any player from any version of the Cyclones.
- 30 – Cedrick Desjardins posted a 40–23–3 record from 2007 to 2009. He was also named the 2008 Kelly Cup Playoffs Most Valuable Player.
- 44 – J.T. Wyman Played a portion of the 08–09 season with Cincinnati. In 15 games with the organization, Wyman had 8 assists while on loan from Hamilton. He became the second player whom Chuck Weber coached to reach the NHL in 2009 with Montreal. Wyman played 43 games across three seasons in the NHL, scoring two goals and nine assists.
- 51 – David Desharnais Played the 07–08 season with the Cyclones and was the ECHL Most Valuable Player, ECHL Rookie of the Year with 106 points en route to winning the Kelly Cup, became the third Chuck Weber product to make the NHL with Montreal in 2009
- 55 – Byron Froese: Played for the Cyclones from 2013 to 2015. In 42 games over two seasons, he accounted for 19 goals, 26 assists, and 45 points. Froese was first recalled by the Toronto Maple Leafs on October 23, 2015, and debuted the following night. Froese also played for the Tampa Bay Lightning, Montreal Canadiens, and was traded to the Philadelphia Flyers organization during the 2018–19 season.
- Coach Ron Smith – Head coach of the Cyclones from 1995 to 2001. Tallied a franchise record 266 wins during his six years with the team.

=== Retired numbers ===
- 7* – Seventh Man (fans)
- 22 – Don Biggs
- 13 – Paul Lawless on April 2, 1999.
- 14* – Pete Rose. (At the time, because Rose was permanently banned from baseball, the Cincinnati Reds were expected to never retire his number, an assumption that was disproven in 2016 when the Reds did so anyway. The Cyclones thus retired the number instead.)
- 21 – Gilbert Dionne – Retired on December 2, 2006.

* – Denotes honorary number.

League Championships
Preceded by Las Vegas Wranglers	Brabham Cup Champions; 2007–08	Succeeded by Florida Everblades
Preceded by Idaho Steelheads	Kelly Cup Champions; 2007–08	Succeeded by South Carolina Stingrays
Preceded by South Carolina Stingrays	Kelly Cup Champions; 2009–10	Succeeded by Alaska Aces
Preceded by Florida Everblades	Brabham Cup Champions; 2018–19	Succeeded by Not Awarded (2019–20); Florida Everblades (2020–21)
