= Saginaw Spirit =

Ontario Hockey League team in Saginaw, Michigan

- City: Saginaw, Michigan
- League: Ontario Hockey League
- Conference: Western
- Division: West
- Founded: 2002–03
- Home arena: Dow Event Center
- Colors: Midnight blue, red, silver, white and yellow
- General manager: Dave Drinkill
- Head coach: Chris Lazary
- Website: saginawspirit.com

Franchise history
- 1943–1947: St. Catharines Falcons
- 1947–1962: St. Catharines Teepees
- 1962–1976: St. Catharines Black Hawks
- 1976–1982: Niagara Falls Flyers
- 1982–2002: North Bay Centennials
- 2002–present: Saginaw Spirit

Championships
- Playoff championships: Memorial Cup; 1 (2024)

Current uniform

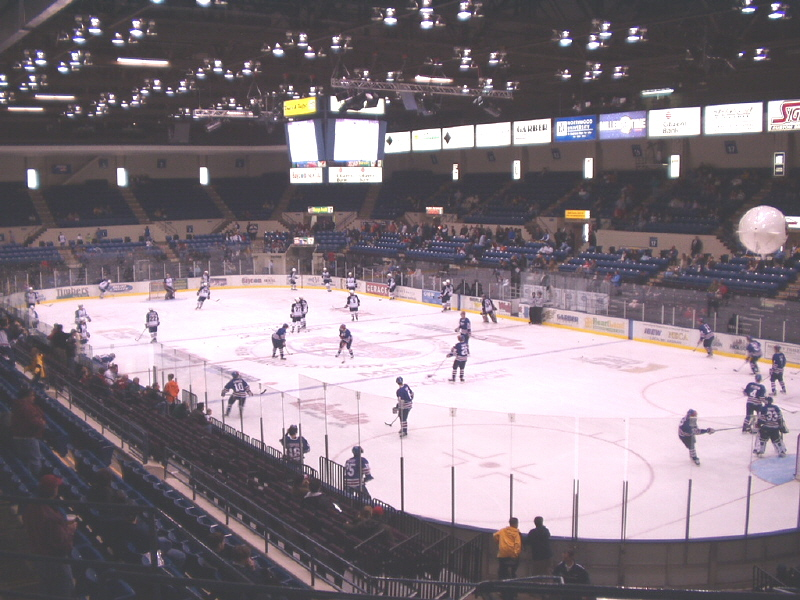
Pregame warm-up at Wendler Arena

The Saginaw Spirit are an American junior ice hockey team based in Saginaw, Michigan. They are members of the West Division of the Western Conference of the Ontario Hockey League (OHL), one of the Major Junior leagues of the Canadian Hockey League (CHL). In 2024, the team won the Memorial Cup, their first championship since the franchise moved to Saginaw in 2002, and became only the third American team to win the Memorial Cup.

== History ==
The Saginaw Spirit were born when Dick Garber, the owner of several local automobile dealerships, purchased the North Bay Centennials and moved the team to Saginaw after the 2001–02 season. Saginaw Spirit was named by an elementary school student attending Handley Elementary after a contest was held to name the new coming team.

The team traces its roots back to St. Catharines, Ontario, where it played as the Falcons, Teepees, and Black Hawks from 1943 to 1976. It won two Memorial Cup championships as the Teepees, in 1954 and 1960. In 1976, the franchise moved to nearby Niagara Falls, where it was known as the Flyers. In 1982, the team was moved again, this time to North Bay, and renamed the Centennials, where it remained until moving to Saginaw in 2002.

The Spirit have done extensive promotions in the Mid-Michigan area, increasing their fan base and season ticket-holder numbers. The Spirit have one of the highest attendance rates in the Ontario Hockey League.

After three rebuilding seasons, the Spirit clinched their first playoff berth on March 2, 2006, but lost in the first round to the Guelph Storm. Led by Todd Watson, they made the playoffs the following two seasons, but lost to the division rival Sault Ste. Marie Greyhounds both times, in six games in 2007 and in four games in 2008. In 2009, the Spirit won their first playoff series since relocating to Saginaw, sweeping Guelph in four games. They were then swept in the second round by the London Knights.

On December 29, 2013, the Spirit and the Windsor Spitfires played the first ever outdoor game in Ontario Hockey League history. The game was played at Comerica Park in Detroit, Michigan. The Spitfires won the game 6–5 in front of a shortly lived Canadian Hockey League record of 25,749 spectators, surpassed later that night by the London Knights and Plymouth Whalers at the same venue.

In March 2023, the CHL announced the Spirit as hosts of the 2024 Memorial Cup, granting them an automatic berth. This was the first time that the United States hosted a Memorial Cup since the Spokane Chiefs in 1998. The Spirit won the championship over the London Knights, becoming only the third American team to win the Memorial Cup.

== Coaches ==
The first coach in Saginaw Spirit history was Dennis Desrosiers. He was well known to local fans, with many years of hockey experience in Michigan. As a player, he spent 10 years for the Saginaw Gears (IHL), and spent time coaching the Flint Generals, Saginaw Generals & Kalamazoo Wings all in Michigan.

List of coaches. Numbers of seasons in parentheses.

- 2002–03 – Dennis Desrosiers (2)
- 2003–04 – Dennis Desrosiers / Moe Mantha
- 2004–05 – Doug Lidster / Bob Mancini
- 2005–07 – Bob Mancini (3)
- 2007–11 – Todd Watson (5)
- 2011-12 – Todd Watson / Greg Gilbert
- 2012–16 – Greg Gilbert fired mid-season
- 2016 – Moe Mantha (interim)
- 2016–17 – Spencer Carbery
- 2017–18 – Troy Smith
- 2018–present – Chris Lazary

== Players ==
=== Award winners ===
- 2003–04 – Patrick McNeill, Jack Ferguson Award - 1st overall OHL Priority Draft Selection
- 2005–06 – Ryan Daniels, F.W. "Dinty" Moore Trophy - Best Rookie GAA
- 2005–06 – Craig Goslin, OHL Executive of the Year
- 2006–07 – Tom Pyatt, William Hanley Trophy - Most Sportsmanlike Player of the Year
- 2006–07 – Craig Goslin, OHL Executive of the Year
- 2011–12 – Brandon Saad, William Hanley Trophy - Most Sportsmanlike Player of the Year
- 2011–12 – Greg Gilbert, Matt Leyden Trophy - Coach of the Year
- 2015–16 – Will Petschenig, Dan Snyder Memorial Trophy - Humanitarian of the Year
- 2019-20 - Cole Perfetti, CHL Scholastic Player of the Year
- 2024–25 – Michael Misa, CHL Top Scorer Award and Eddie Powers Memorial Trophy - Top scorer

=== Retired numbers ===
- 89 – Vincent Trocheck
- 22 – Brandon Saad

=== NHL alumni ===
- Cody Bass
- Paul Bissonnette
- Chris Breen
- T. J. Brodie
- Ben Chiarot
- Matt Corrente
- Damien Giroux
- Filip Hronek
- John McFarland
- Ryan McLeod
- Pavel Mintyukov
- Michael Misa
- Jan Mursak
- Ryan O'Marra
- Jamie Oleksiak
- Zayne Parekh
- Cole Perfetti
- Geoff Platt
- Dalton Prout
- Tom Pyatt
- Brandon Saad
- Michael Sgarbossa
- Ilya Solovyov
- Mitchell Stephens
- Jordan Szwarz
- Chris Thorburn
- Owen Tippett
- Vincent Trocheck

== Season-by-season results ==
Regular season and playoffs results:

Legend: GP = Games played, W = Wins, L = Losses, T = Ties, OTL = Overtime losses, SL = Shoot-out losses, Pts = Points, GF = Goals for, GA = Goals against

Memorial Cup champions	OHL champions	OHL finalists

Season	Regular season											Playoffs
Season	GP	W	L	T	OTL	SOL	Pts	Pct	GF	GA	Finish	Playoffs
2002–03	68	11	45	5	7	—	34	0.250	158	275	5th West	Did not qualify
2003–04	68	16	45	3	4	—	39	0.287	161	228	5th West	Did not qualify
2004–05	68	18	42	4	4	—	44	0.324	150	260	4th West	Did not qualify
2005–06	68	36	30	—	2	0	74	0.544	242	246	2nd West	Lost conference quarterfinal (Guelph Storm) 4–0
2006–07	68	44	21	—	0	3	91	0.669	291	217	2nd West	Lost conference quarterfinal (Sault Ste. Marie Greyhounds) 4–2
2007–08	68	33	25	—	8	2	76	0.559	234	231	4th West	Lost conference quarterfinal (Sault Ste. Marie Greyhounds) 4–0
2008–09	68	36	24	—	4	4	80	0.588	235	219	2nd West	Won conference quarterfinal (Guelph Storm) 4–0; Lost conference semifinal (London Knights) 4–0
2009–10	68	34	27	—	4	3	74	0.544	240	230	4th West	Lost conference quarterfinal (Kitchener Rangers) 4–2
2010–11	68	40	22	—	4	2	86	0.632	243	207	1st West	Won conference quarterfinal (Guelph Storm) 4–2; Lost conference semifinal (Windsor Spitfires) 4–2
2011–12	68	33	27	—	1	7	74	0.544	259	259	3rd West	Won conference quarterfinal (Sarnia Sting) 4–2; Lost conference semifinal (London Knights) 4–2
2012–13	68	32	29	—	4	3	71	0.522	250	264	4th West	Lost conference quarterfinal (London Knights) 4–0
2013–14	68	33	30	—	4	1	71	0.522	254	248	3rd West	Lost conference quarterfinal (Erie Otters) 4–1
2014–15	68	29	36	—	2	1	61	0.449	212	271	3rd West	Lost conference quarterfinal (Sault Ste. Marie Greyhounds) 4–0
2015–16	68	24	37	—	4	3	55	0.404	209	282	4th West	Lost conference quarterfinal (Erie Otters) 4–0
2016–17	68	27	32	—	7	2	63	0.463	204	248	5th West	Did not qualify
2017–18	68	29	30	—	9	0	67	0.493	196	238	4th West	Lost conference quarterfinal (Sault Ste. Marie Greyhounds) 4–0
2018–19	68	45	17	—	3	3	96	0.706	294	218	1st West	Won conference quarterfinal (Sarnia Sting) 4–0; Won conference semifinal (Sault Ste. Marie Greyhounds) 4–2; Lost conference final (Guelph Storm) 4–3
2019–20	62	41	16	—	3	2	87	0.702	289	225	1st West	Playoffs cancelled due to the COVID-19 pandemic
2020–21	Season cancelled due to the COVID-19 pandemic											
2021–22	68	24	43	—	1	0	49	0.360	234	305	5th West	Did not qualify
2022–23	68	36	27	—	3	2	77	0.566	244	244	3rd West	Won conference quarterfinal (Flint Firebirds) 4–3; Lost conference semifinal (Sarnia Sting 4–0
2023–24	68	50	16	—	1	1	102	0.750	303	215	1st West	Won conference quarterfinal (Owen Sound Attack) 4–0; Won conference semifinal (Sault Ste. Marie Greyhounds) 4–3; Lost conference final (London Knights) 4–2; Won 2024 Memorial Cup final (London Knights) 4–3
2024–25	68	38	27	—	2	1	79	0.581	324	274	2nd West	Lost conference quarterfinal (Erie Otters) 4–1
2025–26	68	26	34	—	4	4	60	0.441	228	292	4th West	Lost conference quarterfinal (Kitchener Rangers) 4–0

== Uniforms and logos ==
The Saginaw Spirit logo depicts an American bald eagle with the colors of the Stars and Stripes along its neck, on the words "Saginaw Spirit." The uniform scheme is similar to that previously used by the U.S.A. national team. The home jerseys are white backgrounds with navy blue sleeves and red trim. The away jerseys are navy blue backgrounds with red sleeves and white trim. The Saginaw third jersey has a red background with navy blue sleeves and white trim, bearing across the chest the word "Saginaw" spelled diagonally downwards from left to right.

=== Mascots ===
Saginaw's main mascot is "Sammy Spirit," resembling an American bald eagle. The team held a vote on their website to name a new secondary mascot for the 2006–07 season. The mascot was named Steagle Colbeagle the Eagle after Stephen Colbert. Colbert had promoted the contest on his show, The Colbert Report. After naming the mascot after Colbert, the Spirit won seven straight games before losing to the Sarnia Sting on October 20. Since then, The Colbert Report had featured ongoing comedy sketches related to the team, the mascot, and other teams in the Ontario Hockey League, especially the Oshawa Generals, and Oshawa, Ontario mayor John Gray. At one game, Spirit fans threw copies of General Motors' annual report, a reference to the fact that GM, the Generals sponsor, having poor earnings at the time. As a result of losing the game, the mayor of Oshawa created Stephen Colbert day.

== Arena ==
The Spirit play at Wendler Arena (capacity 5,527), which is part of The Dow Event Center complex in downtown Saginaw. The OHL All-Star Classic was hosted here in 2007, the first time that the event was hosted in an American city.

== Radio and TV ==
Games can be heard live on WSGW-FM (100.5 FM) with Dillon Clark on play-by-play joined by Dennis Desrosiers and Domenic Papa on color commentary.

Reruns of games can be viewed on WNEM-DT2 ("WNEM TV5 Plus"). Live telecasts are streamed online via CHL TV in the U.S. and Canada and aired on Rogers Cable and Cogeco via the OHL Action Pak in Canada.

== Mid Michigan Spirit ==
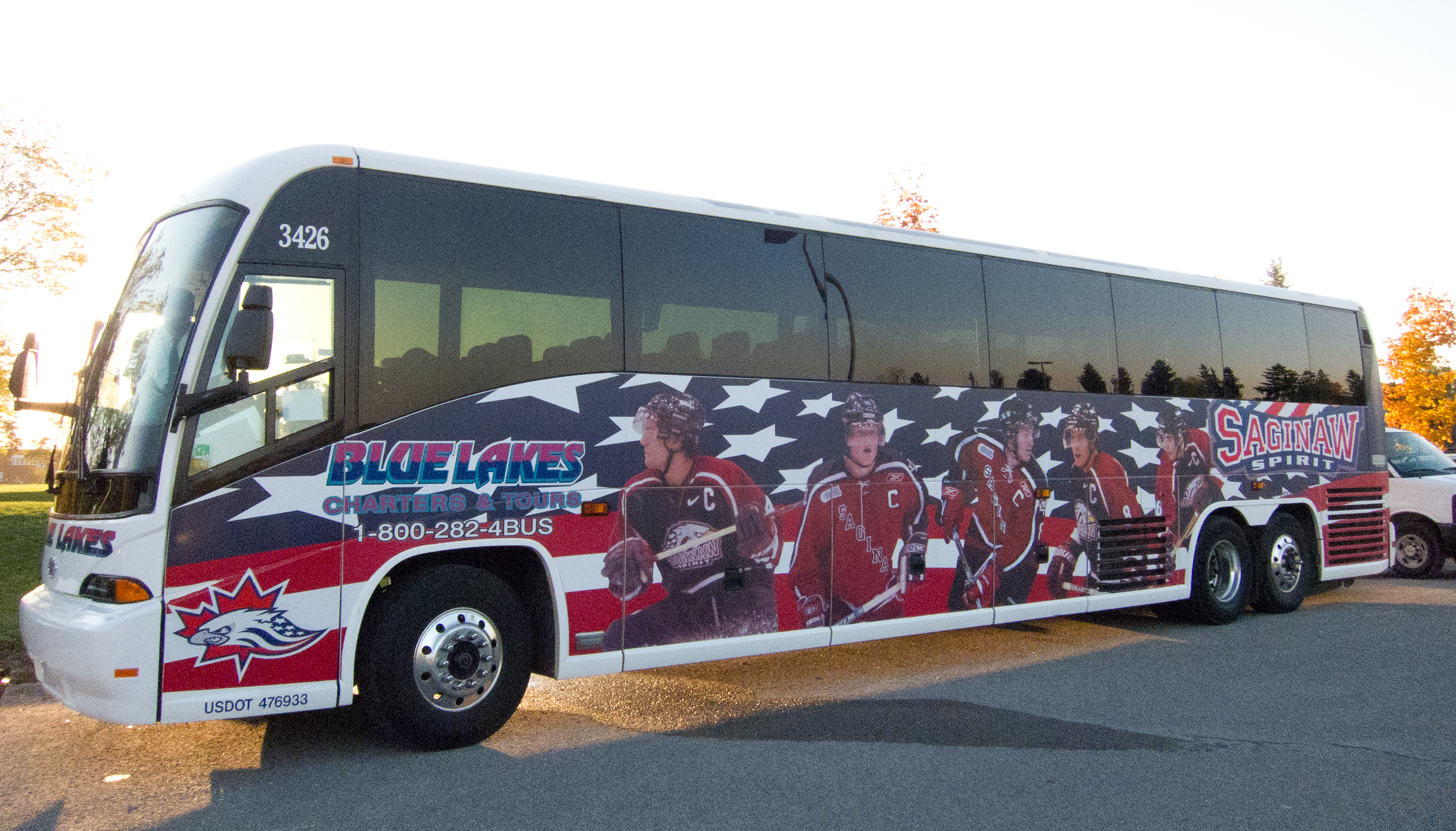
Saginaw Spirit team bus in October 2011

The Saginaw Spirit in partnership with Meijer food stores sponsor the Mid Michigan Spirit, a women's hockey club based in Midland, Michigan. The 16U team took second at the MAHA state tournament during the 2006–2007 season. A 16U team moved up to 19U for the 2007–2008 season and once again took second at the MAHA state tournament in Canton, Michigan on March 9, 2008.
