= Billy Sweezey =

American ice hockey player (born 1996)

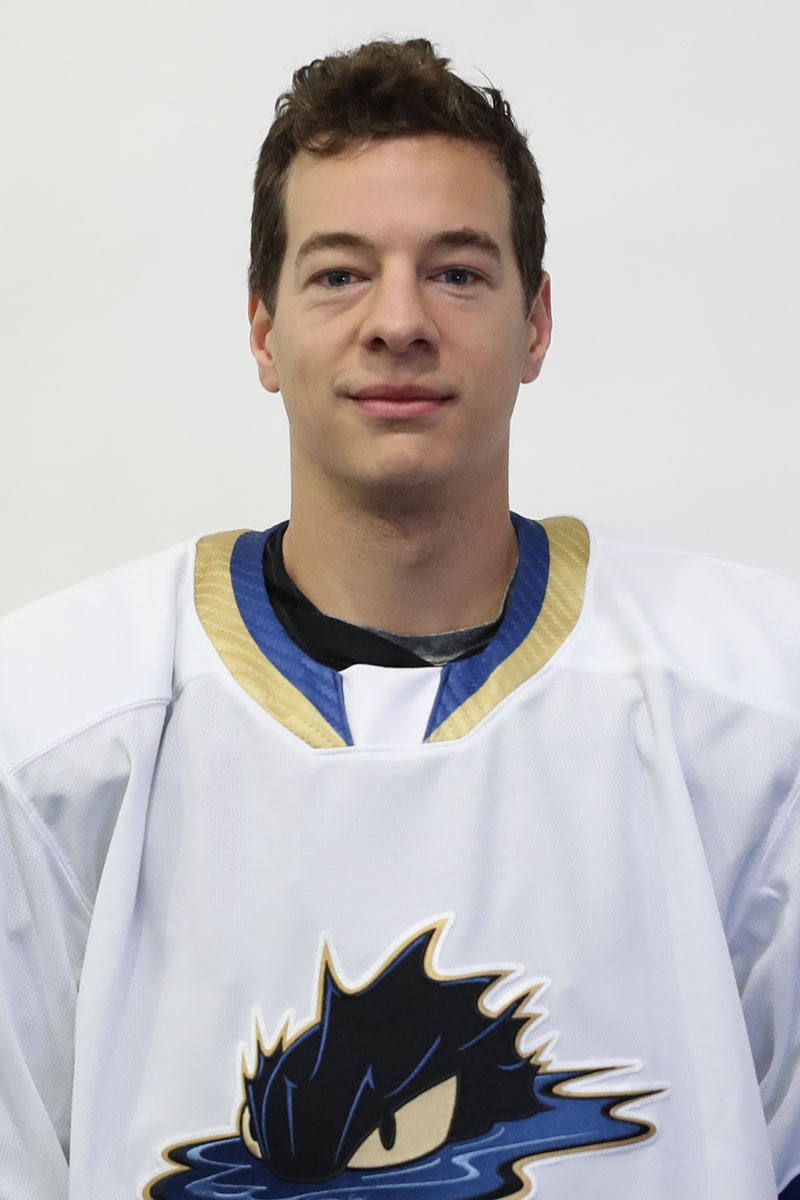
- Sweezey with the Cleveland Monsters
- Born: February 6, 1996 (age 30) Hanson, Massachusetts, U.S.
- Height: 6 ft 2 in (188 cm)
- Weight: 205 lb (93 kg; 14 st 9 lb)
- Position: Defense
- Shoots: Right
- NHL team (P) Cur. team Former teams: Boston Bruins; Providence Bruins (AHL); Columbus Blue Jackets
- NHL draft: Undrafted
- Playing career: 2021–present

Billy Sweezey (born February 6, 1996) is an American professional ice hockey defenseman for the Providence Bruins of the American Hockey League (AHL) while under contract to the Boston Bruins of the National Hockey League (NHL).

== Playing career ==
Sweezey played high school hockey with Noble and Greenough School within the Independent School League of New England before spending the conclusion of the 2014–15 season with the Dubuque Fighting Saints of the United States Hockey League (USHL).

In his only full season in the USHL in 2015–16, Sweezey appeared with the Chicago Steel before committing to a collegiate career with Yale University of the ECAC.

As a stay-at-home physical defensive defenseman, Sweezey played a full four seasons within the Bulldogs from 2016 to 2020, completing his collegiate career having appeared in 127 games for 3 goals and 29 points.

As an undrafted free agent, Sweezey began his professional career in the 2020–21 season, having signed a one-year AHL contract with the Wilkes-Barre/Scranton Penguins, the primary affiliate to the Pittsburgh Penguins, on April 24, 2020. In the pandemic shortened season, Sweezey in a third-pairing role made 22 appearances with the Penguins, collecting 4 assists.

In the following 2021–22 season, Sweezey continued in the AHL, securing a one-year contract with the Cleveland Monsters on July 12, 2021. Sweezey scored his first professional goal in his debut and season opening game for the Monsters, in a 4–0 victory over the Belleville Senators on October 22, 2021. Establishing himself within the Monsters blueline, Sweezey was later signed to his first NHL contract after agreeing to a two-year, two-way contract with affiliate, the Columbus Blue Jackets on March 7, 2022. With the Monsters unable to make the post-season, Sweezey notched new career highs with 4 goals and 11 points through 70 games.

In the first season of his contract with the Blue Jackets in 2022–23, Sweezey was reassigned to continue his tenure with the Cleveland Monsters in the AHL. Continuing to impress with his physical presence, Sweezey in his second recall to the Blue Jackets, made his NHL debut during a 3–2 shootout defeat to the Minnesota Wild on February 26, 2023. He was reassigned to the Monsters following his debut on February 28, 2023.

Following three seasons within the Blue Jackets organization, Sweezey left as a free agent and was signed to a two-year, two-way contract with the Boston Bruins on July 1, 2024.

On April 22, 2026, the Bruins announced that they had signed defenseman Billy Sweezey to a one-year, two-way contract extension through the 2026-27 season with an NHL cap hit of $850,000.

== Personal ==
Sweezey's father, Ken Sweezey, played collegiate hockey with Providence College in 1988–89. His mother Lorie Blair also played at Providence College.

== Career statistics ==
| | | | Regular season | | | | | Playoffs |
| Season | Team | League | GP | G | A | Pts | PIM | GP | G | A | Pts | PIM |
|---|---|---|---|---|---|---|---|---|---|---|---|---|
| 2012–13 | Noble and Greenough School | USHS | 27 | 1 | 8 | 9 | — | — | — | — | — | — |
| 2013–14 | Noble and Greenough School | USHS | 28 | 8 | 20 | 28 | — | — | — | — | — | — |
| 2014–15 | Noble and Greenough School | USHS | 27 | 5 | 18 | 23 | — | — | — | — | — | — |
| 2014–15 | Dubuque Fighting Saints | USHL | 3 | 0 | 0 | 0 | 4 | — | — | — | — | — |
| 2015–16 | Chicago Steel | USHL | 55 | 3 | 1 | 4 | 131 | — | — | — | — | — |
| 2016–17 | Yale University | ECAC | 33 | 1 | 5 | 6 | 40 | — | — | — | — | — |
| 2017–18 | Yale University | ECAC | 30 | 1 | 9 | 10 | 46 | — | — | — | — | — |
| 2018–19 | Yale University | ECAC | 32 | 1 | 4 | 5 | 26 | — | — | — | — | — |
| 2019–20 | Yale University | ECAC | 32 | 0 | 8 | 8 | 47 | — | — | — | — | — |
| 2020–21 | Wilkes-Barre/Scranton Penguins | AHL | 22 | 0 | 4 | 4 | 26 | — | — | — | — | — |
| 2021–22 | Cleveland Monsters | AHL | 70 | 4 | 7 | 11 | 114 | — | — | — | — | — |
| 2022–23 | Cleveland Monsters | AHL | 56 | 0 | 11 | 11 | 70 | — | — | — | — | — |
| 2022–23 | Columbus Blue Jackets | NHL | 9 | 0 | 1 | 1 | 9 | — | — | — | — | — |
| 2023–24 | Cleveland Monsters | AHL | 57 | 1 | 3 | 4 | 73 | 13 | 1 | 1 | 2 | 4 |
| 2024–25 | Providence Bruins | AHL | 64 | 1 | 9 | 10 | 67 | — | — | — | — | — |
| 2025–26 | Providence Bruins | AHL | 69 | 1 | 16 | 17 | 84 | 4 | 0 | 0 | 0 | 2 |
| NHL totals | | | 9 | 0 | 1 | 1 | 9 | — | — | — | — | — |
