= Paul Lawless (ice hockey) =

Canadian ice hockey player (born 1964)

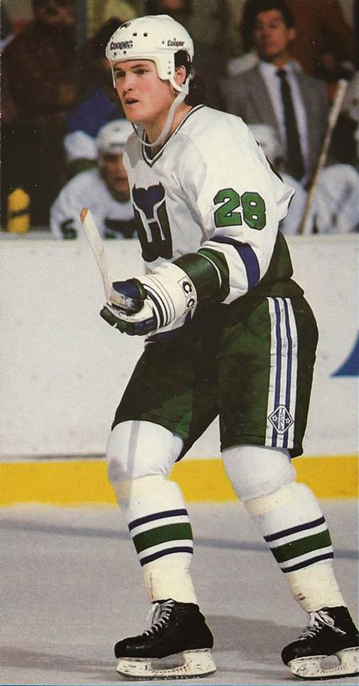
- Born: July 2, 1964 (age 61) Scarborough, Ontario, Canada
- Height: 5 ft 11 in (180 cm)
- Weight: 185 lb (84 kg; 13 st 3 lb)
- Position: Left wing
- Shot: Left
- Played for: Hartford Whalers; Philadelphia Flyers; Vancouver Canucks; Toronto Maple Leafs; Cincinnati Cyclones; Graz EC
- NHL draft: 14th overall, 1982; Hartford Whalers
- Playing career: 1983–1999

Paul J. Lawless (born July 2, 1964) is a Canadian former professional ice hockey left winger who played seven seasons in the National Hockey League (NHL) as a member of the Hartford Whalers, Philadelphia Flyers, Vancouver Canucks and Toronto Maple Leafs.

== Early life ==
Lawless was born in Scarborough, Ontario and raised in Toronto, Ontario. As a youth, he played in the 1977 Quebec International Pee-Wee Hockey Tournament with a minor ice hockey team from Toronto. He attended the Cedarbrae Collegiate Institute in Scarborough.

== Playing career ==
Lawless began his NHL career with the Hartford Whalers in 1984. He also played for the Philadelphia Flyers, Vancouver Canucks and Toronto Maple Leafs. He left the NHL after the 1989 season. He played several more years in the minor leagues and in Europe before retiring following the 1999 season.

== Awards ==
=== Hartford/Carolina records ===
- Most points in one game (6 vs. Toronto on Jan. 4, 1987, shares record)

=== IHL ===
- 1992–93: Cincinnati MVP
- 1993–94: IHL All-Star Second Team: (Cincinnati)
- Cincinnati Most career game-winning goals (22)
- Cincinnati Most career hat tricks (5)

=== Other ===
- 1983–84: OHL All-Star Second Team (Windsor)
- 1983–84: OHL All-Star Game (Windsor)
- 1983–84: Windsor Molson Cup (Three-Stars Leader)
- 1984–85: Salt Lake "Mr. Hustle" Award

== Career statistics ==
| | | | Regular season | | | | | Playoffs |
| Season | Team | League | GP | G | A | Pts | PIM | GP | G | A | Pts | PIM |
|---|---|---|---|---|---|---|---|---|---|---|---|---|
| 1980–81 | Wexford Raiders | OPJHL | 40 | 38 | 40 | 78 | | 4 | 3 | 1 | 4 | 2 |
| 1981–82 | Windsor Spitfires | OHL | 68 | 24 | 25 | 49 | 47 | 9 | 1 | 1 | 2 | 4 |
| 1982–83 | Hartford Whalers | NHL | 47 | 6 | 9 | 15 | 4 | — | — | — | — | — |
| 1982–83 | Windsor Spitfires | OHL | 33 | 15 | 20 | 35 | 25 | — | — | — | — | — |
| 1983–84 | Hartford Whalers | NHL | 6 | 0 | 3 | 3 | 0 | — | — | — | — | — |
| 1983–84 | Windsor Spitfires | OHL | 55 | 31 | 49 | 80 | 26 | 2 | 0 | 1 | 1 | 0 |
| 1984–85 | Binghamton Whalers | AHL | 8 | 1 | 1 | 2 | 0 | — | — | — | — | — |
| 1984–85 | Salt Lake Golden Eagles | IHL | 72 | 49 | 48 | 97 | 14 | 7 | 5 | 3 | 8 | 20 |
| 1985–86 | Hartford Whalers | NHL | 64 | 17 | 21 | 38 | 20 | 1 | 0 | 0 | 0 | 0 |
| 1986–87 | Hartford Whalers | NHL | 60 | 22 | 32 | 54 | 14 | 2 | 0 | 2 | 2 | 2 |
| 1987–88 | Hartford Whalers | NHL | 27 | 4 | 5 | 9 | 16 | — | — | — | — | — |
| 1987–88 | Philadelphia Flyers | NHL | 8 | 0 | 5 | 5 | 0 | — | — | — | — | — |
| 1987–88 | Vancouver Canucks | NHL | 13 | 0 | 1 | 1 | 0 | — | — | — | — | — |
| 1988–89 | Toronto Maple Leafs | NHL | 7 | 0 | 0 | 0 | 0 | — | — | — | — | — |
| 1988–89 | Milwaukee Admirals | IHL | 53 | 30 | 35 | 65 | 58 | — | — | — | — | — |
| 1989–90 | Newmarket Saints | AHL | 3 | 1 | 0 | 1 | 0 | — | — | — | — | — |
| 1989–90 | Toronto Maple Leafs | NHL | 6 | 0 | 1 | 1 | 0 | — | — | — | — | — |
| 1989–90 | HC Davos | CHE.2 | 16 | 8 | 21 | 29 | 49 | — | — | — | — | — |
| 1990–91 | HC Lausanne | CHE.2 | 34 | 36 | 43 | 79 | 99 | 8 | 8 | 8 | 16 | 46 |
| 1991–92 | HC Lausanne | CHE.2 | 29 | 29 | 39 | 68 | 38 | — | — | — | — | — |
| 1991–92 | HC Bolzano | ITA | 5 | 3 | 5 | 8 | 0 | 7 | 4 | 9 | 13 | 4 |
| 1992–93 | EC Graz | AUT | 29 | 21 | 27 | 48 | | — | — | — | — | — |
| 1992–93 | New Haven Senators | AHL | 20 | 10 | 12 | 22 | 63 | — | — | — | — | — |
| 1992–93 | Cincinnati Cyclones | IHL | 29 | 29 | 25 | 54 | 64 | — | — | — | — | — |
| 1993–94 | Cincinnati Cyclones | IHL | 71 | 30 | 27 | 57 | 112 | 11 | 4 | 4 | 8 | 4 |
| 1994–95 | Cincinnati Cyclones | IHL | 64 | 44 | 52 | 96 | 119 | 10 | 9 | 9 | 18 | 8 |
| 1995–96 | Cincinnati Cyclones | IHL | 77 | 27 | 58 | 85 | 99 | 17 | 4 | 6 | 10 | 16 |
| 1996–97 | Cincinnati Cyclones | IHL | 14 | 2 | 10 | 12 | 14 | — | — | — | — | — |
| 1996–97 | Austin Ice Bats | WPHL | 30 | 11 | 35 | 46 | 54 | 6 | 2 | 4 | 6 | 26 |
| 1997–98 | Austin Ice Bats | WPHL | 1 | 1 | 0 | 1 | 14 | — | — | — | — | — |
| 1998–99 | Austin Ice Bats | WPHL | 2 | 2 | 1 | 3 | 2 | — | — | — | — | — |
| NHL totals | | | 238 | 49 | 77 | 126 | 54 | 3 | 0 | 2 | 2 | 2 |
| IHL totals | | | 380 | 211 | 255 | 466 | 480 | 45 | 22 | 22 | 44 | 48 |

== Coaching record ==
| Team | Year | League | Regular season | | | | | | Postseason |
| Team | Year | League | G | W | L | T | OTL | Pct | Result |
|---|---|---|---|---|---|---|---|---|---|
| Austin Ice Bats | 1997-98 | WPHL | 14 | 7 | 6 | 0 | 1 | 0.536 | |
| Cincinnati Cyclones | 2001-02 | ECHL | 13 | 10 | 2 | 1 | 0 | 0.808 | Lost in round 2 |

| Preceded by Ron Francis | Hartford Whalers first-round draft pick 1982 | Succeeded by Sylvain Turgeon |
