= Providence Bruins =

American Hockey League team in Providence, Rhode Island

- City: Providence, Rhode Island
- League: American Hockey League
- Conference: Eastern
- Division: Atlantic
- Founded: 1987
- Home arena: Amica Mutual Pavilion
- Colors: Black, gold, white
- Owner: H. Larue Renfroe
- General manager: Vacant
- Head coach: Trent Whitfield
- Captain: Billy Sweezey
- Media: NESN; The Providence Journal; AHL.TV (Internet)
- Affiliates: Boston Bruins (NHL); Maine Mariners (ECHL)
- Website: www.providencebruins.com

Franchise history
- 1987–1992: Maine Mariners
- 1992–present: Providence Bruins

Championships
- Regular season titles: 4: (1998–99, 2007–08, 2012–13, 2025–26)
- Division titles: 9: (1992–93, 1998–99, 2002–03, 2007–08, 2012–13, 2019–20, 2020–21, 2022–23, 2025–26)
- Conference titles: 1: (1998–99)
- Calder Cups: 1: (1998–99)

The Providence Bruins are a professional ice hockey team based in Providence, Rhode Island. They are the American Hockey League (AHL) affiliate of the Boston Bruins of the National Hockey League (NHL). They play at the Amica Mutual Pavilion.

== History ==
The Providence Bruins began operation for the start of the 1992–93 AHL season after Providence mayor Buddy Cianci negotiated a deal with the owners of the Maine Mariners franchise, Frank DuRoss and Ed Anderson, to relocate their club. The move saw AHL hockey return to Providence for the first time since the Providence Reds, a founding member of the AHL, left town in 1977. They inherited the Mariners' affiliation with the NHL Bruins, which continues today. This predated the recent trend for AHL teams to be based closer to their NHL parents in order to facilitate player movement.

The Bruins captured their first AHL Calder Cup in the 1999 playoffs, after a regular season in which they dominated the league with 56 regular season wins. Led by rookie head coach Peter Laviolette and paced by Les Cunningham Award winner Randy Robitaille, the Bruins went from only 19 victories the previous season, to dropping the Rochester Americans four games to one to skate away with the league championship.

In the 2001–02 season, the Providence Bruins contracted with then-13-year-old musician Ben Schwartz to work as the official organist at all home games. As a result, Schwartz, who provided music for seven years until the conclusion of the 2007–08 season, is the youngest organist to ever work for a professional North American sports franchise.

In August 2006, DuRoss sold his majority interest in the club to Massachusetts businessman H. Larue Renfroe.

After the 2019–20 season was curtailed due to the COVID-19 pandemic, the Bruins moved to a temporary home in the New England Sports Center in Marlborough, Massachusetts, as the Dunkin' Donuts Center was being used by the state of Rhode Island for pandemic-related operations. The New England Sport Center is also owned by team owner H. Larue Renfroe. The Bruins returned to the Dunkin' Donuts Center for the 2021–22 AHL season.

In September 2022, the home arena was renamed to Amica Mutual Pavilion.

This market was previously served by:

- Providence Reds (1926–1977)

== Team mascot ==
"Samboni" the anthropomorphic bear serves as the Bruins' team mascot similar to the Boston Bruins' "Blades the Bruin".

== Season-by-season results ==
Calder Cup champions	Conference champions	Division champions

Records as of the 2025–26 AHL season.

Regular season												Playoffs					
Season	Games	Won	Lost	Tied	OTL	SOL	Points	PCT	Goals for	Goals against	Standing	Year	Prelims	1st round	2nd round	3rd round	Finals
1992–93	80	46	32	2	—	—	94	.588	384	348	1st, North	1993	—	L, 2–4, SPR	—	—	—
1993–94	80	28	39	13	—	—	69	.431	283	319	5th, North	1994	—	Did not qualify			
1994–95	80	39	30	11	—	—	89	.556	300	268	3rd, North	1995	—	W, 4–3, POR	L, 2–4, ALB	—	—
1995–96	80	30	36	10	4	—	74	.463	249	280	4th, North	1996	—	L, 1–3, SPR	—	—	—
1996–97	80	35	40	3	2	—	75	.469	262	289	4th, New England	1997	—	W, 3–2, WOR	L, 1–4, SPR	—	—
1997–98	80	19	49	7	5	—	50	.313	211	301	5th, New England	1998	—	Did not qualify			
1998–99	80	56	16	4	4	—	120	.750	321	223	1st, New England	1999	—	W, 3–1, WOR	W, 4–0, HWP	W, 4–2, FRE	W, 4–1, RCH
1999–00	80	33	38	6	3	—	75	.469	231	269	5th, New England	2000	—	W, 3–0, QUE	W, 4–0, LOW	L, 3–4, HWP	—
2000–01	80	35	31	10	4	—	84	.525	245	242	3rd, New England	2001	—	W, 3–2, HWP	W, 4–3, WOR	L, 1–4, SJF	—
2001–02	80	35	33	8	4	—	82	.513	190	223	3rd, East	2002	L, 0–2, SJM	—	—	—	—
2002–03	80	44	20	11	5	—	104	.650	268	227	1st, North	2003	BYE	L, 1–3, MTB	—	—	
2003–04	80	36	29	11	4	—	87	.544	170	170	4th, Atlantic	2004	L, 0–2, POR	—	—	—	—
2004–05	80	40	30	—	3	7	90	.563	211	202	4th, Atlantic	2005	—	W, 4–2, MCH	W, 4–1, LOW	L, 2–4, PHI	—
2005–06	80	43	31	—	1	5	92	.575	254	217	4th, Atlantic	2006	—	L, 2–4, POR	—	—	—
2006–07	80	44	30	—	2	4	94	.588	251	218	3rd, Atlantic	2007	—	W, 4–3, HWP	L, 2–4, MCH	—	—
2007–08	80	55	18	—	3	4	117	.731	280	206	1st, Atlantic	2008	—	W, 4–0, MCH	L, 2–4, POR	—	—
2008–09	80	43	29	—	2	6	94	.588	238	232	2nd, Atlantic	2009	—	W, 4–1, POR	W, 4–2, WOR	L, 1–4, HER	—
2009–10	80	36	38	—	5	1	78	.488	207	226	7th, Atlantic	2010	—	Did not qualify			
2010–11	80	38	36	—	3	3	82	.513	209	252	5th, Atlantic	2011	—	Did not qualify			
2011–12	76	35	34	—	3	4	77	.507	193	214	4th, Atlantic	2012	—	Did not qualify			
2012–13	76	50	21	—	0	5	105	.691	222	183	1st, Atlantic	2013	—	W, 3–2, HER	L, 3–4, WBS	—	—
2013–14	76	40	25	—	2	9	91	.599	233	210	3rd, Atlantic	2014	—	W, 3–2, SPR	L, 3–4, WBS	—	—
2014–15	76	41	26	—	7	2	91	.599	209	185	2nd, Atlantic	2015	—	L, 2–3, HFD	—	—	—
2015–16	76	41	22	—	9	4	95	.625	238	198	2nd, Atlantic	2016	—	L, 0–3, WBS	—	—	—
2016–17	76	43	23	—	6	4	96	.632	229	188	4th, Atlantic	2017	—	W, 3–2, WBS	W, 4–3, HER	L, 1–4, SYR	—
2017–18	76	45	26	—	3	2	95	.625	231	187	4th, Atlantic	2018	—	L, 1–3, LV	—	—	—
2018–19	76	38	27	—	8	3	87	.572	228	212	4th, Atlantic	2019	—	L, 1–3, CHA	—	—	—
2019–20	62	38	18	—	3	3	82	.661	197	154	1st, Atlantic	2020	Season cancelled due to the COVID-19 pandemic				
2020–21	25	15	6	—	2	2	32	.680	78	60	1st, Atlantic	2021	No playoffs were held				
2021–22	72	36	25	—	5	6	83	.576	199	192	3rd, Atlantic	2022	L, 0–2, BRI	—	—	—	—
2022–23	72	44	18	—	8	2	98	.681	221	201	1st, Atlantic	2023	BYE	L, 1–3, HFD	—	—	—
2023–24	72	42	21	—	6	3	93	.646	239	208	2nd, Atlantic	2024	BYE	L, 1–3, HFD	—	—	—
2024–25	72	41	23	—	5	3	90	.625	240	188	3rd, Atlantic	2025	W, 2–1, SPR	L, 2–3, CHA	—	—	—
2025–26	72	54	16	—	2	0	110	.764	239	162	1st, Atlantic	2026	BYE	L, 1–3, SPR	—	—	—

== Players ==
=== Current roster ===
Updated November 19, 2026.

No.	Nat	Player	Pos	S/G	Age	Acquired	Birthplace	Contract
47	(United States)	Joey Abate	LW	L	28	2022	Bloomingdale, Illinois	Providence
26	(Russia)	Maxim Andreev	LW	L	28	2026	Moscow, Russia	Providence
94	(Switzerland)	Attilo Biasca	F	L	23	2026	Zug, Switzerland	Boston
5	(United States)	Wyatt Bongiovanni	C	L	27	2026	Birmingham, Michigan	Providence
11	(United States)	Riley Duran	C	R	24	2024	Woburn, Massachusetts	Boston
24	(United States)	Ty Gallagher	D	R	23	2025	Clarkston, Michigan	Providence
16	(Canada)	Brendan Gaunce (A)	C	R	32	2026	Sudbury, Ontario	Boston
72	(Canada)	Alexis Gendron	RW	L	22	2026	Coteau-du-Lac, Quebec	Providence
82	(Canada)	Maxence Guenette	D	R	25	2026	Sainte-Foy, Quebec	Boston
12	(United States)	Brian Halonen	RW	R	27	2026	Delano, Minnesota	Boston
71	(United States)	Cross Hanas	LW	L	24	2026	Dallas, Texas	Providence
28	(United States)	Jordan Harris	D	L	26	2025	Haverhill, Massachusetts	Boston
49	(Czech Republic)	Ivan Ivan	C	L	24	2026	Ostrava, Czech Republic	Boston
15	(Sweden)	Loke Johansson	D	L	20	2025	Huddinge, Sweden	Boston
61	(Finland)	Henri Jokiharju	D	R	27	2026	Oulu, Finland	Boston
10	(Latvia)	Dans Locmelis	C	L	22	2025	Jelgava, Latvia	Boston
17	(Canada)	Navrin Mutter	LW	L	25	2026	Lucan, Ontario	Boston
29	(Canada)	Chris Ortiz	D	L	25	2026	Boisbriand, Quebec	Providence
18	(Canada)	Tobie Paquette-Bisson (A)	D	L	29	2026	Rosemère, Quebec	Providence
31	(Czech Republic)	Jiri Patera	G	L	27	2026	Praha, Czech Republic	Boston
75	(Germany)	Lukas Reichel	LW	L	24	2026	Nuremberg, Germany	Boston
8	(United States)	Jake Schmaltz	LW	L	25	2025	McFarland, Wisconsin	Providence
46	(United States)	Alex Steeves	LW	L	26	2025	Bedford, New Hampshire	Boston
6	(United States)	Billy Sweezey (C)	D	R	30	2024	Hanson, Massachusetts	Boston
9	(Canada)	Ryan Tattle	F	L	25	2026	Port Moody, British Columbia	Providence
34	(Czech Republic)	Simon Zajicek	G	L	25	2025	Frydlant, Czech Republic	Boston

=== Team captains ===
- Peter Laviolette, 1992–1993
- Bill Armstrong, 1993–1994
- Guy Larose, 1994–1995
- Martin Simard, 1995–1997
- Bill Armstrong, 1997–1998
- Dennis Vaske, 1998–1999
- Sean Pronger, 1999–2000
- Brandon Smith, 2000–2001
- Keith McCambridge, 2001–2002
- Rich Brennan, 2002–2004
- Jay Henderson, 2004–2005
- Sean Curry, 2005–2006
- Nate Thompson, 2006–2008
- Jeremy Reich, 2008–2009
- Trent Whitfield, 2009–2010
- Jeremy Reich, 2010–2011
- Trent Whitfield, 2011–2013
- Mike Moore, 2013–2014
- Craig Cunningham, 2014–2015
- Tommy Cross, 2015–2018
- Jordan Szwarz, 2018–2019
- Paul Carey, 2019–2021
- Josiah Didier, 2022–2023
- Patrick Brown, 2024–2026
- Billy Sweezey, 2026–present

=== Head coaches ===
- Mike O'Connell, 1992–1994
- Steve Kasper, 1994–1995
- Bob Francis, 1995–1997
- Tom McVie, 1997–1998
- Peter Laviolette, 1998–2000
- Bill Armstrong, 2000–2002
- Mike Sullivan, 2002
- Scott Gordon, 2003–2008
- Rob Murray, 2008–2011
- Bruce Cassidy, 2011–2016
- Kevin Dean, 2016–2017
- Jay Leach, 2017–2021
- Ryan Mougenel, 2021–2026
- Trent Whitfield, 2026-present

=== American Hockey League Hall of Famers ===
AHL Hall of Fame Honored Members
Name	Seasons	Induction Year
Keith Aucoin	2002-03, 2004-05 (player)	2022
Dennis Bonvie	2001-02 (player)	2024
Chris Bourque	2012-13 (player)	2026
Mitch Lamoureux	1995-97 (player)	2011
Rob Murray	2003-08 (asst. coach); 2008-11 (head coach)	2017
Tim Tookey	1994-95 (player)	2008
Jim Wiemer	1992-94 (player)	2026

=== Notable alumni ===
List of Providence Bruins alumni who played more than 100 games in Providence and 100 or more games in the National Hockey League:

- Keith Aucoin
- Matt Bartkowski
- Nick Boynton
- Wade Brookbank
- Paul Carey
- Jordan Caron
- Connor Clifton
- Austin Czarnik
- Kevin Dallman
- Aaron Downey
- Peter Ferraro
- Trent Frederic
- Jonathan Girard
- John Grahame
- Ben Guite
- Andy Hilbert
- Jamie Huscroft
- Milan Jurcina
- Antti Laaksonen
- Jeremy Lauzon
- Cameron Mann
- Brad Marchand
- Adam McQuaid
- Kevan Miller
- Eric Nickulas
- Colton Orr
- Chris Porter
- Tuukka Rask
- Andrew Raycroft
- Jeremy Reich
- Randy Robitaille
- Jon Rohloff
- Andre Roy
- Ryan Spooner
- Cam Stewart
- Mark Stuart
- Tim Sweeney
- Tim Thomas
- Nate Thompson
- Mattias Timander
- Chris Wagner
- Trent Whitfield
- Landon Wilson
- Sergei Zholtok

== Franchise records and leaders ==
Single season
Goals: Tim Sweeney, 41, (1992–93)
Assists: Randy Robitaille, 74, (1998–99)
Points: Randy Robitaille, 102, (1998–99)
Penalty minutes: Aaron Downey, 407, (1997–98)
GAA: Tim Thomas, 1.84, (2003–04)
SV%: Tim Thomas, .941, (2003–04)

Career
Career goals: Andy Hilbert, 101, (2001–2005)
Career assists: Georgii Merkulov, 146, (2022-2026)
Career points: Georgii Merkulov, 240, (2022–2026)
Career penalty minutes: Aaron Downey, 1059, (1997–2000, 2007)
Career goaltending wins: Zane McIntyre, 86, (2015–2019)
Career shutouts: Zane McIntyre, 11, (2015–2019)
Career games: Tommy Cross, 380, (2011-2021)

=== Scoring leaders ===
These are the top-ten point-scorers for the Providence Bruins in the AHL. Figures are updated after each completed season.

Note: Pos = Position; GP = Games played; G = Goals; A = Assists; Pts = Points; P/G = Points per game; = current Providence player

Points
Player	Pos	GP	G	A	Pts	P/G
Georgii Merkulov	LW	271	94	146	240	.89
Andy Hilbert	C	234	101	109	210	.90
Sergei Zholtok	C	196	83	103	186	.95
Andre Savage	C	191	71	104	175	.92
Tim Sweeney	LW	121	71	101	172	1.42
Alexander Khokhlachev	C	197	61	110	171	.87
Pascal Pelletier	C	206	71	99	170	.82
Fabian Lysell	C	219	57	106	163	.74
Cameron Mann	RW	182	73	86	159	.87
Seth Griffith	C	165	56	102	158	.96

=== Retired numbers ===
Providence Bruins retired numbers
No.	Player	Position	Career	No. retirement
25	Colby Cave	C	2014-2019	April 4, 2022
