= Ben Simon =

American ice hockey player (born 1978)

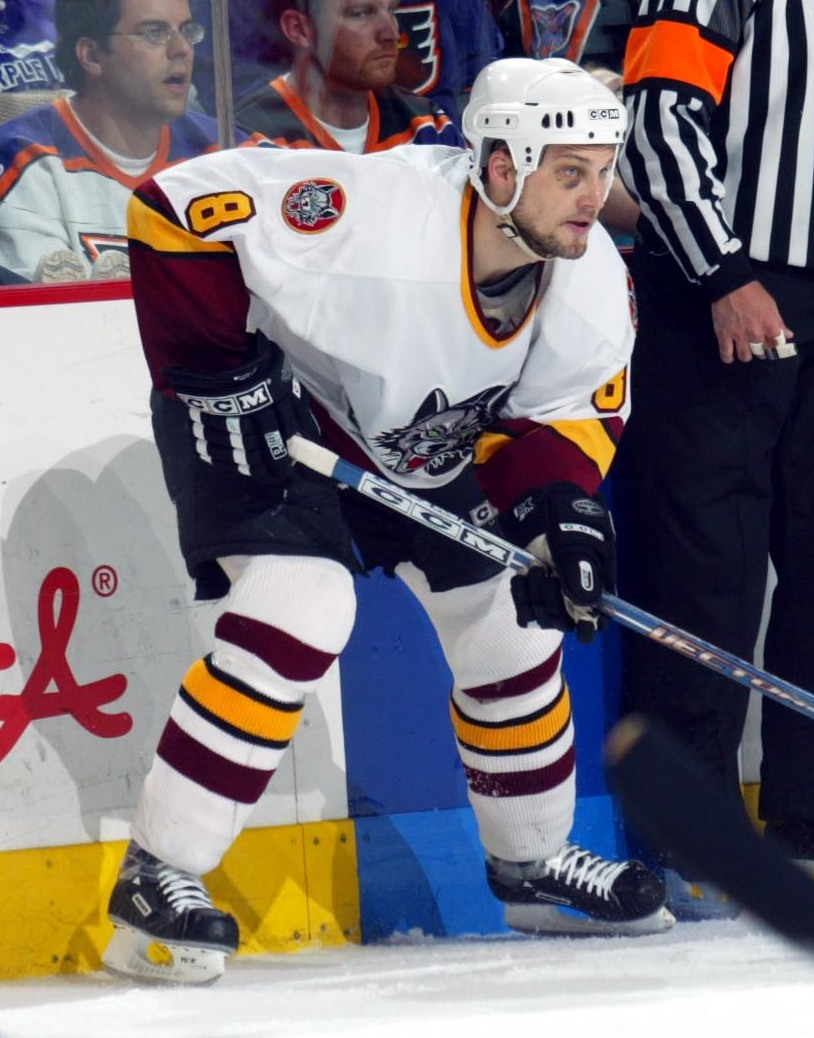
- Simon during the 2005 Calder Cup Finals
- Born: June 14, 1978 (age 47) Shaker Heights, Ohio, U.S.
- Height: 6 ft 0 in (183 cm)
- Weight: 195 lb (88 kg; 13 st 13 lb)
- Position: Center
- Shot: Left
- Played for: Atlanta Thrashers; Columbus Blue Jackets
- NHL draft: 110th overall, 1997; Chicago Blackhawks
- Playing career: 2000–2011

Benjamin Clarke Simon (born June 14, 1978) is an American former professional ice hockey center who played in the National Hockey League (NHL) for the Atlanta Thrashers and Columbus Blue Jackets between 2001 and 2006. He was the head coach of the ECHL's Cincinnati Cyclones for the 2013–14 season, guiding the club to a conference championship. Simon served as an assistant coach for the American Hockey League's Toronto Marlies in 2014–15 and the Grand Rapids Griffins from 2015 to 2018. He was then promoted to head coach of the Griffins for the 2018–19 season.

== Playing career ==
Simon grew up playing hockey for Shaker Heights High School as well as Team Ohio Midget AAA and the Cleveland Junior Barons. He was drafted 110th overall by the Chicago Blackhawks in the 1997 NHL entry draft and has played 81 games in the NHL with the Atlanta Thrashers and Columbus Blue Jackets, scoring three goals and one assist. In the 2007–08 AHL season, he played for the Springfield Falcons. For the 2008–09 season, Simon played with the Iserlohn Roosters in Germany's Deutsche Eishockey Liga. In July 2010, he signed up for his first coaching role, as Player/Coach for the Sheffield Steelers in the British Elite Ice Hockey League for the 2010–11 season. After winning the regular season championship with the Steelers, Simon decided not to return to the Steelers for another season.

== Career statistics ==
=== Regular season and playoffs ===
			Regular season					Playoffs
Season	Team	League	GP	G	A	Pts	PIM	GP	G	A	Pts	PIM
1993–93	Shaker Heights High School	HS-OH	25	15	21	36	—	—	—	—	—	—
1993–94	Shaker Heights High School	HS-OH	24	45	41	86	—	—	—	—	—	—
1994–95	Shaker Heights High School	HS-OH	25	61	68	129	—	—	—	—	—	—
1995–96	Cleveland Jr. Barons	NAHL	50	45	46	91	—	5	7	13	20	—
1996–97	University of Notre Dame	CCHA	30	4	15	19	79	—	—	—	—	—
1997–98	University of Notre Dame	CCHA	37	9	28	37	89	—	—	—	—	—
1998–99	University of Notre Dame	CCHA	37	18	24	42	65	—	—	—	—	—
1999–00	University of Notre Dame	CCHA	40	13	19	32	53	—	—	—	—	—
2000–01	Orlando Solar Bears	IHL	77	8	12	20	47	16	6	5	11	20
2001–02	Atlanta Thrashers	NHL	6	0	0	0	0	—	—	—	—	—
2001–02	Chicago Wolves	AHL	74	11	23	34	56	25	2	3	5	24
2002–03	Atlanta Thrashers	NHL	10	0	1	1	9	—	—	—	—	—
2002–03	Chicago Wolves	AHL	69	15	17	32	78	9	0	0	0	6
2003–04	Atlanta Thrashers	NHL	52	3	0	3	28	—	—	—	—	—
2003–04	Milwaukee Admirals	AHL	18	1	3	4	6	—	—	—	—	—
2004–05	Chicago Wolves	AHL	53	11	10	21	58	18	1	5	6	44
2005–06	Columbus Blue Jackets	NHL	13	0	0	0	4	—	—	—	—	—
2005–06	Syracuse Crunch	AHL	66	13	24	37	93	3	0	1	1	2
2006–07	Syracuse Crunch	AHL	56	9	12	21	77	—	—	—	—	—
2006–07	Grand Rapids Griffins	AHL	21	4	5	9	28	7	0	0	0	9
2007–08	Springfield Falcons	AHL	80	12	10	22	88	—	—	—	—	—
2008–09	Iserlohn Roosters	DEL	51	5	10	15	64	—	—	—	—	—
2009–10	Kalamazoo Wings	ECHL	18	4	9	13	16	3	3	0	3	14
2009–10	Toronto Marlies	AHL	44	2	6	8	51	—	—	—	—	—
2010–11	Sheffield Steelers	EIHL	54	21	36	57	62	3	2	0	2	12
AHL totals			481	78	110	188	535	62	3	9	12	85
NHL totals			81	3	1	4	47	—	—	—	—	—

=== International ===
Year	Team	Event	GP	G	A	Pts	PIM
1997	United States	WJC	6	0	0	0	4
1998	United States	WJC	7	1	3	4	8
Junior totals			13	1	3	4	12

== Awards and honors ==
Award	Year
All-CCHA Second Team	1998–99
