= Ron Smith (ice hockey, born 1944) =

- Born: January 28, 1944 Galt, Ontario, Canada
- Died: January 2, 2017 (aged 72) Hamilton, Ontario, Canada
- Coached for: New York Rangers
- Coaching career: 1975–2004

Ron Smith (January 28, 1944 – January 2, 2017) was a Canadian professional ice hockey coach in the American Hockey League (AHL) and the National Hockey League (NHL). Smith held various coaching roles including head coach of the Binghamton Rangers of the AHL from 1991 to 1993 and was the interim head coach for the New York Rangers of the NHL in 1993. Smith was inducted into the Cambridge Sports Hall of Fame in 2002.

== Early life and education ==
Smith was born on January 28, 1944, in Galt, Ontario. He was an athlete on multiple teams during his education at Glenview Park Secondary School. He completed additional schooling at the University of Waterloo.

== Career ==
As a baseball player in 1964, Smith signed with the San Francisco Giants and played in the minor leagues for the Magic Valley Cowboys and the Decatur Commodores. After leaving baseball, Smith began his hockey career playing for the Galt Hornets from 1968 to 1974. Following his time with the Hornets, Smith started his coaching career. He led the Guelph Platers from 1975 to 1978 and was an assistant coach for the Buffalo Sabres in 1980. Later on, Smith worked with the Vancouver Canucks from 1981 to 1985 and the New Jersey Devils from 1986 to 1988. Smith returned to the Guelph Platers as their coach from 1989 to 1991 before becoming the coach for the Binghamton Rangers from 1991 to 1993.

Smith replaced Roger Neilson in January 1993 as an interim head coach for the New York Rangers during the 1992–93 NHL season. Smith was the Rangers coach for 44 games before being replaced by Mike Keenan in April 1993. Smith returned to Vancouver as an assistant coach for the next two seasons, and was alongside head coach Pat Quinn for the Canucks' run to the 1994 Stanley Cup Final. Additional NHL teams that Smith was an assistant coach for include the Toronto Maple Leafs and the Carolina Hurricanes. With the Hurricanes, Smith was also a scout during the 2006 Stanley Cup and remained with the team until his retirement in 2014.

Outside of the NHL, Smith coached the Cincinnati Cyclones from 1995 to 2001 and the Lowell Lock Monsters from 2001 to 2004. Other non-coaching positions Smith held include a director role for the Canadian Olympic team and the Ontario Hockey Association.

== Death ==
Smith died on January 2, 2017, in Hamilton, Ontario.

== Awards and honors ==
In 2002, Smith was inducted into the Cambridge Sports Hall of Fame.
