= Chris Cichocki =

American ice hockey player, coach, and scout

- Born: September 17, 1963 (age 62) Detroit, Michigan, U.S.A.
- Height: 5 ft 11 in (180 cm)
- Weight: 185 lb (84 kg; 13 st 3 lb)
- Position: Right wing
- Shot: Right
- Played for: Detroit Red Wings; New Jersey Devils
- NHL draft: Undrafted
- Playing career: 1985–1997

Christopher J. Cichocki (born September 17, 1963) is an American retired ice hockey right winger. He played 68 games in the National Hockey League for the Detroit Red Wings and New Jersey Devils between 1985 and 1988. The rest of his career, which lasted from 1985 to 1998, was mainly spent in the minor leagues. After his playing career Cichocki was a coach in the ECHL. Since 2009 has been a scout for the Edmonton Oilers.

== Professional career ==
=== Minor league hockey ===
While playing for the Grosse Pointe Bruins in midget AAA, Cichocki put up 50 goals and 70 assists in 70 games to lead the league with 120 points for the 1979–80 season. He then spent two years playing in the Great Lakes Junior Hockey League before deciding to attend college at Michigan Technological University. In 1983 he was chosen to represent team USA in World Junior Tournament in Leningrad Russia. In both his sophomore & junior seasons he led the Huskies in scoring. The hockey world took notice of his skills and Cichocki was signed as a free agent by his hometown team, the Detroit Red Wings, on June 28, 1985.

=== Playing in the NHL ===
Cichocki began playing for his hometown Red Wings during the 1985–86 season. He played 59 games of the season and posted 21 points on the season. However the Red Wings were going through roster changes, trying to find a winning combination to play alongside Steve Yzerman and Gerard Gallant, and Cichocki didn't always fit into the equation. For the 1986–87 season, Cichocki only played two games for the Detroit club, but was a powerful force on Detroit's farm team, the Adirondack Red Wings. In 55 games he contributed 65 points and helped Adirondack march into the playoffs. However, in Detroit's effort to find veteran leadership, Cichocki was traded before the end of the season on March 9, 1987, to the New Jersey Devils. Mel Bridgman made the trip to Detroit for Cichocki and Detroit's 3rd round draft pick. Cichocki finished out the 1986–87 season with the Maine Mariners, scoring four points in seven games.

The following seasons saw Cichocki start fresh, playing for New Jersey's farm team the Utica Devils. He scored 66 points in 1987–88 and 63 points in 1988–89. During that span he played in seven games for the New Jersey Devils, scoring one goal, one assist and four penalty minutes. In 1989, Cichocki chipped in an assist during Utica's short playoff run.

After beginning the 1989–90 season with Utica, Cichocki was traded to the Hartford Whalers for Jim Thomson on October 31, 1989. Cichocki was quickly placed on Hartford's farm team the Binghamton Whalers and again started to put up big numbers. In four seasons with the Binghamton Whalers (renamed the Binghamton Rangers in 1990), Cichocki chalked up 221 points, including three 50-point seasons and 18 points within three playoff runs, all of which ended in the semi-finals to division rival the Rochester Americans.

After the 1992–93 season, Cichocki's contract was over and he decided to continue his career with the Cincinnati Cyclones of the International Hockey League. Cichocki acquired 120 points in four seasons of play for the Cyclones, with his largest total of 52 coming in the 1994–95 season. Still the Cyclones could not find post-season success, never being able to reach the finals in four years of postseason play. After playing just six games for the Cyclones in 1997–98, Cichocki officially retired on October 23, 1997.

=== Cichocki the coach ===
The Cyclones needed an assistant coach and Cichocki was retiring at just the right time. Cichocki took over the position and would remain assistant coach until the IHL folded at the end of the 1999–2000 season. He helped lead the Cyclones to winning records each year and into the playoffs. After Cincinnati, Cichocki was offered the head coaching job and the position of Director of Hockey Operations for the Arkansas RiverBlades of the ECHL. He accepted and led the RiverBlades to a 34-24-14 record and their first shot at the playoffs, eventually losing in the second round to the South Carolina Stingrays. After two more winning seasons, including 2002–03 in which Arkansas saw Cichocki setting team records in both wins and points, Cichocki was invited to return to Cincinnati to Head Coach the new Cyclones for the 2003–04 season and received a warm welcome as the fans reacted to having him back. However the excitement was short-lived as the Cyclones finished dead-last in the Northern division with a 25-43-4 record, and with the lowest point total in the franchise's history. The Cyclones suspended operations the following season and Cichocki decided to take the year off from coaching after his dismal season. But he decided to return to coaching when he took over the Head Coach position for the newly formed Stockton Thunder in 2005. The Thunder finished with an 18-40-14 record, good enough for last in the Pacific division. Cichocki was given another chance and in the 2006–07 season, turned the club around with a 36-point increase, finishing with a record of 38-22-10 and reaching the Kelly Cup Playoffs for the first time in the club's history. The Thunder lost in the Semi-finals to the Idaho Steelheads after an intense six-game series. That season also saw Cichocki selected as one of four coaches to coach in the 2007 Rbk Hockey ECHL All-Star Game. On April 5, 2007, Cichocki was granted a three-year contract extension to coach the Thunder through 2010. However, he was fired on December 29, 2008.

Currently he is a Pro Scout with the Edmonton Oilers.

== Personal life ==
Cichocki has a wife Val and two children, Quinn and Carly.

== Career statistics ==
=== Regular season and playoffs ===
			Regular season					Playoffs
Season	Team	League	GP	G	A	Pts	PIM	GP	G	A	Pts	PIM
1980–81	Paddock Pools	GLJHL	—	—	—	—	—	—	—	—	—	—
1981–82	Paddock Pools	GLJHL	—	—	—	—	—	—	—	—	—	—
1982–83	Michigan Tech	CCHA	36	12	10	22	10	—	—	—	—	—
1983–84	Michigan Tech	CCHA	40	25	20	45	36	—	—	—	—	—
1984–85	Michigan Tech	CCHA	40	30	24	54	14	—	—	—	—	—
1985–86	Detroit Red Wings	NHL	59	10	11	21	21	—	—	—	—	—
1985–86	Adirondack Red Wings	AHL	9	4	4	8	6	—	—	—	—	—
1986–87	Detroit Red Wings	NHL	2	0	0	0	2	—	—	—	—	—
1986–87	Adirondack Red Wings	AHL	55	31	34	65	27	—	—	—	—	—
1986–87	Maine Mariners	AHL	7	2	2	4	0	—	—	—	—	—
1987–88	New Jersey Devils	NHL	5	1	0	1	2	—	—	—	—	—
1987–88	Utica Devils	AHL	69	36	30	66	66	—	—	—	—	—
1988–89	New Jersey Devils	NHL	2	0	1	1	2	—	—	—	—	—
1988–89	Utica Devils	AHL	59	32	31	63	50	5	0	1	1	2
1989–90	Utica Devils	AHL	11	3	1	4	10	—	—	—	—	—
1989–90	Binghamton Whalers	AHL	60	21	26	47	22	—	—	—	—	—
1990–91	Binghamton Rangers	AHL	80	35	30	65	70	9	0	4	4	2
1991–92	Binghamton Rangers	AHL	75	28	29	57	132	6	5	4	9	4
1992–93	Binghamton Rangers	AHL	65	23	29	52	78	9	3	2	5	25
1993–94	Cincinnati Cyclones	IHL	69	22	20	42	101	11	2	2	4	12
1994–95	Cincinnati Cyclones	IHL	75	22	30	52	50	8	0	3	3	6
1995–96	Cincinnati Cyclones	IHL	57	4	7	11	30	14	0	1	1	10
1996–97	Cincinnati Cyclones	IHL	35	6	9	15	30	1	0	0	0	0
1997–98	Cincinnati Cyclones	IHL	6	0	0	0	0	—	—	—	—	—
AHL totals			490	215	216	431	461	29	8	11	19	33
NHL totals			68	11	12	23	27	—	—	—	—	—

=== International ===
Year	Team	Event	GP	G	A	Pts	PIM
1983	United States	WJC	7	0	1	1	0
Junior totals			7	0	1	1	0
