= 2012 IIHF World Championship Division I =

Tournament details
- Host countries: Slovenia; Poland
- Venues: 2 (in 2 host cities)
- Dates: 15 – 21 April
- Teams: 12

The 2012 IIHF World Championship Division I was an international Ice hockey tournament run by the International Ice Hockey Federation. Group A was contested in Ljubljana, Slovenia and Group B was contested in Krynica, Poland with both tournaments running from 15–21 April 2012.

In Group A both Austria and Slovenia were promoted back to the highest level after being relegated from there in 2011. Ukraine was relegated despite winning their final game against Japan. The Japanese, returning to play after a one-year absence, finished fourth attaining an overall placement of 20th. This is the highest they have placed since being relegated to this level in 2004 when the Asian qualifiers for the world championships ceased.

In Group B the South Koreans defeated Poland on the final day to earn promotion to Group A. For the Korean team, this assures them of the highest world championships placement in their history when they play in 2013. The host Poles did not trail a game until 8:21 left in their final match but could not equalize and ended up second. Australia and Romania, the two teams who had moved up from Division II for this year's tournament, faced off on the final day to determine relegation. Australia needed to win by two goals, but failed to do so, and finished last.

== Participants ==
=== Group A ===
Team	Qualification
Austria	Placed 15th in the Elite Division and were relegated in 2011.
Slovenia	Host, placed 16th in the Elite Division and were relegated in 2011.
Hungary	Placed 2nd in Division I Group A last year.
Great Britain	Placed 2nd in Division I Group B last year.
Japan	Did not participate in 2011 due to the 2011 Tōhoku earthquake and tsunami and was guaranteed a place in the 2012 tournament.
Ukraine	Placed 3rd in Division I B last year.

=== Group B ===
Team	Qualification
South Korea	Placed 3rd in Division I Group A last year.
Poland	Host, placed 4th in Division I Group B last year.
Netherlands	Placed 4th in Division I Group A last year.
Lithuania	Placed 5th in Division I B last year.
Romania	Placed 1st in Division II B last year and was promoted.
Australia	Placed 1st in Division II A last year and was promoted.

== Group A Tournament ==
=== Standings ===
Promoted to Elite Division for 2013
Relegated to Division I B for 2013

Team	GP	W	OTW	OTL	L	GF	GA	GDF	PTS
Slovenia	5	5	0	0	0	17	9	+8	15
Austria	5	3	0	1	1	24	16	+8	10
Hungary	5	2	0	0	3	15	18	−3	6
Japan	5	1	1	1	2	13	14	−1	6
Great Britain	5	1	1	0	3	14	22	−8	5
Ukraine	5	0	1	1	3	12	16	−4	3

All times are local (UTC+2).

15 April 2012; 13:00	Japan	1–5 (0–2, 0–2, 1–1)	Hungary	Arena Stožice, Ljubljana; Attendance: 1,652

Game reference

Masahito Haruna
Yuta Narisawa
Goalies
Bence Balizs
Referee:
(Finland) Aleksi Rantala
Linesmen:
(Slovenia) Matjaz Hribar
(Netherlands) Joep Leermakers

	0–1	05:39 – B. Magosi (L. Sikorcin, I. Bartalis)
	0–2	12:02 – A. Horvath (C. Kovács, I. Bartalis)
	0–3	33:18 – I. Sofron (B. Ladányi) (PP)
	0–4	39:13 – C. Kovács (T. Pozsgai) (PP)
	0–5	55:13 – A. Mihály (J. Hári, J. Vas)
S. Yanadori (T. Yamashita) – 57:49	1–5

33 min
Penalties
12 min
34
Shots
25

15 April 2012; 16:30	Ukraine	4–5 (1–1, 2–4, 1–0)	Austria	Arena Stožice, Ljubljana; Attendance: 1,419

Game reference

Igor Karpenko
Goalies
Bernhard Starkbaum
Referee:
(Russia) Alexei Ravodin
Linesmen:
(Switzerland) Roman Kaderli
(Czech Republic) Rudolf Tosenovjan

	0–1	03:01 – M. Geier (R. Herburger, S. Geier) (PP)
O. Tymchenko (K. Kasianchuk, O. Materukhin) (PP) – 13:07	1–1
	1–2	20:47 – T. Raffl (M. Trattnig, S. Ulmer)
	1–3	21:36 – J. Kirsits (M. Herburger, M. Geier)
	1–4	22:24 – D. Welser (S. Ulmer, M. Grabner)
	1–5	29:18 – T. Koch (D. Welser)
O. Pobyedonostsev (V. Lyutkevych, O. Materukhin) (PP) – 32:20	2–5
O. Tymchenko (O. Pobyedonostsev) – 34:36	3–5
O. Tymchenko (O. Materukhin) (PP) – 57:02	4–5

20 min
Penalties
10 min
27
Shots
25

15 April 2012; 20:00	Great Britain	2–3 (1–2, 1–0, 0–1)	Slovenia	Arena Stožice, Ljubljana; Attendance: 9,861

Game reference

Stephen Murphy
Goalies
Robert Kristan
Referee:
(Slovakia) Jozef Kubus
Linesmen:
(United States) Paul Carnathan
(Canada) Matt Traub

	0–1	03:35 – Ž. Jeglič (R. Sabolič)
C. Shields (R. Dowd, C. Peacock) – 06:31	1–1
	1–2	12:35 – D. Rodman (A. Music)
C. Peacock (C. Shields) – 21:15	2–2
	2–3	56:01 – T. Razingar (R. Pajič, A. Tavzelj)

14 min
Penalties
14 min
22
Shots
35

16 April 2012; 13:00	Hungary	3–1 (2–0, 0–0, 1–1)	Ukraine	Arena Stožice, Ljubljana; Attendance: 1,020

Game reference

Bence Balizs
Goalies
Mykhailo Balaban
Referee:
(Slovakia) Jozef Kubus
Linesmen:
(Switzerland) Roman Kaderli
(Slovenia) Damir Rakovic

N. Galanisz (C. Kovács, A. Benk) – 10:04	1–0
L. Sikorcin (I. Bartalis) – 11:35	2–0
	2–1	43:43 – O. Pobyedonostsev (O. Materukhin, M. Balaban) (PP)
J. Vas (M. Vas) (ENG) – 58:46	3–1

24 min
Penalties
12 min
23
Shots
37

16 April 2012; 16:30	Austria	7–3 (3–0, 2–2, 2–1)	Great Britain	Arena Stožice, Ljubljana; Attendance: 986

Game reference

Bernhard Starkbaum
Goalies
Stephen Murphy
Referee:
(Finland) Aleksi Rantala
Linesmen:
(United States) Paul Carnathan
(Netherlands) Joep Leermakers

T. Hundertpfund (D. Welser) (PP) – 07:48	1–0
G. Baumgartner – 09:12	2–0
M. Latusa (D. Oberkofler) – 09:37	3–0
G. Baumgartner (M. Latusa, S. Ulmer) (PP) – 21:17	4–0
	4–1	33:03 – C. Shields (R. Dowd, C. Peacock)
T. Hundertpfund (R. Herburger) – 34:38	5–1
	5–2	38:23 – C. Shields (R. Dowd, D. Mayers)
M. Latusa (T. Raffl, G. Baumgartner) (PP) – 43:34	6–2
	6–3	50:27 – C. Neilson (C. Shields, D. Clarke) (PP)
R. Herburger (S. Geier) – 52:56	7–3

10 min
Penalties
16 min
28
Shots
34

16 April 2012; 20:00	Slovenia	4–2 (1–0, 1–1, 2–1)	Japan	Arena Stožice, Ljubljana; Attendance: 8,070

Game reference

Andrej Hocevar
Goalies
Masahito Haruna
Referee:
(Latvia) Eduards Odins
Linesmen:
(Czech Republic) Rudolf Tosenovjan
(Canada) Matt Traub

M. Robar (Ž. Jeglič, R. Tičar) – 11:03	1–0
D. Rodman (A. Kranjc) (PP) – 27:24	2–0
	2–1	34:57 – R. Tanaka (H. Terao)
	2–2	47:23 – T. Yamashita
A. Kranjc (PP) – 58:40	3–2
T. Razingar (D. Rodman) (ENG) – 59:49	4–2

14 min
Penalties
18 min
33
Shots
23

18 April 2012; 13:00	Ukraine	3–4 OT (1–0, 2–3, 0–0) (OT: 0–1)	Great Britain	Arena Stožice, Ljubljana; Attendance: 360

Game reference

Mykhailo Balaban
Goalies
Stephen Murphy
Referee:
(Latvia) Eduards Odins
Linesmen:
(Slovenia) Matjaz Hribar
(Canada) Matt Traub

O. Pobyedonostsev (O. Yakovenko, D. Zablukovsky) – 13:29	1–0
	1–1	23:05 – R. Dowd (PS)
	1–2	30:46 – M. Myers (SH)
	1–3	32:53 – R. Dowd (C. Shields, C. Neilson)
S. Klymentyev (Y. Navarenko) (PP) – 35:07	2–3
O. Pobyedonostsev (O. Tymchenko, V. Lyutkevych – 35:51	3–3
	3–4	61:46 – R. Dowd (M. Myers)

6 min
Penalties
12 min
38
Shots
23

18 April 2012; 16:30	Austria	3–4 GWS (1–0, 1–2, 1–1) (OT: 0–0) (SO: 0–1)	Japan	Arena Stožice, Ljubljana; Attendance: 640

Game reference

Bernhard Starkbaum
Goalies
Yuta Narisawa
Referee:
(Slovakia) Jozef Kubus
Linesmen:
(Slovenia) Damir Rakovic
(Czech Republic) Rudolf Tosenovjan

M. Altmann (P. Harand, M. Latusa) – 11:52	1–0
	1–1	25:25 – S. Kuji (J. Tonosaki, G. Tanaka) (PP)
S. Ulmer (R. Herburger, M. Geier) – 29:13	2–1
	2–2	36:47 – S. Kuji (A. Keller, J. Tonosaki)
M. Trattnig (T. Koch, D. Welser) (PP2) – 47:20	3–2
	3–3	48:33 – S. Kuji

G. Baumgartner (miss)
M. Grabner
T. Koch (miss)
Shootout
(miss) H. Ueno
H. Terao
G. Tanaka
8 min
Penalties
4 min
38
Shots
27

18 April 2012; 20:00	Slovenia	4–1 (1–0, 2–0, 1–1)	Hungary	Arena Stožice, Ljubljana; Attendance: 9,563

Game reference

Robert Kristan
Goalies
Bence Bálizs
Referee:
(Russia) Alexei Ravodin
Linesmen:
(Switzerland) Roman Kaderli
(Netherlands) Joep Leermakers

R. Sabolič (B. Gregorc) – 02:55	1–0
B. Gregorc (M. Robar) (PP2) – 26:13	2–0
D. Rodman (S. Kovačevič, A. Kranjc) – 27:09	3–0
R. Tičar (M. Robar, B. Gregorc) (PP) – 47:27	4–0
	4–1	50:25 – M. Vas (B. Ladanyi, I. Sofron) (PP)

26 min
Penalties
36 min
29
Shots
25

19 April 2012; 13:00	Great Britain	0–5 (0–2, 0–2, 0–1)	Japan	Arena Stožice, Ljubljana; Attendance: 680

Game reference

Stephen Murphy
Goalies
Masahito Haruna
Referee:
(Russia) Alexei Ravodin
Linesmen:
(Switzerland) Roman Kaderli
(Slovenia) Damir Rakovic

0–1	09:10 – H. Ueno (S. Kuji, G. Tanaka) (PP)
0–2	13:02 – H. Ueno
0–3	31:34 – H. Kawashima (T. Ishizuka, K. Mitamura)
0–4	33:48 – S. Yanadori (T. Yamashita, J. Tonosaki)
0–5	48:50 – K. Mitamura (T. Yamashita)

16 min
Penalties
14 min
30
Shots
25

19 April 2012; 16:30	Hungary	2–7 (2–1, 0–2, 0–4)	Austria	Arena Stožice, Ljubljana; Attendance: 4,250

Game reference

Bence Bálizs
Goalies
Bernhard Starkbaum
Referee:
(Latvia) Eduards Odins
Linesmen:
(Slovenia) Matjaz Hribar
(Canada) Matt Traub

N. Galanisz (B. Magosi, I. Bartalis) – 04:50	1–0
	1–1	06:27 – S. Geier (J. Kirisits, J. Reichel)
M. Vas (B. Ladanyi) (PP) – 10:47	2–1
	2–2	22:58 – G. Unterluggauer (PP2)
	2–3	38:49 – M. Latusa (M. Grabner)
	2–4	43:26 – P. Harand (D. Oberkofler)
	2–5	51:58 – G. Unterluggauer (M. Grabner)
	2–6	53:38 – M. Latusa (G. Baumgartner, M. Trattnig) (PP)
	2–7	55:36 – G. Baumgartner (M. Trattnig, T. Hundertpfund)

22 min
Penalties
20 min
20
Shots
40

19 April 2012; 20:00	Slovenia	3–2 (0–1, 2–1, 1–0)	Ukraine	Arena Stožice, Ljubljana; Attendance: 9,450

Game reference

Robert Kristan
Goalies
Igor Karpenko
Referee:
(Finland) Aleksi Rantala
Linesmen:
(United States) Paul Carnathan
(Czech Republic) Rudolf Tosenovjan

	0–1	12:45 – A. Mikhnov (S. Klymentyyev, S. Ramazanov) (EA)
R. Sabolič (R. Tičar, Ž. Jeglič) – 21:53	1–1
	1–2	24:25 – O. Shafarenko (V. Lyutkevych, O. Tymchenko) (PP2)
R. Tičar (M. Robar) – 29:13	2–2
R. Tičar (R. Sabolič, B. Gregorc) (PP) – 44:25	3–2

14 min
Penalties
12 min
18
Shots
31

21 April 2012; 13:00	Japan	1–2 GWS (0–1, 0–0, 1–0) (OT: 0–0) (SO: 0–1)	Ukraine	Arena Stožice, Ljubljana; Attendance: 640

Game reference
Yuta Narisawa	Goalies	Igor Karpenko	Referee: (Finland) Aleksi Rantala; Linesmen: (Slovenia) Matjaz Hribar (Netherlands) Joep Leermakers
/ 0–1 / 08:48 – Y. Navarenko (O. Materukhin, O. Shafarenko); R. Tanaka (H. Terao, M. Suzuki) – 47:16 / 1–1			Referee: (Finland) Aleksi Rantala; Linesmen: (Slovenia) Matjaz Hribar (Netherlands) Joep Leermakers
S. Kuji; H. Terao (miss); G. Tanaka (miss); S. Kuji (miss); G. Tanaka (miss)	Shootout	(miss) O. Tymchenko; (miss) A. Bondaryev; K. Kasianchuk; (miss) K. Kasianchuk; A. Bondaryev	Referee: (Finland) Aleksi Rantala; Linesmen: (Slovenia) Matjaz Hribar (Netherlands) Joep Leermakers
12 min	Penalties	8 min	Referee: (Finland) Aleksi Rantala; Linesmen: (Slovenia) Matjaz Hribar (Netherlands) Joep Leermakers
21	Shots	24	Referee: (Finland) Aleksi Rantala; Linesmen: (Slovenia) Matjaz Hribar (Netherlands) Joep Leermakers

21 April 2012; 16:30	Hungary	4–5 (2–2, 2–2, 0–1)	Great Britain	Arena Stožice, Ljubljana; Attendance: 2,460

Game reference

Krisztián Budai
Goalies
Stephen Murphy
Referee:
(Latvia) Eduards Odins
Linesmen:
(Slovenia) Damir Rakovic
(Czech Republic) Rudolf Tosenovjan

	0–1	01:53 – J. Phillips (R. Lachowicz, M. Richardson)
M. Vas (B. Ladanyi, I. Sofron) – 03:05	1–1
C. Kovács (I. Sofron) – 06:54	2–1
	2–2	17:43 – R. Dowd (D. Phillips, C. Shields) (PP)
I. Sofron (PS) – 21:40	3–2
	3–3	34:02 – O. Fussey (C. Shields, D. Meyers) (PP)
A. Mihaly (B. Láda, M. Vas) – 36:25	4–3
	4–4	39:44 – D. Clarke (M. Richardson, R. Dowd)
	4–5	48:29 – R. Dowd (PS)

12 min
Penalties
33 min
23
Shots
30

21 April 2012; 20:00	Austria	2–3 (0–0, 2–3, 0–0)	Slovenia	Arena Stožice, Ljubljana; Attendance: 10,500

Game reference

Fabian Weinhandl
Goalies
Robert Kristan
Referee:
(Russia) Alexei Ravodin
Linesmen:
(United States) Paul Carnathan
(Canada) Matt Traub

	0–1	24:07 – A. Hebar (R. Pajič)
G. Unterluggauer (G. Baumgartner, M. Schumnig) – 25:46	1–1
	1–2	26:08 – M. Rodman (A. Music, D. Rodman)
T. Raffl (T. Hundertpfund) (PP) – 28:09	2–2
	2–3	37:10 – A. Kranjc (D. Rodman)

6 min
Penalties
22 min
25
Shots
28

=== Statistics ===
==== Top 10 scorers ====
Pos	Player	Country	GP	G	A	Pts	PIM	+/−
1	Robert Dowd	Great Britain	5	5	4	9	6	0
2	Manuel Latusa	Austria	5	5	2	7	2	+1
3	Colin Shields	Great Britain	5	3	4	7	0	−2
4	Gregor Baumgartner	Austria	5	3	3	6	2	+4
4	Rok Ticar	Slovenia	5	3	3	6	4	+4
6	Olexander Pobyedonostsev	Ukraine	5	4	1	5	0	−1
7	David Rodman	Slovenia	5	3	2	5	10	+1
7	Oleg Tymchenko	Ukraine	5	3	2	5	2	+2
7	Marton Vas	Hungary	5	3	2	5	0	−2
10	Raphael Herburger	Austria	5	1	4	5	2	+3

IIHF.com

==== Goaltending leaders ====
(minimum 40% team's total ice time)

Pos	Player	Country	MINS	GA	Sv%	GAA	SO
1	Robert Kristan	Slovenia	240:00	7	93.20	1.75	0
2	Masahito Haruna	Japan	159:31	7	91.57	2.63	1
3	Yuta Narisawa	Japan	150:00	6	90.91	2.40	0
4	Bence Balizs	Hungary	240:00	13	90.71	3.25	0
5	Mykhailo Balaban	Ukraine	157:40	7	88.33	2.66	0

IIHF.com

=== Tournament awards ===
- Best players selected by the directorate:
  - Best Goalkeeper: (Slovenia) Robert Kristan
  - Best Defenseman: (Austria) Matthias Trattnig
  - Best Forward: (Austria) Manuel Latusa

IIHF.com

== Group B Tournament ==
=== Standings ===
Promoted to Division I A for 2013
Relegated to Division II A for 2013

Team	GP	W	OTW	OTL	L	GF	GA	GDF	PTS
South Korea	5	4	1	0	0	24	10	+14	14
Poland	5	4	0	0	1	31	7	+24	12
Netherlands	5	3	0	1	1	21	13	+8	10
Romania	5	2	0	0	3	13	28	−15	6
Lithuania	5	1	0	0	4	9	27	−18	3
Australia	5	0	0	0	5	14	27	−13	0

All times are local (UTC+2).

15 April 2012; 13:00	Australia	4–8 (3–3, 1–1, 0–4)	South Korea	Krynica Ice Stadium, Krynica; Attendance: 450

Game reference

Anthony Kimlin
Goalies
Eum Hyun-seung
Referee:
(Germany) Stephan Bauer
Linesmen:
(Slovakia) Tomas Orolin
(Poland) Mariusz Smura

	0–1	03:37 – Kim H. (Lee Y., Kim G.) (PP)
	0–2	05:01 – Lee Y. (Kim K., Lee D.)
T. Powell (J. Hughes) – 10:10	1–2
T. Powell (J. Hughes, L. Webster) – 15:05	2–2
	2–3	19:00 – Kim W. (SH)
J. Harding (A. White) (PP2) – 19:23	3–3
L. Webster (T. Powell) (PP) – 24:43	4–3
	4–4	32:29 – Lee Y. (Lee D.)
	4–5	44:05 – Park W. (Lee Y., Kim D.)
	4–6	55:47 – Kim K. (Park W.)
	4–7	57:18 – Kim G. (Kim S., Sin S.)
	4–8	59:58 – Kim S. (Kim G., Sin S.)

8 min
Penalties
18 min
28
Shots
39

15 April 2012; 16:30	Romania	1–4 (0–0, 1–3, 0–1)	Netherlands	Krynica Ice Stadium, Krynica; Attendance: 250

Game reference

Adrian Cornea-Catrinoi
Goalies
Ian Meierdres
Referee:
(Czech Republic) Pavel Hodek
Linesmen:
(United Kingdom) Andrew Dalton
(Latvia) Raivis Jucers

R. Gliga (T. Becze) – 27:53	1–0
	1–1	34:21 – I. van den Heuvel (L. van Sloun) (PP2)
	1–2	35:23 – D. Hagemeijer (J. van Oorschot, B. Willemse) (PP)
	1–3	38:31 – D. Hagemeijer (K. Bruijsten, N. de Jong)
	1–4	56:55 – M. Kars (L. Houkes, L. van Slound)

14 min
Penalties
14 min
24
Shots
25

15 April 2012; 20:00	Lithuania	0–9 (0–2, 0–4, 0–3)	Poland	Krynica Ice Stadium, Krynica; Attendance: 3,000

Game reference

Nerijus Dauksevicius
Goalies
Przemyslaw Odrobny
Referee:
(Switzerland) Daniel Stricker
Linesmen:
(Finland) Jani Pesonen
(Croatia) Trpimir Piragic

0–1	10:11 – P. Sarnik (T. Malasinski, P. Wajda) (PP)
0–2	11:55 – K. Dziubinski (J. Witecki, T. Malasinski)
0–3	20:31 – L. Laszkiewicz (D. Slabon, P. Sarnik)
0–4	24:42 – M. Kolusz (K. Zapala)
0–5	33:15 – M. Csorich (G. Pasiut, J. Rzeszutko)
0–6	39:13 – M. Lopuski (M. Kolusz, P. Dronia)
0–7	46:44 – G. Pasiut
0–8	47:27 – K. Dziubinski (M. Csorich, P. Wajda)
0–9	55:53 – P. Dawel (D. Kapica) (PP2)

14 min
Penalties
4 min
9
Shots
41

16 April 2012; 13:00	Netherlands	6–2 (1–1, 3–1, 2–0)	Australia	Krynica Ice Stadium, Krynica; Attendance: 150

Game reference

Ian Meierdres
Goalies
Olivier Martin
Referee:
(Switzerland) Daniel Stricker
Linesmen:
(Croatia) Trpimir Piragic
(Poland) Mariusz Smura

	0–1	00:37 – N. Walker
K. Bruijsten (M. Bruijsten) – 18:04	1–1
M. Dalhuisen (M. Postma, A. Demelinne) – 26:56	2–1
M. Kars (L. van Sloun) (PP) – 28:29	3–1
M. Postma (M. Kars, L. Houkes) (PP) – 34:28	4–1
	4–2	37:53 – L. Webster (J. Hughes)
D. Hagemeijer (M. Dalhuisen) (PP) – 47:57	5–2
K. Bruijsten (D. Hagemeijer, J. van Oorschot) (PP) – 51:45	6–2

8 min
Penalties
71 min
49
Shots
22

16 April 2012; 16:30	South Korea	3–0 (3–0, 0–0, 0–0)	Lithuania	Krynica Ice Stadium, Krynica; Attendance: 100

Game reference

Eum Hyun-seung
Park Sung-je
Goalies
Mantas Armalis
Referee:
(Canada) Matt Kirk
Linesmen:
(Japan) Kenji Kosaka
(Slovakia) Tomas Orolin

Kim G. (Sin S., Kim S.) – 12:52	1–0
Kim W. (Kim Y., Lee Y.) – 17:23	2–0
Park W. (Kim K.) – 19:47	3–0

10 min
Penalties
14 min
40
Shots
13

16 April 2012; 20:00	Poland	10–0 (3–0, 3–0, 4–0)	Romania	Krynica Ice Stadium, Krynica; Attendance: 1,500

Game reference

Przemyslaw Odrobny
Goalies
Gellert Ruczuj
Adrian Catrinoi Cornea
Referee:
(Germany) Stephan Bauer
Linesmen:
(United Kingdom) Andrew Dalton
(Finland) Jani Pesonen

M. Lopuski (K. Zalapa, M. Kolusz) – 01:07	1–0
K. Zalapa (M. Kolusz, P. Dronia) – 16:15	2–0
D. Slabon (L. Lasziewicz, A. Borzecki) (PP) – 19:49	3–0
M. Lopuski (A. Borzecki, M. Kolusz) (PP) – 26:40	4–0
L. Lasziewicz (A. Borzecki, D. Slabon) – 32:17	5–0
D. Slabon (L. Lasziewicz, P. Wajda) (PP) – 38:59	6–0
J. Rzeszutko (G. Pasiut, A. Borzecki) – 47:01	7–0
L. Lasziewicz (D. Slabon) (PP) – 47:52	8–0
K. Dziubinski (M. Csorich, P. Wajda) – 52:55	9–0
K. Dziubinski (M. Kolusz, A. Borzecki) (PP) – 58:58	10–0

12 min
Penalties
18 min
42
Shots
19

18 April 2012; 13:00	South Korea	6–1 (3–0, 1–0, 2–1)	Romania	Krynica Ice Stadium, Krynica; Attendance: 150

Game reference

Eum Hyun-seun
Goalies
Gellert Ruczuj
Adrian Catrinoi Cornea
Referee:
(Germany) Stephan Bauer
Linesmen:
(Latvia) Raivis Jucers
(Slovakia) Tomas Orolin

Lee Yo. (Kim W., Kim S.) (PP) – 11:16	1–0
Ahn H. (Jung B., Oh H.) – 13:04	2–0
Kim H. (Jung B., Ahn H.) – 16:02	3–0
Lee Yu. (Lee D.) (PP) – 29:21	4–0
Kim H. (Kim W.) (SH) – 45:34	5–0
Lee Yu. (Park W., Kim D.) – 55:38	6–0
	6–1	59:56 – Z. Molnar (C. Virag, Z. Antal) (PP)

16 min
Penalties
33 min
29
Shots
22

18 April 2012; 16:30	Australia	2–3 (0–2, 2–1, 0–0)	Lithuania	Krynica Ice Stadium, Krynica; Attendance: 170

Game reference

Anthony Kimlin
Goalies
Mantas Armalis
Referee:
(Czech Republic) Pavel Hodek
Linesmen:
(Finland) Jani Pesonen
(Croatia) Trpimir Piragic

	0–1	04:49 – P. Rulevičius (D. Bogdziul)
	0–2	08:52 – N. Ališauskas (D. Pliskauskas, M. Kieras)
M. Schlamp (A. White) – 23:30	1–2
	1–3	28:38 – N. Ališauskas (M. Kieras, D. Kulevičius) (PP)
T. Graham (G. Oddy) (PP) – 39:59	2–3

12 min
Penalties
12 min
29
Shots
33

18 April 2012; 20:00	Poland	5–1 (2–0, 1–0, 2–1)	Netherlands	Krynica Ice Stadium, Krynica; Attendance: 1,900

Game reference

Przemyslaw Odrobny
Goalies
Ian Meierdres
Referee:
(Canada) Matt Kirk
Linesmen:
(United Kingdom) Andrew Dalton
(Japan) Kenji Kosaka

L. Laszkiewicz (P. Sarnik, J. Gabrys) – 08:01	1–0
M. Kolusz (M. Lopuski, M. Rompkowski) – 08:18	2–0
M. Lopuski (SH) – 30:12	3–0
M. Kolusz (K. Zapala, J. Gabrys) (SH) – 48:08	4–0
	4–1	53:41 – M. Dalhuisen (D. Hagemeijer, K. Bruijsten) (PP)
J. Rzeszutko (J. Witecki, M. Urbanowcz) – 55:42	5–1

16 min
Penalties
10 min
37
Shots
19

19 April 2012; 13:00	Lithuania	5–6 (3–1, 1–2, 1–3)	Romania	Krynica Ice Stadium, Krynica; Attendance: 140

Game reference

Mantas Armalis
Goalies
Adrian Catrinoi Cornea
Referee:
(Canada) Matt Kirk
Linesmen:
(Japan) Kenji Kosaka
(Croatia) Trpimir Piragic

	0–1	06:12 – A. Góga (Z. Molnár, C. Virág)
N. Ališauskas (A. Bendzius) (PP) – 11:50	1–1
A. Bendzius (D. Pliskauskas, D. Kulevičius) – 12:51	2–1
M. Kieras (D. Pliskauskas, D. Bogdziul) – 17:23	3–1
	3–2	25:57 – Y. Pysarenko (E. Moldovan, L. Zsók) (SH)
	3–3	33:25 – O. Biro (S. Papp, I. Nagy)
D. Pliskauskas (N. Ališauskas) – 39:41	4–3
D. Pliskauskas (A. Katulis) – 41:03	5–3
	5–4	56:14 – E. Mihály (Z. Molnár, A. Góga) (PP)
	5–5	56:28 – I. Nagy (E. Moldovan, O. Biro)
	5–6	58:13 – I. Nagy (O. Biro, E. Moldovan)

8 min
Penalties
10 min
33
Shots
42

19 April 2012; 16:30	Netherlands	3–4 OT (1–2, 0–1, 2–0) (OT: 0–1)	South Korea	Krynica Ice Stadium, Krynica; Attendance: 85

Game reference

Ian Meierdres
Goalies
Eum Hyun-seung
Referee:
(Switzerland) Daniel Stricker
Linesmen:
(United Kingdom) Andrew Dalton
(Poland) Mariusz Smura

M. Bruijsten (D. Hagemeijer, K. Bruijsten) (PP) – 05:09	1–0
	1–1	13:48 – Lee Y. (Kim W.) (SH)
	1–2	19:19 – Kim K. (Lee Y., Kim D.)
	1–3	32:47 – Kim G. (Oh H.)
A. Demelinne (J-J. Natte, M. Postma) (PP) – 43:30	2–3
A. Demelinne (M. Postma, I. van den Heuvel) (PP) – 51:03	3–3
	3–4	63:39 – Kim W. (Sin S.)

10 min
Penalties
10 min
29
Shots
36

19 April 2012; 20:00	Poland	5–3 (1–0, 3–2, 1–1)	Australia	Krynica Ice Stadium, Krynica; Attendance: 2,000

Game reference

Kamil Kosowski
Goalies
Anthony Kimlin
Referee:
(Czech Republic) Pavel Hodek
Linesmen:
(Latvia) Raivis Jucers
(Finland) Jani Pesonen

J. Rzeszutko (M. Kolusz) – 14:33	1–0
	1–1	20:27 – N. Walker
J. Witecki (M. Urbanowicz) – 35:18	2–1
M. Kolusz (M. Csorich) – 37:49	3–1
P. Dronia (M. Urbanowicz) – 38:44	4–1
	4–2	38:59 – S. Stephenson (G. Hyde)
D. Slabon (L. Laszkiewicz) – 44:23	5–2
	5–3	59:42 – T. Stephenson (J. Seymour)

14 min
Penalties
14 min
45
Shots
22

21 April 2012; 13:00	Netherlands	7–1 (2–0, 1–1, 4–0)	Lithuania	Krynica Ice Stadium, Krynica; Attendance: 70

Game reference

Ian Meierdres
Goalies
Mantas Armalis
Referee:
(Czech Republic) Pavel Hodek
Linesmen:
(Latvia) Raivis Jucers
(Poland) Mariusz Smura

J-J. Natte (A. Demelinne) – 16:39	1–0
D. Hagemeijer (M. Bruijsten) – 18:23	2–0
	2–1	27:22 – D. Bogdziul (P. Nauseda) (PP)
A. Demelinne (M. Postma) – 32:22	3–1
D. Hagemeijer (M. Dalhuisen, K. Bruijsten) (PP) – 44:01	4–1
L. Houkes (M. Kars) – 44:59	5–1
M. Postma (M. Dalhuisen, B. Willemse) (PP) – 46:50	6–1
I. van den Heuvel (M. Kars) (SH) – 52:02	7–1

16 min
Penalties
32 min
34
Shots
31

21 April 2012; 16:30	Romania	5–3 (2–2, 1–0, 2–1)	Australia	Krynica Ice Stadium, Krynica; Attendance: 250

Game reference

Adrian Catrinoi Cornea
Goalies
Anthony Kimlin
Referee:
(Germany) Stephan Bauer
Linesmen:
(Japan) Kenji Kosaka
(Slovakia) Tomas Orolin

S. Szőcs (A. Góga) – 01:54	1–0
	1–1	09:25 – S. Stephenson (G. Oddy, M. Schlamp)
S. Szőcs (L. Zsók, Z. Antal) – 13:32	2–1
	2–2	18:35 – T. Stephenson (L. Webster, J. Harding)
Y. Pysarenko (E. Mihály, A. Góga) – 38:22	3–2
L. Zsók (Z. Antal, S. Szőcs) – 51:25	4–2
	4–3	51:45 – S. Stephenson (G. Oddy, M. Schlamp)
A. Góga (C. Virág) – 52:00	5–3

20 min
Penalties
6 min
28
Shots
25

21 April 2012; 20:00	South Korea	3–2 (1–2, 1–0, 1–0)	Poland	Krynica Ice Stadium, Krynica; Attendance: 3,200

Game reference

Eum Hyun-seung
Goalies
Przemyslaw Odrobny
Referee:
(Canada) Matt Kirk
Linesmen:
(United Kingdom) Andrew Dalton
(Finland) Jani Pesonen

	0–1	07:23 – J. Gabrys (L. Laszkiewicz)
	0–2	13:08 – P. Sarnik (L. Laszkiewicz, P. Wajda) (PP)
Kim W. (Kim H., Sin S.) – 17:42	1–2
Sin S. (Lee Y, Oh H.) – 25:52	2–2
Kim H. (Lee S., Kim W.) – 51:39	3–2

10 min
Penalties
12 min
22
Shots
34

=== Statistics ===
==== Top 10 scorers ====
Pos	Player	Country	GP	G	A	Pts	PIM	+/−
1	Marcin Kolusz	Poland	5	4	6	10	0	+8
2	Leszek Laszkiewicz	Poland	5	4	5	9	2	+3
3	Diederick Hagemeijer	Netherlands	5	5	3	8	6	−2
4	Kim Won-jung	South Korea	5	4	3	7	0	+6
5	Lee Yongjun	South Korea	5	3	3	6	2	+2
5	Damian Slabon	Poland	5	3	3	6	0	+3
7	Kevin Bruijsten	Netherlands	5	2	4	6	2	−2
7	Marco Postma	Netherlands	5	2	4	6	8	−1
9	Sin Sangwoo	South Korea	5	1	5	6	2	+8
10	Mikolaj Lopuski	Poland	5	4	1	5	2	+7

IIHF.com

==== Goaltending leaders ====
(minimum 40% team's total ice time)

Pos	Player	Country	MINS	GA	Sv%	GAA	SO
1	Przemyslaw Odrobny	Poland	239:10	4	94.20	1.00	2
2	Eum Hyunseung	South Korea	255:03	9	91.89	2.12	0
3	Ian Meierdres	Netherlands	303:39	13	91:33	2.57	0
4	Mantas Armalis	Lithuania	239:20	18	87.59	4.51	0
5	Anthony Kimlin	Australia	239:36	21	85.52	5.26	0

IIHF.com

=== Tournament awards ===
- Best players selected by the directorate:
  - Best Goalkeeper: (Netherlands) Ian Meierdres
  - Best Defenseman: (Poland) Adam Borzecki
  - Best Forward: (Poland) Marcin Kolusz

IIHF.com
