= Matthias Trattnig =

Austrian ice hockey player

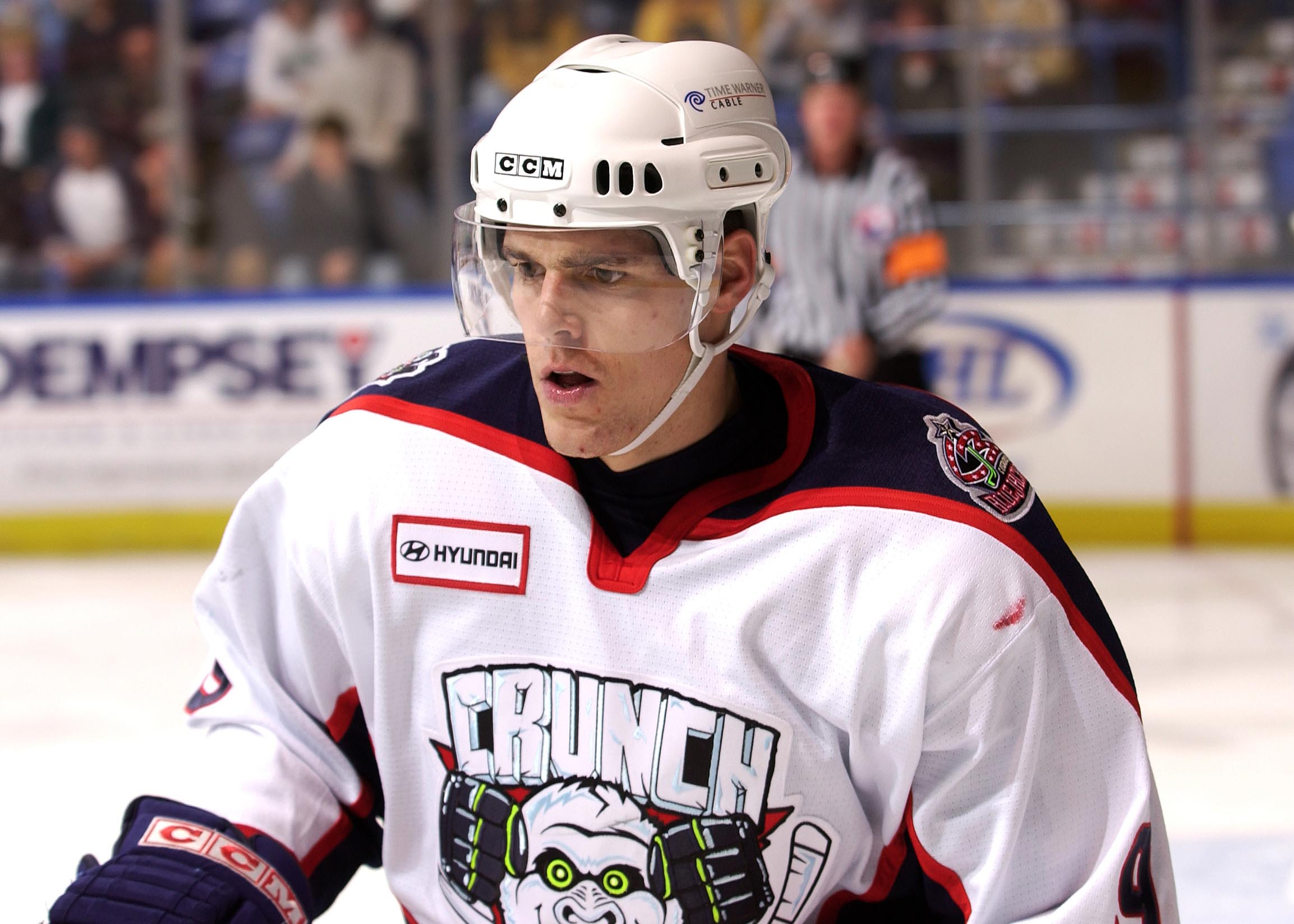
- Trattnig with the Syracuse Crunch in 2004
- Born: April 22, 1979 (age 47) Graz, Austria
- Height: 6 ft 1 in (185 cm)
- Weight: 212 lb (96 kg; 15 st 2 lb)
- Position: Defence
- Shot: Left
- Played for: EC Graz; Djurgårdens IF; EC Kassel Huskies; Syracuse Crunch; EC Red Bull Salzburg
- National team: Austria
- NHL draft: 94th overall, 1998; Chicago Blackhawks
- Playing career: 1995–2019

Matthias Trattnig (born April 22, 1979) is an Austrian former professional ice hockey defenceman. He was selected by the Chicago Blackhawks in the 4th round (94th overall) of the 1998 NHL entry draft and was a leader at the University of Maine. Trattnig most notably played as the longtime Captain of EC Red Bull Salzburg of the Austrian Hockey League.

Following his 14th season with EC Red Bull Salzburg in the 2018-19 season, Trattnig ended his 24-year professional career on 15 April 2019.

He was a veteran member of the Austria men's national ice hockey team, and last participated at the 2011 IIHF World Championship. He also competed at the 2002 Winter Olympics and the 2014 Winter Olympics.

== Awards and honours ==
Award	Year
College
All-Hockey East Rookie Team	1997–98

== Career statistics ==
=== Regular season and playoffs ===
			Regular season					Playoffs
Season	Team	League	GP	G	A	Pts	PIM	GP	G	A	Pts	PIM
1995–96	EC Graz	AUT	17	0	1	1	0	—	—	—	—	—
1996–97	Capital District Selects	NYJHL	51	30	54	84	64	—	—	—	—	—
1997–98	University of Maine	HE	34	8	9	17	30	—	—	—	—	—
1998–99	University of Maine	HE	39	5	5	10	32	—	—	—	—	—
1999–2000	University of Maine	HE	39	8	11	19	26	—	—	—	—	—
2000–01	University of Maine	HE	37	11	13	24	51	—	—	—	—	—
2001–02	Djurgårdens IF	SEL	44	4	5	9	26	5	0	0	0	0
2002–03	Djurgårdens IF	SEL	48	7	5	12	67	12	3	2	5	16
2003–04	Kassel Huskies	DEL	52	12	19	31	72	—	—	—	—	—
2004–05	Syracuse Crunch	AHL	68	7	11	18	68	—	—	—	—	—
2005–06	EC Red Bull Salzburg	AUT	47	14	40	54	125	11	3	5	8	20
2006–07	EC Red Bull Salzburg	AUT	55	28	38	66	90	6	3	5	8	20
2007–08	EC Red Bull Salzburg	AUT	38	14	18	32	81	14	5	6	11	18
2008–09	EC Red Bull Salzburg	AUT	45	23	28	51	111	13	2	7	9	6
2009–10	EC Red Bull Salzburg	AUT	50	9	28	37	92	8	1	1	2	20
2010–11	EC Red Bull Salzburg	AUT	47	14	30	44	94	16	5	7	12	35
2011–12	EC Red Bull Salzburg	AUT	47	9	21	30	56	6	1	2	3	20
2012–13	EC Red Bull Salzburg	AUT	43	9	17	26	60	12	4	3	7	6
2013–14	EC Red Bull Salzburg	AUT	20	1	11	12	45	14	2	3	5	16
2014–15	EC Red Bull Salzburg	AUT	51	11	16	27	77	9	2	4	6	11
2015–16	EC Red Bull Salzburg	AUT	40	9	15	24	73	19	5	4	9	12
2016–17	EC Red Bull Salzburg	AUT	48	11	19	30	42	10	2	2	4	6
2017–18	EC Red Bull Salzburg	AUT	33	2	8	10	32	17	3	2	5	16
2018–19	EC Red Bull Salzburg	AUT	36	4	6	10	34	13	2	2	4	14
AUT totals			617	158	296	454	1012	168	40	53	93	220
SEL totals			92	11	10	21	93	17	3	2	5	16

=== International ===
Year	Team	Event	GP	G	A	Pts	PIM
1996	Austria	WJC B	5	2	0	2	0
1996	Austria	EJC C	4	0	2	2	10
1999	Austria	WC	6	2	0	2	4
2000	Austria	WC	6	1	1	2	6
2001	Austria	OGQ	3	0	0	0	0
2001	Austria	WC	6	0	1	1	10
2002	Austria	OG	4	1	1	2	2
2002	Austria	WC	6	1	1	2	12
2003	Austria	WC	6	0	1	1	6
2004	Austria	WC	6	2	2	4	2
2005	Austria	OGQ	3	0	0	0	0
2005	Austria	WC	6	0	2	2	4
2006	Austria	WC D1	5	4	3	7	8
2007	Austria	WC	6	0	1	1	12
2008	Austria	WC D1	5	0	2	2	0
2009	Austria	OGQ	3	0	0	0	2
2009	Austria	WC	6	0	1	1	2
2010	Austria	WC D1	5	3	6	9	4
2011	Austria	WC	6	0	1	1	10
2012	Austria	WC D1A	5	2	2	4	10
2013	Austria	OGQ	3	1	1	2	0
2014	Austria	OG	4	0	1	1	2
Junior totals			9	2	2	4	10
Senior totals			100	17	27	44	96
