= Daniel Welser =

Austrian ice hockey player

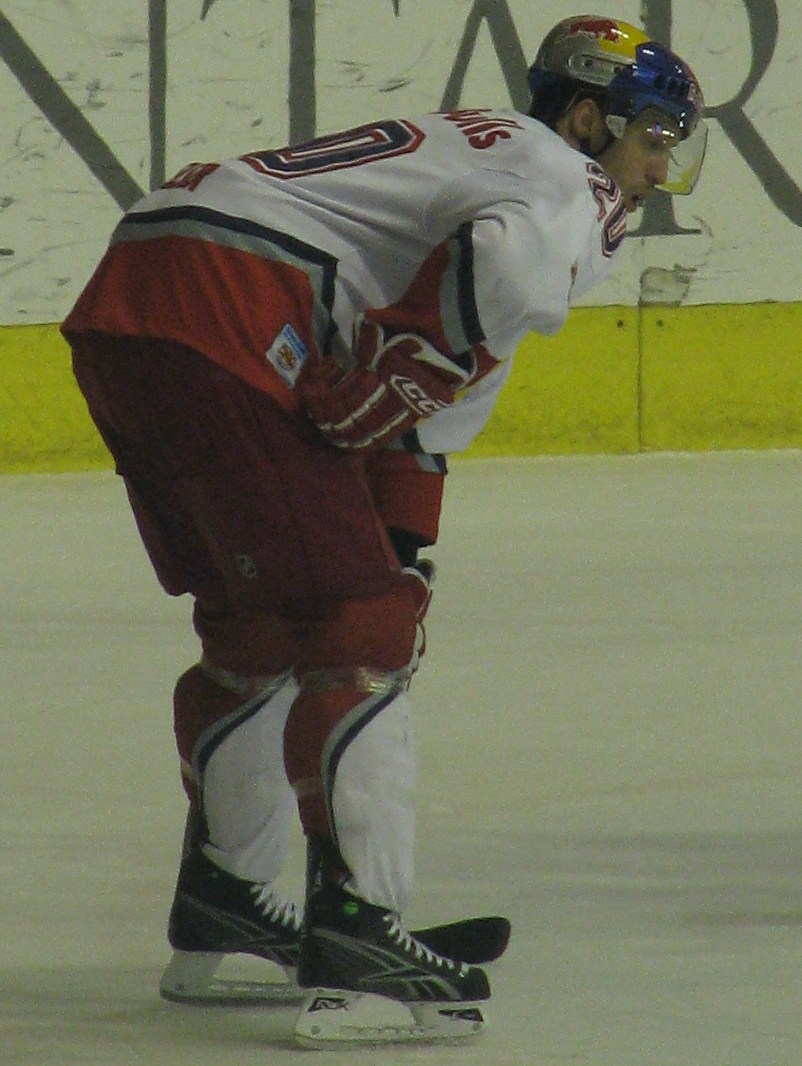
- Born: February 16, 1983 (age 42); Klagenfurt am Wörthersee, Austria
- Height: 5 ft 10 in (178 cm)
- Weight: 179 lb (81 kg; 12 st 11 lb)
- Position: Forward
- Shot: Left
- EBEL team Former teams: EC Red Bull Salzburg; EC KAC; Skellefteå AIK
- National team: Austria
- NHL draft: Undrafted
- Playing career: 2000–2017

Daniel Welser (born February 16, 1983, in Klagenfurt am Wörthersee, Austria) is an Austrian professional ice hockey player who retired with the EC Red Bull Salzburg of the Austrian Hockey League (EBEL) and also got his number retired. He participated at the 2011 IIHF World Championship as a member of the Austria men's national ice hockey team.

== Career statistics ==
=== Regular season and playoffs ===
			Regular season					Playoffs
Season	Team	League	GP	G	A	Pts	PIM	GP	G	A	Pts	PIM
1999–2000	EC KAC	IEHL	2	0	0	0	0	—	—	—	—	—
1999–2000	Team Kärnten 2006	AUT.2	11	6	2	8	12	—	—	—	—	—
2000–01	EC KAC	AUT	48	10	16	26	103	—	—	—	—	—
2001–02	EC KAC	AUT U20	1	0	1	1	0	—	—	—	—	—
2001–02	EC KAC	AUT	28	8	9	17	87	10	2	4	6	20
2002–03	EC KAC	AUT	41	11	11	22	125	6	0	4	4	22
2003–04	EC KAC	AUT	44	16	15	31	127	8	2	3	5	22
2004–05	EC KAC	AUT	35	8	26	34	94	12	4	4	8	49
2005–06	Skellefteå AIK	Allsv	40	17	5	22	45	10	3	4	7	0
2006–07	Skellefteå AIK	SEL	51	9	6	15	48	—	—	—	—	—
2007–08	EC Red Bull Salzburg	AUT	44	13	22	35	92	14	2	5	7	30
2008–09	EC Red Bull Salzburg	AUT	30	10	5	15	40	15	4	8	12	40
2009–10	EC Red Bull Salzburg	AUT	36	8	26	34	55	17	7	9	16	42
2010–11	EC Red Bull Salzburg	AUT	50	13	21	34	95	11	1	7	8	12
2011–12	EC Red Bull Salzburg	AUT	32	6	9	15	34	3	0	2	2	2
2012–13	EC Red Bull Salzburg	AUT	44	7	15	22	47	8	0	1	1	2
2013–14	EC Red Bull Salzburg	AUT	33	6	10	16	26	—	—	—	—	—
2014–15	EC Red Bull Salzburg	AUT	49	14	19	33	30	10	1	5	6	8
2015–16	EC Red Bull Salzburg	AUT	42	13	15	28	76	17	2	9	11	8
2016–17	EC Red Bull Salzburg	AUT	49	20	20	40	28	7	0	3	3	10
2017–18	EC Red Bull Salzburg	AUT	3	0	0	0	0	—	—	—	—	—
AUT totals			608	163	239	402	1059	138	25	64	89	267

=== International ===
Year	Team	Event	GP	G	A	Pts	PIM
2000	Austria	WJC B	4	3	2	5	2
2001	Austria	WJC D1	5	3	2	5	4
2002	Austria	WJC D1	5	0	0	0	10
2003	Austria	WJC D1	5	4	2	6	18
2003	Austria	WC	6	2	1	3	4
2004	Austria	WC	6	1	1	2	8
2005	Austria	OGQ	3	0	0	0	2
2005	Austria	WC	6	1	1	2	10
2006	Austria	WC D1	5	3	2	5	2
2007	Austria	WC	6	1	1	2	0
2008	Austria	WC D1	5	2	1	3	2
2009	Austria	OGQ	3	1	0	1	16
2010	Austria	WC D1	5	4	4	8	2
2011	Austria	WC	6	0	0	0	2
2012	Austria	WC D1A	5	1	3	4	2
2013	Austria	OGQ	3	0	1	1	0
2013	Austria	WC	6	1	1	2	27
2014	Austria	OG	3	0	1	1	2
Junior totals			19	10	6	16	34
Senior totals			68	17	17	34	79
