= Manuel Latusa =

Austrian ice hockey player

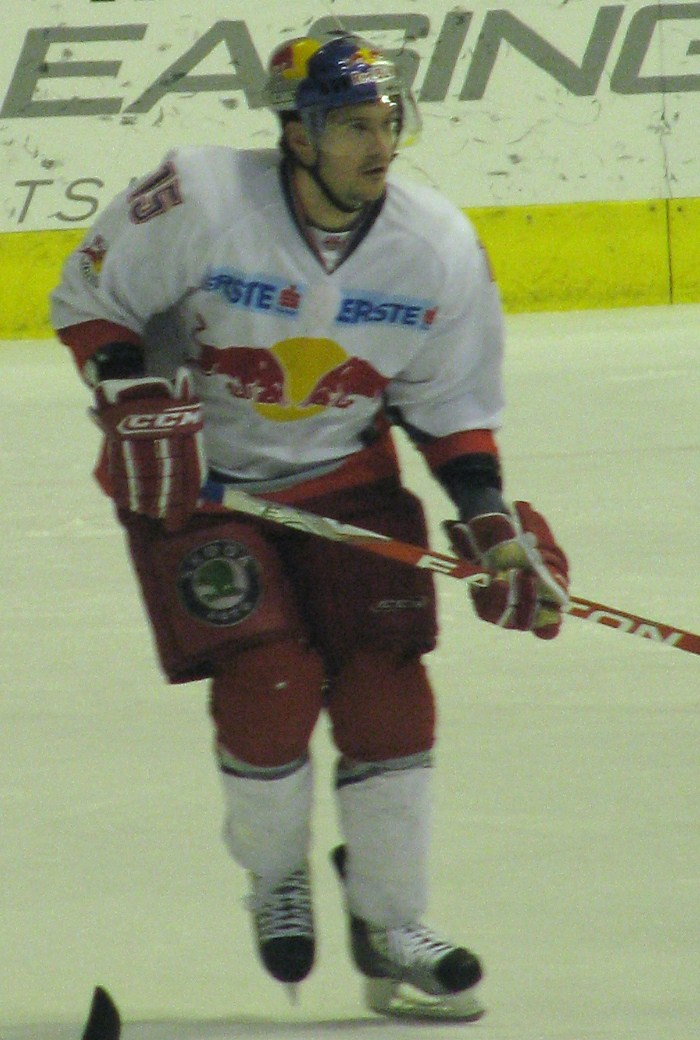
- Born: January 23, 1984 (age 41); Vienna, Austria
- Height: 6 ft 0 in (183 cm)
- Weight: 194 lb (88 kg; 13 st 12 lb)
- Position: Right wing
- Shot: Left
- EBEL team Former teams: EC Red Bull Salzburg; EC KAC; Vienna Capitals
- National team: Austria
- NHL draft: Undrafted
- Playing career: 2001–2018

Manuel Latusa (born January 23, 1984) is an Austrian professional ice hockey winger who is currently playing with EC Red Bull Salzburg of the Austrian Hockey League (EBEL). He first participated as a member of the Austrian National Team at the 2010 IIHF World Championship and has been a mainstay of the team since.

== Career statistics ==
=== Regular season and playoffs ===
			Regular season					Playoffs
Season	Team	League	GP	G	A	Pts	PIM	GP	G	A	Pts	PIM
2000–01	EC KAC	AUT	2	0	0	0	0	—	—	—	—	—
2001–02	Vienna Capitals	AUT	32	6	9	15	36	8	3	1	4	2
2002–03	Vienna Capitals	AUT	39	15	11	26	8	5	2	0	2	4
2003–04	Vienna Capitals	AUT	45	6	9	15	62	—	—	—	—	—
2004–05	Vienna Capitals	AUT	44	12	25	37	28	10	0	4	4	6
2005–06	Vienna Capitals	AUT	46	12	13	25	42	4	0	1	1	6
2006–07	Vienna Capitals	AUT	55	13	22	35	52	3	1	0	1	4
2007–08	Vienna Capitals	AUT	43	13	8	21	83	7	1	1	2	4
2008–09	EC Red Bull Salzburg	AUT	53	13	13	26	44	17	9	5	14	22
2009–10	EC Red Bull Salzburg	AUT	52	12	24	36	55	18	4	9	13	8
2010–11	EC Red Bull Salzburg	AUT	47	16	23	39	34	18	11	6	17	14
2011–12	EC Red Bull Salzburg	AUT	42	11	17	28	34	4	0	2	2	2
2012–13	EC Red Bull Salzburg	AUT	43	9	20	29	16	—	—	—	—	—
2013–14	EC Red Bull Salzburg	AUT	52	13	19	32	30	12	2	6	8	6
2014–15	EC Red Bull Salzburg	AUT	52	7	23	30	42	13	2	1	3	0
2015–16	EC Red Bull Salzburg	AUT	49	8	7	15	32	15	4	2	6	32
2016–17	EC Red Bull Salzburg	AUT	40	6	10	16	14	11	2	1	3	14
2017–18	EC Red Bull Salzburg	AUT	31	2	6	8	4	—	—	—	—	—
AUT totals			767	174	259	433	616	145	41	39	80	124

=== International ===
Year	Team	Event	GP	G	A	Pts	PIM
2001	Austria	WJC18 D1	5	0	1	1	14
2002	Austria	WJC18 D1	4	1	3	4	10
2003	Austria	WJC D1	5	3	2	5	4
2004	Austria	WJC	6	1	1	2	6
2010	Austria	WC D1	5	2	0	2	2
2011	Austria	WC	4	0	0	0	4
2012	Austria	WC D1A	5	5	2	7	2
2013	Austria	OGQ	1	0	0	0	0
2013	Austria	WC	7	1	1	2	0
2014	Austria	OG	4	0	0	0	2
2015	Austria	WC	7	0	1	1	0
Junior totals			20	5	7	12	34
Senior totals			33	8	4	12	10
