= Daniel Oberkofler =

Austrian ice hockey player

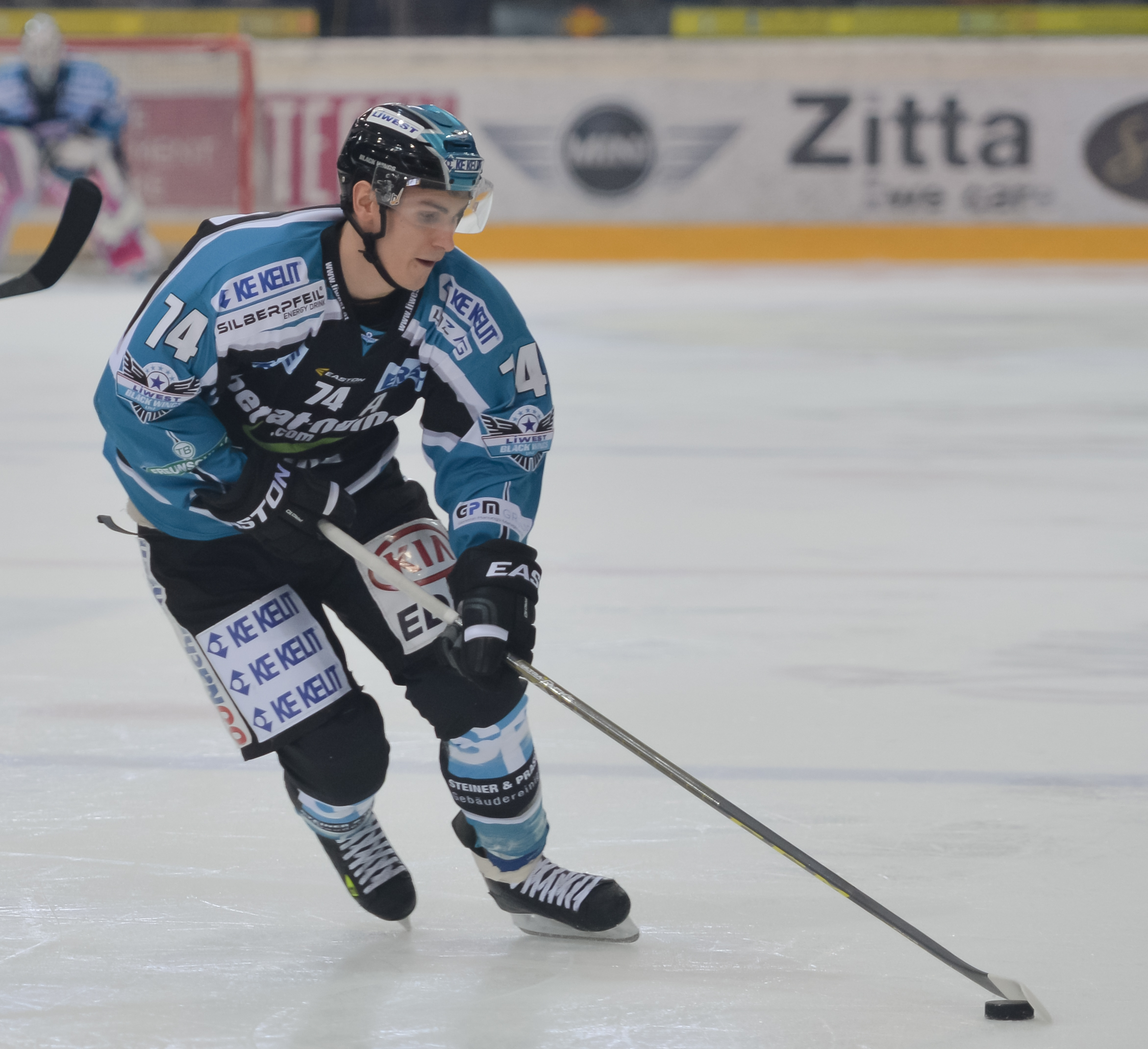
- Born: July 16, 1988 (age 37); Graz, Austria
- Height: 6 ft 0 in (183 cm)
- Weight: 163 lb (74 kg; 11 st 9 lb)
- Position: Centre
- Shoots: Left
- ICEHL team Former teams: Graz99ers; EHC Black Wings Linz
- National team: Austria
- Playing career: 2005–present

Daniel Oberkofler (born July 16, 1988) is an Austrian professional ice hockey player who is currently playing for the Graz99ers of the ICE Hockey League (ICEHL). Oberkofler competed in the 2013 IIHF World Championship as a member of the Austria men's national ice hockey team.

== Playing career ==
In February 2013, Daniel, playing for Austria's men's national Ice Hockey team, scored two goals against Italy in the Group D of the Men's Final Olympic Qualification.

On May 7, 2013, the Austrian forward also scored a goal against Latvia during a preliminary round game of the 2013 IIHF World Championship in Helsinki, Finland.

At the conclusion of the 2016–17 season, and after 11 seasons playing with EHC Black Wings Linz, Oberkofler returned to his original club, Graz 99ers, on March 15, 2017.

== Career statistics ==
=== Regular season and playoffs ===
			Regular season					Playoffs
Season	Team	League	GP	G	A	Pts	PIM	GP	G	A	Pts	PIM
2002–03	Graz 99ers	AUT U20	20	5	5	10	10	—	—	—	—	—
2004–05	Graz 99ers	AUT U20	1	0	0	0	0	—	—	—	—	—
2005–06	Graz 99ers	AUT U20	20	32	31	63	30	—	—	—	—	—
2005–06	Graz 99ers	EBEL	30	0	1	1	0	—	—	—	—	—
2005–06	Kapfenberger SV	AUT.2	4	0	1	1	0	—	—	—	—	—
2006–07	Graz 99ers	EBEL	7	0	0	0	2	—	—	—	—	—
2006–07	EHC Liwest Black Wings Linz	AUT U20	14	36	29	65	34	—	—	—	—	—
2006–07	EHC Liwest Black Wings Linz	EBEL	37	1	3	4	2	—	—	—	—	—
2006–07	Steyr/Linz	AUT.3	1	1	0	1	0	—	—	—	—	—
2007–08	EHC Liwest Black Wings Linz	AUT U20	2	5	4	9	0	—	—	—	—	—
2007–08	EHC Liwest Black Wings Linz	EBEL	41	4	6	10	16	11	0	1	1	4
2008–09	EHC Liwest Black Wings Linz	EBEL	54	2	9	11	20	10	0	1	1	10
2009–10	EHC Liwest Black Wings Linz	EBEL	47	4	7	11	28	17	1	8	9	2
2010–11	EHC Liwest Black Wings Linz	EBEL	53	14	23	37	36	5	0	2	2	0
2011–12	EHC Liwest Black Wings Linz	EBEL	47	5	12	17	16	17	5	4	9	6
2012–13	EHC Liwest Black Wings Linz	EBEL	52	8	13	21	39	12	2	1	3	2
2013–14	EHC Liwest Black Wings Linz	EBEL	54	7	18	25	16	8	2	0	2	0
2014–15	EHC Liwest Black Wings Linz	EBEL	39	5	11	16	16	12	1	2	3	0
2015–16	EHC Liwest Black Wings Linz	EBEL	52	4	7	11	22	12	1	5	6	6
2016–17	EHC Liwest Black Wings Linz	EBEL	50	9	8	17	8	5	2	1	3	0
2017–18	Graz 99ers	EBEL	51	16	11	27	16	—	—	—	—	—
2018–19	Graz 99ers	EBEL	53	15	24	39	20	10	4	6	10	4
2019–20	Graz 99ers	EBEL	43	16	22	38	14	3	2	0	2	2
2020–21	Graz99ers	ICEHL	13	2	2	4	2	—	—	—	—	—
2021–22	Graz99ers	ICEHL	40	5	10	15	4	1	0	0	0	0
AUT totals			763	117	187	304	277	126	20	31	51	36

=== International ===
Year	Team	Event	GP	G	A	Pts	PIM
2006	Austria	WJC18 D1	5	4	3	7	4
2007	Austria	WJC D1	5	1	0	1	0
2008	Austria	WJC D1	5	5	4	9	8
2012	Austria	WC D1A	5	0	1	1	0
2013	Austria	OGQ	3	3	2	5	0
2013	Austria	WC	7	1	1	2	2
2014	Austria	OG	3	0	0	0	0
2014	Austria	WC D1A	5	0	2	2	2
2016	Austria	WC D1A	5	0	0	0	2
Junior totals			15	10	7	17	12
Senior totals			28	4	6	10	6
