= Gregor Baumgartner =

Austrian ice hockey player (born 1979)

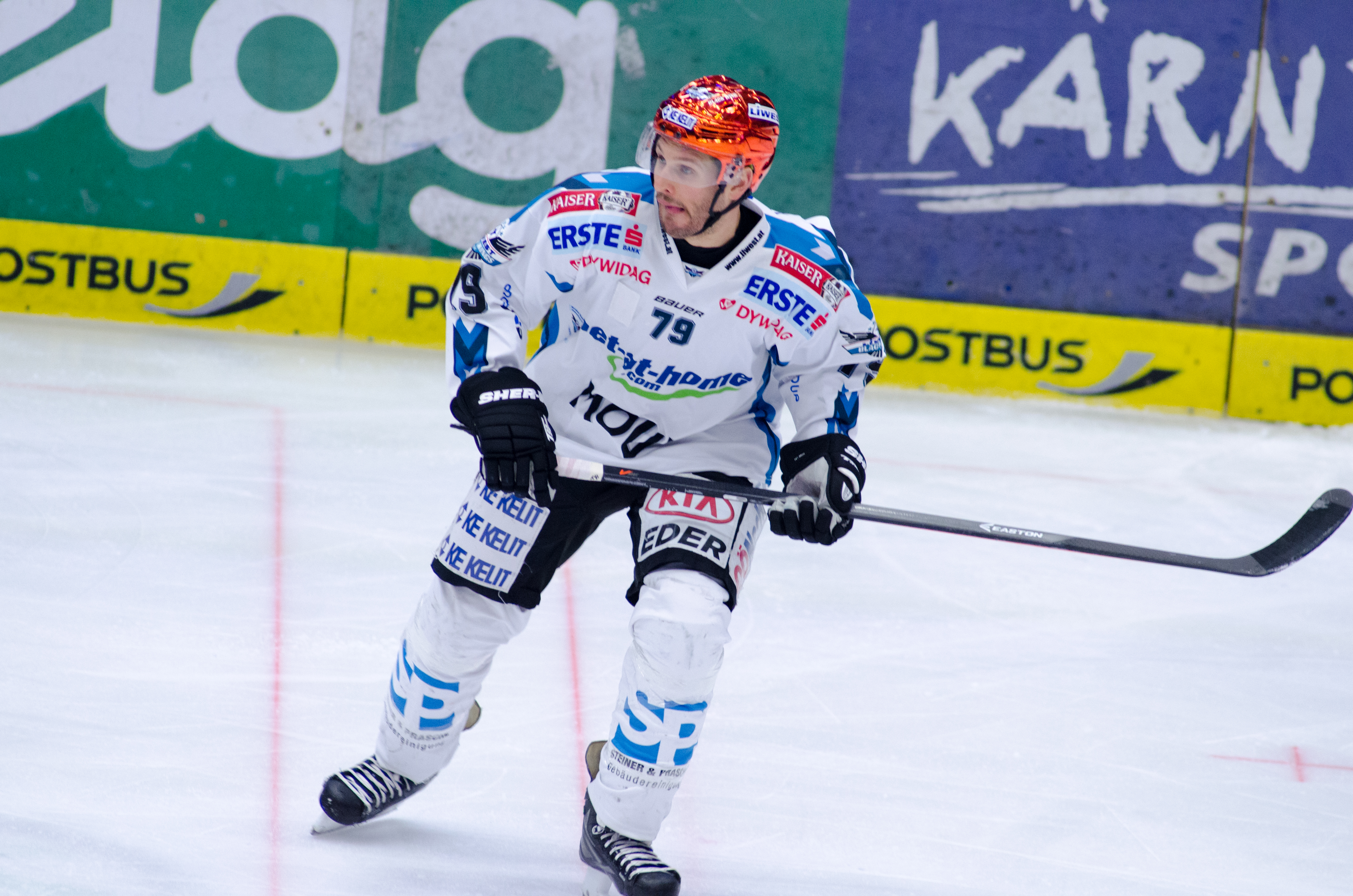
- Born: 13 July 1979 (age 46) Leoben, Austria
- Height: 6 ft 1 in (185 cm)
- Weight: 192 lb (87 kg; 13 st 10 lb)
- Position: Right wing
- Shot: Left
- Played for: Michigan K-Wings; Utah Grizzlies; Oklahoma City Blazers; Idaho Steelheads; Fort Worth Brahmas; Pensacola Ice Pilots; Vienna Capitals; EC Red Bull Salzburg; EHC Black Wings Linz
- National team: Austria
- NHL draft: 37th overall, 1997; Montreal Canadiens; 156th overall, 1999; Dallas Stars
- Playing career: 1999–2015

Gregor Baumgartner (born 13 July 1979) is an Austrian former professional ice hockey winger who played the last 9 seasons of his career for EHC Black Wings Linz in the Erste Bank Eishockey Liga. He was drafted 37th overall in the 1997 NHL entry draft by the Montreal Canadiens and then drafted 156th overall in the 1999 NHL entry draft by the Dallas Stars.

== Career statistics ==
			Regular season					Playoffs
Season	Team	League	GP	G	A	Pts	PIM	GP	G	A	Pts	PIM
1994–95	Sainte-Foy Gouverneurs	QMAAA	43	28	29	57	2	12	9	4	13	4
1995–96	Clarkson University	NCAA	7	0	1	1	0	—	—	—	—	—
1995–96	Gatineau L'Intrepide	QMAAA	15	8	11	19	6	4	3	2	5	0
1996–97	Laval Titan College Francais	QMJHL	68	19	44	63	15	3	0	0	0	0
1997–98	Laval Titan College Francais	QMJHL	68	31	51	82	10	16	5	12	17	6
1998–99	Acadie-Bathurst Titan	QMJHL	68	33	58	91	14	23	8	8	16	8
1999–00	Michigan K-Wings	IHL	59	6	9	15	11	—	—	—	—	—
2000–01	Utah Grizzlies	IHL	31	3	2	5	4	—	—	—	—	—
2000–01	Oklahoma City Blazers	CHL	6	2	3	5	8	—	—	—	—	—
2000–01	Idaho Steelheads	WCHL	4	2	2	4	2	—	—	—	—	—
2001–02	Utah Grizzlies	AHL	34	10	10	20	4	1	0	0	0	0
2001–02	Fort Worth Brahmas	CHL	3	2	1	3	2	—	—	—	—	—
2002–03	Pensacola Ice Pilots	ECHL	58	28	24	52	29	—	—	—	—	—
2003–04	Vienna Capitals	EBEL	23	5	4	9	12	—	—	—	—	—
2004–05	EC Salzburg	EBEL	—	—	—	—	—	—	—	—	—	—
2004–05	Vienna Capitals	EBEL	26	6	10	16	4	10	2	1	3	2
2005–06	Vienna Capitals	EBEL	45	10	20	30	36	5	0	0	0	0
2006–07	EHC Linz	EBEL	55	28	20	48	44	3	0	1	1	0
2007–08	EHC Linz	EBEL	46	18	19	37	14	11	3	2	5	4
2008–09	EHC Linz	EBEL	52	21	20	41	22	6	1	1	2	4
2009–10	EHC Linz	EBEL	54	14	21	35	28	18	5	2	7	10
2010–11	EHC Linz	EBEL	49	8	8	16	10	1	0	0	0	0
2011–12	EHC Linz	EBEL	49	22	24	46	10	17	9	3	12	6
2012–13	EHC Linz	EBEL	52	14	25	39	8	13	1	4	5	2
2013–14	EHC Linz	EBEL	54	12	12	24	14	8	1	0	1	0
2014–15	EHC Linz	EBEL	8	0	0	0	0	—	—	—	—	—
AHL totals			34	10	10	20	4	1	0	0	0	0
ECHL totals			58	28	24	52	29	—	—	—	—	—
