= Marcel Rodman =

Slovenian ice hockey player (born 1981)

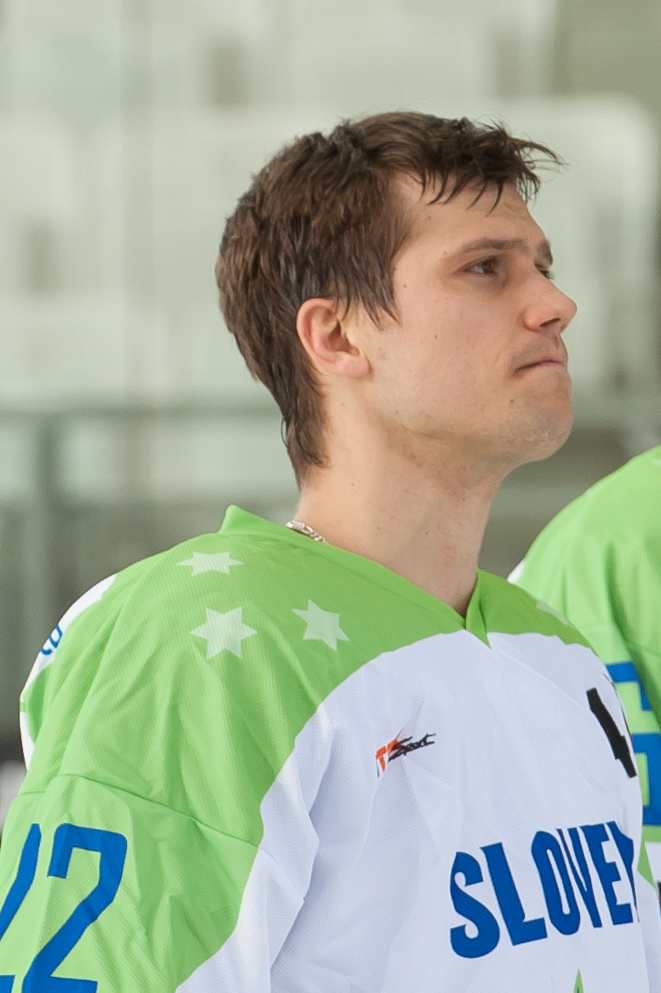
- Born: September 25, 1981 (age 44) Rodine, Yugoslavia
- Height: 6 ft 1 in (185 cm)
- Weight: 187 lb (85 kg; 13 st 5 lb)
- Position: Right wing
- Shot: Right
- Played for: HK Acroni Jesenice; Graz 99ers Krefeld Pinguine; Vienna Capitals; Schwenninger Wild Wings; KHL Medveščak Zagreb; EC KAC; Dresdner Eislöwen; SC Bietigheim-Bissingen; Tölzer Löwen
- National team: Slovenia
- NHL draft: 282nd overall, 2001; Boston Bruins
- Playing career: 2001–2018

Marcel Rodman (September 25, 1981) is a Slovenian former professional ice hockey forward.

== Playing career ==
Rodman was drafted by the Boston Bruins of the National Hockey League (NHL) in 2001, but never played in the NHL.

He has played for the Krefeld Pinguine of the DEL, and the Graz 99ers, Vienna Capitals and HK Acroni Jesenice of the Austrian Hockey League.

On July 18, 2013, Rodman left SC Bietigheim-Bissingen of the 2nd Bundesliga and signed as a free agent to newly promoted DEL club, Schwenningen Wild Wings.

During the 2014–15 season, Rodman left KHL Medveščak Zagreb after only appearing in 9 scoreless games with the club. He returned to the EBEL, signing with EC KAC for the remainder of the season. In 21 games with KAC, Rodman brought stability and depth to the forward lines, scoring 11 points before suffering a season-ending injury preventing him from contributing in the playoffs in which KAC would claim the championship.

His younger brother David also played the sport professionally.

== International play ==
He participated at several IIHF World Championships as a member of the Slovenia men's national ice hockey team.

Rodman played for the Slovenian national team at the 2008 IIHF World Championship, where he had 1 assist in 5 games.

== Career statistics ==
=== Regular season and playoffs ===
			Regular season					Playoffs
Season	Team	League	GP	G	A	Pts	PIM	GP	G	A	Pts	PIM
1997–98	HK Acroni Jesenice	SVN Jr	44	29	44	73	14	—	—	—	—	—
1998–99	Pickering Panthers	OPJHL	37	30	21	51	8	—	—	—	—	—
1999–00	Peterborough Petes	OHL	61	17	20	37	16	5	1	2	3	0
2000–01	Peterborough Petes	OHL	61	36	35	71	14	7	4	2	6	2
2001–02	HK Acroni Jesenice	IEHL	7	4	2	6	4	—	—	—	—	—
2001–02	HK Acroni Jesenice	SVN	9	12	6	18	4	—	—	—	—	—
2002–03	Graz 99ers	EBEL	41	20	24	44	18	3	2	1	3	4
2003–04	Krefeld Pinguine	DEL	52	3	9	12	18	—	—	—	—	—
2004–05	HK Akroni Jesenice	IEHL	25	12	24	36	20	—	—	—	—	—
2004–05	HK Akroni Jesenice	SVN	17	10	18	28	36	—	—	—	—	—
2005–06	Graz 99ers	EBEL	43	7	17	24	32	—	—	—	—	—
2005–06	HK Akroni Jesenice	IEHL	2	1	2	3	0	—	—	—	—	—
2005–06	HK Acroni Jesenice	SVN	7	3	6	9	2	—	—	—	—	—
2006–07	HK Akroni Jesenice	EBEL	43	21	40	61	55	—	—	—	—	—
2006–07	HD Hidria Jesenice	SVN	2	1	2	3	4	—	—	—	—	—
2007–08	Vienna Capitals	EBEL	49	18	35	53	40	7	4	4	8	4
2008–09	HK Akroni Jesenice	EBEL	53	21	36	57	70	5	2	3	5	34
2008–09	HK Acroni Jesenice	SVN	—	—	—	—	—	5	0	2	2	2
2009–10	Vienna Capitals	EBEL	38	19	23	42	42	12	2	6	8	10
2010–11	Vienna Capitals	EBEL	42	12	18	30	64	11	3	9	12	10
2011–12	Vienna Capitals	EBEL	31	5	12	17	41	7	0	3	3	2
2012–13	SC Bietigheim–Bissingen	GER-2	45	28	39	67	60	11	7	4	11	18
2013–14	Schwenninger Wild Wings	DEL	39	5	9	14	34	—	—	—	—	—
2014–15	KHL Medveščak Zagreb	KHL	9	0	0	0	39	—	—	—	—	—
2014–15	EC KAC	EBEL	21	5	6	11	12	—	—	—	—	—
2016–17	Dresdner Eislöwen	DEL2	33	5	25	30	40	—	—	—	—	—
2016–17	Bietigheim Steelers	DEL2	16	6	8	14	14	13	4	8	12	2
2017–18	Tölzer Löwen	DEL2	42	13	23	36	20	—	—	—	—	—
EBEL totals			354	124	207	331	368	45	13	26	39	64

=== International ===
Year	Team	Event	GP	G	A	Pts	PIM
1998	Slovenia	EJC C	4	2	2	4	0
1999	Slovenia	WJC C	4	0	0	0	2
2000	Slovenia	WJC C	4	3	5	8	14
2001	Slovenia	WJC D2	4	5	1	6	0
2001	Slovenia	WC D1	5	2	3	5	2
2002	Slovenia	WC	6	6	1	7	2
2005	Slovenia	WC	6	1	2	3	0
2006	Slovenia	WC	6	0	4	4	6
2008	Slovenia	WC	5	0	1	1	6
2009	Slovenia	OGQ	3	2	0	2	4
2009	Slovenia	WC D1	5	0	5	5	2
2010	Slovenia	WC D1	5	1	5	6	6
2011	Slovenia	WC	6	0	3	3	4
2012	Slovenia	WC D1A	5	1	0	1	16
2013	Slovenia	OGQ	3	0	2	2	4
2013	Slovenia	WC	7	1	0	1	2
2014	Slovenia	OG	5	1	1	2	0
2014	Slovenia	WC D1A	5	0	2	2	8
2015	Slovenia	WC	7	0	0	0	4
2016	Slovenia	OGQ	3	0	0	0	0
2018	Slovenia	OG	4	0	0	0	2
Junior totals			16	10	8	18	16
Senior totals			100	17	38	55	86
