= Mitamura =

Mitamura (written: 三田村) is a Japanese surname. Notable people with the surname include:

- Kohei Mitamura (三田村 康平, born 1992), Japanese ice hockey player
- Kunihiko Mitamura (三田村 邦彦, born 1953), Japanese actor and singer
