= Raphael Herburger =

Austrian ice hockey player (born 1989)

- Born: 2 January 1989 (age 37) Dornbirn, Austria
- Height: 5 ft 10 in (178 cm)
- Weight: 165 lb (75 kg; 11 st 11 lb)
- Position: Centre
- Shoots: Left
- ICEHL team Former teams: EC KAC; EHC Biel; EC Red Bull Salzburg; HC Lugano
- National team: Austria
- Playing career: 2008–present

Raphael Herburger (born 2 January 1989) is an Austrian professional ice hockey forward who is currently playing for EC KAC in the ICE Hockey League (ICEHL).

== Playing career ==
Herburger returned to Austria after three seasons in Switzerland with EHC Biel of the top-tier National League A. He signed a two-year contract with reigning back-to-back Champions, EC Red Bull Salzburg on 2 May 2016.

Herburger competed in the 2013 IIHF World Championship as a member of the Austria men's national ice hockey team.

== Career statistics ==
=== Regular season and playoffs ===
			Regular season					Playoffs
Season	Team	League	GP	G	A	Pts	PIM	GP	G	A	Pts	PIM
2005–06	EC Dornbirn	AUT.2	32	7	6	13	30	—	—	—	—	—
2006–07	EC Dornbirn	AUT.2	30	10	27	37	50	5	3	2	5	4
2007–08	EC Dornbirn	AUT.2	31	16	31	47	67	12	2	11	13	20
2007–08	SPG Dornbirn/Lustenau	AUT U20	1	0	1	1	4	—	—	—	—	—
2008–09	EC KAC	EBEL	44	9	6	15	24	17	2	4	6	20
2009–10	EC KAC	EBEL	38	4	9	13	26	—	—	—	—	—
2010–11	EC KAC	EBEL	52	3	17	20	52	17	1	4	5	37
2011–12	EC KAC	EBEL	45	7	12	19	59	15	3	9	12	31
2012–13	EC KAC	EBEL	10	0	2	2	22	12	4	6	10	14
2013–14	EHC Biel	NLA	45	6	7	13	16	—	—	—	—	—
2014–15	EHC Biel	NLA	41	8	8	16	41	7	2	3	5	0
2015–16	EHC Biel	NLA	36	6	10	16	8	—	—	—	—	—
2016–17	EC Red Bull Salzburg	EBEL	50	9	19	28	26	8	0	3	3	14
2017–18	EC Red Bull Salzburg	EBEL	43	14	21	35	22	16	3	5	8	8
2018–19	EC Red Bull Salzburg	EBEL	47	11	20	31	24	13	4	1	5	8
2019–20	EC Red Bull Salzburg	EBEL	35	14	26	40	24	3	0	1	1	6
2020–21	HC Lugano	NL	47	9	12	21	38	5	0	0	0	2
2021–22	HC Lugano	NL	45	5	13	18	30	6	0	1	1	4
2022–23	HC Lugano	NL	50	2	8	10	20	8	0	1	1	2
2023–24	EC KAC	ICEHL	29	8	12	20	35	10	3	3	6	6
2024–25	EC KAC	ICEHL	37	10	21	31	14	17	8	6	14	4
2025–26	EC KAC	ICEHL	48	8	23	31	18	6	1	1	2	0
ICEHL totals			478	97	188	285	346	134	29	43	72	148
NL totals			264	36	58	94	153	26	2	5	7	8

=== International ===
Year	Team	Event	GP	G	A	Pts	PIM
2006	Austria	WJC18 D1	5	1	4	5	8
2007	Austria	WJC18 D1	5	0	1	1	8
2008	Austria	WJC D1	5	4	4	8	4
2009	Austria	WJC D1	5	0	6	6	2
2012	Austria	WC D1A	5	1	4	5	2
2013	Austria	WC	7	1	0	1	4
2014	Austria	OG	2	0	0	0	2
2015	Austria	WC	7	0	1	1	2
2016	Austria	WC D1A	5	1	1	2	2
2016	Austria	OGQ	3	0	2	2	2
2019	Austria	WC	7	1	1	2	16
2021	Austria	OGQ	3	1	0	1	2
2024	Austria	OGQ	2	1	0	1	0
Junior totals			20	5	15	20	22
Senior totals			41	6	9	15	32
