= David Rodman =

Slovenian ice hockey player

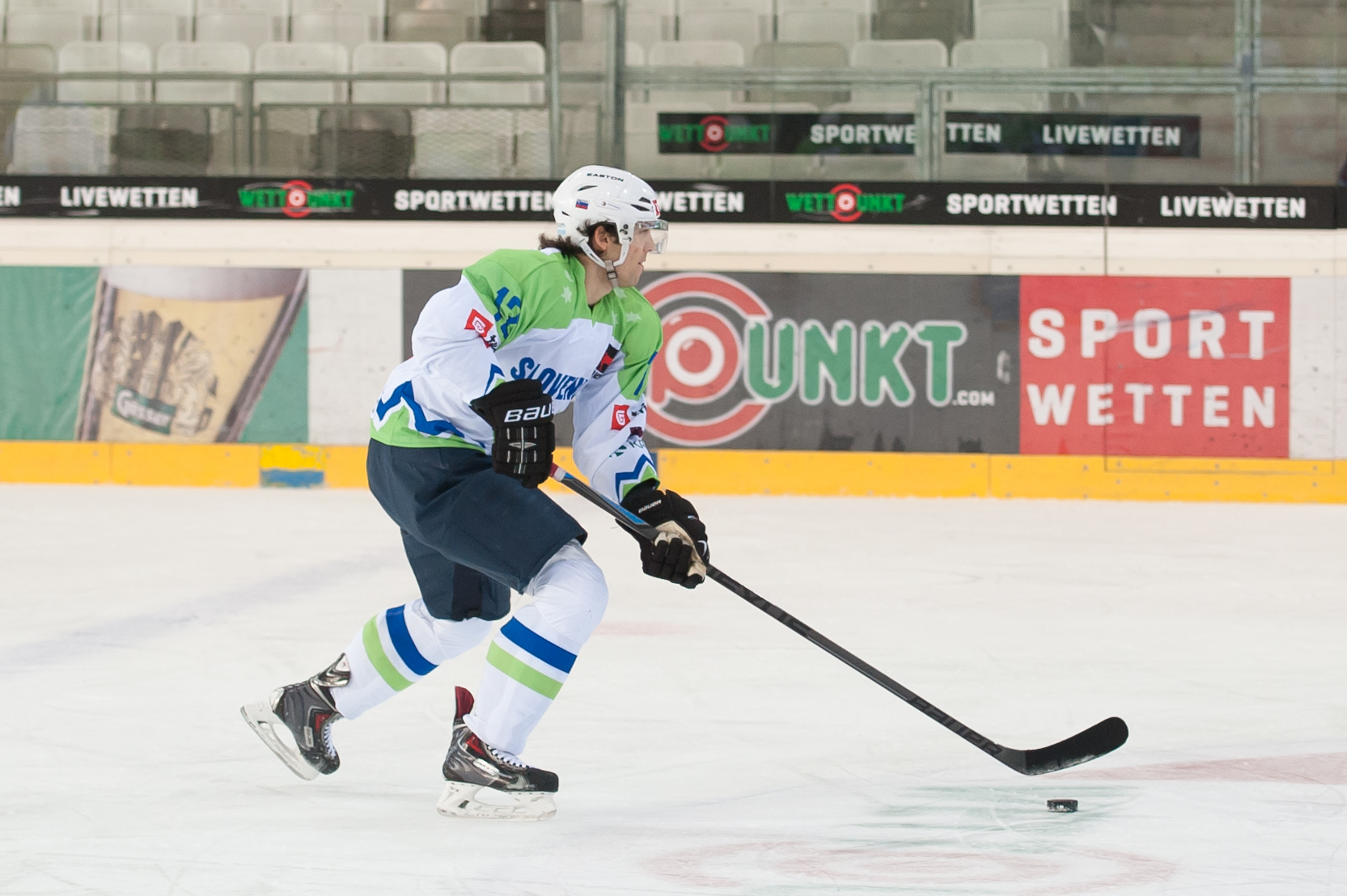
- Born: 10 September 1983 (age 41); Jesenice, SFR Yugoslavia
- Height: 6 ft 1 in (185 cm)
- Weight: 183 lb (83 kg; 13 st 1 lb)
- Position: Right wing
- Shot: Left
- Slovak team Former teams: DVTK Jegesmedvék; EHC Black Wings Linz; HK Acroni Jesenice; Vienna Capitals; IK Oskarshamn; SC Bietigheim Steelers; Graz99ers; Dresdner Eislöwen; Brûleurs de Loups; HDD Jesenice
- National team: Slovenia
- NHL draft: Undrafted
- Playing career: 2003–2020

David Rodman (born 10 September 1983) is a Slovenian former professional ice hockey player. He last played for DVTK Jegesmedvék of the Slovak Tipsport Liga in 2020.

He previously played with the Graz99ers of the EBEL during the 2014–15 season, on 15 January 2015, from Swedish HockeyAllsvenskan club, IK Oskarshamn. On 8 August 2015 Rodman returned to the Germany second tier, signing a one-year deal with Dresdner Eislöwen of the DEL2.

He participated at several Ice Hockey World Championships as a member of the Slovenia men's national ice hockey team.

His elder brother Marcel also played the sport professionally.

== Career statistics ==
=== Regular season and playoffs ===
			Regular season					Playoffs
Season	Team	League	GP	G	A	Pts	PIM	GP	G	A	Pts	PIM
2000–01	HK Kranjska Gora	SVN	17	11	11	22	24	—	—	—	—	—
2001–02	Val–d'Or Foreurs	QMJHL	36	12	13	25	16	7	3	2	5	6
2002–03	Val–d'Or Foreurs	QMJHL	65	26	44	70	79	9	3	2	5	6
2003–04	Black Wings Linz	AUT	48	1	2	3	20	3	0	0	0	0
2004–05	HK Jesenice	IEHL	26	4	10	14	53	—	—	—	—	—
2004–05	HK Jesenice	SVN	23	11	14	25	41	—	—	—	—	—
2005–06	HK Jesenice	IEHL	23	8	14	22	96	6	2	5	7	10
2005–06	HK Jesenice	SVN	21	13	31	44	45	—	—	—	—	—
2006–07	HK Jesenice	AUT	56	29	35	64	87	—	—	—	—	—
2006–07	HD Mladi Jesenice	SVN	1	0	0	0	2	—	—	—	—	—
2007–08	Vienna Capitals	AUT	45	18	28	46	42	7	2	6	8	6
2008–09	HK Jesenice	AUT	54	26	29	55	84	5	1	1	2	41
2008–09	HK Jesenice	SVN	—	—	—	—	—	5	3	2	5	2
2009–10	Vienna Capitals	AUT	52	22	36	58	50	12	5	7	12	14
2010–11	Vienna Capitals	AUT	41	14	26	40	105	10	5	8	13	43
2011–12	IK Oskarshamn	Allsv	51	14	21	35	68	5	3	1	4	0
2012–13	Bietigheim Steelers	GER.2	29	12	33	45	12	14	5	12	17	8
2013–14	IK Oskarshamn	Allsv	35	9	15	24	16	—	—	—	—	—
2014–15	IK Oskarshamn	Allsv	39	8	14	22	43	—	—	—	—	—
2014–15	Graz99ers	AUT	12	2	5	7	0	—	—	—	—	—
2015–16	Dresdner Eislöwen	GER.2	49	16	27	43	80	11	2	3	5	14
2016–17	HDD Jesenice	AlpsHL	4	1	2	3	4	—	—	—	—	—
2016–17	Brûleurs de Loups	FRA	25	11	20	31	10	12	1	10	11	10
2017–18	Brûleurs de Loups	FRA	38	11	45	56	38	17	3	8	11	10
2018–19	HDD Jesenice	AlpsHL	23	5	18	23	18	11	5	4	9	16
2018–19	HDD Jesenice	SVN	3	0	2	2	0	4	3	2	5	2
2019–20	DVTK Jegesmedvék	SVK	50	10	21	31	98	—	—	—	—	—
AUT totals			308	112	161	273	388	37	13	22	35	104
Allsv totals			125	31	50	81	127	5	3	1	4	0

=== International ===
Year	Team	Event	GP	G	A	Pts	PIM
2000	Slovenia	EJC D1	4	7	1	8	2
2001	Slovenia	WJC D2	4	4	0	4	4
2001	Slovenia	WJC18 D2	4	9	2	11	6
2002	Slovenia	WJC D1	4	4	4	8	6
2003	Slovenia	WJC D1	5	2	0	2	20
2005	Slovenia	OGQ	3	0	0	0	0
2005	Slovenia	WC	6	0	0	0	2
2006	Slovenia	WC	6	0	0	0	16
2007	Slovenia	WC D1	5	2	4	6	2
2008	Slovenia	WC	5	1	1	2	6
2009	Slovenia	OGQ	3	0	1	1	2
2009	Slovenia	WC D1	5	1	3	4	6
2010	Slovenia	WC D1	5	1	3	4	8
2011	Slovenia	WC	6	1	3	4	2
2012	Slovenia	WC D1A	5	3	2	5	10
2013	Slovenia	OGQ	3	4	2	6	6
2013	Slovenia	WC	7	0	3	3	4
2014	Slovenia	OG	5	0	3	3	0
2014	Slovenia	WC D1A	5	0	1	1	8
2017	Slovenia	WC	7	1	0	1	2
2018	Slovenia	OG	3	0	0	0	0
2019	Slovenia	WC D1A	5	1	3	4	0
Junior totals			21	26	7	33	38
Senior totals			84	15	29	44	74
