= Michael Grabner =

Austrian ice hockey player (born 1987)

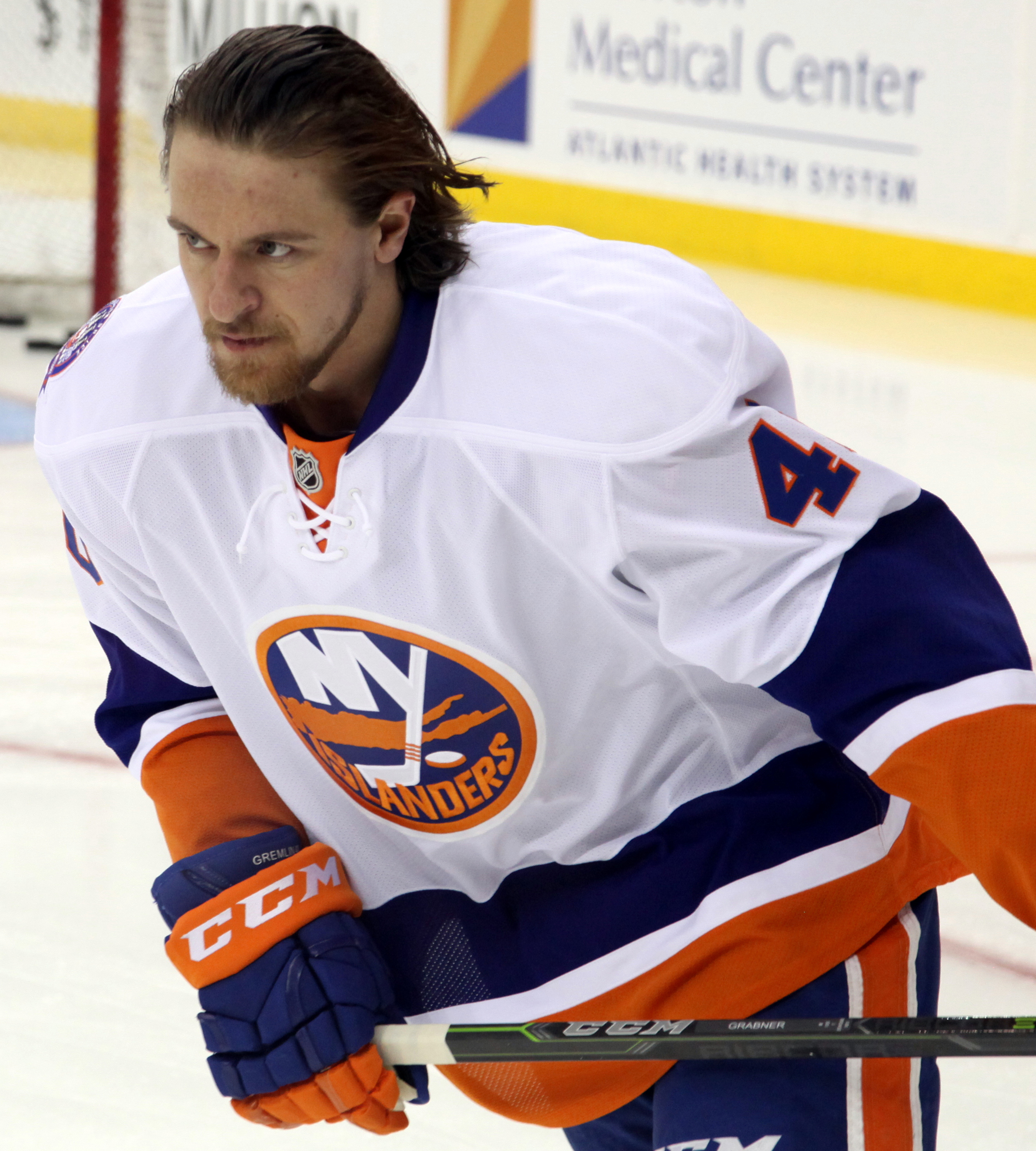
- Grabner with the New York Islanders in 2015
- Born: 5 October 1987 (age 39) Villach, Austria
- Height: 6 ft 1 in (185 cm)
- Weight: 181 lb (82 kg; 12 st 13 lb)
- Position: Right wing
- Shot: Left
- Played for: EC VSV; Vancouver Canucks; New York Islanders; Toronto Maple Leafs; New York Rangers; New Jersey Devils; Arizona Coyotes
- National team: Austria
- NHL draft: 14th overall, 2006; Vancouver Canucks
- Playing career: 2003–2020

Michael-René Grabner (born 5 October 1987) is an Austrian former professional ice hockey player. Grabner grew up playing for the local team in Villach, EC VSV. He moved to North America at the age of 17 and joined the Spokane Chiefs of the major junior Western Hockey League (WHL) to further his hockey career. After his second season with the Chiefs, he was selected 14th overall by the Vancouver Canucks in the 2006 NHL entry draft.

Grabner played one more season in the WHL before moving to the American Hockey League (AHL), where he played two seasons in the Canucks' farm system. He was traded during the 2010 NHL entry draft to the Florida Panthers, but was claimed by the New York Islanders after Florida placed him on waivers with the intention of assigning him to their AHL affiliate. Grabner spent five seasons with the Islanders before being traded to the Toronto Maple Leafs in 2015. Internationally, Grabner has appeared for Austria in both junior and senior tournaments, and played in the 2014 Winter Olympics.

== Playing career ==
=== Early career ===
Grabner was born in Villach, and began playing hockey at the age of five. He played in the 2001 Quebec International Pee-Wee Hockey Tournament with a youth team from Austria.

Grabner joined his EC VSV's junior team, scoring 10 points over 13 games in 2002–03. The following year, he improved to 32 goals and five assists over 23 games, while also debuting with EC VSV's men's team in the Austrian Hockey League. In the subsequent off-season, he was selected 22nd overall by the Spokane Chiefs in the Canadian Hockey League (CHL) Import Draft. Grabner believed that playing major junior in North America would help his goal of making it to the NHL. He had been exposed to Chiefs general manager Tim Speltz through a connection with his head coach in EC VSV, Greg Holst.

Grabner left Austria to join Spokane for the 2004–05 WHL season, but suffered a broken collarbone in his first exhibition game. He missed approximately a month with the injury and scored his first WHL goal on 29 October 2004, in a 4–2 loss against the Seattle Thunderbirds. He went on to record 13 goals and 24 points in his rookie season.

The following season, he improved to 36 goals and 50 points. Playing in his NHL draft year, he competed in the CHL Top Prospects Game and scored a goal and two assists. Shortly thereafter, he notched his first WHL career hat trick on 4 February 2007, in a 7–5 win against the Tri-City Americans. Grabner's draft stock went up significantly in the second half of the season, as he scored 22 goals in the final 23 games of 2005–06.

He entered the 2006 NHL entry draft having been ranked 23rd overall among prospects playing in North America by the NHL Central Scouting Bureau. He was chosen 14th overall by the Vancouver Canucks. Grabner was admittedly surprised to be chosen in that position of the draft, as he was projected to be a late first-round to early second-round pick. He had been scouted as highly skilled offensively with his speed and his shot his strengths.

He participated in his first NHL training camp in 2006, before being returned to the Chiefs for the 2006–07 season. Early in his third WHL season, he suffered a hip pointer after receiving a slash. Due to lingering pain from the injury he was in and out of the lineup for several games before being sidelined for a month in November and early-December. In mid-February, he recorded six goals in a span of three games to be named WHL and CHL Player of the Week (12–18 February 2007). Grabner with 39 goals and 16 assists in 55 games for a point-per-game pace over the course of the season. However, he was criticized by his coach for his lack of physical play.

=== Manitoba Moose and Vancouver Canucks ===
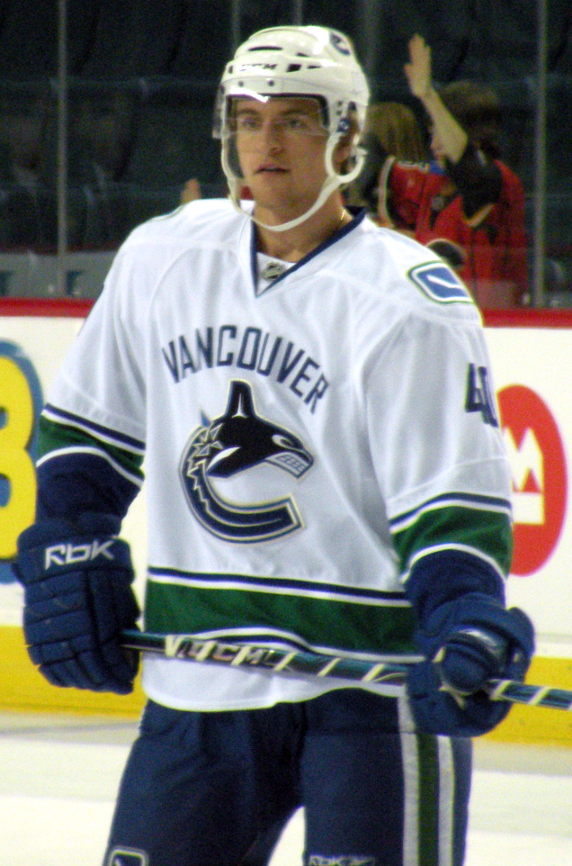
Grabner while a member of the Vancouver Canucks in 2009

After the Chiefs were eliminated from the 2007 WHL playoffs, Grabner joined the Canucks' American Hockey League affiliate, the Manitoba Moose for their final two games of the regular season and the playoffs. Grabner joined the Moose for his first full professional season in 2007–08, recording 44 points in 74 games as a rookie.

The following season, on 26 February 2009, Grabner was recalled by the Canucks to replace Pavol Demitra who suffered a fractured finger the night before. However, later that day, Grabner was reassigned to Manitoba after Demitra was deemed fit to play. He finished his second season with the Moose improving to 30 goals, tied for the team lead with Jason Krog, and 48 points in 66 games, helping the Moose to the league's best regular season record. After eliminating the Toronto Marlies and Grand Rapids Griffins in the first two rounds of the 2009 playoffs, Grabner scored the series-clinching goal in the sixth game of the semifinals, a 3–1 win over the Houston Aeros. Grabner finished with 17 points in 20 games as the Moose finished as Calder Cup runners-up.

Coming off a successful second AHL season, Grabner was expected to challenge for a roster spot at the Canucks' 2009–10 training camp, but was sent back down to the Moose before the start of the regular season. After a quick start with the Moose, however, scoring four goals in five games, he was called up by the Canucks on 14 October 2009, to replace injured star winger Daniel Sedin. Grabner then scored his first NHL goal on 21 October on the powerplay against Antti Niemi in a 3–2 win against the Chicago Blackhawks. Nine games into his initial stint with the Canucks, however, he injured himself during a pre-game warmup on 1 November. Grabner was kicking a soccer ball around with teammates before a game against the Colorado Avalanche when he rolled over his ankle.

Upon recovering, he returned to the Moose on 27 December 2009, until being recalled on 17 March 2010, following an injury to Canucks forward Mikael Samuelsson. On 2 April, Grabner scored his first NHL career hat trick in a 5–4 shootout win against the Anaheim Ducks. Remaining with the club for the 2010 playoffs, Grabner notched his first career NHL post-season goal against Antti Niemi (the same goaltender he scored his first regular season goal against) on 1 May 2010, in the opening game of the second round against the Chicago Blackhawks.

=== New York Islanders ===
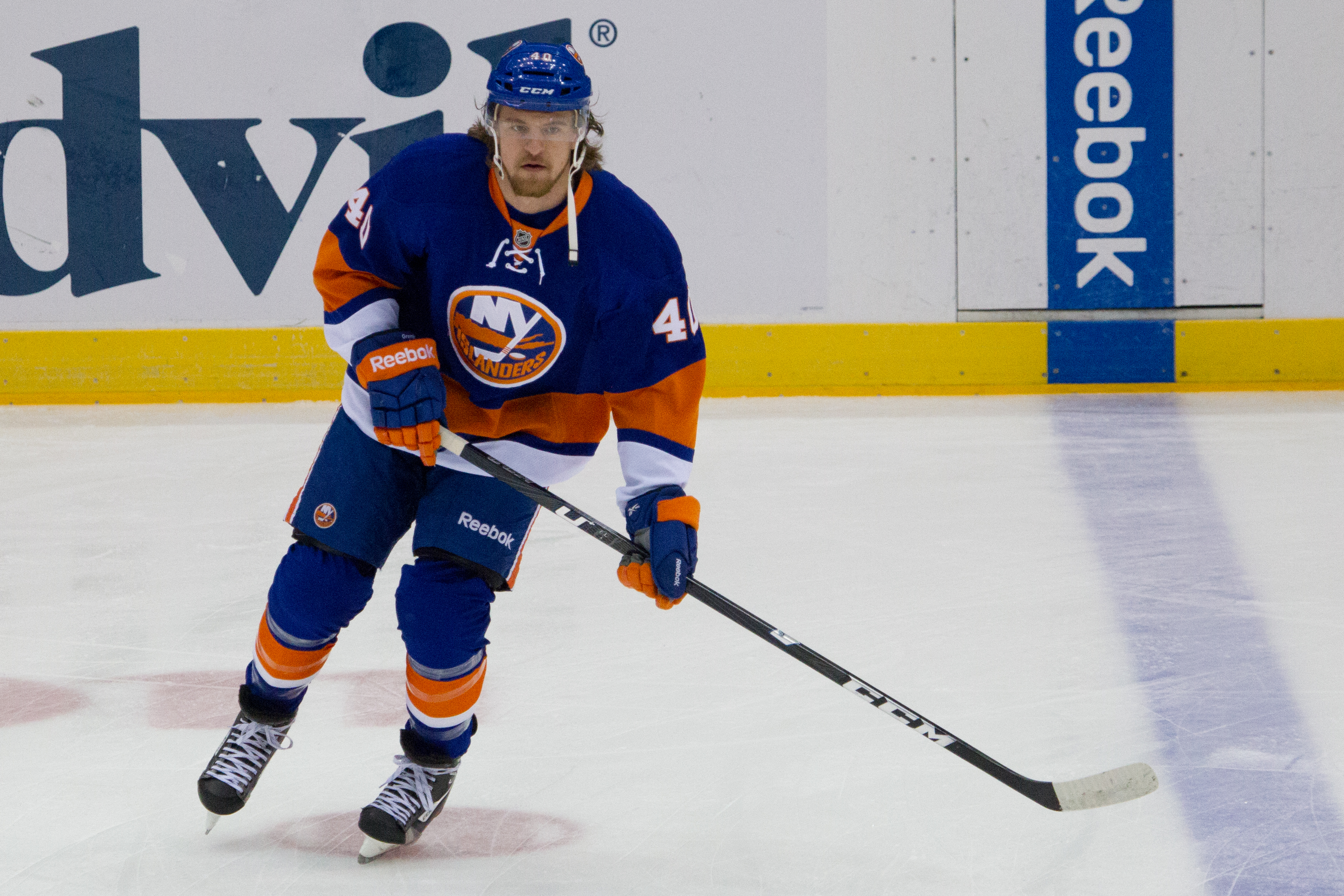
Grabner skating with the New York Islanders during the 2012–13 season

During the 2010 NHL entry draft on 25 June 2010, Grabner was traded, along with Steve Bernier and the Canucks first round choice (the 25th selection, used to select Quinton Howden) to the Florida Panthers for Keith Ballard and Victor Oreskovich. Grabner attended the Panthers training camp, but failed to make the team. On 3 October 2010, Grabner was placed on waivers by the Panthers, who intended to assign him to their AHL affiliate, the Rochester Americans. However, he was claimed by the New York Islanders two days later.

Grabner played his first game with the Islanders on 11 October 2010, against the New York Rangers. His first point with the Islanders came on 13 October, and his first goal with the Islanders came against Craig Anderson of the Colorado Avalanche on 16 October. In January 2011 Grabner was selected to participate in the 2011 SuperSkills as one of twelve rookies in the competition, winning the fastest skater competition with times of 14.061 and 14.238. In February, Grabner led all rookies in scoring with 10 goals and 16 points. He also had a six-game goal scoring streak, which was the longest rookie streak since the 2006–07 season when Evgeni Malkin also scored in six straight. For his efforts Grabner was named rookie of the month. He finished his rookie year with 34 goals and 52 points, his goal total leading all rookies, as well as the Islanders. Ranking third in rookie points Grabner earned a Calder Memorial Trophy nomination for NHL rookie of the year. Following his successful rookie year the Islanders signed Grabner to a five-year, $15 million contract extension on 13 May 2011, backloaded to start at $1M and then increase by another $1M each year.

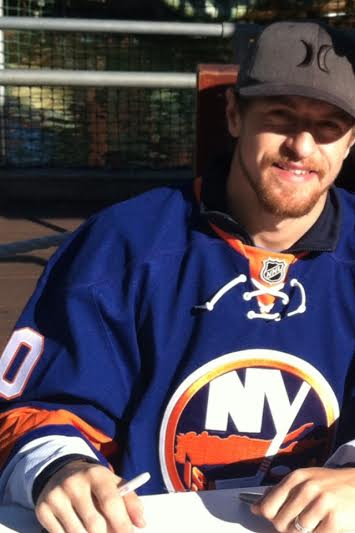
Grabner with the New York Islanders in October 2013

On 21 October 2013, Grabner was suspended for two games for an illegal check to the head of Carolina Hurricanes forward Nathan Gerbe. Later that season, on 27 February 2014, Grabner accomplished a rare feat, scoring two short handed goals on the same penalty kill in a 5-4 overtime win over the Toronto Maple Leafs, scoring both goals in a span of 46 seconds; Grabner became the first player to score two shorthanded goals on the same penalty kill since Ryan O'Reilly did it on 2 February 2010. However, O'Reilly scored two on a four-minute penalty kill, while Grabner did it during a standard two minute penalty.

=== Toronto Maple Leafs ===
On 17 September 2015, after five seasons with the Islanders, Grabner was traded to Toronto Maple Leafs in exchange for Taylor Beck, Carter Verhaeghe, Matt Finn, Tom Nilsson, and goaltender Christopher Gibson, and made alternate captain of the Maple Leafs. The trade was primarily to free up roster spots for the Maple Leafs, who were one away from the maximum of 50 organizational contracts.

Throughout the year, Grabner failed to score at his previous pace as with the Islanders, but was a decent addition on the penalty kill and had some hot streaks. Despite the decrease in production, the Maple Leafs had interest in bringing Grabner back. However, according to head coach Mike Babcock, a plethora of young players expected to make the roster the following season prevented the team from signing him; assistant coach D.J. Smith had a particularly strong desire for Grabner to stay in Toronto.

=== New York Rangers ===
On 1 July 2016, Grabner signed a two-year, $3.2 million contract with the New York Rangers. Grabner got off to a hot start with the Rangers, scoring his first hat-trick as a Ranger against the Tampa Bay Lightning on 30 October. He finished second on the team in goals with 27, his highest single-season total since his rookie season in 2010–11.

=== New Jersey Devils ===
With the Rangers committed to a full rebuild, Grabner was traded on 22 February 2018 to the New Jersey Devils in exchange for Yegor Rykov and a second-round draft pick in the 2018 NHL entry draft. This marked the first ever trade between the two teams. Grabner is the 11th player in NHL history to complete the "Hudson River Triple" (being a member of the Rangers, Islanders, and Devils), joining the likes of Sergei Nemchinov, Kevin Weekes, and P. A. Parenteau. Grabner was unable to replicate his offensive numbers with the Devils down the stretch of the regular season, contributing with just 2 goals and 5 points in 21 games.

=== Arizona Coyotes ===
As a free agent from the Devils in the off-season, Grabner agreed to a three-year, $10.05 million contract with the Arizona Coyotes on 1 July 2018. After playing in 25 games for the Coyotes, garnering 11 points, Grabner was listed as being out indefinitely due to an eye injury as a result of a stick clipping his eye. He finished first in the NHL in the shorthanded goals category by the end of the season; of Grabner's nine total goals, six were scored shorthanded, despite playing in only 41 games (half the season) due to the eye injury. After two seasons with the Coyotes, on 3 October 2020, Grabner was placed on waivers by the Coyotes and bought out from the final year of his contract.

== International play ==
Grabner made his international debut with Austria in Division I play of the 2004 IIHF World U18 Championships in Minsk, Belarus. Underaged for the tournament at sixteen-years-old, he scored three goals and an assist in five games. The following year, he competed for Austria in Division I of the 2005 World Junior Championships, held in Great Britain. He recorded three points in four games as Austria finished third in Group A. Several months later, he was named to his second under-18 team for the 2005 IIHF World U18 Championships, where Austria again competed in Division I play. Grabner tied for second in team-scoring with four goals and an assists over five games. Austria finished in fifth place out of six teams in Group A, coming within a loss of being relegated to Division II for the next year. He joined Austria in their qualifying tournament for the 2010 Winter Olympics in early 2009 and led the four team tournament in scoring with five goals; Austria finished second to Germany and failed to qualify for the Olympics.

It was during the 2012 World Championships that Grabner first played for the Austrian national team. Austria participated in Division IA, the second tier of the World Championships, and earned a promotion to the elite level for 2013.

He also represented Austria in the 2014 Olympic Games in Sochi, where he scored five goals and made one assist. He scored a hat-trick against Finland. He finished tied for first in goal-scoring and tied for fifth in points. He led Austria in scoring.

== Personal life ==
On 31 March 2011, Grabner's wife Heather, whom he met while playing in Spokane, gave birth to a baby boy.

== Career statistics ==
=== Regular season and playoffs ===
| | | | Regular season | | | | | Playoffs |
| Season | Team | League | GP | G | A | Pts | PIM | GP | G | A | Pts | PIM |
|---|---|---|---|---|---|---|---|---|---|---|---|---|
| 2002–03 | VSV EC | AUT U20 | 13 | 6 | 4 | 10 | 4 | — | — | — | — | — |
| 2003–04 | VSV EC | AUT U20 | 23 | 32 | 5 | 37 | 58 | — | — | — | — | — |
| 2003–04 | VSV EC | EBEL | 14 | 2 | 1 | 3 | 0 | 4 | 1 | 0 | 1 | 0 |
| 2004–05 | Spokane Chiefs | WHL | 58 | 13 | 11 | 24 | 18 | — | — | — | — | — |
| 2005–06 | Spokane Chiefs | WHL | 67 | 36 | 14 | 50 | 28 | — | — | — | — | — |
| 2006–07 | Spokane Chiefs | WHL | 55 | 39 | 16 | 55 | 34 | 6 | 0 | 1 | 1 | 2 |
| 2006–07 | Manitoba Moose | AHL | 2 | 1 | 1 | 2 | 0 | 6 | 0 | 0 | 0 | 0 |
| 2007–08 | Manitoba Moose | AHL | 74 | 22 | 22 | 44 | 8 | 6 | 3 | 0 | 3 | 2 |
| 2008–09 | Manitoba Moose | AHL | 66 | 30 | 18 | 48 | 20 | 20 | 10 | 7 | 17 | 2 |
| 2009–10 | Manitoba Moose | AHL | 38 | 15 | 11 | 26 | 6 | — | — | — | — | — |
| 2009–10 | Vancouver Canucks | NHL | 20 | 5 | 6 | 11 | 8 | 9 | 1 | 0 | 1 | 0 |
| 2010–11 | New York Islanders | NHL | 76 | 34 | 18 | 52 | 10 | — | — | — | — | — |
| 2011–12 | New York Islanders | NHL | 78 | 20 | 12 | 32 | 12 | — | — | — | — | — |
| 2012–13 | VSV EC | EBEL | 17 | 10 | 9 | 19 | 2 | — | — | — | — | — |
| 2012–13 | New York Islanders | NHL | 45 | 16 | 5 | 21 | 12 | 6 | 1 | 3 | 4 | 0 |
| 2013–14 | New York Islanders | NHL | 64 | 12 | 14 | 26 | 12 | — | — | — | — | — |
| 2014–15 | New York Islanders | NHL | 34 | 8 | 5 | 13 | 4 | 2 | 0 | 1 | 1 | 2 |
| 2015–16 | Toronto Maple Leafs | NHL | 80 | 9 | 9 | 18 | 12 | — | — | — | — | — |
| 2016–17 | New York Rangers | NHL | 76 | 27 | 13 | 40 | 10 | 12 | 4 | 2 | 6 | 0 |
| 2017–18 | New York Rangers | NHL | 59 | 25 | 6 | 31 | 12 | — | — | — | — | — |
| 2017–18 | New Jersey Devils | NHL | 21 | 2 | 3 | 5 | 4 | 2 | 0 | 0 | 0 | 0 |
| 2018–19 | Arizona Coyotes | NHL | 41 | 9 | 7 | 16 | 8 | — | — | — | — | — |
| 2019–20 | Arizona Coyotes | NHL | 46 | 8 | 3 | 11 | 6 | 9 | 3 | 0 | 3 | 6 |
| NHL totals | | | 640 | 175 | 101 | 276 | 110 | 40 | 9 | 6 | 15 | 8 |

=== International ===
| Year | Team | Event | GP | G | A | Pts | PIM |
|---|---|---|---|---|---|---|---|
| 2004 | Austria | WJC18 Div I | 5 | 3 | 1 | 4 | 4 |
| 2005 | Austria | WJC-I | 4 | 1 | 2 | 3 | 2 |
| 2005 | Austria | WJC18 Div I | 4 | 4 | 1 | 5 | 29 |
| 2009 | Austria | OLYQ | 3 | 5 | 0 | 5 | 0 |
| 2012 | Austria | WC-IA | 5 | 0 | 4 | 4 | 0 |
| 2014 | Austria | OLY | 4 | 5 | 1 | 6 | 0 |
| 2016 | Austria | OLYQ | 3 | 1 | 0 | 1 | 0 |
| Junior totals | | | 13 | 8 | 4 | 12 | 35 |
| Senior totals | | | 15 | 11 | 5 | 16 | 0 |

== Awards and honours ==
| Award | Year |
WHL
| CHL/NHL Top Prospects Game | 2006 |
NHL
| Rookie of the Month (February) | 2011 |
| NHL All-Rookie Team | 2011 |

Awards and achievements
| Preceded by Luc Bourdon | Vancouver Canucks first-round draft pick 2006 | Succeeded by Patrick White |
