= Stefan Ulmer (ice hockey) =

Austrian ice hockey player

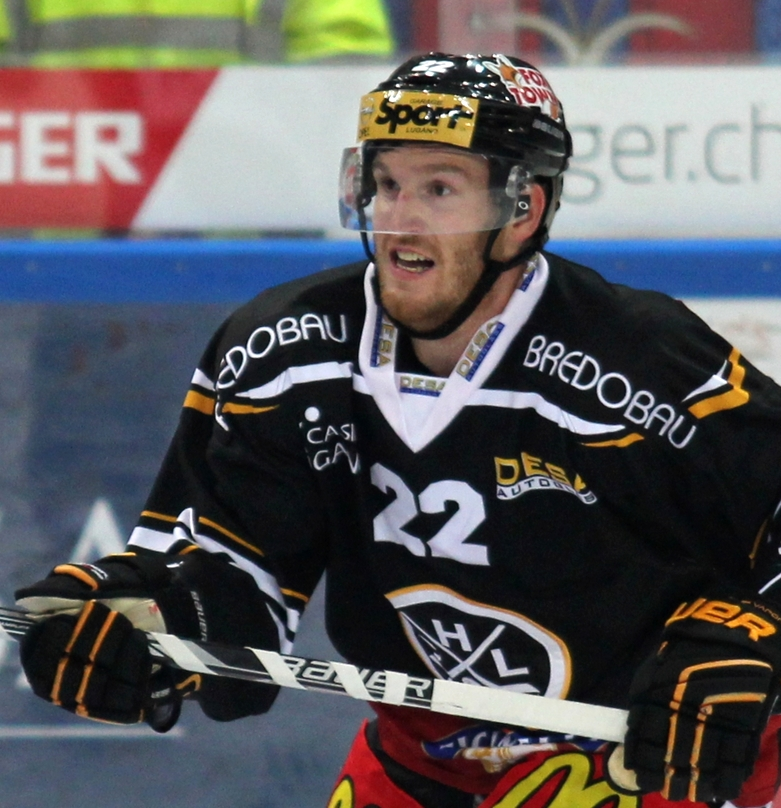
- Born: 1 December 1990 (age 35) Dornbirn, Austria
- Height: 5 ft 9 in (175 cm)
- Weight: 176 lb (80 kg; 12 st 8 lb)
- Position: Defence
- Shoots: Right
- SL team Former teams: HC La Chaux–de–Fonds; HC Lugano; EHC Biel
- National team: Austria
- NHL draft: Undrafted
- Playing career: 2007–present

Stefan Ulmer (born 1 December 1990) is an Austrian professional ice hockey defenceman currently playing for HC La Chaux–de–Fonds in the Swiss League (SL).

== Playing career ==
He began his professional career during the 2010–11 season, playing with HC Lugano of the Swiss National League A. Ulmer played his junior hockey in the Swiss junior leagues before embarking on a three-year stint (lasting from 2007 to 2010) with the Spokane Chiefs of the Western Hockey League, where he was a member of the team that won the 2008 Memorial Cup. He also made three appearances with the GCK Lions in the second-tier Swiss league, the National League B, during the 2006–07 season.

== International play ==
Ulmer was named to Team Austria's official 2014 Winter Olympics roster on 7 January 2014.

== Career statistics ==
=== Regular season and playoffs ===
			Regular season					Playoffs
Season	Team	League	GP	G	A	Pts	PIM	GP	G	A	Pts	PIM
2005–06	GCK Lions	SUI U20	41	2	3	5	35	—	—	—	—	—
2006–07	ZSC Lions	SUI.2 U20	6	2	2	4	10	—	—	—	—	—
2006–07	GCK Lions	SUI U20	32	2	10	12	12	8	0	5	5	8
2006–07	GCK Lions	NLB	3	0	0	0	2	1	0	0	0	0
2007–08	Spokane Chiefs	WHL	37	3	10	13	20	21	0	8	8	10
2008–09	Spokane Chiefs	WHL	63	8	32	40	44	12	2	1	3	4
2009–10	Spokane Chiefs	WHL	67	8	33	41	40	7	1	1	2	2
2010–11	HC Lugano	NLA	45	2	5	7	16	—	—	—	—	—
2011–12	HC Lugano	NLA	44	1	8	9	22	6	1	2	3	6
2012–13	HC Lugano	NLA	48	2	6	8	28	4	1	1	2	0
2013–14	HC Lugano	NLA	47	7	14	21	24	5	1	0	1	4
2014–15	HC Lugano	NLA	35	1	13	14	24	3	0	0	0	4
2015–16	HC Lugano	NLA	44	5	14	19	22	12	1	6	7	12
2016–17	HC Lugano	NLA	38	3	12	15	42	11	0	1	1	2
2017–18	HC Lugano	NL	19	0	3	3	6	18	1	4	5	14
2017–18	HCB Ticino Rockets	SL	1	0	0	0	0	—	—	—	—	—
2018–19	HC Lugano	NL	44	3	3	6	24	4	0	0	0	2
2019–20	EHC Biel	NL	31	1	2	3	12	—	—	—	—	—
2020–21	EHC Biel	NL	13	0	1	1	8	2	0	0	0	0
2020–21	HC La Chaux–de–Fonds	SL	7	1	4	5	34	2	1	0	1	0
2021–22	HC La Chaux–de–Fonds	SL	13	2	7	9	10	—	—	—	—	—
NL totals			408	25	81	106	228	65	5	14	19	44

=== International ===
Year	Team	Event	Result	GP	G	A	Pts	PIM
2006	Austria	WJC18 D1	19th	5	0	0	0	6
2007	Austria	WJC18 D1	20th	4	1	1	2	20
2008	Austria	WJC D1	12th	5	1	1	2	6
2009	Austria	WJC D1	12th	5	5	6	11	4
2010	Austria	WJC	10th	6	0	6	6	10
2012	Austria	WC D1A	12th	4	1	3	4	0
2014	Austria	OG	10th	4	0	0	0	0
2016	Austria	WC D1A	20th	5	0	2	2	8
2016	Austria	OGQ	DNQ	3	0	0	0	0
2017	Austria	WC D1A	17th	5	0	1	1	0
2018	Austria	WC	14th	7	0	1	1	2
2021	Austria	OGQ	DNQ	2	0	0	0	2
Junior totals				25	7	14	21	46
Senior totals				30	1	7	8	12
