= Johannes Reichel =

Austrian ice hockey player

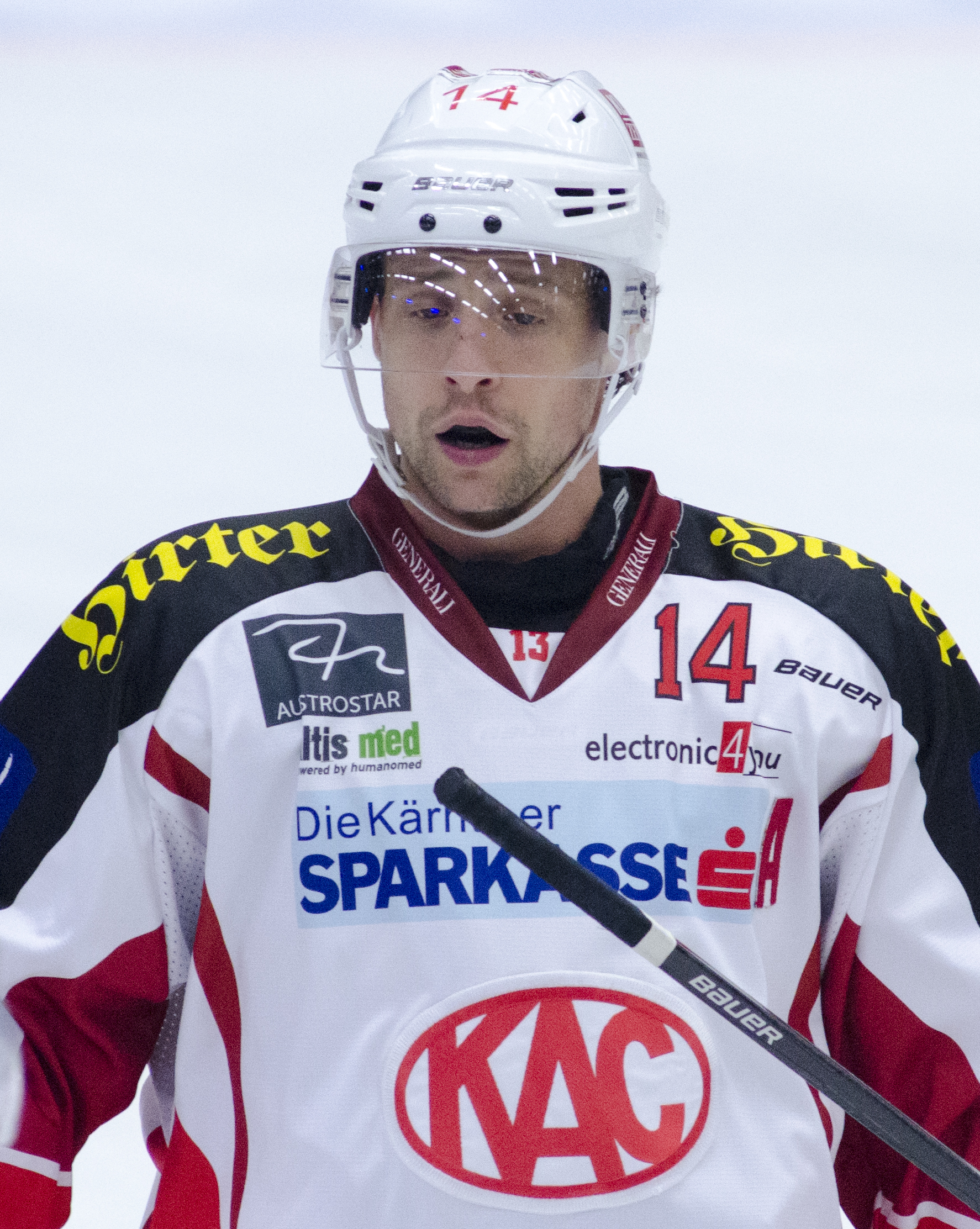
- Born: April 29, 1982 (age 42); Klagenfurt, Austria
- Height: 5 ft 11 in (180 cm)
- Weight: 187 lb (85 kg; 13 st 5 lb)
- Position: Defence
- Shoots: Left
- team Former teams: Free Agent; EC KAC; Rögle BK; HK 36 Skalica
- National team: Austria
- Playing career: 1999–present

Johannes Reichel (born April 29, 1982) is an Austrian professional ice hockey defenceman who is currently an unrestricted free agent who last played for HK 36 Skalica in the Slovak Extraliga (Slovak). On July 17, 2015, after Captaining the club in the 2014–15 season, Reichel was re-signed to a one-year extension with EC KAC. He participated at the 2011 IIHF World Championship as a member of the Austria men's national ice hockey team.
