= Manuel Geier =

Austrian ice hockey player

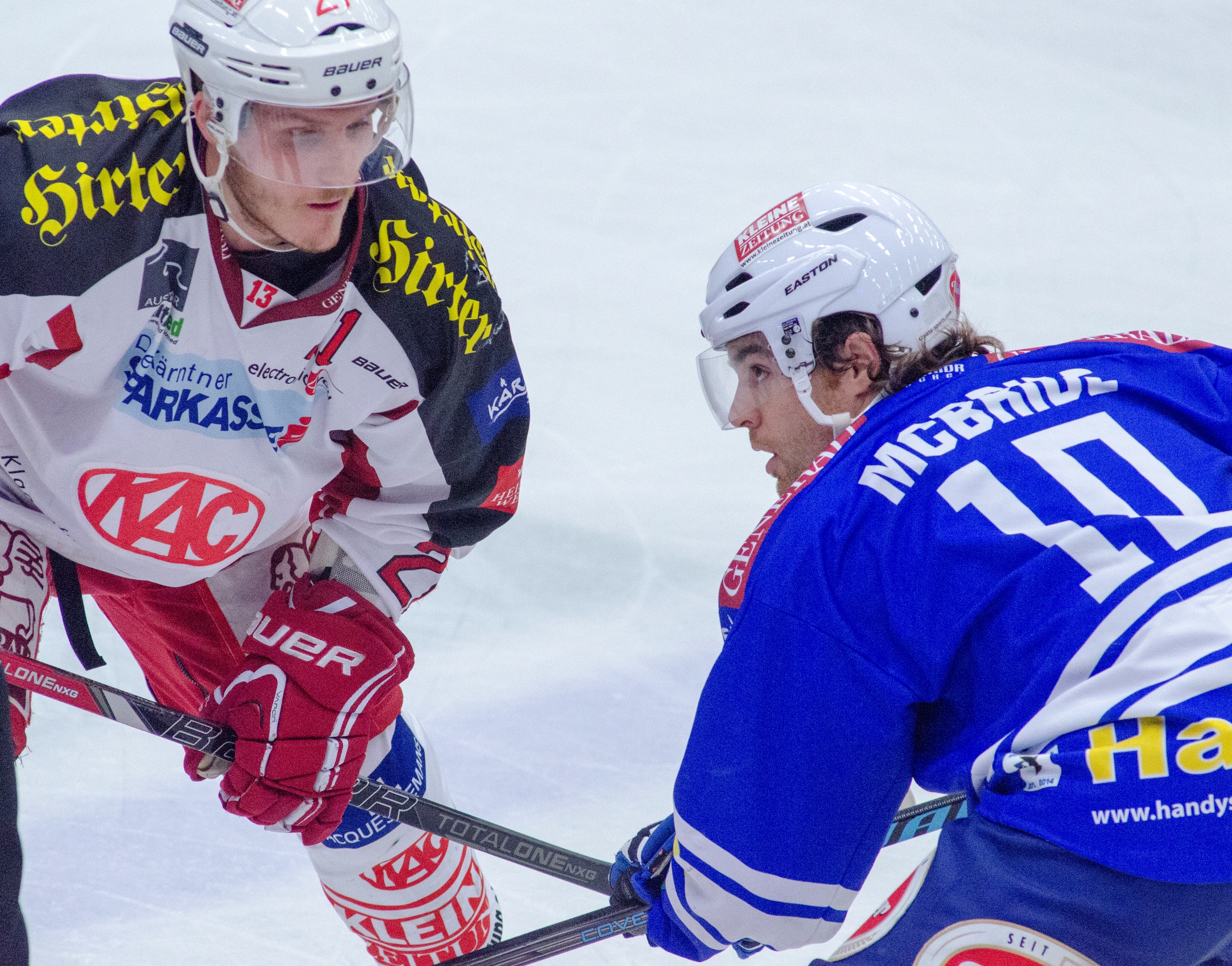
- Born: 8 January 1988 (age 38) Judenburg, Austria
- Height: 5 ft 10 in (178 cm)
- Weight: 187 lb (85 kg; 13 st 5 lb)
- Position: Forward
- Shoots: Left
- Aut.4 team Former teams: EC Wölfe Zeltweg; EC KAC
- National team: Austria
- Playing career: 2003–present

Manuel Geier (born 8 January 1988) is an Austrian professional ice hockey forward currently playing for EC Wölfe Zeltweg in the Austrian fourth tier (Aut.4).

Geier most notably played 13 seasons with EC KAC in the ICE Hockey League (ICEHL). He participated with the Austrian national team at the 2015 IIHF World Championship.
