= Ryo Tanaka =

Japanese ice hockey player

- Born: April 22, 1987 (age 38) Sapporo, Japan
- Height: 1.79 m (5 ft 10 in)
- Weight: 83 kg (183 lb; 13 st 1 lb)
- Position: Forward
- Shoots: Left
- ALIH team: Tohoku Free Blades
- National team: Japan
- Playing career: 2010–present

Ryo Tanaka (田中 遼, Tanaka Ryō; born April 22, 1987 in Sapporo, Hokkaido) is a Japanese professional ice hockey forward currently playing for the Tohoku Free Blades in the Asia League.

Tanaka has played for the Tohoku Free Blades since 2010. He previously played at university level for Meiji University. He has also played in the senior Japan national team since 2012.
