= Patrick Harand =

Austrian ice hockey player

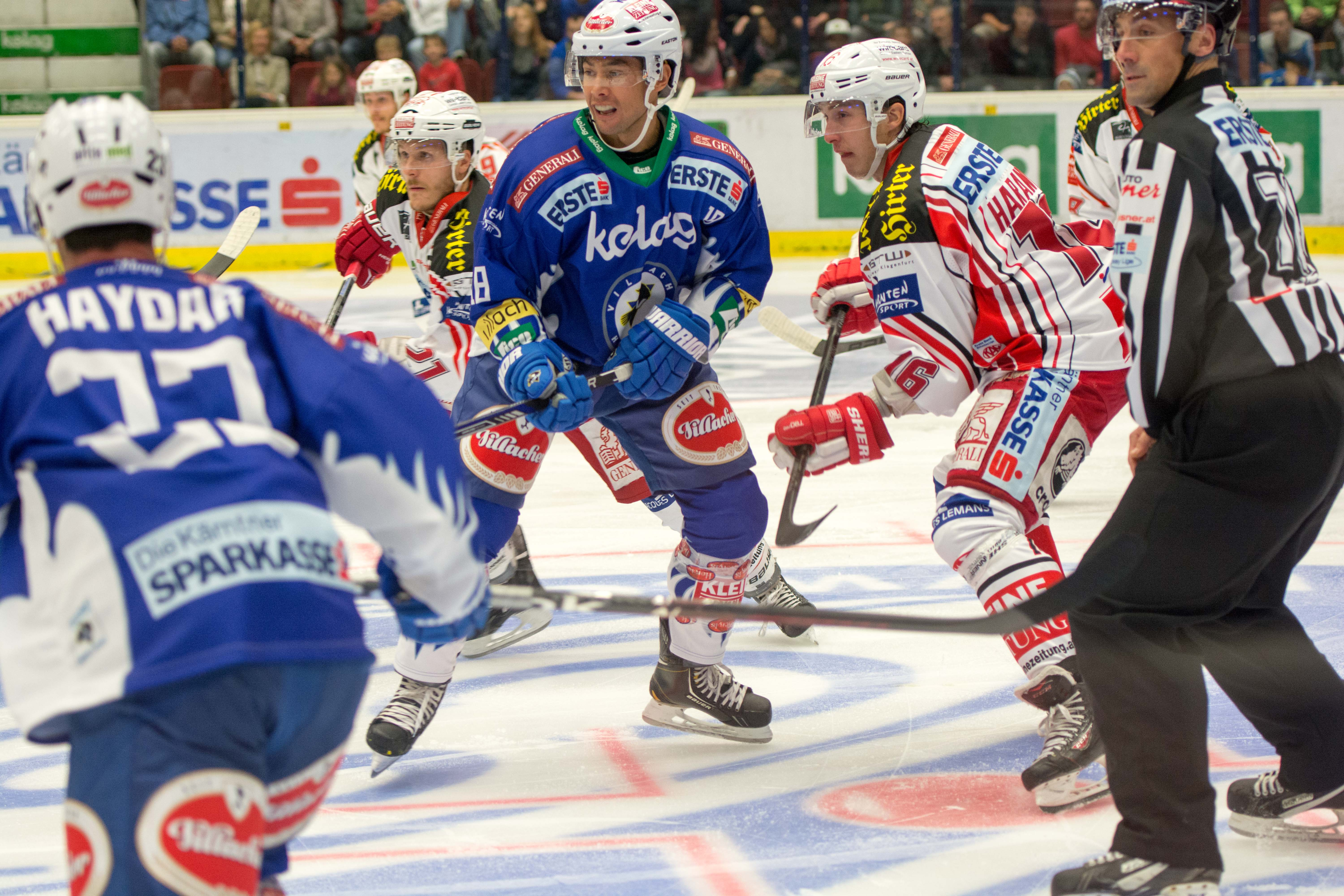
- Born: 15 March 1984 (age 41); Vienna, Austria
- Height: 6 ft 0 in (183 cm)
- Weight: 181 lb (82 kg; 12 st 13 lb)
- Position: Forward
- Shoots: Left
- Aut.4 team Former teams: Union EC Wien; EHC Lustenau; Vienna Capitals; EC Red Bull Salzburg; Graz 99ers EC KAC
- National team: Austria
- Playing career: 2000–present

Patrick Harand (born 15 March 1984) is an Austrian professional ice hockey player who is currently with Union EC Wien of the Austrian fourth tier (Aut.4). He predominately played in the Austrian Hockey League (EBEL/ICEHL). He participated at the 2011 IIHF World Championship as a member of the Austria men's national ice hockey team. He joined KAC from the Graz 99ers as a free agent on 5 April 2012.
