= Kohei Mitamura =

Japanese ice hockey player

- Born: February 19, 1992 (age 34) Obihiro, Hokkaidō, Japan
- Height: 5 ft 9 in (175 cm)
- Weight: 172 lb (78 kg; 12 st 4 lb)
- Position: Forward
- Shoots: Left
- ALIH team: Oji Eagles
- National team: Japan
- Playing career: 2010–present

Kohei Mitamura (三田村 康平, Mitamura Kōhei), born February 19, 1992, is a Japanese professional ice hockey forward playing for the Oji Eagles of the Asia League.

Since 2010 he plays for the Oji Eagles. He previously played at amateur level for the Shirakaba Gakuen team. He also plays in the senior Japan national team since 2012.
