= 2013–14 Austrian Hockey League season =

2013–14 Erste Bank Eishockey Liga
- League: Erste Bank Eishockey Liga
- Sport: Ice hockey

Regular season
- Top scorer: Derek Ryan
- Finals champions: HC Bolzano

Austrian Hockey League seasons
- 2012–13 season 2014–15 season

The 2013–14 Austrian Hockey League was a season of the Austrian Hockey League. HC Bolzano defeated EC Red Bull Salzburg in the Championship. As HC Bolzano was from Italy, Red Bull Salzburg was recognized as Austrian champions, while Bolzano was recognized as the overall EBEL winners.

== First round ==
Rank	Team	GP	W	L	OTW	OTL	SOW	SOL	Goals	Diff.	Pts
1	Vienna Capitals	44	30	14	3	1	1	1	160:103	+54	62
2	EHC Liwest Linz	44	30	14	4	2	1	0	150:119	+41	62
3	EC Red Bull Salzburg	44	29	15	1	2	1	1	152:107	+45	61
4	HC Bolzano	44	25	19	0	2	1	5	135:126	+9	57
5	Orli Znojmo	44	25	19	2	3	1	3	144:122	+22	56
6	EC VSV	44	26	18	2	0	1	2	164:139	+25	54
7	EC KAC	44	22	22	3	2	6	2	119:130	-11	48
8	Dornbirner EC	44	21	23	4	2	4	2	144:151	-7	46
9	Graz 99ers	44	19	25	2	2	2	5	110:127	-17	45
10	Alba Volán Székesfehérvár	44	18	26	4	5	2	2	119:147	-28	43
11	HC TWK Innsbruck	44	10	34	1	4	2	0	106:181	-75	24
12	HDD Olimpija Ljubljana	44	9	35	1	2	2	1	98:159	-61	21

== Second round ==
=== Final round ===
Rank	Team	GP	W	L	OTW	OTL	SOW	SOL	Goals	Diff.	Pts (Bonus)
1.	EC Red Bull Salzburg	10	8	2	2	0	0	1	36:18	+18	19 (2)
2.	HC Bolzano	10	6	4	0	1	2	0	27:22	+5	14 (1)
3.	Vienna Capitals	10	4	6	1	0	1	1	23:32	-9	13 (4)
4.	Orli Znojmo	10	5	5	0	1	0	1	32:26	+6	12 (0)
5.	EC VSV	10	4	6	1	2	0	0	31:35	-4	10 (0)
6.	EHC Linz	10	3	7	0	0	0	0	18:34	-16	9 (3)

=== Qualification round ===
Rank	Team	GP	W	L	OTW	OTL	SOW	SOL	Goals	Diff.	Pts (Bonus)
1.	Alba Volán Szekésféhervár	10	8	2	0	0	0	0	32:21	+11	17 (1)
2.	Dornbirner EC	10	6	4	2	0	0	0	33:27	+6	15 (3)
3.	EC KAC	10	5	5	0	1	0	0	33:22	+11	15 (4)
4.	EC Graz 99ers	10	5	5	1	1	0	0	34:32	+2	13 (2)
5.	HDD Olimpija Ljubljana	10	4	6	0	0	0	0	30:37	-7	8 (0)
6.	HC TWK Innsbruck	10	2	8	0	1	0	0	19:42	-23	5 (0)

== Playoffs ==
Quarterfinals
PL1	EC Red Bull Salzburg	4
QU2	Dornbirner EC	2
PL4	Orli Znojmo	1
PL6	EHC Linz	4
PL2	HC Bolzano	4
QU1	Alba Volán Székesfehérvár	0
PL3	Vienna Capitals	1
PL5	EC VSV	4

Semifinals
PL1	EC Red Bull Salzburg	3
PL6	EHC Linz	0
PL2	HC Bolzano	3
PL5	EC VSV	1

Finals
PL1	EC Red Bull Salzburg	2
PL2	HC Bolzano	3
