= 2012–13 Austrian Hockey League season =

2012–13 Erste Bank Eishockey Liga
- League: Erste Bank Eishockey Liga
- Sport: Ice hockey
- Teams: 11

Regular season
- Winners: Vienna Capitals
- Top scorer: Luciano Aquino
- Finals champions: Klagenfurter AC
- Runners-up: Vienna Capitals

Austrian Hockey League seasons
- 2011–12 season 2013–14 season

The 2012–13 Austrian Hockey League was a season of the Austrian Hockey League (known as Erste Bank Eishockey Liga - or EBEL league - for sponsorship reasons). The Klagenfurter AC won the Austrian championship by defeating the Vienna Capitals in the Playoff Final.

== First round ==
R	Team	GP	W	OTL	L	GF	GA	Diff	Pts
1	(Austria) Vienna Capitals	44	28	5	16	137	100	+37	61
2	(Croatia) KHL Medveščak Zagreb	44	27	6	11	145	109	+36	60
3	(Austria) Graz 99ers	44	24	8	14	142	130	+12	56
4	(Austria) EC VSV	44	26	4	14	171	138	+33	56
5	(Austria) EC KAC	44	26	3	15	140	127	+13	55
6	(Austria) EHC Linz	44	26	1	17	154	135	+19	53
7	(Czech Republic) Orli Znojmo	44	23	6	15	149	136	+13	52
8	(Austria) EC Red Bull Salzburg	44	22	3	19	163	121	+42	47
9	(Hungary) Alba Volán Székesfehérvár	44	21	3	20	127	138	–11	45
10	(Slovenia) HDD Olimpija Ljubljana	44	20	3	21	123	145	–22	43
11	(Austria) Dornbirner EC	44	13	3	28	128	183	–55	29
12	(Austria) HC Innsbruck	44	8	3	33	94	211	–117	19

== Second round ==
=== Final round ===
R	Team	GP	W	OTL	L	GF-GA	Diff	Pts
1	(Austria) Vienna Capitals	10	7	2	1	27-21	+6	18 (4)
2	(Austria) EHC Linz	10	8	1	1	42-29	+13	17 (0)
3	(Austria) EC KAC	10	5	3	2	27-26	+1	13 (0)
4	(Croatia) KHL Medveščak Zagreb	10	4	2	4	30-31	–1	13 (3)
5	(Austria) Graz 99ers	10	3	1	6	20-27	–7	9 (2)
6	(Austria) EC VSV	10	3	1	6	21-33	–12	8 (1)

=== Qualification round ===
R	Team	GP	W	OTL	L	GF-GA	Diff	Pts
7	(Czech Republic) Orli Znojmo	10	8	0	2	42-18	+24	20 (4)
8	(Austria) EC Red Bull Salzburg	10	7	0	3	35-26	+9	17 (3)
9	(Slovenia) HDD Olimpija Ljubljana	10	5	1	4	27-26	+1	12 (1)
10	(Austria) Dornbirner EC	10	5	1	4	26-36	–10	11 (1)
11	(Hungary) Alba Volán Székesfehérvár	10	3	0	7	26-34	–8	8 (2)
12	(Austria) HC Innsbruck	10	2	0	8	26-42	–16	4 (0)

== Playoffs ==
Quarterfinals
PL1	Vienna Capitals	4
QU1	Orli Znojmo	1
PL4	KHL Medveščak Zagreb	2
QU2	EC Red Bull Salzburg	4
PL3	EC KAC	4
PL5	Graz 99ers	1
PL2	EHC Linz	4
PL6	EC VSV	3

Semifinals
PL1	Vienna Capitals	4
QU2	EC Red Bull Salzburg	2
PL2	EHC Linz	2
PL3	EC KAC	4

Finals
PL1	Vienna Capitals	0
PL3	EC KAC	4
