= 2014–15 Austrian Hockey League season =

2014–15 Erste Bank Eishockey Liga
- League: Erste Bank Eishockey Liga
- Sport: Ice hockey
- Teams: 12

Regular season
- Season champions: EC Red Bull Salzburg
- Finals champions: EC Red Bull Salzburg

Austrian Hockey League seasons
- 2013–14 season 2015–16 season

The 2014–15 Austrian Hockey League was a season of the Austrian Hockey League. HC Bolzano were the defending Champions after defeating EC Red Bull Salzburg in the 2014 Championship. In the conclusion to the season, EC Red Bull Salzburg won the double in the League standings and the Championship.

== First round ==
=== Regular season standings ===
Team	Wins	Losses	Overtime Losses
EC Red Bull Salzburg	30	9	5
EHC Linz	28	13	3
EC VSV	26	17	1
Vienna Capitals	24	16	4
Orli Znojmo	24	16	4
Székesfehérvár	25	18	1
HC Bolzano	21	21	2
EC KAC	17	19	8
Graz 99ers	18	21	5
Dornbirner EC	19	23	2
HC TWK Innsbruck	16	23	5
Olimpija Ljubljana	16	26	2

== Second round ==
=== Final round standings ===
Rank	Team	GP	W	L	OTW	OTL	SOW	SOL	Goals	Diff.	Pts (Bonus)
1.	EC Red Bull Salzburg	10	6	2	2	0	0	0	35:25	+10	20 (4)
2.	EHC Linz	10	7	3	0	0	0	0	34:24	+10	17 (3)
3.	Orli Znojmo	10	4	3	3	0	0	0	33:23	+10	14 (0)
4.	Alba Volán Szekésféhervár	10	4	4	2	0	0	0	23:22	+1	12 (0)
5.	Vienna Capitals	10	2	5	0	3	0	0	20:33	-13	8 (1)
6.	EC VSV	10	0	6	0	4	0	0	11:29	-18	6 (2)

=== Qualification round standings ===
Rank	Team	GP	W	L	OTW	OTL	SOW	SOL	Goals	Diff.	Pts (Bonus)
1.	HC Bolzano	10	6	2	1	1	0	0	37:25	+12	19 (4)
2.	EC KAC	10	7	3	0	0	0	0	34:18	+16	17 (3)
3.	EC Graz 99ers	10	5	2	1	2	0	0	27:20	+7	16 (2)
4.	Dornbirner EC	10	4	3	1	2	0	0	25:23	+2	13 (1)
5.	HC TWK Innsbruck	10	2	6	2	0	0	0	30:37	-7	8 (0)
6.	HDD Olimpija Ljubljana	10	1	9	0	0	0	0	11:34	-23	2 (0)

== Playoffs ==
Quarterfinals
PL1	EC Red Bull Salzburg	4
PL6	EC VSV	1
PL3	Orli Znojmo	1
QU2	EC KAC	4
PL5	Vienna Capitals	4
PL4	Alba Volán Székesfehérvár	2
QU1	HC Bolzano	3
PL2	EHC Linz	4

Semifinals
PL1	EC Red Bull Salzburg	4
QU2	EC KAC	0
PL5	Vienna Capitals	4
PL2	EHC Linz	1

Finals
PL1	EC Red Bull Salzburg	4
PL5	Vienna Capitals	0
