= Wolfgang Kromp =

Austrian ice hockey player

Personal information
- Nationality: Austrian
- Born: 17 September 1970 (age 55) Villach, Austria

Sport
- Sport: Ice hockey

Wolfgang Kromp (born 17 September 1970) is an Austrian ice hockey player. He competed in the men's tournaments at the 1994 Winter Olympics, the 1998 Winter Olympics and the 2002 Winter Olympics.

== Career statistics ==
=== Regular season and playoffs ===
| | | | Regular season | | | | | Playoffs |
| Season | Team | League | GP | G | A | Pts | PIM | GP | G | A | Pts | PIM |
|---|---|---|---|---|---|---|---|---|---|---|---|---|
| 1988–89 | EC VSV | AUT | 2 | 0 | 1 | 1 | 0 | — | — | — | — | — |
| 1989–90 | EC VSV | AUT | 37 | 3 | 3 | 6 | 14 | — | — | — | — | — |
| 1990–91 | EC VSV | AUT | 42 | 4 | 10 | 14 | | — | — | — | — | — |
| 1991–92 | EC VSV | AUT | 42 | 10 | 18 | 28 | 12 | — | — | — | — | — |
| 1992–93 | EC VSV | AUT | 54 | 14 | 20 | 34 | | — | — | — | — | — |
| 1993–94 | EC VSV | AUT | 49 | 20 | 19 | 39 | | — | — | — | — | — |
| 1994–95 | EC VSV | AUT | 34 | 15 | 10 | 25 | | — | — | — | — | — |
| 1995–96 | EC VSV | AUT | 34 | 15 | 27 | 42 | 57 | — | — | — | — | — |
| 1996–97 | EC VSV | AUT | 47 | 35 | 15 | 50 | 74 | — | — | — | — | — |
| 1997–98 | EC VSV | AUT | 42 | 17 | 14 | 31 | 47 | — | — | — | — | — |
| 1998–99 | EC VSV | AUT | 56 | 22 | 25 | 47 | 42 | — | — | — | — | — |
| 1999–2000 | EC VSV | IEHL | 33 | 17 | 17 | 34 | 50 | — | — | — | — | — |
| 1999–2000 | EC VSV | AUT | 15 | 11 | 9 | 20 | 6 | — | — | — | — | — |
| 2000–01 | EC VSV | AUT | 46 | 32 | 37 | 69 | 92 | — | — | — | — | — |
| 2001–02 | EC VSV | AUT | 32 | 21 | 14 | 35 | 26 | 16 | 10 | 12 | 22 | 33 |
| 2002–03 | EC VSV | AUT | 36 | 15 | 13 | 28 | 10 | 13 | 7 | 7 | 14 | 10 |
| 2003–04 | EC VSV | AUT | 46 | 23 | 17 | 40 | 51 | 8 | 3 | 4 | 7 | 4 |
| 2004–05 | EC VSV | AUT | 36 | 2 | 10 | 12 | 24 | — | — | — | — | — |
| 2005–06 | EC VSV | AUT | 39 | 10 | 10 | 20 | 28 | 13 | 3 | 6 | 9 | 18 |
| 2006–07 | EC VSV | AUT | 34 | 8 | 17 | 25 | 18 | 8 | 2 | 4 | 6 | 4 |
| 2007–08 | EC VSV | AUT | 43 | 5 | 11 | 16 | 28 | 5 | 1 | 0 | 1 | 0 |
| 2008–09 | EC VSV | AUT | 39 | 2 | 10 | 12 | 24 | 2 | 0 | 0 | 0 | 4 |
| 2009–10 | EC VSV | AUT | 42 | 5 | 7 | 12 | 40 | 5 | 1 | 1 | 2 | 2 |
| 2010–11 | EC SV Spittal | AUT.4 |
| AUT totals | | | 847 | 289 | 317 | 606 | 593 | 70 | 27 | 34 | 61 | 75 |

=== International ===
| Year | Team | Event | GP | G | A | Pts | PIM |
|---|---|---|---|---|---|---|---|
| 1989 | Austria | WJC C | 4 | 0 | 0 | 0 | 2 |
| 1990 | Austria | WJC B | 7 | 3 | 1 | 4 | 34 |
| 1993 | Austria | WC | 6 | 0 | 0 | 0 | 2 |
| 1994 | Austria | OG | 7 | 0 | 1 | 1 | 2 |
| 1994 | Austria | WC | 6 | 0 | 1 | 1 | 2 |
| 1997 | Austria | OGQ | 4 | 1 | 0 | 1 | 2 |
| 1998 | Austria | OG | 4 | 1 | 0 | 1 | 4 |
| 1998 | Austria | WC | 3 | 0 | 0 | 0 | 0 |
| 2000 | Austria | WC | 6 | 0 | 0 | 0 | 0 |
| 2001 | Austria | OGQ | 3 | 2 | 0 | 2 | 0 |
| 2001 | Austria | WC | 6 | 0 | 1 | 1 | 2 |
| 2002 | Austria | OG | 4 | 0 | 1 | 1 | 4 |
| Junior totals | | | 11 | 3 | 1 | 4 | 36 |
| Senior totals | | | 49 | 4 | 4 | 8 | 18 |

"Wolfgang Kromp". Elite Prospects.
