= Herbert Hohenberger =

Austrian ice hockey player

- Born: 8 February 1969 (age 57) Villach, Austria
- Height: 6 ft 0 in (183 cm)
- Weight: 194 lb (88 kg; 13 st 12 lb)
- Position: Defense
- Shot: Right
- Played for: Villacher SV; Peoria Rivermen; Sherbrooke Canadiens; Kölner Haie; Augsburger Panther; HC Innsbruck
- National team: Austria
- NHL draft: Undrafted
- Playing career: 1984–2011

Herbert Hohenberger (born 8 February 1969) is an Austrian ice hockey player. He competed in the men's tournaments at the 1994 Winter Olympics and the 1998 Winter Olympics.

== Career statistics ==
=== Regular season and playoffs ===
			Regular season					Playoffs
Season	Team	League	GP	G	A	Pts	PIM	GP	G	A	Pts	PIM
1984–85	EC VSV	Austria	—	—	—	—	—	—	—	—	—	—
1985–86	EC VSV	Austria	3	2	0	2	0	—	—	—	—	—
1986–87	Hull Olympiques	QMJHL	60	20	23	43	105	8	3	3	6	12
1987–88	Hull Olympiques	QMJHL	60	21	39	60	94	19	5	11	16	34
1988–89	EC VSV	Austria	44	18	22	42	140	—	—	—	—	—
1989–90	Hull Olympiques	QMJHL	65	16	50	66	125	11	3	7	10	10
1989–90	Sherbrooke Canadiens	AHL	—	—	—	—	—	4	1	0	1	6
1990–91	Fredericton Canadiens	AHL	38	4	11	15	47	—	—	—	—	—
1990–91	Peoria Rivermen	IHL	27	2	7	9	17	10	0	1	1	6
1991–92	EC VSV	Austria	46	21	41	62	73	—	—	—	—	—
1992–93	EC VSV	Austria	54	17	37	54	104	—	—	—	—	—
1993–94	EC VSV	Austria	51	20	38	58	149	—	—	—	—	—
1994–95	Kölner Haie	DEL	36	8	23	31	60	15	5	9	14	24
1995–96	Kölner Haie	DEL	47	8	31	39	85	14	6	8	14	47
1996–97	Kölner Haie	DEL	50	13	30	43	52	4	1	4	5	2
1997–98	Kölner Haie	DEL	31	2	2	4	18	3	0	0	0	6
1998–99	EC VSV	Austria	52	12	39	51	103	—	—	—	—	—
1999–2000	EC VSV	IEHL	33	10	21	31	55	—	—	—	—	—
1999–2000	EC VSV	Austria	15	6	9	15	16	—	—	—	—	—
2000–01	Augsburger Panther	DEL	60	5	17	22	76	—	—	—	—	—
2001–02	EC VSV	Austria	17	2	8	10	86	11	6	3	9	41
2002–03	EC VSV	Austria	37	9	15	24	64	13	3	2	5	22
2003–04	EC VSV	EBEL	44	12	29	41	92	8	1	5	6	10
2004–05	EC VSV	EBEL	35	9	16	25	62	3	0	1	1	8
2005–06	EC VSV	EBEL	46	10	25	35	74	12	0	9	9	12
2006–07	EC VSV	EBEL	39	3	22	25	79	8	1	5	6	16
2007–08	HC TWK Innsbruck	EBEL	40	3	14	17	56	3	0	1	1	2
2008–09	HC TWK Innsbruck	EBEL	44	7	16	23	92	2	0	0	0	0
2009–10	HC TWK Innsbruck	AUT.2	30	4	11	15	103	7	1	2	3	10
2010–11	HC Innsbruck II	AUT.4	3	0	0	0	4	—	—	—	—	—
Austria/EBEL totals			667	151	331	482	1190	60	11	26	37	111
DEL totals			224	36	103	139	291	36	12	21	33	79

=== International ===
Year	Team	Event	GP	G	A	Pts	PIM
1989	Austria	WC B	7	1	3	4	14
1992	Austria	WC B	7	4	12	16	18
1993	Austria	WC	6	2	1	3	8
1994	Austria	OG	7	0	0	0	16
1994	Austria	WC	6	1	2	3	12
1995	Austria	WC	7	0	5	5	10
1996	Austria	WC	7	0	2	2	8
1997	Austria	OGQ	4	1	1	2	29
1997	Austria	WC B	7	2	2	4	10
1998	Austria	OG	4	0	0	0	4
1998	Austria	WC	3	0	0	0	2
1999	Austria	WC	3	0	0	0	2
2000	Austria	WC	6	0	2	2	18
2001	Austria	OGQ	3	1	3	4	4
2001	Austria	WC	6	0	0	0	6
2002	Austria	WC	6	1	2	3	18
2003	Austria	WC	4	0	0	0	2
Senior totals			93	13	35	48	181
