= Dieter Kalt =

Austrian ice hockey player

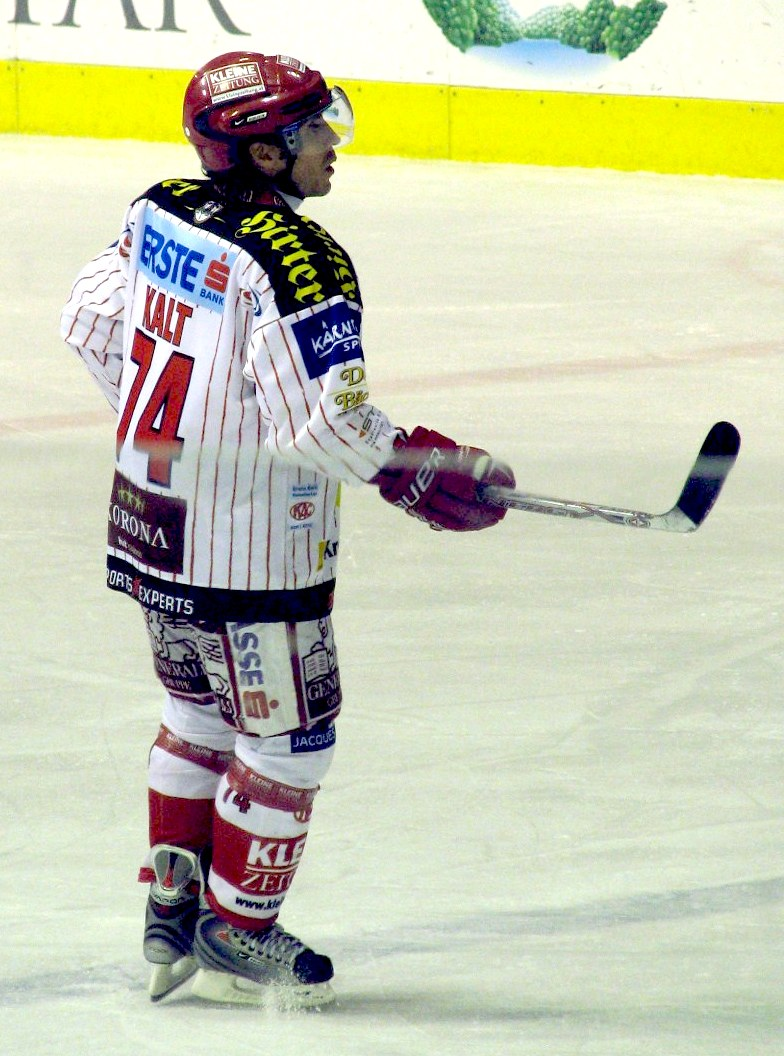
- Born: 26 June 1974 (age 51) Klagenfurt, Austria
- Height: 5 ft 9 in (175 cm)
- Weight: 183 lb (83 kg; 13 st 1 lb)
- Position: Right wing
- Shot: Right
- Played for: EC KAC; Adler Mannheim; Long Beach Ice Dogs; Kölner Haie; Färjestad BK; Vienna Capitals; EC Red Bull Salzburg; Luleå HF
- National team: Austria
- Playing career: 1990–2012

Dieter Kalt Jr. (born 26 June 1974) is an Austrian former professional ice hockey player. Kalt was the director of player development with EC KAC before leaving in 2018. He most notably played for Klagenfurt AC in the Erste Bank Hockey League, his hometown club, following the footsteps of club legend and father Dieter Kalt Sr.

== Playing career ==
Before joining Red Bull Salzburg EC has he played for Vienna Capitals (EBHL), Färjestads BK (Swedish Elite League), Kölner Haie (DEL), Long Beach Ice Dogs (IHL), Klagenfurt AC (EBHL), Adler Mannheim (DEL) and Luleå HF of the Elitserien.

He has represented Austria in fourteen World Championships, including 2007 and three Olympic Games, 1994, 1998 and 2002.

In 2013, Kalt was named the head coach of the Austria men's national junior ice hockey team. He was the director of player development with EC KAC before leaving in 2018.

== Personal life ==
Kalt's father, Dieter Kalt Sr., served as president for the Austrian Ice Hockey Federation and was inducted into the IIHF Hall of Fame as a builder in 2017.

== Career statistics ==
=== Regular season and playoffs ===
			Regular season					Playoffs
Season	Team	League	GP	G	A	Pts	PIM	GP	G	A	Pts	PIM
1990–91	EC KAC	AUT	18	1	1	2		—	—	—	—	—
1991–92	EC KAC	AUT	37	5	4	9		—	—	—	—	—
1992–93	EC KAC	AUT	45	10	14	24		—	—	—	—	—
1993–94	EC KAC	AUT	47	22	23	45	32	—	—	—	—	—
1994–95	EC KAC	AUT	34	23	22	45	28	—	—	—	—	—
1995–96	EC KAC	AUT	38	34	28	62	14	—	—	—	—	—
1996–97	Adler Mannheim	DEL	49	14	20	34	20	9	3	4	7	4
1997–98	Adler Mannheim	DEL	43	18	13	31	38	10	2	2	4	0
1998–99	EC KAC	AUT	50	27	32	59	52	—	—	—	—	—
1999–2000	Long Beach Ice Dogs	IHL	54	11	14	25	20	—	—	—	—	—
1999–2000	EC KAC	AUT	11	4	7	11	10	—	—	—	—	—
2000–01	Kölner Haie	DEL	36	11	10	21	25	3	2	0	2	2
2001–02	Färjestad BK	SEL	49	21	18	39	43	10	6	3	9	6
2002–03	Färjestad BK	SEL	49	18	14	32	59	14	4	1	5	10
2003–04	Färjestad BK	SEL	45	2	9	11	26	17	2	0	2	12
2004–05	Vienna Capitals	AUT	48	24	30	54	40	10	6	4	10	18
2005–06	EC Salzburg	AUT	40	25	18	43	48	11	3	4	7	18
2006–07	EC Salzburg	AUT	50	24	33	57	20	8	3	5	8	10
2007–08	EC Salzburg	AUT	43	22	16	38	46	14	5	10	15	6
2008–09	EC Salzburg	AUT	32	9	16	25	36	—	—	—	—	—
2008–09	Luleå HF	SEL	7	2	0	2	4	5	0	0	0	2
2009–10	EC KAC	AUT	50	14	18	32	38	6	3	4	7	4
2010–11	EC KAC	AUT	42	16	18	34	32	16	3	3	6	8
2011–12	EC KAC	AUT	42	4	17	21	16	16	3	5	8	10
AUT totals			627	264	297	561	412	81	26	35	61	74
DEL totals			128	43	43	86	83	22	7	6	13	6
SEL totals			150	43	41	84	132	46	12	4	16	30

=== International ===
Year	Team	Event	GP	G	A	Pts	PIM
1990	Austria	EJC B	7	1	2	3	6
1991	Austria	WJC B	7	3	1	4	2
1991	Austria	EJC B	5	8	3	11	6
1992	Austria	WJC B	7	4	1	5	2
1992	Austria	EJC B	5	1	2	3	8
1993	Austria	WJC B	7	6	3	9	4
1993	Austria	WC	6	0	0	0	0
1994	Austria	WJC B	7	1	6	7	12
1994	Austria	OG	7	0	0	0	6
1994	Austria	WC	6	4	0	4	0
1995	Austria	WC	7	4	1	5	4
1996	Austria	WC	7	1	1	2	4
1997	Austria	OGQ	4	0	1	1	4
1997	Austria	WC B	7	1	1	2	2
1998	Austria	OG	4	0	1	1	2
1998	Austria	WC	3	1	0	1	0
1999	Austria	WC	6	0	3	3	2
2000	Austria	WC	6	3	1	4	2
2001	Austria	WC	6	1	2	3	2
2002	Austria	OG	4	1	0	1	6
2002	Austria	WC	6	5	1	6	4
2003	Austria	WC	5	1	0	1	2
2004	Austria	WC	5	1	1	2	6
2005	Austria	OGQ	3	1	0	1	0
2005	Austria	WC	6	0	2	2	2
2006	Austria	WC D1	5	0	5	5	10
2007	Austria	WC	6	1	0	1	6
2008	Austria	WC D1	5	5	6	11	0
2009	Austria	OGQ	3	1	1	2	2
Junior totals			45	24	18	42	40
Senior totals			117	31	27	58	66
