= Gerhard Unterluggauer =

Austrian ice hockey player

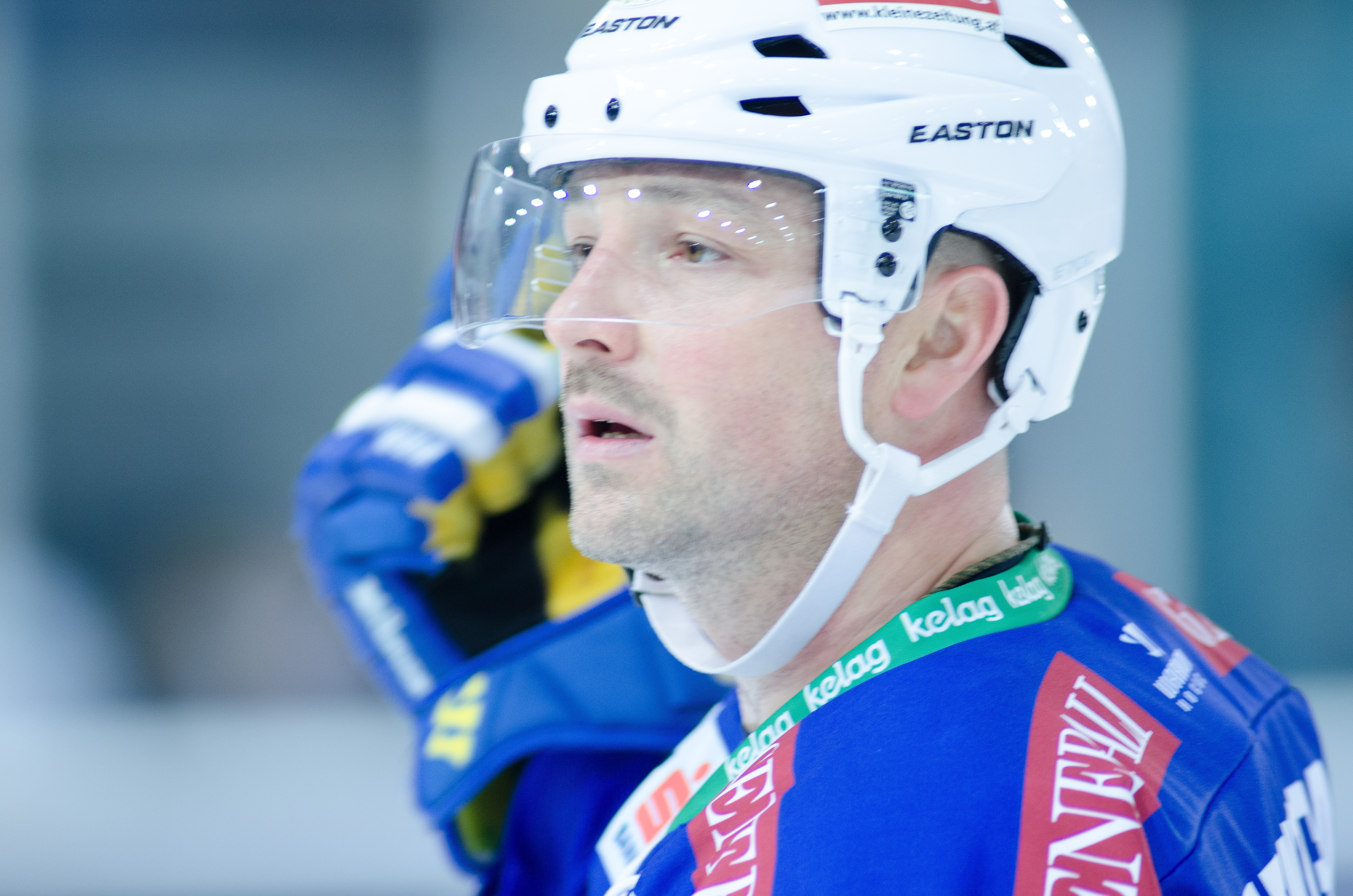
- Born: August 15, 1976 (age 49) Villach, Austria
- Height: 5 ft 10 in (178 cm)
- Weight: 194 lb (88 kg; 13 st 12 lb)
- Position: Defence
- Shot: Left
- Played for: EC VSV; Schwenninger Wild Wings; DEG Metro Stars; HC TWK Innsbruck
- National team: Austria
- NHL draft: Undrafted
- Playing career: 1992–2016

Gerhard Unterluggauer (born August 15, 1976) is an Austrian former professional ice hockey defenceman who Captained EC VSV in the Austrian Hockey League (EBEL). He participated at the 2011 IIHF World Championship as a member of the Austria men's national ice hockey team. He also competed at the 1998 Winter Olympics, the 2002 Winter Olympics and the 2014 Winter Olympics.

== Career statistics ==
=== Regular season and playoffs ===
			Regular season					Playoffs
Season	Team	League	GP	G	A	Pts	PIM	GP	G	A	Pts	PIM
1992–93	EC VSV	AUT	10	0	0	0		—	—	—	—	—
1993–94	EC VSV	AUT	47	4	3	7		—	—	—	—	—
1994–95	EC VSV	AUT	34	6	11	17		—	—	—	—	—
1995–96	Brandon Wheat Kings	WHL	28	5	11	16	55	—	—	—	—	—
1996–97	Brandon Wheat Kings	WHL	59	9	48	57	50	6	2	3	5	2
1997–98	EC VSV	AUT	42	9	15	24	52	—	—	—	—	—
1998–99	EC VSV	AUT	54	9	29	38	40	—	—	—	—	—
1999–2000	EC VSV	IEHL	33	9	13	22	32	—	—	—	—	—
1999–2000	EC VSV	AUT	15	3	3	6	8	—	—	—	—	—
2000–01	EC VSV	AUT	50	17	42	59	82	—	—	—	—	—
2001–02	SERC Wild Wings	DEL	60	4	9	13	52	—	—	—	—	—
2002–03	DEG Metro Stars	DEL	52	4	12	16	42	5	1	0	1	2
2003–04	DEG Metro Stars	DEL	51	3	8	11	38	4	0	0	0	2
2004–05	HC TWK Innsbruck	AUT	47	14	31	45	56	5	0	6	6	0
2005–06	HC TWK Innsbruck	AUT	48	13	30	43	91	7	5	2	7	4
2006–07	HC TWK Innsbruck	AUT	55	8	37	45	70	—	—	—	—	—
2007–08	HC TWK Innsbruck	AUT	38	7	18	25	32	3	0	1	1	2
2008–09	HC TWK Innsbruck	AUT	53	13	24	37	52	5	1	2	3	10
2009–10	EC VSV	AUT	43	7	22	29	22	5	1	3	4	4
2010–11	EC VSV	AUT	52	14	29	43	58	10	6	2	8	6
2011–12	EC VSV	AUT	40	13	15	28	24	—	—	—	—	—
2012–13	EC VSV	AUT	35	8	13	21	30	7	1	2	3	14
2013–14	EC VSV	AUT	49	7	27	34	61	9	4	3	7	12
2014–15	EC VSV	AUT	48	6	22	28	57	5	0	1	1	0
2015–16	EC VSV	AUT	23	2	7	9	8	11	1	1	2	2
2016–17	UECR Huben	AUT.4	6	3	3	6	0	—	—	—	—	—
AUT totals			783	160	378	538	743	67	19	23	42	56
DEL totals			163	11	29	40	132	9	1	0	1	4

=== International ===
Year	Team	Event	GP	G	A	Pts	PIM
1993	Austria	WJC B	7	1	1	2	14
1994	Austria	WJC B	7	2	2	4	32
1994	Austria	EJC B	5	3	2	5	4
1994	Austria	WC	5	0	0	0	0
1995	Austria	WJC B	7	1	1	2	16
1995	Austria	WC	7	0	0	0	2
1997	Austria	OGQ	4	0	0	0	0
1997	Austria	WC B	7	1	0	1	6
1998	Austria	OG	4	0	0	0	4
1998	Austria	WC	3	0	1	1	2
1999	Austria	WC	6	1	0	1	6
2000	Austria	WC	6	2	0	2	4
2001	Austria	OGQ	3	0	1	1	4
2001	Austria	WC	6	0	0	0	8
2002	Austria	OG	4	2	0	2	4
2002	Austria	WC	6	1	2	3	8
2003	Austria	WC	6	0	1	1	2
2004	Austria	WC	6	2	0	2	4
2005	Austria	OGQ	3	0	0	0	2
2005	Austria	WC	6	3	1	4	14
2007	Austria	WC	6	0	1	1	4
2008	Austria	WC D1	5	3	3	6	0
2009	Austria	OGQ	3	0	1	1	0
2009	Austria	WC	6	0	1	1	4
2010	Austria	WC D1	5	1	3	4	4
2011	Austria	WC	6	1	0	1	2
2012	Austria	WC D1A	2	3	0	3	0
2013	Austria	OGQ	3	0	1	1	0
2013	Austria	WC	5	1	0	1	2
2014	Austria	OG	4	0	0	0	0
Junior totals			26	7	6	13	66
Senior totals			127	21	16	37	86
