= Gerald Ressmann =

Austrian ice hockey player

Personal information
- Nationality: Austrian
- Born: 24 July 1970 (age 55) Villach, Austria

Sport
- Sport: Ice hockey

Gerald Ressmann (born 24 July 1970) is an Austrian ice hockey player. He competed in the men's tournaments at the 1994 Winter Olympics, the 1998 Winter Olympics and the 2002 Winter Olympics.

== Career statistics ==
=== Regular season and playoffs ===
			Regular season					Playoffs
Season	Team	League	GP	G	A	Pts	PIM	GP	G	A	Pts	PIM
1985–86	EC VSV	AUT	15	0	0	0	0	—	—	—	—	—
1986–87	EC VSV	AUT	5	0	0	0	0	—	—	—	—	—
1987–88	EC VSV	AUT	32	7	1	8	8	—	—	—	—	—
1988–89	EC VSV	AUT	44	4	12	16		—	—	—	—	—
1989–90	EC VSV	AUT	37	11	7	18	34	—	—	—	—	—
1990–91	EC VSV	AUT	40	12	14	26	52	—	—	—	—	—
1991–92	Wiener EV	AUT	33	5	13	18		—	—	—	—	—
1992–93	EC VSV	AUT	37	7	10	17		—	—	—	—	—
1993–94	EC VSV	AUT	51	10	24	34	70	—	—	—	—	—
1994–95	EC VSV	AUT	38	14	33	47		—	—	—	—	—
1995–96	EC VSV	AUT	34	18	37	55	38	—	—	—	—	—
1996–97	EC VSV	AUT	49	15	28	43	97	—	—	—	—	—
1997–98	EC KAC	AUT	49	17	29	46	131	—	—	—	—	—
1998–99	EC KAC	AUT	52	14	32	46	82	—	—	—	—	—
1999–2000	EC KAC	IEHL	28	21	33	54	40	—	—	—	—	—
1999–2000	EC KAC	AUT	16	8	12	20	16	—	—	—	—	—
2000–01	EC KAC	AUT	46	38	73	111	64	—	—	—	—	—
2001–02	EC KAC	AUT	31	15	32	47	45	10	8	7	15	37
2002–03	EC KAC	AUT	42	13	35	48	24	6	5	4	9	4
2003–04	EC KAC	AUT	43	12	26	38	38	8	1	2	3	6
2004–05	EC KAC	AUT	47	6	28	34	42	8	0	3	3	2
2005–06	Vienna Capitals	AUT	29	6	17	23	24	5	0	1	1	4
2006–07	Vienna Capitals	AUT	55	7	15	22	66	1	0	0	0	0
AUT totals			825	239	478	717	831	38	14	17	31	53

=== International ===
Year	Team	Event	GP	G	A	Pts	PIM
1988	Austria	EJC B	5	2	5	7
1989	Austria	WJC C	4	4	2	6	10
1990	Austria	WC B	7	3	0	3	0
1991	Austria	WC B	7	1	0	1	4
1994	Austria	OG	7	0	0	0	4
1996	Austria	WC	7	1	1	2	4
1997	Austria	OGQ	4	0	0	0	0
1998	Austria	OG	4	2	0	2	4
1998	Austria	WC	3	0	0	0	10
1999	Austria	WC	6	1	2	3	16
2000	Austria	WC	6	0	1	1	4
2001	Austria	OGQ	3	0	6	6	6
2001	Austria	WC	6	0	2	2	6
2002	Austria	OG	4	1	0	1	2
2005	Austria	OGQ	2	0	2	2	0
2005	Austria	WC	6	0	0	0	0
Junior totals			9	6	7	13	10
Senior totals			79	10	14	24	60

"Gerald Ressmann". Elite Prospects.
