= Robert Lukas (ice hockey) =

Austrian ice hockey player

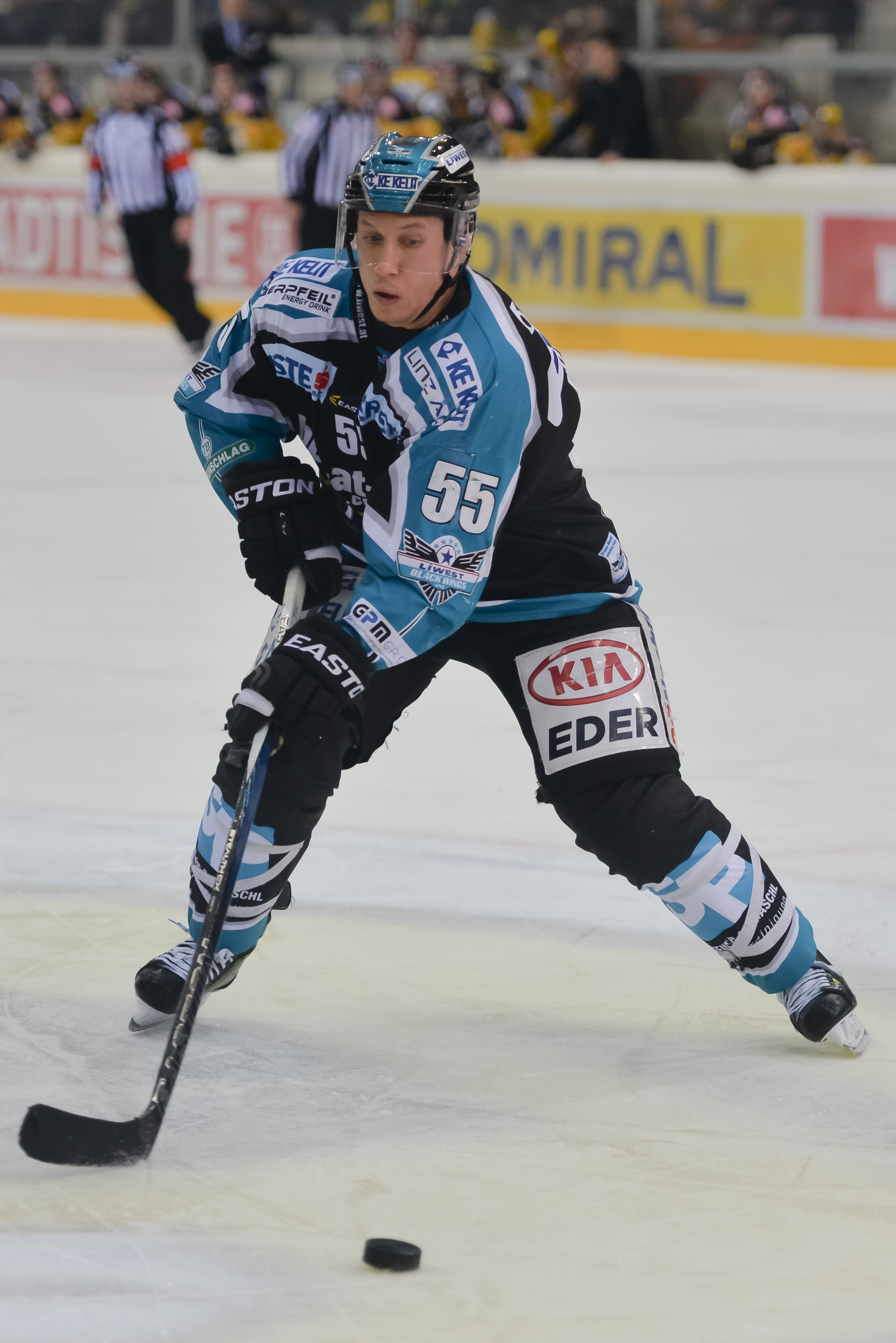
- Born: August 29, 1978 (age 46); Vienna, Austria
- Height: 5 ft 9 in (175 cm)
- Weight: 183 lb (83 kg; 13 st 1 lb)
- Position: Defence
- Shot: Left
- Played for: Wiener EV; VEU Feldkirch; EC VSV; EHC Black Wings Linz; Malmö Redhawks; Vienna Capitals; Kloten Flyers; HK Nitra; EC Red Bull Salzburg
- National team: Austria
- Playing career: 1996–2018

Robert Lukas (born August 29, 1978) is an Austrian former professional ice hockey defenceman who played extensively with EHC Black Wings Linz of the then Austrian Hockey League (EBEL). He has participated in the 2011 IIHF World Championship as a member of the Austria men's national ice hockey team. He competed at the 2002 Winter Olympics and the 2014 Winter Olympics.

He is the brother of teammate and longtime captain of Black Wings Linz, Philipp Lukas.

== Career statistics ==
=== Regular season and playoffs ===
			Regular season					Playoffs
Season	Team	League	GP	G	A	Pts	PIM	GP	G	A	Pts	PIM
1994–95	CE Wien	AUT
1995–96	CE Wien	AUT	2	0	1	1	0	—	—	—	—	—
1996–97	CE Wien	AUT
1997–98	Wiener EV	AUT	26	0	0	0	0	—	—	—	—	—
1998–99	Wiener EV	AUT	46	3	2	5	22	—	—	—	—	—
1999–2000	VEU Feldkirch	AUT	10	1	3	4	2	—	—	—	—	—
1999–2000	VEU Feldkirch	IEHL	32	2	5	7	6	—	—	—	—	—
2000–01	EC VSV	AUT	50	7	6	13	24	—	—	—	—	—
2001–02	Black Wings Linz	AUT	32	9	19	28	34	13	1	10	11	22
2002–03	Black Wings Linz	AUT	42	8	19	27	72	10	2	4	6	8
2003–04	Black Wings Linz	AUT	48	8	24	32	30	3	1	2	3	0
2004–05	Malmö Redhawks	SEL	1	0	0	0	0	—	—	—	—	—
2004–05	Vienna Capitals	AUT	45	7	21	28	18	10	2	5	7	4
2005–06	Liwest Black Wings Linz	AUT	46	6	23	29	99	—	—	—	—	—
2005–06	Kloten Flyers	NLA	—	—	—	—	—	2	0	0	0	0
2006–07	Vienna Capitals	AUT	56	8	32	40	84	3	1	2	3	4
2007–08	HK Ardo Nitra	SVK	33	3	5	8	39	—	—	—	—	—
2007–08	EC Red Bull Salzburg	AUT	12	1	6	7	6	12	0	3	3	4
2008–09	Liwest Black Wings Linz	AUT	54	6	15	21	88	10	0	2	2	20
2009–10	Liwest Black Wings Linz	AUT	51	9	20	29	135	18	0	6	6	16
2010–11	Liwest Black Wings Linz	AUT	33	1	9	10	49	5	0	0	0	34
2011–12	Liwest Black Wings Linz	AUT	47	1	5	6	30	17	0	3	3	18
2012–13	Liwest Black Wings Linz	AUT	53	1	4	5	36	11	1	2	3	6
2013–14	Liwest Black Wings Linz	AUT	52	2	14	16	18	8	1	1	2	4
2014–15	Liwest Black Wings Linz	AUT	36	0	10	10	29	12	0	0	0	10
2015–16	Liwest Black Wings Linz	AUT	52	2	3	5	16	10	0	3	3	8
2016–17	Liwest Black Wings Linz	AUT	35	2	10	12	18	—	—	—	—	—
2017–18	Liwest Black Wings Linz	AUT	54	2	16	18	28	9	0	0	0	0
AUT totals			883	84	272	356	838	151	9	43	52	158

=== International ===
Year	Team	Event	GP	G	A	Pts	PIM
1995	Austria	EJC B	5	0	1	1	2
1996	Austria	WJC B	5	0	0	0	0
1996	Austria	EJC C	4	2	1	3	8
1997	Austria	WJC C	4	3	1	4	0
1998	Austria	WJC C	4	0	1	1	0
2002	Austria	OG	4	0	0	0	0
2002	Austria	WC	6	1	1	2	0
2003	Austria	WC	6	0	2	2	4
2004	Austria	WC	6	1	2	3	0
2005	Austria	OGQ	3	0	0	0	2
2005	Austria	WC	6	1	0	1	2
2006	Austria	WC D1	5	0	2	2	0
2007	Austria	WC	6	1	1	2	12
2008	Austria	WC D1	2	0	0	0	2
2009	Austria	OGQ	3	0	1	1	0
2009	Austria	WC	1	0	0	0	0
2010	Austria	WC D1	5	0	1	1	4
2011	Austria	WC	6	0	1	1	2
2013	Austria	OGQ	3	0	0	0	2
2013	Austria	WC	7	1	2	3	2
2014	Austria	OG	4	0	1	1	0
Junior totals			22	5	4	9	10
Senior totals			73	5	14	19	32
