= Mario Schaden =

Austrian ice hockey player

Personal information
- Nationality: Austrian
- Born: 30 April 1972 (age 53) Zeltweg, Austria

Sport
- Sport: Ice hockey

Mario Schaden (born 30 April 1972) is an Austrian ice hockey player. He competed in the men's tournaments at the 1998 Winter Olympics and the 2002 Winter Olympics.

== Career statistics ==
=== Regular season and playoffs ===
			Regular season					Playoffs
Season	Team	League	GP	G	A	Pts	PIM	GP	G	A	Pts	PIM
1988–89	EV Zeltweg	AUT.2
1989–90	Kapfenberger SV	AUT	29	5	1	6	14	—	—	—	—	—
1990–91	EC KAC	AUT	41	6	1	7		—	—	—	—	—
1991–92	EC KAC	AUT	44	3	3	6		—	—	—	—	—
1992–93	EC KAC	AUT	46	6	9	15		—	—	—	—	—
1993–94	EC KAC	AUT	51	2	3	5		—	—	—	—	—
1994–95	EC KAC	AUT	35	20	8	28		—	—	—	—	—
1995–96	EC KAC	AUT	36	13	9	22	47	—	—	—	—	—
1996–97	EC KAC	AUT	47	11	4	15	20	—	—	—	—	—
1997–98	EC KAC	AUT	49	7	7	14	28	—	—	—	—	—
1998–99	EC KAC	AUT	55	7	12	19	66	—	—	—	—	—
1999–2000	EC KAC	IEHL	34	3	8	11	34	—	—	—	—	—
1999–2000	EC KAC	AUT	16	3	2	5	8	—	—	—	—	—
2000–01	EC KAC	AUT	49	20	12	32	42	—	—	—	—	—
2001–02	EC KAC	AUT	32	9	10	19	44	11	1	0	1	16
2002–03	EC KAC	AUT	41	7	8	15	48	5	1	1	2	6
2003–04	EC KAC	AUT	46	2	2	4	56	8	0	0	0	8
2004–05	EC KAC	AUT	48	1	3	4	22	12	3	2	5	22
2005–06	EC KAC	AUT	38	3	2	5	70	—	—	—	—	—
2006–07	EC KAC	AUT	55	3	4	7	100	—	—	—	—	—
AUT totals			758	128	100	228	565	36	5	3	8	52

=== International ===
Year	Team	Event	GP	G	A	Pts	PIM
1989	Austria	EJC B	5	0	1	1	4
1990	Austria	EJC B	7	3	2	5	10
1992	Austria	WJC B	7	5	2	7	28
1996	Austria	WC	7	1	0	1	0
1997	Austria	OGQ	4	1	0	1	0
1997	Austria	WC B	7	0	0	0	0
1998	Austria	OG	4	0	1	1	2
1998	Austria	WC	3	0	0	0	0
1999	Austria	WC	6	1	0	1	6
2000	Austria	WC	6	0	0	0	2
2001	Austria	OGQ	3	0	0	0	4
2001	Austria	WC	6	0	0	0	2
2002	Austria	OG	4	0	0	0	0
2002	Austria	WC	6	0	0	0	4
2005	Austria	WC	6	0	0	0	4
Junior totals			19	8	5	13	42
Senior totals			62	3	1	4	24

"Mario Schaden". Elite Prospects.
