= Manny Viveiros =

Canadian-Austrian ice hockey player and coach

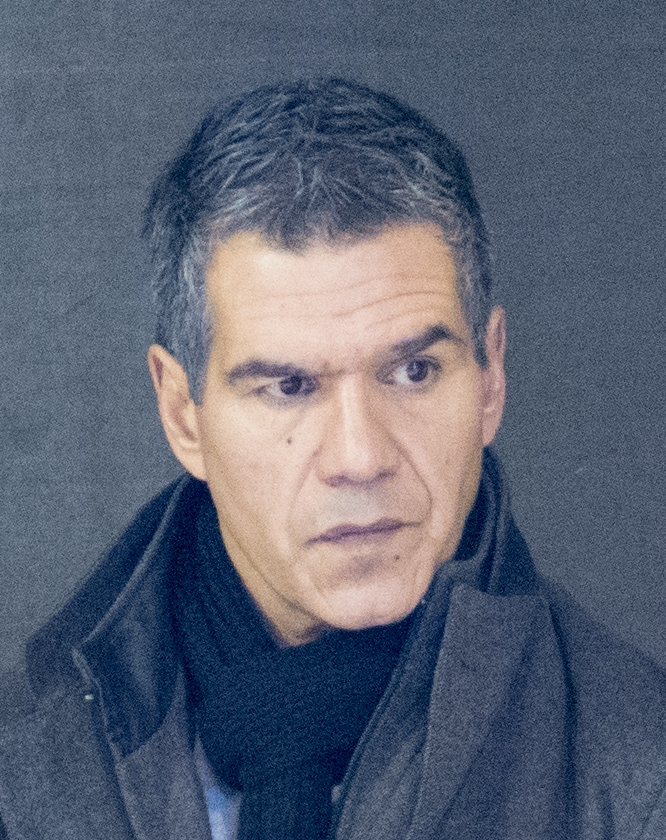
- Viveiros in 2013
- Born: January 8, 1966 (age 60) St. Albert, Alberta, Canada
- Height: 6 ft 0 in (183 cm)
- Weight: 192 lb (87 kg; 13 st 10 lb)
- Position: Defence
- Shot: Left
- Played for: Minnesota North Stars; ESV Kaufbeuren; EC VSV; EHC Lustenau; Schwenninger Wild Wings; EC Graz; Wiener EV; EC KAC
- Current WHL coach: Vancouver Giants
- Coached for: EC KAC; ERC Ingolstadt; Swift Current Broncos; Spokane Chiefs; Henderson Silver Knights
- National team: Austria
- NHL draft: 106th overall, 1984; Edmonton Oilers
- Playing career: 1986–2007

Emanuel "Manny" Viveiros (born January 8, 1966) is a Canadian-Austrian professional ice hockey coach and former player. He is formerly the head coach of the Vancouver Giants of the Western Hockey League (WHL), and formerly served as head coach of the Spokane Chiefs and Swift Current Broncos of the WHL, the Henderson Silver Knights of the American Hockey League (AHL), Klagenfurt AC of the Erste Bank Eishockey Liga (EBEL), and ERC Ingolstadt of the Deutsche Eishockey Liga (DEL), as well as an assistant coach for the Edmonton Oilers of the National Hockey League (NHL). Internationally, Viveiros has served as the head coach of the Austrian national hockey team.

== Playing career ==
As a youth, Viveiros played in the 1979 Quebec International Pee-Wee Hockey Tournament with a minor ice hockey team from St. Albert, Alberta.

Viveiros played for the St. Albert Saints and the Prince Albert Raiders in the early- and mid-1980s. He was a member of the 1985 Memorial Cup-winning Raiders.

He played 29 games in the National Hockey League for the Minnesota North Stars. He won the Calder Cup in the American Hockey League in 1991 with the Springfield Indians. The year after that he signed with the EC VSV in Austria, where he won the national championship in 1992 and 1993.

After four seasons with VSV, Viveiros moved through several teams in Austrian, Italian and German leagues, until settling in with Austrian Klagenfurter AC in 2000, winning two more national championships in 2001 and 2004. Viveiros played in parts of 7 seasons for Klagenfurter AC.

Viveiros also obtained Austrian citizenship and played as part of the Austrian national team in 2005.

== Coaching career ==
He switched to coaching after retiring early into the 2006-07 season due to a back injury and took over head coaching duties at Klagenfurter AC for the 2007-08 campaign. He guided the team to a national championship as a coach in 2009 and to the finals in 2011. However, after a disappointing 2011-12 season Viveiros was removed from his position as head coach, but then was named sports director of the club.

He coached the Austrian national team for three years that included the participation at the 2014 Olympic Games. He did not have his contract renewed in April 2014.

In 2014, he joined the coaching staff of German team ERC Ingolstadt as an assistant, working under Larry Huras. ERC reached the finals of the Deutsche Eishockey Liga that season. Viveiros was promoted to head coach for the following campaign. He was sacked on November 14, 2015, after his team had collected only 17 points from 18 games.

Viveiros was formerly the head coach for the Swift Current Broncos of the Western Hockey League (WHL). On May 25, 2018, he was named as an assistant coach for the Edmonton Oilers. After one season in Edmonton, he returned to the WHL as head coach of the Spokane Chiefs.

On August 31, 2020, he was brought on as head coach for the Henderson Silver Knights, the AHL affiliate of the Vegas Golden Knights. After three seasons coaching Henderson, with just one playoff berth, Viveiros and the organization mutually parted ways on April 19, 2023.

On August 24, 2023, Viveiros was named head coach of the Vancouver Giants, returning to the WHL.

== Career statistics ==
=== Regular season and playoffs ===
			Regular season					Playoffs
Season	Team	League	GP	G	A	Pts	PIM	GP	G	A	Pts	PIM
1981–82	St. Albert Saints	AJHL	10	1	1	2	2	—	—	—	—	—
1982–83	Prince Albert Raiders	WHL	59	6	26	32	55	—	—	—	—	—
1983–84	Prince Albert Raiders	WHL	67	15	94	109	48	2	0	3	3	0
1984–85	Prince Albert Raiders	WHL	68	17	71	88	94	13	2	9	11	14
1984–85	Prince Albert Raiders	MC	—	—	—	—	—	5	2	6	8	4
1985–86	Prince Albert Raiders	WHL	57	22	70	92	30	20	4	24	28	4
1985–86	Minnesota North Stars	NHL	4	0	1	1	0	—	—	—	—	—
1986–87	Minnesota North Stars	NHL	1	0	1	1	0	—	—	—	—	—
1986–87	Springfield Indians	AHL	76	7	35	42	38	—	—	—	—	—
1987–88	Minnesota North Stars	NHL	24	1	9	10	6	—	—	—	—	—
1987–88	Kalamazoo Wings	IHL	57	15	48	63	41	7	1	8	9	0
1988–89	Kalamazoo Wings	IHL	54	11	29	40	37	—	—	—	—	—
1989–90	ESV Kaufbeuren	FRG II	8	2	7	9	8	—	—	—	—	—
1990–91	Albany Choppers	IHL	14	3	7	10	6	—	—	—	—	—
1990–91	Springfield Indians	AHL	48	2	22	24	29	7	0	2	2	4
1991–92	EC VSV	AUT	46	9	47	56	24	—	—	—	—	—
1992–93	EC VSV	AUT	54	13	37	50	—	—	—	—	—	—
1993–94	EC VSV	AUT	51	11	50	61	58	—	—	—	—	—
1995–96	EHC Lustenau	AUT	41	13	32	45	40	—	—	—	—	—
1996–97	SERC Wild Wings	DEL	44	8	17	25	34	—	—	—	—	—
1997–98	SERC Wild Wings	DEL	43	4	8	12	30	8	1	3	4	6
1998–99	WSV Sterzing Broncos	ITA	22	3	12	15	26	—	—	—	—	—
1998–99	WSV Sterzing Broncos	Alp	5	0	1	1	2	—	—	—	—	—
1999–2000	Wiener EV	AUT	11	4	4	8	12	—	—	—	—	—
1999–2000	Wiener EV	IEHL	27	7	6	13	16	—	—	—	—	—
2000–01	EC KAC	AUT	49	21	40	61	30	—	—	—	—	—
2001–02	EC KAC	AUT	17	4	4	8	12	11	2	4	6	6
2002–03	EC KAC	AUT	41	11	18	29	61	6	2	2	4	4
2003–04	EC KAC	AUT	37	5	31	36	26	5	0	1	1	10
2004–05	EC KAC	AUT	37	8	16	24	34	10	1	8	9	8
2005–06	EC KAC	AUT	36	7	8	15	26	—	—	—	—	—
2006–07	EC KAC	AUT	7	1	5	6	14	—	—	—	—	—
NHL totals			29	1	11	12	16	—	—	—	—	—
AHL totals			124	9	57	66	67	7	0	2	2	4
AUT totals			462	116	323	439	410	32	5	15	20	28

=== International ===
Year	Team	Event	Result	GP	G	A	Pts	PIM
1986	Canada	WJC	2nd place, silver medalist(s)	7	1	1	2	2
2005	Austria	WC	16th	5	0	2	2	4

== Awards ==
- WHL East Second All-Star Team – 1984 & 1985
- WHL East First All-Star Team – 1986

Preceded by Mark Lamb	Head coach of the Swift Current Broncos; 2016–2018	Succeeded by Dean Brockman
Preceded by Dan Lambert	Head coach of the Spokane Chiefs; 2019–2020	Succeeded by Adam Maglio
Preceded by Position created	Head coach of the Henderson Silver Knights; 2020–2023	Succeeded by Ryan Craig
Preceded by Michael Dyck	Head coach of the Vancouver Giants; 2023–present	Succeeded by Incumbent
