= Mike Craig (ice hockey, born 1971) =

Canadian ice hockey player

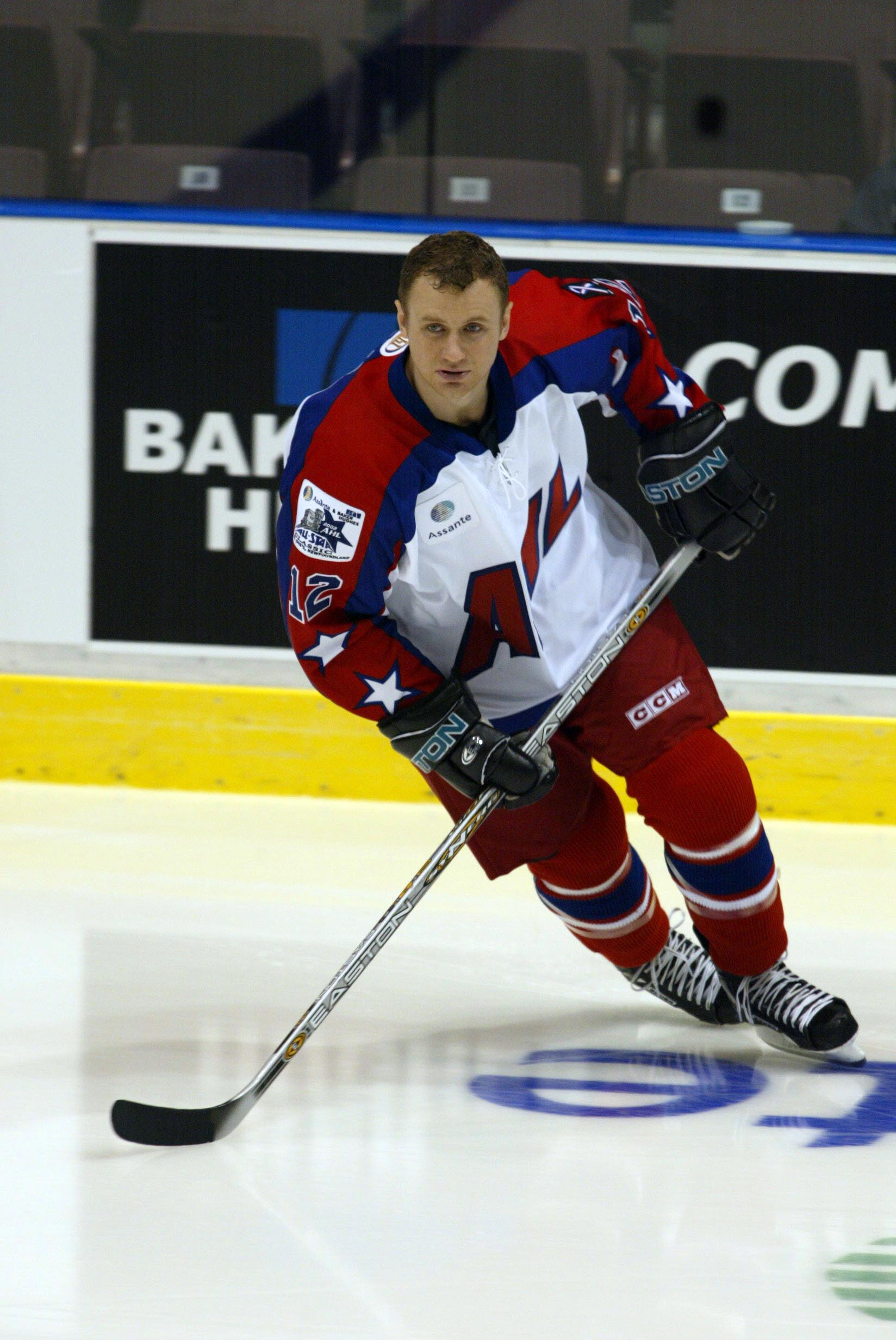
- Craig at the 2002 AHL All-Star Game
- Born: June 6, 1971 (age 54) London, Ontario, Canada
- Height: 6 ft 1 in (185 cm)
- Weight: 185 lb (84 kg; 13 st 3 lb)
- Position: Right wing
- Shot: Right
- Played for: Minnesota North Stars; Dallas Stars; Toronto Maple Leafs; San Jose Sharks; SCL Tigers; Vienna Capitals; EC KAC; EC VSV
- NHL draft: 28th overall, 1989; Minnesota North Stars
- Playing career: 1990–2013

Michael Craig (born June 6, 1971) is a Canadian former professional hockey forward who played in the National Hockey League. He was the last former Minnesota North Star active in professional hockey, and was an assistant coach with the Lethbridge Hurricanes of the Western Hockey League.

== Playing career ==
Craig was born in London, Ontario, but he grew up in nearby Thorndale, Ontario.

Craig had a strong career in the OHL where he played for the Oshawa Generals for three seasons alongside Eric Lindros. After an unspectacular rookie season, he posted excellent numbers, scoring 72 points in 63 games in the 1988/1989 season. His best Junior season was in 1989/1990 when he scored 76 points in 43 and won the Memorial Cup with the Generals. He would also win back to back gold medals playing for Team Canada at the World Junior Ice Hockey Championships in 1990 and 1991 and was named a first team all-star in 1991.

He was drafted 28th overall in the second round of the 1989 NHL entry draft by the Minnesota North Stars.

His NHL career would prove to be less than spectacular, scoring 71 goals and 168 points in 423 games over 9 seasons. He would play with the North Stars and was a part of the team when they moved to Dallas. He also played with Toronto Maple Leafs and San Jose Sharks while also spending time with several IHL and AHL teams.

In 2002, Craig was part of the Canadian team that won the Spengler Cup over host team HC Davos. Craig would score the game-winning goal in the final game of round robin play.

While playing with the Vienna Capitals in the Austrian Hockey League, he led the league in scoring in 2004–05 and leading the Capitals to the championship.

In 2007–08 he joined EC KAC also in the Austrian Hockey League. On October 18, 2011, he signed EC VSV, also in Austria.

During the midpoint of the 2013 season, Craig signed as a free agent for his last professional season in Italy with league leaders HC Neumarkt-Egna of the second division on January 13, 2013.

== Awards ==
- 1990 Won Memorial Cup with Oshawa Generals
- 1990 Won World Junior Championships Gold Medal
- 1991 Won World Junior Championships Gold Medal
- 1991 World Junior Championships First Team All-Star
- 2002 Won Spengler Cup with Team Canada

== Career statistics ==
=== Regular season and playoffs ===
| | | | Regular season | | | | | Playoffs |
| Season | Team | League | GP | G | A | Pts | PIM | GP | G | A | Pts | PIM |
|---|---|---|---|---|---|---|---|---|---|---|---|---|
| 1986–87 | Woodstock Navy-Vets | NDJHL | 32 | 29 | 19 | 48 | 64 | — | — | — | — | — |
| 1987–88 | Oshawa Generals | OHL | 61 | 6 | 10 | 16 | 39 | 7 | 0 | 1 | 1 | 11 |
| 1988–89 | Oshawa Generals | OHL | 63 | 36 | 36 | 72 | 34 | 6 | 3 | 1 | 4 | 6 |
| 1989–90 | Oshawa Generals | OHL | 43 | 36 | 40 | 76 | 85 | 17 | 10 | 16 | 26 | 46 |
| 1990–91 | Minnesota North Stars | NHL | 39 | 8 | 4 | 12 | 32 | 10 | 1 | 1 | 2 | 20 |
| 1991–92 | Minnesota North Stars | NHL | 67 | 15 | 16 | 31 | 155 | 4 | 1 | 0 | 1 | 7 |
| 1992–93 | Minnesota North Stars | NHL | 70 | 15 | 23 | 38 | 106 | — | — | — | — | — |
| 1993–94 | Dallas Stars | NHL | 72 | 13 | 24 | 37 | 139 | 4 | 0 | 0 | 0 | 2 |
| 1994–95 | Toronto Maple Leafs | NHL | 37 | 5 | 5 | 10 | 12 | 2 | 0 | 1 | 1 | 2 |
| 1995–96 | Toronto Maple Leafs | NHL | 70 | 8 | 12 | 20 | 42 | 6 | 0 | 0 | 0 | 18 |
| 1996–97 | Toronto Maple Leafs | NHL | 65 | 7 | 13 | 20 | 62 | — | — | — | — | — |
| 1997–98 | San Antonio Dragons | IHL | 12 | 4 | 1 | 5 | 18 | — | — | — | — | — |
| 1997–98 | Kansas City Blades | IHL | 59 | 14 | 33 | 47 | 68 | 11 | 5 | 5 | 10 | 28 |
| 1998–99 | San Jose Sharks | NHL | 1 | 0 | 0 | 0 | 0 | — | — | — | — | — |
| 1998–99 | Kentucky Thoroughblades | AHL | 52 | 27 | 17 | 44 | 72 | 12 | 5 | 4 | 9 | 18 |
| 1999–2000 | Kentucky Thoroughblades | AHL | 76 | 39 | 39 | 78 | 116 | 9 | 5 | 5 | 10 | 14 |
| 2000–01 | Hershey Bears | AHL | 57 | 21 | 22 | 43 | 73 | 12 | 3 | 2 | 5 | 20 |
| 2001–02 | San Jose Sharks | NHL | 2 | 0 | 0 | 0 | 2 | — | — | — | — | — |
| 2001–02 | Cleveland Barons | AHL | 69 | 35 | 25 | 60 | 87 | — | — | — | — | — |
| 2002–03 | SC Langnau | NLA | 44 | 17 | 18 | 35 | 97 | — | — | — | — | — |
| 2003–04 | Vienna Capitals | AUT | 46 | 24 | 22 | 46 | 76 | — | — | — | — | — |
| 2004–05 | Vienna Capitals | AUT | 41 | 32 | 39 | 71 | 84 | 10 | 5 | 6 | 11 | 22 |
| 2005–06 | Vienna Capitals | AUT | 47 | 25 | 34 | 59 | 103 | 5 | 2 | 0 | 2 | 8 |
| 2006–07 | Vienna Capitals | AUT | 56 | 43 | 43 | 86 | 130 | 3 | 3 | 3 | 6 | 0 |
| 2007–08 | EC KAC | AUT | 34 | 19 | 14 | 33 | 60 | 3 | 0 | 0 | 0 | 24 |
| 2008–09 | EC KAC | AUT | 54 | 25 | 24 | 49 | 78 | 16 | 8 | 12 | 20 | 28 |
| 2009–10 | EC KAC | AUT | 45 | 24 | 14 | 38 | 54 | 7 | 1 | 3 | 4 | 8 |
| 2010–11 | EC KAC | AUT | 46 | 24 | 14 | 38 | 81 | 14 | 6 | 5 | 11 | 20 |
| 2011–12 | EC VSV | AUT | 37 | 14 | 15 | 29 | 40 | — | — | — | — | — |
| 2012–13 | HC Neumarkt-Egna | ITA.2 | 11 | 7 | 8 | 15 | 22 | 7 | 1 | 4 | 5 | 12 |
| NHL totals | | | 423 | 71 | 97 | 168 | 550 | 26 | 2 | 2 | 4 | 49 |
| AHL totals | | | 254 | 122 | 103 | 225 | 348 | 33 | 13 | 11 | 24 | 52 |
| AUT totals | | | 406 | 230 | 219 | 449 | 706 | 58 | 25 | 29 | 54 | 110 |

=== International ===
| Year | Team | Event | GP | G | A | Pts | PIM |
|---|---|---|---|---|---|---|---|
| 1990 | Canada | WJC | 7 | 3 | 0 | 3 | 8 |
| 1991 | Canada | WJC | 7 | 6 | 5 | 11 | 8 |
| Junior totals | | | 14 | 9 | 5 | 14 | 16 |
