= Reinhard Divis =

Austrian ice hockey player (born 1975)

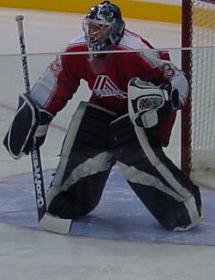
- Divis in 2008
- Born: 4 July 1975 (age 51) Vienna, Austria
- Height: 6 ft 0 in (183 cm)
- Weight: 192 lb (87 kg; 13 st 10 lb)
- Position: Goaltender
- Caught: Left
- Played for: EC Red Bull Salzburg; VEU Feldkirch; Leksands IF; St. Louis Blues; VSV EC; Klagenfurt AC; Färjestads BK
- National team: Austria
- NHL draft: 261st overall, 2000; St. Louis Blues
- Playing career: 1993–2012

Reinhard Divis (born 4 July 1975) is an Austrian former professional ice hockey goaltender. He played 28 games in the National Hockey League with the St. Louis Blues from 2002 to 2006, and was the first Austrian to play in the NHL. The rest of his career, which lasted from 1993 to 2012, was mainly spent in the Austrian Hockey League. Internationally Divis played for the Austrian national team in several World Championships and at the 1998 and 2002 Winter Olympics.

== Playing career ==
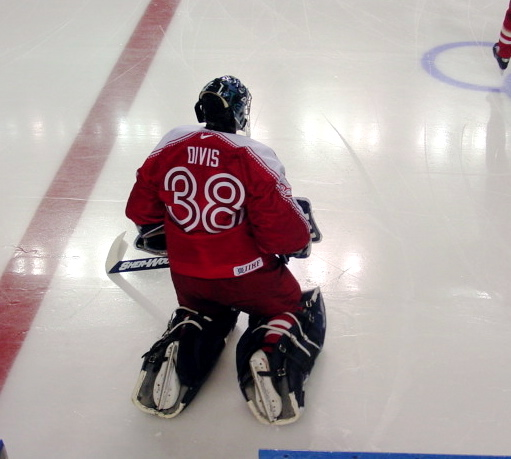
Divis playing for the Austrian national team in 2002

His career began at VEU Feldkirch where he won the Austrian league five times in a row (1994–1998). In 1998 they also won in the finals of the European Hockey League. After VEU Feldkirch got into financial difficulties, Divis left the club and played in Leksands IF (Sweden) for two seasons.

Divis was selected by the St. Louis Blues in the 2000 NHL entry draft as the 261st overall pick, and in 2001 he moved to the United States. In his first season Divis played mostly with the Worcester Ice Cats in the AHL. However, he also served as the backup goalie for St. Louis on a few occasions. He played in one game for 25 minutes, allowing no goals on four shots. In the 2002–03 season Divis played in two games with St. Louis (both victories), allowing one goal on 34 shots. During the 2003–04 season, Divis saw action in 13 games, posting a record of 4–4–2 and a goals against average of 2.77. He also played 18 minutes in one playoff game, stopping all eight shots he faced.

In the 2004–05 season, Divis played for VSV EC in Carinthia (Austria) because of the NHL lockout. However, he played in only 29 games as a result of a shoulder injury, which also prevented him from playing in the IIHF world championship in 2005. VSV EC booked the fourth place in this season. In the goalkeeper's statistics Divis landed on the third rank with 91.96% of held shots in 29 matches.

In the 2005–06 season Divis again served as a backup goalie for the Blues, though he also saw some time with the Peoria Rivermen in the AHL. He played in 12 games for St. Louis, posting a record of 0–5–1, with a 4.67 goals against average. After the 2005–06 season, Divis decided to return to Austria and signed a two-year contract with Red Bulls Salzburg.

Divis also played in the Olympic games in Nagano in 1998 and in Salt Lake City in 2002 for the Austrian national team, and played with the national team in several A world championships starting in 1996.

On 9 June 2008, Divis signed a two-year contract as a free agent with Swedish team Färjestads BK of the Elitserien. In the 2008–09 season, Divis competed in just 15 games with Färjestads, under mutual agreement he returned to his homeland following the completion of the season and rejoined Red Bull Salzburg. In helping Salburg capture the Austrian Hockey League in the 2009–10 season, Divis was re-signed to an additional two-year extension on 11 May 2010.

== Personal ==
Divis is married and has two children, Dominic and Nicole.

== Career statistics ==
=== Regular season and playoffs ===
			Regular season										Playoffs
Season	Team	League	GP	W	L	T	OTL	MIN	GA	SO	GAA	SV%	GP	W	L	MIN	GA	SO	GAA	SV%
1991–92	WAT Stadlau	AUT-2	—	—	—	—	—	—	—	—	—	—	—	—	—	—	—	—	—	—
1993–94	VEU Feldkirch	AUT	10	—	—	—	—	—	—	—	3.10	—	—	—	—	—	—	—	—	—
1994–95	VEU Feldkirch	AUT	28	—	—	—	—	—	—	—	1.98	—	—	—	—	—	—	—	—	—
1995–96	VEU Feldkirch	AUT	37	—	—	—	—	2200	85	0	2.32	—	—	—	—	—	—	—	—	—
1996–97	VEU Feldkirch	ALP	45	—	—	—	—	2738	105	0	2.30	—	11	—	—	620	27	0	2.61	—
1997–98	VEU Feldkirch	AUT	27	—	—	—	—	1620	55	0	2.07	—	—	—	—	—	—	—	—	—
1997–98	VEU Feldkirch	ALP	13	—	—	—	—	779	22	0	1.69	—	—	—	—	—	—	—	—	—
1998–99	VEU Feldkirch	AUT	15	—	—	—	—	900	58	0	3.86	—	—	—	—	—	—	—	—	—
1999–00	Leksands IF	SEL	48	—	—	—	—	2839	160	3	3.38	.892	—	—	—	—	—	—	—	—
2000–01	Leksands IF	SEL	41	—	—	—	—	2451	141	3	3.45	.878	—	—	—	—	—	—	—	—
2001–02	St. Louis Blues	NHL	1	0	0	0	—	25	0	0	0.00	1.000	—	—	—	—	—	—	—	—
2001–02	Worcester IceCats	AHL	55	28	20	5	—	3173	137	3	2.59	.903	3	1	2	205	8	0	2.34	.930
2002–03	St. Louis Blues	NHL	2	2	0	0	—	83	1	0	0.73	.971	—	—	—	—	—	—	—	—
2002–03	Worcester IceCats	AHL	9	6	1	0	—	453	17	0	2.25	.923	—	—	—	—	—	—	—	—
2003–04	St. Louis Blues	NHL	13	4	4	2	—	629	29	0	2.77	.900	1	0	0	18	0	0	0.00	1.000
2003–04	Worcester IceCats	AHL	31	12	10	8	—	1709	63	3	2.21	.918	—	—	—	—	—	—	—	—
2004–05	EC VSV	AUT	26	10	10	4	—	1482	61	2	2.47	.926	3	0	3	169	12	0	4.26	.881
2005–06	St. Louis Blues	NHL	12	0	5	—	1	475	37	0	4.67	.840	—	—	—	—	—	—	—	—
2005–06	Peoria Rivermen	AHL	31	16	10	—	2	1646	76	2	2.77	.899	—	—	—	—	—	—	—	—
2006–07	EC Salzburg	AUT	36	19	10	—	0	2179	96	2	2.64	.911	—	—	—	—	—	—	—	—
2007–08	EC Salzburg	AUT	52	—	—	—	—	3047	129	6	2.54	—	—	—	—	—	—	—	—	—
2008–09	Färjestad BK	SEL	15	—	—	—	—	835	36	1	2.59	.889	—	—	—	—	—	—	—	—
2009–10	EC Salzburg	AUT	16	—	—	—	—	—	—	—	2.79	.899	10	—	—	—	—	—	2.54	.911
2010–11	EC Salzburg	AUT	30	—	—	—	—	—	—	—	2.84	.919	16	—	—	—	—	—	2.74	.918
2011–12	Vienna Capitals	AUT	38	18	18	—	0	—	—	—	2.83	.909	—	—	—	—	—	—	—	—
AUT totals			315	—	—	—	—	—	—	—	—	—	29	—	—	—	—	—	—	—
NHL totals			28	6	9	2	1	1213	67	0	3.32	.880	1	0	0	18	0	0	0.00	1.000

=== International ===
Year	Team	Event	GP	W	L	T	MIN	GA	SO	GAA	SV%
1992	Austria	EJC B	4	—	—	—	—	—	—	1.50	.940
1993	Austria	EJC B	7	—	—	—	—	—	—	3.83	—
1994	Austria	WJC B	7	—	—	—	—	—	—	3.47	.905
1995	Austria	WJC B	7	—	—	—	—	—	—	3.79	.916
1996	Austria	WC	2	—	—	—	80	6	0	4.50	.846
1998	Austria	OLY	2	0	1	0	102	6	0	3.52	.849
1998	Austria	WC	3	—	—	—	160	12	0	4.50	.882
1999	Austria	WC	6	3	3	0	360	19	0	3.17	.908
2000	Austria	WC	6	2	2	2	359	15	0	2.51	.925
2001	Austria	WC	6	—	—	—	327	19	1	3.48	.914
2002	Austria	OLY	4	1	1	2	238	12	0	3.02	.875
2004	Austria	WC	6	1	3	2	358	14	1	2.34	.911
2006	Austria	WC D1	4	4	0	0	240	7	1	1.75	.919
2007	Austria	WC	4	1	3	—	242	18	0	4.46	.861
2010	Austria	WC D1	5	5	0	—	300	5	1	1.00	.952
Senior totals			48	—	—	—	2766	133	4	2.89	—
