= Martin Ulrich =

Austrian ice hockey player (born 1969)

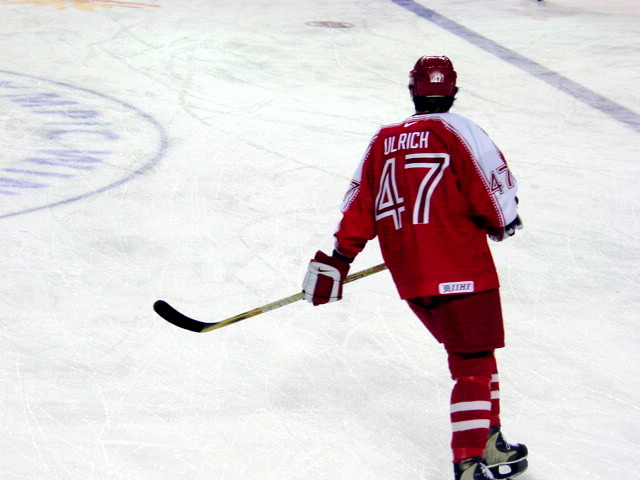
- Martin Ulrich in the 2002 Winter Olympics
- Born: December 16, 1969 (age 56) Vienna, AUT
- Height: 6 ft 2 in (188 cm)
- Weight: 209 lb (95 kg; 14 st 13 lb)
- Position: Defence
- Shot: Left
- Played for: Wiener EV; EC Graz; Adler Mannheim; Berlin Capitals; DEG Metro Stars; EC Red Bull Salzburg
- Playing career: 1986–2009

Martin Ulrich (born December 16, 1969) is a retired Austrian ice hockey defenceman. He was the captain of the Austrian national ice hockey team.

Born in Vienna, Austria, Ulrich began his career with three seasons at Vienna before joining Graz EC in 1991 again in a three-year spell. After a brief return to Vienna, Ulrich moved to the Deutsche Eishockey Liga in Germany, playing for the Adler Mannheim for two seasons. He returned to Vienna for a third time before returning to the DEL in 1999, with spells for the Berlin Capitals and the DEG Metro Stars where he spent four seasons.

In 2005, Ulrich returned to Austria and signed for Red Bull Salzburg, where he played two more seasons before ending his player career in 2008 with the lower class team of EK Zell am See.

In October 2009 Ulrich was named head coach of the Austrian U-18 national ice hockey team.

== International ==
Ulrich played 228 games for the Austrian national ice hockey team, attending 17 World Championships and 3 Olympic Games (1994, 1998, 2002).

== Career statistics ==
=== Regular season and playoffs ===
			Regular season					Playoffs
Season	Team	League	GP	G	A	Pts	PIM	GP	G	A	Pts	PIM
1986–87	Wiener EV	AUT	1	0	0	0	0	—	—	—	—	—
1987–88	Wiener EV	AUT						—	—	—	—	—
1988–89	Wiener EV	AUT	26	2	8	10	10	—	—	—	—	—
1989–90	Wiener EV	AUT	34	5	19	24	42	—	—	—	—	—
1990–91	Wiener EV	AUT	39	7	17	24	67	—	—	—	—	—
1991–92	EC Graz	AUT	45	6	20	26	30	—	—	—	—	—
1992–93	EC Graz	AUT	53	6	13	19	18	—	—	—	—	—
1993–94	EC Graz	AUT	57	12	22	34	54	—	—	—	—	—
1994–95	EC Graz	AUT	36	9	14	23	28	—	—	—	—	—
1995–96	Wiener EV	AUT	32	12	17	29	29	—	—	—	—	—
1996–97	Adler Mannheim	DEL	50	3	8	11	45	9	1	4	5	2
1997–98	Adler Mannheim	DEL	46	3	9	12	30	10	1	2	3	8
1998–99	Wiener EV	AUT	49	13	19	32	46	—	—	—	—	—
1999–2000	Berlin Capitals	DEL	39	6	19	25	38	7	0	3	3	4
2000–01	Berlin Capitals	DEL	60	6	21	27	54	5	0	2	2	4
2001–02	DEG Metro Stars	DEL	58	0	8	8	55	—	—	—	—	—
2002–03	DEG Metro Stars	DEL	42	6	13	19	40	—	—	—	—	—
2003–04	DEG Metro Stars	DEL	56	5	17	22	58	4	0	2	2	8
2004–05	DEG Metro Stars	DEL	50	3	12	15	54	—	—	—	—	—
2005–06	EC Red Bull Salzburg	AUT	44	7	11	18	28	11	1	1	2	12
2006–07	EC Red Bull Salzburg	AUT	54	10	33	43	70	8	2	3	5	8
2007–08	EC Red Bull Salzburg	AUT	44	3	13	16	22	14	0	6	6	4
2008–09	EK Zell am See	AUT.2	23	4	18	22	22	8	1	3	4	0
AUT totals			514	92	206	298	444	33	3	10	13	24
DEL totals			401	32	107	139	374	35	2	13	15	26

=== International ===
Year	Team	Event	GP	G	A	Pts	PIM
1987	Austria	WJC B	5	0	1	1	8
1989	Austria	WJC C	4	2	2	4	7
1991	Austria	WC B	7	0	1	1	2
1992	Austria	WC B	7	1	2	3	2
1993	Austria	WC	6	0	1	1	0
1994	Austria	OG	7	1	1	2	0
1994	Austria	WC	6	0	0	0	2
1995	Austria	WC	7	0	1	1	6
1996	Austria	WC	7	0	0	0	4
1997	Austria	OGQ	4	1	0	1	0
1997	Austria	WC B	7	2	0	2	0
1998	Austria	OG	4	0	3	3	0
1998	Austria	WC	3	0	0	0	2
1999	Austria	WC	6	1	1	2	10
2000	Austria	WC	6	0	2	2	0
2001	Austria	OGQ	3	0	1	1	0
2001	Austria	WC	6	0	0	0	8
2002	Austria	OG	4	0	0	0	4
2002	Austria	WC	6	0	1	1	2
2004	Austria	WC	6	0	1	1	2
2005	Austria	OGQ	3	1	1	2	0
2005	Austria	WC	6	0	3	3	2
2006	Austria	WC D1	5	0	2	2	0
2007	Austria	WC	3	0	0	0	0
2008	Austria	WC D1	5	1	4	5	2
Junior totals			9	2	3	5	15
Senior totals			124	8	25	33	48
