= Tom Searle =

Austrian ice hockey player

Personal information
- Nationality: Austrian
- Born: 26 April 1963 (age 61); Hamilton, Ontario, Canada

Sport
- Sport: Ice hockey

Tom Searle (born 26 April 1963) is an Austrian ice hockey player. He competed in the men's tournaments at the 1998 Winter Olympics and the 2002 Winter Olympics.

== Career statistics ==
=== Regular season and playoffs ===
| | | | Regular season | | | | | Playoffs |
| Season | Team | League | GP | G | A | Pts | PIM | GP | G | A | Pts | PIM |
|---|---|---|---|---|---|---|---|---|---|---|---|---|
| 1979–80 | Dundas Blues | GHL | 30 | 7 | 16 | 23 | 84 | — | — | — | — | — |
| 1981–82 | Brantford Alexanders | OHL | 64 | 17 | 25 | 42 | 110 | 11 | 1 | 3 | 4 | 8 |
| 1982–83 | Brantford Alexanders | OHL | 63 | 24 | 20 | 44 | 65 | 8 | 3 | 3 | 6 | 5 |
| 1983–84 | Brantford Alexanders | OHL | 9 | 1 | 4 | 5 | 19 | — | — | — | — | — |
| 1983–84 | Newmarket Flyers | OPJHL | 32 | 28 | 30 | 58 | 118 | — | — | — | — | — |
| 1984–85 | St. Catharines Saints | AHL | 10 | 0 | 1 | 1 | 2 | — | — | — | — | — |
| 1984–85 | Dundas Real McCoys | OHA-Sr. | | 27 | 35 | 62 | | — | — | — | — | — |
| 1985–86 | Flint Spirits | IHL | 61 | 15 | 41 | 56 | 66 | — | — | — | — | — |
| 1986–87 | Kalamazoo Wings | IHL | 64 | 15 | 38 | 53 | 49 | 4 | 0 | 2 | 2 | 2 |
| 1986–87 | Milwaukee Admirals | IHL | 16 | 3 | 3 | 6 | 9 | — | — | — | — | — |
| 1988–89 | Ayr Bruins | GBR | 35 | 55 | 66 | 121 | 114 | 6 | 3 | 7 | 10 | 18 |
| 1989–90 | Ayr Bruins | GBR | 32 | 44 | 23 | 67 | 98 | — | — | — | — | — |
| 1990–91 | Richmond Renegades | ECHL | 38 | 16 | 45 | 61 | 54 | 4 | 2 | 2 | 4 | 2 |
| 1991–92 | Brantford Smoke | CoHL | 59 | 35 | 52 | 87 | 67 | 6 | 6 | 4 | 10 | 4 |
| 1992–93 | Brantford Smoke | CoHL | 49 | 25 | 48 | 73 | 91 | 15 | 6 | 17 | 23 | 13 |
| 1992–93 | Capital District Islanders | AHL | 9 | 2 | 3 | 5 | 4 | — | — | — | — | — |
| 1993–94 | VEU Feldkirch | AUT | 55 | 18 | 30 | 48 | | — | — | — | — | — |
| 1994–95 | VEU Feldkirch | AUT | 41 | 12 | 19 | 31 | | — | — | — | — | — |
| 1995–96 | VEU Feldkirch | AUT | 37 | 15 | 28 | 43 | 56 | — | — | — | — | — |
| 1996–97 | VEU Feldkirch | AUT | 56 | 17 | 34 | 51 | 71 | — | — | — | — | — |
| 1997–98 | VEU Feldkirch | AUT | 47 | 11 | 19 | 30 | 42 | — | — | — | — | — |
| 1998–99 | EC VSV | AUT | 55 | 9 | 34 | 43 | 67 | — | — | — | — | — |
| 1999–2000 | EC VSV | IEHL | 29 | 5 | 14 | 19 | 18 | — | — | — | — | — |
| 1999–2000 | EC VSV | AUT | 15 | 3 | 8 | 11 | 35 | — | — | — | — | — |
| 2000–01 | EC VSV | AUT | 47 | 9 | 39 | 48 | 87 | — | — | — | — | — |
| 2001–02 | EC VSV | AUT | 32 | 7 | 23 | 30 | 50 | 16 | 3 | 11 | 14 | 12 |
| 2002–03 | EC VSV | AUT | 29 | 4 | 16 | 20 | 52 | 13 | 3 | 5 | 8 | 16 |
| 2002–03 | Dundas Real McCoys | MLH | 6 | 2 | 5 | 7 | 12 | — | — | — | — | — |
| 2003–04 | EC VSV | AUT | 21 | 3 | 9 | 12 | 6 | 8 | 1 | 1 | 2 | 8 |
| 2004–05 | Dundas Real McCoys | MLH | 6 | 2 | 4 | 6 | 12 | — | — | — | — | — |
| IHL totals | | | 141 | 33 | 82 | 115 | 124 | 4 | 0 | 2 | 2 | 2 |
| AUT totals | | | 435 | 108 | 259 | 367 | 466 | 37 | 7 | 17 | 24 | 36 |

=== International ===
| Year | Team | Event | GP | G | A | Pts | PIM |
|---|---|---|---|---|---|---|---|
| 1997 | Austria | OGQ | 4 | 0 | 0 | 0 | 6 |
| 1997 | Austria | WC B | 7 | 3 | 4 | 7 | 8 |
| 1998 | Austria | OG | 4 | 0 | 2 | 2 | 2 |
| 1998 | Austria | WC | 3 | 0 | 1 | 1 | 8 |
| 1999 | Austria | WC | 6 | 0 | 2 | 2 | 2 |
| 2000 | Austria | WC | 6 | 1 | 2 | 3 | 2 |
| 2001 | Austria | OGQ | 3 | 0 | 2 | 2 | 2 |
| 2001 | Austria | WC | 6 | 1 | 0 | 1 | 4 |
| 2002 | Austria | OG | 4 | 1 | 0 | 1 | 4 |
| Senior totals | | | 43 | 6 | 13 | 19 | 38 |

"Tom Searle". Elite Prospects.
