= John Miner (ice hockey) =

Canadian ice hockey player (born 1965)

- Born: August 28, 1965 (age 60) Moose Jaw, Saskatchewan, Canada
- Height: 5 ft 10 in (178 cm)
- Weight: 194 lb (88 kg; 13 st 12 lb)
- Position: Defense
- Shot: Right
- Played for: Edmonton Oilers
- NHL draft: 220th overall, 1983; Edmonton Oilers
- Playing career: 1984–2008

John Miner (born August 28, 1965) is a retired Canadian ice hockey defenceman. In the 1987–88 season, he played in 14 games for the NHL's Edmonton Oilers. He was born in Moose Jaw, Saskatchewan.

== Career statistics ==
=== Regular season and playoffs ===
			Regular season					Playoffs
Season	Team	League	GP	G	A	Pts	PIM	GP	G	A	Pts	PIM
1981–82	Regina Pats	WHL	10	0	1	1	11	17	0	0	0	53
1981–82	Regina Blues	SJHL	56	12	29	41	347	—	—	—	—	—
1982–83	Regina Pats	WHL	71	11	23	34	126	5	1	1	2	20
1983–84	Regina Pats	WHL	70	27	42	69	132	—	—	—	—	—
1984–85	Regina Pats	WHL	66	30	54	84	128	8	4	10	14	12
1984–85	Nova Scotia Oilers	AHL	—	—	—	—	—	3	2	2	4	2
1985–86	Nova Scotia Oilers	AHL	79	10	33	43	90	—	—	—	—	—
1986–87	Nova Scotia Oilers	AHL	45	5	28	33	38	5	0	3	3	4
1987–88	Edmonton Oilers	NHL	14	2	3	5	16	—	—	—	—	—
1987–88	Nova Scotia Oilers	AHL	61	8	26	34	61	—	—	—	—	—
1988–89	Wiener EV	AUT	37	19	33	52	—	—	—	—	—	—
1988–89	New Haven Nighthawks	AHL	7	2	3	5	4	17	3	12	15	40
1989–90	Lausanne HC	NLB	35	19	32	51	80	—	—	—	—	—
1989–90	New Haven Nighthawks	AHL	7	1	6	7	2	—	—	—	—	—
1990–91	Lausanne HC	NLB	36	17	40	57	65	9	6	10	16	10
1991–92	EK Zell am See	AUT	42	16	37	53	44	—	—	—	—	—
1992–93	EK Zell am See	AUT	52	19	52	71	70	—	—	—	—	—
1993–94	HC Ajoie	NLB	34	16	22	38	42	—	—	—	—	—
1994–95	HC Martigny	NLB	36	15	28	43	—	—	—	—	—	—
1995–96	EV Zug	NLA	29	12	20	32	36	4	0	2	2	0
1996–97	EV Zug	NLA	45	15	32	47	50	10	2	7	9	4
1997–98	EV Zug	NLA	35	5	17	22	28	4	0	2	2	0
1998–99	Kölner Haie	DEL	52	5	26	31	77	5	1	1	2	0
1999–00	Kölner Haie	DEL	56	7	27	34	50	10	2	7	9	10
2000–01	Kölner Haie	DEL	60	6	25	31	54	3	0	0	0	0
2001–02	Kölner Haie	DEL	56	5	16	21	52	13	1	3	4	14
2002–03	HC Ajoie	NLB	38	8	35	43	97	5	1	3	4	0
2002–03	SC Bern	NLA	—	—	—	—	—	2	0	0	0	4
2003–04	Augsburger Panther	DEL	52	10	25	35	72	—	—	—	—	—
2003–04	EHC Linz	EBEL	4	2	0	2	2	3	1	2	3	2
2004–05	Augsburger Panther	DEL	52	8	17	25	72	5	0	3	3	6
2005–06	EK Zell am See	AUT-2	39	17	35	52	66	—	—	—	—	—
2006–07	SønderjyskE Ishockey	DEN	22	3	12	15	46	13	2	8	10	42
2007–08	Pingouins de Morzine-Avoriaz	FRA	26	1	8	9	48	7	0	6	6	18
DEL totals			328	41	136	177	377	36	4	14	18	30
NHL totals			14	2	3	5	16	—	—	—	—	—

== Awards ==
- WHL East Second All-Star Team – 1984
- WHL East First All-Star Team – 1985
