= Tom Searle (disambiguation) =

Tom Searle may refer to:

- Tom Searle (musician), Former guitarist for Architects
- Tom Searle (Ice hockey player), Austrian ice hockey player
