= Kevin Kraxner =

Austrian ice hockey player

- Born: May 21, 1986 (age 39)
- Height: 5 ft 8 in (173 cm)
- Weight: 172 lb (78 kg; 12 st 4 lb)
- Position: Forward
- Shot: Left
- EBEL team Former teams: Vienna Capitals; Graz 99ers
- Playing career: 2004–2011

Kevin Kraxner (born May 21, 1986) is a former Austrian ice hockey forward who played for Vienna Capitals of the Austrian Hockey League, he ended his career on April 28, 2011 due to a hip injury.

Kraxner began playing for Graz U20 before moving to Germany where he spent two seasons with the Rosenheim Star Bulls. In 2005 he returned to Graz at senior level where he continues to play. 2006-07 was a good season for Kraxner, scoring 19 points (8G and 11A) in 46 games. However, in 2007-08, he only managed to score 2 points in 42 games.
