= Robert Lukas =

Robert Lukas may refer to:

- Robert Lukas (ice hockey) (born 1978), Austrian ice hockey defenceman
- Robert Lukas (racing driver) (born 1988), Polish racing driver
