= 2010–11 Austrian Hockey League season =

2010–11 Erste Bank Eishockey Liga
- League: Erste Bank Eishockey Liga
- Sport: Ice hockey
- Teams: 10

Regular season
- Winners: EC KAC
- Top scorer: Francois Fortier

Austrian Hockey League seasons
- 2009–10 season 2011–12 season

The 2010–11 Austrian Hockey League was a season of the Austrian Hockey League (known as Erste Bank Eishockey Liga (or EBEL league) for sponsorship reasons). The 2010–11 season ended with an exciting victory in game 7 of the championship finals for the EC Red Bull Salzburg team.

== Teams ==
Team	City/Area	Arena	Capacity	Founded	Joined EBEL
Red Bull Salzburg	(Austria) Salzburg	Eisarena Salzburg	3,600	1977	
Graz 99ers	(Austria) Graz	Eisstadion Graz Liebenau	4,050	1999	
EC KAC	(Austria) Klagenfurt	Stadthalle Klagenfurt	5,500	1909	
Black Wings Linz	(Austria) Linz	Keine Sorgen Eisarena Linz	3,800	1992	
Vienna Capitals	(Austria) Vienna	Albert Schultz Eishalle	4,500	2000	
Villacher SV	(Austria) Villach	Villacher Stadthalle	4,800	1923	
Acroni Jesenice	(Slovenia) Jesenice	Dvorana Podmežakla	6,000	1948	2006/07
Olimpija Ljubljana	(Slovenia) Ljubljana	Dvorana Tivoli	4,500	1929	2007/08
SAPA Fehérvár AV 19	(Hungary) Székesfehérvár	Ifjabb Ocskay Gábor Ice Hall	3,600	1960	2007/08
KHL Medveščak Zagreb	(Croatia) Zagreb	Dom Sportova / Arena Zagreb	6,000 / 15,024	1961	2009/10

== Regular season ==
=== Standings ===
R	Team	GP	W	L	OTL	GF	GA	Pts
1	EC KAC	54	36	12	6	190	159	78
2	Red Bull Salzburg	54	33	19	2	206	181	68
3	Vienna Capitals	54	31	18	5	200	162	67
4	Villacher SV	54	28	20	5	180	167	63
5	Black Wings Linz	54	26	21	7	156	166	59
6	Graz 99ers	54	27	23	4	164	153	58
7	Olimpija Ljubljana	54	24	25	5	165	197	53
8	KHL Medveščak Zagreb	54	23	25	6	171	171	52
9	SAPA Fehérvár AV 19	54	21	26	7	162	203	49
10	Jesenice	54	20	25	9	161	196	49

=== Individual statistics ===
==== Scoring leaders ====
The following players led the league in points at the conclusion of the regular season.

Player	Team	GP	G	A	Pts	+/–	PIM
Francois Fortier	Vienna Capitals	51	48	36	84	+30	61
Benoit Gratton	Vienna Capitals	45	27	46	73	+23	247
Rok Ticar	Jesenice	54	24	44	68	+8	16
John Hughes	Olimpija Ljubljana	53	16	48	64	-6	28
Balazs Ladanyi	SAPA Fehérvár AV 19	54	22	38	60	-1	20
Robert Sabolič	Jesenice	54	33	26	59	-4	64
Ryan Kinasewich	KHL Medveščak Zagreb	49	30	29	59	+22	16
Derek Damon	Villacher SV	53	24	33	57	+9	158
Thomas Koch	Red Bull Salzburg	49	23	34	57	+15	34
Michael Raffl	Villacher SV	50	26	29	55	+25	62

==== Leading goaltenders ====
The following goaltenders led the league in goals against average at the end of the regular season.

Player	Team	GP	Min	SOG	SVS	GA	SV%	GAA
Andy Chiodo	EC KAC	41	1,776:07	946	867	79	.916	2,67
Adam Hauser	Vienna Capitals	28	1,425:18	744	680	64	.914	2,69
Bernhard Starkbaum	Villacher SV	54	1,895:32	1101	1015	86	.922	2,72
Fabian Weinhandl	Graz 99ers	54	3,251:47	1625	1475	150	.908	2,77
Alex Westlund	Black Wings Linz	52	2,775:01	1503	1374	129	.914	2,79
Robert Kristan	KHL Medveščak Zagreb	52	2,844:18	1782	1649	133	.925	2,81
Reinhard Divis	Red Bull Salzburg	35	1,630:42	945	868	76	.919	2,83
Jürgen Penker	Vienna Capitals	34	1,672:44	947	868	79	.917	2,83
Michal Fikrt	Jesenice	20	1,195:49	599	539	60	.900	3,01
René Swette	EC KAC	54	1,510:39	813	733	80	.902	3,18

== Playoffs ==
The EC Red Bull Salzburg team won the season, after beating the EC KAC 4–3 in the final series. Game 7 ended with an exciting overtime goal by the Red Bulls, giving them the league championship for the second year in a row, with a final game score of 3–2.

After the regular season, the standard of 8 teams qualified for the playoffs. In the playoff games the better placed team at the end of the regular season will have the right to play at home first. In the quarterfinals the 1st ranked team will play against the 8th ranked team, 2nd vs 7th, 3rd vs 6th, 4th vs 5th - each in a best-of-seven series.

In the semifinals the four winners of the quarterfinals will play as follows: the best ranked club (in the regular season) of the four semifinalists will play against the worst ranked club, the second best ranked club against the second worst ranked club - each in a best-of-seven series. The two winners of the semifinals will play a best-of-seven series in the final round.

If a playoff game is undecided at the end of the regular time after a 17 minutes break a 20-minute "Sudden Victory Overtime" will be played. Should the game still be undecided after the first overtime period after another 17 minutes break a second 20-minute "Sudden Victory Overtime" will be played and so on until the deciding goal is scored. Each team may only use four skaters; however, at least three skaters must be used.

Quarterfinals
1	(Austria) EC KAC	4
8	(Croatia) KHL Medveščak	1
2	(Austria) Red Bull Salzburg	4
7	(Slovenia) Olimpija Ljubljana	1
(Pairings are reseeded after the first round)
3	(Austria) Vienna Capitals	4
6	(Austria) Graz 99ers	0
4	(Austria) Villacher SV	4
5	(Austria) Black Wings Linz	1

Semifinals
1	(Austria) EC KAC	4
4	(Austria) Villacher SV	1
2	(Austria) Red Bull Salzburg	4
3	(Austria) Vienna Capitals	3

Finals
1	(Austria) EC KAC	3
2	(Austria) Red Bull Salzburg	4
