= 2009–10 Austrian Hockey League season =

2009–10 Erste Bank Eishockey Liga
- League: Erste Bank Eishockey Liga
- Sport: Ice hockey
- Teams: 10
- Regular-season winner: Graz 99ers
- Champions: Red Bull Salzburg
- Runners-up: Black Wings Linz

Austrian Hockey League seasons
- 2008–09 season 2010–11 season

The 2009–10 Austrian Hockey League was a season of the Austrian Hockey League (known as Erste Bank Eishockey Liga (or EBEL league) for sponsorship reasons).

== Regular season - final standings ==
#	Team	GP	W	L	OTW	OTL	SOW	SOL	GF	GA	GDIF	Pts
1	(Austria) Graz 99ers	54	36	18	3	2	3	3	197	132	+65	77
2	(Austria) Red Bull Salzburg	54	33	21	5	4	1	1	203	158	+45	71
3	(Austria) Vienna Capitals	54	33	21	5	3	2	1	193	156	+37	70
4	(Austria) Black Wings Linz	54	30	24	0	2	2	7	176	150	+26	69
5	(Austria) Villacher SV	54	29	25	3	1	2	1	162	174	−12	60
6	(Hungary) SAPA Fehérvár AV 19	54	25	29	2	7	3	0	165	184	−19	57
7	(Austria) EC KAC	54	27	27	3	1	4	2	166	159	+7	57
8	(Croatia) KHL Medveščak Zagreb	54	25	29	5	5	4	2	160	182	−22	57
9	(Slovenia) Jesenice	54	16	38	4	3	2	4	148	205	−57	39
10	(Slovenia) Olimpija Ljubljana	54	16	38	1	3	0	2	141	211	−70	37

== Playoffs (Best of seven) ==
Quarterfinals
1	(Austria) Graz 99ers	2
8	(Croatia) KHL Medveščak Zagreb	4
4	(Austria) Red Bull Salzburg	4
5	(Austria) EC KAC	3
2	(Austria) Vienna Capitals	4
7	(Hungary) SAPA Fehérvár AV 19	1
3	(Austria) Black Wings Linz	4
6	(Austria) Villacher SV	1

Semifinals
(Croatia) KHL Medveščak Zagreb	1
(Austria) Red Bull Salzburg	4
(Austria) Vienna Capitals	3
(Austria) Black Wings Linz	4

Final
(Austria) Red Bull Salzburg	4
(Austria) Black Wings Linz	2
