= 2011–12 Austrian Hockey League season =

2011–12 Erste Bank Eishockey Liga
- League: Erste Bank Eishockey Liga
- Sport: Ice hockey
- Teams: 11

Regular season
- Winners: Black Wings Linz
- Champions: Black Wings Linz
- Runners-up: EC KAC
- Top scorer: István Sofron

Austrian Hockey League seasons
- 2010–11 season 2012–13 season

The 2011–12 Austrian Hockey League was a season of the Austrian Hockey League (known as Erste Bank Eishockey Liga - or EBEL league - for sponsorship reasons). The Black Wings Linz won their second Austrian championship after 2003 by defeating the EC KAC in the Playoff-Final four games to one.

== Teams ==
Team	City/Area	Arena	Capacity	Founded	Joined EBEL
Red Bull Salzburg	(Austria) Salzburg	Eisarena Salzburg	3,600	1977	
Graz 99ers	(Austria) Graz	Eisstadion Graz Liebenau	4,050	1999	
EC KAC	(Austria) Klagenfurt	Stadthalle Klagenfurt	5,500	1909	
Black Wings Linz	(Austria) Linz	Keine Sorgen Eisarena Linz	3,800	1992	
Vienna Capitals	(Austria) Vienna	Albert Schultz Eishalle	4,500	2000	
Villacher SV	(Austria) Villach	Villacher Stadthalle	4,800	1923	
Acroni Jesenice	(Slovenia) Jesenice	Dvorana Podmežakla	6,000	1948	2006/07
Olimpija Ljubljana	(Slovenia) Ljubljana	Dvorana Tivoli	4,500	1929	2007/08
SAPA Fehérvár AV 19	(Hungary) Székesfehérvár	Ifjabb Ocskay Gábor Ice Hall	3,600	1960	2007/08
KHL Medveščak Zagreb	(Croatia) Zagreb	Dom Sportova / Arena Zagreb	6,000 / 15,024	1961	2009/10
Orli Znojmo	(Czech Republic) Znojmo	Hostan Arena	5,500	1933	2011/12

== Regular season ==
=== Regular season ===
After 40 regular season games, the league was divided into two mid-season groups, who played games amongst each other. The first six teams qualified into the playoffs, but played a further 10 games each in the Placement Round to decide the best rankings. Earlier points were annulled, except for the 1st team receiving +4, the 2nd +3, the 3rd + 2, and the 4th +1 extra initial point(s) for this phase.

The last 5 teams played 8 games each in the Qualifying Round to reach the remaining two playoff spots. Earlier points were annulled except for the 7th receiving + 3, the 8th + 2, and the 9th + 1 extra initial point(s) for this phase. In the playoff games the better placed team at the end of these mid-season groups will have the right to play at home first. In the quarterfinals the 1st ranked team will play against the 8th ranked team, 2nd vs 7th, 3rd vs 6th, 4th vs 5th - each in a best-of-seven series.

Key to colours in group tables
Top six placed teams advanced to the Placement Round
Last five placed teams advanced to the Qualifying Round

R	Team	GP	W	L	OTL	GF	GA	Pts
1	Black Wings Linz	40	29	11	4	147	104	62
2	KHL Medveščak Zagreb	40	24	16	6	135	99	54
3	Red Bull Salzburg	40	24	16	3	144	129	51
4	EC KAC	40	22	18	4	124	114	48
5	Olimpija Ljubljana	40	21	19	3	122	119	45
6	SAPA Fehérvár AV 19	40	20	20	4	132	122	44
7	Villacher SV	40	21	19	0	112	101	42
8	Vienna Capitals	40	17	23	6	120	136	40
9	Graz 99ers	40	19	21	1	112	123	39
10	Orli Znojmo	40	14	26	6	100	137	34
11	Jesenice	40	9	31	7	82	146	25

=== Placement Round ===
EHC Black Wings Linz started with +4, KHL Medveščak Zagreb with +3, EC Red Bull Salzburg with +2 and EC KAC with +1 points.

R	Team	GP	W	L	OTL	GF	GA	Pts
1	Black Wings Linz	10	6	4	0	32	29	16
2	KHL Medveščak Zagreb	10	5	5	1	31	29	14
3	SAPA Fehérvár AV 19	10	7	3	0	37	26	14
4	Red Bull Salzburg	10	4	6	1	32	42	11
5	EC KAC	10	4	6	0	26	28	9
6	Olimpija Ljubljana	10	4	6	1	35	39	9

=== Qualifying round ===
Villacher SV started with +3, Vienna Capitals with + 2 and the Graz 99ers with +1 points.

Key to colours in group tables
Top two placed teams advanced to Playoffs

R	Team	GP	W	L	OTL	GF	GA	Pts
1	Orli Znojmo	8	5	3	1	28	22	11
2	Vienna Capitals	8	4	4	1	30	20	11
3	Villacher SV	8	4	4	0	16	18	11
4	Graz 99ers	8	4	4	1	18	18	10
5	Jesenice	8	3	5	0	19	33	6

== Playoffs ==
In the semifinals the four winners of the quarterfinals will play as follows: the best ranked club (in the regular season) of the four semifinalists will play against the worst ranked club, the second best ranked club against the second worst ranked club - each in a best-of-seven series. The two winners of the semifinals will play a best-of-seven series in the final round.

If a playoff game is undecided at the end of the regular time after a 17 minutes break a 20-minute "Sudden Victory Overtime" will be played. Should the game still be undecided after the first overtime period after another 17 minutes break a second 20-minute "Sudden Victory Overtime" will be played and so on until the deciding goal is scored. Each team may only use four skaters; however, at least three skaters must be used.

Quarterfinals
1	(Austria) Black Wings Linz	4
8	(Austria) Vienna Capitals	3
2	(Croatia) KHL Medveščak	4
7	(Czech Republic) Orli Znojmo	0
(Pairings are reseeded after the first round)
3	(Hungary) SAPA Fehérvár AV 19	2
6	(Slovenia) Olimpija Ljubljana	4
4	(Austria) Red Bull Salzburg	2
5	(Austria) EC KAC	4

Semifinals
1	(Austria) Black Wings Linz	4
6	(Slovenia) Olimpija Ljubljana	1
2	(Croatia) KHL Medveščak	1
5	(Austria) EC KAC	4

Finals
1	(Austria) Black Wings Linz	4
5	(Austria) EC KAC	1
