= 2008–09 Austrian Hockey League season =

Austrian ice hockey season

The 2008–09 Austrian Hockey League season was the 79th season of the Austrian Hockey League, the top level of ice hockey in Austria. 10 teams participated in the league, and EC KAC won the championship.

== Regular season ==
Place	Team	GP	W	L	OTW	OTL	GF	GA	+/-	Pts
1.	(Austria) EC KAC	54	38	16	6	4	204	141	63	80
2.	(Austria) Vienna Capitals	54	33	21	8	7	203	162	41	73
3.	(Austria) EC Red Bull Salzburg	54	32	22	7	4	200	157	43	68
4.	(Austria) EC VSV	54	31	23	5	5	183	153	30	67
5.	(Austria) EHC Linz	54	30	24	7	3	166	144	20	63
6.	(Slovenia) HK Jesenice	54	24	30	3	6	179	197	-18	54
7.	(Austria) Graz 99ers	54	24	30	5	6	124	154	-30	54
8.	(Austria) HC TWK Innsbruck	54	24	30	7	6	153	186	-33	54
9.	(Hungary) Alba Volán Székesfehérvár	54	17	37	5	9	129	178	-49	43
10.	(Slovenia) HDD Olimpija Ljubljana	54	17	37	4	7	131	200	-69	41

== Playoffs ==
=== Quarterfinals ===
- EC KAC - HC TWK Innsbruck 4:2 (8:2, 2:3, 5:2, 1:3, 5:0, 3:1)
- Vienna Capitals - Graz 99ers 4:3 (6:0, 1:2, 3:2, 3:2, 1:3, 1:2, 5:1)
- EC Red Bull Salzburg - HK Jesenice 4:1 (3:2 P, 2:6, 9:1, 3:1, 4:1)
- EC VSV - EHC Linz 2:4 (1:2, 1:2, 5:2, 2:3, 2:1, 0:2)

=== Semifinals ===
- EC KAC - EHC Linz 4:0 (2:0, 4:2, 5:1, 5:3)
- Vienna Capitals - EC Red Bull Salzburg 1:4 (4:3 P, 2:4, 1:4, 1:2, 3:5)

=== Final ===
- EC KAC - EC Red Bull Salzburg 4:3 (5:4 P, 2:7, 3:6, 4:1, 3:0, 2:3 P, 2:1)
