= 2002–03 Austrian Hockey League season =

Austrian ice hockey season

The 2002–03 Austrian Hockey League season was the 73rd season of the Austrian Hockey League, the top level of ice hockey in Austria. Eight teams participated in the league, and the EHC Black Wings Linz won the championship.

== Regular season ==
Place	Team	GP	W	L (OTL)	GF–GA	Pts
1	EHC Black Wings Linz	42	29	13 (4)	173:103	51
2	HC Innsbruck	42	26	16 (3)	151:135	48
3	EC VSV	42	24	18 (4)	134:123	47
4	Supergau Feldkirch	42	25	17 (3)	150:133	40
5	EC KAC	42	19	23 (8)	144:119	37
6	Vienna Capitals	42	19	23 (6)	137:137	37
7	EC Graz 99ers	42	14	28 (3)	111:181	26
8	EHC Lustenau	42	12	30 (2)	115:184	23

== Playoffs ==
Quarterfinals
1	EHC Linz	3
8	EHC Lustenau	0
4	Supergau Feldkirch	0
5	EC KAC	3
2	HC Innsbruck	3
7	Graz 99ers	0
3	EC VSV	3
6	Vienna Capitals	2

Semifinals
1	EHC Linz	3
5	EC KAC	0
2	HC Innsbruck	1
3	EC VSV	3

Finals
1	EHC Linz	3
3	EC VSV	1
