= 2007–08 Austrian Hockey League season =

2007–2008 season of the Austrian Hockey League

The 2007–08 Austrian Hockey League season was the 78th season of the Austrian Hockey League, the top level of ice hockey in Austria. 10 teams participated in the league, and EC Red Bull Salzburg won the championship.

== First round ==
| Place | Team | GP | W | L (OTL) | Diff. | Points |
|---|---|---|---|---|---|---|
| 1. | Black Wings Linz | 36 | 22 | 14 (5) | 111:91 | 49 |
| 2. | Vienna Capitals | 36 | 22 | 14 (5) | 122:86 | 49 |
| 3. | EC Red Bull Salzburg | 36 | 20 | 16 (6) | 121:108 | 46 |
| 4. | HK Jesenice | 36 | 21 | 15 (4) | 100:94 | 46 |
| 5. | EC KAC | 36 | 21 | 15 (3) | 119:102 | 45 |
| 6. | EC VSV | 36 | 18 | 18 (6) | 109:109 | 42 |
| 7. | HC Innsbruck | 36 | 19 | 17 (3) | 124:116 | 41 |
| 8. | HDD Olimpija Ljubljana | 36 | 17 | 19 (3) | 108:107 | 37 |
| 9. | EC Graz 99ers | 36 | 15 | 21 (5) | 99:132 | 35 |
| 10. | Alba Volán Székesfehérvár | 36 | 5 | 31 (4) | 69:137 | 14 |

== Second round ==
=== Placing round ===
| Place | Team | GP | W | L (OTL) | Diff. | Points(Bonus) |
|---|---|---|---|---|---|---|
| 1. | Vienna Capitals | 10 | 7 | 3 (1) | 40:23 | 18 (3) |
| 2. | EC KAC | 10 | 8 | 2 (0) | 45:30 | 16 (0) |
| 3. | Black Wings Linz | 10 | 5 | 5 (0) | 36:35 | 14 (4) |
| 4. | EC Red Bull Salzburg | 10 | 5 | 5 (1) | 37:33 | 13 (2) |
| 5. | EC VSV | 10 | 3 | 7 (1) | 29:43 | 7 (0) |
| 6. | HK Jesenice | 10 | 2 | 8 (1) | 24:47 | 6 (1) |

=== Qualification round ===
| Place | Team | GP | W | L (OTL) | Diff. | Points(Bonus) |
|---|---|---|---|---|---|---|
| 1. | HDD Olimpija Ljubljana | 6 | 5 | 1 (1) | 25:10 | 12 (1) |
| 2. | HC Innsbruck | 6 | 4 | 2 (0) | 19:18 | 10 (2) |
| 3. | EC Graz 99ers | 6 | 1 | 5 (2) | 9:19 | 4 (0) |
| 4. | Alba Volán Székesfehérvár | 6 | 2 | 4 (0) | 9:15 | 4 (0) |

== Playoffs ==
Quarterfinals
1 | Vienna Capitals | 3
8 | HC Innsbruck | 0
4 | EC Red Bull Salzburg | 3
5 | EC VSV | 2
3 | Black Wings Linz | 3
6 | HK Jesenice | 2
2 | EC KAC | 0
7 | HDD Olimpija Ljubljana | 3

Semifinals
1 | Vienna Capitals | 0
4 | EC Red Bull Salzburg | 4
3 | Black Wings Linz | 2
7 | HDD Olimpija Ljubljana | 4

Finals
4 | EC Red Bull Salzburg | 4
7 | HDD Olimpija Ljubljana | 2
