= Ice hockey at the 2002 Winter Olympics – Men's qualification =

Qualification for the men's ice hockey tournament at the 2002 Winter Olympics was determined by the standings of the 1999 Men's Ice Hockey World Championships. 14 nations qualified: the top eight teams in the 1999 tournament received automatic berths, while lower ranked teams had the opportunity to qualify for the remaining six spots.

== Qualified teams ==
Event	Date	Location	Vacancies	Qualified
1999 IIHF World Championship	5 April–16 May 1999	(Norway) Lillehammer, Hamar and Oslo	8	Czech Republic; Finland; Sweden; Canada; Russia; United States; Slovakia; Switzerland
Final qualification tournaments	8–11 February 2001	(Norway) Oslo	3	Germany; Belarus; Ukraine
Final qualification tournaments	8–11 February 2001	(Austria) Klagenfurt	3	Latvia; France; Austria
Total			14	

== Regional qualification ==
Two regional qualifiers were used to reduce the field for pre-qualification to 16 nations.

=== Far East ===
Played from 3 to 5 September 1999 in Aomori, Japan.

Pos	Team	Pld	W	D	L	GF	GA	GD	Pts	Qualification
1	Japan	2	2	0	0	14	0	+14	4	Pre-qualification
2	China	2	1	0	1	4	7	−3	2	
3	South Korea	2	0	0	2	2	13	−11	0	

Source: Hockey Archives

3 September 1999	China	4–2 (0–2, 2–0, 2–0)	South Korea	Aomori

4 September 1999	Japan	9–0 (3–0,2–0,4–0)	South Korea	Aomori

5 September 1999	Japan	5–0 (2–0, 2–0, 1–0)	China	Aomori

=== European ===
Played from 11 to 12 December 1999 in Sofia, Bulgaria.

11 December 1999	Bulgaria	6–7 (2–0, 2–3, 2–4)	Yugoslavia	Sofia

12 December 1999	Bulgaria	4–7 (2–1,1–3,1–3)	Yugoslavia	Sofia

Yugoslavia won two games to nil and advanced to pre-qualification.

== Pre-qualification ==
Four tournaments were played 10–13 February 2000 with each group winner advancing to the final qualification round.

=== Group 1 ===
The tournament was held in Ljubljana, Slovenia.

Pos	Team	Pld	W	D	L	GF	GA	GD	Pts	Qualification
1	Germany	3	3	0	0	21	3	+18	6	Final qualification
2	Italy	3	2	0	1	21	2	+19	4	
3	Slovenia (H)	3	1	0	2	13	12	+1	2	
4	Yugoslavia	3	0	0	3	0	38	−38	0	

Source: Hockey Archives
(H) Hosts

10 February 2000	Germany	14–0 (5–0, 5–0, 4–0)	Yugoslavia	Ljubljana

10 February 2000	Slovenia	0–7 (0–1, 0–2, 0–4)	Italy	Ljubljana

12 February 2000	Italy	13–0 (5–0, 5–0, 3–0)	Yugoslavia	Ljubljana

12 February 2000	Slovenia	2–5 (0–1, 2–1, 0–3)	Germany	Ljubljana

13 February 2000	Slovenia	11–0 (1–0, 4–0, 6–0)	Yugoslavia	Ljubljana

13 February 2000	Italy	1–2 (0–1, 0–0, 1–1)	Germany	Ljubljana

=== Group 2 ===
The tournament was held in Tallinn, Estonia.

Pos	Team	Pld	W	D	L	GF	GA	GD	Pts	Qualification
1	Ukraine	3	2	0	1	11	6	+5	4	Final qualification
2	Kazakhstan	3	2	0	1	20	9	+11	4	
3	Estonia (H)	3	2	0	1	13	9	+4	4	
4	Lithuania	3	0	0	3	5	25	−20	0	

Source: Hockey Archives
(H) Hosts

10 February 2000	Kazakhstan	13–2 (1–1, 7–0, 5–1)	Lithuania	Tallinn

10 February 2000	Estonia	0–5 (0–2, 0–2, 0–1)	Ukraine	Tallinn

11 February 2000	Ukraine	3–1 (1–0, 1–0, 1–1)	Lithuania	Tallinn

11 February 2000	Estonia	4–2 (0–1, 2–0, 2–1)	Kazakhstan	Tallinn

13 February 2000	Ukraine	3–5 (0–2, 2–1, 1–2)	Kazakhstan	Tallinn

13 February 2000	Estonia	9–2 (6–1, 2–1, 1–0)	Lithuania	Tallinn

=== Group 3 ===
The tournament was held in Gdańsk, Poland.

Pos	Team	Pld	W	D	L	GF	GA	GD	Pts	Qualification
1	France	3	3	0	0	19	7	+12	6	Final qualification
2	Poland (H)	3	2	0	1	17	9	+8	4	
3	Great Britain	3	1	0	2	10	9	+1	2	
4	Romania	3	0	0	3	3	24	−21	0	

Source: Hockey Archives
(H) Hosts

10 February 2000	Great Britain	4–0 (2–0, 2–0, 0–0)	Romania	Gdańsk

10 February 2000	Poland	2–5 (0–1, 2–3, 0–1)	France	Gdańsk

11 February 2000	France	9–1 (3–1, 3–0, 3–0)	Romania	Gdańsk

11 February 2000	Great Britain	2–4 (0–1, 1–2, 1–1)	Poland	Gdańsk

13 February 2000	France	5–4 (1–1, 4–2, 0–1)	Great Britain	Gdańsk

13 February 2000	Romania	2–11 (2–1, 0–5, 0–5)	Poland	Gdańsk

=== Group 4 ===
The tournament was held in Copenhagen, Denmark.

Pos	Team	Pld	W	D	L	GF	GA	GD	Pts	Qualification
1	Denmark (H)	3	3	0	0	16	7	+9	6	Final qualification
2	Japan	3	2	0	1	15	11	+4	4	
3	Netherlands	3	1	0	2	9	9	0	2	
4	Hungary	3	0	0	3	5	18	−13	0	

Source: Hockey Archives
(H) Hosts

10 February 2000	Japan	7–1 (4–0, 2–1, 1–0)	Hungary	Copenhagen

10 February 2000	Denmark	3–1 (2–1, 0–0, 1–0)	Netherlands	Copenhagen

12 February 2000	Denmark	6–3 (3–1, 1–0, 2–2)	Hungary	Copenhagen

12 February 2000	Japan	5–3 (2–1, 2–0, 1–2)	Netherlands	Copenhagen

13 February 2000	Hungary	1–5 (0–3, 0–1, 1–1)	Netherlands	Copenhagen

13 February 2000	Denmark	7–3 (2–1, 1–1, 4–1)	Japan	Copenhagen

== Final Olympic qualification ==
Two tournaments were played from 8–11 February 2001, with six of the remaining eight nations qualifying for the Olympic tournament.

=== Group A ===
The tournament was held in Oslo, Norway.

Pos	Team	Pld	W	D	L	GF	GA	GD	Pts	Qualification
1	Germany	3	2	1	0	10	6	+4	5	2002 Winter Olympics
2	Belarus	3	1	2	0	10	6	+4	4	2002 Winter Olympics
3	Ukraine	3	1	1	1	8	6	+2	3	2002 Winter Olympics
4	Norway (H)	3	0	0	3	8	18	−10	0	

Source: IIHF
(H) Hosts

8 February 2001; 16:00	Ukraine	2–2 (1–2, 0–0, 1–0)	Belarus	Jordal Amfi, Oslo; Attendance: 460

8 February 2001; 20:00	Norway	4–6 (0–0, 2–2, 2–4)	Germany	Jordal Amfi, Oslo; Attendance: 2,845

10 February 2001; 13:30	Belarus	1–1 (1–1, 0–0, 0–0)	Germany	Jordal Amfi, Oslo; Attendance: 2,522

10 February 2001; 18:30	Norway	1–5 (0–1, 1–2, 0–2)	Ukraine	Jordal Amfi, Oslo; Attendance: 510

11 February 2001; 14:45	Germany	3–1 (2–1, 1–0, 0–0)	Ukraine	Furuset Forum, Oslo; Attendance: 317

11 February 2001; 15:30	Norway	3–7 (0–0, 2–4, 1–3)	Belarus	Jordal Amfi, Oslo; Attendance: 1,785

=== Group B ===
The tournament was held in Klagenfurt, Austria.

Pos	Team	Pld	W	D	L	GF	GA	GD	Pts	Qualification
1	Latvia	3	2	1	0	9	6	+3	5	2002 Winter Olympics
2	France	3	1	2	0	6	5	+1	4	2002 Winter Olympics
3	Austria (H)	3	1	1	1	12	9	+3	3	2002 Winter Olympics
4	Denmark	3	0	0	3	5	12	−7	0	

Source: IIHF
(H) Hosts

8 February 2001; 16:00	Latvia	4–2 (0–2, 2–0, 2–0)	Denmark	Stadthalle, Klagenfurt; Attendance: 500

8 February 2001; 19:30	France	3–3 (1–1, 0–1, 2–1)	Austria	Stadthalle, Klagenfurt; Attendance: 2,000

10 February 2001; 16:00	Latvia	1–1 (0–1, 1–0, 0–0)	France	Stadthalle, Klagenfurt; Attendance: 1,500

10 February 2001; 19:30	Austria	6–2 (2–1, 1–0, 3–1)	Denmark	Stadthalle, Klagenfurt; Attendance: 3,000

11 February 2001; 16:00	France	2–1 (0–0, 1–0, 1–1)	Denmark	Stadthalle, Klagenfurt; Attendance: 500

11 February 2001; 19:30	Austria	3–4 (0–1, 2–2, 1–1)	Latvia	Stadthalle, Klagenfurt; Attendance: 2,200
