= 2001–02 Austrian Hockey League season =

Austrian ice hockey season

The 2001–02 Austrian Hockey League season was the 72nd season of the Austrian Hockey League, the top level of ice hockey in Austria. Nine teams participated in the league, and EC VSV won the championship.

== Regular season ==
Place	Team	GP	W	L (OTL)	GF–GA	Pts
1	EHC Black Wings Linz	32	26	6 (1)	147: 62	39
2	EC VSV	32	23	9 (3)	120:79	36
3	EC KAC	32	20	12 (2)	119:81	32
4	Vienna Capitals	32	16	16 (7)	106:97	30
5	EC Graz 99ers	32	13	19 (5)	99:114	26
6	EK Zell am See	32	15	17 (2)	107:117	24
7	EHC Lustenau	32	14	18 (3)	105:129	24
8	HC Innsbruck	32	13	19 (2)	103:119	20
9	Kapfenberger SV	32	4	28 (2)	79:187	8

== Playoffs ==
Quarterfinals
1	EHC Black Wings Linz	4
8	HC Innsbruck	0
4	Vienna Capitals	4
5	EC Graz 99ers	0
2	EC VSV	4
7	EHC Lustenau	1
3	EC KAC	4
6	EK Zell am See	1

Semifinals
1	EHC Black Wings Linz	4
4	Vienna Capitals	0
2	EC VSV	4
3	EC KAC	2

Finals
1	EHC Black Wings Linz	1
2	EC VSV	4
