= 1999–2000 Austrian Hockey League season =

Austrian ice hockey season

The 1999-00 Austrian Hockey League season was the 70th season of the Austrian Hockey League, the top level of ice hockey in Austria. Four teams participated in the league, and EC KAC won the championship.

== Regular season ==
Place	Team	GP	W	L (OTL)	GF–GA	Pts
1	EC VSV	6	6	0 (0)	35:5	12
2	EC KAC	6	3	3 (0)	24:22	6
3	Wiener EV	6	2	4 (1)	15:29	5
4	VEU Feldkirch	6	1	5 (0)	11:29	2

== Playoffs ==
Semifinals
1	EC VSV	4
4	VEU Feldkirch	0
2	EC KAC	4
3	Wiener EV	1

Final
1	EC VSV	1
2	EC KAC	4
