= Ice hockey at the 1998 Winter Olympics – Men's qualification =

Fourteen nations would qualify for the Olympic tournament, eight to the preliminary round, and six to the first round. The IIHF used the standings of the 1995 Men's World Ice Hockey Championships to determine qualification. First, the top six nations from Pool A would go directly to the first round. The preliminary round was made up of the nations ranked seventh and eighth, along with the host Japan, and five others from a series of qualification tournaments. The nations ranked nine through twelve went straight to the final qualification round.

== Regional Pre-Qualification ==
Group A

Five nations played each other twice, both home and away, from October 25, 1995, until December 12, 1996.

Rank	Team	GP	W	L	T	GF	GA	PTS	(Switzerland)	(United Kingdom)	(Denmark)	(Slovenia)	(Netherlands)
1	Switzerland	8	6	0	2	42	14	14		2–2	8–1	5–3	7–1
2	Great Britain	8	5	0	3	31	15	13	3–3		1–1	5–0	4–1
3	Denmark	8	3	4	1	23	28	7	2–6	2–3		4–2	4–0
4	Slovenia	8	3	5	0	32	24	6	1–4	4–5	5–1		9–0
5	Netherlands	8	0	8	0	8	55	0	1–7	2–8	3–8	0–8	

Group B

This tournament was played in Tychy, Poland, from December 17 to 22, 1996.

Rank	Team	GP	W	L	T	GF	GA	PTS	(Ukraine)	(Poland)	(Romania)	(Bulgaria)	(Federal Republic of Yugoslavia)
1	Ukraine	4	3	0	1	51	3	7		3–3	10–0	17–0	21–0
2	Poland	4	3	0	1	36	8	7	3–3		6–3	14–0	13–2
3	Romania	4	2	2	0	19	22	4	0–10	3–6		7–2	9–4
4	Bulgaria	4	1	3	0	7	40	2	0–17	0–14	2–7		5–2
5	Yugoslavia	4	0	4	0	8	48	0	0–21	2–13	4–9	2–5	

- Note: In January 1996 Greece beat Israel 10–2, but forfeited the result because of an ineligible player. Following that, in March of the same year Israel played Yugoslavia, in Lithuania, losing 5–3. Israel's loss is officially a 5–0 loss, the match was declared forfeit because they used ineligible players from Russia.

Group C

This tournament was played in Riga, Latvia, from August 27 to September 1, 1996.

Rank	Team	GP	W	L	T	GF	GA	PTS	(Belarus)	(Latvia)	(Hungary)	(Estonia)	(Lithuania)
1	Belarus	4	4	0	0	54	4	8		4–1	13–1	16–1	21–1
2	Latvia	4	3	1	0	53	6	6	1–4		10–2	15–0	27–0
3	Hungary	4	2	2	0	19	31	4	1–13	2–10		7–4	9–4
4	Estonia	4	1	3	0	14	41	2	1–16	0–15	4–7		9–3
5	Lithuania	4	0	4	0	8	66	0	1–21	0–27	4–9	3–9	

- Note: In January 1996 Hungary played a challenge series against Croatia winning 7–0 and 6–0.

Group D

The Asian Winter Games were used as a qualifying tournament, and were played in Harbin, China, from February 5 to 8, 1996. Japan participated though already qualified for the Olympics.

Team	GP	W	L	T	GF	GA	PTS	(Kazakhstan)	(Japan)	(China)	(South Korea)
Kazakhstan	3	3	0	0	33	2	6		4–1	20–0	9–1
Japan	3	2	1	0	14	6	4	1–4		7–1	6–1
China	3	1	2	0	7	29	2	0–20	1–7		6–2
South Korea	3	0	3	0	4	21	0	1–9	1–6	2–6	

== Final Olympic Qualification ==
The top two from each group qualify, the two third placed nations play for the final spot.

Group 1

Played in Oberhausen, Germany, from February 6 to 9, 1997.

Team	GP	W	L	T	GF	GA	PTS	(Germany)	(Slovakia)	(Switzerland)	(Ukraine)
Germany	3	2	0	1	11	7	5		3–2	4–1	4–4
Slovakia	3	1	1	1	9	7	3	2–3		3–3	4–1
Switzerland	3	1	1	1	6	8	3	1–4	3–3		2–1
Ukraine	3	0	2	1	6	10	1	4–4	1–4	1–2	

Group 2

Played in Innsbruck, Austria, from February 6 to 9, 1997.

Team	GP	W	L	T	GF	GA	PTS	(Belarus)	(Kazakhstan)	(Austria)	(Norway)
Belarus	3	1	0	2	12	8	4		4–4	6–2	2–2
Kazakhstan	3	1	0	2	11	8	4	4–4		4–1	3–3
Austria	3	1	2	0	7	11	2	2–6	1–4		4–1
Norway	3	0	1	2	6	9	2	2–2	3–3	1–4	

Play-off

February 11, 1997	Austria	2–0 (0–0, 1–0, 1–0)	Switzerland	Duisburg Germany

Austria secures the final spot in the preliminary round.

== Sources ==
- Olympic Qualifiers 1995–98 (in French)
- Hokej SFRP – Olympic Games 1998 Qualifikation (in English)
- avlh.sweb.cz – Kvalifikace Zimních olympijských her 1998
- Hockeyarchives – Qualifications pour les Jeux Olympiques 1998 (in French)
