= 1991–92 Austrian Hockey League season =

Austrian ice hockey season

The 1991–92 Austrian Hockey League season was the 62nd season of the Austrian Hockey League, the top level of ice hockey in Austria. Seven teams participated in the league, and EC VSV won the championship.

== Regular season ==
Place	Team	GP	W	T	L	GF–GA	Pts (Bonus)
1	EC VSV	24	18	3	3	133: 75	43 (4)
2	EC Graz	24	11	8	5	118: 86	30 (0)
3	EV Innsbruck	24	9	6	9	100:104	27 (3)
4	EC KAC	24	9	6	9	101: 96	26 (2)
5	VEU Feldkirch	24	11	4	9	84: 81	22 (0)
6	Wiener EV	24	5	4	15	83:126	15 (1)
7	EK Zell am See	24	4	3	17	81:132	11 (0)

== Playoffs ==
Semifinals
1	EC VSV	2
4	EC KAC	0
2	EC Graz	2
3	Innsbruck	0

Final
1	EC VSV	2
2	EC Graz	0

=== Semifinals ===
Series	Score	Match 1	Match 2	Match 3
EC VSV (1) - EC KAC (4)	2:0	3:2	7:5	
EC Graz(2) - Innsbruck (3)	2:0	10:3	9:3	

=== Final ===
Series	Score	Match 1	Match 2	Match 3
EC VSV (1) - EC Graz (2)	2:0	11:5	3:2	
