= 2003–04 Austrian Hockey League season =

Austrian ice hockey season

The 2003–04 Austrian Hockey League season was the 74th season of the Austrian Hockey League, the top level of ice hockey in Austria. Seven teams participated in the league, and EC KAC won the championship.

== Regular season ==
Place	Team	GP	W	L (OTL)	GF–GA	Pts
1	EC KAC	48	31	17 (5)	162:119	53
2	EHC Linz	48	27	21 (3)	147:119	43
3	EC VSV	48	26	22 (3)	148:134	40
4	EC Graz 99ers	48	25	23 (3)	141:147	38
5	Vienna Capitals	48	22	26 (4)	113:128	37
6	Supergau Feldkirch	48	19	29 (5)	116:133	33
7	HC Innsbruck	48	18	30 (5)	108:155	32

== Playoffs ==
Semifinals
1	EC KAC	3
4	EC Graz 99ers	0
2	EHC Linz	0
3	EC VSV	3

Finals
1	EC KAC	3
3	EC VSV	2
