= 1993–94 Austrian Hockey League season =

The 1993–94 Austrian Hockey League season was the 64th season of the Austrian Hockey League, the top level of ice hockey in Austria. Four teams participated in the league, and VEU Feldkirch won the championship.

== Regular season ==
Place	Team	GP	W	T	L	GF–GA	Pts (Bonus)
1	EC Graz	18	10	2	6	67:50	25 (3)
2	EC VSV	18	8	4	6	66:61	20 (0)
3	VEU Feldkirch	18	7	3	8	54:62	19 (2)
4	EC KAC	18	5	3	10	53:67	14 (1)

== Playoffs ==
Semifinals
1	EC Graz	3
4	EC KAC	2
2	EC VSV	2
3	VEU Feldkirch	3

Final
1	EC Graz	1
3	VEU Feldkirch	3

=== Semifinals ===
Series	Score	Match 1	Match 2	Match 3	Match 4	Match 5
EC Graz (1) - KAC (4)	3:2	5:2	6:0	2:4	1:5	4:2
EC VSV (2) - VEU Feldkirch (3)	2:3	8:4	5:8	7:6	2:6	2:5

=== Final ===
Series	Score	Match 1	Match 2	Match 3	Match 4	Match 5
EC Graz (1) - VEU Feldkirch (3)	1:3	1:3	6:2	1:5	1:3	
