= 2005–06 Austrian Hockey League season =

Austrian ice hockey season

The 2005–06 Austrian Hockey League season was the 76th season of the Austrian Hockey League, the top level of ice hockey in Austria. Seven teams participated in the league, and EC VSV won the championship.

== Regular season ==
Place	Team	GP	W	L (OTL)	GF–GA	Pts
1.	EC Red Bull Salzburg	48	29	13 (6)	177:140	49
2.	EC VSV	48	27	15 (6)	149:125	47
3.	HC Innsbruck	48	26	17 (5)	160:147	40
4.	Vienna Capitals	48	25	20 (3)	173:163	40
5.	EC KAC	48	22	20 (6)	136:153	39
6.	EHC Linz	48	24	19 (5)	141:156	38
7.	EC Graz 99ers	48	15	27 (6)	119:171	28

== Playoffs ==
Semifinals
1	EC Red Bull Salzburg	4
4	Vienna Capitals	1
2	EC VSV	4
4	HC Innsbruck	3

Final
1	EC Red Bull Salzburg	2
2	EC VSV	4
