= 2006–07 Austrian Hockey League season =

Austrian ice hockey season

The 2006–07 Austrian Hockey League season was the 77th season of the Austrian Hockey League, the top level of ice hockey in Austria. Eight teams participated in the league, and EC Red Bull Salzburg won the championship.

== Regular season ==
Place	Team	GP	W	L (OTL)	Diff.	Points
1.	EC Red Bull Salzburg	56	40	16 (6)	232:157	64
2.	EC VSV	56	34	22 (8)	205:161	56
3.	EHC Linz	56	31	25 (3)	196:167	51
4.	Vienna Capitals	56	29	27 (5)	214:205	48
5.	HK Jesenice	56	29	27 (5)	194:192	48
6.	HC Innsbruck	56	28	28 (2)	188:221	43
7.	EC KAC	56	22	34 (3)	173:208	35
8.	EC Graz 99ers	56	11	45 (7)	163:254	19

== Playoffs ==
Semifinals
1	EC Red Bull Salzburg	3
4	Vienna Capitals	0
2	EC VSV	3
3	EHC Linz	2

Final
1	EC Red Bull Salzburg	4
2	EC VSV	3
