= 2004–05 Austrian Hockey League season =

Austrian ice hockey season

The 2004–05 Austrian Hockey League season was the 75th season of the Austrian Hockey League, the top level of ice hockey in Austria. Seven teams participated in the league, and the Vienna Capitals won the championship.

== Regular season ==
Place	Team	GP	W	L(OTL)	GF–GA	Pts
1	Vienna Capitals	48	34	14 (4)	199:142	57
2	EC KAC	48	30	18 (5)	151:125	49
3	HC Innsbruck	48	24	24 (8)	151:135	42
4	EC VSV	48	24	24 (3)	136:143	40
5	EC Graz 99ers	48	24	24 (6)	152:147	40
6	EHC Black Wings Linz	48	20	28 (5)	119:157	32
7	EC Red Bulls Salzburg	48	12	36 (5)	131:190	21

== Playoffs ==
Semifinals
1	Vienna Capitals	3
4	EC VSV	0
2	EC KAC	3
3	HC Innsbruck	2

Finals
1	Vienna Capitals	4
2	EC KAC	3
