= 1992–93 Austrian Hockey League season =

Austrian ice hockey league season

The 1992–93 Austrian Hockey League season was the 63rd season of the Austrian Hockey League, the top level of ice hockey in Austria. Six teams participated in the league, and EC VSV won the championship.

== Regular season ==
Place	Team	GP	W	T	L	GF–GA	Pts (Bonus)
1	EC VSV	20	11	3	6	82:66	29 (4)
2	EC Graz	20	8	7	5	74:61	26 (3)
3	EK Zell am See	20	10	3	7	66:55	24 (1)
4	EV Innsbruck	20	8	5	7	69:62	21 (0)
5	EC KAC	20	5	3	10	75:71	14 (0)
6	VEU Feldkirch	20	2	3	15	64:105	9 (2)

== Playoffs ==
Semifinals
1	EC VSV	3
4	Innsbruck	0
2	EC Graz	3
3	Zell am See	0

Final
1	EC VSV	3
3	EC Graz	0

=== Semifinals ===
Series	Score	Match 1	Match 2	Match 3	Match 4	Match 5
EC VSV (1) - Innsbruck (4)	3:0	6:2	7:1	6:2		
EC Graz (2) - Zell am See (3)	3:0	6:3	4:3	7:0		

=== Final ===
Series	Score	Match 1	Match 2	Match 3	Match 4	Match 5
EC VSV (1) - EC Graz (2)	3:0	6:0	3:1	3:1		
