= 1998–99 Austrian Hockey League season =

Austrian ice hockey season

The 1998–99 Austrian Hockey League season was the 69th season of the Austrian Hockey League, the top level of ice hockey in Austria. Four teams participated in the league, and EC VSV won the championship.

== Regular season ==
Place	Team	GP	W	L (OT)	GF–GA	Pts(Bonus)
1	EC VSV	12	8	4 (1)	43:33	21 (4)
2	EC KAC	12	7	5 (0)	43:33	17 (3)
3	Wiener EV	12	5	7 (2)	35:46	14 (2)
4	VEU Feldkirch	12	4	8 (0)	41:50	9 (1)

== Playoffs ==
Semifinals
1	EC VSV	4
4	VEU Feldkirch	1
2	EC KAC	4
3	Wiener EV	0

Final
1	EC VSV	4
2	EC KAC	2
