= Vienna Capitals =

- City: Vienna, Austria
- League: ICE Hockey League; 2001–
- Founded: 2001; 25 years ago
- Home arena: Steffl Arena (Capacity: 7,022)
- Colors
- Owner: Hans Schmid
- General manager: Franz Kalla
- Head coach: Marc Habscheid
- Captain: Mario Fischer
- Website: Vienna Capitals

Franchise history
- 2001–2011: EV Vienna Capitals
- 2011–2017: UPC Vienna Capitals
- 2017–2019: Vienna Capitals
- 2019–: SPUSU Vienna Capitals

Championships
- Austrian Champions: 2 (2005, 2017)

The Vienna Capitals are an Austrian professional ice hockey team that participate in the ICE Hockey League. Founded in 2001, the Capitals play their home games in Vienna, Austria, at Steffl Arena. In the 2004–05 season, the Capitals claimed their first Austrian Championship in defeating EC KAC.

== History ==
The Vienna Capitals were founded in 2001, after the disbandment of Wiener EV in 2000, to continue the legacy of ice hockey which has been present in the federal capital since 1914. They began competition in the EBEL in the 2001–02 season, under coach Kurt Harand. With good performances, they established themselves in mid-table and finished the end of the regular season in fourth place. In the quarterfinals, the Capitals swept the Graz 99ers 4: 0 before losing in a sweep to EHC Linz in the semifinals.

In their fourth year of competition, with Jim Boni now the head coach after the disappointment of the previous seasons and a revised squad, the Capitals claimed their first Austrian title in the 2003–04 season. Behind the acquisition of goaltender Frédéric Chabot, the team managed to form a tight-knit unit and ended the regular season top of the league with eight points ahead of the runner-up, The EC KAC. In the semifinals, the Capitals defeated EC VSV in four games and met EC KAC in the final. The first six games of the final series were won by the respective away team, before Vienna won the seventh game 6-2 for their first league title in their history, and the first Viennese club to win in 43 years.

Logo of the Capitals from 2001 to 2011.

In the following seasons, the Capitals made repeat semi-finals appearances; however, in more recent years the Capitals would suffer from a lack of developing prospects compared to other Bundesliga teams. This was because Vienna did not offer a consistent training facility, and team affiliate EHC Vienna ceasing its partnership. Beginning in the 2007–08 season, the league enforced a scheme that allowed each EBEL team the commitment of only five transfer card players; as a substitute, the so-called points rule was introduced. With the Capitals handcuffed by the lack of available talent Capitals president Hans Schmid tried abolishing the points rule in order to freely acquire players in the future. This sparked heated discussions among the clubs, where it was argued according to the EU labor rules that every hockey player should be allowed free choice of employment, of which any regulations would be illegal.

In preparation for the 2011–12 season, the Capitals competed in the 2011 European Trophy for the first time in franchise history. They would win just 1 game out of 8 to finish last in their division.

== Venue ==
The home games of the Capitals were played to crowds of up to 4,500 spectators at the comprehensive Albert Schultz Eishalle in Vienna's Danube City. In February 2009 it was announced that the capacity of the hall would be expanded to 7,000 spectators with a retractable roof. Renovation work began after the 2008–09 season and was completed before the 2010–11 season to the cost of 40 million euros. In addition to increasing seating capacity, a parking garage was built and new video screens and VIP boxes were installed.

The Capitals have been the EBEL's best drawing club in attendance, pulling in an average of 4,800 over the years.

== Players ==
=== Current roster ===
Updated 5 September 2024.

No.	Nat	Player	Pos	S/G	Age	Acquired	Birthplace
10	(Austria)	Patrick Antal	C	L	25	2016	Vienna, Austria
33	(Austria)	Mathias Böhm	F	L	23	2019	Vienna, Austria
33	(United States)	Seamus Donohue	D	L	30	2023	North Oaks, Minnesota, United States
55	(United States)	Jack Dougherty	D	R	30	2024	Saint Paul, Minnesota, United States
50	(Austria)	Mario Fischer (C)	D	L	37	2012	Vienna, Austria
61	(Canada)	Zane Franklin	C	R	27	2023	Marwayne, Alberta, Canada
54	(Austria)	Nils Granitz	F	L	23	2022	Vienna, Austria
25	(Canada)	Jérémy Grégoire	C	R	30	2022	Sherbrooke, Quebec, Canada
5	(Austria)	Dominic Hackl	D	L	29	2014	Vienna, Austria
96	(Austria)	Nikolaus Hartl	RW	R	34	2017	Zell am See, Austria
91	(Austria)	Dominique Heinrich (A)	D	L	36	2023	Vienna, Austria
26	(Canada)	Evan Jasper	C	L	34	2024	Whitby, Ontario, Canada
21	(Canada)	Brett Kemp	C	R	26	2024	Yorkton, Saskatchewan, Canada
20	(United States)	Peter Krieger	C	L	32	2024	Oakdale, Minnesota, United States
37	(Austria)	Christof Kromp	LW	L	28	2021	Villach, Austria
41	(United States)	Tyler Parks	G	R	34	2024	Imperial, Missouri, United States
2	(Austria)	Lukas Piff	D	L	25	2016	Vienna, Austria
40	(Austria)	Bernhard Posch	D	L	25	2021	Vienna, Austria
19	(Slovenia)	Aljaž Predan	C	L	26	2024	Ptuj, Slovenia
3	(Austria)	Armin Preiser	C	R	25	2016	Vienna, Austria
–	(United States)	Willie Raskob	D	R	31	2024	Hastings, Minnesota, United States
9	(Austria)	Leon Wallner	LW	R	24	2023	Vienna, Austria
69	(Austria)	Leon Widhalm	F	L	23	2021	Vienna, Austria
88	(Canada)	Jason Willms	C	L	27	2024	Kitchener, Ontario, Canada
30	(Austria)	Sebastian Wraneschitz	G	L	24	2023	Vienna, Austria
