= EC VSV =

EC iDM Wärmepumpen VSV
- Nickname: Die Adler (The Eagles)
- City: Villach, Carinthia, Austria
- League: ICE Hockey League; 1977–present
- Founded: 1923; 103 years ago
- Home arena: Villacher Stadthalle (Capacity: 4,500)
- Colors
- Owner: EC VSV GmbH
- Website: www.ecvsv.at

Franchise history
- 1923–: EC VSV

Championships
- Austrian champions: 6 (1981, 1992, 1993, 1999, 2002, 2006)

EC iDM Wärmepumpen VSV are an ice hockey team in the ICE Hockey League. They play their home games at Stadthalle (capacity approximately 4,500 spectators) in Villach, Austria. The team colors are blue and white. Their mascot is an eagle - Villach's coat of arms represents an eagle's claw.

== History ==
By winning the second divisions title in the 1976–77 season EC VSV gained automatic promotion to Austria's highest league and has tenured since. Following rival team, EC KAC, Villacher is the second oldest club in the EBEL. Although the team finished last in their debut season at the top level (a primary reason why head coach Karol Havasi was replaced by player-coach Ryan D'Arcy by the end of the season), some of their young players, led by Leo Sivec, already showed good promise. In their second season they took the fifth place, the main problem was the vacant coaching job, which was initially filled by Adalbert and Saint John, by the end of the season by injured Bart Crashley.

After missing the playoffs three times in a row, in the 1980–81 season, Villach finally achieved their league title success. Thanks to the youth training under Hermann Knoll and an increased incorporation of the young players (Sivec the oldest residents at that time was just 23 years of age) the EC VSV finished the regular season up to second place. The Final round against the Wiener EV was won narrowly. The following year, however behind Sivec missed presence due to injury most of the season, Villach finished 5th in both the regular season and playoffs.

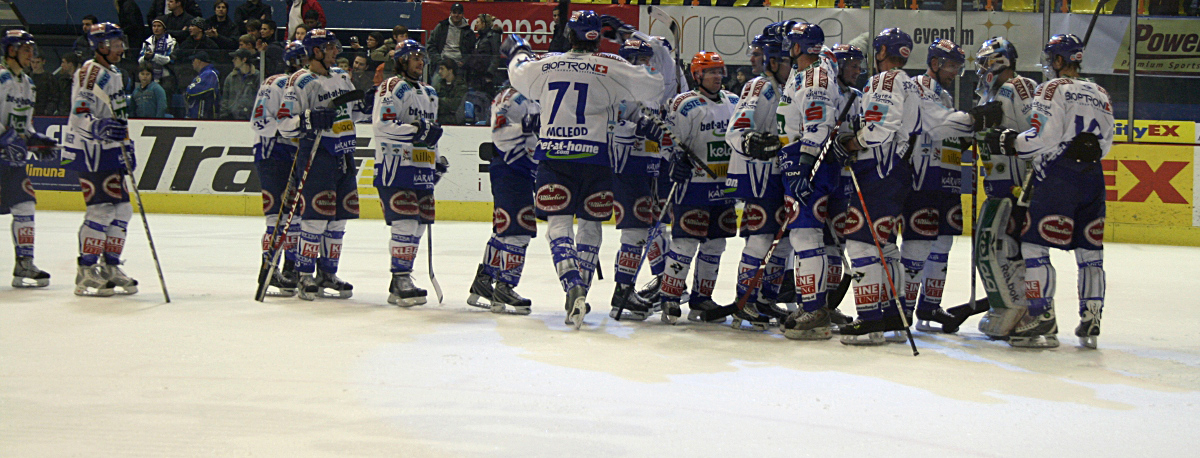
EC VSV in Zagreb

During the last decade of the 20th century EC VSV established themselves as a competitive outfit claiming two early Austrian Championships in 1992 and 1993, in a period when VEU Feldkirch dominated the action in the Austrian Hockey. After struggling against local rivals EC KAC in the playoffs. it was not until the 1998–99 season in which Villach could get past Klagenfurt in the finals again and win their fourth title.

Villacher secured its last title success, it sixth, in the 2005–06, under coach Greg Holst. They won the title after a dominant regular season, alongside EC Red Bull Salzburg. The two teams met each other in the finals as expected with VSV earning 4: 2 series win. A large influence in helping VSV earn the 2006 title were due to Dany Bousquet, who led the club and league in points with 47 goals and 86 points. His greatest success of the season was certainly the decisive goal in the deciding final match against Salzburg in overtime. Goalkeeper Gert Prohaska finished with a save percentage of 92.85%, a clear margin from second place in the league.

In the following season, on 20 February 2007 marked the end of the longest winning streak at 17 between Villach and rivals KAC in the Carinthian Hockey derby. EC KAC had not recorded a win in almost two years over their rivals.

== Honours ==
- Austrian Championships:
  - Winners (6) : 1981, 1992, 1993, 1999, 2002, 2006
- Austrian National League:
  - Winners (1) : 1977

== Players ==
=== Current roster ===
Updated 2 September 2024

No.	Nat	Player	Pos	S/G	Age	Acquired	Birthplace
74	(United States)	Max Coatta	RW	R	32	2024	Minnetonka, Minnesota, United States
21	(Austria)	Tim Geifes	LW	L	23	2022	Wiener Neustadt, Austria
16	(Canada)	Kevin Hancock	LW	L	28	2023	Mississauga, Ontario, Canada
96	(United States)	Patrick Holway	D	R	30	2024	Cohasset, Massachusetts, United States
72	(Canada)	John Hughes	F	R	38	2021	Whitby, Ontario, Canada
95	(Croatia)	Mark Katic	D	L	37	2023	Timmins, Ontario, Canada
1	(United States)	Jean-Philippe Lamoureux	G	L	42	2022	Grand Forks, North Dakota, United States
42	(Austria)	Benjamin Lazinger	RW	R	26	2016	Villach, Austria
–	(Austria)	Florian Lanzinger	W	R	21	2024	Villach, Austria
77	(Austria)	Philipp Lindner (A)	D	L	31	2021	Innsbruck, Austria
2	(Canada)	Dylan MacPherson	D	R	28	2023	Redcliff, Alberta, Canada
78	(Austria)	Felix Maxa	C	L	28	2017	Vienna, Austria
26	(Netherlands)	Guus van Nes	LW	L	29	2024	Dordrecht, Netherlands
12	(United States)	Chase Pearson	C	L	29	2024	Cornwall, Ontario, Canada
9	(Austria)	Alexander Rauchenwald (A)	C	L	33	2021	Villach, Austria
8	(Austria)	Maximilian Rebernig	F	L	26	2021	Oberndorf, Austria
81	(Austria)	Marco Richter	LW	L	30	2021	Vienna, Austria
22	(Russia)	Nikita Scherbak	LW	L	30	2024	Moscow, Russia
37	(Austria)	René Swette	G	L	38	2023	Lustenau, Austria
14	(Austria)	Johannes Tschurnig	F	L	22	2020	Villach, Austria
10	(Austria)	Thomas Vallant	D	R	30	2024	Wolfsberg, Austria
46	(Canada)	Alex Wall	D	L	35	2023	St. John's, Newfoundland and Labrador, Canada
40	(Austria)	Elias Wallenta	F	L	27	2022	Hohenems, Austria
91	(Austria)	Niklas Wetzl	D	L	25	2022	Steyr, Austria
–	(Austria)	Paolo Wieltschnig	W	L	23	2024	Villach, Austria
