= Greg Holst =

Canadian-Austrian ice hockey player and coach

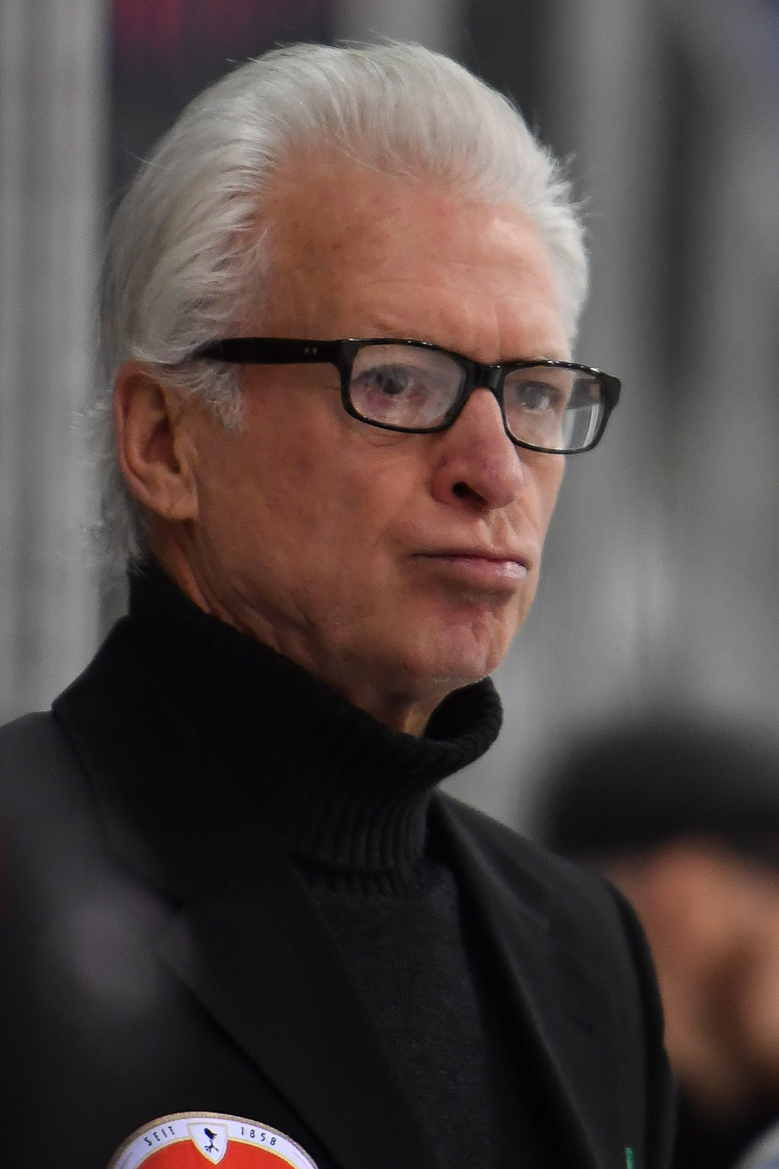
- Holst in 2016
- Born: February 21, 1954 (age 72) Montreal, Quebec, Canada
- Height: 5 ft 10 in (178 cm)
- Weight: 170 lb (77 kg; 12 st 2 lb)
- Position: Centre
- Shot: Left
- Played for: New York Rangers; Innsbrucker EV; Wiener EV; EC Salzburg; Villacher SV; EC Graz
- National team: Austria
- NHL draft: 139th overall, 1974; New York Rangers
- WHA draft: 95th overall, 1974; San Diego Mariners
- Playing career: 1974–1993

Gregory Holst (born February 21, 1954) is a Canadian-born Austrian ice hockey coach and a former player. He played eleven games in the National Hockey League with the New York Rangers between 1975 and 1977. The rest of his career, which lasted from 1974 to 1993, was mainly spent in the Austrian Hockey League. A naturalized Austrian citizen, Holst played for the Austrian national team in four World Championships between 1982 and 1986. After retiring he turned to coaching, and worked in the Austrian league and with the Austrian national team.

== Playing career ==
Holst played at the University of New Brunswick until 1973. He is a member of UNB's 1970's "All-Decade" team. He then enjoyed a highly productive 1973-74 season with the Kingston Canadians of the Ontario Junior Hockey League, tallying 33 goals and 47 assists in 62 contests. Holst then continued his scoring pace the following season with 33 goals and 37 assists in 62 games for the Winston-Salem Polar Twins of the Southern Hockey League.

He made his NHL debut with the New York Rangers during the 1975-76 season and mostly spent time with their affiliate in the American Hockey League (AHL), the Providence Reds, tallying 37 goals and 44 assists in 69 games that season en route to AHL Rookie of the Year honors. He played nine more NHL contests for the Rangers over the following two years, splitting time between the Rangers and AHL's New Haven Nighthawks.

In 1978 Holst joined Innsbrucker EV of Austria's top division, the Bundesliga. He became one of the most famous Canadian players in Austria and dominated the league while playing for Innsbruck, Wiener EV, Salzburger EC, Villacher SV and EC Graz over the years. Holst received Austrian citizenship and made the Austrian national team, representing the country at four World Championships (Group B). He finished his active career in 1993. Holst played 540 games in the Austrian league, scoring 522 goals. He had his jersey number 14 retired by Innsbrucker EV.

== Coaching career ==
After the end of his playing days, Holst returned to his native Canada, where he started a hockey school, and then returned to Austria to pursue his coaching career. He coached second-division side EHC Wattens in 1996-97, before joining the coaching staff of the Austrian ice hockey federation in 1997. Until 2002, he served in various positions, including head coach of the U18 and U20 national teams and assistant coach of the men’s national team.

Holst was named head coach of EC VSV of the Austrian top-tier in 2002. During his six-year tenure, he led the club to the 2006 Austrian championship and to the finals in 2003, 2004, 2007.

He took over the head coaching job at HC TWK Innsbruck in December 2008 and remained in that position until the remainder of the season. Holst served as head coach of Ritten Sport of the Italian Serie A in 2011-12 and returned to EC VSV in June 2015 to become director of the club's youth program. In November 2015, he took over the head coaching job.

In November 2018, Holst was named head coach of EK Zell am See of the Alps Hockey League. He coached for one season.

== Career statistics ==
=== Regular season and playoffs ===
			Regular season					Playoffs
Season	Team	League	GP	G	A	Pts	PIM	GP	G	A	Pts	PIM
1971–72	University of New Brunswick	CIAU	18	7	7	14	38	—	—	—	—	—
1972–73	University of New Brunswick	CIAU	19	21	11	32	82	—	—	—	—	—
1973–74	Kingston Canadians	OHA	62	33	47	80	121	—	—	—	—	—
1974–75	Winston-Salem Polar Twins	SHL	62	33	37	70	112	7	5	6	11	42
1974–75	Port Huron Flags	IHL	8	1	0	1	6	—	—	—	—	—
1975–76	New York Rangers	NHL	2	0	0	0	0	—	—	—	—	—
1975–76	Providence Reds	AHL	69	37	44	81	77	3	0	0	0	22
1976–77	New York Rangers	NHL	5	0	0	0	0	—	—	—	—	—
1976–77	New Haven Nighthawks	AHL	65	21	25	46	90	6	2	3	5	2
1977–78	New York Rangers	NHL	4	0	0	0	0	—	—	—	—	—
1977–78	New Haven Nighthawks	AHL	65	15	25	40	44	15	6	7	13	6
1978–79	ECS Innsbruck	AUT	34	42	26	68	—	—	—	—	—	—
1979–80	ECS Innsbruck	AUT	39	37	36	73	63	—	—	—	—	—
1980–81	ECS Innsbruck	AUT	33	28	48	76	70	—	—	—	—	—
1981–82	Wiener EV	AUT	38	41	19	60	—	—	—	—	—	—
1982–83	ECS Innsbruck	AUT	34	58	41	99	—	—	—	—	—	—
1983–84	ECS Innsbruck	AUT	28	36	32	68	—	—	—	—	—	—
1984–85	Innsbrucker EV	AUT	39	44	57	101	36	—	—	—	—	—
1985–86	Innsbrucker EV	AUT	36	27	24	51	83	—	—	—	—	—
1986–87	Innsbrucker EV	AUT	38	39	36	75	50	—	—	—	—	—
1987–88	EC Salzburg	AUT	34	31	20	51	24	—	—	—	—	—
1988–89	Villacher EV	AUT	46	38	41	79	—	—	—	—	—	—
1989–90	Innsbrucker EV	AUT	33	36	39	75	55	—	—	—	—	—
1990–91	Innsbrucker EV	AUT	34	19	22	41	45	—	—	—	—	—
1991–92	Innsbrucker EV	AUT	42	21	30	51	21	—	—	—	—	—
1992–93	EC Graz	AUT	25	4	9	13	12	—	—	—	—	—
AUT totals			533	501	480	981	—	—	—	—	—	—
NHL totals			11	0	0	0	0	—	—	—	—	—

=== International ===
Year	Team	Event	GP	G	A	Pts	PIM
1982	Austria	WC-B	7	2	3	5	6
1983	Austria	WC-B	7	8	8	16	0
1985	Austria	WC-B	7	2	1	3	10
1986	Austria	WC-B	7	3	3	6	0
Senior totals			28	15	15	30	16
