= Kelly Greenbank =

Austrian ice hockey player

- Born: 17 November 1955 (age 70) Moosomin, Saskatchewan, Canada
- Height: 5 ft 11 in (180 cm)
- Weight: 175 lb (79 kg; 12 st 7 lb)
- Position: Right wing
- Shot: Right
- Played for: Nova Scotia Voyageurs; Rhode Island Reds; Fort Worth Texans; Oklahoma City Stars; VEU Feldkirch
- National team: Austria
- NHL draft: 34th overall, 1975; Montreal Canadiens
- WHA draft: 20th overall, 1975; Cleveland Crusaders
- Playing career: 1975–1992

Kelly Greenbank (born 17 November 1955) is a Canadian-born Austrian former professional ice hockey right winger.

Greenbank was drafted 34th overall by the Montreal Canadiens in the 1975 NHL Amateur Draft and 20th overall by the Cleveland Crusaders in the 1975 WHA Amateur Draft but never played in either league. Instead, he played in the American Hockey League for the Nova Scotia Voyageurs and the Central Hockey League for the Fort Worth Texans and the Oklahoma City Stars between 1975 and 1980.

In 1980, Greenbank moved to Austria to sign for VEU Feldkirch. He remained with Feldkirch right up until his retirement in 1992, playing thirteen seasons with the team. He became an Austrian citizen during his spell and became eligible to play for the Austrian national team, with whom he competed in the men's tournaments at the 1984 Winter Olympics and the 1988 Winter Olympics.

== Career statistics ==
			Regular season					Playoffs
Season	Team	League	GP	G	A	Pts	PIM	GP	G	A	Pts	PIM
1972–73	Brandon Wheat Kings	WCHL	67	33	46	79	8	—	—	—	—	—
1973–74	Brandon Wheat Kings	WCHL	17	5	8	13	2	—	—	—	—	—
1973–74	Winnipeg Clubs	WCHL	53	26	31	57	13	—	—	—	—	—
1974–75	Winnipeg Clubs	WCHL	62	50	51	101	51	—	—	—	—	—
1975–76	Nova Scotia Voyageurs	AHL	62	12	32	44	19	—	—	—	—	—
1976–77	Nova Scotia Voyageurs	AHL	28	4	11	15	6	—	—	—	—	—
1976–77	Rhode Island Reds	AHL	52	20	25	45	12	—	—	—	—	—
1977–78	Fort Worth Texans	CHL	19	6	9	15	2	14	7	4	11	6
1978–79	Oklahoma City Stars	CHL	76	28	34	62	20	—	—	—	—	—
1979–80	Oklahoma City Stars	CHL	13	4	3	7	2	—	—	—	—	—
1979–80	VEU Feldkirch	Austria	29	36	38	74	36	—	—	—	—	—
1980–81	VEU Feldkirch	Austria	22	29	30	59	12	—	—	—	—	—
1981–82	VEU Feldkirch	Austria	—	—	—	—	—	—	—	—	—	—
1982–83	VEU Feldkirch	Austria	—	—	—	—	—	—	—	—	—	—
1983–84	VEU Feldkirch	Austria	—	—	—	—	—	—	—	—	—	—
1984–85	VEU Feldkirch	Austria	37	29	27	56	—	—	—	—	—	—
1985–86	VEU Feldkirch	Austria	44	33	49	82	27	—	—	—	—	—
1986–87	VEU Feldkirch	Austria	38	17	23	40	40	—	—	—	—	—
1987–88	VEU Feldkirch	Austria	34	11	24	35	14	—	—	—	—	—
1988–89	VEU Feldkirch	Austria	46	15	24	39	—	—	—	—	—	—
1989–90	VEU Feldkirch	Austria	28	15	15	30	8	—	—	—	—	—
1990–91	VEU Feldkirch	Austria	37	17	21	38	18	—	—	—	—	—
1991–92	VEU Feldkirch	Austria	41	12	13	25	18	—	—	—	—	—
AHL totals			142	36	68	104	37	—	—	—	—	—
Austria totals			356	214	264	478	173	—	—	—	—	—
