= Edward Lebler =

Austrian ice hockey player

- Born: 20 May 1958 (age 66); Vanderhoof, British Columbia, Canada
- Height: 5 ft 10 in (178 cm)
- Weight: 181 lb (82 kg; 12 st 13 lb)
- Position: Forward
- Shot: Left
- Played for: HC Salzburg; Klagenfurter AC; Villacher SV; EK Zell am See
- National team: Austria
- Playing career: 1981–1993

Edward Lebler (born 20 May 1958) is an Austrian ice hockey player. He competed in the men's tournaments at the 1984 Winter Olympics and the 1988 Winter Olympics.

== Career statistics ==
			Regular season					Playoffs
Season	Team	League	GP	G	A	Pts	PIM	GP	G	A	Pts	PIM
1975–76	Langley Lords	BCJHL	—	26	43	69	33	—	—	—	—	—
1976–77	Langley Thunder	BCJHL	60	52	44	96	52	—	—	—	—	—
1977–78	Langley Thunder	BCJHL	—	—	—	—	—	—	—	—	—	—
1978–79	University of Wisconsin	NCAA	24	1	4	5	17	—	—	—	—	—
1979–80	University of Wisconsin	NCAA	36	10	14	24	18	—	—	—	—	—
1980–81	University of Wisconsin	NCAA	42	28	24	52	20	—	—	—	—	—
1981–82	HC Salzburg	Austria	28	40	22	62	—	—	—	—	—	—
1982–83	Klagenfurter AC	Austria	—	—	—	—	—	—	—	—	—	—
1983–84	Klagenfurter AC	Austria	—	—	—	—	—	—	—	—	—	—
1984–85	Klagenfurter AC	Austria	39	46	38	84	—	—	—	—	—	—
1985–86	Klagenfurter AC	Austria	44	46	47	93	20	—	—	—	—	—
1986–87	Klagenfurter AC	Austria	39	36	30	66	12	—	—	—	—	—
1987–88	Klagenfurter AC	Austria	34	33	16	49	14	—	—	—	—	—
1988–89	Klagenfurter AC	Austria	42	41	43	84	—	—	—	—	—	—
1989–90	Villacher SV	Austria	39	36	36	72	16	—	—	—	—	—
1990–91	Villacher SV	Austria	44	31	32	63	10	—	—	—	—	—
1991–92	Villacher SV	Austria	25	9	7	16	—	—	—	—	—	—
1992–93	EK Zell am See	Austria	52	33	51	84	8	—	—	—	—	—
Austria totals			386	351	322	673	80	—	—	—	—	—
