= Gerhard Pusnik =

Austrian ice hockey player

Personal information
- Nationality: Austrian
- Born: 16 October 1966 (age 59) Feldkirch, Austria

Sport
- Sport: Ice hockey

Gerhard Pusnik (born 16 October 1966) is an Austrian ice hockey player. He competed in the men's tournaments at the 1988 Winter Olympics, the 1994 Winter Olympics and the 1998 Winter Olympics.

== Career statistics ==
=== Regular season and playoffs ===
			Regular season					Playoffs
Season	Team	League	GP	G	A	Pts	PIM	GP	G	A	Pts	PIM
1982–83	VEU Feldkirch	AUT						—	—	—	—	—
1983–84	VEU Feldkirch	AUT						—	—	—	—	—
1984–85	VEU Feldkirch	AUT						—	—	—	—	—
1985–86	VEU Feldkirch	AUT	44	24	14	38	89	—	—	—	—	—
1986–87	VEU Feldkirch	AUT	39	17	24	41	49	—	—	—	—	—
1987–88	VEU Feldkirch	AUT	32	18	23	41	38	—	—	—	—	—
1988–89	VEU Feldkirch	AUT	46	23	36	59		—	—	—	—	—
1989–90	VEU Feldkirch	AUT	36	36	62	98	80	—	—	—	—	—
1990–91	VEU Feldkirch	AUT	37	24	28	52	85	—	—	—	—	—
1991–92	VEU Feldkirch	AUT	42	27	29	56	98	—	—	—	—	—
1992–93	VEU Feldkirch	AUT	50	34	45	79	94	—	—	—	—	—
1993–94	VEU Feldkirch	AUT	55	33	36	69	76	—	—	—	—	—
1994–95	VEU Feldkirch	AUT	41	23	35	58		—	—	—	—	—
1995–96	VEU Feldkirch	AUT	37	28	29	57	48	—	—	—	—	—
1996–97	VEU Feldkirch	AUT	56	23	29	52	54	—	—	—	—	—
1997–98	VEU Feldkirch	AUT	45	13	13	26	36	—	—	—	—	—
1998–99	VEU Feldkirch	AUT	52	18	28	46	83	—	—	—	—	—
1999–2000	VEU Feldkirch	IEHL	3	0	1	1	6	—	—	—	—	—
1999–2000	VEU Feldkirch	AUT	8	2	1	3	0	—	—	—	—	—
2000–01	EHC Black Wings Linz	AUT	45	11	30	41	38	—	—	—	—	—
2001–02	EHC Black Wings Linz	AUT	29	5	15	20	20	13	3	6	9	16
2002–03	VEU Feldkirch	AUT	42	17	27	44	60	3	0	0	0	2
2003–04	VEU Feldkirch	AUT	48	4	8	12	26	—	—	—	—	—
2004–05	VEU Feldkirch	AUT.2	7	2	5	7	10	—	—	—	—	—
AUT totals			787	380	512	892	974	16	3	6	9	18

=== International ===
Year	Team	Event	GP	G	A	Pts	PIM
1984	Austria	EJC B	5	7
1985	Austria	WJC B	7	10	6	16	18
1986	Austria	WJC B	7	12	7	19	18
1987	Austria	WC B	7	1	0	1	4
1988	Austria	OG	6	1	1	2	0
1989	Austria	WC B	7	0	0	0	0
1990	Austria	WC B	7	2	2	4	12
1991	Austria	WC B	7	1	2	3	6
1992	Austria	WC B	7	8	7	15	10
1993	Austria	WC	6	0	1	1	4
1994	Austria	OG	7	2	3	5	4
1994	Austria	WC	6	0	1	1	2
1995	Austria	WC	7	0	1	1	8
1996	Austria	WC	7	0	3	3	6
1997	Austria	OGQ	4	0	0	0	4
1997	Austria	WC B	7	2	5	7	12
1998	Austria	OG	4	1	0	1	18
1998	Austria	WC	3	0	0	0	4
Senior totals			92	18	26	44	94

"Gerhard Puschnik". Elite Prospects.
