= Richard Grenier (ice hockey) =

Canadian-born Austrian ice hockey player

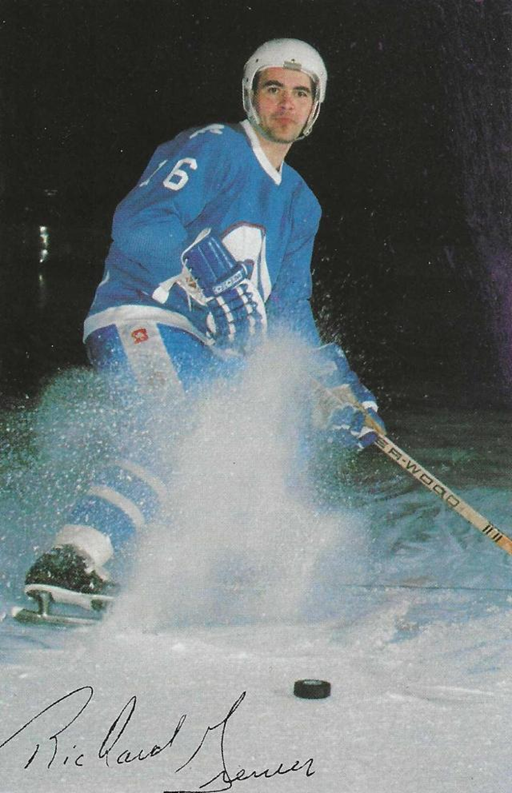
- Grenier in 1976 postcard
- Born: September 18, 1952 (age 73) Montreal, Quebec, Canada
- Height: 5 ft 11 in (180 cm)
- Weight: 170 lb (77 kg; 12 st 2 lb)
- Position: Centre
- Shot: Left
- Played for: New York Islanders; Quebec Nordiques; VEU Feldkirch; Kiekkoreipas; EHC Arosa; Villacher SV; Wiener EV
- National team: Austria
- NHL draft: 65th overall, 1972; New York Islanders
- Playing career: 1972–1990

Richard Grenier (born September 18, 1952) is a Canadian-born Austrian former professional ice hockey centre who played 10 games in the National Hockey League and 34 games in the World Hockey Association.

== Early life ==
Grenier was born in Montreal. As a youth, he played in the 1965 Quebec International Pee-Wee Hockey Tournament with a minor ice hockey team from Saint-Eusèbe, Quebec.

== Career ==
Grenier played 10 games with the New York Islanders, and 34 games in the World Hockey Association with the Quebec Nordiques. The rest of his career, which lasted from 1972 to 1990, was spent in the minor leagues and then in the Austrian Hockey League. A naturalized Austrian, he played for the Austria national team at the 1987 World Championship B Pool.

== Career statistics ==
=== Regular season and playoffs ===
			Regular season					Playoffs
Season	Team	League	GP	G	A	Pts	PIM	GP	G	A	Pts	PIM
1969–70	Rosemont National	QMJHL	6	0	3	3	2	—	—	—	—	—
1969–70	St-Michael Cardinaux	QAHA	—	—	—	—	—	—	—	—	—	—
1970–71	Quebec Remparts	QMJHL	62	23	76	99	74	14	7	7	14	30
1970–71	Quebec Remparts	M-Cup	—	—	—	—	—	7	0	2	2	0
1971–72	Verdun Maple Leafs	QMJHL	61	46	56	102	83	4	2	1	3	4
1972–73	New York Islanders	NHL	10	1	1	2	2	—	—	—	—	—
1972–73	New Haven Nighthawks	AHL	66	19	20	39	50	—	—	—	—	—
1973–74	Fort Worth Wings	CHL	70	28	26	54	39	5	2	2	4	6
1974–75	Fort Worth Texans	CHL	55	11	14	25	32	—	—	—	—	—
1974–75	New Haven Nighthawks	AHL	18	3	5	8	5	—	—	—	—	—
1975–76	Beauce Jaros	NAHL	73	77	83	160	82	12	14	4	18	12
1976–77	Quebec Nordiques	WHA	34	11	9	20	4	—	—	—	—	—
1976–77	Maine Nordiques	NAHL	41	25	23	48	12	12	12	6	18	2
1977–78	Binghamton Dusters	AHL	75	46	30	76	37	—	—	—	—	—
1978–79	Binghamton Dusters	AHL	68	37	27	64	36	10	6	4	10	13
1979–80	VEU Feldkirch	AUT	34	60	43	103	68	—	—	—	—	—
1979–80	Nova Scotia Voyageurs	AHL	11	6	4	10	0	6	1	3	4	2
1980–81	Kiekkoreipas	FIN	36	29	21	50	36	—	—	—	—	—
1981–82	EHC Arosa	NLA	34	40	18	58	—	—	—	—	—	—
1982–83	EHC Arosa	NLA	36	39	9	48	17	—	—	—	—	—
1983–84	Villacher SV	AUT	38	52	63	115	—	—	—	—	—	—
1984–85	Villacher SV	AUT	32	29	45	74	38	—	—	—	—	—
1985–86	Villacher SV	AUT	41	36	52	88	30	—	—	—	—	—
1986–87	Villacher SV	AUT	20	14	21	35	22	—	—	—	—	—
1987–88	Wiener EV	AUT	34	19	26	45	24	—	—	—	—	—
1988–89	Wiener EV	AUT	38	11	25	36	—	—	—	—	—	—
1989–90	Wiener EV	AUT	37	28	26	54	10	—	—	—	—	—
AUT totals			274	249	301	550	192	—	—	—	—	—
WHA totals			34	11	9	20	4	—	—	—	—	—
NHL totals			10	1	1	2	2	—	—	—	—	—

=== International ===
Year	Team	Event	GP	G	A	Pts	PIM
1987	Austria	WC-B	7	3	4	7	2
Senior totals			7	3	4	7	2
