= Robin Sadler =

Canadian-Austrian ice hockey player

- Born: March 31, 1955 (age 71) Vancouver, British Columbia, Canada
- Height: 6 ft 2 in (188 cm)
- Weight: 181 lb (82 kg; 12 st 13 lb)
- Position: Defence
- Shot: Left
- National team: Austria
- NHL draft: 9th overall, 1975; Montreal Canadiens
- WHA draft: 18th overall, 1975; Michigan Stags
- Playing career: 1976–1988

Robin Sadler (born March 31, 1955) is a Canadian and Austrian former professional ice hockey defenceman. He was drafted in the first round, ninth overall, of the 1975 NHL Amateur Draft by the Montreal Canadiens; in addition, he was drafted in the second round, 18th overall, of the 1975 WHA Amateur Draft by the Michigan Stags. However, Sadler never played in either the National Hockey League (NHL) or the World Hockey Association despite signing with both leagues (the Montreal Canadiens and the Edmonton Oilers respectively). Unhappy with the demands of professional hockey in North America, Sadler established a successful career in Europe instead, eventually representing Austria internationally.

== Career statistics ==
=== Regular season and playoffs ===
			Regular season					Playoffs
Season	Team	League	GP	G	A	Pts	PIM	GP	G	A	Pts	PIM
1974–75	Edmonton Oil Kings	WCHL	66	32	61	93	103	—	—	—	—	—
1976–77	Västra Frölunda IF	SEL	36	6	8	14	12	—	—	—	—	—
1977–78	Nova Scotia Voyageurs	AHL	9	1	5	6	6	—	—	—	—	—
1978–79	HC Salzburg	AUT
1979–80	Innsbrucker EV	AUT	40	19	47	66	47	—	—	—	—	—
1980–81	Delta Hurry Kings	BCSHL
1980–81	Feenstra Flyers	NLD
1981–82	Nijmegen Tigers	NLD
1982–83	Feenstra Flyers	NLD	43	20	45	65		—	—	—	—	—
1983–84	Kapfenberger SV	AUT
1985–86	Wiener EV	AUT	40	8	42	50	42	—	—	—	—	—
1986–87	Wiener EV	AUT	41	19	25	44	38	—	—	—	—	—
1987–88	Wiener EV	AUT	32	4	27	31	18	—	—	—	—	—
AUT totals			153	50	141	191	145	—	—	—	—	—

=== International ===
Year	Team	Event	GP	G	A	Pts	PIM
1975	Canada	WJC
1987	Austria	WC B	7	0	4	4	6
1988	Austria	OG	6	2	1	3	4

== Awards ==
- WCHL All-Star Team – 1975

Preceded by Gord McTavish	Montreal Canadiens first-round draft pick 1975	Succeeded by Pierre Mondou
