= Brian Hill (ice hockey) =

Austrian-Canadian ice hockey player (born 1957)

- Born: January 12, 1957 (age 69) Regina, Saskatchewan, Canada
- Height: 6 ft 0 in (183 cm)
- Weight: 175 lb (79 kg; 12 st 7 lb)
- Position: Right wing
- Shot: Right
- Played for: Hartford Whalers
- National team: Austria
- NHL draft: 31st overall, 1977; Atlanta Flames
- WHA draft: 43rd overall, 1977; New England Whalers
- Playing career: 1977–1989

Brian Nelson Hill (born January 12, 1957) is a Canadian-born Austrian former ice hockey right winger. He played 19 games in the National Hockey League with the Hartford Whalers during the 1979–80 season. He moved to Europe in 1980 and spent eight seasons playing in the Austrian Hockey League before retiring in 1988. While there Hill became an Austrian citizen and played for the Austrian national team at the 1986 and 1987 World Championship B Pools.

== Playing career ==
Hill played junior hockey in the Western Canada Hockey League for the Medicine Hat Tigers, scoring 53 goals and 51 assists for 104 points in his final year in 1976-77. Hill was drafted 31st overall by the Atlanta Flames in the 1977 NHL amateur draft and 43rd overall by the New England Whalers in the 1977 WHA Amateur Draft. Hill spent the next two seasons in the Central Hockey League for the Tulsa Oilers before he was claimed in the 1979 NHL Expansion Draft by the Hartford Whalers. He would spend just one season in the Whalers organization, splitting his time with the American Hockey League's Springfield Indians, and played 19 games for the Whalers, scoring a goal and an assist.

In 1980, Hill moved to the European leagues, with spells in Germany for EV Füssen and Austria for VEU Feldkirch and EHC Lustenau.

== International play ==
Hill later obtained Austrian citizenship and represented them in the World Championship "B" Pool in 1986 and 1987. He had 5 points in 12 games.

== Career statistics ==
=== Regular season and playoffs ===
			Regular season					Playoffs
Season	Team	League	GP	G	A	Pts	PIM	GP	G	A	Pts	PIM
1974–75	Estevan Bruins	SJHL	—	—	—	—	—	—	—	—	—	—
1974–75	Medicine Hat Tigers	WCHL	39	7	5	12	6	5	0	0	0	0
1975–76	Medicine Hat Tigers	WCHL	70	22	24	46	98	9	2	3	5	2
1976–77	Medicine Hat Tigers	WCHL	72	53	51	104	101	4	3	1	4	4
1977–78	Tulsa Oilers	CHL	75	13	26	39	46	7	2	2	4	6
1978–79	Tulsa Oilers	CHL	74	26	27	53	58	—	—	—	—	—
1979–80	Springfield Indians	AHL	45	15	19	34	12	—	—	—	—	—
1979–80	Hartford Whalers	NHL	19	1	1	2	4	—	—	—	—	—
1980–81	EV Füssen	GER	43	27	24	51	59	—	—	—	—	—
1981–82	VEU Feldkirch	AUT	38	26	38	64	—	—	—	—	—	—
1982–83	VEU Feldkirch	AUT	28	35	37	72	—	—	—	—	—	—
1983–84	VEU Feldkirch	AUT	40	55	20	75	—	—	—	—	—	—
1984–85	VEU Feldkirch	AUT	37	36	31	67	40	—	—	—	—	—
1985–86	VEU Feldkirch	AUT	40	35	30	65	35	—	—	—	—	—
1986–87	VEU Feldkirch	AUT	38	22	30	52	38	—	—	—	—	—
1987–88	VEU Feldkirch	AUT	17	3	18	21	30	—	—	—	—	—
1988–89	ATSE Graz	AUT-2	28	35	37	72	—	—	—	—	—	—
AUT totals			238	212	204	416	—	—	—	—	—	—
NHL totals			19	1	1	2	4	—	—	—	—	—

=== International ===
Year	Team	Event	GP	G	A	Pts	PIM
1986	Austria	WC-B	7	3	1	4	2
1987	Austria	WC-B	5	1	0	1	2
Senior totals			12	4	1	5	4
