= 1971–72 Austrian Hockey League season =

Austrian ice hockey season

The 1971–72 Austrian Hockey League season was the 42nd season of the Austrian Hockey League, the top level of ice hockey in Austria. Eight teams participated in the league, and EC KAC won the championship.

== Regular season ==
	Team	GP	W	L	T	GF	GA	Pts
1.	EC KAC	28	22	4	2	178	88	46
2.	Wiener EV	28	16	7	5	133	95	37
3.	WAT Stadlau	28	15	8	5	108	91	35
4.	VEU Feldkirch	28	14	10	4	129	99	32
5.	Innsbrucker EV	28	12	14	2	111	112	26
6.	ATSE Graz	28	9	14	5	95	101	23
7.	EC Kitzbühel	28	9	16	3	83	109	21
8.	EK Zell am See	28	1	25	2	52	194	4
