= Alexander Barinev =

Russian ice hockey player (1952–2021)

Alexander Barinev (9 April 1952 – 27 February 2021) was a Russian ice hockey player. He played for SKA MVO Kalinin, Khimik Voskresensk, Kristall Saratov, HC Spartak Moscow, and VEU Feldkirch.

== Honours ==
- IIHF European Junior Championships
  - (gold) – 1971 (with Soviet Union U-19)
- Soviet Championship League
  - (gold) – 1975–76 (with Spartak Moscow)
  - (bronze) – 1978–79, 1979–80 (with Spartak Moscow)
- Austrian Hockey League
  - (gold) – 1981–82, 1982–83, 1983–84, 1989–90 (with VEU Feldkirch)

== Team staff history ==
Ref.:

- 1984–1985: (Austria) VEU Feldkirch (player-coach)
- 1989–1991: (Austria) VEU Feldkirch (head coach)
- 1991–1994: (Germany) EC Ratingen (head coach)
- 1994–1995: (Germany) EC Bad Tölz (head coach)
- 1997–2000: (Russia) Spartak Moscow (asst. coach)
- 2000–2001: (Russia) Vityaz Podolsk (head coach)
- 2002–2005: (Russia) Spartak Moscow (asst. coach)
- 2008–2009: (Russia) Spartak Moscow-2 (head coach)
- 2009–2010: (Russia) MHK Spartak Moscow (head coach)
