= Bart Crashley =

Canadian ice hockey player

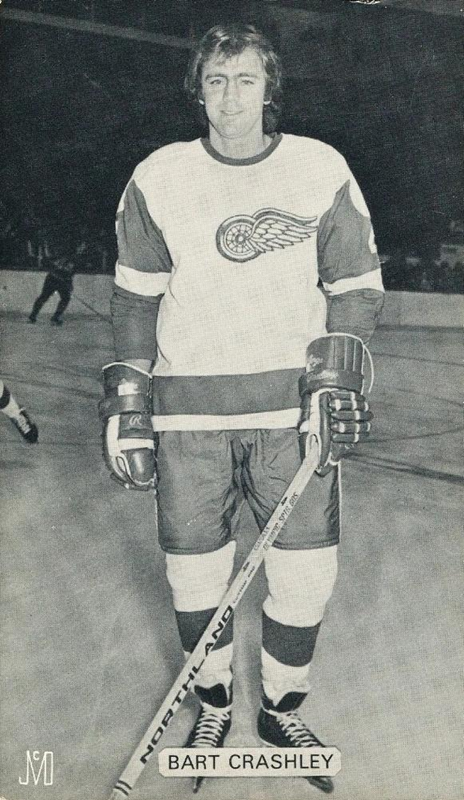
- Born: June 15, 1946 (age 79) Toronto, Ontario, Canada
- Height: 6 ft 0 in (183 cm)
- Weight: 179 lb (81 kg; 12 st 11 lb)
- Position: Defence
- Shot: Right
- Played for: Kansas City Scouts; Los Angeles Kings; Detroit Red Wings
- Playing career: 1964–1980; 1983–1985

Bart Crashley (born June 15, 1946) is a Canadian former professional ice hockey defenceman who played 148 games in the National Hockey League and 140 games in the World Hockey Association. He played for the Detroit Red Wings, Los Angeles Sharks, Kansas City Scouts, and Los Angeles Kings between 1965 and 1976.

== Playing career ==
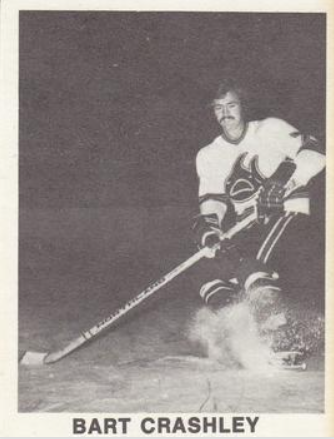
1972 card of Crashley for Los Angeles Sharks

Crashley was a promising rushing defenceman in his rookie year of 1967–68 with Detroit where he wore sweater #15 and was paired with Gary Bergman. His style of play was not encouraged by coach Sid Abel who reportedly instructed Crashley to not carry the puck past his own blueline. Crashley was subsequently traded to Montreal where he played in their farm system.

Crashley was selected by the New York Islanders in 1972 expansion draft, but opted to join Los Angeles Sharks of the World Hockey Association, spending two seasons there. He returned to the NHL in 1974 with the expansion Kansas City Scouts, wearing #4. He returned to Detroit via a trade halfway through that season where he again wore #4. Went to the Los Angeles Kings along with Marcel Dionne in a blockbuster trade. He played four games for the Kings, spending most of the season in the minor leagues.

After two more seasons in the minors Crashley went to Austria, where he served as player-coach of Villacher SV during the 1979–80 season. He retired from playing and coached full time, though returned to play in 1983 with Innsbrucker EV for two seasons before retiring for good in 1985.

== Post-playing career ==
After retiring from playing in 1980 Crashley became a coach in the Austrian Hockey League, and served as player-coach during his comeback from 1983 to 1985. He coached in Austria until 1993. In 1998–99 he was the assistant coach of the Guelph Storm of the Ontario Hockey League, and in 2007–08 coached the Couchiching Terriers of the Ontario Junior Hockey League. He also coached of the Campbellford Rebels of the Empire B Junior C Hockey League in 2012–13.

== Career statistics ==
=== Regular season and playoffs ===
			Regular season					Playoffs
Season	Team	League	GP	G	A	Pts	PIM	GP	G	A	Pts	PIM
1962–63	Hamilton Red Wings	OHA	50	1	16	17	18	5	0	0	0	2
1963–64	Hamilton Red Wings	OHA	46	5	19	24	31	—	—	—	—	—
1963–64	Pittsburgh Hornets	AHL	1	0	0	0	0	—	—	—	—	—
1964–65	Hamilton Red Wings	OHA	56	11	35	46	40	—	—	—	—	—
1965–66	Hamilton Red Wings	OHA	46	8	31	39	55	—	—	—	—	—
1965–66	Detroit Red Wings	NHL	1	0	0	0	0	—	—	—	—	—
1966–67	Memphis Wings	CHL	49	6	26	32	40	7	1	5	6	4
1966–67	Pittsburgh Hornets	AHL	16	4	2	6	8	—	—	—	—	—
1966–67	Detroit Red Wings	NHL	2	0	0	0	2	—	—	—	—	—
1967–68	Detroit Red Wings	NHL	57	2	14	16	18	—	—	—	—	—
1967–68	Fort Worth Wings	CHL	13	0	4	4	16	13	3	9	12	12
1968–69	Fort Worth Wings	CHL	37	6	14	20	40	—	—	—	—	—
1968–69	Detroit Red Wings	NHL	1	0	0	0	0	—	—	—	—	—
1969–70	Montreal Voyageurs	AHL	45	4	9	13	4	7	0	0	0	0
1970–71	Kansas City Blues	CHL	58	5	19	24	28	—	—	—	—	—
1971–72	Dallas Black Hawks	CHL	56	20	38	58	24	6	0	7	7	5
1972–73	Los Angeles Sharks	WHA	70	18	27	45	10	6	0	2	2	2
1973–74	Los Angeles Sharks	WHA	78	4	26	30	16	—	—	—	—	—
1974–75	Kansas City Scouts	NHL	27	3	6	9	10	—	—	—	—	—
1974–75	Detroit Red Wings	NHL	48	2	15	17	14	—	—	—	—	—
1975–76	Fort Worth Texans	CHL	62	11	32	43	61	—	—	—	—	—
1975–76	Los Angeles Kings	NHL	4	0	1	1	6	—	—	—	—	—
1976–77	Fort Worth Texans	CHL	23	4	11	15	10	—	—	—	—	—
1976–77	Springfield Indians	AHL	18	2	3	5	10	—	—	—	—	—
1977–78	Binghamton Dusters	AHL	60	4	17	21	18	—	—	—	—	—
1978–79	Villacher SV	AUT	—	—	—	—	—	—	—	—	—	—
1979–80	Villacher SV	AUT	29	10	24	34	26	—	—	—	—	—
1983–84	Innsbrucker EV	AUT	—	—	—	—	—	—	—	—	—	—
1984–85	Innsbrucker EV	AUT	36	1	18	19	14	—	—	—	—	—
WHA totals			148	22	53	75	26	—	—	—	—	—
NHL totals			140	7	36	43	50	—	—	—	—	—
