= Ken Strong (ice hockey) =

Canadian ice hockey player

- Born: May 9, 1963 (age 61); Toronto, Ontario, Canada
- Height: 5 ft 11 in (180 cm)
- Weight: 185 lb (84 kg; 13 st 3 lb)
- Position: Left wing
- Shot: Left
- Played for: Toronto Maple Leafs; EHC Chur; Villacher SV; HC Gherdëina; Kapfenberger SV
- National team: Austria
- NHL draft: 58th overall, 1981; Philadelphia Flyers
- Playing career: 1983–1997

Kenneth Strong (born May 9, 1963) is a Canadian-born Austrian former professional ice hockey player. He played 15 games in the National Hockey League with the Toronto Maple Leafs from 1983 to 1985. The rest of his career, which lasted from 1983 to 1997, was mainly spent in the Austrian Hockey League. Nationalized as an Austrian citizen, Strong played internationally for the Austrian national team at the 1994 Winter Olympics and three World Championships. His son, Steven Strong, is also an ice hockey player.

== Early life ==
Strong was born in Toronto. As a youth, he played in the 1976 Quebec International Pee-Wee Hockey Tournament with a minor ice hockey team from Mississauga.

== Career ==
Strong played for the Austrian national ice hockey team in the 1994 Winter Olympics. He also briefly played 15 games in the NHL with the Toronto Maple Leafs in the 1980s.

== Career statistics ==
=== Regular season and playoffs ===
			Regular season					Playoffs
Season	Team	League	GP	G	A	Pts	PIM	GP	G	A	Pts	PIM
1979–80	Streetsville Derbys	COJHL	36	21	24	45	125	—	—	—	—	—
1980–81	Peterborough Petes	OHL	64	17	36	53	52	5	2	1	3	18
1981–82	Peterborough Petes	OHL	42	21	22	43	69	9	8	11	19	23
1982–83	Peterborough Petes	OHL	57	41	48	89	80	4	2	2	4	4
1982–83	Toronto Maple Leafs	NHL	2	0	0	0	0	—	—	—	—	—
1983–84	Toronto Maple Leafs	NHL	2	0	2	2	2	—	—	—	—	—
1983–84	St. Catharines Saints	AHL	78	27	45	72	78	7	3	3	6	4
1984–85	Toronto Maple Leafs	NHL	11	2	0	2	4	—	—	—	—	—
1984–85	St. Catharines Saints	AHL	45	15	19	34	41	—	—	—	—	—
1985–86	St. Catharines Saints	AHL	33	16	25	41	14	3	0	1	1	0
1986–87	EHC Chur	NLA	15	9	4	13	40	—	—	—	—	—
1986–87	Adirondack Red Wings	AHL	31	7	13	20	18	11	6	7	13	12
1987–88	HC Martigny	NLB	3	2	1	3	8	—	—	—	—	—
1987–88	Villacher SV	AUT	22	29	25	54	63	—	—	—	—	—
1988–89	Villacher SV	AUT	46	42	57	99	—	—	—	—	—	—
1989–90	Villacher SV	AUT	37	32	45	77	52	—	—	—	—	—
1990–91	Villacher SV	AUT	43	40	42	82	110	—	—	—	—	—
1991–92	Villacher SV	AUT	44	48	41	89	77	—	—	—	—	—
1992–93	Villacher SV	AUT	46	34	34	68	63	—	—	—	—	—
1993–94	Villacher SV	AUT	48	33	42	75	57	—	—	—	—	—
1994–95	HC Gherdëina	ITA	36	17	29	46	34	—	—	—	—	—
1995–96	Villacher SV	AUT	43	35	30	65	99	—	—	—	—	—
1996–97	Kapfenberger SV	AUT	43	25	27	52	70	—	—	—	—	—
AUT totals			372	318	343	661	591	—	—	—	—	—
NHL totals			15	2	2	4	6	—	—	—	—	—

=== International ===
Year	Team	Event	GP	G	A	Pts	PIM
1992	Austria	WC-B	2	4	4	8	0
1994	Austria	OLY	7	3	1	4	12
1994	Austria	WC	6	2	0	2	8
1995	Austria	WC	7	0	1	1	4
Senior totals			22	9	6	15	24
