= 1973–74 Austrian Hockey League season =

Austrian ice hockey season

The 1973–74 Austrian Hockey League season was the 44th season of the Austrian Hockey League, the top level of ice hockey in Austria. Eight teams participated in the league, and EC KAC won the championship.

== Regular season ==
	Team	GP	W	L	T	GF	GA	Pts
1.	EC KAC	28	21	7	0	161	96	42
2.	EV Innsbruck	28	19	6	3	156	84	41
3.	ATSE Graz	28	18	8	2	120	75	38
4.	Wiener EV	28	13	12	3	109	130	29
5.	VEU Feldkirch	28	12	16	0	124	150	24
6.	HC Salzburg	28	9	15	4	129	151	22
7.	Kapfenberger SV	28	8	19	1	94	128	17
8.	WAT Stadlau	28	4	21	3	68	147	11

== Playoffs ==
=== Semifinals ===
- EC KAC - Wiener EV 3:2 (2:3 OT, 5:1, 4:1, 3:4, 10:2)
- ECS Innsbruck - ATSE Graz 3:2 (3:2, 2:3, 2:5, 5:4 OT, 5:2)

=== Final ===
- EC KAC - ECS Innsbruck 3:1 (5:2, 5:2, 3:6, 9:5)

=== 3rd place ===
- ATSE Graz - Wiener EV 2:3 (2:5, 8:3, 4:3, 4:6, 2:3)
