= 1967–68 Austrian Hockey League season =

Austrian ice hockey season

The 1967–68 Austrian Hockey League season was the 38th season of the Austrian Hockey League, the top level of ice hockey in Austria. Six teams participated in the league, and EC KAC won the championship.

== Regular season ==
	Team	GP	W	L	T	GF	GA	Pts
1.	EC KAC	10	7	0	3	63	25	17
2.	Innsbrucker EV	10	5	2	3	40	22	13
3.	EC Kitzbühel	10	4	3	3	38	31	11
4.	ATSE Graz	10	2	5	3	20	38	7
5.	Wiener EV	10	1	5	4	30	50	6
6.	VEU Feldkirch	10	2	6	2	36	61	6
