= 1969–70 Austrian Hockey League season =

Austrian ice hockey season

The 1969–70 Austrian Hockey League season was the 40th season of the Austrian Hockey League, the top level of ice hockey in Austria. Eight teams participated in the league, and EC KAC won the championship.

== Regular season ==
	Team	GP	W	T	L	GF:GA	P
1.	EC KAC	14	13	0	1	120: 33	25
2.	VEU Feldkirch	14	10	0	4	79: 48	20
3.	ATSE Graz	14	9	1	4	63: 40	19
4.	Innsbrucker EV	14	8	1	5	66: 45	17
5.	EC Kitzbühel	14	6	2	6	56: 48	14
6.	EK Zell am See	14	3	0	11	42: 93	6
7.	Wiener EV	14	3	0	11	50: 69	6
8.	EC Pradl	14	2	0	12	43:143	4

== Playoffs ==
=== Group A ===
	Team	GP	W	T	L	GF–GA	P
1.	EC KAC	20	17	1	2	157: 49	35
2.	EHC Feldkirch	20	12	1	7	97: 84	25
3.	ATSE Graz	20	11	2	7	80: 59	24
4.	EV Innsbruck	20	10	2	8	89: 69	22

=== Group B ===
	Team	GP	W	T	L	GF–GA	P
5.	EC Kitzbühel	20	11	2	7	94: 64	24
6.	Wiener EV	20	7	1	12	82: 87	15
7.	EK Zell am See	20	5	1	14	70:121	11
8.	EC Pradl	20	2	0	18	60:196	4

EC Pradl was relegated.
