= Patrick Pilloni =

Austrian ice hockey player

Patrik Pilloni
Personal information
- Nationality: Austrian
- Born: 21 February 1970 (age 56) Klagenfurt, Austria

Sport
- Sport: Ice hockey

Patrik Pilloni (born 21 February 1970) is an Austrian ice hockey player. He competed in the men's tournament at the 1998 Winter Olympics.

== Career statistics ==
=== Regular season and playoffs ===
			Regular season					Playoffs
Season	Team	League	GP	G	A	Pts	PIM	GP	G	A	Pts	PIM
1988–89	EC KAC	AUT	20	0	0	0	0	—	—	—	—	—
1989–90	EC KAC	AUT	25	4	6	10	10	—	—	—	—	—
1990–91	EC KAC	AUT	37	10	10	20	10	—	—	—	—	—
1991–92	EC KAC	AUT	43	6	13	19		—	—	—	—	—
1992–93	EC KAC	AUT	28	3	10	13		—	—	—	—	—
1993–94	EC KAC	AUT	51	6	12	18	71	—	—	—	—	—
1995–96	EC KAC	AUT	28	6	13	19	12	—	—	—	—	—
1996–97	EC KAC	AUT	53	15	19	34	28	—	—	—	—	—
1997–98	EC KAC	AUT	47	5	17	22	51	—	—	—	—	—
1998–99	EC KAC	AUT	22	5	6	11	10	—	—	—	—	—
1999–2000	EC KAC	IEHL	21	5	19	24	36	—	—	—	—	—
1999–2000	EC KAC	AUT	16	1	7	8	18	—	—	—	—	—
2000–01	EC KAC	AUT	40	6	18	24	42	—	—	—	—	—
2001–02	Vienna Capitals	AUT	32	14	22	36	89	6	0	2	2	6
2002–03	Vienna Capitals	AUT	9	1	1	2	8	—	—	—	—	—
2003–04	Vienna Capitals	AUT	34	5	12	17	52	—	—	—	—	—
2007–08	DEK Klagenfurt	AUT.3	1	0	0	0	4	1	0	1	1	4
AUT totals			485	87	166	253	401	6	0	2	2	6

=== International ===
Year	Team	Event	GP	G	A	Pts	PIM
1988	Austria	EJC B	5	0	0	0
1989	Austria	WJC C	4	2	3	5	4
1990	Austria	WJC B	7	3	5	8	12
1991	Austria	WC	7	0	0	0	4
1994	Austria	WC	6	0	1	1	6
1995	Austria	WC	7	0	0	0	2
1997	Austria	OGQ	4	0	0	0	0
1997	Austria	WC B	7	1	0	1	8
1998	Austria	OG	4	0	0	0	2
1998	Austria	WC	3	0	0	0	2
2001	Austria	OGQ	3	1	0	1	0
2001	Austria	WC	6	0	1	1	2
Junior totals			16	5	8	13	16
Senior totals			47	2	2	4	26

"Patrick Pilloni". Elite Prospects.
