= 1970–71 Austrian Hockey League season =

Austrian ice hockey season

The 1970–71 Austrian Hockey League season was the 41st season of the Austrian Hockey League, the top level of ice hockey in Austria. Eight teams participated in the league, and EC KAC won the championship.

== Regular season ==
	Team	GP	W	L	T	GF	GA	Pts
1.	EC KAC	28	25	1	2	190	75	52
2.	ATSE Graz	28	18	8	2	123	70	38
3.	VEU Feldkirch	28	17	9	2	150	86	36
4.	Innsbrucker EV	28	14	12	2	125	115	30
5.	EC Kitzbühel	28	12	15	1	129	137	25
6.	Wiener EV	28	10	15	3	119	123	23
7.	EK Zell am See	28	6	21	1	89	208	13
8.	Grazer AK	28	3	24	1	92	203	7
