= 1975–76 Austrian Hockey League season =

Austrian ice hockey season

The 1975–76 Austrian Hockey League season was the 46th season of the Austrian Hockey League, the top level of ice hockey in Austria. Eight teams participated in the league, and EC KAC won the championship.

== Regular season ==
	Team	GP	W	L	T	GF	GA	Pts
1.	EC KAC	28	20	5	3	149	86	43
2.	ECS Innsbruck	28	17	7	4	132	83	38
3.	ATSE Graz	28	13	9	6	121	88	32
4.	HC Salzburg	28	13	12	3	121	121	29
5.	VEU Feldkirch	28	13	13	2	123	134	28
6.	Kapfenberger SV	28	12	15	1	116	127	25
7.	WAT Stadlau	28	7	20	1	92	172	15
8.	Wiener EV	28	5	19	4	77	120	14

== Relegation ==
- Wiener EV - EC VSV (6:2, ?)
