= 1968–69 Austrian Hockey League season =

Austrian ice hockey season

The 1968–69 Austrian Hockey League season was the 39th season of the Austrian Hockey League, the top level of ice hockey in Austria. Seven teams participated in the league, and EC KAC won the championship.

== First round ==
	Team	GP	W	L	T	GF	GA	Pts
1.	EC KAC	12	11	1	0	99	26	22
2.	Innsbrucker EV	12	9	2	1	58	29	19
3.	ATSE Graz	12	5	4	3	26	29	13
4.	Wiener EV	12	4	6	2	31	45	10
5.	VEU Feldkirch	12	4	7	1	41	68	9
6.	EC Kitzbühel	12	4	8	0	39	66	8
7.	EK Zell am See	12	1	10	1	21	52	3

== Final round ==
	Team	GP	W	L	T	GF	GA	Pts
1.	EC KAC	18	15	2	1	128	38	31
2.	Innsbrucker EV	18	13	4	1	85	41	27
3.	ATSE Graz	18	8	6	4	40	46	20
4.	Wiener EV	18	4	12	2	44	87	10

Results carried over from the first round.

== Qualification round ==
	Team	GP	W	L	T	GF	GA	Pts
5.	EC Kitzbühel	16	8	8	0	70	78	16
6.	VEU Feldkirch	16	4	11	1	48	94	9
7.	EK Zell am See	16	3	12	1	36	67	7

Results carried over from the first round.

== Relegation ==
- EK Zell am See - HC Salzburg (10:1, 3:4)
