= 1961–62 Austrian Hockey League season =

Austrian ice hockey season

The 1961–62 Austrian Hockey League season was the 32nd season of the Austrian Hockey League, the top level of ice hockey in Austria. Seven teams participated in the league, and Wiener EV won the championship.

== Regular season ==
| | Team | GP | W | L | T | GF | GA | Pts |
|---|---|---|---|---|---|---|---|---|
| 1. | Wiener EV | 12 | 12 | 0 | 0 | 99 | 17 | 24 |
| 2. | Innsbrucker EV | 10 | 7 | 3 | 0 | 83 | 21 | 14* |
| 3. | EC KAC | 11 | 7 | 4 | 0 | 69 | 28 | 14* |
| 4. | EC Kitzbühel | 11 | 6 | 5 | 0 | 53 | 40 | 12* |
| 5. | EK Zell am See | 10 | 3 | 7 | 0 | 30 | 108 | 6 |
| 6. | EC VSV | 10 | 2 | 8 | 0 | 34 | 75 | 2* |
| 7. | SV Leoben | 8 | 0 | 8 | 0 | 10 | 89 | 0** |

(* One game not held, ** Four games not held.)
