= Larry Sacharuk =

Canadian ice hockey player

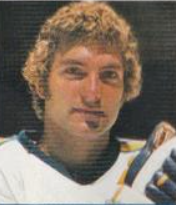
- Sacharuk in 1974-75 stamp
- Born: September 16, 1952 (age 73) Saskatoon, Saskatchewan, Canada
- Height: 6 ft 0 in (183 cm)
- Weight: 190 lb (86 kg; 13 st 8 lb)
- Position: Defenceman
- Shot: Right
- Played for: New York Rangers; St. Louis Blues; Indianapolis Racers; ECS Innsbruck; WAT Stadlau
- NHL draft: 21st overall, 1972; New York Rangers
- Playing career: 1972–1982

Lawrence William Sacharuk (born September 16, 1952) is a Canadian former professional ice hockey defenceman who played 151 games in the National Hockey League (NHL) for the New York Rangers and St. Louis Blues from 1972 to 1977. He also played 15 games in the World Hockey Association (WHA) with the Indianapolis Racers during the 1978–79 season. Sacharuk was drafted by the New York Rangers in second round, 21st overall in the 1972 NHL Amateur Draft.

== Junior hockey ==
Sacharuk began his career in 1967 as a 14-year-old with his hometown team, the Saskatoon Blades of the Western Canadian Hockey League (WCHL). It was rare for someone as young as Sacharuk to be playing at that level, and he was playing with older, more experienced players aged 17 to 20, many who were positioned to be drafted to the NHL. Sacharuk was already pushing 6 feet tall and 180 pounds as a defensive stalwart. At the Blades' training camp at that time, coach George "Bus" Agar noted Sacharuk's blistering slap-shot, an asset for a defenceman. He made the Blades roster for the 1967-68 campaign and scored six goals in only 34 games.

The following season, Sacharuk played 56 games with the Blades, recording 16 points with five goals. In the 1969-70 season the lowly Niagara Falls Flyers of the Ontario Hockey Association offered him a spot, promising more ice time and a chance to improve his game. In 51 games with the Flyers, Sacharuk improved by scoring 19 goals and 18 assists, a personal best up to that time. The following season, Sacharuk returned home to the Blades, and he was one of the team's scoring leaders for the following two seasons, with 77 goals in 124 games, and 171 points. In the 1971-72 season he scored 50 goals, finishing his junior career as the Blades' leading scorer, and also the tenth-leading goal scorer in the WCHL, tied with Lanny McDonald. The 50 goals set a single-season record WHL record which still stands as of 2020.

== Playing career ==
Sakaruk was drafted in the second round of the 1972 NHL Amateur Draft at #21 overall by the New York Rangers. At the time, the Rangers had established NHL defencemen such as Brad Park, Rod Seiling, Jim Neilson and Dale Rolfe, making it difficult to crack the Rangers roster. Ultimately, he was sent to the Rangers' American Hockey League (AHL) affiliate, the Providence Reds, at the start of the 1972–73 NHL season. After 64 games with the Reds he was recalled to the Rangers, and recorded one point, a goal, in eight games. The following season, he was again sent to the Reds following an unsuccessful Rangers' training camp. After 42 games for the Reds, Rangers again recalled him, and he played the remaining 23 games of the 1973–74 NHL season, but in limited playing time his offensive production suffered and he only managed six points in 23 games, scoring twice. Finding him expendable and in need of scoring, on August 29, 1974 the Rangers traded Sacharuk along with a number #1 draft pick to the St. Louis Blues for winger Greg Polis.

With the Blues during the 1974–75 NHL season, Sacharuk proved himself as an offensive-minded defenceman and scored 20 goals and 22 assists over the course of 76 games. He ended the season as the fifth-highest goal scored on the team, and the 20 goals set a Blues single-season record for defencemen, which he held until tied by Jeff Brown in 1992; Brown surpassed the record the following season. Sacharuk scored 14 of his goals on the road, which remains a single-season team record for defencemen. However the Blues also had several top NHL defensemen including the Bob and Barclay Plager, Bob Hess and Bob Gassoff, and traded Sacharuk back to the Rangers in the summer of 1975, in return for winger Bob MacMillan. Back in New York for the 1975–76 NHL season, Sacharuk's point production declined and he managed only 13 points in 42 games, missing almost half the season due to injury. The following season, he started with the Rangers' new AHL affiliate, the New Haven Nighthawks and put up some respectable numbers in the minors with 54 points including 23 goals in 55 regular season games. The Rangers called him up for only two games in the 1976–77 NHL season and he registered no points.

Sacharuk did not make the Rangers' squad in 1977-78 and was spent the entire season with New Haven. He returned to his offensive game and registered a solid 56 points, including 19 goals. During the summer of 1978, his contract was not renewed by the Rangers, and he took an offer from the Indianapolis Racers of the World Hockey Association (WHA). Sacharuk played 15 games with the Racers, who folded in December, recording 11 points. While other teammates on the Racers managed to find new homes to finish the season, Sacharuk was unable to do so and sat out the rest of the year. The following year, Sacharuk signed with the Birmingham Bulls in the Central Hockey League, where he played 80 games, notching 40 points.

In the 1980 season, he signed on to play with EC Innsbruck of the Austrian Hockey League where he played 34 games and managed 35 goals as a player who was over-skilled in a league which did not have many players with NHL experience. The following season in 1981-82 he played with Stadlau, another Austrian club, after which he retired from hockey. In 1988 the Birmingham Eagles of the British Hockey League enticed him to play for them, but he again retired after two games.

Sacharuk was noted for one of the hardest shots in hockey.

== Post-playing career ==
Following his playing career, Sacharuk has filled a variety of roles in hockey. He has coached HC TWK Innsbruck and Graz 99ers in Austria, HK Vojvodina and Serbia men's national ice hockey team in Serbia. In 2008 he became the head coach of the Serie A team Sport Ghiaccio Pontebba in Italy. In 2013 he became the marketing manager for the Merritt Centennials of the British Columbia Hockey League (BCHL). In 2017 Sacharuk joined the Southern Oregon Spartans of the United States Premier Hockey League as an assistant coach.

== Career statistics ==
=== Regular season and playoffs ===
			Regular season					Playoffs
Season	Team	League	GP	G	A	Pts	PIM	GP	G	A	Pts	PIM
1967–68	Saskatoon Blades	WCHL	34	6	2	8	4	7	1	1	2	0
1968–69	Saskatoon Blades	WCHL	56	5	11	16	39	4	1	1	2	0
1969–70	Niagara Falls Flyers	OHA	51	19	18	37	47	—	—	—	—	—
1970–71	Saskatoon Blades	WCHL	59	27	58	85	42	5	2	3	5	15
1971–72	Saskatoon Blades	WCHL	65	50	36	86	57	8	6	7	13	12
1972–73	New York Rangers	NHL	8	1	0	1	0	—	—	—	—	—
1972–73	Providence Reds	AHL	64	14	35	49	42	4	0	1	1	0
1973–74	New York Rangers	NHL	23	2	4	6	4	—	—	—	—	—
1973–74	Providence Reds	AHL	42	27	35	62	26	15	1	14	15	4
1974–75	St. Louis Blues	NHL	76	20	22	42	24	2	1	1	2	2
1975–76	New York Rangers	NHL	42	6	7	13	14	—	—	—	—	—
1976–77	New York Rangers	NHL	2	0	0	0	0	—	—	—	—	—
1976–77	New Haven Nighthawks	AHL	55	23	31	54	18	—	—	—	—	—
1977–78	New Haven Nighthawks	AHL	72	19	37	56	12	11	0	5	5	0
1978–79	Indianapolis Racers	WHA	15	2	9	11	25	—	—	—	—	—
1979–80	Birmingham Bulls	CHL	80	11	29	40	28	4	0	0	0	0
1980–81	ECS Innsbruck	AUT	34	35	23	58	34	—	—	—	—	—
1981–82	WAT Stadlau	AUT	23	13	11	24	34	—	—	—	—	—
1982–83	Birmingham Eagles	BD1	6	14	8	22	16	—	—	—	—	—
1988–89	Birmingham Eagles	BD2	2	11	7	18	0	—	—	—	—	—
WHA totals			15	2	9	11	25	—	—	—	—	—
NHL totals			151	29	33	62	42	2	1	1	2	2

== Awards ==
- WCHL Second All-Star Team – 1972
