= Randy Boyd (ice hockey) =

Canadian ice hockey player (1962–2022)

- Born: January 23, 1962 Coniston, Ontario, Canada
- Died: January 19, 2022 (aged 59) Marietta, Georgia, U.S.
- Height: 5 ft 11 in (180 cm)
- Weight: 200 lb (91 kg; 14 st 4 lb)
- Position: Defence
- Shot: Left
- Played for: Pittsburgh Penguins; Chicago Black Hawks; New York Islanders; Vancouver Canucks
- NHL draft: 51st overall, 1980; Pittsburgh Penguins
- Playing career: 1981–1993

Randall Keith Joseph Boyd (January 23, 1962 – January 19, 2022) was a Canadian professional ice hockey defenceman who played 257 games in the National Hockey League (NHL).

== Early life ==
Boyd was born in Coniston, Ontario, on January 23, 1962. From 1979 to 1982, he played junior hockey with the Ottawa 67's.

== Career ==
During his career, Boyd played for the Pittsburgh Penguins, Chicago Black Hawks, New York Islanders, and Vancouver Canucks between 1981 and 1988. After leaving the NHL, Boyd played professional hockey in Vienna for two years. He played with the Milwaukee Admirals from 1991 to 1993 and ended his career with the Wichita Thunder.

== Personal life ==
Boyd was a resident of Marietta, Georgia, and died on January 19, 2022, four days shy of his 60th birthday.

== Career statistics ==
=== Regular season and playoffs ===
			Regular season					Playoffs
Season	Team	League	GP	G	A	Pts	PIM	GP	G	A	Pts	PIM
1978–79	North Bay Trappers	OPJAHL	42	10	35	45	121	—	—	—	—	—
1979–80	Ottawa 67's	OMJHL	65	3	21	24	148	11	0	2	2	13
1980–81	Ottawa 67's	OHL	64	11	43	54	225	7	2	3	5	35
1981–82	Ottawa 67's	OHL	26	9	29	38	51	—	—	—	—	—
1981–82	Pittsburgh Penguins	NHL	23	0	2	2	49	3	0	0	0	11
1982–83	Baltimore Skipjacks	AHL	21	5	10	15	43	—	—	—	—	—
1982–83	Pittsburgh Penguins	NHL	56	4	14	18	71	—	—	—	—	—
1983–84	Baltimore Skipjacks	AHL	20	6	13	19	21	—	—	—	—	—
1983–84	Springfield Indians	AHL	27	2	11	13	48	4	0	2	2	34
1983–84	Pittsburgh Penguins	NHL	5	0	1	1	6	—	—	—	—	—
1983–84	Chicago Black Hawks	NHL	23	0	4	4	16	—	—	—	—	—
1984–85	Chicago Black Hawks	NHL	3	0	0	0	6	3	0	1	1	7
1984–85	Milwaukee Admirals	IHL	68	18	55	73	162	—	—	—	—	—
1985–86	New York Islanders	NHL	55	2	12	14	79	3	0	0	0	2
1986–87	Springfield Indians	AHL	48	9	30	39	96	—	—	—	—	—
1986–87	New York Islanders	NHL	30	7	17	24	37	4	0	1	1	6
1987–88	Vancouver Canucks	NHL	60	7	16	23	64	—	—	—	—	—
1988–89	Vancouver Canucks	NHL	2	0	1	1	0	—	—	—	—	—
1988–89	Milwaukee Admirals	IHL	73	24	55	79	218	9	0	6	6	26
1989–90	Wiener EV	AUT	16	4	16	20	75	—	—	—	—	—
1990–91	Wiener EV	AUT	31	6	14	20	0	—	—	—	—	—
1991–92	Milwaukee Admirals	IHL	42	7	9	16	80	2	0	1	1	2
1992–93	Milwaukee Admirals	IHL	8	1	4	5	8	—	—	—	—	—
1992–93	Wichita Thunder	CHL	22	10	26	36	92	—	—	—	—	—
NHL totals			257	20	67	87	328	13	0	2	2	26
AHL totals			116	22	64	86	208	4	0	2	2	34
IHL totals			191	50	123	173	468	11	0	7	7	28
