= 1974–75 Austrian Hockey League season =

Austrian ice hockey season

The 1974–75 Austrian Hockey League season was the 45th season of the Austrian Hockey League, the top level of ice hockey in Austria. Eight teams participated in the league, and ATSE Graz won the championship.

== Regular season ==
	Team	GP	W	L	T	GF	GA	Pts
1.	ATSE Graz	28	22	4	2	126	48	46
2.	EC Innsbruck	28	15	10	3	119	107	'33
3.	EC KAC	28	15	10	3	109	121	33
4.	Wiener EV	28	10	10	8	123	98	28
5.	Kapfenberger SV	28	11	11	6	105	99	28
6.	VEU Feldkirch	28	6	15	7	111	141	19
7.	WAT Stadlau	28	6	15	7	111	152	19
8.	HC Salzburg	28	6	16	6	97	135	18

== Relegation ==
- HC Salzburg - EK Zell am See 2:0 (7:2, 9:2)
