= Kevin LaVallee =

Canadian ice hockey player

- Born: September 16, 1961 (age 64) Sudbury, Ontario, Canada
- Height: 5 ft 8 in (173 cm)
- Weight: 180 lb (82 kg; 12 st 12 lb)
- Position: Left wing
- Shot: Left
- Played for: Calgary Flames; Los Angeles Kings; St. Louis Blues; Pittsburgh Penguins; Innsbrucker EV; HC Ambri-Piotta; SC Bern; HC Milan; HC Ajoie; EC Ratingen; Düsseldorfer EG; EC Hannover; HC Davos
- NHL draft: 32nd overall, 1980; Calgary Flames
- Playing career: 1980–1996

Kevin A. LaVallee (born September 16, 1961) is a Canadian former professional ice hockey forward. He played eight seasons in the National Hockey League with four teams from 1980 to 1987. The rest of his career, which lasted from 1980 to 1996, was mainly spent in Europe.

== NHL ==
LaVallee started his NHL career with the Calgary Flames in 1980. He also played for the Los Angeles Kings, Pittsburgh Penguins, and St. Louis Blues. LaVallee played the last of his 398 NHL games (including playoffs) with the Penguins during the 1986–87 NHL season.

== Europe ==
Following his NHL career, LaVallee played another nine seasons in various European leagues. He was with Innsbruck EV in Austria from 1987–88 until midway through 1989–90. He played for SC Bern for the remainder of that season. In 1990–91 He moved to Italy playing for HC Milano in 1991–92 he played for a different team in Milan. In 1992–93 He joined the Ayr Raiders of the BHL. Later that season he moved to EC Ratingen in Germany. He moved again during the 1992–93 season, this time to Ajoie in the Swiss National League A (NLA). In 1993–94 he went back to Germany with Düsseldorfer EG. He moved with the team in 1994–95 to the newly created Deutsche Eishockey Liga (DEL). In 1995–96 He started the season playing for the DEL's EC Hannover before returning to Switzerland and playing for HC Davos in the NLA.

LaVallee retired from professional hockey following the 1995–96 season.

== Career statistics ==
=== Regular season and playoffs ===
			Regular season					Playoffs
Season	Team	League	GP	G	A	Pts	PIM	GP	G	A	Pts	PIM
1977–78	Sudbury Wolves U18	GNML	30	45	48	93	10	—	—	—	—	—
1978–79	Brantford Alexanders	OMJHL	66	27	23	50	30	—	—	—	—	—
1979–80	Brantford Alexanders	OMJHL	65	65	70	135	50	—	—	—	—	—
1980–81	Calgary Flames	NHL	77	15	20	35	16	8	2	3	5	4
1981–82	Calgary Flames	NHL	75	32	29	61	30	3	0	0	0	7
1982–83	Calgary Flames	NHL	60	19	16	35	17	8	1	3	4	4
1982–83	Colorado Flames	CHL	5	5	4	9	0	—	—	—	—	—
1983–84	Los Angeles Kings	NHL	19	3	3	6	2	—	—	—	—	—
1983–84	New Haven Nighthawks	AHL	47	29	23	52	25	—	—	—	—	—
1984–85	St. Louis Blues	NHL	38	15	17	32	8	—	—	—	—	—
1985–86	St. Louis Blues	NHL	64	18	20	38	8	13	2	2	4	6
1986–87	Pittsburgh Penguins	NHL	33	8	20	28	4	—	—	—	—	—
1987–88	Innsbruck EV	AUT	34	39	33	72	0	—	—	—	—	—
1987–88	HC Ambri-Piotta	NLA	3	3	1	4	2	—	—	—	—	—
1988–89	Innsbruck EV	AUT	40	45	47	92	0	—	—	—	—	—
1989–90	Innsbruck EV	AUT	33	43	42	34	—	—	—	—	—
1989–90	SC Bern	NLA	—	—	—	—	—	7	5	5	10	0
1990–91	HC Milan	ITA	36	33	50	83	16	—	—	—	—	—
1991–92	HC Milan	ITA	16	15	17	32	4	12	5	7	12	7
1991–92	HC Milan	ALP	10	7	9	16	4	—	—	—	—	—
1992–93	Ratingen EC	GER	10	6	12	18	2	3	0	1	1	0
1992–93	Ajoie	NLA	9	3	7	10	27	—	—	—	—	—
1993–94	Düsseldorfer EG	GER	44	19	19	38	33	12	2	8	10	8
1994–95	Düsseldorfer EG	DEL	39	14	24	38	26	10	8	5	13	0
1995–96	Hannover EC	DEL	23	16	20	36	22	—	—	—	—	—
1995–96	HC Davos	NLA	18	8	10	18	6	3	1	1	2	2
NHL totals			366	110	125	235	85	32	5	8	13	21
