= 1964–65 Austrian Hockey League season =

Austrian ice hockey season

The 1964–65 Austrian Hockey League season was the 35th season of the Austrian Hockey League, the top level of ice hockey in Austria. Eight teams participated in the league, and Klagenfurter AC won the championship.

== First round ==
	Team	GP	W	L	T	GF	GA	Pts
1.	Innsbrucker EV	7	6	0	1	40	7	13
2.	Klagenfurter AC	7	6	1	0	66	11	12
3.	Wiener EV	7	5	1	1	41	15	11
4.	EC Kitzbühel	7	3	4	0	29	36	6
5.	EK Zell am See	7	3	4	0	16	31	4
6.	EV Salzburg	7	2	5	0	13	41	4
7.	SV Ehrwald	7	1	6	0	20	45	2
8.	ATSE Graz	7	1	6	0	10	49	2

== Final round ==
	Team	GP	W	L	T	GF	GA	Pts
1.	Klagenfurter AC	6	6	0	0	36	13	12
2.	Innsbrucker EV	6	3	2	1	23	21	7
3.	Wiener EV	6	2	4	0	25	24	4
4.	EC Kitzbühel	6	0	5	1	13	39	1

== Qualification round ==
	Team	GP	W	L	T	GF	GA	Pts
5.	EK Zell am See	5	2	1	2	18	10	6
6.	ATSE Graz	5	2	1	2	18	12	6
7.	SV Ehrwald	5	2	2	1	17	20	5
8.	EV Salzburg	5	1	3	1	16	27	3
