= Reg Thomas (ice hockey) =

Canadian ice hockey player

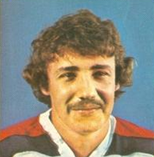
- Born: April 21, 1953 (age 72) London, Ontario, Canada
- Height: 5 ft 10 in (178 cm)
- Weight: 180 lb (82 kg; 12 st 12 lb)
- Position: Centre
- Shot: Left
- Played for: Los Angeles Sharks; Michigan Stags/Baltimore Blades; Indianapolis Racers; Cincinnati Stingers; Quebec Nordiques; WAT Stadlau
- NHL draft: 29th overall, 1973; Chicago Black Hawks
- WHA draft: 8th overall, 1973; Los Angeles Sharks
- Playing career: 1973–1985

Reginald Kenneth Thomas (born April 21, 1953) is a Canadian former professional ice hockey player who played in the World Hockey Association (WHA) from 1973 to 1979, and in the National Hockey League from 1979 to 1980.

== Career ==
Thomas led the Western Jr.B league in scoring as a 16-year old with 43 goals and 72 points. He was drafted 4th overall in the OHA midget draft by Kitchener, but held out and forced a trade on October 11, 1970, to his hometown London Knights (London sent 1971 1st- and 5th-round picks and Chuck Blair to Kitchener). After a standout junior career with the London Knights, in which he scored 309 points in only three seasons, he was drafted by both the Los Angeles Sharks of the WHA and the Chicago Black Hawks of the National Hockey League (NHL). Thomas played seven seasons in the WHA for the Sharks, Michigan Stags, Baltimore Blades, Indianapolis Racers, and Cincinnati Stingers. After the WHA-NHL merger he played 39 NHL games for the Quebec Nordiques in the NHL, and ultimately retired from hockey in 1985 after a spell in Austria for WAT Stadlau. After his career Thomas ran a farm and produce market just outside Lambeth, Ontario.

== Personal life ==
His son, Reg Thomas Jr., played hockey as well, for the Sarnia Sting and Sault Ste. Marie Greyhounds. Thomas has another son named Dylan, who was drafted by the Belleville Bulls of the OHL and his youngest son, Blake Thomas also played for the Sarnia Sting.

== Career statistics ==
=== Regular season and playoffs ===
			Regular season					Playoffs
Season	Team	League	GP	G	A	Pts	PIM	GP	G	A	Pts	PIM
1969–70	London Squires	Western Jr.B	32	43	29	72	—	—	—	—	—	—
1970–71	London Knights	OHA	58	35	35	70	29	—	—	—	—	—
1971–72	London Knights	OHA	61	49	55	104	38	4	2	1	3	2
1972–73	London Knights	OHA	61	52	83	135	41	—	—	—	—	—
1973–74	Los Angeles Sharks	WHA	72	14	21	35	22	—	—	—	—	—
1974–75	Michigan Stags/Baltimore Blades	WHA	50	8	13	21	42	—	—	—	—	—
1975–76	Indianapolis Racers	WHA	80	23	17	40	23	7	1	0	1	4
1976–77	Indianapolis Racers	WHA	79	25	30	55	34	9	7	9	16	4
1977–78	Indianapolis Racers	WHA	49	15	16	31	44	—	—	—	—	—
1977–78	Cincinnati Stingers	WHA	18	4	2	6	12	—	—	—	—	—
1978–79	Cincinnati Stingers	WHA	80	32	39	71	22	3	1	1	2	0
1979–80	Quebec Nordiques	NHL	39	9	7	16	6	—	—	—	—	—
1979–80	New Brunswick Hawks	AHL	31	20	20	40	18	—	—	—	—	—
1980–81	Nova Scotia Voyageurs	AHL	74	36	43	79	90	4	1	6	7	2
1981–82	Cincinnati Tigers	CHL	80	47	63	110	55	4	2	2	4	2
1982–83	St. Catharines Saints	AHL	80	35	57	92	22	—	—	—	—	—
1983–84	Montana Magic	CHL	3	0	0	0	0	—	—	—	—	—
1983–84	WAT Stadlau	AUT	38	40	40	80	40	—	—	—	—	—
1984–85	WAT Stadlau	AUT	34	24	32	56	20	—	—	—	—	—
WHA totals			428	121	138	259	199	19	9	10	19	8
NHL totals			39	9	7	16	6	—	—	—	—	—
