= 1965–66 Austrian Hockey League season =

Austrian ice hockey season

The 1965–66 Austrian Hockey League season was the 36th season of the Austrian Hockey League, the top level of ice hockey in Austria. Four teams participated in the league, and EC KAC won the championship.

== Regular season ==
	Team	GP	W	L	T	GF	GA	Pts
1.	EC KAC	12	10	1	1	87	30	21
2.	Innsbrucker EV	12	6	5	1	47	39	13
3.	Wiener EV	12	5	7	0	31	68	10
4.	EC Kitzbühel	12	2	10	0	28	56	4
