= Larry Regan =

- Born: August 9, 1930 North Bay, Ontario, Canada
- Died: March 9, 2009 (aged 78) Ottawa, Ontario, Canada
- Height: 5 ft 9 in (175 cm)
- Weight: 162 lb (73 kg; 11 st 8 lb)
- Position: Right wing
- Shot: Right
- Played for: Boston Bruins; Toronto Maple Leafs
- Playing career: 1957–1961

Lawrence Emmett Regan (August 9, 1930 – March 9, 2009), was a Canadian professional ice hockey player and hockey executive. He played for the Boston Bruins and Toronto Maple Leafs after a long senior-hockey career, winning the Allan Cup in 1948. He later managed and coached the Los Angeles Kings of the NHL and was president of the NHL Alumni Association.

== Playing career ==
Regan moved to Ottawa as a youth. As a 16-year-old, he joined the Ottawa Jr. Senators organization in 1945–46. Regan then played for the Ottawa Senators in the Quebec Senior Hockey League. He moved to Toronto to play two seasons with the Toronto Marlboros organization, first as a junior, then at the senior level. He returned to the Senators in 1950, playing two seasons before joining the Shawinigan Cataracts. Regan then moved on to the Pembroke Lumber Kings of the Northern Ontario Hockey Association and the Quebec Aces of the Quebec Hockey League.

In 1956-57, Larry finally got his chance in the National Hockey League with the Boston Bruins as a 27-year-old. He scored 14 goals that season, which would be his career high, and he won the Calder Memorial Trophy, the oldest player to win it at that time (Sergei Makarov won it when he was 31 years old in 1988-89 with the Calgary Flames). He played two and a half seasons with the Bruins before being claimed on waivers, for $15,000 on January 7, 1959, by the Toronto Maple Leafs. He played two further seasons with the Leafs before being demoted to the Pittsburgh Hornets in the American Hockey League. In 1962, he moved to Innsbruck, Austria, coaching the Innsbrucker EV for two seasons before returning to the AHL with the Baltimore Clippers in 1965-66 for one final season.

== Hockey executive career ==
While still playing, Regan became a playing-coach in 1961–62 with the Pittsburgh Hornets for part of the season. He was named to coach the Etobicoke Indians of the Ontario Hockey Association in 1966, but left the position to join Jack Kent Cooke, owner of the expansion Los Angeles Kings, as head scout, and later Regan was promoted to general manager. Regan was also the head coach for the 1970-71 and part of the 1971-72 seasons and he remained in the job until 1973.

"I knew Jack from the years I played in Toronto. We became pretty good friends along the way and stayed in touch. When I heard about the NHL expanding, I put my oar in the water with Jack before anybody else and I was fortunate enough to be chosen."

As coach, Regan was once fined US$1,000 by NHL president Clarence Campbell for punching referee Bruce Hood in the face following a game in Oakland, California, California in 1968. He was upset after a late penalty cost the Kings a victory against the California Seals. Regan was quoted as saying "Someone had to do something with officiating like that." More than 10,000 attended the next Kings' game.

After his time with the Los Angeles Kings, he moved to Montreal where he coached the Montreal Juniors in the 1974–75 season, quitting after the one season.

== NHL Alumni Association and Alan Eagleson inquiry ==
After leaving the Montreal Juniors, Regan became involved in the National Hockey League Alumni Association (NHLAA), an association of retired NHL ice hockey players, eventually becoming the head of the organization. In the 1980s, former NHL stars such as Gordie Howe and Bobby Orr noticed that they were not being paid to the full amount that they should have been paid for their pensions. An investigation by a Boston-area reporter named Russ Conway led to Alan Eagleson being indicted and convicted on fraud and was sentenced to prison. Regan was head of the NHLAA at the time and he participated in the investigation, contacting any player involved with Eagleson.

== Post NHL life ==
Regan retired soon after the Eagleson inquiry and he lived in Ottawa, Ontario with his wife Pauline until his death in 2009. He had Parkinson's disease prior to his death.

== Awards and achievements ==
- Calder Memorial Trophy winner in 1957.

== Career statistics ==
			Regular season					Playoffs
Season	Team	League	GP	G	A	Pts	PIM	GP	G	A	Pts	PIM
1946–47	Ottawa Jr. Senators	OCJHL	24	22	18	40	2	2	0	2	2	0
1946–47	Ottawa Senators	QSHL	3	1	0	1	0	3	0	0	0	0
1947–48	Ottawa Senators	QSHL	41	17	14	31	35	5	0	2	2	0
1948–49	Toronto Marlboros	OHA-Jr.	40	19	15	34	25	10	4	2	6	0
1949–50	Toronto Marlboros	OHA-Jr.	48	38	36	74	22	5	1	3	4	0
1950–51	Ottawa Senators	QMHL	52	14	31	45	28	9	0	3	3	0
1951–52	Ottawa Senators	QMHL	50	11	10	21	27	7	0	0	0	8
1952–53	Shawinigan Cataractes	QMHL	52	15	27	42	21	—	—	—	—	—
1953–54	Quebec Aces	QHL	70	19	32	51	14	16	5	5	10	4
1953–54	Quebec Aces	Ed-Cup	—	—	—	—	—	7	2	1	3	0
1954–55	Quebec Aces	QHL	51	11	30	41	39	8	1	2	3	6
1955–56	Quebec Aces	QHL	3	3	1	4	2	7	4	4	8	4
1955–56	Pembroke Lumber Kings	NOHA	22	5	14	19	10	—	—	—	—	—
1956–57	Boston Bruins	NHL	69	14	19	33	29	8	0	2	2	10
1957–58	Boston Bruins	NHL	59	11	28	39	22	12	3	8	11	6
1958–59	Boston Bruins	NHL	36	5	6	11	10	—	—	—	—	—
1958–59	Toronto Maple Leafs	NHL	32	4	21	25	2	8	1	1	2	2
1959–60	Toronto Maple Leafs	NHL	47	4	16	20	6	10	3	3	6	0
1960–61	Toronto Maple Leafs	NHL	37	3	5	8	2	4	0	0	0	0
1961–62	Pittsburgh Hornets	AHL	49	10	19	29	12	—	—	—	—	—
1962–63	Innsbrucker EV	AUS	—	—	—	—	—	—	—	—	—	—
1963–64	Innsbrucker EV	AUS	—	—	—	—	—	—	—	—	—	—
1965–66	Baltimore Clippers	AHL	64	16	34	50	41	—	—	—	—	—
QSHL/QMHL/QHL totals			322	91	145	236	166	55	10	16	26	22
NHL totals			280	41	95	136	71	42	7	14	21	18

== Coaching record ==
Team	Year	Regular season						Postseason
Team	Year	G	W	L	T	Pts	Finish	Result
LAK	1970-71	78	25	30	13	63	5th in West	Missed playoffs
LAK	1971-72	10	2	7	1	(5)	7th in West	(fired)
Total		88	27	37	14			

Preceded by Glenn Hall	Winner of the Calder Memorial Trophy; 1957	Succeeded by Frank Mahovlich
Preceded by Position created	General Manager of the Los Angeles Kings; 1967–73	Succeeded by Jake Milford
Preceded by Johnny Wilson	Head coach of the Los Angeles Kings; 1970–71	Succeeded by Fred Glover
