= John Brenneman =

Canadian ice hockey player

- Born: January 5, 1943 (age 82); Fort Erie, Ontario, Canada
- Height: 5 ft 10 in (178 cm)
- Weight: 175 lb (79 kg; 12 st 7 lb)
- Position: Left wing
- Shot: Left
- Played for: Chicago Black Hawks; New York Rangers; Toronto Maple Leafs; Detroit Red Wings; Oakland Seals
- Playing career: 1959–1974

John Gary Brenneman (born January 5, 1943) is a Canadian former professional ice hockey player. He played in the National Hockey League between 1964 and 1969 with the Chicago Black Hawks, New York Rangers, Toronto Maple Leafs, Detroit Red Wings, and Oakland Seals. In 159 games he scored 21 goals and 19 assists as a left winger.

== Career ==
Brenneman played OHA junior hockey in the Chicago Black Hawks organization, playing for the St. Catharines Teepees from 1959 through 1962 and the St. Catharines Black Hawks in 1962–3. While still in his final year of junior he played 4 games for the AHL's Buffalo Bisons, scoring a goal. The next season saw Brenneman post impressive offensive totals with the St. Louis Braves of the CPHL. In 1964–65 he split the season amongst the Braves and two NHL teams, the Chicago Black Hawks, for whom he appeared in 17 games and scored a goal, and the New York Rangers, collecting 3 goals and 3 assists in 22 contests.

Brenneman remained in the Rangers organization for the following season, going scoreless in 11 games with the parent club while playing again in the CPHL for the Minnesota Rangers and the AHL with the Baltimore Clippers. For 1966–67, Brenneman played split time between the AHL's Rochester Americans and NHL's Toronto Maple Leafs. He played 41 regular season games for Toronto, qualifying to be on the cup. However, Brenneman's name was left off the cup, because he was sent to the minors before the playoffs.

Brenneman spent the following seasons split between the Detroit Red Wings organization, where he played 9 games and scored 2 assists for the parent club, and the Oakland Seals, for whom he appeared in 31 games and scored 10 goals and 8 assists in 31 games. He remained with Oakland for the following season, scoring a goal and collecting 2 assists in 21 games. Following a season when did not play pro hockey, Brenneman played 1970–71 in the IHL with the Dayton Gems, scoring 41 points in 50 games.

In 1974–5, Brenneman returned to pro hockey, joining Austrian club Innsbrucker EV, for whom he collected 18 goals and 31 points in 28 games.

== Career statistics ==
=== Regular season and playoffs ===
			Regular season					Playoffs
Season	Team	League	GP	G	A	Pts	PIM	GP	G	A	Pts	PIM
1959–60	St. Catharines Teepees	OHA	48	11	18	29	17	17	5	3	8	8
1960–61	St. Catharines Teepees	OHA	48	12	13	25	26	14	5	8	13	2
1961–62	St. Catharines Teepees	OHA	49	12	30	42	10	6	2	4	6	2
1962–63	St. Catharines Black Hawks	OHA	48	31	27	58	38	—	—	—	—	—
1962–63	Buffalo Bisons	AHL	4	1	0	1	0	—	—	—	—	—
1963–64	St. Louis Braves	CHL	70	28	47	75	28	6	2	1	3	11
1964–65	St. Louis Braves	CHL	27	7	17	24	20	—	—	—	—	—
1964–65	Chicago Black Hawks	NHL	17	1	0	1	2	—	—	—	—	—
1964–65	New York Rangers	NHL	22	3	3	6	6	—	—	—	—	—
1965–66	New York Rangers	NHL	11	0	0	0	14	—	—	—	—	—
1965–66	Baltimore Clippers	AHL	33	5	8	13	16	—	—	—	—	—
1965–66	Minnesota Rangers	CHL	20	10	7	17	16	7	0	2	2	0
1966–67	Toronto Maple Leafs	NHL	41	6	4	10	4	—	—	—	—	—
1966–67	Rochester Americans	AHL	13	3	10	13	4	13	0	3	3	0
1967–68	Detroit Red Wings	NHL	9	0	2	2	0	—	—	—	—	—
1967–68	Fort Worth Wings	CHL	14	5	2	7	10	—	—	—	—	—
1967–68	California/Oakland Seals	NHL	31	10	8	18	14	—	—	—	—	—
1967–68	San Diego Gulls	WHL	5	2	2	4	4	—	—	—	—	—
1968–69	Oakland Seals	NHL	21	1	2	3	6	7	0	0	0	0
1968–69	Cleveland Barons	AHL	49	14	13	27	41	5	1	0	1	0
1970–71	Dayton Gems	IHL	50	23	18	41	20	10	3	4	7	4
1973–74	Cambridge Hornets	OHA Sr	16	7	5	12	12	—	—	—	—	—
1974–75	Innsbrucker EV	AUT	28	18	13	31	16	—	—	—	—	—
AHL totals			99	23	31	54	61	18	1	3	4	0
CHL totals			131	50	73	123	74	13	2	3	5	11
NHL totals			152	21	19	40	46	7	0	0	0	0
