= 1960–61 Austrian Hockey League season =

Austrian ice hockey season

The 1960–61 Austrian Hockey League season was the 31st season of the Austrian Hockey League, the top level of ice hockey in Austria. Six teams participated in the league, and EV Innsbruck won the championship.

== Regular season ==
	Team	GP	W	L	T	GF	GA	Pts
1.	EV Innsbruck	10	10	0	0	77	15	20
2.	EC KAC	10	8	2	0	58	17	16
3.	SG Kitzbühel-Salzburg	10	4	6	0	37	43	8
4.	SV Leoben	10	3	6	1	26	73	7
5.	Wiener EV	10	3	7	0	33	46	6
6.	EC VSV	10	1	8	1	26	63	3
