= 1959–60 Austrian Hockey League season =

Austrian ice hockey season

The 1959–60 Austrian Hockey League season was the 30th season of the Austrian Hockey League, the top level of ice hockey in Austria. Six teams participated in the league, and EC KAC won the championship.

== Regular season ==
	Team	GP	W	L	T	GF	GA	Pts
1.	EC KAC	10	10	0	0	76	13	20
2.	EV Innsbruck	10	7	2	1	111	19	15
3.	EC Kitzbühel	10	6	3	1	90	41	13
4.	SV Leoben	10	4	6	0	34	58	8
5.	EC VSV	10	2	8	0	27	99	4
6.	Union Wien	10	0	10	0	25	133	0
