= 1966–67 Austrian Hockey League season =

Austrian ice hockey season

The 1966–67 Austrian Hockey League season was the 37th season of the Austrian Hockey League, the top level of ice hockey in Austria. Five teams participated in the league, and EC KAC won the championship.

== Regular season ==
	Team	GP	W	L	T	GF	GA	Pts
1.	EC KAC	16	15	0	1	106	26	31
2.	Innsbrucker EV	16	9	7	0	64	49	18
3.	EC Kitzbühel	16	6	8	2	63	77	14
4.	Wiener EV	16	4	10	2	53	67	10
5.	ATSE Graz	16	3	12	1	27	94	7
