= 1963–64 Austrian Hockey League season =

Austrian ice hockey season

The 1963–64 Austrian Hockey League season was the 34th season of the Austrian Hockey League, the top level of ice hockey in Austria. Seven teams participated in the league, and EC KAC won the championship.

== Final round ==
	Team	GP	W	L	T	GF	GA	Pts
1.	EC KAC	6	4	2	0	42	19	8
2.	EV Innsbruck	6	3	1	2	33	21	8
3.	Wiener EV	6	3	1	2	22	20	8
4.	EC Kitzbühel	6	0	6	0	14	51	0

== 5th-7th place ==
	Team	GP	W	L	T	GF	GA	Pts
5.	EK Zell am See	12	3	1	0	22	9	6
6.	ATSE Graz	12	2	2	0	12	13	4
7.	EC Ehrwald	12	1	3	0	8	20	2
