= Merve Kuryluk =

Canadian ice hockey player

- Born: August 10, 1937 (age 87); Yorkton, Saskatchewan, Canada
- Height: 5 ft 11 in (180 cm)
- Weight: 185 lb (84 kg; 13 st 3 lb)
- Position: Left wing
- Shot: Left
- Played for: Chicago Black Hawks; WAT Stadlau
- Playing career: 1957–1965; 1974–1975

Mervin Kuryluk (born August 10, 1937) is a Canadian former ice hockey player. He played two playoff games in the National Hockey League with the Chicago Black Hawks during the 1962 Stanley Cup playoffs. The rest of his career, which lasted from 1957 to 1965, was spent in the minor leagues.

== Career statistics ==
=== Regular season and playoffs ===
			Regular season					Playoffs
Season	Team	League	GP	G	A	Pts	PIM	GP	G	A	Pts	PIM
1954–55	Moose Jaw Canucks	WCJHL	39	10	21	31	78	—	—	—	—	—
1955–56	Yorkton Terriers	SJHL	38	26	34	60	113	—	—	—	—	—
1956–57	Melville Millionaires	SJHL	50	31	35	66	135	—	—	—	—	—
1956–57	Calgary Stampeders	WHL	4	1	0	1	0	3	0	1	1	2
1957–58	Calgary Stampeders	WHL	59	12	16	28	44	14	1	3	4	10
1958–59	Saskatoon Quakers	WHL	59	15	33	48	34	—	—	—	—	—
1959–60	Sault Thunderbirds	EPHL	45	15	26	41	40	—	—	—	—	—
1959–60	Calgary Stampeders	WHL	22	5	9	14	16	—	—	—	—	—
1960–61	Sault Thunderbirds	EPHL	69	22	20	42	84	12	4	7	11	13
1961–62	Sault Thunderbirds	EPHL	65	36	26	62	130	—	—	—	—	—
1961–62	Chicago Black Hawks	NHL	—	—	—	—	—	2	0	0	0	0
1961–62	Buffalo Bisons	AHL	—	—	—	—	—	2	0	0	0	0
1962–63	St. Louis Braves	EPHL	61	22	53	75	60	—	—	—	—	—
1963–64	Buffalo Bisons	AHL	72	14	25	39	45	—	—	—	—	—
1964–65	Buffalo Bisons	AHL	1	1	0	1	0	—	—	—	—	—
1964–65	St. Louis Braves	CPHL	58	9	31	40	66	—	—	—	—	—
1964–65	Los Angeles Blades	WHL	14	0	1	1	8	—	—	—	—	—
1974–75	WAT Stadlau	AUT	69	12	33	45	26	—	—	—	—	—
EPHL totals			240	95	125	220	314	12	4	7	11	13
WHL totals			158	33	59	92	102	17	1	4	5	12
NHL totals			—	—	—	—	—	2	0	0	0	0
