= Hec Lalande =

Canadian ice hockey player

- Born: November 24, 1934 North Bay, Ontario, Canada
- Died: August 18, 2010 (aged 75) North Bay, Ontario, Canada
- Height: 5 ft 9 in (175 cm)
- Weight: 157 lb (71 kg; 11 st 3 lb)
- Position: Centre
- Shot: Left
- Played for: Chicago Black Hawks; Detroit Red Wings
- Playing career: 1953–1968

Hector Joseph Lalande (November 24, 1934 – August 18, 2010) was a Canadian professional ice hockey centre. He played in 151 National Hockey League (NHL) games with the Chicago Black Hawks and Detroit Red Wings between 1954 and 1958. His most productive years were in the minors with the Clinton Comets where he had back-to-back 100-point seasons.

== Personal ==
Born in North Bay, Ontario, Lalande returned each summer during his hockey career. After his hockey career, Lalande returned to North Bay permanently. In North Bay, he coached local hockey and baseball teams. He organized and coached sledge hockey for disabled athletes. Lalande was inducted into the North Bay Sports Hall of Fame in 1986.

== Professional career ==
=== Minor league hockey ===
Lalande started out playing for the Belleville Bulls and Galt Black Hawks of the Ontario Hockey League Junior. He showed great promise as a playmaker and was quickly recognized by NHL scouts. In the middle of the 1953–54 season, Lalande was called up by Galt's parent team the Chicago Black Hawks to play two games. He did not record a point but received two penalty minutes. He was sent back down to finish the season in Galt. The following season Lalande was again brought up to a higher league, this time with the Buffalo Bisons of the American Hockey League. He played three games but again failed to really impress and was returned to Galt. He finished out the season leading his team in points with 31 goals and 48 assists, putting him fifth in the league overall for points and fourth in the league in assists. He had finally caught the attention of Chicago and was brought up to play a permanent role with the Black Hawks for the 1955–56 season.

=== Playing in the NHL ===
Lalande played 65 games for Chicago that season and recorded 26 points. He would continue that pace the following season while playing with linemates Forbes Kennedy and Harry Watson. He also saw time with affiliate the Rochester Americans in 1956. During the 1957–58 season, Lalande played 22 games for Chicago before being traded to the Detroit Red Wings along with Nick Mickoski, Bob Bailey and Jack McIntyre for Bill Dineen, Billy Dea, Lorne Ferguson and Earl Reibel on December 17, 1957. In 12 games with the Red Wings, Lalande put up only two assists and was traded, four months after coming from Chicago, to the Hershey Bears of the AHL along with Don Poile and cash for Dunc Fisher on April 23, 1958.

The trade would turn out to be a blessing in disguise as Lalande would help lead the Bears to back-to-back Calder Cup Championships in 1957–58 and 1958–59. Lalande remained with the Bears for three more seasons, helping them to again reach the finals in 1960–61, eventually falling four games to none to the Springfield Indians. Lalande also played a single game for the Montreal Royals of the Eastern Professional Hockey League in a rehab stint in 1961. After scoring 57 points in the 1961–62 AHL season and leading the Bears to a second round playoff appearance, Lalande decided to leave Hershey for the St. Louis Braves of the EPHL. Playing in only 26 games, Lalande scored 30 points and 57 PIMs.

For the 1963–64 season, Lalande joined the Clinton Comets of the Eastern Hockey League and put up his most impressive numbers to date. Lalande finished first on his team in points and second overall in the league in assists with 27 goals, 75 assists and 102 points on the season. Lalande was a driving force behind the Comets winning of the Atlantic City Boardwalk Trophy and the Walker Cup. The following season, Lalande again put up big numbers with 31 goals and 69 assists for another 100-point season. In August 1965, Lalande was traded by Clinton to the Jersey Devils along with Norm Defelice, Ted Sydlowski and Benny Woit for Ed Babiuk, Pat Kelly and Borden Smith. Lalande would finish out his best playing days with Jersey scoring 61 points in three seasons with the club. After two games into the 1967–68 season, Lalande joined the OHA Senior A Hockey League to play for the Belleville Mohawks and would retire from ice hockey after scoring 17 points in his last 28 games.

== Career statistics ==
=== Regular season and playoffs ===
			Regular season					Playoffs
Season	Team	League	GP	G	A	Pts	PIM	GP	G	A	Pts	PIM
1952–53	Galt Black Hawks	OHA	56	9	24	33	65	11	6	6	12	27
1953–54	Galt Black Hawks	OHA	59	17	22	39	118	—	—	—	—	—
1953–54	Chicago Black Hawks	NHL	2	0	0	0	0	—	—	—	—	—
1954–55	Galt Black Hawks	OHA	49	31	48	79	93	4	5	0	5	8
1954–55	Buffalo Bisons	AHL	3	0	1	1	2	—	—	—	—	—
1955–56	Chicago Black Hawks	NHL	65	8	18	26	70	—	—	—	—	—
1956–57	Chicago Black Hawks	NHL	50	11	17	28	38	—	—	—	—	—
1956–57	Rochester Americans	AHL	13	5	2	7	17	—	—	—	—	—
1957–58	Chicago Black Hawks	NHL	22	2	2	4	10	—	—	—	—	—
1957–58	Detroit Red Wings	NHL	12	0	2	2	2	—	—	—	—	—
1957–58	Hershey Bears	AHL	11	7	7	14	12	11	3	4	7	10
1958–59	Hershey Bears	AHL	58	12	23	55	58	13	1	4	5	30
1959–60	Hershey Bears	AHL	61	14	28	42	71	—	—	—	—	—
1960–61	Hershey Bears	AHL	72	15	41	56	71	8	3	7	10	11
1960–61	Montreal Royals	EPHL	1	0	0	0	0	—	—	—	—	—
1961–62	Hershey Bears	AHL	64	21	36	57	19	7	0	2	2	0
1962–63	St. Louis Braves	EPHL	26	6	24	30	57	—	—	—	—	—
1963–64	Clinton Comets	EHL	62	27	75	102	33	15	11	10	21	11
1964–65	Clinton Comets	EHL	62	31	69	100	18	11	4	8	12	4
1965–66	Jersey Devils	EHL	38	8	25	33	2	—	—	—	—	—
1966–67	Innsbrucker EV	AUT	9	6	4	10	12	—	—	—	—	—
1966–67	Jersey Devils	EHL	18	7	20	27	10	16	8	8	16	2
1967–68	Jersey Devils	EHL	2	1	0	1	0	—	—	—	—	—
1967–68	Belleville Mohawks	OHA Sr	28	5	12	17	2	—	—	—	—	—
AHL totals			282	74	138	212	250	39	7	17	24	51
NHL totals			151	21	39	60	118	—	—	—	—	—

== Awards and achievements ==
- Calder Cup: 1957–58, 1958–59 (Hershey Bears – AHL)
- Atlantic City Boardwalk Trophy: 1963–64 (Clinton Comets – EHL)
- Walker Cup: 1963–64 (Clinton Comets – EHL)
- North Bay Sports Hall of Fame: 1986
