= 1958–59 Austrian Hockey League season =

Austrian ice hockey season

The 1958–59 Austrian Hockey League season was the 29th season of the Austrian Hockey League, the top level of ice hockey in Austria. Six teams participated in the league, and EV Innsbruck won the championship.

== Regular season ==
	Team	GP	W	L	T	GF	GA	Pts
1.	EV Innsbruck	10	7	0	0	73	15	18
2.	EC KAC	10	7	3	0	50	30	14
3.	EC Kitzbühel	10	5	5	0	78	36	10
4.	SV Leoben	10	3	6	1	29	46	7
5.	EC VSV	10	3	6	1	33	70	7
6.	Wiener JSV	10	7	7	7	21	76	7
