= Bud Stefanski =

Canadian ice hockey player

- Born: April 28, 1955 (age 70); South Porcupine, Ontario, Canada
- Height: 5 ft 10 in (178 cm)
- Weight: 170 lb (77 kg; 12 st 2 lb)
- Position: Centre
- Shot: Left
- Played for: New York Rangers
- NHL draft: 154th overall, 1975; New York Rangers
- Playing career: 1975–1987

Stanley Michael "Bud" Stefanski (born April 28, 1955) is a Canadian former professional ice hockey centre who played one game in the National Hockey League for the New York Rangers during the 1977–78 NHL season. He is also a former head coach of the Ontario Hockey League's Barrie Colts and Toronto St. Michael's Majors. His son-in-law is Cory Stillman and his grandchildren are Riley Stillman and Chase Stillman.

== Career statistics ==
			Regular season					Playoffs
Season	Team	League	GP	G	A	Pts	PIM	GP	G	A	Pts	PIM
1973–74	Oshawa Generals	OHA-Jr.	67	25	32	57	22	—	—	—	—	—
1974–75	Oshawa Generals	OMJHL	61	18	48	66	35	5	2	2	4	14
1975–76	Port Huron Flags	IHL	71	26	30	56	59	15	4	4	8	16
1976–77	Port Huron Flags	IHL	77	49	54	103	61	—	—	—	—	—
1976–77	New Haven Nighthawks	AHL	—	—	—	—	—	2	1	0	1	0
1977–78	New York Rangers	NHL	1	0	0	0	0	—	—	—	—	—
1977–78	New Haven Nighthawks	AHL	79	27	37	64	61	15	5	4	9	6
1978–79	New Haven Nighthawks	AHL	51	18	40	58	71	10	3	7	10	21
1979–80	Tulsa Oilers	CHL	71	19	44	63	61	3	0	0	0	9
1980–81	EC VSV	AUT	34	32	40	72	71	—	—	—	—	—
1980–81	New Haven Nighthawks	AHL	20	9	18	27	46	4	0	1	1	8
1981–82	EC VSV	AUT	38	32	64	96	94	—	—	—	—	—
1981–82	New Haven Nighthawks	AHL	16	6	5	11	24	4	2	1	3	11
1982–83	Springfield Indians	AHL	80	30	40	70	65	—	—	—	—	—
1983–84	Maine Mariners	AHL	57	26	24	50	47	17	12	9	21	16
1984–85	Maine Mariners	AHL	75	19	34	53	67	11	1	7	8	12
1985–86	Maine Mariners	AHL	68	32	39	71	70	2	0	0	0	6
1986–87	Maine Mariners	AHL	29	9	12	21	34	—	—	—	—	—
AHL totals			475	176	249	425	485	65	24	29	53	80

== See also ==
- List of players who played only one game in the NHL
