= Richard Grenier =

Richard Grenier may refer to:

- Richard Grenier (ice hockey) (born 1952), Canadian ice hockey player
- Richard Grenier (newspaper columnist) (1926–2002), American columnist and film critic
