= 1962–63 Austrian Hockey League season =

Austrian ice hockey season

The 1962–63 Austrian Hockey League season was the 33rd season of the Austrian Hockey League, the top level of ice hockey in Austria. Seven teams participated in the league, and Innsbrucker EV won the championship.

== Regular season ==
	Team	GP	W	L	T	GF	GA	Pts
1.	Innsbrucker EV	12	12	0	0	88	13	24
2.	Wiener EV	12	9	3	0	88	23	18
3.	Klangenfurter AC	12	9	3	0	77	27	18
4.	EC Kitzbühel	12	6	6	0	60	45	12
5.	SV Ehrwald	12	3	9	0	27	78	6
6.	EK Zell am See	12	2	10	0	38	89	4
7.	Villacher SV	12	1	11	0	23	126	2
