= 1980–81 Austrian Hockey League season =

Austrian ice hockey season

The 1980–81 Austrian Hockey League season was the 51st season of the Austrian Hockey League, the top level of ice hockey in Austria. Eight teams participated in the league, and EC VSV won the championship.

== First round ==
	Team	GP	W	L	T	GF	GA	Pts
1.	Kapfenberger SV	28	17	6	5	131	103	39
2.	EC VSV	28	17	8	3	135	102	37
3.	Wiener EV	28	13	10	5	124	110	31
4.	ECS Innsbruck	28	14	12	2	141	120	30
5.	HC Salzburg	28	10	10	8	86	91	28
6.	EC KAC	28	10	14	4	123	121	24
7.	VEU Feldkirch	28	8	17	3	115	163	19
8.	WAT Stadlau	28	6	18	4	74	119	16

== Final round ==
	Team	GP	W	L	T	GF	GA	Pts (Bonus)
1.	EC VSV	6	4	1	1	39	18	12 (3)
2.	Wiener EV	6	4	2	0	31	24	10 (2)
3.	Kapfenberger SV	6	1	3	2	24	37	8 (4)
4.	ECS Innsbruck	6	1	4	1	28	43	4 (1)

== Qualification round ==
	Team	GP	W	L	T	GF	GA	Pts (Bonus)
5.	VEU Feldkirch	6	4	1	1	46	26	11 (2)
6.	EC KAC	6	3	2	1	17	21	10 (3)
7.	HC Salzburg	6	2	3	1	22	25	9 (4)
8.	WAT Stadlau	6	1	4	1	20	33	4 (1)

WAT Stadlau avoided relegation as ATSE Graz declined to be promoted.
