= 1978–79 Austrian Hockey League season =

Austrian ice hockey season

The 1978–79 Austrian Hockey League season was the 49th season of the Austrian Hockey League, the top level of ice hockey in Austria. Eight teams participated in the league, and EC KAC won the championship.

== First round ==
	Team	GP	W	L	T	GF	GA	Pts
1.	Kapfenberger SV	28	20	6	2	163	93	42
2.	ECS Innsbruck	28	19	5	4	148	90	42
3.	EC KAC	28	16	6	2	189	119	40
4.	Wiener EV	28	14	9	4	131	102	34
5.	EC VSV	28	12	13	3	143	124	27
6.	ATSE Graz	28	9	18	1	108	135	19
7.	VEU Feldkirch	28	6	19	3	117	206	15
8.	HC Salzburg	28	1	24	3	99	229	5

== Final round ==
	Team	GP	W	L	T	GF	GA	Pts (Bonus)
1.	EC KAC	6	4	1	1	28	16	11 (2)
2.	Kapfenberger SV	6	1	2	3	16	23	9 (4)
3.	Wiener EV	6	3	2	1	18	15	8 (1)
4.	ECS Innsbruck	6	1	4	1	18	26	6 (3)

== 5th-8th place ==
	Team	GP	W	L	T	GF	GA	Pts (Bonus)
5.	EC VSV	6	5	1	0	38	26	14 (4)
6.	ATSE Graz	6	3	1	2	32	16	11 (3)
7.	VEU Feldkirch	6	1	4	1	16	36	5 (2)
8.	HC Salzburg	6	1	4	1	20	28	4 (1)
