= Garry Blaine =

Canadian ice hockey player

- Born: April 19, 1933; Saint Boniface, Manitoba, Canada
- Died: December 19, 1998 (aged 65)
- Height: 5 ft 11 in (180 cm)
- Weight: 190 lb (86 kg; 13 st 8 lb)
- Position: Right wing
- Shot: Right
- Played for: Montreal Canadiens
- Playing career: 1953–1960

Garry James Blaine (April 19, 1933 – December 19, 1998) was a Canadian ice hockey player. He played one game in the National Hockey League with the Montreal Canadiens during the 1954–55 season. The rest of his career, which lasted from 1953 to 1960, was spent in the minor leagues.

== Biography ==
Blaine began his professional hockey career with the Montreal Royals in the Quebec Hockey League in 1953. Blaine then played his one and only game in the National Hockey League for the Montreal Canadiens the next season, on January 2, 1955 against the Detroit Red Wings. He would then have spells in the QHL with the Trois-Rivières Lions, Chicoutimi Saguenéens and the Quebec Aces, the Western Hockey League with the Winnipeg Warriors and the Vancouver Canucks, the American Hockey League for the Buffalo Bisons and in the Eastern Professional Hockey League for the Sault Thunderbirds. With traveling becoming a big problem, Blaine retired in 1960.

== Career statistics ==
=== Regular season and playoffs ===
| | | | Regular season | | | | | Playoffs |
| Season | Team | League | GP | G | A | Pts | PIM | GP | G | A | Pts | PIM |
|---|---|---|---|---|---|---|---|---|---|---|---|---|
| 1950–51 | Winnipeg Canadiens | MJHL | 33 | 13 | 14 | 27 | 45 | — | — | — | — | — |
| 1951–52 | St. Boniface Canadiens | MJHL | 35 | 14 | 18 | 32 | 45 | 5 | 3 | 1 | 4 | 0 |
| 1952–53 | St. Boniface Canadiens | MJHL | 17 | 16 | 15 | 31 | 50 | 8 | 6 | 6 | 12 | 10 |
| 1952–53 | St. Boniface Canadiens | M-Cup | — | — | — | — | — | 17 | 17 | 10 | 27 | 21 |
| 1953–54 | Montreal Royals | QSHL | 54 | 11 | 20 | 31 | 24 | 11 | 2 | 6 | 8 | 6 |
| 1954–55 | Montreal Canadiens | NHL | 1 | 0 | 0 | 0 | 0 | — | — | — | — | — |
| 1954–55 | Montreal Royals | QSHL | 53 | 18 | 31 | 49 | 56 | 14 | 5 | 11 | 16 | 2 |
| 1955–56 | Trois-Rivières Lions | QSHL | 22 | 6 | 6 | 12 | 4 | — | — | — | — | — |
| 1955–56 | Winnipeg Warriors | WHL | 40 | 9 | 12 | 21 | 20 | — | — | — | — | — |
| 1956–57 | Chicoutimi Saguenéens | QSHL | 12 | 2 | 6 | 8 | 2 | — | — | — | — | — |
| 1956–57 | Buffalo Bisons | AHL | 14 | 7 | 6 | 13 | 8 | — | — | — | — | — |
| 1956–57 | Springfield Indians | AHL | 29 | 6 | 8 | 14 | 12 | — | — | — | — | — |
| 1957–58 | Quebec Aces | QSHL | 62 | 23 | 38 | 61 | 28 | 13 | 3 | 5 | 8 | 12 |
| 1958–59 | Vancouver Canucks | WHL | 67 | 16 | 19 | 35 | 60 | 8 | 1 | 2 | 3 | 10 |
| 1959–60 | Sault Thunderbirds | EPHL | 70 | 20 | 37 | 57 | 54 | — | — | — | — | — |
| QSHL totals | | | 203 | 60 | 101 | 161 | 114 | 38 | 10 | 22 | 32 | 20 |
| NHL totals | | | 1 | 0 | 0 | 0 | 0 | — | — | — | — | — |

== See also ==
- List of players who played only one game in the NHL
