= 1982–83 Austrian Hockey League season =

Austrian ice hockey season

The 1982–83 Austrian Hockey League season was the 53rd season of the Austrian Hockey League, the top level of ice hockey in Austria. Eight teams participated in the league, and VEU Feldkirch won the championship.

== First round ==
| | Team | GP | W | L | T | GF | GA | Pts |
|---|---|---|---|---|---|---|---|---|
| 1. | VEU Feldkirch | 28 | 19 | 7 | 2 | 162 | 107 | 40 |
| 2. | EC KAC | 28 | 17 | 8 | 3 | 173 | 129 | 37 |
| 3. | Wiener EV | 28 | 16 | 9 | 3 | 129 | 83 | 35 |
| 4. | EC VSV | 28 | 13 | 8 | 7 | 147 | 110 | 33 |
| 5. | ECS Innsbruck | 28 | 11 | 11 | 6 | 135 | 130 | 28 |
| 6. | Kapfenberger SV | 28 | 11 | 13 | 4 | 124 | 141 | 26 |
| 7. | WAT Stadlau | 28 | 6 | 14 | 8 | 141 | 160 | 20 |
| 8. | EHC Lustenau | 28 | 1 | 26 | 1 | 99 | 250 | 3 |

== Final round ==
| | Team | GP | W | L | T | GF | GA | Pts (Bonus) |
|---|---|---|---|---|---|---|---|---|
| 1. | VEU Feldkirch | 10 | 7 | 2 | 1 | 52 | 30 | 19 (4) |
| 2. | EC KAC | 10 | 6 | 2 | 2 | 55 | 34 | 17 (3) |
| 3. | EC VSV | 10 | 5 | 4 | 1 | 59 | 45 | 12 (1) |
| 4. | ECS Innsbruck | 10 | 5 | 3 | 2 | 49 | 44 | 12 (0) |
| 5. | Wiener EV | 10 | 3 | 7 | 0 | 32 | 54 | 8 (2) |
| 6. | Kapfenberger SV | 10 | 1 | 9 | 0 | 32 | 72 | 2 (0) |

== Relegation ==
- WAT Stadlau - EHC Lustenau 3:0 (3:1, 7:4, 9:4)

EHC Lustenau was relegated.
