= 1979–80 Austrian Hockey League season =

Austrian ice hockey season

The 1979–80 Austrian Hockey League season was the 50th season of the Austrian Hockey League, the top level of ice hockey in Austria. Eight teams participated in the league, and EC KAC won the championship.

== First round ==
	Team
1.	Wiener EV
2.	EC KAC
3.	ESC Innsbruck
4.	Kapfenberger SV
5.	EC VSV
6.	VEU Feldkirch
7.	HC Salzburg
8.	ATSE Graz

== Final round ==
	Team	GP	W	L	T	GF	GA	Pts (Bonus)
1.	EC KAC	12	8	3	1	68	43	20 (3)
2.	Wiener EV	12	6	3	3	55	42	19 (4)
3.	ESC Innssbruck	12	3	7	2	49	57	10 (2)
4.	Kapfenberger SV	12	3	7	2	30	60	9 (1)

== Qualification round ==
	Team	GP	W	L	T	GF	GA	Pts (Bonus)
5.	EC VSV	6	3	2	1	29	20	11 (4)
6.	VEU Feldkirch	6	2	2	2	32	33	9 (3)
7.	HC Salzburg	6	2	2	2	20	27	8 (2)
8.	ATSE Graz	6	2	3	1	23	26	6 (1)
