= 1981–82 Austrian Hockey League season =

Austrian ice hockey season

The 1981–82 Austrian Hockey League season was the 52nd season of the Austrian Hockey League, the top level of ice hockey in Austria. Eight teams participated in the league, and VEU Feldkirch won the championship.

== First round ==
	Team	GP	W	L	T	GF	GA	Pts
1.	EC KAC	28	21	5	2	170	107	44
2.	VEU Feldkirch	28	18	7	3	155	99	39
3.	HC Salzburg	28	17	9	2	151	105	36
4.	Wiener EV	28	14	9	5	129	113	33
5.	EC VSV	28	10	13	5	137	117	25
6.	Kapfenberger SV	28	9	14	5	122	149	23
7.	ECS Innsbruck	28	8	18	2	117	164	18
8.	WAT Stadlau	28	2	26	0	82	209	4

== Final round ==
	Team	GP	W	L	T	GF	GA	Pts (Bonus)
1.	VEU Feldkirch	10	7	2	1	61	31	19 (4)
2.	EC KAC	10	6	4	0	52	42	17 (5)
3.	Wiener EV	10	6	3	1	60	42	15 (2)
4.	HC Salzburg	10	4	5	1	44	47	12 (3)
5.	EC VSV	10	3	3	4	45	47	11 (1)
6.	Kapfenberger SV	10	0	9	1	30	83	1 (0)

== Relegation ==
- ECS Innsbruck - WAT Stadlau 3:0 (6:5 OT, 4:2, 6:2)

WAT Stadlau avoided relegation as HC Salzburg folded due to bankruptcy.
