= 1990–91 Austrian Hockey League season =

Austrian ice hockey season

The 1990–91 Austrian Hockey League season was the 61st season of the Austrian Hockey League, the top level of ice hockey in Austria. Six teams participated in the league, and EC KAC won the championship.

== Regular season ==
Place	Team	GP	W	L	GF–GA	Pts
1	ATSE Graz	30	23	7	171:110	46
2	EC VSV	30	19	11	137:105	38
3	Wiener EV	30	18	12	131:136	36
4	VEU Feldkirch	30	14	16	133:130	28
5	EC KAC	30	11	19	111:132	22
6	EV Innsbruck	30	5	25	92:162	10

== Playoffs ==
=== Quarterfinals ===
- ATSE Graz (1) - VEU Feldkirch (4): 1:3 (2:4, 3:6, 3:2, 3:10)
- EC VSV (2) - EC KAC (5): 0:3 (2:4, 3:4, 3:6)
- Wiener EV (3) - EV Innsbruck (6): 3:2 (9:1, 3:6, 4:1, 4:5, 5:3)

=== Placing round ===
Place	Team	GP	S	N	GF–GA	Pts
1	EC VSV	4	3	1	25:14	6
2	ATSE Graz	4	2	2	16:13	4
3	EV Innsbruck	4	1	3	10:24	2

=== Semifinals ===
- EC KAC (5) - Wiener EV (3): 3:1 (6:4, 4:5, 3:2, 6:3)
- VEU Feldkirch (4) - EC VSV (2): 0:3 (2:4, 3:4, 5:9)

=== Final ===
- EC VSV (2) - EC KAC (5): 1:3 (5:6 SO., 3:7, 3:0, 3:4)
