= 1985–86 Austrian Hockey League season =

Austrian ice hockey season

The 1985–86 Austrian Hockey League season was the 56th season of the Austrian Hockey League, the top level of ice hockey in Austria. Six teams participated in the league, and EC KAC won the championship.

== First round ==
	Team	GP	W	L	T	GF	GA	Pts
1.	EC KAC	30	18	8	4	150	100	40
2.	VEU Feldkirch	30	16	9	5	124	123	37
3.	EC VSV	30	16	10	4	154	118	36
4.	EV Innsbruck	30	14	10	6	127	110	34
5.	Wiener EV	30	9	17	4	123	165	22
6.	EHC Lustenau	30	4	23	3	107	169	11

== Final round ==
	Team	GP	W	L	T	GF	GA	Pts (Bonus)
1.	EC KAC	10	7	3	0	65	37	18 (4)
2.	EC VSV	10	7	2	1	54	36	17 (2)
3.	VEU Feldkirch	10	6	3	1	42	34	16 (3)
4.	EV Innsbruck	10	5	4	1	45	51	12 (1)
5.	EHC Lustenau	10	2	8	0	46	70	4 (0)
6.	Wiener EV	10	1	8	1	31	55	3 (0)

== Playoffs ==
=== Semifinals ===
- EC KAC - EV Innsbruck 2:0 (6:5 SO, 4:1)
- EV VSV - VEU Feldkirch 0:2 (3:5, 1:6)

=== Final ===
- EC KAC - VEU Feldkirch 2:0 (11:5, 6:1)
