= 1986–87 Austrian Hockey League season =

Austrian ice hockey season

The 1986–87 Austrian Hockey League season was the 57th season of the Austrian Hockey League, the top level of ice hockey in Austria. Seven teams participated in the league, and EC KAC won the championship.

== First round ==
	Team	GP	W	L	T	GF	GA	Pts
1.	EC KAC	24	16	5	3	129	79	35
2.	VEU Feldkirch	24	17	7	0	111	83	34
3.	EV Innsbruck	24	14	8	2	126	99	30
4.	EC VSV	24	10	11	3	101	96	23
5.	Wiener EV	24	8	10	6	108	114	22
6.	EHC Lustenau	24	10	14	0	138	130	20
7.	EC Salzburg	24	0	20	4	65	177	4

== Final round ==
	Team	GP	W	L	T	GF	GA	Pts (Bonus)
1.	EV Innsbruck	10	9	0	1	61	28	21 (2)
2.	EC KAC	10	7	2	1	49	31	19 (4)
3.	VEU Feldkirch	10	2	4	4	39	40	11 (3)
4.	Wiener EV	10	4	4	2	34	32	10 (0)
5.	EC VSV	10	3	7	0	36	51	7 (1)
6.	EHC Lustenau	10	0	8	2	33	70	2 (0)

== Playoffs ==
=== Semifinals ===
- EV Innsbruck - Wiener EV 1:3 (6:3, 3:4 OT, 2:4, 1:3)
- EC KAC - VEU Feldkirch 3:0 (6:3, 5:1, 5:2)

=== 3rd place ===
- EV Innsbruck defeated VEU Feldkirch

=== Final ===
- EC KAC - Wiener EV 3:0 (6:3, 5:4 SO, 5:4)
