= 1988–89 Austrian Hockey League season =

Austrian ice hockey season

The 1988–89 Austrian Hockey League season was the 59th season of the Austrian Hockey League, the top level of ice hockey in Austria. Six teams participated in the league, and GEV Innsbruck won the championship.

== First round ==
| Rank | Team | GP | W | T | L | GF–GA | Diff | Pts |
|---|---|---|---|---|---|---|---|---|
| 1 | EC VSV | 20 | 14 | 4 | 2 | 99:56 | +43 | 32 |
| 2 | GEV Innsbruck | 20 | 11 | 3 | 6 | 95:57 | +38 | 25 |
| 3 | EC KAC | 20 | 10 | 4 | 6 | 93:84 | +9 | 24 |
| 4 | VEU Feldkirch | 20 | 6 | 2 | 12 | 70:104 | -34 | 14 |
| 5 | EHC Lustenau | 20 | 5 | 3 | 12 | 74:89 | -15 | 13 |
| 6 | Wiener EV | 20 | 4 | 4 | 12 | 66:97 | -31 | 12 |

== Second round ==
| Rank | Team | GP | W | T | L | GF–GA | Diff | Pts (Bonus) |
|---|---|---|---|---|---|---|---|---|
| 1 | EC VSV | 20 | 14 | 1 | 5 | 110:68 | +42 | 33 (4) |
| 2 | GEV Innsbruck | 20 | 11 | 0 | 9 | 93:94 | -1 | 25 (3) |
| 3 | EC KAC | 20 | 11 | 0 | 9 | 106:74 | +32 | 24 (2) |
| 4 | VEU Feldkirch | 20 | 9 | 2 | 9 | 82:106 | -24 | 21 (1) |
| 5 | Wiener EV | 20 | 8 | 1 | 11 | 78:91 | -13 | 17 (0) |
| 6 | EHC Lustenau | 20 | 5 | 0 | 15 | 94:130 | -36 | 10 (0) |

== Playoffs ==
| Rank | Team | GP | W | T | L | GF–GA | Diff | Pts |
|---|---|---|---|---|---|---|---|---|
| 1 | GEV Innsbruck | 6 | 4 | 1 | 1 | 28:22 | +6 | 9 |
| 2 | EC VSV | 6 | 3 | 1 | 2 | 19:18 | +1 | 7 |
| 3 | VEU Feldkirch | 6 | 2 | 0 | 4 | 27:27 | 0 | 4 |
| 4 | EC KAC | 6 | 2 | 0 | 4 | 19:26 | -7 | 4 |
