= 1984–85 Austrian Hockey League season =

Austrian ice hockey season

The 1984–85 Austrian Hockey League season was the 55th season of the Austrian Hockey League, the top level of ice hockey in Austria. Seven teams participated in the league, and EC KAC won the championship.

== First round ==
	Team	GP	W	L	T	GF	GA	Pts
1.	EV Innsbruck	24	16	4	4	121	67	36
2.	EHC Lustenau	24	13	8	3	153	98	29
3.	EC KAC	24	12	8	4	122	110	28
4.	VEU Feldkirch	24	11	8	5	109	92	27
5.	EC VSV	24	8	7	9	117	90	25
6.	WAT Stadlau	24	8	11	5	92	107	21
7.	Grazer SV	24	0	22	2	61	211	2

== Final round ==
	Team	GP	W	L	T	GF	GA	Pts (Bonus)
1.	EHC Lustenau	10	7	3	0	50	43	17 (3)
2.	EV Innsbruck	10	5	3	2	37	31	16 (4)
3.	VEU Feldkirch	10	7	3	0	46	26	15 (1)
4.	EC KAC	10	3	5	2	38	52	10 (2)
5.	EC VSV	10	3	7	0	37	45	6 (0)
6.	WAT Stadlau	10	2	6	2	34	45	6 (0)

== Playoffs ==
=== Semifinals ===
- EHC Lustenau - EC KAC 1:2 (6:2, 3:5, 3:6)
- EV Innsbruck - VEU Feldkirch 2:1 (9:3, 2:3 OT, 8:1)

=== Final ===
- EV Innsbruck - EC KAC 0:2 (2:6, 2:5)
