= 1983–84 Austrian Hockey League season =

Austrian ice hockey season

The 1983–84 Austrian Hockey League season was the 54th season of the Austrian Hockey League, the top level of ice hockey in Austria. Eight teams participated in the league, and VEU Feldkirch won the championship.

== First round ==
	Team	GP	W	L	T	GF	GA	Pts
1.	VEU Feldkirch	28	20	5	3	141	92	43
2.	EC VSV	28	17	6	5	153	100	38
3.	ECS Innsbruck	28	17	6	5	137	88	38
4.	EC KAC	28	14	12	2	151	125	30
5.	Kapfenberger SV	28	13	14	1	127	135	27
6.	WAT Stadlau	28	10	16	2	121	135	22
7.	Wiener EV	28	9	17	2	112	155	20
8.	Grazer SV	28	2	26	0	88	201	4

== Final round ==
	Team	GP	W	L	T	GF	GA	Pts (Bonus)
1.	VEU Feldkirch	10	6	3	1	46	41	17 (4)
2.	EC VSV	10	6	4	0	55	40	15 (3)
3.	WAT Stadlau	10	5	4	1	45	41	11 (0)
4.	Kapfenberger SV	10	5	5	0	43	60	10 (0)
5.	ECS Innsbruck	10	3	6	1	47	53	9 (2)
6.	EC KAC	10	3	6	1	41	43	8 (1)

== Relegation ==
- Wiener EV - Grazer SV 0:3 (4:7, 3:5, 5:10)

Wiener EV was relegated.
