= 1989–90 Austrian Hockey League season =

Austrian ice hockey season

The 1989–90 Austrian Hockey League season was the 60th season of the Austrian Hockey League, the top level of ice hockey in Austria. Eight teams participated in the league, and VEU Feldkirch won the championship.

== Regular season ==
Rank	Team	GP	W	T	L	GF–GA	Diff	Pts
1	VEU Feldkirch	28	22	1	5	164:96	+68	45
2	Innsbrucker EV	28	16	3	9	139:105	+34	35
3	EC VSV	28	14	2	12	124:104	+20	30
4	EC KAC	28	13	3	12	117:110	+7	29
5	ATSE Graz	28	13	2	13	134:121	+13	28
6	Wiener EV	28	10	1	17	106:144	-38	21
7	EHC Lustenau	28	8	3	17	91:136	-45	19
8	Kapfenberger SV	28	8	1	19	116:175	-59	17

== Playoffs ==
=== Quarterfinals ===
Series	Final standing	Game 1	Game 2	Game 3	Game 4	Game 5
VEU Feldkirch (1) - Kapfenberger SV (8)	3:0	14:6	10:6	7:6	–	–
Innsbrucker EV (2) - EHC Lustenau (7)	3:0	6:4	5:0	5:1	–	–
EC VSV (3) - Wiener EV (6)	3:0	5:2	7:2	6:4	–	–
EC KAC (4) - ATSE Graz (5)	3:2	6:3	0:6	2:1 OT	4:5	12:7

=== Semifinals ===
Series	Final standing	Game 1	Game 2	Game 3	Game 4	Game 5
VEU Feldkirch (1) - EC KAC (4)	3:1	4:1	3:4 OT	3:2 OT	5:3	–
Innsbrucker EV (2) - EC VSV (3)	1:3	3:2 SO	2:3	2:5	0:4	–

=== Final ===
Series	Final standing	Game 1	Game 2	Game 3	Game 4	Game 5
VEU Feldkirch (1) - EC VSV(3)	3:1	4:1	2:6	8:6	5:4 OT	–

=== 5th-8th place ===
Series	Final standing	Game 1	Game 2	Game 3
ATSE Graz (5) - Kapfenberger SV (8)	2:1	6:5	2:7	6:2
Wiener EV (6) - EHC Lustenau (7)	2:1	5:8	6:5 OT	5:3

=== Relegation ===
Series	Final standing	Game 1	Game 2
EHC Lustenau (7) - Kapfenberger SV (8)	0:2	1:4	4:7

EHC Lustenau was relegated.
