= 1987–88 Austrian Hockey League season =

Austrian ice hockey season

The 1987–88 Austrian Hockey League season was the 58th season of the Austrian Hockey League, the top level of ice hockey in Austria. Seven teams participated in the league, and EC KAC won the championship.

== First round ==
	Team	GP	W	L	T	GF	GA	Pts
1.	EC KAC	24	13	5	6	129	85	32
2.	Wiener EV	24	13	5	6	100	83	32
3.	EV Innsbruck	24	13	7	4	112	86	30
4.	EC Salzburg	24	12	7	5	91	90	29
5.	EC VSV	24	10	9	5	89	86	25
6.	VEU Feldkirch	24	6	13	5	112	134	17
7.	EHC Lustenau	24	0	21	3	67	136	3

== Final round ==
	Team	GP	W	L	T	GF	GA	Pts (Bonus)
1.	EC KAC	10	6	2	2	49	36	18 (4)
2.	Wiener EV	10	5	3	2	45	34	15 (3)
3.	EC VSV	10	5	4	1	43	41	11 (0)
4.	VEU Feldkirch	10	4	4	2	39	45	10 (0)
5.	EV Innsbruck	10	3	5	2	36	46	10 (2)
6.	EC Salzburg	10	2	7	1	42	52	6 (1)
