= EC KAC =

Austrian ice hockey club (founded 1909)

Klagenfurt AC
- City: Klagenfurt, Carinthia, Austria
- League: ICE Hockey League
- Founded: 1909; 117 years ago
- Home arena: Stadthalle (Capacity: 5,500)
- Colors
- Owner: EC-KAC Betriebs GmbH
- General manager: Oliver Pilloni
- Head coach: Kirk Furey
- Captain: Thomas Hundertpfund
- Website: EC KAC

Franchise history
- 1909–: EC KAC

Championships
- Austrian Champions: 32 (1934, 1935, 1952, 1955, 1960, 1964, 1965, 1966, 1967, 1968, 1969, 1970, 1971, 1972, 1973, 1974, 1976, 1977, 1979, 1980, 1985, 1986, 1987, 1988, 1991, 2000, 2001, 2004, 2009, 2013, 2019, 2021)

Klagenfurt Athletic Sports Club or EC KAC (German: Klagenfurter Athletiksport Club) is an Austrian professional ice hockey team in the ICE Hockey League. The team plays their home games in Klagenfurt, Carinthia, Austria at Stadthalle. EC KAC has won the most Austrian ice hockey Championships, a total of 32 times including 11 consecutive titles from 1964 to 1974, and four consecutive from 1985 to 1988. Most recently they won it in 2021.

== History ==
The Klagenfurt Athletic Sports Club was founded on 18 September 1909 as an association. In 1919 the first attempts to establish an ice hockey team were trialled with an initial two-year apprenticeship from 1923 to 1925, before hockey was established as a full-fledged association in 1926.

In 1926, EC KAC joined the Austrian Ice Hockey Federation. At that time, there were no uniforms and the hockey players wore gym shorts, soccer socks, football jerseys, and skates known as Friesen, which used shoes made of wood with a metal bar as a runner, which were laced with leather straps on the feet. The puck was initially made from two soles of women's shoes nailed together. Much depended more on the ingenuity and dedication of the players and the preparation of the ice surface at the Kreuzberglteich.

In the 1933–34 season, EC KAC won its first league title and thus stopped the almost uninterrupted dominance of the Vienna Ice Skating Association. It marked the first time the title had not been awarded to a team from Vienna. The Second World War interrupted play abruptly and post-war it took a long time to get the league back functioning properly. However, many stars from the KAC's first league title success could again be counted to be the nucleus and further accelerated the rise of EC KAC well into the 1950s.

Between 1952 and 1960, KAC managed three further League titles, in a period in which Innsbruck EV were prominent in the Austrian Championship. With games still played outdoors and susceptible to inclement weather, on 22 November 1959, the Stadthalle Klagenfurt complex opened, which after several modifications is still in use today as the home rink of EC KAC.

At the turn of the 1960s, with the influx of influential players such as Dieter Kalt Snr and Sepp Puschnig, KAC sowed the seeds in dominating the Austrian championship from 1964 to 1980, in which the title went fifteen times to Klagenfurt. The team's only serious challenger in that time was ATSE Graz, which broke through with titles in 1975 and 1978.

During this time, EC KAC also partook in several European Cups. They first played in the 1965–66 season, and in the following 1966–67 season, the team reached the semi-finals and had to compete, as in the following season, against ZLK Brno. In 1969–70, EC KAC reached the final against HC CSKA Moscow, where they lost. Overall, EC KAC participated in the tournament nineteen times; only two fewer than the record held by CSKA Moscow.

== Players ==
=== Current roster ===
Updated 17 June 2025.

No.	Nat	Player	Pos	S/G	Age	Acquired	Birthplace
32	(Denmark)	Sebastian Dahm	G	L	39	2020	Copenhagen, Denmark
81	(Austria)	Finn van Ee	C	L	23	2020	Zell am See, Austria
90	(Canada)	Matt Fraser (A)	LW	L	36	2020	Red Deer, Alberta, Canada
77	(Denmark)	Mathias From	LW	R	28	2024	Frederikshavn, Denmark
68	(Slovenia)	Luca Gomboc	LW	L	23	2022	Kranj, Slovenia
89	(Austria)	Raphael Herburger	C	L	37	2023	Dornbirn, Austria
97	(Austria)	Fabian Hochegger	C	R	25	2021	Klagenfurt, Austria
27	(Austria)	Thomas Hundertpfund (C)	C	L	36	2014	Klagenfurt, Austria
41	(Denmark)	Jesper Jensen Aabo (A)	D	L	35	2022	Rødovre, Denmark
12	(Austria)	David Maier	D	R	26	2020	St. Veit an der Glan, Austria
4	(Canada)	Jordan Murray	D	L	33	2025	Riverview, New Brunswick, Canada
9	(Slovenia)	Jan Muršak	RW	R	38	2023	Maribor, SR Slovenia, SFR Yugoslavia
82	(Austria)	Thimo Nickl	D	R	24	2024	Klagenfurt, Austria
98	(Austria)	Daniel Obersteiner	C	L	28	2015	St. Veit an der Glan, Austria
8	(Canada)	Nick Petersen	RW	R	37	2018	Wakefield, Quebec, Canada
64	(Austria)	Maximilian Preiml	D	R	23	2022	Steindorf am Ossiacher See, Austria
6	(Austria)	Tobias Sablattnig	D	L	23	2023	St. Veit an der Glan, Austria
16	(Austria)	Simeon Schwinger	LW	L	29	2022	Dornbirn, Austria
92	(Austria)	Clemens Unterweger (A)	D	L	34	2018	Lienz, Austria
33	(Austria)	Florian Vorauer	G	L	26	2022	Klagenfurt, Austria
