= WAT Stadlau =

WAT Stadlau (short for Wiener ASKÖ Team Stadlau) is a sport club in Vienna Donaustadt, Austria. The club celebrated his biggest success in ice hockey and judo.

== Judo ==
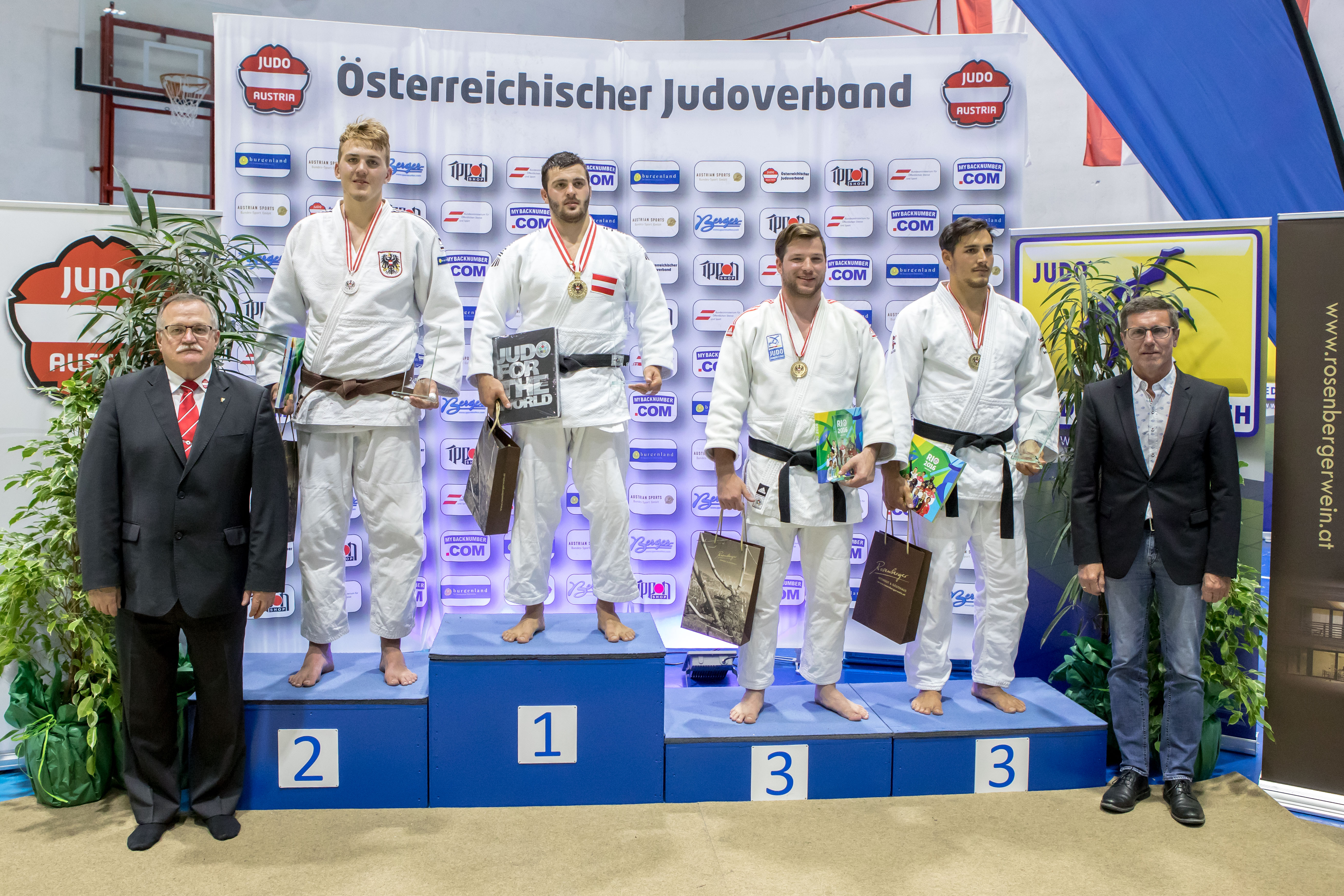
Niko Herzog takes 2nd place at the Austrian State Championships -100 kg

=== Achievements ===
- 1983: 8th place Austrian National League (men)
- 1988: 8th place Austrian National League (men)
- 2013: 2nd place Austrian League (women)
- 2015: 3rd place Austrian League (women)

== Ice Hockey ==
WAT Stadlau
- City: Vienna, Austria
- League: Austrian Hockey League
- Founded: 1914; 112 years ago
- Dissolved: 1991; 35 years ago
- Website: www.wat-stadlau.at

The ice hockey team played in the Austrian Hockey League, the top level of ice hockey in Austria, and the Austrian National League, the second level Austrian league. The ice hockey division folded in 1991.

=== Achievements ===
- 1971-72: 3rd place in Austrian Hockey League
- 1979-80: 1st place in Austrian National League
