= EC Kitzbühel =

EC Kitzbuhel
- City: Kitzbühel, Austria
- League: Alps Hockey League
- Founded: 1910; 116 years ago
- Home arena: Sportpark Kapserbrucke
- Colours: Blue, yellow
- Head coach: Jeff Job
- Website: http://www.dieadler.at/start/

EC Kitzbuhel is a professional ice hockey team in Kitzbühel, Austria.

== History ==
EC Kitzbuhel was founded in 1910. The club competed at the Spengler Cup in 1965, with Derek Holmes as the tournament's most valuable player.

From 1965–1973, Kitzbuhel played in the Erste Bank Eishockey Liga, the top level of ice hockey in Austria. In their eight seasons there, the club never finished higher than third place, and in 1973, they were relegated to the Austrian Oberliga. In the 2014–15 season, the club joined the Inter-National League. After the dissolution of the competition, the club joined the Alps Hockey League for the 2016–17 season.

== Season-by-season record ==
Season	League	GP	W	T	L	GF–GA	Pts	Rank	Playoffs
1965-66	ÖEHL	12	2	0	10	28:56	4	4	None
1966-67	ÖEHL	16	6	2	8	63:77	14	3	None
1967-68	ÖEHL	10	4	3	3	38:31	11	3	None
1968-69	ÖEHL	12	4	0	8	39:66	8	6	Playouts
1969-70	ÖEHL	14	6	2	6	56:48	14	5	Playouts
1970-71	ÖEHL	28	12	1	15	129:137	25	5	None
1971-72	ÖEHL	28	9	3	16	83:109	21	7	None
1972-73	ÖEHL	28	3	1	24	74:217	7	8	Relegated to Oberliga

== Achievements ==
- ASKÖ-Staatsliga champion: 1949, 1952, 1954
- Austrian Oberliga champion: 1976, 1996, 2004, 2005
- Tiroler Landesmeister: 1988, 2007

== Sources ==
- Official website (in German)
- EC Kitzbuhel profile on eliteprospects.com
