= VEU Feldkirch =

Austrian professional ice hockey team

- City: Feldkirch, Austria
- League: Ö Eishockey Liga
- Founded: 1945; 81 years ago
- Home arena: Vorarlberghalle (capacity: 5,200)
- Colours
- Website: http://www.veu-feldkirch.at/

VEU Feldkirch is a professional ice hockey team from Feldkirch, Austria. The team currently plays in the Ö Eishockey Liga. They play their home games at Vorarlberghalle. They formerly played in the Austrian National League and Alps Hockey League, and were nine-time Austrian ice hockey champions when they played in the higher level Austrian Hockey League, before being relegated. Their biggest success was the win of the European Hockey League in 1998 with its coach Ralph Krueger.
