= Wiener EV =

Austrian ice sports club

Wiener Eislaufverein
- Full name: Wiener Eislaufverein
- Short name: Wiener EV, WEV
- Founded: 1867
- Based in: Vienna, Austria
- Location: Lothringerstraße 22
- Colors: Black, yellow
- Website: wev.or.at

Wiener Eislaufverein (Wiener EV, WEV; Vienna Ice Skating Club) is an ice-sports club located in Vienna, Austria. They were founded in 1867 and the club's greatest successes have been in ice hockey, figure skating, and speed skating.

Historian James R. Hines states that figure skating has a long tradition in Vienna and that the Wiener AV is one of the world's oldest and most active skating clubs. Hines also states that American skater Jackson Haines, who influenced the early history of the sport and who helped develop the Viennese style of figure skating, was instrumental in the founding of the club.

The club also operates one of the largest open-air ice rinks in the world on the Heumarkt in Vienna, with over 6,000 m^{2} of ice surface.

The men's representative ice hockey team was established in 1914 and won fourteen Austrian Championship titles. Their home arena was Albert Schultz Halle. The Wiener EV ice hockey program was succeeded by the Wiener Eislöwen-Verein. The club's ice hockey junior teams played their last season under the Wiener EV name in 1999–2000.

== Achievements ==
- Austrian Ice Hockey Champion (13) : 1923, 1924, 1926, 1927, 1928, 1929, 1930, 1931, 1933, 1937, 1947, 1948, 1962
- Austrian ice hockey runner-up (6) : 1972, 1980, 1981, 1987, 1988
