= Innsbrucker EV =

Austrian ice hockey team

EV Innsbruck
- City: Innsbruck, Austria
- League: Austrian Hockey League –1993; Austrian National League; 1993–1994
- Founded: 1925
- Folded: 1994
- Home arena: Olympiahalle Innsbruck

Franchise history
- 1925–1960s: Innsbrucker Eislaufverein
- 1960s–1973: EV Innsbruck
- 1973–1975: EC Innsbruck
- 1975–1984: EC Sparkasse (ECS) Innsbruck
- 1984–1988: EV Innsbruck
- 1988–1989: Gösser EV (GEV) Innsbruck
- 1989–1994: EV Innsbruck

Championships
- Playoff championships: Austrian Champion (7); 1953, 1954, 1958, 1959, 1961, 1963, 1989; Austrian National League Champion (1); 1994

Innsbrucker EV or EV Innsbruck was an ice hockey team based in Innsbruck, Austria. They competed in the Austrian Hockey League until 1993 and won the Austrian Championship seven times. Their home arena was Olympiahalle Innsbruck.

The organization was disbanded entirely after the 1993–94 season. HC Innsbruck was founded in 1994 and, through not a continuation of the original franchise, is regarded as EV Innsbruck's successor.

== Notable alumni ==
Years active with EV Innsbruck listed alongside names

- (Canada) Alain Daigle, 1981–82
- (Canada) Chris Felix, 1991–1993
- (Canada) François Guay, 1991–1993
- (Canada) / (Austria) Greg Holst, 1989–1992
- (Russia) Sergei Alekseevich Kapustin, 1986–1987
- (Canada) Kevin LaVallée, 1987–1990
- (Austria) Martin Lindner, 1982–1994
- (Austria) Martin Platzer, 1983–1985
- (Denmark) / (Canada) Poul Popiel, 1978–79
- (Austria) Gerald Rauchenwald, 1986–1991
- (Canada) / (Austria) Adelbert Saint John, 1975–1978 (player-coach)
- (Russia) Viktor Ivanovich Shalimov, 1987–88
- (Austria) Christian Perthaler, 1988–1993

== Head coaches ==
- (Canada) / (Austria) Adelbert Saint John, 1975–1978 (player-coach)
- (Germany) Gerhard Kießling, 1985
- (Canada) Blair MacDonald, 1986–87
- (Switzerland) Rudolf Killias, 1987–1989
- (Germany) Gerhard Kießling, 1990–91
- (Czech Republic) Václav Nedomanský, 1990–91
- (Czech Republic) Miroslav Berek, 1991–1993
