= List of New York Islanders players =

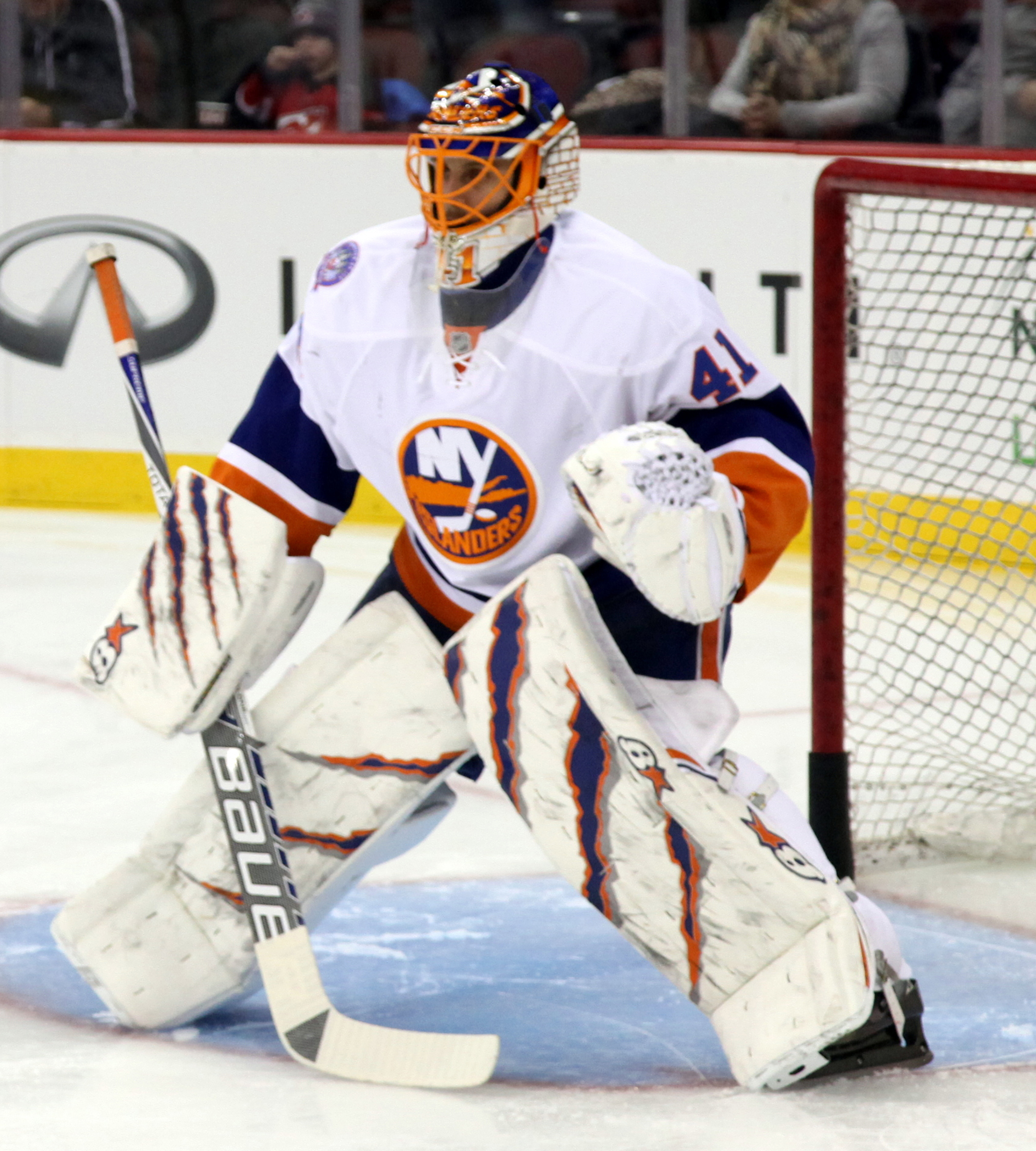
Jaroslav Halak, former goaltender for the New York Islanders

The New York Islanders are a professional ice hockey team based in Elmont, New York. They are members of the Metropolitan Division of the National Hockey League's (NHL) Eastern Conference. The Islanders franchise has been a part of the NHL since their inception in 1972, playing their home games at Nassau Veterans Memorial Coliseum 1972–2015, 2018–21, Barclays Center 2015–20, and at UBS Arena 2021–present. Over 500 players have played for the team for at least one regular season or playoff game, and nearly 20 have had multiple stints over the years.

The Islanders have won the Stanley Cup four consecutive times (1980, 1981, 1982, and 1983), with a total of 32 players playing for the team throughout those four wins. Sixteen players (Mike Bossy, Bob Bourne, Clark Gillies, Butch Goring, Anders Kallur, Gord Lane, Dave Langevin, Wayne Merrick, Ken Morrow, Bob Nystrom, Stefan Persson, Denis Potvin, Billy Smith, Duane Sutter, John Tonelli and Bryan Trottier) have been a part of all four Cup wins, and three more (Billy Carroll, Mike McEwen and Roland Melanson) have won three with the team. The Islanders have retired seven numbers: 5 (Denis Potvin), 9 (Clark Gillies), 19 (Bryan Trottier), 22 (Mike Bossy), 23 (Bob Nystrom), 31 (Billy Smith) and 91 (Butch Goring).

Fifteen players have captained the team, beginning with Ed Westfall. Denis Potvin holds the record for the longest captaincy period, as he led the team from 1979 to 1987. The shortest captaincy period was held by Bryan McCabe, who only served for 56 regular season games. There have been two seasons where the Islanders did not have a captain: 1996–97 and 2000–01. The team's current captain is Anders Lee, who was appointed on October 4, 2018, succeeding John Tavares, who signed with the Toronto Maple Leafs in the 2018–19 offseason.

== Key ==
† Won a Stanley Cup with the Islanders

Abbreviations
GP	Games played

Goaltenders
W	Wins
SO	Shutouts
L	Losses
GAA	Goals against average
T	Ties
SV%^{A}	Save percentage
OTL	Overtime loss

Skaters
Pos	Position	RW	Right wing	A	Assists
D	Defenseman	C	Center	P	Points
LW	Left wing	G	Goals	PIM	Penalty minutes

== Goaltenders ==
In the Islanders' inaugural season, three goaltenders played for the team: Billy Smith, Gerry Desjardins and Gerry Gray. Since then, 51 others have played in at least one regular season or playoff game. Smith stayed with the Islanders through 1989 and played in 674 regular season games and 132 playoff games, the most in the team's history. Additionally, he holds the records for most overall wins, with 304. Chico Resch has recorded the most shutouts with 25. Twenty-one have played in Islanders playoff games and of those, three have been on the roster during a Stanley Cup victory.

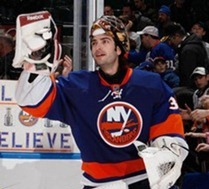
Al Montoya played two seasons with the Islanders, from 2010 to 2012.

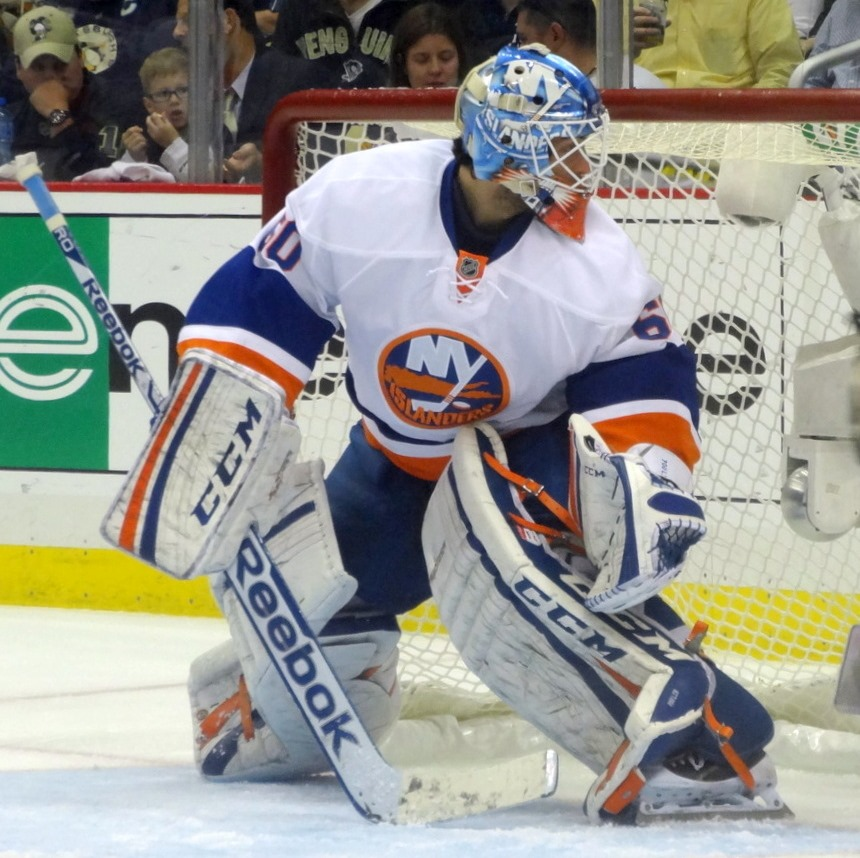
Kevin Poulin was drafted by the Islanders in 2008 and remained in the organization until 2015.

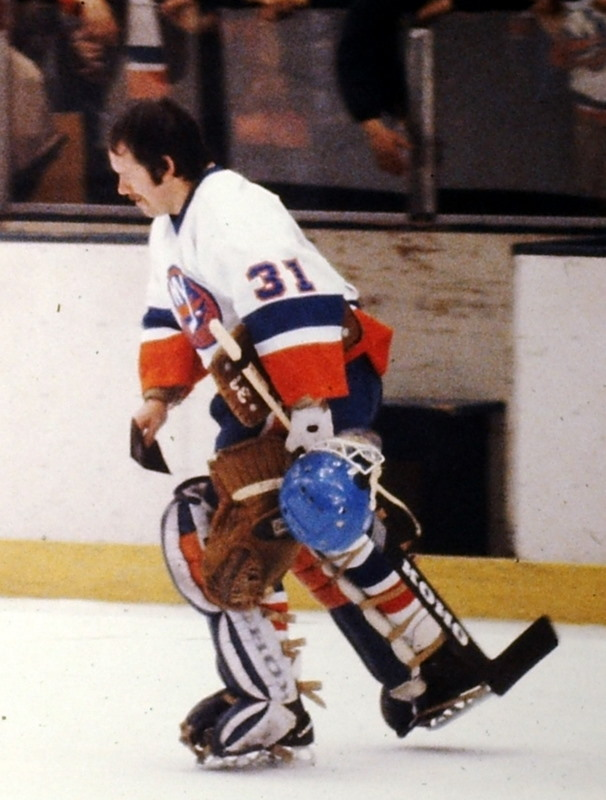
Billy Smith has played the most games of any goalie for the Islanders and was in the net for all four of the team's Stanley Cup victories.

New York Islanders goaltenders
Goalie	Nationality	Seasons^{B}	Regular season^{C}								Playoffs^{C}					
Goalie	Nationality	Seasons^{B}	GP	W	L	T	OTL	SO	GAA	SV%	GP	W	L	SO	GAA	SV%
Ken Appleby	Canada	2023–2024	1	0	0	0	—	0	6.00	.750	—	—	—	—	—	—
Jean-Francois Berube	Canada	2015–2017	21	6	4	—	1	0	3.11	.900	1	0	0	0	0.00	1.000
Martin Biron	Canada	2009–2010	29	9	14	—	4	1	3.27	.896	—	—	—	—	—	—
Richard Brodeur	Canada	1979–1980	2	1	0	0	—	0	4.50	—	—	—	—	—	—	—
Marcel Cousineau	Canada	1998–1999	6	0	4	0	—	0	2.87	.882	—	—	—	—	—	—
Yann Danis	Canada	2008–2009	31	10	17	—	3	2	2.86	.910	—	—	—	—	—	—
Gerry Desjardins	Canada	1972–1974	80	14	52	9	—	0	3.90	—	—	—	—	—	—	—
Rick DiPietro	United States	2000–2013	318	130	136	8	28	16	2.87	.902	10	2	7	1	2.60	.904
Tom Draper	Canada	1993–1994	7	1	3	0	—	0	4.23	.864	—	—	—	—	—	—
Wade Dubielewicz	Canada	2003–2008	37	16	13	1	1	0	2.34	.922	1	0	1	0	4.07	.886
Mike Dunham	United States	2006–2007	19	4	10	—	3	0	3.74	.889	—	—	—	—	—	—
Eric Fichaud	Canada	1995–1998	75	17	34	9	—	2	3.12	.900	—	—	—	—	—	—
Mark Fitzpatrick	Canada	1988–1993	129	51	53	17	—	3	3.39	.889	7	0	3	0	4.12	.821
Wade Flaherty	Canada	1997–2001	60	15	26	6	—	4	2.65	.903	—	—	—	—	—	—
Gerry Gray	Canada	1972–1973	1	0	1	0	—	0	5.00	—	—	—	—	—	—	—
Christopher Gibson	Finland	2015–2020	14	3	4	—	3	0	3.45	.904	—	—	—	—	—	—
Thomas Greiss	Germany	2015–2020	162	85	51	—	13	10	2.69	.916	12	5	6	0	2.49	.920
Jeff Hackett	Canada	1988–1989; 1990–1991	43	9	25	1	—	0	3.58	.879	—	—	—	—	—	—
Jaroslav Halak	Slovakia	2014–2018	177	88	65	—	19	12	2.69	.913	12	5	6	0	2.49	.920
Glenn Healy	Canada	1989–1993	176	66	79	21	—	4	3.47	.889	22	10	10	0	3.22	.887
Ron Hextall	Canada	1993–1994	65	27	26	6	—	5	3.08	.898	3	0	3	0	6.09	.800
Marcus Högberg	Sweden	2024–2026	16	2	6	—	3	0	3.48	.874	—	—	—	—	—	—
Goran Hogosta	Sweden	1977–1978	1	0	0	0	—	0	0.00	—	—	—	—	—	—	—
Kelly Hrudey	Canada	1983–1989	241	106	90	26	—	6	3.42	.891	27	10	16	0	2.76	.903
Chad Johnson	Canada	2014–2015	19	8	8	—	1	0	3.08	.889	—	—	—	—	—	—
Mikko Koskinen	Finland	2010–2011	4	2	1	—	0	0	4.33	.873	—	—	—	—	—	—
Nathan Lawson	Canada	2010–2011	10	1	4	—	2	0	4.06	.893	—	—	—	—	—	—
Robin Lehner	Sweden	2018–2019	46	25	13	—	5	6	2.13	.930	8	4	4	0	2.00	.936
Tristan Lennox	Canada	2024–2025	1	0	0	—	0	0	12.72	.500	—	—	—	—	—	—
Danny Lorenz	Canada	1990–1993	8	1	5	0	—	0	4.20	.856	—	—	—	—	—	—
Roberto Luongo	Canada	1999–2000	24	7	14	1	—	1	3.25	.904	—	—	—	—	—	—
Joey MacDonald	Canada	2007–2009	51	14	27	—	7	1	3.19	.910	—	—	—	—	—	—
George Maneluk	Canada	1990–1991	4	1	1	0	—	0	6.43	.840	—	—	—	—	—	—
Peter Mannino	United States	2008–2009	3	1	1	—	0	0	4.51	.855	—	—	—	—	—	—
Jamie McLennan	Canada	1993–1997	56	17	27	9	—	0	3.30	.889	2	0	1	0	4.37	.872
Roland Melanson †††	Canada	1980–1985	136	77	34	14	—	1	3.44	.892	17	3	4	0	3.64	.844
Al Montoya	United States	2010–2012	51	18	16	—	10	1	2.75	.907	—	—	—	—	—	—
Evgeni Nabokov	Russia	2011–2014	123	57	43	—	18	9	2.60	.910	6	2	4	0	4.44	.842
Michal Neuvirth	Czech Republic	2014–2015	5	1	3	—	1	0	2.94	.881	—	—	—	—	—	—
Anders Nilsson	Sweden	2011–2014	23	9	9	—	2	1	3.05	.898	—	—	—	—	—	—
Chris Osgood	Canada	2001–2003	103	49	39	10	—	6	2.71	.902	7	3	4	0	2.60	.912
Felix Potvin	Canada	1998–2000	33	7	21	4	—	1	3.45	.893	—	—	—	—	—	—
Kevin Poulin	Canada	2010–2015	50	18	25	—	3	0	3.07	.899	2	0	0	0	1.15	.993
Chico Resch †	Canada	1973–1981	282	157	69	47	—	25	2.62	—	38	17	17	0	2.72	—
David Rittich	Czech Republic	2025–2026	30	14	10	—	3	2	2.76	.894	—	—	—	—	—	—
Dwayne Roloson	Canada	2009–2011	70	29	31	—	8	1	2.82	.912	—	—	—	—	—	—
Tommy Salo	Sweden	1994–1999	187	62	94	21	—	14	3.02	.896	—	—	—	—	—	—
Cory Schneider	United States	2021–2022	1	1	0	—	0	0	3.00	.900	—	—	—	—	—	—
Jakub Skarek	Czech Republic	2024–2025	2	0	1	—	0	0	3.94	.872	—	—	—	—	—	—
Billy Smith ††††	Canada	1972–1989	675	304	230	104	—	22	3.23	.882	132	88	36	5	2.65	.910
Garth Snow	United States	2001–2006	127	44	53	12	1	4	2.89	.901	6	1	4	1	3.54	.903
Tommy Soderstrom	Sweden	1994–1997	78	19	34	9	—	3	3.49	.890	—	—	—	—	—	—
Ilya Sorokin	Russia	2020–2026	308	154	113	—	38	29	2.60	.914	14	6	6	0	2.83	.919
Chris Terreri	United States	2000–2001	8	2	4	1	—	0	2.44	.912	—	—	—	—	—	—
Steve Valiquette	Canada	1999–2001; 2002–2003	6	2	0	0	—	0	1.89	.949	—	—	—	—	—	—
John Vanbiesbrouck	United States	2000–2001	44	10	25	5	—	1	3.04	.898	—	—	—	—	—	—
Semyon Varlamov	Russia	2019–2025	173	76	63	—	21	16	2.57	.916	39	19	17	2	2.35	.921
Kevin Weekes	Canada	1999–2000	36	10	20	4	—	1	3.41	.902	—	—	—	—	—	—
Steve Weeks	Canada	1991–1992	23	9	4	2	—	0	3.61	.890	—	—	—	—	—	—

== Skaters ==
In the 50 NHL seasons between 1972 and 2023, 532 skaters have played for the Islanders. Bryan Trottier has played the most games (1,123) and also holds the record for most assists (853) and points (1,353). On the other end of the spectrum, 24 players have only played one regular season game. The record for most penalty minutes is held by Mick Vukota with 1,879 minutes while the record for most goals is held by Mike Bossy, who scored 573 goals over a ten-year time period. Bossy is one of 32 players who have been with the team during at least one of their four Stanley Cup victories.

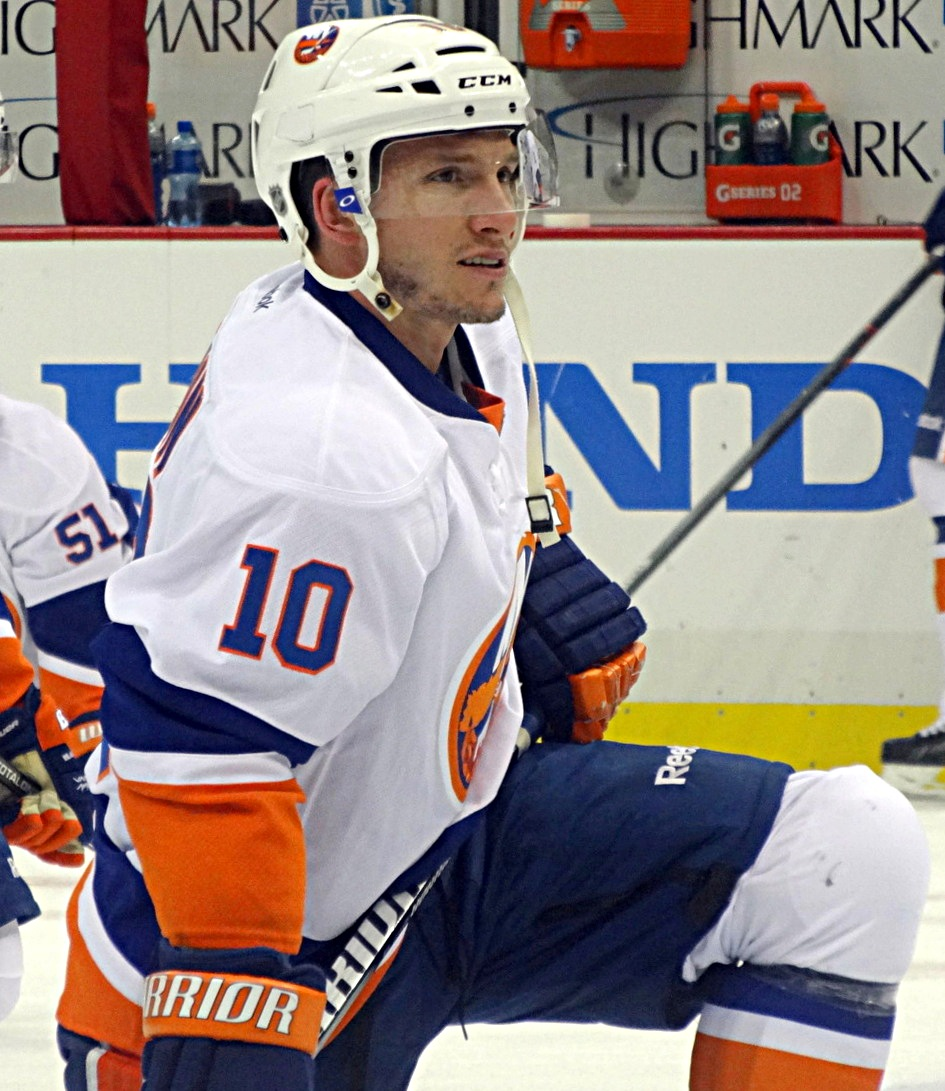
Keith Aucoin played for the Islanders in the 2012–2013 season.

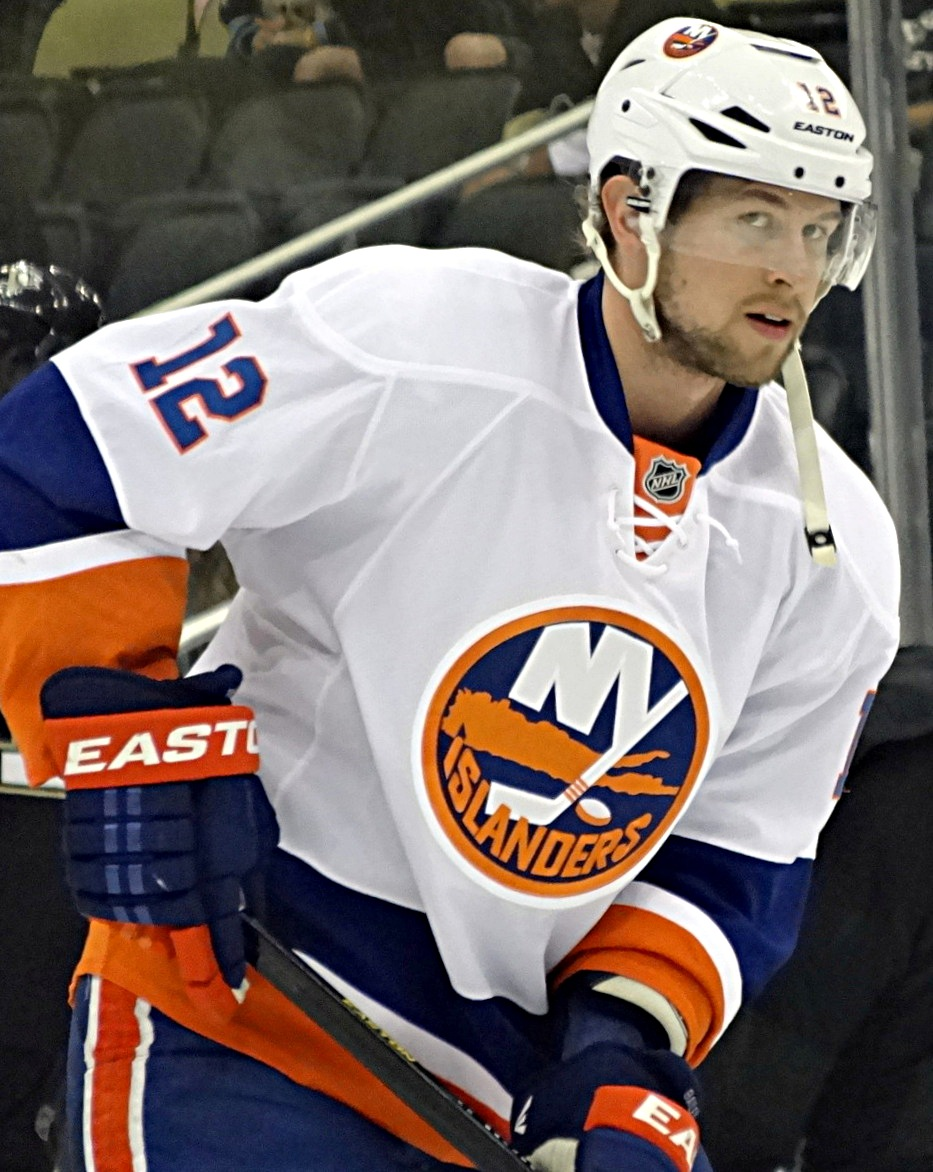
Josh Bailey was selected 9th overall by the Islanders at the 2008 NHL entry draft.

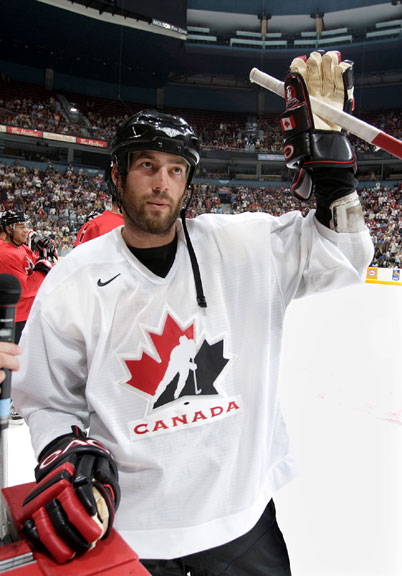
Todd Bertuzzi was with the team for 3 years before spending the majority of his career with the Vancouver Canucks.

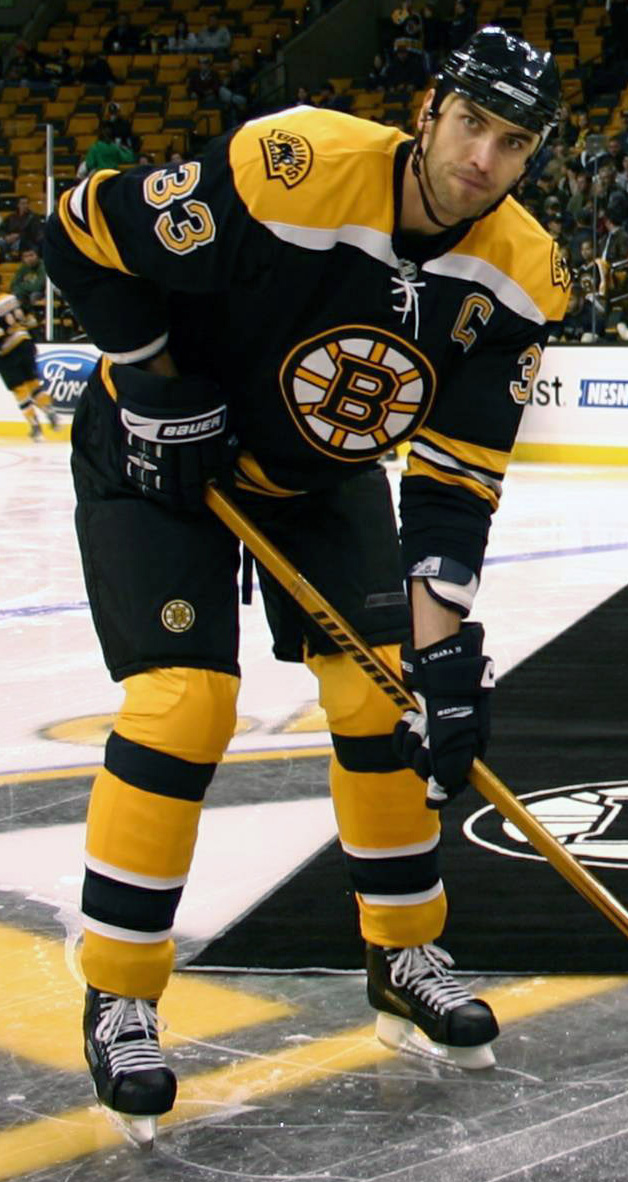
Zdeno Chara was selected 56th overall by the Islanders at the 1996 NHL entry draft.

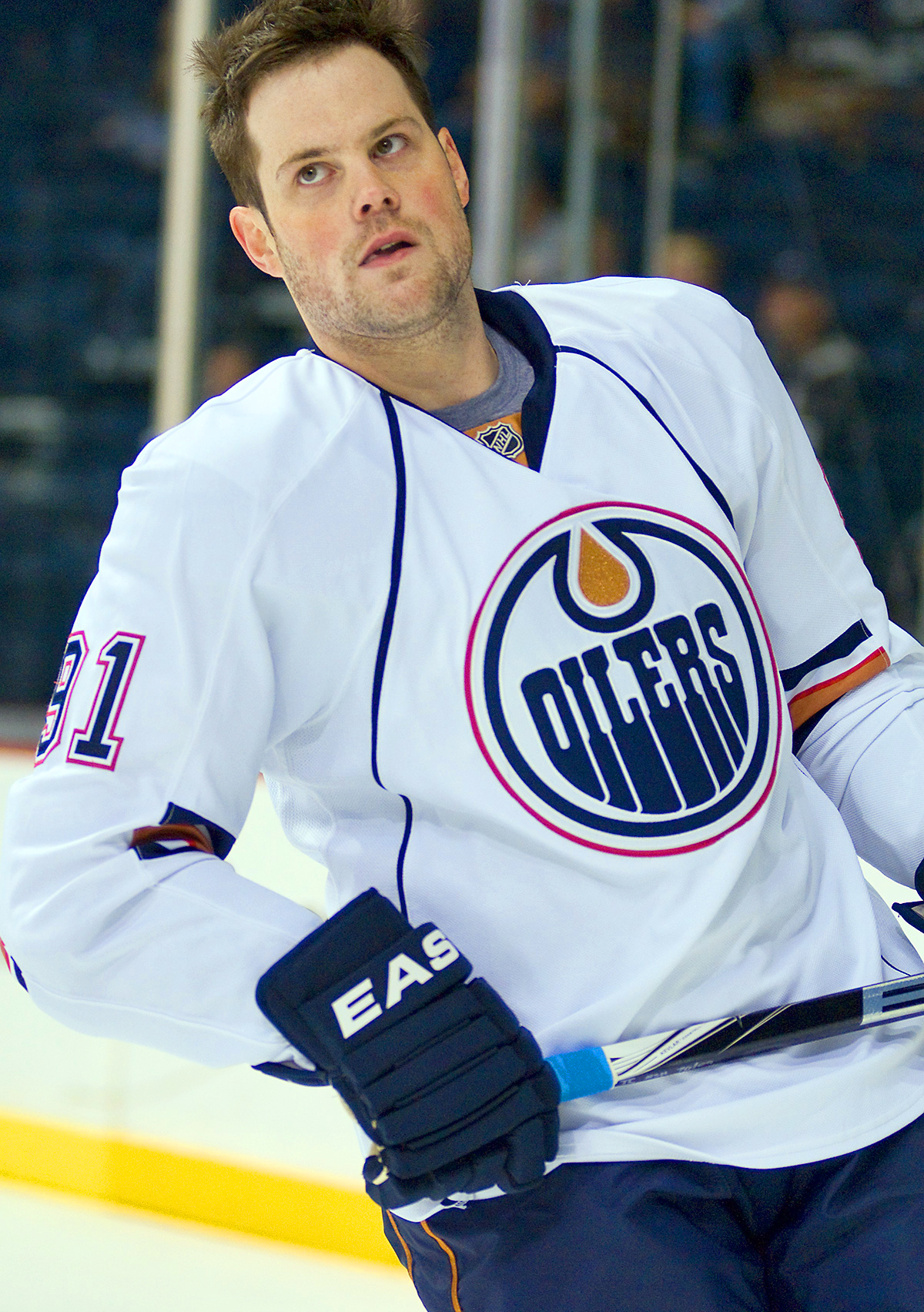
Mike Comrie played with Islanders in two of his final NHL seasons before a hip surgery caused him to retire from hockey.

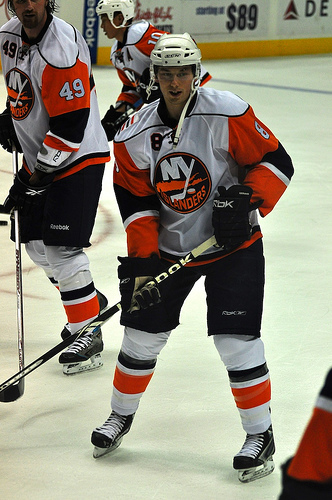
Bruno Gervais spent six seasons with the team, playing in over 330 games.

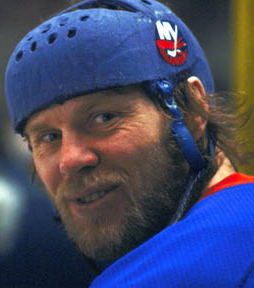
Butch Goring was with the team during all four Stanley Cup victories and now serves as the Islanders' TV color commentator.

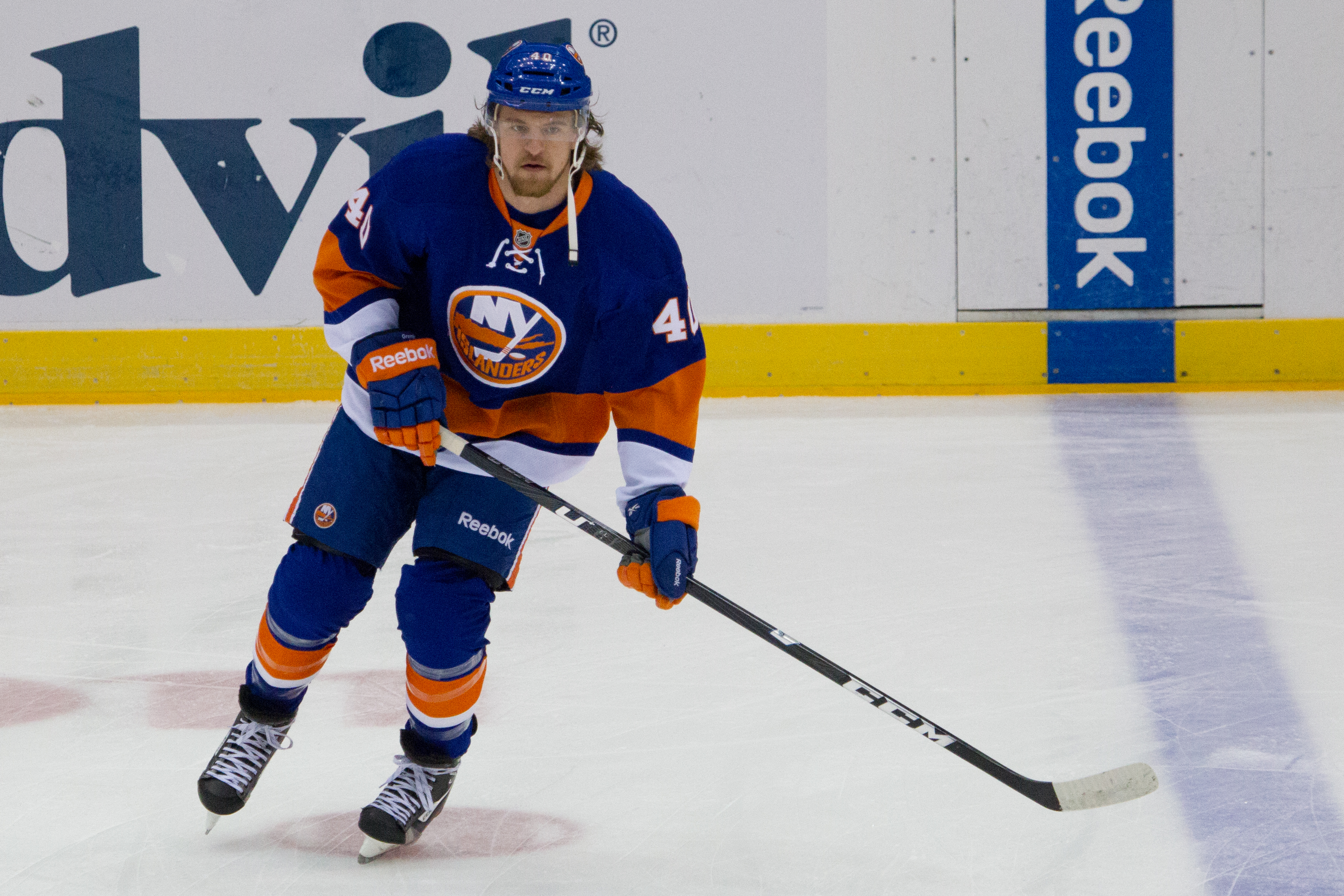
Michael Grabner is one of only four players to play for the Islanders with Austrian heritage.

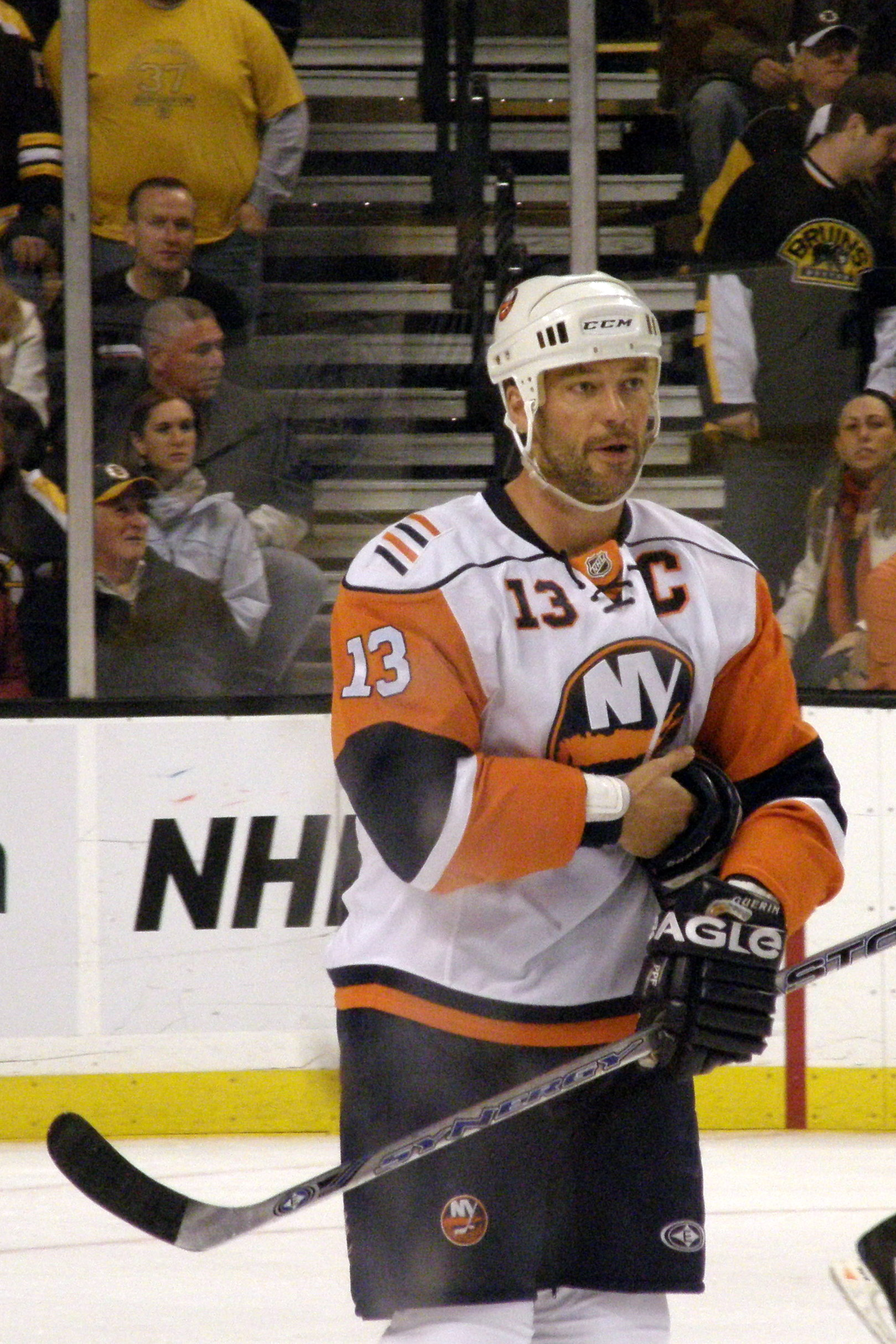
Bill Guerin served as the Islanders' captain from 2007 until he was traded to the Pittsburgh Penguins in 2009.

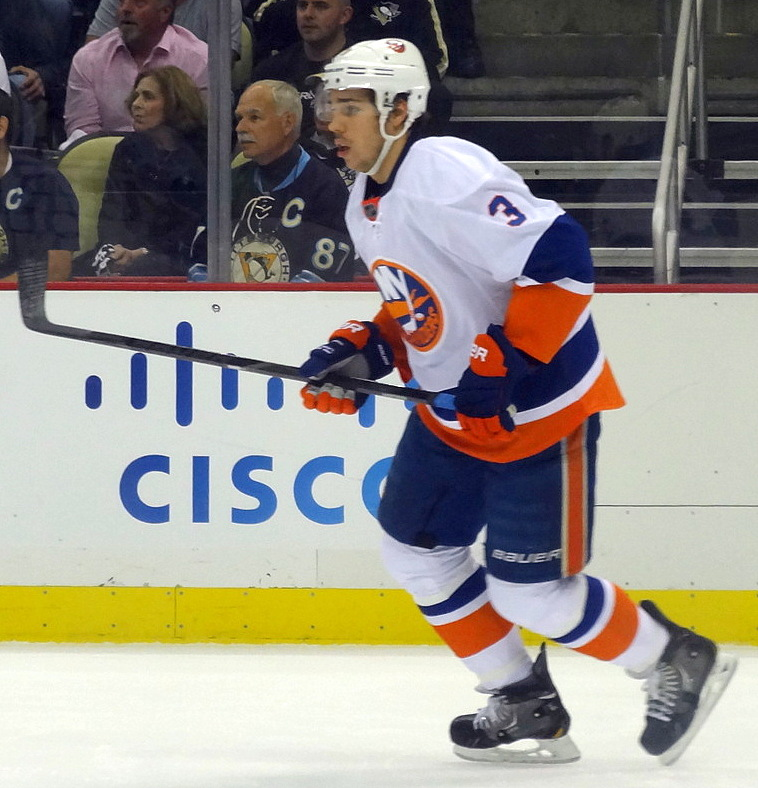
Travis Hamonic is a former Islanders defenseman who played with the team from 2010 until he was traded to the Calgary Flames in 2017.

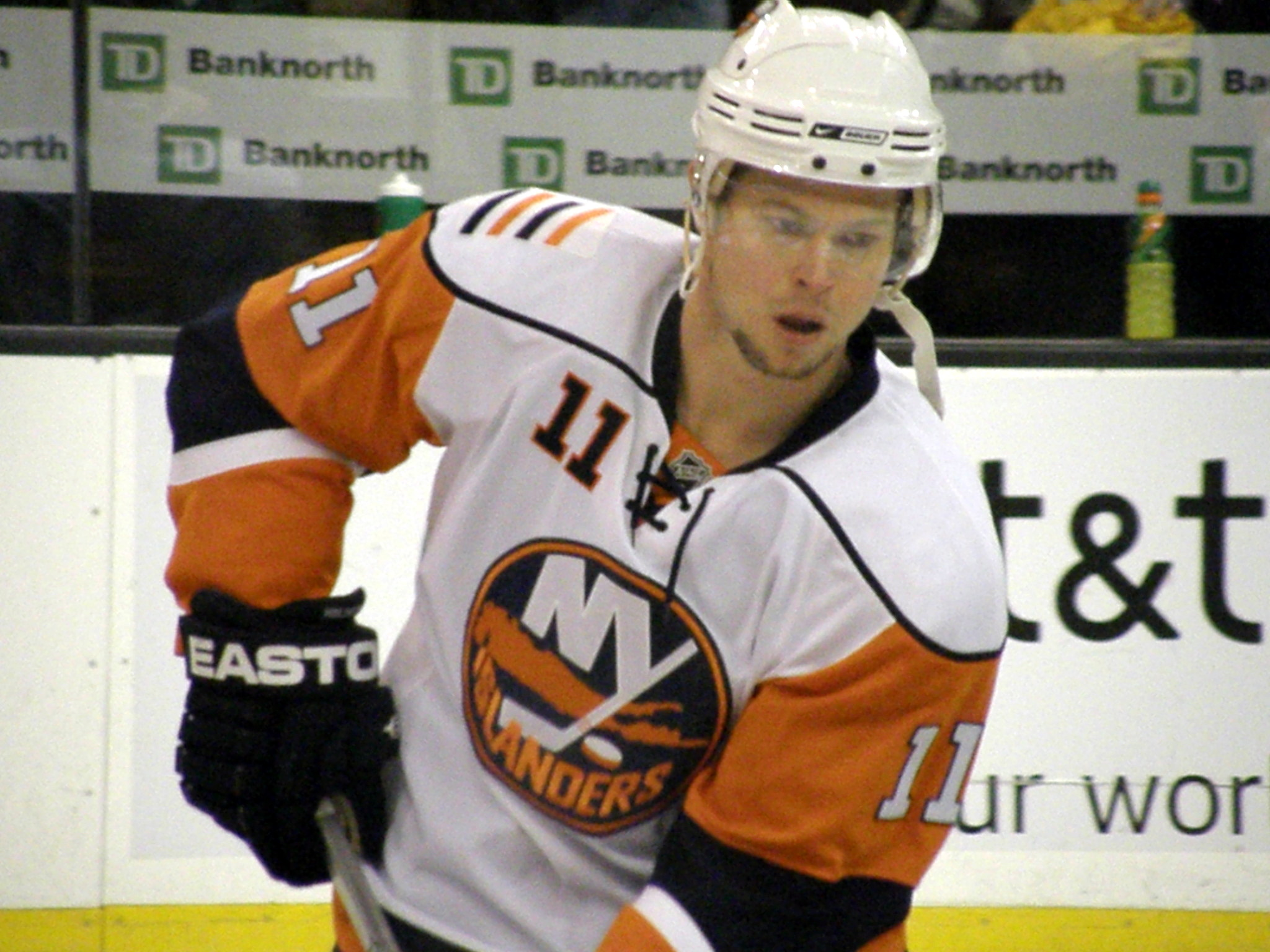
Andy Hilbert spent his last full NHL season with the Islanders in 2008–09 before his retirement in 2010.

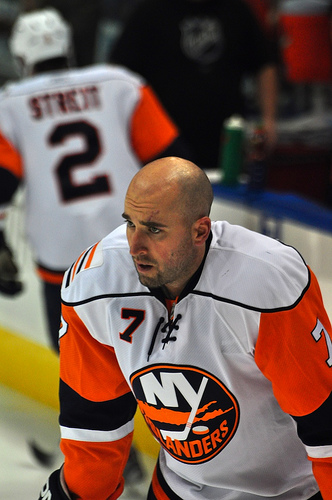
Trent Hunter played nine seasons with the team.

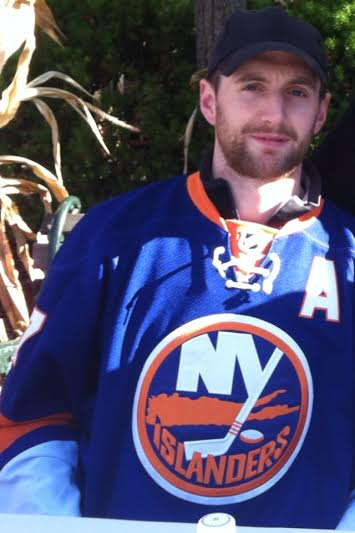
Andrew MacDonald served as an alternate captain during his time with the Islanders.

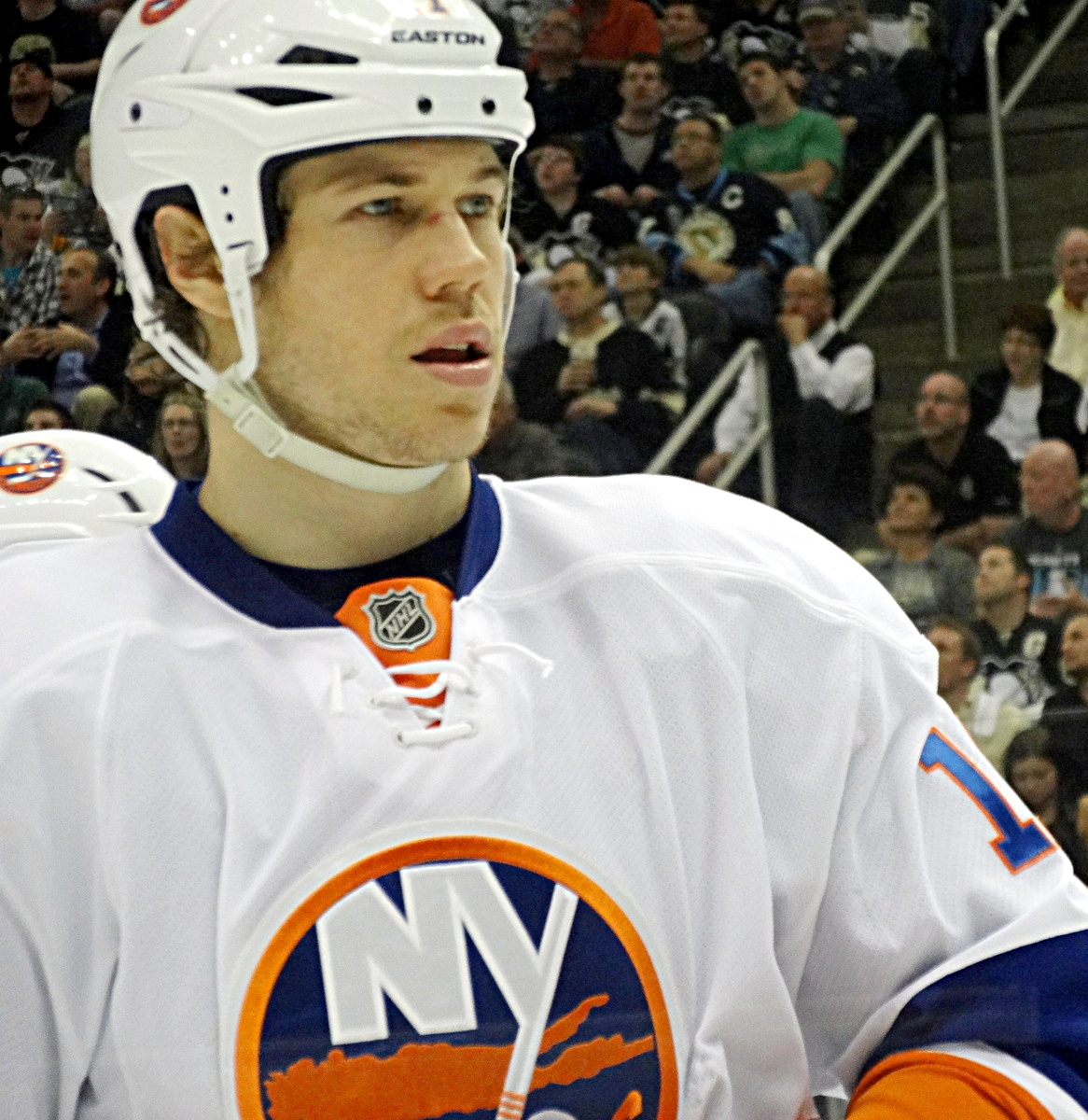
Matt Martin is currently signed to a four-year contract with the team.

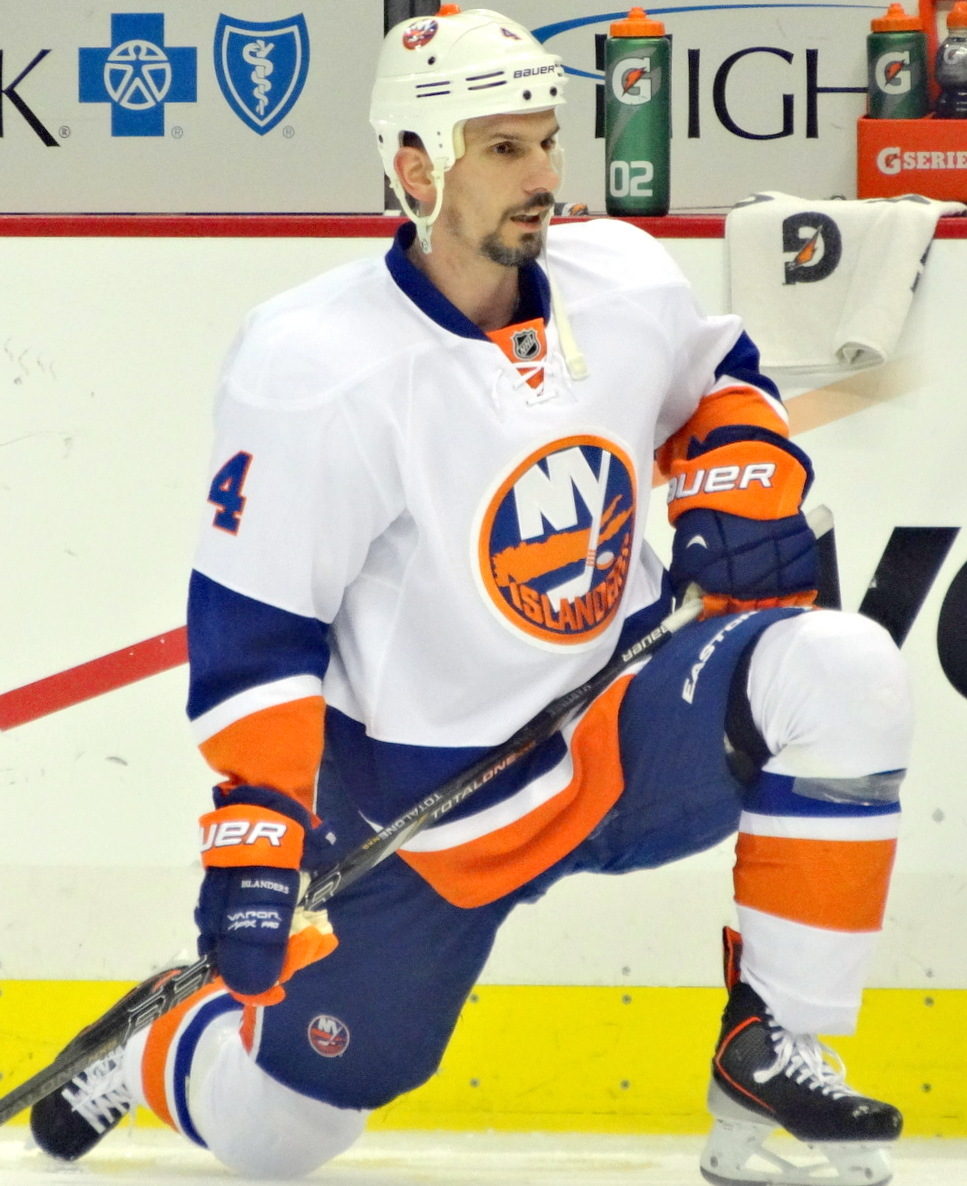
Radek Martinek has played in all but one season from 2001 to 2014 for the Islanders.

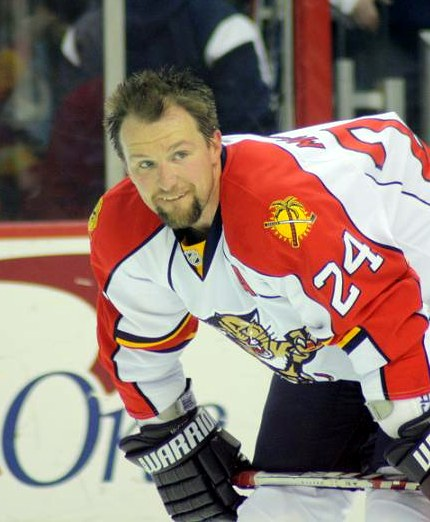
Bryan McCabe was drafted 40th overall by the Islanders in the 1993 NHL entry draft.

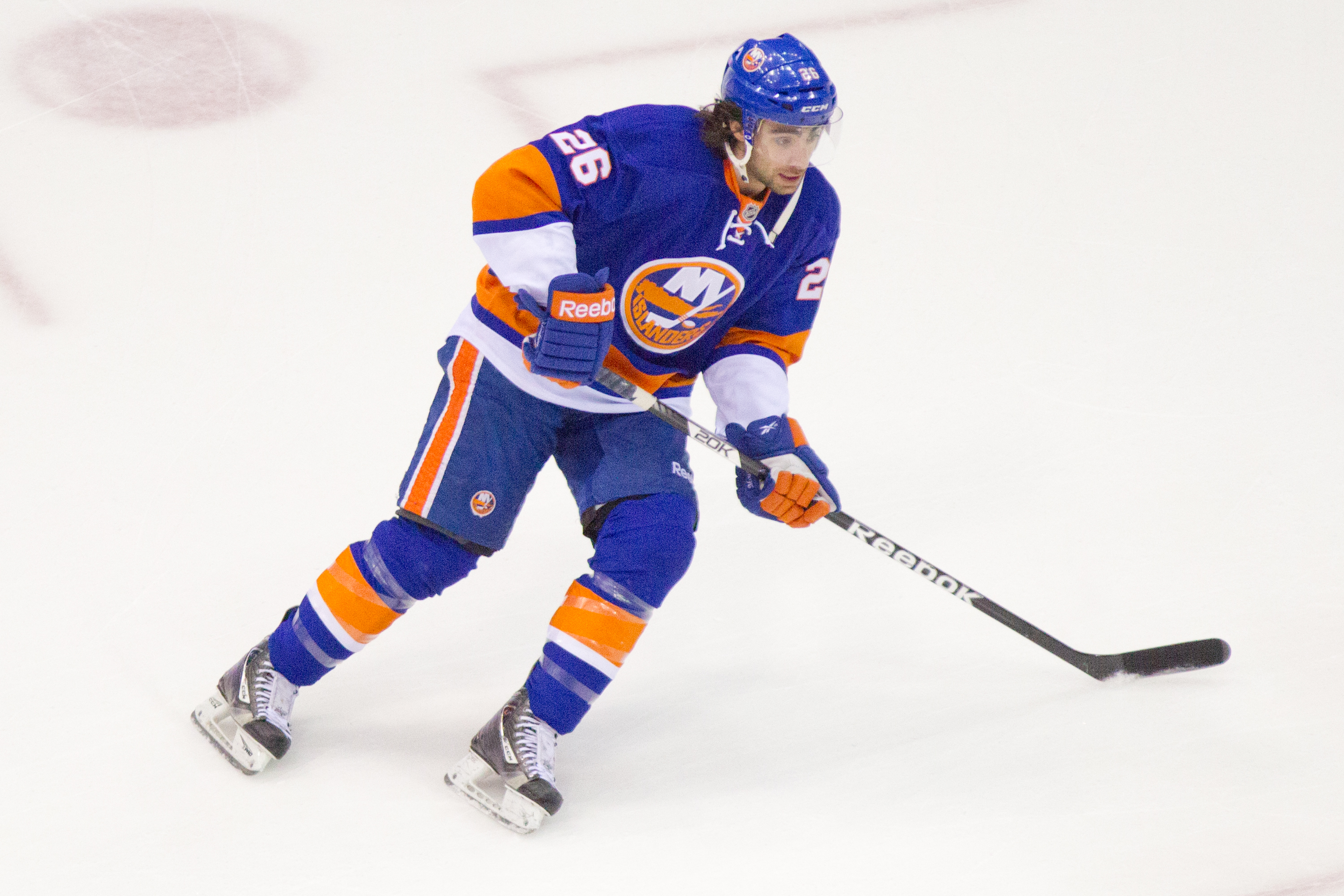
Matt Moulson had three consecutive 30-goal seasons with the Islanders before being traded to the Buffalo Sabres in 2013.

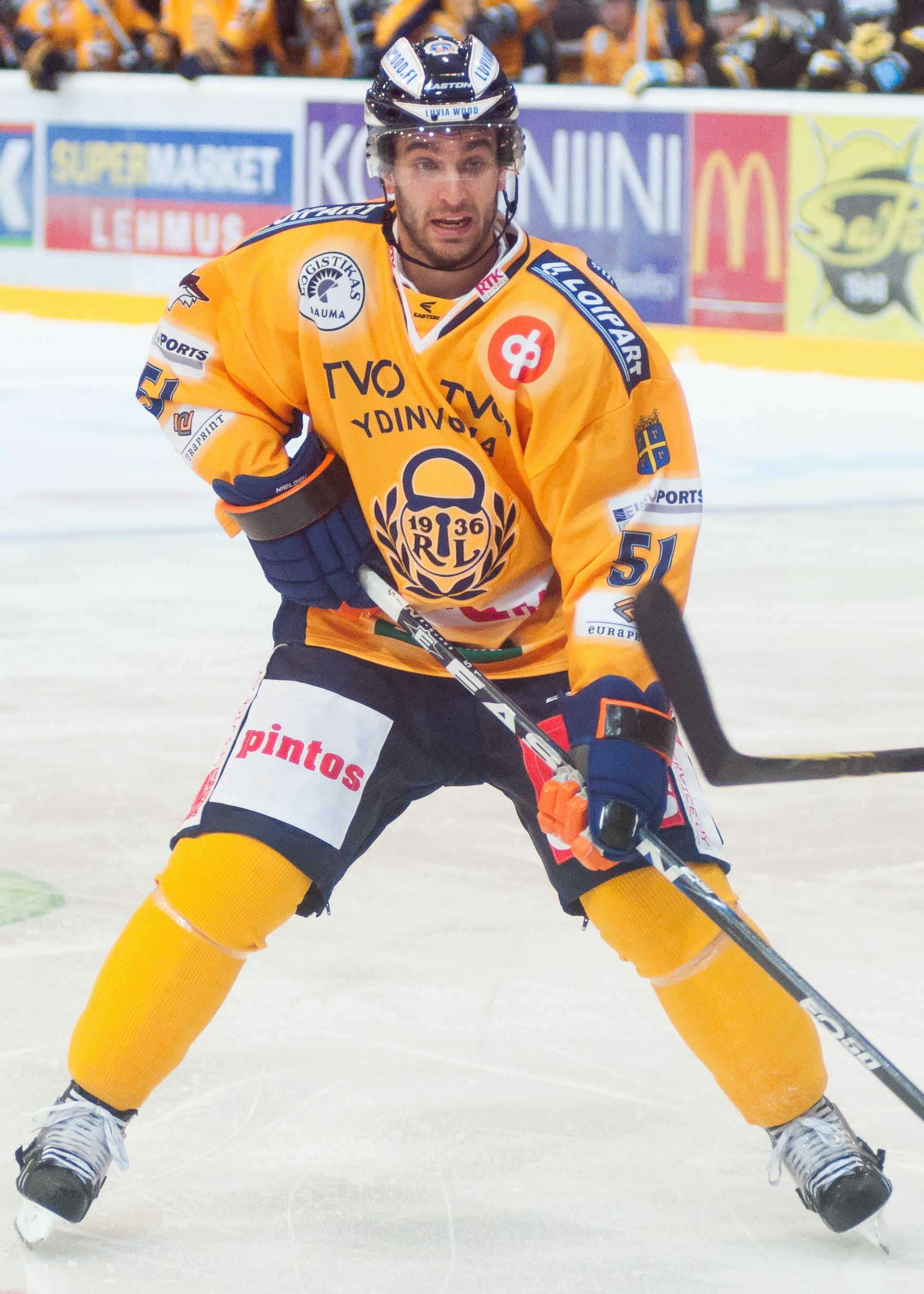
Frans Nielsen is one of two players from Denmark to ever play with the Islanders.

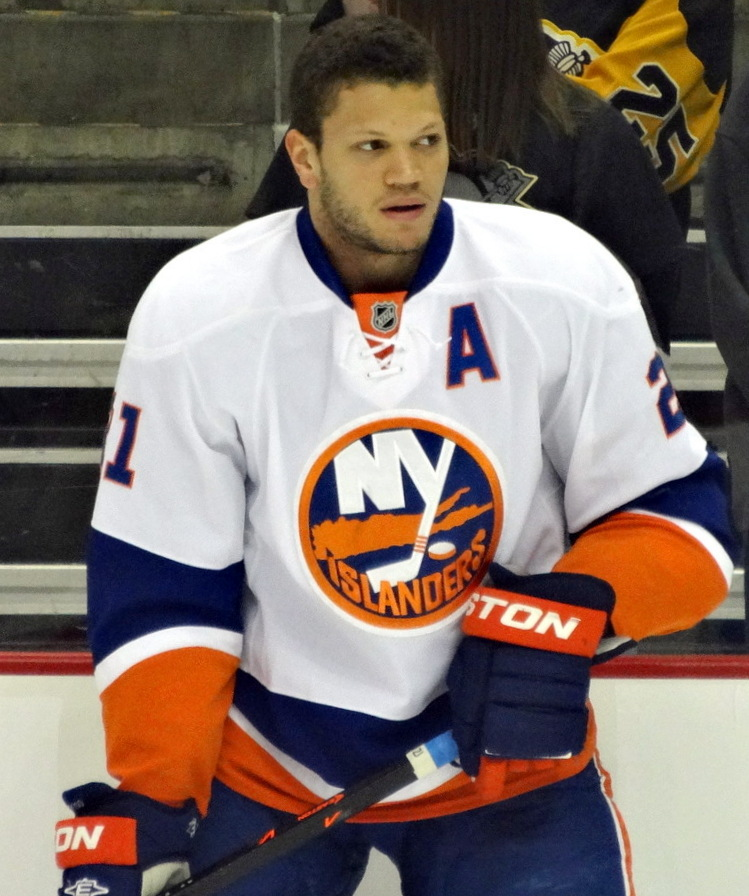
Kyle Okposo was drafted by the Islanders seventh overall in the 2006 draft played with the Islanders until 2016.

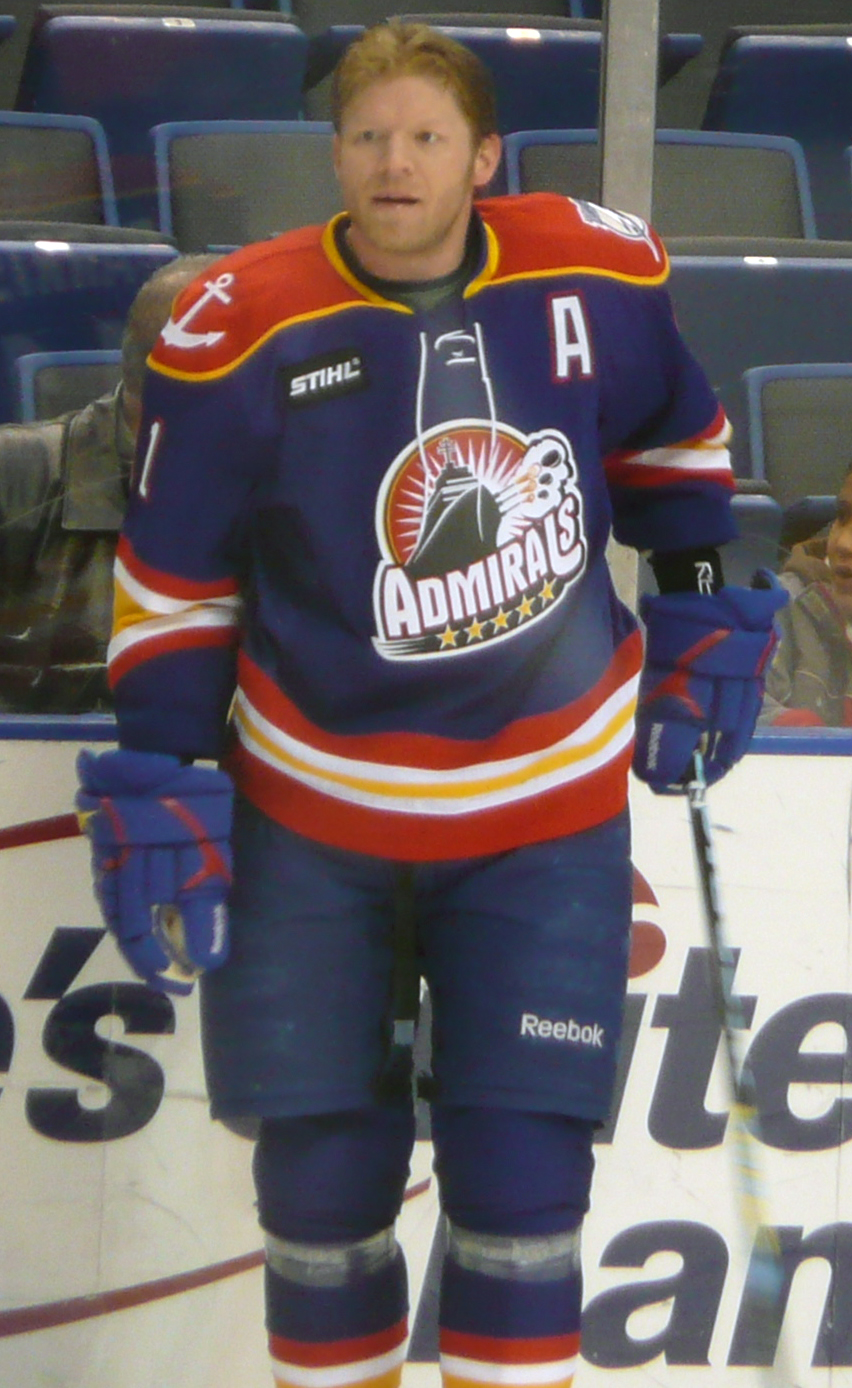
Mark Parrish was initially traded to the Islanders in a deal that sent Roberto Luongo to the Florida Panthers.

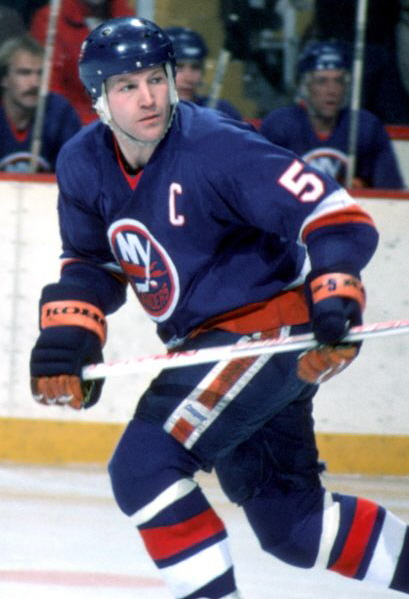
Denis Potvin holds the team record for most career shots, with 3,053.

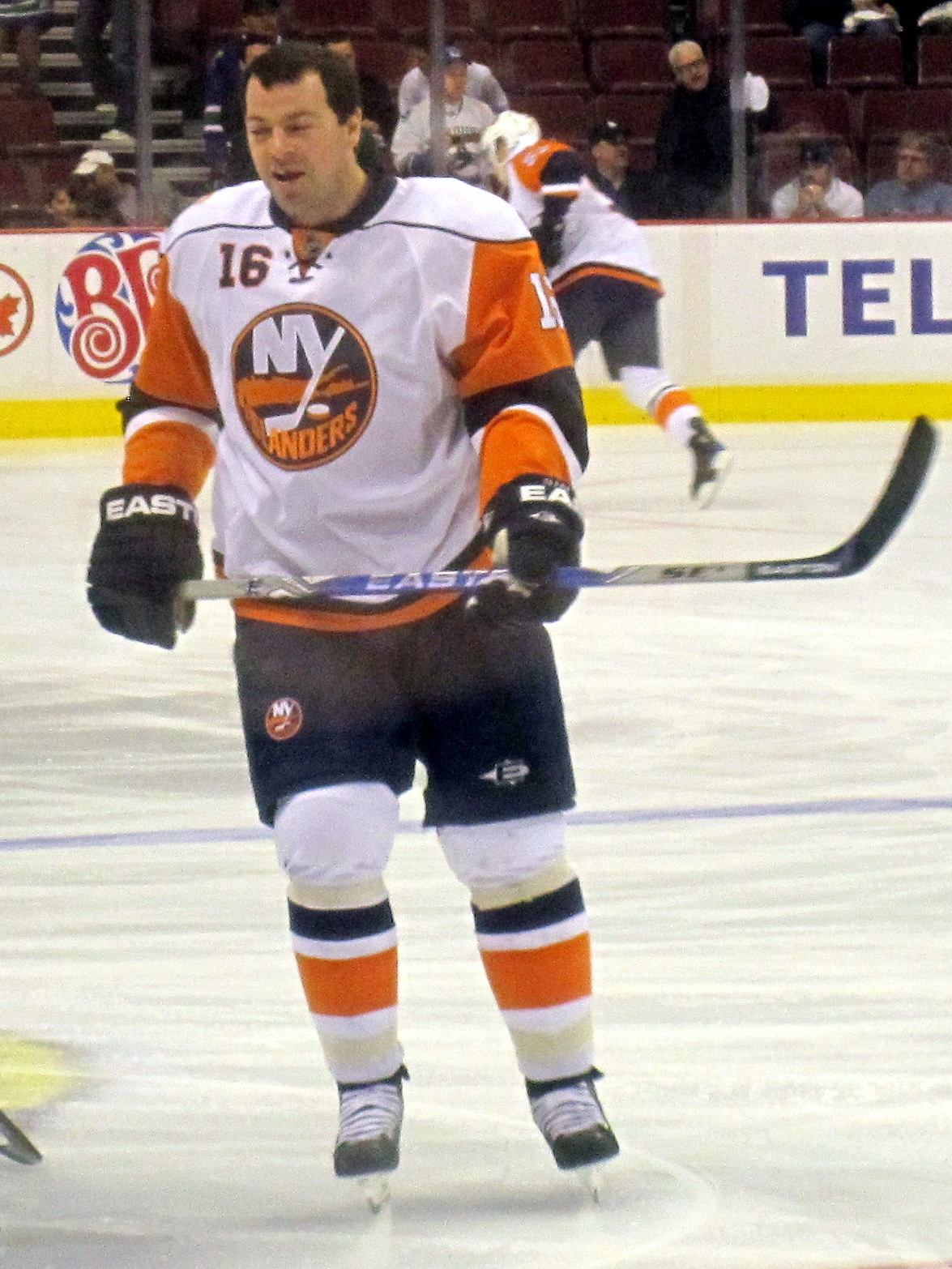
Jon Sim spent his last four NHL seasons with the Islanders from 2007 to 2011.

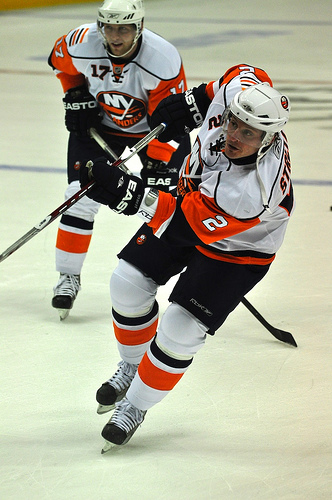
Mark Streit became the NHL's first Swiss-born captain in 2011.

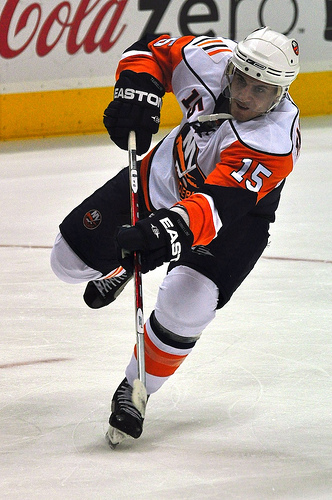
Jeff Tambellini spent his time with the Islanders bouncing back and forth with the team and its minor league affiliate, the Bridgeport Sound Tigers.

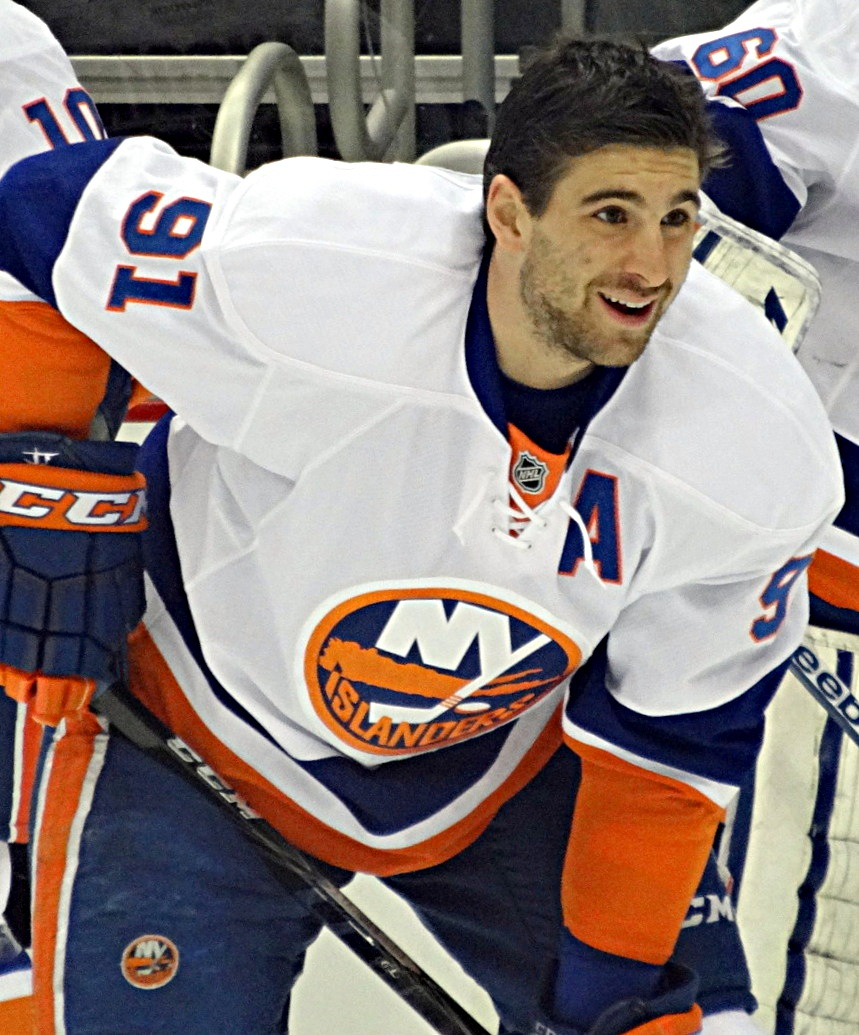
John Tavares was drafted first overall in the 2009 NHL entry draft and played with the team until 2018 when he decided to sign with the Toronto Maple Leafs.

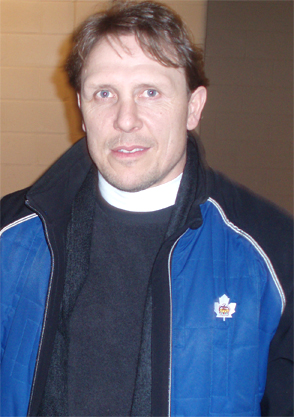
Steve Thomas is the only United Kingdom-born player to ever play for the Islanders.

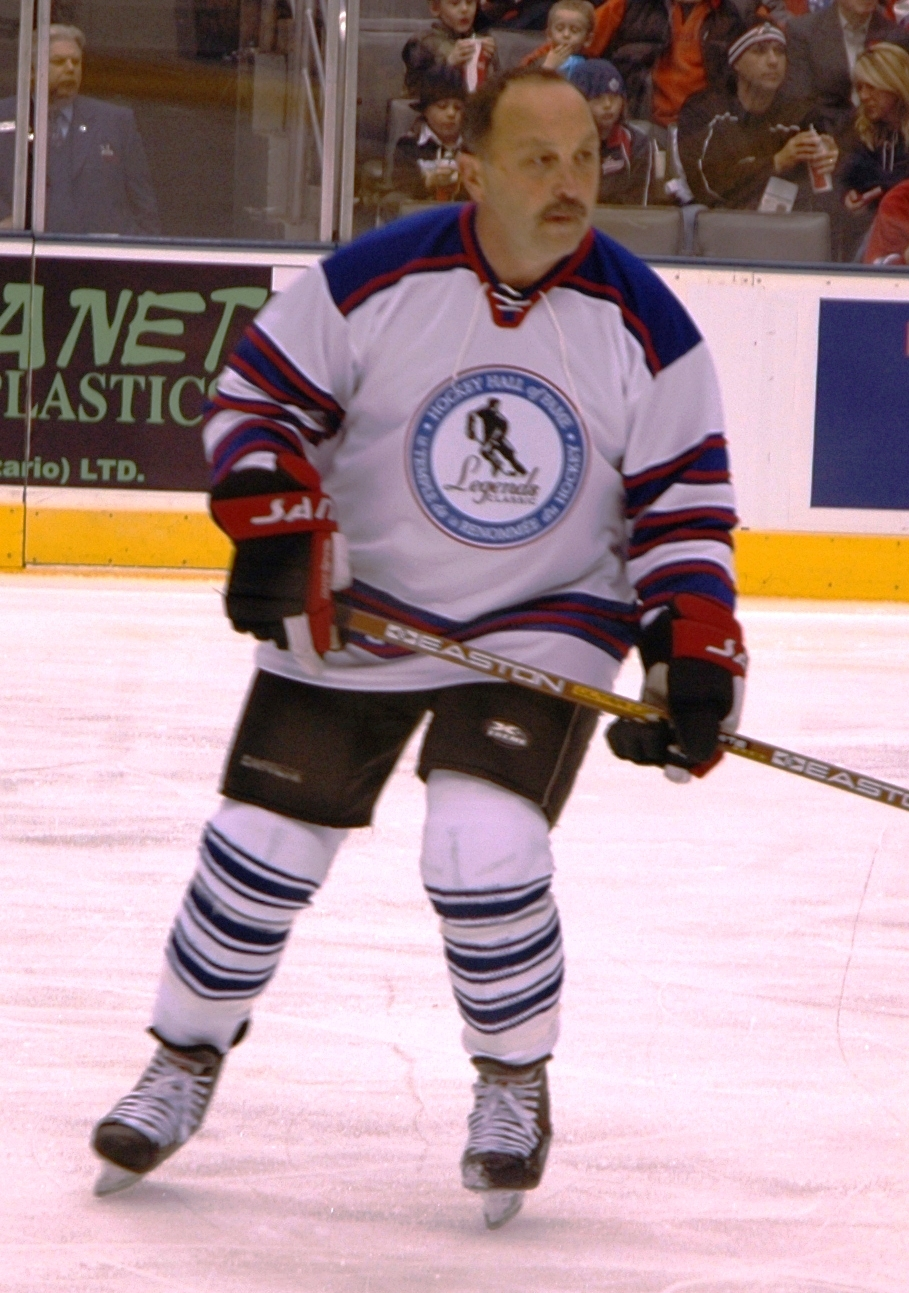
Bryan Trottier holds the Islanders' records for most points (1,353) and most assists (853) with the team.

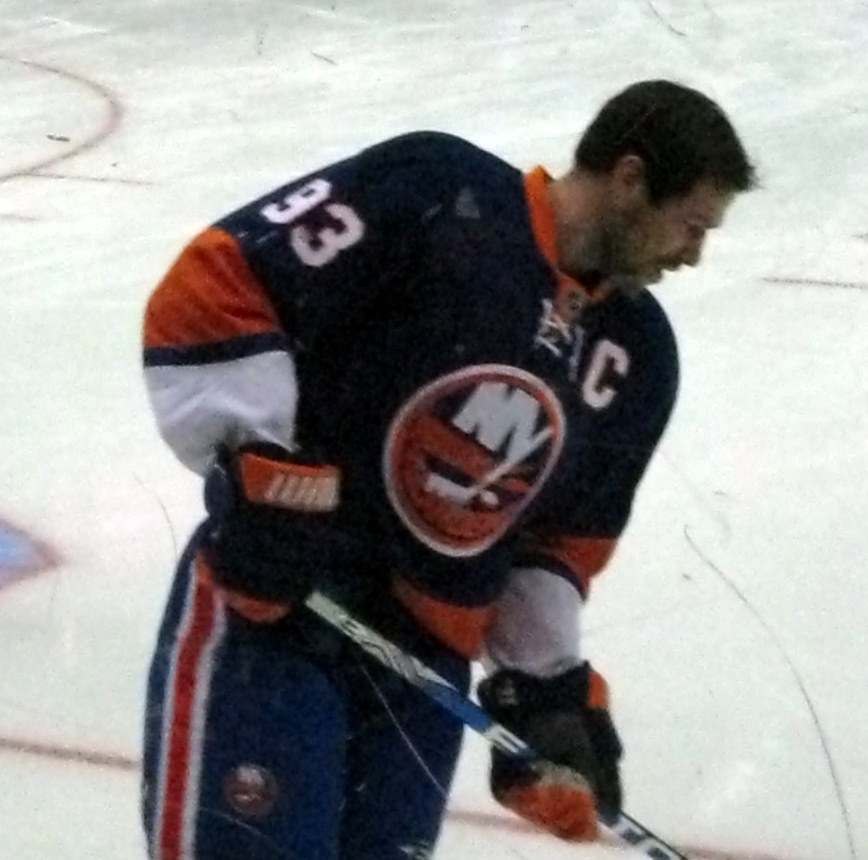
Doug Weight was named team captain in 2009, though a back injury forced him to retire in 2011. Weight served as an assistant GM from 2011 to 2018, an assistant coach from 2011 to 2017 and head coach from 2017 to 2018.

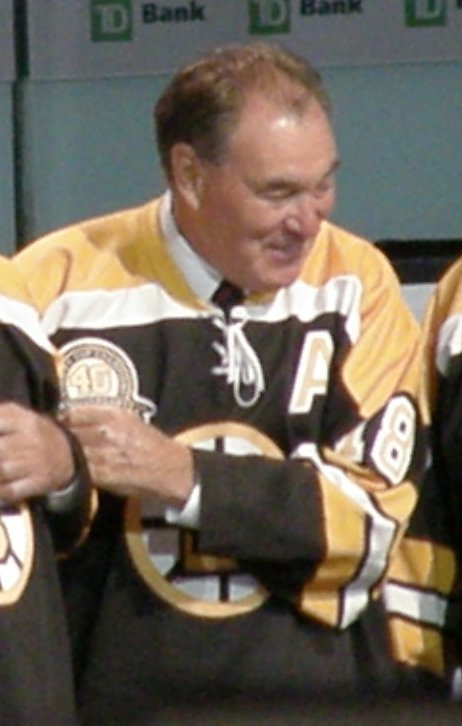
Ed Westfall spent his last seven NHL seasons with the Islanders, playing in 493 games.

New York Islanders skaters
Player	Nationality	Pos	Seasons^{B}	Regular season^{C}					Playoffs^{C}				
Player	Nationality	Pos	Seasons^{B}	GP	G	A	P	PIM	GP	G	A	P	PIM
Keith Acton	Canada	C	1993-1994	71	2	7	9	50	4	0	0	0	8
Robert Affleck	Canada	D	1983—1984	1	0	0	0	0	–	–	–	–	–
Sebastian Aho	Sweden	D	2018—2024	190	11	39	50	52	6	0	1	1	2
Micah Aivazoff	Canada	C	1995—1996	12	0	1	1	6	–	–	–	–	–
Mikael Andersson	Sweden	RW	1999—2000	19	0	3	3	4	–	–	–	–	–
Niklas Andersson	Sweden	LW	1995—1997; 1999—2000	138	29	50	79	77	–	–	–	–	–
Andy Andreoff	Canada	LW	2021—2023	9	1	1	2	0	–	–	–	–	–
David Archibald	Canada	C	1996—1997	7	0	0	0	4	–	–	–	–	–
Derek Armstrong	Canada	D	1993—1994; 1995—1997	70	7	10	17	47	–	–	–	–	–
Arron Asham	Canada	RW	2002—2007	300	47	58	105	315	15	1	1	2	20
Adrian Aucoin	Canada	D	2001—2004	235	33	80	113	186	17	3	7	10	14
Keith Aucoin	United States	C	2012—2013	41	6	6	12	4	6	0	3	3	10
Josh Bailey	Canada	C	2008—2023	1057	184	396	580	241	71	16	34	50	6
Cole Bardreau	United States	F	2019—2023	11	1	1	2	8	–	–	–	–	–
Mathew Barzal	Canada	C	2016—Present	611	153	381	534	313	60	17	28	45	43
Bob Bassen	Canada	LW	1985—1989	184	16	31	47	215	23	1	4	5	44
Shawn Bates	United States	C	2001—2008	330	58	112	170	222	17	3	4	7	15
Ken Baumgartner	Canada	LW	1989—1992	175	1	12	13	678	4	0	0	0	27
Anthony Beauvillier	Canada	LW	2016—2023	457	102	107	209	83	49	15	14	29	14
Taylor Beck	Canada	RW	2015—2016	2	0	0	0	2	–	–	–	–	–
Bob Beers	United States	D	1994—1996	35	2	12	14	16	–	–	–	–	–
Derek Bekar	Canada	C	2003—2004	4	0	0	0	2	–	–	–	–	–
Jesse Belanger	Canada	C	2000—2001	12	0	0	0	2	–	–	–	–	–
Ken Belanger	Canada	LW	1995—1999	71	4	4	8	260	–	–	–	–	–
Kieffer Bellows	United States	LW	2019—2023	68	11	14	25	25	–	–	–	–	–
Sean Bentivoglio	Canada	LW	2008—2009	1	0	0	0	2	–	–	–	–	–
Bryan Berard	United States	D	1996—1999; 2007—2008	242	31	100	131	219	–	–	–	–	–
Bill Berg	Canada	LW	1988—1989; 1990—1993	154	21	28	49	154	–	–	–	–	–
Sean Bergenheim	Finland	LW	2003—2010	246	40	40	80	195	–	–	–	–	–
Marc-Andre Bergeron	Canada	D	2006—2008	69	15	24	39	26	5	1	1	2	6
Michel Bergeron	Canada	RW	1977—1978	25	9	6	15	2	–	–	–	–	–
Marc Bergevin	Canada	D	1988—1990	76	2	17	19	92	1	0	0	0	2
Steve Bernier	Canada	RW	2015—2018	28	1	5	6	9	6	0	0	0	0
Todd Bertuzzi	Canada	RW	1995—1998	192	35	45	80	209	–	–	–	–	–
Craig Berube	Canada	LW	2000—2001	38	0	2	2	54	–	–	–	–	–
Mathieu Biron	Canada	D	1999—2001	74	4	5	9	50	–	–	–	–	–
Don Blackburn	Canada	LW	1972—1973	56	7	10	17	20	–	–	–	–	–
Jason Blake	United States	LW	2000—2007	426	127	131	258	268	21	3	4	7	19
Eric Boguniecki	United States	C	2006—2007	11	0	0	0	8	–	–	–	–	–
Samuel Bolduc	Canada	D	2022—2025	52	4	4	8	8	2	0	0	0	4
Darryl Bootland	Canada	RW	2007—2008	4	0	1	1	2	–	–	–	–	–
Adam Boqvist	Sweden	D	2024—Present	45	2	10	12	12	–	–	–	–	–
Robert Bortuzzo	Canada	D	2023—2024	23	0	0	0	20	5	0	1	1	14
Mike Bossy ††††	Canada	RW	1977—1987	752	573	553	1126	210	129	85	75	160	38
Joel Bouchard	Canada	D	2005—2006	25	1	8	9	23	–	–	–	–	–
Eric Boulton	Canada	LW	2012—2016	54	4	2	6	156	–	–	–	–	–
Bob Bourne ††††	Canada	C	1974—1986	814	238	304	542	542	129	38	54	92	108
Paul Boutilier †	Canada	D	1981—1986	213	20	69	89	250	36	1	9	10	30
Randy Boyd	Canada	D	1985—1987	85	9	29	38	116	7	0	1	1	8
Brad Boyes	Canada	RW	2012—2013	48	10	25	35	16	6	0	3	3	2
Johnny Boychuk	Canada	D	2014—2020	404	35	96	131	133	25	0	3	3	6
Derick Brassard	Canada	C	2019—2020	66	10	22	32	16	18	2	6	8	6
Kip Brennan	Canada	LW	2007—2008	3	0	0	0	12	–	–	–	–	–
Eric Brewer	Canada	D	1998—2000	89	5	8	13	52	–	–	–	–	–
Aris Brimanis	United States	D	1999—2001	48	4	8	12	27	–	–	–	–	–
Arnie Brown	Canada	D	1972—1973	1	0	0	0	0	–	–	–	–	–
Sven Butenschon	Germany	D	2002—2004	78	1	10	11	56	4	0	0	0	0
Shawn Byram	Canada	LW	1990—1991	4	0	0	0	14	–	–	–	–	–
Eric Cairns	Canada	D	1998—2004	327	9	27	36	814	13	0	0	0	28
Ryan Caldwell	Canada	D	2005—2006	2	0	0	0	2	–	–	–	–	–
Joe Callahan	United States	D	2008—2009	18	0	2	2	4	–	–	–	–	–
Craig Cameron	Canada	RW	1972—1975	187	35	34	69	59	–	–	–	–	–
Matt Campanale	United States	D	2011—2012	1	0	0	0	2	–	–	–	–	–
Chris Campoli	Canada	D	2005—2009	228	20	63	83	128	5	1	1	2	2
Matt Carkner	Canada	D	2012—2014	75	0	5	5	195	4	0	1	1	2
Billy Carroll †††	Canada	C	1980—1984	200	19	37	56	74	62	6	12	18	14
Zdeno Chara	Slovakia	D	1997—2001; 2021—2022	303	8	35	43	432	–	–	–	–	–
Vladimir Chebaturkin	Russia	D	1997—2000	27	1	3	4	20	–	–	–	–	–
Jason Chimera	Canada	LW	2016—2018	140	22	22	44	75	–	–	–	–	–
Dennis Cholowski	Canada	D	2022—2025	35	3	7	10	10	–	–	–	–	–
Tom Chorske	United States	RW	1997—1999	84	12	24	36	41	–	–	–	–	–
Dean Chynoweth	Canada	D	1988—1996	147	2	10	12	408	2	0	0	0	2
Dave Chyzowski	Canada	LW	1989—1995	118	15	16	31	138	2	0	0	0	0
Casey Cizikas	Canada	C	2011—Present	978	124	156	280	457	80	7	13	20	74
Wendel Clark	Canada	LW	1995—1996	58	24	19	43	60	–	–	–	–	–
Cal Clutterbuck	Canada	RW	2013—2024	718	81	102	183	361	76	11	7	18	96
Braydon Coburn	Canada	D	2020—2021	3	0	0	0	4	–	–	–	–	–
Danton Cole	United States	RW	1995—1996	10	1	0	1	0	–	–	–	–	–
Kevin Colley	United States	RW	2005—2006	16	0	0	0	52	–	–	–	–	–
Rob Collins	Canada	RW	2005—2006	8	1	1	2	0	–	–	–	–	–
Blake Comeau	Canada	LW	2006—2012	261	56	65	121	143	–	–	–	–	–
Jeremy Colliton	Canada	C	2005—2011	57	3	3	6	26	–	–	–	–	–
Mike Comrie	Canada	C	2007—2009	117	28	41	69	113	–	–	–	–	–
Cory Conacher	Canada	C	2014—2015	15	1	2	3	14	–	–	–	–	–
Pat Conacher	Canada	LW	1995—1996	13	1	1	2	0	–	–	–	–	–
Tim Connolly	United States	D	1999—2001	163	24	51	75	86	–	–	–	–	–
Bob Cook	Canada	RW	1972—1973	55	10	7	17	18	–	–	–	–	–
Neal Coulter	Canada	RW	1985—1987	26	5	5	10	11	–	–	–	–	–
Adam Creighton	Canada	C	1991—1992	66	15	9	24	102	–	–	–	–	–
Terry Crisp	Canada	C	1972—1973	54	4	16	20	6	–	–	–	–	–
Doug Crossman	Canada	D	1989—1991	96	16	50	66	66	5	0	1	1	6
Ted Crowley	United States	D	1998—1999	6	1	1	2	0	–	–	–	–	–
Jim Cummins	United States	RW	2001—2002	10	0	0	0	31	1	0	0	0	9
Brian Curran	Canada	D	1986—1988	90	0	11	11	424	8	0	0	0	51
Austin Czarnik	United States	C	2020—2022	15	2	3	5	0	–	–	–	–	–
Mariusz Czerkawski	Poland	RW	1997—2004	470	145	150	295	183	12	2	3	5	4
Kevin Czuczman	Canada	D	2013—2014	13	0	2	2	0	–	–	–	–	–
J. J. Daigneault	Canada	D	1997—1998	18	0	6	6	21	–	–	–	–	–
Michael Dal Colle	Canada	LW	2017—2022	112	8	13	21	18	4	0	0	0	0
Brad Dalgarno	Canada	C	1985—1996	321	49	71	120	332	27	2	4	6	37
Rod Dallman	Canada	LW	1987—1989	4	1	0	1	21	1	0	1	1	0
Craig Darby	United States	C	1994—1998	13	0	2	2	0	–	–	–	–	–
Brandon Davidson	Canada	D	2017—2018	1	0	0	0	0	–	–	–	–	–
Johan Davidsson	Sweden	C	1999—2000	14	2	4	6	0	–	–	–	–	–
Rob Davison	Canada	D	2007—2008	19	1	1	2	32	–	–	–	–	–
Jason Dawe	Canada	RW	1997—1999	35	3	5	8	14	–	–	–	–	–
Joe Day	United States	LW	1993—1994	24	0	0	0	30	–	–	–	–	–
Calvin de Haan	Canada	D	2011—2018	189	6	38	44	74	16	0	3	3	4
Tony DeAngelo	United States	D	2024—Present	111	9	45	54	53	–	–	–	–	–
Jarrett Deuling	Canada	LW	1995—1997	15	0	1	1	11	–	–	–	–	–
Kevin Devine	Canada	LW	1982—1983	2	0	1	1	8	–	–	–	–	–
Justin DiBenedetto	United States	C	2011—2012	8	0	1	1	2	–	–	–	–	–
Gerald Diduck	Canada	D	1984—1990	314	26	63	89	580	25	1	1	2	89
Rob DiMaio	Canada	RW	1988—1992	74	6	2	8	75	1	1	0	1	4
Gord Dineen	Canada	D	1982—1988; 1994—1995	287	11	53	64	380	29	1	5	6	60
Noah Dobson	Canada	D	2019—2025	388	50	180	230	118	31	0	10	10	8
Ted Donato	United States	LW	1998—1999; 2001—2002	56	7	11	18	27	–	–	–	–	–
Mike Donnelly	United States	LW	1996—1997	3	0	0	0	2	–	–	–	–	–
Matt Donovan	United States	D	2011—2015	67	2	17	19	0	2	0	0	0	10
Jamie Doornbosch	Canada	D	2010—2011	1	0	0	0	0	–	–	–	–	–
Jim Dowd	United States	C	1996—1997	3	0	0	0	0	–	–	–	–	–
Jonathan Drouin	Canada	LW	2025—Present	55	3	18	21	19	–	–	–	–	–
Jude Drouin	Canada	C	1974—1978	250	64	105	169	103	47	17	27	44	17
Ted Drury	United States	C	1999—2000	2	0	1	1	2	–	–	–	–	–
Anthony Duclair	Canada	LW	2024—Present	106	19	19	38	22	–	–	–	–	–
William Dufour	Canada	RW	2022—2023	1	0	0	0	0	–	–	–	–	–
Arnaud Durandeau	Canada	LW	2022—2023	4	0	0	0	2	–	–	–	–	–
Dallas Eakins	United States	D	1999—2000	2	0	1	1	2	–	–	–	–	–
Mark Eaton	United States	D	2010—2012	96	1	6	7	18	–	–	–	–	–
Jordan Eberle	Canada	RW	2017—2021	272	76	93	169	66	49	13	21	34	16
Victor Eklund	Sweden	RW	2025—Present	1	0	1	1	0	–	–	–	–	–
Pierre Engvall	Sweden	LW	2022—2025	154	23	29	52	40	11	2	2	4	0
John Erskine	Canada	D	2005—2006	34	1	0	1	99	–	–	–	–	–
Shawn Evans	Canada	D	1989—1990	2	1	0	1	0	–	–	–	–	–
Hudson Fasching	United States	RW	2022—2025	137	16	21	37	22	10	0	0	0	4
Drew Fata	Canada	D	2006—2008	8	1	1	2	9	–	–	–	–	–
Ruslan Fedotenko	Ukraine	LW	2007—2008	67	16	17	33	40	–	–	–	–	–
Chris Ferraro	Canada	C	1999—2000	11	1	3	4	8	–	–	–	–	–
Ray Ferraro	Canada	C	1990—1995	316	116	122	238	297	22	14	7	21	24
Jeff Finley	Canada	D	1987—1992	87	1	16	17	51	–	–	–	–	–
Joe Finley	United States	D	2012—2013	16	0	1	1	20	–	–	–	–	–
Valtteri Filppula	Finland	C	2018—2019	71	17	14	31	16	8	0	4	4	2
Tom Fitzgerald	United States	D	2012—2013	16	0	1	1	20	–	–	–	–	–
Patrick Flatley	Canada	RW	1983—1996	712	160	328	488	660	59	18	15	33	61
Mark Flood	Canada	D	2009—2010	6	0	1	1	0	–	–	–	–	–
Dave Fortier	Canada	D	1974—1976	124	6	14	20	147	20	0	2	2	33
Corey Foster	Canada	D	1996—1997	7	0	0	0	2	–	–	–	–	–
Liam Foudy	Canada	C	2024—Present	3	0	0	0	0	–	–	–	–	–
Iain Fraser	Canada	C	1992—1993	7	2	2	4	2	–	–	–	–	–
Jamie Fraser	Canada	D	2008—2009	1	0	0	0	0	–	–	–	–	–
Mitch Fritz	Canada	LW	2008—2009	20	0	0	0	42	–	–	–	–	–
Tanner Fritz	Canada	C	2017—2021	42	3	5	8	10	–	–	–	–	–
Paul Gagne	Canada	LW	1989—1990	9	1	0	1	4	–	–	–	–	–
Germain Gagnon	Canada	LW	1972—1974	125	20	43	63	39	–	–	–	–	–
Brett Gallant	Canada	LW	2013—2014	4	0	0	0	17	–	–	–	–	–
Garry Galley	Canada	D	2000—2001	56	6	14	20	59	–	–	–	–	–
Marc Gatcomb	United States	F	2024—Present	88	11	5	16	21	–	–	–	–	–
Julien Gauthier	Canada	RW	2023—2025	28	5	4	9	8	3	0	0	0	0
Isaiah George	Canada	D	2024—Present	37	1	5	6	6	–	–	–	–	–
Bruno Gervais	Canada	D	2005—2011	331	9	59	68	164	5	1	1	2	2
Greg Gilbert ††	Canada	LW	1981—1989	425	93	138	231	324	51	9	10	19	76
Clark Gillies ††††	Canada	LW	1974—1986	872	304	359	663	891	159	47	46	93	262
Trevor Gillies	Canada	LW	2009—2012	57	2	1	3	261	–	–	–	–	–
Ray Giroux	Canada	D	1999—2000; 2001—2002	16	0	9	9	12	–	–	–	–	–
Eric Godard	Canada	RW	2002—2006	107	2	3	5	260	2	0	1	1	4
Butch Goring ††††	Canada	C	1975—1985	332	87	108	195	30	99	28	40	68	26
Michael Grabner	Austria	RW	2010—2015	297	90	54	144	50	8	1	4	5	2
Mikhail Grabovski	Belarus	C	2014—2016	109	18	26	44	41	3	0	0	0	0
Denis Grebeshkov	Russia	D	2005—2006	21	0	3	3	8	–	–	–	–	–
Josh Green	Canada	C	1999—2000	49	12	14	26	41	–	–	–	–	–
Rick Green	Canada	D	1991—1992	4	0	0	0	0	–	–	–	–	–
Travis Green	Canada	C	1992—1998	388	92	145	237	258	16	3	1	4	8
Andy Greene	United States	D	2019—2022	134	3	15	18	18	40	2	3	5	20
Richard Grenier	Canada	LW	1972—1973	10	1	1	2	0	–	–	–	–	–
Brent Grieve	Canada	LW	1993—1994	3	0	0	0	7	–	–	–	–	–
Jari Gronstrand	Finland	D	1989—1991	44	3	5	8	29	3	0	0	0	4
Paul Guay	United States	RW	1990—1991	3	0	2	2	2	–	–	–	–	–
Bill Guerin	United States	RW	2007—2009	142	39	41	80	128	–	–	–	–	–
Ari Haanpaa	Finland	RW	1985—1988	60	6	11	17	37	6	0	0	0	10
Sean Haggerty	United States	LW	1997—1998; 1999—2000	10	1	1	2	4	–	–	–	–	–
Micheal Haley	Canada	LW	2009—2012	43	2	1	3	151	–	–	–	–	–
Bob Halkidis	Canada	D	1995—1996	5	0	0	0	30	–	–	–	–	–
Kevin Haller	Canada	D	2000—2002	31	1	5	6	58	–	–	–	–	–
Mats Hallin †	Sweden	C	1982—1985	108	14	12	26	103	14	1	0	1	13
Mike Halmo	Canada	LW	2013—2014	20	1	0	1	32	–	–	–	–	–
Jeff Hamilton	United States	C	2003—2006	14	2	6	8	8	–	–	–	–	–
Travis Hamonic	Canada	D	2010—2017	444	26	120	146	452	17	1	3	4	31
Roman Hamrlik	Czech Republic	D	2000—2004	300	43	110	153	325	17	1	9	10	10
Mark Hamway	United States	RW	1984—1987	53	5	13	18	9	1	0	0	0	0
Ron Handy	Canada	LW	1984—1985	10	0	2	2	0	–	–	–	–	–
Richie Hansen	United States	C	1976—1979	18	2	6	8	4	–	–	–	–	–
David Harlock	Canada	D	1998—1999	70	2	6	8	68	–	–	–	–	–
Billy Harris	Canada	RW	1972—1980	623	184	259	443	296	59	17	17	34	44
Gerry Hart	Canada	D	1972—1979	476	20	108	128	783	58	3	9	12	115
Neil Hawryliw	Canada	RW	1981—1982	1	0	0	0	0	–	–	–	–	–
Emil Heineman	Sweden	LW	2025—Present	82	22	9	31	18	–	–	–	–	–
Raimo Helminen	Finland	C	1988—1989	24	1	11	12	4	–	–	–	–	–
Darby Hendrickson	United States	C	1995—1996	16	1	4	5	33	–	–	–	–	–
Lorne Henning ††	Canada	C	1972—1981	543	73	111	184	102	81	7	7	14	8
Dale Henry	Canada	LW	1984—1990	132	13	26	39	263	14	1	0	1	19
Ian Herbers	Canada	D	1999—2000	6	0	3	3	0	–	–	–	–	–
Jason Herter	Canada	D	1995—1996	1	0	1	1	0	–	–	–	–	–
Jamie Heward	Canada	D	1999—2000	54	6	11	17	26	–	–	–	–	–
Ernie Hicke	Canada	LW	1983—1984	76	8	13	21	66	–	–	–	–	–
Thomas Hickey	Canada	D	2012—2022	456	22	95	117	190	24	1	5	6	12
Andy Hilbert	United States	LW	2006—2009	218	27	44	71	74	5	0	0	0	2
Sean Hill	United States	D	2006—2007	81	4	21	25	110	4	0	0	0	0
Jack Hillen	United States	D	2007—2011	175	8	42	50	109	–	–	–	–	–
Randy Hillier	Canada	D	1991—1992	8	0	0	0	11	–	–	–	–	–
Benoit Hogue	Canada	LW	1991—1995	258	105	124	229	282	22	6	7	13	35
Jason Holland	Canada	D	1996—1998	12	1	0	1	4	–	–	–	–	–
Simon Holmstrom	Sweden	RW	2022—Present	279	60	60	120	38	3	0	0	0	0
Mike Hordy	Canada	D	1978—1980	11	0	0	0	0	–	–	–	–	–
Bo Horvat	Canada	C	2022—Present	260	99	99	198	101	11	2	3	5	0
Doug Houda	Canada	D	1996—1998	101	3	10	13	0	–	–	–	–	–
Josh Ho-Sang	Canada	RW	2016—2021	53	7	17	24	20	–	–	–	–	–
Mike Hough	Canada	LW	1997—1999	85	5	7	12	29	–	–	–	–	–
Garry Howatt ††	Canada	LW	1972—1981	596	93	120	213	1466	87	12	14	26	289
Scott Howson	Canada	C	1984—1986	18	5	3	8	4	–	–	–	–	–
Tony Hrkac	Canada	C	1999—2000	7	0	2	2	0	–	–	–	–	–
Dave Hudson	Canada	C	1972—1974	132	14	29	43	24	–	–	–	–	–
Brent Hughes	Canada	LW	1996—1997	51	7	3	10	57	–	–	–	–	–
Trent Hunter	Canada	RW	2002—2011	459	99	130	229	201	14	4	1	5	6
Grant Hutton	United States	C	2021—2025	31	1	2	3	8	–	–	–	–	–
Mike Iggulden	Canada	C	2008—2009	11	1	4	5	4	–	–	–	–	–
Brad Isbister	Canada	LW	1999—2003	247	67	68	135	306	3	1	1	2	17
Ruslan Iskhakov	Russia	C	2023—2024	1	0	1	1	0	1	0	0	0	0
Tim Jackman	United States	RW	2007—2010	159	10	15	25	310	–	–	–	–	–
Dane Jackson	Canada	RW	1997—1998	8	1	1	2	4	–	–	–	–	–
Craig Janney	United States	C	1998—1999	18	1	4	5	4	–	–	–	–	–
Mark Janssens	Canada	C	1997—1998	12	0	0	0	34	–	–	–	–	–
Cole Jarrett	Canada	LW	2005—2006	1	0	0	0	0	–	–	–	–	–
Jesse Joensuu	Finland	LW	2008—2013	67	8	7	15	47	1	0	0	0	0
Glenn Johannesen	Canada	D	1985—1986	2	0	0	0	0	–	–	–	–	–
Andreas Johansson	Sweden	LW	1995—1997	18	2	3	5	0	–	–	–	–	–
Aaron Johnson	Canada	D	2007—2008	30	0	2	2	30	–	–	–	–	–
Randy Johnston	Canada	D	1979—1980	4	0	0	0	4	–	–	–	–	–
Ross Johnston	Canada	LW	2015—2023	134	9	15	24	283	5	0	0	0	12
Olli Jokinen	Finland	D	1999—2000	82	11	10	21	80	–	–	–	–	–
Jorgen Jonsson	Sweden	C	1999—2000	68	11	17	28	16	–	–	–	–	–
Kenny Jonsson	Sweden	D	1995—2004	597	57	175	232	260	15	1	3	4	6
Tomas Jonsson ††	Sweden	D	1981—1989	532	84	249	333	460	76	9	26	35	91
Steve Junker	Canada	RW	1993—1994	5	0	0	0	0	–	–	–	–	–
Milan Jurcina	Slovakia	D	2010—2012	111	7	21	28	60	–	–	–	–	–
Anders Kallur ††††	Sweden	C	1979—1985	383	101	110	211	149	78	12	23	35	32
Yan Kaminsky	Russia	LW	1993—1995	25	3	2	5	4	2	0	0	0	4
Alexander Karpovtsev	Russia	D	2003—2004	3	0	1	1	4	–	–	–	–	–
Darius Kasparaitis	Russia	D	1992—1997	232	6	40	46	439	22	0	5	5	39
Mike Kaszycki	Canada	C	1977—1980	145	30	51	81	76	17	2	6	8	8
Mark Katic	Canada	D	2010—2011	11	0	1	1	4	–	–	–	–	–
Bracken Kearns	Canada	C	2015—2017	4	0	1	1	4	–	–	–	–	–
Matt Keith	Canada	RW	2007—2008	3	0	0	0	0	–	–	–	–	–
Mike Kennedy	Canada	C	1998—1999	1	0	0	0	2	–	–	–	–	–
Tyler Kennedy	Canada	C	2014—2015	13	2	3	5	2	3	0	0	0	2
Alan Kerr	Canada	RW	1984—1991	326	69	85	154	691	29	3	4	7	53
Alexander Kharitonov	Russia	RW	2001—2002	5	0	0	0	4	–	–	–	–	–
Derek King	Canada	LW	1986—1997	638	211	288	499	344	31	3	14	17	20
Marko Kiprusoff	Finland	D	2001—2002	27	0	6	6	4	–	–	–	–	–
Anton Klementyev	Russia	D	2009—2010	1	0	0	0	0	–	–	–	–	–
Matt Koalska	United States	C	2005—2006	3	0	0	0	2	–	–	–	–	–
Dustin Kohn	Canada	D	2009—2010	22	0	4	4	4	–	–	–	–	–
Otto Koivula	Finland	LW	2019—2023	28	0	4	4	6	–	–	–	–	–
Juraj Kolnik	Slovakia	RW	2000—2002	36	6	3	9	12	–	–	–	–	–
Leo Komarov	Finland	C	2018—2022	164	11	37	48	69	44	2	6	8	26
Zenon Konopka	Canada	C	2010—2011	82	2	7	9	307	–	–	–	–	–
Steve Konroyd	Canada	D	1985—1989	169	8	41	49	187	23	2	4	6	20
Evgeny Korolev	Russia	D	1999—2002	42	1	4	5	20	2	0	0	0	0
Roger Kortko	Canada	C	1984—1986	79	7	17	24	28	10	0	3	3	17
Viktor Kozlov	Russia	C	2006—2007	81	25	26	51	28	5	0	2	2	2
Jason Krog	Canada	C	1999—2002	28	2	7	9	6	–	–	–	–	–
Richard Kromm	Canada	LW	1985—1993	183	27	42	69	48	22	1	4	5	9
Uwe Krupp	Germany	D	1991—1994	180	22	72	94	140	22	1	6	7	16
Paul Kruse	Canada	LW	1996—1998	110	10	3	13	249	–	–	–	–	–
Tom Kuhnhackl	Germany	RW	2018—2020	36	4	5	9	10	8	0	3	3	2
Nikolay Kulemin	Russia	LW	2014—2018	248	37	42	79	61	18	2	4	6	4
Tom Kurvers	United States	D	1991—1994	192	26	108	134	115	15	0	2	2	8
Dale Kushner	Canada	LW	1989—1990	2	0	0	0	2	–	–	–	–	–
Oleg Kvasha	Russia	C	2000—2006	332	60	96	156	250	17	1	2	3	8
Scott Lachance	United States	D	1991—1999	450	26	79	105	348	3	0	0	0	0
Daniel Lacroix	Canada	C	1999—2000	1	0	0	0	0	–	–	–	–	–
Andrew Ladd	Canada	LW	2016—2020	181	39	33	72	89	1	0	0	0	0
Paul LaDue	United States	D	2021—2022	1	0	0	0	0	–	–	–	–	–
Pat Lafontaine	United States	C	1983—1991	530	287	279	566	309	50	14	21	35	30
Gord Lane ††††	Canada	D	1979—1985	305	9	51	60	614	75	3	14	17	214
Dave Langevin ††††	United States	D	1979—1985	422	12	95	107	465	82	2	16	18	97
Claude Lapointe	Canada	C	1993—2003	535	76	95	171	354	7	0	0	0	14
Reed Larson	United States	D	1988—1989	33	7	13	20	35	–	–	–	–	–
Brad Lauer	Canada	RW	1986—1992	259	38	60	98	200	15	5	3	8	18
Brian Lavender	Canada	LW	1972—1973	43	6	6	12	47	–	–	–	–	–
Mark Lawrence	Canada	RW	1997—2001	127	18	25	43	98	–	–	–	–	–
Derek Laxdal	Canada	RW	1989—1991	16	3	1	4	4	1	0	2	2	2
Nick Leddy	United States	D	2014—2021	518	45	198	243	111	67	5	18	23	2
Walt Ledingham	Canada	LW	1974—1975; 1976—1977	6	0	1	1	0	–	–	–	–	–
Anders Lee	United States	C	2012—Present	923	308	241	549	546	46	10	11	21	48
Bryan Lefley	Canada	D	1972—1974	70	3	7	10	56	–	–	–	–	–
Ken Leiter	United States	D	1984—1988	139	14	36	50	62	15	0	6	6	8
Alan Letang	Canada	D	2002—2003	4	0	0	0	0	–	–	–	–	–
Dave Lewis	Canada	D	1973—1980	514	24	117	141	409	59	1	9	10	90
Jeff Libby	United States	D	1997—1998	1	0	0	0	0	–	–	–	–	–
Trevor Linden	Canada	C	1997—1999	107	28	36	64	65	–	–	–	–	–
Mats Lindgren	Sweden	C	1998—2002	134	20	26	46	52	–	–	–	–	–
Brett Lindros	Canada	RW	1994—1996	51	2	5	7	147	–	–	–	–	–
Claude Loiselle	Canada	C	1991—1994	69	7	5	12	152	18	0	3	3	10
Troy Loney	Canada	LW	1994—1995	26	5	4	9	23	–	–	–	–	–
Bob Lorimer ††	Canada	D	1976—1981	220	8	47	55	172	49	3	10	13	83
Craig Ludwig	United States	D	1990—1991	75	1	8	9	77	–	–	–	–	–
Warren Luhning	Canada	D	1997—1999	19	0	0	0	8	–	–	–	–	–
Brad Lukowich	Canada	D	2005—2006	57	1	12	13	32	–	–	–	–	–
Chris Luongo	United States	D	1993—1996	138	5	13	18	104	–	–	–	–	–
Andrew MacDonald	Canada	D	2008—2014	295	17	72	89	139	4	0	0	0	4
Garth MacGuigan	Canada	C	1979—1980; 1983—1984	5	0	1	1	0	–	–	–	–	–
Kyle MacLean	United States	F	2023—Present	172	10	17	27	65	5	1	0	1	5
Bill MacMillan	Canada	D	1973—1977	231	32	36	68	51	42	6	3	9	38
Mike MacWilliam	Canada	C	1995—1996	6	0	0	0	14	–	–	–	–	–
Jim Mair	Canada	D	1972—1973	49	2	11	13	41	–	–	–	–	–
Mikko Makela	Finland	RW	1985—1990	307	95	124	219	98	17	3	8	11	14
Vladimir Malakhov	Russia	D	1992—1995	166	27	98	125	171	21	3	6	9	18
David Maley	United States	LW	1993—1994	37	0	6	6	74	3	0	0	0	0
Dean Malkoc	Canada	D	1998—1999	2	0	1	1	7	–	–	–	–	–
Don Maloney	Canada	LW	1989—1991	91	16	32	48	53	5	0	0	0	2
Eric Manlow	Canada	C	2002—2004	26	2	3	5	6	–	–	–	–	–
Justin Mapletoft	Canada	C	2002—2004	38	3	6	9	8	2	0	0	0	0
Brian Marchinko	Canada	C	1972—1974	44	2	6	8	0	–	–	–	–	–
Hector Marini ††	Canada	RW	1978—1979; 1980—1982	1	0	0	0	0	–	–	–	–	–
Chris Marinucci	United States	D	1994—1995	12	1	4	5	2	–	–	–	–	–
Masi Marjamaki	Finland	LW	2005—2006	1	0	0	0	0	–	–	–	–	–
Daniel Marois	Canada	RW	1991—1993	40	2	10	12	53	–	–	–	–	–
Bert Marshall	Canada	D	1973—1979	392	8	87	95	348	43	3	10	13	43
Matt Martin	Canada	LW	2009—2016; 2018—2025	855	73	84	157	995	82	8	3	11	141
Radek Martinek	Czech Republic	D	2001—2011; 2012—2013	466	24	82	106	276	11	0	1	1	6
Steve Martins	Canada	C	2000—2001	39	1	3	4	20	–	–	–	–	–
Greg Mauldin	United States	C	2009—2010	1	0	0	0	0	–	–	–	–	–
Scott Mayfield	United States	D	2013—Present	615	30	110	140	540	57	4	12	16	47
Wayne McBean	Canada	D	1988—1994	120	8	24	32	95	2	1	1	2	0
Bryan McCabe	Canada	D	1995—1998	220	18	45	63	466	–	–	–	–	–
Colin McDonald	United States	RW	2012—2015	133	17	26	43	66	8	2	1	3	4
Hubie McDonough	United States	C	1989—1992	139	31	19	50	51	5	1	0	1	4
Mike McEwen †††	Canada	D	1980—1984	143	12	55	67	82	44	9	17	26	28
Bob McGill	Canada	D	1993—1994	3	0	0	0	5	–	–	–	–	–
Marty McInnis	United States	LW	1991—1997	337	79	119	198	115	7	0	1	1	0
Alex McKendry †	Canada	LW	1977—1980	10	0	0	0	2	6	2	2	4	0
Todd McLellan	Canada	C	1987—1988	5	1	1	2	0	–	–	–	–	–
Dave McLlwain	Canada	C	1991—1992; 1996—1997	58	9	16	25	28	–	–	–	–	–
Kurtis McLean	Canada	C	2008—2009	4	1	0	1	0	–	–	–	–	–
Cole McWard	United States	D	2025—Present	3	0	0	0	0	–	–	–	–	–
Wayne Merrick ††††	Canada	C	1977—1984	411	81	116	197	135	95	18	28	46	28
Freddy Meyer	United States	D	2006—2010	178	11	28	39	100	–	–	–	–	–
Branislav Mezei	Slovakia	D	2000—2002	66	1	6	7	65	–	–	–	–	–
Petr Mika	Czech Republic	RW	1999—2000	3	0	0	0	0	–	–	–	–	–
Bill Mikkelson	Canada	D	1972—1973	72	1	10	11	45	–	–	–	–	–
Kevin Miller	United States	C	1998—1999	33	1	5	6	13	–	–	–	–	–
Kip Miller	United States	C	1994—1995; 1997—1998; 2001—2002	54	8	21	29	8	7	4	2	6	2
Tom Miller	Canada	C	1972—1975	89	15	18	33	25	–	–	–	–	–
Travis Mitchell	United States	D	2025—Present	9	1	0	1	6	–	–	–	–	–
Ken Morrow ††††	United States	D	1979—1989	550	17	88	105	309	127	11	22	33	97
Mike Mottau	United States	D	2010—2012	49	0	5	5	23	–	–	–	–	–
Kael Mouillierat	Canada	LW	2014—2015	6	1	1	2	8	–	–	–	–	–
Matt Moulson	Canada	LW	2009—2013	304	118	105	223	56	6	2	1	3	10
Bill Muckalt	Canada	RW	1999—2001	72	15	18	33	37	–	–	–	–	–
Brian Mullen	United States	RW	1992—1993	81	18	14	32	28	18	3	4	7	2
Kirk Muller	Canada	LW	1994—1996	27	7	8	15	29	–	–	–	–	–
Ken Murray	Canada	D	1972—1973	39	0	4	4	59	–	–	–	–	–
Anders Myrvold	Norway	D	2000—2001	12	0	1	1	0	–	–	–	–	–
Dmitri Nabokov	Russia	RW	1998—2000	30	4	9	13	18	–	–	–	–	–
Evgeny Namestnikov	Russia	D	1997—1998	6	0	1	1	4	–	–	–	–	–
Alain Nasreddine	Canada	D	2002—2003	3	0	0	0	2	–	–	–	–	–
Brock Nelson	United States	C	2013—2025	901	295	279	574	318	78	27	23	50	40
Sergei Nemchinov	Russia	LW	1997—1999	141	18	27	45	46	–	–	–	–	–
Aaron Ness	United States	D	2011—2014	29	1	2	3	12	–	–	–	–	–
Neil Nicholson	Canada	D	1972—1974; 1977—1978	39	3	1	4	23	–	–	–	–	–
Nino Niederreiter	Switzerland	RW	2010—2012	64	2	1	3	20	–	–	–	–	–
Frans Nielsen	Denmark	C	2006—2016	606	119	230	349	112	24	4	6	10	2
Janne Niinimaa	Finland	D	2002—2006	136	11	33	44	140	10	1	3	4	14
Robert Nilsson	Sweden	C	2005—2006	53	6	14	20	26	–	–	–	–	–
Petteri Nokelainen	Finland	C	2005—2006	15	1	1	2	4	–	–	–	–	–
Jeff Norton	United States	D	1987—1993	282	22	166	188	232	17	2	6	8	34
Gary Nylund	Canada	D	1988—1993	211	11	52	63	376	5	0	2	2	17
Bob Nystrom ††††	Sweden	RW	1972—1986	900	235	278	513	1248	157	39	44	83	236
Gino Odjick	Canada	LW	1997—2000	82	9	13	22	254	–	–	–	–	–
Todd Okerlund	United States	D	1987—1988	4	0	0	0	2	–	–	–	–	–
Kyle Okposo	United States	RW	2007—2016	529	139	230	369	310	24	7	8	15	11
Vladimir Orszagh	Slovakia	LW	1997—2000	34	3	2	5	12	–	–	–	–	–
Jean-Gabriel Pageau	Canada	C	2019—Present	443	89	130	219	111	51	12	15	27	27
Ondrej Palat	Czech Republic	C	2025—Present	29	1	4	5	2	–	–	–	–	–
Zigmund Palffy	Slovakia	RW	1993—1999	331	168	163	331	173	–	–	–	–	–
Kyle Palmieri	United States	RW	2020—Present	330	93	97	190	137	30	10	7	17	26
Jay Pandolfo	United States	LW	2011—2012	62	1	2	3	8	–	–	–	–	–
Richard Panik	Slovakia	RW	2021—2022	4	0	1	1	0	–	–	–	–	–
Grigorijs Pantelejevs	Latvia	LW	1995—1996	4	0	0	0	0	–	–	–	–	–
Justin Papineau	Canada	RW	2002—2004	69	9	7	16	12	1	0	0	0	0
P. A. Parenteau	Canada	RW	2010—2012	161	38	82	120	0	–	–	–	–	–
J. P. Parise	Canada	LW	1974—1978	240	73	98	171	160	41	16	18	34	38
Zach Parise	United States	LW	2021—2023	164	36	33	69	52	6	0	0	0	2
Richard Park	United States	RW	2006—2010	316	45	75	120	115	5	0	1	1	2
Greg Parks	Canada	C	1991—1993	23	1	2	3	6	2	0	0	0	0
Mark Parrish	United States	RW	2000—2006	345	118	96	214	122	17	4	3	7	10
Scott Pearson	Canada	LW	1999—2000	2	0	1	1	0	–	–	–	–	–
Michael Peca	Canada	C	2001—2004	222	49	93	114	122	15	1	0	1	12
Adam Pelech	Canada	D	2015—Present	642	30	147	177	283	59	3	13	16	33
John Persson	Sweden	LW	2013—2014	10	1	0	1	6	–	–	–	–	–
Stefan Persson ††††	Sweden	D	1977—1986	622	52	317	369	574	102	7	50	57	69
Scott Perunovich	United States	D	2024—2025	11	0	3	3	4	–	–	–	–	–
Robert Petrovicky	Slovakia	C	2000—2001	11	0	0	0	4	–	–	–	–	–
Tomi Pettinen	Finland	D	2002—2006	24	0	0	0	18	–	–	–	–	–
Rich Pilon	Canada	D	1988—2000	509	6	54	60	1525	15	0	0	0	50
Dan Plante	United States	RW	1993—1998	159	9	14	23	135	–	–	–	–	–
Thomas Pock	Austria	D	2008—2009	59	1	2	3	35	–	–	–	–	–
Jason Podollan	Canada	C	2001—2002	1	0	0	0	2	–	–	–	–	–
Tom Poti	United States	D	2006—2007	78	6	38	44	74	5	0	3	3	6
Denis Potvin ††††	Canada	D	1973—1988	1060	310	740	1052	1356	185	56	108	164	253
Jean Potvin ††	Canada	D	1972—1981	402	46	167	213	330	39	2	9	11	17
Pat Price	Canada	D	1975—1979	182	8	45	53	104	22	0	3	3	29
Shane Prince	United States	C	2015—2018	20	3	2	5	4	11	3	1	4	0
Chris Pryor	United States	D	1987—1990	18	0	0	0	51	–	–	–	–	–
David Pulkkinen	Canada	LW	1972—1973	2	0	0	0	0	–	–	–	–	–
Ryan Pulock	Canada	D	2015—Present	636	56	185	241	123	66	8	19	27	20
Taylor Pyatt	Canada	LW	2000—2001	78	4	14	18	39	–	–	–	–	–
Alan Quine	Canada	C	2015—2018	84	6	16	22	12	10	1	4	5	2
Deron Quint	United States	D	2006—2007	5	0	0	0	0	–	–	–	–	–
Rhett Rakhshani	United States	RW	2010—2012	7	0	0	0	0	–	–	–	–	–
Aatu Raty	Finland	C	2022—2023	12	2	0	2	4	–	–	–	–	–
Marty Reasoner	United States	C	2011—2013	92	1	10	11	38	1	0	0	0	17
Joel Rechlicz	United States	RW	2008—2010	23	0	1	1	95	–	–	–	–	–
Joe Reekie	Canada	D	1989—1992	151	8	36	44	224	–	–	–	–	–
Dylan Reese	United States	D	2009—2012	74	3	14	17	40	–	–	–	–	–
Darcy Regier	Canada	D	1982—1984	11	0	1	1	7	–	–	–	–	–
Steve Regier	Canada	LW	2005—2008	18	0	0	0	4	–	–	–	–	–
Peter Regin	Denmark	C	2013—2014	44	2	5	7	18	–	–	–	–	–
Robert Reichel	Czech Republic	C	1996—1999	164	49	91	140	86	–	–	–	–	–
Mike Reilly	United States	D	2023—2025	77	6	20	26	30	5	1	1	2	0
Griffin Reinhart	Canada	D	2014—2015	8	0	1	1	6	1	0	0	0	0
Barry Richter	United States	D	1998—1999	72	6	18	24	34	–	–	–	–	–
Calum Ritchie	Canada	C	2025—Present	65	13	17	30	22	–	–	–	–	–
Jamie Rivers	Canada	D	1999—2000	75	1	16	17	84	–	–	–	–	–
Randy Robitaille	Canada	C	2002—2003; 2006—2007	60	7	19	26	24	–	–	–	–	–
Dave Roche	Canada	LW	2001—2002	1	0	0	0	0	–	–	–	–	–
Brian Rolston	United States	C	2011—2012	49	4	5	9	6	–	–	–	–	–
Alexander Romanov	Russia	D	2022—Present	236	13	52	65	89	9	0	1	1	2
Doug Rombough	Canada	C	1973—1975	40	8	7	15	14	–	–	–	–	–
Cliff Ronning	Canada	C	2003—2004	40	9	15	24	2	4	0	0	0	0
Allan Rourke	Canada	D	2005—2007	17	0	2	2	4	–	–	–	–	–
Joe Sacco	United States	LW	1997—1999	98	6	3	9	55	–	–	–	–	–
Robin Salo	Finland	D	2021—2023	32	3	6	9	8	–	–	–	–	–
Dave Salvian	Canada	RW	1976—1977	1	0	1	1	2	–	–	–	–	–
Miroslav Satan	Slovakia	RW	2005—2008	243	78	88	166	139	5	1	2	3	0
Luca Sbisa	Switzerland	D	2018—2019	9	0	1	1	4	–	–	–	–	–
Dave Scatchard	Canada	C	1999—2004	347	81	87	168	504	17	2	2	4	34
Matthew Schaefer	Canada	D	2025—Present	82	23	36	59	38	–	–	–	–	–
Brayden Schenn	Canada	C	2025—Present	19	6	5	11	19	–	–	–	–	–
Mathieu Schneider	United States	D	1994—1996	78	14	42	56	123	–	–	–	–	–
Rob Schremp	United States	C	2009—2011	89	17	30	47	20	–	–	–	–	–
Ray Schultz	Canada	D	1997—2003	45	0	4	4	155	2	0	0	0	2
Scott Scissons	Canada	C	1990—1991; 1993—1994	2	0	0	0	0	1	0	0	0	0
Dennis Seidenberg	Germany	D	2016—2018	101	5	22	27	49	–	–	–	–	–
Alexander Semak	Russia	C	1995—1996	69	20	14	34	68	–	–	–	–	–
Brent Severyn	Canada	LW	1994—1996	84	2	11	13	214	–	–	–	–	–
Max Shabanov	Russia	F	2025—Present	44	5	13	18	2	–	–	–	–	–
Mike Sillinger	Canada	C	2006—2009	141	42	45	87	74	5	1	1	2	2
Jon Sim	Canada	LW	2007—2011	162	23	19	42	110	–	–	–	–	–
Chris Simon	Canada	LW	2006—2008	95	11	19	30	118	–	–	–	–	–
Jason Simon	Canada	LW	1993—1994	4	0	0	0	34	–	–	–	–	–
Shane Sims	United States	D	2010—2011	1	0	0	0	0	–	–	–	–	–
Brett Skinner	Canada	D	2008—2009	11	0	0	0	4	–	–	–	–	–
Brandon Smith	Canada	D	2002—2003	3	0	0	0	0	–	–	–	–	–
Ron Smith	Canada	D	1972—1973	11	1	1	2	14	–	–	–	–	–
Trevor Smith	Canada	C	2008—2009	7	1	0	1	0	–	–	–	–	–
Vern Smith	Canada	D	1984—1985	1	0	0	0	0	–	–	–	–	–
Wyatt Smith	United States	C	2005—2006	42	0	8	8	26	–	–	–	–	–
Bryan Smolinski	United States	C	1996—1999	227	57	82	139	108	–	–	–	–	–
Ryan Smyth	Canada	LW	2006—2007	18	5	10	15	14	5	1	3	4	4
Brent Sopel	Canada	D	2005—2006	57	2	25	27	64	–	–	–	–	–
Nikita Soshnikov	Russia	RW	2022—2023	3	0	0	0	0	–	–	–	–	–
Carson Soucy	Canada	D	2025—Present	30	2	2	4	20	–	–	–	–	–
Brian Spencer	Canada	LW	1972—1974	132	19	40	59	155	–	–	–	–	–
Matthew Spiller	Canada	D	2007—2008	9	0	1	1	7	–	–	–	–	–
Andre St. Laurent	Canada	C	1973—1978	261	38	66	104	191	40	4	9	13	27
Steve Staios	Canada	D	2011—2012	65	0	8	8	53	–	–	–	–	–
Paul Stanton	United States	D	1994—1995	18	0	4	4	9	–	–	–	–	–
Mike Stapleton	Canada	C	2000—2001	34	1	4	5	2	–	–	–	–	–
Mike Stevens	Canada	RW	1988—1989	9	1	0	1	4	–	–	–	–	–
Ralph Stewart	Canada	C	1972—1976	198	49	61	110	24	19	4	4	8	2
Ron Stewart	Canada	RW	1972—1973	22	2	2	4	4	–	–	–	–	–
Brian Strait	United States	D	2012—2016	1	0	0	0	0	13	1	0	1	16
Martin Straka	Czech Republic	C	1995—1996	22	2	10	12	6	–	–	–	–	–
Mark Streit	Switzerland	D	2008—2013	286	40	139	179	178	–	–	–	–	–
Ryan Strome	Canada	C	2013—2017	258	45	81	126	123	15	3	5	8	4
Jason Strudwick	Canada	D	1995—1996; 1997—1998	18	0	1	1	43	–	–	–	–	–
Johan Sundstrom	Sweden	C	2013—2014	11	0	1	1	6	–	–	–	–	–
Brent Sutter ††	Canada	C	1980—1992	694	287	323	610	761	68	24	35	59	120
Duane Sutter ††††	Canada	RW	1979—1987	547	121	171	292	893	120	22	30	52	321
Ron Sutter	Canada	C	1994—1995	27	1	4	5	21	–	–	–	–	–
Andy Sutton	Canada	D	2007—2010	135	7	23	30	199	–	–	–	–	–
Ken Sutton	Canada	D	2001—2002	21	0	2	2	8	–	–	–	–	–
Bob Sweeney	United States	C	1995—1996	66	6	6	12	59	–	–	–	–	–
Jeff Tambellini	Canada	LW	2005—2010	176	18	28	46	68	–	–	–	–	–
Steve Tambellini †	Canada	C	1978—1981	107	24	25	49	21	–	–	–	–	–
Dick Tarnstrom	Sweden	D	2001—2002	62	3	16	19	38	5	0	0	0	2
John Tavares	Canada	C	2009—2018	510	207	264	471	243	24	11	11	22	12
Chris Taylor	Canada	C	1994—1997	22	0	4	4	4	–	–	–	–	–
Vic Teal	Canada	RW	1973—1974	1	0	0	0	0	–	–	–	–	–
Gilles Thibaudeau	Canada	C	1989—1990	20	4	4	8	17	–	–	–	–	–
Steve Thomas	Canada	RW	1991—1995	275	118	140	258	381	22	10	8	18	45
Nate Thompson	United States	C	2008—2010	82	3	7	10	88	–	–	–	–	–
Milan Tichy	Czech Republic	D	1994—1996	10	0	4	4	10	–	–	–	–	–
Mattias Timander	Sweden	D	2002—2004	85	4	14	18	26	1	0	0	0	0
Dmytro Timashov	Sweden	LW	2020—2021	1	0	0	0	0	–	–	–	–	–
Devon Toews	Canada	D	2018—2020	48	5	13	18	4	8	1	4	5	0
Jeff Toms	Canada	LW	2000—2001	39	2	4	6	10	–	–	–	–	–
John Tonelli ††††	Canada	LW	1978—1986	594	206	338	544	473	113	28	55	83	113
Raffi Torres	Canada	LW	2001—2003	31	0	6	6	16	–	–	–	–	–
Graeme Townshend	Canada	LW	1991—1993	9	1	2	3	0	–	–	–	–	–
Bryan Trottier ††††	Canada	C	1975—1990	1123	500	853	1353	798	175	64	106	170	220
Maxim Tsyplakov	Russia	C	2024—Present	104	11	26	37	45	–	–	–	–	–
Marko Tuomainen	Finland	RW	2001—2002	1	0	0	0	0	–	–	–	–	–
Pierre Turgeon	Canada	C	1991—1995	255	147	193	340	70	15	6	8	14	0
Brad Turner	Canada	D	1991—1992	3	0	0	0	0	–	–	–	–	–
David Ullstrom	Sweden	LW	2011—2013	49	6	7	13	12	3	0	1	1	0
Nicholas Vachon	Canada	D	2001—2002	1	0	0	0	0	–	–	–	–	–
Thomas Vanek	Austria	LW	2013—2014	47	17	27	44	34	–	–	–	–	–
Darren Van Impe	Canada	D	2001—2002	14	1	2	3	16	7	0	4	4	8
Josef Vasicek	Czech Republic	C	2007—2008	81	16	19	35	53	–	–	–	–	–
Andrei Vasilyev	Russia	LW	1994—1997	15	2	5	7	6	–	–	–	–	–
Dennis Vaske	United States	D	1990—1998	232	5	41	46	247	22	0	7	7	4
Yvon Vautour	Canada	RW	1979—1980	17	3	1	4	24	–	–	–	–	–
Lubomir Visnovsky	Slovakia	D	2012—2015	112	11	34	45	38	16	0	7	7	4
David Volek	Czechoslovakia; Czech Republic	LW	1988—1994	396	95	154	249	201	15	5	5	10	2
Mick Vukota	Canada	RW	1987—1997	510	16	29	45	1879	22	0	0	0	73
Chris Wagner	United States	C	2017—2018	15	1	0	1	2	–	–	–	–	–
Oliver Wahlstrom	United States	RW	2019—2025	220	36	35	71	148	5	1	2	3	8
Tim Wallace	Canada	RW	2011—2012	31	0	1	1	6	–	–	–	–	–
Mike Walsh	United States	LW	1987—1989	14	2	0	2	4	–	–	–	–	–
Ben Walter	Canada	C	2007—2009	12	1	0	1	0	–	–	–	–	–
Marshall Warren	United States	D	2025—Present	8	0	3	3	4	–	–	–	–	–
Mike Watt	Canada	LW	2008—2010	120	13	23	36	29	–	–	–	–	–
Steve Webb	Canada	RW	1996—2004	316	5	13	18	530	14	0	0	0	28
Doug Weight	United States	C	2008—2011	107	13	51	64	73	–	–	–	–	–
Mattias Weinhandl	Sweden	RW	2002—2006	155	16	33	49	50	5	0	0	0	2
Ed Westfall	Canada	RW	1972—1979	493	105	181	286	134	45	9	20	29	12
Jason Widmer	Canada	D	1994—1996	5	0	0	0	7	–	–	–	–	–
Jason Wiemer	Canada	C	2002—2004	94	10	22	32	140	5	0	0	0	23
James Wisniewski	United States	D	2010—2011	32	3	18	21	18	–	–	–	–	–
Brendan Witt	Canada	D	2006—2010	247	5	30	35	321	5	0	1	1	6
Randy Wood	United States	C	1986—1997	381	94	78	112	294	23	3	4	7	24
Parker Wotherspoon	Canada	D	2022—2023	12	0	1	1	4	–	–	–	–	–
Alexei Yashin	Russia	C	2001—2007	346	119	171	290	179	22	5	7	12	4
Mike York	United States	LW	2005—2007	107	19	46	65	44	–	–	–	–	–
Travis Zajac	Canada	C	2020—2021	13	1	1	2	0	14	1	1	2	6
Richard Zednik	Slovakia	RW	2006—2007	10	1	2	3	2	5	0	0	0	8
Alexei Zhitnik	Russia	D	2005—2007	89	7	33	40	128	–	–	–	–	–
Marek Zidlicky	Czech Republic	D	2015—2016	53	4	12	16	20	5	0	1	1	4
Harry Zolnierczyk	Canada	LW	2014—2015	2	0	0	0	0	–	–	–	–	–

== Notes ==
- ^A Save percentage did not become an official NHL statistic until the 1982–83 season. Therefore, goaltenders who only played before 1982 do not have official save percentages.
- ^BThe "Seasons" column lists the first year of the season of the player's first game and the last year of the season of the player's last game. For example, a player who played one game in the 2000–01 season would be listed as playing with the team from 2000 to 2001, regardless of what calendar year the game occurred within.
- ^CStatistics are complete as of the end of the 2014–15 NHL season and only reflect time with the Islanders.
