= Dustin Kohn =

Canadian ice hockey player

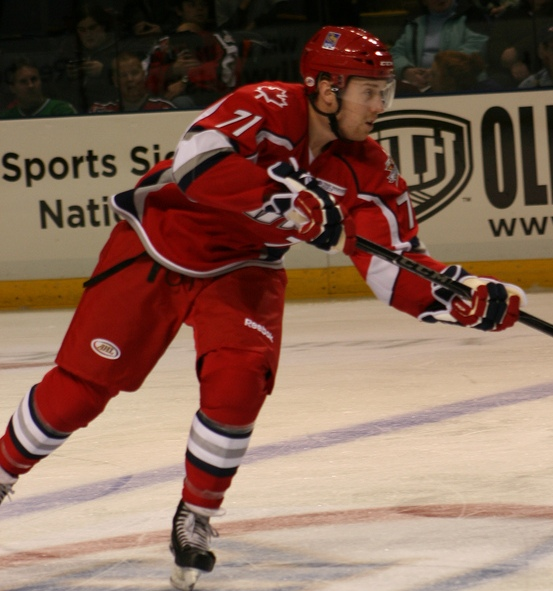
- Born: February 2, 1987 (age 39) Edmonton, Alberta, Canada
- Height: 6 ft 1 in (185 cm)
- Weight: 195 lb (88 kg; 13 st 13 lb)
- Position: Defence
- Played for: New York Islanders; Örebro HK; HC Karlovy Vary; Bridgeport Sound Tigers
- National team: Canada
- NHL draft: 46th overall, 2005; New York Islanders
- Playing career: 2006–2015

Dustin Kohn (born February 2, 1987) is a Canadian former professional ice hockey player. He is currently working for the Saskatoon Blades in the Western Hockey League as a Hockey Advisor. Previously, he was a member of the New York Islanders organization of the National Hockey League (NHL).

== Playing career ==
Kohn was born in Edmonton, Alberta, and played minor league hockey for the Knights of Columbus. He attended high school at St. Francis Xavier High School.

Dustin played Major junior hockey with the Calgary Hitmen of the Western Hockey League before he was selected in the second round, 46th overall of the 2005 NHL entry draft by the New York Islanders. In the following 2005–06 season, Kohn was traded from the Hitmen to the Brandon Wheat Kings and also made his professional debut, appearing in 2 games, after signing an amateur try-out contract with the Islanders AHL affiliate, the Bridgeport Sound Tigers.

On May 30, 2007, he was signed to a three-year entry-level contract with the New York Islanders.

Kohn was called up to the New York Islanders on January 19, 2010, and made his NHL debut following a suspension to Islanders' defenseman Andy Sutton on a boarding hit on Pittsburgh Penguins forward Pascal Dupuis.

For the 2011-2012 season, Kohn signed a one-year contract with Örebro HK in Sweden's Hockey Allsvenskan, the second highest league in the country.

After this season he remained in Europe, signing a contract with HC Energie Karlovy Vary of the Czech highest ice-hockey league, the Czech Extraliga.

On August 12, 2013, Kohn agreed to a two-year contract with United Kingdom club, the Sheffield Steelers of the EIHL.

== Career statistics ==
=== Regular season and playoffs ===
			Regular season					Playoffs
Season	Team	League	GP	G	A	Pts	PIM	GP	G	A	Pts	PIM
2003–04	Calgary Hitmen	WHL	52	3	6	9	13	7	0	1	1	2
2004–05	Calgary Hitmen	WHL	71	8	35	43	61	12	0	4	4	6
2005–06	Calgary Hitmen	WHL	38	2	12	14	20	—	—	—	—	—
2005–06	Brandon Wheat Kings	WHL	31	2	13	15	30	6	0	4	4	10
2005–06	Bridgeport Sound Tigers	AHL	2	0	0	0	0	—	—	—	—	—
2006–07	Brandon Wheat Kings	WHL	61	5	45	50	77	11	1	8	9	18
2007–08	Bridgeport Sound Tigers	AHL	62	3	9	12	28	—	—	—	—	—
2008–09	Bridgeport Sound Tigers	AHL	58	4	13	17	45	5	0	0	0	4
2009–10	Bridgeport Sound Tigers	AHL	45	2	15	17	53	5	2	2	4	2
2009–10	New York Islanders	NHL	22	0	4	4	4	—	—	—	—	—
2010–11	Bridgeport Sound Tigers	AHL	45	2	13	15	42	—	—	—	—	—
2011–12	Örebro HK	Allsv	38	0	5	5	53	8	0	0	0	2
2012–13	HC Energie Karlovy Vary	ELH	19	1	2	3	18	—	—	—	—	—
2013–14	Sheffield Steelers	EIHL	37	4	19	23	20	4	3	2	5	0
2014–15	Sheffield Steelers	EIHL	30	1	16	17	19	4	0	2	2	4
AHL totals			212	11	50	61	168	10	2	2	4	6
NHL totals			22	0	4	4	4	—	—	—	—	—

=== International ===
Year	Team	Event	GP	G	A	Pts	PIM
2004	Canada Pacific	U17	6	1	4	5	10
Junior totals			6	1	4	5	10
