= 2015–16 AHL season =

- League: American Hockey League
- Sport: Ice hockey
- Duration: October 9, 2015 – April 17, 2016
- Total attendance: 6,693,526

Regular season
- Macgregor Kilpatrick Trophy: Toronto Marlies
- Season MVP: Chris Bourque (Hershey)
- Top scorer: Chris Bourque (Hershey)

Playoffs
- Playoffs MVP: Oliver Bjorkstrand (Lake Erie)

Calder Cup
- Champions: Lake Erie Monsters
- Runners-up: Hershey Bears

AHL seasons
- 2014–15 2016–17

The 2015–16 AHL season was the 80th season of the American Hockey League. The regular season began on October 9, 2015, and ended on April 17, 2016. The 2016 Calder Cup playoffs follow the conclusion of the regular season. An attendance record was set with a league average of 5,982 spectators per game, surpassing the record set in 2004–05.

== Regular season ==
On May 12, 2015, the AHL unveiled a new, major realignment of its conferences and divisions for the 2015–16 season, a move made as a result of the relocations of seven franchises, including five teams moving to California, one to Manitoba, and one to Newfoundland and Labrador. Mirroring a change the National Hockey League had taken prior to its 2013–14 season, the AHL moved back to having four divisions of seven or eight teams. The Eastern Conference consists of the Atlantic and North Divisions, while the Western Conference consists of the Central and Pacific Divisions.

On June 13, the league commissioner, David Andrews, disclosed that the five California teams would each play 68-game schedule; the other 25 teams (including the two Texas-based teams that share the Pacific division with the California teams) would play 76 games apiece. The implementation of an unbalanced format was seen as a way to ease the California teams' travel costs as well as reducing stretches of 3 games in 3 nights, which can impede player development and hamper attractive forms of play.

To alleviate the 68/76-game imbalance, the AHL began using an alternative method of ranking its teams and determining playoff seeds. As before, standings points are still awarded (two points for a win, one point for an overtime or shootout loss, none for a regulation loss) but rather than ranking teams by the total number of points earned, they are positioned by their points percentage, determined as the number of points earned divided by points available to them. For example, a team earning one win and one overtime loss after two games would have a .750 points percentage (3 points earned divided by 4 points available).

In support of the new division, the AHL played an outdoor game called the Golden State Hockey Rush at Raley Field in West Sacramento, California on December 18, 2015. The Stockton Heat defeated the Bakersfield Condors 3–2 in front of 9,357 fans.

== Team and NHL affiliation changes ==
=== Relocations ===
Under a plan approved by the league on January 29, 2015, the league established a Pacific Division, with five teams based in the state of California. All five teams are affiliated with NHL franchises based in western North America. In the season prior to the realignment, the league had no teams west of Texas (and only one western team, the Abbotsford Heat, had played in the AHL in the five seasons prior to that), causing call-up issues for western NHL teams. In return, the three ECHL franchises already based in the cities where the AHL franchises were relocated, went east and took the place of AHL teams that had left those cities.

On March 12, 2015, the AHL announced that the True North Sports & Entertainment-owned franchise, the St. John's IceCaps, was relocating back to Winnipeg, Manitoba, to make it easier for their NHL team, the Winnipeg Jets, to call-up players. In order to fulfill their arena contract in St. John's, they negotiated with the Montreal Canadiens to move the Hamilton Bulldogs to St. John's and take on the IceCaps identity; in turn, the Bulldogs fulfilled their arena obligation by transferring their lease and intellectual property rights to the former Belleville Bulls, a junior hockey team.

The franchise changes for the 2015–16 season are listed as follows:

- The Adirondack Flames relocated to Stockton, California, to become the Stockton Heat as part of a new Pacific Division. The Calgary Flames purchased the ECHL's Stockton Thunder and relocated the team to replace the Adirondack Flames in Glens Falls as the Adirondack Thunder.
- The Hamilton Bulldogs relocated to St. John's, Newfoundland and Labrador, and took on the identity of the St. John's IceCaps. The Montreal Canadiens purchased the Bulldogs franchise from Michael Andlauer prior to the announcement of the relocation. Andlauer purchased an Ontario Hockey League franchise to replace the AHL team and gave it the same name.
- The Manchester Monarchs relocated to Ontario, California, to become the Ontario Reign as part of a new Pacific Division. The franchise swapped places with the Ontario Reign of the ECHL as both franchises were owned and operated by the Los Angeles Kings.
- The Norfolk Admirals relocated to San Diego, California, to become the San Diego Gulls as part of a new Pacific Division. The Admirals franchise was purchased by the Anaheim Ducks as their owned and operated AHL team.
- On December 18, 2014, the Oklahoma City Barons announced it would cease operations at the end of the 2014–15 season after the Barons' management failed to come to an extended affiliation agreement with their NHL affiliate and franchise owner, the Edmonton Oilers. On January 29, 2015, it was announced the franchise would establish a new team in Bakersfield, California, to become the Bakersfield Condors as part of the new Pacific Division. Unlike the Barons, the Condors are owned and operated by the Oilers organization. The Condors replaced the Oilers' ECHL team of the same name who relocated to Norfolk and took on the Norfolk Admirals identity in the ECHL.
- The franchise owned by the Winnipeg Jets that played as the St. John's IceCaps since the 2011–12 season, relocated back to Winnipeg, Manitoba, to play in the same arena as its parent club and returned to its previous identity as the Manitoba Moose.
- The Worcester Sharks relocated to San Jose, California, to become the San Jose Barracuda as part of the new Pacific Division and share the SAP Center with its parent club, the San Jose Sharks.

=== Affiliation changes ===
AHL team	New affiliate	Old affiliate
Lake Erie Monsters	Columbus Blue Jackets	Colorado Avalanche
Portland Pirates	Florida Panthers	Arizona Coyotes
San Antonio Rampage	Colorado Avalanche	Florida Panthers
Springfield Falcons	Arizona Coyotes	Columbus Blue Jackets

=== Rule changes ===
==== Overtime ====
During the regular season, the sudden-death overtime period is reduced to five minutes (5:00) in length but full playing strength is 3-on-3 (plus goaltenders) for the entire period. Overtime will be preceded by a "dry scrape" of the entire ice surface. Teams will change ends at the start of overtime. If the game is still tied following overtime, a winner will be determined by a three-player shootout.

This change mimics the change made in the National Hockey League for the 2015–16 season. In the previous season, the AHL first experimented with 3-on-3 overtime but had three minutes of 4-on-4 play before reducing the number of players on the ice. This change caused 75 percent of games tied at the end of regulation to end in overtime in the 2014–15 season. This was reduced from just 35 percent in the 2013–14 season, decreasing the number of games decided by shootout.

==== Video Review ====
A team may use a "coach's challenge" to initiate an official video review; only those situations which are subject to review by rule may be challenged. A team may only request a coach's challenge if it has its timeout available, and the coach's challenge must be effectively initiated prior to the resumption of play. If the coach's challenge does not result in the original call on the ice being overturned, the team exercising such challenge will be charged with a timeout. This change is identical to the rule change implemented by the NHL for its 2015–16 season.

==== Face-offs ====
For face-offs conducted on any of the 8 face-off dots outside center ice, the defending team's player (i.e. the player closer to his team's goal) shall place his stick on the ice first, followed immediately by the attacking team's player. For face-offs at the center ice dot, the order of stick placement shall proceed as before, with the player from the visiting team placing his stick on the ice first, followed immediately by the home team's player. This rule change mirrors one the NHL also implemented for 2015–16; previously in both leagues, the visiting team's player placed his stick on the ice first regardless of the face-off location.

== Playoff format ==
The 2016 playoff format changed as a result of the realignment and unbalanced regular season schedules. The new playoff format was finalized at the Annual Board of Governors meeting that took place July 6–9, 2015. During the regular season, teams receive two points for a win and one point for an overtime or shootout loss. The top four teams in each division ranked by points percentage (points earned divided by points available) qualify for the 2016 Calder Cup Playoffs, with one exception in each conference: if the fifth-place team in the Atlantic or Central Division finishes with a better points percentage than the fourth-place team in the North or Pacific Division, it would cross over and compete in the other division's bracket.

The 2016 Calder Cup Playoffs will feature a divisional playoff format, leading to conference finals and ultimately the Calder Cup Finals. The division semifinals are best-of-five series; all subsequent rounds are best-of-seven.

== Final standings ==
y– indicates team clinched division and a playoff spot
x– indicates team clinched a playoff spot
e– indicates team was eliminated from playoff contention

=== Eastern Conference ===
Updated as of April 17, 2016

Atlantic Division	GP	W	L	OTL	SOL	Pts	Pts%	GF	GA
y–Hershey Bears (WSH)	76	43	21	5	7	98	.645	259	220
x–Providence Bruins (BOS)	76	41	22	9	4	95	.625	238	198
x–Wilkes-Barre/Scranton Penguins (PIT)	76	43	27	4	2	92	.605	230	203
x–Portland Pirates (FLA)	76	41	27	6	2	90	.592	215	207
x–Bridgeport Sound Tigers (NYI)	76	40	29	4	3	87	.572	209	220
e–Hartford Wolf Pack (NYR)	76	41	32	3	0	85	.559	202	199
e–Lehigh Valley Phantoms (PHI)	76	34	35	4	3	75	.493	215	222
e–Springfield Falcons (ARI)	76	26	42	3	5	60	.395	194	265

North Division	GP	W	L	OTL	SOL	Pts	Pts%	GF	GA
y–Toronto Marlies (TOR)	76	54	16	5	1	114	.750	294	191
x–Albany Devils (NJD)	76	46	20	8	2	102	.671	212	167
x–Utica Comets (VAN)	76	38	26	8	4	88	.579	224	217
e–Syracuse Crunch (TBL)	76	32	29	11	4	79	.520	213	240
e–St. John's IceCaps (MTL)	76	32	33	8	3	75	.493	208	239
e–Rochester Americans (BUF)	76	34	38	3	1	72	.474	199	249
e–Binghamton Senators (OTT)	76	31	38	6	1	69	.454	204	241

=== Western Conference ===
Updated as of April 17, 2016

Central Division	GP	W	L	OTL	SOL	Pts	Pts%	GF	GA
y–Milwaukee Admirals (NSH)	76	48	23	3	2	101	.664	224	193
x–Lake Erie Monsters (CBJ)	76	43	22	6	5	97	.638	211	188
x–Rockford IceHogs (CHI)	76	40	22	10	4	94	.618	214	205
x–Grand Rapids Griffins (DET)	76	44	30	1	1	90	.592	238	195
e–Charlotte Checkers (CAR)	76	36	32	3	5	80	.526	214	229
e–Chicago Wolves (STL)	76	33	35	5	3	74	.487	194	228
e–Manitoba Moose (WPG)	76	26	41	4	5	61	.401	180	250
e–Iowa Wild (MIN)	76	24	41	5	6	59	.388	169	225

Pacific Division	GP	W	L	OTL	SOL	Pts	Pts%	GF	GA
y–Ontario Reign (LAK)	68	44	19	4	1	93	.684	192	138
x–San Diego Gulls (ANA)	68	39	23	4	2	84	.618	208	200
x–Texas Stars (DAL)	76	40	25	8	3	91	.599	277	246
x–San Jose Barracuda (SJS)	68	31	26	8	3	73	.537	198	193
e–Bakersfield Condors (EDM)	68	31	28	7	2	71	.522	212	222
e–Stockton Heat (CGY)	68	32	32	2	2	68	.500	194	224
e–San Antonio Rampage (COL)	76	33	35	8	0	74	.487	213	240

== Statistical leaders ==
=== Scoring leaders ===
The following players are sorted by points, then goals. Updated as of April 17, 2016.

GP = Games played; G = Goals; A = Assists; Pts = Points; +/– = P Plus–minus; PIM = Penalty minutes

Player	Team	GP	G	A	Pts	PIM
Chris Bourque	Hershey Bears	72	30	50	80	56
Seth Griffith	Providence Bruins	57	24	53	77	32
T. J. Brennan	Toronto Marlies	69	25	43	68	53
Alexander Khokhlachev	Providence Bruins	60	23	45	68	12
Dustin Jeffrey	Springfield/W-B/Scranton	64	20	44	64	20
Andy Miele	Grand Rapids Griffins	75	18	44	62	77
Austin Czarnik	Providence Bruins	68	20	41	61	24
Bud Holloway	St. John's IceCaps	70	19	42	61	14
Mikko Rantanen	San Antonio Rampage	52	24	36	60	42
Mark Arcobello	Toronto Marlies	49	25	34	59	22

=== Leading goaltenders ===
The following goaltenders with a minimum 1500 minutes played lead the league in goals against average. Updated as of April 16, 2016.

GP = Games played; TOI = Time on ice (in minutes); SA = Shots against; GA = Goals against; SO = Shutouts; GAA = Goals against average; SV% = Save percentage; W = Wins; L = Losses; OT = Overtime/shootout loss

Player	Team	GP	TOI	SA	GA	SO	GAA	SV%	W	L	OT
Peter Budaj	Ontario Reign	60	3574:33	1535	104	9	1.75	.932	42	14	4
Matt Murray	Wilkes-Barre/Scranton Penguins	31	1827:16	932	64	4	2.10	.931	20	9	1
Yann Danis	Albany Devils	47	2681:16	1081	99	8	2.22	.908	28	12	5
Juuse Saros	Milwaukee Admirals	38	2247:53	1052	84	4	2.24	.920	29	8	0
Dan Ellis	Hershey Bears	43	2440:28	1051	97	4	2.38	.908	25	12	5

== Calder Cup playoffs ==
Division semifinals	Division finals
A1	Hershey	3
A4	Portland	2
A1	Hershey	4
A3	W-B/Scranton	3
A2	Providence	0
A3	W-B/Scranton	3
Eastern Conference
N1	Toronto	3
A5	Bridgeport	0
N1	Toronto	4
N2	Albany	3
N2	Albany	3
N3	Utica	1
C1	Milwaukee	0
C4	Grand Rapids	3
C4	Grand Rapids	2
C2	Lake Erie	4
C2	Lake Erie	3
C3	Rockford	0
Western Conference
P1	Ontario	3
P4	San Jose	1
P1	Ontario	4
P2	San Diego	1
P2	San Diego	3
P3	Texas	1

Conference finals
A1	Hershey	4
N1	Toronto	1
C2	Lake Erie	4
P1	Ontario	0

Calder Cup final
A1	Hershey	0
C2	Lake Erie	4

== AHL awards ==
Calder Cup : Lake Erie Monsters
Les Cunningham Award : Chris Bourque, Hershey
John B. Sollenberger Trophy : Chris Bourque, Hershey
Willie Marshall Award : Frank Vatrano, Providence
Dudley "Red" Garrett Memorial Award : Mikko Rantanen, San Antonio & Frank Vatrano, Providence
Eddie Shore Award : T. J. Brennan, Toronto
Aldege "Baz" Bastien Memorial Award : Peter Budaj, Ontario
Harry "Hap" Holmes Memorial Award : Peter Budaj, Ontario
Louis A. R. Pieri Memorial Award : Rick Kowalsky, Albany
Fred T. Hunt Memorial Award : Tom Kostopoulos, Wilkes-Barre/Scranton
Yanick Dupre Memorial Award : Ryan Carpenter, San Jose
Jack A. Butterfield Trophy : Oliver Bjorkstrand, Lake Erie
Richard F. Canning Trophy : Hershey Bears
Robert W. Clarke Trophy : Lake Erie Monsters
Macgregor Kilpatrick Trophy: Toronto Marlies
Frank Mathers Trophy (Eastern Conference regular season champions): Toronto Marlies
Norman R. "Bud" Poile Trophy (Western Conference regular season champions): Ontario Reign
Emile Francis Trophy (Atlantic Division regular season champions): Hershey Bears
F. G. "Teddy" Oke Trophy (North Division regular season champions): Toronto Marlies
Sam Pollock Trophy (Central Division regular season champions): Milwaukee Admirals
John D. Chick Trophy (Pacific Division regular season champions): Ontario Reign
James C. Hendy Memorial Award: Tera Black, Charlotte
Thomas Ebright Memorial Award: Jim Schoenfeld, Hartford
James H. Ellery Memorial Awards: Patrick Williams, Manitoba
Ken McKenzie Award: Mike Peck, Rockford
Michael Condon Memorial Award: Joe Ross
President's Awards: Organization - Lake Erie; Player - Michael Leighton, Rockford

=== All-Star teams ===
First All-Star team

- Peter Budaj (G) – Ontario
- T. J. Brennan (D) – Toronto
- Brandon Montour (D) – San Diego
- Chris Bourque (F) – Hershey
- Seth Griffith (F) – Providence
- Frank Vatrano (F) – Providence

Second All-Star team

- Matt Murray (G) – Wilkes-Barre/Scranton
- Will O'Neill (D) – Wilkes-Barre/Scranton
- Robbie Russo (D) – Grand Rapids
- Dustin Jeffrey (F) – Springfield/Wilkes-Barre/Scranton
- Mikko Rantanen (F) – San Antonio
- Mike Sislo (F) – Albany

All-Rookie Team

- Juuse Saros (G) – Milwaukee
- Brandon Montour (D) – San Diego
- Robbie Russo (D) – Grand Rapids
- Austin Czarnik (F) – Providence
- Mikko Rantanen (F) – San Antonio
- Frank Vatrano (F) – Providence

== See also ==
- List of AHL seasons
- 2015 in ice hockey
- 2016 in ice hockey

Preceded by 2014–15	AHL seasons	Succeeded by 2016–17
