= A. J. Greer =

Canadian ice hockey player (born 1996)

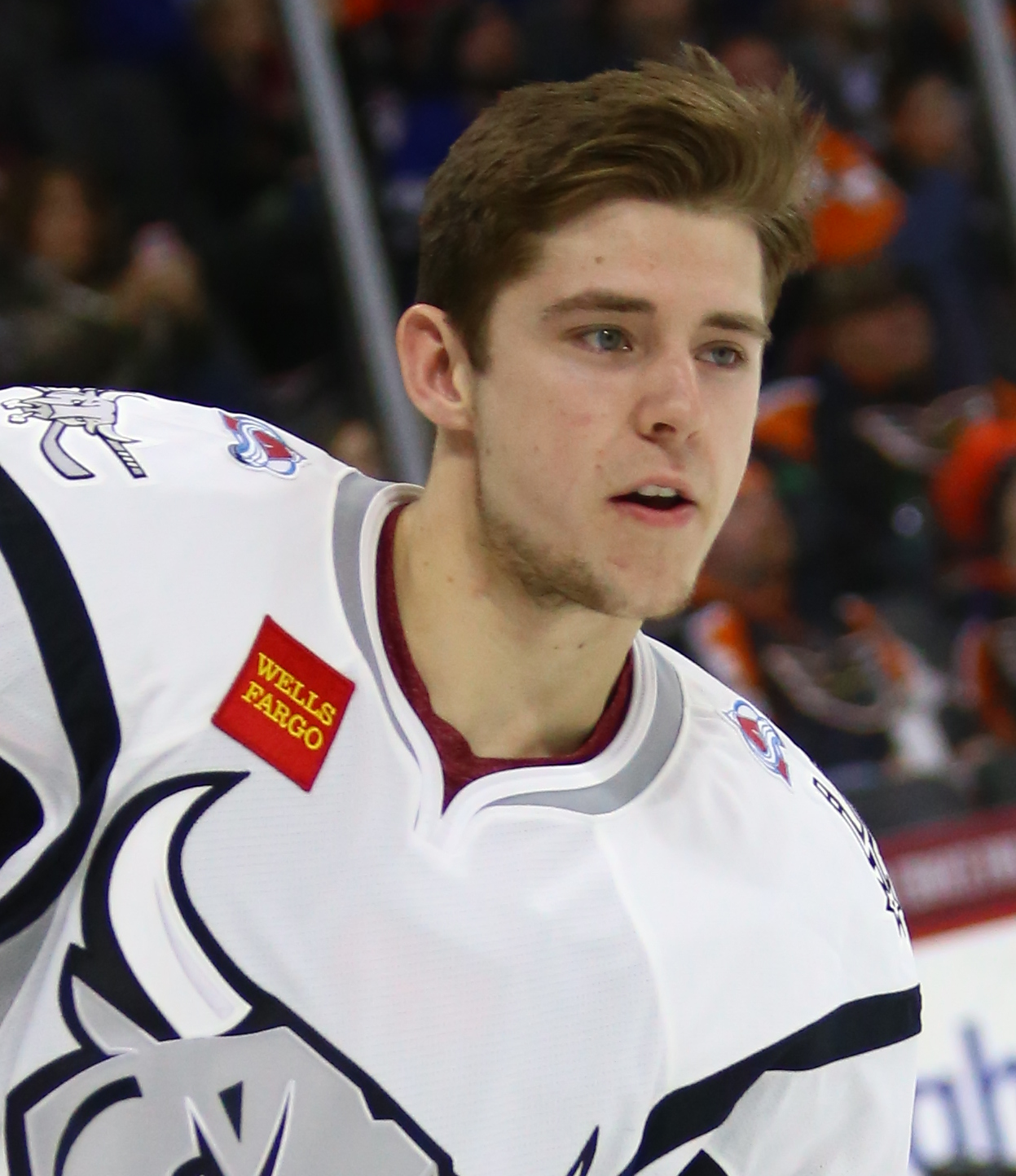
- Greer with the San Antonio Rampage in 2017
- Born: December 14, 1996 (age 29) Notre-Dame-des-Prairies, Quebec, Canada
- Height: 6 ft 3 in (191 cm)
- Weight: 224 lb (102 kg; 16 st 0 lb)
- Position: Winger
- Shoots: Left
- NHL team Former teams: Anaheim Ducks; Colorado Avalanche; New Jersey Devils; Boston Bruins; Calgary Flames; Florida Panthers
- NHL draft: 39th overall, 2015; Colorado Avalanche
- Playing career: 2016–present

Anthony-John Greer (born December 14, 1996) is a Canadian professional ice hockey player who is a winger for the Anaheim Ducks of the National Hockey League (NHL). He was selected in the second round, 39th overall, by the Colorado Avalanche in the 2015 NHL entry draft, and won the Stanley Cup with the Florida Panthers in 2025.

== Playing career ==
=== Amateur ===
Greer played minor ice hockey in West Lanaudière, and participated in the 2009 Quebec International Pee-Wee Hockey Tournament with his youth team.

Greer first played midget hockey within Quebec helping Collège Esther-Blondin Phénix to a silver medal finish in the 2012 Telus Cup. In the QMAAA, Greer contributed with 15 goals and 28 points in 42 games in the 2011–12 season, including scoring the game-winning goal to capture the Championship. He left his native Quebec to pursue a junior career in the United States, enrolling with Kimball Union Academy of New Hampshire. In his second season with Kimball, Greer captained the hockey team, and led the team in scoring with 24 goals and 63 points in 34 games. In the 2013–14 season, Greer enjoyed a brief stint in the United States Hockey League with the Des Moines Buccaneers, recording 2 goals in as many games.

Having previously committed with Boston University, Greer would begin his collegiate career on acceleration in the 2014–15 season. In his freshman year, playing as the youngest forward in the NCAA, Greer made his collegiate debut and scored a goal on October 10, 2014, against the University of Massachusetts. Initially placed in a depth forward role, Greer saw his icetime increase by seasons end, using his size and physical play earning a place on a scoring line in the post-season. Greer contributed with 3 goals and 7 points in 37 games as the Terriers finished as regular season champions and claimed the Hockey East title to clinch a Frozen Four berth.

In his sophomore year, Greer anticipated an increased role for the 2015–16 season. Unable to produce offensively and unwilling to accept reduced minutes in a checking-line role, Greer opted to leave the Terriers after 18 games to further his development in his native Quebec with the Rouyn-Noranda Huskies of the QMJHL on December 19, 2015. In joining the top ranked Huskies, Greer immediately made an impact offensively, contributing with 16 goals in the final 33 regular season games. Placed on the top scoring line in the post-season and serving as an alternate captain, Greer posted 22 points in 20 games as the Huskies captured the QMJHL Championship before losing in the Memorial Cup final.

=== Professional ===
Continuing his development path, Greer ended his brief QMJHL career to turn professional, signing a three-year, entry-level contract with the Colorado Avalanche on July 1, 2016. After attending his first training camp with the Avalanche and eligible to compete in the American Hockey League, Greer was assigned to the San Antonio Rampage. In the 2016–17 season, Greer made his professional debut with the Rampage, scoring a goal in a 2–1 defeat to the Milwaukee Admirals on October 15, 2016. Making a seamless transition to the professional level, Greer was leading the Rampage and all AHL rookies in scoring before he received his first recall to the Colorado Avalanche on November 12, 2016. He made his NHL debut with the Avalanche in a 2–0 defeat to the Boston Bruins on November 13, 2016. Following a brief return to San Antonio, Greer returned to record his first NHL point, an assist on a Mikhail Grigorenko goal, in a 3–2 loss to the Dallas Stars on November 17, 2016.

After his fifth game with the Avalanche, Greer was returned to the Rampage and continued his scoring pace, earning a rookie record with an assist in seven straight games, tying a franchise record for all skaters. He was selected alongside Spencer Martin as San Antonio's representatives at the AHL All-Star Game. As the team struggled down the stretch of the regular season, Greer appeared in 63 games for 38 points before injury concluded his rookie season. His contributions off the ice to the San Antonio community were recognized as he was awarded the Yanick Dupré Memorial Award as the AHL's Man of the Year.

Greer scored his first NHL goal on February 20, 2019, when he scored the last goal in the Avalanche's 7–1 win against the Winnipeg Jets. With 33.5 seconds left, Greer jammed the puck in against Connor Hellebuyck.

On October 19, 2019, in a game against the Milwaukee Admirals, Greer was assessed 40 minutes of penalty time and suspended for six games after he left the penalty box to fight Admirals defenseman Jarred Tinordi.

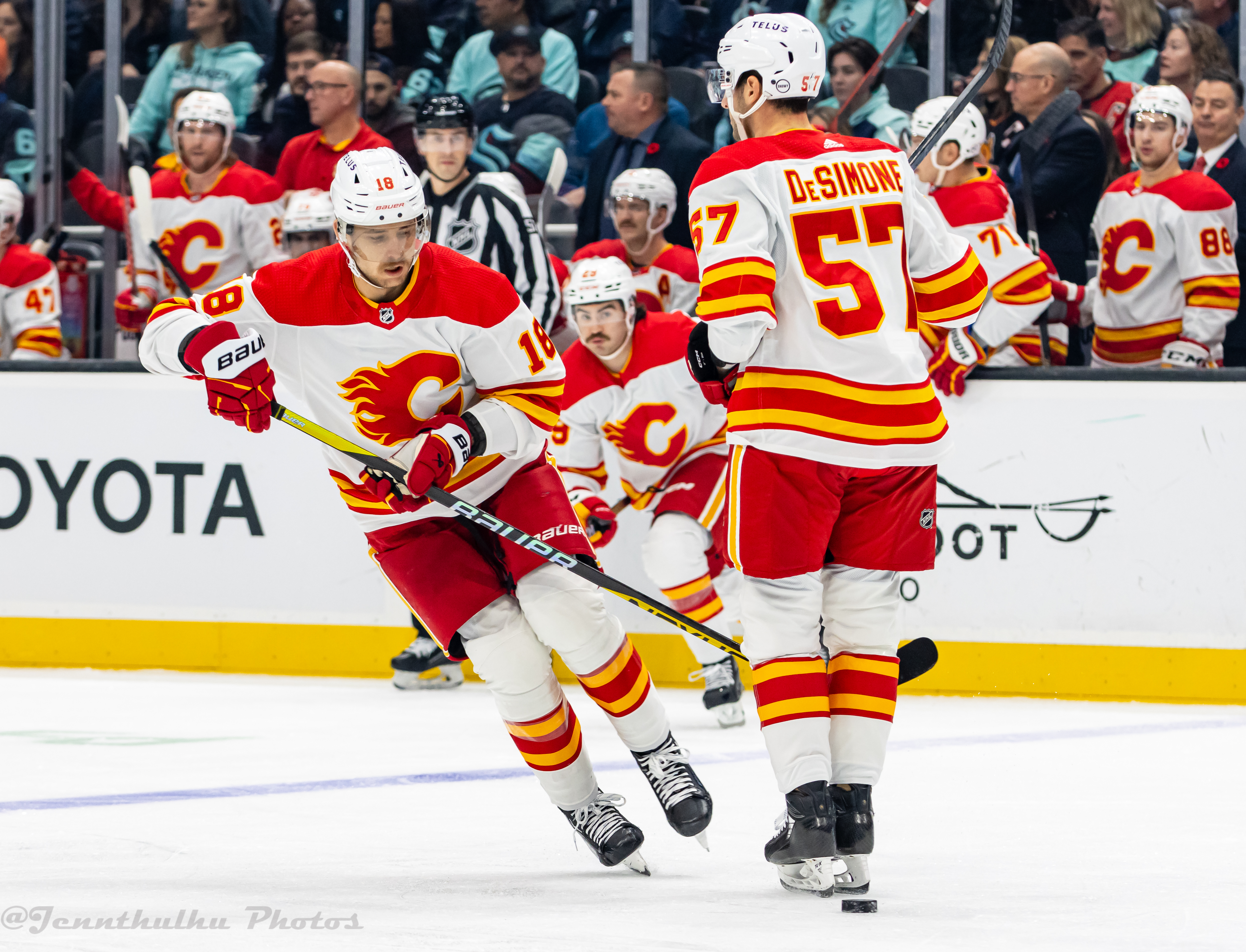
Greer as a member of the Calgary Flames in 2023

On October 11, 2020, having been unable to cement a role in the NHL with the Avalanche and looking for more opportunity, Greer was traded by Colorado to the New York Islanders in exchange for Kyle Burroughs. As a restricted free agent, Greer agreed to a one-year, two-way contract with the Islanders on October 27, 2020. In the pandemic-delayed 2020–21 season, Greer was assigned by the Islanders to AHL affiliate, the Bridgeport Sound Tigers. In a slow start to the season, Greer posted one goal and two points in 10 games with the Sound Tigers before he was traded by the Islanders, along with Mason Jobst, a 2021 first-round draft selection and a conditional 2022 fourth-round pick to the New Jersey Devils in exchange for Kyle Palmieri and Travis Zajac on April 7, 2021. He was reassigned to the AHL with the Binghamton Devils later that month.

A free agent from the Devils, Greer signed a two-year, $1.5 million contract to join the Boston Bruins on July 13, 2022.

Prior to the 2023–24 season, the Calgary Flames claimed Greer off of waivers from the Bruins on October 9, 2023. Remaining with the Flames for the duration of the season, Greer matched his career high in points, and registered a season best 6 goals and 12 points through 59 appearances.

Leaving the Flames as a free agent, on July 1, 2024 Greer was signed by the reigning Stanley Cup champion Florida Panthers to a two-year, $1.7 million contract.

As a pending free agent, Greer was traded from Florida to the Anaheim Ducks on June 29, 2026, in exchange for Radko Gudas. He was quickly signed by the Ducks to a four-year, $17 million contract extension the following day.

== Personal life ==
Greer has been very upfront about his struggles with his mental health and emphasis that seeing a sports psychologist has helped him. He has also been an advocate for the NHL's "Bell Let's Talk" program.

On July 7, 2019, Greer and then Columbus Blue Jackets forward Sonny Milano, were arrested in New York City for alleged assault. The alleged assault was reportedly over the victim demanding money after getting Greer and Milano table service at a NYC night club. Greer was not required to be present for his court date on September 4 and the charges were subsequently dropped in January 2020 after Greer and Milano paid an undisclosed amount for the victim's medical bills and completed community service.

Greer completed his Bachelor of Arts degree in Interdisciplinary Studies at Boston University in 2024.

== Career statistics ==
			Regular season					Playoffs
Season	Team	League	GP	G	A	Pts	PIM	GP	G	A	Pts	PIM
2011–12	Collège Esther-Blondin Phénix	QMAAA	42	15	13	28	75	13	7	3	10	4
2012–13	Kimball Union Academy	USHS	30	16	19	35	10	—	—	—	—	—
2013–14	Kimball Union Academy	USHS	34	24	39	63	18	—	—	—	—	—
2013–14	Des Moines Buccaneers	USHL	2	2	1	3	2	—	—	—	—	—
2014–15	Boston University	HE	37	3	4	7	18	—	—	—	—	—
2015–16	Boston University	HE	18	1	4	5	10	—	—	—	—	—
2015–16	Rouyn-Noranda Huskies	QMJHL	33	16	11	27	57	20	12	10	22	28
2016–17	San Antonio Rampage	AHL	63	15	23	38	78	—	—	—	—	—
2016–17	Colorado Avalanche	NHL	5	0	1	1	4	—	—	—	—	—
2017–18	San Antonio Rampage	AHL	35	8	5	13	34	—	—	—	—	—
2017–18	Colorado Avalanche	NHL	17	0	3	3	29	—	—	—	—	—
2018–19	Colorado Eagles	AHL	54	19	25	44	63	4	0	3	3	9
2018–19	Colorado Avalanche	NHL	15	1	1	2	14	—	—	—	—	—
2019–20	Colorado Eagles	AHL	47	16	16	32	87	—	—	—	—	—
2020–21	Bridgeport Sound Tigers	AHL	10	1	1	2	8	—	—	—	—	—
2020–21	Binghamton Devils	AHL	16	4	10	14	8	—	—	—	—	—
2020–21	New Jersey Devils	NHL	1	0	0	0	7	—	—	—	—	—
2021–22	Utica Comets	AHL	53	22	30	52	102	5	6	2	8	2
2021–22	New Jersey Devils	NHL	9	1	1	2	2	—	—	—	—	—
2022–23	Boston Bruins	NHL	61	5	7	12	114	—	—	—	—	—
2023–24	Calgary Flames	NHL	59	6	6	12	35	—	—	—	—	—
2024–25	Florida Panthers	NHL	81	6	11	17	130	16	2	1	3	22
2025–26	Florida Panthers	NHL	78	17	15	32	113	—	—	—	—	—
NHL totals			326	36	45	81	448	16	2	1	3	22

== Awards and honours ==
Award	Year	Ref
AHL
All-Star Game	2017	
Yanick Dupre Memorial Award	2017	
NHL
Stanley Cup champion	2025	
