= Donald MacLean (ice hockey) =

Canadian ice hockey player (born 1977

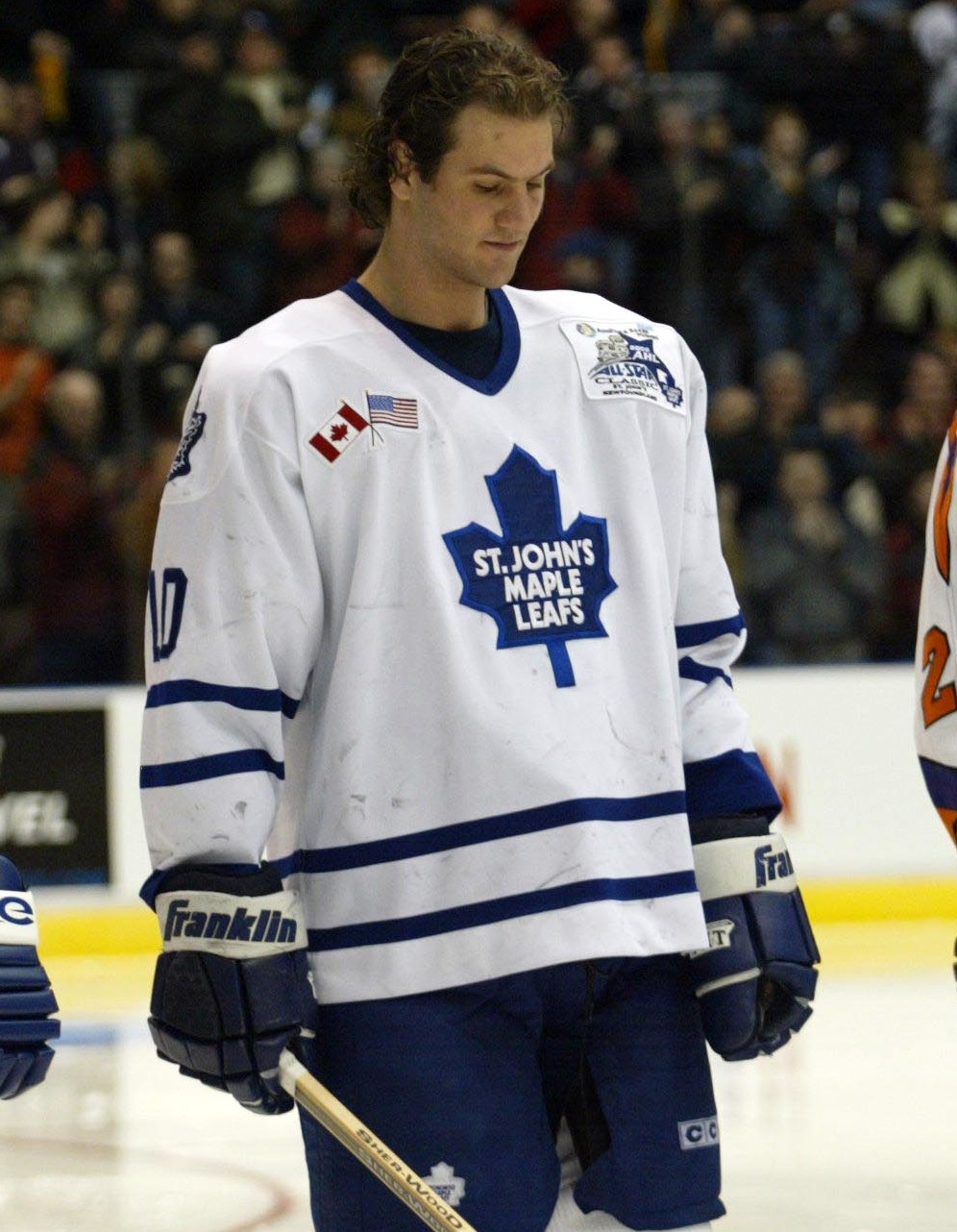
- MacLean with the St. John's Maple Leafs in 2002
- Born: January 14, 1977 (age 49) Sydney, Nova Scotia, Canada
- Height: 6 ft 2 in (188 cm)
- Weight: 199 lb (90 kg; 14 st 3 lb)
- Position: Centre
- Shot: Left
- Played for: Los Angeles Kings; Toronto Maple Leafs; Columbus Blue Jackets; Blues; Detroit Red Wings; Phoenix Coyotes; ZSC Lions; EC Salzburg; Rødovre Mighty Bulls; KHL Medveščak
- NHL draft: 33rd overall, 1995; Los Angeles Kings
- Playing career: 1997–2011

Donald MacLean (born January 14, 1977) is a Canadian ice hockey coach and former professional player. He was an assistant coach for the Sault Ste. Marie Greyhounds of the Ontario Hockey League (OHL). MacLean played in the National Hockey League (NHL) with the Los Angeles Kings, Toronto Maple Leafs, Columbus Blue Jackets, Detroit Red Wings and the Phoenix Coyotes.

== Playing career ==
As a youth, MacLean played in the 1990 and 1991 Quebec International Pee-Wee Hockey Tournaments with a minor ice hockey team from Bedford, Nova Scotia.

MacLean was selected 33rd overall in the 1995 NHL entry draft by the Los Angeles Kings. MacLean spent three years playing junior hockey in the Quebec Major Junior Hockey League. In his second year he tallied 89 points in 61 games playing for three different teams (Beauport Harfangs, Laval Titan Collège Français and Hull Olympiques). His NHL debut was in Los Angeles in the 1997–1998 season where he played 22 games notching five goals and two assists.

On February 23, 2000, MacLean was traded by the Kings to the Toronto Maple Leafs for Craig Charron. MacLean spent the majority of his contract with the Leafs in the minors with the St. John's Maple Leafs of the American Hockey League. After finishing the 2001–02 as the AHL leading scorer, MacLean made his NHL play-off debut with the Leafs, playing in 3 games. On July 17, 2002, MacLean signed as a free agent with the Columbus Blue Jackets and appeared in four regular season games.

On August 24, 2005, MacLean was signed by the Detroit Red Wings. In his first game as a Red Wing, MacLean opened the scoring against the Edmonton Oilers on an assist from Niklas Kronwall with a man-advantage. The Red Wings would eventually shut out the Oilers and MacLean was credited with the game-winning goal.

In the AHL, playing for the Red Wings affiliate Grand Rapids Griffins, MacLean recorded a point in 19 straight games between January 6 and February 18, 2006. This was the longest point streak for any AHL player in the 2005–06 season. The same year, MacLean scored five hat-tricks, the most by an AHL player since 2000. He participated in the 2006 Rbk Hockey AHL All-Star Classic with fellow Griffins Jiri Hudler and Valtteri Filppula, scoring two goals for the Canadian team. He also won the Hardest Shot event in the Skills Competition. MacLean finished the season as the league MVP and leading goal-scorer.

MacLean signed as a free agent to a two-year contract with the Phoenix Coyotes on July 17, 2006, where he would primarily play for the San Antonio Rampage of the AHL.

Maclean left the final year of his contract with the Coyotes and signed with Swiss team ZSC Lions on July 16, 2007, he however left for Austria on December 9, 2007, signing with EC Salzburg. Maclean then went on to help Salzburg win the EBEL league. Following a short stint in the Oddset Ligaen with the Rødovre Mighty Bulls MacLean then transferred midway through the 2008–09 season to the Swedish HockeyAllsvenskan with the Malmö Redhawks. MacLean veteran experience helped him lead the Redhawks with 30 points in 38 games. After signing a contract extension with Malmö for the 2009–10 season, MacLean scored a further 16 goals in 42 games.

On August 18, 2010, MacLean agreed to a trial to the return to the EBEL with Croatian team, KHL Medveščak. After impressing in two weeks of training, MacLean was officially signed on a one-year contract on September 1, 2010.

== Coaching career ==
On June 29, 2015, MacLean was named assistant coach for the Sault Ste. Marie Greyhounds of the Ontario Hockey League and remained in that position until 2020.

== Career statistics ==
			Regular season					Playoffs
Season	Team	League	GP	G	A	Pts	PIM	GP	G	A	Pts	PIM
1992–93	Halifax Hawks AAA	Midget	27	15	25	40	34	—	—	—	—	—
1993–94	Halifax Hawks AAA	Midget	25	35	35	70	151	—	—	—	—	—
1994–95	Beauport Harfangs	QMJHL	64	15	27	42	37	17	4	4	8	6
1995–96	Beauport Harfangs	QMJHL	1	0	1	1	0	—	—	—	—	—
1995–96	Laval Titan Collège Français	QMJHL	21	17	11	28	29	—	—	—	—	—
1995–96	Hull Olympiques	QMJHL	39	26	34	60	44	17	6	7	13	14
1996–97	Hull Olympiques	QMJHL	69	34	47	81	67	14	11	10	21	29
1996–97	Hull Olympiques	MC	—	—	—	—	—	4	4	6	10	6
1997–98	Fredericton Canadiens	AHL	39	9	5	14	32	4	1	3	4	2
1997–98	Los Angeles Kings	NHL	22	5	2	7	4	—	—	—	—	—
1998–99	Springfield Falcons	AHL	41	5	14	19	31	—	—	—	—	—
1998–99	Grand Rapids Griffins	IHL	28	6	13	19	8	—	—	—	—	—
1999–2000	Lowell Lock Monsters	AHL	40	11	17	28	18	—	—	—	—	—
1999–2000	St. John's Maple Leafs	AHL	21	14	12	26	8	—	—	—	—	—
2000–01	St. John's Maple Leafs	AHL	61	26	34	60	48	4	2	1	3	2
2000–01	Toronto Maple Leafs	NHL	3	0	1	1	2	—	—	—	—	—
2001–02	St. John's Maple Leafs	AHL	75	33	54	87	49	9	5	5	10	6
2001–02	Toronto Maple Leafs	NHL	—	—	—	—	—	3	0	0	0	0
2002–03	Syracuse Crunch	AHL	17	9	9	18	6	—	—	—	—	—
2003–04	Columbus Blue Jackets	NHL	4	1	0	1	0	—	—	—	—	—
2003–04	Syracuse Crunch	AHL	77	27	41	68	45	7	0	3	3	4
2004–05	Blues	SM-l	51	22	21	43	46	—	—	—	—	—
2005–06	Grand Rapids Griffins	AHL	76	56	32	88	63	14	6	2	8	8
2005–06	Detroit Red Wings	NHL	3	1	1	2	0	—	—	—	—	—
2006–07	San Antonio Rampage	AHL	66	33	28	61	51	—	—	—	—	—
2006–07	Phoenix Coyotes	NHL	9	1	1	2	0	—	—	—	—	—
2007–08	ZSC Lions	NLA	11	4	1	5	16	—	—	—	—	—
2007–08	EC Salzburg	AUT	13	13	7	20	8	14	8	5	13	30
2008–09	Rødovre Mighty Bulls	DEN	7	0	3	3	0	—	—	—	—	—
2008–09	Rødovre SIK	DEN.2	2	1	1	2	0	—	—	—	—	—
2008–09	Malmö Redhawks	Allsv	38	15	15	30	18	—	—	—	—	—
2009–10	Malmö Redhawks	Allsv	42	16	13	29	4	5	1	1	2	0
2010–11	KHL Medveščak Zagreb	AUT	43	8	14	22	24	5	1	1	2	8
2010–11	KHL Medveščak Zagreb II	CRO	—	—	—	—	—	3	6	2	8	0
AHL totals			513	223	246	469	351	38	14	14	28	22
NHL totals			41	8	5	13	6	3	0	0	0	0

== Awards and honours ==
Award	Year
AHL
All-Star Game	2002, 2006
John B. Sollenberger Trophy	2001–02
First All-Star Team	2005–06
Willie Marshall Award	2005–06
Les Cunningham Award	2005–06
