= Aldege "Baz" Bastien Memorial Award =

American Hockey League Award

The Aldege "Baz" Bastien Memorial Award is presented annually to the American Hockey League's best goaltender. The award winner is chosen by AHL media and players.

The award is named after former AHL Pittsburgh Hornets goaltender Aldege "Baz" Bastien, the first winner (1947–48) and first repeat winner (1948–49) of the Harry "Hap" Holmes Memorial Award as goaltender of the AHL team with the lowest goals against average; he later served as general manager of the National Hockey League's Pittsburgh Penguins.

== Winners ==
Season	Player	Team
1983–84	Brian Ford	Fredericton Express
1984–85	Jon Casey	Baltimore Skipjacks
1985–86	Sam St. Laurent	Maine Mariners
1986–87	Mark Laforest (1)	Adirondack Red Wings
1987–88	Wendell Young	Hershey Bears
1988–89	Randy Exelby	Sherbrooke Canadiens
1989–90	Jean-Claude Bergeron	Sherbrooke Canadiens
1990–91	Mark Laforest (2)	Binghamton Rangers
1991–92	Felix Potvin	St. John's Maple Leafs
1992–93	Corey Hirsch	Binghamton Rangers
1993–94	Frederic Chabot	Hershey Bears
1994–95	Jim Carey	Portland Pirates
1995–96	Manny Legace	Springfield Falcons
1996–97	Jean-Francois Labbe	Hershey Bears
1997–98	Scott Langkow	Springfield Falcons
1998–99	Martin Biron	Rochester Americans
1999–00	Martin Brochu	Portland Pirates
2000–01	Dwayne Roloson	Worcester IceCats
2001–02	Martin Prusek	Grand Rapids Griffins
2002–03	Marc Lamothe	Grand Rapids Griffins
2003–04	Jason LaBarbera (1)	Hartford Wolf Pack
2004–05	Ryan Miller	Rochester Americans
2005–06	Dany Sabourin	Wilkes-Barre/Scranton Penguins
2006–07	Jason LaBarbera (2)	Manchester Monarchs
2007–08	Michael Leighton	Albany River Rats
2008–09	Cory Schneider	Manitoba Moose
2009–10	Jonathan Bernier	Manchester Monarchs
2010–11	Brad Thiessen	Wilkes-Barre/Scranton Penguins
2011–12	Yann Danis	Oklahoma City Barons
2012–13	Niklas Svedberg	Providence Bruins
2013–14	Jake Allen	Chicago Wolves
2014–15	Matt Murray	Wilkes-Barre/Scranton Penguins
2015–16	Peter Budaj	Ontario Reign
2016–17	Troy Grosenick	San Jose Barracuda
2017–18	Garret Sparks	Toronto Marlies
2018–19	Alex Nedeljkovic	Charlotte Checkers
2019–20	Kaapo Kahkonen	Iowa Wild
2020–21	Logan Thompson	Henderson Silver Knights
2021–22	Dustin Wolf (1)	Stockton Heat
2022–23	Dustin Wolf (2)	Calgary Wranglers
2023–24	Hunter Shepard	Hershey Bears
2024–25	Michael DiPietro (1)	Providence Bruins
2025–26	Michael DiPietro (2)	Providence Bruins
