= Ken McKenzie Award =

Award in American Hockey League

The Ken McKenzie Award is presented annually to an individual who accomplished the most during the season in promoting their American Hockey League team, by marketing and public relations. The award is named for Ken McKenzie, the co-founder and longtime president and publisher of The Hockey News.

== Winners ==
Season	Recipient	Team
1977–78	Mike Emrick	Maine Mariners
1978–79	Roy Mlakar	New Haven Nighthawks
1979–80	Bruce Landon	Springfield Indians
1980–81	Brent Hancock	Hershey Bears
1981–82	Rick Peckham	Rochester Americans
1982–83	Mike Doyle	Fredericton Express
1983–84	Dave Strader	Adirondack Red Wings
1984–85	Dale Arnold	Maine Mariners
1985–86	Randy Scott	Rochester Americans
1986–87	Larry Haley	Moncton Golden Flames
1987–88	Doug Yingst	Hershey Bears
1988–89	John Forslund	Springfield Indians
1989–90	Don Ostrom	Adirondack Red Wings
1990–91	Jan MacDonald	New Haven Nighthawks
1991–92	Russ Newton	Fredericton Canadiens
1992–93	Catherine Galea	Hamilton Canucks
1992–93	Jason Siegel	Binghamton Rangers
1993–94	Jeremy Duncan	Albany River Rats
1994–95	Tim Kuhl	Syracuse Crunch
1995–96	Tim Kuhl	Syracuse Crunch
1996–97	Glenn Stanford	St. John's Maple Leafs
1996–97	Carole Appleton	Springfield Falcons
1997–98	Chris Palin	Rochester Americans
1998–99	Cary Kaplan	Hamilton Bulldogs
1999–00	Brian Magness	Wilkes-Barre/Scranton Penguins
1999–00	Rich Hixon	Wilkes-Barre/Scranton Penguins
2000–01	Dave Cieslinski	Rochester Americans
2001–02	Jim Sarosy	Syracuse Crunch
2002–03	Don Helbig	Cincinnati Mighty Ducks
2003–04	Chris Schwartz	St. John's Maple Leafs
2004–05	Brian Lewis	Hamilton Bulldogs
2005–06	Mike Wojciechowski	Milwaukee Admirals
2006–07	Randy Cleves	Grand Rapids Griffins
2007–08	Norva Riddell	Manitoba Moose
2008–09	Courtney Mahoney	Chicago Wolves
2009–10	Jim Sarosy	Syracuse Crunch
2010–11	Mike Cosentino	Toronto Marlies
2011–12	Mike Lappan	Charlotte Checkers
2013–14	Charlie Larson	Milwaukee Admirals
2014–15	Brian Coe	Wilkes-Barre/Scranton Penguins
2015–16	Mike Peck	Rockford IceHogs
2016–17	Marc Lira	Toronto Marlies
2017–18	Pam Frasco	Cleveland Monsters
2018–19	Paul Branecky	Charlotte Checkers
2019–20	Allie Brown	Iowa Wild
2020–21	Zack Fisch	Hershey Bears
2021–22	Gavin Riches	Colorado Eagles
2022–23	Sebastien Vaillant	Laval Rocket
