= John D. Chick Trophy =

US ice hockey award

- Sport: Ice hockey
- Awarded for: Pacific Division champions of the American Hockey League

History
- First award: 1961–62 AHL season
- Most recent: Ontario Reign

The John D. Chick Trophy is presented annually to the American Hockey League team that has the best record in the Pacific Division.

The award is named after John D. Chick, who served as vice president and treasurer of the American Hockey League.

Previously the trophy was awarded to the Western Division from 1962 to 1973, the Southern Division from 1974 to 1995, the Central and Empire Divisions from 1996 to 2003, the South Division in 2013, and the West Division in 2004–2012 and 2014–2015.

== Winners ==
Total awards won
Wins	Team
11	Rochester Americans
5	Hershey Bears
4	Milwaukee Admirals
3	Baltimore Clippers
3	Binghamton Rangers
3	Buffalo Bisons
3	Chicago Wolves
2	Albany River Rats
2	Bakersfield Condors
2	Binghamton Whalers
2	New Haven Nighthawks
2	Ontario Reign
2	Pittsburgh Hornets
2	Texas Stars
2	Tucson Roadrunners
1	Adirondack Red Wings
1	Baltimore Skipjacks
1	Calgary Wranglers
1	Cincinnati Swords
1	Cleveland Barons
1	Coachella Valley Firebirds
1	Colorado Eagles
1	Grand Rapids Griffins
1	Kentucky Thoroughblades
1	Oklahoma City Barons
1	Omaha Ak-Sar-Ben Knights
1	San Antonio Rampage
1	San Jose Barracuda
1	Stockton Heat
1	Syracuse Crunch
1	Virginia Wings

=== Winner by season ===
Key

- ‡ = Eventual Calder Cup champions

Awarded for	Season	Team	Win
West Division champions	1961–62	Cleveland Barons	1
West Division champions	1962–63	Buffalo Bisons‡	1
West Division champions	1963–64	Pittsburgh Hornets	1
West Division champions	1964–65	Rochester Americans‡	1
West Division champions	1965–66	Rochester Americans‡	2
West Division champions	1966–67	Pittsburgh Hornets‡	2
West Division champions	1967–68	Rochester Americans‡	3
West Division champions	1968–69	Buffalo Bisons	2
West Division champions	1969–70	Buffalo Bisons‡	3
West Division champions	1970–71	Baltimore Clippers	1
West Division champions	1971–72	Baltimore Clippers	2
West Division champions	1972–73	Cincinnati Swords‡	1
South Division champions	1973–74	Baltimore Clippers	3
South Division champions	1974–75	Virginia Wings	1
South Division champions	1975–76	Hershey Bears	1
South Division champions	1976–77	Not awarded	—
South Division champions	1977–78	Rochester Americans	4
South Division champions	1978–79	New Haven Nighthawks	1
South Division champions	1979–80	New Haven Nighthawks	2
South Division champions	1980–81	Hershey Bears	2
South Division champions	1981–82	Binghamton Whalers	1
South Division champions	1982–83	Rochester Americans‡	5
South Division champions	1983–84	Baltimore Skipjacks	1
South Division champions	1984–85	Binghamton Whalers	2
South Division champions	1985–86	Hershey Bears	3
South Division champions	1986–87	Rochester Americans‡	6
South Division champions	1987–88	Hershey Bears‡	4
South Division champions	1988–89	Adirondack Red Wings‡	1
South Division champions	1989–90	Rochester Americans	7
South Division champions	1990–91	Rochester Americans	8
South Division champions	1991–92	Binghamton Rangers	1
South Division champions	1992–93	Binghamton Rangers	2
South Division champions	1993–94	Hershey Bears	5
South Division champions	1994–95	Binghamton Rangers	3
Central Division champions	1995–96	Albany River Rats	1
Empire State Division champions	1996–97	Rochester Americans	9
Empire State Division champions	1997–98	Albany River Rats	2
Empire State Division champions	1998–99	Rochester Americans	10
Empire State Division champions	1999–00	Rochester Americans	11
South Division champions	2000–01	Kentucky Thoroughblades	1
Central Division champions	2001–02	Syracuse Crunch	1
Central Division champions	2002–03	Grand Rapids Griffins	1
West Division champions	2003–04	Milwaukee Admirals‡	1
West Division champions	2004–05	Chicago Wolves	1
West Division champions	2005–06	Milwaukee Admirals	2
West Division champions	2006–07	Omaha Ak-Sar-Ben Knights	1
West Division champions	2007–08	Chicago Wolves‡	2
West Division champions	2008–09	Milwaukee Admirals	3
West Division champions	2009–10	Chicago Wolves	3
West Division champions	2010–11	Milwaukee Admirals	4
West Division champions	2011–12	Oklahoma City Barons	1
South Division champions	2012–13	Texas Stars	1
West Division champions	2013–14	Texas Stars‡	2
West Division champions	2014–15	San Antonio Rampage	1
Pacific Division champions	2015–16	Ontario Reign	1
Pacific Division champions	2016–17	San Jose Barracuda	1
Pacific Division champions	2017–18	Tucson Roadrunners	1
Pacific Division champions	2018–19	Bakersfield Condors	1
Pacific Division champions	2019–20	Tucson Roadrunners	2
Pacific Division tournament champions	2020–21	Bakersfield Condors	2
Pacific Division champions	2021–22	Stockton Heat	1
Pacific Division champions	2022–23	Calgary Wranglers	1
Pacific Division champions	2023–24	Coachella Valley Firebirds	1
Pacific Division champions	2024–25	Colorado Eagles	1
Pacific Division champions	2025–26	Ontario Reign	2
