= James H. Ellery Memorial Awards =

News awards in American Hockey League

The James H. Ellery Memorial Awards are presented annually to the individuals of the news media for outstanding media coverage of the American Hockey League. The awards are given in memory James Ellery, former publicity director for the AHL. The first award was handed out to one individual in 1965. From 1976 to 2013, three awards were given, one to each for newspaper, radio and television. In 2014, the AHL began awarding only one award for general media coverage.

== Winners (2014–present) ==
Season	Recipient
2013–14	Dan Weiss, San Antonio
2014–15	Brendan Burke, Utica
2015–16	Patrick Williams, NHL.com
2016–17	Service Electric 2 Sports, Lehigh Valley
2017–18	Ben Birnell, Utica
2018–19	Mike Griffith, Bakersfield
2019–20	Larry Figurski, Grand Rapids
2020–21	Tony Brown, Cleveland
2021–22	Scott Leber, Rockford
2022–23	WPMT-TV FOX43, Hershey
2023–24	Daniel Fink, Manitoba
2024–25	Gino LaMont, Coachella Valley

== Winners (1976–2013) ==
=== Newspaper ===
Season	Recipient
1975–76	Clayton Campbell, Nova Scotia
1976–77	Steve Summers, Hershey
1976–77	Bruce Whitman, Hershey
1977–78	Brian Thayer, Maine
1978–79	Eddie St. Pierre, Moncton
1979–80	Paul Marslano, New Haven
1980–81	Rick Wheeler, Rochester
1981–82	Barry Meisel, Binghamton
1982–83	Mike Kane, Adirondack
1983–84	Jack Gatecliff, St. Catharines
1984–85	Jerry Crasnick, Maine
1985–86	Jerry Crasnick, Maine
1986–87	Joel Jacobson, Nova Scotia
1987–88	Mike Kane, Adirondack
1988–89	Paul Abramowitz, Maine
1989–90	Mike Kane, Adirondack
1990–91	Bob Dittmeier, Adirondack / Capital District
1991–92	Jim Jackson, Baltimore
1992–93	Kevin Oklobzija, Rochester
1993–94	Dan Sernoffsky, Hershey
1994–95	Bill Hunt, Fredericton
1995–96	Kevin Oklobzija, Rochester
1996–97	Lindsay Kramer, Syracuse
1997–98	Brendan McCarthy, St. John's
1997–98	Bill Ballou, Worcester
1998–99	Phil Janack, Albany
1999–00	Dave Sottile, Hershey
2000–01	Tris Wykes, Norfolk
2001–02	Garry McKay, Hamilton
2002–03	Joe Conklin, Grand Rapids
2003–04	Mike Fornabaio, Bridgeport
2004–05	Jonathan Bombulie, Wilkes-Barre/Scranton
2005–06	Phil Janack, Albany
2006–07	Bill Ballou, Worcester
2007–08	Lindsay Kramer, Syracuse
2008–09	Winnipeg Free Press
2009–10	Pete Dougherty, Albany
2010–11	Tim Leone, Hershey
2011–12	Dave Eminian, Peoria
2012–13	The Telegram, St. John's

=== Radio ===
Season	Recipient
1975–76	Arnie Patterson, Nova Scotia
1976–77	Leo MacIsaac, Nova Scotia
1977–78	Al Kalter, Binghamton
1977–78	Al Kalter, Binghamton
1978–79	Arnie Patterson, Nova Scotia
1979–80	Bill Brady, Springfield
1980–81	Russ Small, Hershey
1981–82	Dave Morell, Fredericton
1982–83	Phil Wood, Baltimore
1983–84	Tom George, Rochester
1984–85	Roger Neel, Binghamton
1985–86	Jim Gagliardi, Adirondack
1986–87	Dave Morell, Fredericton
1987–88	Jeff Rimer, Baltimore
1988–89	Pat Connolly, Cape Breton
1989–90	Ron Rohmer, New Haven
1990–91	Bob Matthews, Rochester
1991–92	Dave LeBlanc, Cape Breton
1992–93	John Colletto, Providence
1993–94	Don Stevens, Rochester
1994–95	John Colletto, Providence
1995–96	Seth Everett, Syracuse
1996–97	Aaron Kennedy, Saint John
1997–98	Lance McAllister, Cincinnati
1998–99	Tim Woodburn, Kentucky
1999–00	Greg Waddell, Cincinnati
2000–01	Bob Crawford, Hartford
2001–02	Tom Grace, Wilkes-Barre/Scranton
2002–03	Dave Ahlers, Portland
2003–04	John Walton, Hershey
2004–05	Derek Wills, Hamilton
2005–06	Kelly Moore, Manitoba
2006–07	John Bartlett, Toronto
2007–08	Ken Cail, Manchester
2008–09	NHL Home Ice on XM Satellite Radio
2009–10	Bob Kaser, Grand Rapids
2010–11	Grady Whittenburg, Binghamton
2011–12	Pete Michaud, Norfolk
2012–13	Don Stevens, Rochester

=== Television ===
Season	Recipient
1975–76	Dick Galiette, New Haven
1976–77	Rich Funke, Rochester
1977–78	Tim Melton, Hershey
1977–78	Frank Fixaris, Maine
1978–79	Jack O'Neil, Springfield
1979–80	Dale Darling, Maine
1980–81	Simeon Smith, Rochester
1981–82	John Logan, Moncton
1982–83	Tom Gagnon, Rochester
1983–84	Vince Bagli, Baltimore
1984–85	Phil Smith, Rochester
1985–86	Rich Funke, Rochester
1986–87	Arnold Klinsky, Rochester
1987–88	Frank Chiano, Rochester
1988–89	Brian Lambert, Springfield
1989–90	Pyman Productions
1990–91	Jimmy Young, Maine
1990–91	Tom Caron, Maine
1991–92	Ken Harris, Binghamton
1992–93	Pyman Productions
1993–94	Cable Atlantic, St. John's
1994–95	Adam Benigni, Syracuse
1995–96	Tom Caron, New England Sports Network
1996–97	Jim Ogle, Kentucky
1997–98	Rich Coppola, Hartford / New Haven
1998–99	Cable Atlantic, St. John's
1999–00	WBRE-TV 28, Wilkes-Barre/Scranton
2000–01	Fox Sports Net, Pittsburgh
2001–02	WOOD-TV 8, Grand Rapids
2002–03	Rogers Sportsnet
2003–04	Comcast Cable, Chicago
2004–05	Brendan O'Reilly, Binghamton
2005–06	Gregg Mace, Hershey
2006–07	Mark Giangreco, Chicago
2007–08	Tim Doty, Grand Rapids
2008–09	Kevin Shea, Worcester
2009–10	Tony Zarrella, Cleveland
2010–11	Jamie Staton, Manchester
2011–12	Aaron LaFontaine, Toronto
2012–13	Sportsnet

== Early winners (1965–1975) ==
Season	Recipient
1964–65	Charlie Barton, Buffalo
1965–66	Hans Tanner, Rochester
1966–67	Roland Sabourin, Quebec
1967–68	Jim West, Baltimore
1968–69	John Travers, Hershey
1969–70	Les Sterns, Springfield
1970–71	W.W. "Tiny" Parry, Hershey
1971–72	Al Fischer, Baltimore
1972–73	Jerry Linquist, Baltimore
1973–74	George Taylor, Baltimore
1974–75	Ron Rohmer, New Haven
