= 2005–06 AHL season =

- League: American Hockey League
- Sport: Ice hockey
- Duration: October 5, 2005 - April 16, 2006

Regular season
- Macgregor Kilpatrick Trophy: Grand Rapids Griffins
- Season MVP: Donald MacLean
- Top scorer: Kirby Law

Playoffs
- Playoffs MVP: Frederic Cassivi

Calder Cup
- Champions: Hershey Bears
- Runners-up: Milwaukee Admirals

AHL seasons
- 2004–05 2006–07

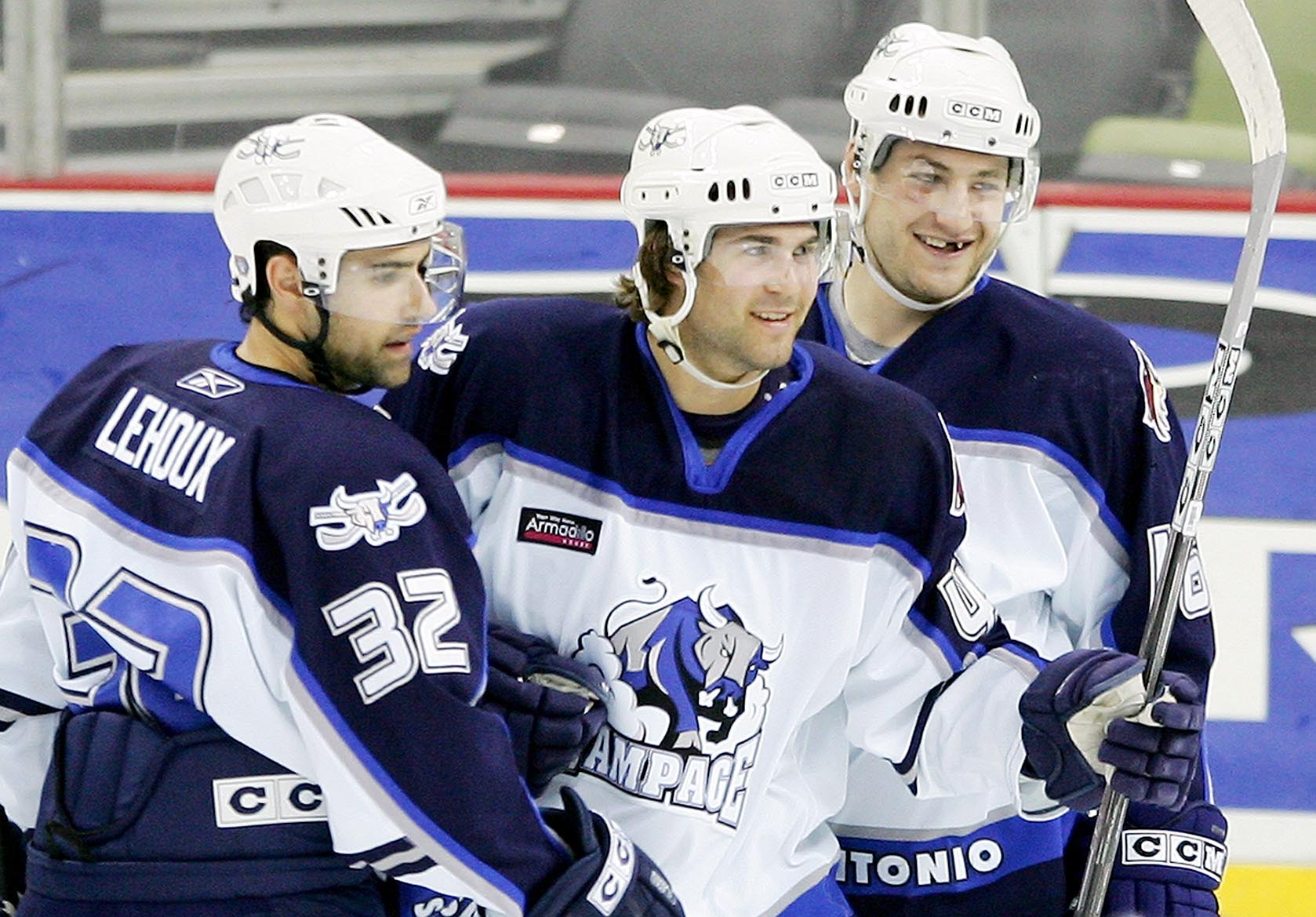
Daniel Winnik in 2006

The 2005–06 AHL season was the 70th season of the American Hockey League. Twenty-seven teams played 80 games each in the schedule. The Hershey Bears won the Calder Cup, defeating the Milwaukee Admirals in the finals.

To celebrate the AHL's 70th anniversary, the league announced on January 6, 2006, the first inductees into the AHL's new Hall of Fame . The first inductees were; Johnny Bower, Jack Butterfield, Jody Gage, Fred Glover, Willie Marshall, Frank Mathers and Eddie Shore.

== Team changes ==
- The Cincinnati Mighty Ducks suspend operations, becoming dormant.
- The Edmonton Road Runners suspend operations, becoming dormant.
- The Utah Grizzlies suspend operations, becoming dormant.
- The dormant Saint John Flames resumed operations as the Omaha Ak-Sar-Ben Knights, playing in the West division.
- The dormant Louisville Panthers resumed operations as the Iowa Stars, playing in the West division.
- The St. John's Maple Leafs moved to Toronto, Ontario, becoming the Toronto Marlies.
- The Worcester IceCats moved to Peoria, Illinois, becoming the Peoria Rivermen, playing in the West division.
- The Albany River Rats shift from the East division to the Atlantic division.
- The Grand Rapids Griffins shift from the West division to the North division.

== Final standings ==
- y– indicates team clinched division and a playoff spot
- x– indicates team clinched a playoff spot
- e– indicates team was eliminated from playoff contention

=== Eastern Conference ===
Atlantic Division	GP	W	L	OTL	SOL	Pts	GF	GA
y–Portland Pirates (ANA)	80	53	19	5	3	114	306	241
x–Hartford Wolf Pack (NYR)	80	48	24	2	6	104	292	241
x–Manchester Monarchs (LAK)	80	43	30	3	4	93	236	230
x–Providence Bruins (BOS)	80	43	31	1	5	92	254	217
e–Lowell Lock Monsters (CAR/COL)	80	29	37	6	8	72	222	257
e–Springfield Falcons (TBL)	80	28	43	3	6	65	220	312
e–Albany River Rats (NJD)	80	25	48	4	3	57	206	278

East Division	GP	W	L	OTL	SOL	Pts	GF	GA
y–Wilkes-Barre/Scranton Penguins (PIT)	80	51	18	5	6	113	249	178
x–Hershey Bears (WSH)	80	44	21	5	10	103	262	234
x–Norfolk Admirals (CHI)	80	43	29	4	4	94	259	246
x–Bridgeport Sound Tigers (NYI)	80	38	33	6	3	85	246	253
e–Binghamton Senators (OTT)	80	35	37	4	4	78	258	295
e–Philadelphia Phantoms (PHI)	80	34	37	2	7	77	197	232

=== Western Conference ===
North Division	GP	W	L	OTL	SOL	Pts	GF	GA
y–Grand Rapids Griffins (DET)	80	55	20	1	4	115	323	247
x–Syracuse Crunch (CBJ)	80	47	25	5	3	102	272	251
x–Manitoba Moose (VAN)	80	44	24	7	5	100	243	217
x–Toronto Marlies (TOR)	80	41	29	6	4	92	270	263
e–Rochester Americans (BUF/FLA)	80	37	39	2	2	78	261	270
e–Hamilton Bulldogs (EDM/MTL)	80	35	41	0	4	74	225	251
e–Cleveland Barons (SJS)	80	27	48	2	3	59	210	302

West Division	GP	W	L	OTL	SOL	Pts	GF	GA
y–Milwaukee Admirals (NSH)	80	49	21	6	4	108	268	234
x–Houston Aeros (MIN)	80	50	24	3	3	106	285	242
x–Peoria Rivermen (STL)	80	46	26	3	5	100	253	226
x–Iowa Stars (DAL)	80	41	31	1	7	90	238	228
e–Chicago Wolves (ATL)	80	36	32	4	8	84	278	275
e–Omaha Ak-Sar-Ben Knights (CGY)	80	35	31	3	11	84	206	221
e–San Antonio Rampage (PHX)	80	23	50	3	4	53	153	251

== Scoring leaders ==
Note: GP = Games played; G = Goals; A = Assists; Pts = Points; PIM = Penalty minutes

Player	Team	GP	G	A	Pts	PIM
Kirby Law	Houston Aeros	80	43	67	110	95
Erik Westrum	Houston Aeros	71	34	64	98	138
Jiri Hudler	Grand Rapids Griffins	76	36	60	96	56
Patrick O'Sullivan	Houston Aeros	78	47	46	93	64
Darren Haydar	Milwaukee Admirals	80	35	57	92	50
Denis Hamel	Binghamton Senators	77	56	35	91	65
Donald MacLean	Grand Rapids Griffins	76	56	32	88	63
Brad Smyth	Hartford Wolf Pack	80	34	52	86	69
Ryan Shannon	Portland Pirates	71	27	59	86	44
Keith Aucoin	Lowell Lock Monsters	72	29	56	85	68

== Leading goaltenders ==
Note: GP = Games played; Mins = Minutes played; W = Wins; L = Losses: OTL = Overtime losses; SL = Shootout losses; GA = Goals Allowed; SO = Shutouts; GAA = Goals against average

Player	Team	GP	Mins	W	L	SL	GA	SO	GAA	Sv%
Dany Sabourin	Wilkes-Barre/Scranton Penguins	49	2943	30	14	4	111	4	2.26	0.922
Wade Flaherty	Manitoba Moose	49	2822	26	17	4	113	6	2.40	0.919
Brent Krahn	Omaha Ak-Sar-Ben Knights	57	3241	26	20	9	135	3	2.50	0.912
Mike Smith	Iowa Stars	50	3000	25	19	6	125	3	2.50	0.917
Martin Houle	Philadelphia Phantoms	40	2153	18	18	1	91	2	2.54	0.914

== Calder Cup playoffs ==
Division Semi-finals	Division Finals
A1	Portland	4
A4	Providence	2
A1	Portland	4
A2	Hartford	2
A2	Hartford	4
A3	Manchester	3
Eastern
E1	WBS	4
E4	Bridgeport	3
E1	WBS	0
E2	Hershey	4
E2	Hershey	4
E3	Norfolk	0
N1	Grand Rapids	4
N4	Toronto	1
N1	Grand Rapids	4
N3	Manitoba	3
N2	Syracuse	2
N3	Manitoba	4
Western
W1	Milwaukee	4
W4	Iowa	3
W1	Milwaukee	4
W2	Houston	0
W2	Houston	4
W3	Peoria	0

Conference Finals
A	Portland	3
E	Hershey	4
N	Grand Rapids	0
W	Milwaukee	4

Calder Cup Finals
E	Hershey	4
W	Milwaukee	2

== All Star Classic ==
The 19th AHL All-Star Classic was played on February 1, 2006, at the MTS Centre in Winnipeg, Manitoba. Team Canada defeated team PlanetUSA 9–4. In the skills competition held the night before, team Canada defeated team PlanetUSA 21–12 in front of two sellout crowds of 15,115, the largest for an AHL event.

== Trophy and award winners ==
=== Team awards ===
Calder Cup; Playoff champions:	Hershey Bears
Richard F. Canning Trophy; Eastern Conference playoff champions:	Hershey Bears
Robert W. Clarke Trophy; Western Conference playoff champions:	Milwaukee Admirals
Macgregor Kilpatrick Trophy; Regular season champions, League:	Grand Rapids Griffins
Frank Mathers Trophy; Regular Season champions, Eastern Conference:	Portland Pirates
Norman R. "Bud" Poile Trophy; Regular Season champions, Western Conference:	Grand Rapids Griffins
Emile Francis Trophy; Regular Season champions, Atlantic Division:	Portland Pirates
F. G. "Teddy" Oke Trophy; Regular Season champions, East Division:	Wilkes-Barre/Scranton Penguins
Sam Pollock Trophy; Regular Season champions, North Division:	Grand Rapids Griffins
John D. Chick Trophy; Regular Season champions, West Division:	Milwaukee Admirals

=== Individual awards ===
Les Cunningham Award; Most valuable player:	Donald MacLean - Grand Rapids Griffins
John B. Sollenberger Trophy; Top point scorer:	Kirby Law - Houston Aeros
Willie Marshall Award; Top goal scorer:	Donald MacLean - Grand Rapids Griffins & Denis Hamel - Binghamton Senators
Dudley "Red" Garrett Memorial Award; Rookie of the year:	Patrick O'Sullivan - Houston Aeros
Eddie Shore Award; Defenceman of the year:	Andy Delmore - Syracuse Crunch
Aldege "Baz" Bastien Memorial Award; Best Goaltender:	Dany Sabourin - Wilkes-Barre/Scranton Penguins
Harry "Hap" Holmes Memorial Award; Lowest goals against average:	Dany Sabourin - Wilkes-Barre/Scranton Penguins
Louis A. R. Pieri Memorial Award; Coach of the year:	Kevin Dineen - Portland Pirates
Fred T. Hunt Memorial Award; Sportsmanship / Perseverance:	Mark Cullen - Norfolk Admirals
Yanick Dupre Memorial Award; Community Service Award:	Mitch Fritz - Springfield Falcons
Jack A. Butterfield Trophy; MVP of the playoffs:	Frederic Cassivi - Hershey Bears

=== Other awards ===
James C. Hendy Memorial Award; Most outstanding executive:	Doug Yingst, Hershey Bears
Thomas Ebright Memorial Award; Career contributions:	Al Coates
James H. Ellery Memorial Awards; Outstanding media coverage:	Phil Janack, Albany (newspaper); Kelly Moore, Manitoba (radio); Gregg Mace, Hershey (television)
Ken McKenzie Award; Outstanding marketing executive:	Mike Wojociechowski, Milwaukee Admirals
Michael Condon Memorial Award; Outstanding service, on-ice official:	Luke Galvin

== See also ==
- List of AHL seasons

Preceded by 2004–05 AHL season	AHL seasons	Succeeded by 2006–07 AHL season
