= 2016–17 AHL season =

- League: American Hockey League
- Sport: Ice hockey
- Duration: October 14, 2016 - April 15, 2017

Regular season
- Macgregor Kilpatrick Trophy: Wilkes-Barre/Scranton Penguins
- Season MVP: Kenny Agostino
- Top scorer: Kenny Agostino

Playoffs
- Playoffs MVP: Tyler Bertuzzi

Calder Cup
- Champions: Grand Rapids Griffins
- Runners-up: Syracuse Crunch

AHL seasons
- 2015–16 2017–18

The 2016–17 AHL season was the 81st season of the American Hockey League. The regular season began on October 14, 2016, and ended on April 15, 2017. The 2017 Calder Cup playoffs began on April 20, 2017.

== Regular season ==
The AHL had a slight alignment shift with the addition of the Tucson Roadrunners to the one-year-old Pacific Division, bringing the division member total up to eight. It also created an unbalanced conference alignment with the Western Conference having 16 members and the Eastern Conference containing 14 members. Similar to the season scheduling in the previous season, the five California based teams, plus the new Tucson team, continue to play a 68-game season while the rest of the AHL teams play a 76-game season.

The AHL also changed the usage of home and away jerseys for the season. Before the Christmas break, home teams wear light jerseys and after the Christmas break, home teams wear dark jerseys. For the past several seasons, the visiting team wore light jerseys and the home team wore dark jerseys. Prior to the change in 2003, it was the opposite for many years.

=== Rule changes ===
The Board of Governors implemented some changes to further curb fighting in hockey. To prevent staged fights, any players involved in a fight prior to or immediately after a faceoff would be given a game misconduct which results in the player being ejected from the game. If a player accumulates ten fighting major penalties, the player would be suspended for one game following the tenth penalty and then suspended for one game after each subsequent fighting major penalty. If a player accumulates 14 fighting majors, the number of games suspended increases to two for each subsequent fighting major. Accumulated fighting majors do not include instances where the opposing player was assessed an instigator penalty.

== Team changes ==
=== Relocations ===
- The Springfield Falcons franchise was purchased by the National Hockey League's Arizona Coyotes and relocated to Tucson, Arizona, becoming the Tucson Roadrunners.
- The Portland Pirates franchise was purchased by Springfield Hockey, LLC. and relocated to Springfield, Massachusetts to become the Springfield Thunderbirds. The franchise replaced the recently relocated Springfield Falcons. The Florida Panthers continue to serve as the franchise's NHL affiliate.

=== Renamed ===
- On August 9, 2016, the reigning Calder Cup champion Lake Erie Monsters rebranded to become the Cleveland Monsters.

== Playoff format ==
The 2017 playoff format retained a similar divisional format to the 2016 Calder Cup playoffs. The revised playoff format was finalized at the Annual Board of Governors meeting that took place July 2016. During the regular season, teams receive two points for a win and one point for an overtime or shootout loss. The top four teams in each division ranked by points percentage (points earned divided by points available) qualify for the 2017 Calder Cup Playoffs. The 2017 playoffs removed the divisional fifth-place qualifier exception used by the NHL and the AHL in 2015–16.

The 2017 Calder Cup Playoffs features a divisional playoff format, leading to conference finals and ultimately the Calder Cup Finals. The division semifinals are best-of-five series; all subsequent rounds are best-of-seven.

== Final standings ==
Final standings
y– indicates team clinched division and a playoff spot
x– indicates team clinched a playoff spot
e– indicates team was eliminated from playoff contention

=== Eastern Conference ===
Atlantic Division	GP	W	L	OTL	SOL	Pts	Pts%	GF	GA
y–Wilkes-Barre/Scranton Penguins (PIT)	76	51	20	3	2	107	.704	247	170
x–Lehigh Valley Phantoms (PHI)	76	48	23	5	0	101	.664	260	219
x–Hershey Bears (WSH)	76	43	22	8	3	97	.638	252	211
x–Providence Bruins (BOS)	76	43	23	6	4	96	.632	229	188
e–Bridgeport Sound Tigers (NYI)	76	44	28	3	1	92	.605	220	212
e–Springfield Thunderbirds (FLA)	76	32	33	9	2	75	.493	197	206
e–Hartford Wolf Pack (NYR)	76	24	46	4	2	54	.355	194	280

North Division	GP	W	L	OTL	SOL	Pts	Pts%	GF	GA
y–Syracuse Crunch (TBL)	76	38	24	7	7	90	.592	232	227
x–Toronto Marlies (TOR)	76	42	29	4	1	89	.586	245	207
x–Albany Devils (NJD)	76	39	32	2	3	83	.546	204	206
x–St. John's IceCaps (MTL)	76	36	30	8	2	82	.539	216	220
e–Utica Comets (VAN)	76	35	32	7	2	79	.520	195	220
e–Rochester Americans (BUF)	76	32	41	0	3	67	.441	205	240
e–Binghamton Senators (OTT)	76	28	44	2	2	60	.395	190	266

=== Western Conference ===
Central Division	GP	W	L	OTL	SOL	Pts	Pts%	GF	GA
y–Chicago Wolves (STL)	76	44	19	8	5	101	.664	251	200
x–Grand Rapids Griffins (DET)	76	47	23	1	5	100	.658	251	190
x–Milwaukee Admirals (NSH)	76	43	26	4	3	95	.612	225	215
x–Charlotte Checkers (CAR)	76	39	29	7	1	86	.566	212	208
e–Cleveland Monsters (CBJ)	76	39	29	4	4	86	.566	195	198
e–Iowa Wild (MIN)	76	36	31	7	2	81	.533	182	196
e–Manitoba Moose (WPG)	76	29	37	5	5	68	.447	197	242
e–Rockford IceHogs (CHI)	76	25	39	9	3	62	.408	175	246

Pacific Division	GP	W	L	OTL	SOL	Pts	Pts%	GF	GA
y–San Jose Barracuda (SJS)	68	43	16	4	5	95	.699	232	176
x–San Diego Gulls (ANA)	68	43	20	3	2	91	.669	221	178
x–Ontario Reign (LAK)	68	36	21	10	1	83	.610	199	190
x–Stockton Heat (CGY)	68	34	25	7	2	77	.566	212	192
e–Bakersfield Condors (EDM)	68	33	29	5	1	72	.529	200	188
e–Tucson Roadrunners (ARI)	68	29	31	8	0	66	.485	187	237
e–Texas Stars (DAL)	76	34	37	1	4	73	.480	224	265
e–San Antonio Rampage (COL)	76	27	42	5	2	61	.401	184	240

== Statistical leaders ==
=== Leading skaters ===
The following players are sorted by points, then goals. Updated as of April 14, 2017.

GP = Games played; G = Goals; A = Assists; Pts = Points; +/– = P Plus–minus; PIM = Penalty minutes

Player	Team	GP	G	A	Pts	PIM
Kenny Agostino	Chicago Wolves	65	24	59	83	48
Chris Terry	St. John's IceCaps	58	30	38	68	36
Chris Mueller	Tucson Roadrunners	68	19	48	67	48
Wade Megan	Chicago Wolves	73	33	33	66	57
Taylor Beck	Bakersfield/Hartford	56	19	47	66	24
Cole Schneider	Rochester Americans	71	24	39	63	45
Travis Boyd	Hershey Bears	76	16	47	63	16
T. J. Brennan	Lehigh Valley Phantoms	76	21	39	60	101
Chris Bourque	Hershey Bears	76	18	42	60	46
Cory Conacher	Syracuse Crunch	56	17	43	60	113

=== Leading goaltenders ===
The following goaltenders with a minimum 1500 minutes played lead the league in goals against average. Updated as of April 15, 2017.

GP = Games played; TOI = Time on ice (in minutes); SA = Shots against; GA = Goals against; SO = Shutouts; GAA = Goals against average; SV% = Save percentage; W = Wins; L = Losses; OT = Overtime/shootout loss

Player	Team	GP	TOI	SA	GA	SO	GAA	SV%	W	L	OT
Casey DeSmith	Wilkes-Barre/Scranton Penguins	29	1730:35	787	58	1	2.01	.926	21	5	3
Zane McIntyre	Providence Bruins	31	1777:13	859	60	2	2.03	.930	21	6	2
Troy Grosenick	San Jose Barracuda	49	2728:48	1255	93	10	2.04	.926	30	10	5
Tristan Jarry	Wilkes-Barre/Scranton Penguins	45	2706:49	1300	97	3	2.15	.925	28	15	2
Jaroslav Halak	Bridgeport Sound Tigers	27	1535:59	733	55	2	2.15	.925	17	7	3

== Calder Cup playoffs ==
Division semifinals	Division finals
A1	W-B/Scranton	2
A4	Providence	3
A4	Providence	4
Atlantic Division
A3	Hershey	3
A2	Lehigh Valley	2
A3	Hershey	3
Eastern Conference
N1	Syracuse	3
N4	St. John's	1
N1	Syracuse	4
North Division
N2	Toronto	3
N2	Toronto	3
N3	Albany	1
C1	Chicago	3
C4	Charlotte	2
C1	Chicago	1
Central Division
C2	Grand Rapids	4
C2	Grand Rapids	3
C3	Milwaukee	0
Western Conference
P1	San Jose	3
P4	Stockton	2
P1	San Jose	4
Pacific Division
P2	San Diego	1
P2	San Diego	3
P3	Ontario	2

Conference finals
A4	Providence	1
N1	Syracuse	4
C2	Grand Rapids	4
P1	San Jose	1

Calder Cup final
N1	Syracuse	2
C2	Grand Rapids	4

== AHL awards ==
Calder Cup : Grand Rapids Griffins
Les Cunningham Award : Kenny Agostino, Chicago
John B. Sollenberger Trophy : Kenny Agostino, Chicago
Willie Marshall Award : Wade Megan, Chicago
Dudley "Red" Garrett Memorial Award : Danny O'Regan, San Jose
Eddie Shore Award : Matt Taormina, Syracuse
Aldege "Baz" Bastien Memorial Award : Troy Grosenick, San Jose
Harry "Hap" Holmes Memorial Award : Tristan Jarry & Casey DeSmith, Wilkes-Barre/Scranton
Louis A. R. Pieri Memorial Award : Roy Sommer, San Jose
Fred T. Hunt Memorial Award : Craig Cunningham, Tucson
Yanick Dupre Memorial Award : A. J. Greer, San Antonio
Jack A. Butterfield Trophy : Tyler Bertuzzi, Grand Rapids
Richard F. Canning Trophy : Syracuse Crunch
Robert W. Clarke Trophy : Grand Rapids Griffins
Macgregor Kilpatrick Trophy: Wilkes-Barre/Scranton Penguins
Frank Mathers Trophy (Eastern Conference regular season champions): Wilkes-Barre/Scranton Penguins
Norman R. "Bud" Poile Trophy (Western Conference regular season champions): San Jose Barracuda
Emile Francis Trophy (Atlantic Division regular season champions): Wilkes-Barre/Scranton Penguins
F. G. "Teddy" Oke Trophy (North Division regular season champions): Syracuse Crunch
Sam Pollock Trophy (Central Division regular season champions): Chicago Wolves
John D. Chick Trophy (Pacific Division regular season champions): San Jose Barracuda
James C. Hendy Memorial Award: Jim Brooks and Rob Brooks, Lehigh Valley
Thomas Ebright Memorial Award: Craig Heisinger, Manitoba
James H. Ellery Memorial Awards: Service Electric 2 Sports, Lehigh Valley
Ken McKenzie Award: Marc Lira, Toronto
Michael Condon Memorial Award: Kevin Hastings
President's Awards: Organization – San Diego

=== All-Star teams ===
First All-Star Team

- Troy Grosenick (G) – San Jose
- T. J. Brennan (D) – Lehigh Valley
- Matt Taormina (D) – Syracuse
- Kenny Agostino (F) – Chicago
- Taylor Beck (F) – Bakersfield/Hartford
- Wade Megan (F) – Chicago

Second All-Star Team

- Zane McIntyre (G) – Providence
- Tim Heed (D) – San Jose
- David Warsofsky (D) – Wilkes-Barre/Scranton
- Travis Boyd (F) – Hershey
- Cory Conacher (F) – Syracuse
- Chris Terry (F) – St. John's

All-Rookie Team

- Casey DeSmith (G) – Wilkes-Barre/Scranton
- Devon Toews (D) – Bridgeport
- Kyle Wood (D) – Tucson
- Jake Guentzel (F) – Wilkes-Barre/Scranton
- Mark Jankowski (F) – Stockton
- Danny O'Regan (F) – San Jose

== See also ==
- List of AHL seasons
- 2016 in ice hockey
- 2017 in ice hockey

Preceded by 2015–16	AHL seasons	Succeeded by 2017–18
