= 2010–11 AHL season =

- League: American Hockey League
- Sport: Ice hockey
- Duration: October 8, 2010 - April 10, 2011

Regular season
- Macgregor Kilpatrick Trophy: Wilkes-Barre/Scranton Penguins
- Season MVP: Corey Locke
- Top scorer: Corey Locke

Playoffs
- Playoffs MVP: Robin Lehner

Calder Cup
- Champions: Binghamton Senators
- Runners-up: Houston Aeros

AHL seasons
- 2009–10 2011–12

The 2010–11 AHL season was the 75th season of the American Hockey League. An all-time high of thirty teams played 80 games each during the regular season schedule, which started on October 8, 2010, and ended on April 10, 2011. This season featured the addition of one new team, the relocation of two others, and the renaming of another.

== Schedule ==
The 2010–11 AHL schedule, announced on August 25, 2010, consisted of 1,200 games held between October 8, 2010, and April 10, 2011. An outdoor game between Connecticut Whale and Providence Bruins was played at Rentschler Field on February 19, 2011. Providence won the game 5–4 in a shootout in front of 21,673 spectators.

== Team and NHL affiliation changes ==
=== Team changes ===
- The Albany River Rats moved to Charlotte, NC due to major financial losses. They became the Charlotte Checkers.
- The Lowell Devils relocated to Albany, NY due to changes in the lease with UMass Lowell making it "financially impossible" to stay. They retained the Devils nickname.
- The dormant Edmonton Road Runners were reactivated and moved to Oklahoma City, OK as the sixth incarnation of the Edmonton Oilers affiliate. The team played as the Oklahoma City Barons, thus making it the first time the franchise has set up operations in the United States.
- The Hartford Wolf Pack were renamed the Connecticut Whale on November 27, 2010.

=== Affiliation changes ===
AHL team	new affiliate	old affiliate
Oklahoma City Barons	Edmonton Oilers	new team
Springfield Falcons	Columbus Blue Jackets	Edmonton Oilers
Syracuse Crunch	Anaheim Ducks	Columbus Blue Jackets

== Final standings ==
y– indicates team clinched division and a playoff spot
x– indicates team clinched a playoff spot
e– indicates team was eliminated from playoff contention

=== Eastern Conference ===
Atlantic Division	GP	W	L	OTL	SOL	Pts	GF	GA
y–Portland Pirates (BUF)	80	47	24	7	2	103	280	238
x–Manchester Monarchs (LAK)	80	44	26	4	6	98	255	209
x–Hartford Wolf Pack/Connecticut Whale (NYR)	80	40	32	2	6	88	221	223
e–Worcester Sharks (SJS)	80	36	31	4	9	85	210	245
e–Providence Bruins (BOS)	80	38	36	3	3	82	209	252
e–Springfield Falcons (CBJ)	80	35	40	2	3	75	233	253
e–Bridgeport Sound Tigers (NYI)	80	30	39	4	7	71	218	266

East Division	GP	W	L	OTL	SOL	Pts	GF	GA
y–Wilkes-Barre/Scranton Penguins (PIT)	80	58	21	0	1	117	261	183
x–Hershey Bears (WSH)	80	46	26	3	5	100	255	214
x–Charlotte Checkers (CAR)	80	44	27	2	7	97	265	243
x–Norfolk Admirals (TBL)	80	39	26	9	6	93	265	230
x–Binghamton Senators (OTT)	80	42	30	3	5	92	255	221
e–Syracuse Crunch (ANA)	80	35	38	3	4	77	217	249
e–Adirondack Phantoms (PHI)	80	31	39	4	6	72	197	248
e–Albany Devils (NJD)	80	32	42	1	5	70	217	283

=== Western Conference ===
North Division	GP	W	L	OTL	SOL	Pts	GF	GA
y–Hamilton Bulldogs (MTL)	80	44	27	2	7	97	226	193
x–Lake Erie Monsters (COL)	80	44	28	3	5	96	223	206
x–Manitoba Moose (VAN)	80	43	30	1	6	93	220	210
e–Abbotsford Heat (CGY)	80	38	32	4	6	86	186	212
e–Toronto Marlies (TOR)	80	37	32	1	10	85	228	219
e–Grand Rapids Griffins (DET)	80	36	34	2	8	82	227	254
e–Rochester Americans (FLA)	80	31	39	5	5	72	218	266

West Division	GP	W	L	OTL	SOL	Pts	GF	GA
y–Milwaukee Admirals (NSH)	80	44	22	6	8	102	226	194
x–Houston Aeros (MIN)	80	46	28	1	5	98	240	212
x–Peoria Rivermen (STL)	80	42	30	3	5	92	223	218
x–Texas Stars (DAL)	80	41	29	4	6	92	213	210
x–Oklahoma City Barons (EDM)	80	40	29	2	9	91	245	234
e–Chicago Wolves (ATL)	80	39	30	5	6	89	260	262
e–San Antonio Rampage (PHX)	80	40	33	4	3	87	228	245
e–Rockford IceHogs (CHI)	80	38	33	4	5	85	216	245

== Statistical leaders ==
=== Leading skaters ===
The following players are sorted by points, then goals.

GP = Games played; G = Goals; A = Assists; Pts = Points; +/– = P Plus–minus; PIM = Penalty minutes

Player	Team	GP	G	A	Pts	PIM
Corey Locke	Binghamton Senators	69	21	65	86	42
Alexandre Giroux	Oklahoma City Barons	70	32	46	78	63
Jason Krog	Chicago Wolves	80	19	56	75	22
Darren Haydar	Chicago Wolves	77	27	47	74	60
Nigel Dawes	Hamilton Bulldogs	66	41	31	72	24
Marc-Antoine Pouliot	Norfolk Admirals	69	25	47	72	53
Brad Moran	Oklahoma City Barons	79	20	52	72	40
Keith Aucoin	Hershey Bears	53	18	54	72	49
Ben Walter	Lake Erie Monsters	77	23	47	70	24
T. J. Hensick	Peoria Rivermen	59	21	48	69	27

=== Leading goaltenders ===
The following goaltenders with a minimum 1500 minutes played lead the league in goals against average.

GP = Games played; TOI = Time on ice (in minutes); SA = Shots against; GA = Goals against; SO = Shutouts; GAA = Goals against average; SV% = Save percentage; W = Wins; L = Losses; OT = Overtime/shootout loss

Player	Team	GP	TOI	SA	GA	SO	GAA	SV%	W	L	OT
Curtis Sanford	Hamilton Bulldogs	40	2273	1036	73	5	1.93	0.930	22	13	2
Brad Thiessen	Wilkes-Barre/Scranton Penguins	46	2567	1065	83	7	1.94	0.922	35	8	1
Mark Dekanich	Milwaukee Admirals	43	2500	1212	84	4	2.02	0.931	23	12	5
Richard Bachman	Texas Stars	55	3191	1595	117	6	2.20	0.927	28	19	5
Michael Leighton	Adirondack Phantoms	30	1783	889	66	5	2.22	0.926	14	12	3

== Calder Cup playoffs ==
=== Bracket ===
Division Semifinals	Division Finals
A1	Portland	4
A3	Connecticut	2
A1	Portland	2
Atlantic Division
E5	Binghamton	4
A2	Manchester	3
E5	Binghamton	4
Eastern Conference
E1	Wilkes-Barre/Scranton	4
E4	Norfolk	2
E1	Wilkes-Barre/Scranton	2
East Division
E3	Charlotte	4
E2	Hershey	2
E3	Charlotte	4
N1	Hamilton	4
W5	Oklahoma City	2
N1	Hamilton	4
North Division
N3	Manitoba	3
N2	Lake Erie	3
N3	Manitoba	4
Western Conference
W1	Milwaukee	4
W4	Texas	2
W1	Milwaukee	3
West Division
W2	Houston	4
W2	Houston	4
W3	Peoria	0

Conference Finals
E5	Binghamton	4
E3	Charlotte	0
N1	Hamilton	3
W2	Houston	4

Calder Cup Final
E5	Binghamton	4
W2	Houston	2

== AHL awards ==
2010–11 AHL awards
Award	Recipient(s)
Calder Cup	Binghamton Senators
Les Cunningham Award	Corey Locke (Binghamton Senators)
John B. Sollenberger Trophy	Corey Locke (Binghamton Senators)
Willie Marshall Award	Colin McDonald (Oklahoma City Barons)
Dudley "Red" Garrett Memorial Award	Luke Adam (Portland Pirates)
Eddie Shore Award	Marc-Andre Gragnani (Portland Pirates)
Aldege "Baz" Bastien Memorial Award	Brad Thiessen (Wilkes-Barre/Scranton Penguins)
Harry "Hap" Holmes Memorial Award	Brad Thiessen & John Curry (Wilkes-Barre/Scranton Penguins)
Louis A. R. Pieri Memorial Award	John Hynes (Wilkes-Barre/Scranton Penguins)
Fred T. Hunt Memorial Award	Bryan Helmer (Oklahoma City Barons)
Yanick Dupre Memorial Award	Cody Bass (Binghamton Senators)
Jack A. Butterfield Trophy	Robin Lehner (Binghamton Senators)
Richard F. Canning Trophy	Binghamton Senators
Robert W. Clarke Trophy	Houston Aeros
Macgregor Kilpatrick Trophy	Wilkes-Barre/Scranton Penguins
Frank Mathers Trophy	Wilkes-Barre/Scranton Penguins
Norman R. "Bud" Poile Trophy	Milwaukee Admirals
Emile Francis Trophy	Portland Pirates
F. G. "Teddy" Oke Trophy	Wilkes-Barre/Scranton Penguins
Sam Pollock Trophy	Hamilton Bulldogs
John D. Chick Trophy	Milwaukee Admirals
James C. Hendy Memorial Award	Michael A. Mudd (Worcester)
Thomas Ebright Memorial Award	Mark Chipman
James H. Ellery Memorial Awards	Tim Leone (Hershey)
Ken McKenzie Award	Mike Cosentino (Toronto)
Michael Condon Memorial Award	Brian Lemon

== See also ==
- List of AHL seasons
- 2010 in ice hockey
- 2011 in ice hockey

Preceded by 2009–10 AHL season	AHL seasons	Succeeded by 2011–12 AHL season
