= Fred T. Hunt Memorial Award =

North American ice hockey award founded 1978

The Fred T. Hunt Memorial Award is an American Hockey League (AHL) trophy awarded annually to the player best exemplifying sportsmanship, determination, and dedication to hockey. The award is voted upon by players and members of the media around the AHL.

The award is named for Fred T. Hunt, a former player, general manager and governor for the Buffalo Bisons, earning six Calder Cup championships during his AHL career. The original Hunt Trophy was donated by the Buffalo Sabres, whose entry to the National Hockey League resulted in the demise of the Buffalo Bisons.

== Award winners ==
Season	Player	Team
1977–78	Blake Dunlop	Maine Mariners
1978–79	Bernie Johnston	Maine Mariners
1979–80	Norm Dube	Nova Scotia Voyageurs
1980–81	Tony Cassolato	Hershey Bears
1981–82	Mike Kaszycki	New Brunswick Hawks
1982–83	Ross Yates	Binghamton Whalers
1983–84	Claude Larose	Sherbrooke Jets
1984–85	Paul Gardner	Binghamton Whalers
1985–86	Steve Tsujiura	Maine Mariners
1986–87	Glenn Merkosky (1)	Adirondack Red Wings
1987–88	Bruce Boudreau	Springfield Indians
1988–89	Murray Eaves (1)	Adirondack Red Wings
1989–90	Murray Eaves (2)	Adirondack Red Wings
1990–91	Glenn Merkosky (2)	Adirondack Red Wings
1991–92	John Anderson	New Haven Nighthawks
1992–93	Tim Tookey	Hershey Bears
1993–94	Jim Nesich	Cape Breton Oilers
1994–95	Steve Larouche	Prince Edward Island Senators
1995–96	Ken Gernander (1)	Binghamton Rangers
1996–97	Steve Passmore	Hamilton Bulldogs
1997–98	Craig Charron	Rochester Americans
1998–99	Mitch Lamoureux	Hershey Bears
1999–00	Randy Cunneyworth	Rochester Americans
2000–01	Kent Hulst	Portland Pirates, Providence Bruins
2001–02	Nathan Dempsey	St. John's Maple Leafs
2002–03	Chris Ferraro	Portland Pirates
2002–03	Eric Healey	Manchester Monarchs
2003–04	Ken Gernander (2)	Hartford Wolf Pack
2004–05	Chris Taylor	Rochester Americans
2005–06	Mark Cullen	Norfolk Admirals
2006–07	Mike Keane	Manitoba Moose
2007–08	Jordan Sigalet	Providence Bruins
2008–09	Ajay Baines	Iowa Chops
2009–10	Casey Borer	Albany River Rats
2010–11	Bryan Helmer	Oklahoma City Barons
2011–12	Chris Minard	Grand Rapids Griffins
2012–13	Brandon Davidson	Oklahoma City Barons
2013–14	Jake Dowell	Iowa Wild
2014–15	Jeff Hoggan	Grand Rapids Griffins
2015–16	Tom Kostopoulos	Wilkes-Barre/Scranton Penguins
2016–17	Craig Cunningham	Tucson Roadrunners
2017–18	Bracken Kearns	Binghamton Devils
2018–19	Brett Sutter	Ontario Reign
2019–20	John McCarthy	San Jose Barracuda
2020–21	Cal O'Reilly	Lehigh Valley Phantoms
2021–22	Sam Anas	Springfield Thunderbirds
2022–23	Logan Shaw	Toronto Marlies
2023–24	Spencer Knight	Charlotte Checkers
2024–25	Cal O'Reilly	Milwaukee Admirals
