= Yanick Dupre Memorial Award =

Award

The Yanick Dupre Memorial Award is presented annually to the American Hockey League's man of the year for service to his local community. The award winner is chosen by the league president.

The award is named after former Hershey Bears player Yanick Dupre, who died of leukemia at age 24.

== Winners ==
Season	Player	Team
1997–98	John Jakopin	Beast of New Haven
1998–99	Brent Thompson	Hartford Wolf Pack
1999–00	Mike Minard (1)	Hamilton Bulldogs
2000–01	Mike Minard (2)	St. John's Maple Leafs
2001–02	Travis Roche	Houston Aeros
2002–03	Jimmy Roy	Manitoba Moose
2003–04	Kurtis Foster	Chicago Wolves
2004–05	Duncan Milroy	Hamilton Bulldogs
2005–06	Mitch Fritz	Springfield Falcons
2006–07	Matt Carkner	Wilkes-Barre/Scranton Penguins
2007–08	Denis Hamel	Binghamton Senators
2008–09	Brandon Rogers	Houston Aeros
2009–10	Josh Tordjman	San Antonio Rampage
2010–11	Cody Bass	Binghamton Senators
2011–12	Nick Petrecki	Worcester Sharks
2012–13	Michael Zigomanis	Toronto Marlies
2013–14	Eric Neilson	Syracuse Crunch
2014–15	Kyle Hagel	Charlotte Checkers
2015–16	Ryan Carpenter	San Jose Barracuda
2016–17	A. J. Greer	San Antonio Rampage
2017–18	Scooter Vaughan	Chicago Wolves
2018–19	Landon Ferraro	Iowa Wild
2019–20	Troy Grosenick	Milwaukee Admirals
2020–21	Athletic trainers	All 31 teams
2021–22	Dakota Mermis	Iowa Wild
2022–23	Jimmy Oligny	Manitoba Moose
2023–24	Daniel Walcott	Syracuse Crunch
2024–25	Curtis McKenzie	Texas Stars
2025–26	Tyrel Bauer	Manitoba Moose
