= 2001–02 AHL season =

- League: American Hockey League
- Sport: Ice hockey

Regular season
- Macgregor Kilpatrick Trophy: Bridgeport Sound Tigers
- Season MVP: Eric Boguniecki
- Top scorer: Donald MacLean

Playoffs
- Playoffs MVP: Pasi Nurminen

Calder Cup
- Champions: Chicago Wolves
- Runners-up: Bridgeport Sound Tigers

AHL seasons
- 2000–01 2002–03

The 2001–02 AHL season was the 66th season of the American Hockey League. It was the season of the biggest growth in the AHL's history, as it accepted eight new teams. The demise of the International Hockey League brought six teams transferring from the defunct league, in addition to two expansion teams.

The AHL realigned divisions again. The Eastern conference consisted of the East, North and Canadian divisions. The Western conference consisted of the Central, South and West divisions. The league also announced three additional trophies, two of which were awarded for the regular season champions of the new divisions. The Norman R. "Bud" Poile Trophy went to the West division, and the Emile Francis Trophy went to the North division. The third trophy, the Michael Condon Memorial Award was first awarded for outstanding service by an on-ice official in the AHL.

Twenty-seven teams played 80 games each in the schedule. The Bridgeport Sound Tigers finished first overall in the regular season. The Chicago Wolves won their first Calder Cup championship, in their inaugural AHL season.

== Team changes ==
- The Louisville Panthers suspend operations, becoming dormant.
- The Kentucky Thoroughblades move to Cleveland, Ohio, becoming the second iteration of the Cleveland Barons.
- The Bridgeport Sound Tigers join the AHL as an expansion team, based in Bridgeport, Connecticut.
- The Manchester Monarchs join the AHL as an expansion team, based in Manchester, New Hampshire.

Teams from the International Hockey League

Six teams transferred to the American Hockey League, when the International Hockey League ceased operations.

- The Chicago Wolves based in Rosemont, Illinois.
- The Grand Rapids Griffins based in Grand Rapids, Michigan.
- The Houston Aeros based in Houston, Texas.
- The Manitoba Moose based in Winnipeg, Manitoba.
- The Milwaukee Admirals based in Milwaukee, Wisconsin.
- The Utah Grizzlies based in Salt Lake City, Utah.

== Final standings ==
- y– indicates team clinched division and a playoff spot
- x– indicates team clinched a playoff spot
- e– indicates team was eliminated from playoff contention

=== Eastern Conference ===
Canadian Division	GP	W	L	T	OTL	Pts	GF	GA
y–Quebec Citadelles (MTL)	80	35	27	15	3	88	257	254
x–Hamilton Bulldogs (EDM)	80	37	30	10	3	87	247	205
x–St. John's Maple Leafs (TOR)	80	34	27	17	2	87	256	240
x–Manitoba Moose (VAN)	80	39	33	4	4	86	270	260
e–Saint John Flames (CGY)	80	29	34	13	4	75	182	202

North Division	GP	W	L	T	OTL	Pts	GF	GA
y–Lowell Lock Monsters (CAR)	80	41	25	11	3	96	229	209
x–Manchester Monarchs (LAK)	80	38	28	11	3	90	236	225
x–Worcester IceCats (STL)	80	39	33	7	1	86	245	218
e–Portland Pirates (WSH)	80	30	31	15	4	79	220	225
e–Springfield Falcons (PHX/TBL)	80	35	41	2	2	74	213	237

East Division	GP	W	L	T	OTL	Pts	GF	GA
y–Bridgeport Sound Tigers (NYI)	80	43	25	8	4	98	240	192
x–Hartford Wolf Pack (NYR)	80	41	26	10	3	95	249	243
x–Providence Bruins (BOS)	80	35	33	8	4	82	190	223
e–Albany River Rats (NJD)	80	14	42	12	12	52	172	271

=== Western Conference ===
Central Division	GP	W	L	T	OTL	Pts	GF	GA
y–Syracuse Crunch (CBJ)	80	39	23	13	5	96	228	193
x–Rochester Americans (BUF)	80	32	30	15	3	82	206	211
x–Cincinnati Mighty Ducks (ANA/DET)	80	33	33	11	3	80	216	211
e–Cleveland Barons (SJS)	80	29	40	7	4	69	223	268

West Division	GP	W	L	T	OTL	Pts	GF	GA
y–Grand Rapids Griffins (OTT)	80	42	27	11	0	95	217	178
x–Houston Aeros (MIN)	80	39	26	10	5	93	234	232
x–Utah Grizzlies (DAL/FLA)	80	40	29	6	5	91	240	225
x–Chicago Wolves (ATL)	80	37	31	7	5	86	250	236
e–Milwaukee Admirals (NSH)	80	30	35	10	5	75	198	207

South Division	GP	W	L	T	OTL	Pts	GF	GA
y–Norfolk Admirals (CHI)	80	38	26	12	4	92	222	205
x–Hershey Bears (COL)	80	36	27	11	6	89	200	193
x–Philadelphia Phantoms (PHI)	80	33	27	15	5	86	206	210
e–Wilkes-Barre/Scranton Penguins (PIT)	80	20	44	13	3	56	201	274

== Scoring leaders ==
Note: GP = Games played; G = Goals; A = Assists; Pts = Points; PIM = Penalty minutes

Player	Team	GP	G	A	Pts	PIM
Donald MacLean	St. John's Maple Leafs	75	33	54	87	49
Eric Boguniecki	Worcester IceCats	45	38	46	84	100
Rob Brown	Chicago Wolves	80	29	54	83	103
Brad Smyth	Hartford Wolf Pack	79	34	48	82	90
Jason Chimera	Hamilton Bulldogs	77	26	51	77	158
Justin Papineau	Worcester IceCats	75	38	38	76	86
Eric Landry	Quebec Citadelles	73	26	36	62	119
Brian Swanson	Hamilton Bulldogs	65	34	39	73	26
Bob Wren	St. John's Maple Leafs	69	24	49	73	83

- complete list

== Calder Cup Playoffs ==
Conference Qualifiers
7	St. John's	2
10	Providence	0
8	Worcester	1
9	Manitoba	2
7	Chicago	2
10	Cincinnati	1
8	Philadelphia	2
9	Rochester	0

Conference Quarterfinals
1	Bridgeport	3
9	Manitoba	1
2	Lowell	2
7	St. John's	3
Eastern Conference
3	Quebec	0
6	Hamilton	3
4	Hartford	3
5	Manchester	2
1	Syracuse	3
8	Philadelphia	0
2	Grand Rapids	2
7	Chicago	3
Western Conference
3	Norfolk	1
6	Hershey	3
4	Houston	3
5	Utah	2

Conference Semifinals
1	Bridgeport	4
7	St. John's	0
4	Hartford	1
6	Hamilton	4
1	Syracuse	3
7	Chicago	4
4	Houston	4
6	Hershey	0

Conference Finals
1	Bridgeport	4
6	Hamilton	3
4	Houston	1
7	Chicago	4

Calder Cup Final
E1	Bridgeport	1
W7	Chicago	4

Note: Pairings are re-seeded after each of the first two rounds.

== All Star Classic ==
The 15th AHL All-Star Game was played on February 14, 2002 at the Mile One Stadium in St. John's, Newfoundland and Labrador. Team Canada defeated Team PlanetUSA 13–11. In the skills competition held the day before the All-Star Game, Team Canada won 21–9 over Team PlanetUSA.

== Trophy and award winners ==
=== Team awards ===
Calder Cup; Playoff champions:	Chicago Wolves
Richard F. Canning Trophy; Eastern Conference playoff champions:	Bridgeport Sound Tigers
Robert W. Clarke Trophy; Western Conference playoff champions:	Chicago Wolves
Macgregor Kilpatrick Trophy; Regular season champions, league:	Bridgeport Sound Tigers
Frank Mathers Trophy; Regular season champions, South Division:	Norfolk Admirals
Norman R. "Bud" Poile Trophy; Regular season champions, West Division:	Grand Rapids Griffins
Emile Francis Trophy; Regular season champions, North Division:	Lowell Lock Monsters
F. G. "Teddy" Oke Trophy; Regular season champions, East Division:	Bridgeport Sound Tigers
Sam Pollock Trophy; Regular season champions, Canadian Division:	Quebec Citadelles
John D. Chick Trophy; Regular season champions, Central Division:	Syracuse Crunch

=== Individual awards ===
Les Cunningham Award; Most valuable player:	Eric Boguniecki - Worcester IceCats
John B. Sollenberger Trophy; Top point scorer:	Donald MacLean - St. John's Maple Leafs
Dudley "Red" Garrett Memorial Award; Rookie of the year:	Tyler Arnason - Norfolk Admirals
Eddie Shore Award; Defenceman of the year:	John Slaney - Philadelphia Phantoms
Aldege "Baz" Bastien Memorial Award; Best goaltender:	Martin Prusek - Grand Rapids Griffins
Harry "Hap" Holmes Memorial Award; Lowest goals against average:	Martin Prusek, Simon Lajeunesse & Mathieu Chouinard - Grand Rapids Griffins
Louis A.R. Pieri Memorial Award; Coach of the year:	Bruce Cassidy - Grand Rapids Griffins
Fred T. Hunt Memorial Award; Sportsmanship / Perseverance:	Nathan Dempsey - St. John's Maple Leafs
Yanick Dupre Memorial Award; Community Service Award:	Travis Roche - Houston Aeros
Jack A. Butterfield Trophy; MVP of the playoffs:	Pasi Nurminen - Chicago Wolves

=== Other awards ===
James C. Hendy Memorial Award; Most outstanding executive:	Glenn Stanford, St. John's Maple Leafs
Thomas Ebright Memorial Award; Career contributions:	Bruce Landon
James H. Ellery Memorial Awards; Outstanding media coverage:	Garry McKay, Hamilton, (newspaper); WOOD-TV, Grand Rapids, (radio); Tom Grace, Wilkes-Barre/Scranton, (television)
Ken McKenzie Award; Outstanding marketing executive:	Jim Sarosy, Syracuse Crunch
Michael Condon Memorial Award; Outstanding service, on-ice official:	Jim Doyle

== See also ==
- List of AHL seasons

Preceded by 2000–01 AHL season	AHL seasons	Succeeded by 2002–03 AHL season
