= Michael Condon Memorial Award =

Ice hockey award of the United States

The Michael Condon Memorial Award is presented annually for outstanding service by an on-ice official in the American Hockey League. The award is named after veteran linesman Mike Condon, who died suddenly during the 2001–02 season.

== Winners ==
Season	Official
2001–02	Jim Doyle
2002–03	Marty Demers
2003–04	Dan Murphy
2004–05	Matt Dunne
2005–06	Luke Galvin
2006–07	Leo Boylan
2007–08	Terry Koharski
2008–09	Al Stensland
2009–10	David Butova
2010–11	Brian Lemon
2011–12	Bob Paquette
2012–13	Bob Goodman
2013–14	Jim Vail
2014–15	Mike Emanatian
2015–16	Joe Ross
2016–17	Kevin Hastings
2017–18	Frank Murphy
2018–19	Fred Hudy; Carl Sasyn
2019–20	Peter Feola
2020–21	Tim Mayer
2021–22	Brent Colby
2022–23	Jud Ritter
