= Emile Francis Trophy =

American ice hockey award

- Sport: Ice hockey
- Awarded for: Atlantic Division champions of the American Hockey League

History
- First award: 2001–02 AHL season
- Most wins: Providence Bruins (7)
- Most recent: Providence Bruins

The Emile Francis Trophy is presented annually to the American Hockey League (AHL) team that has the best record in the Atlantic Division.

The award is named after former AHL player Emile Francis, who later coached in the National Hockey League. Previously, it was awarded to winner of the North Division (2002–2003).

== Winners ==
Total awards won
Wins	Team
7	Providence Bruins
4	Manchester Monarchs
3	Hershey Bears
2	Hartford Wolf Pack
2	Charlotte Checkers
2	Portland Pirates
1	Lehigh Valley Phantoms
1	Lowell Lock Monsters
1	St. John's IceCaps
1	Wilkes-Barre/Scranton Penguins
1	Worcester Sharks

=== Winner by season ===
Key

- ‡ = Eventual Calder Cup champions

Awarded for	Season	Team	Win
North Division champions	2001–02	Lowell Lock Monsters	1
North Division champions	2002–03	Providence Bruins	1
Atlantic Division champions	2003–04	Hartford Wolf Pack	1
Atlantic Division champions	2004–05	Manchester Monarchs	1
Atlantic Division champions	2005–06	Portland Pirates	1
Atlantic Division champions	2006–07	Manchester Monarchs	2
Atlantic Division champions	2007–08	Providence Bruins	2
Atlantic Division champions	2008–09	Hartford Wolf Pack	2
Atlantic Division champions	2009–10	Worcester Sharks	1
Atlantic Division champions	2010–11	Portland Pirates	2
Atlantic Division champions	2011–12	St. John's IceCaps	1
Atlantic Division champions	2012–13	Providence Bruins	3
Atlantic Division champions	2013–14	Manchester Monarchs	3
Atlantic Division champions	2014–15	Manchester Monarchs‡	4
Atlantic Division champions	2015–16	Hershey Bears	1
Atlantic Division champions	2016–17	Wilkes-Barre/Scranton Penguins	1
Atlantic Division champions	2017–18	Lehigh Valley Phantoms	1
Atlantic Division champions	2018–19	Charlotte Checkers‡	1
Atlantic Division champions	2019–20	Providence Bruins	4
Atlantic Division champions	2020–21	Providence Bruins	5
Atlantic Division champions	2021–22	Charlotte Checkers	2
Atlantic Division champions	2022–23	Providence Bruins	6
Atlantic Division champions	2023-24	Hershey Bears‡	2
Atlantic Division champions	2024–25	Hershey Bears	3
Atlantic Division champions	2025–26	Providence Bruins	7
