= 2011–12 AHL season =

- League: American Hockey League
- Sport: Ice hockey
- Duration: October 7, 2011 - April 15, 2012

Regular season
- Macgregor Kilpatrick Trophy: Norfolk Admirals
- Season MVP: Cory Conacher
- Top scorer: Chris Bourque

Playoffs
- Playoffs MVP: Alexandre Picard

Calder Cup
- Champions: Norfolk Admirals
- Runners-up: Toronto Marlies

AHL seasons
- 2010–11 2012–13

The 2011–12 AHL season was the 76th season of the American Hockey League. The regular season began on October 7, 2011, and concluded on April 15, 2012. The 2012 Calder Cup playoffs follows the conclusion of the regular season.

== Regular season ==
The 2011–12 season would feature scheduling changes in the regular season and post season. The major change would be the elimination of four games and extending the season by a week. The reasoning behind the change was to eliminate teams having to play four games in five nights. This would bring the total number of games for each team to 76. To accomplish that, the league decided to add an additional week to the season.

On July 5, 2011, the league's new realignment was revealed. The league moved from having four divisions of seven/eight teams to six even divisions of five teams, similar to that of the NHL. The Western Conference consisted of the West, Midwest, and North divisions; the Eastern Conference consisted of the Atlantic, Northeast, and East divisions. As a result of the Manitoba Moose relocating to St. John's, they switched over to the Eastern Conference, while the Charlotte Checkers moved over to the Western Conference.

The third installment of the AHL Outdoor Classic took place in Canada, with the Hamilton Bulldogs hosting the Toronto Marlies in a regional rivalry game at Ivor Wynne Stadium on January 21. The Marlies won the game 7–2 in front of a crowd of 20,565 spectators. This marks the first time the event has been played in Canada, and the event was moved up to the third weekend in January, instead of the third weekend in February as it has been in previous years. In addition to this game, another outdoor AHL game, between the Hershey Bears and the Adirondack Phantoms, took place as part of the 2012 NHL Winter Classic festivities on January 6, 2012. The Phantoms won that game 4–3 in overtime, and an AHL attendance record was set as the game drew a crowd of 45,653 fans.

The Norfolk Admirals set a professional hockey record with 28 consecutive wins.

== Playoff format ==
The 2011–12 playoff format will change as a result of the scheduling changes. The first round of the playoffs will now be a best of five series and the following rounds will continue to be best of seven game series'.

Eight teams per conference will qualify for the playoffs. The three division winners will earn the top three seeds. Seeds four through eight will be determined by regular season points out of the remaining teams in the division. Team will be re-seeded after the first round so that the highest remaining seed plays the lowest remaining seed.

== Team and NHL affiliation changes ==
=== Team changes ===
- The Manitoba Moose relocated to St. John's, Newfoundland and Labrador, due to the Atlanta Thrashers of the NHL relocating to Winnipeg, Manitoba, as the Winnipeg Jets. They became the St. John's IceCaps, affiliating as the Jets' farm club.

=== Affiliation changes ===
AHL team	New affiliate	Old affiliate
St. John's IceCaps (formerly Manitoba)	Winnipeg (formerly Atlanta)	Vancouver
Chicago Wolves	Vancouver	Atlanta (now Winnipeg)
Rochester Americans	Buffalo	Florida
San Antonio Rampage	Florida	Phoenix
Portland Pirates	Phoenix	Buffalo

== Final standings ==
y– indicates team clinched division and a playoff spot
x– indicates team clinched a playoff spot
e– indicates team was eliminated from playoff contention

=== Eastern Conference ===
Atlantic Division	GP	W	L	OTL	SOL	Pts	GF	GA
y–St. John's IceCaps (WPG)	76	43	25	5	3	94	240	216
x–Manchester Monarchs (LAK)	76	39	32	2	3	83	207	208
e–Portland Pirates (PHX)	76	36	31	4	5	81	223	254
e–Providence Bruins (BOS)	76	35	34	3	4	77	193	214
e–Worcester Sharks (SJS)	76	31	33	4	8	74	199	218

Northeast Division	GP	W	L	OTL	SOL	Pts	GF	GA
y–Bridgeport Sound Tigers (NYI)	76	41	26	3	6	91	233	219
x–Connecticut Whale (NYR)	76	36	26	7	7	86	210	208
e–Adirondack Phantoms (PHI)	76	37	35	2	2	78	204	217
e–Springfield Falcons (CBJ)	76	36	34	3	3	78	217	231
e–Albany Devils (NJD)	76	31	34	6	5	73	190	226

East Division	GP	W	L	OTL	SOL	Pts	GF	GA
y–Norfolk Admirals (TBL)	76	55	18	1	2	113	273	180
x–Wilkes-Barre/Scranton Penguins (PIT)	76	44	25	2	5	95	235	215
x–Hershey Bears (WSH)	76	38	26	4	8	88	244	225
x–Syracuse Crunch (ANA)	76	37	29	5	5	84	238	234
e–Binghamton Senators (OTT)	76	29	40	5	2	65	201	243

=== Western Conference ===
North Division	GP	W	L	OTL	SOL	Pts	GF	GA
y–Toronto Marlies (TOR)	76	44	24	5	3	96	217	175
x–Rochester Americans (BUF)	76	36	26	10	4	86	224	221
e–Lake Erie Monsters (COL)	76	37	29	3	7	84	189	210
e–Grand Rapids Griffins (DET)	76	33	32	7	4	77	245	249
e–Hamilton Bulldogs (MTL)	76	34	35	2	5	75	185	226

Midwest Division	GP	W	L	OTL	SOL	Pts	GF	GA
y–Chicago Wolves (VAN)	76	42	27	4	3	91	213	193
x–Milwaukee Admirals (NSH)	76	40	29	2	5	87	210	190
e–Charlotte Checkers (CAR)	76	38	29	3	6	85	209	214
e–Peoria Rivermen (STL)	76	39	33	2	2	82	217	207
e–Rockford IceHogs (CHI)	76	35	32	2	7	79	207	228

West Division	GP	W	L	OTL	SOL	Pts	GF	GA
y–Oklahoma City Barons (EDM)	76	45	22	4	5	99	213	176
x–Abbotsford Heat (CGY)	76	42	26	3	5	92	200	201
x–San Antonio Rampage (FLA)	76	41	30	3	2	87	197	204
x–Houston Aeros (MIN)	76	35	25	5	11	86	202	206
e–Texas Stars (DAL)	76	31	40	3	2	67	224	251

== Statistical leaders ==
=== Leading skaters ===
The following players are sorted by points, then goals.

GP = Games played; G = Goals; A = Assists; Pts = Points; +/– = P Plus–minus; PIM = Penalty minutes

Player	Team	GP	G	A	Pts	PIM
Chris Bourque	Hershey Bears	73	27	66	93	42
Cory Conacher	Norfolk Admirals	75	39	41	80	114
Patrick Maroon	Syracuse Crunch	75	32	42	74	120
T. J. Hensick	Peoria Rivermen	66	21	49	70	20
Keith Aucoin	Hershey Bears	43	11	59	70	34
Tyler Johnson	Norfolk Admirals	75	31	37	68	28
Trevor Smith	Norfolk Admirals	64	25	42	67	70
Travis Morin	Texas Stars	76	13	53	66	46
Ryan Potulny	Hershey Bears	61	33	32	65	32
Kris Newbury	Connecticut Whale	65	25	39	64	130

=== Leading goaltenders ===
The following goaltenders with a minimum 1500 minutes played led the league in goals against average.

GP = Games played; TOI = Time on ice (in minutes); SA = Shots against; GA = Goals against; SO = Shutouts; GAA = Goals against average; SV% = Save percentage; W = Wins; L = Losses; OT = Overtime/shootout loss

Player	Team	GP	TOI	SA	GA	SO	GAA	SV%	W	L	OT
Ben Scrivens	Toronto Marlies	39	2292	1052	78	4	2.04	0.926	22	15	1
Yann Danis	Oklahoma City Barons	43	2544	1165	88	5	2.07	0.924	26	14	2
Cedrick Desjardins	Lake Erie Monsters	32	1935	997	68	3	2.11	0.932	16	11	5
Jeremy Smith	Milwaukee Admirals	56	3283	1525	119	5	2.17	0.922	31	19	2
Dustin Tokarski	Norfolk Admirals	45	2582	1109	96	5	2.23	0.913	32	11	0

== Bracket ==
Conference quarterfinals
1	Norfolk	3
8	Manchester	1
2	St. John's	3
7	Syracuse	1
3	Bridgeport	0
6	Connecticut	3
4	Wilkes-Barre/Scranton	3
5	Hershey	2
1	Oklahoma City	3
8	Houston	1
2	Toronto	3
7	Rochester	0
3	Chicago	2
6	San Antonio	3
4	Abbotsford	3
5	Milwaukee	0

Conference semifinals
1	Norfolk	4
6	Connecticut	2
2	St. John's	4
4	Wilkes-Barre/Scranton	3
1	Oklahoma City	4
6	San Antonio	1
2	Toronto	4
4	Abbotsford	1

Conference finals
Eastern Conference
1	Norfolk	4
2	St. John's	0
Western Conference
1	Oklahoma City	1
2	Toronto	4

Calder Cup Final
E1	Norfolk	4
W2	Toronto	0

== AHL awards ==
Calder Cup : Norfolk Admirals
Les Cunningham Award : Cory Conacher, Norfolk
John B. Sollenberger Trophy : Chris Bourque, Hershey
Willie Marshall Award : Cory Conacher, Norfolk
Dudley "Red" Garrett Memorial Award : Cory Conacher, Norfolk
Eddie Shore Award : Mark Barberio, Norfolk
Aldege "Baz" Bastien Memorial Award : Yann Danis, Oklahoma City
Harry "Hap" Holmes Memorial Award : Ben Scrivens, Toronto
Louis A. R. Pieri Memorial Award : Jon Cooper, Norfolk
Fred T. Hunt Memorial Award : Chris Minard, Grand Rapids
Yanick Dupre Memorial Award : Nick Petrecki, Worcester
Jack A. Butterfield Trophy : Alexandre Picard, Norfolk
Richard F. Canning Trophy : Norfolk Admirals
Robert W. Clarke Trophy : Toronto Marlies
Macgregor Kilpatrick Trophy: Norfolk Admirals
Frank Mathers Trophy: Norfolk Admirals
Norman R. "Bud" Poile Trophy: Chicago Wolves
Emile Francis Trophy : St. John's IceCaps
F. G. "Teddy" Oke Trophy: Bridgeport Sound Tigers
Sam Pollock Trophy: Toronto Marlies
John D. Chick Trophy: Oklahoma City Barons
James C. Hendy Memorial Award: Glenn Stanford, St. John's
Thomas Ebright Memorial Award: Lyman G Bullard, Jr.
James H. Ellery Memorial Awards: Dave Eminian, Peoria (Newspaper), Pete Michaud, Norfolk (Radio), Aaron LaFontaine, Toronto (TV)
Ken McKenzie Award: Mike Lappan, Charlotte
Michael Condon Memorial Award: Bob Paquette

== Milestones ==
- On December 10, 2011, Chicago Wolves forward Darren Haydar recorded his 700th career AHL point. He became the 22nd player in league history to reach this milestone.
- On February 11, 2012, Worcester Sharks coach Roy Sommer recorded his 500th win as an AHL coach. He became the fourth coach in league history to reach this milestone.
- On March 18, 2012, the Norfolk Admirals broke the single-season consecutive wins record at 18, finishing the streak with 28 consecutive wins at the close of the season, the longest such streak in professional hockey worldwide. The previous record was set by the Philadelphia Phantoms in 2004–05.
- On March 25, 2012, Springfield Falcons forward Alexandre Giroux recorded his 700th career AHL point. He became the 23rd player in league history to reach this milestone.

== See also ==
- List of AHL seasons
- 2011 in ice hockey
- 2012 in ice hockey

Preceded by 2010–11 AHL season	AHL seasons	Succeeded by 2012–13 AHL season
