= 2006–07 AHL season =

- League: American Hockey League
- Sport: Ice hockey
- Duration: October 4, 2006 - April 15, 2007

Regular season
- Macgregor Kilpatrick Trophy: Hershey Bears
- Season MVP: Darren Haydar
- Top scorer: Darren Haydar

Playoffs
- Playoffs MVP: Carey Price

Calder Cup
- Champions: Hamilton Bulldogs
- Runners-up: Hershey Bears

AHL seasons
- 2005–06 2007–08

The 2006–07 AHL season was the 71st season of the American Hockey League. Twenty-seven teams played 80 games each in the schedule. The Hamilton Bulldogs won their first Calder Cup, defeating the defending champions, the Hershey Bears in the finals.

== Team changes ==
- The Lowell Lock Monsters are purchased by the New Jersey Devils, and renamed the Lowell Devils.
- The Cleveland Barons are relocated to Worcester, Massachusetts and renamed the Worcester Sharks, playing in the Atlantic Division.
- The Albany River Rats shift from the Atlantic Division to the East Division.

== Rules changes ==
The league mandated that players wear a hockey helmet with a visor, following research on eye injuries by Mayo Clinic physician Michael Stuart.

== Final standings ==
- y– indicates team clinched division and a playoff spot
- x– indicates team clinched a playoff spot
- e– indicates team was eliminated from playoff contention

=== Eastern Conference ===
Atlantic Division	GP	W	L	OTL	SOL	Pts	GF	GA
y–Manchester Monarchs (LAK)	80	51	21	7	1	110	242	182
x–Hartford Wolf Pack (NYR)	80	47	29	3	1	98	231	201
x–Providence Bruins (BOS)	80	44	30	2	4	94	251	218
x–Worcester Sharks (SJS)	80	41	28	3	8	93	247	244
e–Lowell Devils (NJD)	80	38	30	6	6	88	212	220
e–Portland Pirates (ANA)	80	37	31	3	9	86	225	232
e–Springfield Falcons (TBL)	80	28	49	1	2	59	181	268

East Division	GP	W	L	OTL	SOL	Pts	GF	GA
y–Hershey Bears (WSH)	80	51	17	6	6	114	305	219
x–Wilkes-Barre/Scranton Penguins (EDM/PIT)	80	51	23	2	4	108	276	221
x–Norfolk Admirals (CHI)	80	50	22	6	2	108	301	257
x–Albany River Rats (CAR/COL)	80	37	36	4	3	81	246	258
e–Bridgeport Sound Tigers (NYI)	80	36	37	1	6	79	229	267
e–Philadelphia Phantoms (PHI)	80	31	41	2	6	70	222	271
e–Binghamton Senators (OTT)	80	23	48	4	5	55	225	323

=== Western Conference ===
North Division	GP	W	L	OTL	SOL	Pts	GF	GA
y–Manitoba Moose (VAN)	80	45	23	7	5	102	232	201
x–Rochester Americans (BUF/FLA)	80	48	30	1	1	98	269	250
x–Hamilton Bulldogs (EDM/MTL)	80	43	28	3	6	95	243	208
x–Grand Rapids Griffins (DET/EDM)	80	37	32	6	5	85	226	244
e–Syracuse Crunch (CBJ)	80	34	34	4	8	80	250	248
e–Toronto Marlies (TOR)	80	34	39	2	5	75	220	270

West Division	GP	W	L	OTL	SOL	Pts	GF	GA
y–Omaha Ak-Sar-Ben Knights (CGY)	80	49	25	5	1	104	214	189
x–Chicago Wolves (ATL)	80	46	25	3	6	101	331	252
x–Milwaukee Admirals (EDM/NSH)	80	41	25	4	10	96	227	230
x–Iowa Stars (DAL/EDM)	80	42	34	3	1	88	221	231
e–Peoria Rivermen (STL)	80	37	33	2	8	84	221	242
e–San Antonio Rampage (PHX)	80	32	42	2	4	70	219	256
e–Houston Aeros (MIN)	80	27	43	4	6	64	205	269

== Scoring leaders ==
Note: GP = Games played; G = Goals; A = Assists; Pts = Points; PIM = Penalty minutes

Player	Team	GP	G	A	Pts	PIM
Darren Haydar	Chicago Wolves	73	41	81	122	55
Keith Aucoin	Albany River Rats	65	27	72	99	108
Martin St. Pierre	Norfolk Admirals	65	27	72	99	100
Brett Sterling	Chicago Wolves	77	55	42	97	96
Cory Larose	Chicago Wolves	63	22	61	83	75
Jason Jaffray	Manitoba Moose	77	35	46	81	75
Mathieu Darche	Worcester Sharks	76	35	45	80	72
Jason Krog	Chicago Wolves	44	26	54	80	20
Troy Brouwer	Norfolk Admirals	66	41	38	79	70
P. A. Parenteau	Portland Pirates / Norfolk Admirals	68	30	49	79	47

== Leading goaltenders ==
Note: GP = Games played; Mins = Minutes played; W = Wins; L = Losses; SL = Shootout losses; GA = Goals allowed; SO = Shutouts; GAA = Goals against average

Player	Team	GP	Mins	W	L	SL	GA	SO	SV%	GAA
Drew MacIntyre	Manitoba Moose	28	1618	16	11	0	54	6	.932	2.00
Curtis McElhinney	Omaha Ak-Sar-Ben Knights	57	3181	35	17	1	113	7	.917	2.13
Jaroslav Halak	Hamilton Bulldogs	41	2290	24	12	2	83	3	.922	2.17
Jason LaBarbera	Manchester Monarchs	62	3619	39	20	1	133	7	.933	2.21
Al Montoya	Hartford Wolf Pack	48	2556	27	17	0	98	6	.914	2.30

== Calder Cup Playoffs ==
Division Semi-finals	Division Finals
A1	Manchester	4
A4	Worcester	2
A1	Manchester	4
A3	Providence	2
A2	Hartford	3
A3	Providence	4
Eastern
E1	Hershey	4
E4	Albany	1
E1	Hershey	4
E2	WBS	1
E2	WBS	4
E3	Norfolk	2
N1	Manitoba	4
N4	Grand Rapids	3
N1	Manitoba	2
N3	Hamilton	4
N2	Rochester	2
N3	Hamilton	4
Western
W1	Omaha	2
W4	Iowa	4
W4	Iowa	2
W2	Chicago	4
W2	Chicago	4
W3	Milwaukee	0

Conference Finals
A1	Manchester	0
E1	Hershey	4
N3	Hamilton	4
W2	Chicago	1

Calder Cup Finals
E1	Hershey	1
N3	Hamilton	4

== All Star Classic ==
The 20th AHL All-Star Classic was played on January 29, 2007 at the Ricoh Coliseum in Toronto, Ontario. Team PlanetUSA defeated Team Canada 7–6. In the skills competition held the night before, Team PlanetUSA defeated Team Canada 19–14.

== Trophy and award winners ==
=== Team awards ===
Calder Cup; Playoff champions:	Hamilton Bulldogs
Richard F. Canning Trophy; Eastern Conference playoff champions:	Hershey Bears
Robert W. Clarke Trophy; Western Conference playoff champions:	Hamilton Bulldogs
Macgregor Kilpatrick Trophy; Regular season champions, League:	Hershey Bears
Frank Mathers Trophy; Regular season champions, Eastern Conference:	Hershey Bears
Norman R. "Bud" Poile Trophy; Regular season champions, Western Conference:	Omaha Ak-Sar-Ben Knights
Emile Francis Trophy; Regular season champions, Atlantic Division:	Manchester Monarchs
F. G. "Teddy" Oke Trophy; Regular season champions, East Division:	Hershey Bears
Sam Pollock Trophy; Regular season champions, North Division:	Manitoba Moose
John D. Chick Trophy; Regular season champions, West Division:	Omaha Ak-Sar-Ben Knights

=== Individual awards ===
Les Cunningham Award; Most valuable player:	Darren Haydar – Chicago Wolves
John B. Sollenberger Trophy; Top point scorer:	Darren Haydar – Chicago Wolves
Willie Marshall Award; Top goal scorer:	Brett Sterling – Chicago Wolves
Dudley "Red" Garrett Memorial Award; Rookie of the year:	Brett Sterling – Chicago Wolves
Eddie Shore Award; Defenceman of the year:	Sheldon Brookbank – Milwaukee Admirals
Aldege "Baz" Bastien Memorial Award; Best goaltender:	Jason LaBarbera – Manchester Monarchs
Harry "Hap" Holmes Memorial Award; Lowest goals against average:	Jason LaBarbera – Manchester Monarchs
Louis A.R. Pieri Memorial Award; Coach of the year:	Mike Haviland – Norfolk Admirals
Fred T. Hunt Memorial Award; Sportsmanship / Perseverance:	Mike Keane – Manitoba Moose
Yanick Dupre Memorial Award; Community Service Award:	Matt Carkner – Wilkes-Barre/Scranton Penguins
Jack A. Butterfield Trophy; MVP of the playoffs:	Carey Price – Hamilton Bulldogs

=== Other awards ===
James C. Hendy Memorial Award; Most outstanding executive:	Jon Greenberg, Milwaukee Admirals
Thomas Ebright Memorial Award; Career contributions:	Frank Miceli
James H. Ellery Memorial Awards; Outstanding media coverage:	Bill Ballou, Worcester, (newspaper); John Bartlett, Toronto, (radio); Mark Giangreco, Chicago, (television)
Ken McKenzie Award; Outstanding marketing executive:	Randy Cleves, Grand Rapids Griffins
Michael Condon Memorial Award; Outstanding service, on-ice official:	Leo Boylan

== See also ==
- List of AHL seasons
- 2006 in ice hockey
- 2007 in ice hockey

Preceded by 2005–06 AHL season	AHL seasons	Succeeded by 2007–08 AHL season
