= 2017–18 AHL season =

- League: American Hockey League
- Sport: Ice hockey
- Duration: October 6, 2017 – April 15, 2018

Regular season
- Macgregor Kilpatrick Trophy: Toronto Marlies
- Season MVP: Phil Varone (Lehigh Valley)
- Top scorer: Chris Terry (Laval)

Playoffs
- Playoffs MVP: Andreas Johnsson (Toronto)

Calder Cup
- Champions: Toronto Marlies
- Runners-up: Texas Stars

AHL seasons
- 2016–17 2018–19

The 2017–18 AHL season was the 82nd season of the American Hockey League. The regular season ran from October 6, 2017, to April 15, 2018. The 2018 Calder Cup playoffs followed the conclusion of the regular season. The Toronto Marlies won their first Calder Cup in seven games over the Texas Stars.

== League changes ==
The AHL's only alignment change was moving the Charlotte Checkers from the Central Division of the Western Conference to the Atlantic Division of the Eastern Conference, significantly decreasing their interdivisional travel and balancing the two conferences' members. Similar to the season scheduling in the previous season, the six California and Arizona based teams continued to have a 68-game season while the rest of the AHL teams play a 76-game season.

=== Team and NHL affiliation changes ===
The National Hockey League added the Vegas Golden Knights for the 2017–18 season. The Las Vegas management confirmed that the organization would also have an AHL affiliate in their first season, although it was not stated whether the AHL team would be an expansion or relocation. The organization looked into adding an affiliate on the West Coast with the leading candidates being Salt Lake City, Reno, or Fresno. However, as the season went on, they looked into co-affiliations with a pre-existing AHL team since the new NHL team would likely not have a large amount of drafted talent to fully stock an AHL roster. In February 2017, AHL commissioner David Andrews later stated that there was a "50-50 chance" of a 31st team being established for the 2017–18 season.

Other than the Golden Knights adding a team, there were also reports in November 2016 of the St. Louis Blues adding an expansion team in Kansas City. This would later be denied by the announced potential owner in Kansas City, Lamar Hunt Jr., in a press release from his ECHL team in the area, the Missouri Mavericks, and further denied by AHL commissioner, David Andrews, after the January 2017 Board of Governors meeting. In May 2017, the 30 team alignment was confirmed and there would be no expansion for 2017–18. The Golden Knights signed a multi-year affiliation with the Chicago Wolves, replacing the Blues as their primary affiliate. The Blues also announced that they would continue to send players to the Wolves for that season, as well as to the San Antonio Rampage, the AHL team that they would affiliate with for 2018–19.

The league confirmed after the 2017 Board of Governors meeting that it had made a commitment to an expansion applicant for a 31st team for the 2018–19 season later revealed to be the Colorado Eagles. The Eagles had been a member of the ECHL prior to the promotion and the affiliate of the Colorado Avalanche. The Eagles join other recent ECHL markets in the AHL such as Bakersfield, Charlotte, Ontario, and Stockton.

==== Relocations ====
- The Albany Devils relocated to become the Binghamton Devils to replace the Binghamton Senators.
- The Binghamton Senators were purchased by their parent club, the Ottawa Senators, and relocated to Belleville, Ontario, as the Belleville Senators.
- The Montreal Canadiens' AHL franchise, then operating as the St. John's IceCaps, was relocated to the Montreal suburb of Laval, Quebec, as the Laval Rocket. Danny Williams, owner of the IceCaps team but not a franchise holder, announced on the same day his intentions to find another AHL franchise to replace the Canadiens' owned franchise. A separate ownership group bought an ECHL expansion team called the Newfoundland Growlers a season later.

==== Affiliation changes ====
AHL team	New affiliate	Old affiliate
Chicago Wolves	Vegas Golden Knights	St. Louis Blues (Note: Although the Blues would no longer be the Wolves' primary NHL affiliate, they would continue to send players to the Wolves as an unofficial affiliate.)

== Final standings ==
Final standings:

y– indicates team clinched division and a playoff spot
x– indicates team clinched a playoff spot
e– indicates team was eliminated from playoff contention

=== Eastern Conference ===
Atlantic Division	GP	W	L	OTL	SOL	Pts	Pts%	GF	GA
y – Lehigh Valley Phantoms (PHI)	76	47	19	5	5	104	.684	260	218
x – Wilkes-Barre/Scranton Penguins (PIT)	76	45	22	6	3	99	.651	252	223
x – Charlotte Checkers (CAR)	76	46	26	1	3	96	.632	262	212
x – Providence Bruins (BOS)	76	45	26	3	2	95	.625	231	187
e – Bridgeport Sound Tigers (NYI)	76	36	32	5	3	80	.526	206	214
e – Hartford Wolf Pack (NYR)	76	34	33	6	3	77	.507	208	252
e – Springfield Thunderbirds (FLA)	76	32	37	5	2	71	.467	210	233
e – Hershey Bears (WSH)	76	30	37	4	5	69	.454	201	249

North Division	GP	W	L	OTL	SOL	Pts	Pts%	GF	GA
y – Toronto Marlies (TOR)	76	54	18	2	2	112	.737	254	170
x – Syracuse Crunch (TBL)	76	46	22	3	5	100	.658	234	189
x – Rochester Americans (BUF)	76	37	22	11	6	91	.599	234	221
x – Utica Comets (VAN)	76	38	26	8	4	88	.579	211	216
e – Binghamton Devils (NJD)	76	25	38	9	4	63	.414	193	247
e – Belleville Senators (OTT)	76	29	42	2	3	63	.414	194	266
e – Laval Rocket (MTL)	76	24	42	7	3	58	.382	206	281

=== Western Conference ===
Central Division	GP	W	L	OTL	SOL	Pts	Pts%	GF	GA
y – Chicago Wolves (STL/VGK)	76	42	23	7	4	95	.625	244	208
x – Grand Rapids Griffins (DET)	76	42	25	2	7	93	.612	237	210
x – Manitoba Moose (WPG)	76	42	26	4	4	92	.605	253	198
x – Rockford IceHogs (CHI)	76	40	28	4	4	88	.579	239	234
e – Iowa Wild (MIN)	76	33	27	10	6	82	.539	232	246
e – Milwaukee Admirals (NSH)	76	38	32	4	2	82	.539	216	235
e – Cleveland Monsters (CBJ)	76	25	41	7	3	60	.395	190	258

Pacific Division	GP	W	L	OTL	SOL	Pts	Pts%	GF	GA
y – Tucson Roadrunners (ARI)	68	42	20	5	1	90	.662	214	173
x – Texas Stars (DAL)	76	38	24	8	6	90	.592	223	231
x – Ontario Reign (LAK)	68	36	25	4	3	79	.581	200	194
x – San Jose Barracuda (SJS)	68	34	26	4	4	76	.559	186	198
e – San Diego Gulls (ANA)	68	36	28	3	1	76	.559	202	197
e – Stockton Heat (CGY)	68	34	28	2	4	74	.544	211	204
e – Bakersfield Condors (EDM)	68	31	27	9	1	72	.529	188	206
e – San Antonio Rampage (COL/STL)	76	35	31	10	0	80	.526	198	219

== Statistical leaders ==
=== Leading skaters ===
The following players are sorted by points, then goals. Updated as of April 15, 2018.

GP = Games played; G = Goals; A = Assists; Pts = Points; +/– = P Plus–minus; PIM = Penalty minutes

Player	Team	GP	G	A	Pts	PIM
Chris Terry	Laval Rocket	62	32	39	71	45
Phil Varone	Lehigh Valley Phantoms	74	23	47	70	36
Austin Czarnik	Providence Bruins	64	25	44	69	24
Mason Appleton	Manitoba Moose	76	22	44	66	57
Daniel Sprong	Wilkes-Barre/Scranton Penguins	65	32	33	65	28
Teemu Pulkkinen	Chicago Wolves	75	29	36	65	44
Ben Street	Grand Rapids Griffins	73	21	44	65	22
Eric Tangradi	Grand Rapids Griffins	74	31	33	64	51
Cal O'Reilly	Iowa Wild	75	15	49	64	10
Curtis Valk	Springfield Thunderbirds	73	20	42	62	41

=== Leading goaltenders ===
The following goaltenders with a minimum 1440 minutes played lead the league in goals against average. Updated as of April 15, 2018.

GP = Games played; TOI = Time on ice (in minutes); SA = Shots against; GA = Goals against; SO = Shutouts; GAA = Goals against average; SV% = Save percentage; W = Wins; L = Losses; OT = Overtime/shootout loss

Player	Team	GP	TOI	SA	GA	SO	GAA	SV%	W	L	OT
Garret Sparks	Toronto Marlies	43	2507:04	1181	75	6	1.79	.936	31	9	2
Jordan Binnington	Providence Bruins	28	1605:53	744	55	1	2.05	.926	17	9	1
Michael Hutchinson	Manitoba Moose	26	1560:32	831	54	2	2.08	.935	17	5	4
Edward Pasquale	Bakersfield/Syracuse	31	1782:18	842	65	2	2.19	.923	16	6	7
Adin Hill	Tucson Roadrunners	36	1949:57	863	74	5	2.28	.914	19	11	4

== Calder Cup playoffs ==
=== Playoff format ===
The 2018 Calder Cup playoffs format was retained from the divisional format of the 2017 Calder Cup playoffs. The playoff format was finalized at the Annual Board of Governors meeting that took place July 2017. During the regular season, teams receive two points for a win and one point for an overtime or shootout loss. The top four teams in each division ranked by points percentage (points earned divided by points available) qualify for the 2017 Calder Cup playoffs.

The 2018 Calder Cup playoffs features a divisional playoff format, leading to conference finals and ultimately the Calder Cup finals. The division semifinals are best-of-five series; all subsequent rounds are best-of-seven.

=== Bracket ===
Division semifinals	Division finals
A1	Lehigh Valley	3
A4	Providence	1
A1	Lehigh Valley	4
A3	Charlotte	1
A2	Wilkes-Barre/Scranton	0
A3	Charlotte	3
Eastern Conference
N1	Toronto	3
N4	Utica	2
N1	Toronto	4
N2	Syracuse	0
N2	Syracuse	3
N3	Rochester	0
C1	Chicago	0
C4	Rockford	3
C4	Rockford	4
C3	Manitoba	0
C2	Grand Rapids	2
C3	Manitoba	3
Western Conference
P1	Tucson	3
P4	San Jose	1
P1	Tucson	1
P2	Texas	4
P2	Texas	3
P3	Ontario	1

Conference finals
A1	Lehigh Valley	0
N1	Toronto	4
C4	Rockford	2
P2	Texas	4

Calder Cup final
N1	Toronto	4
P2	Texas	3

== AHL awards ==
Award	Winner
Calder Cup :	Toronto Marlies
Les Cunningham Award :	Phil Varone, Lehigh Valley
John B. Sollenberger Trophy :	Chris Terry, Laval
Willie Marshall Award :	Valentin Zykov, Charlotte
Dudley "Red" Garrett Memorial Award :	Mason Appleton, Manitoba
Eddie Shore Award :	Sami Niku, Manitoba
Aldege "Baz" Bastien Memorial Award :	Garret Sparks, Toronto
Harry "Hap" Holmes Memorial Award :	Garret Sparks and Calvin Pickard, Toronto
Louis A. R. Pieri Memorial Award :	Pascal Vincent, Manitoba
Fred T. Hunt Memorial Award :	Bracken Kearns, Binghamton
Yanick Dupre Memorial Award :	Scooter Vaughan, Chicago
Jack A. Butterfield Trophy :	Andreas Johnsson, Toronto
Richard F. Canning Trophy :	Toronto Marlies
Robert W. Clarke Trophy :	Texas Stars
Macgregor Kilpatrick Trophy: (regular season champions)	Toronto Marlies
Frank Mathers Trophy: (Eastern Conference regular season champions)	Toronto Marlies
Norman R. "Bud" Poile Trophy: (Western Conference regular season champions)	Tucson Roadrunners
Emile Francis Trophy : (Atlantic Division regular season champions)	Lehigh Valley Phantoms
F. G. "Teddy" Oke Trophy: (North Division regular season champions)	Toronto Marlies
Sam Pollock Trophy: (Central Division regular season champions)	Chicago Wolves
John D. Chick Trophy: (Pacific Division regular season champions)	Tucson Roadrunners
James C. Hendy Memorial Award:	Tim Gortsema, Grand Rapids
Thomas Ebright Memorial Award:	Wendell Young, Chicago
James H. Ellery Memorial Awards:	Ben Birnell, Utica
Ken McKenzie Award:	Pam Frasco, Cleveland
Michael Condon Memorial Award:	Frank Murphy
President's Awards:	Organization: Toronto; Player: Mike McKenna

=== All-Star teams ===
First All-Star Team

- Garret Sparks (G) – Toronto
- Jacob MacDonald (D) – Binghamton
- Sami Niku (D) – Manitoba
- Mason Appleton (F) – Manitoba
- Chris Terry (F) – Laval
- Phil Varone (F) – Lehigh Valley

Second All-Star Team

- Michael Hutchinson (G) – Manitoba
- T. J. Brennan (D) – Lehigh Valley
- Zach Redmond (D) – Rochester
- Austin Czarnik (F) – Providence
- Andreas Johnsson (F) – Toronto
- Ben Smith (F) – Toronto

All-Rookie Team

- Ville Husso (G) – San Antonio
- Filip Hronek (D) – Grand Rapids
- Sami Niku (D) – Manitoba
- Mason Appleton (F) – Manitoba
- Daniel Sprong (F) – Wilkes-Barre/Scranton
- Dylan Strome (F) – Tucson

== See also ==
- List of AHL seasons
- 2017 in ice hockey
- 2018 in ice hockey

Preceded by 2016–17	AHL seasons	Succeeded by 2018–19
