= James Clark =

James, Jim, Jimmy, or Jamie Clark may refer to:

== Crime ==
- James Clark (lynching victim) (died 1926), accused of rape, lynched by a mob of white men
- James Lee Clark (1968–2007), convicted killer, executed by the state of Texas
- Jim Clark (criminal) (1902–1974), American bank robber and Depression-era outlaw
- James Clark (criminal) (1902–1974), Depression-era bank robber known as "Oklahoma Jack"

== Entertainment ==
- James Clark (artist) (1858–1943), English painter
- James B. Clark (filmmaker) (1908–2000), American film and television director
- Jim Clark (film editor) (1931–2016), British film editor and director
- Jimmy Clark (tap dancer) (1922–2009), member of the tap dancing duo The Clark Brothers

== Politics ==
=== U.S. ===
- Champ Clark (James Beauchamp Clark, 1850–1921), Speaker of the US House of Representatives, 1911–1919
- James Clark Jr. (1918–2006), Maryland State Senate president
- James Clark (Kentucky politician) (1779–1839), Governor of Kentucky, 1836–1839
- James Clark (Pennsylvania politician) (born 1952), Pennsylvania politician
- James Clark (Minnesota politician) (born 1963), member of the Minnesota House of Representatives
- James P. Clark (1899–1962), American political boss, sportsman, and businessman
- James S. Clark (1921–2000), Alabama politician
- James Waddey Clark (1877–1939), Justice of the Oklahoma Supreme Court from 1925 to 1933
- James West Clark (1779–1843), North Carolina congressman
- Jim Clark (Alaska official) (born 1943), former chief of staff to Alaska Governor Frank Murkowski

=== Elsewhere ===
- James Johnston Clark (1809–1891), Unionist MP for County Londonderry, Ireland
- James Lenox-Conyngham Chichester-Clark (1884–1933), MP in Northern Ireland
- James Clark (businessman) (1833–1898), mayor of Auckland, New Zealand
- James B. Clark (Canadian politician) (1867–1943), from Ontario
- James Clark (Ontario politician) (1888–1952), Speaker of the Ontario Legislature, 1939–1943
- Jim Clark (Australian politician) (1891–1963), member of the Queensland Legislative Assembly
- James Chichester-Clark (1923–2002), Prime Minister of Northern Ireland, 1969–1971
- James Clark (British diplomat) (born 1963), Ambassador to Luxembourg
- James Clark (Dunedin mayor) (1870–1936), New Zealand politician

== Sports ==
=== Baseball and cricket ===
- Jim Clark (infielder) (1927–1990), American baseball infielder
- Jim Clark (1910s outfielder) (1887–1969), American baseball outfielder
- Jim Clark (1970s outfielder) (1947–2019), American baseball outfielder
- James Clark (Australian cricketer) (1871–1941), Australian cricketer
- James Clark (New Zealand cricketer) (1910–2003), New Zealand cricketer known as Bernie Clark
- James Clark Baker (1866–1939), New Zealand cricketer known as James Clark for some of his life

=== Football and rugby ===
- James Clark (American football) (1904–1977), American football player
- Jim Clark (offensive lineman) (1929–2000), American football player
- Jim Clark (American football coach) (born, c. 1926), American football coach
- Jim Clark (Australian footballer) (1925–2013), in the Victorian Football League
- Jimmy Clark (footballer, born 1913) (1913–?), Scottish professional footballer
- Jim Clark (Scottish footballer) (1923–1994), Scottish footballer
- Jamie Clark (footballer) (born 1976), Scottish soccer coach and former footballer
- Jimmy Clark (rugby union) (1908–1979), Australian national rugby union team captain
- Jim Clark (rugby league) (fl. 1913–1927), a New Zealand rugby league player
- Jamie Clark (rugby league) (born 1987), English rugby league player
- James Clark (footballer, born 2001), English footballer

=== Other sports ===
- Jimmy Clark (boxer) (1914–1994), American Olympic boxer
- Jimmy Clark (golfer) (1920–2010), American professional golfer
- James Clark (sport shooter) (born 1936), American Olympic shooter
- Jim Clark (1936–1968), Scottish Formula one world drivers' champion in the 1960s
- Jim Clark (rower) (born 1950), British rower
- James Clark (shinty) (born 1973), shinty player from Invergarry, Scotland
- James Clark (water polo) (born 1991), Australian water polo goalkeeper
- James Clark (athlete), marathon runner
- Jim Clark (ice hockey) (born 1954), director of scouting for the Ottawa Senators

== Other ==
- James Clark (physician in Dominica) (1737–1819), Scottish doctor and plantation owner
- Sir James Clark, 1st Baronet (1788–1870), royal physician to Queen Victoria
- James Clark (Jesuit) (1809–1885), an American Catholic priest and Jesuit
- James Clark (college president) (1812–1892), president of Washington College
- James Clark (horticulturist) (1825–1890), English potato breeder
- James Clark (Bible Christian) (1830–1905), English minister and activist
- James G. Clark (Medal of Honor) (1843–1911), American Civil War soldier
- James L. Clark (1883–1969), American natural history scientist
- James A. Clark Sr. (1886–1955), judge in Maryland
- Jim Clark (sheriff) (James Gardner Clark Jr., 1922–2007), Dallas County, Alabama sheriff
- A. James Clark (1927–2015), American construction executive and philanthropist
- James H. Clark (born 1944), Internet entrepreneur
- James Clark (programmer) (born 1964), computer programmer
- James B. Clark Jr. (1957–1996), American executed for the murder of his adoptive parents
- Jamie Rappaport Clark (born 1957/8), president and CEO of Defenders of Wildlife

== See also ==
- James Clarke (disambiguation)
- James B. Clark (disambiguation)
- Clark (surname)
