= 2019–20 AHL season =

- League: American Hockey League
- Sport: Ice hockey
- Duration: October 4, 2019 – March 12, 2020

Regular season
- Macgregor Kilpatrick Trophy: Milwaukee Admirals (2nd overall)
- Season MVP: Gerald Mayhew (Iowa)
- Top scorer: Sam Anas (Iowa)

AHL seasons
- 2018–19 2020–21

The 2019–20 AHL season was the 84th season of the American Hockey League. The regular season began October 4, 2019, and was officially cancelled on May 11, 2020. The 2020 Calder Cup playoffs, which was also cancelled, would have followed the conclusion of the regular season. The league suspended play on March 12, 2020, due to the COVID-19 pandemic in North America, and was not able to resume play. The Milwaukee Admirals claimed the league's regular-season trophy, the Macgregor Kilpatrick Trophy, their second regular-season championship.

This was the final season under David Andrews' 26-year tenure as the president of the league. He was succeeded by Scott Howson.

== League changes ==
For the first time since 2012, there were no team changes in the offseason. The league also retained the same four division alignment of 31 teams, with teams in each division playing 76 games except for the seven-team Pacific Division with 68 games each. The Macgregor Kilpatrick Trophy for the regular season champion was awarded based on points percentage.

=== Coaching changes ===
Off–season
Team	2018–19 coach	2019–20 coach	Notes
Charlotte Checkers	Mike Vellucci	Ryan Warsofsky	Vellucci left for the WBS Penguins head coaching position after leading the Checkers to the 2019 Calder Cup. Warsofsky was promoted from the assistant coaching position.
Cleveland Monsters	John Madden	Mike Eaves	Madden resigned after three seasons and one playoff appearance. He was replaced by Eaves, a longtime Wisconsin Badgers head coach, but most recently with Div. III St. Olaf College.
Hartford Wolf Pack	Keith McCambridge	Kris Knoblauch	McCambridge was fired after two seasons and never making the playoffs. Knoblauch was hired after serving as a Philadelphia Flyers assistant following several seasons as a head coach in major juniors.
Rochester Americans	Chris Taylor	Gord Dineen (Note: Interim)	Taylor was called up to the Buffalo Sabres as an interim assistant coach when Don Granato had to take a medical leave of absence days before the season was to start. Dineen was named interim head coach of the Americans.
San Diego Gulls	Dallas Eakins	Kevin Dineen	Eakins was promoted to head coach of the Anaheim Ducks. Dineen was hired on July 15, 2019, after serving as an assistant with the Chicago Blackhawks. Dineen had previously been the head coach of the Portland Pirates in the AHL and the Florida Panthers in the NHL.
Wilkes-Barre/Scranton Penguins	Clark Donatelli	Mike Vellucci	The Penguins hired Vellucci after his successful stint with the Charlotte Checkers and Donatelli resigned.
In-season
Team	Outgoing coach	Incoming coach	Notes
Rochester Americans	Gord Dineen	Chris Taylor	Following Don Granato's return to his assistant coach position with the Buffalo Sabres, Taylor returned to his head coach position with the Americans. Dineen had a record of 11–3–1–2 as interim head coach of the Americans.
San Jose Barracuda	Roy Sommer	Jimmy Bonneau; Michael Chiasson	The San Jose Sharks fired head coach Peter DeBoer on December 11, 2019, promoted assistant coach Bob Boughner to the position of head coach, and brought up Sommer as an associate coach for the Sharks. Sommer had been head coach of the Sharks' AHL affiliate since first being named to the position with the Kentucky Thoroughblades on May 28, 1998, and had a record of 772–743–122. Assistant coaches Bonneau and Chiasson were named as co-coaches of the Barracuda.
Texas Stars	Derek Laxdal	Neil Graham	The Dallas Stars fired head coach Jim Montgomery on December 10, 2019 due to unprofessional conduct, which resulted in the promotion of assistant coach Rick Bowness to interim head coach. This move resulted in Laxdal being promoted to the assistant coach role that was vacated by Bowness. Laxdal had a record of 198–152–55 as head coach of the Texas Stars since being hired in 2014. Texas Stars assistant coach and former Idaho Steelheads head coach Neil Graham was named as Laxdal's replacement on December 10.
Toronto Marlies	Sheldon Keefe	Greg Moore	On November 20, 2019, Keefe was promoted to the head coach of the Toronto Maple Leafs after Mike Babcock was fired. Moore was named the next head coach of the Marlies on December 1.

== Final standings ==
=== Eastern Conference ===
Final standings as of March 11, 2020

Atlantic Division	GP	W	L	OTL	SOL	Pts	Pts%	GF	GA
Providence Bruins (BOS)	62	38	18	3	3	82	.661	197	154
Hershey Bears (WSH)	62	37	18	3	4	81	.653	187	157
Charlotte Checkers (CAR)	61	34	22	5	0	73	.598	202	172
Hartford Wolf Pack (NYR)	62	31	20	6	5	73	.589	171	173
Wilkes-Barre/Scranton Penguins (PIT)	63	29	26	3	5	66	.524	164	193
Springfield Thunderbirds (FLA)	61	31	27	3	0	65	.533	190	186
Lehigh Valley Phantoms (PHI)	62	24	28	3	7	58	.468	161	186
Bridgeport Sound Tigers (NYI)	63	23	33	5	2	53	.421	152	206

North Division	GP	W	L	OTL	SOL	Pts	Pts%	GF	GA
Belleville Senators (OTT)	63	38	20	4	1	81	.643	234	197
Rochester Americans (BUF)	62	33	20	4	5	75	.605	181	173
Utica Comets (VAN)	61	34	22	3	2	73	.598	210	186
Binghamton Devils (NJD)	62	34	24	4	0	72	.581	189	182
Syracuse Crunch (TBL)	62	30	23	4	5	69	.556	202	210
Laval Rocket (MTL)	62	30	24	5	3	68	.548	183	182
Toronto Marlies (TOR)	61	29	27	3	2	63	.516	206	212
Cleveland Monsters (CBJ)	62	24	31	5	2	55	.444	159	192

=== Western Conference ===
Final standings as of March 11, 2020

Central Division	GP	W	L	OTL	SOL	Pts	Pts%	GF	GA
Milwaukee Admirals (NSH)	63	41	14	5	3	90	.714	211	141
Iowa Wild (MIN)	63	37	18	4	4	82	.651	194	171
Grand Rapids Griffins (DET)	63	29	27	3	4	65	.516	177	193
Chicago Wolves (VGK)	61	27	26	5	3	62	.508	155	175
Rockford IceHogs (CHI)	63	29	30	2	2	62	.492	156	187
Texas Stars (DAL)	62	27	28	3	4	61	.492	171	192
San Antonio Rampage (STL)	61	24	25	7	5	60	.492	161	184
Manitoba Moose (WPG)	61	27	33	1	0	55	.451	160	190

Pacific Division	GP	W	L	OTL	SOL	Pts	Pts%	GF	GA
Tucson Roadrunners (ARI)	58	36	19	1	2	75	.647	198	163
Colorado Eagles (COL)	56	34	18	3	1	72	.643	188	162
Stockton Heat (CGY)	55	30	17	4	4	68	.618	194	170
San Diego Gulls (ANA)	57	30	19	6	2	68	.596	185	164
Ontario Reign (LAK)	57	29	22	5	1	64	.561	166	198
Bakersfield Condors (EDM)	56	21	27	5	3	50	.446	162	202
San Jose Barracuda (SJS)	55	21	27	5	2	49	.445	179	192

== Statistical leaders ==
=== Leading skaters ===
The following players are sorted by points, then goals. Final as of March 11, 2020.

GP = Games played; G = Goals; A = Assists; Pts = Points; +/– = P Plus–minus; PIM = Penalty minutes

Player	Team	GP	G	A	Pts	PIM
Sam Anas	Iowa Wild	63	20	50	70	10
Reid Boucher	Utica Comets	53	34	33	67	45
Gerald Mayhew	Iowa Wild	49	39	22	61	68
Josh Norris	Belleville Senators	56	31	30	61	21
Alex Barre-Boulet	Syracuse Crunch	60	27	29	56	22
Drake Batherson	Belleville Senators	44	16	38	54	24
Alex Formenton	Belleville Senators	61	27	26	53	65
Brayden Burke	Tucson Roadrunners	51	21	31	52	34
Chris Terry	Grand Rapids Griffins	57	21	30	51	32
Daniel Carr	Milwaukee Admirals	47	23	27	50	20

=== Leading goaltenders ===
The following goaltenders with a minimum 1200 minutes played lead the league in goals against average. Final as of March 11, 2020.

GP = Games played; TOI = Time on ice (in minutes); SA = Shots against; GA = Goals against; SO = Shutouts; GAA = Goals against average; SV% = Save percentage; W = Wins; L = Losses; OT = Overtime/shootout loss

Player	Team	GP	TOI	SA	GA	SO	GAA	SV%	W	L	OT
Daniel Vladar	Providence Bruins	25	1407:08	656	42	3	1.79	.936	14	7	1
Igor Shesterkin	Hartford Wolf Pack	25	1454:37	698	46	3	1.90	.934	17	4	3
Connor Ingram	Milwaukee Admirals	33	1905:41	913	61	2	1.92	.933	21	5	5
Kaapo Kahkonen	Iowa Wild	34	2058:20	972	71	7	2.07	.927	25	6	3
Vitek Vanecek	Hershey Bears	31	1832:11	827	69	2	2.26	.917	19	10	1

== Calder Cup playoffs ==
2020 Calder Cup playoffs

The 2020 Calder Cup playoffs was a planned playoff tournament following the conclusion of the regular season to determine the champions of the American Hockey League. On May 11, 2020, American Hockey League President and Chief Executive Officer David Andrews cancelled the remainder of the season and the Calder Cup playoffs due to the COVID-19 pandemic. It is the first time in league history that the Calder Cup was not awarded.

== AHL awards ==
Award	Winner
Calder Cup	Not awarded
Les Cunningham Award	Gerald Mayhew, Iowa Wild
John B. Sollenberger Trophy	Sam Anas, Iowa Wild
Willie Marshall Award	Gerald Mayhew, Iowa Wild
Dudley "Red" Garrett Memorial Award	Josh Norris, Belleville Senators
Eddie Shore Award	Jake Bean, Charlotte Checkers
Aldege "Baz" Bastien Memorial Award	Kaapo Kahkonen, Iowa Wild
Harry "Hap" Holmes Memorial Award	Troy Grosenick & Connor Ingram, Milwaukee Admirals
Louis A. R. Pieri Memorial Award	Karl Taylor, Milwaukee Admirals
Fred T. Hunt Memorial Award	John McCarthy, San Jose Barracuda
Yanick Dupre Memorial Award	Troy Grosenick, Milwaukee Admirals
Jack A. Butterfield Trophy	Not awarded
Richard F. Canning Trophy	Not awarded
Robert W. Clarke Trophy	Not awarded
Macgregor Kilpatrick Trophy	Milwaukee Admirals
Frank Mathers Trophy (Eastern Conference regular season champions)	Providence Bruins
Norman R. "Bud" Poile Trophy (Western Conference regular season champions)	Milwaukee Admirals
Emile Francis Trophy (Atlantic Division regular season champions)	Providence Bruins
F. G. "Teddy" Oke Trophy (North Division regular season champions)	Belleville Senators
Sam Pollock Trophy (Central Division regular season champions)	Milwaukee Admirals
John D. Chick Trophy (Pacific Division regular season champions)	Tucson Roadrunners
James C. Hendy Memorial Award	Frank Miceli
Thomas Ebright Memorial Award	David Andrews
James H. Ellery Memorial Awards	Larry Figurski
Ken McKenzie Award	Allie Brown, Iowa Wild
Michael Condon Memorial Award	Peter Feola
President's Awards	Organization: Charlotte Checkers; Player:

=== All-Star teams ===
First All-Star Team

- Kaapo Kahkonen (G) – Iowa
- Jake Bean (D) – Charlotte
- Brennan Menell (D) – Iowa
- Reid Boucher (F) – Utica
- Josh Norris (F) – Belleville
- Sam Anas (F) – Iowa

Second All-Star Team

- Connor Ingram (G) – Milwaukee
- Jacob MacDonald (D) – Colorado
- Brogan Rafferty (D) – Utica
- Gerald Mayhew (F) – Iowa
- Alex Barre-Boulet (F) – Syracuse
- Drake Batherson (F) – Belleville

All-Rookie Team

- Cayden Primeau (G) – Laval
- Joey Keane (D) – Hartford/Charlotte
- Brogan Rafferty (D) – Utica
- Alex Formenton (F) – Belleville
- Josh Norris (F) – Belleville
- Jack Studnicka (F) – Providence

== See also ==
- List of AHL seasons
- 2019 in ice hockey
- 2020 in ice hockey

Preceded by 2018–19	AHL seasons	Succeeded by 2020–21
