= James Clarke =

James Clarke may refer to:

== Entertainment ==
- James P. Clarke (composer) (1807/8–1877), Canadian composer
- James Kenelm Clarke (1941–2020), British film director, producer and composer
- James Clarke (composer) (born 1957), British composer
- James Clarke (author) (born 1972), cinema author

== Politics ==
- James Clarke (Iowa politician) (1812–1850), American politician and Governor of Iowa Territory
- James C. Clarke (1823–1902), American politician and railroad executive from Maryland
- James Paul Clarke (1854–1916), American politician from Arkansas
- James M. Clarke (1917–1999), American politician and farmer from North Carolina
- James Clarke, leader of the Renew Party in the United Kingdom
- Jim Clarke (Northern Ireland politician), Unionist politician in Northern Ireland
- James Clarke (died 1599), English MP for Leicester
- James Clarke (died 1612), English MP for Mitchell
- James Clarke (died 1621), English MP for Taunton
- James Maitland Clarke, Canadian politician

== Sports ==
- James Clarke (athlete) (1874–1929), Irish Olympic tug of war competitor
- James Clarke (footballer, born 1913), English footballer for Bradford City and Rotherham United
- James Clarke (footballer, born 1923) (1923–2014), English footballer for Nottingham Forest
- James Clarke (footballer, born 1989), English footballer for Bristol Rovers and Newport County
- James Clarke (footballer, born 2000), Irish footballer for Boreham Wood
- James Clarke (footballer, born 2001), Irish footballer for Derry City
- James Clarke (footballer, born 2006), English footballer for Rotherham United
- James Clarke (cricketer) (born 1979), English cricketer
- James Clarke (rower) (born 1984), British lightweight rower
- Jamie Clarke (footballer, born 1982), English footballer for Rochdale and Grimsby Town
- Jim Clarke (Gaelic footballer), played for Donegal
- Jim Clarke (ice hockey) (born 1954), Canadian defenceman

== Other ==
- James Clarke (antiquary) (1798–1861), English antiquary and amateur poet
- James Clarke (VC) (1894–1947), English World War I soldier and recipient of the Victoria Cross
- James Fernandez Clarke (1812–1876), English surgeon and medical writer
- James Freeman Clarke (1810–1888), American preacher and author
- James Stanier Clarke (1766–1834), English cleric, author and librarian to the Prince of Wales
- James Franklin Clarke Jr., American historian

== See also ==
- James Clarke and Co Ltd, an imprint of The Lutterworth Press
- Clarke
- James Clarke Hook (1819–1907), English painter
- James Clark (disambiguation)
- James Clerk (disambiguation)
- Jamie Clarke (disambiguation)
