= 1913 in association football =

The following are the football (soccer) events of the year 1913 throughout the world.

== Events ==
- Maccabi Haifa is founded.
- Vålerenga Fotball is founded.
- Woolwich Arsenal move from the Manor Ground in Plumstead to the new Arsenal Stadium in Highbury. The same year they are also relegated to the Football League Second Division.
- Easington Colliery A.F.C. is founded.
- Parma is founded on 16 December.
- PSV Eindhoven is founded.
- Valenciennes FC is founded.
- A.S. Bisceglie is founded.

== Winners club national championship ==
- Argentina: Racing Club, Estudiantes LP
- Austria: Rapid Vienna
- Belgium: Union Saint-Gilloise
- Denmark: Kjøbenhavns Boldklub
- England: Sunderland F.C.
- France: Cercle Athlétique de Paris
- Germany: VfB Leipzig
- Hungary: Ferencváros
- Iceland: Fram
- Italy: Pro Vercelli
- Netherlands: Sparta Rotterdam
- Paraguay: Cerro Porteño
- Scotland: For fuller coverage, see 1912-13 in Scottish football.
  - Scottish Division One – Rangers
  - Scottish Division Two – Ayr United
  - Scottish Cup – Falkirk
- Sweden: Örgryte IS
- Uruguay: CA River Plate
- Greece: 1913 to 1921 - no championship titles due to the First World War and the Greco-Turkish War of 1919-1922.

== International tournaments ==
- 1913 British Home Championship (January 18 – April 5, 1913)

England

== Births ==
- June 20 – Arne Nyberg, Swedish international footballer (died 1970)
- July 14 – René Llense, French international footballer (died 2014)
- August 11 – Andy Beattie, Scottish international footballer and manager (died 1983)
- August 13 – Stan Risdon, English professional footballer (died 1979)
- September 25 – Josef Bican, Austrian and Czechoslovak international footballer and manager (died 2001)
- October 4 – Egidio Turchi, Italian professional footballer (died 1954)

=== Full date unknown ===
- Jimmy Clark, Scottish professional footballer
