= James Clerk =

James Clerk may refer to:

- Sir James Clerk, 3rd Baronet (died 1782), of the Clerk Baronets
- Sir James Clerk, 7th Baronet, of the Clerk Baronets

== See also ==
- Sir James Clerke (c. 1584–?), English lawyer and politician
- Clerk (disambiguation)
- James Clark (disambiguation)
- James Clarke (disambiguation)
