= List of Columbus Blue Jackets general managers =

The Columbus Blue Jackets are an American professional ice hockey team based in Columbus, Ohio. They play in the Metropolitan Division of the Eastern Conference in the National Hockey League (NHL). The team joined the NHL in 2000 as an expansion team. The Blue Jackets have played their home games at the Nationwide Arena since their inaugural season. The team has had four general managers since their inception.

== Key ==
Key of terms and definitions
Term	Definition
No.	Number of general managers^{[a]}
Ref(s)	References
–	Does not apply

== General managers ==
General managers of the Columbus Blue Jackets
No.	Name	Tenure	Accomplishments during this term	Ref(s)
1	Doug MacLean	February 11, 1998 – April 19, 2007	No playoff appearances	
–	Jim Clark (interim)	April 19, 2007 – June 15, 2007		
2	Scott Howson	June 15, 2007 – February 12, 2013	1 playoff appearance	
3	Jarmo Kekäläinen	February 13, 2013 – February 15, 2024	5 playoff appearances	
–	John Davidson (interim)	February 15, 2024 – May 28, 2024		
4	Don Waddell	May 28, 2024 – present		

== See also ==
- List of NHL general managers

== Notes ==
- ^{a} A running total of the number of general managers of the franchise. Thus any general manager who has two or more separate terms as general manager is only counted once. Interim general managers do not count towards the total.
