= David Andrews (ice hockey) =

Canadian ice hockey executive and player

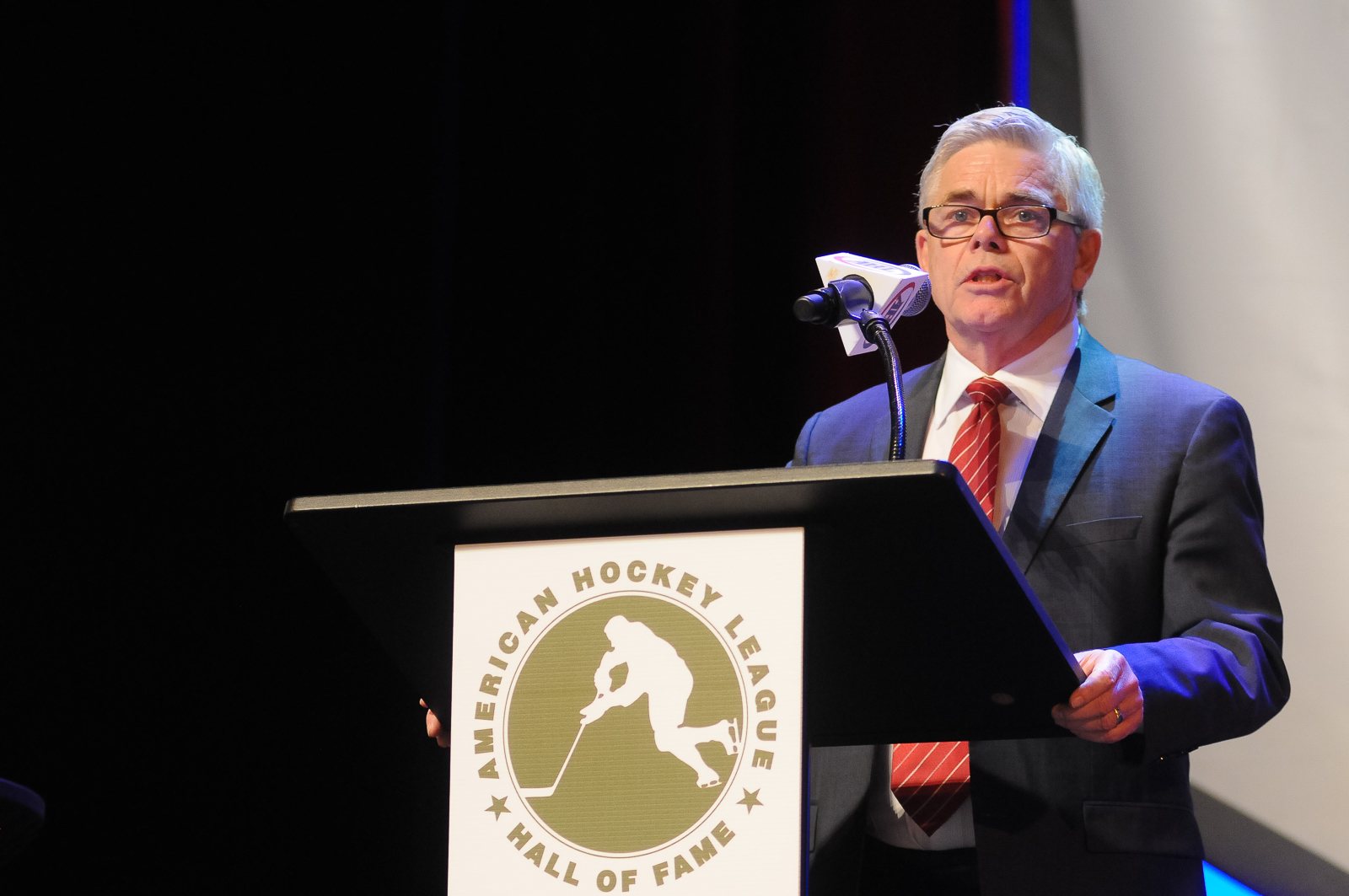
- Andrews in 2015

President of the American Hockey League
- In office July 1, 1994 – June 30, 2020
- Preceded by: Jack Butterfield
- Succeeded by: Scott Howson

Personal details
- Born: October 4, 1948 (age 77) Nova Scotia, Canada
- Children: 3
- Education: University of British Columbia
- Profession: Hockey executive

David Andrews (born October 4, 1948) is a former Canadian ice hockey executive and player. He is the Chair Emeritus of the Board of Governors and former president and CEO of the American Hockey League (AHL), the primary developmental circuit for the National Hockey League. He has been inducted into the British Columbia Hockey Hall of Fame (2005), the Nova Scotia Sport Hall of Fame (2006), and the American Hockey League Hall of Fame (2021). In 2010, Andrews was a recipient of the Lester Patrick Award for contributions to hockey in the United States.

== Early life ==
Born in Nova Scotia, Andrews attended King's-Edgehill School in Windsor, Nova Scotia, then went on to Dalhousie University in Halifax and the University of British Columbia in Vancouver, where he excelled in varsity hockey at these institutions as a goaltender, garnering multiple conference all-star status. After graduation, he played four years of professional hockey in the Netherlands.

== Career ==
Andrews became the hockey development coordinator for the province of British Columbia in 1975 and served in this capacity for five years until joining the Victoria Cougars of the Western Hockey League as a coach. In this time, Andrews coached numerous players who became NHL standouts, including future Hall of Fame goaltender Grant Fuhr, and the Cougars were WHL champions in 1981. He took over as head coach and Director of Hockey Operations for the Cougars in 1982. In addition to his involvement with the Cougars, Andrews was on the Canadian Amateur Hockey Association's Developmental Council for 10 years and was Chairman of its Coaching Committee. He was the first head coach of Canada's National under-18 program in 1982. From 1984 to 1987, he served as a senior consultant with Sport Canada working with five national winter sport organizations in preparing their athletes for the 1988 Winter Olympics in Calgary.

From 1987 to 1994, Andrews was the director of AHL operations for the Edmonton Oilers and guided the Oilers' AHL affiliates, the Nova Scotia Oilers and Cape Breton Oilers. This period was highlighted by Andrews being awarded the James C. Hendy Memorial Award in 1990 as the AHL's outstanding executive, the Cape Breton Oilers setting a record with 36 sellouts in the 1990–91 season, and the Oilers capturing the 1993 Calder Cup as AHL champions.

Andrews assumed the presidency of the AHL in 1994, taking over from longtime president Jack Butterfield. Under Andrews, the league saw record levels of attendance and exposure while expanding its geography across the United States and Canada. During his tenure, the AHL became the sole primary development league for all National Hockey League organizations, serving as a training ground for players, coaches, executives, on-ice officials, broadcasters, and training staff.

In 2001, Andrews led one of the largest expansion efforts in professional sports, bringing nine new cities into the AHL including six from the folding International Hockey League. In 2015, Andrews managed the process of relocating five AHL franchises to California, allowing for the creation of a Pacific Division to better meet the needs of western-based NHL organizations. The Pacific Division has since grown to include teams in Tucson, Arizona; Loveland, Colorado; Henderson, Nevada; Abbotsford, British Columbia; Calgary, Alberta; and Palm Desert, California.

League attendance climbed dramatically, more than doubling from 2.9 million in the final season before his term began in 1994 to more than 7 million annually. The league also grew its television presence airing on national networks such as Sportsnet, CBC, TSN, NHL Network, ESPN2, and CBS Sports Network, as well as on satellite radio and the internet through live video streaming. The All-Star Classic was also re-introduced in 1995 after a 35-year absence, and Andrews coordinated the unique 2014 event that saw the AHL's best host renowned Swedish club team Färjestad BK.

Andrews contributed to the growth of hockey by playing a leadership role in rules innovations — such as hybrid icing and 4-on-4 and later 3-on-3 overtime play — and player safety initiatives. The AHL has instituted safety standards relative to head checking and checking from behind; introduced mandatory visors for all skaters; and provided a safer environment for its players by adopting a modified schedule that reduced the number of games played, increased the length of the playing calendar and eliminated sequences of teams playing four games in five days.

On the business front, Andrews grew corporate and broadcast partnerships to new levels, built strong platforms for the league’s special events such as the All-Star Classic and Calder Cup Finals, and oversaw dramatic increases in league-wide revenues and franchise values.

== Retirement ==
On May 6, 2019, the AHL announced that Andrews would retire on June 30, 2020, following the end of the 2019–20 season; Scott Howson was elected as Andrews' successor on February 14, 2020, with Andrews set to assume the role of Chairman of the Board of Governors on July 1, 2020.

== Accolades ==
Andrews was inducted into the British Columbia Hockey Hall of Fame in 2005, and the Nova Scotia Sport Hall of Fame in 2006.

In 2010, Andrews was a recipient of the prestigious Lester Patrick Trophy for contributions to hockey in the United States. In 2020, following his 26-year tenure as league president, the AHL awarded him the 2020 Thomas Ebright Memorial Award for outstanding career contributions to the league.

Andrews is a former chair of the Hockey Canada Foundation, former chair of the Board of Governors of King's-Edgehill School, and former chair of the selection committee for the Order of Hockey in Canada. He is also a former adjunct professor of sport management at Springfield College.

In 2021, Andrews was elected to the AHL Hall of Fame.
