= James B. Clark =

James B. Clark may refer to:

- Champ Clark (James Beauchamp Clark, 1850–1921), American politician
- James B. Clark (filmmaker) (1908–2000), American film editor and director
- James B. Clark (Canadian politician) (1867–1943), Canadian politician from Ontario
- James B. Clark, Jr. (1957–1996), murderer executed in the U.S. state of Delaware

== See also ==
- James Clark (disambiguation)
