= Jamie Clarke =

Jamie Clarke may refer to:

- James M. Clarke (1917–1999), U.S. House Representatives, North Carolina
- Jamie Clarke (adventurer) (born 1968), Canadian adventurer and author
- Jamie Clarke (footballer, born 1982), English footballer for Guiseley
- Jamie Clarke (footballer, born 1988), English footballer for Lincoln City
- Jamie Clarke (Gaelic footballer), for Armagh
- Jamie Clarke (snooker player) (born 1994), Welsh snooker player
- Jamie Clarke (Neighbours), a character on Australian soap opera Neighbours

== See also ==
- Jaime Clarke (born 1971), American novelist and editor
- James Clarke (disambiguation)
- Jamie Clark (footballer) (born 1976), Scottish football player and coach
- Jamie Clark (rugby league) (born 1987), Australian-Lebanese rugby league player
