= Jim Clark (ice hockey) =

Canadian ice hockey coach, scout (born 1954)

- Born: 1954; Summerside, PEI, Canada
- Occupation: Hockey executive
- Known for: Interim GM of the Columbus Blue Jackets (April–June 2007)

Jim Clark (born 1954) is currently a professional scout for the Colorado Avalanche as of the 2024 season and previously the director of professional scouting for the Ottawa Senators since 2014. Prior to his appointment, Clark scouted for the Detroit Red Wings from 1990 to 1993 and the Florida Panthers from 1996 to 1998. Apart from scouting, Clark was the interim general manager for the Columbus Blue Jackets from April 2007 to June 2007 and the assistant general manager since 2000. Outside of the National Hockey League, Clark held coaching positions with the Summerside Western Capitals during the 1980s. With the Island Junior Hockey League team, Clark primarily worked as a general manager while also working as an assistant coach and head coach for Summerside.

== Early life ==
In 1954, Clark was born in Summerside, Prince Edward Island.

== Career ==
Clark began his ice hockey career in the Island Junior Hockey League with the Summerside Western Capitals. Originally an assistant coach for the Capitals from 1981 to 1983, Clark was promoted to general manager in 1983 and head coach in 1984. He remained with the Capitals as their general manager from 1985 to 1989. Clark moved to the National Hockey League in 1990 to become a scout with the Detroit Red Wings. While with the Red Wings, he was named director of hockey operations for Detroit's American Hockey League team Adirondack Red Wings in 1993. Clark left the Red Wings for the Florida Panthers in 1996. With the Panthers, he continued his scouting career until 1998.

In 1998, Clark started a ten-year tenure with the Columbus Blue Jackets as vice-president and assistant general manager. During his time with the Blue Jackets, Clark was named interim general manager in April 2007. Clark was replaced by Scott Howson in June 2007 and remained with Columbus for the rest of the 2007 season. After leaving the Blue Jackets in 2008, Clark began working with the Ottawa Senators as a scout. He was promoted to director of professional scouting for the Senators in 2014.
