= Doug MacLean =

Canadian ice hockey executive and sportscaster

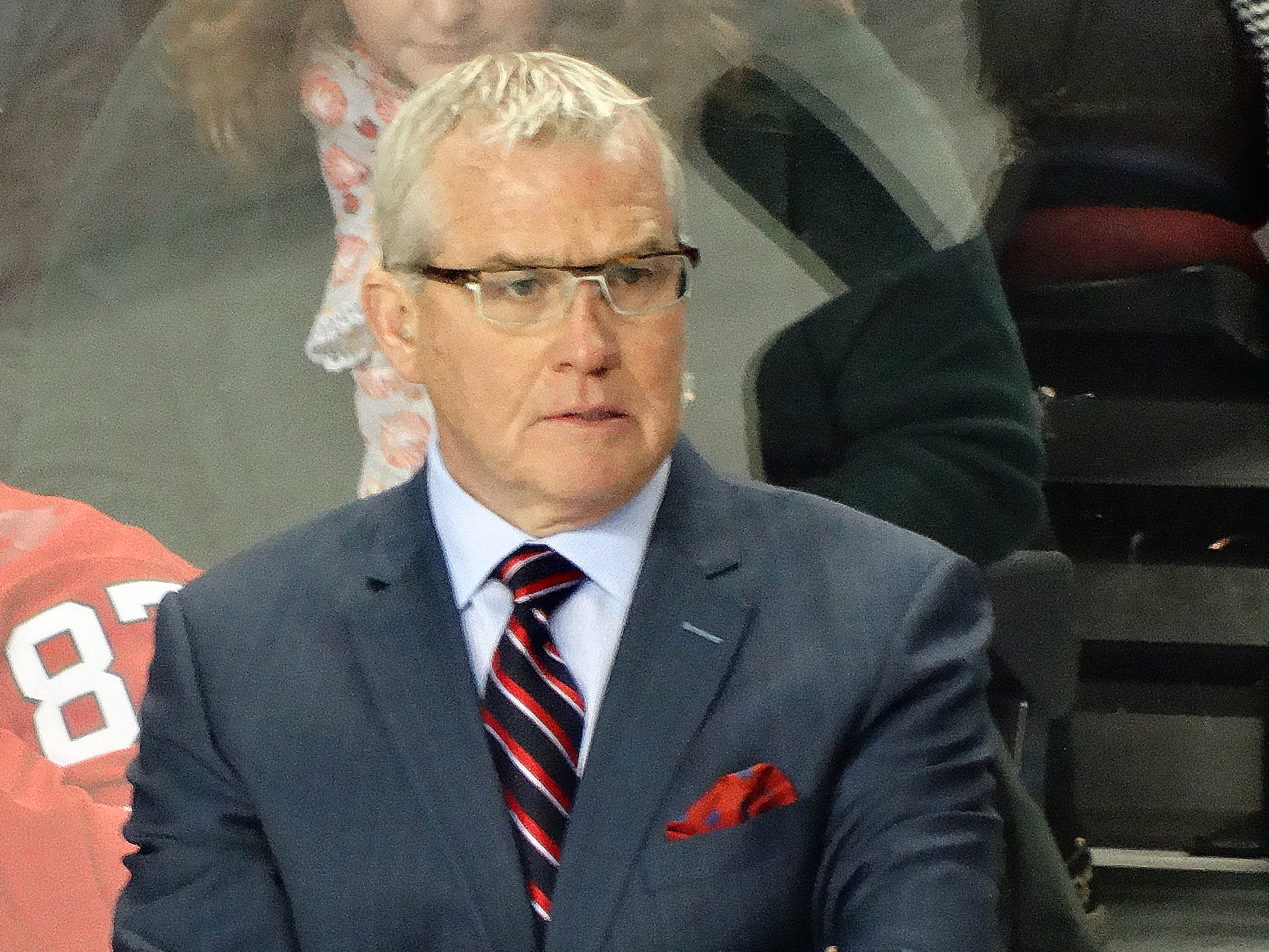
- MacLean in 2014
- Born: April 12, 1954 (age 72) Summerside, Prince Edward Island, Canada
- Coached for: Florida Panthers; Columbus Blue Jackets
- Coaching career: 1995–2004

James Douglas MacLean (born April 12, 1954) is a Canadian sportscaster and former ice hockey coach and general manager. He is the former president/general manager and head coach of the National Hockey League's Columbus Blue Jackets and was also the head coach of the Florida Panthers. He is affectionately known as "Prince Eddy" due to his affinity for Prince Edward Island.

== Career ==
MacLean began coaching at the University of New Brunswick, followed by assistant coach positions with the St. Louis Blues and Washington Capitals. MacLean's first professional head coach position came in 1990, when he was sent to the Baltimore Skipjacks, the Capitals' AHL affiliate, as part of a midseason shakeup that placed Skipjacks head coach Terry Murray at the Capitals' helm. Before coaching, he had played varsity hockey for the University of Prince Edward Island Panthers.

MacLean served in the Detroit Red Wings organization from 1990 to 1994. During this time, he served as an assistant coach under Bryan Murray in 1990–91 and 1991–92. For the 1992–93 and 1993–94 seasons, MacLean served as the General Manager for the Adirondack Red Wings of the American Hockey League, the Red Wings top affiliate. During his time as general manager, he orchestrated the trade of Kris Draper from the Winnipeg Jets to the Red Wings for "future considerations", which turned out to be US$1.

MacLean is probably best known for leading an up-start Panthers team to the Eastern Conference championship in 1996, only to be beaten in the Stanley Cup Finals by the Colorado Avalanche.

After leading the Panthers to the playoffs in both the 1995–96 and 1996–97 seasons, MacLean was fired 23 games into the 1997–98 campaign when the Panthers started with a 7–12–4 record.

MacLean was hired to serve as the Blue Jackets' general manager on February 11, 1998, and added the position of team president to his responsibilities a month later. The Blue Jackets began play for the 2000–01 NHL season. On January 7, 2003 MacLean fired Blue Jackets head coach Dave King and named himself head coach, a position he held until January 1, 2004, when he promoted assistant coach Gerard Gallant to the role. MacLean remained president and general manager until he was fired at the conclusion of the 2006–07 season. The Blue Jackets never posted a winning record, going 172–258–62 under MacLean's leadership. He was the only general manager in NHL history to serve for six seasons without making the playoffs, a streak that lasted until 2025-2026, when Steve Yzerman completed his seventh consecutive season without a playoff appearance as general manager of the Detroit Red Wings.

On August 7, 2007, MacLean, who led a group of nine investors, announced that the owner of the Tampa Bay Lightning, Palace Sports and Entertainment, agreed to sell the team to MacLean's group for $200 million. The sale collapsed in November 2007 when the ownership group was unable to make a $5 million payment due. MacLean and his partners later sued former associate Oren Koules, whom they accused of defaulting on his share, but also attempting to make his own deal with the Lightning.

On August 18, 2008, MacLean became a co-host alongside Jack Armstrong on a sports talk radio show on Toronto Sports Radio Station, The Fan590, "The Game Plan".

On September 18, 2009, MacLean took over the Hockey Central Radio program from 1–2 pm and was hired by Jim Balsillie as an advisor to the PSE group which attempted to acquire and relocate the Phoenix Coyotes to Canada.

On September 13, 2010, MacLean became a co-host of the Fan 590's Hockey Central at Noon program alongside Daren Millard and Nick Kypreos as well as an analyst on Rogers Sportsnet's Hockey Central.

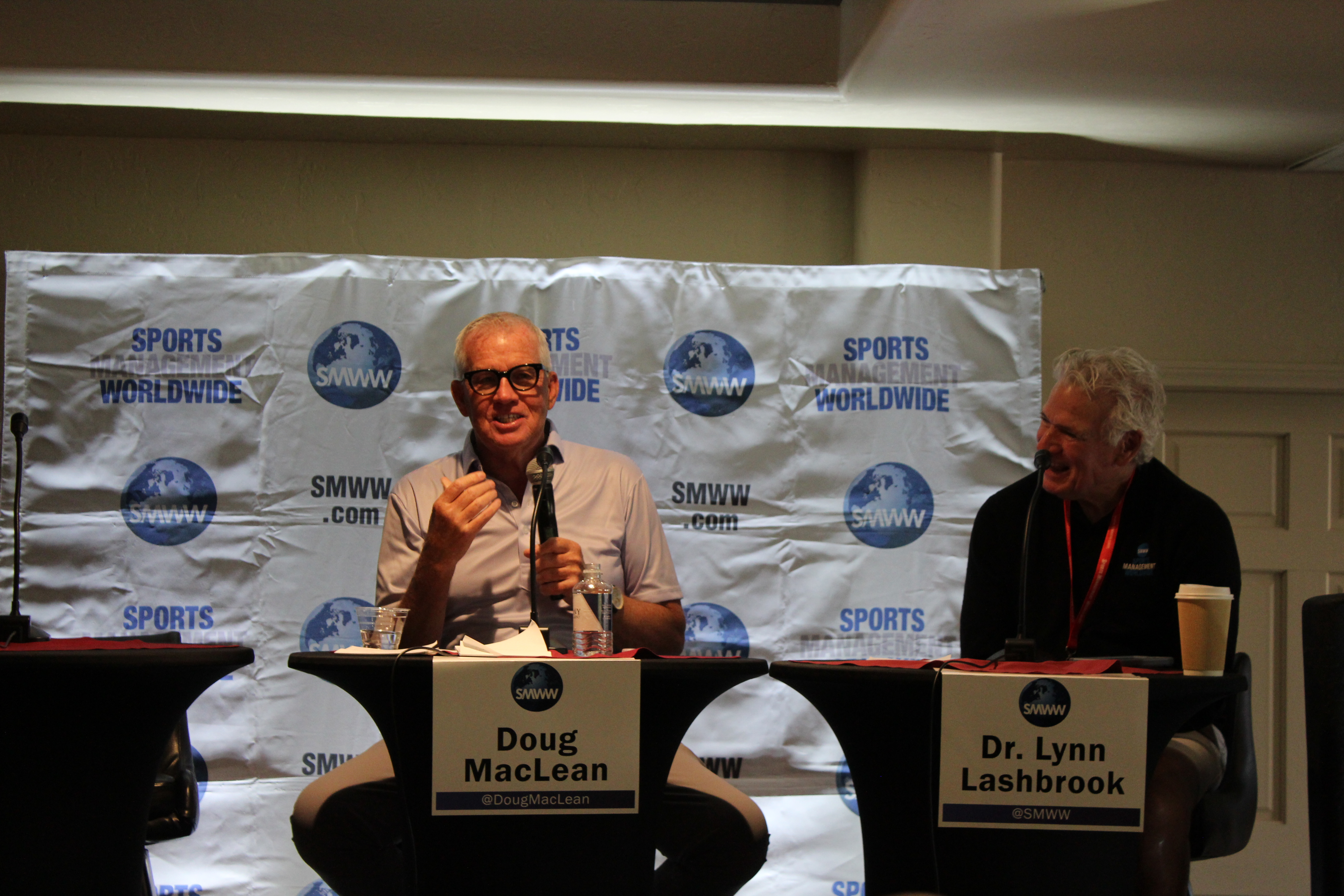
Doug MacLean and Dr. Lynn Lashbrook at the 2024 SMWW Hockey Career Conference

On August 29, 2019, MacLean released a statement on Twitter that he was parting ways with Sportsnet. Until this announcement, MacLean was a regular panelist on Sportnet's Hockey Central television show and was a major contributor to Sportsnet's radio programming.

Doug is currently a "Hockey GM and Scouting" instructor for the online sports-career training school Sports Management Worldwide, founded and run by Dr. Lynn Lashbrook and speaks annually at the "SMWW Hockey Career Conference".

In October 2024, MacLean teamed with sportswriter Scott Morrison (journalist) on the bestselling Draft Day: How Hockey Teams Pick Winners or Get Left Behind. He followed that up in October 2026, Game Day: The Uncensored Life of an NHL GM, written with Greg Oliver, which was also a Canadian bestseller.

== Coaching record ==
| Team | Year | Regular season | | | | | | | Postseason |
| Team | Year | G | W | L | T | OTL | Pts | Division rank | Result |
|---|---|---|---|---|---|---|---|---|---|
| FLA | 1995–96 | 82 | 41 | 31 | 10 | — | 92 | 3rd in Atlantic | Lost in Stanley Cup Finals |
| FLA | 1996–97 | 82 | 35 | 28 | 19 | — | 89 | 3rd in Atlantic | Lost in Conference Quarterfinals |
| FLA | 1997–98 | 23 | 7 | 12 | 4 | — | (18) | (fired) | — |
| CBJ | 2002–03 | 42 | 15 | 22 | 4 | 1 | (35) | 5th in Central | Missed playoffs |
| CBJ | 2003–04 | 37 | 9 | 21 | 4 | 3 | (25) | (resigned) | |
| Total | | 266 | 107 | 114 | 41 | 4 | 259 | — | 2 playoff appearances |

Sporting positions
| Preceded by Roger Neilson | Head coach of the Florida Panthers; 1995–1997 | Succeeded by Bryan Murray |
| Preceded by Dave King | Head coach of the Columbus Blue Jackets; 2002–2003 | Succeeded by Gerard Gallant |
| Preceded by Position created | General manager of the Columbus Blue Jackets; 1998 – 2007 | Succeeded by Scott Howson |
