= Jarmo Kekäläinen =

Ice hockey player and manager

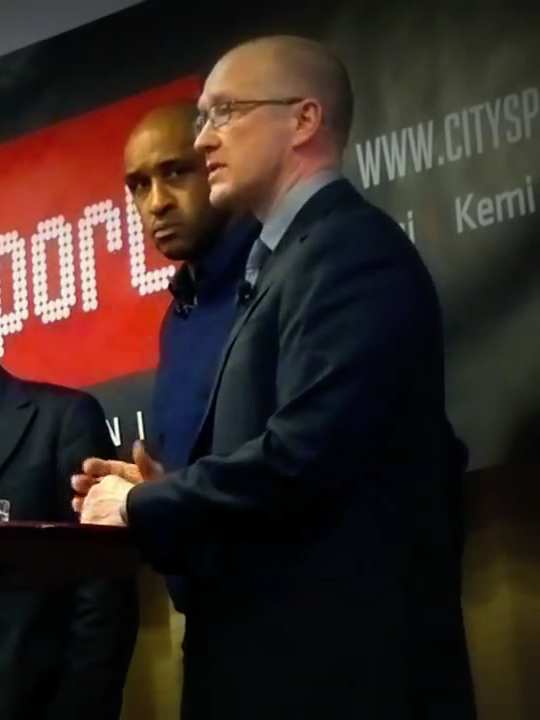
- Kekäläinen (right) in 2012
- Born: July 3, 1966 (age 59) Tampere, Finland
- Height: 6 ft 0 in (183 cm)
- Weight: 190 lb (86 kg; 13 st 8 lb)
- Position: Left wing
- Shot: Right
- Played for: Ilves; Boston Bruins; KalPa; Tappara; Ottawa Senators; Västerås IK
- National team: Finland
- NHL draft: Undrafted
- Playing career: 1985–1995

Jarmo Kekäläinen (born July 3, 1966) is a Finnish professional ice hockey executive and former player who is the general manager for the Buffalo Sabres of the National Hockey League (NHL). He briefly played in the NHL with the Boston Bruins and Ottawa Senators, as well as in Europe with Ilves, KalPa, Tappara, and Västerås IK. Following his retirement, Kekäläinen has served as an executive, most notably as general manager of the Columbus Blue Jackets from 2013 to 2024.

== Playing career ==
Kekäläinen began his ice hockey career in his native Finland, playing for four years in Finland with a number of teams as well as for Finland junior team in the 1986 World Junior Championships. He then played for Clarkson University for two seasons, establishing himself and gaining interest from professional teams. In his second year with the Golden Knights, he scored 44 points in 31 games and was named to the ECAC First Team. After concluding his collegiate career, Kekäläinen signed with the Boston Bruins of National Hockey League (NHL). He played parts of two seasons with the Bruins before returning to Finland, where he played for another two years. For the 1993–94 season, Kekäläinen went back to North America, where he signed with the Ottawa Senators. He played briefly with the Senators that season, playing in 28 games. The following season, Kekäläinen played in Sweden before retiring in 1995, because of knee problems which were caused by injuries.

== Executive career ==
After retirement from playing, Kekäläinen became involved with front office work in many capacities. He was general manager of HIFK Hockey in the SM-liiga from 1995 to 1999, during which time HIFK won one Kanada-malja trophy and finished as runner-up to TPS the following year. During this time with HIFK, Kekäläinen also worked in several capacities with the Ottawa Senators. After he left Finland in 1999, Kekäläinen became director of player personnel for the Senators until 2002. While with the Senators he helped in selecting future NHL stars Marián Hossa, Martin Havlát and Ray Emery. In 2002, Kekäläinen joined the St. Louis Blues as assistant general manager and director of amateur scouting, where he helped draft much of the core of the team in the early 2010s, including defenceman Alex Pietrangelo and forwards T. J. Oshie, Patrik Berglund, David Perron, and David Backes. After being passed over for the Blues' general manager job for Doug Armstrong, Kekäläinen returned to Finland to take the general manager job with Jokerit.

=== Columbus Blue Jackets ===
While with Jokerit, Kekäläinen had an unwritten escape clause with ownership that permitted him to leave if he was offered a general manager job in the NHL. That opportunity came on February 13, 2013, when after Scott Howson was fired the previous day, the Columbus Blue Jackets' president of hockey operations John Davidson, under whom Kekäläinen had worked while with the Blues, hired Kekäläinen to be the new general manager of the Blue Jackets. Kekäläinen became the first European and first Finnish general manager in the NHL.

On April 28, 2021, Kekäläinen was named assistant general manager of Finland senior team for the 2022 Winter Olympics.

On February 15, 2024, Kekäläinen was fired by the Blue Jackets after a 16–26–10 start to the season, as the Blue Jackets looked for a "fresh perspective as [they] move forward". This ended his 11-year tenure, the longest in franchise history, which included the team's first playoff series win in 2019. He was replaced by Davidson on the interim basis.

=== Buffalo Sabres ===
On May 30, 2025, Kekäläinen was hired by the Buffalo Sabres as a senior advisor. On December 15, he was named general manager of the Sabres, replacing Kevyn Adams, who was fired. On December 20, Kekäläinen fired associate general manager Jason Karmanos, who was replaced by former Montreal Canadiens general manager Marc Bergevin on December 21.

== Personal life ==
Kekäläinen has a bachelor's degree in management from Clarkson University, and graduated with a M.Sc. (Econ.) in marketing from the University of Tampere in 2000. He was selected as the alumnus of the year in 2018. Kekäläinen and his wife have two daughters.

== Career statistics ==
=== Regular season and playoffs ===
			Regular season					Playoffs
Season	Team	League	GP	G	A	Pts	PIM	GP	G	A	Pts	PIM
1983–84	KalPa	FIN.2	23	0	1	1	2	—	—	—	—	—
1984–85	KalPa	FIN.2	35	10	7	17	6	—	—	—	—	—
1985–86	Ilves	FIN U20	9	12	6	18	4	3	0	1	1	0
1985–86	Ilves	SM-l	29	6	6	12	8	—	—	—	—	—
1986–87	Ilves	FIN U20	12	12	10	22	16	4	0	3	3	6
1986–87	Ilves	SM-l	42	3	4	7	4	—	—	—	—	—
1987–88	Clarkson University	ECAC	32	7	11	18	38	—	—	—	—	—
1988–89	Clarkson University	ECAC	31	19	25	44	47	—	—	—	—	—
1989–90	Boston Bruins	NHL	11	2	2	4	8	—	—	—	—	—
1989–90	Maine Mariners	AHL	18	5	11	16	6	—	—	—	—	—
1990–91	Boston Bruins	NHL	16	2	1	3	6	—	—	—	—	—
1990–91	Maine Mariners	AHL	11	2	4	6	4	1	0	1	1	0
1991–92	KalPa	SM-l	24	2	8	10	24	—	—	—	—	—
1992–93	Tappara	SM-l	47	15	12	27	34	—	—	—	—	—
1993–94	Ottawa Senators	NHL	28	1	5	6	14	—	—	—	—	—
1993–94	Prince Edward Island Senators	AHL	18	6	6	12	18	—	—	—	—	—
1993–94	SC Rapperswil–Jona	SUI.2	—	—	—	—	—	1	0	0	0	0
1994–95	Västerås IK	SEL	32	2	6	8	32	1	0	0	0	0
SM-l totals			142	26	30	56	70	—	—	—	—	—
NHL totals			55	5	8	13	28	—	—	—	—	—

=== International ===
Year	Team	Event	GP	G	A	Pts	PIM
1986	Finland	WJC	7	4	3	7	2
1991	Finland	CC	6	0	1	1	0
Senior totals			6	0	1	1	0

== Awards and honours ==
Award	Year	Ref
All-ECAC Hockey First Team	1988–89	

Sporting positions
Preceded by Scott Howson	General manager of the Columbus Blue Jackets; 2013–2024	Succeeded by John Davidson (interim)
Preceded by Kevyn Adams	General manager of the Buffalo Sabres; 2025–present	Incumbent
