= James Clarke (antiquary) =

English antiquarian and amateur poet (1798–1861)

James Clarke (bapt. 27 May 1798 – 23 September 1861) was an English antiquary, archaeologist, shopkeeper, and amateur poet. He published numerous minor articles on the antiquities of his home county, Suffolk, and a volume of doggerel verse.

== Biography ==
James Clarke was born to William Clarke and his wife, Mary Cook, in Bedingfield, Suffolk. He was baptised on 27 May 1798. His first occupation was as a grocer and draper in Suffolk, his shop established opposite the gates of Easton Park, the residence of the dukes of Hamilton, and near Wickham Market. On 12 April 1821, he married Jane Louisa Clamp, née Clonmel. Together, they had four children - three sons and a daughter - between 1826 and 1844.

Clarke was a keen antiquary, particularly for those antiquities of his local area. In 1847, he became an associate of the British Archaeological Association (BAA), which, the BAA stated in their obituary of Clarke, "proved a great source of improvement and enjoyment" for him. Clarke made many communications to the association's journal, predominately concerning his own finds, which the BAA referred to as "numerous, if [...] not of any great importance". The BAA lists 29 communications between 1849 and 1861, among them are reports of: a 12/13th-century brass plate, coins from English kings ranging from Edward III to Elizabeth I (including Roman coins and those of Alexander III of Scotland), a Roman burial vault at Rosas Pit, various seals and rings, architectural remains, and - in his last communication - a denarius of Otto IV, Holy Roman Emperor. Clarke's closest partner in his antiquarian studies was Edward Dunthorne (1792–1853), a fellow grocer in nearby Dennington and antiquary.

Clarke was also an amateur poet, publishing an antiquarian-inspired collection of 115 four-line stanzas, in his The Suffolk antiquary; containing a brief sketch of the sites of ancient castles, abbeys, priories … also notices of ancient coins and other antiquities found in the county … concluding with a petition for calling in all defaced coins, and other changes to quiet the public mind (1849). This collection of self-declared "doggerel rhyme" includes tangential fragments of antiquarian and topographical information on Suffolk, and tributes to fellow antiquaries of the county, including David Elisha Davy and W. S. Fitch.

Clarke's health "had been failing for some time", according to the BAA, before he died on 23 September 1862 at Easton, at the age of 63, having published his last communication to the BAA a year earlier. His wife survived him and he was buried at Church of All Saints, Easton, where his gravestone was engraved with a final stanza of his "doggerel rhyme". His will was probated at £1500.
