= James Clark (horticulturist) =

English market gardener and horticulturist

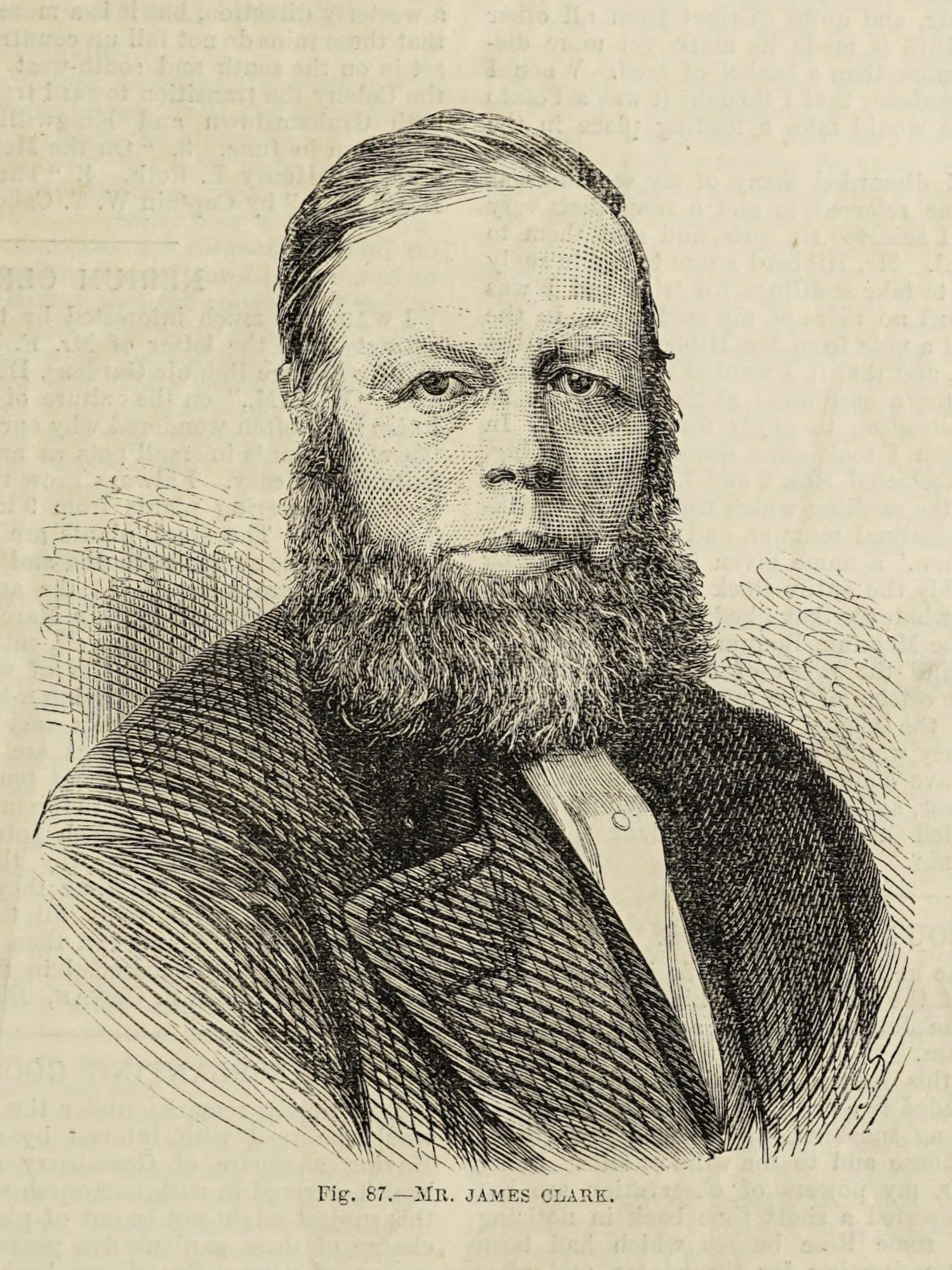
James Clark depicted in The Journal of Horticulture and Cottage Gardener, 1880

James Clark (1 May 1825 – 5 June 1890), was an English market gardener and horticulturist in Christchurch, Dorset who specialised in raising new varieties of potato. His most noted success was Magnum Bonum, described by The Times as "the first real disease-resisting potato ever originated and offered to the world".

== Early life ==
James Clark was born in Tuckton near Christchurch, Hampshire (now Dorset) on 1 May 1825. His father Thomas was a farm labourer. Clark had only a poor education and at the age of nine was sent to work on a farm in the neighbouring hamlet of Iford. When he was aged twelve his family moved closer to Christchurch and his father became an under-gardener at nearby Sandhills, the seaside estate of Sir George Henry Rose, the Member of Parliament for Christchurch. Clark also became a gardener, working for the town's wealthier residents.

It was during this period that a fungus unwittingly transported to Europe from America devastated the potato crop in Ireland, causing the Great Famine of 1845–1850. In the wake of this tragedy potato breeders sought to find a reliable alternative to the disgraced Lumpers and Cups that had been the mainstay of the Irish planting.

== Career ==
In 1855 Clark became the gardener at a local boarding school. It was there that he first developed an interest in growing potatoes and became fascinated by the varieties produced by a single root. However, the onset of a life-long heart complaint compelled him to quit this job and take on less arduous gardening work.

In 1869 Clark moved his family to Cranemoor, a hamlet a few miles east of Christchurch, where his wife became the caretaker at the small Congregational chapel. In return they were granted a cottage and three-quarters of an acre of land rent-free. Despite his continuing poor health, Clark began growing Early Rose potatoes. After lifting the first crop he discovered a few seed balls and from these, he raised forty-two roots of the seedling. He observed that these were all different from the parent plant. The male pollen-parent was uncertain, but Clark suspected that it was Paterson's Victoria because a quantity of that variety had been growing in nearby allotments.

In the following two seasons Clark saw that one of his new seedlings had survived when other local potato plants had been devastated by blight. He realised that this new variety held great promise, so he nurtured them and in the spring of 1874 he sent some of his seedlings to the noted horticulturist Shirley Hibberd for him to test at his trial-ground in Hornsey. Hibberd's tests confirmed the robust good qualities of the new variety and he recommended it to seed merchants Messrs Sutton & Son of Reading, who purchased Clark's entire stock and released it to the public as Sutton's Magnum Bonum in 1876. Hibberd promoted the Magnum Bonum by stating 'I believe that it will prove the most generally useful variety ever put into commerce'.

Magnum Bonum indeed proved to be a commercial success and soon became the best-selling variety grown in Great Britain. Its ability to survive hard frosts recommended it to Scottish growers in particular. It was a white, kidney-shaped late maincrop with a floury texture and a blandly sweet flavour that grew vigorously, withstood disease, and gave good yields. In 1880, reporting on the 7th annual Potato Show held at the Crystal Palace, The Times said: "To ascertain and announce which is the most serviceable potato would be a great national service. There is a very considerable consensus of opinion that in a great number of soils Messrs. Sutton's 'Magnum Bonum' has survived in bad years, and yielded abundantly in good. It is a recent introduction, and the breeder who first raised it in 1871, Mr. Clark, of Christchurch, was present yesterday at the show. It has been supplied to the Marquis of Lansdowne and other landed proprietors in Ireland, and to one of the Dublin relief funds, and is stated to have answered admirably in the humid soil of Ireland."

The popularity of Magnum Bonum peaked in about 1890, after which it degenerated and became susceptible to blight. Nevertheless, it was used to breed numerous other disease-resistant varieties.

Clark subsequently produced a number of other varieties released by Sutton & Son. These included Maincrop/Langworthy (1876), Reading Hero (1881), Sutton's Seedling (1886), Abundance (1886), Best of All (1887), Satisfaction (1887), Masterpiece (1887), White Kidney (1888), Early Market (1888), Matchless (1889), Nonesuch (1889), Perfection (1892), Triumph (1892), Supreme (1893), Epicure (1897), No Plus Ultra (1897), Reliance (1897), Ninetyfold (1897), Ideal (1898), Inevitable (1898), Centenary (1900), and Favourite (1902). Of these, Ninetyfold was a successful variety that was grown commercially until the 1960s and Epicure proved an outstanding variety that is still grown today. The Epicure is famous for recovering quickly from frost damage and having surprisingly high yields. It became the traditional Ayrshire early potato and although there has been a recent tendency to replace it, it remains a popular garden variety in Scotland. It is round, deep eyed, floury, and tasty.

James Clark died at his Christchurch home on 5 June 1890 aged 65 years.
