= Egidio Turchi =

Italian footballer and coach (1913-1954)

Personal information
- Date of birth: 4 October 1913
- Place of birth: Pistoia, Kingdom of Italy
- Date of death: 2 December 1954
- Height: 1.82 m (5 ft 11 1/2 in)
- Position: Midfielder

Senior career*
Years	Team	Apps	(Gls)
1927–1932	Pistoiese	63	(1)
1932–1933	Ambrosiana-Inter	13	(1)
1933–1934	Livorno	15	(3)
1934–1935	Pistoiese	25	(5)
1935–1936	Lazio	14	(0)
1936–1937	Ambrosiana-Inter	8	(1)
1937–1939	Lucchese	56	(2)
1939–1940	Napoli	10	(0)
1940–1941	Lucchese	14	(1)
1941–1942	Prato	27	(1)
1942–1943	Palermo	21	(0)
1945–1948	Pistoiese	53	(1)
- * Club domestic league appearances and goals

Egidio Turchi (4 October 1913 – 2 December 1954) was an Italian professional football player and later in his career became a coach.

== Career ==
Turchi's debut as a professional was for Pistoiese. He played as a midfielder, and remained in Italy for his entire career, representing famous clubs such as Lazio and Napoli.

Turchi coached Pistoiese and Bondenese from 1948 until 1951, managing Colleferro, Bondeno, and ending his career in his hometown and original club, Pistoiese.
