= James Clarke (cricketer) =

English cricketer

Personal information
- Full name: James Clarke
- Born: 7 May 1979 (age 47); Lincoln, Lincolnshire
- Batting: Right-handed
- Bowling: Right-arm medium

Domestic team information
- Years: Team
- 1997–2004: Lincolnshire

Career statistics
Competition	List A
Matches	8
Runs scored	173
Batting average	21.62
100s/50s	0/1
Top score	53
Catches/stumpings	1/–
- Source: Cricinfo, 23 June 2011

James Clarke (born 7 May 1979) is a former English cricketer. Clarke was a right-handed batsman who bowled right-arm medium pace. He was born in Lincoln, Lincolnshire.

Clarke made his debut for Lincolnshire in the 1997 Minor Counties Championship against Cambridgeshire. Clarke played Minor counties cricket for Lincolnshire from 1997 to 2004, which included 43 Minor Counties Championship matches and 18 MCCA Knockout Trophy matches. He made his List A debut against Wales Minor Counties in the 1999 NatWest Trophy. He played 7 further List A matches for Lincolnshire, the last coming against Nottinghamshire in the 2003 Cheltenham & Gloucester Trophy. In his 8 matches, he scored 173 runs at an average of 21.62. He scored his only half century when he made 53 against Nottinghamshire in the 2003 Cheltenham & Gloucester Trophy.
