= James Clark (Australian cricketer) =

Australian cricketer

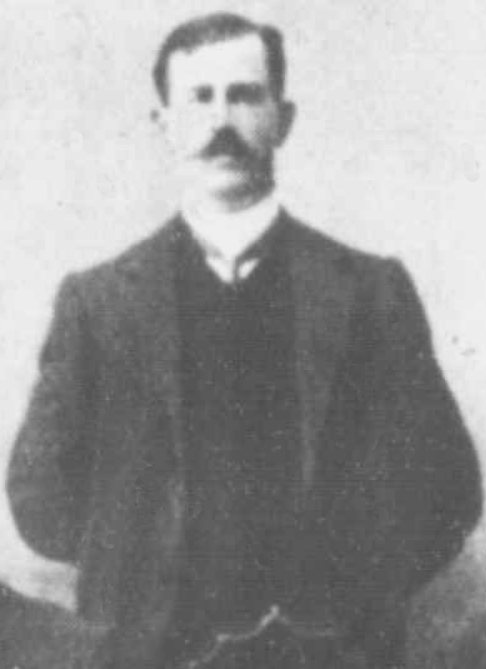

Personal information
- Full name: James Patrick Clark
- Born: 14 March 1871; Queensland, Australia
- Died: 6 June 1941 (aged 70); Coolangatta, Australia
- Source: ESPNcricinfo, 7 May 2016

James Clark (14 March 1871 – 6 June 1941) was an Australian cricketer. He played two first-class matches for Queensland between 1898 and 1900.
