= Scott Howson =

Canadian ice hockey player

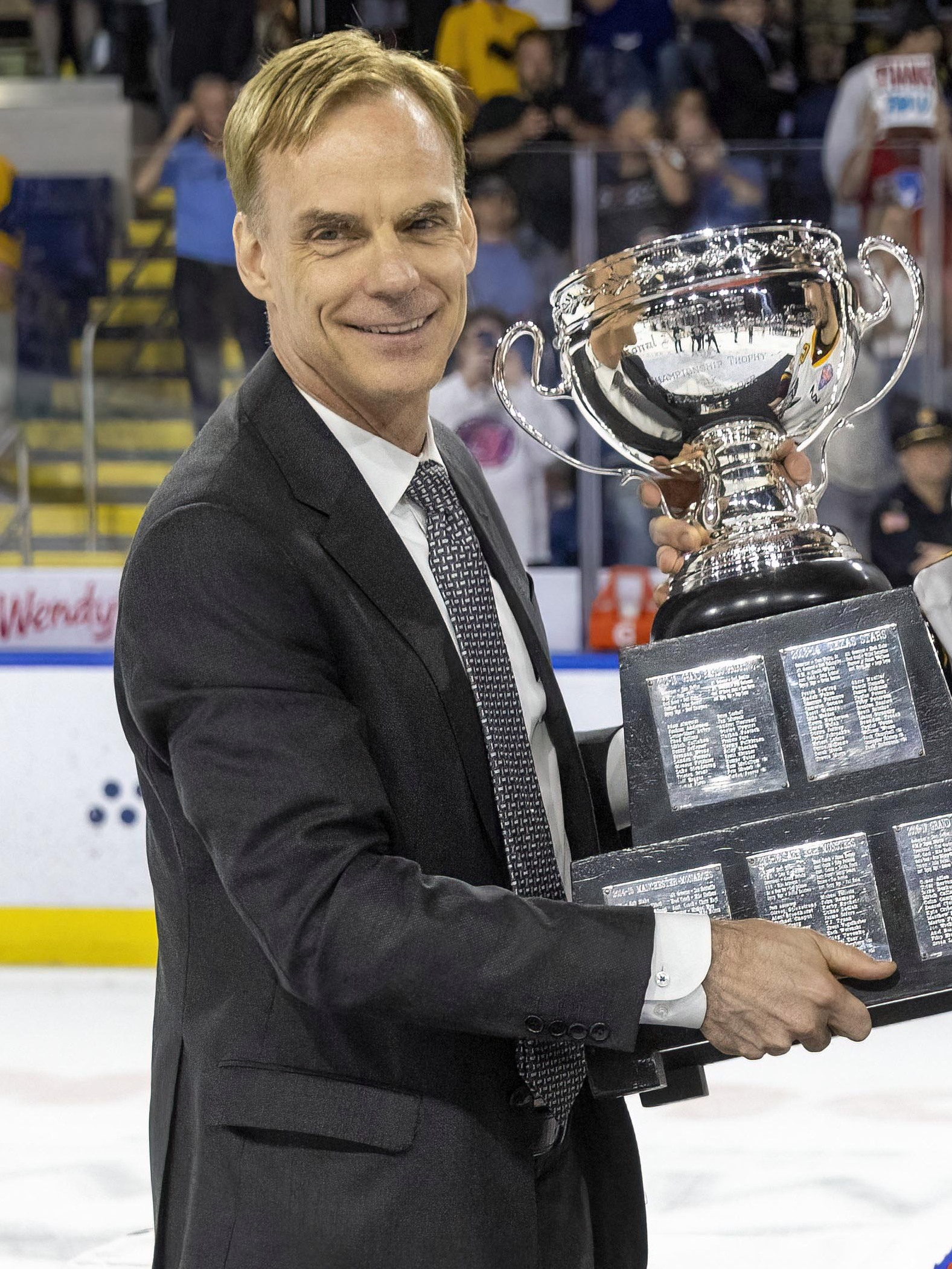
- Howson in 2022
- Born: April 9, 1960 (age 66) Toronto, Ontario, Canada
- Height: 5 ft 11 in (180 cm)
- Weight: 160 lb (73 kg; 11 st 6 lb)
- Position: Centre
- Shot: Right
- Played for: New York Islanders
- NHL draft: Undrafted
- Playing career: 1981–1986

AHL President and Chief Executive Officer
- Incumbent
- Assumed office July 1, 2020
- Preceded by: David Andrews

Donald Scott Howson (born April 9, 1960) is a Canadian ice hockey executive and former player. He was formerly the general manager of the Columbus Blue Jackets of the National Hockey League (NHL). He played 18 games in the NHL with the New York Islanders between the 1984–85 and 1985–86 seasons. The rest of his playing career, which lasted from 1981 to 1986, was spent in the minor leagues. He later turned to coaching and managing, working for several years in the American Hockey League (AHL) before moving to the NHL.

In July 2020, he took over as president and chief executive officer of the AHL.

== Playing career ==
As a youth, Howson played in the 1973 Quebec International Pee-Wee Hockey Tournament with a minor ice hockey team from Thornhill, Ontario.

Howson played two seasons with the Kingston Canadians of the Ontario Hockey Association, and one more season with the club after they moved to the Ontario Hockey League. In that season, Howson amassed 57 goals, and 140 points in 66 games. That was second in team scoring to Bernie Nicholls, and sixth in league scoring.

Howson would then go on to play one season (1981–82) with the Toledo Goaldiggers of the IHL. He won the Garry F. Longman Memorial Trophy as IHL rookie of the year after scoring 55 goals and 120 points in only 74 games.

Howson played 146 games over three seasons with the Indianapolis Checkers of the Central Hockey League. It was after his time with the Checkers that Howson split two seasons between the New York Islanders, and their American Hockey League affiliate, the Springfield Indians. He played eight games in the 1984–85 season, and another 10 in the 1985–86 season. In the total 18 games, he had 5 goals, 3 assists, and 8 points. In his first game with the Islanders against the Detroit Red Wings on January 22 1985, Howson had two shots on goal and scored on both of them.

== Post-playing career ==
Howson holds a bachelor's degree from York University and is a graduate of York's Osgoode Hall Law School. After retiring from playing, he practiced law before joining the Edmonton Oilers organization in 1994 as general manager of their AHL affiliates, the Cape Breton Oilers and later the Hamilton Bulldogs. When Glen Sather left the Oilers for the New York Rangers and the Oilers hired Kevin Lowe, Lowe immediately promoted Howson to the Oilers where he served as assistant general manager from 2002 to 2007. Howson's AHL clubs reached the Calder Cup Finals in 1997 and 2003, and he served on the AHL's board of governors.

On June 15, 2007, Howson was named general manager of the Columbus Blue Jackets, and he guided the franchise to its first Stanley Cup Playoff appearance in 2009. He was relieved of his duties on February 12, 2013.

On March 12, 2013, Howson was hired by the Edmonton Oilers as a professional scout. On April 15, 2013, the Oilers named him the senior vice president of hockey operations. When Peter Chiarelli was hired as the Oilers' general manager in 2015, Howson's role was changed to vice president of player personnel.

== AHL Presidency ==
On February 14, 2020, Howson was elected president and chief executive officer of the American Hockey League, the 10th person to hold that office. He officially succeeded Dave Andrews on July 1, 2020.

Howson guided the AHL through the COVID-19 pandemic, which included a shortened 2020-21 season that was modified due to health and safety protocols. He later oversaw the addition of the Coachella Valley Firebirds, the league's 32nd franchise; expanded the Calder Cup Playoff field to 23 teams; and implemented a unified 72-game schedule in the regular season. Howson has also actively advocated for diversity and inclusion, most notably with the addition in 2021 of 10 women to the AHL’s roster of referees and linespeople for the first time.

== Career statistics ==
=== Regular season and playoffs ===
			Regular season					Playoffs
Season	Team	League	GP	G	A	Pts	PIM	GP	G	A	Pts	PIM
1977–78	North York Rangers	OPJAHL	55	27	31	58	30	—	—	—	—	—
1978–79	Kingston Canadians	OMJHL	58	27	47	74	45	11	0	10	10	12
1979–80	Kingston Canadians	OMJHL	68	38	50	88	52	3	0	4	4	0
1980–81	Kingston Canadians	OHL	66	57	83	140	53	14	9	10	19	2
1981–82	Indianapolis Checkers	CHL	8	2	1	3	5	—	—	—	—	—
1981–82	Toledo Goaldiggers	IHL	71	55	65	120	14	12	10	9	19	6
1982–83	Indianapolis Checkers	CHL	67	34	40	74	22	13	12	9	21	21
1983–84	Indianapolis Checkers	CHL	71	34	34	68	40	7	1	3	4	2
1984–85	New York Islanders	NHL	8	4	1	5	2	—	—	—	—	—
1984–85	Springfield Indians	AHL	57	20	40	60	31	4	1	3	4	2
1985–86	New York Islanders	NHL	10	1	2	3	2	—	—	—	—	—
1985–86	Springfield Indians	AHL	53	15	19	34	10	—	—	—	—	—
AHL totals			110	35	59	94	41	4	1	3	4	2
CHL totals			146	70	75	145	67	20	13	12	25	23
NHL totals			18	5	3	8	4	—	—	—	—	—

Preceded by Doug MacLean	General Manager of the Columbus Blue Jackets; 2007–2013	Succeeded by Jarmo Kekäläinen

Preceded by David Andrews	President and CEO of the American Hockey League; 2020–present	Succeeded by incumbent
