= Columbus Blue Jackets =

National Hockey League team in Columbus, Ohio

- 2026–27 Columbus Blue Jackets season
- Conference: Eastern
- Division: Metropolitan
- Founded: 2000
- History: Columbus Blue Jackets; 2000–present
- Home arena: Nationwide Arena
- City: Columbus, Ohio
- Team colors: Union blue, goal red, capital silver, white
- Media: FanDuel Sports Network Ohio; Columbus Alternative (105.7 FM); The Fan (97.1 FM); ESPN Columbus (1460 AM)
- Owner: John P. McConnell
- General manager: Don Waddell
- Head coach: Rick Bowness
- Captain: Vacant
- Minor league affiliates: Cleveland Monsters (AHL); Wheeling Nailers (ECHL)
- Stanley Cups: 0
- Conference championships: 0
- Presidents' Trophies: 0
- Division championships: 0
- Official website: nhl.com/bluejackets

The Columbus Blue Jackets (colloquially known as the Jackets) are a professional ice hockey team based in Columbus, Ohio. The Blue Jackets compete in the National Hockey League (NHL) as a member of the Metropolitan Division in the Eastern Conference. The franchise began play as an expansion team in 2000.

The franchise struggled in their initial years, failing to win 30 games in a season until 2005–06. The team qualified for the Stanley Cup playoffs for the first time in 2009, but were swept by the defending Stanley Cup champion Detroit Red Wings in the first round. Columbus did not win a playoff game until the 2014 playoffs against the Pittsburgh Penguins, and won their first playoff series in 2019 against the Tampa Bay Lightning, and in the process becoming the first team in NHL history to sweep the Presidents' Trophy winners in the first round. Along with the Seattle Kraken (started play in 2021) and Utah Mammoth (started play in 2024), the Blue Jackets are one of only three teams in the league who have yet to appear in the conference finals in their respective conferences.

The Blue Jackets' name and logos are inspired by Ohio's Civil War history. The Blue Jackets play their home games at Nationwide Arena in downtown Columbus, which opened in 2000. They are affiliated with the Cleveland Monsters of the AHL.

== History ==
=== Building a new franchise (1997–2000) ===
Prior to the establishment of the Blue Jackets, the last NHL team in the state of Ohio was the Cleveland Barons, who played from 1976 to 1978. In Columbus, the Blue Jackets replaced the Columbus Chill of the ECHL, who played in the city from 1991 to 1999. The Chill played at the Ohio Expo Center Coliseum, where they set a minor league hockey record by selling out 83 consecutive games.

In November 1996, five investors formed a partnership called Columbus Hockey Limited, who then submitted an application and a $100,000 fee to the NHL office. The voters of Columbus were considering a referendum to build a publicly financed arena, a major step toward approval of their NHL bid. When League Commissioner Gary Bettman visited Columbus to meet with the community's leaders about the franchise proposal, there was concern that the voters might not pass the needed referendum. The civic leaders told Bettman that they would not be willing to foot the bill for the team if the referendum failed. However, just after the meeting adjourned, John H. McConnell (one of those who entered the bid) privately guaranteed Bettman that an arena would be built, referendum or not.

Columbus' hopes for the bid dimmed when the May referendum failed. However, Nationwide announced on May 31, 1997, that it would finance the $150-million arena. Subsequently, on June 25, 1997, the NHL announced that Columbus would receive a new franchise. Afterwards a "Name the Team" contest was held with the help of Wendy's throughout central Ohio during the month of August 1997. The franchise received 14,000 entries and, with help from the NHL, narrowed the list down to 10 names. Then, with the information received from owner McConnell regarding Columbus' history, the league and the franchise narrowed the list of potential names down to two – Blue Jackets and Justice. The former, which referenced Ohio's contributions to the American Civil War, was eventually announced as the team name in November.

On June 23, 2000, the NHL's two newest teams, the Blue Jackets and the Minnesota Wild, took part in the 2000 NHL expansion draft in Calgary. Under the draft's rules, 26 of the NHL's active 28 teams were allowed to protect one goaltender, five defensemen, and nine forwards, or two goaltenders, three defensemen, and seven forwards. The Atlanta Thrashers and Nashville Predators both had their full rosters protected because they were the two newest teams, only being in existence for one and two years, respectively. Both the Blue Jackets and Wild had to use their first 24 selections on three goaltenders, eight defensemen, and thirteen forwards. Their final two picks could be players of any position.

With the first-overall choice, the Blue Jackets selected goaltender Rick Tabaracci from the Colorado Avalanche. Over the course of the draft, Columbus picked up goaltender Dwayne Roloson, defensemen Lyle Odelein and Mathieu Schneider, and forwards Geoff Sanderson, Turner Stevenson and Dallas Drake, among others. Instead of joining Columbus, Roloson signed with the American Hockey League's Worcester IceCats, Schneider left for the Los Angeles Kings, and the St. Louis Blues signed Drake. Columbus also traded Stevenson to the New Jersey Devils to complete an earlier transaction.

The Blue Jackets and Wild were granted concessions by some franchises who could not protect their full rosters. The San Jose Sharks traded Jan Čaloun, a ninth-round pick in the 2000 NHL entry draft, and a 2001 conditional pick to Columbus; in return, the Blue Jackets agreed not to select the Sharks' unprotected goaltender Evgeni Nabokov. On June 24, at the 2000 NHL entry draft, Columbus selected Rostislav Klesla fourth overall.

=== Early years (2000–2005) ===
The Blue Jackets played their first regular season game on October 7, 2000, a 5–3 loss to the Chicago Blackhawks. Bruce Gardiner scored the franchise's first goal. Columbus finished with a 28–39–9–6 record for 71 points, last in the Central Division, and failed to qualify for the playoffs. Geoff Sanderson became the first player in team history to score 30 goals. Ron Tugnutt, who was signed in the summer of 2000, supplied solid goaltending with 22 wins, which tied the 74-year-old NHL record for wins by an expansion-team goaltender (New York Rangers' Lorne Chabot also had 22 wins in 1926–27).

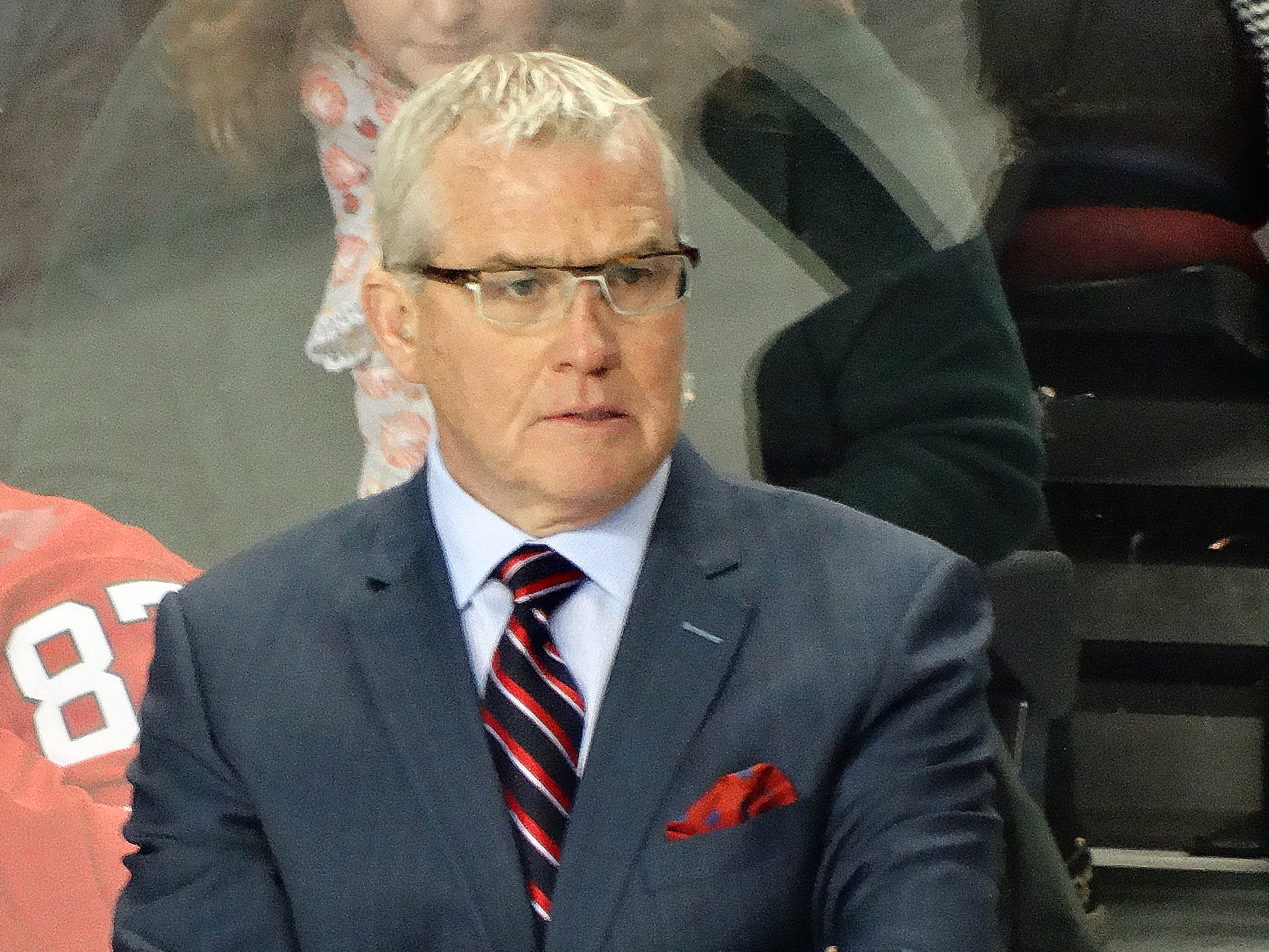
Doug MacLean was the general manager for the Blue Jackets from 1998 to 2007, and head coach from 2002 to 2004.

The Blue Jackets finished next-to-last in the NHL in the following season, with only 57 points. Ray Whitney, acquired from the Florida Panthers the previous season, led the team in scoring with 61 points, setting a franchise record. However, in March 2002, 13-year-old Brittanie Cecil was killed after a deflected puck shot by Espen Knutsen struck her in the head while she was in the stands at Nationwide Arena. As a result of her death, large nylon mesh nets were installed behind the goals in all NHL arenas to shield spectators from pucks going over the glass. The team also wore small red hearts with the initials "BNC" on their helmets.

During the off-season, the Blue Jackets traded a second-round draft pick (32nd overall) and Ron Tugnutt to the Dallas Stars in exchange for Dallas' first-round pick (20th overall) in the 2002 NHL entry draft. On the morning of the draft, Columbus traded the third-overall pick and the option to flip draft spots in 2003 to the Florida Panthers; in return, Columbus received the first-overall pick, which they used to select Rick Nash.

The 2002–03 season started with Columbus putting up a 7–5–1–1 record after the first 14 games. However, as expectations from their fans grew higher, the team came back to mediocrity, finishing last in the Central Division for the third consecutive season with 69 points and missing the playoffs once again. Dave King, who had been the team's head coach since their debut in 2000, was fired mid-season and replaced by general manager Doug MacLean. Marc Denis was named starting goaltender; he played a franchise-record 77 games that season and set a league record with 4,511 minutes played in 2002–03. He tied for second all-time for games played in a season by a goaltender, just two shy of the league record held by St. Louis Blues' Grant Fuhr in the 1995–96 season.

The 2003–04 season was another losing season for the Blue Jackets despite key additions in the off-season. Checking center Todd Marchant was signed to a five-year contract in July from the Edmonton Oilers. Defenseman Darryl Sydor, known to play strong offense as well, was acquired from the Dallas Stars for Mike Sillinger and a draft pick. MacLean stepped aside as head coach midway through the season, giving way to Gerard Gallant. The Blue Jackets finished with just 62 points (the second-lowest total in their short history), but it was enough to help them break out of last place in the Central Division for the first time, finishing ahead of the Chicago Blackhawks. Nash was one of the few bright spots for the team; his 41 goals tied Jarome Iginla and Ilya Kovalchuk for the Maurice "Rocket" Richard Trophy (as League leader in goals scored).

In the 2004 off-season, the NHL Players' Association (NHLPA) and NHL administration failed to renew their collective bargaining agreement. September 14, 2004, marked the beginning of the lockout of the 2004–05 season. No games were played and the Stanley Cup was not awarded for the first time since the flu epidemic of 1919. An agreement was made on July 13, 2005, and the lockout officially ended nine days later on July 22, 2005.

=== Nash era and rebuilding (2005–2012) ===
In the summer of 2005, rugged Colorado Avalanche defenseman Adam Foote agreed to a three-year deal with the team. Heading into the 2005–06 season, it appeared the Blue Jackets would finally take the next step and make the playoffs. Instead, injuries to Rick Nash, Rostislav Klesla and Gilbert Brulé, the team's 2005 first-round pick, led to the team putting up a dismal 9–25–1 record through its first 35 games. Superstar Sergei Fedorov was acquired from the Mighty Ducks of Anaheim; Anaheim received Tyler Wright and Francois Beauchemin, and later claimed Todd Marchant off waivers. While again failing to make the playoffs, Columbus did manage to improve. They had the best overtime record in the NHL (14–4) and finished the season with franchise records for wins (35) and points (74). For the first time ever, they earned a third-place finish in the Central Division, behind Detroit and Nashville.

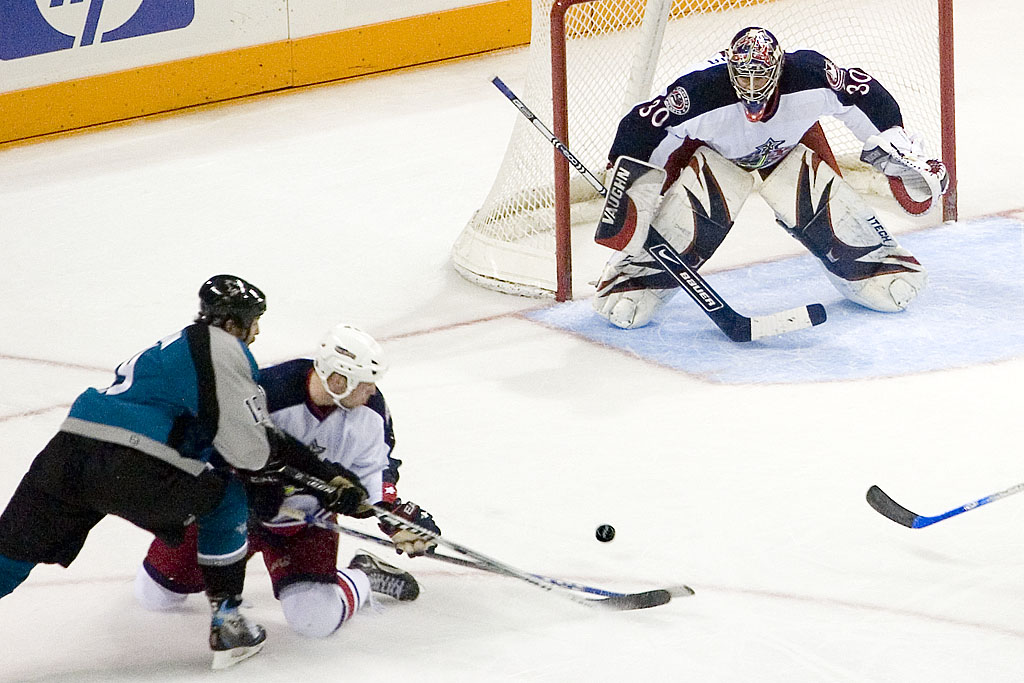
Fredrik Norrena in net for the Blue Jackets during the 2006–07 season. The Blue Jackets acquired Norrena during the 2006 off-season, in a trade with the Tampa Bay Lightning.

The 2006–07 season saw several changes made to the team. In the off-season, Marc Denis was dealt to the Tampa Bay Lightning for forward Fredrik Modin and goaltender Fredrik Norrena, making way for Pascal Leclaire to take the starting job. The Blue Jackets also signed Anson Carter when it looked as if Nikolay Zherdev would be playing the season in Russia; in late September, however, Zherdev and general manager Doug MacLean were able to reach a compromise. Partway through the season, on November 13, 2006, Gerard Gallant was relieved of his duties as head coach. The next day, Gary Agnew was named his interim replacement. On November 22, Ken Hitchcock, former coach of the Dallas Stars and Philadelphia Flyers, was named the new head coach, effective the following day. Under Hitchcock's first year, two milestones were set: on December 10, 2006, the Blue Jackets scored a team-record five power-play goals in a 6–2 win over the Ottawa Senators, and on April 3, 2007, the Blue Jackets broke the modern-day record for most times being shut-out in a season (16) with a 3–0 loss to the Detroit Red Wings.

On April 18, 2007, Doug MacLean, the team's first general manager and president, was fired after nine years and six seasons at the helm without a playoff berth. Mike Priest, president of Blue Jackets parent company JMAC, Inc., was named president of the club, while Assistant general manager Jim Clark served as general manager until the Blue Jackets named Edmonton Oilers Assistant general manager Scott Howson as the new general manager on June 15, 2007. On October 4, 2007, the Blue Jackets announced their affiliation with the Elmira Jackals, which replaced their former affiliation with the Dayton Bombers as the club's ECHL affiliate.

The 2007–08 season, the club's first full season under Hitchcock, started off well as the Jackets got off to their best start in franchise history, starting with a 4–0 shutout of the defending Stanley Cup champion Anaheim Ducks. At the trade deadline on February 26, 2008, however, apparently unable to agree on a new contract and amid some controversy, Blue Jackets captain Adam Foote requested a trade to the Colorado Avalanche, which was granted. The Blue Jackets received a pair of conditional picks in return. A few weeks later, on March 12, 2008, former Blue Jackets number-one draft pick Rick Nash was named the new team captain. Despite this, Columbus managed its best season record to date, staying above a .500 game wins average until the final game of the season and finishing fourth in the Central Division with 80 points. After the season, Nash was announced as the cover player for the NHL 2K9 video game by Take-Two Interactive.

At the 2008 NHL entry draft, the Blue Jackets selected Nikita Filatov with the sixth overall pick. They also traded away the 19th overall pick (acquired from the Colorado Avalanche in exchange for Adam Foote) for R. J. Umberger. The Blue Jackets made many trades in the 2008 off-season. Gilbert Brulé was traded to the Edmonton Oilers for Raffi Torres. Enigmatic forward Nikolay Zherdev and Dan Fritsche were traded to the New York Rangers in exchange for defensemen Fedor Tyutin and Christian Bäckman. The Blue Jackets also signed free agents Kristian Huselius and Mike Commodore to multi-year contracts. On July 9, 2008, the Blue Jackets announced they signed Hitchcock to a three-year extension to remain as head coach.

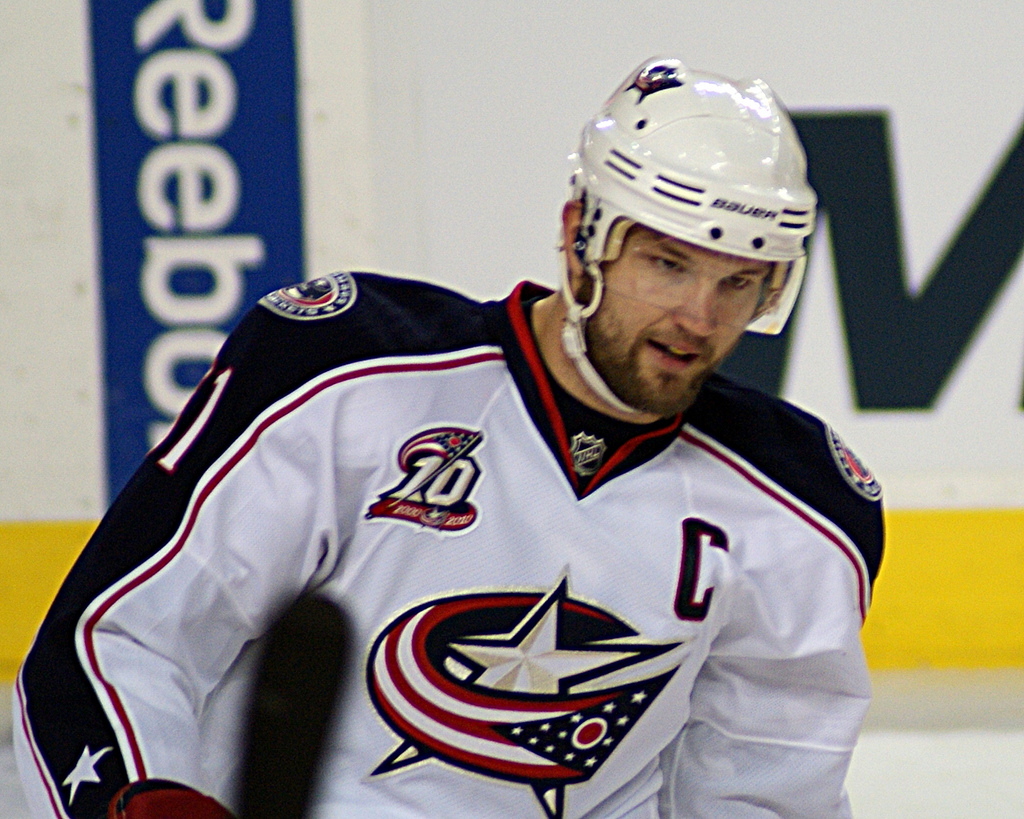
Named team captain on March 12, 2008, Rick Nash served in that role until he was traded to the New York Rangers on July 23, 2012.

During the 2008–09 season, the Blue Jackets made two trades which greatly played to their benefit. Forward Jason Williams was acquired from the Atlanta Thrashers in exchange for defenseman Clay Wilson and a sixth-round draft pick. The Blue Jackets were also involved with the first major deal of the 2009 NHL trade deadline, by trading goaltender Pascal Leclaire and a second-round draft pick to the Ottawa Senators for skilled center Antoine Vermette. The changes in scenery benefited both players and the Jackets; Williams scored 28 points in his first 36 games as a Jacket, while Vermette scored 11 points in his first 14 games with the team. Rick Nash scored 79 points throughout the season, setting a franchise record.

On April 8, 2009, the Columbus Blue Jackets secured the first Stanley Cup playoff berth in the franchise's eight-year history with a 4–3 shootout win over the Chicago Blackhawks. However, they were swept in the first round by the Detroit Red Wings in four games, and would not qualify for the playoffs for the next four seasons. With 21 games remaining and sitting four points out of eighth in the Western Conference, the Blue Jackets dealt long time defenseman Rostislav Klesla and Dane Byers to the Phoenix Coyotes in exchange for Scottie Upshall and Sami Lepistö at the trade deadline on February 28, 2011.

In the 2011 off-season, in an attempt to make a serious playoff run, the Blue Jackets traded 2007 first-round pick Jakub Voráček, their 2011 first-round pick (Sean Couturier) and a third-round pick (Nick Cousins) to the Philadelphia Flyers for All-Star center Jeff Carter. They also signed several free agents: James Wisniewski, Václav Prospal and Radek Martínek. However, after a disastrous start to the 2011–12 season that saw the firing of head coach Scott Arniel, Carter was traded to the Los Angeles Kings for Jack Johnson and a conditional first-round pick after playing just 39 games with the Blue Jackets. The Blue Jackets also traded veteran centers Antoine Vermette and Samuel Påhlsson for goaltender Curtis McElhinney and several draft picks at the trade deadline. There was also heavy speculation that captain Rick Nash would be traded at the deadline. Although Nash was not traded, general manager Scott Howson publicly announced that he had privately requested a trade, a move that has stirred up much controversy. Nash was eventually traded to the New York Rangers on July 23, 2012, for Brandon Dubinsky, Artem Anisimov, prospect Tim Erixon and a 2013 first-round draft pick. At the 2012 NHL entry draft, the Blue Jackets traded their second and fourth round picks to the Philadelphia Flyers for the eventual winner of the Vezina Trophy, goaltender Sergei Bobrovsky (2012–13).

The 2012–13 lockout and season saw changes to the executive and front office of the organization. John Davidson was named as president of hockey operations for the Blue Jackets on October 24. On February 12, Scott Howson was relieved of his duties as general manager. Jarmo Kekäläinen, who had previously worked with Davidson in St. Louis, was hired away from Jokerit of the Finnish SM-liiga to be the new general manager becoming the first European born general manager in the NHL. The Blue Jackets then traded for All-Star forward Marián Gáborík. The Blue Jackets just missed the playoffs via a tiebreaker against the Minnesota Wild, who had more regulation and overtime wins (ROW).

=== The Kekäläinen years (2013–2024) ===
==== Move into the Eastern Conference ====
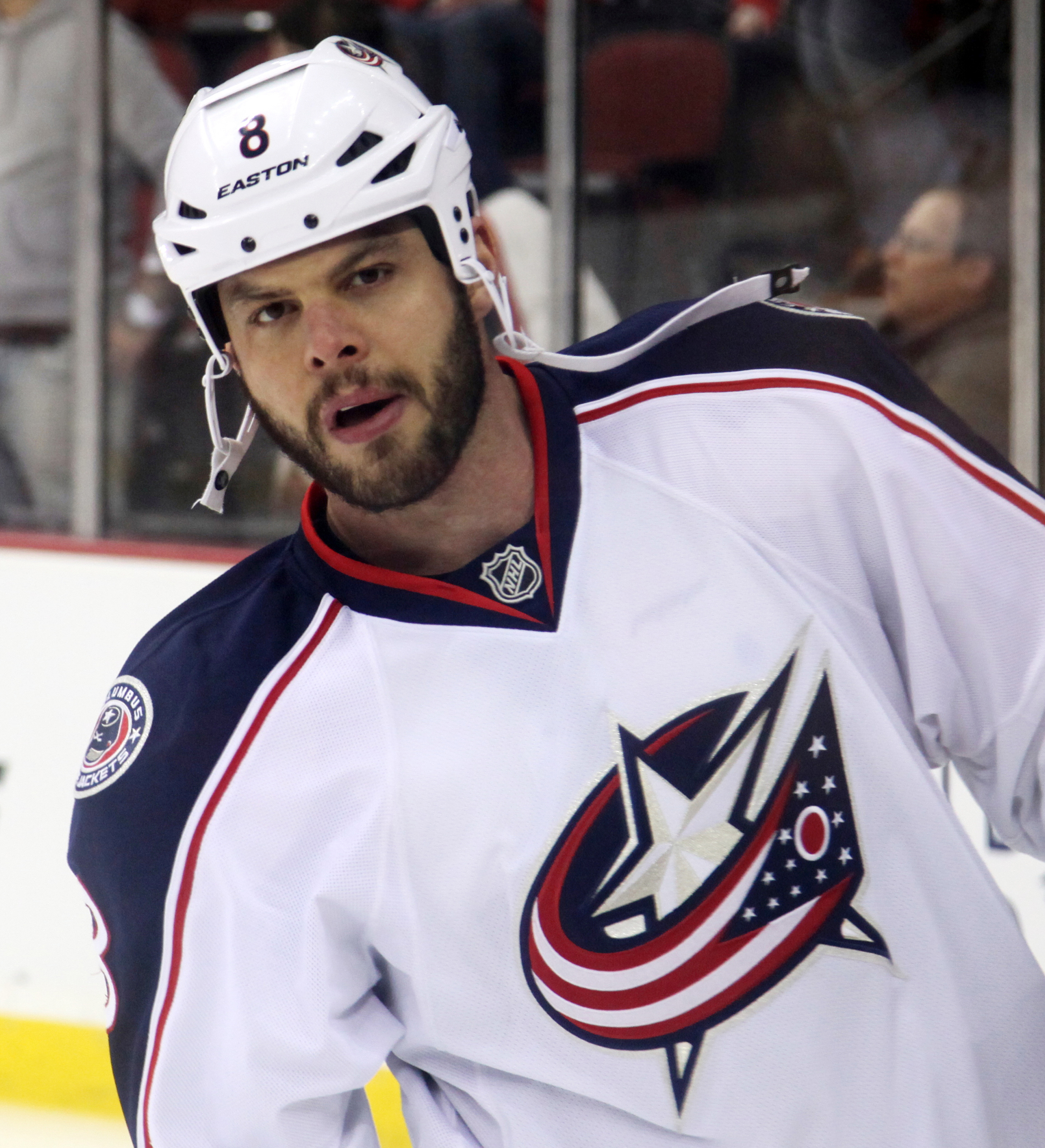
Nathan Horton during the 2013–14 season. As a result of a postponed game, Horton became the only player in NHL history to have registered a goal, without suiting up for that game.

The Blue Jackets moved into the Metropolitan Division of the Eastern Conference in the 2013–14 season after spending its first 13 seasons in the Central Division of the Western Conference. The other teams in the Metropolitan Division consist of the Carolina Hurricanes, New Jersey Devils, New York Islanders, New York Rangers, Philadelphia Flyers, Pittsburgh Penguins and Washington Capitals, the latter six of which once composed the old Patrick Division. On April 9, 2014, the Blue Jackets clinched their second playoff spot in franchise history by winning a 3–1 game against the Dallas Stars. This game was also noted for being a game resumed after being postponed on March 10, 2014, due to Rich Peverley's cardiac event in which the Blue Jackets led 1–0. The NHL decided to keep the goal scored by Nathan Horton and resumed the game with a full 60 minutes. Nathan Horton made history by being credited for scoring a goal while not suiting up for the game.

The Blue Jackets faced the Pittsburgh Penguins in the first round of the 2014 Stanley Cup playoffs. This series had a trend that was noted for making 3–1 leads end up as 4–3 loss. Games 1 and 2 were at the Consol Energy Center in downtown Pittsburgh. The Blue Jackets made a large jump in history when Jack Johnson scored the first goal of the game. This was the first time in franchise history that Columbus ever led a postseason game. The Jackets lead the game 3–1 at one point from goals by Mark Letestu and Derek MacKenzie. However, the Penguins rallied to win it 4–3. Game 2 was the opposite. Pittsburgh led 3–1 at one point, but Columbus rallied to win game 2 4–3 by an overtime goal from Matt Calvert. This was the first playoff victory in franchise history. Pittsburgh won game 3 by a score of 4–3. Game 4 was a memorable night at Nationwide Arena. Columbus was down 3–0, and 3–1 by the end of the first period. Boone Jenner and Ryan Johansen scored to make it 3–2 by the end of the second period. Brandon Dubinsky scored the game-tying goal with 22.5 seconds left in regulation, after a miss-play with the puck by Marc-André Fleury. Nick Foligno went on to score the game-winning goal in overtime. In the locker room during intermission, he supposedly told the team that he will score the game-winner. Pittsburgh, however, went on to win the next two games and took the best-of-seven series in six games.

The 2014–15 season was most notable for the number of injuries the Jackets incurred. The Jackets lead the league in man-games lost with 502. At one point, the injured reserve list consisted of 15 players, including stars Sergei Bobrovsky, Brandon Dubinsky, Jack Johnson, and Ryan Murray. When the team's injured players began to return in late February, they were able to accumulate wins the way they had the previous two seasons and in the process, set a franchise record earning nine consecutive wins. However, the Blue Jackets still finished fifth in the Metropolitan Division and missed the playoffs by nine points despite a 42–35–5 record. On May 20, 2015, Nick Foligno was named the sixth captain in team history. The position had been vacant since Rick Nash was traded to the New York Rangers in July 2012. On June 30, 2015, the Jackets traded centers Marko Daňo and Artem Anisimov, along with wingers Jeremy Morin and Corey Tropp, to the Chicago Blackhawks in exchange for Brandon Saad. This move was the subject of much controversy in Chicago since Blackhawks general manager Stan Bowman had publicly said that Saad was going to be a part of the organization for many years to come. The Jackets also acquired Michael Paliotta and Alex Broadhurst in the trade. The Jackets signed center Gregory Campbell from the Boston Bruins a few days later.

==== Tortorella era (2015–2021) ====
The Blue Jackets initially went into the 2015–16 season with high expectations. However, the team got off to an inauspicious start by losing their first eight regular season games in regulation, the second longest losing streak to start a season in NHL history. This prompted the Jackets to fire head coach Todd Richards and hire John Tortorella in his place. On January 6, 2016, the Blue Jackets traded Ryan Johansen to the Nashville Predators in exchange for defenseman Seth Jones. The Blue Jackets record at the end of the season was 34–40–8, and were ranked 27th overall in the NHL. They closed out the season on a high note, however, as they won the season finale against the defending Stanley Cup champions, the Chicago Blackhawks, overcoming a 3–0 deficit after the first period to win 5–4 in overtime.

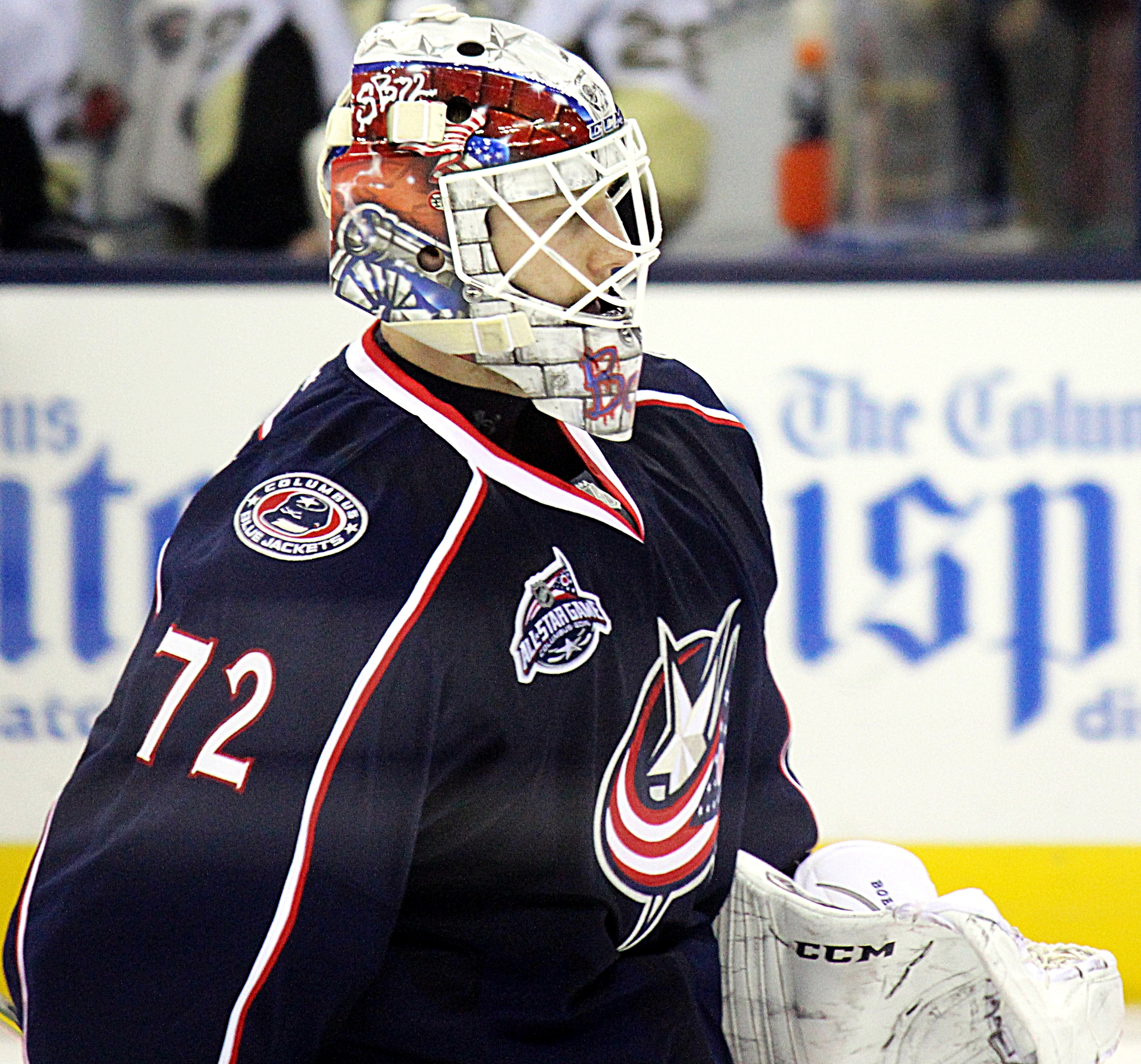
Sergei Bobrovsky was awarded his second Vezina Trophy for his performance in the 2016–17 season.

The Blue Jackets set three franchise records during the 2016–17 season. On November 4, 2016, the Blue Jackets scored a franchise-record ten goals in a 10–0 shutout win against the Montreal Canadiens, becoming the first team to do so since 2011 (when the St. Louis Blues beat the Detroit Red Wings 10–3). In mid-November, the Blue Jackets got a franchise record seventh consecutive win at home. During a franchise-record 16-game win streak that started in late November, Tortorella recorded his 500th career win in a 4–3 Blue Jackets overtime win on the road against the Vancouver Canucks, becoming the first American-born head coach to reach 500 wins. The team had a record of 14–0–0 in December. The team's win streak ended in early January when they lost 5–0 to the Washington Capitals. The win streak was the second longest in NHL history behind the 1992–93 Pittsburgh Penguins' 17 consecutive games. The team finished with a record of 50–24–8 and 108 points, setting a franchise record.

During the first round of the 2017 playoffs, the Blue Jackets were placed in a matchup against the Pittsburgh Penguins. The team lost three straight games to begin the series, but won the fourth game to save themselves from elimination. This game in which they won 5–4 marked the Blue Jackets' first regulation win in the Stanley Cup playoffs. Despite this, they would ultimately lose the series in five games. In the following off-season, on June 23, 2017, the Jackets made another deal with the Blackhawks sending Brandon Saad back to Chicago for Artemi Panarin and Tyler Motte.

The Blue Jackets returned to the playoffs in 2018 as a wild card qualifier, going in back-to-back years for the first time. There they faced the Metropolitan Division champion Washington Capitals in the first round, winning the first two games in overtime and their first series lead. However, they lost the next four games and the series in six games.

In 2019, the Blue Jackets, with expiring contracts, went all-in at the trade deadline, acquiring Matt Duchene and Ryan Dzingel, along with several other players. They qualified for the 2019 playoffs as the second wild card, where they swept the Presidents' Trophy winner Tampa Bay Lightning in the first round to win their first ever playoff series, but lost their second round series in six games to the Boston Bruins. The Blue Jackets would then lose long-time starting goaltender Sergei Bobrovsky, Matt Duchene, and the team's leader in points, Artemi Panarin, in free agency during the 2019 off-season.

On March 12, 2020, the 2019–20 season was paused due to the COVID-19 pandemic, with the remainder of the regular season being officially canceled on May 26. On August 1, the season would resume and follow a 24-team playoff format. The Blue Jackets advanced to the playoffs after defeating the Toronto Maple Leafs in five games in the qualifying round. The Blue Jackets then faced the Tampa Bay Lightning in a first round rematch of last season. They lost game 1 in the fifth overtime period, and went on to lose the series in five games.

During the 2020 off-season, star forward Pierre-Luc Dubois signed a two-year extension with the Blue Jackets but would later request a trade from the team. The shortened 56-game 2020–21 season saw the Blue Jackets placed and struggle in the Central Division, under the NHL's realigned divisions. After being benched for the second and third periods in what would be his last game with the team on January 21, 2021, Dubois, along with a 2022 third-round pick, was traded to the Winnipeg Jets in exchange for wingers Patrik Laine and Jack Roslovic on January 23. Veteran players David Savard and captain Nick Foligno would also be traded to the Tampa Bay Lightning and the Toronto Maple Leafs, respectively. The team finished last in their division, with a dismal 18–26–12 record, missing the playoffs for the first time since 2016. Tortorella and the Blue Jackets would then part ways after six seasons.

==== Rebuilding and the Gaudreau era (2021–2024) ====
The departures of Tortorella and several key players in the past few seasons threw the Blue Jackets into another rebuild, starting with the promotion of assistant coach Brad Larsen to head coach on June 10, 2021. Seth Jones would then be traded to the Chicago Blackhawks in exchange for defenseman Adam Boqvist and a 2021 first-round pick (Cole Sillinger), and Cam Atkinson to the Philadelphia Flyers for former first-round pick Jakub Voráček.

The 2021–22 season saw the Blue Jackets return to the Metropolitan Division as the NHL reverted to its 82-game regular season. In their season-opening game against the Arizona Coyotes, the team honored backup goaltender Matīss Kivlenieks, who had tragically died in a fireworks accident during the off-season, on July 4, 2021. They raised his number to hang inside Nationwide Arena for the duration of the season. His family also performed a ceremonial puck drop and goaltender Elvis Merzļikins was allowed to wear #80 during said game. They had also established the Matiss Kivlenieks Memorial Fund in his memory in order to promote the growth of hockey in Columbus and his homeland of Latvia.

On October 12, 2021, Boone Jenner was named the seventh captain in franchise history. Under his captaincy, the Blue Jackets started their season with a strong 7–3–0 record in their first ten games, even defeating the eventual Stanley Cup champions Colorado Avalanche in back-to-back games. Despite an improved offense and scoring capabilities, issues with defense and special teams caught up with the team as the season progressed, finishing among the top 10 teams with the highest goals against average. On April 16, 2022, they were officially eliminated from playoff contention when the Washington Capitals defeated the Montreal Canadiens. They finished sixth in their division, with a 37–38–7 record and 81 points.

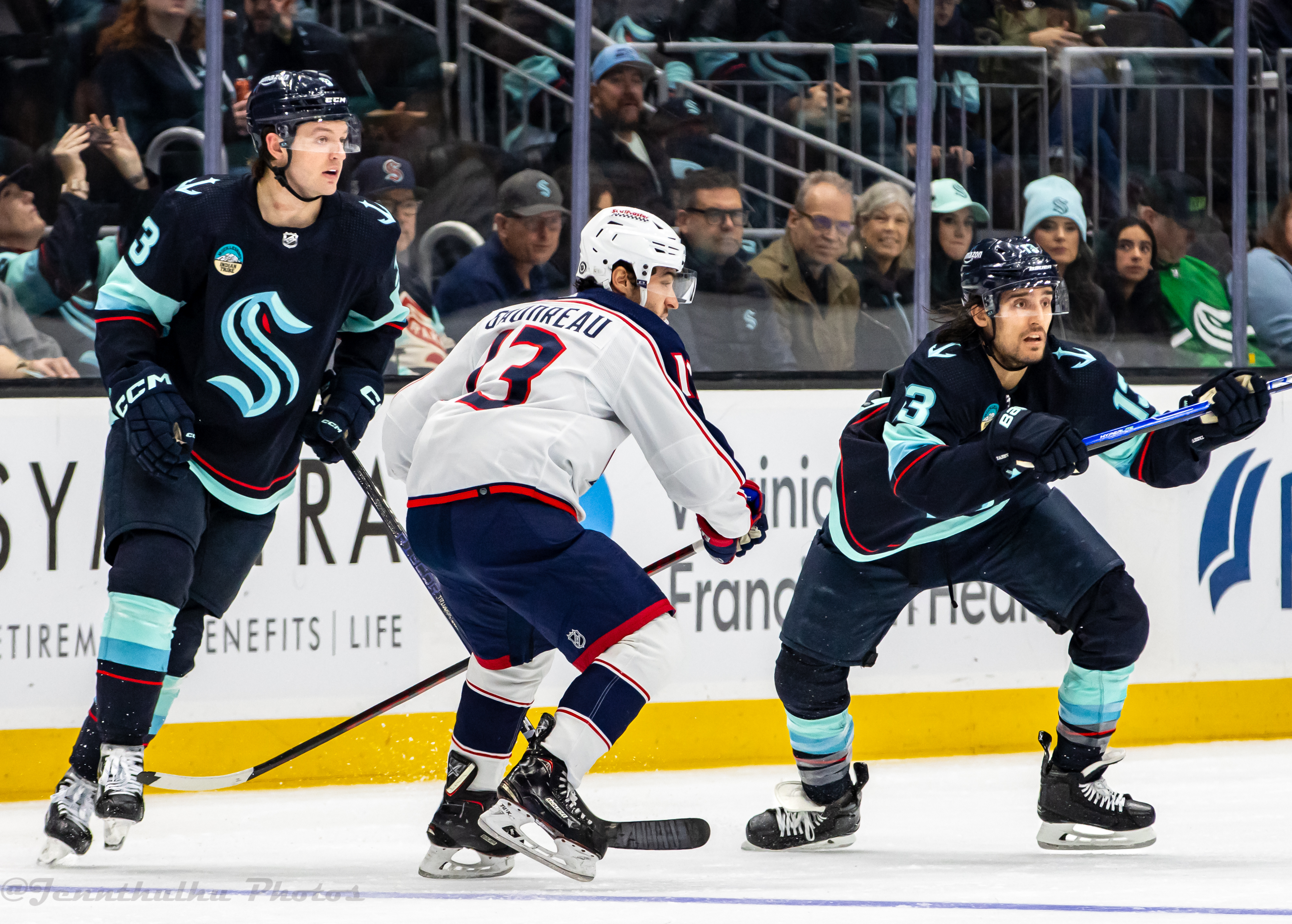
Johnny Gaudreau (center) playing for the Blue Jackets in a game against the Seattle Kraken during the 2023–24 season

During the 2022 free agency, the Blue Jackets shocked the hockey world by signing Calgary Flames superstar Johnny Gaudreau to a seven-year contract, following the signing of his teammate, defenseman Erik Gudbranson, to a four-year contract on July 13, 2022. The Gaudreau signing stunned hockey fans and media alike as the franchise had gained a reputation of being unable to sign or retain star players. Gaudreau, who had reportedly been linked to other Metro teams like the New Jersey Devils, New York Islanders, and Philadelphia Flyers for weeks, decided to play for less compensation for Columbus, citing their potential as a young team and that he came there "to win hockey games." Subsequently, in order to re-sign Laine to what would be a four-year contract after the blockbuster signings, the Blue Jackets traded winger Oliver Bjorkstrand to the Seattle Kraken for 2023 late-round picks.

In the 2022–23 season, amid expectations of being a competitive team, the Blue Jackets could not overcome their defensive issues and man games lost due to injuries, especially that of top defenseman Zach Werenski, consistently placing them at the bottom of their division and of the league. The "lost" season would see the Blue Jackets trade forwards Gustav Nyquist to the Minnesota Wild and Jakub Voráček to the Arizona Coyotes; and backup goaltender Joonas Korpisalo and defenseman Vladislav Gavrikov to the Los Angeles Kings for draft picks and prospects. Two-time Stanley Cup-winning goaltender Jonathan Quick, also acquired from the Kings, would be traded to the Vegas Golden Knights in less than two days. On March 17, 2023, the Blue Jackets were eliminated from playoff contention in their 68th game, after a 7–4 loss to the Anaheim Ducks. They finished eighth in their division, with a dismal 25–48–9 record and 59 points, and were 31st in the league. On April 15, 2023, they relieved Brad Larsen of his duties as head coach.

For the 2023–24 season, the Blue Jackets made several changes in the off-season. They looked to improve their blue line by trading for Ivan Provorov from the Philadelphia Flyers on June 6, 2023, and then for Damon Severson from the New Jersey Devils three days later. On July 1, they hired Mike Babcock as their new head coach amid much controversy, as he had a reputation of mistreating players. In the 2023 NHL entry draft, they used their third overall pick to draft center Adam Fantilli from the University of Michigan. Babcock resigned on September 17, after allegations of improper behavior via the Spittin' Chiclets podcast led to an NHLPA investigation into his conduct. He announced his resignation as head coach before the start of the preseason, with Pascal Vincent being named his successor. On February 15, 2024, the Blue Jackets fired general manager Jarmo Kekäläinen, ending an 11-year tenure that included the team’s first playoff series win in 2019. On May 28, Don Waddell was hired as president of hockey operations and general manager, while John Davidson transitioned to a senior advisor role within the organization. The team struggled once again, finishing with a 27–43–12 record and last in the Metropolitan Division.

On June 17, 2024, the Blue Jackets fired Vincent, with former Minnesota Wild coach Dean Evason named his successor on July 22. On August 29, ahead of the 2024–25 season, Gaudreau and his younger brother Matthew were both killed by a driver suspected of drunk driving while cycling in Oldmans Township, New Jersey. The tragedy was met with tributes from around the NHL and wider sports world, as well as an impromptu memorial established by fans at Nationwide Arena.

After falling short of the playoffs in 2026, the off-season marked the end of Boone Jenner with the team signing a contract with the Washington Capitals. After taking over from Dean Evason on January 12, 2026, and leading the team to a 21–11–5 record. Rick Bowness signed a one-year extension in the 2026 off-season. On September 28, 2026, Kirill Marchenko was traded to the Toronto Maple Leafs, as part of a package that sent Matthew Knies alongside Steven Lorentz, Emil Andrae, and a conditional 2027 second-round draft pick to Columbus.

== Team information ==
=== Team name ===
The name "Blue Jackets" was chosen to celebrate "patriotism, pride, and the rich Civil War history in the state of Ohio and city of Columbus." When President Abraham Lincoln requested that Ohio raise ten regiments at the outbreak of the Civil War, the state responded by raising a total of 23 volunteer infantry regiments for three months of service. Ohio also produced a number of great Civil War figures, including William Tecumseh Sherman, Ulysses S. Grant, Philip Sheridan and George Custer; Sherman himself being a native of Lancaster, Ohio, about a 33-mile (53 km) drive from Columbus along U.S. Route 33 and is home to his childhood home and museum. Columbus itself was host to large military bases, Camp Chase and Camp Thomas, which saw hundreds of thousands of Union soldiers and thousands of Confederate prisoners during the Civil War.

=== Logos and jerseys ===
The primary logo for the franchise from 2000 to 2007

The team logo is a stylized version of the flag of Ohio, which is a burgee (i.e., swallowtail pennant), in the form of a "C" wrapped around a star, representing both patriotism and Columbus's status as state capital. Previously used as an alternate logo starting in 2003, it became the primary logo as part of a Reebok-sponsored redesign for the 2007–08 season. The original logo had a red ribbon with 13 stars representing the Thirteen Colonies, unfurled in the shape of the team's initials, CBJ, with an electric gold hockey stick cutting through the center to represent the "J." An additional star atop the stick represented Columbus's status as state capital.

Since their inception, the Blue Jackets have worn navy and white jerseys with red pants. The initial uniforms had the "CBJ" crest on the chest and an alternate "Stinger" logo on the shoulders. In 2003, "Stinger" was replaced by the new "flag" logo, which also served as the main crest of their navy alternate jersey. This design contained black stripes and three stars on the sleeves, along with the "CBJ" crest on the shoulders.

In 2007, with Reebok now the league's uniform supplier, the Blue Jackets promoted their alternates to primary status, removing the black elements and using only one star on the sleeve. In 2010, they added an alternate navy uniform, unveiling a new "cannon" crest while replacing red with light blue, silver and vintage white accents. The "cannon" crest later replaced the "CBJ" on the primary uniforms in 2015, recolored to the red and navy color scheme, while letters and numbers were updated in 2017. Besides some slight tweaks to the lettering and a one-year absence in the 2017–18 season following the NHL's move to Adidas, the Blue Jackets continued to wear the navy and vintage white alternates since.

For the 2020–21 season, the Blue Jackets would wear "Reverse Retro" alternate uniforms designed by Adidas. The uniform resembled the original white "Stinger" uniforms from 2000 to 2007 but with a red base and white sleeve stripes.

Starting with the 2022–23 season, the Blue Jackets' road white uniform would be paired with blue pants, a combination the team previously wore on May 1, 2021, against the Carolina Hurricanes. The blue pants were also used with the "Reverse Retro" uniform during that season. Also during the season, the Blue Jackets unveiled their second "Reverse Retro" uniform, using the 2003–2007 alternate uniform but with a black base and light blue stripes taken from their current alternates.

For the team's 2025 Stadium Series game, they wore dark blue uniforms and pants with white, silver and red trim. The main crest featured the "cannon" logo in front, and the shoulders featured a new "CBJ" patch with two crossed hockey sticks as a nod to the unit designation pins found in front of a soldier's slouch caps. An outline of Ohio surrounds the captain and alternate captain patches, along with a star on the right leg. Enlarged numbers and letters were used for the uniform.

In the 2026–27 season, the Blue Jackets wore alternate "Hometown Remix" uniforms featuring a gray base, navy, light blue and white stripes, and several design cues taken from their 2025 Stadium Series uniform.

=== "The Cannon" ===
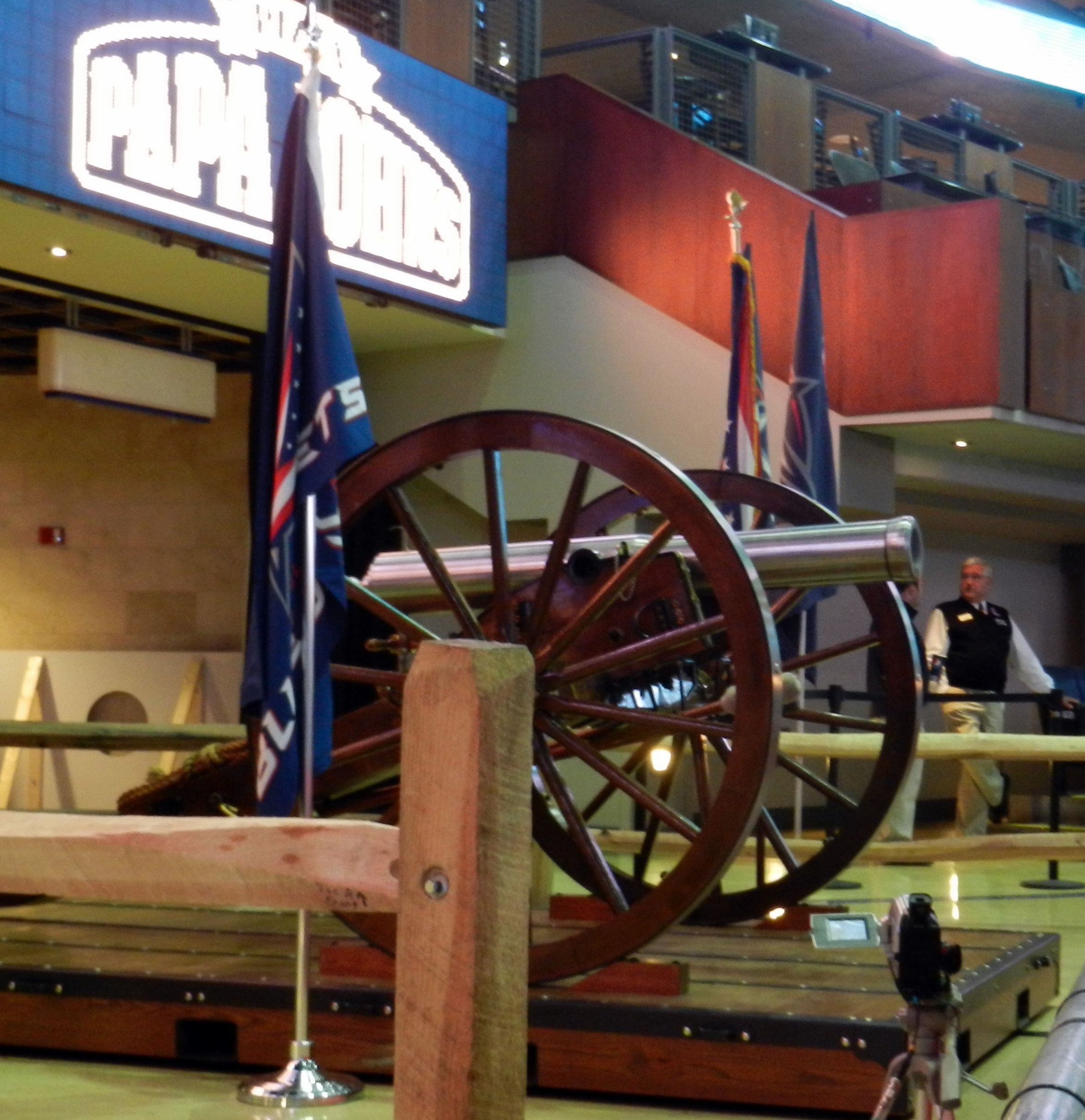
A replica 1857 Napoleon is "fired" at Nationwide Arena as the Blue Jackets take the ice, when they score, and when they have won the game.

Prior to the start of the 2007–08 season, the Blue Jackets organization brought a hand-made replica 1857 Napoleon cannon into Nationwide Arena. The cannon is "fired" at home games whenever:

- the Blue Jackets take the ice at the start of the game
- the Blue Jackets score a goal
- the Blue Jackets win the game

When the Blue Jackets score a goal, the title line of "For Those About to Rock (We Salute You)" by AC/DC is played when the cannon is fired followed by the chorus of "The Whip" by Locksley.

=== Broadcast ===
On FanDuel Sports Network Ohio, Steve Mears serves as the television play-by-play announcer alongside former Blue Jacket Jody Shelley providing color analysis. Brian Giesenschlag is the host of Blue Jackets Live, the televised pre-game, intermission and post-game shows, with former Blue Jacket Jean-Luc Grand-Pierre.

On radio stations WBNS-FM (flagship), WBNS (flagship), WXZX (alternative flagship that airs games that conflict with WBNS's and WBNS-FM's coverage of Ohio State football or men's basketball), and 34 other affiliates in Ohio and West Virginia, Bob McElligott provides play-by-play coverage. McElligott joined the Blue Jackets radio broadcast in July 2009 as a color analyst and became the play-by-play analyst for the 2013–14 season, taking over for George Matthews who had been calling Blue Jackets games since the team's inception in 2000. McElligott, along with Dylan Tyrer, hosts the pre-game and post-game radio shows. Fans can interact by e-mail and Twitter with McElligott and Tyrer during and after the game.

=== Mascot ===
Stinger is the official mascot of the Blue Jackets. Stinger is a 6-foot 9-inch Yellow Jacket that walks amongst the crowd during the games and skates on the ice between periods while wearing a Blue Jackets jersey and a blue hat. Stingers eyebrows are black hockey sticks. Stinger was originally yellow, but was changed to green, eventually mixing with the team's blue. The image of Stinger was on the original Blue Jackets jerseys, eventually being removed in 2003. The team also had another mascot, an anthropomorphic cannon named Boomer, for half of the 2010–11 season.

== Season-by-season record ==
This is a partial list of the last five seasons completed by the Blue Jackets. For the full season-by-season history, see List of Columbus Blue Jackets seasons

Note: GP = Games played, W = Wins, L = Losses, T = Ties, OTL = Overtime Losses, Pts = Points, GF = Goals for, GA = Goals against

Season	GP	W	L	OTL	Pts	GF	GA	Finish	Playoffs
2021–22	82	37	38	7	81	262	300	6th, Metropolitan	Did not qualify
2022–23	82	25	48	9	59	214	330	8th, Metropolitan	Did not qualify
2023–24	82	27	43	12	66	237	300	8th, Metropolitan	Did not qualify
2024–25	82	40	33	9	89	273	268	4th, Metropolitan	Did not qualify
2025–26	82	40	30	12	92	253	253	5th, Metropolitan	Did not qualify

== Players and personnel ==
=== Current roster ===
Updated November 19, 2026

No.	Nat	Player	Pos	S/G	Age	Acquired	Birthplace
2	(Canada)	Jake Christiansen	D	L	27	2020	West Vancouver, British Columbia
3	(United States)	Charlie Coyle (A)	C	R	34	2025	Weymouth, Massachusetts
93	(Canada)	Luca Del Bel Belluz	C	L	23	2022	Woodbridge, Ontario
15	(Canada)	Dante Fabbro	D	R	28	2024	Coquitlam, British Columbia
19	(Canada)	Adam Fantilli	C	L	22	2023	Nobleton, Ontario
83	(United States)	Conor Garland	RW	R	30	2026	Scituate, Massachusetts
73	(Canada)	Jet Greaves	G	L	25	2022	Cambridge, Ontario
44	(Canada)	Erik Gudbranson	D	R	34	2022	Ottawa, Ontario
91	(Canada)	Kent Johnson	C	L	24	2021	Port Moody, British Columbia
89	(United States)	Matthew Knies	LW	L	24	2026	Phoenix, Arizona
94	(Canada)	Ryan Lomberg	LW	L	31	2026	Richmond Hill, Ontario
18	(Canada)	Steven Lorentz	C	L	30	2026	Kitchener, Ontario
21	(Sweden)	Isac Lundeström	C	L	27	2025	Gällivare, Sweden
5	(Canada)	Denton Mateychuk	D	L	22	2022	Dominion City, Manitoba
23	(Canada)	Sean Monahan (A)	C	L	32	2024	Brampton, Ontario
43	(Russia)	Valeri Nichushkin	RW	L	31	2026	Chelyabinsk, Russia
24	(United States)	Mathieu Olivier (A)	RW	R	29	2022	Biloxi, Mississippi
9	(Russia)	Ivan Provorov	D	L	29	2023	Yaroslavl, Russia
78	(Canada)	Damon Severson	D	R	32	2023	Brandon, Manitoba
4	(Canada)	Cole Sillinger (A)	C	L	23	2021	Columbus, Ohio
33	(Canada)	Cam Talbot	G	L	39	2026	Caledonia, Ontario
10	(Russia)	Dmitri Voronkov	C	L	26	2019	Angarsk, Russia
8	(United States)	Zach Werenski (A)	D	L	29	2015	Grosse Pointe, Michigan
29	(United States)	Jack Williams	RW	R	24	2025	Biddeford, Maine

=== Team captains ===
- Lyle Odelein, 2000–2002
- Ray Whitney, 2002–2003
- Luke Richardson, 2003–2005
- Adam Foote, 2005–2008
- Rick Nash, 2008–2012
- Nick Foligno, 2015–2021
- Boone Jenner, 2021–2026

=== Retired numbers ===
The NHL retired Wayne Gretzky's No. 99 for all its member teams at the 2000 NHL All-Star Game.

Columbus Blue Jackets retired numbers
No.	Player	Position	Career	No. retirement
61	Rick Nash	LW	2002–2012	March 5, 2022

=== Honored members ===
- Johnny Gaudreau
- John H. McConnell

=== Hall of Famers ===
- Sergei Fedorov, C, 2005–2008
- Ken Hitchcock, coach, 2006–2010

=== First-round draft picks ===
- 2000: Rostislav Klesla (4th overall)
- 2001: Pascal Leclaire (8th overall)
- 2002: Rick Nash (1st overall) (Note: The Blue Jackets acquired the first overall pick from the Florida Panthers for the third overall pick (Jay Bouwmeester) and the option to swap 2003 first-round draft picks (not exercised) on June 22, 2002.)
- 2003: Nikolay Zherdev (4th overall)
- 2004: Alexandre Picard (8th overall) (Note: The Blue Jackets acquired the eighth overall pick along with the 59th pick (Kyle Wharton) from the Carolina Hurricanes for the fourth overall pick (Andrew Ladd) on June 26, 2004.)
- 2005: Gilbert Brulé (6th overall)
- 2006: Derick Brassard (6th overall)
- 2007: Jakub Voráček (7th overall)
- 2008: Nikita Filatov (6th overall)
- 2009: John Moore (21st overall)
- 2010: Ryan Johansen (4th overall)
- 2012: Ryan Murray (2nd overall)
- 2013: Alexander Wennberg (14th overall), Kerby Rychel (19th overall), Marko Daňo (27th overall)
- 2014: Sonny Milano (16th overall)
- 2015: Zach Werenski (8th overall), Gabriel Carlsson (29th overall) (Note: The Blue Jackets acquired the 29th overall pick from the Toronto Maple Leafs for the 34th and 68th picks on June 26, 2015.)
- 2016: Pierre-Luc Dubois (3rd overall)
- 2018: Liam Foudy (18th overall)
- 2020: Egor Chinakhov (21st overall)
- 2021: Kent Johnson (5th overall), Cole Sillinger (12th overall), Corson Ceulemans (25th overall)
- 2022: David Jiříček (6th overall), Denton Mateychuk (12th overall)
- 2023: Adam Fantilli (3rd overall)
- 2024: Cayden Lindstrom (4th overall)
- 2025: Jackson Smith (14th overall), Pyotr Andreyanov (20th overall)
- 2026: Oscar Hemming (14th overall)

== Awards and trophies ==
Maurice "Rocket" Richard Trophy

- Rick Nash: 2003–04 (Note: Shared with Ilya Kovalchuk of the Atlanta Thrashers and Jarome Iginla of the Calgary Flames))

Vezina Trophy

- Sergei Bobrovsky: 2012–13, 2016–17

Calder Memorial Trophy

- Steve Mason: 2008–09

King Clancy Memorial Trophy

- Nick Foligno: 2016–17

Jack Adams Award

- John Tortorella: 2016–17

James Norris Memorial Trophy

- Zach Werenski: 2025-26

Mark Messier Leadership Award

- Nick Foligno: 2016–17

NHL Foundation Player Award

- Rick Nash: 2008–09

Bill Masterton Memorial Trophy

- Sean Monahan: 2024-25

NHL first All-Star team

- Sergei Bobrovsky: 2012–13, 2016–17
- Zach Werenski: 2024–25

NHL second All-Star team

- Steve Mason: 2008–09
- Seth Jones: 2017–18

NHL All-Rookie Team

- Rostislav Klesla: 2001–02
- Rick Nash: 2002–03
- Steve Mason: 2008–09
- Zach Werenski: 2016–17
- Elvis Merzļikins: 2019–20
- Denton Mateychuk: 2024–25

== Records ==
=== Franchise scoring leaders ===
These are the top-ten point-scorers in franchise history as of the 2025–26 season. Figures are updated after each completed NHL regular season.

- * – current Blue Jackets player

Note: Pos = Position; GP = Games played; G = Goals; A = Assists; Pts = Points; P/G = Points per game

Points
Player	Pos	GP	G	A	Pts	P/G
Rick Nash	LW	674	289	258	547	.81
Zach Werenski*	D	642	135	330	465	.72
Boone Jenner	C	808	212	209	421	.52
Cam Atkinson	RW	627	213	189	402	.64
Nick Foligno	LW	599	142	192	334	.56
David Výborný	RW	543	113	204	317	.58
R. J. Umberger	C	445	120	130	250	.56
Oliver Bjorkstrand	RW	382	111	123	234	.61
Brandon Dubinsky	LW	430	72	153	225	.52
Seth Jones	D	381	50	173	223	.59

Goals
Player	Pos	G
Rick Nash	LW	289
Cam Atkinson	RW	213
Boone Jenner	C	212
Nick Foligno	LW	142
Zach Werenski*	D	135
R. J. Umberger	C	120
David Výborný	RW	113
Oliver Bjorkstrand	RW	111
Kirill Marchenko*	RW	102
Geoff Sanderson	LW	88

Assists
Player	Pos	A
Zach Werenski*	D	330
Rick Nash	LW	258
Boone Jenner	C	209
David Výborný	RW	204
Nick Foligno	LW	192
Cam Atkinson	RW	189
Seth Jones	D	173
Alexander Wennberg	C	161
Jakub Voráček	RW	156
Brandon Dubinsky	LW	153

=== Franchise goaltending leaders ===
These goaltenders rank in the top ten in franchise history for wins as of the 2025–26 season. Figures are updated after each completed NHL season.

- * – current Blue Jackets player

Note: GP = Games played; W = Wins; L = Losses; T/O = Ties/Overtime losses; GA = Goal against; GAA = Goals against average; SA = Shots against; SV% = Save percentage; SO = Shutouts

Goaltenders
Player	GP	W	L	T/O	GA	GAA	SA	SV%	SO
Sergei Bobrovsky	374	213	130	27	874	2.41	11,067	.921	33
Elvis Merzļikins*	274	108	111	38	821	3.22	8,188	.900	12
Steve Mason	232	96	99	27	634	2.90	6,553	.903	19
Joonas Korpisalo	210	87	78	24	589	3.06	6,079	.903	3
Marc Denis	266	84	146	25	765	3.01	8,016	.905	12
Pascal Leclaire	125	45	55	12	324	2.82	3,485	.907	10
Jet Greaves*	76	36	28	11	196	2.61	2,254	.913	4
Fredrik Norrena	100	35	45	11	243	2.79	2,409	.899	5
Ron Tugnutt	97	34	52	8	246	2.62	2,723	.910	6
Curtis McElhinney	85	26	33	8	207	2.86	2,267	.909	2

=== Single-season records ===
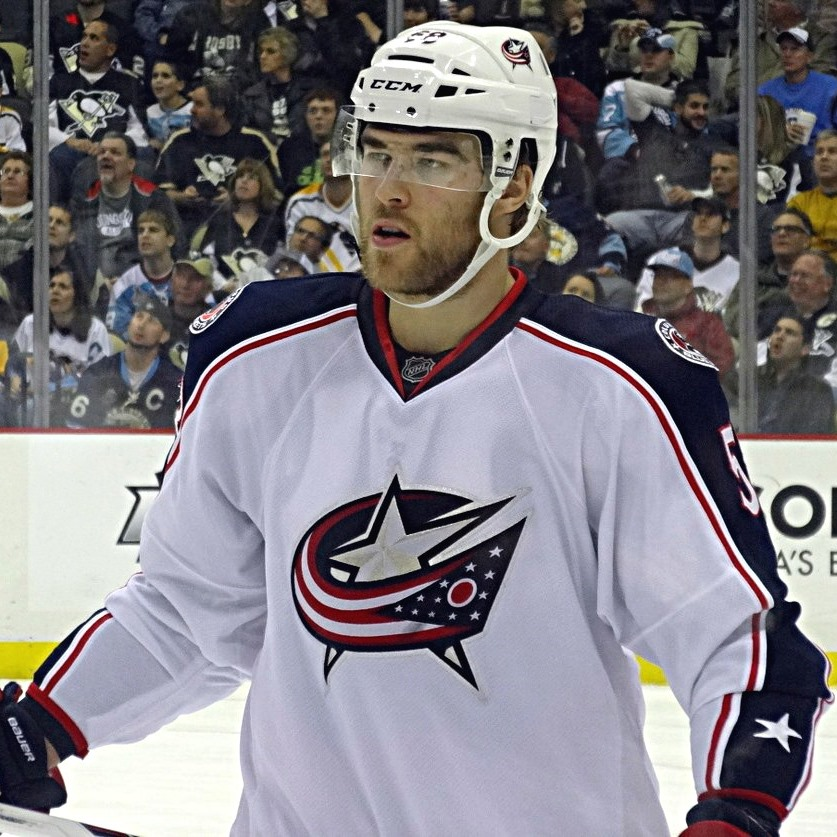
David Savard set the franchise record for highest plus/minus of +33 during the 2016–17 season.

Single-season records include:

- Points: Artemi Panarin (2018–19) – 87
- Goals: Rick Nash (2003–04) and Cam Atkinson (2018–19) – 41
- Assists: Artemi Panarin (2018–19) and Zach Werenski (2024–25) – 59
- Game-winning goals: Cam Atkinson (2016–17) – 9
- Penalty minutes: Jody Shelley (2002–03) – 249
- Plus/Minus: David Savard (2016–17) – +33
- Points by a defenseman: Zach Werenski (2024–25) – 82
- Goals by a defenseman: Zach Werenski (2024–25) – 23
- Assists by a defenseman: Zach Werenski (2024—25)- 59
- Points by a rookie: Pierre-Luc Dubois (2017–18) – 48
- Wins: Sergei Bobrovsky (2016–17) – 41
- Shutouts in a season: Steve Mason (2008–09) – 10
- Goals against average: Sergei Bobrovsky (2012–13) – 2.00
- Save percentage: Sergei Bobrovsky (2012–13) – .932
- Saves: Marc Denis (2002–03) – 2,172
- Longest shutout streak (time without allowing a goal): Steve Mason (2008–09) – 199:19
- Team winning streak – 16 games (November 29, 2016 – January 3, 2017)

== See also ==
- Columbus Chill
- Columbus Owls
- List of Columbus Blue Jackets general managers
- List of Columbus Blue Jackets head coaches
