= Jimmy Clark (footballer, born 1913) =

Scottish footballer

Personal information
- Full name: James McNicholl Cameron Clark
- Date of birth: 11th December 1913
- Place of birth: Cathcart, Renfrewshire, Scotland
- Date of death: unknown
- Place of death: unknown
- Height: 5 ft 10 in (1.78 m)
- Position: Defender

Youth career
- 1932–1934: Clydebank Juniors

Senior career*
Years	Team	Apps	(Gls)
1934–1937	Sunderland	49	(0)
1937–1939	Plymouth Argyle	56	(0)
- * Club domestic league appearances and goals

James McNicholl Cameron Clark (born 11th December 1913, date of death unknown) was a Scottish professional footballer who played as a defender for Sunderland and Plymouth Argyle.
