= Mary Brown's Centre =

Arena and entertainment venue in St. John's, Canada

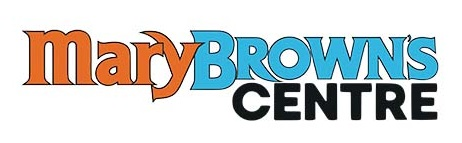

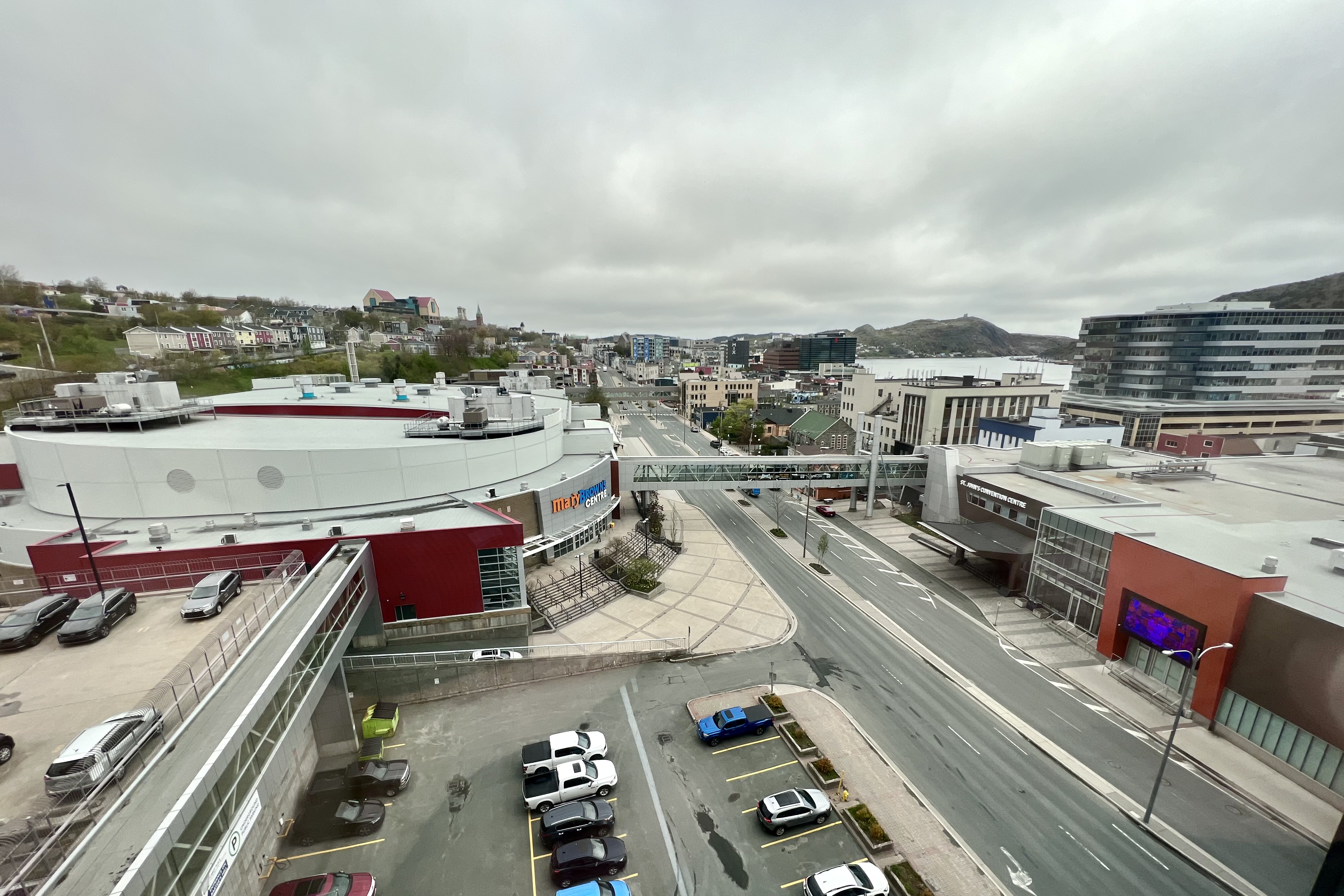

- Location within Newfoundland & Labrador Location within Canada
- Former names: Mile One Centre; Mile One Stadium
- Address: 50 New Gower Street
- Location: St. John's, Newfoundland and Labrador
- Coordinates: 47°33′36.08″N 52°42′47.55″W
- Owner: City of St. John's
- Operator: St. John's Sports and Entertainment
- Capacity: Ice Hockey: 6,287; Basketball: 6,750; Full capacity: 7,000

Construction
- Groundbreaking: October 1998
- Opened: May 24, 2001
- Cost: C$20.5 million ($34.4 million in 2025 dollars)
- Architects: PBK Architects, Inc.
- General contractor: Olympic Construction Ltd.

Tenants
- St. John's Maple Leafs (AHL) (2001–2005); St. John's Fog Devils (QMJHL) (2005–2008); St. John's IceCaps (AHL) (2011–2017); St. John's Edge (NBLC) (2017–2020); Newfoundland Growlers (ECHL) (2018–2024); Newfoundland Rogues (TBL) (2021–present); Newfoundland Regiment (QMJHL) (2025–present)

Mary Brown's Centre (formerly Mile One Centre) is an indoor arena and entertainment venue located in Downtown St. John's, Newfoundland and Labrador, Canada. The arena opened in May, 2001, replacing Memorial Stadium. At full capacity the arena can seat 7,000 people.

The arena is currently home to the Newfoundland Rogues of the TBL and the Newfoundland Regiment of the QMJHL.

== Naming rights ==
During construction, the City of St. John's sold the naming rights to brewing company Molson under a 10-year deal valued at $1.5 million. The agreement would have also included rights to be the venue's exclusive beer supplier. Molson then resold the naming rights to Danny Williams, then-owner of Cable Atlantic, for $600,000. Before the arena opened, however, Williams sold Cable Atlantic to Rogers Communications in order to pursue politics, but retained the naming rights personally. Ultimately Williams chose to name the arena Mile One Stadium, based on St. John's being the easternmost city in Canada.

On October 14, 2021, it was announced that the naming rights to the arena had been bought by the Newfoundland-originated fried chicken restaurant chain Mary Brown's; it was rebranded as Mary Brown's Centre on November 5, 2021.

== Sports ==
=== Hockey ===
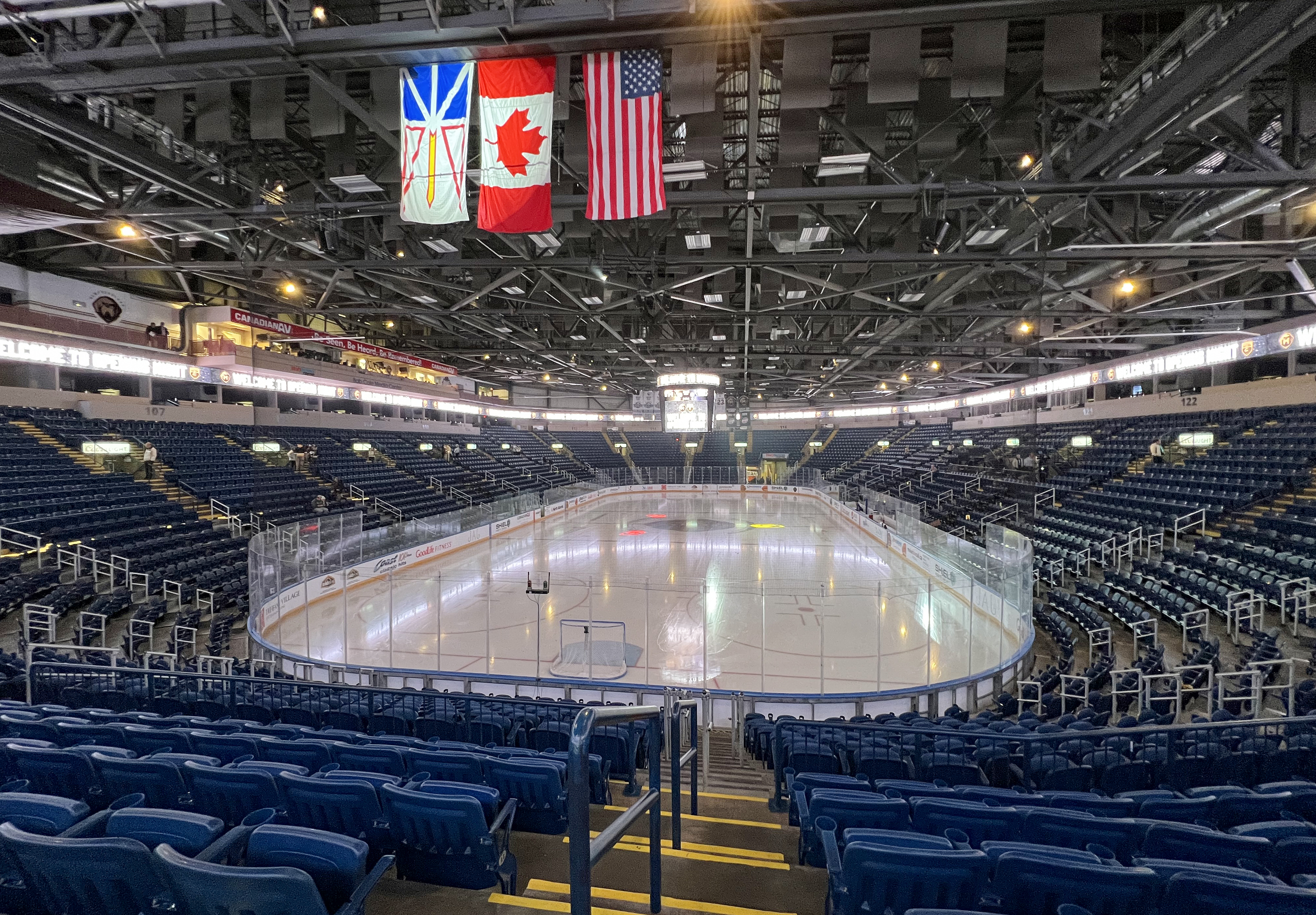
Interior of Mary Brown's Centre

The building was originally home to the St. John's Maple Leafs of the American Hockey League. The Leafs played out of the centre from 2001 to 2005 before relocating to Toronto, Ontario to become the Toronto Marlies. Maple Leaf Sports & Entertainment (MLSE) stated that the relocation was necessary to better monitor prospects for the co-owned Toronto Maple Leafs.

The Dobbin family were granted an expansion Quebec Major Junior Hockey League (QMJHL) franchise in 2004 to be later named the St. John's Fog Devils. The Fog Devils began playing at Mile One Centre in 2005. However, the Fog Devils would relocate to Verdun, Quebec, after three seasons in St. John's to become the Montreal Junior Hockey Club. Many reasons were attributed to the Fog Devils' demise including lack of fan support, a poor lease agreement and high travel costs. The Fog Devils' departure left Mile One Centre without a major tenant for the first time since the building opened.

Professional hockey returned to St. John's in 2011 when Winnipeg-based True North Sports and Entertainment announced a lease agreement with former Newfoundland and Labrador premier Danny Williams that saw their AHL franchise (formerly known as the Manitoba Moose) relocated to the Mile One Centre. The St. John's IceCaps played their inaugural season in 2011–12 and as the minor league affiliate of True North's National Hockey League team, the Winnipeg Jets. In honour of this development, the Kraft Hockeyville pre-season game between the Jets and the Ottawa Senators (which was originally to be held in Conception Bay when announced as it was prior to the relocation of the Atlanta Thrashers to become the Jets, causing the Moose to become the IceCaps) was moved to the Mile One Centre. In March 2015, it was announced that the Jets would move their AHL team from St. John's back to Winnipeg as the Moose in 2015–16. The IceCaps' organization was then able to get the Montreal Canadiens' AHL team, the Hamilton Bulldogs, to relocate to St. John's for the start of the 2015–16 season, retaining the IceCaps name. However, this was only a temporary move while the Canadiens built a rink for their AHL team in Laval, Quebec. In 2017, the Canadiens-owned franchise left and became the Laval Rocket.

In 2018, after a year without a hockey tenant at Mile One, St. John's was granted an ECHL expansion team with the Newfoundland Growlers. The Growlers won the Kelly Cup championship in their inaugural season. On October 27, 2021, the Growlers were evicted from the arena citing workplace misconduct by the ownership of the team, Deacon Sports and Entertainment (DSE), and the Growlers had to play their first six home games of the 2021–22 season in nearby Conception Bay South. The city and DSE came to an agreement for the team to return in November 2021. The Growlers ceased operations on April 2, 2024, due to failing to fulfill the ECHL's league bylaws as well as financial reasons, leaving the arena again without a hockey tenant.

In 2024, the QMJHL announced that the Acadie–Bathurst Titan would relocate to St. John's for the 2025–26 season.

=== Basketball ===
After long negotiations, the arena became the home to the St. John's Edge of the National Basketball League of Canada beginning with the 2017–18 season bringing professional basketball to St. John's. On July 15, 2021, the St. John's Edge were removed from Mile One when the city did not renew the lease with the team to play in the arena, opting to grant a lease to a different ownership group with an American Basketball Association franchise.

=== Other sporting events ===
The arena hosts the annual Herder Memorial Trophy tournament, the largest hockey tournament in the province. It hosted the 2002 AHL All-Star Game and the 2014 AHL All-Star Game in which the AHL All-Stars faced Färjestad BK of the Swedish Hockey League.

On September 22, 2014, Mile One Centre held two split squad preseason games for the Ottawa Senators vs. the New York Islanders. New York won both games 3–2, the latter game on a shootout. The Senators faced the Carolina Hurricanes at Mile One for another preseason game on September 27, 2015.

In October 2003, the arena was to host an NBA pre-season game between the Toronto Raptors and Cleveland Cavaliers, with lineups featuring NBA All-Star Vince Carter and an 18 year old rookie making his NBA debut by the name of LeBron James. Both teams suited up and took pre-game warm-ups, but an unseasonably warm day in St. John's led to excess condensation inside the arena and pooling of moisture on the court, leading Raptors General Manager Glen Grunwald to take a microphone to centre court and announce the game would be cancelled in front of a sold-out crowd.

Other hosted sporting events include:

- 2004 World U-17 Hockey Challenge
- 2005 Skate Canada International
- 2005 Scott Tournament of Hearts
- 2008 5th World Junior Street & Ball Hockey Championship
- During the 2010-2011 hockey season, Hockey Canada used the arena as host venue for the Four Nations Cup and the Telus Cup.

The arena hosted the 2017 Tim Hortons Brier and 2026 Montana's Brier, the Canadian men's curling championship.

== Other events ==
The 2002 Juno Awards were presented at Mary Brown's Centre on April 14, 2002, marking the first time the presentation had been hosted outside of Ontario or British Columbia. The arena subsequently hosted the 2010 Juno Awards.

Mary Brown's Centre was the main venue for the third annual Avalon Expo sci-fi/comics/pop-culture convention on August 25–27, 2017.

The first musical act to play at Mile One Centre was Live in 2001. Over the years the venue has hosted many concerts, including: Nickelback, Alanis Morissette, The Tragically Hip, B. B. King, Our Lady Peace, Joe Cocker, Backstreet Boys, Bryan Adams, Barenaked Ladies, Blue Rodeo, Gordon Lightfoot, Billy Idol, Billy Talent, Simple Plan, Elton John, Feist, Neil Young, Snoop Dogg, Ludacris, Pearl Jam, Bachman & Turner, Celtic Thunder, Leonard Cohen, Journey, Sting, Tegan and Sara, Sarah McLachlan, Carly Rae Jepsen, Hedley, Bob Dylan, KISS, Jackson Browne, James Taylor, and Hilary Duff.

Preceded by Memorial Stadium	Home of the St. John's Maple Leafs; 2001–2005	Succeeded by Ricoh Coliseum (as Toronto Marlies)
Preceded by	Home of the St. John's Fog Devils; 2005–2008	Succeeded by Verdun Auditorium (as Montreal Junior Hockey Club)
Preceded by MTS Centre (as Manitoba Moose)	Home of the St. John's IceCaps; 2011–2016	Succeeded by Place Bell (as Laval Rocket)
Preceded by	Home of the Newfoundland Growlers; 2018–2024	Succeeded by
Preceded by K. C. Irving Regional Centre (as Acadie–Bathurst Titan)	Home of the Newfoundland Regiment; 2025	Succeeded by
