= Junior de Montréal =

Junior de Montréal may refer to one of the following hockey teams:

- Montreal Junior Hockey Club, a Major junior team 2008–2011
- Montreal Juniors, a Major junior team 1975–1982
- Montreal Juniors (LHJQ), a defunct AAA junior team
