= Luke Adam =

Canadian ice hockey player (born 1990)

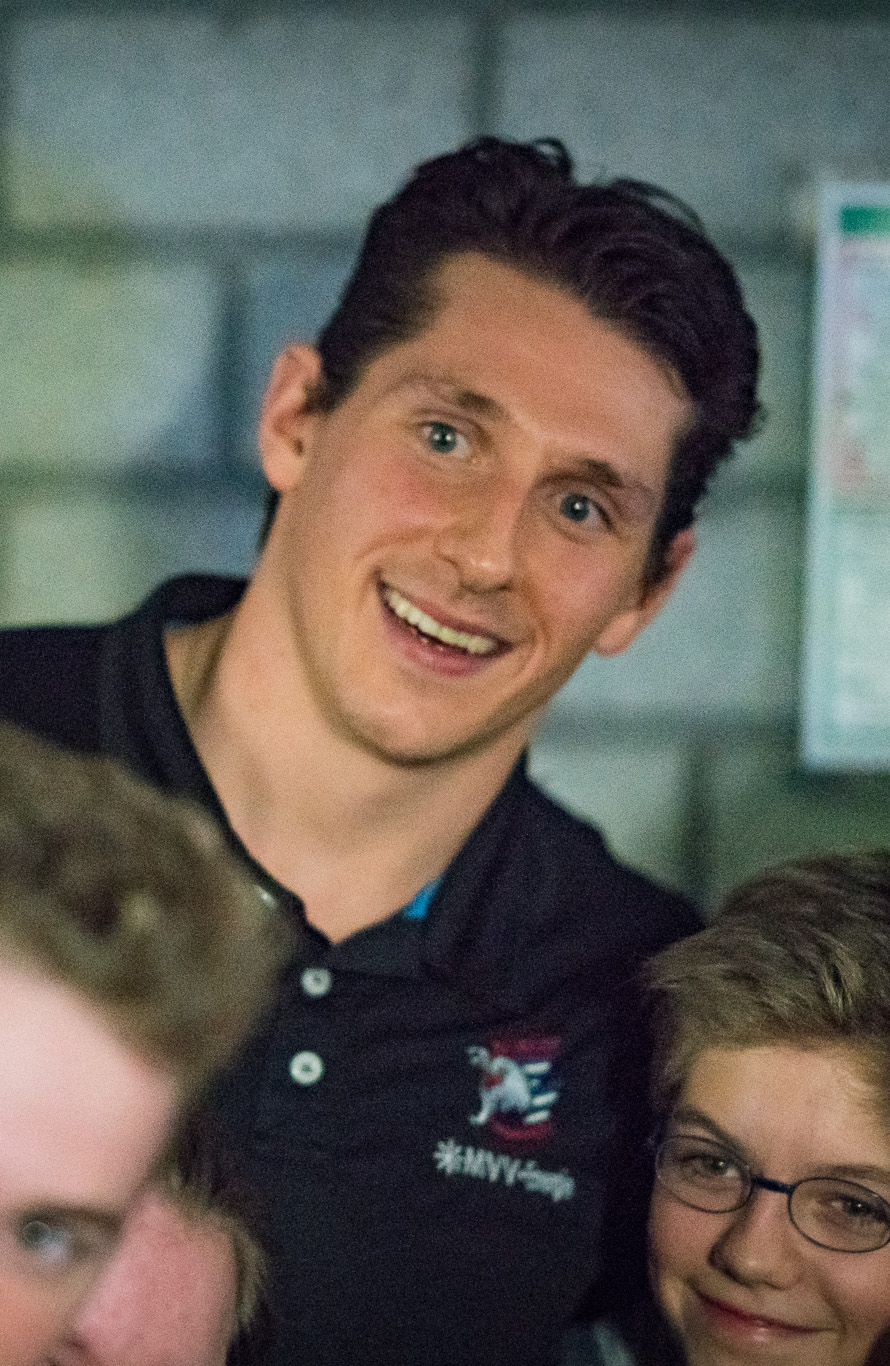
- Adam in 2017
- Born: June 18, 1990 (age 36) St. John's, Newfoundland, Canada
- Height: 6 ft 2 in (188 cm)
- Weight: 207 lb (94 kg; 14 st 11 lb)
- Position: Centre
- Shot: Left
- Played for: Buffalo Sabres; Columbus Blue Jackets; Adler Mannheim; Düsseldorfer EG; Nürnberg Ice Tigers; Iserlohn Roosters; Straubing Tigers; HC Plzeň; HC '05 Banská Bystrica; Tahoe Knight Monsters
- NHL draft: 44th overall, 2008; Buffalo Sabres
- Playing career: 2010–2026

Luke Adam (born June 18, 1990) is a Canadian former professional ice hockey centre. He previously played in the National Hockey League (NHL) for the Buffalo Sabres and Columbus Blue Jackets. Adam was drafted by Buffalo in the second round, 44th overall, in the 2008 NHL entry draft.

== Playing career ==
Adam began his major junior hockey career with the St. John's Fog Devils of the Quebec Major Junior Hockey League (QMJHL). He played there for two seasons before being drafted by the Buffalo Sabres in the 2008 NHL entry draft. The Fog Devils moved to Montreal to become the Montreal Juniors before the 2008–09 season. Adam played there before being traded to the Cape Breton Screaming Eagles. Adam was selected to play for Canada at the 2010 World Junior Ice Hockey Championships in Saskatoon, Saskatchewan.

On October 26, 2010, Adam made his NHL debut in an away game against the Philadelphia Flyers in a 6–3 Sabres loss. On December 7, 2010, Adam recorded his first NHL goal in an away game against the Boston Bruins.

Adam was tied for the most goals in the American Hockey League (AHL) for the Rochester Americans when he was recalled by the Sabres on November 19, 2013. He competed for Rochester in the 2013 Spengler Cup, scoring two goals and two assists.

On December 16, 2014, Adam was traded to the Columbus Blue Jackets in exchange for Jerry D'Amigo.

On July 3, 2015, Adam signed a one-year, two-way contract as a free agent with the New York Rangers. After attending the Rangers' 2015 training camp, he was reassigned for the duration of the 2015–16 season to the club's AHL affiliate, the Hartford Wolf Pack. In 59 games with Hartford, he scored 12 goals and 29 points.

In October 2016, Adam signed with Adler Mannheim of the Deutsche Eishockey Liga (DEL) in Germany.

Following the 2018–19 season, helping Adler Mannheim claim the DEL championship, Adam left as a free agent after three seasons and agreed to a two-year contract with Düsseldorfer EG on May 3, 2019. In the 2019–20 season, Adam contributed with 14 goals and 30 points through 48 regular season games for DEG before the season was cancelled due to the COVID-19 pandemic.

After just one season in Düsseldorf, Adam opted to leave the club and signed a one-year deal with his third DEL club, the Nürnberg Ice Tigers, on November 20, 2020.

On July 2, 2022, Adam as a free agent continued his tenure in Germany after he was signed to a one-year contract with Straubing Tigers for the 2022–23 season.

On September 18, 2024, Adam signed with the Tahoe Knight Monsters of the ECHL for the 2024–25 season Inaugural Season.

On June 16, 2026, Adam announced his retirement from professional hockey in a post on X.

== Personal life ==
Adam's father, Russ, played eight games in the NHL for the Toronto Maple Leafs in the 1982–83 season.

== Career statistics ==
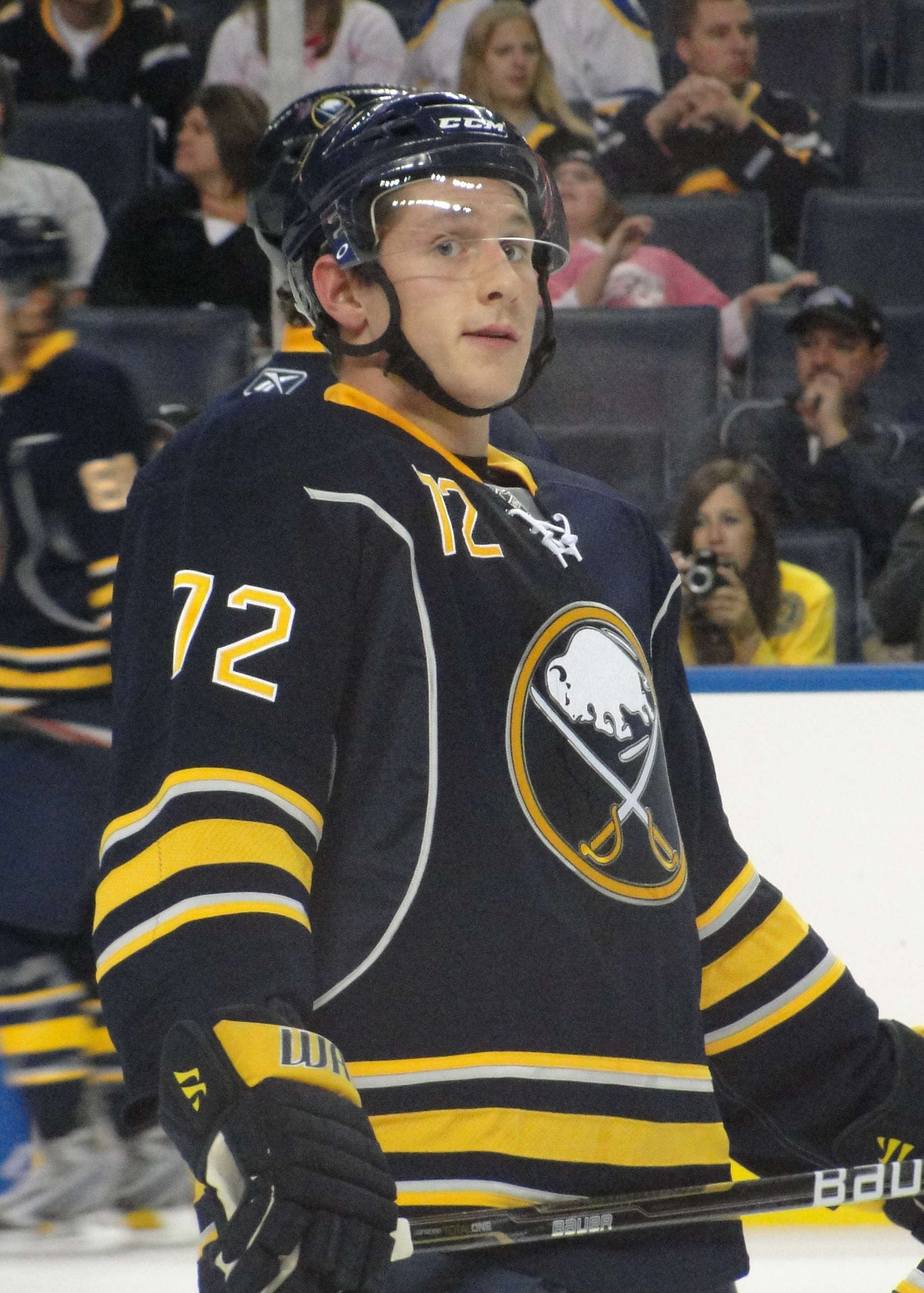
Adam with the Buffalo Sabres in 2010

=== Regular season and playoffs ===
			Regular season					Playoffs
Season	Team	League	GP	G	A	Pts	PIM	GP	G	A	Pts	PIM
2006–07	St. John's Fog Devils	QMJHL	63	6	9	15	51	4	0	2	2	4
2007–08	St. John's Fog Devils	QMJHL	70	36	30	66	72	6	3	5	8	8
2008–09	Montreal Junior Hockey Club	QMJHL	47	22	27	49	59	—	—	—	—	—
2009–10	Cape Breton Screaming Eagles	QMJHL	56	49	41	90	75	5	3	1	4	2
2009–10	Portland Pirates	AHL	—	—	—	—	—	3	0	2	2	0
2010–11	Portland Pirates	AHL	57	29	33	62	46	12	4	3	7	14
2010–11	Buffalo Sabres	NHL	19	3	1	4	12	—	—	—	—	—
2011–12	Rochester Americans	AHL	27	4	9	13	18	3	0	1	1	4
2011–12	Buffalo Sabres	NHL	52	10	10	20	14	—	—	—	—	—
2012–13	Rochester Americans	AHL	67	15	22	37	57	1	0	0	0	0
2012–13	Buffalo Sabres	NHL	4	1	0	1	2	—	—	—	—	—
2013–14	Rochester Americans	AHL	59	29	20	49	48	5	2	2	4	4
2013–14	Buffalo Sabres	NHL	12	1	0	1	4	—	—	—	—	—
2014–15	Rochester Americans	AHL	27	8	12	20	24	—	—	—	—	—
2014–15	Springfield Falcons	AHL	46	8	14	22	38	—	—	—	—	—
2014–15	Columbus Blue Jackets	NHL	3	0	0	0	4	—	—	—	—	—
2015–16	Hartford Wolf Pack	AHL	59	12	17	29	30	—	—	—	—	—
2016–17	Adler Mannheim	DEL	38	15	20	35	22	7	3	3	6	4
2017–18	Adler Mannheim	DEL	52	10	23	33	38	10	3	4	7	4
2018–19	Adler Mannheim	DEL	50	16	22	38	24	14	5	8	13	10
2019–20	Düsseldorfer EG	DEL	48	14	16	30	36	—	—	—	—	—
2020–21	Nürnberg Ice Tigers	DEL	32	8	23	31	28	—	—	—	—	—
2021–22	Iserlohn Roosters	DEL	43	9	21	30	30	—	—	—	—	—
2022–23	Straubing Tigers	DEL	54	17	19	36	26	7	1	2	3	8
2023–24	HC Plzeň	ELH	7	0	2	2	2	—	—	—	—	—
2023–24	HC '05 Banská Bystrica	Slovak	21	5	8	13	14	—	—	—	—	—
2024–25	Tahoe Knight Monsters	ECHL	70	17	22	39	34	8	1	2	3	0
NHL totals			90	15	11	26	36	—	—	—	—	—
DEL totals			317	89	144	233	204	38	12	17	29	26

=== International ===
Year	Team	Event	Result	GP	G	A	Pts	PIM
2006	Canada Atlantic	U17	6th	5	0	1	1	2
2010	Canada	WJC	2nd place, silver medalist(s)	6	4	4	8	8
Junior totals				11	4	5	9	10

== Awards and honours ==
Award	Year
QMJHL
First All-Star Team	2010
AHL
All-Star Game	2011
All-Rookie Team	2011
Dudley "Red" Garrett Memorial Award	2011
DEL
Champion (Adler Mannheim)	2019

Awards
Preceded by Tyler Ennis	AHL Rookie of the Year; 2010–11	Succeeded by Cory Conacher
