= Mario Kempe =

Swedish ice hockey player (born 1988)

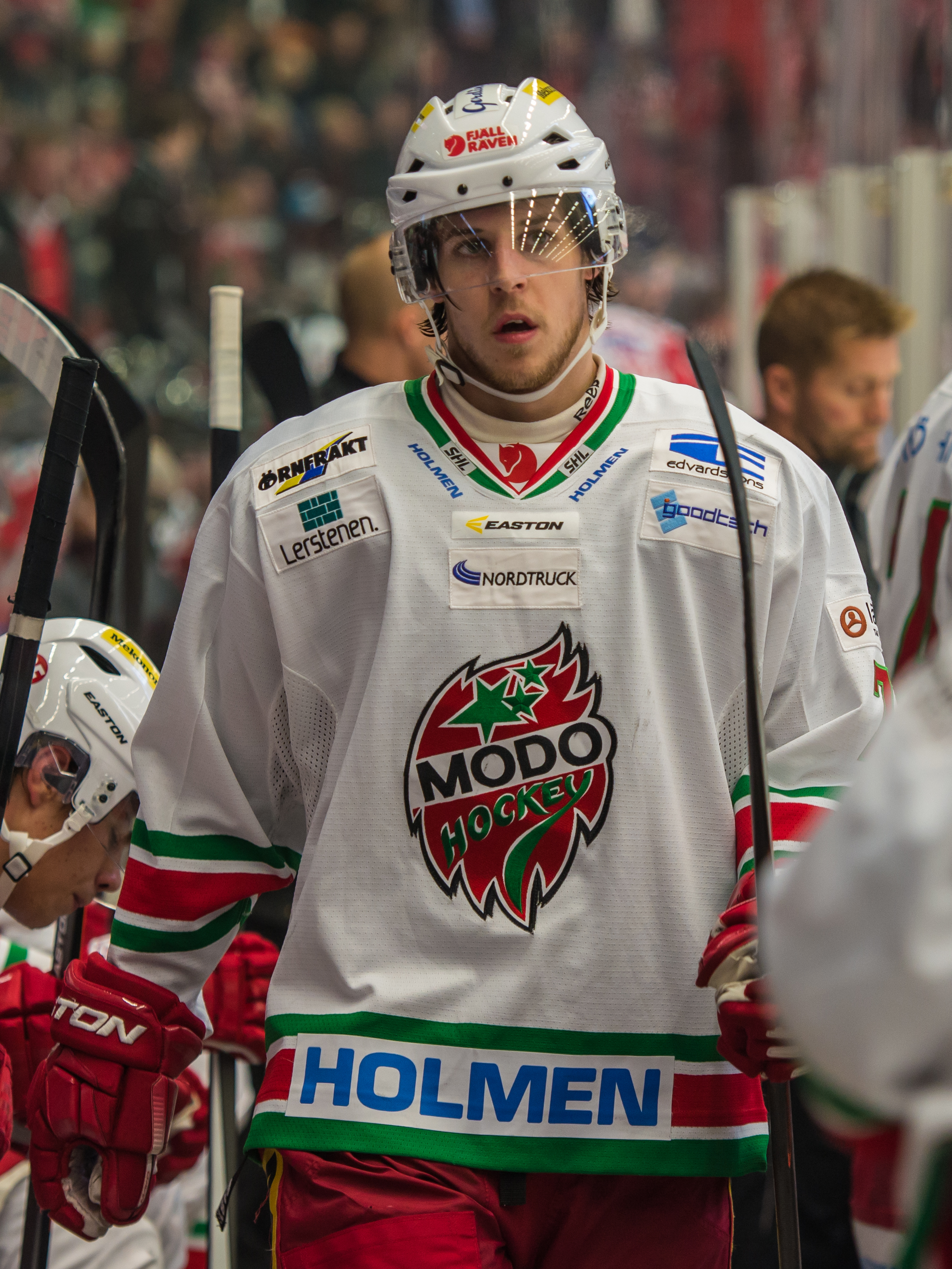
- Kempe with Modo Hockey in October 2013
- Born: 19 September 1988 (age 38) Kramfors, Sweden
- Height: 6 ft 0 in (183 cm)
- Weight: 185 lb (84 kg; 13 st 3 lb)
- Position: Right wing
- Shot: Left
- Played for: Rögle BK; Djurgårdens IF; Modo; Vityaz; Arizona Coyotes; CSKA Moscow; Dinamo Minsk; Luleå HF; HC Lugano
- National team: Sweden
- NHL draft: 122nd overall, 2007; Philadelphia Flyers
- Playing career: 2008–2026

Mario Kempe (born 19 September 1988) is a Swedish former professional ice hockey right winger. He spent most of his career in the Swedish Hockey League (SHL) and Kontinental Hockey League (KHL), but also formerly played in the National Hockey League (NHL) for the Arizona Coyotes.

== Playing career ==
Kempe first started skating when he was five years old on an outdoor rink in his hometown of Kramfors. He represented Ångermanland twice in TV-pucken while playing for Modo Hockey's junior teams in Örnsköldsvik, Sweden. During the 2005–06 season, Kempe represented Team Sweden at the 2006 IIHF Under-18 World Championship.

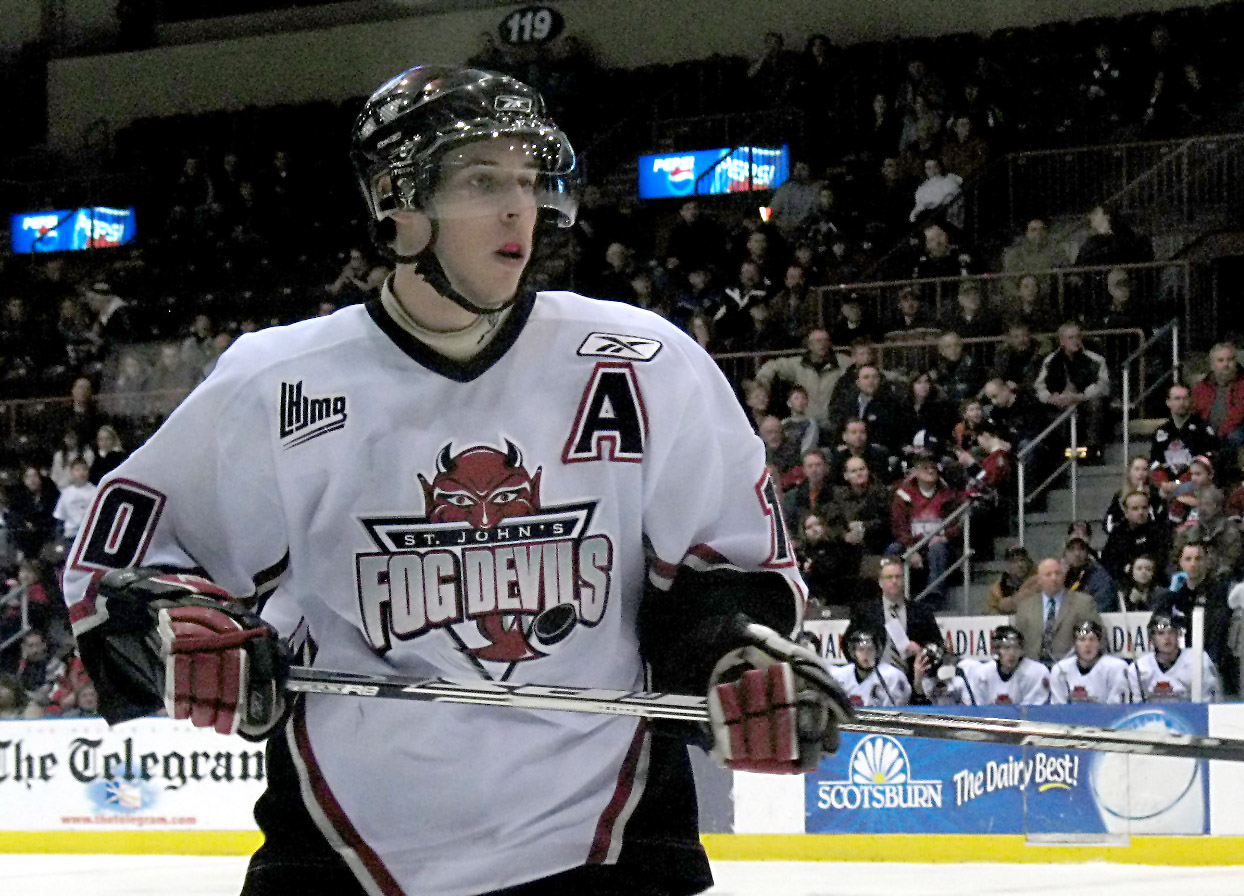
Kempe with the St. John's Fog Devils

That following summer, Kempe was drafted 31st overall in the 2006 CHL Import Draft by the St. John's Fog Devils of the QMJHL. Kempe made the trip to North America and cracked the Fog Devils lineup. He was named an assistant captain during his rookie season.

Kempe finished the season tied for 6th among QMJHL rookies in goals and 11th in points, and was voted "Fastest Skater in the Eastern Division". Kempe was ranked 50th among North American prospects on Central Scouting's final report heading into the 2007 NHL entry draft. He was chosen in the 5th round, 122nd overall by the Philadelphia Flyers.

Kempe returned to his native Sweden after completing two seasons in the QMJHL. He signed with Rögle BK of Elitserien in the off-season and recorded two goals and eight assists in thirty games-played. After receiving limited ice time during the first half of the year he was traded to Mora IK of the second-highest level league in Sweden. He signed a two-year contract with Djurgården on 16 June 2010.

Following the 2016–17 campaign and after three seasons in the Kontinental Hockey League with Vityaz, Kempe left as a free agent and returned to North America in securing a one-year, two-way contract with the Arizona Coyotes of the National Hockey League (NHL) on 16 May 2017. On 28 May 2018, he signed a one-year contract extension with the Coyotes.

On 5 July 2019, Kempe signed a one-year two-way contract with the Los Angeles Kings, joining brother Adrian. He was assigned to the Ontario Reign for the beginning of the 2019–20 season. Named as an alternate captain for the Reign, Kempe registered 3 goals and 11 points through 16 games in the AHL before he was placed on unconditional waivers by the Kings in order for a mutual termination of his contract on 19 November 2019.

As a free agent, Kempe returned for a second stint in Russia and the KHL, agreeing to a two-year contract with reigning Gagarin Cup champions CSKA Moscow on 21 November 2019.

At the conclusion of his contract with CSKA, Kempe left the club and continued in the KHL with Belarusian outfit, Dinamo Minsk, on a one-year contract on 26 August 2021.

On 29 November 2022, Kempe signed a two-year contract with Luleå HF of the SHL. His 2022–23 season ended in February 2023 due to a fractured kneecap, which required surgery.

== International play ==
On 9 May 2019, Kempe was named to make his senior international debut with Sweden at the 2019 World Championships held in Bratislava, Slovakia.

== Personal life ==
Kempe's younger brother, Adrian, plays for the Los Angeles Kings of the NHL. Mario is named after Mario Kempes who is the Argentine former professional footballer.

== Career statistics ==
=== Regular season and playoffs ===
			Regular season					Playoffs
Season	Team	League	GP	G	A	Pts	PIM	GP	G	A	Pts	PIM
2004–05	Modo Hockey	J18 Allsv	14	5	7	12	40	4	1	1	2	4
2005–06	Modo Hockey	J18 Allsv	6	4	2	6	29	2	0	2	2	0
2005–06	Modo Hockey	J20	36	20	12	32	26	2	0	0	0	0
2006–07	St. John's Fog Devils	QMJHL	62	23	19	42	51	4	0	0	0	2
2007–08	St. John's Fog Devils	QMJHL	48	25	24	49	36	6	4	3	7	8
2008–09	Rögle BK	J20	1	0	0	0	2	—	—	—	—	—
2008–09	Rögle BK	SEL	30	2	8	10	8	—	—	—	—	—
2008–09	Mora IK	Allsv	17	9	3	12	6	3	0	0	0	2
2008–09	Philadelphia Phantoms	AHL	5	0	0	0	2	3	0	0	0	2
2009–10	Rögle BK	SEL	51	7	11	18	14	—	—	—	—	—
2010–11	Djurgårdens IF	SEL	54	10	7	17	6	7	0	0	0	0
2011–12	Djurgårdens IF	SEL	52	8	7	15	14	—	—	—	—	—
2012–13	Modo Hockey	SEL	53	15	12	27	12	5	0	0	0	0
2013–14	Modo Hockey	SHL	54	9	8	17	18	2	0	0	0	0
2014–15	Vityaz Podolsk	KHL	54	13	19	32	52	—	—	—	—	—
2015–16	Vityaz Podolsk	KHL	56	12	5	17	64	—	—	—	—	—
2016–17	Vityaz Podolsk	KHL	56	14	20	34	28	4	0	1	1	0
2017–18	Tucson Roadrunners	AHL	47	18	19	37	22	9	4	3	7	6
2017–18	Arizona Coyotes	NHL	18	2	2	4	4	—	—	—	—	—
2018–19	Arizona Coyotes	NHL	52	4	5	9	18	—	—	—	—	—
2018–19	Tucson Roadrunners	AHL	10	5	6	11	8	—	—	—	—	—
2019–20	Ontario Reign	AHL	16	3	8	11	8	—	—	—	—	—
2019–20	CSKA Moscow	KHL	28	5	15	20	6	4	1	0	1	6
2020–21	CSKA Moscow	KHL	34	11	11	22	20	12	0	0	0	31
2021–22	Dinamo Minsk	KHL	31	6	11	17	12	—	—	—	—	—
2022–23	Luleå HF	SHL	12	0	3	3	2	—	—	—	—	—
2023–24	Luleå HF	SHL	22	5	3	8	12	—	—	—	—	—
2023–24	HC Lugano	NL	9	1	0	1	4	4	1	0	1	2
2024–25	Tappara	Liiga	30	5	6	11	6	9	2	1	3	2
2025–26	EC KAC	ICEHL	43	10	20	30	2	3	0	2	2	0
SHL totals			328	56	59	115	86	14	0	0	0	0
KHL totals			259	61	81	142	182	20	1	1	2	37
NHL totals			70	6	7	13	22	—	—	—	—	—

=== International ===
Year	Team	Event	Result	GP	G	A	Pts	PIM
2006	Sweden	WJC18	6th	5	0	1	1	27
2008	Sweden	WJC	2nd place, silver medalist(s)	6	0	0	0	2
2019	Sweden	WC	5th	4	1	1	2	2
2021	Sweden	WC	9th	7	2	0	2	0
Junior totals				11	0	1	1	29
Senior totals				11	3	1	4	2
