= Réal Paiement =

Canadian hockey coach (born 1959)

- Born: September 30, 1959 (age 65); Dollard-des-Ormeaux, Quebec, Canada
- Height: 5 ft 8 in (173 cm)
- Weight: 181 lb (82 kg; 12 st 13 lb)
- Position: Defence
- Shot: Right
- Played for: Flint Generals; Milwaukee Admirals
- Playing career: 1979–1983

Réal Paiement (born September 30, 1959) is a Canadian ice hockey coach and former player. He coached the Acadie-Bathurst Titan of the Quebec Major Junior Hockey League (QMJHL) after spending over two years coaching professional hockey in Europe. His last stint in the QMJHL was serving as head coach and general manager of the St. John's Fog Devils in 2007-2008. He proceeded to coach in The Swiss League, the second tier professional ice hockey league in Switzerland, from 2008-2011 before becoming head coach of the University of Ottawa Men’s Hockey Club from 2011-2014. Paiement was dismissed as head coach by the University of Ottawa in 2014 following an investigation into an alleged sexual assault involving players on the team.

He was an ice hockey player for several major junior teams from 1975 until 1982, then played in the International Hockey League (IHL) and in France before returning to Canada to play at McGill University.

Paiement currently serves as Amateur Scout for the Toronto Maple Leafs of the National Hockey League.

== Hockey career ==
=== Player ===
Paiement was a defenceman in the QMJHL for several years. He was drafted by the Montreal Junior Canadiens in 1975. He played with the Jr. Canadiens until he was traded in the middle of the 1978–79 season to the Flint Generals of the IHL. He played no regular season games with the Generals, but played in six playoff games where he scored one goal.

The Generals then traded Paiement to the Milwaukee Admirals where he played until the end of the 1981–82 season and then suited up for the McGill University Redmen, where he played for head coach Ken Tyler from 1983 to 1985.

== Career statistics ==
Team	League	GP	G	A	Pts	PIM
Montreal Jr. Canadiens	QMJHL	60	3	18	21	58
Montreal Jr. Canadiens	QMJHL	72	6	22	28	64
Montreal Jr. Canadiens	QMJHL	72	10	45	55	68
Montreal Jr. Canadiens	QMJHL	72	8	42	50	85
Flint Generals	IHL	0	0	0	0	0
Milwaukee Admirals	IHL	74	6	34	40	46
Milwaukee Admirals	IHL	73	4	26	30	74
Milwaukee Admirals	IHL	81	10	47	57	57
S.E.P.F Dunkirk	France	na	na	na	na	na
McGill Redmen	CIAU	20	2	12	14	48
McGill Redmen	CIAU	22	1	17	18	26

=== Coach ===
Paiement began his coaching career in 1985 as an assistant coach with the McGill University Redmen. In 1986-87, he was named head coach of the QMJHL's Granby Bisons, which was his most successful season as a coach, winning 48 of the 70 regular season games. During his final year in Granby, half of the season was coached by John Paris. Paiement coached the Bisons for four seasons before spending two years coaching the Chicoutimi Saguenéens. Next, from the 2001–02 season until the 2003–04 season, Paiement was head coach of the Acadie-Bathurst Titan. In 2005, he was named head coach and general manager of the St. John's Fog Devils and on October 5, 2007, Paiement broke the record for most QMJHL games as head coach as he coached his 989th game. On May 25, 2008, he sign a one-year contract to coach HC Ajoie in Switzerland. In April 2010 he announced his departure from Ajoie at the end of the 2009-10 season for HC Viège. Following a short stay with EHC Visp, he re-signed with the Titan and returned to Canada.
