= T. J. Brennan =

American ice hockey player (born 1989)

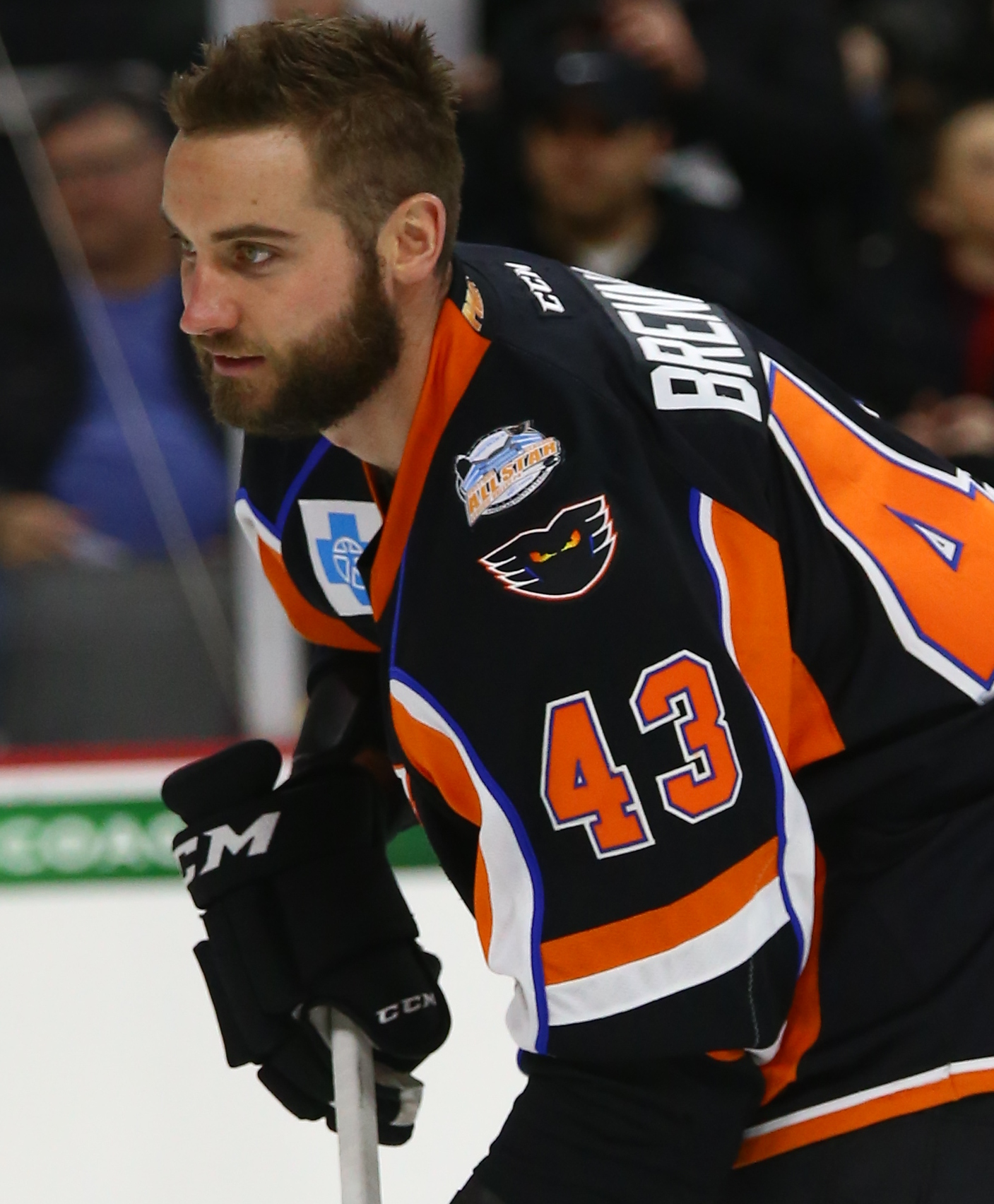
- Brennan at the 2019 AHL All-Star Game
- Born: April 3, 1989 (age 37) Willingboro Township, New Jersey, U.S.
- Height: 6 ft 1 in (185 cm)
- Weight: 216 lb (98 kg; 15 st 6 lb)
- Position: Defense
- Shoots: Left
- ICEHL team Former teams: HK Olimpija; Buffalo Sabres; Florida Panthers; Toronto Maple Leafs; EC Red Bull Salzburg; HC Ajoie
- NHL draft: 31st overall, 2007; Buffalo Sabres
- Playing career: 2009–present

Terrence James Brennan (born April 3, 1989) is an American professional ice hockey defenseman who is currently playing for HK Olimpija of the ICE Hockey League (ICEHL). Brennan was originally selected by the Buffalo Sabres in the second round, 31st overall, of the 2007 NHL entry draft, and has also previously played for the Florida Panthers and Toronto Maple Leafs at the NHL level. Brennan has been cited as an elite offensive AHL defenseman, scoring at a pace of nearly a point-per-game, a rare feat for a defender.

== Playing career ==
=== Amateur ===
Brennan is from Willingboro Township, New Jersey and grew up in Moorestown, New Jersey. He left Moorestown High School during his senior year to begin his career as a hockey player, later playing two seasons with the now-defunct St. John's Fog Devils of the Quebec Major Junior Hockey League (QMJHL) before moving with the team to Montreal, when it became the Montreal Junior Hockey Club. During the 2006–07 season, Brennan scored 16 goals and 25 assists in 68 games, winning the Raymond Lagacé Trophy as the QMJHL defensive rookie of the year.

=== Professional ===
Brennan was slotted as the 29th best prospect by the National Hockey League's Central Scouting in advance of the 2009 NHL entry draft. Brennan was described by Central Scouting as a good playmaker with a hard shot. He was selected by the Buffalo Sabres in the 2nd round, 31st overall in the draft. On April 18, 2009, Brennan signed a three-year, entry-level contract with the Sabres that began in the 2009–10 season. Brennan spent two seasons with the Sabres' American Hockey League (AHL) affiliate, the Portland Pirates. On November 23, 2011, Brennan made his NHL debut for the Sabres, also scoring his first career NHL goal against goaltender Tim Thomas of the Boston Bruins. He was returned to the AHL and played his third season with the Sabres' new AHL affiliate, the Rochester Americans. On March 15, 2013, Brennan was traded to the Florida Panthers in exchange for a fifth-round pick in the 2013 NHL entry draft. He played in 21 games total with the Sabres, registering two goals.

Brennan finished the season with the Panthers, playing in 19 games scoring 2 goals and 9 points. That offseason, on June 14, 2013, he was traded from the Panthers to the Nashville Predators in exchange for Bobby Butler. Brennan was not qualified by the Predators, however, and was released as an unrestricted free agent on July 1. On July 5, he then signed a one-year, two-way contract with the Toronto Maple Leafs worth $600,000. He was invited to the Maple Leafs training camp, but was cut and sent to Toronto's AHL affiliate, the Toronto Marlies after passing through waivers. He had an excellent season, winning the Eddie Shore Award as the AHL's most outstanding defenseman and played in the AHL's 2014 All-Star Game.

On July 4, 2014, Brennan buoyed by his successful season with the Marlies signed as an unrestricted free agent on a one-year NHL contract with the New York Islanders. However, after partaking in the Islanders' 2014 training camp, on October 4, Brennan was traded prior to the 2014–15 season, along with Ville Pokka and Anders Nilsson, to the Chicago Blackhawks in exchange for defenseman Nick Leddy in a cost-cutting move by the Blackhawks. Brennan was assigned to the Rockford IceHogs, the Blackhawks' AHL affiliate, after clearing waivers. He played in 54 games with the IceHogs before he was traded at the NHL trade deadline on February 26, 2015, to the Toronto Maple Leafs in exchange for Spencer Abbott. He was then reassigned for a second stint with the Marlies. During this season, he would also make his first appearance for the Maple Leafs, playing in 6 games for the club. Brennan was re-signed to a one-year contract following the seasons completion.

The following year, Brennan was a staple defenseman on the league leading Marlies, remaining at a point a game throughout the season and recording the second most points in the AHL. Brennan was called up to play in one game on March 9, 2016, due to an injury to the previous callup Victor Loov, who was injured in practice before playing a game. However, a few weeks later, on March 31, with few games remaining in the season, Brennan was one of four players called up to the Maple Leafs. On April 4, Brennan scored his first goal in the NHL in nearly 3 years, potting one in a 4–3 defeat of the Florida Panthers. Coincidentally, Brennan's last goal was on April 11, 2013, while playing for the Panthers. He finished the season with 25 goals and 68 points with the Marlies and 1 goal in 7 games with the Maple Leafs. For his stellar play with the Marlies, he won his second Eddie Shore Award as the AHL's best defenseman.

On July 5, 2016, Brennan signed a two-year contract with his hometown Philadelphia Flyers. During his fourth year within the Flyers organization with the Lehigh Valley Phantoms in the 2019–20 season, Brennan was unable to match his previous career scoring output, recording just 8 points through 28 games, before suffering an injury. On February 24, 2020, Brennan was traded at the NHL trade deadline by the Flyers to the Chicago Blackhawks in exchange for Nathan Noel. He was immediately assigned to join the Rockford IceHogs of the AHL.

On December 28, 2020, Brennan was an un-signed free agent and opted to sign abroad, agreeing to a contract for the remainder of the 2020–21 season with Swiss second-tier club, HC Thurgau of the Swiss League. He had 10 goals and 24 points for HC Thurgau. On June 18, 2021, Brennan signed with EC Red Bull Salzburg of the ICE Hockey League. With Salzburg, Brennan won the league championship, scoring 27 goals and 59 points in 60 games (playoffs included). He left the team in June 2022. On June 15, Brennan signed with HC Ajoie of the National League.

Following three seasons in Switzerland with HC Ajoie, Brennan left the club and returned to the ICE Hockey League, after securing a one-year deal with Slovenian club, HK Olimpija, on July 21, 2025.

== Career statistics ==
			Regular season					Playoffs
Season	Team	League	GP	G	A	Pts	PIM	GP	G	A	Pts	PIM
2005–06	Philadelphia Jr. Flyers	AtJHL	42	9	23	32	84	—	—	—	—	—
2006–07	St. John's Fog Devils	QMJHL	68	16	25	41	79	4	1	1	2	4
2007–08	St. John's Fog Devils	QMJHL	65	16	25	41	92	6	2	4	6	12
2008–09	Montreal Junior Hockey Club	QMJHL	59	5	29	34	63	10	4	8	12	34
2009–10	Portland Pirates	AHL	65	6	17	23	64	4	0	1	1	2
2010–11	Portland Pirates	AHL	72	15	24	39	49	4	0	1	1	6
2011–12	Rochester Americans	AHL	52	16	14	30	39	3	2	0	2	6
2011–12	Buffalo Sabres	NHL	11	1	0	1	6	—	—	—	—	—
2012–13	Rochester Americans	AHL	36	14	21	35	57	—	—	—	—	—
2012–13	Buffalo Sabres	NHL	10	1	0	1	6	—	—	—	—	—
2012–13	Florida Panthers	NHL	19	2	7	9	2	—	—	—	—	—
2013–14	Toronto Marlies	AHL	76	25	47	72	115	14	6	8	14	10
2014–15	Rockford IceHogs	AHL	54	9	27	36	59	—	—	—	—	—
2014–15	Toronto Marlies	AHL	19	3	13	16	12	5	3	4	7	12
2014–15	Toronto Maple Leafs	NHL	6	0	1	1	9	—	—	—	—	—
2015–16	Toronto Marlies	AHL	69	25	43	68	53	15	5	4	9	14
2015–16	Toronto Maple Leafs	NHL	7	1	0	1	6	—	—	—	—	—
2016–17	Lehigh Valley Phantoms	AHL	76	21	39	60	101	5	1	3	4	4
2017–18	Lehigh Valley Phantoms	AHL	63	14	31	45	75	13	1	5	6	12
2018–19	Lehigh Valley Phantoms	AHL	63	8	35	43	66	—	—	—	—	—
2019–20	Lehigh Valley Phantoms	AHL	28	1	7	8	42	—	—	—	—	—
2019–20	Rockford IceHogs	AHL	6	0	3	3	2	—	—	—	—	—
2020–21	HC Thurgau	SL	22	10	14	24	22	6	2	2	4	8
2021–22	EC Red Bull Salzburg	ICEHL	48	20	27	47	22	12	7	5	12	20
2022–23	HC Ajoie	NL	49	16	15	31	45	—	—	—	—	—
2023–24	HC Ajoie	NL	35	4	15	19	20	—	—	—	—	—
2024–25	HC Ajoie	NL	25	6	7	13	8	—	—	—	—	—
AHL totals			679	157	321	478	734	63	18	26	44	66
NHL totals			53	5	8	13	29	—	—	—	—	—

== Awards and honors ==
Award	Year
QMJHL
Raymond Lagacé Trophy	2006–07
AHL
Eddie Shore Award	2013–14, 2015–16
First All-Star Team	2013–14, 2015–16, 2016–17
Second All-Star Team	2017–18
All-Star Classic participant	2014–15, 2015–16

Awards and achievements
Preceded by Ondrej Pavelec	Winner of the Raymond Lagacé Trophy; 2006–07	Succeeded by Olivier Roy
