= Timo Pielmeier =

German ice hockey player

- Born: July 7, 1989 (age 37) Deggendorf, West Germany
- Height: 6 ft 0 in (183 cm)
- Weight: 181 lb (82 kg; 12 st 13 lb)
- Position: Goaltender
- Catches: Left
- team Former teams: Free Agent; Anaheim Ducks; ERC Ingolstadt
- National team: Germany
- NHL draft: 83rd overall, 2007; San Jose Sharks
- Playing career: 2009–present

Timo Pielmeier (born July 7, 1989) is a German professional ice hockey goaltender, currently an unrestricted free agent. He most recently played with ERC Ingolstadt of the Deutsche Eishockey Liga (DEL). He was a third-round selection of the San Jose Sharks in the 2007 NHL entry draft prior to being traded to the Anaheim Ducks.

== Playing career ==
Pielmeier first played junior hockey in his native Germany, leading the Cologne EC Junior Sharks to the Deutsche Nachwuchs-Liga in 2006–07. He moved to North America the following season, joining the St. John's Fog Devils of the Quebec Major Junior Hockey League (QMJHL) for a season before moving to the Shawinigan Cataractes in 2008–09 where he led the team to the QMJHL final.

He has played with the German national junior team on several occasions. He first played in the 2006 IIHF World U18 Championships, and the 2007 World Junior Ice Hockey Championships. Playing in the Division 1A pool at the 2008 World Junior, Pielmeier was named the tournament's top goaltender, as Germany won the title, earning promotion back to the A pool for 2009.

Pielmeier was selected by the San Jose Sharks in the third round, 83rd overall at the 2007 NHL entry draft, but was traded to the Anaheim Ducks organization in 2009. He turned professional in 2009, starting with the Bakersfield Condors of the ECHL. He scored a goal for the Condors during the 2009–10 season, becoming the 10th goaltender in ECHL history to do so. He finished the season fifth amongst rookie goaltenders in goals against average and appeared in the 2010 ECHL All-Star Game. Pielmeier was promoted to the Syracuse Crunch of the American Hockey League for the 2009–10 season. Pielmeier was recalled by the Ducks on January 22, 2011 . He was traded along with defenceman Kurtis Foster, on December 12, 2011, to the New Jersey Devils in exchange for defenceman Mark Fraser and forward Rod Pelley.

On February 8, 2013, whilst impressing with the Landshut Cannibals, Pielmeier was signed by ERC Ingolstadt for the 2013–14 season in the Deutsche Eishockey Liga.

== International play ==
Medal record

Representing Germany

Ice hockey

Olympic Games
Silver medal – second place	2018 Pyeongchang	

He played his first game with the German men's national team in December 2013.

Pielmeier was nominated to be Team Germany's backup goalie during the 2018 Winter Olympics in Pyeongchang, South Korea. He appeared in 1 game in the tournament as Germany captured the silver medal. He also represented Germany at the 2018 IIHF World Championship.

== Career statistics ==
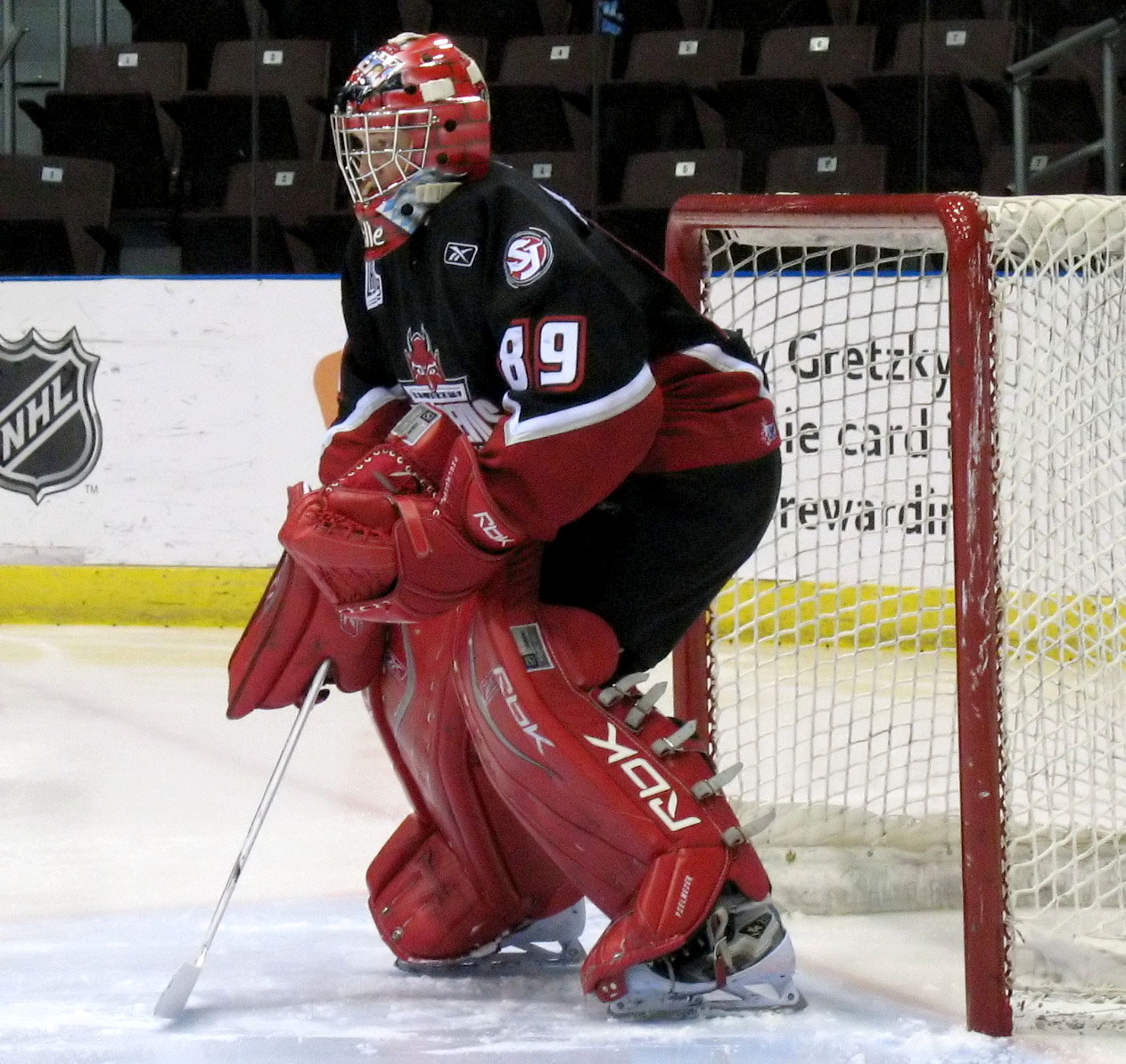

=== Regular season and playoffs ===
			Regular season									Playoffs
Season	Team	League	GP	W	L	OT	MIN	GA	SO	GAA	SV%	GP	W	L	MIN	GA	SO	GAA	SV%
2007–08	St. John's Fog Devils	QMJHL	50	23	22	4	2719	136	1	3.00	.909	5	0	3	221	22	0	5.71	.838
2008–09	Shawinigan Cataractes	QMJHL	43	30	9	2	2407	107	2	2.67	.913	18	12	5	1021	47	0	2.76	.898
2009–10	Bakersfield Condors	ECHL	57	27	22	5	3251	178	0	3.29	.883	4	1	2	247	14	0	3.39	.893
2010–11	Syracuse Crunch	AHL	37	16	17	1	1942	100	1	3.09	.906	—	—	—	—	—	—	—	—
2010–11	Anaheim Ducks	NHL	1	0	0	0	40	5	0	7.50	.583	—	—	—	—	—	—	—	—
2010–11	Elmira Jackals	ECHL	2	1	0	1	125	7	0	3.37	.873	—	—	—	—	—	—	—	—
2011–12	Elmira Jackals	ECHL	33	17	10	3	1896	86	0	2.72	.910	3	0	2	172	9	0	3.13	.906
2011–12	Albany Devils	AHL	2	1	0	0	78	3	0	2.31	.938	—	—	—	—	—	—	—	—
2012–13	EV Landshut	2.GBun	48	27	21	0	2931	111	4	2.27	—	6	—	—	371	17	0	2.75	—
2013–14	ERC Ingolstadt	DEL	43	20	23	0	2596	110	4	2.54	.911	21	14	7	1243	38	2	1.83	.944
2014–15	ERC Ingolstadt	DEL	51	29	22	0	3007	138	2	2.75	.914	18	10	8	1095	47	0	2.58	.920
2015–16	ERC Ingolstadt	DEL	52	23	29	0	3058	149	0	2.92	.907	2	0	2	125	6	0	2.89	.910
2016–17	ERC Ingolstadt	DEL	44	21	23	0	2536	118	2	2.79	.910	—	—	—	—	—	—	—	—
2017–18	ERC Ingolstadt	DEL	35	22	12	0	2055	76	6	2.22	.927	5	1	4	333	17	0	3.00	.910
2018–19	ERC Ingolstadt	DEL	25	13	10	0	1392	66	1	2.84	.900	2	0	1	96	4	0	2.00	.880
2019–20	ERC Ingolstadt	DEL	23	10	10	0	1250	61	0	2.93	.896	—	—	—	—	—	—	—	—
NHL totals			1	0	0	0	40	5	0	7.50	.583	—	—	—	—	—	—	—	—
