= St. John's Fog Devils =

Former Canadian junior ice hockey team

- City: St. John's, Newfoundland and Labrador
- League: QMJHL
- Division: Eastern
- Operated: 2005–2008
- Home arena: Mile One Centre
- Colours: Black, red, white and silver
- Owner: Dermot Dobbin

Franchise history
- 2005–2008: St. John's Fog Devils
- 2008–2011: Montreal Junior Hockey Club
- 2011–present: Blainville-Boisbriand Armada

The St. John's Fog Devils were a junior ice hockey team in the Eastern Division of the Quebec Major Junior Hockey League (QMJHL) from 2005 to 2008. They were based in St. John's, Newfoundland and Labrador, Canada, and played at Mile One Centre. The QMJHL expanded to St. John's to fill the void created by the departure of the American Hockey League's St. John's Maple Leafs, when the Maple Leafs moved to Toronto, Ontario, as the Toronto Marlies after the 2004–05 season.

The team announced its relocation to suburban Montreal to become the Montreal Junior Hockey Club on March 10, 2008.

== Front office ==
The St. John's Fog Devils were owned by Dermot Dobbin. The day-to-day operations were headed up by Brad Dobbin, who was on the board of governors, and a staff of employees that included some former staff of the St. John's Maple Leafs. Jos Canale served as an advisor of scouting players.

== History ==
The team's shoulder logo for their white and black jerseys.

The city of St. John's, Newfoundland & Labrador was awarded an expansion team by the QMJHL in December 2004 with local businessmen Craig Dobbin and Dermot Dobbin being the successful bidders. After a dispute between the Dobbin group and the City of St. John's over the use of Mile One Centre, the Fog Devils announced in September 2005 they had secured a lease for the arena.

The Fog Devils entered into the QMJHL Expansion Draft in the early summer of 2005 to build the core of their team for the inaugural season. The Fog Devils, along with expansion cousins the Saint John Sea Dogs, alternated between picks choosing players left unprotected by the other clubs of the QMJHL prior to the Expansion Draft. Some notable players selected by the Fog Devils included Scott Brophy, Wes Welcher, Marty Doyle, Ilia Ejov, Olivier Guilbault, Pier-Alexandre Poulin, and Nicolas Bachand.

The team took part in their first QMJHL Entry Draft in June 2005. With the first selection in club history, the Fog Devils selected forward Jean-Simon Allard. Other notable players selected in the Entry Draft included Matt Fillier, Matt Boland, Josh McKinnon, Nick Layton and Pat O'Keefe. Shortly after, the team also participated in the CHL import draft, selecting Swedish prospect Nicklas Bergfors as well as countryman Oscar Sundh; however Bergfors only played a few exhibition games for the Fog Devils before spending the 2005–06 season as the youngest player in the American Hockey League for the Albany River Rats.

=== Inaugural season ===
The Fog Devils first captain was Newfoundlander Scott Brophy. The team played their first game September 16, 2005, winning 3–2 versus the Saint John Sea Dogs in Saint John, New Brunswick at Harbour Station. Their home opener was September 23 versus the Lewiston Maineiacs, played in front of a crowd of 6,247. The Fog Devils won 3–2 in a shootout, with Anthony Pototschnik scoring the shootout winner.

St. John's recorded the first back-to-back wins in franchise history with wins against the Gatineau Olympiques on November 4 and 5, 2005. On November 5, 2005, the line of Scott Brophy, Oscar Sundh, and Nicolas Bachand combined for 12 points with 4 points each. On December 17, 2005, in a game against the Cape Breton Screaming Eagles, Scott Brophy scored the first hat trick for the Fog Devils. His third goal came with 10.1 seconds left in the overtime period.

St. John's made the playoffs in their first season, earning the sixth seed in the East Division and finishing with a 30-34-5-1 record and 66 points. In the playoffs the Fog Devils lost in the first round in five games to Cape Breton. They were the second-most successful QMJHL expansion team in league history after the 1982–83 Longueuil Chevaliers.

The St. John's Fog Devils entered their second QMJHL Entry Draft on June 10, 2006, and selected St. John's native Luke Adam with their first round pick (7th overall). In total the team selected six Newfoundlanders and a total of fourteen players. On June 28, 2006, the St. John's Fog Devils selected Mario Kempe (31st overall) and Joonas Salmi (66th overall) in the 2006 CHL Import Draft.

=== 2006–07 season ===
The St. John's Fog Devils opened the 2006–07 season on September 15, 2006, at Mile One Centre against the visiting PEI Rocket in front of over 5800 people. The Rocket defeated the Fog Devils by a score of 5–2. The Fog Devils rebounded the next night to win their first game of the season against the PEI Rocket by a score of 5–3. St. John's native Wes Welcher was named the game's first star with two goals. The Fog Devils closed out the year at 28–36–4–2, slightly worse than their inaugural year. They clinched the seventh seed in the west, which caused them to once again take on the Cape Breton Screaming Eagles in the playoffs, only to get swept. The 2007 NHL entry draft saw the first Fog Devils drafted into the NHL, with T.J. Brennan and Jean-Simon Allard both drafted by the Buffalo Sabres, Mario Kempe drafted by the Philadelphia Flyers, and Matt Fillier drafted by the Los Angeles Kings. The Fog Devils selected German goaltender Timo Pielmeier, drafted 83rd Overall by the San Jose Sharks at the 2007 NHL Entry Draft, with the 12th Overall selection in the 2007 CHL Import Draft. After much speculation that Pielmeier would stay in his native Germany to play in 2007–08, he agreed to move to the CHL and join the Fog Devils.

=== 2007–08 season ===
At the Fog Devils' first home game of the season on September 21 the team retired inaugural captain Scott Brophy's jersey number 12. During a game against Shawinigan on October third, head coach Real Paiement tied the QMJHL record for most games as a head coach, at 988 games. He surpassed this two nights later during a game against the Lewiston Maineiacs. He finished the season with a new record, 1056 games. During the week of October 22, 2007, the Fog Devils' goalie Timo Pielmeier was named the QMJHL defensive player of the week. On November 9, Luke Adam set a new franchise record for scoring the most goals in a single game, with four against the visiting Maineiacs.

The Fog Devils met the Acadie-Bathurst Titan in the first round of the President's Cup Playoffs, losing the first two games in Bathurst (8–5 and 5–4). The Fog Devils returned home on March 25 and made a comeback from a 4–0 deficit to defeat the Titan 6–5 in regulation. On the power play late in the game defenseman Maxime Pomerleau scored the game-winning goal with 0.7 seconds left on the clock. The Fog Devils defeated the Titan 6–1 the next night to tie the series at two games apiece. On March 28 the Fog Devils fell to the Titan 7–2 in what was the final home game in franchise history. The team received a standing ovation farewell. Three nights later in Bathurst, New Brunswick, the Titan eliminated the Fog Devils from the playoffs with a 4–3 win, closing out the series four games to two.

In early December, Fog Devils President Brad Dobbin made it publicly known that the Fog Devils were in financial trouble. Dobbin stated the team lost nearly $750 000 in year two, and noted a drop in average attendance for a third straight season. On January 22, the Fog Devils were officially sold to Montreal businessman Farrell Miller. On March 10, 2008, a press conference confirmed the relocation of the Fog Devils. The team was renamed the Montreal Junior Hockey Club, playing at the Verdun Auditorium.

Following the sale of the Fog Devils, Newfoundland and Labrador was the only province in Canada without a CHL franchise until 2025 when the Acadie-Bathurst Titan relocated to St. John’s and became the Newfoundland Regiment.

== NHL players ==
As of 2019–20, five Fog Devils alumni have played in the NHL: Luke Adam, T.J. Brennan, Timo Pielmeier, Mario Kempe and Jake Allen.

The Fog Devils had several players drafted by National Hockey League teams. They are:

2007 NHL Draft

- T.J. Brennan (2007 2nd round, #31 overall by Buffalo Sabres)
- Timo Pielmeier (2007 3rd round, #83 overall by San Jose Sharks)
- Mario Kempe (2007 5th round, #122 overall by Philadelphia Flyers)
- Jean-Simon Allard (2007 5th round, #147 overall by Buffalo Sabres)
- Matt Fillier (2007 7th round, #188 overall by Los Angeles Kings)

2008 NHL Draft

- Jake Allen (2008 2nd round, # 34 overall by St. Louis Blues)
- Luke Adam (2008 2nd round, # 44 overall by Buffalo Sabres)

== Players ==
Team captains

- Matt Fillier, 2006–2008 (became captain in November)
- Zach Firlotte, 2006 (September–November)
- Scott Brophy, 2005–06

Retired numbers

- #12 Scott Brophy

=== Award winners ===
Raymond Lagacé Trophy
Defensive Rookie of the Year

- 2006–07: T.J. Brennan

== Team records ==
=== Regular season ===
Single game

- Goals (individual) - Luke Adam broke the franchise record for scoring the most goals in a single game, scoring 4 goals in a game against the Lewiston Maineiacs on November 9, 2007.
- Assists - Jean-Simon Allard broke the record by getting 5 helpers on February 14, 2007, against the Shawinigan Cataractes.
- Points - Nick Layton got the team record for points in one game by getting 1 goal and 4 assists against Victoriaville on November 30, 2007. Later that season, JS Allard got 5 assists in one game as stated above, to tie this record.
- Goals (team) - On February 2, 2007, the team scored 9 goals against the Quebec Remparts. The team also scored this many February 14, 2007 against Shawinigan.

Complete season

- Goals (individual) - Ryan Graham scored 37 goals in 66 games during the 2006–07 season.
- Assists - In the 2006–07 season, Wes Welcher tallied 55 assists in 69 games.
- Points - Wes Welcher added 21 goals to his record-breaking amount of assists for a total of 76 points in the 2006–07 season, enough to break this record as well.
- GAA - Timo Pielmeier had a 2.94 goals against average in the 2007–08 season.
- SV% - Timo Pielmeier also has this record with a .911 save percentage in the 2007–08 season. This was also league-leading.
- Shutouts - In the 2007–08 season Jake Allen obtained this record with 2 shutouts.

== League records ==
- Coach Real Paiement broke the record for most games in the QMJHL as head coach with 989 games on October 5, 2007.
- Real Paiement won his 500th game as a head coach in the QMJHL against the Saint John Sea Dogs at Harbour Station.

== Season-by-season results ==
=== Regular season ===
Legend: OTL = Overtime loss, SL = Shootout loss

| Season | Games | Won | Lost | SL | OTL | Points | Pct % | GF | GA | Standing |
|---|---|---|---|---|---|---|---|---|---|---|
| 2005–06 | 70 | 30 | 34 | 1 | 5 | 66 | 0.429 | 219 | 286 | 6th East |
| 2006–07 | 70 | 28 | 36 | 4 | 2 | 62 | 0.400 | 280 | 310 | 7th East |
| 2007–08 | 70 | 32 | 30 | 1 | 7 | 72 | 0.457 | 217 | 225 | 6th East |

=== Playoffs ===
- 2005–06 - Lost to Cape Breton Screaming Eagles 4 games to 1 in conference quarter-finals.
- 2006–07 - Lost to Cape Breton Screaming Eagles 4 games to 0 in conference quarter-finals.
- 2007–08 - Lost to Acadie-Bathurst Titan 4 games to 2 in conference quarter-finals.

== See also ==
- List of ice hockey teams in Newfoundland and Labrador
