= Russ Adam =

Canadian ice hockey player

- Born: May 5, 1961 (age 65) Windsor, Ontario, Canada
- Height: 5 ft 10 in (178 cm)
- Weight: 185 lb (84 kg; 13 st 3 lb)
- Position: Centre
- Shot: Left
- Played for: AHL; New Brunswick Hawks; St. Catharines Saints; NHL; Toronto Maple Leafs
- NHL draft: 137th overall, 1980; Toronto Maple Leafs
- Playing career: 1981–1986

Russell Norman Adam (born May 5, 1961) is a Canadian former professional ice hockey player who played eight games in the National Hockey League (NHL) for the Toronto Maple Leafs. Russ is the father of current hockey player Luke Adam.

== Playing career ==
Born in Windsor, Ontario, Adam was drafted in the seventh round, 137th overall, by the Toronto Maple Leafs in the 1980 NHL entry draft. He played a total of eight games in the NHL, all for the Leafs. He managed 1 goal, 3 points, and 11 penalty minutes in the 1982–83 season. Adam ended his playing days in St. John's, Newfoundland and Labrador in the Newfoundland Senior Hockey League. He resides in St. John's to this day with his wife Paula. Russ's son Luke was drafted 44th overall by the Buffalo Sabres in the 2008 NHL entry draft in Ottawa.

== Career statistics ==
=== Regular season and playoffs ===
			Regular season					Playoffs
Season	Team	League	GP	G	A	Pts	PIM	GP	G	A	Pts	PIM
1977–78	Windsor Spitfires	OMJHL	3	1	2	3	0	—	—	—	—	—
1978–79	Kitchener Rangers	OMJHL	63	20	17	37	37	—	—	—	—	—
1979–80	Kitchener Rangers	OMJHL	54	37	34	71	143	—	—	—	—	—
1980–81	Kitchener Rangers	OHL	64	37	50	87	215	—	—	—	—	—
1981–82	New Brunswick Hawks	AHL	51	11	21	32	50	12	3	5	8	32
1982–83	St. Catharines Saints	OHA	64	19	17	36	119	—	—	—	—	—
1982–83	Toronto Maple Leafs	NHL	8	1	2	3	11	—	—	—	—	—
1983–84	St. Catharines Saints	AHL	70	32	24	56	76	7	0	1	1	10
1984–85	Fort Wayne Komets	IHL	60	28	46	74	56	—	—	—	—	—
1985–86	Fort Wayne Komets	IHL	48	24	37	61	36	14	7	13	20	0
NHL totals			8	1	2	3	11	—	—	—	—	—
