= Jake Allen =

Canadian ice hockey player (born 1990)

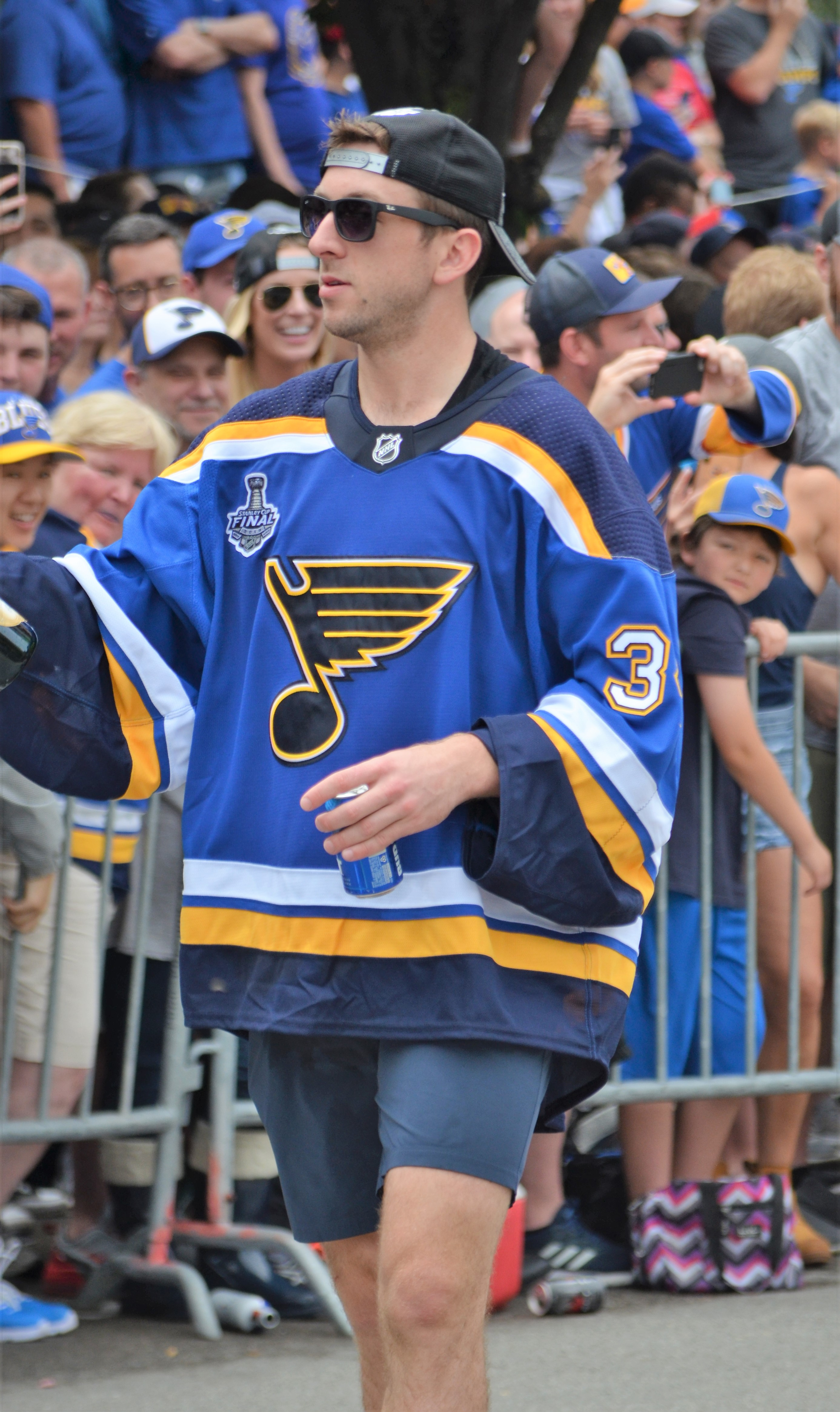
- Allen with the St. Louis Blues in 2019
- Born: August 7, 1990 (age 36) Fredericton, New Brunswick, Canada
- Height: 6 ft 2 in (188 cm)
- Weight: 203 lb (92 kg; 14 st 7 lb)
- Position: Goaltender
- Catches: Left
- NHL team Former teams: New Jersey Devils; St. Louis Blues; Montreal Canadiens
- NHL draft: 34th overall, 2008; St. Louis Blues
- Playing career: 2010–present

Jake Allen (born August 7, 1990) is a Canadian professional ice hockey player who is a goaltender for the New Jersey Devils of the National Hockey League (NHL). He was selected in the second round, 34th overall, by the St. Louis Blues in the 2008 NHL entry draft and won the Stanley Cup with the Blues in 2019. Allen has also previously played for the Montreal Canadiens.

== Playing career ==
=== Amateur ===
Allen was born in Fredericton, New Brunswick, and played for the Midget "AAA" Fredericton Canadiens before being selected in the third round of the 2007 Quebec Major Junior Hockey League (QMJHL) draft by the St. John's Fog Devils. After one season with the team, the Fog Devils were sold and relocated to Verdun, a Montreal suburb, becoming the Montreal Junior Hockey Club for the 2008–09 season. In January 2010, Allen was traded to the Drummondville Voltigeurs following the annual World Juniors tournament, and posted a record of 18 wins and three losses with a .933 save percentage and 1.75 goals against average (GAA). He was named the recipient of the Jacques Plante Memorial Trophy as QMJHL goaltender of the year in 2009–10.

=== Professional ===
==== St. Louis Blues (2012–2020) ====
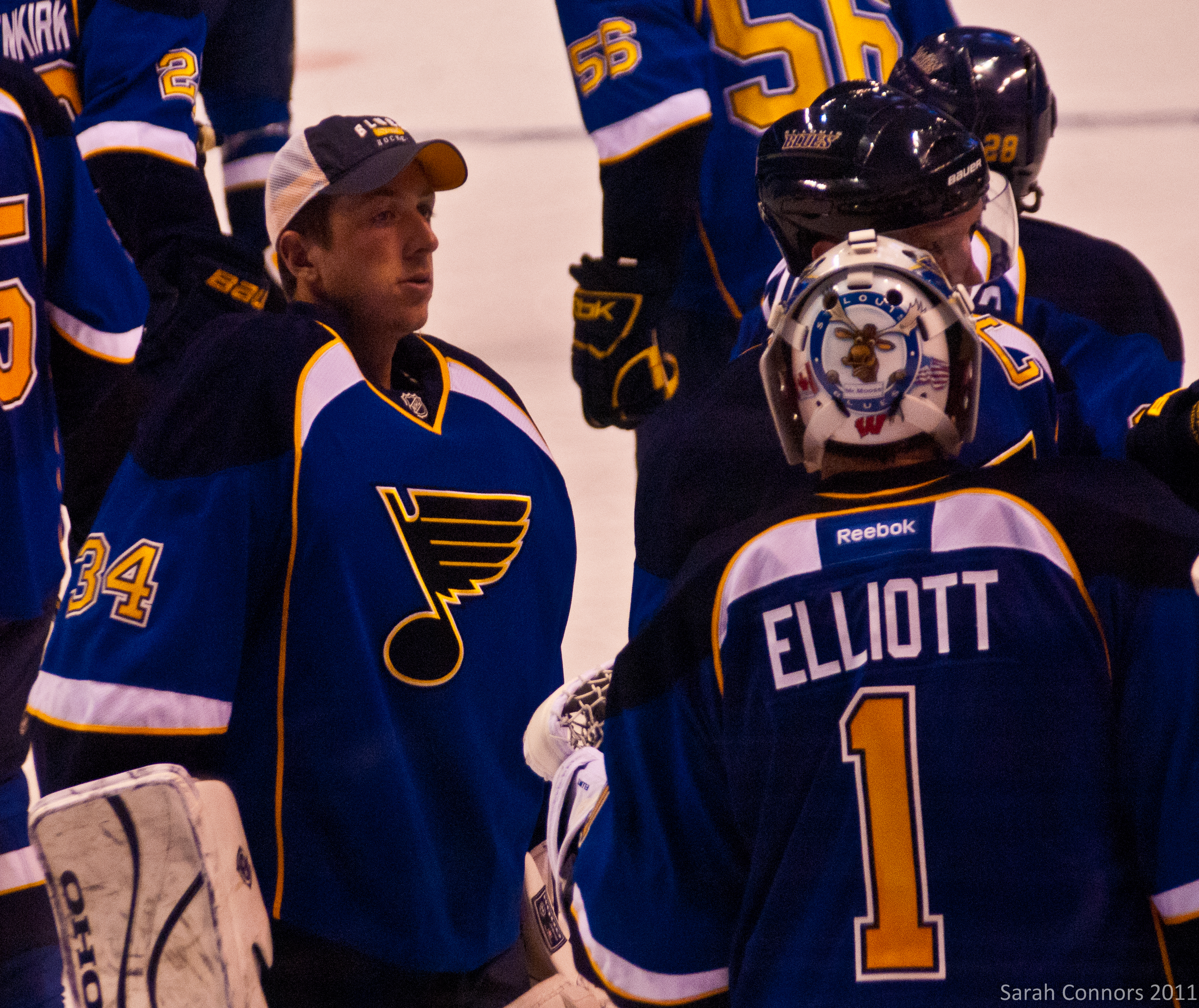
Allen (left) with the Blues in 2012

On October 22, 2008, Allen was signed to an entry-level contract by draft team, the St. Louis Blues. He made his NHL debut during the 2012 Stanley Cup playoffs, coming in to briefly relieve Brian Elliott late in the Blues' second game against the Los Angeles Kings in the Western Conference semifinals on April 30. Amidst the lockout-shortened 2012–13 season, Allen was recalled to the Blues and recorded his first NHL start and win in a 4–3 overtime victory over the Detroit Red Wings on February 13, 2013.

In April 2014, Allen was named the recipient of the Aldege "Baz" Bastien Memorial Award as the American Hockey League's (AHL) best goaltender for the 2013–14 season.

On March 26, 2016, Allen registered a 4–0 shutout win over the Washington Capitals to help the Blues break their franchise record for longest stretch without allowing a goal. In the 2015–16 season, he tallied 26 wins along with a 2.35 GAA and .920 save percentage.

During the 2016–17 season, Allen was pulled four times in six starts during a rough stretch of play, including a poor showing on January 19, 2017, where he allowed four goals on 10 shots against the Washington Capitals. Allen did not travel with the team to Winnipeg for the January 21 game against the Winnipeg Jets, and stayed home to be with his newborn daughter. He was scheduled to rejoin the team on January 23, for the remaining two games of the road trip. His play soon rebounded however, and he was named Second Star of the Week on February 13. Allen went 3–0–0 with a 1.00 GAA, a .967 save percentage along with his 13th career shutout against the Ottawa Senators on February 7. His two other wins were against the Toronto Maple Leafs on February 9, and Montreal Canadiens on February 11.

On November 16, 2017, Allen recorded his 100th career NHL win in a 4–1 defeat of the Edmonton Oilers.

Allen won the Stanley Cup behind rookie netminder Jordan Binnington in the 2019 Stanley Cup Final. He had begun the season as the starting goaltender, however, after the team dove to last place in league standings midway through the 2018–19 campaign, the latter was given a shot. While Binnington shone in goal, Allen finished the second half of the season with a 5–4–4 record.

==== Montreal Canadiens (2020–2024) ====
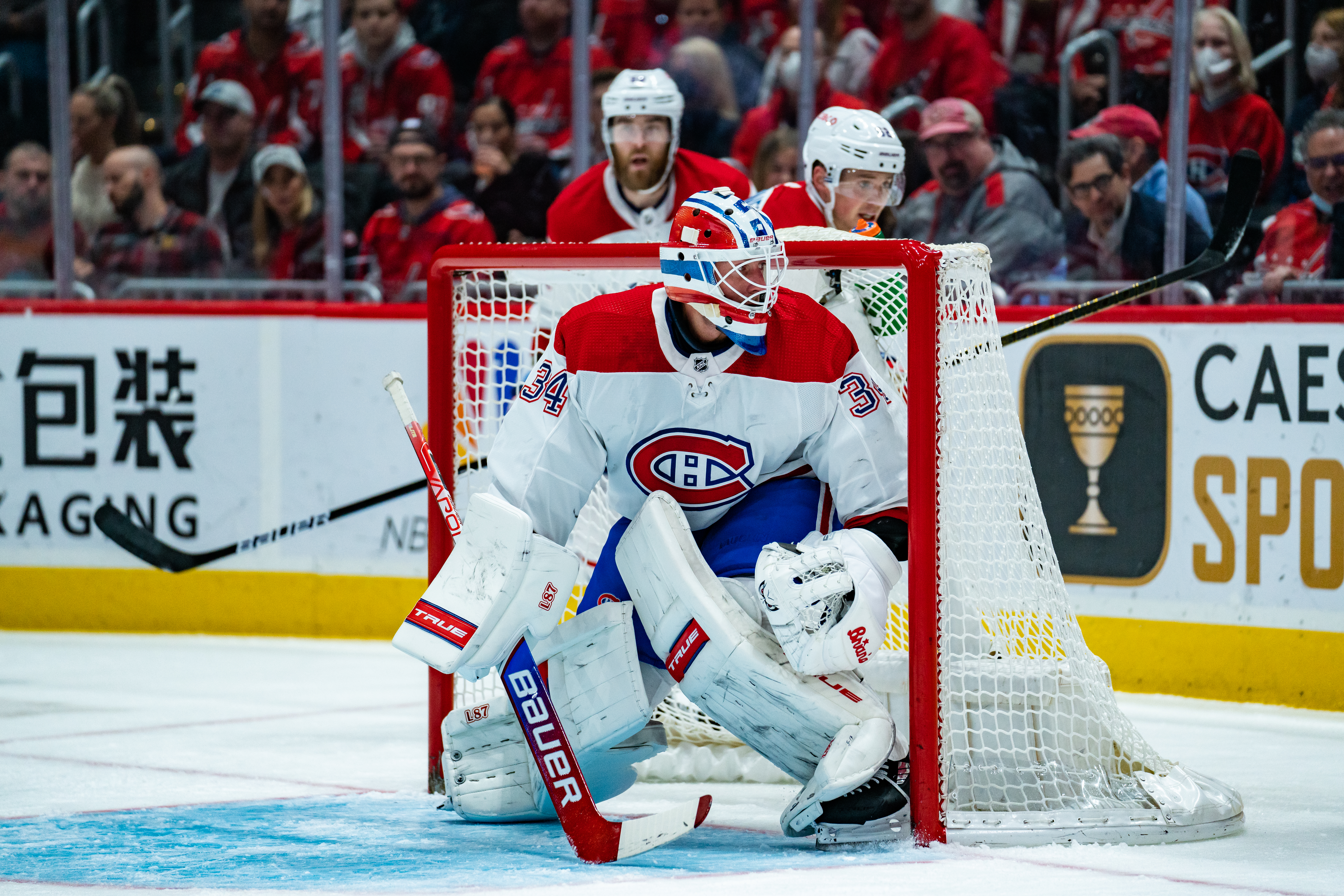
Allen in net for the Canadiens in 2021

On September 2, 2020, Allen was traded to the Montreal Canadiens with a 2022 seventh-round pick in exchange for 2020 third-round and seventh-round picks. On October 14, he signed a two-year, $5.75 million contract extension with the Canadiens to take him through the 2022–23 season.

Allen immediately distinguished himself as a capable backup goaltender to Carey Price, especially during a stretch of the 2020–21 season where Price was unable to play due to a concussion. Allen's performance in net was widely credited with allowing the Canadiens to make the 2021 Stanley Cup playoffs, though Allen did not see action during the playoffs following Price's return. For his efforts, Allen received recognition as the team's annual recipient of the Jacques Beauchamp Molson Trophy, awarded to the player deemed to have had a dominant role during the course of the regular season.

Entering the off-season, it was widely assumed that Allen would be taken by the Seattle Kraken in the 2021 NHL expansion draft, as the rules allowed for teams to protect only one goaltender, and Price had a contractual guarantee of such protection. However, Price and Canadiens general manager Marc Bergevin opted to waive Price's no-trade clause and expose him, allowing them to protect Allen while calculating that Price's age and salary would deter the Kraken from taking him.

Following Price entering into the National Hockey League Players' Association's (NHLPA) Player Assistance Program at the start of the 2021–22 season, Allen again assumed the role as the Canadiens' starting goaltender. He was generally judged to be performing strongly even as the team struggled offensively, most notably posting a 45-save shutout in an October 28 road game against the San Jose Sharks that represented the Canadiens' first victory in San Jose in over two decades. On January 12, 2022, Allen sustained a groin injury in a game against the Boston Bruins, and it was announced that he would miss eight weeks of the season. He returned to the team for a March 17 game against the Dallas Stars, making several noteworthy saves in a 4–3 overtime loss. Allen made 10 more appearances in net with the Canadiens, but was forced to exit an April 9 game against the Toronto Maple Leafs after suffering a lower body injury while attempting to stop a shot by Leafs forward Auston Matthews. Missing the team's remaining schedule with yet another groin injury, Allen referred to his sophomore campaign with Montreal as a "season from hell."

With Price ruled out of the lineup for the entirety of the 2022–23 season, Allen, entering the final year of his contract with the Canadiens, assumed the role as the team's starting goaltender. On September 28, 2022, newly appointed team general manager Kent Hughes confirmed that he was hoping to negotiate a contract extension with Allen. Shortly afterward, on October 1, Allen signed a two-year, $7.7 million extension with the Canadiens. The ensuing season was marked by the ascending profile of Allen's former backup goaltender, Sam Montembeault, who enjoyed success early on in a supporting role before taking over for a stretch of games in January 2023 when Allen himself was injured. Upon Allen's return to the lineup, he and Montembeault largely alternated starts on an equal basis. Allen finished third in Molson Cup voting as the team's most valuable player at the end of the year, behind captain Nick Suzuki and Montembeault respectively.

Montreal began the 2023–24 season with three goaltenders on their active roster as, in addition to Allen and Montembeault, prospect Cayden Primeau was no longer exempt from waivers and thus could not be sent down to AHL affiliate Laval Rocket without possibly being lost to another team. This precipitated discussions about one of the netminders being traded. Despite his sporadic use, Allen played in his 400th career NHL game on November 2, 2023, and would post a 6–12–3 record and .892 save percentage for the Canadiens that season.

==== New Jersey Devils (2024–present) ====
On March 8, 2024, Allen was traded to the New Jersey Devils in exchange for a conditional 2025 third-round pick. He made his Devils debut on March 14, making 35 saves in a 6–2 victory over the Dallas Stars.

With a 20-save shutout against the Utah Hockey Club on October 14, Allen effectively became the first goaltender in NHL history to record a victory against 33 different league franchises. On November 23, he registered his 200th career win in a 3–2 victory over the Washington Capitals.

Entering the off-season as an unrestricted free agent, Allen agreed to a five-year contract extension with the Devils on July 1, 2025.

== International play ==
Medal record

Men's ice hockey

Representing Canada

World Junior Championships
Silver medal – second place	2010 Canada	

World U18 Championships
Gold medal – first place	2008 Russia	

Allen was chosen to play for the Canadian under-18 team in the 2008 World U18 Championships where he won gold and was named both top goaltender and the tournament's most valuable player (MVP).

He then represented the national junior team at the 2010 World Junior Championships, capturing a silver medal after posting four wins and one subsequent loss in the final to Team USA.

== Personal life ==
As a teenager, Allen was a promising young golfer, and won back-to-back junior golf championships on the same course he worked on up until he was drafted to the NHL.

Allen and his wife Shannon have three daughters.

== Career statistics ==
=== Regular season and playoffs ===
			Regular season									Playoffs
Season	Team	League	GP	W	L	OT	MIN	GA	SO	GAA	SV%	GP	W	L	MIN	GA	SO	GAA	SV%
2007–08	St. John's Fog Devils	QMJHL	30	9	8	4	1,507	76	2	3.14	.901	4	2	1	128	8	0	3.74	.855
2008–09	Montreal Junior Hockey Club	QMJHL	53	28	25	0	3,023	144	3	2.86	.916	10	4	6	585	35	1	3.59	.897
2009–10	Montreal Junior Hockey Club	QMJHL	23	11	11	0	1,241	55	1	2.66	.912	—	—	—	—	—	—	—	—
2009–10	Drummondville Voltigeurs	QMJHL	22	18	3	0	1,271	37	3	1.75	.933	14	9	5	840	34	1	2.43	.899
2010–11	Peoria Rivermen	AHL	47	25	19	3	2,805	118	6	2.52	.917	3	0	3	189	12	0	3.80	.888
2011–12	Peoria Rivermen	AHL	38	13	20	2	2,148	105	1	2.93	.915	—	—	—	—	—	—	—	—
2011–12	St. Louis Blues	NHL	—	—	—	—	—	—	—	—	—	1	0	0	1	0	0	0.00	1.000
2012–13	Peoria Rivermen	AHL	35	13	19	2	2,054	99	2	2.89	.904	—	—	—	—	—	—	—	—
2012–13	St. Louis Blues	NHL	15	9	4	0	804	33	1	2.46	.905	—	—	—	—	—	—	—	—
2013–14	Chicago Wolves	AHL	52	33	16	3	3,138	106	7	2.03	.928	9	3	6	511	28	1	3.29	.879
2014–15	St. Louis Blues	NHL	37	22	7	4	2,077	79	4	2.28	.913	6	2	4	328	12	0	2.20	.904
2015–16	St. Louis Blues	NHL	47	26	15	3	2,584	101	6	2.35	.920	5	1	1	170	7	0	2.49	.897
2016–17	St. Louis Blues	NHL	61	33	20	5	3,419	138	4	2.42	.915	11	6	5	675	22	0	1.96	.935
2017–18	St. Louis Blues	NHL	59	27	25	3	3,317	152	1	2.75	.906	—	—	—	—	—	—	—	—
2018–19	St. Louis Blues	NHL	46	19	17	8	2,568	121	3	2.83	.905	1	0	0	24	1	0	2.45	.750
2019–20	St. Louis Blues	NHL	24	12	6	3	1,339	48	2	2.15	.927	5	2	1	286	9	0	1.89	.935
2020–21	Montreal Canadiens	NHL	29	11	12	5	1,703	76	0	2.68	.907	—	—	—	—	—	—	—	—
2021–22	Montreal Canadiens	NHL	35	9	20	4	1,948	107	2	3.30	.905	—	—	—	—	—	—	—	—
2022–23	Montreal Canadiens	NHL	42	15	24	3	2,451	145	1	3.55	.891	—	—	—	—	—	—	—	—
2023–24	Montreal Canadiens	NHL	21	6	12	3	1,216	74	0	3.65	.892	—	—	—	—	—	—	—	—
2023–24	New Jersey Devils	NHL	13	6	6	1	771	40	0	3.11	.900	—	—	—	—	—	—	—	—
2024–25	New Jersey Devils	NHL	31	13	16	1	1,738	75	4	2.66	.908	—	—	—	—	—	—	—	—
2025–26	New Jersey Devils	NHL	37	17	17	2	2,187	99	1	2.72	.904	—	—	—	—	—	—	—	—
NHL totals			497	225	201	45	28,119	1,288	29	2.75	.907	29	11	11	1,456	51	0	2.06	.925

=== International ===
Year	Team	Event	Result	GP	W	L	T	MIN	GA	SO	GAA	SV%
2008	Canada	U18	1st place, gold medalist(s)	7	6	1	0	420	10	2	1.43	.948
2010	Canada	WJC	2nd place, silver medalist(s)	5	4	0	0	291	10	2	2.06	.902
Senior totals				5	4	0	0	291	10	2	2.06	.902

== Awards and honours ==
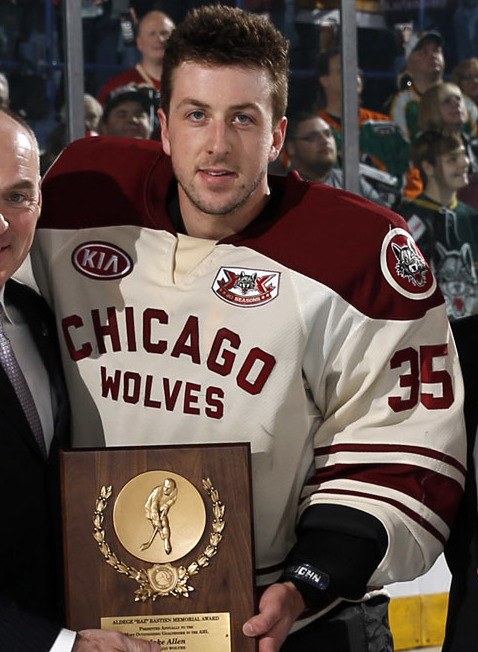
Allen being presented with the Aldege "Baz" Bastien Memorial Award in 2014

Award	Year	Ref
International
WJC18 All-Star Team	2008	
WJC18 Best Goaltender	2008	
WJC18 MVP	2008	
CHL
First All-Star Team	2010	
CHL Goaltender of the Year	2010	
QMJHL
Jacques Plante Memorial Trophy	2010	
First All-Star Team	2010	
AHL
All-Star Game	2011, 2014	
First All-Star Team	2014	
Aldege "Baz" Bastien Memorial Award	2014	
NHL
All-Rookie Team	2013, 2015	
Stanley Cup champion	2019	

Awards and achievements
Preceded by Niklas Svedberg	Aldege "Baz" Bastien Memorial Award; 2013–14	Succeeded by Matt Murray
