= Avalon Expo =

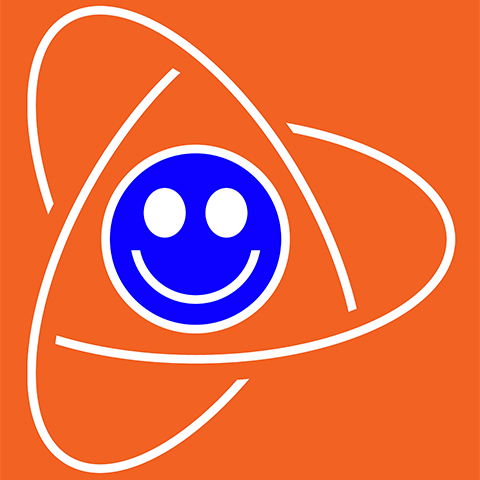
- Status: Active
- Genre: Multigenre
- Venue: St. John's Curling Club (RE/MAX Centre)
- Location: St. John's, Newfoundland and Labrador
- Country: Canada
- Inaugurated: August 29–30, 2015
- Attendance: Est. 1,000+
- Website: http://www.avalonexpo.com

Avalon Expo, commonly known as AvEx, is a fan convention focusing on geek and pop culture. Founded in 2015, it began as an annual weekend event held in St. John's, Newfoundland and Labrador in Atlantic Canada during late August, and has since expanded to a twice-yearly event in the first and second half of the year.

== Activities and events ==
- Celebrity Q&A sessions
- Autograph and Photo Opportunities
- Guest Lectures
- Authors Readings
- Artist Alley
- Specialty Vendors
- Discussion Panels
- Costume Contest
- Dressing in Costume
- Gaming demonstrations, tournaments & play

== Community involvement ==
Avalon Expo also held a two-day event in Gander, Newfoundland and Labrador called Central Pop Con. Leah Cairns was guest.

Avalon Expo also holds a one-day event in the fall in Marystown called Burin Expo. And another one-day event in the spring in Clarenville called c.dot.con.

== Event history ==
Year	Dates	Location	Attendees	Guests	Additional Info
2015	August 29–30	St. John's Curling Club (RE/MAX Centre)	Est. 750	Kalman Andrasofszky, Dan Payne, Erica Schroeder	Additionally, one of the Pontiac GTOs from Republic of Doyle was on display at the event, and the video games band, The Cartridge Family, played Saturday night.
2016	August 26–28	Centre des Grands-Vents	Est. 900	Todd Debreceni, Northern Belle Rogue, Robert J. Sawyer	Event moved to the Centre Scolaire et Communautaire des Grands-Vents and expanded to a three-day event, enabling more panels with better acoustics, food service, better parking, full wheelchair accessibility, and more.
2017	August 25–27	Mile One Centre	Est. 1,000 (individual attendees, not turnstile)	Linda Ballantyne, Katie Griffin, Colin Baker, René Auberjonois, Ali House, Lily Hunter Cosplay & Props	
2018	August 24–26	St. John's Curling Club (RE/MAX Centre)	Est. 300 (individual attendees, not turnstile)	Fujin14 Cosplay	
2019	July 19–21	St. John's Curling Club (RE/MAX Centre)	Approx. 700 (individual attendees, not turnstile)		
2020	July 31-August 2	Event went virtual		Tiffany Grant (via Zoom chat)	
2021 Fall	September 18-19	Holiday Inn St. John's Conference Centre	Approx. 1,000 (individual attendees, not turnstile, 500/day)	Amanda Labonté, Tiffany Grant (via Zoom chat)	
2022 Spring	April 29-May 1	Holiday Inn St. John's Conference Centre	Approx. 1,600 (individual attendees, not turnstile, 533/day)	Tiffany Grant, Bethany Downer, Nicole Little, Kate Sparkes, Kelley Power, Michelle Churchill, Jon Dobbin, Matthew LeDrew, Stacey Oakley, Carolyn R. Parsons	
2022 Fall	November 12-13	Holiday Inn St. John's Conference Centre	Approx. 1,200 (individual attendees, not turnstile, 600/day)	Jenny Yokobori, Lori E. White, Irma Gerd, Tingting Chen, Stacey Oakley, Kate Sparkes, Kelley Power, Michelle Churchill, Lauralana Dunne, Matt Daniels	
2023 Summer 10/X	June 30-July 2	Sheraton Hotel Newfoundland			
2023 Fall	November 25-26	Sheraton Hotel Newfoundland			
