= 2013–14 AHL season =

- League: American Hockey League
- Sport: Ice hockey
- Duration: October 4, 2013 - April 19, 2014

Regular season
- Macgregor Kilpatrick Trophy: Texas Stars
- Season MVP: Travis Morin
- Top scorer: Travis Morin

Playoffs
- Playoffs MVP: Travis Morin

Calder Cup
- Champions: Texas Stars
- Runners-up: St. John's IceCaps

AHL seasons
- 2012–13 2014–15

The 2013–14 AHL season was the 78th season of the American Hockey League. The regular season began on October 4, 2013, and ended on April 19, 2014. The 2014 Calder Cup playoffs followed the conclusion of the regular season. The Calder Cup was won by the Texas Stars for their first Calder Cup in franchise history.

== Regular season ==
The 2013–14 edition of the AHL Outdoor Classic took place on December 13, 2013, and was hosted by the Rochester Americans against the Lake Erie Monsters at Frontier Field in Rochester, New York. The Americans won the game 5–4 in a shootout before a crowd of 11,015 spectators.

The Americans also took part in the 2013 Spengler Cup between December 26 and 31, 2013, the first time since 1996 that an AHL team has participated in the tournament.

== Team and NHL affiliation changes ==
=== Relocations ===
- The Houston Aeros relocated to Des Moines, Iowa, and became the Iowa Wild but remained affiliated to the Minnesota Wild.
- The Peoria Rivermen relocated to Utica, New York, and changed their name to the Utica Comets.

=== Affiliation changes ===
AHL team	New affiliate	Old affiliate
Chicago Wolves	St. Louis Blues	Vancouver Canucks
Utica Comets	Vancouver Canucks	St. Louis Blues

=== Name changes ===
The Connecticut Whale reverted to their former name, the Hartford Wolf Pack.

== Final standings ==
y– indicates team clinched division and a playoff spot
x– indicates team clinched a playoff spot
e– indicates team was eliminated from playoff contention

=== Eastern Conference ===
Atlantic Division	GP	W	L	OTL	SOL	Pts	GF	GA
y–Manchester Monarchs (LAK)	76	48	19	3	6	105	222	183
x–St. John's IceCaps (WPG)	76	46	23	2	5	99	230	233
x–Providence Bruins (BOS)	76	40	25	2	9	91	219	209
e–Worcester Sharks (SJS)	76	36	34	4	2	78	191	228
e–Portland Pirates (PHX)	76	24	39	3	10	61	195	237

Northeast Division	GP	W	L	OTL	SOL	Pts	GF	GA
y–Springfield Falcons (CBJ)	76	47	23	1	5	100	235	186
x–Albany Devils (NJD)	76	40	23	5	8	93	213	222
e–Hartford Wolf Pack (NYR)	76	37	32	1	6	81	218	242
e–Adirondack Phantoms (PHI)	76	30	38	2	6	68	193	225
e–Bridgeport Sound Tigers (NYI)	76	28	40	2	6	64	187	223

East Division	GP	W	L	OTL	SOL	Pts	GF	GA
y–Binghamton Senators (OTT)	76	44	24	3	5	96	247	201
x–Wilkes-Barre/Scranton Penguins (PIT)	76	42	26	1	7	96	227	188
x–Norfolk Admirals (ANA)	76	40	26	3	7	90	185	178
e–Hershey Bears (WSH)	76	39	27	5	5	88	204	196
e–Syracuse Crunch (TBL)	76	31	32	4	9	75	188	207

=== Western Conference ===
West Division	GP	W	L	OTL	SOL	Pts	GF	GA
y–Texas Stars (DAL)	76	48	18	3	7	106	274	197
x–Abbotsford Heat (CGY)	76	43	25	5	3	94	237	215
x–Oklahoma City Barons (EDM)	76	36	29	2	9	83	239	256
e–Charlotte Checkers (CAR)	76	37	36	1	2	77	228	241
e–San Antonio Rampage (FLA)	76	30	37	3	6	69	206	235

Midwest Division	GP	W	L	OTL	SOL	Pts	GF	GA
y–Chicago Wolves (STL)	76	45	21	5	5	100	239	191
x–Grand Rapids Griffins (DET)	76	46	23	2	5	99	238	187
x–Milwaukee Admirals (NSH)	76	39	24	6	7	91	215	199
e–Rockford IceHogs (CHI)	76	35	32	5	4	79	234	262
e–Iowa Wild (MIN)	76	27	36	7	6	67	169	235

North Division	GP	W	L	OTL	SOL	Pts	GF	GA
y–Toronto Marlies (TOR)	76	45	25	2	4	96	223	202
x–Rochester Americans (BUF)	76	37	28	6	5	85	216	217
e–Utica Comets (VAN)	76	35	32	5	4	79	187	216
e–Lake Erie Monsters (COL)	76	32	33	1	10	75	197	232
e–Hamilton Bulldogs (MTL)	76	33	35	1	7	74	182	224

== Statistical leaders ==
=== Leading skaters ===
The following players are sorted by points, then goals. Updated as of the end of the regular season.

GP = Games played; G = Goals; A = Assists; Pts = Points; +/– = P Plus–minus; PIM = Penalty minutes

Player	Team	GP	G	A	Pts	PIM
Travis Morin	Texas Stars	66	32	56	88	52
Zach Boychuk	Charlotte Checkers	69	36	38	74	55
Andy Miele	Portland Pirates	70	27	45	72	66
T. J. Brennan	Toronto Marlies	76	25	47	72	115
Jordan Weal	Manchester Monarchs	76	23	47	70	42
Chris Terry	Charlotte Checkers	70	28	41	69	62
Spencer Abbott	Toronto Marlies	64	17	52	69	16
Mike Hoffman	Binghamton Senators	51	30	37	67	32
Curtis McKenzie	Texas Stars	75	27	38	65	92
Jason Akeson	Adirondack Phantoms	70	24	40	64	42

=== Leading goaltenders ===
The following goaltenders with a minimum 1500 minutes played lead the league in goals against average. Updated as of the end of the regular season.

GP = Games played; TOI = Time on ice (in minutes); SA = Shots against; GA = Goals against; SO = Shutouts; GAA = Goals against average; SV% = Save percentage; W = Wins; L = Losses; OT = Overtime/shootout loss

Player	Team	GP	TOI	SA	GA	SO	GAA	SV%	W	L	OT
Jake Allen	Chicago Wolves	52	3138	1467	106	7	2.03	.928	33	16	3
Petr Mrazek	Grand Rapids Griffins	32	1829	838	64	3	2.10	.924	22	9	1
Keith Kinkaid	Albany Devils	43	2518	1086	96	4	2.29	.912	24	13	5
Tom McCollum	Grand Rapids Griffins	46	2560	1256	98	2	2.30	.922	24	12	4
Malcolm Subban	Providence Bruins	33	1919	921	74	1	2.31	.920	15	10	5

== Calder Cup playoffs ==
Conference quarterfinals	Conference semifinals
1	Manchester	1
8	Norfolk	3
4	St. John's	4
8	Norfolk	2
2	Springfield	2
7	Providence	3
Eastern Conference
3	Binghamton	1
6	Wilkes-Barre/Scranton	3
6	Wilkes-Barre/Scranton	4
7	Providence	3
4	St. John's	3
5	Albany	1
1	Texas	3
8	Oklahoma City	0
1	Texas	4
4	Grand Rapids	2
2	Chicago	3
7	Rochester	2
Western Conference
3	Toronto	3
6	Milwaukee	0
2	Chicago	0
3	Toronto	4
4	Grand Rapids	3
5	Abbotsford	1

Conference finals
4	St. John's	4
6	Wilkes-Barre/Scranton	2
1	Texas	4
3	Toronto	3

Calder Cup Final
E4	St. John's	1
W1	Texas	4

== AHL awards ==
Calder Cup : Texas Stars
Les Cunningham Award : Travis Morin, Texas
John B. Sollenberger Trophy : Travis Morin, Texas
Willie Marshall Award : Zach Boychuk, Charlotte
Dudley "Red" Garrett Memorial Award : Curtis McKenzie, Texas
Eddie Shore Award : T. J. Brennan, Toronto
Aldege "Baz" Bastien Memorial Award : Jake Allen, Chicago
Harry "Hap" Holmes Memorial Award : Jeff Deslauriers & Eric Hartzell, Wilkes-Barre/Scranton
Louis A. R. Pieri Memorial Award : Jeff Blashill, Grand Rapids
Fred T. Hunt Memorial Award : Jake Dowell, Iowa
Yanick Dupre Memorial Award : Eric Neilson, Syracuse
Jack A. Butterfield Trophy : Travis Morin, Texas
Richard F. Canning Trophy : St. John's IceCaps
Robert W. Clarke Trophy : Texas Stars
Macgregor Kilpatrick Trophy: Texas Stars
Frank Mathers Trophy: Binghamton Senators
Norman R. "Bud" Poile Trophy: Chicago Wolves
Emile Francis Trophy : Manchester Monarchs
F. G. "Teddy" Oke Trophy: Springfield Falcons
Sam Pollock Trophy: Toronto Marlies
John D. Chick Trophy: Texas Stars
James C. Hendy Memorial Award: Robert Esche, Utica / Gordon Kaye, Rockford
Thomas Ebright Memorial Award: Howard Dolgon
James H. Ellery Memorial Awards: Dan Weiss, San Antonio
Ken McKenzie Award: Charlie Larson, Milwaukee
Michael Condon Memorial Award: Jim Vail

=== All-Star teams ===
First All-Star Team

- Jake Allen (G)
- T. J. Brennan (D)
- Adam Clendening (D)
- Mike Hoffman (LW)
- Travis Morin (C)
- Colton Sceviour (RW)

Second All-Star Team

- Petr Mrazek (G)
- Adam Almqvist (D)
- Brad Hunt (D)
- Zach Boychuk (LW)
- Andy Miele (C)
- Spencer Abbott (RW)

All-Rookie Team

- Joni Ortio (G)
- Brenden Kichton (D)
- Ryan Sproul (D)
- Curtis McKenzie (F)
- Teemu Pulkkinen (F)
- Ryan Strome (F)

== 2014 AHL All-Stars ==
This was the AHL roster for a game against Färjestad BK on February 12, 2014. The AHL All-stars won the game 7–2.

Player	Team	Position
Jake Allen	Chicago Wolves	G
Chad Billins	Abbotsford Heat	D
T. J. Brennan	Toronto Marlies	D
Brett Connolly	Syracuse Crunch	RW
Brian Gibbons	Wilkes-Barre/Scranton Penguins	C
Cody Goloubef	Springfield Falcons	D
Mike Hoffman	Binghamton Senators	LW
Jason Jaffray	St. John's IceCaps	LW
Brenden Kichton	St. John's IceCaps	D
Alexey Marchenko	Grand Rapids Griffins	D
Brayden McNabb	Rochester Americans	D
Travis Morin	Texas Stars	C
Brandon Pirri	Rockford IceHogs	C
Colton Sceviour	Texas Stars	RW
Colton Sissons	Milwaukee Admirals	RW
Ryan Spooner	Providence Bruins	C
Ben Street	Abbotsford Heat	C
Ryan Strome	Bridgeport Sound Tigers	C
Frederic St-Denis	Springfield Falcons	D
Dustin Tokarski	Hamilton Bulldogs	G
Linden Vey	Manchester Monarchs	RW
Joe Whitney	Albany Devils	LW
Head coaches: Jeff Blashill, Rob Zettler

== Milestones ==
- Manchester Monarchs coach Mark Morris became the 17th coach in AHL history to reach career 300 victories, with a win on November 13, 2013.
- Worcester Sharks coach Roy Sommer set a record for AHL games coached by coaching his 1,257th game on March 26, 2014, surpassing the previous record by Frank Mathers.

== See also ==
- List of AHL seasons
- 2013 in ice hockey
- 2014 in ice hockey

Preceded by 2012–13	AHL seasons	Succeeded by 2014–15
