= Montreal Junior Hockey Club =

Montreal Junior Hockey Club Le Club de Hockey Junior de Montréal
- City: Verdun, Quebec, Canada
- League: Quebec Major Junior Hockey League
- Operated: 2008–2011
- Home arena: Verdun Auditorium
- Colours: Maroon and white
- Head coach: Pascal Vincent

Franchise history
- 2005–2008: St. John's Fog Devils
- 2008–2011: Montreal Junior Hockey Club
- 2011–present: Blainville-Boisbriand Armada

The Montreal Junior Hockey Club (French: Le Club de Hockey Junior de Montréal) were a junior ice hockey team in the Quebec Major Junior Hockey League (QMJHL). The team was based out of the Verdun Auditorium, in Verdun, Quebec, Canada. The St. John's Fog Devils franchise relocated at the conclusion of the 2007–08 QMJHL season. The team's colours were maroon and white, similar to the Montreal Maroons. The Quebec Major Junior Hockey League approved the sale of the Juniors to a group led by former NHL Defensemen Joel Bouchard who moved the team to Boisbriand, Quebec for the 2011–12 season. The team plays its games at the Centre d'Excellence Sports Rousseau and is known as the Blainville-Boisbriand Armada.

== History ==
The team started out as the St. John's Fog Devils when Newfoundland was granted an expansion franchise. The team was sold to a group of people that moved the team to Montreal for the 2008–09 season. The team's inaugural captain was Matt Fillier who was also the last captain for St. John's.

=== Season by season ===
This is a list of seasons completed by the Montreal Junior Hockey Club. This list documents the records and playoff results for all seasons of the franchise since its inception in 2008.

Note: GP = Games played, W = Wins, L = Losses, T = Ties, OTL = Overtime losses, Pts = Points, GF = Goals for, GA = Goals against, PIM = Penalties in minutes, TG = Playoff series decided on total goals

Season	GP	W	L	T	OTL	Pts	GF	GA	PIM	Finish	Playoffs
2008–09	68	34	30	2	2	72	211	202	--	2nd, West Division	Won first round vs. Rouyn-Noranda Huskies 4-2; Lost 2nd round vs. Drummondville Voltigeurs, 4-0
2009–10	68	31	30	2	5	69	215	215	--	2nd, West Division	Lost first round vs. Gatineau Olympiques, 4-3
2010–11	68	46	12	5	5	102	263	185	--	1st, Telus Division	Won first round, vs. Halifax Mooseheads 4-0; Lost 2nd round vs. Lewiston Maineiacs, 4-2

== Notable players ==
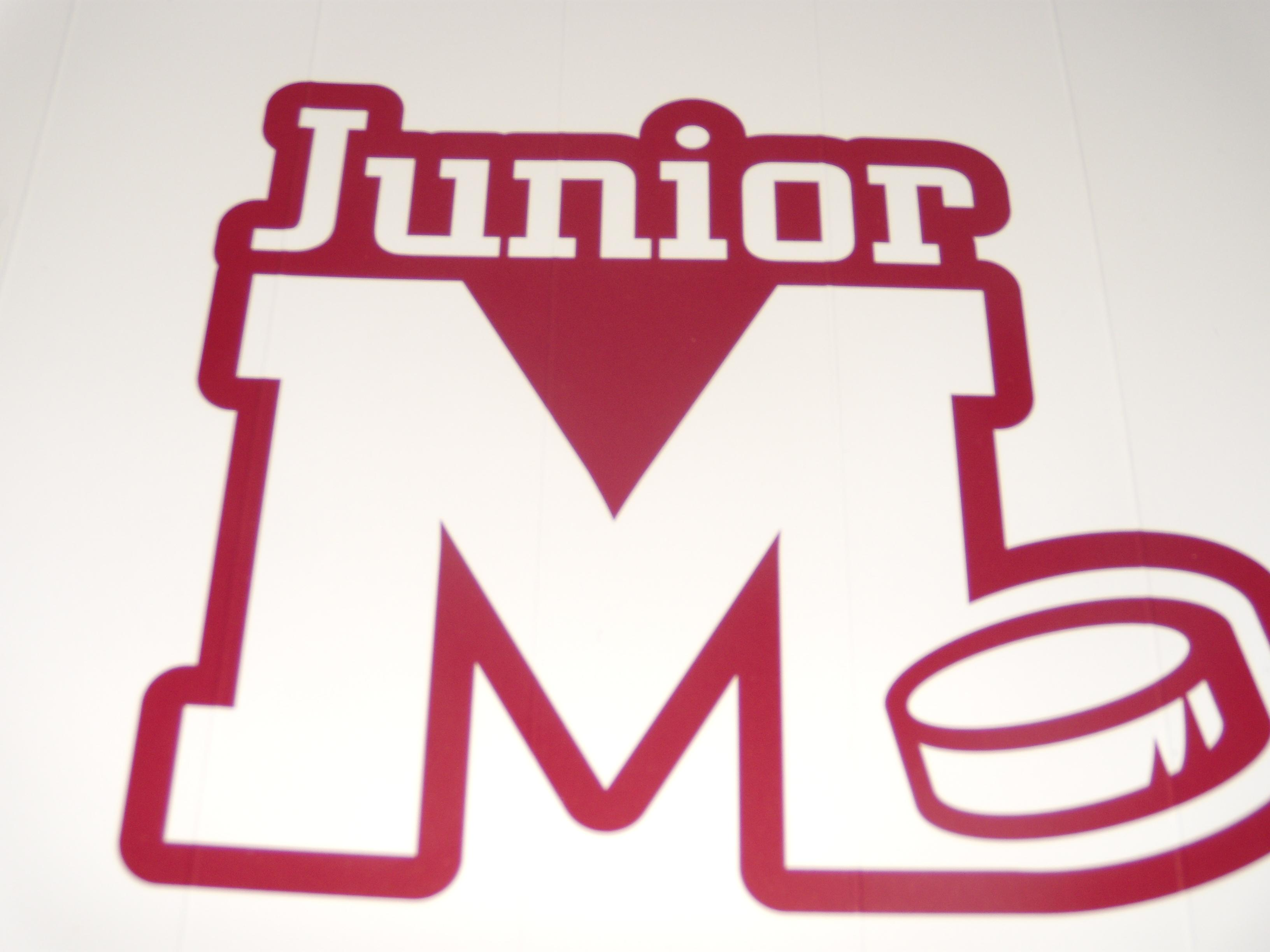
Alternate team logo

- Luke Adam, Canadian ice hockey player
- Jake Allen, Canadian ice hockey goaltender
- Jean-François Bérubé, Canadian ice hockey goaltender
- T. J. Brennan, American ice hockey player
- Xavier Ouellet, French-born Canadian ice hockey player
- Eliezer Sherbatov, Canadian-Israeli ice hockey player
