= James Reimer =

Canadian ice hockey player (born 1988)

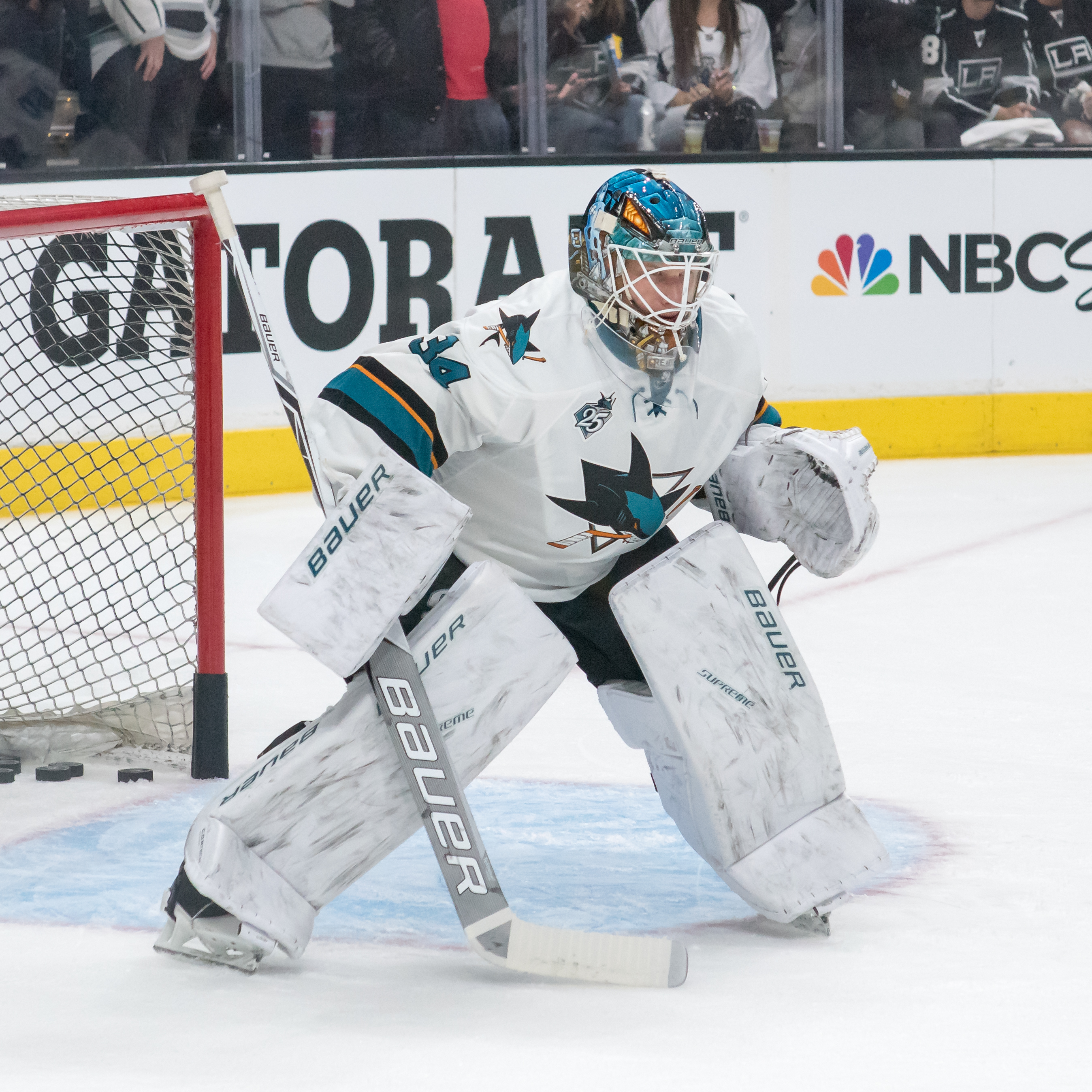
- Reimer with the San Jose Sharks during the 2016 Stanley Cup playoffs
- Born: March 15, 1988 (age 38) Arborg, Manitoba, Canada
- Height: 6 ft 3 in (191 cm)
- Weight: 205 lb (93 kg; 14 st 9 lb)
- Position: Goaltender
- Catches: Left
- team Former teams: Free agent Toronto Maple Leafs; San Jose Sharks; Florida Panthers; Carolina Hurricanes; Detroit Red Wings; Anaheim Ducks; Buffalo Sabres; Ottawa Senators; New York Rangers
- National team: Canada
- NHL draft: 99th overall, 2006; Toronto Maple Leafs
- Playing career: 2008–present

James Reimer (/ˈraɪmər/; born March 15, 1988) is a Canadian professional ice hockey player who is a goaltender. He most recently played for the New York Rangers of the National Hockey League. Reimer has previously played for the Toronto Maple Leafs, Florida Panthers, San Jose Sharks, Carolina Hurricanes, Detroit Red Wings, Buffalo Sabres, Anaheim Ducks and Ottawa Senators. Having played for nine different NHL franchises, Reimer is tied with Cam Talbot for the most teams played for among NHL goaltenders. He was selected by the Maple Leafs in the fourth round (99th overall) of the 2006 NHL entry draft. He started playing minor hockey in his hometown when he was 12. He played junior hockey with the Red Deer Rebels of the Western Hockey League (WHL), after being selected in the fifth round of the 2003 WHL bantam draft.

After turning professional, Reimer played with the South Carolina Stingrays and Reading Royals of the ECHL, as well as the Toronto Marlies of the American Hockey League (AHL). He was named the most valuable player of the ECHL playoffs, as the Stingrays won the Kelly Cup in 2009. Reimer made his NHL debut with the Maple Leafs during the 2010–11 season and went on to replace Jean-Sébastien Giguère as the Maple Leafs' starting goaltender.

Reimer plays for Canada internationally, and first represented his country at the 2011 World Championship.

== Playing career ==
=== Minor ===
Reimer started playing goaltender when his older brother, Mark, needed practice shooting but had no goaltender. A local minor hockey manager heard about his prowess in goal, and recruited him. His parents were unsure if minor hockey was the right fit for their son, so he did not play organized hockey until he was 12. He was first noticed by agent Ray Petkau when he was 13, after playing with a church team at a tournament in Steinbach, Manitoba. As of November 2011, Petkau was still his representative.

Reimer played his last seasons of minor hockey for the Interlake Lightning of the Manitoba "AAA" Midget league. He was the team's rookie of the year and top scholastic player after the 2002–03 season, and the most valuable player after the 2004–05 season.

=== Junior ===
Reimer was selected by the Red Deer Rebels of the Western Hockey League (WHL) in the fifth round of the 2003 WHL bantam braft, with a pick that originally belonged to the Spokane Chiefs. The team drafted Reimer largely on the word of a single scout, Carter Sears. After Reimer performed poorly during his first training camp with the club, Rebels head coach Brent Sutter wanted to release him, but Sears was persistent in his support for Reimer. Reimer made the club in his third attempt after having been cut the previous two seasons. His first season in the WHL was a poor one for the Rebels; Reimer played 34 games, recording only 7 wins. Reimer broke his hand late in the season, an injury which cost him a chance to play for Canada at the 2006 IIHF World U18 Championships. Reimer was selected by the Toronto Maple Leafs of the National Hockey League (NHL) in the fourth round, 99th overall, of the 2006 NHL entry draft. John Ferguson, Jr., the Maple Leafs' general manager at the time, remembers Reimer as an unfinished product needing time to develop, being "somewhat raw". At the time of the draft, Reimer was preparing for his high school graduation and did not attend the event in Vancouver. He said, "I made a decision not to pay a lot of attention because I was reluctant to get my hopes too high." His agent, Ray Petkau, called with the news about being drafted and later brought him his Maple Leafs jersey and hat that draftees receive. Prior to the draft, Reimer had mentioned he would like to be drafted by the Los Angeles Kings, saying, "I'd love to play hockey in all that sunshine."

Reimer attended training camp with the Maple Leafs in 2006 and 2007, but was returned to the Rebels both times. During the 2006–07 WHL season, he played in 60 games with the Rebels, recording 26 wins, 23 losses and 7 ties, the only season in his WHL career Reimer finished with a winning record. The 2007–08 WHL season was Reimer's final season in the WHL. He suffered a torn ligament in his ankle and only appeared in 30 games. In March 2008, the Maple Leafs signed Reimer to a three-year contract worth an annual base salary of $555,000, the minimum for an NHL player at the time. The deal included a $180,000 signing bonus and playing incentives that could increase the total value of the contract to $1.8 million.

=== Professional ===
==== Toronto Maple Leafs ====
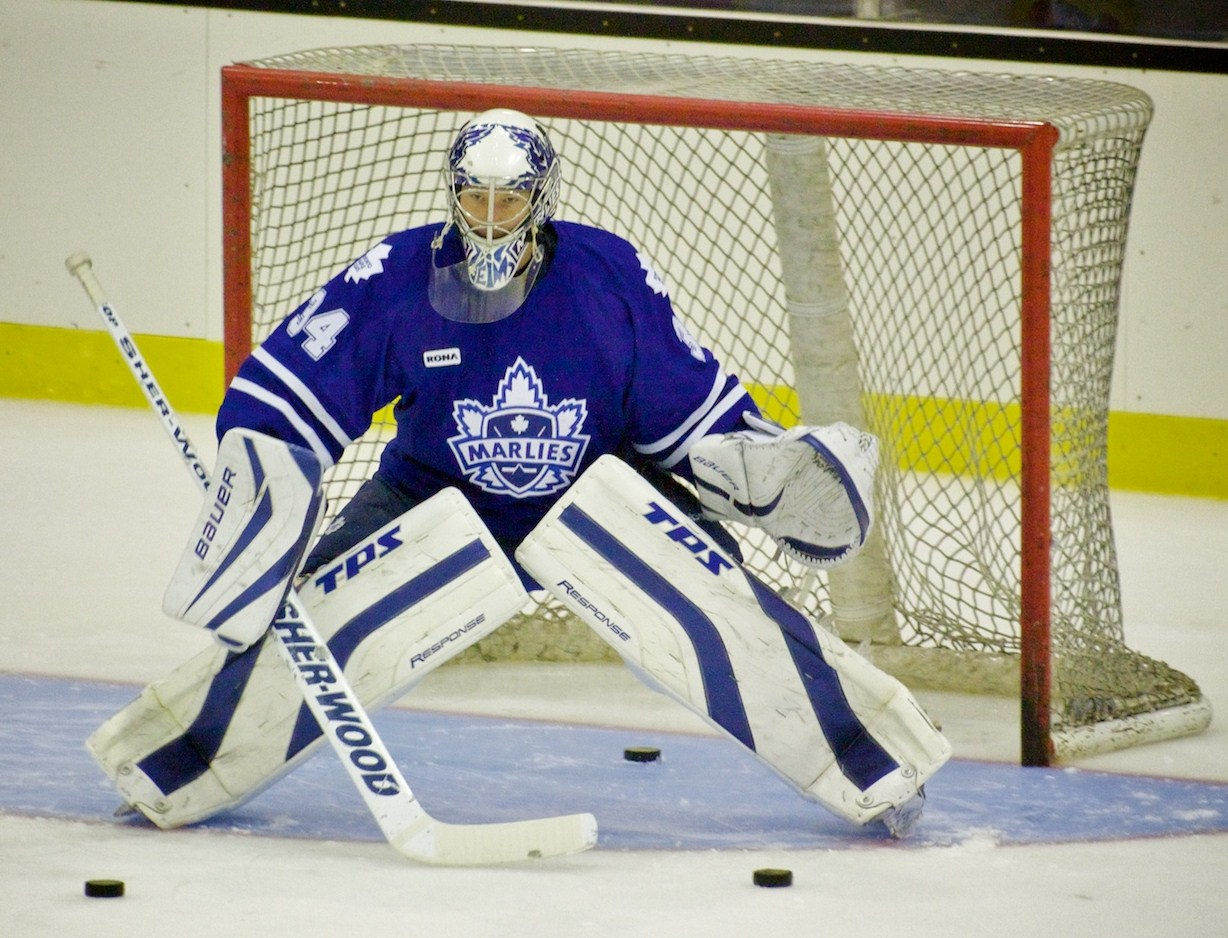
Reimer with the Marlies during warmup for the Gardiner Cup final

After attending the Maple Leafs' training camp in September 2008, Reimer was assigned to their affiliate, the Toronto Marlies, of the American Hockey League (AHL). After starting the season with the Marlies, he was assigned to the Reading Royals of the ECHL. He was recalled by the Marlies and recorded his first AHL win by a score of 3–2 in a shootout on December 27, 2008, against the Manitoba Moose. In two stints with the Marlies, Reimer had a record of one win and two losses, with a goals against average (GAA) of 3.28 and a .882 save percentage. With the Royals, Reimer had a record of ten wins, seven losses and three ties. At the ECHL trade deadline, Reimer was moved to the South Carolina Stingrays, a team that had gone through eight goaltenders during the season. The deal was facilitated to expose Reimer to post-season experience, as the Royals were out of playoff contention. While with the Stingrays, Reimer helped them win the 2009 Kelly Cup championship. Recording four wins and one shutout over eight games in the post-season, he was named the ECHL playoffs Most Valuable Player.

After attending the Maple Leafs' training camp ahead of the 2009–10 NHL season, Reimer was again sent down to the AHL. As part of the Marlies' pre-season, Reimer competed in the Gardiner Cup, held as part of Scotland's 2009 Homecoming celebrations. He stopped 33 shots in the final as the Marlies lost 3–1 to the Hamilton Bulldogs. Back in the AHL, he spent the majority of the 2009–10 season with the Marlies, playing in 26 games and recording 14 wins. He had a GAA of 2.25 and a save percentage of .925. Reimer was called up by the Leafs on an emergency basis on October 13, 2009, when starting goaltender Vesa Toskala was injured. Serving as Joey MacDonald's backup, he did not receive any playing time in his first NHL call-up and was sent back to the Marlies on October 25. Reimer missed significant time with an ankle injury during the 2009–10 season. It was not the same ankle he injured during his final season with the Red Deer Rebels.

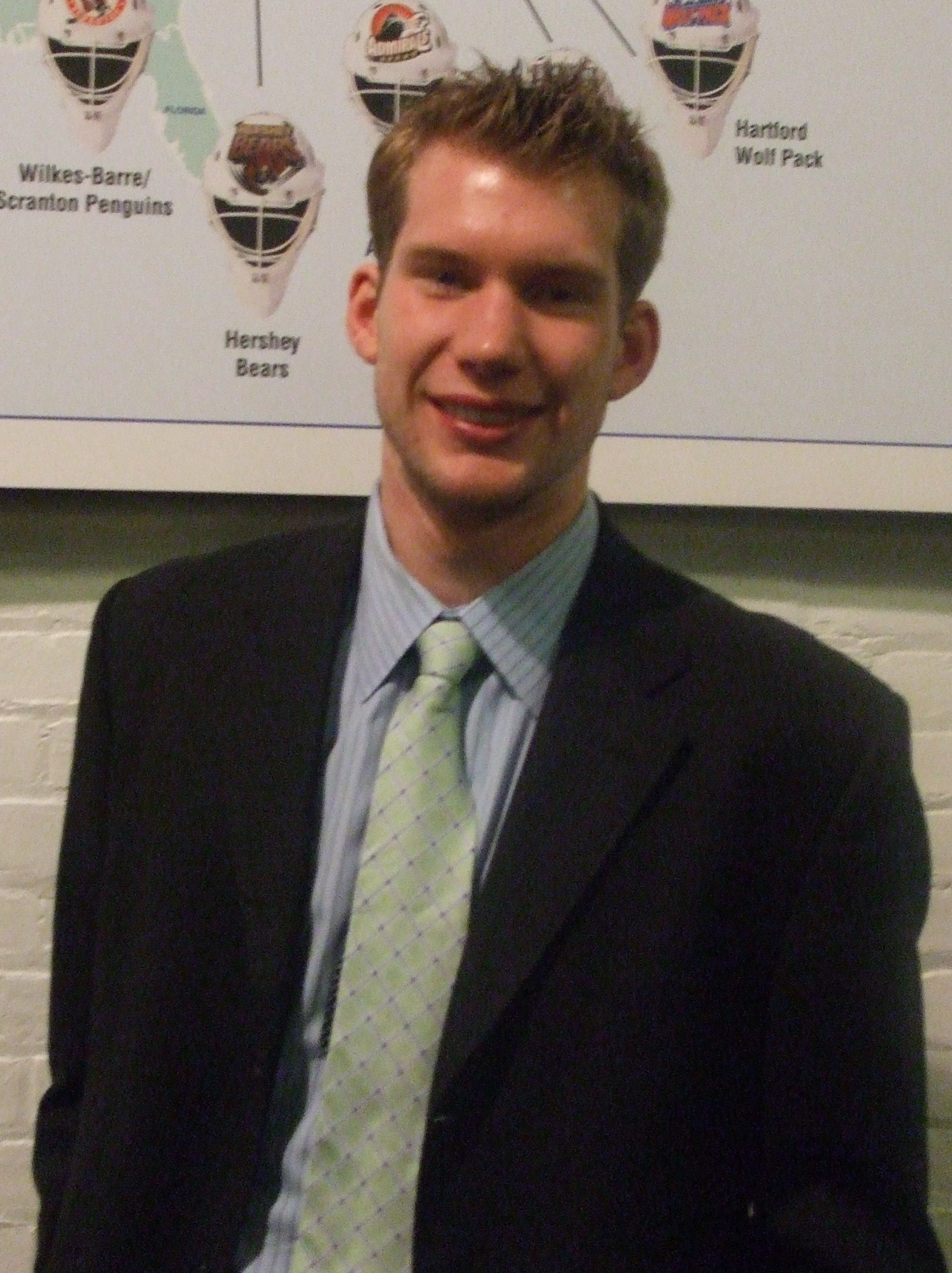
Reimer at Ricoh Coliseum after a Marlies game in December 2009

At the outset of the 2010–11 NHL season, Reimer again was assigned to the AHL's Marlies. He was not expected to contribute to the Maple Leafs at the NHL level during the 2010–11 season. Expectations for the young netminder were low heading into the season, with head coach Ron Wilson saying, "We wanted him to play in the minors and continue to get better, develop and try to stay healthy." He was recalled by the Maple Leafs several months into the season, making his NHL debut on December 20, 2010, in relief of Jonas Gustavsson against the Atlanta Thrashers. He played 14 minutes in the third period, stopping all four shots he faced. Reimer made his first NHL start against the Ottawa Senators on January 1, 2011. The Maple Leafs won the game 5–1, with Reimer recording 32 saves while picking up his first career NHL win. On February 3, 2011, Reimer recorded 27 saves and picked up his first career NHL shutout against the Carolina Hurricanes. A combination of injuries and poor play by Gustavsson and Jean-Sébastien Giguère provided an opportunity for Reimer at the NHL level. His strong play caused the Leafs to carry three goaltenders on their NHL roster, a fact which did not surprise Giguère, who said, "The way he played the last time he was up, you knew he was going to get another chance." Ron Wilson acknowledged Reimer as the team's starting goaltender as they set out on a late-season run for a playoff spot, saying, "It's going to be his ball the rest of the way. As long as we stay in the race. And I think he's up to it."

Reimer became a quick fan favourite during his rookie NHL season, earning the nicknames "Optimus Reim" and "The Statue". The former is a reference to the Transformers protagonist Optimus Prime, while the latter resulted from head coach Wilson's attempts to suppress the hype around the rookie goaltender only a short time into his NHL career, saying, "There's all this [attention] around here, a guy wins a game and we're ready to build a statue for him." Reimer's strong performance was recognized by the NHL when he was named Rookie of the Month for March 2011. Reimer would have become a restricted free agent on July 1, 2011, but he signed a three-year contract worth $5.4 million ($1.8 million salary cap hit) on June 9, 2011.

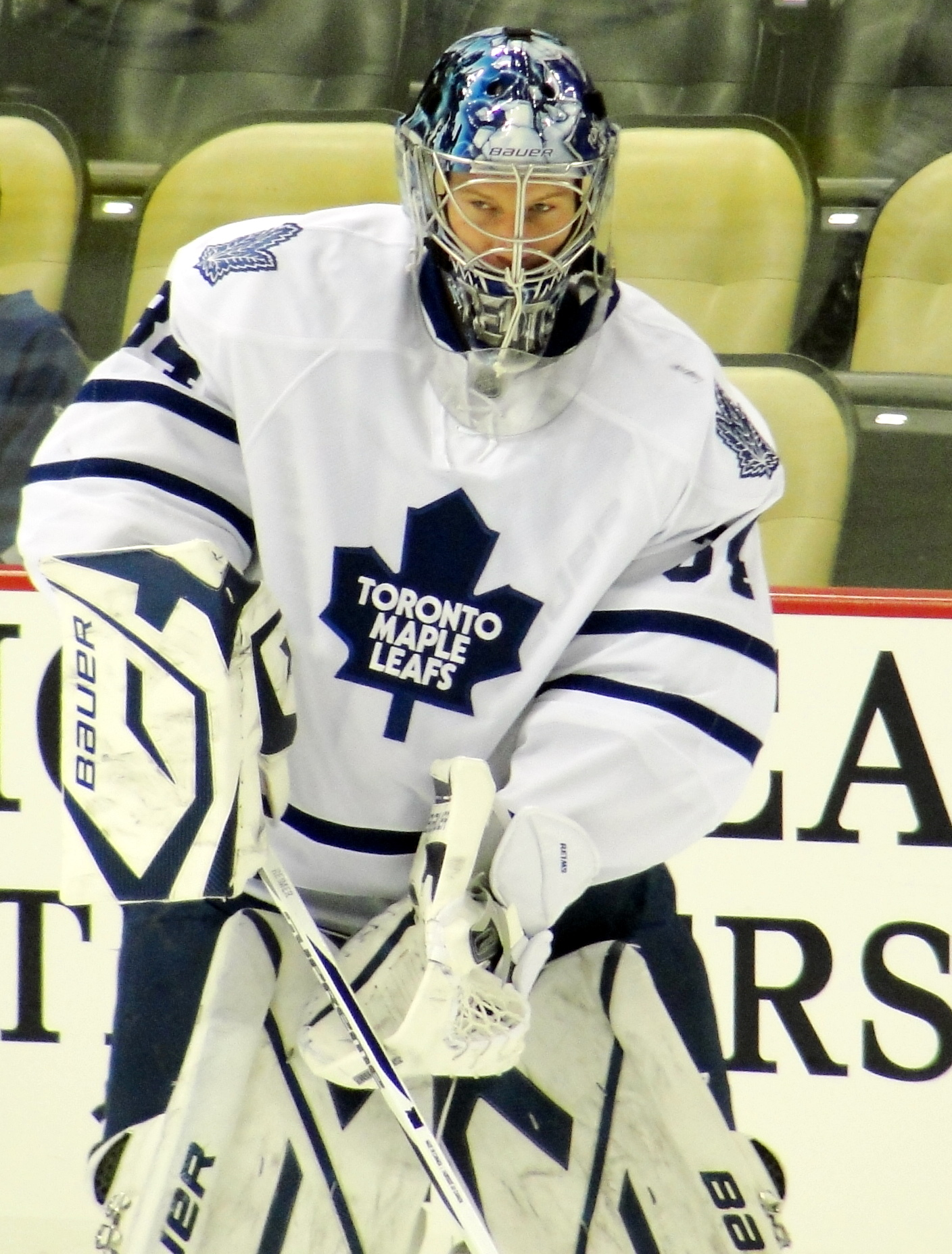
Reimer with the Maple Leafs in March 2012

Reimer began the 2011–12 season as the starter going 4–0–1. He suffered an injury on October 22 in a game against the Montreal Canadiens. During the game, Reimer was run into by Brian Gionta—he finished the first period, but did not return after the intermission. The team called the injury whiplash despite rumours that he was suffering from a concussion. Reimer missed 19 games with the injury, and struggled upon his return, yielding some starts to Gustavsson. After recording two back-to-back shutouts on February 1 and 4, Reimer seemed to have solidified the starting position once again.

Near the end of March 2012, Reimer was starting to play to an acceptable standard again, but an upper-body injury (later revealed to be a neck injury) sidelined him for the remainder of the season from March 29. On April 9, he told the media he would be available by training camp in September 2012. Due to the 2012–13 NHL lockout, Reimer was afforded more time to heal and attended training camp in January 2013. Reimer held off an early challenge from rookie backup Ben Scrivens to remain Toronto's starting goaltender. On February 11, Reimer suffered a MCL strain which kept him out of action for a little over two weeks; he won all three of his next starts after returning. Upon returning, Reimer backstopped the Maple Leafs to their first playoff berth since 2004 and finishing the regular season with a career best 2.46 GAA and .924 save percentage in 34 games.

Prior to the 2013–14 season, the club acquired Jonathan Bernier from the Los Angeles Kings. At the beginning of the season, Reimer and Bernier were splitting time in the Toronto goal, but as the season progressed, Bernier cemented his status as the Leafs' starting goaltender. The Maple Leafs lost game 7 of the series against the Boston Bruins to end their 2013 playoff run, with Reimer giving up 3 goals with less than 11 minutes left in the third period to allow Boston to equalize from a 4-1 deficit before Boston scored the series winner against Reimer in overtime.

Following the 2013–14 season, Reimer became a restricted free agent. Dissatisfied with his role as the Leafs' backup, he requested a trade from the Leafs. On July 25, 2014, the Leafs and Reimer avoided a salary arbitration hearing scheduled for the next week by agreeing to terms on a two-year contract with an average annual value of $2.3 million.

Reimer began the 2015–16 season as Bernier's backup, a role he had held since the team acquired the latter. However, Bernier was injured early in the season and Reimer was given starting duties. He took off with the job, going 3–0–0 with a 1.62 GAA and .952 save percentage to be named the third star for the week of November 9–15, 2015. Reimer would hold the position as Maple Leafs' starting goaltender for the rest of his tenure, earning praise for his play on a Toronto team that struggled throughout the year.

==== San Jose Sharks ====
As the February 29 trade deadline approached, Reimer's future with the rebuilding Maple Leafs became uncertain. On February 27, 2016, two days before the deadline, Reimer was traded to the San Jose Sharks (alongside Jeremy Morin) in exchange for Alex Stalock, Ben Smith and a conditional fourth-round pick in the 2018 NHL entry draft (condition dependent on the Sharks reaching the Stanley Cup Finals, a condition met, converting the pick to a third-round pick on May 25, 2016). Reimer had the best five-on-five save percentage and the best Fenwick save percentage in the NHL for the 2015–16 season (1,200 minutes minimum time on ice) at .9404 and .9573 respectively.

==== Florida Panthers ====
On July 1, 2016, as an unrestricted free agent for the first time in his career, Reimer was signed to a five-year contract with the Florida Panthers.

During his time in Florida, Reimer split goaltending duties with Roberto Luongo, often playing more games due to Luongo's tendency towards injury. Reimer would earn his 100th win in the NHL during the 2016–17 season.

==== Carolina Hurricanes ====
After three seasons with the Florida Panthers, Reimer was traded to the Carolina Hurricanes in exchange for Scott Darling and a 2020 sixth-round draft pick on June 30, 2019.

==== Second stint with San Jose ====
On July 28, 2021, having left the Hurricanes as an unrestricted free agent, Reimer returned to the San Jose Sharks, signing a two-year, $4.5 million contract.

==== Detroit Red Wings ====
On July 1, 2023, Reimer signed as an unrestricted free agent to a one-year, $1.5 million contract with the Detroit Red Wings.

==== Buffalo Sabres and Anaheim Ducks ====
On July 1, 2024, Reimer joined his sixth NHL club, initially adding a veteran presence in net to the Buffalo Sabres in signing a one-year, $1 million contract. Following training camp, the Sabres placed Reimer on waivers on October 6. On October 7, Reimer was claimed off waivers by the Anaheim Ducks. Remaining on the Ducks opening night roster as the backup, Reimer made two appearances to start the 2024–25 season losing both games he appeared in before he was later placed back on waivers following the return of starting goaltender John Gibson. On November 13, Reimer was re-claimed by the Sabres. Reimer made his debut for the Sabres on November 23 against the San Jose Sharks stopping 31 out of 33 shots and recording the win in a 4–2 victory.

==== Ottawa Senators ====
Reimer went un-signed for much of the 2025 offseason, before signing a professional try-out agreement (PTO) to return to the Toronto Maple Leafs on September 26, 2025. He was subsequently released on October 6, after allowing four goals on 28 shots to the Detroit Red Wings in his only preseason appearance.

After posting a .919 save percentage and 2.54 goals against average in two games for Canada at the 2025 Spengler Cup, the Ottawa Senators signed Reimer to a PTO with their AHL team, the Belleville Senators, on January 9, 2026. On January 12, Reimer subsequently signed a one-year contract with Ottawa for the remainder of the 2025–26 season.

==== New York Rangers ====
Reimer's contract was not renewed following the 2025–26 season and went unsigned at the start of the 2026–27 NHL season; he subsequently signed a PTO agreement with the Hartford Wolf Pack of the AHL on October 15, 2026. On October 25, Reimer signed a one-year contract with the New York Rangers, his ninth NHL franchise, tying him with Cam Talbot for the most among NHL goaltenders. He debuted for the Rangers on October 26, allowing three goals on eight shots to the Los Angeles Kings before being pulled after the first period. On November 7, after just two weeks with the Rangers, Reimer was placed on unconditional waivers for the purpose of contract termination.

== International play ==
Reimer's first brush with international ice hockey came near the end of the 2005–06 season. He was selected to play for Canada at the 2006 World U18 Championships, but was unable to compete due to a broken hand he suffered while playing for Red Deer. After his strong rookie season in the NHL, Reimer received invitation to play for Canada senior team at the 2011 World Championship. Reimer got his first win in the tournament beating Belarus 4–1. Reimer did not play in that year's tournament game when Canada lost to Russia in the quarterfinals and was eliminated. Reimer represented Canada at the 2025 Spengler Cup, serving as its starting goaltender.

== Playing style ==
Reimer plays in the butterfly style of goaltending. Observers have attributed Reimer's success during the 2010–11 season to his ability to maintain his focus and confidence. Reimer tries to focus on the basics of playing goal, feeling that the fundamentals of goaltending are the key to success, saying, "It's not about making the great save, or making a diving save or playing outside yourself. It's all about pushing, stopping, and being square and just relying on that. Most of the time if you let out a rebound the defenceman is there so it's more about being solid fundamentally."

== Personal life ==
Reimer was born in Arborg, Manitoba, to parents Harold and Marlene Reimer. His father owns a business moving homes. He graduated from Morweena Christian High School in his hometown. His favourite hockey team growing up was the Toronto Maple Leafs and his favourite player was Ed Belfour. Reimer met his wife, April, at a junior hockey game in Moose Jaw, Saskatchewan. The couple has two daughters who were born in 2017 and 2019 in Fort Lauderdale, Florida, while Reimer was a member of the Panthers.

Reimer is a practicing Christian, giving credit to God as a big part of his mental game. Citing his Christian faith, Reimer chose not to wear a pride-themed jersey during warmups before a game on March 18, 2023. Reimer issued a statement reading, in part, "In this specific instance, I am choosing not to endorse something that is counter to my personal convictions which are based on the Bible, the highest authority in my life. I strongly believe that every person has value and worth, and the LGBTQIA+ community, like all others, should be welcomed in all aspects of the game of hockey."

== Career statistics ==
=== Regular season and playoffs ===
			Regular season									Playoffs
Season	Team	League	GP	W	L	OTL	MIN	GA	SO	GAA	SV%	GP	W	L	MIN	GA	SO	GAA	SV%
2005–06	Red Deer Rebels	WHL	34	7	18	3	1,709	80	0	2.81	.910	—	—	—	—	—	—	—	—
2006–07	Red Deer Rebels	WHL	60	26	23	7	3,339	148	3	2.66	.912	7	3	4	417	27	0	3.88	.871
2007–08	Red Deer Rebels	WHL	30	8	15	4	1,668	76	1	2.73	.920	—	—	—	—	—	—	—	—
2008–09	Toronto Marlies	AHL	3	1	2	0	183	10	0	3.28	.880	—	—	—	—	—	—	—	—
2008–09	Reading Royals	ECHL	22	10	7	3	1,236	68	0	3.30	.904	—	—	—	—	—	—	—	—
2008–09	South Carolina Stingrays	ECHL	6	6	0	0	363	8	2	1.32	.961	8	4	1	497	18	1	2.17	.929
2009–10	Toronto Marlies	AHL	25	14	8	2	1,520	57	1	2.25	.925	—	—	—	—	—	—	—	—
2010–11	Toronto Marlies	AHL	15	9	5	1	858	37	3	2.59	.920	—	—	—	—	—	—	—	—
2010–11	Toronto Maple Leafs	NHL	37	20	10	5	2,080	90	3	2.60	.921	—	—	—	—	—	—	—	—
2011–12	Toronto Maple Leafs	NHL	34	14	14	4	1,879	97	3	3.10	.900	—	—	—	—	—	—	—	—
2012–13	Toronto Maple Leafs	NHL	33	19	8	5	1,856	76	4	2.46	.924	7	3	4	439	21	0	2.88	.922
2013–14	Toronto Maple Leafs	NHL	36	12	16	1	1,785	98	1	3.29	.911	—	—	—	—	—	—	—	—
2014–15	Toronto Maple Leafs	NHL	35	9	16	1	1,767	93	0	3.16	.907	—	—	—	—	—	—	—	—
2015–16	Toronto Maple Leafs	NHL	32	11	12	7	1,810	75	0	2.49	.918	—	—	—	—	—	—	—	—
2015–16	San Jose Sharks	NHL	8	6	2	0	481	13	3	1.62	.938	1	0	0	30	1	0	2.06	.857
2016–17	Florida Panthers	NHL	43	18	16	5	2,325	98	3	2.53	.920	—	—	—	—	—	—	—	—
2017–18	Florida Panthers	NHL	44	22	14	6	2,412	120	4	2.99	.913	—	—	—	—	—	—	—	—
2018–19	Florida Panthers	NHL	36	13	12	5	1,806	93	0	3.09	.900	—	—	—	—	—	—	—	—
2019–20	Carolina Hurricanes	NHL	25	14	6	2	1,379	61	3	2.66	.914	3	2	1	179	7	0	2.36	.934
2020–21	Carolina Hurricanes	NHL	22	15	5	2	1,332	59	0	2.66	.906	—	—	—	—	—	—	—	—
2021–22	San Jose Sharks	NHL	48	19	17	10	2,673	129	1	2.90	.911	—	—	—	—	—	—	—	—
2022–23	San Jose Sharks	NHL	43	12	21	8	1,335	147	3	3.48	.890	—	—	—	—	—	—	—	—
2023–24	Detroit Red Wings	NHL	25	11	8	2	1352	60	2	3.11	.904	—	—	—	—	—	—	—	—
2024–25	Anaheim Ducks	NHL	2	0	2	0	120	9	0	4.50	.864	—	—	—	—	—	—	—	—
2024–25	Buffalo Sabres	NHL	22	10	8	2	1243	59	1	2.85	.901	—	—	—	—	—	—	—	—
2025–26	Belleville Senators	AHL	1	0	1	0	59	6	0	6.05	.786	—	—	—	—	—	—	—	—
2025–26	Ottawa Senators	NHL	14	7	4	2	818	33	1	2.42	.886	—	—	—	—	—	—	—	—
2026–27	Hartford Wolf Pack	AHL	1	1	0	0	60	0	1	0.00	1.000	—	—	—	—	—	—	—	—
2026–27	New York Rangers	NHL	1	0	0	0	20	3	0	9.00	.625	—	—	—	—	—	—	—	—
NHL totals			540	232	191	67	29,671	1,413	32	2.88	.909	11	5	5	646	29	0	2.70	.925

=== International ===
Year	Team	Event	Result	GP	W	L	T/0T	MIN	GA	SO	GAA	SV%
2011	Canada	WC	5th	4	3	0	0	235	8	0	2.04	.920
2014	Canada	WC	5th	4	3	1	0	245	9	0	2.20	.911
Senior totals				8	6	1	0	480	17	0	2.12	.917
