= James C. Hendy Memorial Award =

American Hockey League award

The James C. Hendy Memorial Award is presented annually to an executive who has made the most outstanding contribution to the American Hockey League.

The award is named after Jim Hendy, a long-time contributor to the AHL and the general manager of the Cleveland Barons until his death in 1961.

== Winners ==
Season	Recipient	Team
1961–62	James G. Balmer	—
1962–63	C. Stafford Smythe	—
1963–64	James H. Ellery†	—
1964–65	Robert Martineau†	—
1965–66	Jack Riley	—
1966–67	Louis A.R. Pieri†	—
1967–68	John B. Sollenberger†	—
1968–69	Lloyd S. Blinco	—
1969–70	Eddie Shore	—
1970–71	Jack A. Butterfield	—
1971–72	Robert W. Clarke	—
1972–73	Richard F. Canning	—
1973–74	Arthur Whiteman	—
1974–75	Fred T. Hunt	—
1975–76	Macgregor Kilpatrick	—
1976–77	Frank Mathers	—
1977–78	Sam Pollock	—
1978–79	Harry Sinden	—
1979–80	Ned Harkness	—
1980–81	Ed Anderson	—
1981–82	Roy Mlakar	—
1982–83	George Bergantz	Rochester Americans
1983–84	Jack A. Butterfield	—
1984–85	John Haas	—
1985–86	George Guilbault	—
1986–87	Joel Schiavone	—
1987–88	Tom Mitchell	—
1988–89	Bruce Landon	—
1989–90	David Andrews	—
1990–91	Frank Mathers	—
1991–92	Gordon Anziano	—
1991–92	Pat Hickey	—
1992–93	Robert W. Clarke	—
1993–94	Tom Ebright	Portland Pirates
1994–95	Doug Burch	Albany River Rats
1995–96	Steve Donner	Rochester Americans
1996–97	Jay Feaster	Hershey Bears
1997–98	Frank Miceli	Philadelphia Phantoms
1998–99	Jody Gage	Rochester Americans
1999–00	Doug Yingst	Hershey Bears
2000–01	Stew MacDonald	Saint John Flames
2001–02	Glenn Stanford	St. John's Maple Leafs
2002–03	Jeff Barrett	Wilkes-Barre/Scranton Penguins
2003–04	Jeff Eisenberg	Manchester Monarchs
2004–05	Mark Chipman	Manitoba Moose
2005–06	Doug Yingst	Hershey Bears
2006–07	Jon Greenberg	Milwaukee Admirals
2007–08	Mark Bernard	Norfolk Admirals
2008–09	Craig Heisinger	Manitoba Moose
2009–10	Howard Dolgon	Syracuse Crunch
2010–11	Michael A. Mudd	Worcester Sharks
2011–12	Glenn Stanford	St. John's IceCaps
2012–13	Mike Gordon	Chicago Wolves
2013–14	Robert Esche	Utica Comets
2013–14	Gordon Kaye	Rockford IceHogs
2014–15	Vance Lederman	Syracuse Crunch
2015–16	Tera Black	Charlotte Checkers
2016–17	Jim Brooks; Rob Brooks	Lehigh Valley Phantoms
2017–18	Tim Gortsema	Grand Rapids Griffins
2018–19	Nathan Costa	Springfield Thunderbirds
2019–20	Frank Miceli	San Antonio Rampage
2020–21	Melissa Caruso	—
2021–22	Jon Greenberg	Milwaukee Admirals
2022–23	Bryan Helmer	Hershey Bears

† awarded posthumously
