= James G. Balmer =

James Gilmore Balmer (June 18, 1894 – December 8, 1968) was an American sports and entertainment executive from Pittsburgh who worked for the Harris chain of theaters. He was also the longtime general manager of the Harris-owned Pittsburgh Hornets of the American Hockey League and served as league president from 1961 to 1964.

== Theater ==
Balmer began his career in 1909 as a secretary to John P. Harris and Harry Davis. In 1913, Balmer helped open the Garden Pier in Atlantic City, New Jersey. In 1917, he managed the Harry Davis Grand Opera Company at the Academy of Music in Philadelphia. Balmer joined the Stanley Company of America in 1925 after they purchased the Grand Theatre from Harris and Davis. In addition to managing the Grand, Balmer also opened and managed the Stanley and Enright theaters. After Warner Bros. acquired the Stanley Company, Balmer served as the district manager for their theaters in West Virginia. In 1934, Balmer rejoined Harris Amusement Company, which was rebuilding under Harris' son, John H. Harris.

== Hockey ==
In addition to working with the Harris chain of theaters, Balmer also managed the Duquesne Gardens and the Pittsburgh Hornets hockey team. From 1961 to 1964, Balmer was president of the American Hockey League. In 1963, Balmer received the James C. Hendy Memorial Award, which is given annually to an executive who has made the most outstanding contribution to the AHL.

== Personal life ==
In 1917, Balmer married Grace Martin Cuddy of Pittsburgh. They had two sons and one daughter. One of their sons, James Balmer Jr., was a lead designer for Harley Earl and designer of the Xerox 914, the first commercially successful photocopier.

Balmer was a founding member of the Variety Club and was the charity's president from 1930 to 1932.

Balmer died of a heart attack on December 8, 1968, after delivering an address at the Pittsburgh Athletic Association.
