= Richard F. Canning Trophy =

American Hockey League trophy

The Richard F. Canning Trophy is presented annually to the team that advances to the American Hockey League's (AHL) Calder Cup Finals as the playoff winner of the Eastern Conference. Prior to 1998, it was given to the playoffs champion of the Northern Division/Conference.

The award is named after former AHL President Richard F. Canning, who served in that role from 1958 to 1961. He would serve the AHL in various roles for over five decades.

The current holders of the Richard F. Canning Trophy are the Toronto Marlies.

== Winners ==
Total awards won
Wins	Team
7	Hershey Bears
3	Springfield Indians
2	Charlotte Checkers
2	Hamilton Bulldogs
2	Portland Pirates
2	Saint John Flames
2	Syracuse Crunch
2	Wilkes-Barre/Scranton Penguins
2	Toronto Marlies
1	Adirondack Red Wings
1	Albany River Rats
1	Binghamton Senators
1	Bridgeport Sound Tigers
1	Hartford Wolf Pack
1	Manchester Monarchs
1	Norfolk Admirals
1	Philadelphia Phantoms
1	Providence Bruins
1	Springfield Thunderbirds
1	St. John's IceCaps

=== Winner by season ===
Key

- ‡ = Eventual Calder Cup champions

Awarded for	Season	Team	Win
Northern Division playoffs champion	1990	Springfield Indians‡	1
Northern Division playoffs champion	1991	Springfield Indians‡	2
Northern Division playoffs champion	1992	Adirondack Red Wings‡	1
Northern Division playoffs champion	1993	Springfield Indians	3
Northern Division playoffs champion	1994	Portland Pirates‡	1
Northern Division playoffs champion	1995	Albany River Rats‡	1
Northern Conference playoffs champion	1996	Portland Pirates	2
Northern Conference playoffs champion	1997	Hamilton Bulldogs	1
Eastern Conference playoffs champion	1998	Saint John Flames	1
Eastern Conference playoffs champion	1999	Providence Bruins‡	1
Eastern Conference playoffs champion	2000	Hartford Wolf Pack‡	1
Eastern Conference playoffs champion	2001	Saint John Flames‡	2
Eastern Conference playoffs champion	2002	Bridgeport Sound Tigers	1
Eastern Conference playoffs champion	2003	Hamilton Bulldogs	2
Eastern Conference playoffs champion	2004	Wilkes-Barre/Scranton Penguins	1
Eastern Conference playoffs champion	2005	Philadelphia Phantoms‡	1
Eastern Conference playoffs champion	2006	Hershey Bears‡	1
Eastern Conference playoffs champion	2007	Hershey Bears	2
Eastern Conference playoffs champion	2008	Wilkes-Barre/Scranton Penguins	2
Eastern Conference playoffs champion	2009	Hershey Bears‡	3
Eastern Conference playoffs champion	2010	Hershey Bears‡	4
Eastern Conference playoffs champion	2011	Binghamton Senators‡	1
Eastern Conference playoffs champion	2012	Norfolk Admirals‡	1
Eastern Conference playoffs champion	2013	Syracuse Crunch	1
Eastern Conference playoffs champion	2014	St. John's IceCaps	1
Eastern Conference playoffs champion	2015	Manchester Monarchs‡	1
Eastern Conference playoffs champion	2016	Hershey Bears	5
Eastern Conference playoffs champion	2017	Syracuse Crunch	2
Eastern Conference playoffs champion	2018	Toronto Marlies‡	1
Eastern Conference playoffs champion	2019	Charlotte Checkers‡	1
Eastern Conference playoffs champion	2020	Not awarded due to the COVID-19 pandemic	
Eastern Conference playoffs champion	2021	Not awarded; playoffs not held	
Eastern Conference playoffs champion	2022	Springfield Thunderbirds	1
Eastern Conference playoffs champion	2023	Hershey Bears‡	6
Eastern Conference playoffs champion	2024	Hershey Bears‡	7
Eastern Conference playoffs champion	2025	Charlotte Checkers	2
Eastern Conference playoffs champion	2026	Toronto Marlies‡	2
