= 1993–94 AHL season =

- League: American Hockey League
- Sport: Ice hockey

Regular season
- F. G. "Teddy" Oke Trophy: Adirondack Red Wings
- Season MVP: Rich Chernomaz
- Top scorer: Tim Taylor

Playoffs
- Playoffs MVP: Olaf Kolzig

Calder Cup
- Champions: Portland Pirates
- Runners-up: Moncton Hawks

AHL seasons
- 1992–93 1994–95

The 1993–94 AHL season was the 58th season of the American Hockey League. Sixteen teams played 80 games each in the schedule. The St. John's Maple Leafs finished first overall in the regular season. The Portland Pirates won their first Calder Cup championship.

It was the final season for founding member Springfield Indians, which would move to Worcester the following year after 52 years in Springfield.

== Team changes ==
- The Utica Devils move to Saint John, New Brunswick, becoming the Saint John Flames, playing in the Atlantic Division.
- The Baltimore Skipjacks move to Portland, Maine, becoming the Portland Pirates, playing in the North Division.
- The Halifax Citadels move to Cornwall, Ontario, becoming the Cornwall Aces, playing in the South Division.
- The Capital District Islanders move to Albany, New York, becoming the Albany River Rats.
- The New Haven Senators move to Charlottetown, Prince Edward Island, becoming the Prince Edward Island Senators, playing in the Atlantic Division.

== Final standings ==
- y– indicates team clinched division and a playoff spot
- x– indicates team clinched a playoff spot
- e– indicates team was eliminated from playoff contention

Atlantic Division	GP	W	L	T	Pts	GF	GA
y–St. John's Maple Leafs (TOR)	80	45	23	12	102	360	287
x–Saint John Flames (CGY)	80	37	33	10	84	304	305
x–Moncton Hawks (WIN)	80	37	36	7	81	310	303
x–Cape Breton Oilers (EDM)	80	32	35	13	77	316	339
e–Fredericton Canadiens (MTL)	80	31	42	7	69	294	296
e–Prince Edward Island Senators (OTT)	80	23	49	8	54	269	356

North Division	GP	W	L	T	Pts	GF	GA
y–Adirondack Red Wings (DET)	80	45	27	8	98	333	273
x–Portland Pirates (WSH)	80	43	27	10	96	328	269
x–Albany River Rats (NJD)	80	38	34	8	84	312	315
x–Springfield Indians (HFD)	80	29	38	13	71	309	327
e–Providence Bruins (BOS)	80	28	39	13	69	283	319

South Division	GP	W	L	T	Pts	GF	GA
y–Hershey Bears (PHI)	80	38	31	11	87	306	298
x–Hamilton Canucks (VAN)	80	36	37	7	79	302	305
x–Cornwall Aces (QUE)	80	33	36	11	77	294	295
x–Rochester Americans (BUF)	80	31	34	15	77	277	300
e–Binghamton Rangers (NYR)	80	33	38	9	75	312	322

== Scoring leaders ==
Note: GP = Games played; G = Goals; A = Assists; Pts = Points; PIM = Penalty minutes

Player	Team	GP	G	A	Pts	PIM
Tim Taylor	Adirondack Red Wings	79	36	81	117	86
Rich Chernomaz	St. John's Maple Leafs	78	45	65	110	199
Stephane Morin	Hamilton Canucks	69	38	71	109	48
Jeff Nelson	Portland Pirates	80	34	73	107	92
Yanic Perreault	St. John's Maple Leafs	62	45	60	105	38
Mitch Lamoureux	Hershey Bears	80	45	60	105	92
Mike Tomlak	Springfield Indians	79	44	56	100	53
Mark Pederson	Adirondack Red Wings	62	52	45	97	37
Chris Snell	St. John's Maple Leafs	75	22	74	96	92
Patrik Augusta	St. John's Maple Leafs	77	53	43	96	105

- Complete list

== Calder Cup playoffs ==
Division semifinals
A1	St. John's	4
A4	Cape Breton	1
Atlantic Division
A2	Saint John	3
A3	Moncton	4
N1	Adirondack	4
N4	Springfield	2
North Division
N2	Portland	4
N3	Albany	1
S1	Hershey	4
S4	Rochester	0
South Division
S2	Hamilton	0
S3	Cornwall	4

Division finals
A1	St. John's	2
A3	Moncton	4
N1	Adirondack	2
N2	Portland	4
S1	Hershey	3
S3	Cornwall	4

Semifinals
A3	Moncton	2
S3	Cornwall	0

Final
N2	Portland	4
A3	Moncton	2

For the Semifinal round, the team that earned the most points during the regular season out of the three remaining teams receives a bye directly to the Calder Cup Final.

== Trophy and award winners ==
=== Team awards ===
Calder Cup; Playoff champions:	Portland Pirates
Richard F. Canning Trophy; North division playoff champions:	Portland Pirates
Robert W. Clarke Trophy; South division playoff champions:	Cornwall Aces
F. G. "Teddy" Oke Trophy; Regular season champions, North Division:	Adirondack Red Wings
John D. Chick Trophy; Regular season champions, South Division:	Hershey Bears

=== Individual awards ===
Les Cunningham Award; Most valuable player:	Rich Chernomaz - St. John's Maple Leafs
John B. Sollenberger Trophy; Top point scorer:	Tim Taylor - Adirondack Red Wings
Dudley "Red" Garrett Memorial Award; Rookie of the year:	Rene Corbet - Cornwall Aces
Eddie Shore Award; Defenceman of the year:	Chris Snell - St. John's Maple Leafs
Aldege "Baz" Bastien Memorial Award; Best goaltender:	Frederic Chabot - Hershey Bears
Harry "Hap" Holmes Memorial Award; Lowest goals against average:	Olaf Kolzig & Byron Dafoe - Portland Pirates
Louis A. R. Pieri Memorial Award; Coach of the year:	Barry Trotz - Portland Pirates
Fred T. Hunt Memorial Award; Sportsmanship / Perseverance:	Jim Nesich - Cape Breton Oilers
Jack A. Butterfield Trophy; MVP of the playoffs:	Olaf Kolzig - Portland Pirates

=== Other awards ===
James C. Hendy Memorial Award; Most outstanding executive:	Tom Ebright, Portland Pirates
James H. Ellery Memorial Awards; Outstanding media coverage:	Dan Sernoffsky, Hershey, (newspaper); Don Stevens, Rochester, (radio); Cable Atlantic, St. John's, (television)
Ken McKenzie Award; Outstanding marketing executive:	Jeremy Duncan, Albany River Rats

== See also ==
- List of AHL seasons

Preceded by 1992–93 AHL season	AHL seasons	Succeeded by 1994–95 AHL season
