= Rich Chernomaz =

Canadian ice hockey coach and executive (born 1963)

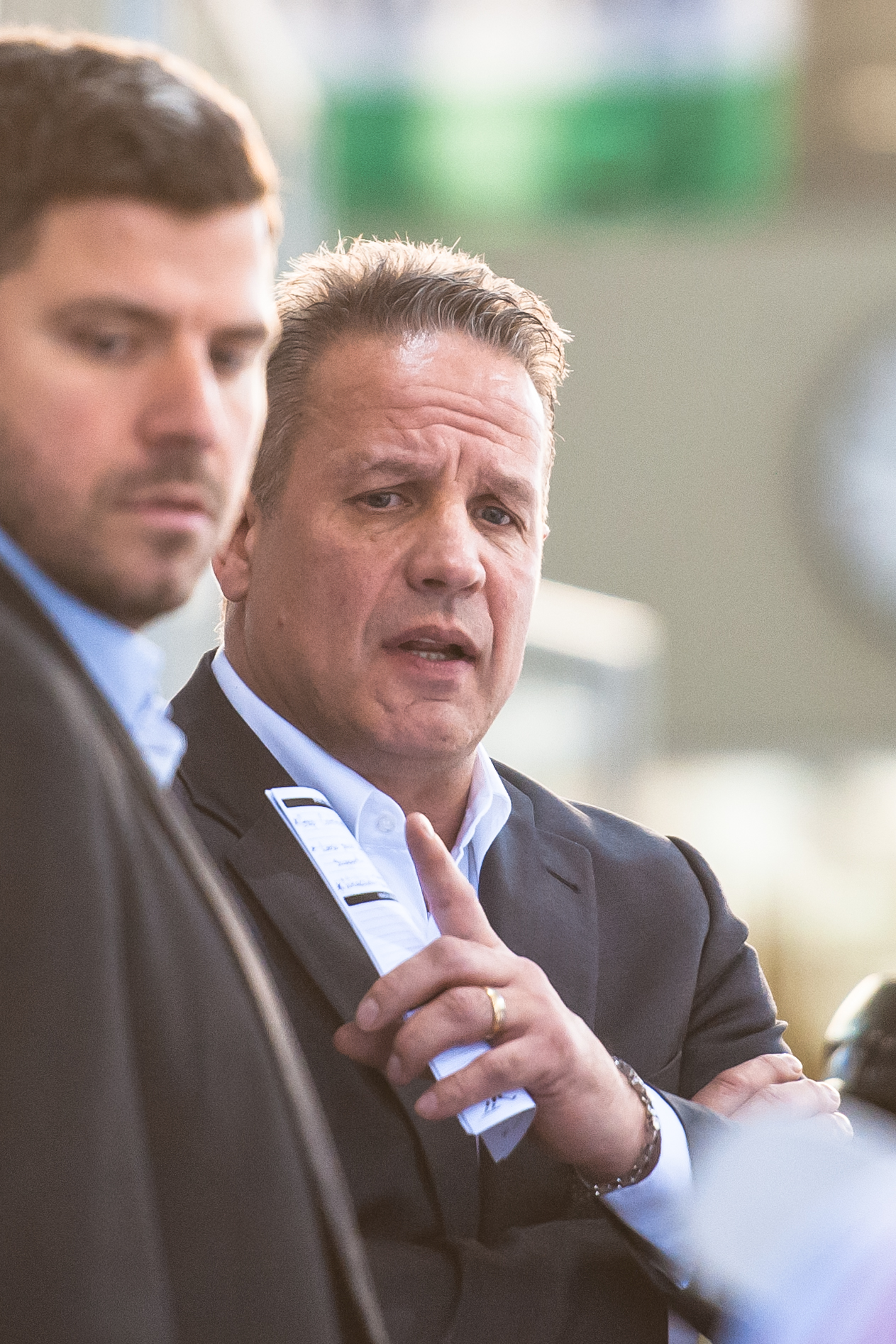
- Born: September 1, 1963 (age 63) Selkirk, Manitoba, Canada
- Height: 5 ft 8 in (173 cm)
- Weight: 185 lb (84 kg; 13 st 3 lb)
- Position: Right wing
- Shot: Right
- Played for: Colorado Rockies; New Jersey Devils; Calgary Flames; SERC Wild Wings
- National team: Canada
- NHL draft: 26th overall, 1981; Colorado Rockies
- Playing career: 1981–1999

Richard Chernomaz (born September 1, 1963) is a Canadian ice hockey coach and executive as well as former ice hockey right winger. He was most recently the head coach of the VIU Mariners Hockey team in the BCIHL.

He played 51 National Hockey League (NHL) games for the Colorado Rockies, New Jersey Devils and Calgary Flames. Chernomaz' career was spent primarily in the minor leagues where he was a two-time International Hockey League (IHL) all-star, and in 1993–94, won the Les Cunningham Award as the most valuable player of the American Hockey League (AHL). Chernomaz participated in the 1995 World Championship in Austria where he was a member of Team Canada's bronze medal-winning squad. Chernomaz remained in Europe following the tournament and played his final four seasons with the SERC Wild Wings of the Deutsche Eishockey Liga (DEL). He moved to coaching in 1999, spending time with several DEL teams and winning two German championships. He coached the Hungarian national team at the 2013 World Championship.

== Personal life ==
Chernomaz was born in Selkirk, Manitoba and raised in Port Alberni, British Columbia. He is the uncle of Nolan Patrick who was drafted second overall in the 2017 NHL entry draft.

== Playing career ==
Chernomaz played four seasons of junior hockey in the Western Hockey League (WHL) for the Saskatoon Blades and Victoria Cougars between 1979 and 1983. He scored 113 points in 1980–81 for the Cougars in the regular season. Chernomaz added 26 more in 15 playoff games, the fifth best total in the WHL, as Victoria defeated the Calgary Wranglers in the league championship final to win the President's Cup. The Colorado Rockies selected him with their second round selection, 26th overall, at the 1981 NHL entry draft, and he made his NHL debut in 1981–82, appearing in two games during a brief recall from Victoria. His NHL debut came on November 11, 1981, against the Montreal Canadiens. Chernomaz' best WHL season came in 1982–83 when he recorded 124 points in 64 games and was named a league all-star.

The Rockies relocated east to become the New Jersey Devils in 1982, and Chernomaz transferred with the team. He appeared in seven games with the Devils in 1983–84 and scored his first two NHL goals. He spent most of the season with the Devils American Hockey League (AHL) affiliate, the Maine Mariners, where he recorded 46 points in 69 games. He appeared in only two playoff games for the Mariners, but was a member of the team as they won the Calder Cup. Chernomaz spent the majority of the following three seasons in the AHL, but he did appear in 25 NHL games with the Devils in 1986–87 and scored six goals to go with four assists.

Allowed to go to free agency, Chernomaz was signed by the Calgary Flames in 1987. He was a member of the Flames organization for seven seasons, but made only sporadic appearances with Calgary and appeared in 11 games over that span, the last of which came in the 1991–92 NHL season. He played with Calgary's International Hockey League (IHL) affiliate, the Salt Lake Golden Eagles, where he was a member of the team's Turner Cup championship squad in 1987–88, and was named to the second all-star team in both 1987–88 and 1990–91.

Chernomaz joined the Toronto Maple Leafs organization in 1992 where he played two AHL seasons with the St. John's Maple Leafs. In his first, 1993–94, he scored 45 goals and 110 points that season, was named to the AHL First All-Star Team and won the Les Cunningham Award as the league's most valuable player. He served as a playing assistant coach in 1994–95. At the same time, he played two seasons in Roller Hockey International, recording 33 points in 13 games for the Utah Rollerbees in 1993 and 54 points in 17 games with the Las Vegas Flash in 1994.

Chernomaz made his lone international appearance at the 1995 World Championship in Austria. He recorded three assists in eight games for Team Canada, which won the bronze medal. Choosing to remain in Europe, he signed with the SERC Wild Wings of the Deutsche Eishockey Liga (DEL). Chernomaz played his final four seasons with the Wild Wings before retiring in 1999.

== Coaching and managing career ==
Schwenningen hired Chernomaz as the team's coach following his playing career. He spent two seasons behind the Wild Wings' bench before moving on to coach several other DEL teams: Kölner Haie, with whom he won the German championship in 2001–02, Augsburger Panther, the Frankfurt Lions where a second German title followed in 2003–04 and then ERC Ingolstadt, whom he coached until December 2012. He was hired to coach the Hungarian national team in 2013, and led the team to a bronze medal at the 2013 IIHF World Championship Division I and then to silver medal at the 2015 IIHF World Championship Division I, thus winning promotion to the 2016 Men's World Ice Hockey Championships.

Whilst working for the Hungarian federation, Chernomaz also accepted the position as sporting director at Löwen Frankfurt in 2013. In December 2015, he also took over head coaching duties in Frankfurt after the sacking of Tim Kehler. In the 2016-17 season, he handed coaching duties to Paul Gardner and remained in his job as sporting director. In 2017, the Frankfurt team won the DEL2 title. On December 21, 2017, the Löwen Frankfurt organization announced not to extend Chernomaz' contract which expired in April 2018 and to relieve him of his duties with immediate effect to hand over the job to Franz-David Fritzmeier. At that moment, the Löwen team was sitting in second place in the DEL2 standings. In April 2018, Chernomaz was announced as the head coach of the Nottingham Panthers, replacing the outgoing Corey Neilson. Chernomaz was sacked by the Panthers on 16 January 2019. The Nottingham team was third in the Elite League at the time, but had lost four games in a row. On 5 February 2019, he took over the head coaching position with the Ravensburg Towerstars of the German DEL2 league. Chernomaz guided the Towerstars to their second-ever DEL2 championship title, overcoming his former team Frankfurt in the finals in April 2019. He departed Ravensburg in February 2021.

Chernomaz is a part owner of the Alberni Valley Bulldogs, a junior team in the British Columbia Hockey League that he bought a share of in 2003.

== Career statistics ==
=== Regular season and playoffs ===
			Regular season					Playoffs
Season	Team	League	GP	G	A	Pts	PIM	GP	G	A	Pts	PIM
1979–80	Saskatoon Olympics	SJHL	51	33	37	70	75	—	—	—	—	—
1979–80	Saskatoon Blades	WHL	25	9	10	19	33	—	—	—	—	—
1980–81	Victoria Cougars	WHL	72	49	64	113	92	15	11	15	26	38
1980–81	Victoria Cougars	M-Cup	—	—	—	—	—	4	0	1	1	6
1981–82	Victoria Cougars	WHL	49	36	62	98	69	4	1	2	3	13
1981–82	Colorado Rockies	NHL	2	0	0	0	0	—	—	—	—	—
1982–83	Victoria Cougars	WHL	64	71	53	124	113	12	10	5	15	18
1983–84	New Jersey Devils	NHL	7	2	1	3	2	—	—	—	—	—
1983–84	Maine Mariners	AHL	69	17	29	46	39	2	0	1	1	0
1984–85	New Jersey Devils	NHL	3	0	2	2	2	—	—	—	—	—
1984–85	Maine Mariners	AHL	64	17	34	51	64	10	2	2	4	4
1985–86	Maine Mariners	AHL	78	21	28	49	82	5	0	0	0	2
1986–87	New Jersey Devils	NHL	25	6	4	10	8	—	—	—	—	—
1986–87	Maine Mariners	AHL	58	35	27	62	65	—	—	—	—	—
1987–88	Calgary Flames	NHL	2	1	0	1	0	—	—	—	—	—
1987–88	Salt Lake Golden Eagles	IHL	73	48	47	95	122	18	4	14	18	30
1988–89	Calgary Flames	NHL	1	0	0	0	0	—	—	—	—	—
1988–89	Salt Lake Golden Eagles	IHL	81	33	68	101	122	14	7	5	12	47
1989–90	Salt Lake Golden Eagles	IHL	65	39	35	74	170	11	6	6	12	32
1990–91	Salt Lake Golden Eagles	IHL	81	39	58	97	213	4	3	1	4	8
1991–92	Calgary Flames	NHL	11	0	0	0	6	—	—	—	—	—
1991–92	Salt Lake Golden Eagles	IHL	66	20	50	60	201	5	1	2	3	10
1992–93	Salt Lake Golden Eagles	IHL	76	26	48	74	172	—	—	—	—	—
1993–94	St. John's Maple Leafs	AHL	78	45	65	110	199	11	5	11	16	18
1994–95	St. John's Maple Leafs	AHL	77	24	45	69	235	5	1	1	2	8
1995–96	SERC Wild Wings	DEL	49	24	43	67	105	2	1	1	2	24
1996–97	SERC Wild Wings	DEL	47	25	39	64	126	5	3	5	8	8
1997–98	SERC Wild Wings	DEL	45	13	32	45	103	7	0	6	6	53
1998–99	SERC Wild Wings	DEL	43	9	38	47	177	—	—	—	—	—
1998–99	SC Bern	NLA	—	—	—	—	—	1	0	0	0	2
NHL totals			51	9	7	16	18	—	—	—	—	—
AHL totals			424	159	228	387	684	33	8	15	23	32
IHL totals			443	205	296	501	986	52	21	28	49	127

=== International ===
Year	Team	Event	GP	G	A	Pts	PIM
1995	Canada	WC	8	0	3	3	10

== Awards and honours ==
Medal record

Men's ice hockey

Representing Canada

World Championships
Bronze medal – third place	1995 Sweden	

Career
Award	Year	Ref.
WHL First All-Star Team	1982–83	
IHL Second All-Star Team	1987–88; 1990–91	
AHL First All-Star Team	1993–94	
Les Cunningham Award; AHL Most Valuable Player	1993–94	
