= Richard F. Canning =

Richard Francis Canning (April 29, 1912 – August 6, 1990) was an American attorney who was the president of the American Hockey League from 1957 to 1961.

== Legal career ==
Canning was born on April 29, 1912 in Providence, Rhode Island to Joseph P. and Mary V. Canning. He graduated from Brown University in 1932 and Harvard Law School in 1935. He was admitted to the Rhode Island bar in 1935 and practiced with Letts & Quinn and its successor firms, Letts, Quinn, & Licht and Licht & Semonoff. He also served as the city solicitor of Cranston, Rhode Island.

== American Hockey League ==
In 1945, Canning became the legal counsel for the Rhode Island Auditorium. In this role, Canning was also involved with the AHL's Providence Reds. In 1952, Reds owner Louis Pieri resigned as club president following a dispute with American Hockey League president Maurice Podoloff. Canning succeeded him as team president and took his seat on the league's board of directors.

Canning was elected vice president of the AHL in 1954 and was promoted to executive vice president three years later. On October 7, 1957, Canning was elected president of the American Hockey League, a position he held until 1961, when he resigned to focus on his law practice.

He returned to the role as governor for the Reds and in 1974 became the AHL's as vice president and general counsel. In 1972, Canning received the James C. Hendy Memorial Award, which is given annually to an executive who has made the most outstanding contribution to the American Hockey League. In 1990, the league honored Canning with the Richard F. Canning Trophy, which is awarded to the Eastern Conference playoff champions.

Canning died on August 6, 1990, in Providence. He was 78 years old.
