= 2003–04 AHL season =

- League: American Hockey League
- Sport: Ice hockey

Regular season
- Macgregor Kilpatrick Trophy: Milwaukee Admirals
- Season MVP: Jason LaBarbera
- Top scorer: Pavel Rosa

Playoffs
- Playoffs MVP: Wade Flaherty

Calder Cup
- Champions: Milwaukee Admirals
- Runners-up: Wilkes-Barre/Scranton Penguins

AHL seasons
- 2002–03 2004–05

The 2003–04 AHL season was the 68th season of the American Hockey League. The league introduced the Willie Marshall Award in honor of the career points leader in the AHL, and awards it to the annual top goal scorer.

The AHL switched from a six division alignment to four divisions within two conferences. The Eastern conference consisted of the Atlantic and East divisions, and the Western conference consisted of the North and West divisions. Twenty-eight teams played 80 games each in the schedule. The Milwaukee Admirals finished first overall in the regular season, and won the Calder Cup, defeating the Wilkes-Barre/Scranton Penguins in the finals.

== Team changes ==
- The Saint John Flames suspend operations, becoming dormant.
- The Hamilton Bulldogs and Quebec Citadelles merger dissolves, remaining as a Montreal Canadiens affiliate.
- The Edmonton Oilers affiliation resumed operations as the Toronto Roadrunners, based in Toronto, Ontario, playing in the North division.
- All teams playing in the 2002-03 North Division (Lowell Lock Monsters, Manchester Monarchs, Portland Pirates, Providence Bruins and Worcester IceCats) play in the new Atlantic Division.
- The Hartford Wolf Pack and Springfield Falcons switch from the 2002-03 East Division to the new Atlantic Division.
- All teams playing in the 2002-03 South Division (Hershey Bears, Norfolk Admirals, Philadelphia Phantoms and Wilkes-Barre/Scranton Penguins) play in the new East Division.
- The Albany River Rats, Binghamton Senators and Bridgeport Sound Tigers continue to play in the (new) East Division.
- The Hamilton Bulldogs, Manitoba Moose and St. John's Maple Leafs switch from the Canadian Division to the new North Division.
- The Cleveland Barons, Rochester Americans and Syracuse Crunch switch from the Central Division to the new North Division.
- All teams playing in the 2002-03 West Division (Chicago Wolves, Houston Aeros, Milwaukee Admirals, San Antonio Rampage and Utah Grizzlies) continue to play in the West Division.
- The Cincinnati Mighty Ducks and Grand Rapids Griffins switch from the Central Division to the new West Division.

== Final standings ==
- y– indicates team clinched division and a playoff spot
- x– indicates team clinched a playoff spot
- e– indicates team was eliminated from playoff contention

=== Eastern Conference ===
Atlantic Division	GP	W	L	T	OTL	Pts	GF	GA
y–Hartford Wolf Pack (NYR)	80	44	22	12	2	102	198	153
x–Manchester Monarchs (LAK)	80	40	28	7	5	92	223	181
x–Worcester Ice Cats (STL)	80	37	27	13	3	90	207	186
x–Providence Bruins (BOS)	80	36	29	11	4	87	170	170
x–Portland Pirates (WSH)	80	32	27	13	8	85	156	160
e–Lowell Lock Monsters (CGY/CAR)	80	32	36	6	6	76	208	242
e–Springfield Falcons (PHX)	80	26	43	9	2	63	179	234

East Division	GP	W	L	T	OTL	Pts	GF	GA
y–Philadelphia Phantoms (PHI)	80	46	25	7	2	101	216	168
x–Bridgeport Sound Tigers (NYI)	80	41	23	12	4	98	178	140
x–Wilkes-Barre/Scranton Penguins (PIT)	80	34	28	10	8	86	197	197
x–Binghamton Senators (OTT)	80	34	34	9	3	80	210	216
x–Norfolk Admirals (CHI)	80	35	36	4	5	79	172	187
e–Hershey Bears (COL/TBL)	80	33	34	8	5	79	203	218
e–Albany River Rats (NJD)	80	21	39	11	9	62	182	257

=== Western Conference ===
North Division	GP	W	L	T	OTL	Pts	GF	GA
y–Hamilton Bulldogs (MTL)	80	41	25	10	4	96	235	191
x–Syracuse Crunch (CBJ)	80	38	25	10	7	93	239	235
x–Rochester Americans (BUF)	80	37	28	10	5	89	207	188
x–Cleveland Barons (SJS)	80	37	28	8	7	89	235	220
x–Toronto Roadrunners (EDM)	80	35	34	8	3	81	219	224
e–Manitoba Moose (VAN)	80	32	35	11	2	77	214	232
e–St. John's Maple Leafs (TOR)	80	32	36	8	4	76	225	265

West Division	GP	W	L	T	OTL	Pts	GF	GA
y–Milwaukee Admirals (NSH)	80	46	24	7	3	102	269	191
x–Grand Rapids Griffins (DET)	80	44	28	8	0	96	195	166
x–Chicago Wolves (ATL)	80	42	26	9	3	96	246	208
x–Houston Aeros (MIN)	80	28	34	14	4	74	197	220
x–Cincinnati Mighty Ducks (ANA)	80	29	37	13	1	72	188	211
e–San Antonio Rampage (FLA)	80	30	42	8	0	68	191	231
e–Utah Grizzlies (DAL)	80	27	42	6	5	65	162	230

== Scoring leaders ==
Note: GP = Games played; G = Goals; A = Assists; Pts = Points; PIM = Penalty minutes

Player	Team	GP	G	A	Pts	PIM
Pavel Rosa	Manchester Monarchs	77	39	49	88	32
Domenic Pittis	Rochester Americans	75	20	57	77	137
Miroslav Zalesak	Cleveland Barons	72	35	40	75	80
Eric Perrin	Hershey Bears	71	21	54	75	49
Kirby Law	Philadelphia Phantoms	74	32	41	73	139
Brad Boyes	Cleveland Barons/Providence Bruins	78	31	41	72	51
Steve Kelly	Manchester Monarchs	59	21	49	70	117
Craig Darby	Albany River Rats	77	21	48	69	44
Jeff Hamilton	Bridgeport Sound Tigers	67	43	25	68	26
Donald MacLean	Syracuse Crunch	77	27	41	68	45

== Calder Cup Playoffs ==
Qualification
A4	Providence Bruins	0
A5	Portland Pirates	2

Qualification
E4	Binghamton Senators	0
E5	Norfolk Admirals	2

Qualification
W4	Houston Aeros	0
W5	Cincinnati Mighty Ducks	2

Qualification
N4	Cleveland Barons	2
N5	Toronto Roadrunners	1

Division Semi-finals	Division Finals
A1	Hartford	4
A5	Portland	1
A1	Hartford	4
A3	Worcester	0
A3	Worcester	4
A2	Manchester	2
Eastern
E1	Philadelphia	4
E5	Norfolk	2
E1	Philadelphia	2
E3	Wilkes-Barre/Scranton	4
E3	Wilkes-Barre/Scranton	4
E2	Bridgeport Sound	3
N1	Hamilton	4
N4	Cleveland	2
N1	Hamilton	0
N3	Rochester	4
N3	Rochester	4
N2	Syracuse Crunch	3
Western
W1	Milwaukee	4
W5	Cincinnati	3
W1	Milwaukee	4
W3	Chicago	2
W3	Chicago	4
W2	Grand Rapids	0

Conference Finals
A1	Hartford	3
E3	Wilkes-Barre/Scranton	4
N3	Rochester	1
W1	Milwaukee	4

Calder Cup Finals
E3	Wilkes-Barre/Scranton	0
W1	Milwaukee	4

== All Star Classic ==
The 17th AHL All-Star Classic was played on February 9, 2004, at the Van Andel Arena in Grand Rapids, Michigan. Team Canada defeated team PlanetUSA 9–5. In the skills competition held the night before, team PlanetUSA defeated team Canada 18–9.

== Trophy and award winners ==
=== Team awards ===
Calder Cup; Playoff champions:	Milwaukee Admirals
Richard F. Canning Trophy; Eastern Conference playoff champions:	Wilkes-Barre/Scranton Penguins
Robert W. Clarke Trophy; Western Conference playoff champions:	Milwaukee Admirals
Macgregor Kilpatrick Trophy; Regular season champions, League:	Milwaukee Admirals
Frank Mathers Trophy; Regular Season champions, Eastern Conference:	Hartford Wolf Pack
Norman R. "Bud" Poile Trophy; Regular Season champions, Western Conference:	Milwaukee Admirals
Emile Francis Trophy; Regular Season champions, Atlantic Division:	Hartford Wolf Pack
F. G. "Teddy" Oke Trophy; Regular Season champions, East Division:	Philadelphia Phantoms
Sam Pollock Trophy; Regular Season champions, North Division:	Hamilton Bulldogs
John D. Chick Trophy; Regular Season champions, West Division:	Milwaukee Admirals

=== Individual awards ===
Les Cunningham Award; Most valuable player:	Jason LaBarbera - Hartford Wolf Pack
John B. Sollenberger Trophy; Top point scorer:	Pavel Rosa - Manchester Monarchs
Willie Marshall Award; Top goal scorer:	Jeff Hamilton - Bridgeport Sound Tigers
Dudley "Red" Garrett Memorial Award; Rookie of the year:	Wade Dubielewicz - Bridgeport Sound Tigers
Eddie Shore Award; Defenceman of the year:	Curtis Murphy - Milwaukee Admirals
Aldege "Baz" Bastien Memorial Award; Best Goaltender:	Jason LaBarbera - Hartford Wolf Pack
Harry "Hap" Holmes Memorial Award; Lowest Goals Against Average:	Wade Dubielewicz & Dieter Kochan - Bridgeport Sound Tigers
Louis A. R. Pieri Memorial Award; Coach of the year:	Claude Noel - Milwaukee Admirals
Fred T. Hunt Memorial Award; Sportsmanship / Perseverance:	Ken Gernander - Hartford Wolf Pack
Yanick Dupre Memorial Award; Community Service Award:	Kurtis Foster - Chicago Wolves
Jack A. Butterfield Trophy; MVP of the playoffs:	Wade Flaherty - Milwaukee Admirals

=== Other awards ===
James C. Hendy Memorial Award; Most outstanding executive:	Jeff Eisenberg, Manchester Monarchs
Thomas Ebright Memorial Award; Career contributions:	Roy Boe & Jack Kelley
James H. Ellery Memorial Awards; Outstanding media coverage:	Mike Fornabaio, Bridgeport, (newspaper); John Walton, Hershey, (radio); Comcast Cable, Chicago, (television)
Ken McKenzie Award; Outstanding marketing executive:	Chris Schwartz, St. John's Maple Leafs
Michael Condon Memorial Award; Outstanding service, on-ice official:	Dan Murphy

== See also ==
- List of AHL seasons

Preceded by 2002–03 AHL season	AHL seasons	Succeeded by 2004–05 AHL season
