= 2009–10 AHL season =

- League: American Hockey League
- Sport: Ice hockey
- Duration: October 2, 2009 - April 11, 2010

Regular season
- Macgregor Kilpatrick Trophy: Hershey Bears
- Season MVP: Keith Aucoin
- Top scorer: Keith Aucoin

Playoffs
- Playoffs MVP: Chris Bourque

Calder Cup
- Champions: Hershey Bears
- Runners-up: Texas Stars

AHL seasons
- 2008–09 2010–11

The 2009–10 AHL season was the 74th season of the American Hockey League. Twenty-nine teams played 80 regular-season games each from October 2 to April 11. This season featured the addition of one new team, the relocation of two others, and the involuntary suspension of another.

== League business ==
=== European pre-season openers ===
On June 11, 2009, both the Hamilton Bulldogs and the Toronto Marlies were invited to participate in a four-team preseason tournament in Edinburgh, Scotland, to celebrate Scotland's contribution to the game of ice hockey.

The Edinburgh Capitals, Scotland's only Elite Ice Hockey team, hosted the tournament from September 24–27. The Bulldogs and Marlies played the Capitals and the Belfast Giants in order to win the Gardiner Cup. Hamilton defeated Toronto in the final.

=== Playoff format ===
The top four teams from each division played for the Calder Cup. The league's rules included one exception: if the fifth-place team in the Atlantic Division finishes better than the fourth-place team in the East Division, they assume the fourth playoff spot in the East Division. The Atlantic Division's Bridgeport Sound Tigers qualified for the playoffs under this provision.

== Team and NHL affiliation changes ==
=== Team changes ===
On April 28, 2009, it was announced that two teams would be relocated for the 2009–10 season and one expansion team would join:

- Quad City Flames would move to Abbotsford, BC due to poor ticket sales. They became the Abbotsford Heat.
- Philadelphia Phantoms would relocate to Glens Falls, NY due to the Wachovia Spectrum being demolished fall of 2009. They became the Adirondack Phantoms.
- Texas Stars joined the league with a limited membership and will be operated by the Dallas Stars. The limited membership is conditioned on the completed purchase of an existing AHL franchise within one year.
- Iowa Chops involuntarily suspended operations on July 7, 2009, by the AHL Board of Governors for the 2009-10 season for being "unable to remedy certain violations of the provisions of the league's Constitution and By-Laws" .

=== Affiliation changes ===
AHL team	new affiliate	old affiliate
Texas Stars	DAL	None

== Final standings ==
- y– indicates team clinched division and a playoff spot
- x– indicates team clinched a playoff spot
- e– indicates team was eliminated from playoff contention

=== Eastern Conference ===
Atlantic Division	GP	W	L	OTL	SOL	Pts	GF	GA
y–Worcester Sharks (SJS)	80	49	25	3	3	104	275	239
x–Portland Pirates (BUF)	80	45	24	7	4	101	244	214
x–Manchester Monarchs (LAK)	80	43	28	3	6	95	213	200
x–Lowell Devils (NJD)	80	39	31	4	6	88	239	232
x–Bridgeport Sound Tigers (NYI)	80	38	32	4	6	86	201	220
e–Hartford Wolf Pack (NYR)	80	36	33	6	5	83	231	251
e–Providence Bruins (BOS)	80	36	38	5	1	78	207	226
e–Springfield Falcons (EDM)	80	25	39	12	4	66	207	296

East Division	GP	W	L	OTL	SOL	Pts	GF	GA
y–Hershey Bears (WSH)	80	60	17	0	3	123	342	198
x–Albany River Rats (CAR)	80	43	29	3	5	94	244	231
x–Wilkes-Barre/Scranton Penguins (PIT)	80	41	34	2	3	87	239	229
e–Norfolk Admirals (TBL)	80	39	35	3	3	84	208	214
e–Binghamton Senators (OTT)	80	36	35	6	3	81	251	260
e–Syracuse Crunch (CBJ)	80	34	39	4	3	75	227	272
e–Adirondack Phantoms (PHI)	80	32	41	3	4	71	199	251

=== Western Conference ===
North Division	GP	W	L	OTL	SOL	Pts	GF	GA
y–Hamilton Bulldogs (MTL)	80	52	17	3	8	115	271	182
x–Rochester Americans (FLA)	80	44	33	2	1	91	253	247
x–Abbotsford Heat (CGY)	80	39	29	5	7	90	217	231
x–Manitoba Moose (VAN)	80	40	33	5	2	87	204	232
e–Toronto Marlies (TOR)	80	33	35	6	6	78	193	261
e–Lake Erie Monsters (COL)	80	34	37	1	8	77	234	257
e–Grand Rapids Griffins (DET)	80	34	39	3	4	75	244	265

West Division	GP	W	L	OTL	SOL	Pts	GF	GA
y–Chicago Wolves (ATL)	80	49	24	1	6	105	264	214
x–Texas Stars (DAL)	80	46	27	3	4	99	238	198
x–Rockford IceHogs (CHI)	80	44	30	3	3	94	226	226
x–Milwaukee Admirals (NSH)	80	41	30	2	7	91	237	220
e–Peoria Rivermen (STL)	80	38	33	2	7	85	233	248
e–San Antonio Rampage (PHX)	80	36	32	5	7	84	235	244
e–Houston Aeros (MIN)	80	34	34	7	5	80	206	224

== Statistical leaders ==
=== Leading skaters ===
The following players led the league in points at the conclusion of the regular season.

GP = Games played; G = Goals; A = Assists; Pts = Points; +/– = P Plus–minus; PIM = Penalty minutes

Player	Team	GP	G	A	Pts	+/–	PIM
Keith Aucoin	Hershey Bears	72	35	71	106	+27	49
Alexandre Giroux	Hershey Bears	69	50	53	103	+32	34
Corey Locke	Hartford Wolf Pack	76	31	54	85	-5	44
Jerome Samson	Albany River Rats	74	37	41	78	+8	66
David Desharnais	Hamilton Bulldogs	60	27	51	78	+30	34
Brock Trotter	Hamilton Bulldogs	75	36	41	77	+33	56
Jason Krog	Chicago Wolves	78	14	61	75	+17	34
Mark Mancari	Portland Pirates	74	28	46	74	+16	55
Charles Linglet^{†}	Springfield Falcons	75	19	55	74	0	36
Martin St. Pierre	Binghamton Senators	77	24	48	72	-24	50

^† = No longer with listed team

=== Leading goaltenders ===
The following goaltenders with a minimum 1560 minutes played led the league in goals against average at the end of the regular season.

GP = Games played; TOI = Time on ice (in minutes); SA = Shots against; GA = Goals against; SO = Shutouts; GAA = Goals against average; SV% = Save percentage; W = Wins; L = Losses; OT = Overtime/shootout loss

Player	Team	GP	TOI	SA	GA	SO	GAA	SV%	W	L	OT
Cedrick Desjardins	Hamilton Bulldogs	47	2576	1067	86	6	2.00	0.919	29	9	4
Jonathan Bernier	Manchester Monarchs	58	3424	1823	116	9	2.03	0.936	30	21	6
Curtis Sanford	Hamilton Bulldogs	41	2230	935	79	4	2.13	0.916	23	11	3
Braden Holtby	Hershey Bears	37	2146	1000	83	2	2.32	0.917	25	8	2
Mark Dekanich	Milwaukee Admirals	49	2804	1266	109	4	2.33	0.914	27	16	4

== Calder Cup playoffs ==
=== Bracket ===
Division Semifinals	Division Finals
E1	Hershey	4
A5	Bridgeport	1
E1	Hershey	4
East Division
E2	Albany	0
E2	Albany	4
E3	Wilkes-Barre/Scranton	0
Eastern Conference
A1	Worcester	4
A4	Lowell	1
A1	Worcester	2
Atlantic Division
A3	Manchester	4
A2	Portland	0
A3	Manchester	4
N1	Hamilton	4
N4	Manitoba	2
N1	Hamilton	4
North Division
N3	Abbotsford	2
N2	Rochester	3
N3	Abbotsford	4
Western Conference
W1	Chicago	4
W4	Milwaukee	3
W1	Chicago	3
West Division
W2	Texas	4
W2	Texas	4
W3	Rockford	0

Conference Finals
E1	Hershey	4
A3	Manchester	2
N1	Hamilton	3
W2	Texas	4

Calder Cup Final
E1	Hershey	4
W2	Texas	2

== AHL awards ==
Calder Cup : Hershey Bears
Les Cunningham Award : Keith Aucoin, Hershey
John B. Sollenberger Trophy : Keith Aucoin, Hershey
Willie Marshall Award : Alexandre Giroux, Hershey
Dudley "Red" Garrett Memorial Award : Tyler Ennis, Portland
Eddie Shore Award : Danny Groulx, Worcester
Aldege "Baz" Bastien Memorial Award : Jonathan Bernier, Manchester
Harry "Hap" Holmes Memorial Award : Cedrick Desjardins & Curtis Sanford, Hamilton
Louis A. R. Pieri Memorial Award : Guy Boucher, Hamilton
Fred T. Hunt Memorial Award : Casey Borer, Albany
Yanick Dupre Memorial Award : Josh Tordjman, San Antonio
Jack A. Butterfield Trophy : Chris Bourque, Hershey
Richard F. Canning Trophy : Hershey Bears
Robert W. Clarke Trophy : Texas Stars
Macgregor Kilpatrick Trophy: Hershey Bears
Frank Mathers Trophy: Hershey Bears
Norman R. "Bud" Poile Trophy: Hamilton Bulldogs
Emile Francis Trophy : Worcester Sharks
F. G. "Teddy" Oke Trophy: Hershey Bears
Sam Pollock Trophy: Hamilton Bulldogs
John D. Chick Trophy: Chicago Wolves
James C. Hendy Memorial Award: Howard Dolgon, Syracuse
Thomas Ebright Memorial Award: Tom Mitchell, Binghamton
James H. Ellery Memorial Awards: Pete Dougherty, Albany
Ken McKenzie Award: Jim Sarosy, Syracuse
Michael Condon Memorial Award: David Butova

== See also ==
- List of AHL seasons
- 2009 in ice hockey
- 2010 in ice hockey

Preceded by 2008–09 AHL season	AHL seasons	Succeeded by 2010–11 AHL season
