= Jeff Eisenberg =

American businessman and former hockey executive (born 1956)

- Born: June 27, 1956 (age 69); Memphis, TN, USA
- Occupation: Marketing executive

Jeff Eisenberg (born June 27, 1956) is an American businessman and former ice hockey executive. He is currently the president of Eisenberg, Vital & Ryze Advertising of Manchester, New Hampshire.

Eisenberg got his start in as a professional manager in sports in baseball, as the general assistant manager of the Holyoke Millers in 1980. He was the president of the Portland Pirates of the American Hockey League (AHL) from 1998 to 2000. Prior to the 2000–01 season, he was hired as president of the AHL's Manchester Monarchs as the team's first employee, staying in that position until 2010 when he was succeeded by Darren Abbott.

== Awards and honours ==
Award	Year
James C. Hendy Memorial Award - AHL Executive of the Year	2003–04
New Hampshire Legends of Hockey - Inductee	2010
