= Nathan Dempsey =

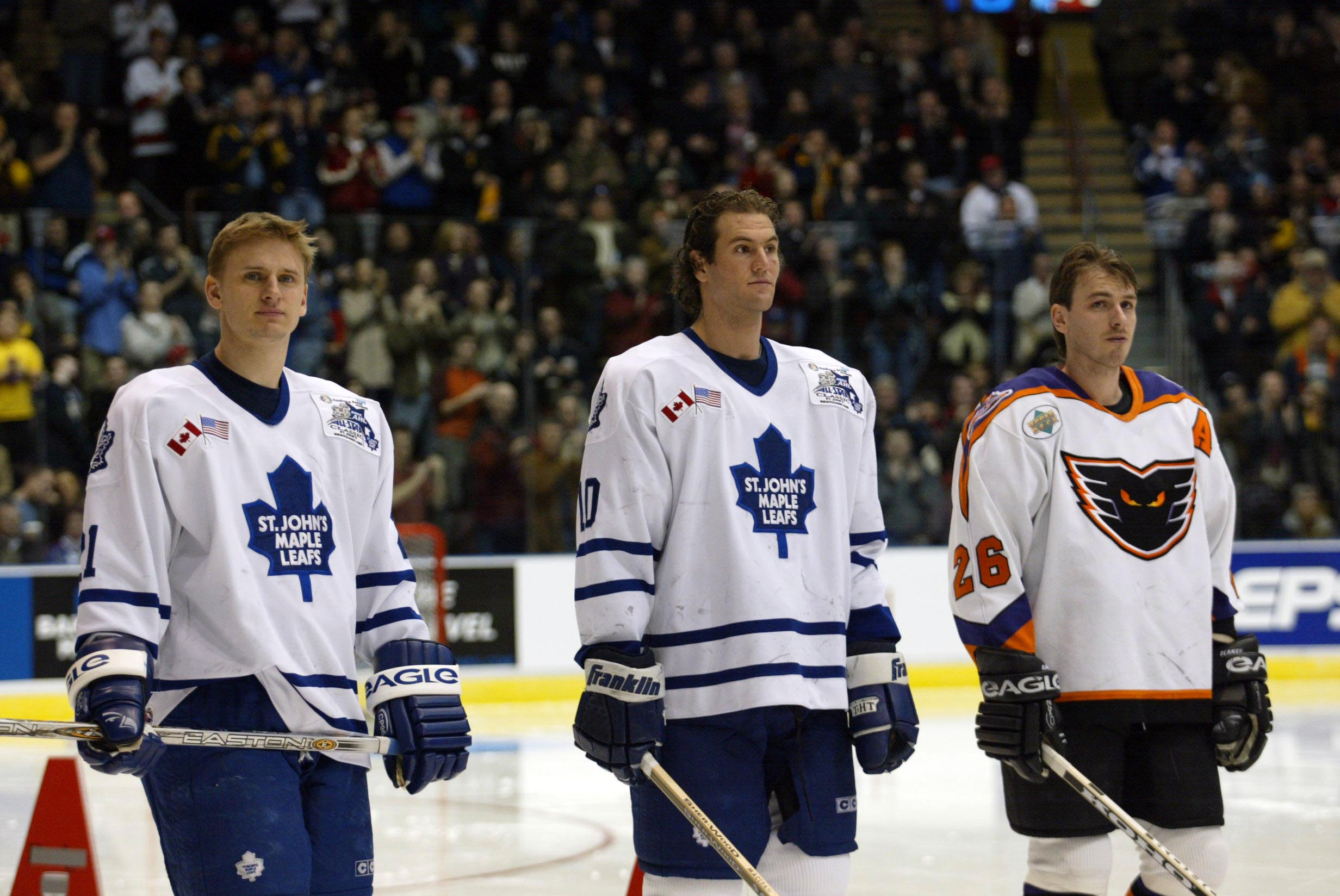
- Born: July 14, 1974 (age 52) Spruce Grove, Alberta, Canada
- Height: 6 ft 0 in (183 cm)
- Weight: 190 lb (86 kg; 13 st 8 lb)
- Position: Defence
- Shot: Right
- Played for: Toronto Maple Leafs; Chicago Blackhawks; Los Angeles Kings; Boston Bruins; Eisbären Berlin; SC Bern
- NHL draft: 245th overall, 1992; Toronto Maple Leafs
- Playing career: 1994–2008

Nathan Dempsey (born July 14, 1974) is a Canadian former professional ice hockey defenceman. He played 260 games in the National Hockey League with the Toronto Maple Leafs, Chicago Blackhawks, Los Angeles Kings and the Boston Bruins.

== Playing career ==
Nathan Dempsey was selected in the 11th round, 245th overall, in the 1992 NHL entry draft by the Toronto Maple Leafs from the WHL's Regina Pats.

Dempsey spent the majority of his 9-year tenure with the Leafs with their AHL affiliate, the St. John's Maple Leafs. His most successful season came in the 2001–02 season where he scored 61 points in 75 games for St. John's. Dempsey had only played 48 games for Toronto when he left as a free agent on July 12, 2002, signing with the Chicago Blackhawks.

He established himself as an NHL regular in the Blackhawks blueline in the 2003–04 season and on March 2, 2004, he was traded from the Blackhawks to the Los Angeles Kings for a 4th round draft selection (Nathan Davis) in 2005 and future considerations.

Dempsey spent the 2004 NHL lockout with German team Eisbären Berlin of the DEL, before returning to the Kings for the 2005–06 season.

He joined his fourth NHL team on August 7, 2006, when he signed with the Boston Bruins. He spent the majority of the year in the minors with AHL affiliate the Providence Bruins.

On July 10, 2007, Dempsey signed with Swiss team, SC Bern of the NLA for his last professional season.

== Personal life ==
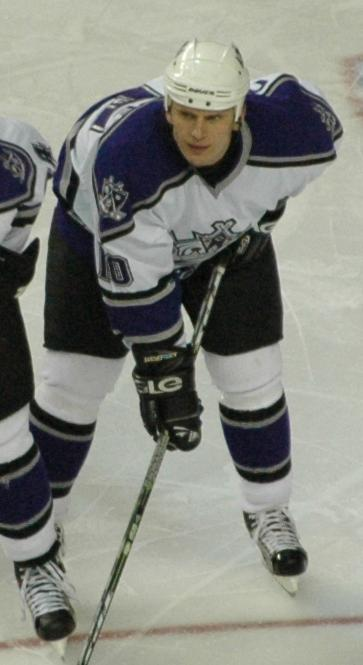
Dempsey during his tenure with the Kings.

At age 37, Dempsey was diagnosed with Parkinson's disease. He still plays hockey, coaches and works at Edmonton's Vimy Ridge Hockey Academy.

== Career statistics ==
			Regular season					Playoffs
Season	Team	League	GP	G	A	Pts	PIM	GP	G	A	Pts	PIM
1991–92	Regina Pats	WHL	70	4	22	26	72	—	—	—	—	—
1992–93	Regina Pats	WHL	72	12	29	41	95	13	3	8	11	14
1992–93	St. John's Maple Leafs	AHL	—	—	—	—	—	2	0	0	0	0
1993–94	Regina Pats	WHL	56	14	36	50	100	4	0	0	0	4
1994–95	St. John's Maple Leafs	AHL	74	7	30	37	91	5	1	0	1	11
1995–96	St. John's Maple Leafs	AHL	73	5	15	20	103	4	1	0	1	9
1996–97	St. John's Maple Leafs	AHL	52	8	18	26	108	6	1	0	1	4
1996–97	Toronto Maple Leafs	NHL	14	1	1	2	2	—	—	—	—	—
1997–98	St. John's Maple Leafs	AHL	68	12	16	28	85	4	0	0	0	0
1998–99	St. John's Maple Leafs	AHL	67	2	29	31	70	5	0	1	1	2
1999–00	St. John's Maple Leafs	AHL	44	15	12	27	40	—	—	—	—	—
1999–00	Toronto Maple Leafs	NHL	6	0	2	2	2	—	—	—	—	—
2000–01	St. John's Maple Leafs	AHL	55	11	28	39	60	4	0	4	4	8
2000–01	Toronto Maple Leafs	NHL	25	1	9	10	4	—	—	—	—	—
2001–02	St. John's Maple Leafs	AHL	75	13	48	61	66	11	1	5	6	8
2001–02	Toronto Maple Leafs	NHL	3	0	0	0	0	6	0	2	2	0
2002–03	Chicago Blackhawks	NHL	67	5	23	28	26	—	—	—	—	—
2003–04	Chicago Blackhawks	NHL	58	8	17	25	30	—	—	—	—	—
2003–04	Los Angeles Kings	NHL	17	4	3	7	2	—	—	—	—	—
2004–05	Eisbären Berlin	DEL	10	2	3	5	26	12	0	3	3	14
2005–06	Los Angeles Kings	NHL	53	2	11	13	48	—	—	—	—	—
2006–07	Boston Bruins	NHL	17	0	1	1	6	—	—	—	—	—
2006–07	Providence Bruins	AHL	46	4	17	21	40	3	0	0	0	2
2007–08	SC Bern	NLA	29	3	10	13	20	—	—	—	—	—
NHL totals			260	21	67	88	120	6	0	2	2	0

== Awards and honours ==
Award	Year
WHL
East Second All-Star Team	1993–94
AHL
All-Star Game	2001, 2002
Second All-Star Team	2002
Fred T. Hunt Memorial Award	2002
