= St. John's Maple Leafs =

Defunct American Hockey League team

- City: St. John's, Newfoundland and Labrador
- League: American Hockey League
- Operated: 1991–2005
- Home arena: Mile One Centre and Memorial Stadium
- Colours: Blue, white
- Owner: Maple Leaf Gardens Limited
- Media: CJYQ
- Affiliates: Toronto Maple Leafs (NHL)

Franchise history
- 1978–1982: New Brunswick Hawks
- 1982–1986: St. Catharines Saints
- 1986–1991: Newmarket Saints
- 1991–2005: St. John's Maple Leafs
- 2005–present: Toronto Marlies

Championships
- Regular season titles: 1 (1993–94)
- Division titles: 3 (1992–93, 1993–94, 1996–97)
- Conference titles: 1 (1991–92)
- Calder Cups: 0

The St. John's Maple Leafs were a minor ice hockey team in the American Hockey League. They played in St. John's, Newfoundland and Labrador, Canada, at Memorial Stadium from 1991 to 2001, and at Mile One Stadium from 2001 to 2005. The team was also colloquially known as the "Baby Leafs" after their parent NHL team, the Toronto Maple Leafs.

While the AHL had a strong presence in Atlantic Canada in the 1980s and 1990s, largely due to the desire of several National Hockey League Canadian franchises to continue to pay players sent down to the minors in Canadian dollars, by 2004, St. John's was the last remaining team in the region prior to its relocation to Ontario.

== History ==
The Leafs' AHL franchise was established in Moncton, New Brunswick, in 1978 as the New Brunswick Hawks, where they played until 1982. The franchise had stops in St. Catharines, Ontario, as the St. Catharines Saints (1982–1986) and Newmarket, Ontario, as the Newmarket Saints (1986–1991). The St. John's Maple Leafs were established in 1991 when the Toronto Maple Leafs moved its AHL farm team to St. John's, becoming the first professional ice hockey team in Newfoundland and Labrador.

The team initially played their home games at Memorial Stadium. The St. John's Maple Leafs played their inaugural home game on October 19, 1991, in front of a sold-out crowd, where they defeated the Fredericton Canadiens 5–3. The team made it to the Calder Cup finals in their inaugural season, losing a seven game series to the Adirondack Red Wings four-games-to-three. The Leafs were crowned division champions for the 1992–93 and 1996–97 seasons, and won the regular season title during the 1993–94 AHL season.

In 1993, municipal workers for the City of St. John's voted to strike including the city staff operating the St. John's Memorial Stadium. Prior a game in February, the Maple Leafs team arrived at the stadium on a bus, where they were met by a picket line of strikers who then surrounded the bus and began rocking it with the team and personnel on board. Local police were able to intervene, allowing the bus and Maple Leafs to escape unharmed. Following the incident, the Leafs took an extended road trip and the Toronto Maple Leafs threatened to pull the team out of the province. They remained at Memorial Stadium for ten seasons until moving to the newly built Mile One Centre in downtown St. John's in 2001.

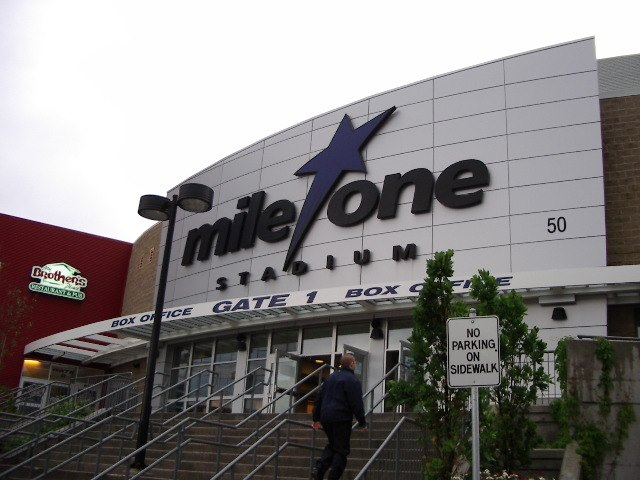
Mile One Stadium (now Mary Brown's Centre), the St. John's Maple Leafs final arena

The Maple Leafs were a successful team throughout their time in St. John's and made multiple appearances in the AHL Calder Cup playoffs (missing the playoffs in 2000, 2003, and 2004). On April 29, 2005, the Maple Leafs played their final game, losing 4–0 to the Manitoba Moose in game five of the division semifinal round of the playoffs at the MTS Centre in Winnipeg, Manitoba. The Leafs' final home game was a 6–1 victory in game two of the semifinals.

Their 2005 playoff loss marked the end of 34 consecutive seasons of AHL presence in Atlantic Canada, which began in 1971 with the Nova Scotia Voyageurs in Halifax, Nova Scotia. By 2005, the AHL's gradual withdrawal from the Atlantic left the Maple Leafs' nearest opponent as the Portland Pirates, 1,781 km (1,107 mi) away. In an effort to reduce travel costs, the parent club ultimately decided to relocate the team to Toronto for the 2005–06 season, where it became known as the Toronto Marlies.

=== Equipment manager ===
Shannon (Shaq) Coady was the original stick boy for the St. John's Maple Leafs, after winning a local contest at the age of 14. Coady became the team's equipment manager, and he remained in that role until the team's relocation to Toronto. Coady went on to work for the St. John's Fog Devils of the Quebec Major Junior Hockey League, and the American Hockey League's St. John's IceCaps. Coady was a well-known figure in NL, due to his work with the province's professional sports teams. Coady died on March 24, 2021, prompting tributes from NHL players and personnel, who had worked with Coady.

=== Mascot ===
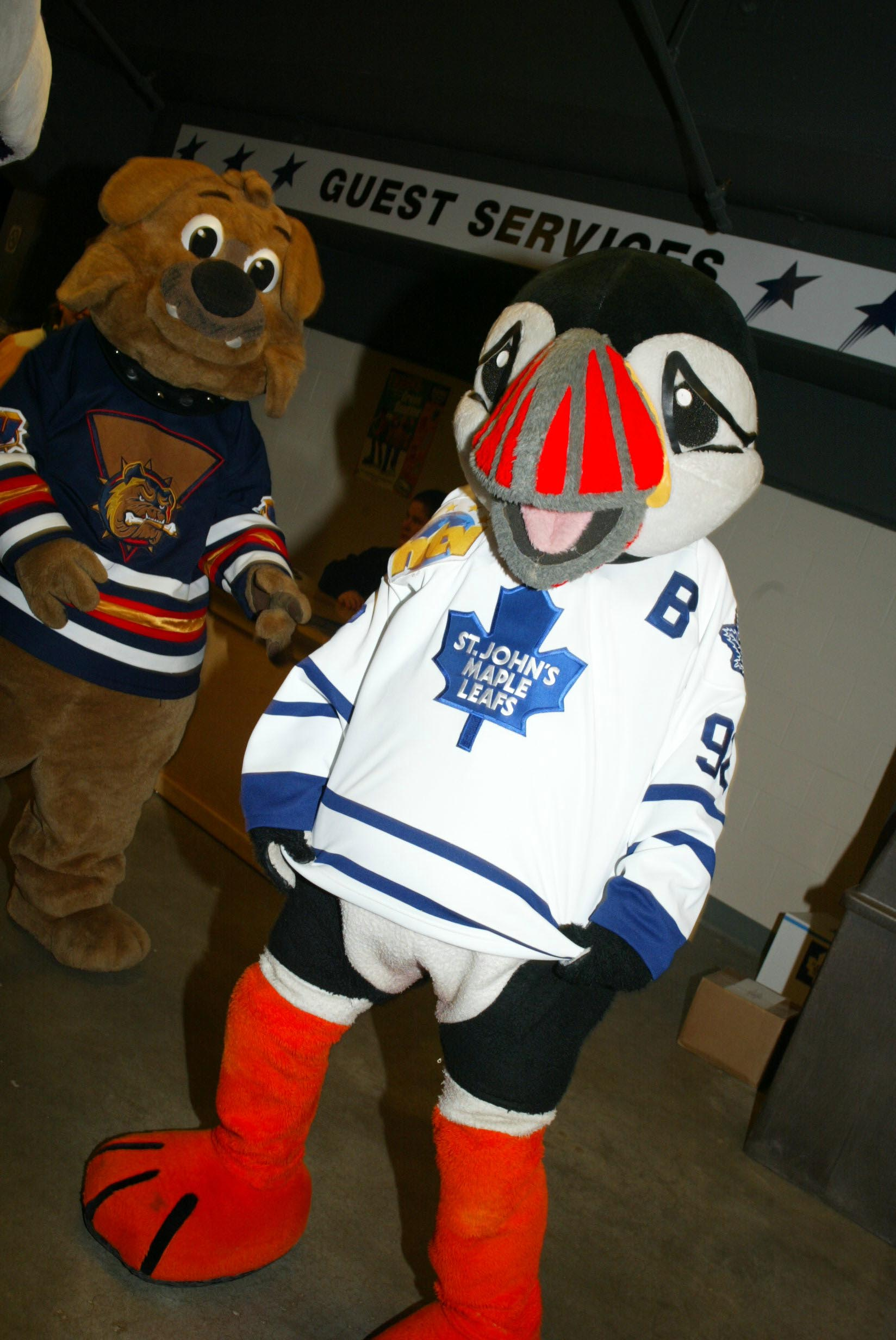
Chris Abbott, also known as "Buddy the Puffin," at a St. John's Maple Leafs game.

The St. John's Maple Leafs' team mascot was a puffin named "Buddy." Buddy wore a Maple Leafs home sweater with the number 92 to commemorate the year he was introduced. The puffin design was selected from a fan contest to create a mascot for the Leafs' second season. Buddy remained the mascot until the team's departure in 2005. Buddy was reintroduced as the mascot for the St. John's IceCaps wearing an IceCaps home sweater with his familiar number of 92. Buddy also served as the mascot for the Newfoundland Growlers of the ECHL. Chris Abbott, the man in the costume, died in St. John's on February 1, 2022.

=== Media ===
St. John's Maple Leafs games were broadcast by VOCM news radio, (and by CJYQ in later seasons) and on local television by Cable Atlantic, which was acquired by Rogers Communications in 2001. Brian Rogers was the long-time voice of the St. John's Maple Leafs, after taking over the role from George MacClaren in 1994.

=== Affiliates ===
- Toronto Maple Leafs (NHL, 1991–2005)
- Greensboro Generals (ECHL, 2002–03 season)
- Pensacola Ice Pilots (ECHL, 2004–05 season)

== Coaches ==
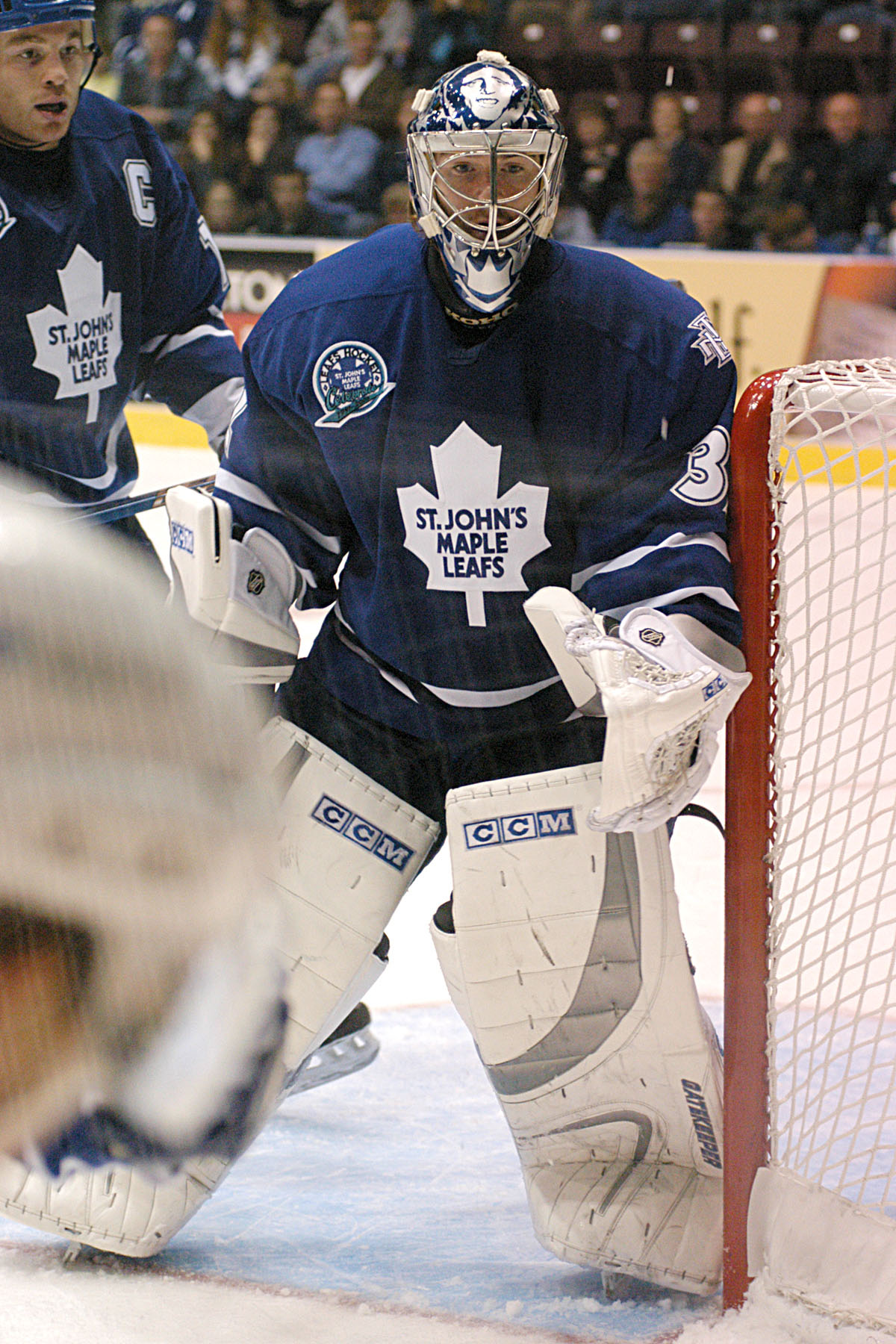
Mikael Tellqvist with the Leafs in 2004.

- Marc Crawford (1991–1994)
- Tom Watt (1994–1995)
- Mike Foligno (1995–1996)
- Mark Hunter (1996–1997)
- Al MacAdam (1997–2000)
- Lou Crawford (2000–2003)
- Doug Shedden (2003–2005)

== Notable alumni ==
- Kevyn Adams
- Jean-Sebastien Aubin
- Patrik Augusta
- Don Beaupre
- Lonny Bohonos
- Sebastien Centomo
- Rich Chernomaz
- Marcel Cousineau
- Marc Crawford
- Nathan Dempsey
- Kelly Fairchild
- Brad Leeb
- David Ling
- Donald MacLean
- Ken McRae
- Mike Minard
- Yanic Perreault
- Felix Potvin
- Joel Quenneville
- Chris Snell
- Shawn Thornton
- Jimmy Waite
- Kyle Wellwood
- Brian Wiseman
- Bob Wren

== Season-by-season results ==
=== Regular season ===
Season	Games	Won	Lost	Tied	OTL	SOL	Points	Goals for	Goals against	Standing
1991–92	80	39	29	12	—	—	90	325	285	2nd, Atlantic
1992–93	80	41	26	13	—	—	95	351	308	1st, Atlantic
1993–94	80	45	23	12	—	—	102	360	287	1st, Atlantic
1994–95	80	33	37	10	—	—	76	263	263	2nd, Atlantic
1995–96	80	31	31	14	4	—	80	248	274	3rd, Atlantic
1996–97	80	36	28	10	6	—	88	265	264	1st, Canadian
1997–98	80	25	32	18	5	—	73	233	254	4th, Atlantic
1998–99	80	34	35	7	4	—	79	246	270	2nd, Atlantic
1999–00	80	23	45	8	4	—	58	202	277	5th, Atlantic
2000–01	80	35	35	8	2	—	80	247	244	3rd, Canadian
2001–02	80	34	27	17	2	—	87	256	240	3rd, Canadian
2002–03	80	32	40	6	2	—	72	236	285	3rd, Canadian
2003–04	80	32	36	8	4	—	76	225	265	7th, North
2004–05	80	46	28	5	1	—	98	244	232	2nd, North

=== Playoffs ===
Season	Prelim	1st round	2nd round	3rd round	Finals
1991–92	—	W, 4–1, CB	W, 4–0, MON	bye	L, 3–4, ADK
1992–93	—	W, 4–1, MON	L, 0–4, CB	—	—
1993–94	—	W, 4–1, CB	L, 2–4, MON	—	—
1994–95	—	L, 1–4, FRE	—	—	—
1995–96	—	L, 1–3, SJNB	—	—	—
1996–97	—	W, 3–1, BNG	L, 3–4, HAM	—	—
1997–98	—	L, 1–3, SJNB	—	—	—
1998–99	—	L, 2–4, FRE	—	—	—
1999–00	Did not qualify				
2000–01	—	L, 1–3, QUE	—	—	—
2001–02	W, 2–0, PRO	W, 3–2, LOW	L, 0–4, BRI	—	—
2002–03	Did not qualify				
2003–04	Did not qualify				
2004–05	—	L, 1–4, MTB	—	—	—

== Team Records ==
=== Single Season ===
Goals: 53 - Patrik Augusta (1993–94)
Assists: 74 - Chris Snell (1993–94)
Points: 110 - Rich Chernomaz (1993–94)
Penalty minutes: 354 - Shawn Thornton (1998–99)
GAA (min 25 games): 2.42 - Mike Minard (2000–01)
SV% (min 25 games): .926 - Sebastien Centomo (2001–02)
Shutouts: 6 - Jimmy Waite (1999–2000)

=== Career ===
Games: 508 - Nathan Dempsey
Goals: 132 - Yanic Perreault
Assists: 196 - Nathan Dempsey
Points: 276 - Yanic Perreault
Penalty minutes: 1215 - Shawn Thornton
Goaltending wins: 80 - Marcel Cousineau
Shutouts: 7 - Jimmy Waite

== See also ==
- List of hockey teams in Newfoundland and Labrador
