= Gardiner Cup =

The Gardiner Cup was a professional ice hockey tournament that was held in Edinburgh, Scotland from September 24, 2009 until September 27, 2009. It featured two professional hockey teams from the American Hockey League and two from the Elite Ice Hockey League. The Hamilton Bulldogs were the winner in the event, defeating the Toronto Marlies in the final 3–1.

== History ==
The tournament was part of Scotland's 2009 Homecoming celebrations and was intended to honour the contribution of persons of Scottish descent to ice hockey. The tournament was named after Charlie Gardiner, professional goaltender with the Chicago Black Hawks. Gardiner was born in Edinburgh and was captain of the 1934 Black Hawks Stanley Cup championship squad.

== Team results ==
- Belfast Giants: 0 wins, 1 loss, 0 goals for, 7 goals against
- Edinburgh Capitals: 0 wins, 1 loss, 1 goal for, 6 goals against
- Hamilton Bulldogs: 3 wins, 0 losses, 11 goals for, 1 goal against
- Toronto Marlies: 1 win, 2 losses, 7 goals for, 5 goals against

The 2009 Gardiner Cup was awarded to the Hamilton Bulldogs.

== Schedule ==
All games were played at Murrayfield Ice Rink.

- September 24 - Hamilton v. Toronto: Hamilton wins 1-0.
- September 26 (Semifinal) - Edinburgh v. Toronto: Toronto wins 6-1.
- September 26 (Semifinal) - Belfast v. Hamilton: Hamilton wins 7-0.
- September 27 (Final) - Toronto v. Hamilton: Hamilton wins 3-1.
