= Ice hockey at the 1994 Winter Olympics =

1994 Winter Olympics Ice Hockey

Tournament details
- Host country: Norway
- Venue(s): Fjellhallen; Håkons Hall (in 2 host cities)
- Dates: 12–27 February
- Teams: 12

Final positions
- Champions: Sweden (1st title)
- Runners-up: Canada
- Third place: Finland
- Fourth place: Russia

Tournament statistics
- Games played: 46
- Goals scored: 308 (6.7 per game)
- Scoring leader: (Slovakia) Žigmund Pálffy (10 points)

The men's ice hockey tournament at the 1994 Winter Olympics in Lillehammer, Norway, was the 18th Olympic Championship. Sweden won its first gold medal. The tournament, held from 12 February to 27 February, was played at Fjellhallen in Gjøvik and the Håkons Hall in Lillehammer. This was the last Olympic ice hockey competition with no women's tournament as it debuted in 1998.

== Medalists ==
Event	Gold	Silver	Bronze
Men's	Sweden Håkan Algotsson; Charles Berglund; Jonas Bergqvist; Andreas Dackell; Christian Due-Boje; Niklas Eriksson; Peter Forsberg; Roger Hansson; Roger Johansson; Jörgen Jönsson; Kenny Jönsson; Tomas Jonsson; Patrik Juhlin; Patric Kjellberg; Håkan Loob; Mats Näslund; Stefan Örnskog; Leif Rohlin; Daniel Rydmark; Tommy Salo; Fredrik Stillman; Michael Sundlöv; Magnus Svensson	Canada Mark Astley; Adrian Aucoin; David Harlock; Corey Hirsch; Todd Hlushko; Greg Johnson; Fabian Joseph; Paul Kariya; Chris Kontos; Manny Legace; Ken Lovsin; Derek Mayer; Petr Nedvěd; Dwayne Norris; Greg Parks; Allain Roy; Jean-Yves Roy; Brian Savage; Brad Schlegel; Wally Schreiber; Chris Therien; Todd Warriner; Brad Werenka	Finland Mika Alatalo; Erik Hämäläinen; Raimo Helminen; Timo Jutila; Sami Kapanen; Esa Keskinen; Marko Kiprusoff; Saku Koivu; Pasi Kuivalainen; Janne Laukkanen; Tero Lehterä; Jere Lehtinen; Mikko Mäkelä; Jarmo Myllys; Mika Nieminen; Janne Ojanen; Marko Palo; Ville Peltonen; Pasi Sormunen; Mika Strömberg; Jukka Tammi; Petri Varis; Hannu Virta

== Qualification ==
The top eleven nations from the 1993 World Championships qualified directly. To fill the twelfth spot, five nations were selected to compete: The top two from Group B (Great Britain and Poland), the top nation from Group C (Latvia), the best Asian nation (Japan), and Slovakia. This was the first IIHF event for Slovakia.

Pos	Team	Pld	W	D	L	GF	GA	GD	Pts	Qualification
1	Slovakia	4	3	1	0	25	8	+17	7	1994 Winter Olympics
2	Latvia	4	3	0	1	22	14	+8	6	
3	Poland	4	1	2	1	14	16	−2	4	
4	Japan	4	1	0	3	11	22	−11	2	
5	Great Britain (H)	4	0	1	3	9	21	−12	1	

(H) Hosts

28 August 1993	Great Britain	2–2 (0–1, 0–0, 2–1)	Poland	Sheffield

29 August 1993	Slovakia	7–2 (3–1, 2–1, 2–0)	Japan	Sheffield

30 August 1993	Latvia	6–2 (3–0, 1–0, 2–2)	Poland	Sheffield

30 August 1993	Great Britain	2–4 (0–1, 1–2, 1–1)	Japan	Sheffield

1 September 1993	Slovakia	4–4 (2–0, 1–1, 1–3)	Poland	Sheffield

1 September 1993	Great Britain	4–8 (2–1, 2–4, 0–3)	Latvia	Sheffield

2 September 1993	Latvia	1–7 (1–2, 0–3, 0–2)	Slovakia	Sheffield

2 September 1993	Poland	6–4 (0–1, 5–1, 1–2)	Japan	Sheffield

4 September 1993	Japan	1–7 (0–3, 1–0, 0–4)	Latvia	Sheffield

4 September 1993	Great Britain	1–7 (0–2, 1–3, 0–2)	Slovakia	Sheffield

== Preliminary round ==
All times are local (UTC+1).

=== Group A ===
Pos	Team	Pld	W	D	L	GF	GA	GD	Pts	Qualification
1	Finland	5	5	0	0	25	4	+21	10	Quarterfinals
2	Germany	5	3	0	2	11	14	−3	6 (Note: Germany 2 points, +1 goal difference; Czech Republic 2 points, 0 goal difference; Russia 2 points, –1 goal difference.)	Quarterfinals
3	Czech Republic	5	3	0	2	16	11	+5	6	Quarterfinals
4	Russia	5	3	0	2	20	14	+6	6	Quarterfinals
5	Austria	5	1	0	4	13	28	−15	2	9–12th place semifinals
6	Norway (H)	5	0	0	5	5	19	−14	0	9–12th place semifinals

Source: Olympedia
(H) Hosts
Notes:

12 February 1994; 12:00	Finland	3–1 (2–1, 1–0, 0–0)	Czech Republic	Håkons Hall, Lillehammer; Attendance: 5,200

Jarmo Myllys
Goalies
Petr Bříza
Referee:
(United States) Rob Hearn
Linesmen:
(United States) Jay Borman
(Russia) Sergey Feofanov

Jutila (Strömberg) (PP) – 05:05	1–0
Ojanen (Varis, Palo) – 07:34	2–0
	2–1	17:26 – Kašťák (Kadlec)
Kapanen (Helminen) – 34:32	3–1

10 min
Penalties
12 min
24
Shots
14

12 February 1994; 18:30	Russia	5–1 (2–1, 1–0, 2–0)	Norway	Gjøvik Olympic Cavern Hall, Gjøvik; Attendance: 5,200

Andrei Zuev
Goalies
Robert Schistad
Referee:
(Germany) Peter Slapke
Linesmen:
(Germany) Wilhelm Schimm
(Slovakia) Miloš Benek

Gusmanov – 00:23	1–0
Berezin (Kudashov) (SH) – 03:27	2– 0
Tarasenko (Torgayev) – 23:47	3–0
	3–1	18:19 – Rath (Knutsen, Andersen)
Karpov (Yevtyukhin) (SH) – 52:36	4–1
Sorokin – 54:39	5–1

14 min
Penalties
10 min
27
Shots
18

12 February 1994; 21:00	Austria	3–4 (1–1, 0–0, 2–3)	Germany	Håkons Hall, Lillehammer; Attendance: 3,300

Brian Stankiewicz
Goalies
Klaus Merk
Referee:
(Russia) Valery Bokarev
Linesmen:
(Sweden) Stephan Eriksson
(Sweden) Johan Norrman

	0–1	04:24 – Ustorf (Hilger)
G. Pusnik (Kerth) – 13:50	1–1
Dallman – 42:02	2–1
	2–2	49:57 – Kummer (Brandl)
	2–3	50:19 – Doucet (Rumrich)
	2–4	56:19 – Brandl (Stefan) (PP)
Strong (Ulrich) – 57:31	3–4

26 min
Penalties
6 min
32
Shots
34

14 February 1994; 15:00	Germany	2–1 (1–0, 1–1, 0–0)	Norway	Håkons Hall, Lillehammer; Attendance: 9,245

Helmut de Raaf
Goalies
Jim Marthinsen
Referee:
(Czech Republic) Petr Bolina
Linesmen:
(Czech Republic) Václav Český
(Russia) Sergey Feofanov

Hegen (Benda, Amann) – 12:48	1–0
Stefan (Niederberger) – 24:49	2–0
	2–1	37:22 – Dahlstrøm (Salsten, Knutsen) (PP)

10 min
Penalties
4 min
21
Shots
22

14 February 1994; 17:30	Czech Republic	7–3 (2–2, 4–1, 1–0)	Austria	Gjøvik Olympic Cavern Hall, Gjøvik; Attendance: 4,340

Roman Turek
Goalies
Claus Dalpiaz
Referee:
(Norway) Tor Hansen
Linesmen:
(Canada) Lonnie Cameron
(France) Lionel Ollier

Kučera – 03:07	1–0
Horák – 05:44	2–0
	2–1	07:50 – Ulrich (Dallman)
	2–2	15:25 – Kerth
Žemlička (Hrbek, Ščerban) – 22:23	3–2
Horák – 23:28	4–2
Alinč – 31:48	5–2
Doležal (Kučera, Janecký) – 32:19	6–2
	6–3	35:30 – Dallman (Kerth) (SH)
Hosták (Sršeň) (SH) – 57:55	7–3

14 min
Penalties
16 min
40
Shots
25

14 February 1994; 20:00	Russia	0–5 (0–1, 0–4, 0–0)	Finland	Håkons Hall, Lillehammer; Attendance: 8,751

Andrei Zuev
Sergei Abramov
Goalies
Jukka Tammi
Referee:
(Canada) Kevin Muench
Linesmen:
(Canada) Pierre Tremblay
(United States) Jay Borman

0–1	14:59 – Lehtinen
0–2	28:59 – Koivu (Peltonen, Laukkanen)
0–3	31:32 – Alatalo
0–4	39:03 – Ojanen (Mäkelä)
0–5	39:13 – Kiprusoff (Helminen) (PP)

8 min
Penalties
16 min
11
Shots
28

16 February 1994; 15:00	Austria	1–9 (0–1, 1–7, 0–1)	Russia	Håkons Hall, Lillehammer; Attendance: 6,343

Michael Puschacher
Claus Dalpiaz
Goalies
Sergei Abramov
Referee:
(Italy) Ruggero Savaris
Linesmen:
(Norway) Erik Larssen
(Norway) John Svarstad

	0–1	15:40 – Berezin
	0–2	21:43 – Varitsky
	0–3	23:03 – Vinogradov (Denisov, Nikolishin)
	0–4	23:53 – Smirnov (Berezin, Gusmanov)
	0–5	26:29 – Davydov (Varitsky)
	0–6	26:46 – Denisov (Nikolishin, Vinogradov)
	0–7	35:52 – Vinogradov (Nikolishin) (PP)
	0–8	37:02 – Gusmanov (Berezin)
Burton (Dallman) (PP) – 39:30	1–8
	1–9	52:55 – Denisov (Nikolishin, Vinogradov)

14 min
Penalties
8 min
14
Shots
48

16 February 1994; 17:30	Czech Republic	1–0 (0–0, 0–0, 1–0)	Germany	Gjøvik Olympic Cavern Hall, Gjøvik; Attendance: 5,150

Petr Bříza	Goalies	Josef Heiß	Referee: (Sweden) Börje Johansson; Linesmen: (United States) Jay Borman (Russia) Sergey Feofanov
Kučera (Vykoukal) – 44:14 / 1–0			Referee: (Sweden) Börje Johansson; Linesmen: (United States) Jay Borman (Russia) Sergey Feofanov
8 min	Penalties	21 min	Referee: (Sweden) Börje Johansson; Linesmen: (United States) Jay Borman (Russia) Sergey Feofanov
37	Shots	18	Referee: (Sweden) Börje Johansson; Linesmen: (United States) Jay Borman (Russia) Sergey Feofanov

16 February 1994; 20:00	Norway	0–4 (0–1, 0–2, 0–1)	Finland	Håkons Hall, Lillehammer; Attendance: 9,250

Jim Marthinsen
Goalies
Jarmo Myllys
Referee:
(Austria) Karl Korentschnig
Linesmen:
(Czech Republic) Václav Český
(France) Lionel Ollier

0–1	06:46 – Varis (Palo, Jutila)
0–2	21:23 – Strömberg (Nieminen, Helminen)
0–3	36:51 – Hämäläinen (Ojanen)
0–4	48:31 – Peltonen (Laukkanen) (PP)

8 min
Penalties
8 min
11
Shots
32

18 February 1994; 15:00	Germany	4–2 (2–0, 1–1, 1–1)	Russia	Håkons Hall, Lillehammer; Attendance: 8,600

Klaus Merk
Goalies
Sergei Abramov
Referee:
(Norway) Tor Hansen
Linesmen:
(Slovakia) Miloš Benek
(Czech Republic) Václav Český

Truntschka – 07:00	1–0
Truntschka (PP) – 10:12	2–0
Stefan (Brandl) (PP) – 24:52	3–0
	3–1	35:09 – Torgayev
	3–2	41:39 – Kudashov (Sorokin)
Kummer – 44:47	4–2

12 min
Penalties
10 min
18
Shots
34

18 February 1994; 17:30	Finland	6–2 (1–0, 2–1, 3–1)	Austria	Gjøvik Olympic Cavern Hall, Gjøvik; Attendance: 4,945

Jukka Tammi
Goalies
Michael Puschacher
Referee:
(Germany) Peter Slapke
Linesmen:
(Norway) Erik Larssen
(Norway) John Svarstad

Palo (Keskinen) – 01:31	1–0
Virta (Kiprusoff, Mäkelä) (PP) − 28:55	2–0
	2–1	31:29 − Strong (Burton)
Peltonen − 37:58	3–1
Keskinen (Nieminen) − 43:24	4–1
Koivu − 48:18	5–1
	5–2	53:30 − Strong (G. Puschnik) (PP)
Helminen (Mäkelä) (PP) − 54:50	6–2

18 min
Penalties
22 min
51
Shots
12

18 February 1994; 20:00	Czech Republic	4–1 (3–0, 0–0, 1–1)	Norway	Håkons Hall, Lillehammer; Attendance: 9,245

Petr Bříza
Goalies
Jim Marthinsen
Referee:
(Italy) Ruggero Savaris
Linesmen:
(Italy) Helmuth Mair
(France) Lionel Ollier

Doležal (Janecký) – 16:47	1–0
Sršeň (Kašťák) – 17:41	2–0
Ťoupal – 19:03	3–0
	3–1	51:51 – Dahlstrøm (Magnussen, Andersen)
Kučera (ENG) – 58:53	4–1

8 min
Penalties
10 min
29
Shots
15

20 February 1994; 15:00	Russia	4–3 (2–2, 2–0, 0–1)	Czech Republic	Håkons Hall, Lillehammer; Attendance: 9,140

Andrei Zuev
Goalies
Petr Bříza
Referee:
(Canada) Kevin Muench
Linesmen:
(Sweden) Stephan Eriksson
(Sweden) Johan Norrman

Karpov – 04:42	1–0
Denisov – 05:22	2–0
	2–1	15:05 – Hrbek (PP)
	2–2	18:13 – Alinč (Kašťák)
Nikolishin (PP) – 31:12	3–2
Karpov (PP) – 39:01	4–2
	4–3	59:15 – Vykoukal (Sršeň) (EA)

12 min
Penalties
14 min
29
Shots
28

20 February 1994; 17:30	Germany	1–7 (0–3, 0–2, 1–2)	Finland	Gjøvik Olympic Cavern Hall, Gjøvik; Attendance: 5,261

Helmut de Raaf
Goalies
Jarmo Myllys
Referee:
(Russia) Valery Bokarev
Linesmen:
(France) Lionel Ollier
(Italy) Helmuth Mair

	0–1	12:51 − Lehtinen (Koivu, Peltonen) (PP)
	0–2	15:54 − Ojanen (Lehterä)
	0–3	17:23 − Nieminen (Palo)
	0–4	22:58 − Kiprusoff (Alatalo, Ojanen)
	0–5	30:29 − Mäkelä (Helminen)
Doucet (Hegen) − 41:09	1–5
	1–6	58:43 − Peltonen
	1–7	59:33 − Mäkelä (Helminen)

10 min
Penalties
10 min
14
Shots
44

20 February 1994; 20:00	Norway	2–4 (1–1, 1–1, 0–2)	Austria	Håkons Hall, Lillehammer; Attendance: 9,225

Jim Marthinsen
Goalies
Michael Puschacher
Referee:
(United States) Rob Hearn
Linesmen:
(Czech Republic) Václav Český
(Slovakia) Miloš Benek

Dahlstrøm (Kristiansen) (PP) – 9:55	1–0
	1–1	13:46 – A. Pusnik (Kromp)
	1–2	24:30 – Burton
Rath (Nørstebø) – 26:01	2–2
	2–3	48:16 – G. Pusnik (Dallman)
	2–4	50:49 – Doyle (Kerth, Dallman) (PP)

8 min
Penalties
14 min
38
Shots
19

=== Group B ===
Pos	Team	Pld	W	D	L	GF	GA	GD	Pts	Qualification
1	Slovakia	5	3	2	0	26	14	+12	8	Quarterfinals
2	Canada	5	3	1	1	17	11	+6	7 (Note: Sweden 2–3 Canada)	Quarterfinals
3	Sweden	5	3	1	1	23	13	+10	7	Quarterfinals
4	United States	5	1	3	1	21	17	+4	5	Quarterfinals
5	Italy	5	1	0	4	15	31	−16	2	9–12th place semifinals
6	France	5	0	1	4	11	27	−16	1	9–12th place semifinals

Notes:

13 February 1994; 15:00	Sweden	4–4 (2–1, 0–2, 2–1)	Slovakia	Håkons Hall, Lillehammer; Attendance: 9,213

Håkan Algotsson
Goalies
Eduard Hartmann
Referee:
(Canada) Kevin Muench
Linesmen:
(Finland) Jouni Lojander
(Italy) Helmuth Mair

Loob (Jonsson, Stillman) (PP) − 07:42	1–0
	1–1	11:51 − Jánoš (Pálffy)
Juhlin (Näslund) − 12:14	2–1
	2–2	20:11 − Šatan (Bača)
	2–3	23:29 − Šťastný (Daňo)
Hansson − 46:39	3–3
K. Jönsson − 48.57	4–3
	4–4	54:12 − Kontšek (Haščák, Kolník)

10 min
Penalties
16 min
28
Shots
21

13 February 1994; 17:30	Italy	2–7 (1–2, 0–4, 1–1)	Canada	Gjøvik Olympic Cavern Hall, Gjøvik; Attendance: 5,170

David Delfino
Mike Rosati
Goalies
Corey Hirsch
Referee:
(Sweden) Börje Johansson
Linesmen:
(Norway) John Svarstad
(Norway) Erik Larssen

	0–1	07:32 − Nedvěd (Werenka, Kariya) (PP)
De Toni − 08:16	1–1
	1–2	19:40 − Werenka (Kariya) (PP)
	1–3	21:24 − Schreiber (Mayer)
	1–4	27:43 − Hlushko (Astley)
	1–5	36:23 − Kontos (Savage)
	1–6	39:39 − Kontos (Nedvěd)
Orlando − 47:13	2–6
	2–7	54:58 − Nedvěd (Kariya)

14 min
Penalties
16 min
29
Shots
38

13 February 1994; 20:00	France	4–4 (1–2, 1–0, 2–2)	United States	Håkons Hall, Lillehammer; Attendance: 8,145

Petri Ylönen
Goalies
Mike Dunham
Referee:
(Finland) Mika Lepaus
Linesmen:
(Canada) Lonnie Cameron
(Canada) Pierre Tremblay

	0–1	05:04 − Lilley (Beaufait)
Saunier − 15:16	1–1
	1–2	17:43 − Ferraro (Johnson)
Pajonkowski − 38:10	2–2
Agnel − 42:36	3–2
Maia (Poudrier, Laporte) (SH) − 47:48	4–2
	4–3	51:23 − Laviolette
	4–4	53:58 − Rolston (Ciavaglia)

16 min
Penalties
6 min
14
Shots
32

15 February 1994; 15:00	Sweden	4–1 (1–0, 1–1, 2–0)	Italy	Håkons Hall, Lillehammer; Attendance: 8,731

Håkan Algotsson
Goalies
Bruno Campese
Referee:
(Germany) Peter Slapke
Linesmen:
(Germany) Wilhelm Schimm
(Slovakia) Miloš Benek

Due-Boje (Loob, Kjellberg) − 19:34	1–0
	1–1	24:18 − Zarrillo (Orlando) (SH)
Stillman (Loob) − 37:03	2–1
Juhlin (Berglund, Näslund) − 41:10	3–1
Svensson (Berglund) (PP) − 43:52	4–1

6 min
Penalties
10 min
39
Shots
18

15 February 1994; 17:30	United States	3–3 (1–1, 0–1, 2–1)	Slovakia	Gjøvik Olympic Cavern Hall, Gjøvik; Attendance: 5,200

Garth Snow
Goalies
Eduard Hartmann
Referee:
(Russia) Valery Bokarev
Linesmen:
(Sweden) Stephan Eriksson
(Sweden) Johan Norrman

Lazaro (Crowley) − 10:23	1–0
	1–1	13:55 − Kolník (Haščák)
	1–2	39:24 − Šťastný (Pálffy)
	1–3	46:58 − Švehla (PP)
Ciavaglia (Beaufait, Sacco) (PP) − 54:23	2–3
Lilley − 55:59	3–3

22 min
Penalties
35 min
18
Shots
33

15 February 1994; 20:00	Canada	3–1 (1–0, 2–0, 0–1)	France	Håkons Hall, Lillehammer; Attendance: 6,445

Corey Hirsch
Goalies
Petri Ylönen
Referee:
(United States) Rob Hearn
Linesmen:
(Finland) Jouni Lojander
(Italy) Helmuth Mair

Hlushko (Parks) − 02:26	1–0
Hlushko (Parks) − 35.13	2–0
Warriner (Norris) − 39:43	3–0
	3–1	42:29 − Laporte

10 min
Penalties
10 min
35
Shots
10

17 February 1994; 15:00	Slovakia	10–4 (6–2, 3–1, 1–1)	Italy	Håkons Hall, Lillehammer; Attendance: 5,123

Jaromír Dragan
Goalies
Mike Rosati
David Delfino
Referee:
(Norway) Tor Hansen
Linesmen:
(Germany) Wilhelm Schimm
(Finland) Jouni Lojander

Kontšek (PP) − 01:27	1–0
Kontšek (Haščák) − 09:02	2–0
Šatan (Švehla, Petrovický) (PP) − 10:15	3–0
Šťastný − 10:57	4–0
Šatan (Jánoš, Petrovický) − 12:14	5–0
Pálffy − 13:17	6–0
	6–1	17:32 − Topatigh (Zarrillo, Camazzola)
	6–2	18:23 − Pavlu (Ramoser, Sacratini)
Pálffy (SH) − 30:54	7–2
	7–3	32:38 − Camazzola (SH)
Daňo (Šťastný, Pálffy) (PP) − 33:41	8–3
Šťastný (Daňo, Pálffy) − 37:35	9–3
Šatan (Jánoš, Petrovický) − 49:34	10–3
	10–4	51:12 − Mansi

18 min
Penalties
18 min
40
Shots
18

17 February 1994; 17:30	France	1–7 (0–3, 1–2, 0–2)	Sweden	Gjøvik Olympic Cavern Hall, Gjøvik; Attendance: 5,150

Michel Vallière
Goalies
Tommy Salo
Referee:
(Russia) Valery Bokarev
Linesmen:
(Canada) Lonnie Cameron
(Canada) Pierre Tremblay

	0–1	00:35 − Hansson
	0–2	08:23 − Loob (Stillman)
	0–3	16.36 − Forsberg (Hansson)
	0–4	20:35 − Hansson
	0–5	30:47 − Örnskog (PP)
LeMarque (PP) − 31:57	1–5
	1–6	47:33 − Johansson (Eriksson) (PP)
	1–7	51:42 − Stillman (Bergqvist, Forsberg)

16 min
Penalties
20 min
10
Shots
47

17 February 1994; 20:00	Canada	3–3 (1–0, 1–2, 1–1)	United States	Håkons Hall, Lillehammer; Attendance: 9,245

Corey Hirsch
Goalies
Garth Snow
Referee:
(Sweden) Börje Johansson
Linesmen:
(Sweden) Stephan Eriksson
(Sweden) Johan Norrman

Norris (Savage, Warriner) − 04:46	1–0
	1–1	21:06 − Rolston (Sacco, Roberts)
	1–2	29:43 − Rolston (Beaufait, Roberts) (PP2)
Nedvěd (PS) − 32.09	2–2
Norris − 41:16	3–2
	3–3	59:32 − Marchant (Roberts) (PP)

14 min
Penalties

32
Shots
29

19 February 1994; 15:00	Canada	1–3 (1–1, 0–1, 0–1)	Slovakia	Håkons Hall, Lillehammer; Attendance: 9,245

Corey Hirsch
Goalies
Eduard Hartmann
Referee:
(Finland) Mika Lepaus
Linesmen:
(United States) Jay Borman
(Russia) Sergey Feofanov

Kariya − 01:06	1–0
	1–1	17:13 − Daňo (Pálffy)
	1–2	23:27 − Švehla (Jánoš) (PP)
	1–3	59:49 − Daňo (Šťastný, Bača) (SH, ENG)

12 min
Penalties
14 min
25
Shots
27

19 February 1994; 17:30	Italy	7–3 (2–1, 3–2, 2–0)	France	Gjøvik Olympic Cavern Hall, Gjøvik; Attendance: 5,050

David Delfino
Goalies
Petri Ylönen
Referee:
(Austria) Karl Korentschnig
Linesmen:
(Germany) Wilhelm Schimm
(Finland) Jouni Lojander

Figliuzzi (Mansi) (PP) − 12:16	1–0
	1–1	13:58 − Laporte (PP)
DeGaetano − 15:31	2–1
Figliuzzi − 24:53	3–1
Brugnoli (Ramoser) − 25:36	4–1
	4–2	32:22 − Ville (PP)
	4–3	34:35 − Maia (Laporte)
Topatigh (Orlando, Zarrillo) − 37:50	5–3
Mansi (PP) − 44:26	6–3
Zarrillo (Orlando) (ENG) − 58:27	7–3

18 min
Penalties
16 min
21
Shots
35

19 February 1994; 20:00	United States	4–6 (1–2, 0–2, 3–2)	Sweden	Håkons Hall, Lillehammer; Attendance: 9,245

Mike Dunham
Goalies
Tommy Salo
Referee:
(Czech Republic) Petr Bolina
Linesmen:
(Canada) Lonnie Cameron
(Canada) Pierre Tremblay

	0–1	10:38 − Juhlin (Näslund)
Lilley (Lazaro) − 10:38	1–1
	1–2	16:05 − Juhlin (Svensson, Berglund)
	1–3	32:51 − Juhlin (Näslund, Rohlin) (PP)
	1–4	35:21 − Hansson
Ferraro (Johnson, Crowley) − 43:25	2–4
Rolston (Drury, Ciavaglia) − 45:29	3–4
	3–5	49:25 − Johansson (Juhlin) (PP)
Rolston (Roberts, Sacco) (PP) − 50:51	4–5
	4–6	59:01 − Loob

16 min
Penalties
10 min
25
Shots
37

21 February 1994; 15:00	Sweden	2–3 (1–1, 1–2, 0–0)	Canada	Håkons Hall, Lillehammer; Attendance: 9,245

Tommy Salo
Goalies
Corey Hirsch
Referee:
(Germany) Peter Slapke
Linesmen:
(Finland) Jouni Lojander
(Russia) Sergey Feofanov

	0–1	02:39 − Kontos (Johnson)
Hansson (PP) − 08:57	1–1
	1–2	21:26 − Hlushko
Loob (Näslund) − 25:19	2–2
	2–3	30:56 − Nedvěd (Joseph)

16 min
Penalties
22 min
36
Shots
30

21 February 1994; 17:30	Slovakia	6–2 (4–1, 2–0, 0–1)	France	Gjøvik Olympic Cavern Hall, Gjøvik; Attendance: 4,698

Miroslav Michalek
Goalies
Michel Vallière
Referee:
(United States) Rob Hearn
Linesmen:
(United States) Jay Borman
(Italy) Helmuth Mair

Šatan (Petrovický) (SH) − 05:25	1–0
Petrovický (Švehla, Jánoš) − 08:40	2–0
Šatan − 15:33	3–0
	3–1	17:29 − Pousse (Girard, Guennelon)
Šatan (Petrovický, Smerčiak) (PP) − 18:09	4–1
Bača (Šťastný, Pálffy) (SH) − 34:34	5–1
Pucher (Šťastný, Pálffy) − 39:52	6–1
	6–2	46:46 − Barin

8 min
Penalties
10 min
29
Shots
25

21 February 1994; 20:00	United States	7–1 (5–1, 1–0, 1–0)	Italy	Håkons Hall, Lillehammer; Attendance: 9,243

Garth Snow
Goalies
David Delfino
Bruno Campese
Referee:
(Canada) Kevin Muench
Linesmen:
(Norway) Erik Larssen
(Norway) John Svarstad

Ciavaglia (Martin) − 01:50	1–0
Ferraro (Martin) − 03:59	2–0
Sacco (Ciavaglia) (PP) − 08:58	3–0
Roberts (Lilley) − 13:03	4–0
Ferraro (Johnson, Marchant) − 14:31	5–0
	5–1	16:30 − Iovio (Figliuzzi)
Rolston (Drury, Richter) − 36:47	6–1
Rolston (Ciavaglia) − 59:29	7–1

8 min
Penalties
16 min
47
Shots
16

== Consolation round ==
9–12th place semifinals
22 February
Austria	4
France (GWS)	5
22 February
Italy	6
Norway	3

Ninth place game
24 February
France	2
Italy	3
Eleventh place game
24 February
Norway	3
Austria	1

=== 9–12th place semifinals ===
22 February; 16:30	Austria	4–5 GWS (2–2, 0–1, 2–1) (OT: 0–0) (SO: 0–1)	France	Håkons Hall, Lillehammer; Attendance: 9,136

Brian Stankiewicz
Goalies
Petri Ylönen
Referee:
(Italy) Ruggero Savaris
Linesmen:
(Norway) John Svarstad
(Norway) Erik Larssen

Dallman (Doyle) (PP) – 01:43	1–0
	1–1	15:01 – Maïa
	1–2	15:26 – Poudrier (Perez)
Dallman (G. Pusnik) – 19:00	2–2
	2–3	24:56 – Briand
Kerth (Burton) – 49:36	3–3
	3–4	51:23 – Pajonkowski (Pousse)
Nasheim (Strong) – 53:49	4–4

Dallman
Strong (miss)
Nasheim (miss)
Shootout
Pajonkowski
Poudrier
Pousse
Laporte
4 min
Penalties
10 min
37
Shots
33

22 February; 21:00	Italy	6–3 (3–2, 1–1, 2–0)	Norway	Håkons Hall, Lillehammer; Attendance: 9,228

Bruno Campese
Goalies
Jim Marthinsen
Referee:
(Austria) Karl Korentschnig
Linesmen:
(Finland) Jouni Lojander
(Slovakia) Miloš Benek

Orlando – 00:18	1–0
	1–1	07:22 – Salsten (Dahlstrøm)
Camazzola (Orlando) – 08:06	2–1
Ramoser – 11:56	3–1
	3–2	16:38 – Hoff (Fagerli)
	3–3	21:36 – Jakobsen (Barlie)
Zarrillo (Circelli) – 37:50	4–3
Topatigh (Orlando) – 53:41	5–3
Orlando (Topatigh) – 56:36	6–3

4 min
Penalties
4 min
18
Shots
24

=== Eleventh place game ===
24 February; 16:00	Norway	3–1 (1–0, 1–0, 1–1)	Austria	Håkons Hall, Lillehammer; Attendance: 9,245

Jim Marthinsen
Goalies
Brian Stankiewicz
Referee:
(Czech Republic) Petr Bolina
Linesmen:
(France) Lionel Ollier
(Italy) Helmuth Mair

Knutsen (PP) – 05:40	1–0
Johansen – 39:22	2–0
	2–1	53:06 – A. Pusnik (G. Puschnik)
Dahlstrøm (Knutsen) (PP, ENG) – 59:53	3–1

16 min
Penalties
22 min
26
Shots
19

=== Ninth place game ===
24 February; 15:00	France	2–3 (1–1, 1–0, 0–2)	Italy	Gjøvik, Fjellhallen; Attendance: 3,770

Petri Ylönen
Goalies
Bruno Campese
Referee:
(Germany) Peter Slapke
Linesmen:
(Norway) Erik Larssen
(Norway) John Svarstad

	0–1	11:06 – Pavlu (Figliuzzi, Camazzola)
Saunier (Pajonkowski, Briand) – 00:33	1–1
Arcangeloni (Ville) (PP) – 38:25	2–1
	2–2	54:34 – Figliuzzi (PP)
	2–3	55:10 – Zarrillo (Orlando)

10 min
Penalties
8 min
30
Shots
31

== Playoff round ==
=== Bracket ===
Quarterfinals
23 February
Finland	6
United States	1
23 February
Canada (OT)	3
Czech Republic	2
23 February
Slovakia	2
Russia (OT)	3
23 February
Germany	0
Sweden	3

Semifinals
25 February
Finland	3
Canada	5
25 February
Russia	3
Sweden	4

Gold medal game
27 February
Canada	2
Sweden (GWS)	3
Bronze medal game
26 February
Russia	0
Finland	4

5–8th place semifinals
24 February
Czech Republic	5
United States	3
24 February
Germany	5
Slovakia (OT)	6

Fifth place game
26 February
Czech Republic	7
Slovakia	1
Seventh place game
26 February
Germany	4
United States	3

=== Quarterfinals ===
23 February; 15:00	Canada	3–2 OT (0–1, 1–0, 1–1) (OT 1–0)	Czech Republic	Gjøvik, Fjellhallen; Attendance: 4,180

Corey Hirsch
Goalies
Petr Bříza
Referee:
(Finland) Mika Lepaus
Linesmen:
(Sweden) Stephan Eriksson
(Sweden) Johan Norrman

	0–1	19:34 – Janecký (SH)
Savage – 26:40	1–1
	1–2	35:42 – Kučera (Janecký)
Savage (Norris) – 54:35	2–2
Kariya (PP) – 65:54	3–2

10 min
Penalties
8 min
24
Shots
37

23 February; 16:30	Finland	6–1 (2–0, 2–1, 2–0)	United States	Lillehammer, Håkons Hall; Attendance: 9,046

Jarmo Myllys
Goalies
Garth Snow
Referee:
(Canada) Kevin Muench
Linesmen:
(Germany) Wilhelm Schimm
(Czech Republic) Václav Český

Koivu (PP) – 12:51	1–0
Nieminen (Keskinen) (SH) – 16:08	2–0
	2–1	20:54 – Sacco (Lazaro) (SH)
Nieminen – 24:05	3–1
Virta (Kiprusoff, Keskinen) (PP) – 26:21	4–1
Kiprusoff (Koivu) (PP) – 46:59	5–1
Ojanen (Jutila, Kiprusoff) (PP) – 55:11	6–1

18 min
Penalties
22 min
36
Shots
28

23 February; 19:30	Germany	0–3 (0–0, 0–1, 0–2)	Sweden	Gjøvik, Fjellhallen; Attendance: 5,175

Helmut de Raaf
Goalies
Tommy Salo
Referee:
(Russia) Valery Bokarev
Linesmen:
(United States) Jay Borman
(Russia) Sergey Feofanov

0–1	Stillman (Bergqvist) – 34:14
0–2	Örnskog (Näslund) – 47:42
0–3	Svensson (Jonsson, Loob) (PP) – 49:10

28 min
Penalties
16 min
18
Shots
26

23 February; 21:00	Slovakia	2–3 OT (2–1, 0–1, 0–0) (OT: 0–1)	Russia	Lillehammer, Håkons Hall; Attendance: 9,095

Eduard Hartmann
Goalies
Andrei Zuev
Referee:
(United States) Rob Hearn
Linesmen:
(Canada) Lonnie Cameron
(United States) Pierre Tremblay

Šťastný (Daňo, Marcinko) – 10:42	1–0
	1–1	15:27 – Torgayev (Yevtyukhin) (SH)
Šatan (Petrovický) – 19:41	2–1
	2–2	39:25 – Nikolishin (PP2)
	2–3	68:39 – Vinogradov (Nikolishin)

16 min
Penalties
18 min
25
Shots
26

=== 5–8th place semifinals ===
24 February; 19:30	Czech Republic	5–3 (3–2, 1–0, 1–1)	United States	Gjøvik, Fjellhallen; Attendance: 5,078

Petr Bříza
Goalies
Mike Dunham
Referee:
(Norway) Tor Hansen
Linesmen:
(Russia) Sergey Feofanov
(Germany) Wilhelm Schimm

	0–1	02:50 – Ferraro (Sacco, Johnson)
	0–2	04:08 – Lazaro (Beaufait)
Kučera (Doležal) – 14:37	1–2
Geffert (Žemlička, Hrbek) – 16:14	2–2
Hrbek (Geffert, Žemlička) (PP) – 18:43	3–2
Doležal (Vopat, Janecký) – 35:25	4–2
Geffert (Žemlička, Hrbek) – 44:42	5–2
	5–3	59:32 – Beaufait

16 min
Penalties
20 min
35
Shots
28

24 February; 21:00	Germany	5–6 OT (3–0, 0–3, 2–2) (OT: 0–1)	Slovakia	Håkons Hall, Lillehammer; Attendance: 8,925

Josef Heiß
Goalies
Jaromír Dragan
Eduard Hartmann
Referee:
(Sweden) Börje Johansson
Linesmen:
(United States) Jay Borman
(Czech Republic) Václav Český

Truntschka (SH) – 10:51	1–0
Rumrich (Handrick, Serikow) – 18:28	2–0
Hilger (Ustorf) – 19:32	3–0
	3–1	25:46 – Pálffy (SH)
	3–2	33:33 – Kolník (Haščák, Švehla) (PP)
	3–3	37:13 – Kolník
	3–4	45:21 – Kontšek
Doucet (Franz) – 45:29	4–4
	4–5	51:09 – Kolník (Haščák, Švehla) (PP)
Handrick – 51:45	5–5
	5–6	61:38 – Haščák

12 min
Penalties
12 min
23
Shots
25

=== Semifinals ===
25 February; 19:30	Finland	3–5 (0–0, 2–2, 1–3)	Canada	Gjøvik, Fjellhallen; Attendance: 5,237

Jukka Tammi
Goalies
Corey Hirsch
Referee:
(United States) Rob Hearn
Linesmen:
(Sweden) Stephan Eriksson
(Sweden) Johan Norrman

Koivu (Peltonen) (PP) – 22:08	1–0
Keskinen (Virta) – 23:48	2–0
	2–1	35:59 – Hlushko (Joseph)
	2–2	39:24 – Nedvěd (PP)
	2–3	44:27 – Werenka (Johnson, Kariya)
	2–4	47:30 – Roy (Werenka, Mayer) (PP)
	2–5	54:19 – Parks
Lehtinen (Nieminen, Keskinen) – 59:25	3–5

12 min
Penalties
8 min
33
Shots
33

25 February; 21:00	Russia	3–4 (1–2, 0–1, 2–1)	Sweden	Håkons Hall, Lillehammer; Attendance: 9,245

Andrei Zuev
Goalies
Tommy Salo
Referee:
(Finland) Mika Lepaus
Linesmen:
(Finland) Lonnie Cameron
(Canada) Pierre Tremblay

	0–1	03:13 – Svensson (Bergqvist, Forsberg)
	0–2	06:54 – Juhlin (Forsberg, Hansson)
Tarasenko (PP) – 18:36	1–2
	1–3	24:43 – Bergqvist (Forsberg, Loob) (PP)
	1–4	45:11 – Juhlin (Näslund)
Berezin (Sorokin) – 58:49	2–4
Gusmanov (Kudashov) – 58:59	3–4

6 min
Penalties
12 min
21
Shots
18

=== Seventh place game ===
26 February; 16:30	Germany	4–3 (1–1, 1–1, 2–1)	United States	Håkons Hall, Lillehammer; Attendance: 9,045

Josef Heiß
Goalies
Garth Snow
Referee:
(Canada) Kevin Muench
Linesmen:
(Russia) Sergey Feofanov
(Canada) Lonnie Cameron

Stefan (Brandl, Meyer) (PP) – 11:03	1–0
	1–1	17:44 – Sacco (Richter)
	1–2	26:27 – Drury (Roberts, Sacco) (PP)
Mayr (Handrick) – 29:34	2–2
Hilger (Ustorf, Mayr) – 49:57	3–2
Hegen – 52:20	4–2
	4–3	52:35 – Ferraro (Richter)

2 min
Penalties
10 min
26
Shots
29

=== Fifth place game ===
26 February; 19:30	Czech Republic	7–1 (4–1, 1–0, 2–0)	Slovakia	Gjøvik, Fjellhallen; Attendance: 4,465

Roman Turek
Goalies
Eduard Hartmann
Miroslav Michalek
Referee:
(Germany) Peter Slapke
Linesmen:
(Finland) Jouni Lojander
(Sweden) Johan Norrman

	0–1	02:21 – Šatan (Haščák)
Janecký (Kučera, Kadlec) – 09:33	1–1
Sršeň (Horák, Kašťák) – 11:11	2–1
Žemlička (Geffert, Vykoukal) – 18:43	3–1
Horák (Sršeň) – 19:14	4–1
Kučera (Janecký) (PP) – 37:28	5–1
Geffert (Žemlička) – 43:30	6–1
Žemlička (Vykoukal) – 57:56	7–1

12 min
Penalties
24 min
21
Shots
33

=== Bronze medal game ===
26 February; 21:00	Russia	0–4 (0–2, 0–2, 0–0)	Finland	Håkons Hall, Lillehammer; Attendance: 9,215

Valery Ivannikov
Goalies
Jarmo Myllys
Referee:
(Sweden) Børje Johansson
Linesmen:
(Germany) Wilhelm Schimm
(Sweden) Stephan Eriksson

0–1	17:32 – Palo (Nieminen)
0–2	19:16 – Alatalo (Strömberg)
0–3	30:30 – Peltonen (Koivu) (PP)
0–4	39:34 – Strömberg (Nieminen)

8 min
Penalties
8 min
21
Shots
31

=== Gold medal game ===
27 February; 15:15	Canada	2–3 GWS (0–1, 0–0, 2–1) (OT: 0–0) (SO: 0–1)	Sweden	Håkons Hall, Lillehammer; Attendance: 9,245

Corey Hirsch
Goalies
Tommy Salo
Referee:
(United States) Rob Hearn
Linesmen:
(United States) Jay Borman
(Czech Republic) Václav Český

	0–1	06:10 – Jonsson (Loob, Forsberg) (PP)
Kariya (Kontos, Johnson) – 49:08	1–1
Mayer – 51:43	2–1
	2–2	58:11 – Svensson (Forsberg, Jonsson) (PP)

Nedvěd
Kariya
Norris (miss)
Parks (miss)
Johnson (miss)
Nedvěd (miss)
Kariya (miss)
Shootout
(miss) Loob
Svensson
(miss) Näslund
Forsberg
(miss) Hansson
(miss) Svensson
Forsberg
10 min
Penalties
10 min
21
Shots
42

== Gold medal game ==
An exciting gold medal game saw Sweden force overtime by tying the score with less than two minutes to go. After a scoreless overtime, the winner was determined by a shootout. The first five rounds saw two players for each side make their penalty shots (Nedved and Kariya for Canada and Forsberg and Svensson for Sweden). In the sixth round, both Nedved and Svensson missed their shots. Forsberg then scored on Canadian goaltender Hirsch to start the seventh round. Kariya took Canada's seventh round shot and was stopped by Swedish goaltender Salo—giving the Swedes the gold medal.

=== Commemorative Swedish stamp ===
In 1995, the Swedish postal service memorialized Forsberg's game winning shootout goal by issuing a commemorative stamp. Because goaltender Corey Hirsch would not grant permission for his likeness to be used on the stamp, he was 'disguised' by means of changing the color of his sweater and his player number.

== Final ranking ==
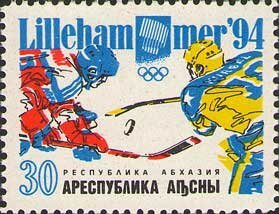
Stamp of the 1994 Winter Olympics

Rank	Team
1st place, gold medalist(s)	Sweden
2nd place, silver medalist(s)	Canada
3rd place, bronze medalist(s)	Finland
4	Russia
5	Czech Republic
6	Slovakia
7	Germany
8	United States
9	Italy
10	France
11	Norway
12	Austria

== Statistics and awards ==
=== Average age ===
Team France was the oldest team in the tournament, averaging 28 years. Team USA was the youngest team in the tournament, averaging 22 years and 11 months. Gold medalists Team Sweden averaged 26 years and 6 months. Tournament average was 26 years and 3 months.

=== Leading scorers ===
#	Player	GP	G	A	Pts	PIM	POS
1	(Slovakia) Žigmund Pálffy	8	3	7	10	8	F
2	(Slovakia) Miroslav Šatan	8	9	0	9	0	F
3	(Slovakia) Peter Šťastný	8	5	4	9	9	F
4	(Sweden) Håkan Loob	8	4	5	9	2	F
5	(Italy) Gaetano Orlando	7	3	6	9	4	F
6	(Sweden) Patrik Juhlin	8	7	1	8	16	F
7	(Czech Republic) Jiří Kučera	8	6	2	8	4	F
8	(Austria) Marty Dallman	7	4	4	8	8	F
9	(Finland) Mika Nieminen	8	3	5	8	0	F
9	(United States) David Sacco	8	3	5	8	12	F

GP = Games played; G = Goals; A = Assists; Pts = Points; PIM = Penalties in minutes; POS = Position
Source: eliteprospects.com

=== Media All-Stars ===
- Goaltender: (Sweden) Tommy Salo
- Defencemen: (Canada) Brad Werenka, (Finland) Timo Jutila
- Forwards: (Sweden) Mats Näslund, (Slovakia) Peter Šťastný, (Sweden) Patrik Juhlin
