= Pavel Geffert =

Czech ice hockey player

Personal information
- Nationality: Czech
- Born: 7 May 1968 (age 56); Prague, Czechoslovakia

Sport
- Sport: Ice hockey

Pavel Geffert (born 7 May 1968) is a Czech ice hockey player. He competed in the men's tournament at the 1994 Winter Olympics.

== Career statistics ==
=== Regular season and playoffs ===
			Regular season					Playoffs
Season	Team	League	GP	G	A	Pts	PIM	GP	G	A	Pts	PIM
1983–84	TJ Slavia IPS Praha	TCH U18	36	45	22	67		—	—	—	—	—
1985–86	TJ Slavia IPS Praha	TCH U20	32	21	15	36		—	—	—	—	—
1986–87	TJ Slavia IPS Praha	CZE.2		8				—	—	—	—	—
1987–88	TJ Sparta ČKD Praha	TCH	7	2	1	3	2	—	—	—	—	—
1987–88	TJ Slavia IPS Praha	CZE.2	41	21	13	34		—	—	—	—	—
1988–89	TJ Sparta ČKD Praha	TCH	16	2	2	4	8	—	—	—	—	—
1989–90	TJ Sparta ČKD Praha	TCH	51	10	10	20	16	—	—	—	—	—
1990–91	HC Sparta Praha	TCH	47	9	9	18	0	—	—	—	—	—
1991–92	HC Sparta Praha	TCH	38	13	8	21		9	3	3	6
1992–93	HC Sparta Praha	TCH	52	25	27	52		—	—	—	—	—
1993–94	HC Sparta Praha	ELH	38	23	31	54	16	8	4	3	7	2
1994–95	HC Sparta Praha	ELH	43	18	13	31	4	—	—	—	—	—
1996–97	HC Sparta Praha	ELH	24	1	6	7	24	—	—	—	—	—
1996–97	HC ZKZ Plzeň	ELH	24	14	15	29	31	—	—	—	—	—
1997–98	HC Keramika Plzeň	ELH	49	13	24	37	28	5	1	1	2	2
1998–99	HC Keramika Plzeň	ELH	47	12	17	29	24	5	1	0	1	0
1999–2000	HC Keramika Plzeň	ELH	11	4	11	15	10	—	—	—	—	—
1999–2000	HC Slavia Praha	ELH	40	6	12	18	34	—	—	—	—	—
2000–01	HC Vagnerplast Kladno	ELH	42	8	11	19	12	—	—	—	—	—
2000–01	HC Femax Havířov	ELH	5	0	0	0	6	—	—	—	—	—
2001–02	HC Vagnerplast Kladno	ELH	47	7	12	19	26	—	—	—	—	—
2002–03	HC Mladá Boleslav	CZE.2	12	2	1	3	4	—	—	—	—	—
TCH totals			211	61	57	118	—	9	3	3	6	—
ELH totals			370	106	152	258	225	18	6	4	10	4

=== International ===
Year	Team	Event	GP	G	A	Pts	PIM
1985	Czechoslovakia	EJC
1986	Czechoslovakia	EJC
1994	Czech Republic	OG	5	3	2	5	2
1995	Czech Republic	WC	8	1	1	2	2
Senior totals			13	4	3	7	4

"Pavel Geffert". Elite Prospects.
