= Miroslav Marcinko =

Slovak ice hockey player

Personal information
- Nationality: Slovak
- Born: 16 January 1964 (age 61); Poprad, Czechoslovakia

Sport
- Sport: Ice hockey

Miroslav Marcinko (born 16 January 1964) is a Slovak ice hockey player. He competed in the men's tournament at the 1994 Winter Olympics.

== Career statistics ==
=== Regular season and playoffs ===
			Regular season					Playoffs
Season	Team	League	GP	G	A	Pts	PIM	GP	G	A	Pts	PIM
1982–83	TJ PS Poprad	SVK.2
1983–84	TJ VSŽ Košice	TCH	37	3	9	12	18	—	—	—	—	—
1984–85	ASVŠ Dukla Trenčín	TCH	36	2	0	2	26	—	—	—	—	—
1986–87	TJ VSŽ Košice	TCH	29	1	5	6	18	2	0	0	0
1987–88	TJ VSŽ Košice	TCH	33	2	2	4		—	—	—	—	—
1988–89	TJ VSŽ Košice	TCH	23	1	0	1	12	7	1	0	1
1989–90	TJ VSŽ Košice	TCH	50	7	7	14		—	—	—	—	—
1990–91	HC VSŽ Košice	TCH	52	9	18	27	20	5	1	0	1	0
1991–92	HC VSŽ Košice	TCH	38	6	4	10		8	1	1	2
1992–93	HC Košice	TCH	41	4	13	17		—	—	—	—	—
1993–94	Ilves	SM-l	2	0	1	1	0	—	—	—	—	—
1993–94	HC Košice	SVK	39	2	5	7		—	—	—	—	—
1994–95	Hockey Club de Reims	FRA	28	3	9	12	22	8	1	1	2	4
1995–96	Hockey Club de Reims	FRA	27	1	9	10	16	9	0	1	1	2
1996–97	HK VTJ Spišská Nová Ves	SVK	47	5	12	17	46	—	—	—	—	—
1997–98	HK VTJ Spišská Nová Ves	SVK	37	3	14	17	24	—	—	—	—	—
1998–99	HK VTJ Spišská Nová Ves	SVK	47	8	12	20	12	3	0	0	0	0
1999–2000	EV Zeltweg	AUT.2	26	6	10	16	10	—	—	—	—	—
2000–01	TEV Miesbach	GER.4	14	0	5	5	6	—	—	—	—	—
TCH totals			339	35	58	93	—	22	2	2	4	—
SVK totals			170	18	43	61	82	3	0	0	0	0

=== International ===
Year	Team	Event	GP	G	A	Pts	PIM
1982	Czechoslovakia	EJC
1993	Slovakia	OGQ	4	1	0	1	2
1994	Slovakia	OG	8	0	1	1	6
1994	Slovakia	WC C	6	1	1	2	2
1995	Slovakia	WC B	7	1	3	4	6
Senior totals			25	3	5	8	16

"Miroslav Marcinko". Elite Prospects.
