= Roman Kontšek =

Slovak ice hockey player

Personal information
- Nationality: Slovak
- Born: 11 June 1970 (age 54); Žilina, Czechoslovakia

Sport
- Sport: Ice hockey

Roman Kontšek (born 11 June 1970) is a Slovak ice hockey player. He competed in the men's tournaments at the 1994 Winter Olympics and the 1998 Winter Olympics.

== Career statistics ==
=== Regular season and playoffs ===
			Regular season					Playoffs
Season	Team	League	GP	G	A	Pts	PIM	GP	G	A	Pts	PIM
1986–87	TJ Hutník ZŤS Martin	SVK.2
1988–89	ASVŠ Dukla Trenčín	TCH	21	4	8	12	12	—	—	—	—	—
1989–90	ASVŠ Dukla Trenčín	TCH	21	8	7	15		—	—	—	—	—
1990–91	ASVŠ Dukla Trenčín	TCH	48	13	18	31	24	6	2	5	7	0
1991–92	ASVŠ Dukla Trenčín	TCH	26	5	6	11		9	0	0	0
1992–93	ASVŠ Dukla Trenčín	TCH	49	12	23	35		—	—	—	—	—
1993–94	Dukla Trenčín	SVK	38	28	31	59		—	—	—	—	—
1994–95	Dukla Trenčín	SVK	31	7	24	31	24	6	1	1	2	8
1995–96	HC Železárny Třinec	ELH	12	4	1	5	4	2	1	1	2	0
1996–97	Dukla Trenčín	SVK	24	12	12	24	18	—	—	—	—	—
1996–97	HC Železárny Třinec	ELH	49	17	21	38	18	4	0	0	0	2
1997–98	HC Železárny Třinec	ELH	26	3	4	7	8	—	—	—	—	—
1997–98	Dukla Trenčín	SVK	24	6	23	29	24	—	—	—	—	—
1998–99	Dukla Trenčín	SVK	44	14	24	38	18	—	—	—	—	—
1999–2000	HC Femax Havířov	ELH	34	9	8	17	49	—	—	—	—	—
2000–01	HC Femax Havířov	ELH	43	7	13	20	24	—	—	—	—	—
2001–02	Dukla Trenčín	SVK	16	1	6	7	33	—	—	—	—	—
2002–03	SV Ritten	ITA.2	37	30	49	79	32	4	3	2	5	2
2003–04	MsHK KP Žilina	SVK	37	11	18	29	53	4	2	1	3	6
2004–05	MsHK KP Žilina	SVK	49	9	28	37	36	5	0	2	2	4
2005–06	MsHK KP Žilina	SVK	51	14	22	36	74	17	2	4	6	12
2006–07	MsHK Žilina a.s	SVK	13	2	3	5	10	—	—	—	—	—
2006–07	HC Košice	SVK	36	7	21	28	34	11	2	4	6	8
2007–08	MsHK Žilina a.s	SVK	37	8	21	29	58	4	0	2	2	4
2008–09	MsHK Garmin Žilina	SVK	32	6	15	21	24	—	—	—	—	—
TCH totals			165	42	62	104	—	15	2	5	7	—
SVK totals			432	125	248	373	406	47	7	14	21	42
ELH totals			164	40	47	87	103	6	1	1	2	8

=== International ===
Year	Team	Event	GP	G	A	Pts	PIM
1987	Czechoslovakia	EJC	7	6	6	12	4
1988	Czechoslovakia	EJC	5	4	7	11
1989	Czechoslovakia	WJC	6	5	3	8	4
1994	Slovakia	OG	8	4	0	4	10
1994	Slovakia	WC C	6	2	3	5	6
1997	Slovakia	WC	8	4	2	6	4
1998	Slovakia	OG	4	0	1	1	0
Junior totals			18	15	16	31	8
Senior totals			26	10	6	16	20

"Roman Kontsek". Elite Prospects.
