= Jozef Daňo =

Slovak ice hockey player

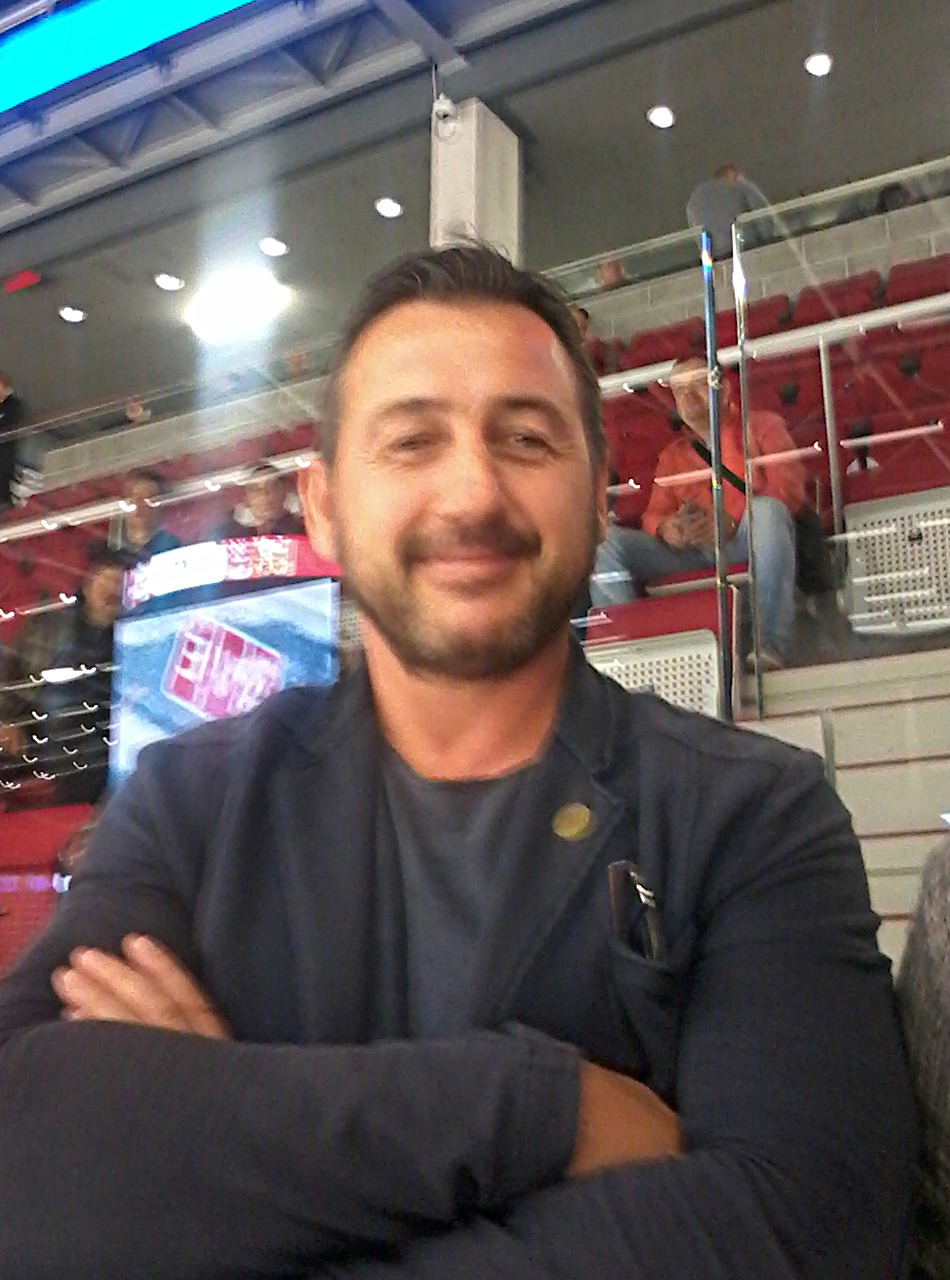
- Daňo in 2017
- Born: 28 December 1968 (age 57) Nitra, Czechoslovakia
- Height: 6 ft 0 in (183 cm)
- Weight: 192 lb (87 kg; 13 st 10 lb)
- Position: Left wing
- Shot: Left
- Played for: HC Nitra; HK Dukla Trencin; HC Ocelari Trinec; Ak Bars Kazan; HKM Zvolen; EK Zell am See; EV Zeltweg; HK Spisska Nova Ves
- National team: Slovakia
- NHL draft: Undrafted
- Playing career: 1990–2009

Jozef Daňo (born 28 December 1968) is a Slovak former professional ice hockey player. He competed in the men's tournaments at the 1994 Winter Olympics and the 1998 Winter Olympics. His son, Marko Daňo, also plays ice hockey.

== Career statistics ==
=== Regular season and playoffs ===
			Regular season					Playoffs
Season	Team	League	GP	G	A	Pts	PIM	GP	G	A	Pts	PIM
1990–91	AC/HC Nitra	TCH	43	13	9	22	48	—	—	—	—	—
1991–92	AC/HC Nitra	TCH
1992–93	ASVŠ Dukla Trenčín	TCH	47	18	25	43	56	—	—	—	—	—
1993–94	Dukla Trenčín	SVK	38	15	26	41		—	—	—	—	—
1994–95	Dukla Trenčín	SVK	35	16	18	34	41	9	5	3	8	8
1995–96	Dukla Trenčín	SVK	40	17	23	40	63	—	—	—	—	—
1995–96	HC Železárny Třinec	ELH	8	2	5	7	12	—	—	—	—	—
1996–97	HC Železárny Třinec	ELH	42	15	24	39	56	2	0	0	0	2
1997–98	HC Železárny Třinec	ELH	49	17	34	51	82	13	2	4	6	4
1998–99	HC Železárny Třinec	ELH	48	19	25	44	98	10	1	5	6	36
1999–2000	HC Oceláři Třinec	ELH	20	6	5	11	31	4	2	0	2	6
2000–01	HC Oceláři Třinec	ELH	41	9	12	21	67	—	—	—	—	—
2001–02	Ak Bars Kazan	RSL	10	2	2	4	2	—	—	—	—	—
2001–02	HKm Zvolen	SVK	19	4	7	11	2	—	—	—	—	—
2002–03	EK Zell am See	AUT.2	1	1	1	2	0	—	—	—	—	—
2003–04	EK Zell am See	AUT.2	29	27	25	52	80	—	—	—	—	—
2004–05	EK Zell am See	AUT.2	42	48	44	92	193	—	—	—	—	—
2005–06	EK Zell am See	AUT.2	34	23	31	54	216	—	—	—	—	—
2006–07	EV Zeltweg	AUT.2	26	18	45	63	64	12	11	18	29	20
2007–08	EV Zeltweg	AUT.2	31	18	35	53	94	5	0	2	2	6
2008–09	EV Zeltweg	AUT.2	21	11	15	26	114	—	—	—	—	—
SVK totals			132	52	74	126	106	9	5	3	8	8
ELH totals			298	99	139	238	450	29	5	9	14	48
AUT.2 totals			184	146	196	342	761	17	11	20	31	26

=== International ===
Year	Team	Event	GP	G	A	Pts	PIM
1994	Slovakia	OG	8	3	3	6	6
1994	Slovakia	WC C	6	2	4	6	8
1995	Slovakia	WC B	7	1	6	7	4
1996	Slovakia	WC	5	1	0	1	4
1997	Slovakia	WC	2	1	0	1	0
1998	Slovakia	OG	4	1	2	3	4
1998	Slovakia	WC	6	4	2	6	4
1999	Slovakia	WC	5	3	4	7	4
Senior totals			43	16	21	37	34
