= Kamil Kašťák =

Czech former ice hockey player (born 1966)

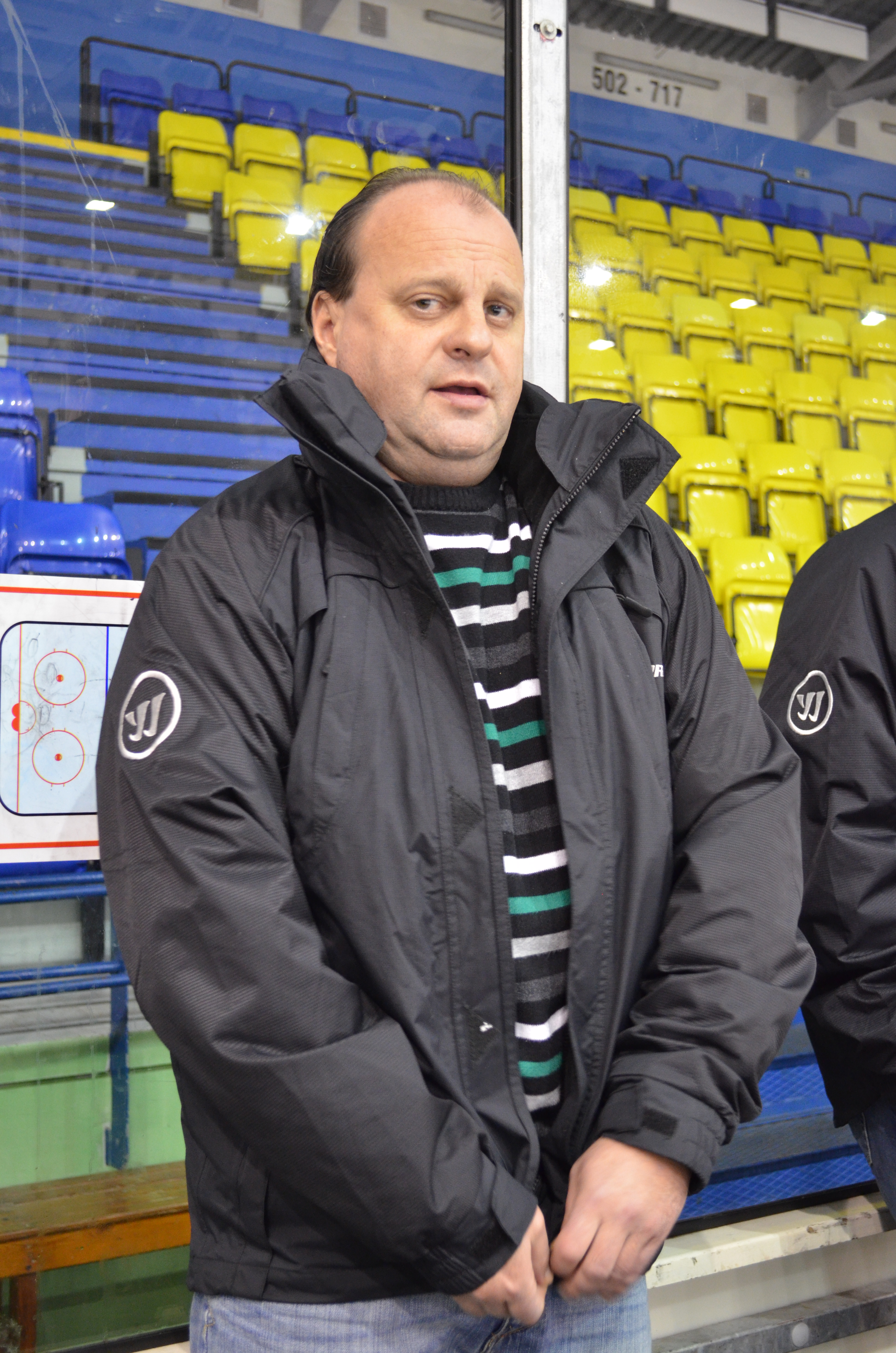
- Kamil Kašťák in 2012
- Born: 8 May 1966 (age 58); Most, Czechoslovakia
- Height: 5 ft 10 in (178 cm)
- Weight: 171 lb (78 kg; 12 st 3 lb)
- Position: Left wing
- Shot: Left
- Played for: Dukla Jihlava; HC Litvínov; HC Sparta Prague; HC Plzeň
- National team: Czechoslovakia and Czech Republic
- Playing career: 1986–1999

Olympic medal record

Men's Ice hockey
Bronze medal – third place	1992 Albertville	Ice hockey

Kamil Kašťák (born 8 May 1966) is a Czech former ice hockey player.

== Career ==
Kašťák played in the Czech Extraliga for Dukla Jihlava, HC Litvínov, HC Sparta Prague and HC Plzeň. He also played in the Swedish Elitserien for HV 71, the SM-liiga in Finland for Lukko and finished his career in Germany for the Lausitzer Füchse.

Kašťák played on the 1992 Czechoslovak Bronze Medal winning Olympic ice hockey team.

In April 2005 he became the coach of the Czech Second League team HC Most.

== Career statistics ==
=== Regular season and playoffs ===
			Regular season					Playoffs
Season	Team	League	GP	G	A	Pts	PIM	GP	G	A	Pts	PIM
1983–84	TJ CHZ Litvínov	TCH	41	10	5	15	2	—	—	—	—	—
1984–85	TJ CHZ Litvínov	TCH	37	3	3	6	5	—	—	—	—	—
1986–87	ASD Dukla Jihlava	TCH	42	4	9	13	4	—	—	—	—	—
1987–88	TJ CHZ Litvínov	TCH	42	19	18	37	—	—	—	—	—	—
1988–89	TJ CHZ Litvínov	TCH	44	20	12	32	20	—	—	—	—	—
1989–90	TJ CHZ Litvínov	TCH	52	14	14	28	—	—	—	—	—	—
1990–91	HC CHZ Litvínov	TCH	59	28	23	51	10	—	—	—	—	—
1991–92	HC Chemopetrol Litvínov	TCH	47	25	31	56	—	—	—	—	—	—
1992–93	HV71	SEL	38	18	6	24	18	—	—	—	—	—
1993–94	Lukko	Liiga	19	4	7	11	2	—	—	—	—	—
1993–94	HC Chemopetrol Litvínov	ELH	22	13	10	23	2	4	1	0	1	4
1994–95	IK Oskarshamn	SWE III	6	5	4	9	0	—	—	—	—	—
1995–96	HC Sparta Praha	ELH	27	4	10	14	8	—	—	—	—	—
1995–96	HC ZKZ Plzeň	ELH	12	1	4	5	0	3	1	0	1	0
1996–97	HC Chemopetrol, a.s.	ELH	32	4	8	12	2	—	—	—	—	—
1997–98	ES Weißwasser	DEU II	61	23	40	63	28	—	—	—	—	—
1998–99	ES Weißwasser	DEU II	47	11	23	34	6	—	—	—	—	—
1999–2000	HC Most	CZE III	20	2	10	12	6	—	—	—	—	—
TCH totals			355	117	111	228	—	—	—	—	—	—
ELH totals			93	22	32	54	12	7	2	0	2	4

=== International ===
Year	Team	Event	GP	G	A	Pts	PIM
1983	Czechoslovakia	EJC	5	1	6	7	2
1984	Czechoslovakia	WJC	5	4	3	7	2
1984	Czechoslovakia	EJC	—	—	—	—	—
1985	Czechoslovakia	WJC	4	0	2	2	2
1986	Czechoslovakia	WJC	7	4	3	7	0
1991	Czechoslovakia	CC	5	1	2	3	0
1992	Czechoslovakia	OG	8	2	5	7	0
1992	Czechoslovakia	WC	8	0	1	1	2
1993	Czech Republic	WC	8	2	6	8	4
1994	Czech Republic	OG	7	1	3	4	2
1994	Czech Republic	WC	6	1	1	2	0
Junior totals			21	8	15	23	6
Senior totals			42	7	18	25	8
