= René Pucher =

Slovak ice hockey player

- Born: 2 December 1970 (age 55) Prešov, Czechoslovakia
- Height: 5 ft 11 in (180 cm)
- Weight: 163 lb (74 kg; 11 st 9 lb)
- Position: Center
- Shot: Left
- Played for: HC Košice; ZPA Prešov; HC Thurgau; Lausanne HC; HC Havířov Panthers; MHC Martin
- National team: Slovakia
- Playing career: 1990–2010

René Pucher (born 2 December 1970) is a Slovak ice hockey player. He competed in the men's tournament at the 1994 Winter Olympics.

== Career statistics ==
=== Regular season and playoffs ===
			Regular season					Playoffs
Season	Team	League	GP	G	A	Pts	PIM	GP	G	A	Pts	PIM
1990–91	HC VSŽ Košice	TCH	34	3	2	5	16	4	0	0	0	0
1991–92	HC VSŽ Košice	TCH	4	0	1	1	0	—	—	—	—	—
1992–93	HC Košice	TCH	18	9	5	14		—	—	—	—	—
1992–93	ZPA Prešov	SVK.2	25	14	6	20		—	—	—	—	—
1993–94	HC Košice	SVK	45	20	13	33		—	—	—	—	—
1994–95	HC Košice	SVK	34	16	18	34	10	—	—	—	—	—
1995–96	HC Košice	SVK	50	25	19	44	8	—	—	—	—	—
1996–97	HC Košice	SVK	41	12	28	40	49	—	—	—	—	—
1997–98	HC Košice	SVK	47	10	24	34	32	—	—	—	—	—
1998–99	HC VSŽ Košice	SVK	47	11	17	28	46	—	—	—	—	—
1999–2000	HC VSŽ Košice	SVK	46	14	20	34	20	—	—	—	—	—
2000–01	HK VTJ Farmakol Prešov	SVK.2	38	31	39	70	40	—	—	—	—	—
2001–02	HC Thurgau	SUI.2	19	9	12	21	6	3	2	0	2	2
2001–02	Lausanne HC	NLA	9	0	2	2	4	—	—	—	—	—
2002–03	HC Havířov Panthers	ELH	7	0	0	0	4	—	—	—	—	—
2002–03	Martinskeho hokeja club	SVK	11	2	3	5	16	—	—	—	—	—
2008–09	HC 07 Prešov	SVK.2	22	4	7	11	20	7	1	1	2	18
2009–10	HC 07 Prešov	SVK.2	36	6	6	12	16	15	2	3	5	8
SVK totals			321	110	142	252	181	—	—	—	—	—

=== International ===
Year	Team	Event	GP	G	A	Pts	PIM
1994	Slovakia	OG	6	1	0	1	2
1994	Slovakia	WC C	6	3	3	6	0
1995	Slovakia	WC B	7	3	3	6	2
1996	Slovakia	WC	5	1	0	1	0
1998	Slovakia	WC	6	0	0	0	6
1999	Slovakia	WC	6	0	0	0	2
Senior totals			36	8	6	14	12

"Rene Pucher". Elite Prospects.
