= Leo Stefan =

German ice hockey player

Personal information
- Nationality: German
- Born: 22 February 1970 (age 55); Chelyabinsk, Russia

Sport
- Sport: Ice hockey

Leo Stefan (born 22 February 1970) is a German ice hockey player. He competed in the men's tournament at the 1994 Winter Olympics.

== Career statistics ==
=== Regular season and playoffs ===
			Regular season					Playoffs
Season	Team	League	GP	G	A	Pts	PIM	GP	G	A	Pts	PIM
1986–87	Metallurg Chelyabinsk	URS.2	8	0	1	1	2	—	—	—	—	—
1987–88	Metallurg Chelyabinsk	URS.2	55	8	2	10	31	—	—	—	—	—
1988–89	Metallurg Chelyabinsk	URS.2	22	3	1	4	8	—	—	—	—	—
1988–89	SKA Sverdlovsk	URS.2	21	2	3	5	10	—	—	—	—	—
1989–90	SKA Sverdlovsk	URS.2	7	1	1	2	2	—	—	—	—	—
1990–91	Kölner EC	1.GBun	41	8	18	26	20	14	0	1	1	2
1991–92	Kölner EC	1.GBun	44	7	12	19	34	4	0	1	1	0
1992–93	Kölner EC	1.GBun	44	12	19	31	22	12	4	5	9	4
1993–94	Kölner EC	1.GBun	44	18	29	47	30	10	5	5	10	6
1994–95	Kölner Haie	DEL	43	13	32	45	40	18	8	19	27	8
1995–96	Kölner Haie	DEL	35	17	24	41	20	14	7	4	11	8
1996–97	Düsseldorfer EG	DEL	47	13	17	30	22	4	3	2	5	2
1997–98	Düsseldorfer EG	DEL	36	12	9	21	4	3	1	0	1	0
1998–99	Düsseldorfer EG	GER.2	52	23	41	64	70	9	6	4	10	12
1999–2000	Düsseldorfer EG	GER.2	40	22	22	44	30	12	6	10	16	2
2000–01	Düsseldorfer EG	DEL	58	10	12	22	48	—	—	—	—	—
2001–02	DEG Metro Stars	DEL	59	17	8	25	46	—	—	—	—	—
2002–03	DEG Metro Stars	DEL	52	9	12	21	18	5	0	0	0	0
2003–04	Wölfe Freiburg	DEL	34	9	13	22	10	—	—	—	—	—
2003–04	Kölner Haie	DEL	12	2	7	9	4	6	0	2	2	2
2004–05	Füchse Duisburg	GER.2	30	10	10	20	32	5	1	1	2	2
2004–05	Kölner Haie	DEL	10	0	0	0	2	—	—	—	—	—
1.GBun totals			173	45	78	123	106	40	9	12	21	12
DEL totals			386	102	134	236	214	50	19	27	46	20

=== International ===
Year	Team	Event	GP	G	A	Pts	PIM
1994	Germany	OG	8	3	1	4	4
1994	Germany	WC	5	1	0	1	4
1995	Germany	WC	5	0	1	1	2
1996	Germany	WC	6	0	2	2	2
1996	Germany	WCH	4	0	2	2	0
1997	Germany	OGQ	3	1	0	1	0
1997	Germany	WC	8	0	1	1	12
1998	Germany	WC	6	0	1	1	6
Senior totals			45	5	8	13	30

"Leo Stefan". Elite Prospects.
