= Bruno Campese =

Canadian-born Italian ice hockey player

- Born: August 3, 1963 (age 62) Nelson, British Columbia, Canada
- Height: 5 ft 10 in (178 cm)
- Weight: 181 lb (82 kg; 12 st 13 lb)
- Position: Goaltender
- Caught: Left
- Played for: HC Milano; HC Asiago; Augsburger Panther; VEU Feldkirch; Bracknell Bees
- National team: Italy
- NHL draft: 249th overall, 1982; Boston Bruins
- Playing career: 1988–2000

Bruno Campese (born August 3, 1963) is a Canadian ice hockey goaltender. He was selected by the Boston Bruins in the 12th round (249th overall) of the 1982 NHL entry draft. Until 2015, Campese was the general manager of the Prince Albert Raiders in the Western Hockey League (WHL).

Campese, a true student-athlete, earned both a bachelors degree (1987) and a masters degree (1989) from Eastern Washington University, Cheney, Washington, USA.

== Career ==
Campese competed at the 1994 Winter Olympic Games, and also at the 1993, 1994, and 1995 IIHF World Championships, as a member of the Italy national ice hockey team.

In 2007, the Prince Albert Raiders of the Western Hockey League hired Campese as their head coach, and on January 14, 2008, he took on the added responsibility as the team's general manager. On October 28, 2011, Campese relinquished his head coaching position to his assistant Steve Young but continued as general manager for the Raiders.
