= Wolfgang Kummer (ice hockey) =

German ice hockey player

Personal information
- National team: Germany
- Born: 29 March 1970 (age 55); Rosenheim, Germany
- Height: 187 cm (6 ft 2 in)
- Weight: 90 kg (198 lb; 14 st 2 lb)

Sport
- Sport: Ice hockey
- Position: Forward
- Club: Sportbund DJK Rosenheim U16 (1984-85) Sportbund DJK Rosenheim U18 (1985-87) Sportbund DJK Rosenheim U20 (1987-89) Sportbund DJK Rosenheim (1988-92) Düsseldorfer EG (1992-96) Kaufbeurer Adler (1996-98)

Wolfgang Kummer (born 29 March 1970) is a German ice hockey player. He competed in the men's tournament at the 1994 Winter Olympics.
