= Michel Vallière =

French ice hockey player

Personal information
- Nationality: French
- Born: 20 March 1962 (age 63); Montreal, Quebec, Canada

Sport
- Sport: Ice hockey

Michel Vallière (born 20 March 1962) is a Canadian-born French former ice hockey goaltender.

== Early life ==
Vallière was born in Montreal, Quebec, Canada.

== Career ==
Vallière played in the International Hockey League for the Flint Spirits and the Salt Lake Golden Eagles and the American Hockey League for the Baltimore Skipjacks before moving to Europe. He went on to play in France for Ducs d'Angers and Brest Albatros Hockey as well in Germany for the Nürnberg Ice Tigers.

Vallière also competed in the men's tournament at the 1994 Winter Olympics.
