= Oto Haščák =

Slovak ice hockey player

- Born: 31 January 1964 (age 61); Martin, Czechoslovakia
- Height: 6 ft 1 in (185 cm)
- Weight: 198 lb (90 kg; 14 st 2 lb)
- Position: Center
- Shot: Right
- Played for: HK Dukla Trencin; Södertälje SK; Västra Frölunda HC; Kaufbeurer Adler; HC Vsetín; HC Zlín; Porin Ässät
- National team: Slovakia
- NHL draft: 143rd overall, 1989; Boston Bruins
- Playing career: 1983–2002

Oto Haščák (born 31 January 1964) is a Slovak former ice hockey player. He competed in the men's tournaments at the 1988 Winter Olympics, the 1994 Winter Olympics and the 1998 Winter Olympics.

== Career statistics ==
=== Regular season and playoffs ===
			Regular season					Playoffs
Season	Team	League	GP	G	A	Pts	PIM	GP	G	A	Pts	PIM
1983–84	ASVŠ Dukla Trenčín	TCH	35	5	8	13	26	—	—	—	—	—
1984–85	ASVŠ Dukla Trenčín	TCH	39	16	14	30	28	—	—	—	—	—
1985–86	ASVŠ Dukla Trenčín	TCH	31	12	11	23	33	—	—	—	—	—
1986–87	ASVŠ Dukla Trenčín	TCH	29	15	8	23	56	—	—	—	—	—
1987–88	ASVŠ Dukla Trenčín	TCH	23	10	8	18	28	—	—	—	—	—
1988–89	ASVŠ Dukla Trenčín	TCH	33	12	24	36	50	10	2	12	14
1989–90	ASVŠ Dukla Trenčín	TCH	48	16	40	56	62	—	—	—	—	—
1990–91	Södertälje SK	SEL	32	13	10	23	30	—	—	—	—	—
1991–92	Södertälje SK	SEL	21	8	6	14	24	—	—	—	—	—
1991–92	Södertälje SK	Allsv	16	4	16	20	14	7	1	1	2	4
1992–93	Södertälje SK	SWE.2	31	19	31	50	42	2	0	1	1	4
1993–94	Västra Frölunda HC	SEL	37	19	19	38	26	4	2	1	3	6
1994–95	Kaufbeurer Adler	DEL	43	19	29	48	30	2	0	1	1	4
1995–96	Kaufbeurer Adler	DEL	30	14	20	34	52	—	—	—	—	—
1995–96	Dukla Trenčín	SVK	6	2	5	7	12	13	6	10	16	4
1996–97	HC Petra Vsetín	ELH	39	11	22	33	16	8	0	4	4	2
1997–98	HC ZPS-Barum Zlín	ELH	10	2	8	10	6	—	—	—	—	—
1997–98	Ässät	SM-l	27	6	11	17	24	—	—	—	—	—
1998–99	Dukla Trenčín	SVK	16	8	7	15	30	2	1	1	2	2
2000–01	Dukla Trenčín	SVK	21	3	16	19	52	12	2	5	7	38
2001–02	Dukla Trenčín	SVK	17	1	9	10	12	—	—	—	—	—
TCH totals			238	86	113	199	183	10	2	12	14	—
SEL totals			90	40	35	75	80	4	2	1	3	6

=== International ===
Year	Team	Event	GP	G	A	Pts	PIM
1988	Czechoslovakia	OG	6	1	3	4	0
1989	Czechoslovakia	WC	10	2	2	4	4
1993	Slovakia	OGQ	4	1	3	4	0
1994	Slovakia	OG	7	1	6	7	4
1994	Slovakia	WC C	1	2	0	2	0
1995	Slovakia	WC B	7	1	8	9	10
1996	Slovakia	WC	5	1	1	2	0
1996	Slovakia	WCH	3	0	1	1	0
1998	Slovakia	OG	2	0	0	0	4
Senior totals			54	11	26	37	30

"Oto Hascak". Elite Prospects.
