= Pavel Torgayev =

Russian ice hockey player (born 1966)

- Born: January 25, 1966 (age 60) Gorky, Soviet Union
- Height: 6 ft 0 in (183 cm)
- Weight: 187 lb (85 kg; 13 st 5 lb)
- Position: Left wing
- Shot: Left
- Played for: Torpedo Nizhny Novgorod; TPS; Calgary Flames; HC Lugano; HC Davos; HC Fribourg-Gottéron; Tampa Bay Lightning; HC Severstal
- National team: Russia
- NHL draft: 279th overall, 1994; Calgary Flames
- Playing career: 1982–2005

Pavel Viktorovich Torgayev (Russian: Павел Викторович Торгаев; born January 25, 1966) is a Russian former professional ice hockey player. He played 55 games in the National Hockey League for the Calgary Flames and Tampa Bay Lightning from 1995 to 1999. The rest of his career, which lasted from 1982 to 2005, was mainly spent in Russia. He was selected by the Flames in the 11th round of the 1994 NHL entry draft. Internationally Torgayev played for the Soviet Union national junior team and then the Russian national team at the 1994 Winter Olympics and 1995 World Championships.

== Playing career ==
Torgaev spent 12 seasons in the Soviet League before moving to Finland for two years in 1993. After being drafted by the Flames, Torgaev came to North America, where he appeared in 41 regular season games with the Flames in 1995–96, recording six goals and ten assists in 41 games. After returning to Europe to play in Switzerland for three seasons, Torgaev once again returned to the NHL in 1999–00, Torgaev appeared in nine more games with the Flames before being claimed by Tampa Bay on waivers. After playing five more games with the Lightning, he refused an assignment to the minor leagues, and returned to Russia, where he remained until his retirement following the 2004–05 season.

Torgaev represented his nation internationally several times. He was a member of the bronze medal winning Soviet team at the 1985 World Junior Championships. Torgaev was also a member of the Russian national team at the 1994 Winter Olympics, scoring two goals as the Russians finished fourth. In 1995, he again represented Russia at the World Championships.

== Career statistics ==
=== Regular season and playoffs ===
			Regular season					Playoffs
Season	Team	League	GP	G	A	Pts	PIM	GP	G	A	Pts	PIM
1982–83	Torpedo Gorky	USSR	4	0	0	0	0	—	—	—	—	—
1983–84	Torpedo Gorky	USSR	27	2	3	5	8	—	—	—	—	—
1984–85	Torpedo Gorky	USSR	47	11	5	16	52	—	—	—	—	—
1985–86	Torpedo Gorky	USSR	38	1	4	5	18	—	—	—	—	—
1986–87	Torpedo Gorky	USSR	40	6	9	15	30	—	—	—	—	—
1987–88	Torpedo Gorky	USSR	25	7	4	11	14	—	—	—	—	—
1988–89	Torpedo Gorky	USSR	26	6	3	9	17	—	—	—	—	—
1989–90	Torpedo Gorky	USSR	48	18	5	23	64	—	—	—	—	—
1990–91	Torpedo Gorky	USSR	37	10	5	15	22	—	—	—	—	—
1991–92	Torpedo Nizhny Novgorod	CIS	36	11	2	13	42	9	2	2	4	4
1992–93	Torpedo Nizhny Novgorod	RUS	5	1	0	1	4	—	—	—	—	—
1992–93	Kiekko–67	FIN-2	30	16	20	36	48	—	—	—	—	—
1993–94	TPS	FIN	47	19	11	30	60	3	0	1	1	14
1994–95	JYP	FIN	50	13	18	31	44	4	0	1	1	25
1995–96	Calgary Flames	NHL	6	10	16	14	1	0	0	0	0
1995–96	Saint John Flames	AHL	16	11	6	17	18	—	—	—	—	—
1996–97	Saint John Flames	AHL	5	1	2	3	4	—	—	—	—	—
1996–97	HC Lugano	NDA	34	18	21	39	87	8	3	3	6	10
1997–98	HC Davos	NDA	38	20	27	47	65	17	6	9	15	14
1998–99	HC Fribourg–Gottéron	NDA	26	15	11	26	36	—	—	—	—	—
1999–00	Calgary Flames	NHL	9	0	2	2	4	—	—	—	—	—
1999–00	Tampa Bay Lightning	NHL	5	0	2	2	2	—	—	—	—	—
1999–00	Long Beach Ice Dogs	IHL	36	8	9	17	47	—	—	—	—	—
2000–01	Torpedo Nizhny Novgorod	RSL	24	6	6	12	14	—	—	—	—	—
2001–02	Severstal Cherepovets	RSL	46	11	17	28	40	4	0	2	2	0
2002–03	Severstal Cherepovets	RSL	41	2	8	10	38	12	1	2	3	8
2003–04	Torpedo Nizhny Novgorod	RSL	56	4	10	14	72	—	—	—	—	—
2004–05	Severstal Cherepovets	RSL	57	6	8	14	58	—	—	—	—	—
USSR/CIS totals			328	72	41	113	267	9	2	2	4	4
RSL totals			224	28	50	78	224	16	1	4	5	8
NHL totals			55	6	14	20	20	1	0	0	0	0

=== International ===
Medal record

Representing Soviet Union

World Junior Championships
Gold medal – first place	1986 Canada	
Bronze medal – third place	1985 Finland	

European Junior Championships
Gold medal – first place	1984 West Germany	

Year	Team	Event	GP	G	A	Pts	PIM
1984	Soviet Union	EJC	5	0	4	4	8
1985	Soviet Union	WJC	7	2	2	4	8
1986	Soviet Union	WJC	7	2	2	4	6
1994	Russia	OLY	8	2	1	3	10
1995	Russia	WC	6	0	2	2	4
Junior totals			19	4	8	12	22
Senior totals			14	2	3	5	14
