= Patrik Juhlin =

Swedish ice hockey player

- Born: April 24, 1970 (age 56) Huddinge, Sweden
- Height: 6 ft 0 in (183 cm)
- Weight: 194 lb (88 kg; 13 st 12 lb)
- Position: Left wing
- Shot: Left
- Played for: Elitserien/Allsvenskan; Västerås IK; NHL; Philadelphia Flyers; AHL; Hershey Bears; Philadelphia Phantoms; SM-liiga; Jokerit; NLA; SC Bern; HC Davos
- National team: Sweden
- NHL draft: 34th overall, 1989; Philadelphia Flyers
- Playing career: 1989–2009

Clas Patrik Juhlin (born April 24, 1970) is a Swedish former professional ice hockey forward who won Olympic gold at the 1994 Winter Olympics and was the greatest goal scorer of the winning team with 7 goals in 8 matches. He played parts of two seasons in the National Hockey League (NHL) with the Philadelphia Flyers, but spent most of his career in the Swedish Elitserien and Allsvenskan playing for Västerås IK. He also played in the Finnish SM-liiga with Jokerit and the Swiss National League A with SC Bern and HC Davos.

== Achievements ==
- Gold medal winner at the Winter Olympics in 1994
- NLA 2001/02 Top goal scorer

== Awards ==
- Swedish All-Star Team 1994
- AHL All Star Team (1996–97)

== International play ==
Olympic medal record

Men's Ice hockey
Gold medal – first place	1994 Lillehammer	Team competition

Juhlin played a total of 80 games for the Swedish national team.

== Career statistics ==
=== Regular season and playoffs ===
			Regular season					Playoffs
Season	Team	League	GP	G	A	Pts	PIM	GP	G	A	Pts	PIM
1987–88	VIK Hockey	SWE.2	2	0	0	0	0	3	2	1	3	0
1988–89	Västerås IK	SWE U20	30	29	13	42	—	—	—	—	—	—
1988–89	Västerås IK	SEL	6	0	0	0	0	—	—	—	—	—
1988–89	Västerås IK	Allsv	5	0	0	0	0	4	1	0	1	0
1989–90	Västerås IK	SEL	35	10	13	23	18	2	0	0	0	0
1990–91	Västerås IK	SEL	40	13	9	22	24	4	3	1	4	0
1991–92	Västerås IK	SEL	39	15	12	27	40	—	—	—	—	—
1992–93	Västerås IK	SEL	34	14	12	26	28	3	0	1	1	2
1993–94	Västerås IK	SEL	40	15	16	31	20	4	1	1	2	2
1994–95	Västerås IK	SEL	11	5	9	14	8	—	—	—	—	—
1994–95	Philadelphia Flyers	NHL	42	4	3	7	6	13	1	0	1	2
1995–96	Philadelphia Flyers	NHL	14	3	3	6	17	—	—	—	—	—
1995–96	Hershey Bears	AHL	14	5	2	7	8	1	0	0	0	0
1996–97	Philadelphia Phantoms	AHL	78	31	60	91	24	9	7	6	13	4
1997–98	Jokerit	SM-l	47	19	9	28	20	7	5	0	5	4
1998–99	Jokerit	SM-l	54	17	12	29	30	3	0	0	0	2
1999–2000	Jokerit	SM-l	12	0	0	0	4	—	—	—	—	—
1999–2000	SC Bern	NLA	33	17	14	31	12	5	0	1	1	4
2000–01	SC Bern	NLA	44	19	24	43	12	10	5	8	13	10
2001–02	SC Bern	NLA	44	27	26	53	24	6	3	5	8	6
2002–03	SC Bern	NLA	43	17	24	41	16	11	1	6	7	2
2003–04	SC Bern	NLA	7	0	1	1	0	—	—	—	—	—
2004–05	SC Bern	NLA	5	0	3	3	2	—	—	—	—	—
2004–05	Västerås IK Ungdom	Allsv	28	14	19	33	49	5	0	1	1	4
2005–06	VIK Västerås HK	Allsv	38	13	16	29	18	—	—	—	—	—
2005–06	HC Davos	NLA	—	—	—	—	—	11	3	6	9	8
2006–07	VIK Västerås HK	Allsv	42	15	22	37	18	2	0	0	0	0
2007–08	VIK Västerås HK	Allsv	43	17	21	38	26	9	2	1	3	6
2008–09	VIK Västerås HK	Allsv	45	10	15	25	20	9	2	2	4	2
SEL totals			205	72	71	143	138	13	4	3	7	4
SM-l totals			113	36	21	57	54	10	5	0	5	6
NLA totals			176	80	92	172	66	43	12	26	38	30

=== International ===
Year	Team	Event	GP	G	A	Pts	PIM
1990	Sweden	WJC	6	1	0	1	0
1993	Sweden	WC	8	2	1	3	4
1994	Sweden	OG	8	7	1	8	16
1994	Sweden	WC	1	0	0	0	0
1996	Sweden	WCH	4	0	0	0	2
Senior totals			21	9	2	11	22
