= Roger Hansson (ice hockey) =

Swedish ice hockey player

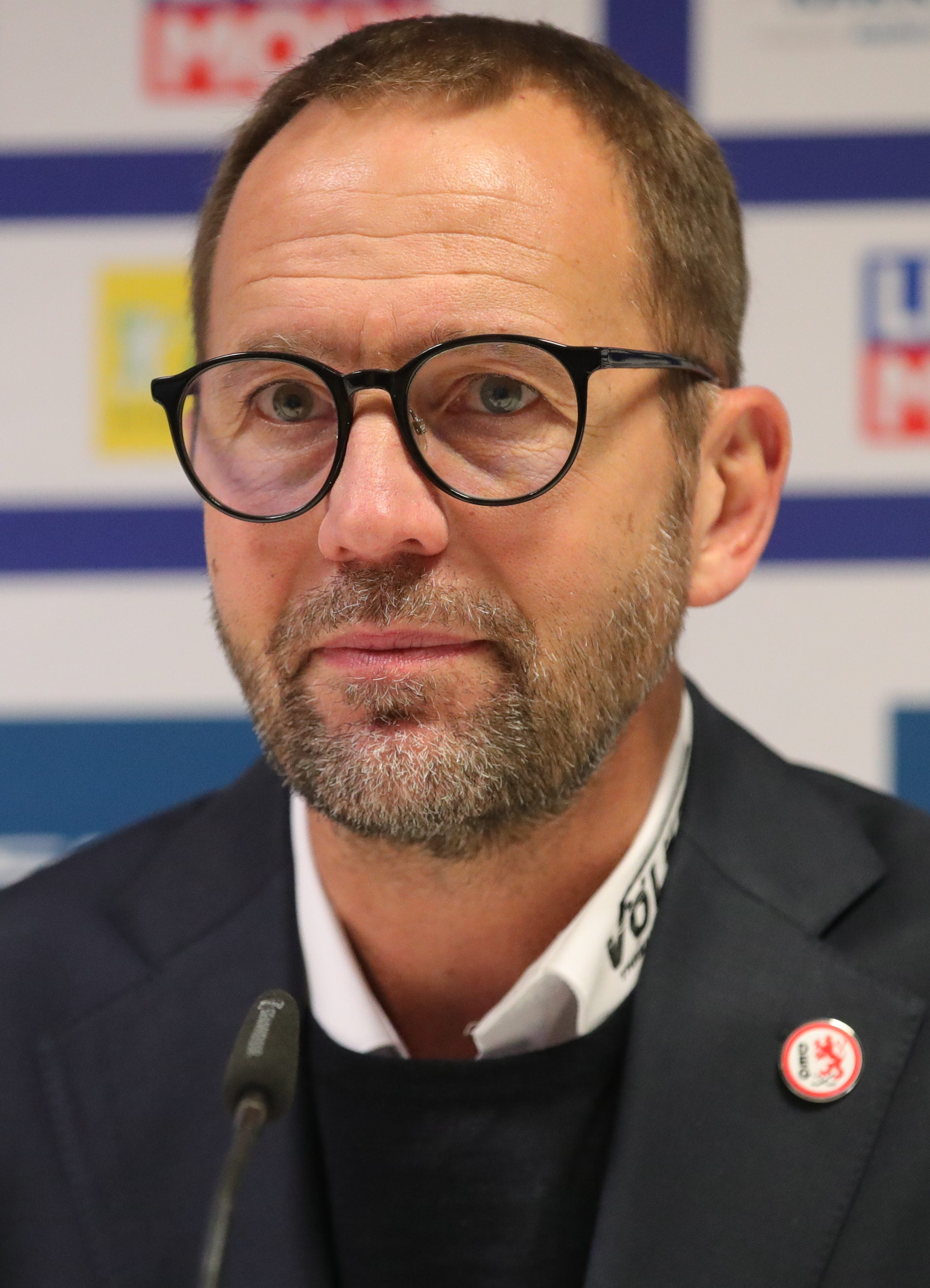
- Born: July 13, 1967 (age 58) Helsingborg, Sweden
- Height: 6 ft 2 in (188 cm)
- Weight: 190 lb (86 kg; 13 st 8 lb)
- Position: Winger
- Shot: Left
- Played for: Malmö IF; Kassel Huskies
- National team: Sweden
- NHL draft: 213th overall, 1987; Vancouver Canucks
- Playing career: 1984–2003

Olympic medal record

Men's Ice hockey
Gold medal – first place	1994 Lillehammer	Ice hockey

Roger Kent Hansson (born July 13, 1967 in Helsingborg, Sweden) is a Swedish ice hockey player. He won a gold medal at the 1994 Winter Olympics, won the Swedish championships twice and became runner-up in the German championships with the Kassel Huskies in 1997.

== Career statistics ==
=== Regular season and playoffs ===
			Regular season					Playoffs
Season	Team	League	GP	G	A	Pts	PIM	GP	G	A	Pts	PIM
1984–85	Rögle BK	SWE II	22	4	6	10	0	—	—	—	—	—
1985–86	Rögle BK	SWE II	21	7	7	14	8	—	—	—	—	—
1986–87	Rögle BK	SWE II	28	20	11	31	6	3	1	1	2	0
1987–88	Rögle BK	SWE II	36	31	16	47	20	2	5	1	6	0
1988–89	Rögle BK	SWE II	36	33	15	48	20	3	0	1	1	2
1989–90	Rögle BK	SWE II	32	22	18	40	18	10	7	8	15	2
1990–91	Rögle BK	SWE II	31	27	22	49	25	13	15	3	18	6
1991–92	Malmö IF	SEL	36	12	13	25	10	10	4	3	7	4
1992–93	Malmö IF	SEL	32	9	8	17	10	6	1	1	2	2
1993–94	Malmö IF	SEL	39	12	12	24	30	11	7	4	11	18
1994–95	Malmö IF	SEL	38	8	14	22	16	9	4	2	6	2
1995–96	Malmö IF	SEL	38	16	8	24	10	5	2	0	2	0
1996–97	Kassel Huskies	DEL	49	20	22	42	6	10	2	5	7	2
1997–98	Kassel Huskies	DEL	43	12	14	26	12	4	0	2	2	2
1998–99	Kassel Huskies	DEL	36	6	9	15	12	—	—	—	—	—
1999–2000	Kassel Huskies	DEL	46	11	10	21	10	8	1	0	1	2
2000–01	Kassel Huskies	DEL	59	4	14	18	12	8	1	2	3	6
2001–02	Rögle BK	SWE II	46	15	16	31	46	—	—	—	—	—
2002–03	Rögle BK	SWE II	16	5	8	13	8	10	0	7	7	8
SEL totals			183	57	55	112	76	41	18	10	28	26
DEL totals			233	53	69	122	52	30	4	9	13	12

=== International ===
Year	Team	Event	GP	G	A	Pts	PIM
1987	Sweden	WJC	7	3	2	5	4
1992	Sweden	WC	5	3	1	4	0
1994	Sweden	OG	8	5	2	7	4
1994	Sweden	WC	8	3	3	6	4
Senior totals			29	11	8	19	8
