= Marty Dallman =

Austrian-Canadian ice hockey player

- Born: February 15, 1963 (age 63) Niagara Falls, Ontario, Canada
- Height: 5 ft 10 in (178 cm)
- Weight: 188 lb (85 kg; 13 st 6 lb)
- Position: Centre
- Shot: Right
- Played for: Toronto Maple Leafs; EHC Olten; Wiener EV; EK Zell am See; EC Graz; HC Fribourg-Gottéron; CE Wien; Nottingham Panthers
- National team: Austria
- NHL draft: 81st overall, 1981; Los Angeles Kings
- Playing career: 1984–1999

Marty Dallman (born February 15, 1963) is a Canadian-born former professional Austrian ice hockey player.

== Career ==
Dallman played six games in the National Hockey League (NHL) for the Toronto Maple Leafs during the 1987–88 and 1988–89 seasons. Most of his career, which lasted from 1984 to 1999, was spent in the Austrian Hockey League and other European and minor leagues. Internationally he played for the Austrian national team at the 1994 Winter Olympics in Lillehammer.

== Personal life ==
Dallman is the uncle of Kevin Dallman, who also played in the NHL and then in the Kontinental Hockey League.

== Career statistics ==
=== Regular season and playoffs ===
			Regular season					Playoffs
Season	Team	League	GP	G	A	Pts	PIM	GP	G	A	Pts	PIM
1979–80	Niagara Falls Canucks	GHL	44	32	28	70	37	—	—	—	—	—
1979–80	Niagara Falls Flyers	OMJHL	2	0	0	0	0	4	7	5	12	10
1980–81	Rensselaer Polytechnic Institute	ECAC	22	9	10	19	8	—	—	—	—	—
1981–82	Rensselaer Polytechnic Institute	ECAC	28	22	18	40	27	—	—	—	—	—
1982–83	Rensselaer Polytechnic Institute	ECAC	29	21	29	50	42	—	—	—	—	—
1983–84	Rensselaer Polytechnic Institute	ECAC	38	20	24	44	32	—	—	—	—	—
1984–85	New Haven Nighthawks	AHL	78	18	39	57	26	—	—	—	—	—
1985–86	New Haven Nighthawks	AHL	69	23	33	56	92	5	0	4	4	4
1986–87	Newmarket Saints	AHL	42	24	24	48	44	—	—	—	—	—
1986–87	Baltimore Skipjacks	AHL	6	0	1	1	0	—	—	—	—	—
1987–88	Toronto Maple Leafs	NHL	2	0	1	1	0	—	—	—	—	—
1987–88	Newmarket Saints	AHL	76	50	39	89	52	—	—	—	—	—
1988–89	Toronto Maple Leafs	NHL	4	0	0	0	0	—	—	—	—	—
1988–89	Newmarket Saints	AHL	37	26	20	46	24	—	—	—	—	—
1989–90	EHC Olten	NLA	2	0	0	0	0	—	—	—	—	—
1989–90	Wiener EV	AUT	34	36	33	69	89	—	—	—	—	—
1990–91	Wiener EV	AUT	39	39	18	57	70	—	—	—	—	—
1991–92	Wiener EV	AUT	39	46	23	69	39	—	—	—	—	—
1992–93	EK Zell am See	AUT	43	30	17	47	46	—	—	—	—	—
1993–94	EC Graz	AUT	57	35	43	78	59	—	—	—	—	—
1994–95	HC Fribourg-Gottéron	NLA	4	1	1	2	4	—	—	—	—	—
1994–95	South Carolina Stingrays	ECHL	22	11	16	27	22	6	5	9	14	4
1995–96	CE Wien	AUT	33	22	29	51	67	—	—	—	—	—
1996–97	Nottingham Panthers	BISL	40	24	32	56	28	8	5	3	8	10
1997–98	Nottingham Panthers	BISL	33	13	20	33	12	6	3	2	5	0
1998–99	Abilene Aviators	WPHL	59	30	37	67	48	3	2	2	4	0
AHL totals			308	141	156	297	238	5	0	4	4	4
AUT totals			245	208	163	371	370	—	—	—	—	—
NHL totals			6	0	1	1	0	—	—	—	—	—

=== International ===
Year	Team	Event	GP	G	A	Pts	PIM
1993	Austria	WC	6	0	1	1	10
1994	Austria	OLY	7	4	4	8	8
Senior totals			13	4	5	9	18

== Awards and honors ==
Award	Year
All-ECAC Hockey Second Team	1983–84
