= Sylvain Girard (ice hockey) =

French ice hockey player (born 1972)

Personal information
- Nationality: French
- Born: 19 May 1972 (age 54) Maisons-Alfort, France

Sport
- Sport: Ice hockey

Sylvain Girard (born 19 May 1972) is a French former ice hockey forward. He competed in the men's tournament at the 1994 Winter Olympics.
