= Jörg Handrick =

German ice hockey player

Personal information
- Nationality: German
- Born: 20 July 1968 (age 56); Landshut, Germany

Sport
- Sport: Ice hockey

Jörg Handrick (born 20 July 1968) is a German ice hockey player. He competed in the men's tournament at the 1994 Winter Olympics.
