= Derek Mayer =

Canadian ice hockey player and coach

- Born: May 21, 1967 (age 58) Rossland, British Columbia, Canada
- Height: 6 ft 0 in (183 cm)
- Weight: 206 lb (93 kg; 14 st 10 lb)
- Position: Defence
- Shot: Right
- Played for: Ottawa Senators; Tappara; Eisbären Berlin
- National team: Canada
- NHL draft: 43rd overall, 1986; Detroit Red Wings
- Playing career: 1989–2006

Medal record

Representing Canada

Ice Hockey

Olympic Games
Silver medal – second place	1994 Lillehammer	

Derek Christopher Mayer (born May 21, 1967) is a Canadian professional ice hockey coach and former professional ice hockey player. He played 17 games for the Ottawa Senators of the National Hockey League (NHL). He was also a member of the Canadian team at the 1994 Olympics. He played most of his professional playing career in Germany and currently is an assistant coach for Starbulls Rosenheim in Germany's third-tier Oberliga.

== Playing career ==
Drafted by the Detroit Red Wings in the 1986 NHL draft (43 overall), he graduated from the University of Denver in 1988 and then spent some time in the Canadian national team system. Mayer then signed with AHL's Adirondack Red Wings for the 1989-90 season, where he spent a total of three seasons, interrupted and followed by stints with the San Diego Gulls of the IHL (1990–91 and 1991–92).

Mayer made his NHL debut with the Ottawa Senators during the 1993-94 season. He played a total of 17 games in the NHL.

He played at the 1993 World Championships and won silver at the 1994 Olympic Games in Lillehammer, Norway, with the Canadian national team.

From 1996 to 2001, Mayer played for Eisbären Berlin in the German top-flight Deutsche Eishockey Liga, followed by four years at EC Bad Tölz in the German second division and one year at German Oberliga side SC Riessersee.

He retired in 2006.

== Career statistics ==
=== Regular season and playoffs ===
			Regular season					Playoffs
Season	Team	League	GP	G	A	Pts	PIM	GP	G	A	Pts	PIM
1984–85	Penticton Knights	BCHL	42	6	30	36	137	5	0	3	3	4
1985–86	University of Denver	WCHA	44	2	7	9	42	—	—	—	—	—
1986–87	University of Denver	WCHA	38	5	17	22	87	—	—	—	—	—
1987–88	University of Denver	WCHA	34	5	16	21	82	—	—	—	—	—
1988–89	Canada	Intl	58	3	13	16	81	—	—	—	—	—
1989–90	Adirondack Red Wings	AHL	62	4	26	30	56	5	0	6	6	4
1990–91	San Diego Gulls	IHL	31	9	24	33	31	—	—	—	—	—
1990–91	Adirondack Red Wings	AHL	21	4	9	13	20	2	0	1	1	0
1991–92	Adirondack Red Wings	AHL	25	4	11	15	31	—	—	—	—	—
1991–92	San Diego Gulls	IHL	30	7	16	23	47	4	0	0	0	20
1992–93	Canada	Intl	64	12	28	40	108	—	—	—	—	—
1993–94	Canada	Intl	57	5	17	22	75	—	—	—	—	—
1993–94	Ottawa Senators	NHL	17	2	2	4	8	—	—	—	—	—
1994–95	Atlanta Knights	IHL	55	7	17	24	77	5	1	1	2	10
1995–96	Tappara	Liiga	50	17	8	25	96	4	3	4	7	18
1995–96	Canada	Intl	12	1	4	5	25	—	—	—	—	—
1996–97	Eisbären Berlin	DEL	47	7	14	21	136	8	0	3	3	14
1997–98	Eisbären Berlin	DEL	48	7	12	19	77	10	2	2	4	2
1998–99	Eisbären Berlin	DEL	41	6	12	18	34	8	0	0	0	6
1999–2000	Eisbären Berlin	DEL	40	2	7	9	44	—	—	—	—	—
2000–01	Eisbären Berlin	DEL	20	1	3	4	46	—	—	—	—	—
2001–02	Tölzer Löwen	DEU II	46	10	23	33	79	3	0	0	0	4
2002–03	Tölzer Löwen	DEU II	49	2	18	20	123	—	—	—	—	—
2003–04	Tölzer Löwen	DEU II	43	1	18	19	128	—	—	—	—	—
2004–05	Tölzer Löwen	DEU II	38	6	19	25	75	—	—	—	—	—
2005–06	SC Riessersee	DEU III	49	11	37	48	178	3	0	1	1	8
AHL totals			108	12	46	58	107	7	0	7	7	4
IHL totals			116	23	57	80	155	9	1	1	2	30
DEL totals			196	23	48	71	337	26	2	5	7	22

=== International ===
Year	Team	Event	GP	G	A	Pts	PIM
1993	Canada	WC	8	0	0	0	2
1994	Canada	OG	8	1	2	3	18
1996	Canada	WC	8	1	1	2	2
Senior totals			24	2	3	5	22

== Coaching career ==
Mayer began his coaching career in 2006 at Eisbären Berlin Juniors and signed on 24 June 2009 a contract as Assistant Coach of Nürnberg Ice Tigers. In June 2015, Mayer joined the coaching staff of EHC Red Bull München in Germany as an assistant.
