= Christian Due-Boje =

Swedish ice hockey player

- Born: 12 October 1966 (age 58); Sweden
- Height: 5 ft 6 in (168 cm)
- Weight: 169 lb (77 kg; 12 st 1 lb)
- Position: Defence
- Shot: Left
- Played for: Hammarby IF; Djurgårdens IF; Södertälje SK; Star Bulls Rosenheim; Malmö Redhawks
- National team: Sweden
- Playing career: 1983–2002

Olympic medal record

Men's Ice hockey
Gold medal – first place	1994 Lillehammer	Ice hockey

Christian Carl Due-Boje (born 12 October 1966) is a Swedish former ice hockey player.

He began his career with Hammarby IF in 1983 and joined Djurgårdens IF in 1986. He remained with the team until 1997 where he moved to Södertälje SK for one season before moving to Germany's Deutsche Eishockey Liga with Star Bulls Rosenheim. After two seasons, he returned to Elitserien with the Malmö Redhawks for two more seasons before retiring in 2002. He won a gold medal with Sweden at the 1994 Winter Olympics.

== Career statistics ==
=== Regular season and playoffs ===
			Regular season					Playoffs
Season	Team	League	GP	G	A	Pts	PIM	GP	G	A	Pts	PIM
1983–84	Hammarby IF	SWE II	27	5	6	11	22	9	0	1	1	4
1984–85	Hammarby IF	SEL	33	3	7	10	42	—	—	—	—	—
1985–86	Hammarby IF	SWE II	32	3	4	7	40	—	—	—	—	—
1986–87	Djurgårdens IF	SEL	28	4	2	6	53	2	0	0	0	4
1987–88	Djurgårdens IF	SEL	35	5	6	11	16	3	1	0	1	0
1988–89	Djurgårdens IF	SEL	26	6	4	10	10	8	2	2	4	6
1989–90	Djurgårdens IF	SEL	35	3	8	11	28	8	1	1	2	8
1990–91	Djurgårdens IF	SEL	40	2	10	12	44	7	2	1	3	4
1991–92	Djurgårdens IF	SEL	40	1	8	9	52	10	1	2	3	12
1992–93	Djurgårdens IF	SEL	38	4	5	9	60	—	—	—	—	—
1993–94	Djurgårdens IF	SEL	34	2	7	9	48	6	0	1	1	8
1994–95	Djurgårdens IF	SEL	38	1	6	7	50	3	0	0	0	0
1995–96	Djurgårdens IF	SEL	37	3	10	13	38	4	0	0	0	4
1996–97	Djurgårdens IF	SEL	41	2	10	12	57	4	2	0	2	2
1997–98	Södertälje SK	SEL	42	2	7	9	40	—	—	—	—	—
1998–99	Starbulls Rosenheim	DEL	49	9	12	21	55	—	—	—	—	—
1999–2000	Starbulls Rosenheim	DEL	50	7	29	36	28	—	—	—	—	—
2000–01	MIF Redhawks	SEL	45	2	2	4	67	6	1	1	2	8
2001–02	MIF Redhawks	SEL	40	2	2	4	44	5	0	0	0	4
SEL totals			552	42	94	136	649	66	10	8	18	60
DEL totals			99	16	41	57	83	—	—	—	—	—

=== International ===
Year	Team	Event	GP	G	A	Pts	PIM
1984	Sweden	EJC	5	2	1	3	10
1985	Sweden	WJC	7	1	0	1	20
1986	Sweden	WJC	7	0	1	1	2
1994	Sweden	OG	8	1	0	1	12
