= Pierrick Maïa =

French ice hockey player

Personal information
- Nationality: French
- Born: 16 February 1967 (age 58) Caen, France

Sport
- Sport: Ice hockey

Pierrick Maïa (born 16 February 1967) is a French ice hockey player. He competed in the men's tournament at the 1994 Winter Olympics.
