= Marko Palo =

Finnish ice hockey player

- Born: 26 September 1967 (age 59) Jyväskylä, Finland
- Played for: Ässät; Espoo Blues; HPK; HV 71
- Playing career: 1985–2006

Marko Mikael "Adder" Palo (born 26 September 1967 in Jyväskylä, Finland) is a retired professional ice hockey player who played in the SM-liiga. He played for Ässät, Espoo Blues, and HPK, and won the 1995 Swedish championship with HV 71. He was inducted into the Finnish Hockey Hall of Fame in 2005. Palo is also known as adder, because of his striped ice hockey socks.

During the 1994–1995 season he made up a fearsome duo together with Esa Keskinen for HV71.

== Career statistics ==
=== Regular season and playoffs ===
			Regular season					Playoffs
Season	Team	League	GP	G	A	Pts	PIM	GP	G	A	Pts	PIM
1985–86	HPK	FIN Jr	20	2	6	8	36	—	—	—	—	—
1985–86	HPK	FIN II	2	0	0	0	2	—	—	—	—	—
1986–87	HPK	FIN II	39	4	4	8	6	—	—	—	—	—
1987–88	HPK	FIN Jr	21	6	10	16	16	—	—	—	—	—
1987–88	HPK	FIN II	32	6	5	11	13	—	—	—	—	—
1988–89	HPK	Liiga	37	6	11	17	30	—	—	—	—	—
1989–90	HPK	Liiga	40	7	8	15	20	—	—	—	—	—
1990–91	HPK	Liiga	41	6	7	13	30	8	0	3	3	0
1991–92	HPK	Liiga	43	3	14	17	24	—	—	—	—	—
1992–93	HPK	Liiga	47	17	15	32	12	12	7	4	11	2
1993–94	HPK	Liiga	48	25	22	47	14	—	—	—	—	—
1994–95	HV71	SEL	37	16	13	29	24	13	5	7	12	16
1995–96	Malmö IF	SEL	40	10	9	19	28	5	2	0	2	12
1996–97	HPK	Liiga	44	6	19	25	57	10	3	7	10	4
1997–98	Kiekko-Espoo	Liiga	48	13	18	31	12	8	1	0	1	0
1998–99	HPK	Liiga	53	10	10	20	43	2	1	0	1	0
1999–2000	HPK	Liiga	51	8	11	19	30	7	4	1	5	2
1999–2000	HC Slovnaft Vsetín	ELH	3	1	0	1	0	—	—	—	—	—
2000–01	HPK	Liiga	54	5	21	26	34	—	—	—	—	—
2001–02	Ässät	Liiga	56	5	16	21	30	—	—	—	—	—
Liiga totals			562	111	172	283	336	47	16	15	31	8
SEL totals			77	26	22	48	52	18	7	7	14	28

=== International ===
Year	Team	Event	GP	G	A	Pts	PIM
1993	Finland	WC	6	0	1	1	4
1994	Finland	OG	8	2	3	5	4
1994	Finland	WC	8	1	2	3	4
1995	Finland	WC	8	1	0	1	2
Senior totals			30	4	6	10	14
