= Mika Alatalo =

Finnish ice hockey player

- Born: June 11, 1971 (age 55) Oulu, FIN
- Height: 6 ft 0 in (183 cm)
- Weight: 196 lb (89 kg; 14 st 0 lb)
- Position: Left wing
- Shot: Left
- Serie A team Former teams: HC Pustertal Wölfe; KooKoo; Lukko; TPS; Luleå HF; Phoenix Coyotes; HC Thurgau; Herlev Hornets
- National team: Finland
- NHL draft: 203rd overall, 1990; Winnipeg Jets
- Playing career: 1988–2009
Medal record
Men's ice hockey
Representing Finland
Olympic Games
Bronze medal – third place	1994 Lillehammer	Team competition

Mika Antero Alatalo (born June 11, 1971 in Oulu, Finland) is a former professional ice hockey forward.

== Playing career ==
He played 152 games in the National Hockey League for the Phoenix Coyotes. He has most recently played for Herlev Hornets and formerly for HC Thurgau. He last played for Hockey Club Pustertal-Val Pusteria in Italy's Serie A.

== Career statistics ==
=== Regular season and playoffs ===
			Regular season					Playoffs
Season	Team	League	GP	G	A	Pts	PIM	GP	G	A	Pts	PIM
1988–89	KooKoo	Liiga	34	8	6	14	10	—	—	—	—	—
1989–90	KooKoo	Liiga	41	3	5	8	22	—	—	—	—	—
1990–91	Lukko	Liiga	39	10	1	11	10	—	—	—	—	—
1991–92	Lukko	Liiga	43	20	17	37	32	2	0	0	0	2
1992–93	Lukko	Liiga	48	16	19	35	38	3	0	0	0	0
1993–94	Lukko	Liiga	45	19	15	34	77	9	2	2	4	4
1994–95	TPS	Liiga	44	23	13	36	59	13	2	5	7	8
1995–96	TPS	Liiga	49	19	18	37	44	11	3	4	7	8
1996–97	Luleå HF	SEL	50	19	18	37	54	10	2	3	5	22
1997–98	Luleå HF	SEL	45	14	10	24	56	2	0	0	0	0
1998–99	TPS	Liiga	53	14	23	37	44	10	6	3	9	6
1999–2000	Phoenix Coyotes	NHL	82	10	17	27	36	5	0	0	0	2
2000–01	Phoenix Coyotes	NHL	70	7	12	19	22	—	—	—	—	—
2001–02	TPS	Liiga	56	20	22	42	95	8	1	1	2	12
2002–03	TPS	Liiga	55	13	16	29	68	7	3	2	5	28
2003–04	TPS	Liiga	37	12	14	26	32	13	3	2	5	8
2004–05	TPS	Liiga	55	11	15	26	28	6	0	1	1	0
2005–06	TPS	Liiga	35	1	8	9	18	2	1	0	1	0
2006–07	TPS	Liiga	47	7	11	18	28	2	0	0	0	0
2007–08	HC Thurgau	SUI II	36	17	28	45	56	—	—	—	—	—
2008–09	Herlev Hornets	DNK	19	7	6	13	28	—	—	—	—	—
2008–09	HC Pustertal	ITA	8	0	2	2	6	—	—	—	—	—
Liiga totals			681	196	203	399	605	86	21	20	41	76

=== International ===
Year	Team	Event	GP	G	A	Pts	PIM
1989	Finland	EJC	6	3	5	8	8
1989	Finland	WJC	7	1	3	4	8
1990	Finland	WJC	7	2	1	3	0
1991	Finland	WJC	6	4	3	7	12
1993	Finland	WC	6	1	0	1	2
1994	Finland	OG	7	2	1	3	2
1994	Finland	WC	6	1	0	1	8
1998	Finland	WC	10	1	1	2	4
Junior totals			26	10	12	22	28
Senior totals			29	5	2	7	16
