= Roger Johansson =

Swedish ice hockey player

- Born: 17 April 1967 (age 59) Ljungby, Sweden
- Height: 6 ft 3 in (191 cm)
- Weight: 194 lb (88 kg; 13 st 12 lb)
- Position: Defence
- Shot: Left
- Played for: Calgary Flames; Chicago Blackhawks; Färjestads BK; Leksands IF
- National team: Sweden
- NHL draft: 80th overall, 1985; Calgary Flames
- Playing career: 1983–2001

Olympic medal record

Men's ice hockey
Gold medal – first place	1994 Lillehammer	Ice hockey

Roger Per Arne Johansson (born 17 April 1967) is a Swedish former professional ice hockey player.

Roger Johansson joined Swedish Elite League club Färjestads BK in 1986, when he left Troja-Ljungby. He played with Färjestad until 1989, winning one Swedish Championship with them in 1988. In 1989 he signed with the Calgary Flames of the NHL who had drafted him in 1985 as the 80th pick overall. He played two seasons, a total of 73 games, with the Flames before returning home to Sweden and signing with Leksands IF. But he returned to the Flames in 1992 after only one season with Leksand in Swedish Elite League. Despite playing 77 games and scoring a total of 20 points with the Flames that season, Johansson decided to move back to Sweden once more, and once more he signed with Leksands IF. He played with Leksand during the 1993/94 season. Johansson also started the 1994/95 season with Leksand. But when the NHL lockout ended on 11 January 1995, Johansson signed for the Chicago Blackhawks. Johansson played only a total of 11 games that season with the Blackhawks and decided to move back home to Sweden, this time for good. When he returned to Sweden he signed with Färjestads BK who he had played with in the 80's. Johansson stayed with Färjestad until 2001, when he was forced to retire due to an injury. But before retiring he won two new Swedish Championships in 1997 and 1998.

He has represented Sweden in three IIHF World Championships (1994, 1996 and 1997), the 1996 World Cup of Hockey and in the 1994 Olympics in Lillehammer. In Lillehammer he won the Olympic Gold Medal.

== Career statistics ==
=== Regular season and playoffs ===
			Regular season					Playoffs
Season	Team	League	GP	G	A	Pts	PIM	GP	G	A	Pts	PIM
1983–84	IF Troja/Ljungby	SWE II	11	2	2	4	12	—	—	—	—	—
1984–85	IF Troja/Ljungby	SWE II	30	1	6	7	20	9	0	4	4	8
1985–86	IF Troja/Ljungby	SWE II	32	5	16	21	42	—	—	—	—	—
1986–87	Färjestad BK	SEL	31	6	11	17	20	7	1	1	2	8
1987–88	Färjestad BK	SEL	24	3	11	14	20	9	1	6	7	12
1988–89	Färjestad BK	SEL	40	5	15	20	38	2	0	0	0	0
1989–90	Calgary Flames	NHL	35	0	5	5	48	—	—	—	—	—
1990–91	Calgary Flames	NHL	38	4	13	17	47	—	—	—	—	—
1991–92	Leksands IF	SEL	22	3	9	12	42	—	—	—	—	—
1991–92	Leksands IF	Allsv	26	10	16	26	28	—	—	—	—	—
1992–93	Calgary Flames	NHL	77	4	16	20	62	5	0	1	1	2
1993–94	Leksands IF	SEL	38	6	15	21	56	4	0	1	1	8
1994–95	Leksands IF	SEL	7	0	0	0	12	—	—	—	—	—
1994–95	Chicago Blackhawks	NHL	11	1	0	1	6	—	—	—	—	—
1995–96	Färjestad BK	SEL	34	3	5	8	46	8	3	1	4	16
1996–97	Färjestad BK	SEL	46	8	15	23	52	14	3	5	8	34
1997–98	Färjestad BK	SEL	46	12	27	39	44	10	2	7	9	8
1998–99	Färjestad BK	SEL	39	11	11	22	42	4	0	1	1	4
1999–2000	Färjestad BK	SEL	43	5	13	18	58	7	0	1	1	12
2000–01	Färjestad BK	SEL	31	3	6	9	34	—	—	—	—	—
SWE II totals			73	8	24	32	74	9	0	4	4	8
SEL totals			401	65	138	203	464	65	10	23	33	102
NHL totals			161	9	34	43	163	5	0	1	1	2

=== International ===
Year	Team	Event	GP	G	A	Pts	PIM
1985	Sweden	EJC	5	0	0	0	0
1986	Sweden	WJC	7	1	1	2	8
1987	Sweden	WJC	7	2	4	6	2
1994	Sweden	OG	8	2	0	2	8
1994	Sweden	WC	6	1	1	2	6
1996	Sweden	WCH	3	0	0	0	0
1996	Sweden	WC	6	1	1	2	6
1997	Sweden	WC	10	0	1	1	16
Junior totals			19	3	5	8	10
Senior totals			35	3	5	8	34
