= Franck Saunier =

French ice hockey player

Personal information
- Nationality: French
- Born: 14 April 1966 (age 58); Gap, France

Sport
- Sport: Ice hockey

Franck Saunier (born 14 February 1966) is a French ice hockey player. He competed in the men's tournament at the 1994 Winter Olympics.
