= David Sacco =

American ice hockey player (born 1970)

- Born: July 31, 1970 (age 55) Malden, Massachusetts, U.S.
- Height: 6 ft 1 in (185 cm)
- Weight: 190 lb (86 kg; 13 st 8 lb)
- Position: Center
- Shot: Right
- Played for: Toronto Maple Leafs; Mighty Ducks of Anaheim; SC Bern
- National team: United States
- NHL draft: 195th overall, 1988; Toronto Maple Leafs
- Playing career: 1993–1998

David Anthony Sacco (born July 31, 1970) is an American former professional ice hockey player.

== Career ==
Drafted 195th overall by the Toronto Maple Leafs in the 1988 NHL entry draft, Sacco played 35 games in the National Hockey League between 1994 and 1996 with the Maple Leafs and Mighty Ducks of Anaheim, scoring a total of five goals and 13 assists for 18 points and collecting 22 penalty minutes. He represented the United States as part of the US national ice hockey team at the 1994 Winter Olympics in Lillehammer. He spent one season in Switzerland playing for SC Bern before retiring.

== Personal life ==
Sacco was born in Malden, Massachusetts, and raised in Medford, Massachusetts. His older brother, Joe Sacco, also played in the NHL and is currently an assistant coach for the New York Rangers.

== Career statistics ==
=== Regular season and playoffs ===
			Regular season					Playoffs
Season	Team	League	GP	G	A	Pts	PIM	GP	G	A	Pts	PIM
1987–88	Medford High School	HS-MA	—	—	—	—	—	—	—	—	—	—
1988–89	Boston University	HE	35	14	29	43	40	—	—	—	—	—
1989–90	Boston University	HE	3	0	4	4	2	—	—	—	—	—
1990–91	Boston University	HE	40	21	40	61	24	—	—	—	—	—
1991–92	Boston University	HE	35	14	33	47	30	—	—	—	—	—
1992–93	Boston University	HE	40	25	37	62	86	—	—	—	—	—
1993–94	St. John's Maple Leafs	AHL	5	3	1	4	2	—	—	—	—	—
1993–94	Toronto Maple Leafs	NHL	4	1	1	2	4	—	—	—	—	—
1993–94	United States National Team	Intl	32	8	20	28	88	—	—	—	—	—
1994–95	Mighty Ducks of Anaheim	NHL	8	0	2	2	0	—	—	—	—	—
1994–95	San Diego Gulls	IHL	45	11	25	36	57	4	3	1	4	0
1995–96	Baltimore Bandits	AHL	25	14	16	30	18	2	0	1	1	4
1995–96	Mighty Ducks of Anaheim	NHL	23	4	10	14	18	—	—	—	—	—
1996–97	Baltimore Bandits	AHL	51	18	38	56	30	1	0	2	2	0
1997–98	SC Bern	NLA	16	5	12	17	47	—	—	—	—	—
NHL totals			35	5	13	18	22	—	—	—	—	—

=== International ===
Year	Team	Event	GP	G	A	Pts	PIM
1993	United States	WC	6	0	0	0	0
1994	United States	OLY	8	3	5	8	12
Senior totals			14	3	5	8	12

== Awards and honors ==
Award	Year
All-Hockey East First Team	1991–92
AHCA East First-Team All-American	1991–92
All-Hockey East First Team	1992–93
AHCA East First-Team All-American	1992–93
Hockey East All-Tournament Team	1993

Brother of Joe
