= Jiří Kučera =

Czech ice hockey player and coach

- Born: March 28, 1966 (age 58); Plzeň, Czechoslovakia
- Height: 6 ft 0 in (183 cm)
- Weight: 180 lb (82 kg; 12 st 12 lb)
- Position: Center
- Shot: Left
- Played for: Czech Extraliga; HC Plzen; Dukla Jihlava; SM-liiga; Tappara; Elitserien; Luleå HF; Nationalliga A EHC Kloten
- National team: Czechoslovakia and Czech Republic
- NHL draft: 152nd overall, 1987; Pittsburgh Penguins
- Playing career: 1983–2001

Jiří Kučera (born March 28, 1966) is a Czech professional ice hockey coach and former player. He is currently the head coach of HC Litvinov. During his playing career he played for HC Plzen and Dukla Jihlava in his home country and for Tappara in Finland, Luleå HF in Sweden, and EHC Kloten in Switzerland. He also represented the national team of either Czechoslovakia or Czech Republic eight times in the Ice Hockey World Championships and once in the Olympic Games.

== Honors ==
- Ice Hockey World Championships: Gold (1996)
- Ice Hockey World Championships: Bronze (1987, 1989, 1990, 1993)
- Swedish national championship: gold (1996)

== Career statistics ==
=== Regular season and playoffs ===
			Regular season					Playoffs
Season	Team	League	GP	G	A	Pts	PIM	GP	G	A	Pts	PIM
1983–84	TJ Škoda Plzeň	TCH U20	30	28	39	67		—	—	—	—	—
1983–84	TJ Škoda Plzeň	TCH	12	0	0	0	0	—	—	—	—	—
1984–85	TJ Škoda Plzeň	TCH	40	6	6	12	4	—	—	—	—	—
1985–86	ASD Dukla Jihlava	TCH	30	6	4	10	10	—	—	—	—	—
1985–86	ASD Dukla Jihlava B	CZE.2		3				—	—	—	—	—
1986–87	ASD Dukla Jihlava	TCH	34	10	10	20	18	9	3	2	5
1987–88	TJ Škoda Plzeň	TCH	32	15	15	30	22	—	—	—	—	—
1988–89	TJ Škoda Plzeň	TCH	32	16	13	29	22	8	4	2	6
1989–90	TJ Škoda Plzeň	TCH	47	13	24	37	16	—	—	—	—	—
1990–91	Tappara	SM-l	44	23	34	57	26	3	0	2	2	4
1991–92	Tappara	SM-l	44	22	20	42	8	—	—	—	—	—
1992–93	Tappara	SM-l	48	22	32	54	20	—	—	—	—	—
1993–94	Tappara	SM-l	47	16	26	42	37	10	7	5	12	4
1994–95	Luleå HF	SEL	40	15	12	27	24	9	2	7	9	8
1995–96	Luleå HF	SEL	39	15	19	34	18	12	4	6	10	6
1996–97	HC ZKZ Plzeň	ELH	43	10	23	33	28	—	—	—	—	—
1997–98	EHC Kloten	NDA	38	8	22	30	18	7	1	2	3	2
1998–99	Luleå HF	SEL	45	7	21	28	52	5	2	1	3	4
1999–2000	Luleå HF	SEL	47	13	21	34	34	9	1	1	2	6
2000–01	Luleå HF	SEL	34	10	8	18	8	—	—	—	—	—
TCH totals			227	66	72	138	92	17	7	4	11	—
SM-l totals			183	83	112	195	91	13	7	7	14	8
SEL totals			205	60	81	141	136	35	9	15	24	24

=== International ===
Year	Team	Event	GP	G	A	Pts	PIM
1984	Czechoslovakia	EJC
1985	Czechoslovakia	WJC	7	2	3	5	0
1986	Czechoslovakia	WJC	7	5	5	10	8
1987	Czechoslovakia	WC	10	0	2	2	11
1987	Czechoslovakia	CC	6	0	0	0	2
1989	Czechoslovakia	WC	10	2	2	4	4
1990	Czechoslovakia	WC	8	4	1	5	8
1991	Czechoslovakia	WC	10	0	1	1	2
1993	Czech Republic	WC	7	0	5	5	2
1994	Czech Republic	OG	8	6	2	8	4
1994	Czech Republic	WC	6	4	0	4	0
1995	Czech Republic	WC	8	1	0	1	2
1996	Czech Republic	WC	8	5	2	7	6
1996	Czech Republic	WCH	2	0	0	0	2
Senior totals			83	22	15	37	43
