= Stéphane Arcangeloni =

French ice hockey player

Personal information
- Nationality: French
- Born: 6 June 1972 (age 52); Grenoble, France

Sport
- Sport: Ice hockey

Stéphane Arcangeloni (born 6 June 1972) is a French ice hockey player. He competed in the men's tournament at the 1994 Winter Olympics.
