= Todd Hlushko =

Canadian ice hockey player (born 1970)

- Born: February 7, 1970 (age 56) Guelph, Ontario, Canada
- Height: 5 ft 11 in (180 cm)
- Weight: 200 lb (91 kg; 14 st 4 lb)
- Position: Left wing
- Shot: Left
- Played for: Philadelphia Flyers; Calgary Flames; Pittsburgh Penguins
- National team: Canada
- NHL draft: 240th overall, 1990; Washington Capitals
- Playing career: 1990–2007

Medal record

Men's ice hockey

Representing Canada

Olympic Games
Silver medal – second place	1994 Lillehammer	

World Championships
Bronze medal – third place	1995 Sweden	

Todd Bradley Hlushko (born February 7, 1970) is a Canadian former professional ice hockey left winger. He is currently the Director of Player Development/Director of Pro Scouting for German team Adler Mannheim.

Hlushko played in the National Hockey League (NHL) for the Philadelphia Flyers, Calgary Flames and Pittsburgh Penguins. He played with the Canadian national team and was a member of Canada's silver medal-winning team at the 1994 Winter Olympics and bronze medal squad at the 1995 World Championship.

== Playing career ==
Hlushko played with three teams in three seasons in his junior hockey career. He began with the Guelph Jr. B's in 1987–88 where he scored 36 goals and 83 points in 44 games. He moved up to the Ontario Hockey League (OHL) the following season where he recorded 46 points. A 70-point season followed in 1989–90 where he split the campaign with the relocated Owen Sound Platers and the London Knights. Though the NHL Central Scouting Bureau had Hlushko rated as a potential sixth round pick at the 1990 NHL entry draft, he was not selected until the 12th round. The Washington Capitals drafted him with the 240th overall pick; only 12 players were selected after him.

The Capitals assigned Hluskho to their American Hockey League (AHL) affiliate, the Baltimore Skipjacks. He played two seasons in Baltimore, recording 23 points in 1990–91 then improving to 51 points in 1991–92. Hlushko left the Capitals organization in 1992 to join the Canadian national team in the hopes of playing at the 1994 Winter Olympics. He toured with the national team for two seasons, scoring 44 goals in 113 games combined, He made the Olympic team and recorded five goals in eight games, including two in a victory over France. Canada reached the gold medal game, but were forced to settle for the silver medal by Sweden, who won 3–2 in a shootout.

Immediately following the Olympics, Hlushko signed a contract with the Philadelphia Flyers for the remainder of the 1993–94 season. He was assigned to the AHL's Hershey Bears where he scored six goals in nine games, but was also recalled to play two games with the Flyers. Hlushko made his NHL debut on March 10, 1994, against the Ottawa Senators and scored his first goal on March 13 against the Tampa Bay Lightning. The Flyers allowed Hlushko to go to free agency following the season, and he was signed by the Calgary Flames. He spent the majority of the 1994–95 season with the AHL's Saint John Flames where he recorded 22 goals in 46 games, but appeared in two regular season contests with Calgary and made his NHL playoff debut. Hlishko also played in the 1995 World Championship where he scored four goals in eight games to help Canada win the bronze medal.

The 1995–96 season was similar as Hlushko appeared in only four NHL games with the Flames; he played 35 with Saint John and missed 25 games due to a shoulder injury. In 1996–97, he played his only full season in the NHL. Hlushko appeared in 58 games for Calgary and recorded seven goals and 11 assists. He was again relegated to Saint John for the majority of 1997–98. Following the season, Hlushko was traded. On June 17, 1998, he was sent, along with German Titov, to the Pittsburgh Penguins in exchange for Ken Wregget and Dave Roche. Hlushko was again assigned to the minor leagues. He spent the 1998–99 season with the Grand Rapids Griffins of the International Hockey League (IHL) where he had 24 goals and 50 points. He was recalled to Pittsburgh during the 1999 Stanley Cup Playoffs and appeared in two games.

Following the season, Hlushko moved to Europe where he played six seasons in the German Deutsche Eishockey Liga and represented Canada in smaller tournaments. He returned to Canada in 2006 where, after playing two seasons of senior hockey with the Dundas Real McCoys, Hlushko retired as a player.

== Post-playing career ==
In May 2018, Hlushko signed on as scout and team representative for North America with Adler Mannheim of the top tier Deutsche Eishockey Liga, where he had played from 2000–2005.

Hlushko has worked as a host and analyst for Sportsnet, including the daily news program Sportsnet Central.

== Career statistics ==
=== Regular season and playoffs ===
			Regular season					Playoffs
Season	Team	League	GP	G	A	Pts	PIM	GP	G	A	Pts	PIM
1988–89	Guelph Platers	OHL	66	28	18	46	71	7	5	3	8	18
1989–90	Owen Sound Platers	OHL	25	9	17	26	31	—	—	—	—	—
1989–90	London Knights	OHL	40	27	17	44	39	6	2	4	6	10
1990–91	Baltimore Skipjacks	AHL	66	9	14	23	55	—	—	—	—	—
1991–92	Baltimore Skipjacks	AHL	74	16	35	51	113	—	—	—	—	—
1992–93	Canadian National Team	Intl	58	22	26	48	10	—	—	—	—	—
1993–94	Canadian National Team	Intl	55	22	6	28	61	—	—	—	—	—
1993–94	Hershey Bears	AHL	9	6	0	6	4	6	2	1	3	4
1993–94	Philadelphia Flyers	NHL	2	1	0	1	0	—	—	—	—	—
1994–95	Calgary Flames	NHL	2	0	1	1	2	1	0	0	0	2
1994–95	Saint John Flames	AHL	46	22	10	32	36	4	2	2	4	22
1995–96	Calgary Flames	NHL	4	0	0	0	6	—	—	—	—	—
1995–96	Saint John Flames	AHL	35	14	13	27	70	16	8	1	9	26
1996–97	Calgary Flames	NHL	58	7	11	18	49	—	—	—	—	—
1997–98	Calgary Flames	NHL	13	0	1	1	27	—	—	—	—	—
1997–98	Saint John Flames	AHL	33	10	14	24	48	21	13	4	17	61
1998–99	Grand Rapids Griffins	IHL	82	24	26	50	78	—	—	—	—	—
1998–99	Pittsburgh Penguins	NHL	—	—	—	—	—	2	0	0	0	0
1999–00	Kölner Haie	DEL	55	13	28	41	78	10	5	2	7	20
2000–01	Adler Mannheim	DEL	54	18	19	37	126	10	1	1	2	16
2001–02	Adler Mannheim	DEL	49	10	27	37	40	12	1	2	3	14
2002–03	Adler Mannheim	DEL	52	15	13	28	26	7	2	1	3	12
2003–04	Adler Mannheim	DEL	48	9	12	21	28	6	0	0	0	40
2004–05	Hannover Scorpions	DEL	41	3	9	12	83	—	—	—	—	—
2005–06	Saint John Scorpions	CEHL	4	2	7	9	0	—	—	—	—	—
2006–07	Dundas Real McCoys	OHA Sr.	16	8	20	28	33	—	—	—	—	—
2007–08	Dundas Real McCoys	OHA Sr.	24	8	22	30	10	3	0	3	3	0
AHL totals			263	77	86	163	326	47	25	8	33	113
DEL totals			299	68	108	176	381	45	9	6	15	102
NHL totals			79	8	13	21	84	3	0	0	0	2

=== International ===
Year	Team	Event	GP	G	A	Pts	PIM
1994	Canada	OG	8	5	0	5	6
1995	Canada	WC	8	4	0	4	4
International totals			16	9	0	9	10
