= Michael Puschacher =

Austrian ice hockey player

Personal information
- Nationality: Austrian
- Born: 15 September 1968 (age 57) Klagenfurt, Austria

Sport
- Sport: Ice hockey

Michael Puschacher (born 15 September 1968) is an Austrian ice hockey player. He competed in the men's tournament at the 1994 Winter Olympics.
