= Sergei Abramov (ice hockey, born 1959) =

Russian hockey player

Personal information
- Nationality: Russian
- Born: 15 September 1959 (age 66) Kazan, Russia
- Height: 1.80 m (5 ft 11 in)
- Weight: 94 kg (207 lb)

Sport
- Sport: Ice hockey

Sergei Mikhaylovich Abramov (born 15 September 1959) is a Russian ice hockey player. He competed in the 1994 Winter Olympics.
