= Jaromír Dragan =

Slovak ice hockey player

- Born: 14 September 1963 (age 61); Liptovský Mikuláš, Czechoslovakia
- Height: 6 ft 0 in (183 cm)
- Weight: 190 lb (86 kg; 13 st 8 lb)
- Position: Goaltender
- Caught: Left
- Played for: HC Košice; HC Slovan Bratislava; HC Zlín
- National team: Czechoslovakia and Slovakia
- Playing career: 1986–2000

Jaromír Dragan (born 14 September 1963) is a Slovak former professional ice hockey goaltender.

Dragan spent the majority of his career with HC Košice, initially in the Czechoslovak Extraliga before following the team to the Slovak Extraliga after the dissolution of Czechoslovakia. He also played for HC Slovan Bratislava and HC Zlín.

Dragan was a member Czechoslovak national team at the 1992 Winter Olympics though he did not play a game during the tournament. He also competed in the 1994 Winter Olympics for Slovakia.

He lives in Košice at Sídlisko Ťahanovce.
