= Klaus Merk =

German ice hockey player

Personal information
- Nationality: German
- Born: 26 April 1967 (age 57); Augsburg, Germany

Sport
- Sport: Ice hockey

Klaus Merk (born 26 April 1967) is a German ice hockey player. He competed in the men's tournaments at the 1994 Winter Olympics and the 1998 Winter Olympics.
