= Andrei Zuev =

Russian ice hockey player

Andrei Aleksandrovich Zuev (Russian: Андреӣ Александрович Зуев); (born May 18, 1964) is a retired Russian ice hockey goaltender. He was inducted into the Russian and Soviet Hockey Hall of Fame in 1993.

== Career ==
=== Club career ===
In 1983, he began his career with the Metallurg Chelyabinsk in the Soviet Championship League. From 1986-1989, he played Automobilist Sverdlovsk. He then played for the Traktor Chelyabinsk and Mechel Chelyabinsk in the Russian Superleague. He retired in 2004 after two seasons in the Vysshaya Liga, the second level of Russian hockey.

=== International career ===
Zuev represented Russia at the international level. He participated in the 1994 Winter Olympics, where Russia took fourth place. He won a gold medal with Russia at the 1993 World Ice Hockey Championships. He was also selected for the 1995 World Ice Hockey Championships.
