= Jim Marthinsen =

Norwegian ice hockey player

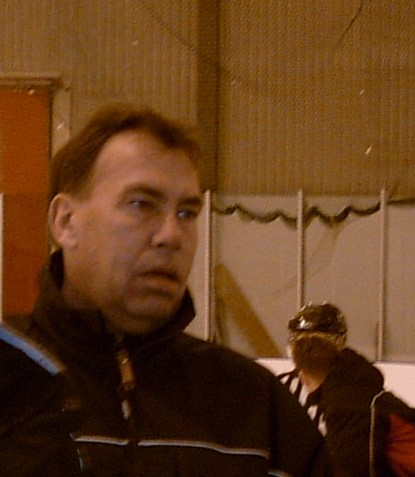
- Born: 15 April 1956 (age 68); Oslo, NOR
- Height: 6 ft 2 in (188 cm)
- Weight: 196 lb (89 kg; 14 st 0 lb)
- Position: Goaltender
- Caught: Left
- Played for: Vålerenga Ishockey; Storhamar IL; Trondheim Black Panthers
- National team: Norway
- Playing career: 1979–1997

Jim Marthinsen (born 15 April 1956) is a retired Norwegian hockey goaltender who last played for Storhamar Hockey in the 1996/97 season and for the Norwegian national team. He participated at the Winter Olympics in 1980, 1984, 1992 and 1994. He was seven times Norwegian Champion with the club Vålerenga, and three times with Storhamar. He was awarded Gullpucken as best Norwegian ice hockey player two times.
