= Eduard Hartmann (ice hockey) =

Slovak ice hockey player and coach

- Born: June 5, 1965 (age 60) Skalica, Czechoslovakia
- Height: 6 ft 0 in (183 cm)
- Weight: 181 lb (82 kg; 12 st 13 lb)
- Position: Goaltender
- Caught: Left
- Played for: HK Dukla Trenčín; HC Kometa Brno; Eisbären Berlin; HK Spišská Nová Ves
- National team: Czechoslovakia and Slovakia
- Playing career: 1983–1998

Eduard Hartmann (born 5 June 1965 in Skalica, Czechoslovakia) is a Slovak ice hockey coach and former international ice hockey goaltender. He is the elder brother of ice hockey forward Richard Hartmann.

== Playing career ==
=== Club ===
Eduard Hartmann is known primarily for his membership at the HK Dukla Trenčín, with which he won the 1993–94 season championship title. He played for HK Dukla Trenčín from 1986 to 1994 with the exception of the 1991–92 season when he was at the HC Kometa Brno. After one season with the German Eisbären Berlin in the 1994–95 season, Hartmann returned to his home club. Finally, he played for HK Spišská Nová Ves between 1996 and 1998.

=== International ===
He took part at the 1994 Winter Olympics in Lillehammer, Norway, where his national team ranked at 6th place. In the same year, the national team was successful with him at the World Cup to advance to the Division B from the Division C after defeating Kazakhstan, Ukraine and Belarus. In total, he capped 41 times for the national team.

== Coaching career ==
After retiring from active playing career, he served in various posts at the HK Dukla Trenčín as coach of the junior team and manager of the youth team. In the 2008–09 season, he was appointed chairman of the board and general manager of the club. Hartmann appeared also regularly on the television channel STV as commentator for ice hockey games. Currently, he is serving as assistant coach of the Turkey women's and the head coach of the men's and men's U-20 national teams.
