= Raimund Hilger =

German ice hockey player

Personal information
- Nationality: German
- Born: 13 December 1965 (age 59); Aising, Bavaria, West Germany

Sport
- Sport: Ice hockey

Raimund Hilger (born 13 December 1965) is a German ice hockey player. He competed in the men's tournaments at the 1992 Winter Olympics and the 1994 Winter Olympics.
