= Werner Kerth =

Austrian ice hockey player

Personal information
- Nationality: Austrian
- Born: 7 December 1966 (age 59) Kapfenberg, Austria

Sport
- Sport: Ice hockey

Werner Kerth (born 7 December 1966) is an Austrian ice hockey player. He competed in the men's tournaments at the 1988 Winter Olympics and the 1994 Winter Olympics.
