= Cato Tom Andersen =

Norwegian former ice hockey defenceman

- Born: 17 June 1967 (age 58) Oslo, Norway
- Height: 5 ft 11 in (180 cm)
- Weight: 190 lb (86 kg; 13 st 8 lb)
- Position: Defence
- Played for: Furuset; Vålerenga
- National team: Norway
- Playing career: 1987–1997

Cato Tom Andersen (born 17 June 1967) is a Norwegian former ice hockey defenceman. He was born in Oslo, Norway.

Andersen played in the Norwegian Eliteserien for Furuset and Vålerenga. He also played for the Norwegian national ice hockey team, playing in four Ice Hockey World Championships as well as the 1988 and 1994 Winter Olympics.
