= Håkan Algotsson =

Swedish ice hockey player

- Born: 5 August 1966 (age 60) Hässleholm, Sweden
- Height: 5 ft 10 in (178 cm)
- Weight: 176 lb (80 kg; 12 st 8 lb)
- Position: Goaltender
- Caught: Left
- Played for: Västra Frölunda; Star Bulls Rosenheim
- National team: Sweden
- Playing career: 1983–2001

Håkan Ulf Göran Algotsson (born 5 August 1966) is a retired Swedish ice hockey goaltender.

Algotsson began his career with his hometown Tyringe SoSS in 1983. In 1988, Algotsson joined Västra Frölunda and would spend the next eleven seasons with the team. In 1999, he moved to Germany's Deutsche Eishockey Liga with Star Bulls Rosenheim for one season before returning to Frölunda for one final season before retiring in 2001. Algotssons final season was Henrik Lundqvist first season with Frölunda.

Algotsson was the starting goalie for team Sweden during the 1994 Winter Olympics in Lillehammer, but left the team prior to the quarterfinal against Germany, this was because his wife went into labor. Sweden went on to win their first olympic gold in hockey with Tommy Salo replacing Algotsson.
