= 1990–91 Czechoslovak Extraliga season =

Czechoslovak ice hockey season

The 1990–91 Czechoslovak Extraliga season was the 48th season of the Czechoslovak Extraliga, the top level of ice hockey in Czechoslovakia. 14 teams participated in the league, and Dukla Jihlava won the championship.

== Regular season ==
Pl.	Team	GP	W	T	L	GF–GA	Pts
1.	Dukla Jihlava	52	29	10	13	187:122	68
2.	Dukla Trenčín	52	32	4	16	244:187	68
3.	CHZ Litvínov	52	30	5	17	222:177	65
4.	VSŽ Košice	52	27	5	20	196:167	59
5.	TJ Škoda Plzeň	52	26	6	20	167:150	58
6.	Sparta ČKD Praha	52	22	10	20	161:148	54
7.	AC ZPS Zlín	52	22	9	21	204:197	53
8.	Slovan CHZJD Bratislava	52	22	9	21	164:187	53
9.	Tesla Pardubice	52	21	9	22	213:211	51
10.	TJ Vítkovice	52	21	7	24	181:187	49
11.	DS Olomouc	52	19	5	28	146:191	43
12.	Poldi SONP Kladno	52	18	5	29	150:171	41
13.	AC Nitra	52	16	7	29	154:224	39
14.	Motor České Budějovice	52	9	9	34	145:224	27

== Playoffs ==
=== Semifinal ===
- Dukla Jihlava – VSŽ Košice 8:4 (2:2,3:1,3:1)
- Dukla Jihlava – VSŽ Košice 7:0 (1:0,2:0,4:0)
- VSŽ Košice – Dukla Jihlava 3:4 (0:1,1:0,2:3)
- Dukla Trenčín – HC CHZ Litvínov 3:5 (0:1,2:2,1:2)
- Dukla Trenčín – HC CHZ Litvínov 4:1 (1:1,3:0,0:0)
- HC CHZ Litvínov – Dukla Trenčín 4:3 SN (2:0,0:2,1:1,0:0)
- HC CHZ Litvínov – Dukla Trenčín 6:5 PP (2:3,1:2,2:0,1:0)

=== Final ===
- Dukla Jihlava – HC CHZ Litvínov 6:3 (4:2,1:0,1:1)
- Dukla Jihlava – HC CHZ Litvínov 3:2 (2:0,1:2,0:0)
- HC CHZ Litvínov – Dukla Jihlava 5:1 (2:1,1:0,2:0)
- HC CHZ Litvínov – Dukla Jihlava 0:7 (0:5,0:1,0:1)

=== 3rd place ===
- Dukla Trenčín – VSŽ Košice 6:4 (1:1,3:0,2:3)
- Dukla Trenčín – VSŽ Košice 4:2 (0:0,2:1,2:1)
