= Slovakia at the 2002 Winter Olympics =

- IOC code: SVK
- NOC: Slovak Olympic and Sports Committee
- Website: www.olympic.sk (in Slovak)

in Salt Lake City
- Competitors: 49 (38 men, 11 women) in 10 sports
- Flag bearer: Róbert Petrovický (ice hockey)
- Medals: Gold 0 Silver 0 Bronze 0 Total 0

Winter Olympics appearances (overview)
- 1994; 1998; 2002; 2006; 2010; 2014; 2018; 2022; 2026

Other related appearances
- Czechoslovakia (1924–1992)

Slovakia competed at the 2002 Winter Olympics in Salt Lake City, United States.

== Alpine skiing ==
Men

| Athlete | Event | Race 1 | Race 2 | Total | |
| Athlete | Event | Time | Time | Time | Rank |
|---|---|---|---|---|---|
| Ivan Heimschild | Downhill | | | 1:46.36 | 47 |
| Ivan Heimschild | Super-G | | | 1:27.74 | 28 |
| Ivan Heimschild | Giant Slalom | DNF | – | DNF | – |
| Ivan Heimschild | Slalom | DNF | – | DNF | – |
| Michal Rajčan | Slalom | 52.73 | 55.93 | 1:48.66 | 19 |

Men's combined

| Athlete | Downhill | Slalom | | Total | |
| Athlete | Time | Time 1 | Time 2 | Total time | Rank |
|---|---|---|---|---|---|
| Michal Rajčan | DSQ | – | – | DSQ | – |
| Ivan Heimschild | 1:44.89 | 52.72 | 59.17 | 3:36.78 | 24 |

Women

| Athlete | Event | Race 1 | Race 2 | Total | |
| Athlete | Event | Time | Time | Time | Rank |
|---|---|---|---|---|---|
| Veronika Zuzulová | Giant Slalom | 1:20.54 | 1:18.09 | 2:38.63 | 32 |
| Veronika Zuzulová | Slalom | DNF | – | DNF | – |

== Biathlon ==
Men

| Event | Athlete | Misses ^{1} | Time | Rank |
|---|---|---|---|---|
| 10 km sprint | Marek Matiaško | 1 | 27:12.6 | 39 |
| 12.5 km pursuit ^{2} | Marek Matiaško | 5 | 37:26.0 | 43 |

| Event | Athlete | Time | Misses | Adjusted time ^{3} | Rank |
|---|---|---|---|---|---|
| 20 km | Marek Matiaško | 53:37.8 | 4 | 57:37.8 | 52 |

Women

| Event | Athlete | Misses ^{1} | Time | Rank |
|---|---|---|---|---|
| 7.5 km sprint | Tatiana Kutlíková | 5 | 25:18.3 | 64 |
| 7.5 km sprint | Anna Murínová | 1 | 23:10.0 | 35 |
| 7.5 km sprint | Soňa Mihoková | 1 | 22:32.1 | 21 |
| 7.5 km sprint | Martina Jašicová-Schwarzbacherová-Halinárová | 0 | 22:11.9 | 13 |
| 10 km pursuit ^{4} | Anna Murínová | 3 | 35:14.6 | 35 |
| 10 km pursuit ^{4} | Soňa Mihoková | 3 | 33:57.4 | 21 |
| 10 km pursuit ^{4} | Martina Jašicová-Schwarzbacherová-Halinárová | 2 | 33:26.4 | 18 |

| Event | Athlete | Time | Misses | Adjusted time ^{3} | Rank |
|---|---|---|---|---|---|
| 15 km | Anna Murínová | 49:39.2 | 5 | 54:39.2 | 53 |
| 15 km | Marcela Pavkovčeková | 48:03.7 | 4 | 52:03.7 | 33 |
| 15 km | Soňa Mihoková | 47:00.7 | 3 | 50:00.7 | 14 |
| 15 km | Martina Jašicová-Schwarzbacherová-Halinárová | 46:47.5 | 2 | 48:47.5 | 9 |

Women's 4 × 7.5 km relay

| Athletes | Race | | |
| Athletes | Misses ^{1} | Time | Rank |
|---|---|---|---|
| Martina Jašicová-Schwarzbacherová-Halinárová; Anna Murínová; Marcela Pavkovčeková; Soňa Mihoková | 1 | 1'30:11.5 | 5 |

^{1} A penalty loop of 150 metres had to be skied per missed target.
^{2} Starting delay based on 10 km sprint results.
^{3} One minute added per missed target.
^{4} Starting delay based on 7.5 km sprint results.

== Bobsleigh ==
Men

| Sled | Athletes | Event | Run 1 | | Run 2 | | Run 3 | | Run 4 | | Total | |
| Sled | Athletes | Event | Time | Rank | Time | Rank | Time | Rank | Time | Rank | Time | Rank |
|---|---|---|---|---|---|---|---|---|---|---|---|---|
| SVK-1 | Milan Jagnešák; Róbert Kresťanko | Two-man | 49.00 | 30 | 48.96 | 30 | 49.28 | 30 | 48.87 | 29 | 3:16.11 | 30 |

| Sled | Athletes | Event | Run 1 | | Run 2 | | Run 3 | | Run 4 | | Total | |
| Sled | Athletes | Event | Time | Rank | Time | Rank | Time | Rank | Time | Rank | Time | Rank |
|---|---|---|---|---|---|---|---|---|---|---|---|---|
| SVK-1 | Milan Jagnešák; Braňo Prieložný; Marián Vanderka; Róbert Kresťanko | Four-man | 47.80 | 24 | 47.88 | 24 | 51.10 | 29 | 48.64 | 22 | 3:15.42 | 24 |

== Cross-country skiing ==
Men

Pursuit

| Athlete | 10 km C | | 10 km F pursuit^{1} | |
| Athlete | Time | Rank | Time | Final rank |
|---|---|---|---|---|
| Martin Bajčičák | 27:06.9 | 23 Q | 27:30.0 | 50 |
| Ivan Bátory | 26:57.2 | 16 Q | 25:05.7 | 25 |

| Event | Athlete | Race | |
| Event | Athlete | Time | Rank |
|---|---|---|---|
| 15 km C | Martin Bajčičák | 39:39.4 | 24 |
| 15 km C | Ivan Bátory | 39:32.0 | 21 |
| 30 km F | Martin Bajčičák | 1'16:08.5 | 32 |
| 50 km C | Ivan Bátory | 2'17:25.2 | 25 |
| 50 km C | Martin Bajčičák | 2'13:07.9 | 12 |

^{1} Starting delay based on 10 km C. results.
C = Classical style, F = Freestyle

Women

Pursuit

| Athlete | 5 km C | | 5 km F pursuit^{2} | |
| Athlete | Time | Rank | Time | Final rank |
|---|---|---|---|---|
| Jaroslava Bukvajová | 14:42.9 | 58 | did not advance | |

| Event | Athlete | Race | |
| Event | Athlete | Time | Rank |
|---|---|---|---|
| 10 km C | Jaroslava Bukvajová | 31:50.5 | 46 |

^{2} Starting delay based on 5 km C. results.
C = Classical style, F = Freestyle

== Figure skating ==
Women

| Athlete | Points | SP | FS | Rank |
|---|---|---|---|---|
| Zuzana Babiaková | 31.0 | 20 | 21 | 21 |

Pairs

| Athletes | Points | SP | FS | Rank |
|---|---|---|---|---|
| Oľga Beständigová; Jozef Beständig | 25.5 | 17 | 17 | 17 |

== Ice hockey ==
=== Men's tournament ===
==== Preliminary round - group A ====
Top team (shaded) advanced to the first round.

| Team | GP | W | L | T | GF | GA | GD | Pts |
|---|---|---|---|---|---|---|---|---|
| Germany | 3 | 3 | 0 | 0 | 10 | 3 | +7 | 6 |
| Latvia | 3 | 1 | 1 | 1 | 11 | 12 | −1 | 3 |
| Austria | 3 | 1 | 2 | 0 | 7 | 9 | −2 | 2 |
| Slovakia | 3 | 0 | 2 | 1 | 8 | 12 | −4 | 1 |

All times are local (UTC-7).

| 9 February 2002; 16:00 | Germany | 3 – 0 (0–0, 0–2, 0–1) | Slovakia | E Center, West Valley City; Attendance: 8,504 |

| 10 February 2002; 19:00 | Latvia | 6 – 6 (2–2, 2–4, 2–0) | Slovakia | E Center, West Valley City; Attendance: 8,377 |

| 12 February 2002; 16:00 | Slovakia | 2 – 3 (1–1, 1–1, 0–1) | Austria | E Center, West Valley City; Attendance: 8,362 |

==== Consolation round ====
13th place match

| 14 February 2002; 21:00 | Slovakia 13th | 7 – 1 (1–0, 2–0, 4–1) | France | Peaks Ice Arena, Provo; Attendance: 5,956 |

- Team Roster

- Ľuboš Bartečko
- Pavol Demitra
- Michal Handzuš
- Marián Hossa
- Richard Kapuš
- Richard Lintner
- Ivan Majeský
- Dušan Milo
- Jaroslav Obšut
- Žigmund Pálffy
- Ján Pardavý
- Rastislav Pavlikovský
- Richard Pavlikovský
- Róbert Petrovický
- Pavol Rybár
- Miroslav Šatan
- Richard Šechný
- Peter Smrek
- Rastislav Staňa
- Jozef Stümpel
- Jaroslav Török
- Ľubomír Višňovský

== Luge ==
Men

| Athlete | Run 1 | | Run 2 | | Run 3 | | Run 4 | | Total | |
| Athlete | Time | Rank | Time | Rank | Time | Rank | Time | Rank | Time | Rank |
|---|---|---|---|---|---|---|---|---|---|---|
| Ľubomír Mick | 47.207 | 42 | 46.333 | 35 | 45.803 | 31 | 46.475 | 38 | 3:05.818 | 35 |
| Jaroslav Slavík | 45.104 | 18 | 45.017 | 13 | 44.762 | 15 | 45.180 | 19 | 3:00.063 | 16 |

(Men's) Doubles

| Athletes | Run 1 | | Run 2 | | Total | |
| Athletes | Time | Rank | Time | Rank | Time | Rank |
|---|---|---|---|---|---|---|
| Ľubomír Mick; Walter Marx | 43.248 | 6 | 43.458 | 10 | 1:26.706 | 9 |

Women

| Athlete | Run 1 | | Run 2 | | Run 3 | | Run 4 | | Total | |
| Athlete | Time | Rank | Time | Rank | Time | Rank | Time | Rank | Time | Rank |
|---|---|---|---|---|---|---|---|---|---|---|
| Veronika Sabolová | 44.021 | 15 | 44.113 | 24 | 43.947 | 19 | 44.231 | 24 | 2:56.312 | 21 |

== Nordic combined ==
Men's sprint

Events:

- large hill ski jumping
- 7.5 km cross-country skiing (Start delay, based on ski jumping results.)

| Athlete | Ski Jumping | | Cross-country time | Total rank |
| Athlete | Points | Rank | Cross-country time | Total rank |
|---|---|---|---|---|
| Michal Pšenko | 92.4 | 36 | 20:07.3 | 39 |

Men's individual

Events:

- normal hill ski jumping
- 15 km cross-country skiing (Start delay, based on ski jumping results.)

| Athlete | Ski Jumping | | Cross-country time | Total rank |
| Athlete | Points | Rank | Cross-country time | Total rank |
|---|---|---|---|---|
| Michal Pšenko | 232.0 | 14 | 46:06.2 | 38 |

== Short track speed skating ==
Men

| Athlete | Event | Round one | | Quarter finals | | Semi finals | | Finals | |
| Athlete | Event | Time | Rank | Time | Rank | Time | Rank | Time | Final rank |
|---|---|---|---|---|---|---|---|---|---|
| Matúš Užák | 500 m | 44.499 | 3 | did not advance | | | | | |
| Matúš Užák | 1000 m | 2:17.608 | 4 | did not advance | | | | | |
| Matúš Užák | 1500 m | 2:22.557 | 4 | did not advance | | | | | |

== Snowboarding ==
Women's parallel giant slalom

| Athlete | Qualifying | | Round one | Quarter final | Semi final | Final | Rank |
| Athlete | Time | Rank | Round one | Quarter final | Semi final | Final | Rank |
|---|---|---|---|---|---|---|---|
| Jana Šedová | 49.92 | 14 Q | (Italy) Lidia Trettel L | did not advance | | | |
