= Slovakia at the 2006 Winter Olympics =

- IOC code: SVK
- NOC: Slovak Olympic and Sports Committee
- Website: www.olympic.sk (in Slovak)

in Turin
- Competitors: 58 (45 men, 13 women) in 9 sports
- Flag bearers: Walter Marx (opening); Martin Bajčičák (closing)
- Medals Ranked 21st: Gold 0 Silver 1 Bronze 0 Total 1

Winter Olympics appearances (overview)
- 1994; 1998; 2002; 2006; 2010; 2014; 2018; 2022; 2026

Other related appearances
- Czechoslovakia (1924–1992)

Slovakia competed at the 2006 Winter Olympics in Turin, Italy.

== Medalists ==
Židek's silver medal was the first Winter Olympic medal won by Slovakia as an independent nation.

Medal	Name	Sport	Event	Date
Silver	Radoslav Židek	Snowboarding	Men's snowboard cross	16 February

== Alpine skiing ==
The top finish for the six-person Slovak alpine team came from Veronika Zuzulová, who finished 15th in the women's combined.

Athlete	Event	Final				
Athlete	Event	Run 1	Run 2	Run 3	Total	Rank
Jaroslav Babušiak	Men's downhill	n/a			1:57.45	45
Jaroslav Babušiak	Men's super-G	n/a			1:35.41	40
Jaroslav Babušiak	Men's slalom	58.51	53.55	n/a	1:52.06	24
Jaroslav Babušiak	Men's combined	1:43.32	48.86	48.60	3:20.78	27
Jana Gantnerová	Women's downhill	n/a			2:04.60	36
Jana Gantnerová	Women's super-G	n/a			1:38.40	48
Jana Gantnerová	Women's giant slalom	1:06.73	did not finish			
Jana Gantnerová	Women's combined	did not finish				
Ivan Heimschild	Men's downhill	did not finish				
Ivan Heimschild	Men's super-G	n/a			1:36.58	46
Ivan Heimschild	Men's slalom	59.67	54.31	n/a	1:53.98	26
Ivan Heimschild	Men's combined	1:43.12	48.13	47.16	3:18.41	25
Eva Huckova	Women's downhill	n/a			2:05.32	37
Eva Huckova	Women's super-G	disqualified				
Eva Huckova	Women's giant slalom	1:05.24	1:13.07	n/a	2:18.31	28
Eva Huckova	Women's slalom	did not finish				
Eva Huckova	Women's combined	did not finish				
Sona Maculova	Women's downhill	n/a			2:03.63	35
Sona Maculova	Women's super-G	n/a			1:37.87	44
Sona Maculova	Women's giant slalom	1:05.77	1:12.84	n/a	2:18.61	29
Sona Maculova	Women's slalom	did not finish				
Sona Maculova	Women's combined	40.53	45.63	1:34.09	3:00.25	23
Veronika Zuzulová	Women's slalom	44.53	48.00	n/a	1:32.53	22
Veronika Zuzulová	Women's combined	39.68	43.67	1:33.28	2:56.63	15

Note: In the men's combined, run 1 is the downhill, and runs 2 and 3 are the slalom. In the women's combined, run 1 and 2 are the slalom, and run 3 the downhill.

== Biathlon ==
Marek Matiaško had the best result out of the Slovak biathlon team, with a surprising 5th-place finish in the men's individual. He missed only one shot, and the resultant time penalty meant that he fell short of the medals.

Men

Athlete	Event	Final		
Athlete	Event	Time	Misses	Rank
Pavol Hurajt	Men's sprint	28:17.8	1	30
Pavol Hurajt	Men's pursuit	38:20.67	3	24
Pavol Hurajt	Men's individual	58:49.6	3	29
Matej Kazár	Men's sprint	29:29.4	1	58
Matej Kazár	Men's pursuit	42:46.6	1	52
Marek Matiaško	Men's sprint	30:11.0	6	72
Marek Matiaško	Men's mass start	50:11.1	3	27
Marek Matiaško	Men's individual	55:48.6	1	5
Miroslav Matiaško	Men's sprint	29:13.0	2	52
Miroslav Matiaško	Men's pursuit	41:32.56	8	49
Miroslav Matiaško	Men's individual	59:43.8	3	38
Dušan Šimočko	Men's individual	1:01:37.8	4	56
Pavol Hurajt; Dušan Šimočko; Miroslav Matiaško; Marek Matiaško	Men's relay	1:27:44.9	22	14

Women

Athlete	Event	Final		
Athlete	Event	Time	Misses	Rank
Jana Gereková	Women's individual	58:37.2	5	59
Martina Halinárová	Women's sprint	23:32.8	0	16
Martina Halinárová	Women's pursuit	Lapped		
Martina Halinárová	Women's individual	55:17.7	4	34
Sona Mihokova	Women's sprint	24:09.9	1	27
Sona Mihokova	Women's pursuit	Lapped		
Sona Mihokova	Women's individual	56:29.5	5	47
Anna Murinova	Women's sprint	24:32.1	1	38
Anna Murinova	Women's pursuit	did not finish		
Marcela Pavkovcekova	Women's sprint	24:11.1	0	29
Marcela Pavkovcekova	Women's pursuit	Lapped		
Marcela Pavkovcekova	Women's individual	53:52.8	3	22
Anna Murinova; Marcela Pavkovcekova; Martina Halinárová; Sona Mihokova	Women's relay	1:21:55.5	10	10

== Bobsleigh ==
Milan Jagnešák piloted the Slovak sled in both the two-man and four-man events, but did not manage a top-20 finish in either.

Athlete	Event	Final					
Athlete	Event	Run 1	Run 2	Run 3	Run 4	Total	Rank
Milan Jagnešák; Viktor Rajek	Two-man	56.81	57.12	57.81	did not advance		25
Milan Jagnešák; Viktor Rajek; Andrej Benda; Robert Krestanko	Four-man	56.29	56.13	56.26	55.98	3:44.66	20

== Cross-country skiing ==
Martin Bajčičák finished 8th in the men's pursuit, the best showing from any Slovak cross-country skier, and carried the nation's flag in the closing ceremonies.

Distance

Athlete	Event	Final	
Athlete	Event	Total	Rank
Martin Bajčičák	Men's 15 km classical	40:35.6	28
Martin Bajčičák	Men's 30 km pursuit	1:17:08.7	8
Martin Bajčičák	Men's 50 km freestyle	2:06:24.9	14
Ivan Bátory	Men's 15 km classical	40:26.1	26
Ivan Bátory	Men's 30 km pursuit	1:18:58.2	25
Ivan Bátory	Men's 50 km freestyle	2:10.32.2	47
Michal Malák	Men's 15 km classical	44:52.9	73
Michal Malák	Men's 30 km pursuit	1:23:39.9	54
Michal Malák	Men's 50 km freestyle	2:09:38.7	45
Alena Procházková	Women's 10 km classical	30:13.6	28
Alena Procházková	Women's 15 km pursuit	47:45.2	46

Sprint

Athlete	Event	Qualifying		Quarterfinal		Semifinal		Final	
Athlete	Event	Total	Rank	Total	Rank	Total	Rank	Total	Rank
Katarina Garajova	Women's sprint	2:23.98	53	Did not advance					53
Martin Otčenáš	Men's sprint	2:24.77	49	Did not advance					49
Alena Procházková	Women's sprint	2:17.75	27	2:17.9	5	Did not advance			23
Martin Bajčičák; Ivan Bátory	Men's team sprint	n/a				17:36.1	3 Q	17:30.9	8

== Ice hockey ==
The Slovak team finished atop its round-robin group, going undefeated through the opening round, including a 3–0 win over eventual gold medal winners Sweden. In the quarterfinals, however, the team fell to rivals Czech Republic 3–1, failing to advance to a medal game.

=== Men's tournament ===
Players

The following is the Slovak roster for the men's ice hockey tournament at the 2006 Winter Olympics.

Head coach: František Hossa

Assistant coaches: Jerguš Bača, Lubomir Pokovic, Róbert Švehla

No.	Pos.	Name	Height	Weight	Birthdate	Team
3	D	Zdeno Chára	6 ft 9 in (206 cm)	249 lb (113 kg)	March 18, 1977 (aged 28)	(Canada) Ottawa Senators
6	D	Radoslav Suchý	6 ft 2 in (188 cm)	205 lb (93 kg)	April 7, 1976 (aged 29)	(United States) Columbus Blue Jackets
7	D	Martin Štrbák	6 ft 3 in (191 cm)	212 lb (96 kg)	January 15, 1975 (aged 31)	(Russia) CSKA Moskva
10	F	Marián Gáborík	6 ft 1 in (185 cm)	201 lb (91 kg)	February 14, 1982 (aged 24)	(United States) Minnesota Wild
12	F	Peter Bondra (A)	6 ft 1 in (185 cm)	201 lb (91 kg)	February 7, 1968 (aged 38)	(United States) Atlanta Thrashers
14	D	Andrej Meszároš	6 ft 2 in (188 cm)	218 lb (99 kg)	October 13, 1985 (aged 20)	(Canada) Ottawa Senators
15	F	Jozef Stümpel	6 ft 3 in (191 cm)	218 lb (99 kg)	July 20, 1972 (aged 33)	(United States) Florida Panthers
17	D	Ľubomír Višňovský	5 ft 10 in (178 cm)	192 lb (87 kg)	August 11, 1976 (aged 29)	(United States) Los Angeles Kings
18	F	Miroslav Šatan (A)	6 ft 2 in (188 cm)	194 lb (88 kg)	October 22, 1974 (aged 31)	(United States) New York Islanders
20	F	Richard Zednik	6 ft 0 in (183 cm)	192 lb (87 kg)	January 6, 1976 (aged 30)	(Canada) Montreal Canadiens
22	F	Richard Kapuš	6 ft 0 in (183 cm)	203 lb (92 kg)	February 9, 1973 (aged 33)	(Russia) Metallurg Novokuznetsk
23	F	Ľuboš Bartečko	6 ft 0 in (183 cm)	201 lb (91 kg)	July 14, 1976 (aged 29)	(Sweden) Luleå HF
25	G	Ján Lašák	6 ft 0 in (183 cm)	205 lb (93 kg)	April 10, 1979 (aged 26)	(Czech Republic) HC Pardubice
28	F	Ronald Petrovický	5 ft 10 in (178 cm)	185 lb (84 kg)	February 15, 1977 (aged 29)	(United States) Atlanta Thrashers
29	D	Ivan Majeský	6 ft 5 in (196 cm)	240 lb (110 kg)	September 2, 1976 (aged 29)	(United States) Washington Capitals
37	G	Peter Budaj	6 ft 1 in (185 cm)	196 lb (89 kg)	September 18, 1982 (aged 23)	(United States) Colorado Avalanche
38	F	Pavol Demitra (C)	6 ft 0 in (183 cm)	205 lb (93 kg)	November 29, 1974 (aged 31)	(United States) Los Angeles Kings
40	F	Marek Svatoš	5 ft 10 in (178 cm)	181 lb (82 kg)	June 17, 1982 (aged 23)	(United States) Colorado Avalanche
43	F	Tomáš Surový	6 ft 1 in (185 cm)	216 lb (98 kg)	September 24, 1981 (aged 24)	(United States) Pittsburgh Penguins
60	G	Karol Križan	5 ft 10 in (178 cm)	194 lb (88 kg)	June 5, 1980 (aged 25)	(Sweden) MODO Hockey
68	D	Milan Jurčina	6 ft 4 in (193 cm)	254 lb (115 kg)	June 7, 1983 (aged 22)	(United States) Boston Bruins
81	F	Marián Hossa	6 ft 2 in (188 cm)	207 lb (94 kg)	January 12, 1979 (aged 27)	(United States) Atlanta Thrashers
91	F	Marcel Hossa	6 ft 2 in (188 cm)	218 lb (99 kg)	October 12, 1981 (aged 24)	(United States) New York Rangers

Round-robin

Pos	Team	Pld	W	D	L	GF	GA	GD	Pts	Qualification
1	Slovakia	5	5	0	0	18	8	+10	10	Quarterfinals
2	Russia	5	4	0	1	23	11	+12	8	Quarterfinals
3	Sweden	5	3	0	2	15	12	+3	6	Quarterfinals
4	United States	5	1	1	3	13	13	0	3	Quarterfinals
5	Kazakhstan	5	1	0	4	9	16	−7	2	
6	Latvia	5	0	1	4	11	29	−18	1	

Source: IIHF

15 February 2006; 20:05	Russia	3–5 (2–1, 1–2, 0–2)	Slovakia	Torino Esposizioni, Turin; Attendance: 3,800

Game reference

Ilya Bryzgalov
Goalies
Peter Budaj
Referee:
(Canada) Paul Devorski
Linesmen:
(Canada) Derek Doucette
(Finland) Antti Hämäläinen

	0–1	9:07 – P. Demitra (Mari. Hossa, R. Suchý)
P. Datsyuk (D. Markov) – 10:00	1–1
A. Kovalev (P. Datsyuk, I. Kovalchuk) – 12:38	2–1
	2–2	25:51 – L. Višňovský (P. Demitra) (PP)
A. Ovechkin (S. Gonchar, F. Tyutin) (PP) – 30:03	3–2
	3–3	33:05 – P. Bondra (A. Meszároš, Z. Chára) (PP)
	3–4	56:32 – M. Gáborík
	3–5	59:31 – M. Gáborík

16 min
Penalties
10 min
23
Shots
36

16 February 2006; 17:05	Slovakia	6–3 (4–1, 1–2, 1–0)	Latvia	Torino Esposizioni, Turin; Attendance: 2,960

Game reference

Ján Lašák
Goalies
Artūrs Irbe
Referee:
(Switzerland) Danny Kurmann
Linesmen:
(Finland) Stefan Fonselius
(Canada) Pierre Racicot

R. Zedník (L. Višňovský) – 5:23	1–0
R. Petrovický (T. Surový, A. Meszároš) – 5:43	2–0
	2–1	6:27 – S. Ozoliņš (M. Cipulis, G. Panteļejevs)
P. Demitra (Mari. Hossa) (SH) – 7:54	3–1
Mari. Hossa – 13:17	4–1
	4–2	20:54 – M. Cipulis (A. Cipruss, G. Panteļejevs)
	4–3	26:51 – A. Ņiživijs (K. Skrastiņš)
Z. Chára (Mari. Hossa) – 33:49	5–3
Mari. Hossa (M. Gáborík) – 49:04	6–3

12 min
Penalties
8 min
25
Shots
28

18 February 2006; 20:05	Slovakia	2–1 (0–0, 1–1, 1–0)	United States	Torino Esposizioni, Turin; Attendance: 4,697

Game reference

Peter Budaj
Goalies
Rick DiPietro
Referee:
(Canada) Dan Marouelli
Linesmen:
(Czech Republic) Petr Blümel
(Canada) Pierre Racicot

Mari. Hossa (P. Demitra, M. Gáborík) (PP) – 34:20	1–0
	1–1	38:24 – B. Rolston (B. Rafalski, S. Gomez) (PP)
P. Bondra (M. Šatan, R. Kapuš) – 41:48	2–1

8 min
Penalties
16 min
21
Shots
30

19 February 2006; 16:05	Slovakia	2–1 (0–1, 1–0, 1–0)	Kazakhstan	Palasport Olimpico, Turin; Attendance: 9,160

Game reference

Karol Križan
Goalies
Vitali Kolesnik
Referee:
(Switzerland) Danny Kurmann
Linesmen:
(Canada) Derek Doucette
(Finland) Antti Hämäläinen

	0–1	16:16 – E. Koreshkov (A. Koreshkov, A. Savenkov) (PP)
P. Bondra (R. Kapuš, M. Jurčina) (PP) – 39:50	1–1
Mari. Hossa (P. Demitra, M. Gáborík) – 48:09	2–1

12 min
Penalties
20 min
27
Shots
19

21 February 2006; 20:05	Sweden	0–3 (0–1, 0–0, 0–2)	Slovakia	Torino Esposizioni, Turin; Attendance: 4,250

Game reference

Mikael Tellqvist
Goalies
Karol Križan
Referee:
(Finland) Timo Favorin
Linesmen:
(Czech Republic) Petr Blümel
(Canada) Pierre Racicot

0–1	15:51 – P. Bondra (M. Šatan)
0–2	46:16 – Mari. Hossa (P. Demitra, M. Gáborík)
0–3	58:58 – R. Suchý (P. Demitra, Mari. Hossa)

14 min
Penalties
10 min
17
Shots
31

Medal round

Quarterfinal

22 February 2006; 21:35	Slovakia	1–3 (0–1, 0–1, 1–1)	Czech Republic	Palasport Olimpico, Turin; Attendance: 6,893

Game reference

Peter Budaj
Goalies
Milan Hnilička
Referee:
(Canada) Don Van Massenhoven
Linesmen:
(Finland) Stefan Fonselius
(Canada) Pierre Racicot

	0–1	12:51 – M. Ručinský (SH)
	0–2	28:41 – M. Hejduk (F. Kaberle, M. Ručinský)
M. Gáborík (Mari. Hossa) – 43:38	1–2
	1–3	59:57 − M. Straka (EN)

8 min
Penalties
14 min
21
Shots
28

== Luge ==
The Slovakian luge delegation was one of the Olympic team's largest, but managed only a single top 15 finish, from the doubles team of Ľubomír Mick and Walter Marx.

Athlete	Event	Final					
Athlete	Event	Run 1	Run 2	Run 3	Run 4	Total	Rank
Jozef Ninis	Men's singles	52.769	52.517	52.525	52.386	3:30.197	22
Veronika Sabolová	Women's singles	49.680	48.226	48.095	48.060	3:14.061	19
Jana Šišajová	Women's singles	48.860	50.267	48.479	49.387	3:16.993	22
Jaroslav Slavík	Men's singles	52.786	52.066	1:13.877	52.156	3:50.885	33
Ľubomír Mick; Walter Marx	Doubles	48.412	47.857	n/a		1:36.269	13

== Short track speed skating ==
The lone Slovak short track speed skater competing in Turin, Matus Uzak, was disqualified from two of his events, and failed to advance from his heat in the third.

Athlete	Event	Heat		Quarterfinal		Semifinal		Final	
Athlete	Event	Time	Rank	Time	Rank	Time	Rank	Time	Rank
Matus Uzak	Men's 500 m	44.525	4	did not advance					21
Matus Uzak	Men's 1000 m	1:35.989	2 Q	disqualified					
Matus Uzak	Men's 1500 m	disqualified							

== Ski jumping ==
Martin Mesík represented Slovakia in ski jumping, but did not advance from the qualification round in either the large hill or normal hill events.

Athlete	Event	Qualifying		First round		Final		
Athlete	Event	Points	Rank	Points	Rank	Points	Total	Rank
Martin Mesík	Normal hill	97.5	42	did not advance				42
Martin Mesík	Large hill	67.7	37	did not advance				37

== Snowboarding ==
Radoslav Židek failed to qualify for the medal round in the men's parallel giant slalom, but was more successful in the snowboard cross. Židek qualified in the top ten, then won in three consecutive rounds to make the final. He finished just behind American Seth Wescott, who made a dramatic pass and pipped him to the line. Still, Židek's second-place finished earned him a silver medal, the first winter medal in Slovakian Olympic history.

Parallel GS

Athlete	Event	Qualification		Round of 16	Quarterfinals	Semifinals	Finals	
Athlete	Event	Time	Rank	Opposition Time	Opposition Time	Opposition Time	Opposition Time	Rank
Radoslav Židek	Men's parallel giant slalom	1:16.51	27	did not advance				27

Snowboard cross

Athlete	Event	Qualifying		1/8 finals	Quarterfinals	Semifinals	Finals	
Athlete	Event	Time	Rank	Position	Position	Position	Position	Rank
Radoslav Židek	Men's snowboard cross	1:21.19	9 Q	1 Q	1 Q	1 Q	2	Silver medal
