= List of flag bearers for Slovakia at the Olympics =

Slovakia at the Olympics
- IOC code: SVK
- NOC: Slovak Olympic Committee
- Website: www.olympic.sk (in Slovak)
- Medals: Gold 14 Silver 18 Bronze 11 Total 43

Summer appearances
- 1996; 2000; 2004; 2008; 2012; 2016; 2020; 2024

Winter appearances
- 1994; 1998; 2002; 2006; 2010; 2014; 2018; 2022; 2026

Other related appearances
- Hungary (1896–1912); Czechoslovakia (1924–1992)

This is a list of flag bearers who have represented Slovakia at the Olympics.

Flag bearers carry the national flag of their country at the opening ceremony of the Olympic Games.

#	Event year	Season	Flag bearer	Sport
1	1994	Winter	Peter Šťastný	Ice hockey
2	1996	Summer	Jozef Lohyňa	Wrestling
3	1998	Winter	Ivan Bátory	Cross-country skiing
4	2000	Summer	Slavomír Kňazovický	Canoe sprint
5	2002	Winter	Róbert Petrovický	Ice hockey
6	2004	Summer	Michal Martikán	Canoe slalom
7	2006	Winter	Walter Marx (Note: Marx unofficially carried the flag of Czechoslovakia on his arm.)	Luge
8	2008	Summer	Elena Kaliská	Canoe slalom
9	2010	Winter	Žigmund Pálffy	Ice hockey
10	2012	Summer	Jozef Gönci	Shooting
11	2014	Winter	Zdeno Chára	Ice hockey
12	2016	Summer	Danka Barteková	Shooting
13	2018	Winter	Veronika Velez-Zuzulová	Alpine skiing
14	2020	Summer	Zuzana Rehák-Štefečeková	Shooting
14	2020	Summer	Matej Beňuš	Canoe slalom
15	2022	Winter	Katarína Šimoňáková	Luge
15	2022	Winter	Marek Hrivík	Ice hockey
16	2024	Summer	Zuzana Paňková	Canoe slalom
16	2024	Summer	Jakub Grigar	Canoe slalom
17	2026	Winter	Viktória Čerňanská	Bobsleigh
17	2026	Winter	Tomáš Tatar	Ice hockey

== See also ==
- Slovakia at the Olympics
