= Slovakia at the 1998 Winter Olympics =

- IOC code: SVK
- NOC: Slovak Olympic and Sports Committee
- Website: www.olympic.sk (in Slovak)

in Nagano
- Competitors: 37 (29 men, 8 women) in 7 sports
- Flag bearer: Ivan Bátory (cross-country skiing)
- Medals: Gold 0 Silver 0 Bronze 0 Total 0

Winter Olympics appearances (overview)
- 1994; 1998; 2002; 2006; 2010; 2014; 2018; 2022; 2026

Other related appearances
- Czechoslovakia (1924–1992)

Slovakia participated at the 1998 Winter Olympics in Nagano, Japan, held between 7 and 22 February 1998. The country's participation in the Games marked its second appearance at the Winter Olympics since its debut in the 1994 Games.

The Slovak team consisted of 37 athletes who competed across seven sports. Ivan Bátory served as the country's flag-bearer during the opening ceremony. Slovakia did not win any medals in the Games, and has not won a Winter Olympics medal as of these Games.

== Background ==
A Slovak National Olympic Committee was formed on 18 June 1939 and gained recognition shortly thereafter. However, in June 1947, it was integrated into the Czechoslovak Olympic Committee. The nation split from Czechoslovakia on 1 January 1993, and the Slovak Olympic and Sports Committee was officially formed on 19 December 1992, just before the split. It received recognition by the International Olympic Committee (IOC) on 24 September 1993. The 1994 Winter Olympics marked Slovakia's first participation in the Winter Olympics. After the nation made its debut in the Winter Olympics at the 1994 Games, this edition of the Games in 1998 marked the nation's second appearance at the Winter Games.

The 1998 Winter Olympics was held in Nagano, Japan, held between 7 and 22 February 1998. The Slovak team consisted of 37 athletes who competed across seven sports. Ivan Bátory served as the country's flag-bearer during the opening ceremony. Slovakia did not win any medals in the Games, and has not won a Winter Olympics medal as of these Games.

== Competitors ==
The Slovak delegation consisted of 37 members including eight women who competed in seven sports.

Sport	Men	Women	Total
Biathlon	1	4	5
Cross-country skiing	5	2	7
Figure skating	1	0	1
Ice hockey	21	0	21
Luge	0	1	1
Ski jumping	1	–	1
Snowboarding	0	1	1
Total	29	8	37

== Biathlon ==
Biathlon competitions were held at Nozawa Onsen Resort, Nozawa Onsen. Five Slovak athletes participated across the five events in biathlon. The biathlon events consisted of a skiing a specific course multiple times depending on the length of the competition, with intermediate shooting at various positions. For every shot missed, a penalty of one minute is applied in individual events, and the participant is required to ski through a penalty loop in sprint events. Ľubomír Machyniak was the lone male participant for Slovakia. Amongst the women, the three participants in the sprint recorded top ten finishes, and the relay team narrowly missed out on a medal.

Athlete	Event	Time	Misses ^{1}	Adjusted Time ^{2}	Rank
Ľubomír Machyniak	Men's 10 km sprint	30:30.3	1	—N/a	41
Ľubomír Machyniak	Men's 20 km individual	57:43.7	4	1'01:43.7	38
Anna Murínová	Women's 7.5 km sprint	—N/a	23:56.7	0	9
Martina Halinárová	Women's 7.5 km sprint	—N/a	23:54.5	1	7
Soňa Mihoková	Women's 7.5 km sprint	—N/a	23:42.3	1	4
Anna Murínová	Women's 15 km individual	1'00:06.7	2	1'02:06.7	48
Martina Halinárová	Women's 15 km individual	56:56.5	5	1'01:56.5	46
Soňa Mihoková	Women's 15 km individual	56:20.8	3	59:20.8	26
Martina Halinárová; Anna Murínová; Tatiana Kutlíková; Soňa Mihoková	Women's relay	1'41:20.6	2	—N/a	4

^{1} A penalty loop of 150 metres had to be skied per missed target.
^{2} One minute added per missed target.

== Cross-country skiing ==
Cross-country skiing competitions were held at Snow Harp, Hakuba. Seven athletes including two women participated across nine events. None of the men registered a top ten finish, while only Jaroslava Bukvajová finished in tenth in the women's classical event.

Men

Athlete	Event	Time	Rank
Ivan Bátory	Men's 10 km classical	31:07.6	60
Ivan Hudač	Men's 10 km classical	33:41.9	85
Martin Bajčičák	Men's 10 km classical	31:29.0	67
Stanislav Ježík	Men's 10 km classical	31:11.2	64
Ivan Bátory	Men's 15 km pursuit	44:18.2	33
Ivan Hudač	Men's 15 km pursuit	50:14.7	64
Martin Bajčičák	Men's 15 km pursuit	44:54.6	38
Stanislav Ježík	Men's 15 km pursuit	48:30.3	57
Ivan Bátory	Men's 30 km classical	1'40:47.8	26
Ivan Hudač	Men's 30 km classical	1'50:11.6	59
Martin Bajčičák	Men's 30 km classical	1'40:52.5	28
Stanislav Ježík	Men's 30 km classical	1'44:01.0	46
Ivan Bátory	Men's 50 km freestyle	2'13:54.5	19
Ivan Hudač	Men's 50 km freestyle	DNF	–
Martin Bajčičák	Men's 50 km freestyle	DNF	–
Andrej Pátricka; Ivan Bátory; Martin Bajčičák; Stanislav Ježík	Men's relay	1'44:31.6	11

Women

Event	Athlete	Race	
Event	Athlete	Time	Rank
Alžbeta Havrančíková	Women's 5 km classical	19:48.5	58
Jaroslava Bukvajová	Women's 5 km classical	18:39.7	16
Alžbeta Havrančíková	Women's 10 km pursuit	32:21.3	40
Jaroslava Bukvajová	Women's 10 km pursuit	30:34.5	18
Jaroslava Bukvajová	Women's 15 km classical	49:02.0	10
Alžbeta Havrančíková	Women's 30 km freestyle	1'30:38.6	25
Jaroslava Bukvajová	Women's 30 km freestyle	1'28:21.0	15

== Figure skating ==
Figure skating competitions were held at Aqua Wing Arena, Nagano / Big Hat, Nagano. The participants were ranked in ordinal order by individual judges, and the final placements were determined by a majority placement rule. Róbert Kažimír was the lone participant for Slovakia and he did not finish the event.

Athlete	Event	Short Program	Free Skating	Total	Rank
Róbert Kažimír	Men's individual	26	DNF	DNF	–

== Ice hockey ==
Ice hockey competitions were held at Aqua Wing Arena, Nagano / Big Hat, Nagano. Eight of the 14 teams competed in a two group round robin tournament, with the winners advancing to the preliminary stage. The Slovak team finished second in the group stage, and failed to advance to the next round. It lost the classification match for ninth place, and finished in tenth place in the competition.

Preliminary round

Top team (shaded) advanced to the first round.

Team	GP	W	L	T	GF	GA	GD	Pts
Kazakhstan	3	2	0	1	14	11	+3	5
Slovakia	3	1	1	1	9	9	0	3
Italy	3	1	2	0	11	11	0	2
Austria	3	0	1	2	9	12	-3	2

All times are local (UTC-7).

7 February 1998	Austria	2 – 2 (1-0, 1-2, 0-0)	Slovakia	The Big Hat/ Aqua Wing Arena, Nagano, Japan; Attendance: 4,315

8 February 1998	Slovakia	4 – 3 (1-2, 3-1, 0-0)	Italy	The Big Hat/ Aqua Wing Arena, Nagano, Japan; Attendance: 8,620

10 February 1998	Slovakia	3 – 4 (1-1, 1-0, 1-3)	Kazakhstan	The Big Hat/ Aqua Wing Arena, Nagano, Japan; Attendance: 3,659

=== Consolation round - 9th place match ===
All times are local (UTC-7).

12 February 1998	Germany	4 – 2 (0-1, 1-1, 3-0)	Slovakia 10th	The Big Hat/ Aqua Wing Arena, Nagano, Japan; Attendance: 8,670

- Team roster
  - Peter Bondra
  - Zdeno Cíger
  - Jozef Daňo
  - Ivan Droppa
  - Oto Haščák
  - Branislav Jánoš
  - Stanislav Jasečko
  - Ľubomír Kolník
  - Roman Kontšek
  - Miroslav Mosnár
  - Igor Murín
  - Ján Pardavý
  - Róbert Petrovický
  - Vlastimil Plavucha
  - Peter Pucher
  - Karol Rusznyák
  - Ľubomír Sekeráš
  - Roman Stantien
  - Róbert Švehla
  - Ján Varholík
  - Ľubomír Višňovský
- Head coach: Ján Štěrbák

== Luge ==
Luge competitions were held at The Spiral, Asakawa, Nagano. A lone woman athlete Mária Jasenčáková participated across the two events in luge. Jasenčáková was ranked 12th after her first run across the 1,194 m (3,917 ft) course. However, she steadily dropped down the order after poor second and third runs. She finished 15th in the overall classification.

Women

Athlete	Run 1		Run 2		Run 3		Run 4		Total		
Athlete	Time	Rank	Time	Rank	Time	Rank	Time	Rank	Time	Rank	
Mária Jasenčáková	Women's singles	52.006	12	52.336	20	51.721	17	51.302	14	3:27.365	15

== Ski jumping ==
Ski jumping competitions were held at Hakuba Ski Jumping Stadium, Hakuba. A lone athlete Martin Mesík participated across the two events in Ski jumping.

Athlete	Event	Jump 1			Jump 2		Total	
Athlete	Event	Distance	Points	Rank	Distance	Points	Points	Rank
Martin Mesík	Normal hill	65.0	61.0	60	Did not advance			
Martin Mesík	Large hill	112.0	101.6	26 Q	110.5	96.4	198.0	26

== Snowboarding ==
Snowboarding competitions were held at Mt. Yakebitai, Shiga Kogen. A lone athlete Jana Šedová represented the nation in snowboarding. She did not complete the course in the women's giant slalom event.

Athlete	Race 1	Race 2	Total	Rank	
Jana Šedová	Women's giant slalom	DNF	–	DNF	–
