= Biathlon at the 2006 Winter Olympics – Women's pursuit =

Women's biathlon pursuit at the XX Olympic Winter Games
- Venue: Cesana San Sicario
- Dates: 18 February
- Competitors: 58 from 22 nations
- Winning time: 36:43.6

Medalists
1st place, gold medalist(s)		Kati Wilhelm	Germany
2nd place, silver medalist(s)		Martina Glagow	Germany
3rd place, bronze medalist(s)		Albina Akhatova	Russia

The Women's 10 kilometre biathlon pursuit competition at the 2006 Winter Olympics in Turin, Italy was held on 18 February, at Cesana San Sicario. Competitors in this biathlon raced over five loops of a 2.0 kilometre skiing course, shooting twenty times, ten prone and ten standing. Each miss required a competitor to ski a 150-metre penalty loop.

The starting order for the pursuit was based on the results of the sprint; the top 60 finishers in that race qualified for the pursuit. In addition, each racer's final deficit behind sprint winner Florence Baverel-Robert corresponded to their starting deficit in the pursuit; Anna Carin Olofsson, who finished 2 seconds behind Fischer in the sprint, started 2 seconds after her in the pursuit.

The winner was the first racer over the finish line, Kati Wilhelm. Skiers who were lapped were not ranked in the official results.

At the 2005 World Championships, Germany's Uschi Disl successfully defended her four-second lead after the sprint event to win the pursuit, while Russian Olga Pyleva won the event at the 2002 Olympics. Kati Wilhelm led the pursuit World Cup standings before the Olympics, ahead of Sandrine Bailly of France and Disl.

== Results ==
The race was held at 12:30.

Rank	Bib	Name	Country	Start	Time	Penalties (P+P+S+S)	Deficit
1st place, gold medalist(s)	7	Kati Wilhelm	Germany	0:18	36:43.6	1 (0+0+1+0)	—
2nd place, silver medalist(s)	17	Martina Glagow	Germany	1:05	37:57.2	2 (1+1+0+0)	+1:13.6
3rd place, bronze medalist(s)	4	Albina Akhatova	Russia	0:09	38:05.0	1 (0+1+0+0)	+1:21.4
4	10	Svetlana Ishmouratova	Russia	0:39	38:29.0	2 (0+1+1+0)	+1:45.4
5	13	Michela Ponza	Italy	0:56	38:51.7	1 (0+0+0+1)	+2:08.1
6	12	Liv Grete Poirée	Norway	0:49	39:03.4	2 (1+0+0+1)	+2:19.8
7	8	Olga Nazarova	Belarus	0:22	39:09.7	3 (0+0+2+1)	+2:26.1
8	3	Lilia Efremova	Ukraine	0:07	39:09.8	3 (0+1+2+0)	+2:26.2
9	11	Liu Xianying	China	0:46	39:25.3	3 (0+2+1+0)	+2:41.7
10	34	Uschi Disl	Germany	1:58	39:30.8	4 (2+1+0+1)	+2:47.2
11	22	Katrin Apel	Germany	1:34	39:38.9	3 (0+1+0+2)	+2:55.3
12	6	Sandrine Bailly	France	0:12	39:39.4	3 (0+1+0+2)	+2:55.8
13	1	Florence Baverel-Robert	France	0:00	39:57.6	4 (1+1+1+1)	+3:14.0
14	2	Anna Carin Olofsson	Sweden	0:02	40:06.1	7 (1+2+1+3)	+3:22.5
15	19	Linda Tjorhom	Norway	1:17	40:19.8	3 (0+0+1+2)	+3:36.2
16	15	Teja Gregorin	Slovenia	1:00	40:20.1	2 (0+0+1+1)	+3:36.5
17	24	Kong Yingchao	China	1:36	40:41.9	3 (0+0+2+1)	+3:58.3
18	23	Tora Berger	Norway	1:34	40:44.8	2 (0+0+1+1)	+4:01.2
19	9	Olga Zaitseva	Russia	0:34	40:49.0	5 (1+2+2+0)	+4:05.4
20	28	Madara Liduma	Latvia	1:40	40:50.8	6 (1+0+3+2)	+4:07.2
21	20	Magdalena Gwizdon	Poland	1:23	41:12.6	3 (1+0+1+1)	+4:29.0
22	21	Sun Ribo	China	1:26	41:28.8	7 (0+0+3+4)	+4:45.2
23	41	Natalia Levtchenkova	Moldova	2:03	41:36.1	1 (0+0+0+1)	+4:52.5
24	39	Kateřina Holubcová	Czech Republic	2:02	41:37.5	2 (0+0+1+1)	+4:53.9
25	5	Olena Zubrilova	Belarus	0:09	41:42.9	8 (1+3+1+3)	+4:59.3
26	14	Delphyne Peretto	France	1:00	41:52.8	3 (0+2+0+1)	+5:09.2
27	18	Diana Rasimovičiūtė	Lithuania	1:17	41:56.3	4 (1+1+1+1)	+5:12.7
28	33	Ekaterina Dafovska	Bulgaria	1:52	42:07.6	6 (0+1+3+2)	+5:24.0
29	37	Ekaterina Ivanova	Belarus	2:00	42:15.5	7 (0+2+4+1)	+5:31.9
30	36	Irina Nikoultchina	Bulgaria	1:59	42:26.8	7 (1+0+3+3)	+5:43.2
31	31	Tadeja Brankovič	Slovenia	1:43	42:42.1	5 (1+1+1+2)	+5:58.5
32	46	Pavlina Filipova	Bulgaria	2:22	43:04.5	6 (0+1+2+3)	+6:20.9
33	48	Dana Elena Plotogea	Romania	2:30	43:11.0	3 (1+0+0+2)	+6:27.4
34	30	Sylvie Becaert	France	1:42	43:17.1	3 (1+1+1+0)	+6:33.5
35	43	Zdeňka Vejnarová	Czech Republic	2:15	43:17.7	4 (0+3+0+1)	+6:34.1
36	32	Lenka Faltusová	Czech Republic	1:46	43:22.5	4 (1+1+1+1)	+6:38.9
37	25	Krystyna Pałka	Poland	1:36	43:26.5	5 (2+1+1+1)	+6:42.9
38	26	Nathalie Santer	Italy	1:38	43:31.6	8 (3+1+3+1)	+6:48.0
39	35	Rachel Steer	United States	1:58	43:32.8	2 (0+0+1+1)	+6:49.2
40	40	Gro Marit Istad Kristiansen	Norway	2:02	43:41.5	6 (2+2+1+1)	+6:57.9
41	50	Nina Lemesh	Ukraine	2:42	43:48.6	5 (1+2+1+1)	+7:05.0
	16	Martina Halinarova	Slovakia	1:01	LAP	8 (2+3+2+1)	
	27	Sona Mihokova	Slovakia	1:39	LAP	8 (3+3+1+1)	
	29	Marcela Pavkovcekova	Slovakia	1:40	LAP	5 (2+1+1+1)	
	45	Alexandra Rusu	Romania	2:21	LAP	4 (2+0+0+2)	
	47	Eveli Saue	Estonia	2:24	LAP	7 (1+1+3+2)	
	49	Oksana Khvostenko	Ukraine	2:39	LAP	4 (1+1+2+0)	
	51	Ikuyo Tsukidate	Japan	2:46	LAP	7 (2+1+1+3)	
	52	Anna Lebedeva	Kazakhstan	2:50	LAP	6 (2+2+2+0)	
	55	Dijana Grudiček	Slovenia	2:57	LAP	8 (2+0+4+2)	
	56	Magdalena Nykiel	Poland	3:01	LAP	5 (0+3+1+1)	
	57	Saskia Santer	Italy	3:11	LAP	7 (0+1+4+2)	
	58	Radka Popova	Bulgaria	3:30	LAP	3 (0+1+0+2)	
	59	Andreja Mali	Slovenia	3:31	LAP	3 (1+1+1+0)	
	60	Anzela Brice	Latvia	3:32	LAP	2 (0+0+1+1)	
	38	Anna Murinova	Slovakia	2:01	DNF	4 (2+2+ + )	
	42	Ludmilla Ananko	Belarus	2:05	DNF	8 (2+3+3+ )	
	53	Katja Haller	Italy	2:51	DNF	6 (3+1+2+ )	
	44	Olena Petrova	Ukraine	2:21	DNS		
	54	Hou Yuxia	China	2:54	DNS		
