= Cross-country skiing at the 2018 Winter Olympics – Men's 50 kilometre classical =

Men's 50 kilometre classical at the XXIII Olympic Winter Games
- Cross-country skiing
- Venue: Alpensia Cross-Country Skiing Centre
- Dates: 24 February 2018
- Competitors: 69 from 31 nations
- Winning time: 2:08:22.1

Medalists
1st place, gold medalist(s)		Iivo Niskanen	Finland
2nd place, silver medalist(s)		Alexander Bolshunov	Olympic Athletes from Russia
3rd place, bronze medalist(s)		Andrey Larkov	Olympic Athletes from Russia

The men's 50 kilometre classical cross-country skiing competition at the 2018 Winter Olympics was held on 24 February 2018 at 14:00 KST at the Alpensia Cross-Country Skiing Centre in Pyeongchang, South Korea.

== Qualification ==
A total of up to 310 cross-country skiers qualified across all eleven events. Athletes qualified for this event by having met the A qualification standard, which meant having 100 or less FIS Points in the distance classification. The Points list takes into average the best results of athletes per discipline during the qualification period (1 July 2016 to 21 January 2018). Countries received additional quotas by having athletes ranked in the top 30 of the FIS Olympics Points list (two per gender maximum, overall across all events). Countries also received an additional quota (one per gender maximum) if an athlete was ranked in the top 300 of the FIS Olympics Points list. After the distribution of B standard quotas, the remaining quotas were distributed using the Olympic FIS Points list, with each athlete only counting once for qualification purposes. A country could only enter a maximum of four athletes for the event.

== Competition schedule ==
All times are (UTC+9).

Date	Time	Event
24 February	14:00	Final

== Results ==
The race started at 14:00.

Rank	Bib	Name	Country	Time	Deficit
1st place, gold medalist(s)	8	Iivo Niskanen	Finland	2:08:22.1	—
2nd place, silver medalist(s)	7	Alexander Bolshunov	Olympic Athletes from Russia	2:08:40.8	+18.7
3rd place, bronze medalist(s)	11	Andrey Larkov	Olympic Athletes from Russia	2:10:59.6	+2:37.5
4	2	Alex Harvey	Canada	2:11:05.7	+2:43.6
5	4	Martin Johnsrud Sundby	Norway	2:11:05.8	+2:43.7
6	3	Hans Christer Holund	Norway	2:11:12.2	+2:50.1
7	15	Daniel Rickardsson	Sweden	2:12:12.5	+3:50.4
8	22	Martin Jakš	Czech Republic	2:12:32.6	+4:10.5
9	1	Dario Cologna	Switzerland	2:12:43.2	+4:21.1
10	12	Emil Iversen	Norway	2:12:59.0	+4:36.9
11	29	Scott Patterson	United States	2:13:14.2	+4:52.1
12	6	Aleksey Chervotkin	Olympic Athletes from Russia	2:13:19.0	+4:56.9
13	21	Niklas Dyrhaug	Norway	2:13:20.5	+4:58.4
14	28	Andreas Katz	Germany	2:13:32.3	+5:10.2
15	5	Alexey Poltoranin	Kazakhstan	2:13:37.1	+5:15.0
16	27	Giandomenico Salvadori	Italy	2:13:45.4	+5:23.3
17	56	Algo Kärp	Estonia	2:13:45.7	+5:23.6
18	9	Jean-Marc Gaillard	France	2:14:31.4	+6:09.3
19	37	Maicol Rastelli	Italy	2:15:10.0	+6:47.9
20	16	Denis Spitsov	Olympic Athletes from Russia	2:16:24.6	+8:02.5
21	26	Dietmar Nöckler	Italy	2:16:29.2	+8:07.1
22	14	Francesco De Fabiani	Italy	2:17:14.3	+8:52.2
23	23	Keishin Yoshida	Japan	2:17:21.9	+8:59.8
24	18	Clément Parisse	France	2:17:25.4	+9:03.3
25	13	Matti Heikkinen	Finland	2:17:34.8	+9:12.7
26	32	Devon Kershaw	Canada	2:17:49.4	+9:27.3
27	48	Graeme Killick	Canada	2:18:28.8	+10:06.7
28	25	Jens Burman	Sweden	2:18:34.5	+10:12.4
29	35	Perttu Hyvärinen	Finland	2:18:38.5	+10:16.4
30	19	Thomas Bing	Germany	2:18:41.1	+10:19.0
31	30	Candide Pralong	Switzerland	2:18:41.5	+10:19.4
32	38	Paul Constantin Pepene	Romania	2:18:44.0	+10:21.9
33	42	Noah Hoffman	United States	2:19:04.1	+10:42.0
34	34	Irineu Esteve Altimiras	Andorra	2:19:08.3	+10:46.2
35	51	Imanol Rojo	Spain	2:19:10.1	+10:48.0
36	33	Max Hauke	Austria	2:20:39.9	+12:17.8
37	10	Andrew Musgrave	Great Britain	2:20:57.9	+12:35.8
38	46	Andreas Veerpalu	Estonia	2:21:13.2	+12:51.1
39	40	Yevgeniy Velichko	Kazakhstan	2:21:43.2	+13:21.1
40	36	Viktor Thorn	Sweden	2:21:53.8	+13:31.7
41	47	Aleš Razým	Czech Republic	2:22:06.8	+13:44.7
42	54	Bernhard Tritscher	Austria	2:22:47.7	+14:25.6
43	24	Ristomatti Hakola	Finland	2:22:50.1	+14:28.0
44	41	Michail Semenov	Belarus	2:22:51.2	+14:29.1
45	39	Ueli Schnider	Switzerland	2:23:17.3	+14:55.2
46	20	Lucas Bögl	Germany	2:23:42.8	+15:20.7
47	58	Kim Magnus	South Korea	2:24:14.0	+15:51.9
48	57	Tyler Kornfield	United States	2:24:36.5	+16:14.4
49	49	Russell Kennedy	Canada	2:25:16.6	+16:54.5
50	55	Oleksiy Krasovsky	Ukraine	2:25:36.4	+17:14.3
51	60	Peter Mlynár	Slovakia	2:26:14.7	+17:52.6
52	45	Vitaliy Pukhkalo	Kazakhstan	2:27:10.6	+18:48.5
53	64	Andrej Segeč	Slovakia	2:27:44.3	+19:22.2
54	66	Callum Smith	Great Britain	2:27:56.3	+19:34.2
55	53	Petr Knop	Czech Republic	2:29:20.9	+20:58.8
56	62	Phillip Bellingham	Australia	2:30:39.7	+22:17.6
57	59	Indulis Bikše	Latvia	2:31:07.5	+22:45.4
58	63	Callum Watson	Australia	2:33:28.6	+25:06.5
59	67	Wang Qiang	China	2:34:43.0	+26:20.9
60	71	Martin Møller	Denmark	2:36:10.8	+27:48.7
	68	Mantas Strolia	Lithuania	LAP	
	70	Mark Chanloung	Thailand	LAP	
	69	Kim Eun-ho	South Korea	LAP	
	31	Jonas Dobler	Germany	DNF	
	43	Veselin Tzinzov	Bulgaria	DNF	
	50	Miroslav Rypl	Czech Republic	DNF	
	65	Miroslav Šulek	Slovakia	DNF	
	17	Calle Halfvarsson	Sweden	DNF	
	44	Snorri Einarsson	Iceland	DNF	
	52	Denis Volotka	Kazakhstan	DNS	
	61	Thomas Hjalmar Westgård	Ireland	DNS	
