= Slovakia at the 2018 Winter Olympics =

- Flag of Slovakia
- IOC code: SVK
- NOC: Slovak Olympic and Sports Committee
- Website: www.olympic.sk (in Slovak)

in Pyeongchang, South Korea 9–25 February 2018
- Competitors: 56 (41 men and 15 women) in 7 sports
- Flag bearers: Veronika Velez-Zuzulová (opening); Petra Vlhová (closing)
- Medals Ranked 17th: Gold 1 Silver 2 Bronze 0 Total 3

Winter Olympics appearances (overview)
- 1994; 1998; 2002; 2006; 2010; 2014; 2018; 2022; 2026

Other related appearances
- Czechoslovakia (1924–1992)

Slovakia competed at the 2018 Winter Olympics in Pyeongchang, South Korea, from 9 to 25 February 2018, with 56 competitors in 7 sports. Biathlete Anastasiya Kuzmina was the country's sole medalist, taking one gold and two silver medals, earning Slovakia 17th place in the overall medal table.

== Medalists ==
Medal	Name	Sport	Event	Date
Gold	Anastasiya Kuzmina	Biathlon	Women's mass start	17 February
Silver	Anastasiya Kuzmina	Biathlon	Women's pursuit	12 February
Silver	Anastasiya Kuzmina	Biathlon	Women's individual	15 February

== Competitors ==
The following is the list of number of competitors participating at the Games per sport/discipline.

Sport	Men	Women	Total
Alpine skiing	3	4	7
Biathlon	5	5	10
Cross-country skiing	3	2	5
Figure skating	1	2	3
Ice hockey	25	0	25
Luge	4	1	5
Snowboarding	0	1	1
Total	41	15	56

== Alpine skiing ==
Men

Athlete	Event	Run 1		Run 2		Total	
Athlete	Event	Time	Rank	Time	Rank	Time	Rank
Matej Falat	Combined	1:23.21	53	DNF			
Matej Falat	Giant slalom	1:14.99	49	1:19.79	61	2:34.78	50
Matej Falat	Slalom	51.86	32	DNF			
Adam Žampa	Combined	1:23.02	51	48.08	9	2:11.10	22
Adam Žampa	Giant slalom	1:11.40	26	1:10.46	13	2:21.86	25
Adam Žampa	Slalom	49.91	24	52.36	26	1:42.27	24
Andreas Žampa	Super-G	—N/a				1:28.89	39
Andreas Žampa	Giant slalom	1:10.61	18	DNF			
Andreas Žampa	Slalom	54.15	39	59.43	36	1:53.58	35

Women

Athlete	Event	Run 1		Run 2		Total	
Athlete	Event	Time	Rank	Time	Rank	Time	Rank
Barbara Kantorová	Downhill	—N/a				1:45.99	29
Barbara Kantorová	Super-G	—N/a				1:25.30	35
Barbara Kantorová	Combined	1:45.58	21	44.36	18	2:29.94	18
Barbara Kantorová	Giant slalom	1:17.74	42	1:15.20	41	2:32.94	41
Barbara Kantorová	Slalom	54.62	40	53.81	34	1:48.43	34
Soňa Moravčíková	Giant slalom	1:17.88	43	1:14.11	34	2:31.99	37
Soňa Moravčíková	Slalom	DNF					
Veronika Velez-Zuzulová	Slalom	51.46	21	50.61	16	1:42.07	17
Petra Vlhová	Downhill	—N/a				DNF	
Petra Vlhová	Super-G	—N/a				1:24.26	32
Petra Vlhová	Combined	1:42.58	13	40.41	2	2:22.99	5
Petra Vlhová	Giant slalom	1:11.71	12	1:10.42	21	2:22.13	13
Petra Vlhová	Slalom	51.12	12	50.46	14	1:41.58	13

Mixed

Athlete	Event	Round of 16	Quarterfinal	Semifinal	Final / BM	
Athlete	Event	Opposition Result	Opposition Result	Opposition Result	Opposition Result	Rank
Matej Falat; Adam Žampa; Andreas Žampa; Soňa Moravčíková; Veronika Velez-Zuzulová; Petra Vlhová	Team	Germany; L 2–2*	Did not advance			

== Biathlon ==
Based on their Nations Cup rankings in the 2016–17 Biathlon World Cup, Slovakia has qualified a team of 5 men and 5 women.

Men

Athlete	Event	Time	Misses	Rank
Šimon Bartko	Sprint	26:18.4	5 (2+3)	74
Tomáš Hasilla	Sprint	26:10.4	3 (1+2)	70
Tomáš Hasilla	Individual	58:55.2	9 (3+1+3+2)	86
Matej Kazár	Sprint	22:33.7	1 (0+1)	22
Matej Kazár	Pursuit	36:42.4	5 (1+2+1+1)	31
Matej Kazár	Individual	51:52.4	2 (0+1+1+0)	34
Martin Otčenáš	Sprint	25:39.7	4 (0+4)	52
Martin Otčenáš	Pursuit	36:22.5	3 (0+0+3+0)	27
Martin Otčenáš	Individual	57:16.0	5 (1+2+0+2)	84
Michal Šíma	Individual	57:52.3	6 (1+1+2+2)	85
Šimon Bartko; Tomáš Hasilla; Matej Kazár; Martin Otčenáš	Team relay	LAP	16 (10+6)	18

Women

Athlete	Event	Time	Misses	Rank
Ivona Fialková	Sprint	24:48.6	5 (2+3)	74
Ivona Fialková	Individual	48:04.4	6 (1+1+1+3)	64
Paulína Fialková	Sprint	21:56.8	1 (1+0)	11
Paulína Fialková	Pursuit	34:33.6	8 (2+2+2+2)	38
Paulína Fialková	Individual	42:09.5	1 (1+0+0+0)	5
Paulína Fialková	Mass start	37:52.6	4 (1+2+0+1)	21
Anastasiya Kuzmina	Sprint	22:00.1	3 (2+1)	13
Anastasiya Kuzmina	Pursuit	31:04.7	4 (0+1+2+1)	2nd place, silver medalist(s)
Anastasiya Kuzmina	Individual	41:31.9	2 (0+1+1+0)	2nd place, silver medalist(s)
Anastasiya Kuzmina	Mass start	35:23.0	1 (0+0+0+1)	1st place, gold medalist(s)
Terézia Poliaková	Sprint	25:32.2	5 (1+4)	83
Terézia Poliaková	Individual	54:46.3	10 (1+4+3+2)	87
Paulína Fialková; Anastasiya Kuzmina; Terézia Poliaková; Ivona Fialková	Team relay	1:12:41.8	10 (3+7)	5

Mixed

Athlete	Event	Time	Misses	Rank
Paulína Fialková; Matej Kazár; Anastasiya Kuzmina; Martin Otčenáš	Team relay	LAP	14 (10+4)	20

== Cross-country skiing ==
Slovakia has qualified 3 men and 2 women.

Distance

Athlete	Event	Total		
Athlete	Event	Time	Deficit	Rank
Peter Mlynár	Men's 15 km freestyle	37:46.2	+4:02.3	67
Peter Mlynár	Men's 50 km classical	2:26:14.7	+17:52.6	51
Andrej Segeč	Men's 15 km freestyle	39:13.4	+5:29.5	87
Andrej Segeč	Men's 50 km classical	2:27:44.3	+19:22.2	53
Miroslav Šulek	Men's 15 km freestyle	38:44.0	+5:00.1	80
Miroslav Šulek	Men's 50 km classical	DNF		
Alena Procházková	Women's 10 km freestyle	28:59.5	+3:59.0	58
Alena Procházková	Women's 30 km classical	1:36:50.0	+14:32.4	36

Sprint

Athlete	Event	Qualification		Quarterfinals		Semifinals		Final	
Athlete	Event	Time	Rank	Time	Rank	Time	Rank	Time	Rank
Peter Mlynár	Men's sprint	3:16.82	25 Q	3:15.77	5	Did not advance			
Andrej Segeč	Men's sprint	3:24.84	56	Did not advance					
Miroslav Šulek	Men's sprint	3:28.74	61	Did not advance					
Peter Mlynár; Andrej Segeč	Men's team sprint	—N/a				17:34.12	11	Did not advance	
Barbora Klementová	Women's sprint	3:38.00	53	Did not advance					
Alena Procházková	Women's sprint	3:24.61	31	Did not advance					
Barbora Klementová; Alena Procházková	Women's team sprint	—N/a				17:52.14	9	Did not advance	

Qualification legend: Q – Qualify on position in heat; q – Qualify on time in round

== Figure skating ==
Slovakia qualified one female figure skater, based on its placement at the 2017 World Figure Skating Championships in Helsinki, Finland. They additionally qualified one entry in ice dance through the 2017 CS Nebelhorn Trophy.

Athlete	Event	SP / SD		FS / FD		Total	
Athlete	Event	Points	Rank	Points	Rank	Points	Rank
Nicole Rajičová	Ladies' singles	60.59	13 Q	114.60	15	175.19	14
Lucie Myslivečková / Lukáš Csölley	Ice dancing	59.75	19 Q	82.82	20	142.57	20

== Ice hockey ==
Summary

Key:

- OT – Overtime
- GWS – Match decided by penalty-shootout

Team	Event	Group stage				Qualification playoff	Quarterfinal	Semifinal	Final / BM	
Team	Event	Opposition Score	Opposition Score	Opposition Score	Rank	Opposition Score	Opposition Score	Opposition Score	Opposition Score	Rank
Slovakia men's	Men's tournament	Olympic Athletes from Russia; W 3–2	United States; L 1–2	Slovenia; L 2–3 GWS	4	United States; L 1–5	Did not advance			11

=== Men's tournament ===
Slovakia men's national ice hockey team qualified by finishing as one of the top eight teams in the 2015 IIHF World Ranking.

Team roster

- Men's team event – 1 team of 25 players

The following is the Slovak roster for the men's ice hockey tournament at the 2018 Winter Olympics.

Head coach: (Canada) Craig Ramsay Assistant coaches: (Slovakia) Ján Lašák, (Slovakia) Vladimír Országh

No.	Pos.	Name	Height	Weight	Birthdate	Birthplace	2017–18 team
6	F	Lukáš Cingeľ	1.87 m (6 ft 2 in)	91 kg (201 lb)	10 June 1992	Žilina, Czechoslovakia	(Czech Republic) HK Hradec Králové (ELH)
7	D	Ivan Baranka	1.88 m (6 ft 2 in)	91 kg (201 lb)	19 May 1985	Ilava, Czechoslovakia	(Czech Republic) HC Vítkovice Ridera (ELH)
13	F	Michal Krištof	1.76 m (5 ft 9 in)	74 kg (163 lb)	11 October 1993	Nitra	(Slovakia) HK Nitra (SVK)
14	D	Peter Čerešňák	1.91 m (6 ft 3 in)	97 kg (214 lb)	26 January 1993	Trenčín	(Czech Republic) HC Škoda Plzeň (ELH)
16	D	Juraj Valach	2.02 m (6 ft 8 in)	101 kg (223 lb)	1 February 1989	Topoľčany, Czechoslovakia	(Czech Republic) Piráti Chomutov (ELH)
17	F	Miloš Bubela	1.88 m (6 ft 2 in)	88 kg (194 lb)	25 August 1992	Banská Bystrica, Czechoslovakia	(Slovakia) HC '05 Banská Bystrica (SVK)
18	F	Andrej Kudrna	1.89 m (6 ft 2 in)	97 kg (214 lb)	11 May 1991	Nové Zámky, Czechoslovakia	(Czech Republic) HC Sparta Praha (ELH)
19	D	Tomáš Starosta	1.81 m (5 ft 11 in)	91 kg (201 lb)	20 May 1981	Trenčín, Czechoslovakia	(Slovakia) HK Dukla Trenčín (SVK)
25	F	Marek Hovorka	1.78 m (5 ft 10 in)	84 kg (185 lb)	8 October 1984	Dubnica nad Váhom, Czechoslovakia	(Slovakia) HC Košice (SVK)
26	D	Juraj Mikuš	1.94 m (6 ft 4 in)	97 kg (214 lb)	30 November 1988	Trenčín, Czechoslovakia	(Czech Republic) HC Sparta Praha (ELH)
27	F	Ladislav Nagy – A	1.79 m (5 ft 10 in)	86 kg (190 lb)	1 June 1979	Šaca, Czechoslovakia	(Slovakia) HC Košice (SVK)
33	G	Patrik Rybár	1.90 m (6 ft 3 in)	83 kg (183 lb)	9 November 1993	Skalica	(Czech Republic) HK Hradec Králové (ELH)
42	G	Branislav Konrád	1.88 m (6 ft 2 in)	90 kg (200 lb)	10 October 1987	Nitra, Czechoslovakia	(Czech Republic) HC Olomouc (ELH)
43	F	Tomáš Surový – C	1.84 m (6 ft 0 in)	96 kg (212 lb)	24 September 1981	Banská Bystrica, Czechoslovakia	(Slovakia) HC '05 Banská Bystrica (SVK)
50	G	Ján Laco	1.85 m (6 ft 1 in)	95 kg (209 lb)	1 December 1981	Liptovský Mikuláš, Czechoslovakia	(Czech Republic) HC Sparta Praha (ELH)
51	D	Dominik Graňák – A	1.82 m (6 ft 0 in)	83 kg (183 lb)	11 June 1983	Havířov, Czechoslovakia	(Czech Republic) HK Hradec Králové (ELH)
56	D	Michal Čajkovský	1.92 m (6 ft 4 in)	107 kg (236 lb)	6 May 1992	Skalica, Czechoslovakia	(Russia) Avtomobilist Yekaterinburg (KHL)
63	F	Patrik Lamper	1.84 m (6 ft 0 in)	86 kg (190 lb)	10 March 1993	Banská Bystrica	(Slovakia) HC '05 Banská Bystrica (SVK)
65	F	Tomáš Marcinko	1.94 m (6 ft 4 in)	96 kg (212 lb)	11 April 1988	Poprad, Czechoslovakia	(Czech Republic) HC Oceláři Třinec (ELH)
67	F	Matej Paulovič	1.90 m (6 ft 3 in)	90 kg (200 lb)	13 January 1995	Topoľčany	(Slovakia) HK Nitra (SVK)
71	D	Marek Ďaloga	1.93 m (6 ft 4 in)	88 kg (194 lb)	10 March 1989	Zvolen, Czechoslovakia	(Czech Republic) HC Sparta Praha (ELH)
83	F	Martin Bakoš	1.88 m (6 ft 2 in)	93 kg (205 lb)	18 April 1990	Spišská Nová Ves, Czechoslovakia	(Czech Republic) HC Bílí Tygři Liberec (ELH)
85	F	Peter Ölvecký	1.88 m (6 ft 2 in)	94 kg (207 lb)	11 October 1985	Nové Zámky, Czechoslovakia	(Slovakia) HK Dukla Trenčín (SVK)
87	F	Marcel Haščák	1.82 m (6 ft 0 in)	95 kg (209 lb)	3 February 1987	Poprad, Czechoslovakia	(Czech Republic) HC Kometa Brno (ELH)
91	F	Matúš Sukeľ	1.76 m (5 ft 9 in)	77 kg (170 lb)	23 January 1996	Liptovský Mikuláš	(Slovakia) MHk 32 Liptovský Mikuláš (SVK)

Preliminary round

Pos	Team	Pld	W	OTW	OTL	L	GF	GA	GD	Pts	Qualification
1	Olympic Athletes from Russia	3	2	0	0	1	14	5	+9	6	Quarterfinals
2	Slovenia	3	0	2	0	1	8	12	−4	4 (Note: Slovenia 4 Pts; USA 4 Pts; Slovakia 1 Pts. Slovenia defeated USA 3–2 in overtime.)	Qualification playoffs
3	United States	3	1	0	1	1	4	8	−4	4	Qualification playoffs
4	Slovakia	3	1	0	1	1	6	7	−1	4	Qualification playoffs

Source: IIHF
Notes:

14 February 2018; 21:10	Slovakia	3–2 (2–2, 0–0, 1–0)	Olympic Athletes from Russia	Gangneung Hockey Centre, Pyeongchang; Attendance: 4,025

Game reference

Branislav Konrád
Goalies
Vasily Koshechkin
Referees:
(Canada) Brett Iverson
(Finland) Aleksi Rantala
Linesmen:
(Czech Republic) Vít Lederer
(Canada) Nathan Vanoosten

	0–1	02:54 – Gavrikov (Voinov, Shirokov)
	0–2	04:08 – Kaprizov (Gusev, Gavrikov)
Ölvecký (Graňák) – 16:05	1–2
Bakoš – 17:55	2–2
Čerešňák (Haščák, Bakoš) (PP) – 48:30	3–2

12 min
Penalties
10 min
19
Shots
22

16 February 2018; 12:10	United States	2–1 (1–1, 0–0, 1–0)	Slovakia	Gangneung Hockey Centre, Pyeongchang; Attendance: 5,652

Game reference

Ryan Zapolski
Goalies
Ján Laco
Referees:
(Canada) Olivier Gouin
(Switzerland) Tobias Wehrli
Linesmen:
(Switzerland) Nicolas Fluri
(Russia) Alexander Otmakhov

Donato (Terry, Bourque) (PP) – 07:10	1–0
	1–1	07:35 – Kudrna (Surový, Čajkovský)
Donato (Arcobello, Bourque) (PP) – 42:51	2–1

4 min
Penalties
10 min
31
Shots
22

17 February 2018; 21:10	Slovenia	3–2 GWS (0–0, 2–1, 0–1) (OT: 0–0) (SO: 1–0)	Slovakia	Kwandong Hockey Centre, Pyeongchang; Attendance: 4,085

Game reference

Gašper Krošelj
Goalies
Branislav Konrád
Referees:
(Czech Republic) Antonín Jeřábek
(United States) Timothy Mayer
Linesmen:
(Finland) Hannu Sormunen
(Finland) Sakari Suominen

Gregorc (Muršak, Kuralt) (PP) – 21:00	1–0
Kuralt (Muršak, Gregorc) (PP) – 24:16	2–0
	2–1	35:43 – Bubela (Čerešňák, Graňák) (PP)
	2–2	45:56 – Haščák (Graňák, Čerešňák)

Tičar
Urbas (miss)
Muršak (miss)
Sabolič (miss)
Jeglič
Shootout
(miss) Kudrna
(miss) Ölvecký
(miss) Bakoš
Nagy
(miss) Haščák
4 min
Penalties
8 min
30
Shots
25

Qualification playoff

20 February 2018; 12:10	United States	5–1 (0–0, 3–1, 2–0)	Slovakia	Gangneung Hockey Centre, Pyeongchang; Attendance: 6,391

Game reference

Ryan Zapolski
Goalies
Ján Laco
Referees:
(Finland) Aleksi Rantala
(Finland) Anssi Salonen
Linesmen:
(Sweden) Henrik Pihlblad
(Finland) Sakari Suominen

Donato (Gilroy, Terry) – 21:36	1–0
Wisniewski (Terry) (PP2) – 22:20	2–0
Arcobello (Terry) – 33:30	3–0
	3–1	36:54 – Čerešňák (Graňák, Nagy)
Roe (Little, O'Neill) – 49:52	4–1
Donato (Wisniewski) (PP) – 56:46	5–1

8 min
Penalties
33 min
33
Shots
23

== Luge ==
Based on the results from the World Cups during the 2017–18 Luge World Cup season, Slovakia qualified 4 sleds.

Athlete	Event	Run 1		Run 2		Run 3		Run 4		Total	
Athlete	Event	Time	Rank	Time	Rank	Time	Rank	Time	Rank	Time	Rank
Jozef Ninis	Men's singles	47.833	7	50.014	37	48.095	21	Eliminated		2:25.942	25
Jakub Šimoňák	Men's singles	51.724	38	48.690	30	48.522	27	Eliminated		2:28.936	35
Marek Solčanský; Karol Stuchlák	Men's doubles	46.780	15	46.811	17	—N/a				1:33.591	17
Katarína Šimoňáková	Women's singles	47.428	24	47.606	25	47.538	23	Eliminated		2:22.572	23

Mixed team relay

Athlete	Event	Run 1		Run 2		Run 3		Total	
Athlete	Event	Time	Rank	Time	Rank	Time	Rank	Time	Rank
Katarína Šimoňáková; Jozef Ninis; Marek Solčanský; Karol Stuchlák	Team relay	48.032	11	49.326	11	49.635	10	2:26.993	11

== Snowboarding ==
Freestyle

Athlete	Event	Qualification				Final				
Athlete	Event	Run 1	Run 2	Best	Rank	Run 1	Run 2	Run 3	Best	Rank
Klaudia Medlová	Women's big air	30.75	50.50	50.50	23	Did not advance				
Klaudia Medlová	Women's slopestyle	Canceled				26.16	34.00	CAN	34.00	24

Qualification Legend: QF – Qualify directly to final; QS – Qualify to semifinal
