= Žigmund Pálffy =

Slovak ice hockey player

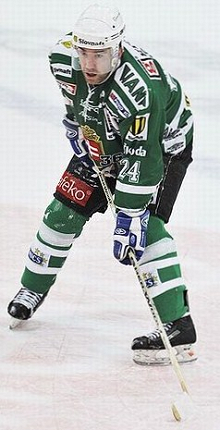
- Pálffy with HK Skalica in 2010
- Born: 5 May 1972 (age 54) Skalica, Czechoslovakia
- Height: 5 ft 10 in (178 cm)
- Weight: 180 lb (82 kg; 12 st 12 lb)
- Position: Right wing
- Shot: Left
- Played for: HK Nitra; Dukla Trenčín; New York Islanders; HK Skalica; Los Angeles Kings; Slavia Praha; Pittsburgh Penguins
- National team: Czechoslovakia and Slovakia
- NHL draft: 26th overall, 1991; New York Islanders
- Playing career: 1990–2013

Žigmund Pálffy (Slovak pronunciation: [ˈʐiɡmunt ˈpaːlfi]; born 5 May 1972), nicknamed "Ziggy" in English and "Žigo" in Slovak, is a Slovak former professional ice hockey player.

Pálffy played in the NHL for 12 years with the New York Islanders, Los Angeles Kings, and Pittsburgh Penguins between 1993 and 2006. He announced his retirement in January 2006 and his comeback from retirement in the summer of 2007. Pálffy signed a contract to play for his boyhood club HK 36 Skalica in the 2007–08 season and continued to do so until the end of his career. He also retracted his decision from 2005 never to play for the Slovak national team again by participating at the 2010 Winter Olympics in Vancouver, where he was also the flagbearer. In July 2013, he announced his definite retirement. Pálffy was inducted into the IIHF Hall of Fame in 2019.

== Playing career ==
Pálffy played with the Czechoslovakia national team in the 1991 World Junior Ice Hockey Championships and was drafted by the New York Islanders in the second round of the 1991 NHL Draft, 26th overall. After two more years in Slovakia, Pálffy came to North America for the 1993–94 season. He spent the majority of the 1993–94 season in the International Hockey League (IHL) with the Salt Lake Golden Eagles, while also making his NHL debut with the Islanders, appearing in five games, although he did not earn a single point. The following season, 1994–95, he split the year between the Islanders and the Denver Grizzlies of the IHL.

In his first game of 1995–96, his team went down one goal but Pálffy scored two goals to lead New York to a 2–1 win over the Florida Panthers. He scored 87 points in 81 games. The following two seasons were much the same for Pálffy, scoring 90 and 87 points respectively. During the 1998–99 season, Pálffy was limited to only 50 games but still scored 50 points. After the season, the Islanders traded him and Bryan Smolinski to the Los Angeles Kings in a deal that saw Olli Jokinen, Josh Green, Mathieu Biron and a first-round draft pick go to the Islanders.

After the 2004–05 NHL lockout, Pálffy signed with the Penguins for three years and US$13.5 million. After playing 42 games with the Penguins during the 2005–06 season, Pálffy retired from professional hockey. On January 18, 2006, then-Penguins general manager Craig Patrick told reporters Pálffy told him he was retiring due to a lingering shoulder injury. Pálffy completed his career with 329 goals and 384 assists for 713 points in 684 games over 12 NHL seasons.

Pálffy announced his comeback from retirement in the summer of 2007 and signed a contract to play for his hometown club of HK 36 Skalica for the entire 2007–08 season. He became the most productive player of the regular season in the Slovak Extraliga, where he led four seasons in points. In July 2013, before the start of the 2013–14 season, Pálffy formally announced his retirement from professional hockey. He said he was old enough and did not feel like playing and traveling with the team after so many years, but also that he was going to miss the game of hockey since he lived for it for almost 40 years.

== International play ==
Žigmund Pálffy
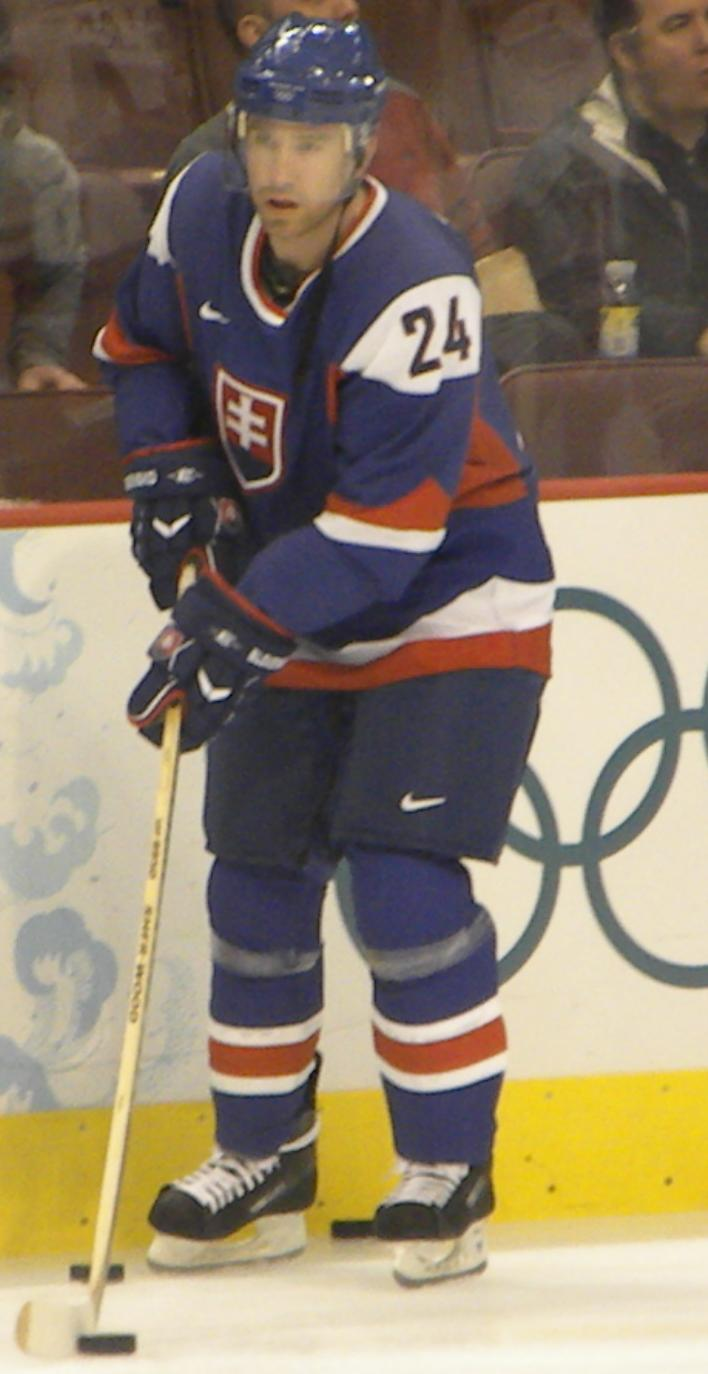
- Pálffy at the 2010 Winter Olympics.

Medal record

Representing Czechoslovakia

Ice hockey

World Junior Championships
Bronze medal – third place	1991 Saskatoon	

Representing Slovakia

World Championships
Gold medal – first place	2002 Gothenburg	
Bronze medal – third place	2003 Helsinki	

Pálffy represented Slovakia and Czechoslovakia in international competitions, winning a gold medal with Slovakia in the 2002 after he had assisted on Peter Bondra's tournament-winning goal 100 seconds to go in the third period. Following the 2005 World Championships in Austria, Pálffy announced his retirement from the Slovak national team. Five years later, Pálffy broke his retirement and was named to the Slovak national team for the 2010 Winter Olympics in Vancouver, recording three assists with the team for a total of three points in seven games.

== Career statistics ==
=== Regular season and playoffs ===
			Regular season					Playoffs
Season	Team	League	GP	G	A	Pts	PIM	GP	G	A	Pts	PIM
1990–91	AC/HC Nitra	TCH	50	34	16	50	18	—	—	—	—	—
1991–92	ASVŠ Dukla Trenčín	TCH	32	23	24	47	—	13	18	8	26	—
1992–93	ASVŠ Dukla Trenčín	TCH	32	28	29	57	—	11	10	12	22	—
1993–94	New York Islanders	NHL	5	0	0	0	0	—	—	—	—	—
1993–94	Salt Lake Golden Eagles	IHL	57	25	32	57	83	—	—	—	—	—
1994–95	New York Islanders	NHL	33	10	7	17	6	—	—	—	—	—
1994–95	Denver Grizzlies	IHL	33	20	23	43	40	—	—	—	—	—
1995–96	New York Islanders	NHL	81	43	44	87	56	—	—	—	—	—
1996–97	New York Islanders	NHL	80	48	42	90	43	—	—	—	—	—
1996–97	HC Dukla Trenčín	Slovak	1	0	0	0	—	—	—	—	—	—
1997–98	New York Islanders	NHL	82	45	42	87	34	—	—	—	—	—
1998–99	New York Islanders	NHL	50	22	28	50	34	—	—	—	—	—
1998–99	HK 36 Skalica	Slovak	9	11	8	19	6	—	—	—	—	—
1999–2000	Los Angeles Kings	NHL	64	27	39	66	32	4	2	0	2	0
2000–01	Los Angeles Kings	NHL	73	38	51	89	20	13	3	5	8	8
2001–02	Los Angeles Kings	NHL	63	32	27	59	26	7	4	5	9	0
2002–03	Los Angeles Kings	NHL	76	37	48	85	47	—	—	—	—	—
2003–04	Los Angeles Kings	NHL	35	16	25	41	12	—	—	—	—	—
2004–05	HK 36 Skalica	Slovak	8	10	3	13	6	—	—	—	—	—
2004–05	HC Slavia Praha	Czech	41	21	19	40	30	7	5	2	7	2
2005–06	Pittsburgh Penguins	NHL	42	11	31	42	12	—	—	—	—	—
2007–08	HK 36 Skalica	Slovak	46	30	45	75	93	13	7	17	24	26
2008–09	HK 36 Skalica	Slovak	53	52	47	99	46	17	12	15	27	12
2009–10	HK 36 Skalica	Slovak	36	17	36	53	28	6	6	6	12	18
2011–12	HK 36 Skalica	Slovak	48	26	57	83	76	6	3	4	7	6
2012–13	HK 36 Skalica	Slovak	39	26	47	73	103	7	3	5	8	2
NHL totals			684	329	384	713	322	24	9	10	19	8
Slovak totals			240	172	243	415	358	49	31	47	78	64

=== International statistics ===
Year	Team	Event	Result	GP	G	A	Pts	PIM
1991	Czechoslovakia	WJC	3rd place, bronze medalist(s)	7	7	6	13	2
1991	Czechoslovakia	CC	6th	5	1	0	1	2
1992	Czechoslovakia	WJC	5th	6	3	1	4	6
1994	Slovakia	Oly	6th	8	3	7	10	8
1996	Slovakia	WC	10th	5	2	0	2	10
1996	Slovakia	WCH	—	3	1	2	3	2
1999	Slovakia	WC	7th	6	5	5	10	6
2002	Slovakia	Oly	13th	1	0	0	0	0
2002	Slovakia	WC	1st place, gold medalist(s)	3	1	6	7	2
2003	Slovakia	WC	3rd place, bronze medalist(s)	9	7	8	15	18
2005	Slovakia	WC	5th	7	5	4	9	10
2010	Slovakia	Oly	4th	7	0	3	3	8
Junior totals				13	10	7	17	8
Senior totals				54	25	35	60	66

== Awards and honours ==
Award	Year
Czechoslovak Extraliga
TCH Champion	1992
Leading Scorer	1992, 1993
Most Goals	1992
Most Assists	1993
Rookie of the Year	1991
NHL
All-Star	1997, 1998, 2001, 2002
Slovak Extraliga
All-Star Team	2008, 2009, 2010, 2012, 2013
Leading Scorer	2008, 2009, 2012, 2013
Most Goals	2009
Most Assists	2012
International
World Championship points leader	2003
Winter Olympics points leader and assists	1994
IIHF Hall of Fame	2019
IIHF All-Time Slovakia Team	2020

1998 Ryan Raasch Award

== Transactions ==
- June 9, 1991 – Drafted 26th overall in the 1991 NHL entry draft by the New York Islanders.
- June 19, 1999 – Traded to the Los Angeles Kings with Bryan Smolinski, Marcel Cousineau & a 1999 4th round pick (Daniel Johansson) for Olli Jokinen, Josh Green, Mathieu Biron & a 1999 1st round pick (Taylor Pyatt).
- September 15, 2004 – Signed to a lockout contract by SK Slavia Prague.
- October 7, 2004 – Signed to a lockout contract by HK 36 Skalica.
- November 16, 2004 – Signed to a lockout contract by SK Slavia Praha.
- August 6, 2005 – Signed by the Pittsburgh Penguins.
- January 18, 2006 – Announced his first retirement.
- July 19, 2007 – Signed by HK 36 Skalica (comeback).
- September 15, 2011 – Re-signed by HK 36 Skalica.
- July 31, 2013 – Announced his second retirement.

== See also ==
- Slovaks in the NHL

Olympic Games
Preceded by Walter Marx	Flagbearer for Slovakia; Vancouver 2010	Succeeded by Zdeno Chára
