= Marek Hrivík =

Slovak ice hockey player (born 1991)

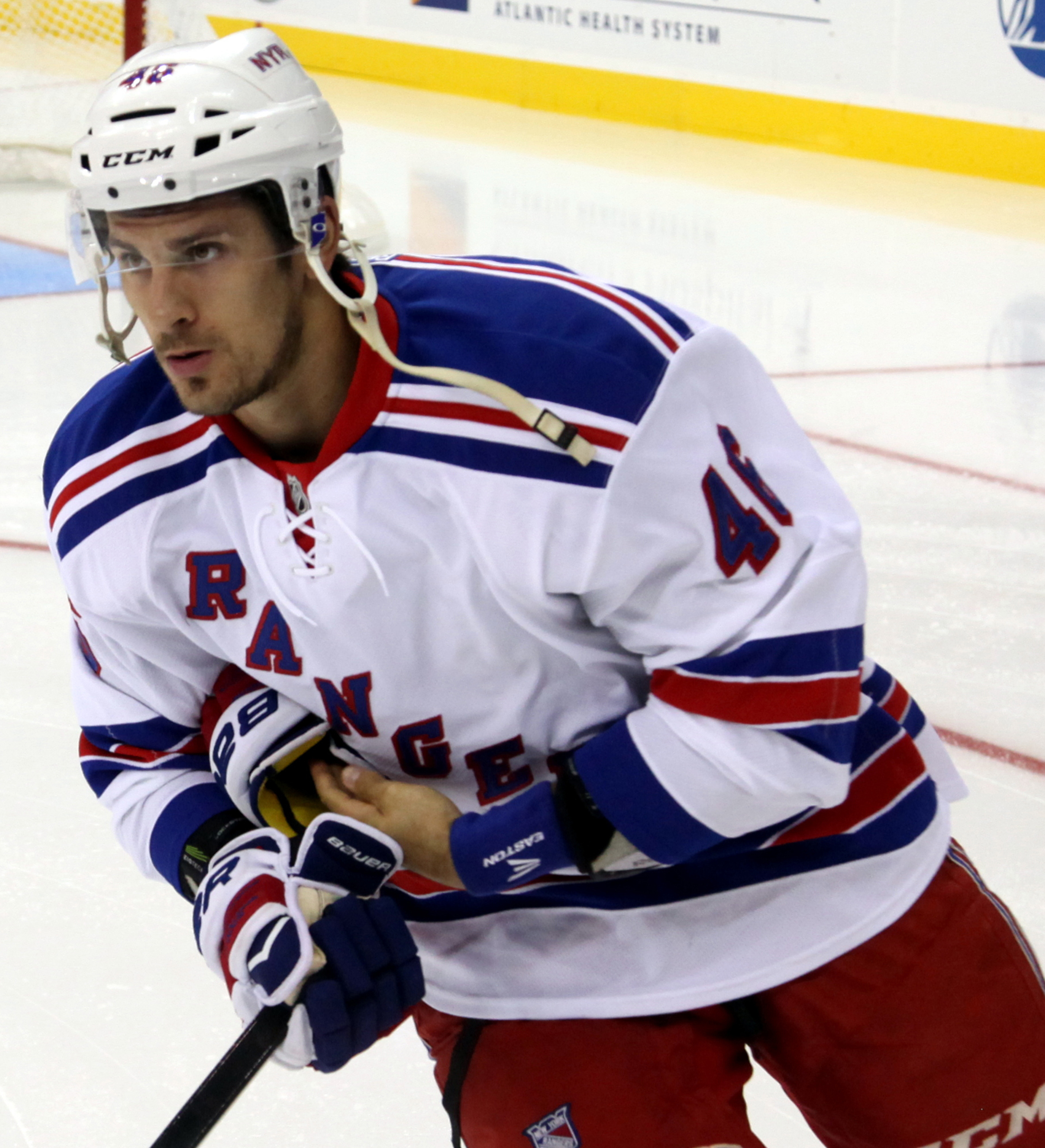
- Hrivík with the New York Rangers in 2014
- Born: August 28, 1991 (age 34) Čadca, Czechoslovakia
- Height: 6 ft 2 in (188 cm)
- Weight: 205 lb (93 kg; 14 st 9 lb)
- Position: Forward
- Shoots: Left
- ELH team Former teams: HC Vítkovice Ridera; New York Rangers; Calgary Flames; HC Vityaz; Torpedo Nizhny Novgorod; Leksands IF
- National team: Slovakia
- NHL draft: Undrafted
- Playing career: 2008–present

Marek Hrivík (born August 28, 1991) is a Slovak professional ice hockey player who is a forward for HC Vítkovice Ridera of the Czech Extraliga (ELH).

== Playing career ==
Hrivík won the President's Cup in 2009–10 with the Moncton Wildcats of the Quebec Major Junior Hockey League. On May 30, 2012, Hrivík signed his first NHL contract on a three-year entry-level contract with the New York Rangers.

He made his NHL debut for the Rangers in a game against the Detroit Red Wings on February 21, 2016.

On July 1, 2017, after five full seasons within the Rangers organization, Hrivík left as a free agent and was signed to a one-year, two-way contract with the Calgary Flames. In the 2017–18 season, he was first assigned to AHL affiliate, the Stockton Heat. Having suffered through injury, Hrivík responded to produce 30 points in 32 games. He was later recalled to appear in 3 scoreless games with the Flames.

Opting to leave the Flames in the off-season, Hrivík continued his career abroad, agreeing to a one-year deal with Russian club HC Vityaz of the KHL on July 1, 2018. In the 2018–19 season, Hrivík added eight goals and 15 points in 26 games with Vityaz before his season was cut short due to injury.

As a free agent, Hrivík left the KHL and agreed to a one-year deal with the newly promoted Swedish club, Leksands IF of the Swedish Hockey League (SHL), on 16 August 2019.

Hrivík remained with Leksands for the 2020–21 season, increasing his scoring output to lead the team and the league in scoring with 37 assists and 51 points in just 44 regular season games. He was selected as the SHL's forward of the year and was awarded the Guldhjälmen as the SHL's most valuable player.

On 1 May 2021, Hrivík opted to leave the SHL and return to the KHL, signing a one-year contract with Russian outfit Torpedo Nizhny Novgorod. In the 2021–22 season, Hrivík contributed offensively with nine goals and 23 points through 44 regular season games. With Torpedo missing the post-season for the first time in 9 years, Hrivík continued his season by returning to his former club, Leksands IF of the SHL, on 15 February 2022.

On 25 April 2025, Hrivík moved closer to home, signing a three-year contract with HC Vítkovice Ridera in the Czech Extraliga. The Czech city of Ostrava, where the Vítkovice club is located, is less than 50 kilometres from Hrivík's hometown of Čadca.

== Career statistics ==
=== Regular season and playoffs ===
Bold indicates led league

			Regular season					Playoffs
Season	Team	League	GP	G	A	Pts	PIM	GP	G	A	Pts	PIM
2006–07	MsHK Žilina	SVK U18	54	26	23	49	12	—	—	—	—	—
2007–08	MsHK Žilina	SVK U18	8	4	5	9	54	—	—	—	—	—
2007–08	MsHK Žilina	SVK U20	49	17	19	36	24	—	—	—	—	—
2008–09	HK Orange 20	Slovak	34	8	6	14	10	—	—	—	—	—
2009–10	Moncton Wildcats	QMJHL	66	26	29	55	14	21	5	12	17	8
2010–11	Moncton Wildcats	QMJHL	59	38	41	79	18	4	0	6	6	11
2011–12	Moncton Wildcats	QMJHL	54	29	41	70	8	4	1	2	3	0
2011–12	Connecticut Whale	AHL	8	1	0	1	0	9	5	4	9	10
2012–13	Connecticut Whale	AHL	40	7	19	26	10	—	—	—	—	—
2013–14	Hartford Wolf Pack	AHL	74	13	14	27	22	—	—	—	—	—
2014–15	Hartford Wolf Pack	AHL	72	12	21	33	12	15	3	6	9	6
2015–16	Hartford Wolf Pack	AHL	68	12	29	41	18	—	—	—	—	—
2015–16	New York Rangers	NHL	5	0	1	1	0	—	—	—	—	—
2016–17	Hartford Wolf Pack	AHL	56	16	24	40	12	—	—	—	—	—
2016–17	New York Rangers	NHL	16	0	2	2	2	—	—	—	—	—
2017–18	Stockton Heat	AHL	32	11	19	30	8	—	—	—	—	—
2017–18	Calgary Flames	NHL	3	0	0	0	0	—	—	—	—	—
2018–19	HC Vityaz	KHL	26	8	7	15	4	—	—	—	—	—
2019–20	Leksands IF	SHL	46	12	18	30	12	—	—	—	—	—
2020–21	Leksands IF	SHL	44	14	**37**	**51**	26	4	0	2	2	2
2021–22	Torpedo Nizhny Novgorod	KHL	44	9	14	23	16	—	—	—	—	—
2021–22	Leksands IF	SHL	11	3	3	6	0	3	1	1	2	2
2022–23	Leksands IF	SHL	23	2	12	14	4	3	0	0	0	0
2023–24	Leksands IF	SHL	46	15	11	26	16	2	0	1	1	0
2024–25	Leksands IF	SHL	27	2	11	13	6	—	—	—	—	—
2025–26	HC Vítkovice Ridera	ELH	42	6	18	24	16	3	1	0	1	2
NHL totals			24	0	3	3	2	—	—	—	—	—
KHL totals			70	17	21	38	20	—	—	—	—	—
SHL totals			197	48	92	140	64	12	1	4	5	4

=== International ===
Medal record

Representing Slovakia

Olympics
Bronze medal – third place	2022 Beijing	

Year	Team	Event	Result	GP	G	A	Pts	PIM
2008	Slovakia	U17	10th	5	2	1	3	4
2008	Slovakia	WJC18	7th	6	1	0	1	2
2009	Slovakia	WJC18	7th	6	2	3	5	0
2009	Slovakia	WJC	4th	7	1	0	1	2
2011	Slovakia	WJC	8th	6	2	0	2	2
2014	Slovakia	WC	9th	6	0	0	0	0
2021	Slovakia	WC	8th	7	2	4	6	0
2021	Slovakia	OGQ	Q	3	0	1	1	0
2022	Slovakia	OG	3rd place, bronze medalist(s)	7	2	2	4	2
2023	Slovakia	WC	9th	7	2	4	6	2
2024	Slovakia	WC	7th	7	2	2	4	2
2024	Slovakia	OGQ	Q	3	1	2	3	0
2026	Slovakia	WC	9th	7	4	2	6	2
Junior totals				30	8	4	12	10
Senior totals				47	13	17	30	8

== Awards and honors ==
Award	Year
SHL
Forward of the Year	2021
Guldhjälmen	2021

Olympic Games
Preceded by Veronika Velez-Zuzulová	Flagbearer for Slovakia; Beijing 2022 together with Katarína Šimoňáková	Succeeded by Incumbent
