= Róbert Kresťanko =

Slovak bobsledder

Personal information
- Nationality: Slovak
- Born: 26 June 1972 (age 52); Bojnice, Czechoslovakia

Sport
- Sport: Bobsleigh

Róbert Kresťanko (born 26 June 1972) is a Slovak bobsledder who competed at the 2002 Winter Olympics and 2006 Winter Olympics.

== Career ==
At the 2000–01 Bobsleigh World Cup, Kresťanko teamed up with Milan Jagnešák in the two-man bobsleigh category, finishing 30th place. They also at the finished 25th, 8th, and 27th places – respectively in the 2006–07 Bobsleigh World Cup, 2008–09 Bobsleigh World Cup, 2009–10 seasons.

At the 2006 Winter Olympics, Kresťanko teamed up in a four-man bobsleigh team with Jagnešák, Viktor Rájek, and Andrej Benda. However, Kresťanko suffered a shoulder injury during training session.
