= Ľubomír Machyniak =

Slovak biathlete (born 1971)

Personal information
- Nationality: Slovak
- Born: 7 February 1971 (age 54); Brezno, Czechoslovakia

Sport
- Sport: Biathlon

Ľubomír Machyniak (born 7 February 1971) is a Slovak biathlete. He competed in the men's 20 km individual event at the 1998 Winter Olympics.

His daughters Veronika and Júlia are also biathletes.
