= Michal Rajčan =

Slovak alpine skier (born 1982)

Michal Rajčan (born 1 October 1980 in Banská Bystrica) is a Slovak former alpine skier who competed in the 2002 Winter Olympics.
