= Soňa Moravčíková =

Slovak alpine skier (born 1999)

Personal information
- Nationality: Slovak
- Born: 5 December 1999 (age 25); Bratislava, Slovakia

Sport
- Sport: Alpine skiing

Soňa Moravčíková (born 5 December 1999) is a Slovak alpine skier. She competed in the women's giant slalom at the 2018 Winter Olympics.
