= Mária Jasenčáková =

Slovak luger

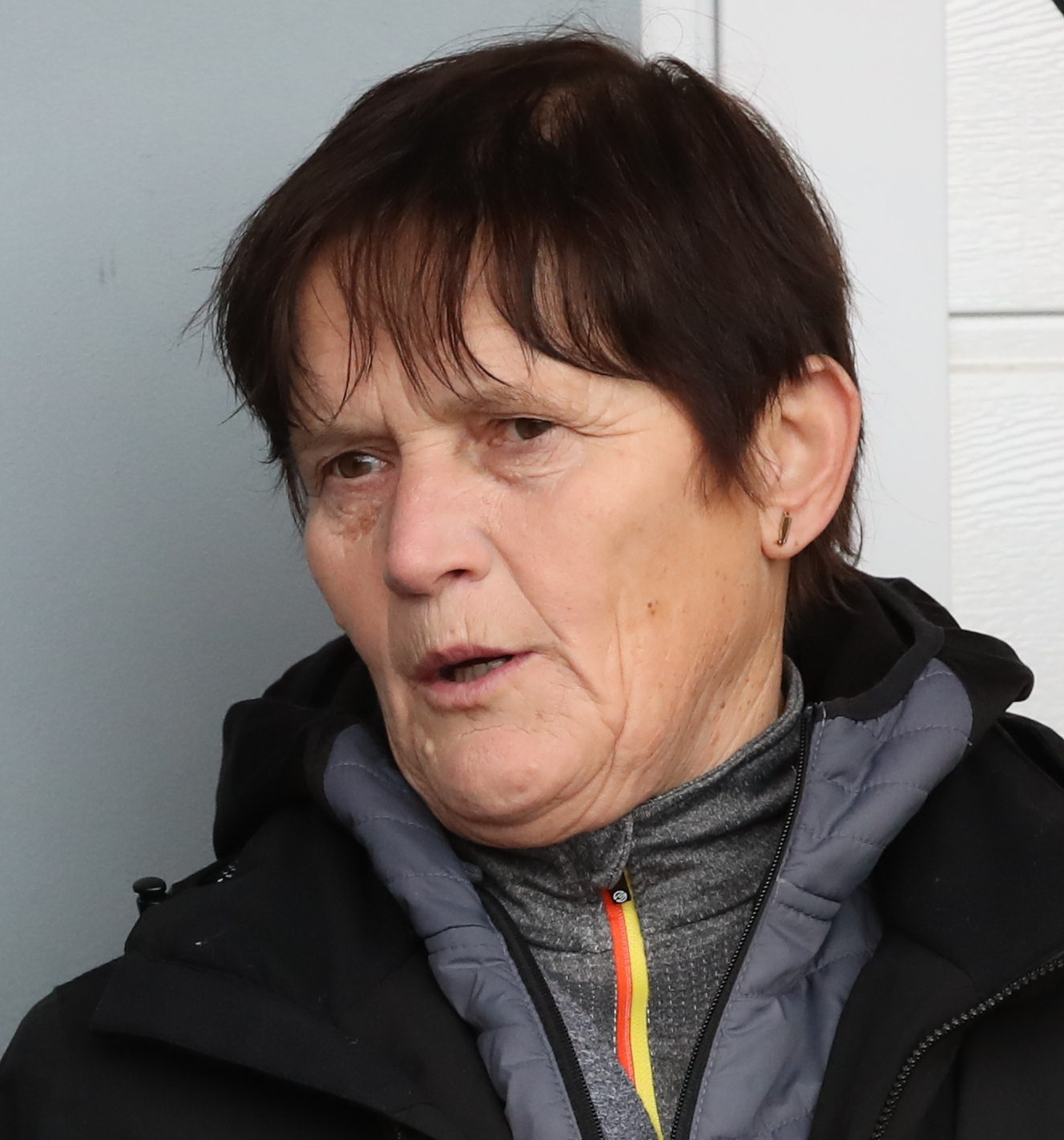
Mária Jasenčáková (2019)

Mária Jasenčáková, born 21 October 1957 in Spišská Sobota, Poprad, Czechoslovakia, is a Slovak luger who competed at five Olympic Games between 1980 and 1998. She is the first Slovak to compete at five Olympics.

== See also ==
- List of athletes with the most appearances at Olympic Games
