= Jaroslav Slávik =

Slovak luger

Personal information
- Born: 28 January 1976 (age 50) Poprad, Czechoslovakia

Sport
- Country: Slovakia
- Sport: Luge
Medal record
European Championships
Bronze medal – third place	2004 Oberhof	Men's singles

Jaroslav Slávik (born 28 January 1976 in Poprad) is a Slovak luger who competed from 1990 to 2006. He won the bronze medal in the men's singles event at the 2004 FIL European Luge Championships in Oberhof, Germany.

Slávik's best finish at the Winter Olympics was 16th in the men's singles event at Salt Lake City in 2002 while his best World championship finish was tenth in the men's singles event at Park City in 2005.
