= Matúš Užák =

Slovak speed skater

Personal information
- Nationality: Slovak
- Born: 13 April 1981 (age 43); Spišská Nová Ves, Czechoslovakia

Sport
- Sport: Short track speed skating

Matúš Užák (born 13 April 1981) is a Slovak short track speed skater. He competed at the 2002 Winter Olympics and the 2006 Winter Olympics.
