= Jana Šedová =

Slovak snowboarder

Personal information
- Nationality: Slovak
- Born: 16 January 1974 (age 51); Bratislava, Czechoslovakia

Sport
- Sport: Snowboarding

Jana Šedová (born 16 January 1974) is a Slovak snowboarder. She competed at the 1998 Winter Olympics and the 2002 Winter Olympics.
