= Ľubomír Mick =

Slovak luger (born 1978)

Ľubomír Mick (born 17 May 1978 in Poprad) is a Slovak luger who competed from 1993 to 2006. Competing in two Winter Olympics, he earned his best finish of ninth in the men's doubles event at Salt Lake City in 2002.

Mick's best finish at the FIL World Luge Championships was seventh in the men's doubles event at Park City, Utah in 2005.
