= Ivan Majeský =

Slovak former ice hockey defenceman (born 1976)

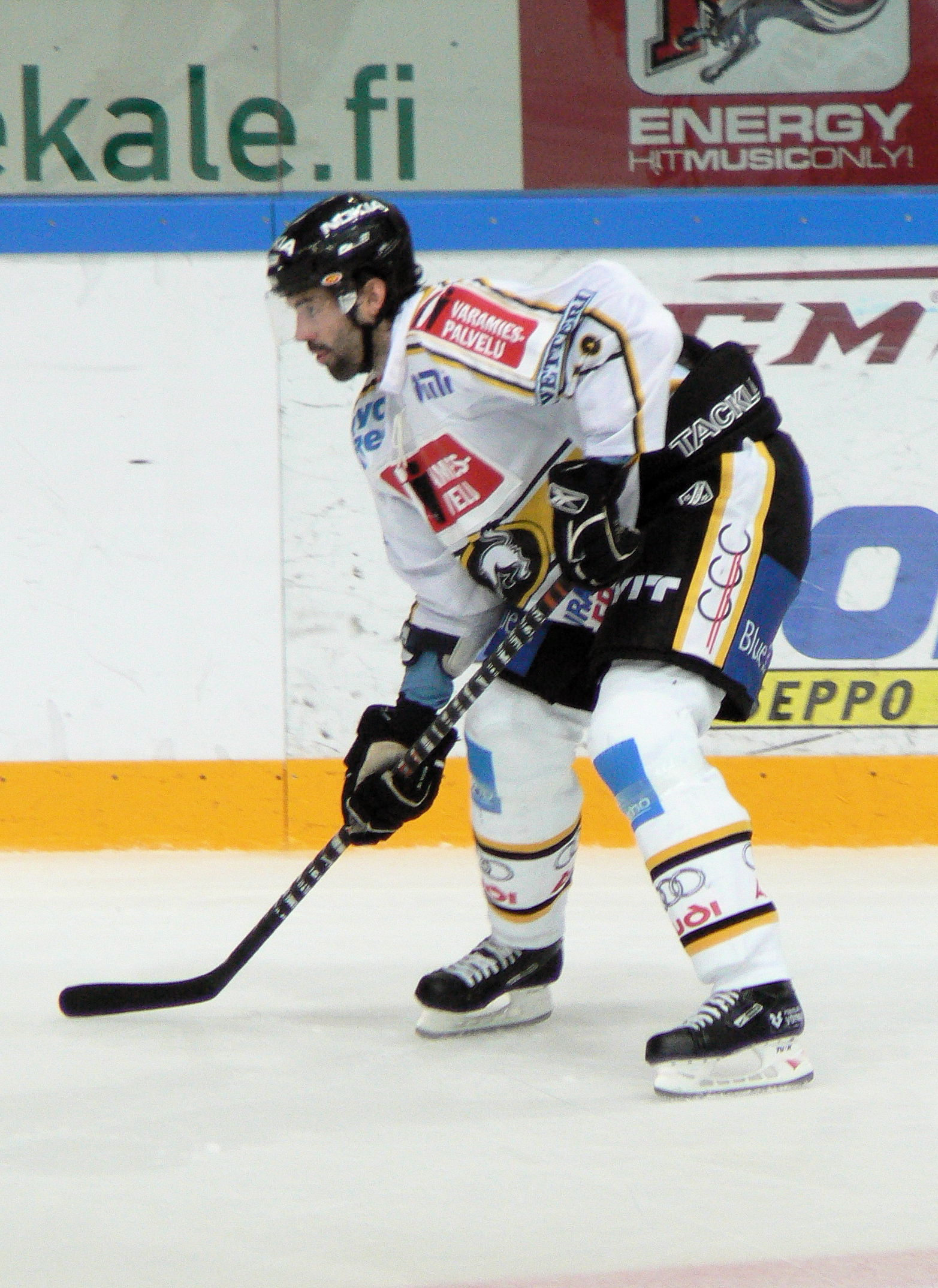
- Born: 2 September 1976 (age 49) Banská Bystrica, Czechoslovakia
- Height: 6 ft 5 in (196 cm)
- Weight: 234 lb (106 kg; 16 st 10 lb)
- Position: Defence
- Shot: Right
- Played for: Ilves; Florida Panthers; Atlanta Thrashers; HC Sparta Praha; Washington Capitals; Kärpät; Skellefteå; Linköpings HC
- National team: Slovakia
- NHL draft: 267th overall, 2001; Florida Panthers
- Playing career: 1995–2016

Ivan Majeský (born 2 September 1976) is a Slovak former ice hockey defenceman.

== Playing career ==
Majeský was drafted by the Florida Panthers 267th overall in the 2001 NHL entry draft and played a full season with the Panthers scoring 4 goals and 8 assists for 12 points. On 21 June 2003, Majeský was traded to the Atlanta Thrashers for a Round 2 pick (Kamil Kreps), where he scored 3 goals and 7 assists for 10 points in 63 regular season games for Atlanta. During the 2004–05 NHL lockout, which resulted in the cancellation of the 2004–05 NHL season, Majeský played in the Czech Republic for HC Sparta Praha before joining the Washington Capitals. It's with the Capitals where Majeský is famous with North American fans for his only goal for the team, a 170–foot shot from his own end that somehow managed to bounce past Pittsburgh Penguins goalie Sébastien Caron. Before his NHL career began, Majeský played in Finland for Ilves.

On 22 September 2006, Linköpings HC announced that Majeský signed a contract lasting season 2006–07 with the Swedish club. Until mid-October he played for Kärpät in the Finnish SM-liiga before coming to Sweden.

On 3 July 2009, Majeský signed with Skellefteå AIK on loan.

In December 2011, Majeský re-signed with Linköpings HC.

== Career statistics ==
=== Regular season and playoffs ===
			Regular season					Playoffs
Season	Team	League	GP	G	A	Pts	PIM	GP	G	A	Pts	PIM
1995–96	Iskra Zlatý Bažant Banská Bystrica	SVK	17	0	0	0	18	—	—	—	—	—
1996–97	Iskra Zlatý Bažant Banská Bystrica	SVK	49	2	4	6	—	—	—	—	—	—
1997–98	Iskra Zlatý Bažant Banská Bystrica	SVK.2	—	—	—	—	—	—	—	—	—	—
1998–99	Iskra Zlatý Bažant Banská Bystrica	SVK	48	7	7	14	68	6	0	2	2	2
1999–2000	HKM Zvolen	SVK	51	7	9	16	68	10	0	4	4	2
2000–01	Ilves	SM-liiga	54	2	14	16	99	9	0	1	1	6
2001–02	Ilves	SM-liiga	44	6	6	12	84	—	—	—	—	—
2002–03	Florida Panthers	NHL	82	4	8	12	92	—	—	—	—	—
2003–04	Atlanta Thrashers	NHL	63	3	7	10	76	—	—	—	—	—
2004–05	HC Sparta Praha	ELH	28	2	6	8	40	5	2	1	3	6
2005–06	Washington Capitals	NHL	57	1	8	9	66	—	—	—	—	—
2006–07	Kärpät	SM-liiga	12	2	4	6	18	—	—	—	—	—
2006–07	Linköpings HC	SEL	46	0	2	2	83	15	1	4	5	43
2007–08	Kärpät	SM-liiga	12	1	1	2	6	—	—	—	—	—
2007–08	Linköpings HC	SEL	44	2	6	8	60	16	0	1	1	34
2008–09	HIFK	SM-liiga	5	0	3	3	6	—	—	—	—	—
2008–09	Linköpings HC	SEL	40	1	8	9	54	5	0	0	0	4
2009–10	HC GEUS OKNA Kladno	ELH	7	2	2	4	16	—	—	—	—	—
2009–10	Skellefteå AIK	SEL	53	3	12	15	76	12	1	5	6	16
2010–11	Skellefteå AIK	SEL	44	1	8	9	28	16	0	3	3	24
2011–12	Rytíři Kladno	ELH	20	1	8	9	20	—	—	—	—	—
2011–12	Linköpings HC	SEL	22	0	3	3	18	—	—	—	—	—
2012–13	Rytíři Kladno	ELH	36	1	5	6	52	—	—	—	—	—
2012–13	Jokerit	SM-liiga	18	1	2	3	18	6	0	1	1	8
2013–14	Rytíři Kladno	ELH	31	0	6	6	38	—	—	—	—	—
2014–15	HC Olomouc	ELH	42	3	5	8	139	—	—	—	—	—
2015–16	HC ’05 iClinic Banská Bystrica	SVK	6	0	0	0	2	17	1	3	4	10
2016–17	HC ’05 iClinic Banská Bystrica	SVK	3	0	0	0	4	—	—	—	—	—
SVK totals			174	16	20	36	160	33	1	9	10	14
NHL totals			202	8	23	31	234	—	—	—	—	—
SEL totals			249	7	39	46	319	64	2	13	15	121

=== International ===
Ivan Majeský
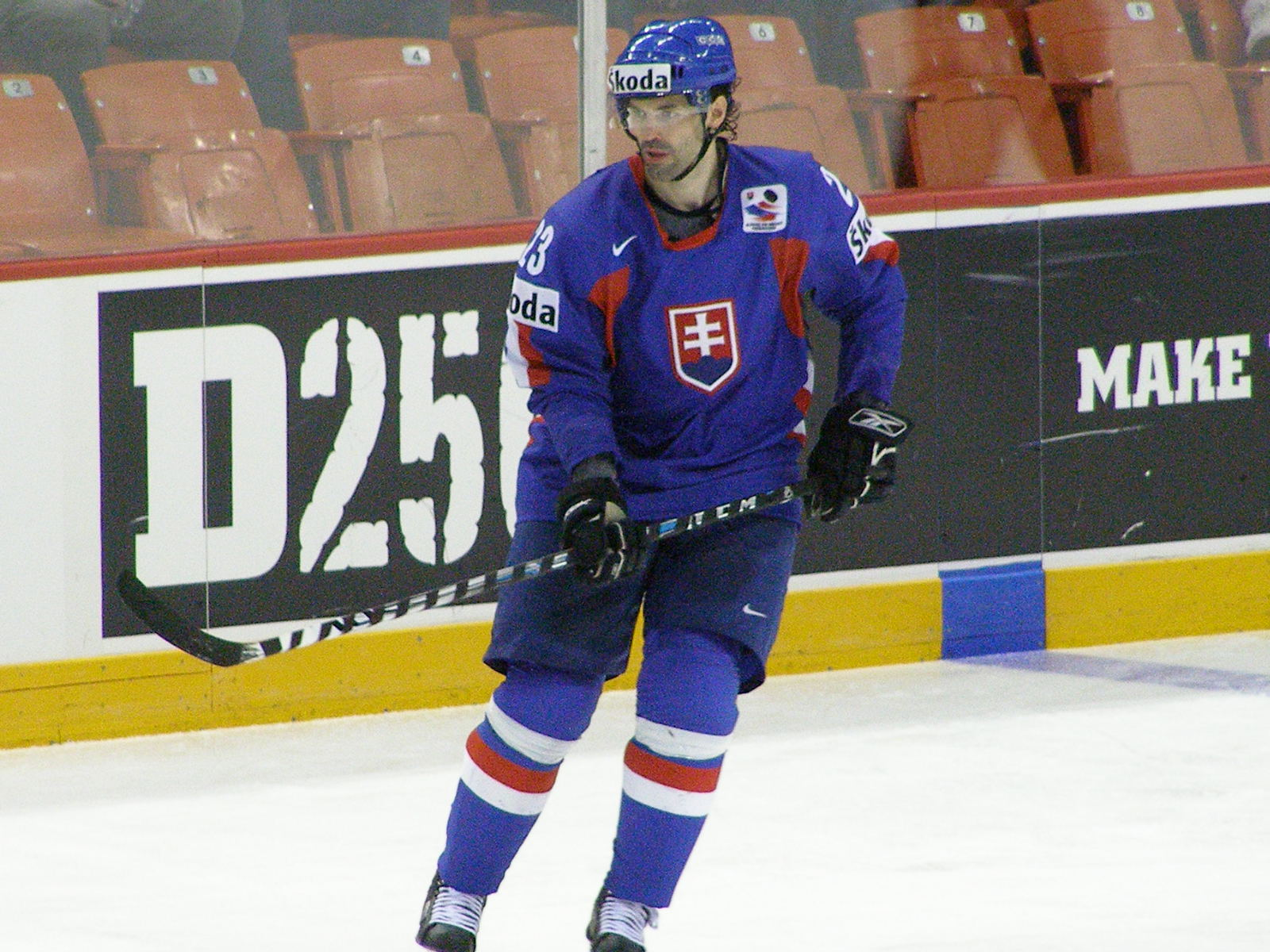
- Majeský at the 2008 IIHF World Championship

Medal record

Men's ice hockey

World Championships
Bronze medal – third place	2003	Slovakia

Year	Team	Event	GP	G	A	Pts	PIM
2002	Slovakia	OG	4	0	1	1	4
2003	Slovakia	WC	9	0	0	0	4
2004	Slovakia	WC	9	0	0	0	6
2005	Slovakia	WC	1	0	0	0	0
2006	Slovakia	OG	6	0	0	0	4
2008	Slovakia	WC	5	0	0	0	8
2010	Slovakia	WC	6	1	1	2	0
2011	Slovakia	WC	6	0	2	2	6
Senior totals			46	1	4	5	32
