= Viktor Rájek =

Slovak athlete (born 1985)

Personal information
- Born: 15 April 1985 (age 41) Žilina, Czechoslovakia
- Height: 1.91 m (6 ft 3 in)

Sport
- Sport: Bobsleigh
- Club: ŠBK Baret Security Bratislava

Viktor Rájek (born 15 April 1985) is a Slovak bobsledder and American football player. He competed in the two man event, finishing 25th, and the four-man event, finishing 20th, at the 2006 Winter Olympics.

In addition to bobsleigh, Rájek played American football for the Akron Zips. He graduated from the University of Akron in 2009, eventually settling in Vienna.
