= Miroslav Šulek =

Slovak cross-country skier

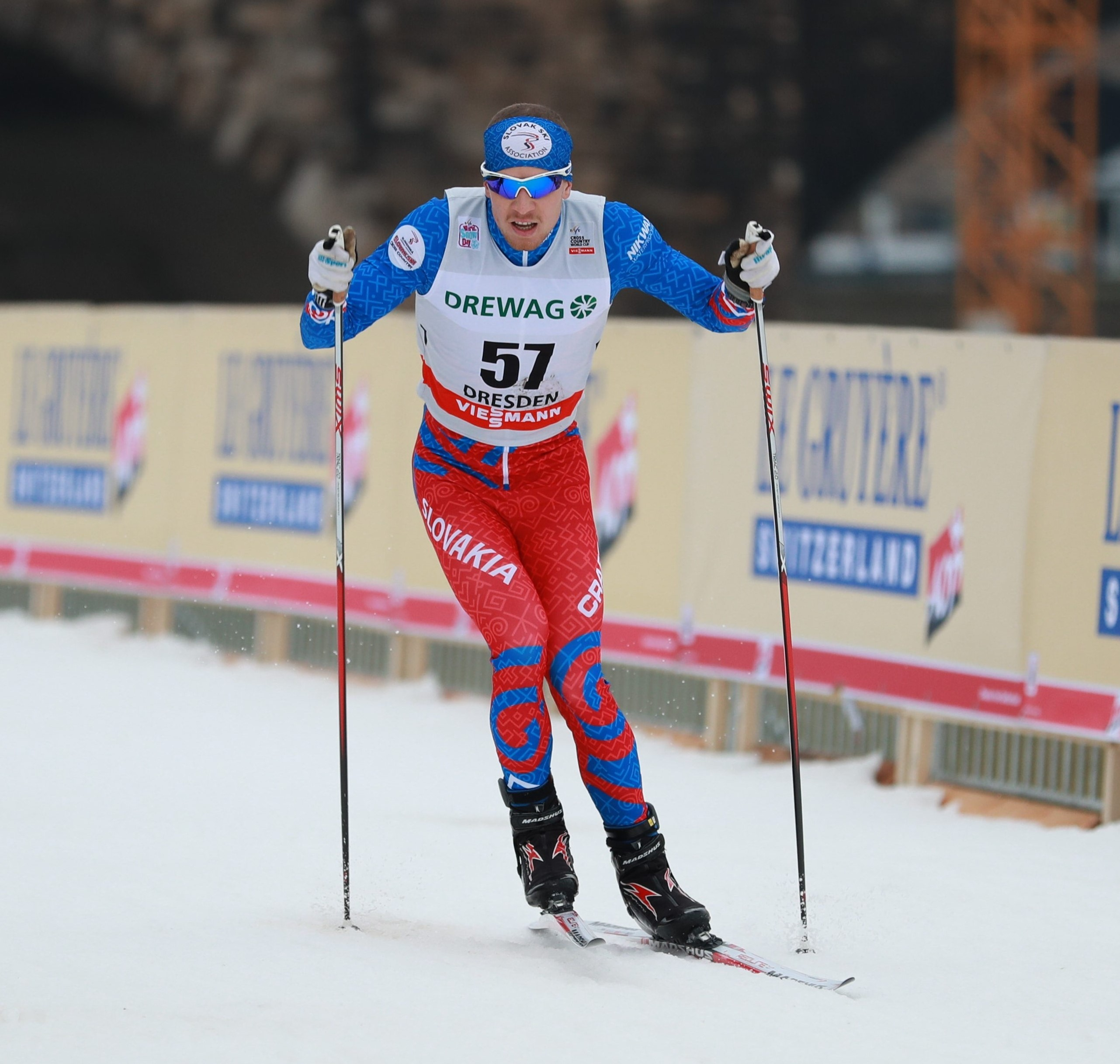
- Šulek in 2018

Personal information
- Nationality: Slovak
- Born: 16 March 1993 (age 32); Zvolen, Slovakia

Sport
- Sport: Cross-country skiing

Miroslav Šulek (born 16 March 1993) is a Slovak cross-country skier. He competed in the 2018 Winter Olympics.
