= Marcela Pavkovčeková =

Slovak biathlete (born 1977)

Personal information
- Nationality: Slovak
- Born: 21 April 1977 (age 49) Liptovský Mikuláš, Czechoslovakia

Sport
- Sport: Biathlon
Medal record
Biathlon
Representing Slovakia
Winter Universiade
| Silver medal – second place | 1999 Poprad-Tatry | 7.5 km sprint |
Junior World Championships
| Silver medal – second place | 1997 Forni Avoltri | 12.5 km individual |

Marcela Pavkovčeková (born 21 April 1977) is a Slovak biathlete. She competed at the 2002 Winter Olympics and the 2006 Winter Olympics.
