= Soňa Mihoková =

Slovak biathlete (born 1971)

Soňa Mihoková (born 11 November 1971 in Liptovský Mikuláš) is a Slovak biathlete. She finished 4th in the sprint at the 1998 Winter Olympics.
