= Róbert Petrovický =

Slovak ice hockey player (born 1973)

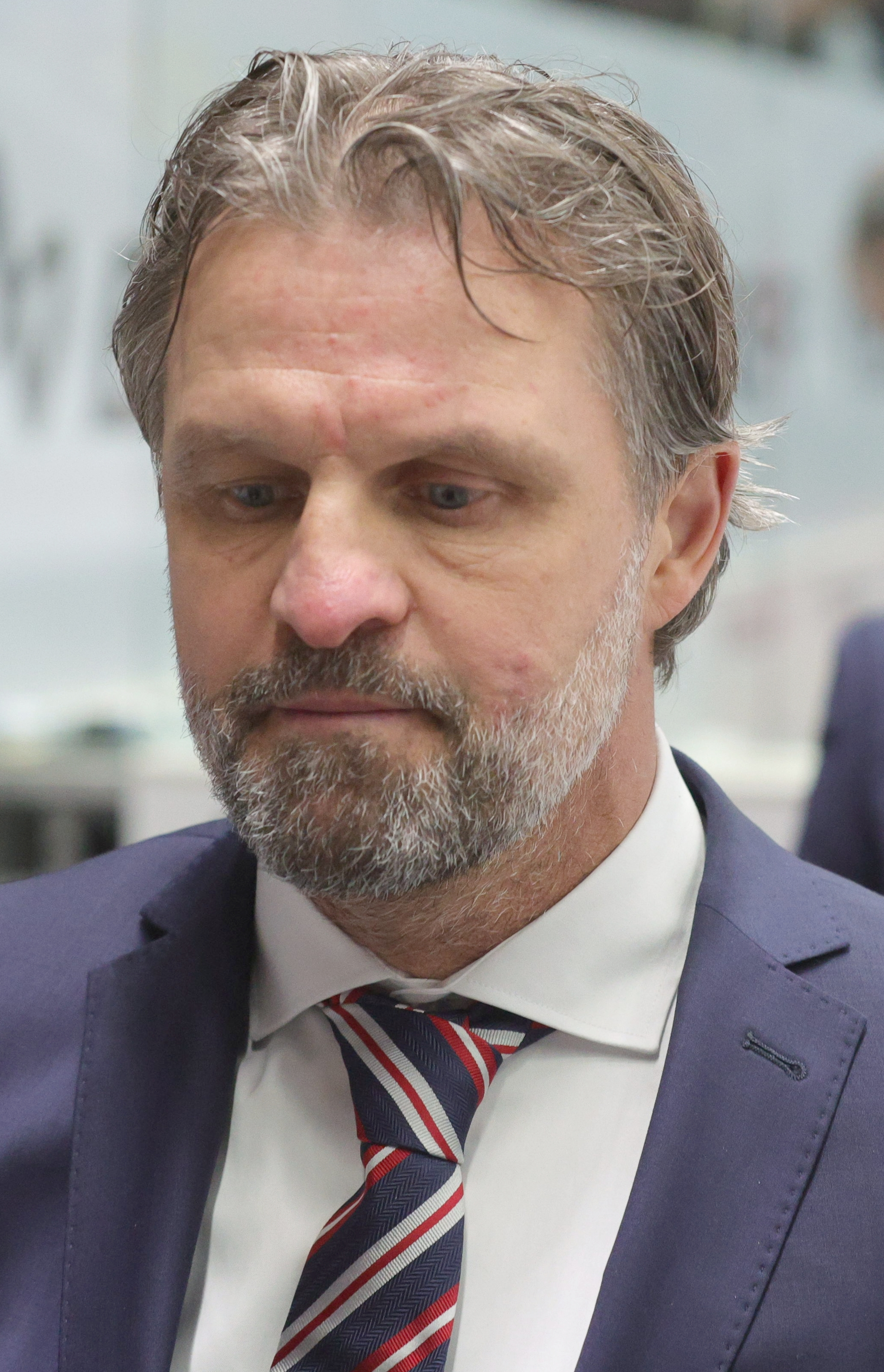
- Róbert Petrovický, 2024
- Born: 26 October 1973 (age 52) Košice, Czechoslovakia
- Height: 5 ft 11 in (180 cm)
- Weight: 172 lb (78 kg; 12 st 4 lb)
- Position: Centre
- Shot: Left
- SM-liiga team Former teams: KalPa; Hartford Whalers; Dallas Stars; St. Louis Blues; Tampa Bay Lightning; New York Islanders; Modo Hockey; HC Ambri-Piotta; SC Langnau Tigers; ZSC Lions HC Dukla Trenčín; HC Vítkovice; Dynamo Riga
- National team: Slovakia
- NHL draft: 9th overall, 1992; Hartford Whalers
- Playing career: 1990–2016

Róbert Petrovický (Slovak pronunciation: [ˈrɔːbert ˈpetrɔʋitskiː]; born 26 October 1973) is a Slovak former professional ice hockey right winger. He played in the NHL for the Hartford Whalers, Dallas Stars, St. Louis Blues, Tampa Bay Lightning and the New York Islanders. In 2009/2010 season he played for Dinamo Riga in the Kontinental Hockey League. He captained team Slovakia at the 2002 Winter Olympics. Petrovicky was the last Hartford Whaler and Springfield Indian to be active in professional hockey.

== Personal life ==
Robert's son, Rayen, is an ice hockey player for TUTO Hockey of the Mestis.

== Career statistics ==
=== Regular season and playoffs ===
			Regular season					Playoffs
Season	Team	League	GP	G	A	Pts	PIM	GP	G	A	Pts	PIM
1990–91	ASVŠ Dukla Trenčín	TCH	33	9	14	23	12	—	—	—	—	—
1991–92	ASVŠ Dukla Trenčín	TCH	33	17	25	42	28	13	8	11	19	6
1992–93	Hartford Whalers	NHL	42	3	6	9	45	—	—	—	—	—
1992–93	Springfield Indians	AHL	16	5	3	8	39	15	5	6	11	14
1993–94	Dukla Trenčín	SVK	1	0	0	0	0	—	—	—	—	—
1993–94	Hartford Whalers	NHL	33	6	5	11	39	—	—	—	—	—
1993–94	Springfield Indians	AHL	30	16	8	24	39	4	0	2	2	4
1994–95	Springfield Falcons	AHL	74	30	52	82	121	—	—	—	—	—
1994–95	Hartford Whalers	NHL	2	0	0	0	0	—	—	—	—	—
1995–96	Springfield Falcons	AHL	9	4	8	12	18	—	—	—	—	—
1995–96	Detroit Vipers	IHL	12	5	3	8	16	—	—	—	—	—
1995–96	Dallas Stars	NHL	5	1	1	2	0	—	—	—	—	—
1995–96	Michigan K–Wings	IHL	50	23	23	46	63	7	3	1	4	16
1996–97	Worcester IceCats	AHL	12	5	4	9	19	—	—	—	—	—
1996–97	St. Louis Blues	NHL	44	7	12	19	10	2	0	0	0	0
1997–98	Worcester IceCats	AHL	65	27	34	61	97	10	3	4	7	12
1998–99	Tampa Bay Lightning	NHL	28	3	4	7	6	—	—	—	—	—
1998–99	Grand Rapids Griffins	IHL	49	26	32	58	87	—	—	—	—	—
1999–2000	Grand Rapids Griffins	IHL	7	5	3	8	4	—	—	—	—	—
1999–2000	Tampa Bay Lightning	NHL	43	7	10	17	14	—	—	—	—	—
2000–01	Chicago Wolves	IHL	23	13	10	23	22	—	—	—	—	—
2000–01	New York Islanders	NHL	11	0	0	0	4	—	—	—	—	—
2000–01	Modo Hockey	SEL	7	3	2	5	10	7	1	1	2	6
2001–02	HC Ambrì–Piotta	NLA	38	23	23	46	34	6	2	2	4	22
2002–03	HC Ambrì–Piotta	NLA	42	15	20	35	40	4	1	2	3	4
2003–04	SC Langnau	NLA	24	7	12	19	12	—	—	—	—	—
2004–05	ZSC Lions	NLA	44	21	29	50	48	15	6	9	15	39
2005–06	ZSC Lions	NLA	19	5	8	13	14	—	—	—	—	—
2006–07	ZSC Lions	NLA	39	14	17	31	50	7	3	2	5	2
2007–08	HC Vítkovice Steel	ELH	11	5	4	9	8	—	—	—	—	—
2007–08	Leksands IF	SWE.2	33	10	17	27	36	10	5	4	9	10
2008–09	HC Vítkovice Steel	ELH	37	5	15	20	47	—	—	—	—	—
2008–09	Leksands IF	SWE.2	6	1	3	4	10	10	0	0	0	4
2009–10	Dukla Trenčín	SVK	4	0	4	4	2	—	—	—	—	—
2009–10	Dinamo Riga	KHL	34	8	12	20	43	9	0	2	2	10
2010–11	KalPa	SM-l	13	2	5	7	4	—	—	—	—	—
2010–11	Dinamo Riga	KHL	20	1	2	3	8	11	1	2	3	6
2011–12	HC Kometa Brno	ELH	43	8	18	26	22	15	4	3	7	6
2012–13	HC Kometa Brno	ELH	48	9	7	16	20	—	—	—	—	—
2013–14	HK Dukla Trenčín	SVK	33	6	14	20	8	—	—	—	—	—
2013–14	HC Slavia Praha	ELH	5	0	1	1	2	—	—	—	—	—
2014–15	HK Dukla Trenčín	SVK	37	6	17	23	18	—	—	—	—	—
2015–16	HK Dukla Trenčín	SVK	43	1	19	20	18	—	—	—	—	—
NHL totals			208	27	38	65	118	2	0	0	0	0
AHL totals			206	87	109	196	333	29	8	12	20	30
NLA totals			206	85	109	194	198	32	12	15	27	67

=== International ===
Year	Team	Event	GP	G	A	Pts	PIM
1991	Czechoslovakia	EJC	4	1	7	8	4
1992	Czechoslovakia	WJC	7	3	6	9	10
1994	Slovakia	OG	8	1	6	7	18
1995	Slovakia	WC B	6	4	7	11	8
1996	Slovakia	WC	3	0	1	1	0
1998	Slovakia	OG	4	2	1	3	0
2001	Slovakia	WC	7	4	2	6	0
2002	Slovakia	OG	4	1	1	2	2
2002	Slovakia	WC	9	1	1	2	4
2008	Slovakia	WC	5	4	2	6	2
Junior totals			11	4	13	17	14
Senior totals			40	13	14	27	26

Preceded by Patrick Poulin	Hartford Whalers first-round draft pick 1992	Succeeded by Chris Pronger
