= Walter Marx =

Slovak luger

Walter Marx (born 17 May 1978 in Poprad) is a Slovak luger who competed from 1993 to 2006. Competing in two Winter Olympics, he earned his best finish of ninth in the men's doubles event at Salt Lake City in 2002.

Marx carried the Slovak flag at the 2006 Winter Olympics opening ceremony and unofficially carried the flag of Czechoslovakia on his arm.

Marx's best finish at the FIL World Luge Championships was seventh in the men's doubles event at Park City, Utah in 2005. He served as a technical delegate to the FIL World Luge Championships 2009 in Lake Placid, New York.

== Sources ==
- 2002 luge men's doubles results
- 2006 luge men's doubles results
- Eurosport.com report of all flag bearers for the opening ceremony of the 2006 Winter Olympics, including Marx
- FIL-Luge profile
- List of jury and technical delegates for the FIL World Luge Championships 2009 in Lake Placid, including Marx. - accessed 2 February 2009.
- SSSR profile of the luge team, including Marx (in Slovak)
