= Anna Murínová =

Slovak biathlete (born 1973)

Personal information
- Nationality: Slovak
- Born: 14 November 1973 (age 52) Brezno, Czechoslovakia (present-day Slovakia)
- Height: 165 cm (5 ft 5 in)
- Weight: 52 kg (115 lb)

Sport
Medal record
Biathlon
Representing Slovakia
Winter Universiade
Gold medal – first place	1999 Poprad-Tatry	3x 7.5 km relay
Bronze medal – third place	1999 Poprad-Tatry	10 km pursuit

Anna Murínová (born 14 November 1973) is a Slovak biathlete. She competed at the 1998, 2002 and the 2006 Winter Olympics.
