= Ice hockey at the 1994 Winter Olympics – Rosters =

The ice hockey team rosters at the 1994 Winter Olympics consisted of the following players:

== Austria ==
Head coach: (Canada) Ken Tyler

No.	Pos.	Name	Height	Weight	Birthdate	Team
6	D	Jim Burton	6 ft 0 in (183 cm)	190 lb (86 kg)	November 6, 1963 (aged 30)	(Austria) Klagenfurter AC
11	F	Marty Dallman	5 ft 10 in (178 cm)	181 lb (82 kg)	February 15, 1963 (aged 30)	(Austria) EC Graz
31	G	Claus Dalpiaz	5 ft 9 in (175 cm)	154 lb (70 kg)	October 10, 1971 (aged 22)	(Austria) VEU Feldkirch
29	D	Rob Doyle	6 ft 0 in (183 cm)	194 lb (88 kg)	February 10, 1964 (aged 30)	(Austria) EC Graz
32	D	Michael Güntner	6 ft 7 in (201 cm)	254 lb (115 kg)	January 3, 1968 (aged 26)	(Austria) EC Graz
5	D	Karl Heinzle	6 ft 4 in (193 cm)	214 lb (97 kg)	August 30, 1960 (aged 33)	(Austria) VEU Feldkirch
30	D	Herbert Hohenberger	6 ft 0 in (183 cm)	194 lb (88 kg)	February 8, 1969 (aged 25)	(Austria) Villacher SV
74	F	Dieter Kalt	5 ft 9 in (175 cm)	183 lb (83 kg)	June 26, 1974 (aged 19)	(Austria) Klagenfurter AC
26	F	Werner Kerth	5 ft 9 in (175 cm)	185 lb (84 kg)	December 7, 1966 (aged 27)	(Austria) EC Graz
4	D	Martin Krainz	6 ft 1 in (185 cm)	185 lb (84 kg)	May 25, 1967 (aged 26)	(Austria) Klagenfurter AC
27	F/D	Wolfgang Kromp	5 ft 9 in (175 cm)	187 lb (85 kg)	September 17, 1970 (aged 23)	(Austria) Villacher SV
17	F	Günther Lanzinger	6 ft 2 in (188 cm)	194 lb (88 kg)	January 4, 1972 (aged 22)	(Austria) Villacher SV
14	D	Engelbert Linder	6 ft 3 in (191 cm)	214 lb (97 kg)	July 18, 1962 (aged 31)	(Austria) Villacher SV
13	F	Manfred Mühr (C)	5 ft 9 in (175 cm)	176 lb (80 kg)	May 31, 1967 (aged 26)	(Austria) Villacher SV
16	F	Rick Nasheim	5 ft 11 in (180 cm)	187 lb (85 kg)	January 15, 1963 (aged 31)	(Austria) VEU Feldkirch
23	G	Michael Puschacher	6 ft 2 in (188 cm)	185 lb (84 kg)	September 15, 1968 (aged 25)	(Austria) Klagenfurter AC
12	F	Gerhard Pusnik	5 ft 9 in (175 cm)	185 lb (84 kg)	October 16, 1966 (aged 27)	(Austria) VEU Feldkirch
7	F	Andreas Pusnik	5 ft 10 in (178 cm)	190 lb (86 kg)	September 7, 1972 (aged 21)	(Austria) Klagenfurter AC
18	F	Gerald Ressmann	6 ft 4 in (193 cm)	225 lb (102 kg)	July 24, 1970 (aged 23)	(Austria) Villacher SV
24	D	Michael Shea	5 ft 11 in (180 cm)	196 lb (89 kg)	June 4, 1961 (aged 32)	(Austria) VEU Feldkirch
25	G	Brian Stankiewicz	5 ft 11 in (180 cm)	176 lb (80 kg)	June 20, 1956 (aged 37)	(Austria) EC Graz
22	F	Ken Strong	5 ft 11 in (180 cm)	183 lb (83 kg)	May 9, 1963 (aged 30)	(Austria) Villacher SV
47	D	Martin Ulrich	6 ft 2 in (188 cm)	209 lb (95 kg)	December 16, 1969 (aged 24)	(Austria) EC Graz

== Canada ==
Head coach: Tom Renney

Assistant coach: Danny Dubé

No.	Pos.	Name	Height	Weight	Birthdate	Team
1	G	Corey Hirsch	5 ft 11 in (180 cm)	181 lb (82 kg)	July 1, 1972 (aged 21)	(United States) Binghamton Rangers
3	D	Adrian Aucoin	6 ft 2 in (188 cm)	216 lb (98 kg)	July 3, 1973 (aged 20)	-
4	D	Derek Mayer (A)	6 ft 0 in (183 cm)	201 lb (91 kg)	May 21, 1967 (aged 26)	-
5	D	Brad Werenka	6 ft 1 in (185 cm)	220 lb (100 kg)	February 12, 1969 (aged 25)	(Canada) Edmonton Oilers
6	D	Ken Lovsin	6 ft 0 in (183 cm)	194 lb (88 kg)	December 3, 1966 (aged 27)	-
7	F	Todd Hlushko	5 ft 11 in (180 cm)	185 lb (84 kg)	February 7, 1970 (aged 24)	-
8	F	Fabian Joseph (C)	5 ft 9 in (175 cm)	165 lb (75 kg)	December 5, 1965 (aged 28)	-
9	F	Paul Kariya	5 ft 10 in (178 cm)	181 lb (82 kg)	October 16, 1974 (aged 19)	(United States) Maine Black Bears
10	F	Dwayne Norris	5 ft 10 in (178 cm)	176 lb (80 kg)	January 8, 1970 (aged 24)	(Canada) Cornwall Aces
12	F	Greg Johnson	5 ft 10 in (178 cm)	196 lb (89 kg)	March 16, 1971 (aged 22)	(United States) Detroit Red Wings
14	F	Brian Savage	6 ft 2 in (188 cm)	198 lb (90 kg)	February 24, 1971 (aged 22)	(Canada) Fredericton Canadiens
16	F	Wally Schreiber	5 ft 10 in (178 cm)	176 lb (80 kg)	April 15, 1962 (aged 31)	(Germany) Hedos München
18	F	Todd Warriner	6 ft 1 in (185 cm)	201 lb (91 kg)	January 3, 1974 (aged 20)	(Canada) Kitchener Rangers
22	F	Greg Parks	5 ft 10 in (178 cm)	181 lb (82 kg)	March 25, 1967 (aged 26)	(Sweden) Leksands IF
24	D	Mark Astley	6 ft 1 in (185 cm)	198 lb (90 kg)	March 30, 1969 (aged 24)	(Switzerland) HC Ambrì-Piotta
25	F	Jean-Yves Roy	5 ft 10 in (178 cm)	181 lb (82 kg)	February 17, 1969 (aged 24)	(United States) Binghamton Rangers
27	F	Chris Kontos	6 ft 1 in (185 cm)	194 lb (88 kg)	October 12, 1963 (aged 30)	-
28	D	David Harlock	6 ft 2 in (188 cm)	194 lb (88 kg)	March 16, 1971 (aged 22)	(United States) Michigan Wolverines
30	G	Manny Legace	5 ft 10 in (178 cm)	198 lb (90 kg)	February 4, 1973 (aged 21)	(Canada) Niagara Falls Thunder
33	D	Chris Therien	6 ft 5 in (196 cm)	236 lb (107 kg)	December 14, 1971 (aged 22)	(United States) Providence Friars
28	D	Brad Schlegel (A)	5 ft 11 in (180 cm)	190 lb (86 kg)	July 22, 1968 (aged 25)	(Canada) Saint John Flames
93	F	Petr Nedvěd	6 ft 4 in (193 cm)	205 lb (93 kg)	December 9, 1971 (aged 22)	-

== Czech Republic ==
Head coach: Ivan Hlinka

Assistant coach: Stanislav Neveselý

No.	Pos.	Name	Height	Weight	Birthdate	Team
1	G	Petr Bříza	6 ft 0 in (183 cm)	181 lb (82 kg)	December 9, 1964 (aged 29)	(Germany) EV Landshut
2	G	Roman Turek	6 ft 4 in (193 cm)	220 lb (100 kg)	May 21, 1970 (aged 23)	(Czech Republic) HC České Budějovice
4	D	Jiří Vykoukal	5 ft 11 in (180 cm)	187 lb (85 kg)	March 11, 1971 (aged 22)	(Czech Republic) HC Sparta Praha
5	D	Drahomír Kadlec	5 ft 11 in (180 cm)	190 lb (86 kg)	November 29, 1965 (aged 28)	(Germany) ESV Kaufbeuren
6	D	Bedřich Ščerban	5 ft 8 in (173 cm)	176 lb (80 kg)	May 31, 1964 (aged 29)	(Sweden) Brynäs IF
7	D	Antonín Stavjaňa (A)	6 ft 0 in (183 cm)	198 lb (90 kg)	February 10, 1963 (aged 31)	(Sweden) HV71
8	D	Miloslav Hořava	5 ft 11 in (180 cm)	192 lb (87 kg)	August 14, 1961 (aged 32)	(Sweden) MoDo Hockey
10	D	Jiří Veber	6 ft 1 in (185 cm)	203 lb (92 kg)	November 29, 1968 (aged 25)	(Czech Republic) HC Kladno
12	F	Kamil Kašťák	5 ft 10 in (178 cm)	172 lb (78 kg)	May 8, 1966 (aged 27)	(Finland) Lukko
13	F	Richard Žemlička	6 ft 1 in (185 cm)	201 lb (91 kg)	April 13, 1964 (aged 29)	(Germany) Eisbären Berlin
14	F	Roman Horák	6 ft 0 in (183 cm)	207 lb (94 kg)	September 24, 1969 (aged 24)	(Czech Republic) HC České Budějovice
16	F	Jan Alinč	6 ft 2 in (188 cm)	196 lb (89 kg)	May 27, 1972 (aged 21)	(Czech Republic) HC Litvínov
17	F	Tomáš Sršeň	6 ft 0 in (183 cm)	198 lb (90 kg)	August 25, 1966 (aged 27)	(Sweden) Rögle BK
18	F	Petr Hrbek	5 ft 11 in (180 cm)	194 lb (88 kg)	April 3, 1969 (aged 24)	(Czechoslovakia) HC Sparta Praha
19	F	Tomáš Kapusta	6 ft 0 in (183 cm)	190 lb (86 kg)	February 23, 1967 (aged 26)	(Finland) HPK
20	F	Otakar Janecký (C)	5 ft 10 in (178 cm)	183 lb (83 kg)	December 26, 1960 (aged 33)	(Finland) Jokerit
21	F	Jiří Kučera	6 ft 0 in (183 cm)	181 lb (82 kg)	March 28, 1966 (aged 27)	(Finland) Tappara
22	F	Martin Hosták	6 ft 3 in (191 cm)	209 lb (95 kg)	November 11, 1967 (aged 26)	(Sweden) MoDo Hockey
25	F	Pavel Geffert	6 ft 2 in (188 cm)	192 lb (87 kg)	May 7, 1968 (aged 25)	(Czechoslovakia) HC Sparta Praha
26	F	Jiří Doležal (A)	5 ft 9 in (175 cm)	185 lb (84 kg)	September 22, 1963 (aged 30)	(Germany) EHC 80 Nürnberg
27	F	Radek Ťoupal	5 ft 11 in (180 cm)	194 lb (88 kg)	August 16, 1966 (aged 27)	(Czech Republic) HC České Budějovice
28	D	Jan Vopat	5 ft 11 in (180 cm)	207 lb (94 kg)	March 22, 1973 (aged 20)	(Czech Republic) HC Litvínov
29	G	Jaroslav Kameš	5 ft 11 in (180 cm)	179 lb (81 kg)	August 14, 1969 (aged 24)	(Czech Republic) HC Kladno

== Finland ==
Head coach: (Sweden) Curt Lindström

Assistant coach: Hannu Aravirta

No.	Pos.	Name	Height	Weight	Birthdate	Team
1	G	Pasi Kuivalainen	5 ft 11 in (180 cm)	172 lb (78 kg)	July 15, 1972 (aged 21)	(Finland) KalPa
2	D	Marko Kiprusoff	6 ft 0 in (183 cm)	209 lb (95 kg)	February 6, 1972 (aged 22)	(Finland) TPS
4	D	Erik Hämäläinen	6 ft 2 in (188 cm)	198 lb (90 kg)	April 20, 1965 (aged 28)	(Finland) Jokerit
5	D	Timo Jutila (C)	5 ft 10 in (178 cm)	187 lb (85 kg)	December 24, 1963 (aged 30)	(Finland) Tappara
6	D	Pasi Sormunen	6 ft 1 in (185 cm)	209 lb (95 kg)	March 8, 1970 (aged 23)	(Finland) HIFK
8	F	Janne Ojanen	6 ft 2 in (188 cm)	203 lb (92 kg)	April 9, 1968 (aged 25)	(Finland) Tappara
9	F	Esa Keskinen	5 ft 10 in (178 cm)	194 lb (88 kg)	February 3, 1965 (aged 29)	(Finland) TPS
11	F	Saku Koivu	5 ft 10 in (178 cm)	181 lb (82 kg)	November 23, 1974 (aged 19)	(Finland) TPS
12	D	Janne Laukkanen (A)	6 ft 0 in (183 cm)	187 lb (85 kg)	March 19, 1970 (aged 23)	(Finland) HPK
13	F	Marko Palo	5 ft 11 in (180 cm)	198 lb (90 kg)	September 26, 1967 (aged 26)	(Finland) HPK
14	F	Raimo Helminen	6 ft 0 in (183 cm)	194 lb (88 kg)	March 11, 1964 (aged 29)	(Sweden) Malmö IF
15	F	Mika Alatalo	6 ft 0 in (183 cm)	203 lb (92 kg)	June 11, 1971 (aged 22)	(Finland) Lukko
16	F	Ville Peltonen (A)	5 ft 11 in (180 cm)	187 lb (85 kg)	May 24, 1973 (aged 20)	(Finland) HIFK
20	F	Jere Lehtinen	6 ft 0 in (183 cm)	194 lb (88 kg)	June 24, 1973 (aged 20)	(Finland) TPS
23	D	Hannu Virta	5 ft 11 in (180 cm)	181 lb (82 kg)	March 22, 1963 (aged 30)	(Finland) TPS
24	F	Sami Kapanen	5 ft 10 in (178 cm)	181 lb (82 kg)	June 14, 1973 (aged 20)	(Finland) KalPa
26	D	Mika Strömberg	6 ft 0 in (183 cm)	194 lb (88 kg)	February 28, 1970 (aged 23)	(Finland) Jokerit
27	F	Tero Lehterä	6 ft 0 in (183 cm)	192 lb (87 kg)	April 21, 1972 (aged 21)	(Finland) Kiekko-Espoo
28	F	Petri Varis	6 ft 1 in (185 cm)	209 lb (95 kg)	May 13, 1969 (aged 24)	(Finland) Jokerit
30	G	Jukka Tammi	5 ft 11 in (180 cm)	172 lb (78 kg)	April 10, 1962 (aged 31)	(Finland) Ilves
35	G	Jarmo Myllys	5 ft 9 in (175 cm)	172 lb (78 kg)	May 29, 1965 (aged 28)	(Finland) Lukko
40	F	Mika Nieminen	6 ft 1 in (185 cm)	203 lb (92 kg)	January 1, 1966 (aged 28)	(Sweden) Luleå HF
42	F	Mikko Mäkelä	6 ft 2 in (188 cm)	194 lb (88 kg)	February 26, 1965 (aged 28)	(Sweden) Malmö IF

== France ==
Head coach: (Sweden) Kjell Larsson

No.	Pos.	Name	Height	Weight	Birthdate	Team
1	G	Michel Vallière	6 ft 4 in (193 cm)	203 lb (92 kg)	March 20, 1962 (aged 31)	(France) Angers
3	D	Christophe Moyon	5 ft 9 in (175 cm)	194 lb (88 kg)	May 12, 1963 (aged 30)	(France) Amiens
4	F	Franck Saunier	5 ft 9 in (175 cm)	159 lb (72 kg)	April 14, 1966 (aged 27)	(France) Rouen
5	D	Steven Woodburn	6 ft 1 in (185 cm)	198 lb (90 kg)	October 24, 1963 (aged 30)	(France) Rouen
7	F/D	Stéphane Barin	5 ft 10 in (178 cm)	172 lb (78 kg)	January 8, 1971 (aged 23)	(France) Chamonix
8	F	Arnaud Briand	6 ft 1 in (185 cm)	198 lb (90 kg)	April 29, 1970 (aged 23)	(France) Reims
10	F	Pierre Pousse	5 ft 11 in (180 cm)	176 lb (80 kg)	February 27, 1966 (aged 27)	(France) Amiens
12	F	Sylvain Girard	5 ft 10 in (178 cm)	181 lb (82 kg)	May 19, 1972 (aged 21)	(France) Grenoble
14	F	Benoit Laporte	5 ft 11 in (180 cm)	176 lb (80 kg)	June 14, 1960 (aged 33)	(France) Rouen
15	F	Benjamin Agnel	5 ft 9 in (175 cm)	165 lb (75 kg)	November 29, 1973 (aged 20)	(France) Grenoble
17	F	Pierrick Maïa	6 ft 0 in (183 cm)	181 lb (82 kg)	February 16, 1967 (aged 26)	(France) Rouen
18	F	Eric LeMarque	5 ft 9 in (175 cm)	172 lb (78 kg)	July 1, 1969 (aged 24)	(France) Rouen
19	D	Stéphane Botteri	5 ft 9 in (175 cm)	161 lb (73 kg)	January 27, 1962 (aged 32)	(France) Morzine-Avoriaz
21	F	Christophe Ville	5 ft 11 in (180 cm)	176 lb (80 kg)	June 15, 1963 (aged 30)	(Italy) Devils Milano
22	D	Bruno Saunier	5 ft 10 in (178 cm)	176 lb (80 kg)	July 19, 1962 (aged 31)	(France) Gap
23	D	Gérald Guennelon	6 ft 2 in (188 cm)	187 lb (85 kg)	June 22, 1967 (aged 26)	(France) Amiens
24	D	Denis Perez	6 ft 2 in (188 cm)	203 lb (92 kg)	April 25, 1964 (aged 29)	(France) Rouen
25	F	Antoine Richer (C)	6 ft 2 in (188 cm)	196 lb (89 kg)	August 9, 1961 (aged 32)	(France) Amiens
26	F	Stéphane Arcangeloni	5 ft 9 in (175 cm)	176 lb (80 kg)	June 6, 1972 (aged 21)	(France) Grenoble
27	D	Serge Poudrier	5 ft 11 in (180 cm)	183 lb (83 kg)	April 22, 1966 (aged 27)	(France) Rouen
29	G	Petri Ylönen	6 ft 3 in (191 cm)	201 lb (91 kg)	October 2, 1962 (aged 31)	(France) Rouen
30	G	Fabrice Lhenry	5 ft 11 in (180 cm)	181 lb (82 kg)	June 29, 1972 (aged 21)	(France) Chamonix
32	F	Franck Pajonkowski	6 ft 5 in (196 cm)	227 lb (103 kg)	January 21, 1964 (aged 30)	(France) Rouen

== Germany ==
Head coach: (Czechoslovakia) Luděk Bukač

Assistant coach: Franz Reindl

No.	Pos.	Name	Height	Weight	Birthdate	Team
20	D	Rick Amann	6 ft 0 in (183 cm)	190 lb (86 kg)	December 30, 1960 (aged 33)	(Germany) Düsseldorfer EG
32	F/D	Jan Benda	6 ft 2 in (188 cm)	218 lb (99 kg)	April 28, 1972 (aged 21)	(Germany) Hedos München
7	F	Thomas Brandl	5 ft 9 in (175 cm)	165 lb (75 kg)	February 9, 1969 (aged 25)	(Germany) Kölner EC
1	G	Helmut de Raaf	6 ft 1 in (185 cm)	176 lb (80 kg)	November 5, 1961 (aged 32)	(Germany) Düsseldorfer EG
16	F	Benoit Doucet	5 ft 9 in (175 cm)	183 lb (83 kg)	April 23, 1963 (aged 30)	(Germany) Düsseldorfer EG
22	F	Georg Franz	5 ft 9 in (175 cm)	172 lb (78 kg)	January 9, 1965 (aged 29)	(Germany) Hedos München
33	F	Jörg Handrick	5 ft 11 in (180 cm)	209 lb (95 kg)	July 20, 1968 (aged 25)	(Germany) EV Landshut
23	F	Dieter Hegen	6 ft 0 in (183 cm)	198 lb (90 kg)	April 29, 1962 (aged 31)	(Germany) Hedos München
30	G	Josef Heiß	5 ft 11 in (180 cm)	187 lb (85 kg)	June 13, 1963 (aged 30)	(Germany) Kölner EC
25	D	Uli Hiemer (C)	6 ft 1 in (185 cm)	190 lb (86 kg)	September 21, 1962 (aged 31)	(Germany) Düsseldorfer EG
15	F	Raimund Hilger	6 ft 0 in (183 cm)	190 lb (86 kg)	December 3, 1965 (aged 28)	(Germany) Hedos München
3	D	Torsten Kienass	6 ft 0 in (183 cm)	201 lb (91 kg)	February 23, 1971 (aged 22)	(Germany) Düsseldorfer EG
21	F	Wolfgang Kummer	6 ft 2 in (188 cm)	198 lb (90 kg)	March 29, 1970 (aged 23)	(Germany) Düsseldorfer EG
2	D	Mirko Lüdemann	5 ft 11 in (180 cm)	192 lb (87 kg)	December 15, 1973 (aged 20)	(Germany) Kölner EC
6	D	Jörg Mayr	5 ft 10 in (178 cm)	168 lb (76 kg)	January 4, 1970 (aged 24)	(Germany) Kölner EC
27	G	Klaus Merk	5 ft 11 in (180 cm)	185 lb (84 kg)	April 26, 1967 (aged 26)	(Germany) Berliner SC Preussen
35	D	Jayson Meyer	5 ft 11 in (180 cm)	187 lb (85 kg)	February 12, 1965 (aged 29)	(Germany) Krefelder EV 1981
19	D	Andreas Niederberger	5 ft 10 in (178 cm)	181 lb (82 kg)	April 20, 1963 (aged 30)	(Germany) Düsseldorfer EG
26	F	Michael Rumrich	5 ft 10 in (178 cm)	170 lb (77 kg)	July 1, 1965 (aged 28)	(Germany) Berliner SC Preussen
12	F	Alexander Serikow	6 ft 0 in (183 cm)	181 lb (82 kg)	June 23, 1975 (aged 18)	(Germany) Mannheimer ERC
13	F	Leo Stefan	6 ft 0 in (183 cm)	181 lb (82 kg)	February 22, 1970 (aged 23)	(Germany) Kölner EC
14	F	Bernd Truntschka	5 ft 11 in (180 cm)	176 lb (80 kg)	August 7, 1965 (aged 28)	(Germany) Düsseldorfer EG
24	F	Stefan Ustorf	5 ft 11 in (180 cm)	194 lb (88 kg)	January 3, 1974 (aged 20)	(Germany) ESV Kaufbeuren

== Italy ==
Head coach: (Canada) Bryan Lefley

Assistant coach: (Canada) Dale McCourt

No.	Pos.	Name	Height	Weight	Birthdate	Team
3	D	Phil DeGaetano	6 ft 1 in (185 cm)	194 lb (88 kg)	August 9, 1963 (aged 30)	(Italy) Milano
4	D	Robert Oberrauch (C)	6 ft 2 in (188 cm)	207 lb (94 kg)	November 6, 1965 (aged 28)	(Italy) HC Bolzano
5	D	Leo Insam	6 ft 5 in (196 cm)	212 lb (96 kg)	February 6, 1975 (aged 19)	(Italy) Gherdëina
6	F/D	Jim Camazzola	6 ft 0 in (183 cm)	203 lb (92 kg)	January 5, 1964 (aged 30)	(Italy) Courmaosta
7	D	Bill Stewart	6 ft 1 in (185 cm)	179 lb (81 kg)	October 6, 1957 (aged 36)	(Italy) Gherdëina
9	F	Emilio Iovio	6 ft 0 in (183 cm)	185 lb (84 kg)	March 9, 1962 (aged 31)	(Italy) Devils Milano
10	F	Lino De Toni	5 ft 10 in (178 cm)	161 lb (73 kg)	October 18, 1972 (aged 21)	(Italy) Alleghe
11	F	Roland Ramoser	6 ft 3 in (191 cm)	205 lb (93 kg)	September 3, 1972 (aged 21)	(Italy) Devils Milano
12	F	Maurizio Mansi	5 ft 10 in (178 cm)	185 lb (84 kg)	September 3, 1965 (aged 28)	(Italy) Varese
16	F	Bruno Zarrillo	5 ft 11 in (180 cm)	170 lb (77 kg)	September 5, 1966 (aged 27)	(Italy) HC Bolzano
17	F	Gaetano Orlando	5 ft 10 in (178 cm)	183 lb (83 kg)	November 13, 1962 (aged 31)	(Italy) Devils Milano
18	F	Alexander Gschliesser	5 ft 11 in (180 cm)	185 lb (84 kg)	May 11, 1973 (aged 20)	(Italy) Fassa
19	F	Patrick Brugnoli	5 ft 9 in (175 cm)	176 lb (80 kg)	April 12, 1970 (aged 23)	(Italy) Gherdëina
25	D	Anthony Circelli	6 ft 0 in (183 cm)	183 lb (83 kg)	November 18, 1961 (aged 32)	(Italy) Devils Milano
27	F	Lucio Topatigh	6 ft 1 in (185 cm)	203 lb (92 kg)	October 19, 1965 (aged 28)	(Italy) Devils Milano
28	F	Martin Pavlu	6 ft 2 in (188 cm)	187 lb (85 kg)	July 8, 1962 (aged 31)	(Italy) HC Bolzano
30	G	Bruno Campese	5 ft 10 in (178 cm)	181 lb (82 kg)	August 3, 1963 (aged 30)	(Italy) Devils Milano
32	F	Vezio Sacratini	5 ft 8 in (173 cm)	172 lb (78 kg)	September 12, 1966 (aged 27)	(Italy) Varese
33	G	David Delfino	5 ft 8 in (173 cm)	174 lb (79 kg)	December 29, 1965 (aged 28)	(Italy) Alleghe
34	G	Mike Rosati	5 ft 9 in (175 cm)	172 lb (78 kg)	January 7, 1968 (aged 26)	(Italy) HC Bolzano
37	D	Mike DeAngelis	5 ft 11 in (180 cm)	190 lb (86 kg)	January 27, 1966 (aged 28)	(Italy) Devils Milano
41	D	Luigi Da Corte	5 ft 10 in (178 cm)	176 lb (80 kg)	June 10, 1973 (aged 20)	(Italy) Varese
91	F	Stefan Figliuzzi	5 ft 11 in (180 cm)	176 lb (80 kg)	July 23, 1968 (aged 25)	(Italy) Varese

== Norway ==
Head coach: (Sweden) Bengt Ohlson

No.	Pos.	Name	Height	Weight	Birthdate	Team
35	G	Steve Allman	6 ft 0 in (183 cm)	183 lb (83 kg)	May 16, 1968 (aged 25)	(Norway) Manglerud
24	D	Cato Tom Andersen	5 ft 11 in (180 cm)	190 lb (86 kg)	June 17, 1967 (aged 26)	(Norway) Vålerenga
13	D	Lars Håkon Andersen	5 ft 11 in (180 cm)	209 lb (95 kg)	January 13, 1974 (aged 20)	(Norway) Stjernen
4	D	Morgan Andersen	5 ft 10 in (178 cm)	176 lb (80 kg)	April 7, 1966 (aged 27)	(Norway) Lillehammer
11	F	Vegar Barlie	6 ft 1 in (185 cm)	174 lb (79 kg)	August 7, 1972 (aged 21)	(Norway) Lillehammer
19	F	Arne Billkvam	5 ft 10 in (178 cm)	201 lb (91 kg)	April 7, 1960 (aged 33)	(Norway) Sparta Sarpsborg
17	D	Svenn Erik Bjørnstad	6 ft 1 in (185 cm)	203 lb (92 kg)	January 4, 1971 (aged 23)	(Norway) Vålerenga
18	F	Ole Eskild Dahlstrøm	6 ft 1 in (185 cm)	209 lb (95 kg)	March 4, 1970 (aged 23)	(Norway) Storhamar
12	D	Jan-Roar Fagerli	6 ft 2 in (188 cm)	192 lb (87 kg)	September 22, 1966 (aged 27)	(Norway) Manglerud
23	F	Morten Finstad	5 ft 11 in (180 cm)	187 lb (85 kg)	May 24, 1967 (aged 26)	(Norway) Stjernen Hockey
10	F	Geir Hoff	6 ft 0 in (183 cm)	181 lb (82 kg)	February 14, 1965 (aged 28)	(Norway) Lillehammer
7	D	Tommy Jakobsen	5 ft 8 in (173 cm)	187 lb (85 kg)	December 10, 1970 (aged 23)	(Norway) Lillehammer
28	F	Roy Johansen	5 ft 11 in (180 cm)	185 lb (84 kg)	April 27, 1960 (aged 33)	(Norway) Vålerenga
29	F	Tom Johansen	5 ft 10 in (178 cm)	181 lb (82 kg)	July 19, 1967 (aged 26)	(Norway) Vålerenga
41	F	Espen Knutsen	5 ft 11 in (180 cm)	194 lb (88 kg)	January 12, 1972 (aged 22)	(Norway) Vålerenga
20	F	Erik Kristiansen	6 ft 0 in (183 cm)	192 lb (87 kg)	March 12, 1961 (aged 32)	(Norway) Storhamar
21	F	Trond Magnussen	5 ft 9 in (175 cm)	187 lb (85 kg)	February 1, 1973 (aged 21)	(Norway) Stjernen Hockey
30	G	Jim Marthinsen	6 ft 2 in (188 cm)	196 lb (89 kg)	April 15, 1956 (aged 37)	(Norway) Vålerenga
15	D	Svein Enok Nørstebø	5 ft 11 in (180 cm)	187 lb (85 kg)	February 27, 1972 (aged 21)	(Norway) Lillehammer
37	F	Marius Rath	6 ft 2 in (188 cm)	187 lb (85 kg)	May 27, 1970 (aged 23)	(Norway) Vålerenga
3	D	Petter Salsten	6 ft 3 in (191 cm)	207 lb (94 kg)	March 11, 1965 (aged 28)	(Norway) Storhamar
1	G	Rob Schistad	5 ft 11 in (180 cm)	187 lb (85 kg)	October 28, 1966 (aged 27)	(Norway) Viking
22	F	Petter Thoresen	6 ft 0 in (183 cm)	187 lb (85 kg)	July 25, 1961 (aged 32)	(Norway) Storhamar

== Russia ==
Head coach: Viktor Tikhonov

Assistant coach: Igor Dmitriev

No.	Pos.	Name	Height	Weight	Birthdate	Team
1	G	Andrei Zuev	5 ft 10 in (178 cm)	185 lb (84 kg)	May 18, 1964 (aged 29)	(Russia) Traktor Chelyabinsk
2	D	Oleg Davydov	5 ft 10 in (178 cm)	179 lb (81 kg)	March 16, 1971 (aged 22)	(Russia) Traktor Chelyabinsk
3	D	Sergei Tertyshny	6 ft 5 in (196 cm)	225 lb (102 kg)	June 3, 1970 (aged 23)	(Russia) Traktor Chelyabinsk
4	D	Sergei Sorokin	5 ft 11 in (180 cm)	190 lb (86 kg)	October 2, 1969 (aged 24)	(Russia) Dynamo Moskva
5	D	Alexander Smirnov (C)	6 ft 0 in (183 cm)	183 lb (83 kg)	August 17, 1964 (aged 29)	(Finland) TPS
6	D	Vladimir Tarasov	6 ft 1 in (185 cm)	198 lb (90 kg)	March 21, 1968 (aged 25)	(Russia) Lada Togliatti
9	F	Alexei Kudashov	6 ft 0 in (183 cm)	190 lb (86 kg)	July 21, 1971 (aged 22)	(Russia) Krylya Sovetov Moskva
10	D	Igor Ivanov	5 ft 10 in (178 cm)	181 lb (82 kg)	October 26, 1970 (aged 23)	(Russia) Krylya Sovetov Moskva
11	F	Georgy Yevtyukhin	6 ft 0 in (183 cm)	192 lb (87 kg)	May 9, 1970 (aged 23)	(Russia) Spartak Moskva
12	F	Sergei Berezin	5 ft 10 in (178 cm)	196 lb (89 kg)	November 5, 1971 (aged 22)	(Russia) Khimik Voskresensk
14	F	Valeri Karpov	5 ft 10 in (178 cm)	203 lb (92 kg)	August 5, 1971 (aged 22)	(Russia) Traktor Chelyabinsk
18	F	Igor Varitsky	5 ft 9 in (175 cm)	183 lb (83 kg)	April 25, 1971 (aged 22)	(Russia) Traktor Chelyabinsk
19	F	Alexander Vinogradov	5 ft 9 in (175 cm)	187 lb (85 kg)	June 20, 1970 (aged 23)	(Russia) SKA St. Petersburg
20	G	Valeri Ivannikov	5 ft 9 in (175 cm)	187 lb (85 kg)	January 28, 1967 (aged 27)	(Russia) SKA St. Petersburg
21	F	Dmitri Denisov	5 ft 10 in (178 cm)	159 lb (72 kg)	July 5, 1970 (aged 23)	(Russia) Salavat Yulaev Ufa
22	D	Sergei Shendelev	6 ft 3 in (191 cm)	209 lb (95 kg)	January 19, 1964 (aged 30)	(Germany) Hedos München
23	F	Pavel Torgayev	6 ft 0 in (183 cm)	190 lb (86 kg)	January 25, 1966 (aged 28)	(Finland) TPS
24	F	Andrei Nikolishin	6 ft 0 in (183 cm)	216 lb (98 kg)	March 25, 1973 (aged 20)	(Russia) Dynamo Moskva
25	F	Vyacheslav Bezukladnikov	5 ft 9 in (175 cm)	187 lb (85 kg)	September 7, 1968 (aged 25)	(Russia) Lada Togliatti
26	D	Oleg Shargorodsky	6 ft 2 in (188 cm)	192 lb (87 kg)	November 19, 1969 (aged 24)	(Russia) Dynamo Moskva
28	F	Andrei Tarasenko	5 ft 10 in (178 cm)	179 lb (81 kg)	September 11, 1968 (aged 25)	(Russia) Torpedo Yaroslavl
29	F	Ravil Gusmanov	6 ft 1 in (185 cm)	190 lb (86 kg)	July 25, 1972 (aged 21)	(Russia) Traktor Chelyabinsk
30	G	Sergei Abramov	5 ft 11 in (180 cm)	207 lb (94 kg)	September 15, 1959 (aged 34)	(Russia) Itil Kazan

== Slovakia ==
Head coach: Július Šupler

No.	Pos.	Name	Height	Weight	Birthdate	Team
23	G	Miroslav Michalek	6 ft 3 in (191 cm)	192 lb (87 kg)	June 30, 1965 (aged 28)	-
1	G	Eduard Hartman	6 ft 0 in (183 cm)	181 lb (82 kg)	June 5, 1965 (aged 28)	(Slovakia) HK Dukla Trenčin
2	G	Jaromír Dragan	6 ft 0 in (183 cm)	190 lb (86 kg)	September 14, 1963 (aged 30)	(Slovakia) HC Košice
3	D	Jerguš Bača	6 ft 1 in (185 cm)	214 lb (97 kg)	January 4, 1965 (aged 29)	(United States) Milwaukee Admirals
5	D	Marián Smerčiak	6 ft 0 in (183 cm)	192 lb (87 kg)	December 24, 1972 (aged 21)	(Slovakia) HK Dukla Trenčin
6	D	Miroslav Marcinko (A)	6 ft 0 in (183 cm)	181 lb (82 kg)	January 16, 1964 (aged 30)	(Slovakia) HC Košice
7	D	Ľubomír Sekeráš	6 ft 0 in (183 cm)	176 lb (80 kg)	November 18, 1968 (aged 25)	(Slovakia) HK Dukla Trenčin
9	F	Vlastimil Plavucha	6 ft 0 in (183 cm)	181 lb (82 kg)	November 6, 1968 (aged 25)	(Slovakia) HC Košice
10	F	Oto Haščák	6 ft 1 in (185 cm)	198 lb (90 kg)	January 31, 1964 (aged 30)	(Sweden) Västra Frölunda HC
11	D	Vladimír Búřil	6 ft 3 in (191 cm)	212 lb (96 kg)	May 17, 1969 (aged 24)	(Slovakia) HC Slovan Bratislava
15	F	René Pucher	5 ft 11 in (180 cm)	163 lb (74 kg)	December 2, 1970 (aged 23)	(Slovakia) HC Košice
18	F	Miroslav Šatan	6 ft 2 in (188 cm)	194 lb (88 kg)	October 22, 1974 (aged 19)	(Slovakia) HK Dukla Trenčin
21	F	Branislav Jánoš	5 ft 9 in (175 cm)	179 lb (81 kg)	January 8, 1971 (aged 23)	(Slovakia) HK Dukla Trenčin
22	F	Roman Kontšek	6 ft 0 in (183 cm)	209 lb (95 kg)	June 11, 1970 (aged 23)	(Slovakia) HK Dukla Trenčin
25	D	Stanislav Medřik (A)	5 ft 11 in (180 cm)	183 lb (83 kg)	April 4, 1966 (aged 27)	(Slovakia) HK Dukla Trenčin
26	F	Peter Šťastný (C)	6 ft 1 in (185 cm)	201 lb (91 kg)	September 18, 1956 (aged 37)	(United States) St. Louis Blues
27	D	Ján Varholík	6 ft 0 in (183 cm)	198 lb (90 kg)	February 28, 1970 (aged 23)	(Slovakia) HC Košice
28	F	Ľubomír Kolník	6 ft 1 in (185 cm)	194 lb (88 kg)	January 23, 1968 (aged 26)	(Finland) JoKP
29	F	Jozef Daňo	6 ft 0 in (183 cm)	192 lb (87 kg)	December 28, 1968 (aged 25)	(Slovakia) HK Dukla Trenčin
39	F	Róbert Petrovický	5 ft 11 in (180 cm)	179 lb (81 kg)	October 26, 1973 (aged 20)	(United States) Springfield Indians
44	D	Róbert Švehla	6 ft 0 in (183 cm)	207 lb (94 kg)	January 2, 1969 (aged 25)	(Sweden) Malmö IF
68	F	Žigmund Pálffy	5 ft 10 in (178 cm)	183 lb (83 kg)	May 5, 1972 (aged 21)	(United States) Salt Lake Golden Eagles

== Sweden ==
Head coach: Curt Lundmark

Assistant coach: Pär Mårts

No.	Pos.	Name	Height	Weight	Birthdate	Team
1	G	Håkan Algotsson	5 ft 10 in (178 cm)	176 lb (80 kg)	August 5, 1966 (aged 27)	(Sweden) Västra Frölunda HC
2	D	Tomas Jonsson (A)	5 ft 11 in (180 cm)	183 lb (83 kg)	April 12, 1960 (aged 33)	(Sweden) Leksands IF
5	F	Patrik Juhlin	6 ft 0 in (183 cm)	207 lb (94 kg)	April 12, 1970 (aged 23)	(Sweden) Västerås IK
5	D	Christian Due-Boje	5 ft 7 in (170 cm)	170 lb (77 kg)	October 12, 1966 (aged 27)	(Sweden) Djurgårdens IF
7	D	Leif Rohlin	6 ft 1 in (185 cm)	212 lb (96 kg)	February 26, 1968 (aged 25)	(Sweden) Västerås IK
8	D	Magnus Svensson	5 ft 11 in (180 cm)	194 lb (88 kg)	March 1, 1963 (aged 30)	(Sweden) Leksands IF
11	F	Roger Hansson	6 ft 2 in (188 cm)	190 lb (86 kg)	July 13, 1967 (aged 26)	(Sweden) Malmö IF
12	F	Håkan Loob	5 ft 9 in (175 cm)	176 lb (80 kg)	July 3, 1960 (aged 33)	(Sweden) Färjestad BK
14	D	Fredrik Stillman	5 ft 8 in (173 cm)	170 lb (77 kg)	August 22, 1966 (aged 27)	(Sweden) HV71
15	F	Stefan Örnskog	5 ft 11 in (180 cm)	176 lb (80 kg)	April 4, 1969 (aged 24)	(Sweden) HV71
16	F	Niklas Eriksson	5 ft 10 in (178 cm)	190 lb (86 kg)	February 17, 1969 (aged 24)	(Sweden) Leksands IF
17	F	Daniel Rydmark	5 ft 10 in (178 cm)	187 lb (85 kg)	February 23, 1970 (aged 23)	(Sweden) Malmö IF
18	F	Jonas Bergqvist (A)	6 ft 0 in (183 cm)	203 lb (92 kg)	September 26, 1962 (aged 31)	(Sweden) Leksands IF
19	D	Kenny Jönsson	6 ft 3 in (191 cm)	207 lb (94 kg)	October 6, 1974 (aged 19)	(Sweden) Rögle BK
20	F	Jörgen Jönsson	6 ft 0 in (183 cm)	192 lb (87 kg)	September 29, 1972 (aged 21)	(Sweden) Rögle BK
21	F	Peter Forsberg	6 ft 1 in (185 cm)	205 lb (93 kg)	July 20, 1973 (aged 20)	(Sweden) MoDo Hockey
22	F	Charles Berglund (C)	5 ft 9 in (175 cm)	176 lb (80 kg)	January 18, 1965 (aged 29)	(Sweden) Djurgårdens IF
24	F	Andreas Dackell	5 ft 10 in (178 cm)	192 lb (87 kg)	December 29, 1972 (aged 21)	(Sweden) Brynäs IF
26	F	Mats Näslund	5 ft 7 in (170 cm)	161 lb (73 kg)	October 31, 1959 (aged 34)	(Sweden) Malmö IF
27	F	Patric Kjellberg	6 ft 2 in (188 cm)	212 lb (96 kg)	June 17, 1969 (aged 24)	(Sweden) HV71
30	G	Michael Sundlöv	5 ft 8 in (173 cm)	154 lb (70 kg)	October 11, 1965 (aged 28)	(Sweden) Brynäs IF
34	D	Roger Johansson	6 ft 3 in (191 cm)	194 lb (88 kg)	April 17, 1967 (aged 26)	(Sweden) Leksands IF
35	G	Tommy Salo	6 ft 0 in (183 cm)	179 lb (81 kg)	February 1, 1971 (aged 23)	(Sweden) Västerås IK

== United States ==
Head coach: Tim Taylor

Assistant coach: John Cunniff

No.	Pos.	Name	Height	Weight	Birthdate	Team
1	G	Mike Dunham	6 ft 2 in (188 cm)	201 lb (91 kg)	June 1, 1972 (aged 21)	(United States) Maine Black Bears
3	D	Matt Martin	6 ft 3 in (191 cm)	205 lb (93 kg)	April 30, 1971 (aged 22)	(Canada) St. John's Maple Leafs
4	D	Chris Imes	5 ft 10 in (178 cm)	187 lb (85 kg)	August 27, 1972 (aged 21)	(United States) Maine Black Bears
5	D	Brett Hauer	6 ft 1 in (185 cm)	207 lb (94 kg)	July 11, 1971 (aged 22)	(United States) Minnesota Duluth Bulldogs
7	D	Peter Laviolette (C)	6 ft 2 in (188 cm)	201 lb (91 kg)	December 7, 1964 (aged 29)	(United States) San Diego Gulls
8	F	Jeff Lazaro (A)	5 ft 9 in (175 cm)	183 lb (83 kg)	March 21, 1968 (aged 25)	(United States) Providence Bruins
10	F	David Roberts	5 ft 11 in (180 cm)	185 lb (84 kg)	May 28, 1970 (aged 23)	(United States) Michigan Wolverines
11	F	Brian Rolston	6 ft 2 in (188 cm)	214 lb (97 kg)	February 21, 1973 (aged 20)	(United States) Lake Superior State Lakers
12	F	Peter Ciavaglia	5 ft 10 in (178 cm)	179 lb (81 kg)	July 15, 1969 (aged 24)	(Sweden) Leksands IF
14	F	Craig Johnson	6 ft 3 in (191 cm)	198 lb (90 kg)	March 8, 1972 (aged 21)	(United States) Minnesota Golden Gophers
16	F	Dave Sacco (A)	6 ft 1 in (185 cm)	190 lb (86 kg)	July 31, 1971 (aged 22)	(United States) Boston University Terriers
17	F	Peter Ferraro	5 ft 11 in (180 cm)	181 lb (82 kg)	January 24, 1973 (aged 21)	(United States) Maine Black Bears
18	F	Ted Drury	6 ft 0 in (183 cm)	190 lb (86 kg)	September 13, 1971 (aged 22)	(Canada) Calgary Flames
19	F	John Lilley	5 ft 9 in (175 cm)	170 lb (77 kg)	August 3, 1972 (aged 21)	(United States) Seattle Thunderbirds
20	F	Mark Beaufait	5 ft 9 in (175 cm)	170 lb (77 kg)	May 13, 1970 (aged 23)	(United States) Kansas City Blades
21	D	Travis Richards	6 ft 1 in (185 cm)	194 lb (88 kg)	March 22, 1970 (aged 23)	(United States) Minnesota Golden Gophers
23	F	Todd Marchant	5 ft 10 in (178 cm)	181 lb (82 kg)	August 12, 1973 (aged 20)	(United States) Clarkson Golden Knights
25	F	Jim Campbell	6 ft 2 in (188 cm)	205 lb (93 kg)	April 3, 1973 (aged 20)	(Canada) Hull Olympiques
26	D	Barry Richter	6 ft 0 in (183 cm)	203 lb (92 kg)	September 11, 1970 (aged 23)	(United States) Wisconsin Badgers
27	F	Darby Hendrickson	6 ft 1 in (185 cm)	205 lb (93 kg)	August 28, 1972 (aged 21)	(United States) Minnesota Golden Gophers
30	G	Garth Snow	6 ft 3 in (191 cm)	201 lb (91 kg)	July 28, 1969 (aged 24)	(United States) Maine Black Bears
33	D	Ted Crowley	6 ft 2 in (188 cm)	187 lb (85 kg)	May 3, 1970 (aged 23)	(Canada) St. John's Maple Leafs

== Sources ==
- Duplacey, James (1998). Total Hockey: The official encyclopedia of the National Hockey League. Total Sports. ISBN 0-8362-7114-9.
- Podnieks, Andrew (2010). IIHF Media Guide & Record Book 2011. Moydart Pres.
- Hockey Hall Of Fame page on the 1994 Olympics
