= List of Olympic men's ice hockey players for Russia =

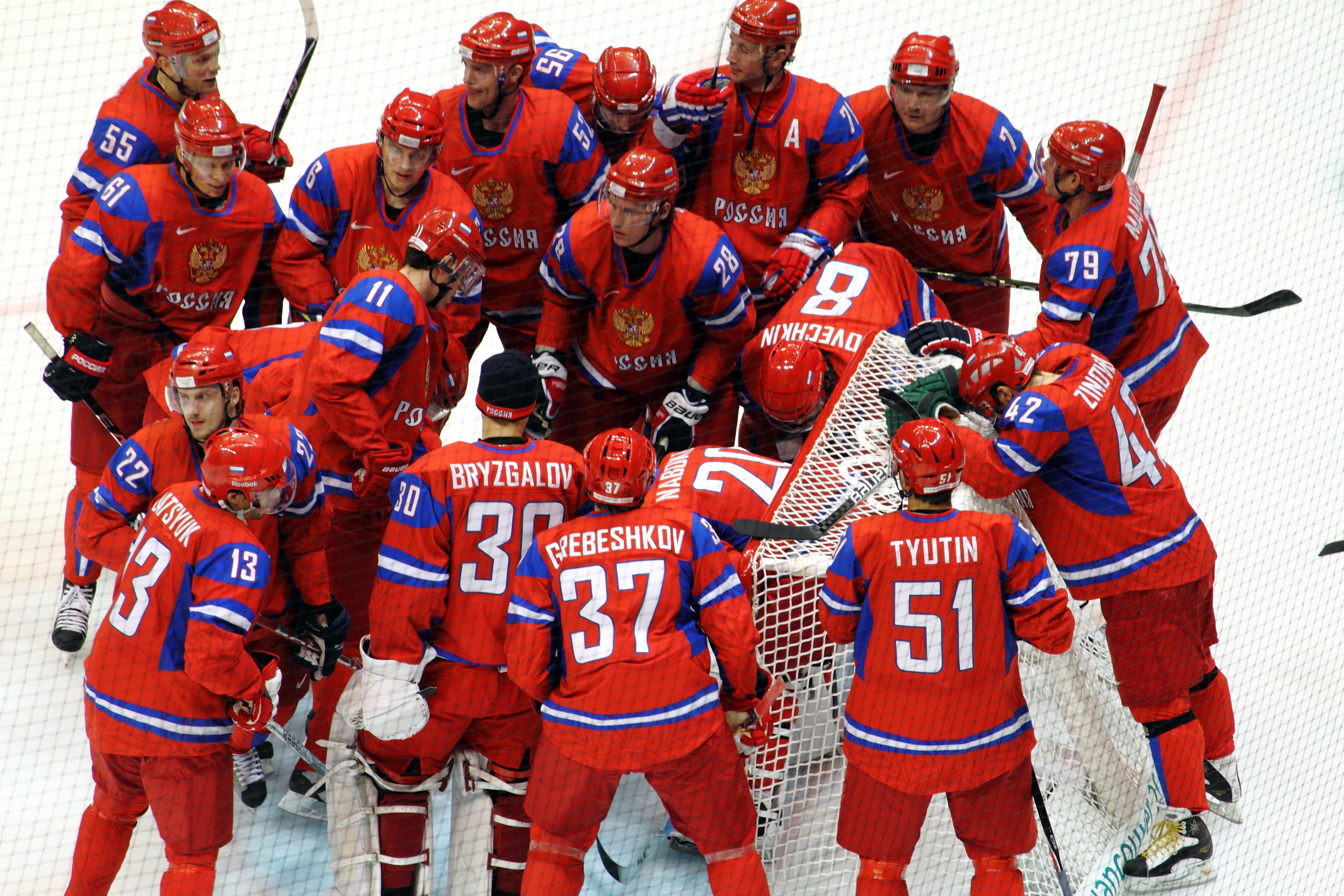
The Russian team gathers together before a game against Latvia during the 2010 Winter Olympics.

Men's ice hockey tournaments have been staged at the Olympic Games since 1920; after its introduction at the 1920 Summer Olympics, it was permanently added to the Winter Olympic Games in 1924. Russia has participated in 6 of 23 tournaments, sending 14 goaltenders and 84 skaters. The Russian national team is co-ordinated by the Ice Hockey Federation of Russia and players are chosen by the team's management staff.

Prior to the breakup of the Soviet Union in 1991, Russian players competed as part of the Soviet Union national ice hockey team. Nine former Soviet states became part of the IIHF and started competing internationally, including Belarus, Kazakhstan, Latvia and Russia. At the 1992 Olympics, Armenia, Belarus, Kazakhstan, Russia, Ukraine and Uzbekistan competed as one entity, known as the Unified Team. In the final, the Unified Team defeated Canada to win gold while Czechoslovakia won the bronze. Russia's first tournament as a separate nation came at the 1994 Games, where they lost the bronze medal game to Sweden. The following tournament, Russia advanced to the gold medal game, but was shut out by the Czech Republic and settled for the silver medal. After a bronze medal at the 2002 tournament, Russia has failed to medal in the past two Olympics. The 2014 tournament was hosted in Sochi, and the Russian team did not win a medal. They won the gold medal four years later, and a silver in 2022.

The Olympic Games were originally intended for amateur athletes, so the players of the National Hockey League (NHL) and other professional leagues were not allowed to compete. An agreement was reached in 1995 that allowed NHL players to compete in the Olympics, starting with the 1998 Games in Nagano, Japan.

Russia has won two medals in men's ice hockey, a silver medal in the 1998 Games, and a bronze at the 2002 Games; nine players—Pavel Bure, Valeri Bure, Sergei Federov, Sergei Gonchar, Darius Kasparaitis, Igor Kravchuk, Boris Mironov, Alexei Yashin and Alexei Zhamnov—have won medals with both teams. Three players have been inducted into the International Ice Hockey Hall of Fame and Hockey Hall of Fame – Pavel Bure, Sergei Fedorov, and Igor Larionov. Gonchar has played in 24 games over four tournaments, more than any other player. Bure has the record for most goals (11), while Pavel Datsyuk holds the record for most assists (15) and most points (20).

== Key ==
General terms
Term	Definition
GP	Games played
HHOF	Hockey Hall of Fame
IIHFHOF	International Ice Hockey Federation Hall of Fame
Olympics	Number of Olympic Games tournaments
Ref(s)	Reference(s)

Goaltender statistical abbreviations
Abbreviation	Definition
W	Wins
L	Losses
T	Ties
Min	Minutes played
SO	Shutouts
GA	Goals against
GAA	Goals against average

Skater statistical abbreviations
Abbreviation	Definition
G	Goals
A	Assists
P	Points
PIM	Penalty minutes

== Goaltenders ==
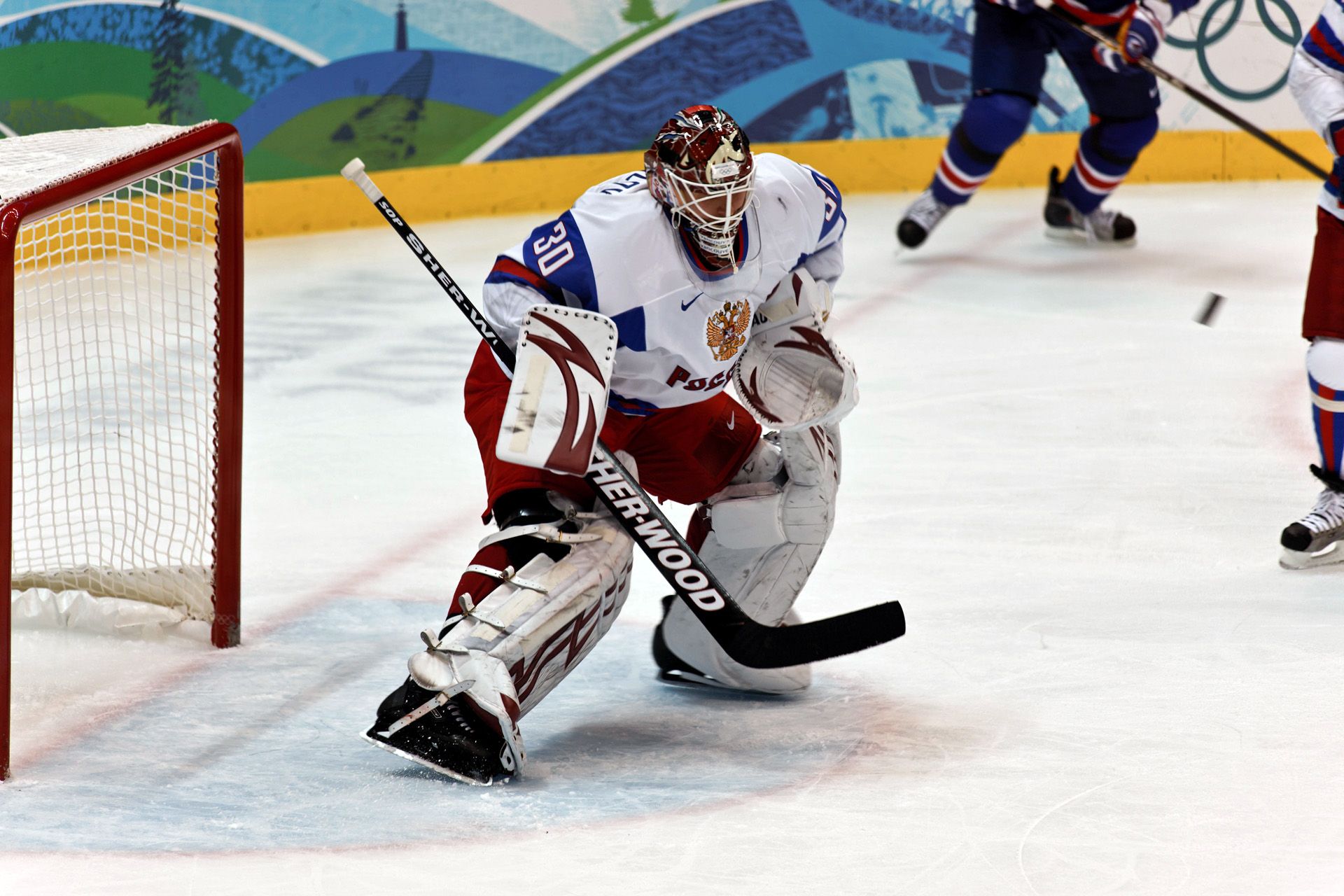
Ilya Bryzgalov is the only goaltender who was a member of three teams, and won a bronze medal in 2002.

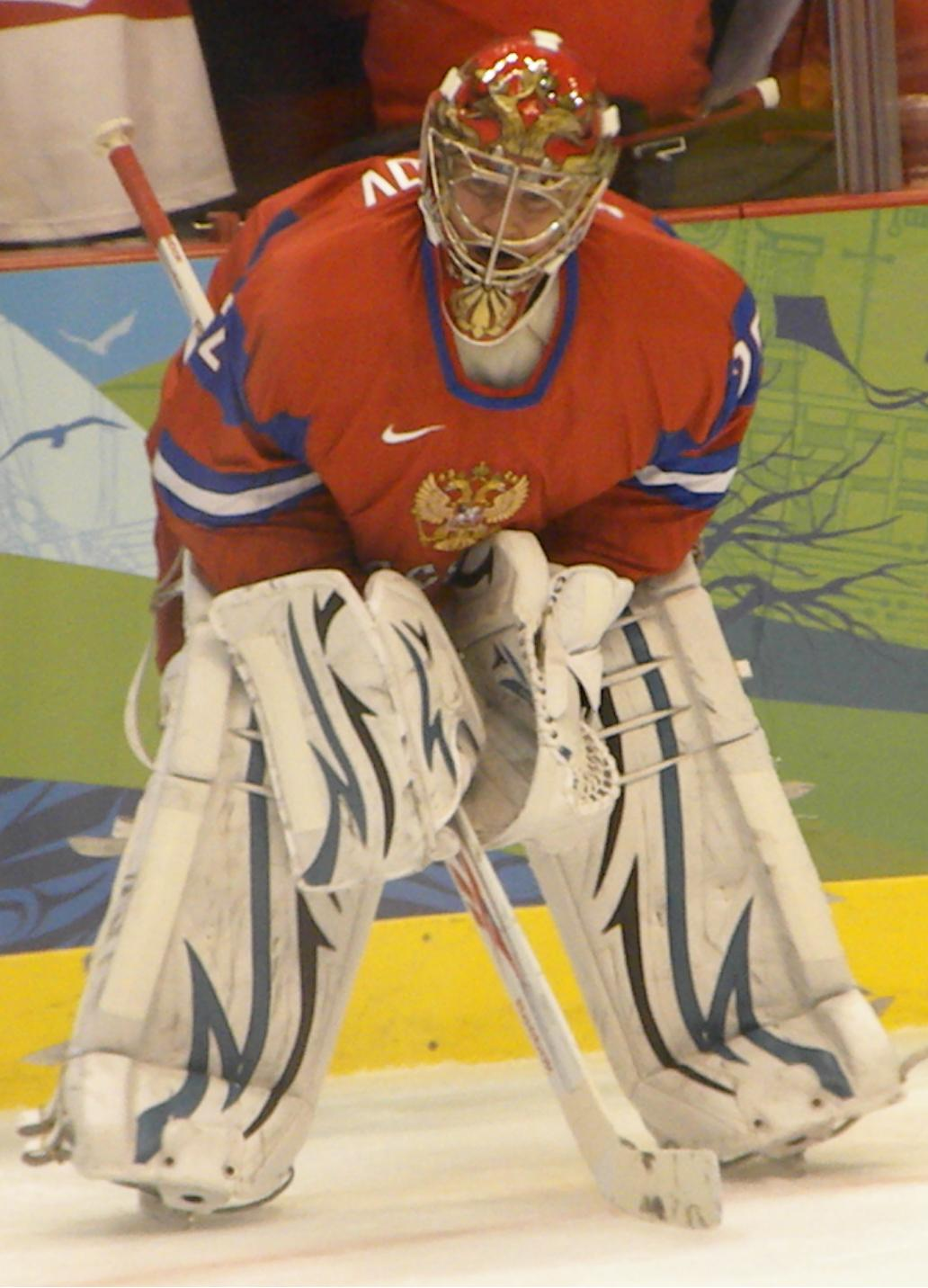
Evgeni Nabokov has played in more games (10) and won more games (6) than any other Russian goaltender.

Goaltenders
Player	Olympics	Tournament(s)	GP	W	L	T	Min	SO	GA	GAA	Medals	Notes	Ref(s)
Sergei Abramov	1	1994	3	1	1	0	140	0	5	2.14			
Sergei Bobrovsky	1	2014	3	1	1	0	157	1	3	1.15			
Ilya Bryzgalov	3	2002, 2006, 2010	3	0	2	0	161	0	8	2.98	Bronze (2002)		
Valeri Ivannikov	1	1994	1	0	1	0	60	0	4	4			
Nikolai Khabibulin	1	2002	6	3	2	1	359	1	14	2.34	Bronze (2002)		
Evgeni Nabokov	2	2006, 2010	10	6	3	0	504	3	18	2.14			
Mikhail Shtalenkov	1	1998	5	4	1	0	290	0	8	1.65	Silver (1998)		
Maxim Sokolov	1	2006	2	1	0	0	60	0	4	4			
Andrei Trefilov	2	1998	6	1	0	0	108	0	6	3.33	Silver (1998)		
Semyon Varlamov	2	2014	3	1	1	0	152	1	5	1.98			
Andrei Zuyev	1	1994	5	3	2	0	288	0	15	3.13			

=== Reserve goaltenders ===
These goaltenders were named to the Olympic roster, but did not receive any ice time during games. Ilya Bryzgalov did not play in any games during the 2002 Winter Olympics and Semyon Varlamov did not play during the 2010 Winter Olympics, but both started games at later tournaments.

Reserve goaltenders
Player	Olympics	Medals	Ref(s)
Yegor Podomatsky	2002	Bronze (2002)	
Oleg Shevtsov	1998	Silver (2002)	
Alexander Yeryomenko	2014		

== Skaters ==
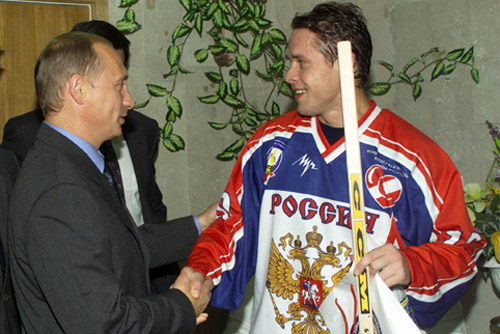
Pavel Bure (shown here shaking hands with Russian President Vladimir Putin) scored more goals than any other Russian ice hockey player.

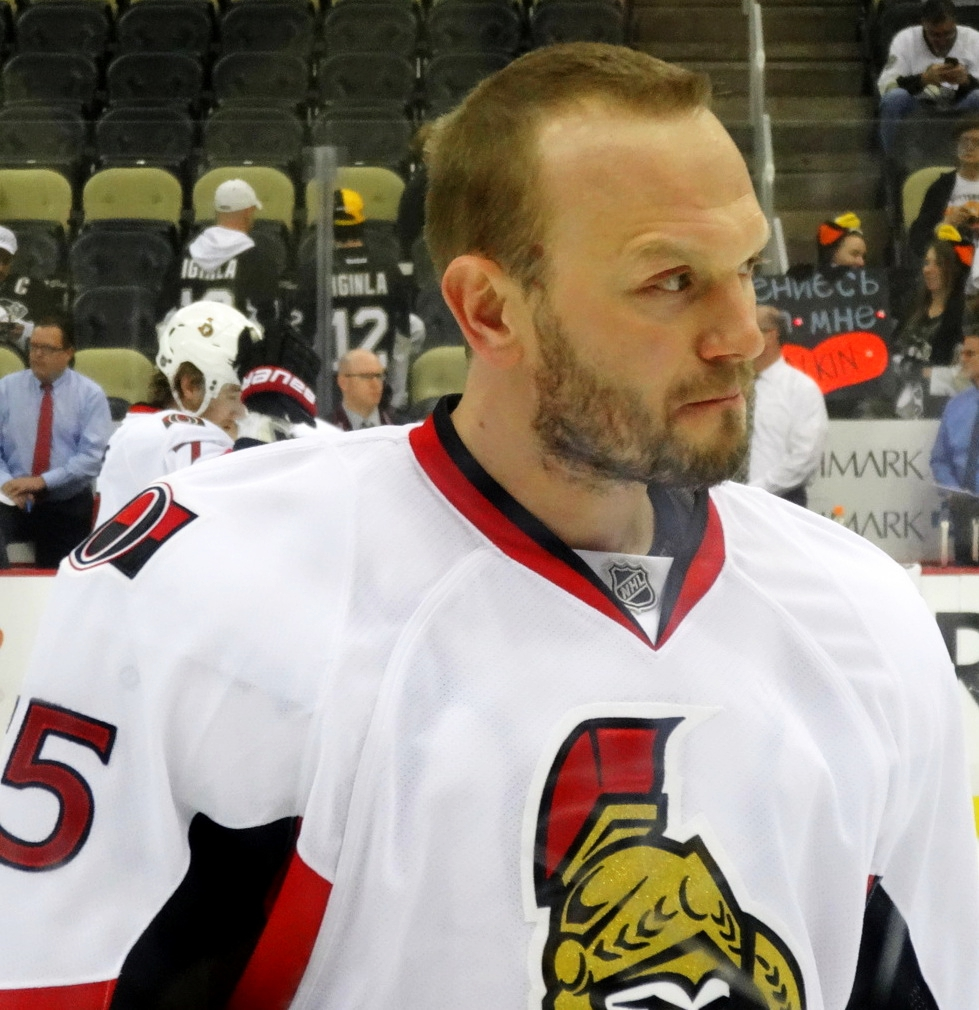
Sergei Gonchar has represented Russia in four Olympic tournaments.

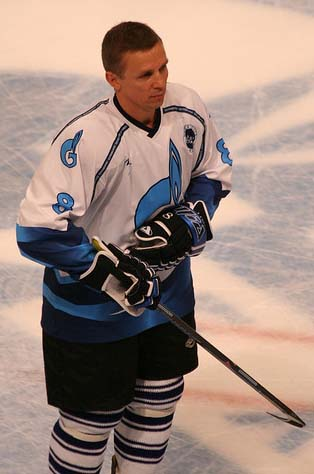
Igor Larionov served as captain of the 2002 team that won the bronze medal.

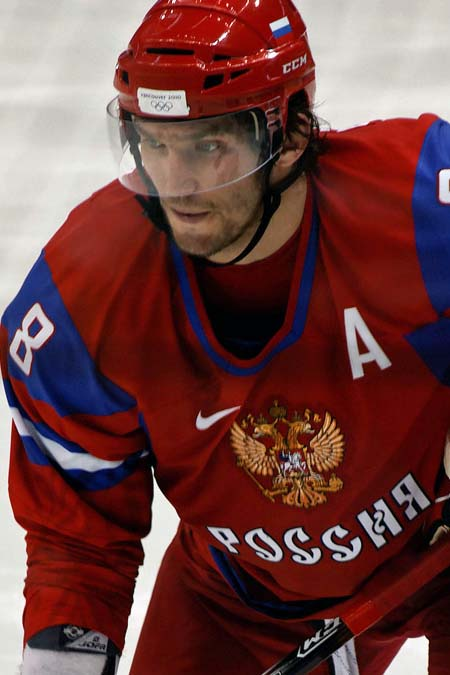
Alexander Ovechkin has scored seven goals in 12 games over two tournaments.

Skaters
Player	Olympics	Tournaments	GP	G	A	P	PIM	Medals	Notes	Ref(s)
Maxim Afinogenov	3	2002, 2006, 2010	18	4	3	7	14	Bronze (2002)		
Artem Anisimov	1	2014	5	0	0	0	2			
Anton Belov	1	2014	5	1	0	1	0			
Sergei Berezin	1	1994	8	3	2	5	2			
Vyacheslav Bezukladnikov	1	1994	8	0	0	0	4			
Pavel Bure	2	1998, 2002	12	11	1	12	10	Silver (1998); Bronze (2002)	Captain (1998); HHOF (2012); IIHFHOF (2012)	
Valeri Bure	2	1998, 2002	12	2	0	2	2	Silver (1998); Bronze (2002)		
Pavel Datsyuk	4	2002, 2006, 2010, 2014	23	5	15	20	12	Bronze (2002)		
Oleg Davydov	1	1994	8	1	0	1	0			
Dmitri Denisov	1	1994	8	3	1	4	4			
Sergei Fedorov	3	1998, 2002, 2010	16	3	11	14	18	Silver (1998); Bronze (2002)		
Alexander Frolov	1	2006	3	0	1	1	0			
Sergei Gonchar	4	1998, 2002, 2006, 2010	24	1	4	5	12	Silver (1998); Bronze (2002)		
Denis Grebeshkov	1	2010	4	0	1	1	2			
Alexei Gusarov	1	1998	6	0	1	1	8	Silver (1998)		
Ravil Gusmanov	1	1994	8	3	1	4	0			
Igor Ivanov	1	1994	8	0	0	0	2			
Dmitri Kalinin	1	2010	4	1	1	2	0			
Valeri Kamensky	1	1998	6	1	2	3	0	Silver (1998)		
Valeri Karpov	1	1994	8	3	1	4	2			
Darius Kasparaitis	3	1998, 2002, 2006	20	1	4	5	18	Silver (1998); Bronze (2002)		
Aleksandr Kharitonov	1	2006	8	1	1	2	6			
Konstantin Korneyev	1	2010	4	0	0	0	4			
Alexander Korolyuk	1	2006	6	1	1	2	6			
Ilya Kovalchuk	4	2002, 2006, 2010, 2014	23	9	5	14	47	Bronze (2002)		
Andrei Kovalenko	1	1998	6	4	1	5	14	Silver (1998)		
Alexei Kovalev	2	2002, 2006	14	7	3	10	8	Bronze (2002)	Captain (2006)	
Viktor Kozlov	2	2006, 2010	12	3	3	6	2			
Igor Kravchuk	2	1998, 2002	12	0	4	4	2	Silver (1998); Bronze (2002)		
Sergei Krivokrasov	1	1998	6	0	0	0	4	Silver (1998)		
Alexei Kudashov	1	1994	8	1	2	3	4			
Nikolai Kulemin	1	2014	5	0	0	0	2			
Oleg Kvasha	1	2002	5	0	0	0	0	Bronze (2002)		
Igor Larionov	1	2002	6	0	3	3	4	Bronze (2002)	Captain (2002); HHOF (2008); IIHFHOF (2008)	
Vladimir Malakhov	1	2002	6	1	3	4	4	Bronze (2002)		
Evgeni Malkin	3	2006, 2010, 2014	16	6	9	15	33			
Andrei Markov	3	2006, 2010, 2014	17	1	6	7	6			
Danny Markov	2	2002, 2010	13	0	3	3	4	Bronze (2002)		
Yevgeni Medvedev	1	2014	5	0	1	1	2			
Boris Mironov	2	1998, 2002	12	1	2	3	12	Silver (1998); Bronze (2002)		
Dmitri Mironov	1	1998	6	0	3	3	0	Silver (1998)		
Aleksey Morozov	2	1998, 2010	10	4	2	6	0	Silver (1998)	Captain (2010)	
Sergei Nemchinov	1	1998	6	1	0	1	0	Silver (1998)		
Ivan Nepryaev	1	2006	2	0	0	0	2			
Valeri Nichushkin	1	2014	5	1	0	1	0			
Nikita Nikitin	1	2014	5	0	1	1	0			
Andrei Nikolishin	1	1994, 2002	14	2	6	8	12	Bronze (2002)		
Ilya Nikulin	2	2010, 2014	7	0	1	1	4			
Alexander Ovechkin	3	2006, 2010, 2014	17	8	3	11	10		Media All-Star Team Best Forward (2010)	
Alexander Popov	1	2014	5	0	0	0	0			
Alexander Radulov	2	2010, 2014	9	4	4	8	8			
Sergei Samsonov	1	2002	6	1	2	3	4	Bronze (2002)		
Alexander Semin	2	2010, 2014	9	0	3	3	4			
Oleg Shargordsky	1	1994	8	0	0	0	4			
Sergei Shendelev	1	1994	8	0	0	0	6			
Alexander Smirnov	1	1994	8	1	0	1	8		Captain (1994)	
Sergei Sorokin	1	1994	8	1	2	3	6			
Maxim Sushinsky	1	2006	8	2	3	5	8			
Andrei Tarasenko	1	1994	8	2	0	2	0			
Vladimir Tarasenko	1	2014	5	0	1	1	0			
Vladimir Tarasov	1	1994	8	0	0	0	2			
Andrei Taratukhin	1	2006	5	0	0	0	2			
Alexei Tereshchenko	1	2014	5	1	2	3	2			
Sergei Tertyshny	1	1994	8	0	0	0	4			
Viktor Tikhonov	1	2014	2	0	1	1	0			
German Titov	1	1998	6	1	0	1	6	Silver (1998)		
Pavel Torgayev	1	1994	8	2	1	3	10			
Oleg Tverdovsky	1	2002	6	1	1	2	0	Bronze (2002)		
Fedor Tyutin	3	2006, 2010, 2014	17	0	3	3	10			
Igor Varitsky	1	1994	8	1	1	2	2			
Alexander Vinogradov	1	1994	8	3	2	5	4			
Vitaly Vishnevskiy	1	2006	8	0	1	1	4			
Vyacheslav Voinov	1	2014	5	0	0	0	0			
Anton Volchenkov	2	2006, 2010	12	0	1	1	4			
Alexei Yashin	3	1998, 2002, 2006	20	5	7	12	4	Silver (1998); Bronze (2002)		
Alexei Yemelin	1	2014	5	0	0	0	8			
Georgi Yevtyukhin	1	1994	8	0	2	2	10			
Dmitri Yushkevich	1	1998	6	0	0	0	2	Silver (1998)		
Danis Zaripov	1	2010	4	2	0	2	2			
Valeri Zelepukin	1	1998	6	1	2	3	0	Silver (1998)		
Alexei Zhamnov	2	1998, 2002	12	3	1	4	6	Silver (1998); Bronze (2002)		
Alexei Zhitnik	1	1998	6	0	2	2	2	Silver (1998)		
Sergei Zhukov	1	2006	8	0	2	2	6			
Sergei Zinovjev	1	2010	4	0	2	2	0			

== See also ==
- Russia men's national ice hockey team
