= Lars =

- Pronunciation: Danish: [ˈlɑːs] German: [ˈlaʁs]; informal [ˈlaːs] Norwegian: [ˈlɑːʂ] Swedish: [ˈlɑːʂ]
- Gender: Male
- Name day: August 10

Origin
- Origin: Latin (homonymous Etruscan name exists)
- Meaning: "Laurel" "From Laurentum". "crowned with laurel", man from Laurentum

Other names
- Related names: Laurentius, Lawrence, Lauritz, Laurits, Lorenz, Lorik

Lars is a common male name in Scandinavian countries and Germany.

== Origin ==
Lars is derived from the Latin name Laurentius, which means "from Laurentum" or "crowned with laurel", and is therefore related to the names Laurence and Lauren.

A homonymous Etruscan name was borne by several Etruscan kings, and later used as a last name by the Roman Lartia family. The etymology of the Etruscan name is unknown.

== Notable people ==
- Lars I, bishop of Linköping (1236–1258)
- Lars Mikael Åkerfeldt (born 1974), Swedish composer and vocalist
- Lars II, bishop of Linköping (1292–1307)
- Lars (archbishop of Uppsala) (1255–1267)
- Lars Kristian Abrahamsen (1855–1921), Norwegian politician
- Lars Ahlfors (1907–1996), Finnish Fields Medal recipient
- Lars Amble (1939–2015), Swedish actor and director
- Lars Herminius Aquilinus, ancient Roman consul
- Lars Bak (born 1980), Danish road bicycle racer
- Lars Bak (computer programmer) (born 1965), Danish computer programmer
- Lars Beckman (born 1967), Swedish politician
- Lars Bender (born 1989), German footballer
- Lars Blixt (footballer, born 1965) (born 1965), Swedish footballer
- Lars Blixt (footballer, born 1976) (born 1976), Norwegian footballer
- Lars Christensen (1884–1965), Norwegian shipowner, whaling magnate and philanthropist
- Lars Ditlev (1951–2021), Danish-American football player
- Lars Engberg (1943–2017), Danish politician
- Lars Magnus Ericsson (1846–1926), Swedish inventor
- Lars Eriksson (footballer, born 1926) (1926–1994), Swedish footballer
- Lars Eriksson (footballer, born 1965), Swedish footballer
- Lars Eriksson (ice hockey) (born 1961), Swedish ice hockey player
- Lars Eriksson (musician) (born 1980), Swedish singer-songwriter
- Lars Eriksson (politician) (born 1970), Swedish politician
- Lars Frederiksen (born 1971), American musician
- Lars Frölander (born 1974), Swedish swimmer
- Lars Eilebrecht (born 1972), German software engineer
- Lars Eller (born 1989), Danish ice hockey player
- Lars Engsund (born 1968), Swedish politician
- Lars Grael (born 1964), Brazilian sailor
- Lars Granaas (born 1979), Norwegian footballer
- Lars Gullin (1928–1976), Swedish jazz saxophonist
- Lars Haglund (born 1940), Swedish discus thrower
- Lars Hedström (1919–2004), Swedish diplomat
- Lars Jorgensen (born 1970), American swimmer and college coach
- Lars Peter Hansen (born 1952), American economist and Nobel laureate
- Lars Haugen (born 1987), Norwegian ice hockey player
- Lars Hegaard (born 1950), Danish composer and guitarist
- Lars Heggen (born 2005), Norwegian cross-country skier
- Lars Hjortsberg (1772–1843), Swedish actor
- Lars Holte (born 1966), Norwegian trance producer and DJ
- Lars Hörmander (1931–2012), Swedish mathematician and Fields Medal recipient
- Lars Isacsson (born 1970), Swedish politician
- Lars Iyer (born 1970), British novelist and philosopher
- Lars Jansson (cartoonist) (1926–2000), Finnish author and cartoonist
- Lars Jansson (composer) (born 1951), Swedish jazz pianist and composer
- Lars Jönsson (film producer) (born 1961), Swedish film producer
- Lars Jonsson (ice hockey) (born 1982), Swedish ice hockey player
- Lars Jonsson (illustrator) (born 1952), Swedish artist and ornithologist
- Lars Jönsson (tennis) (born 1970), Swedish tennis player
- Lars Kleppich (born 1967), Australian sailor
- Lars Klingbeil (born 1978), German politician
- Lars Knudsen (born 1962), Danish researcher in cryptography
- Lars Kragh Andersen (born 1980), Danish activist
- Lars Krutak (born 1971), American tattoo anthropologist
- Lars Kuppi (born 1971), German politician
- Lars Lagerbäck (born 1948), Swedish football manager
- Lars Johan Yngve Lannerbäck (born 1963), Swedish musician, better known as Yngwie Malmsteen
- Lars Larsen Forsæth (1759–1839), Norwegian farmer and representative
- Lars Larsen (1948–2019), Danish businessman
- Lars Larsen (1758–1844), Danish merchant, ship-owner and shipbuilder
- Lars Larsen (footballer, born 1951), Danish footballer
- Lars Larsen (footballer, born 1970), Danish footballer
- Lars Larsen (footballer, born 1978), Danish footballer
- Lars Larsen (timber merchant) (1737–1817), Danish timber merchant
- Lars Larson (born 1959), American conservative talk radio show host
- Lars Larsson Molin, known as Lasse-Maja (1785–1845), Swedish thief and memoirist
- Lars Leiro (1914–2005), Norwegian politician
- Lars Lindberg Christensen (born 1970), Danish astronomer
- Lars Ljungberg (born 1977), Swedish musician
- Lars Lönnroth (born 1935), Swedish literary scholar
- Lars-Erik Lövdén (born 1950), Swedish politician
- Lars Mikkelsen (born 1964), Danish actor
- Lars Mittank (born 1986), German man who disappeared in 2014
- Lars Monsen (born 1963), Norwegian adventurer and journalist
- Lars Nootbaar (born 1997), American baseball player
- Lars Olsen Aukrust (1886–1965), Norwegian politician
- Lars Olsen (born 1961), Danish footballer
- Lars Olsen (cyclist) (born 1965), Danish cyclist
- Lars Olsen Skrefsrud (1840–1910), Norwegian missionary
- Lars Onsager (1903–1976), Norwegian chemist and Nobel laureate
- Lars Pensjö, creator of the LPMud software
- Lars Petrus (born 1960), Swedish Rubik's Cube champion
- Lars Porsena, Etruscan king of Clusium
- Lars Püss (born 1966), Swedish politician
- Lars Løkke Rasmussen (born 1964), Prime Minister of Denmark, 2009 to 2011 and 2015 to 2019
- Lars Kristian Relander (1883–1942), Finnish president
- Lars Ranger (born 1999), Norwegian footballer
- Lars Rem (born 1966), Norwegian politician
- Lars Riedel (born 1967), German discus thrower
- Lars Rainer Rüetschi (born 1977), Swiss musician
- Lars Rønningen (born 1965), Norwegian sport wrestler
- Lars Saabye Christensen (born 1953), Norwegian author
- Lars Schütze (born 1974), German politician
- Lars Sigmundstad (born 1943), Norwegian politician
- Lars Skalm (born c. 1430), Finnish noble and mayor of Turku
- Lars Spuybroek (born 1959), Dutch architect
- Lars Stjernkvist (born 1955), Swedish politician and journalist
- Lars Tjærnås (born 1960), Norwegian footballer
- Lars Tolumnius (died 437 BC), Etruscan king of Veii
- Lars Troell (1916–1998), Swedish surgeon
- Lars von Trier (born 1956), Danish film director
- Lars Ulrich (born 1963), Danish drummer for the heavy metal band Metallica
- Lars Unnerstall (born 1990), German footballer
- Lars Vikør (born 1946), Norwegian linguist, translator and educator
- Lars Vilks (1946–2021), Swedish artist
- Lars Wegendal (born 1949), Swedish politician
- Lars Windfeld (born 1962), Danish footballer
- Lars-Gösta Elofsson (born 1953), birth name of Swedish politician Blåvitt Elofsson
- Lars-Jörn Zimmer (born 1970), German politician

== Fictional characters ==
- Lars, the Go Jetters' expert mechanic
- Lars, in the Adult Swim television pilot Paid Programming
- Lars, in the 1979 film Scavenger Hunt, played by Arnold Schwarzenegger
- Laramie "Lars" Barriga, a supporting character in the Steven Universe cartoon series
- Lars, in the Star Trek: The Original Series episode The Gamesters of Triskelion
- Lars, the unseen husband of Phyllis Lindstrom in The Mary Tyler Moore Show
- Lars Alexandersson, in the Tekken series
- Lars Fillmore, in the animated movie Futurama: Bender's Big Score
- Lars Lindstrom, the lead character of the 2007 film Lars and the Real Girl, portrayed by Ryan Gosling
- Dr. Lars Pinfield, in the 2024 film Ghostbusters: Frozen Empire, portrayed by James Acaster
- Lars Rodriguez, in the Rocket Power TV series
- Lars Umlaut, in the Guitar Hero series
- Lars, the main character (a baby polar bear) in the children's book series The Little Polar Bear by Hans de Beer
- Lars, in the 2011 film The Thing, a prequel to the 1982 film of the same name
- Lars, in the 2003 film "101 Dalmatians II: Patch's London Adventure", a German artist
- Lars, a family name in the "Star Wars" film series, a matrimonial branch of the Skywalker family

== See also ==
- Lares
- Lars (disambiguation)
- Larsen (surname)
- Lasse
