= Lasse =

Lasse is a common masculine given name in Nordic countries. It is also often a nickname for people named Lars or Lauri.

Notable people named Lasse include:

== Given name ==
- Lasse Aasland (1926–2001), Norwegian politician
- Lasse Berg Johnsen (born 1999), Norwegian footballer
- Lasse Vigen Christensen (born 1994), Danish footballer
- Lasse Flø (born 2005), Danish footballer
- Lasse Gjertsen (born 1984), Norwegian animator
- Lasse Glomm (1944–1996), Norwegian film director, screenwriter and producer
- Lasse Günther (born 2003), German footballer
- Lasse Hautala (born 1963), Finnish politician
- Lasse Ikonen (born 2003), Finnish footballer
- Lasse Jensen, professor of theoretical chemistry
- Lasse Jensen (golfer) (born 1984), Danish golfer
- Lasse Johansson (footballer) (born 1975), Swedish footballer
- Lasse Juliussen (born 1986), Norwegian politician
- Lasse Jürgensen (born 1998), Danish footballer
- Lasse Karjalainen (born 1974), Finnish retired footballer
- Lasse Kjus (born 1971), Norwegian former alpine skier
- Lasse Kukkonen (born 1981), Finnish retired ice hockey defenceman
- Lasse Lagerblom (born 1980), Finnish footballer
- Lasse Lehre (born 1988), Norwegian politician
- Lasse Lindbjerg (born 1992), Danish retired footballer
- Lasse Lührs (born 1996), German triathlete
- Lasse Nielsen (disambiguation)
- Lasse Nilsen (born 1995), Norwegian footballer
- Lasse Nieminen (born 1966), Finnish ice hockey player
- Lasse Ottesen (born 1974), Norwegian former ski jumper
- Lasse Paakkonen (born 1986), Finnish cross-country skier
- Lasse Haugaard Pedersen (born 1995), Danish politician
- Lasse Petersdotter (born 1990), German politician
- Lasse Pirjetä (born 1974), Finnish ice hockey forward
- Lasse Pöysti (1927–2019), Finnish actor, director, theatre manager and writer
- Lasse Qvist (born 1987), Danish football player
- Lasse Rempe (born 1978), German mathematician
- Lasse Rimmer (born 1972), Danish comedian
- Lasse Rosenboom (born 2002), German footballer
- Lasse Sætre (born 1974), Norwegian retired speed skater
- Lasse Sandberg (1924–2008), Swedish children's book author with his wife Inger, cartoonist and comic creator
- Lasse Schulz (born 2003), Finnish-German footballer
- Lasse Sigurdsen (born 1997), Norwegian footballer
- Lasse Sobiech (born 1991), German footballer
- Lasse Sørensen (disambiguation)
- Lasse Thoresen (born 1949), Norwegian composer and writer
- Lasse Virén (born 1949), Finnish Olympic champion long-distance runner
- Lasse from Huittinen (died 1488), Finnish thief

== Nickname ==
Given name Lars unless otherwise indicated.

- Lasse Åberg (born 1940), Swedish actor, musician, film director and artist
- Lasse Berghagen, Swedish singer and songwriter
- Lasse Björn (1931–2024), Swedish ice hockey player
- Lasse Granqvist (born 1967), Swedish sports commentator
- Lasse Hallström (born 1946), Swedish film director
- Lars-Eric Lasse Holm (born 1943), Swedish composer, lyricist and singer
- Lasse Johansson (1638–1674), pseudonym Lucidor, Swedish baroque poet
- Lasse Kronér (born 1962), Swedish television presenter and musician
- Lasse Lindtner (born 1955), Norwegian actor
- Lasse Lönndahl (1928–2022), Swedish singer and actor
- Lasse Mårtenson (1934–2016), Finnish singer and composer
- Lasse Norres (born 1952), Finnish record producer and politician
- Lars-Ove Lasse Wellander (1952–2023), Swedish guitarist, best known for his association with ABBA
- Lars-Åke Lasse Wiklöf (1944–2008), politician in the Åland Islands of Finland

== See also ==
- Lasse-Maja, nickname of Swedish thief and memoirist Lars Larsson Molin (1785–1845)
- Lassie
