= Lars Andersen =

Lars Andersen may refer to:

- Lars Andersen (archer) (born 1964), Danish archer and a speed world record holder
- Lars Andersen (captain), namesake of Andersen Island
- Lars Andersen (footballer), Danish footballer in 2008–09 Danish Cup
- Lars Håkon Andersen (born 1974), Norwegian ice hockey player
- Lars Hedegaard Andersen (born 1975), Danish cricketer
- Lars Kragh Andersen (born 1980), Danish activist

== See also ==
- Lars Anderson (disambiguation)
