= Lars Blixt =

Lars Blixt may refer to:

- Lars Blixt (footballer, born 1965) (born 1965), Swedish footballer
- Lars Blixt (footballer, born 1976) (born 1976), Norwegian footballer
