= Blixt (surname) =

Blixt is a surname. Notable people with the surname include:

- Anders Blixt (born 1959), Swedish game designer and journalist
- David Blixt (born 1973), American author, actor, and director
- Jonas Blixt (born 1984), Swedish golfer
- Lars Blixt (born 1976), Norwegian footballer
- Lars Blixt (born 1965), Swedish footballer
- Liselott Blixt (born 1965), Swedish-Danish politician
