= Lars Andersson =

Lars Andersson may refer to:

- Lars Andersson (canoeist) (born 1948), Swedish Olympic canoer
- Lars Andersson (cyclist) (born 1988), Swedish cyclist
- Lars Andersson (equestrian) (born 1956), Swedish Olympic equestrian
- Lars Andersson (footballer), Swedish footballer
- Lars Andersson (politician) (born 1964), Swedish politician
- Lars Andersson (writer) (born 1954), Swedish writer, winner of the 1996 Samfundet De Nio Grand Prize
- Lars Andersson i Hedensbyn (1888–1974), Swedish politician
- Lars Gabriel Andersson (1868–1951), Swedish educator and herpetologist
- Laurentius Andreae (c. 1470–1552), Swedish clergyman and scholar

== See also ==
- Lars Anderson (disambiguation)
