= VfR Aalen =

German association football club from Aalen, Baden-Württemberg

- Full name: Verein für Rasenspiele 1921 Aalen e.V.
- Founded: 8 March 1921; 105 years ago
- Ground: OSTALB ARENA (Rohrwang)
- Capacity: 11,183
- President: Roland Vogt
- Head coach: Beniamino Molinari
- League: Regionalliga Südwest (IV)
- 2025–26: Oberliga Baden-Württemberg, 1st of 18 (promoted)
- Website: http://www.vfr-aalen.de
Home colours	Away colours

Verein für Rasenspiele 1921 Aalen e.V., known simply as VfR Aalen, is a German football club based in Aalen, Baden-Württemberg. The football team is part of a larger sports club which also offers its members gymnastics, table tennis, and cheerleading. The club's greatest success came in 2011–12 when it finished second in the 3. Liga and earned promotion to the 2. Bundesliga for the first time.

== History ==
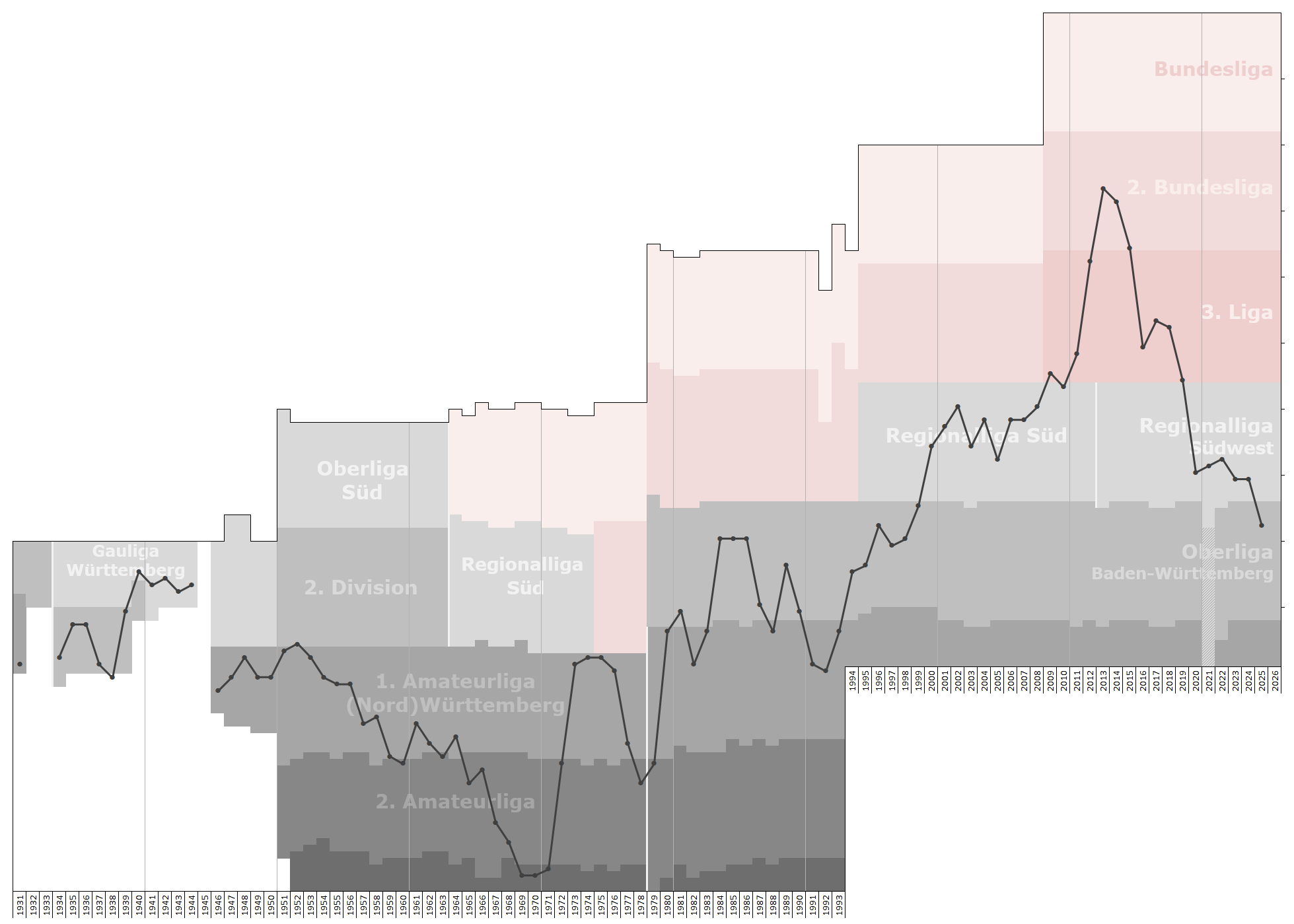
Historical chart of VfR Aalen league performance

The club was founded on 8 March 1921 out of the football department of the gymnastics club MTV Aalen and has led a largely unremarked existence as a lower division side. In 1939, Aalen was promoted to the first division Gauliga Württemberg, one of sixteen top-flight leagues established through the 1933 re-organization of German football under the Third Reich. They played there until 1945, typically finishing in the lower half of the table.

After the war the club was joined by Boxclub Aalen in 1950. They went on to the third tier Landesliga Württemberg and in 1951 captured the title in what had become the Amateurliga Württemberg (III). After a single season appearance in the 2nd Oberliga Süd in 1951–52 they returned to play in the III and IV divisions over the next two decades. The club slipped to fifth division play in the late 1970s for a couple of seasons before recovering itself. At the turn of the millennium, Aalen managed an advance to the third division Regionalliga Süd and played at that level as a mid-table side from 1999 onwards. A fourth-place finish in 2007–08 qualified them for the new 3. Liga. They were immediately relegated after just one season, but captured the Regionalliga title in 2011, and returned to third-tier play. A second-place result in 2011–12 earned the team promotion to the 2. Bundesliga. After two good seasons in the league the club finished last in the league in 2014–15 and was relegated.

Following relegation the club experienced financial difficulties and was initially unable to provide coverage for the required €5.6 million for a 3. Liga licence but was eventually able to apply for one. It deregistered its reserve team, VfR Aalen II, playing in the fifth tier Oberliga, to save money. In December 2016, the club filed for bankruptcy while competing in the 2016–17 season, leading to a nine point-deduction decided by the DFB on 10 March 2017, a further relegation to the Regionalliga Südwest ensued in 2019

== Honours ==
=== League ===
- 3. Liga
  - Runners-up: 2012
- Oberliga Baden-Württemberg (IV)
  - Champions: 1999
- Amateurliga Württemberg (III)
  - Champions: 1951
- Amateurliga Nordwürttemberg (III)
  - Champions: 1974, 1975
- Verbandsliga Württemberg (IV–VI)
  - Champions: 1980, 1983, 2014^{‡}

=== Cup ===
- Württemberg Cup
  - Winners: 1972, 1979, 1986, 2001, 2002, 2004, 2010, 2024
  - Runners-up: 1987, 1992, 1999

- ^{‡} Denotes title won by reserve team.

== Players ==
=== Current squad ===
As of 8 September 2026

Note: Flags indicate national team as defined under FIFA eligibility rules; some limited exceptions apply. Players may hold more than one non-FIFA nationality.

No.	Pos.	Nation	Player
1	GK	GER	Andreas Wick
2	DF	ENG	Reece Hannam
4	DF	DEN	Lasse Jürgensen
5	DF	GER	Michael Schaupp
7	FW	BIH	Saša Maksimović
8	MF	GER	Jascha Döringer
9	FW	ENG	Michael Kleinschrodt
10	MF	GER	Emre Kahriman
11	MF	GER	Benjamin Kindsvater
14	FW	GER	Niklas Antlitz
15	MF	GER	Loris Groß
16	DF	GER	Thomas Geyer

No.	Pos.	Nation	Player
17	DF	GER	Ali Odabas
18	FW	GER	Dean Melo
19	FW	GER	Sean Seitz
20	DF	GER	Tom Barth
21	DF	GER	David Grözinger
22	GK	GER	Maximilian Otto
25	FW	KOS	Henrick Selitaj
27	MF	GER	Vico Meien
33	GK	GER	Hannes Sauter
34	MF	GER	Stefan Wächter
40	MF	GER	Melvin Onos
46	MF	GER	Gianluca Gaudino

== Recent managers ==
Recent managers of the club:

Manager	Start	Finish
Walter Modick	19 October 1997	15 April 2000
Helmut Dietterle	16 April 2000	30 June 2000
Willi Entenmann	1 July 2000	13 August 2001
Helmut Dietterle	14 August 2001	7 December 2002
Peter Zeidler	8 December 2002	30 August 2004
Slobodan Pajic	31 August 2004	30 June 2005
Frank Wormuth	1 July 2005	8 December 2006
Edgar Schmitt	15 January 2007	27 August 2008
Jürgen Kohler	28 August 2008	16 November 2008
Petrik Sander	21 November 2008	5 May 2009
Rainer Scharinger	6 May 2009	27 December 2010
Ralph Hasenhüttl	2 January 2011	30 June 2013
Stefan Ruthenbeck	1 July 2013	12 June 2015
Peter Vollmann	12 June 2015	30 June 2018
Argirios Giannikis	30 June 2018	10 February 2019
Rico Schmitt	13 February 2019	30 June 2019
Roland Seitz	1 July 2019	21 March 2021
Uwe Wolf	24 March 2021	17 February 2022
Christian Demirtaş	17 February 2022	Present

== Recent seasons ==
The recent season-by-season performance of the club:

=== VfR Aalen ===
Season	Division	Tier	Position
1999–2000	Regionalliga Süd	III	10th
2000–01	Regionalliga Süd	III	7th
2001–02	Regionalliga Süd	III	4th
2002–03	Regionalliga Süd	III	10th
2003–04	Regionalliga Süd	III	6th
2004–05	Regionalliga Süd	III	12th
2005–06	Regionalliga Süd	III	6th
2006–07	Regionalliga Süd	III	6th
2007–08	Regionalliga Süd	III	4th ↑
2008−09	3. Liga	III	19th ↓
2009–10	Regionalliga Süd	IV	1st ↑
2010−11	3. Liga	III	16th
2011−12	3. Liga	III	2nd ↑
2012–13	2. Bundesliga	II	9th
2013–14	2. Bundesliga	II	11th
2014–15	2. Bundesliga	II	18th ↓
2015−16	3. Liga	III	15th
2016−17	3. Liga	III	11th
2017−18	3. Liga	III	12th
2018−19	3. Liga	III	20th ↓
2019–20	Regionalliga Südwest	IV	14th
2020–21	Regionalliga Südwest	IV	13th
2021–22	Regionalliga Südwest	IV	12th
2022–23	Regionalliga Südwest	IV	15th
2023–24	Regionalliga Südwest	IV	15th ↓
2024–25	Oberliga Baden-Württemberg	V	4th

=== VfR Aalen II ===
Season	Division	Tier	Position
1999–2000			
2000–01			
2001–02			
2002–03			
2003–04	Bezirksliga Kocher/Rems	VII	2nd
2004–05	Bezirksliga Kocher/Rems	VII	10th
2005–06	Bezirksliga Kocher/Rems	VII	1st ↑
2006–07	Landesliga Württemberg 2	VI	1st ↑
2007–08	Verbandsliga Württemberg	V	8th
2008–09	Verbandsliga Württemberg	VI	9th
2009–10	Verbandsliga Württemberg	VI	5th
2010–11	Verbandsliga Württemberg	VI	10th
2011–12	Verbandsliga Württemberg	VI	11th ↓
2012–13	Landesliga Württemberg 2	VII	1st ↑
2013–14	Verbandsliga Württemberg	VI	1st ↑
2014–15	Oberliga Baden-Württemberg	V	13th (withdrawn)
2015–present	defunct		

- With the introduction of the Regionalligas in 1994 and the 3. Liga in 2008 as the new third tier, below the 2. Bundesliga, all leagues below dropped one tier.

Key

↑ Promoted	↓ Relegated

== Stadium ==
The team plays its home matches in the OSTALB-ARENA – popularly known as the Rohrwang – which has a capacity of 11,183.
