= Lars Anderson =

Lars Anderson may refer to:

- Lars Anderson (baseball) (born 1987), American baseball player
- Lars Anderson (wrestler) (born 1939), American former professional wrestler

== See also ==
- Larz Anderson (1866–1937), American diplomat
- Lars Andersen (disambiguation)
- Lars Andersson (disambiguation)
