= Lars (archbishop of Uppsala) =

Archbishop of Uppsala from 1255 to 1267

Lars was the name of the Archbishop of Sweden 1255–1267.

Lars is a Swedish form of the Latin name Laurentius, which in English is Lawrence. This was the name Lars used as an archbishop. His birth name is unknown.

Lars was recruited from the recently established Franciscan monastery in Enköping. Since the monastery is unlikely to have had time to recruit Swedish monks, it is possible that he was foreign.

In 1255, when Lars had just recently been ordained (which he was in the primate Lund), a papal letter arrived. The Pope expressed his belief in the Swedish monarch Birger Jarl. The situation in Sweden was still shaky. There was an ongoing struggle for the throne, which later forced the antagonists to tax the clergies to support their war.

Another papal letter in 1257 expressed the Pope's support for crusades to the east, towards the Swedish parts of Finland that were either not yet Christianized, or had turned apostate. The inspiration came from the crusades to Jerusalem.

Lars was dedicated to enforcing celibacy among priests. This was a problem that had still not been solved in Sweden, despite papal efforts and threats. The usual reason given was the low population in Sweden, which made it necessary for priests to marry and have children. Even though Lars was known for trying to uphold celibacy, in 1258, he had to send a request to the Pope about not having to excommunicate those who broke the rule. We can imagine how common it was since this was necessary.

In 1258, the move of the archbishopric to its present location was decided. It would, however, not be realized for another decade. The reason was that the present location, Östra Aros, had grown in significance.

When Lars died in early March 1267, he was buried among his brothers at the monastery in Enköping.

== See also ==
- List of archbishops of Uppsala
