= Lars Andersson i Hedensbyn =

Swedish politician

Lars Andersson i Hedensbyn (22 September 1888 – 29 March 1974) was a Swedish politician. He was a member of the Centre Party.
