= Luigi Da Corte =

Italian ice hockey player

Personal information
- Nationality: Italian
- Born: 10 June 1973 (age 52) Auronzo di Cadore, Italy

Sport
- Sport: Ice hockey

Luigi Da Corte (born 10 June 1973) is an Italian ice hockey player. He competed in the men's tournament at the 1994 Winter Olympics.
