= Lasse Lehre =

Norwegian politician (born 1988)

Deputy Member of the Storting
- In office 1 October 2013 – 30 September 2025
- Constituency: Oppland (2013–2021); Akershus (2021–2025)

Personal details
- Born: 6 July 1988 (age 37)
- Party: Conservative Party (since 2003)
- Spouse: Maren Aasan (m. 2024)

Lasse Aasan Lehre (born 6 July 1988) is a Norwegian politician. From 2013 to 2025, he was a deputy member of the Storting. From 2011 to 2019, he was a member of the county council of Oppland. From 2007 to 2023, he was a municipal councillor of Lunner.
