= Lars Taylor =

Swiss musician

- Also known as: Lars Rainer Rüetschi
- Born: March 24, 1977 (age 48); Switzerland
- Genres: Jazz fusion; Pop
- Occupations: Fusion guitarist, composer, and producer
- Instruments: Guitar; Piano
- Years active: 1998–present
- Formerly of: 1. Futurologischer Congress

Lars Rainer Rüetschi (born March 24, 1977), professional known as Lars Taylor, is a Swiss fusion guitarist, composer, and producer. He has collaborated with many notable musicians and Grammy Award winners, including Donny McCaslin, Mark Soskin, Paul Brown, and Bob Glaub.

== Early life ==
Lars Taylor was born in Switzerland, but spent a portion of his childhood in Brazil, where music such as Bossa Nova influenced him. He played the piano for seven years before discovering the guitar at the age of 14. At the age of 15, Lars bought a 4-track recorder, recording, arranging and producing his own compositions, having already his first professional studio job as a session player for a single recording when he was 17.

== Career ==
From 1998 to 2002, Lars Taylor studied jazz guitar in the Basel Music Academy's jazz faculty with French–Marseiller guitar virtuoso Francis Coletta as his teacher.

In 2005, Taylor moved to Berlin, looking for better opportunities in music. After playing at sessions, he quickly became involved in the scene and toured through Berlin clubs with Nigerian singer Leon Adonri and his band The Peacekeeper & The Purple Egg. In the same year, Taylor returned for a few weeks to Switzerland to co-write and record for the Lindale Project, playing with Grammy-nominated American saxophone player Donny McCaslin and Mark Soskin.

In 2006, Taylor was cast for the German pop band Thalaya. After being discovered in 2008 by the Angolan rapper Diamondog, he became part of his band playing in legendary places and festivals like Kunsthaus Tacheles, Fête de la Musique and old DDR place Kaffee Burger.

In 2009 Taylor was also a session guitar player for the New German Wave band 1. Futurologischer Congress, contributed tracks for the album Küssmichdoch from German pop singer Christin Henkel and played with her group at Fritz Nacht der Talente 2008. They were nominated for the German Rock & Pop Award 2007.

In 2009, he spent a few months in Bucharest, Romania. Returning to Switzerland afterward, with his wife Gabriela. In 2018, he collaborated with 2-time Grammy Award producer Paul Brown.

In 2019, Taylor released his first solo single Sweet Onion, Which entered the Top 40 in the Smooth Jazz Charts.

In 2020, Taylor released Keep It Going (with Paul Brown as a producer and the mixing of Bob Glaub on bass). During that same year, he released Dance Forever (Charles Berthoud on bass; produced and mixed by Ken Navarro). In 2021 he released Smile.

In 2022, Taylor released a new single called Blue Sphere, which received over 50,000 streams on Spotify, and spent 26 weeks total on various radio charts. It also made it to the Top 30 on the Groove Jazz Music Chart. In 2022, he also released Flying (To Another Place) and The Waltz.

Taylor was featured in Akustik Gitarre magazine in 2022.

In 2023, he released the singles Electric Night, The Beauty Of Life and Carioca.

== Discography ==
=== Singles ===
- Sweet Onion (2019)
- Keep It Going (2020)
- Dance Forever (2020)
- Smile (2021)
- Blue Sphere (2022)
- Flying (To Another Place) (2022)
- The Waltz (2022)
- Electric Night (2023)
- Beauty of Life (2023)
- Carioca (2023)

=== Albums ===
- Poetry in Motion ( Cinematic Solo Works) (2022)
