= Lars Larsen (footballer, born 1951) =

Danish footballer

Personal information
- Full name: Lars Larsen
- Date of birth: 8 December 1951 (age 74)
- Place of birth: Copenhagen, Denmark
- Height: 1.95 m (6 ft 5 in)
- Position: Defender

Youth career
- Boldklubben Frem

Senior career*
Years	Team	Apps	(Gls)
1970–1989	Boldklubben Frem	514	(94)

International career
1973–1976	Denmark U23	5	(0)
1974–1979	Denmark	22	(0)
- * Club domestic league appearances and goals

Lars Larsen (born 8 December 1951) is a Danish former professional footballer who played as a defender. He spent his entire career at Boldklubben Frem, making 514 appearances in which he scored 94 goals.

== Club career ==
Larsen made his first-team debut for Boldklubben Frem on 20 September 1970 against Akademisk Boldklub (AB). He played almost 20 years for the club, making his last appearance on 30 October 1988 away against Helsingør IF.

== International career ==
Larsen earned 22 international caps for the Denmark national football team, a tally which could have been higher if it had not been for his fear of flying. He made his debut for Denmark on 3 June 1974 at Københavns Idrætspark against rivals Sweden, with his direct opponent being striker Ralf Edström. Denmark lost 2–0.

== Personal life ==
After his career, Larsen worked at Kommunedata and BRFKredit. He lives in Hvidovre with his wife Sanne. Together they have 3 children. He currently works in electronic data processing for SDC.
