= Lars Andersen (archer) =

Danish archer and artist

- Other name: larsandersen23
- Occupation: Archer Painter Writer
- Years active: 2011 to present
- Known for: Lars Andersen: A new level of archery

Lars Andersen (born 8 November 1964) is a Danish painter and archer. Claiming to hold a world record for speed, he is able to shoot 10 arrows in 4.9 seconds, or 3 arrows in 0.6 seconds.

A private student of Otto Frello, Andersen graduated from School of Visual Art. He describes himself as a Danish painter and writer.

His video posted in November 2012 went viral across the web. Another one of his videos, "A New Level of Archery", was posted on YouTube on 23 January 2015, receiving over 23 million views in one week, in which Andersen demonstrates how to shoot while holding multiple arrows in his draw hand and shooting while on the move, jumping, close up, far away and hanging upside-down. However, many of the historical and scientific claims made in the video have been contested or discredited, and few of the ideas have gained traction with other archers and internet personalities. In April 2015, Lars responded to the claims against him and his technique. In the video, Lars attempts to clarify his statements, some of which were in agreement with arguments against some of his original videos claims, mainly that this style was forgotten or he re-invented it, but some of them countering the criticism against him, such as the texts he refers to in his video not including the topic of speed shooting and the archer's paradox.

In a video posted on YouTube in 2017, Andersen demonstrated his ability to shoot arrows that turn in mid-flight.

== Records ==
Andersen broke the Guinness World Record of "The most consecutive arrows shot through a keyhole" with 7 shots in Lyngby, Denmark, on 1 June 2022.
