= Lars Skalm =

Finnish noble and politician (born c. 1430)

Lars Skalm (born Lorentz Skallman, circa 1430 in Pargas) was a Finnish noble, having been granted hereditary nobility by King Christian I of Denmark in 1461 for helping his army against rebels in Sweden. He served as Mayor of Turku from 1501 to 1502.

== Bibliography ==
- Ramsay, Jully: Frälsesläkter i Finland intill stora ofreden . Helsinki: Förlagsaktiebolaget Söderström & Co, 1909–16.
- Elgenstierna, Gustav: The introductory part of the Swedish adjective . Stockholm: PA Nordstedt & Söner, 1925–34.
- Hiekkanen, Markus; Klemelä, Marja; Ahlström-Taavitsainen, Camilla; Rosenlew, Fredrik: Sauvo Church . Sauvo, 1996.
- Hausen, Reinhold: Finlands medeltidsurkunder I-VIII . Helsinki: National Archives of Finland, 1910–35.
