= Lasse Nielsen =

Lasse Nielsen may refer to:

- Lasse Nielsen (footballer, born 1987), Danish footballer who plays for Lyngby BK
- Lasse Nielsen (footballer, born 1988), Danish footballer who plays for Göztepe
- Lasse Nielsen (canoeist) (born 1984), Danish sprint canoeist
- Lasse Nielsen (filmmaker), Danish filmmaker, co-writer and co-director of Leave Us Alone and You Are Not Alone

== See also ==
- Lasse Nilsen (born 1995), Norwegian footballer
