= Ola Severin =

Swedish footballer (born 1964)

Personal information
- Date of birth: 20 November 1964 (age 61)
- Position: Midfielder

Senior career*
Years	Team	Apps	(Gls)
1989–1995	Trelleborgs FF		
2001–2002	Ystads IF		

Managerial career
- 2012: Lunds BK (assistant)
- * Club domestic league appearances and goals

Ola Severin (born 20 November 1964) is a Swedish retired football midfielder.
