= Lasse Jürgensen =

Danish footballer (born 1998)

Personal information
- Date of birth: 16 February 1998 (age 28)
- Place of birth: Germering, Germany
- Height: 1.92 m (6 ft 4 in)
- Position: Midfielder

Team information
- Current team: VfR Aalen

Youth career
- 2005–2011: TSV Gräfelfing
- 2011–2012: SC Unterpfaffenhofen-Germering
- 2012–2017: FC Augsburg

Senior career*
Years	Team	Apps	(Gls)
2017–2020	FC Augsburg II	63	(1)
2020–2022	SC Verl	32	(1)
2022–2023	SV Rödinghausen	8	(0)
2023–2024	VfR Aalen	27	(2)
2024–2026	FV Illertissen	18	(1)
2026–	VfR Aalen	0	(0)

International career^{‡}
2014	Denmark U16	3	(0)
2015	Denmark U17	1	(0)
- * Club domestic league appearances and goals as of 26 June 2026 ‡ National team caps and goals as of 22 May 2021 (UTC)

Lasse Jürgensen (born 16 February 1998) is a Danish professional footballer who plays as a midfielder for German club VfR Aalen.
