= Lasse Nieminen =

Finnish ice hockey left winger

- Born: August 29, 1966 (age 60) Jyväskylä, Finland
- Height: 5 ft 9 in (175 cm)
- Weight: 172 lb (78 kg; 12 st 4 lb)
- Position: Left wing
- Shot: Left
- Played for: JYP Jyväskylä
- National team: Finland
- Playing career: 1983–2000; 2005–2006

Lasse Nieminen (born August 29, 1966) is a Finnish former professional ice hockey left winger.

Nieminen played a total of 521 games in the SM-liiga for JYP. He played with the team from 1983 to 1990, 1991 to 1996 and 1997 to 1998. After leaving JYP, he played in the I-Divisioona for Diskos and in Sweden's Division 2 for Halmstad Hammers before retiring in 2000. Nieminen then came out of retirement in 2005 to play for the Adelaide Avalanche of the Australian Ice Hockey League for one season before retiring again for good.
