= Sergey Tertyshny =

Russian ice hockey player

Personal information
- Nationality: Russian
- Born: 3 June 1970 (age 55) Chelyabinsk, Russia

Sport
- Sport: Ice hockey

Sergey Tertyshny (born 3 June 1970) is a Russian ice hockey player. He competed in the men's tournament at the 1994 Winter Olympics.

== Career statistics ==
=== Regular season and playoffs ===
			Regular season					Playoffs
Season	Team	League	GP	G	A	Pts	PIM	GP	G	A	Pts	PIM
1986–87	Metallurg Chelyabinsk	URS.2	3	0	0	0	2	—	—	—	—	—
1987–88	Traktor Chelyabinsk	URS	19	0	0	0	4	—	—	—	—	—
1987–88	Metallurg Chelyabinsk	URS.2	4	2	0	2	0	—	—	—	—	—
1988–89	Metallurg Chelyabinsk	URS.2	2	0	0	0	0	—	—	—	—	—
1988–89	SKA Sverdlovsk	URS.2	42	2	2	4	20	—	—	—	—	—
1989–90	SKA Leningrad	URS	4	0	0	0	0	—	—	—	—	—
1989–90	SKA Sverdlovsk	URS.2	18	1	1	2	16	—	—	—	—	—
1990–91	SKA Leningrad	URS	28	2	2	4	12	—	—	—	—	—
1991–92	Traktor Chelyabinsk	CIS	36	1	2	3	18	8	3	0	3	2
1992–93	Traktor Chelyabinsk	IHL	41	8	3	11	10	8	2	0	2	4
1993–94	Traktor Chelyabinsk	IHL	37	8	8	16	22	6	0	1	1	0
1994–95	Portland Pirates	AHL	55	0	17	17	12	—	—	—	—	—
1995–96	Portland Pirates	AHL	42	6	18	24	43	7	1	2	3	0
1996–97	Metallurg Magnitogorsk	RSL	44	6	9	15	18	7	1	1	2	0
1997–98	Metallurg Magnitogorsk	RSL	36	3	3	6	20	10	1	0	1	2
1998–99	Metallurg Magnitogorsk	RSL	39	1	3	4	14	16	0	7	7	6
1999–2000	Metallurg Magnitogorsk	RSL	31	1	9	10	10	9	1	1	2	6
2000–01	Lada Togliatti	RSL	44	1	7	8	14	4	1	0	1	0
2001–02	Lada Togliatti	RSL	2	0	0	0	0	—	—	—	—	—
2001–02	Avangard Omsk	RSL	20	0	1	1	18	4	0	0	0	25
2003–04	Traktor Chelyabinsk	RUS.2	49	2	7	9	16	12	0	1	1	4
2004–05	Traktor Chelyabinsk	RUS.2	48	5	9	14	32	8	0	0	0	6
2005–06	Mechel Chelyabinsk	RUS.2	30	0	5	5	20	—	—	—	—	—
URS/CIS totals			87	3	4	7	34	8	3	0	3	2
AHL totals			97	6	35	41	55	7	1	2	3	0
RSL totals			216	12	32	44	94	51	4	9	13	39

=== International ===
Year	Team	Event	GP	G	A	Pts	PIM
1988	Soviet Union	EJC	6	0	3	3	6
1990	Soviet Union	WJC	7	0	1	1	0
1994	Russia	OG	8	0	0	0	4
1999	Russia	WC	6	1	1	2	6
Junior totals			13	0	4	4	6
Senior totals			14	1	1	2	10

"Sergei Tertyshny". Elite Prospects.
