= Lars Håkon Andersen =

Norwegian ice hockey player

Lars Håkon Andersen (born 13 January 1974) is a former Norwegian ice hockey player. He was born in Fredrikstad, Norway. He played for the Norwegian national ice hockey team at the 1994 Winter Olympics.
