= Vladimir Tarasov (ice hockey) =

Russian ice hockey player

Personal information
- Nationality: Russian
- Born: 21 March 1968 (age 57) Novosibirsk, Russia

Sport
- Sport: Ice hockey

Vladimir Tarasov (born 21 March 1968) is a Russian ice hockey player. He competed in the men's tournament at the 1994 Winter Olympics.

== Career statistics ==
=== Regular season and playoffs ===
			Regular season					Playoffs
Season	Team	League	GP	G	A	Pts	PIM	GP	G	A	Pts	PIM
1987–88	Metallurg Novokuznetsk	URS.2	72	4	3	7	84	—	—	—	—	—
1988–89	SKA Novosibirsk	URS.2	69	2	8	10	68	—	—	—	—	—
1989–90	SKA Novosibirsk	URS.2	68	2	8	10	56	—	—	—	—	—
1990–91	Lada Togliatti	URS.2	60	6	1	7	46	—	—	—	—	—
1991–92	Lada Togliatti	CIS	30	1	2	3	29	—	—	—	—	—
1992–93	Lada Togliatti	IHL	10	1	7	8	40	10	0	0	0	5
1992–93	CKS VVS Samara	RUS.2	9	1	3	4	12	—	—	—	—	—
1993–94	Lada Togliatti	IHL	45	5	7	12	28	12	1	2	3	2
1994–95	Lada Togliatti	IHL	51	3	4	7	49	12	0	1	1	14
1995–96	Lada Togliatti	IHL	50	1	8	9	40	7	0	1	1	4
1996–97	Lada Togliatti	RSL	42	2	11	13	28	11	1	5	6	0
1997–98	Lada Togliatti	RSL	45	0	10	10	32	5	0	2	2	2
1998–99	Severstal Cherepovets	RSL	41	0	4	4	58	3	0	1	1	0
1999–2000	Severstal Cherepovets	RSL	35	0	6	6	28	8	1	2	3	2
2000–01	Severstal Cherepovets	RSL	8	0	0	0	0	—	—	—	—	—
2000–01	Severstal–2 Cherepovets	RUS.3	3	1	1	2	4	—	—	—	—	—
2000–01	SKA St. Petersburg	RSL	9	0	0	0	4	—	—	—	—	—
2001–02	SKA St. Petersburg	RSL	46	0	3	3	58	—	—	—	—	—
2001–02	SKA–2 St. Petersburg	RUS.3	2	0	0	0	2	—	—	—	—	—
2002–03	CSK VVS Samara	RUS.2	31	1	9	10	14	—	—	—	—	—
2003–04	Kristall Saratov	RUS.2	1	0	0	0	0	—	—	—	—	—
2003–04	Kristall–2 Saratov	RUS.3	31	1	9	10	14	—	—	—	—	—
2003–04	Energia Kemerovo	RUS.2	5	0	0	0	0	—	—	—	—	—
2005–06	Khimik-SKA Novopolotsk	BLR	34	0	3	3	32	—	—	—	—	—
URS.2 totals			269	14	20	34	254	—	—	—	—	—
IHL totals			156	10	26	36	157	41	1	4	5	25
RSL totals			226	2	34	36	208	27	2	10	12	4

=== International ===
Year	Team	Event	GP	G	A	Pts	PIM
1994	Russia	OG	8	0	0	0	2
Senior totals			8	0	0	0	2

"Vladimir Tarasov". Elite Prospects.
