= Igor Ivanov (ice hockey) =

Russian ice hockey player

Personal information
- Nationality: Russian
- Born: 26 October 1970 (age 54) Moscow, Russia

Sport
- Sport: Ice hockey

Igor Ivanov (born 26 October 1970) is a Russian ice hockey player. He competed in the men's tournament at the 1994 Winter Olympics.

== Career statistics ==
=== Regular season and playoffs ===
			Regular season					Playoffs
Season	Team	League	GP	G	A	Pts	PIM	GP	G	A	Pts	PIM
1988–89	CSKA Moscow	URS	16	1	1	2	11	—	—	—	—	—
1988–89	SKA MVO Kalinin	URS.2	15	1	1	2	8	—	—	—	—	—
1989–90	CSKA Moscow	URS	14	0	0	0	6	—	—	—	—	—
1989–90	SKA MVO Kalinin	URS.2	12	0	0	0	10	—	—	—	—	—
1990–91	Krylya Sovetov Moscow	URS	20	1	1	2	0	—	—	—	—	—
1991–92	Krylya Sovetov Moscow	CIS	36	1	3	4	20	7	1	0	1	2
1992–93	Krylya Sovetov Moscow	IHL	42	5	10	15	15	7	0	1	1	4
1993–94	Krylya Sovetov Moscow	IHL	44	6	3	9	8	1	0	0	0	0
1994–95	Krylya Sovetov Moscow	IHL	52	3	11	14	40	4	0	0	0	0
1995–96	EC KAC	AUT	38	13	5	18	44	—	—	—	—	—
1996–97	EC KAC	AUT	2	0	1	1	4	—	—	—	—	—
1998–99	ESV Bayreuth	GER.3	17	2	6	8	4	—	—	—	—	—
1998–99	HC Martigny	SUI.2	5	1	1	2	8	—	—	—	—	—
1999–2000	EC Kapfenberg	AUT.2	27	20	18	38	22	—	—	—	—	—
2000–01	EC Kapfenberg	AUT	45	15	22	37	58	—	—	—	—	—
2001–02	EK Zell am See	AUT	32	2	7	9	16	5	1	1	2	0
2002–03	EC KAC	AUT	39	6	12	18	30	6	2	3	5	4
2003–04	EC KAC	AUT	48	8	5	13	28	8	0	0	0	2
2004–05	EC KAC	AUT	39	7	4	11	24	12	0	1	1	16
2005–06	EC KAC	AUT	36	3	1	4	20	—	—	—	—	—
2006–07	EC KAC	AUT	56	1	7	8	84	—	—	—	—	—
2007–08	EK Zell am See	AUT.2	32	10	19	29	32	4	0	2	2	0
2008–09	EK Zell am See	AUT.2	28	9	17	26	38	8	1	1	2	31
2009–10	Dornbirner EC	AUT.2	30	7	15	22	28	7	2	1	3	6
2010–11	VEU Feldkirch	AUT.2	23	1	6	7	18	—	—	—	—	—
2011–12	Kitzbüheler EC	AUT.4	24	19	15	34	26	2	0	0	0	0
2012–13	Kitzbüheler EC	AUT.3	22	10	19	29	14	2	0	0	0	2
2013–14	Kitzbüheler EC	AUT.3	20	5	14	19	16	8	4	3	7	18
2014–15	Kitzbüheler EC	INL	29	1	6	7	44	4	0	2	2	6
2015–16	EHC Kundl	AUT.4	21	7	6	13	20	5	0	0	0	12
2016–17	EHC Althofen	AUT.4	15	3	6	9	8	8	2	2	4	8
2017–18	EHC Althofen	AUT.4	16	2	4	6	18	6	1	0	1	6
2018–19	USC Velden	AUT.4	19	3	10	13	14	—	—	—	—	—
2019–20	USC Velden	AUT.4	18	2	8	10	28	3	0	0	0	0
URS/CIS totals			86	3	5	8	37	7	1	0	1	2
IHL totals			138	14	24	38	63	12	0	1	1	4
AUT totals			335	55	64	119	208	31	3	5	8	22

=== International ===
Year	Team	Event	GP	G	A	Pts	PIM
1988	Soviet Union	EJC	6	0	4	4	0
1989	Soviet Union	WJC	7	3	1	4	2
1990	Soviet Union	WJC	6	2	3	5	6
1994	Russia	OG	8	0	0	0	2
Junior totals			19	5	8	13	8
Senior totals			8	0	0	0	2

"Igor Ivanov". Elite Prospects.
