= Georgy Yevtyukhin =

Russian ice hockey player

Georgy Yevtyukhin Георгий Евтюхин
- Born: 9 May 1970 (age 56) Moscow, Russian SFSR, USSR
- Height: 1.84 m (6 ft 0 in)
- Weight: 87 kg (192 lb; 13 st 10 lb)
- Position: Centre
- Shot: Right
- Played for: Mechel Chelyabinsk; Metallurg Novokuznetsk; Spartak Moscow; Nippon Paper Cranes; Eisbären Berlin
- National team: Russia
- Playing career: 1988–2005

Georgy Vitalyevich Yevtyukhin (Russian: Георгий Витальевич Евтюхин, also romanized as Georgy Evtyukhin, Georgi Yevtyukhin; born 9 May 1970) is a Russian former professional ice hockey centre.

== Career ==
Yevtyukhin spent the majority of his career playing in the Soviet Hockey League and the Russian Superleague for HC Spartak Moscow. He competed in the men's tournament at the 1994 Winter Olympics. He was an assistant coach for SKIF Nizhny Novgorod of the Russian Women's Hockey League during the 2007–08 season and served as the team‘s head coach for the first part of 2008–09.

== Career statistics ==
=== Regular season and playoffs ===
			Regular season					Playoffs
Season	Team	League	GP	G	A	Pts	PIM	GP	G	A	Pts	PIM
1989–90	Traktor Lipetsk	URS.3	65	15	6	21	16	—	—	—	—	—
1990–91	Traktor Lipetsk	URS.3	63	28	34	62	52	—	—	—	—	—
1990–91	Spartak Moscow	URS	24	0	2	2	2	—	—	—	—	—
1990–91	Buran Voronezh	URS.2	8	1	0	1	8	—	—	—	—	—
1990–91	Traktor Lipetsk	URS.3	4	2	1	3	2	—	—	—	—	—
1991–92	Spartak Moscow	CIS	32	1	10	11	12	6	0	0	0	6
1991–92	Argus Moscow	CIS.3	1	0	0	0	2	—	—	—	—	—
1992–93	Spartak Moscow	IHL	41	8	14	22	14	3	0	3	3	0
1993–94	Spartak Moscow	IHL	44	13	38	51	42	6	1	2	3	0
1994–95	Spartak Moscow	IHL	45	8	23	31	56	—	—	—	—	—
1995–96	Eisbären Berlin	DEL	5	1	2	3	0	—	—	—	—	—
1995–96	Spartak Moscow	IHL	43	12	23	35	16	5	1	1	2	2
1996–97	Nippon Paper Cranes	JPN		9	21	30		—	—	—	—	—
1997–98	Spartak Moscow	RSL	46	13	35	48	42	4	0	3	3	6
1998–99	Spartak Moscow	RSL	41	14	28	42	28	—	—	—	—	—
1999–2000	Metallurg Novokuznetsk	RSL	38	12	34	46	10	14	2	5	7	4
2000–01	Spartak Moscow	RUS.2	32	7	26	33	4	14	2	14	16	8
2002–03	Mechel Chelyabinsk	RSL	20	3	3	6	0	—	—	—	—	—
2004–05	Velkom Moscow	RUS.3	33	6	8	14	8	—	—	—	—	—
IHL totals			173	41	98	139	128	14	1	5	6	6
RSL totals			145	42	100	142	80	18	2	8	10	10

=== International ===
Year	Team	Event	GP	G	A	Pts	PIM
1994	Russia	OG	8	0	2	2	10
