= Alexander Vinogradov (ice hockey) =

Russian ice hockey player

- Born: 28 February 1918 Moscow, Russian SFSR, Soviet Union
- Died: 10 December 1988 (aged 70) Moscow, Russian SFSR, Soviet Union
- Height: 5 ft 10 in (178 cm)
- Weight: 165 lb (75 kg; 11 st 11 lb)
- Position: Defenseman
- Shot: Left
- Played for: VVS Moscow; HC CSKA Moscow
- National team: Soviet Union
- Playing career: 1946–1955

Alexander Vinogradov
Medal record

Men's ice hockey

Representing Soviet Union

World Championships
Gold medal – first place	1954 Sweden	Team

Alexander Vinogradov (Russian: Александр Николаевич Виноградов; 28 February 1918 – 10 December 1988) was a Soviet ice hockey player.

== Career ==
Vinogradov started his career playing for CDKA Moscow in the Soviet Championship League in 1946. He joined VVS Moscow for the following season, and played for them until 1954. He rejoined CDSA Moscow for the 1954-55 season, before retiring.

He made 13 appearances for the Soviet Union national ice hockey team, winning a gold medal at the 1954 World Ice Hockey Championships held in Stockholm, Sweden.
