= Vyacheslav Bezukladnikov =

Russian ice hockey player (1968–2001)

Personal information
- Nationality: Russian
- Born: 7 September 1968 Yekaterinburg, Russian SFSR, Soviet Union
- Died: 10 July 2001 (aged 32) Sofia, Bulgaria

Sport
- Sport: Ice hockey

Vyacheslav Bezukladnikov (7 September 1968 – 10 July 2001) was a Russian ice hockey player. He competed in the men's tournament at the 1994 Winter Olympics.

== Career statistics ==
=== Regular season and playoffs ===
			Regular season					Playoffs
Season	Team	League	GP	G	A	Pts	PIM	GP	G	A	Pts	PIM
1985–86	Avtomobilist Sverdlovsk	URS.2	20	4	5	9	4	—	—	—	—	—
1986–87	Avtomobilist Sverdlovsk	URS	16	2	0	2	4	—	—	—	—	—
1986–87	SKA Sverdlovsk	URS.2	14	2	0	2	2	—	—	—	—	—
1987–88	SKA Sverdlovsk	URS.2	63	11	14	25	22	—	—	—	—	—
1988–89	SKA Sverdlovsk	URS.2	65	24	24	48	46	—	—	—	—	—
1989–90	Avtomobilist Sverdlovsk	URS	23	3	1	4	6	—	—	—	—	—
1990–91	Avtomobilist Sverdlovsk	URS	17	2	1	3	2	—	—	—	—	—
1991–92	Lada Togliatti	CIS	30	10	5	15	2	—	—	—	—	—
1992–93	Lada Togliatti	IHL	39	10	12	22	8	10	3	2	5	2
1993–94	Lada Togliatti	IHL	45	15	17	32	39	9	9	2	11	2
1994–95	Lada Togliatti	IHL	52	14	19	33	26	12	5	0	5	2
1995–96	Lada Togliatti	IHL	52	17	19	36	20	7	0	1	1	0
1996–97	Lada Togliatti	RSL	42	9	22	31	20	11	4	6	10	4
1997–98	Lada Togliatti	RSL	46	20	31	51	28	5	1	2	3	2
1998–99	Lada Togliatti	RSL	42	16	11	27	22	7	0	6	6	4
1999–2000	Lada Togliatti	RSL	36	10	7	17	39	7	2	1	3	4
2000–01	Lada Togliatti	RSL	42	3	8	11	20	4	0	0	0	0
URS/CIS totals			86	17	7	24	14	—	—	—	—	—
IHL totals			188	56	67	123	93	38	17	5	22	6
RSL totals			208	58	79	137	119	34	7	15	22	14

=== International ===
Year	Team	Event	GP	G	A	Pts	PIM
1986	Soviet Union	EJC	5	0	4	4	2
1994	Russia	OG	8	0	0	0	4
1994	Russia	WC	6	1	1	2	2
Senior totals			14	1	1	2	6

"Vyacheslav Bezukladnikov". Elite Prospects.
