= Lars Blixt (footballer, born 1965) =

Swedish footballer (born 1965)

Personal information
- Date of birth: 13 October 1965 (age 61)
- Position: Forward

Youth career
- Borrby IF

Senior career*
Years	Team	Apps	(Gls)
1986–1987	Tomelilla IF		
1988–1995	Trelleborgs FF		
1996–2000	IFK Simrishamn		
2001–2007	Borrby IF		

Managerial career
- –2007: Borrby IF (playing coach)
- 2008–2012: Branteviks IF
- 2013–2014: Österlen FF
- Borrby IF
- 2025: Tomelilla IF
- 2026–: Brösarps IF
- * Club domestic league appearances and goals

Lars Blixt (born 13 October 1965) is a Swedish former footballer who played as a forward. He played in the Allsvenskan as well as the 1994–95 UEFA Cup.

== Career ==
Blixt started his career in Borrby IF. He made his breakthrough in Tomelilla IF, where he spent two seasons, reportedly scoring 42 goals in 1987. He then joined Trelleborgs FF.

Blixt played in the second tier with Trelleborg, before the team entered the 1991 Kvalsvenskan playoff. He scored in several matches, contributing to Trelleborg winning promotion from that playoff. Trelleborg also had a good start to the 1992 Allsvenskan, being undefeated in the first four games; in a 1–0 victory over Malmö, Blixt hit a cross to Mats Lilienberg, who shot before Mikael Rasmusson scored on the rebound. In 1993, a goal in the 5–4 victory over Scanian rivals Helsingborg were among Blixt's season highlights. In both 1992 and 1993, Trelleborg finished fourth.

In 1994 Blixt lost parts of the season due to surgery. He did however play as Trelleborg eliminated Blackburn Rovers from the 1994–95 UEFA Cup, which is what he is best remembered for. After the 1995 Allsvenskan, he left Trelleborg together with other experienced players such as Mikael Rasmusson and Ola Severin; Blixt joined IFK Simrishamn.

Blixt later became playing coach for Borrby IF. After six seasons there, he spent five seasons coaching Branteviks IF until 2012. The team morphed into Österlen FF, where Blixt was succeeded by Niclas Nylén. Nylén was sacked in 2013, and Blixt returned. In 2014 he coached Österlen to promotion to the Division 2. Blixt resigned again after the 2015 season.

Blixt then had another coaching spell in Borrby IF. After trying to quit coaching, he was once again persuaded to join one of his former teams, this time Tomelilla IF. After helping that club in 2025, he agreed to coach Brösarps IF from 2026.

== Personal life ==
Blixt settled in Borrby, married and had five children. Four sons became footballers. He coached his own son Jacob (born 1996) in Österlen FF, as well as his nephew Oskar (born 1999). The twins Victor and Ludwig (born 2002) followed, and the youngest, Eric (born 2009), was touted by local press as having "a shining future".

Jacob and Victor reached Superettan during their careers, playing for Landskrona BoIS and Helsingborgs IF respectively. Victor played in the playoff where Helsingborgs IF secured promotion to the 2022 Allsvenskan, but did not get any minutes on Sweden's highest level.
