= Lars Kragh Andersen =

Danish political activist (born 1980)

- Born: 8 December 1980 (age 45)
- Other names: Licens-Lars, Hash-Lars
- Occupations: Activist, former policeman, YouTuber
- Known for: Leaking of politicians CPR-numbers, anti-government activism
- Height: 6 ft 2½ in (191 cm)
- Website: https://larskraghandersen.dk/

Andersen in 2014

Lars Kragh Andersen (born 8 December 1980), also known in the media as License-Lars, is a Danish anarcho-capitalist political activist, former policeman, internet troll, and YouTuber. He has on various occasions been fined, and both conditionally and unconditionally sentenced for violations of the Penal Code, the Firearms Act and the Personal Data Act. He has also gathered a lot of media attention.

Before he started his activism, he was in the Danish police force, and studied at A.P. Møller Mærsk, before he stopped his studies in 2005, where he instead applied at a Police Academy.

== Career as activist ==
He first gathered attention in 2010, when he wrote in a debate post, that cannabis should be legalized, and that he as a police officer wouldn't care if he caught people in possession of it. At the same time, he also accused his colleagues of enforcing the law without thinking about whether or not it was fair. The post caused a stir in the police, where the Police Association asked for an investigation. He also the same year created a Facebook page called Støt Lars' Kamp imod DR Licens, in support of people who didn't pay their license, to the Danish National Broadcast. According to DR it was illegal, and the page was closed in 2011. The page resurged in 2014, but was again closed.

In 2012, he broke the racism paragraph of the Danish Penal code, by saying that he is convinced that "muslim men around the world are raping, abusing and killing their daughters to a very large extent around the world", and received fine of 10.000 DKK. His intentions in regards to what he said are questionable, but this nevertheless made him receive some backlash. He claimed that it was his intention to break the law on purpose, claiming that it violated his right to free speech. In 2014, he leaked the CPR-numbers of numerous prominent Danish politicians, including that of Prime Minister Helle Thorning-Schmidt, and printed the numbers on T-shirts, which he sold on an internet store. He was then sentenced to 30 days of prison time, despite the efforts of his defence attorney Rasmus Paludan. He also created the illegal app Avanti, after Uber was banned in Denmark in 2017.

In 2011, Lars Kragh Andersen sold cannabis through the company "Drug Sales for Freedom". Among other things, Lars Kragh Andersen tried selling drugs with posts on the Facebook page of the Minister of Justice Morten Bødskov and the conservative legal spokesman Tom Behnke. In 2013, he was sentenced to 14 days probation for this and five other counts for which he was charged. In 2019, he gained some fame on his YouTube channel, which currently has more than 45.000 subscribers. Some of his videos were deleted because of "hate speech", as the topic of them were numerous alt-right conspiracy theories, and praised Tommy Robinson. In 2020, he reported Jeppe Kofod, the Danish Minister of Foreign Affairs, to the police for allegedly raping a 15-year-old girl.

Lars Kragh Andersen was sentenced on 20 May 2020 by the court in Lyngby to 9 months unconditional imprisonment for a number of violations of the Penal Code. This included i.a. harassment of police officers and incitement to vandalism of police automatic number plate recognition systems (ANPR systems). He was also convicted for several cases of violations of the Firearms Act, including having hunting cartridges which were not stored properly, and for the possession of several club alike weapons. In addition to the prison sentence, he was sentenced to pay almost 183.000 DKK in compensation to the National Police and the Danish Road Directorate. Lars Kragh Andersen decided not to appeal the verdict, but the Public Prosecutor's Office chose to have the case tried in the Eastern High Court.

In April 2021, he was again arrested, this time for leaking the CPR-number of the current Prime Minister Mette Frederiksen, as well as other ministers on social media, though he was acquitted later.
