= Lars Blixt (footballer, born 1976) =

Norwegian footballer (born 1976)

Personal information
- Date of birth: 8 October 1976 (age 50)
- Position: Defender

Youth career
- Trysilgutten

Senior career*
Years	Team	Apps	(Gls)
–1998	Nybergsund		
1999	Skjetten	25	(2)
2000	Nybergsund		
2001–2004	Rosenborg	15	(0)
2004	→ Sogndal (loan)	10	(0)
2005–2006	Fredrikstad	16	(1)
- * Club domestic league appearances and goals

Lars Blixt (born 8 October 1976) is a retired Norwegian football defender.

Hailing from Trysil Municipality, he played for local teams Trysilgutten IL and Nybergsund until being scouted by Skjetten. He signed for them in 1999 to play 1. divisjon football.

Returning to Nybergsund in 2000, he now played so well that Norway's leading team Rosenborg BK signed him. After 15 league games and 11 cup games in Rosenborg, he was loaned out to Sogndal in late 2004—Rosenborg had previously bought Sogndal's Robbie Russell to cover for the soon-to-be-gone Blixt. After the 2004 season Blixt was released.

He stayed on the first tier with Fredrikstad FK, even scoring the only goal in an away match against Rosenborg in April 2005, but after a lacklustre first half of the 2006 season he was released.

His sons Jacob (born 1996) and Victor (born 2002) are both footballers playing for Österlen FF.
