= Lars Larsen (disambiguation) =

Lars Larsen may refer to:

- Lars Larsen (timber merchant) (1737–1817), Danish timber merchant, bank manager etx
- Lars Larsen (1758–1844), Danish merchant, ship-owner and shipbuilder
- Lars Larsen (1948–2019), Danish entrepreneur and founder of the Jysk retail chain.
- Lars Larsen (footballer, born 1951), Danish former footballer
- Lars Larsen (footballer, born 1978), Danish footballer for Randers FC
- Lars Larsen (footballer, born 1970), Danish footballer for Örebro SK
- Lars Olden Larsen (born 1998), Norwegian football midfielder
- Lars Holme Larsen, Danish designer

== See also ==
- Lars Larson (born 1959), American conservative talk radio show host
- Lars Larsson (disambiguation)
