= Gothersgade 56 =

Building in Copenhagen

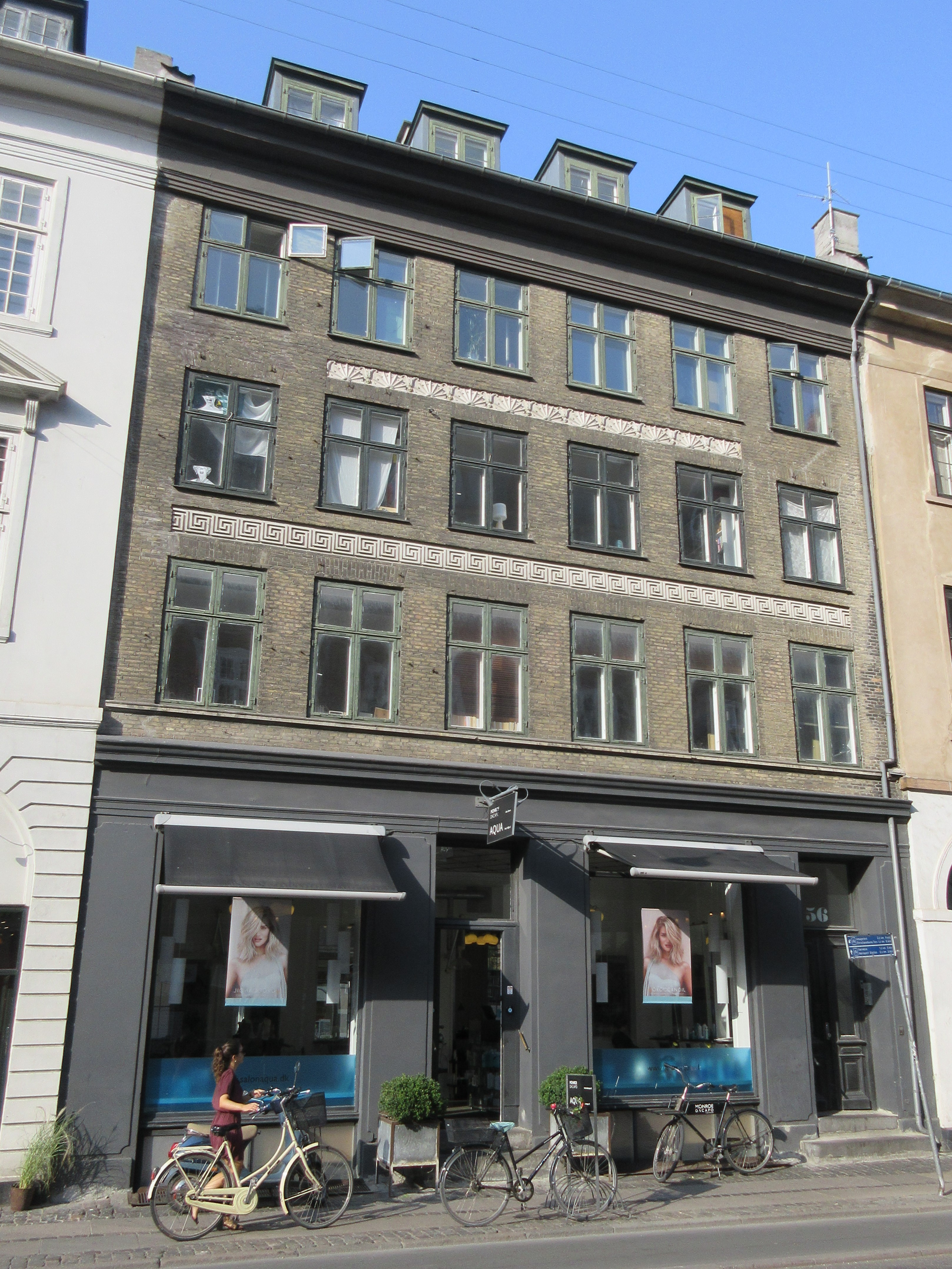
- Interactive map of the Gothersgade 56 area

General information
- Architectural style: Neoclassical
- Location: Copenhagen, Denmark
- Coordinates: 55°40′57.5″N 12°34′52.39″E
- Completed: 1802

Gothersgade 56 os a Neoclassical property situated on Gothersgade, close to Rosenborg Castle Garden, in central Copenhagen, Denmark. It was listed in the Danish registry of protected buildings and places in 1918.

== History ==
The Lars Larsen House was constructed for shipbuilder Lars Larsen in 1801. In 1802, he used the garden for the construction of a new building. In the cadastre of 1806, Larsen's new building was listed as No. 2 in St. Ann's West Quarter.

At the time of the 1840 census, No. 2 was home to a total of seven households. Andreas Andresen Balslev, a master shoemaker, resided on the ground floor with his two sons (aged 21 and 22), a foster daughter (aged 19), one maid, one shoemaker and two shoemaker's apprentices. Birthe Belmann, a midwife, was also residing on the ground floor with two maids. Lars Madsen, who ran a boarding house for joiner's apprentices, resided on the first floor with his wife Sidse Kirstine Jørgensen, their four children (aged two to ten) and two maids. Christine Marie Nielsen, a 54-year-old widow, resided on the second floor with two unmarried seamstresses. Marie Falkenberg, a 42-year-old widow, resided on the second floor with her ten-year-old son Hans Christian Falkenberg, her 40-year-old sister Lovise Møller and one maid. Lauritz Niels Pagh, a captain in the Danish Admiralty, resided on the third floor. Frederik Meyer, a master shoemaker, resided in the basement with his wife Charlotte Meyer (née Meyer), their two children (aged 21 and 28) and one maid.

By 1845, Birthe Belman had taken over the third floor apartment. Marie Signiette Falkenberg was still residing on the second floor. She was now operating a boarding home on the site. Charlotte Theodore Kierulff was now operating another boarding home on the ground floor.

At the time of the 1860 census, No. 2 was still home to just four households. Dorothea Paulli, the widow of an overkrigskommisær, resided in the building with her 30-year-old daughter Camilla Paulli and one maid. Charlotte Theodora Kierulff and Marie Signette Falkenberg were still residing in two of the other apartments. Nicolai Hansen, a rådstuebetjent, resided in the fourth apartment with his wife Dorothea Magdalene Hansen, their two children and one maid.

== Architecture ==
The building is six bays wide and was originally constructed with four storeys above a walk-out basement. The basement was removed when the ground floor was converted into a retail space in 1782. The facade is on the ground floor plastered and painted in a grey colour. The undressed upper part of the facade is finished with a sill course below the first floor windows and a grey-painted cornice. It is decorated with a Meander frieze between the windows of the first and second floors and another frieze between the four central windows of the second and third floors. The main entrance in the bay furthest to the left is raised two steps from the street. It opens into a through-going anteroom, which provides access to the principal staircase as well as to the courtyard on the rear. The entrance to the shop in the ground floor is in the third bay from the left. The roof is clad in slate and features four dormer windows towards the street and one dormer window towards the courtyard.

== Today ==
The property is owned today by E/F Gothersgade 56 and comprises one condominium on each floor.

== See also ==
- Kronprinsessegade
