= Lars Larsson =

Lars Larsson may refer to:

- Lars Larsson (racing driver) (born 1965), double European Rallycross Champion from Sweden
- Lars Larsson (archaeologist) (born 1947), chair of prehistoric archaeology at Lund University in Sweden
- Lars Larsson (footballer) (1962–2015), Swedish footballer
- Lars Larsson (musician), with Arvingarna
- Lars Larsson (athlete) (1911–1993), Swedish athlete
- Lars Larsson (rower) (1911-1991), Swedish Olympic rower
- Lars Gunnar Larsson (born 1940), Swedish nuclear safety expert
- Lars Mejern Larsson (born 1965), Swedish social democratic politician
- Lars Larsson Eldstierna (1626–1701), baron of Ostrogothia, son of Lars Gustafsson Vasa and Brita Törnros
- Lars Larsson i Lotorp, Swedish politician

== See also ==
- Lars Larsen (disambiguation)
- Lars-Erik Larsson (1908–1986), Swedish composer
- Lars Larson (born 1959), American conservative talk radio show host
