= Jysk (disambiguation) =

Jysk is the Danish word for Jutlandic or Jutish:

- Jutland, the western peninsula of Denmark
- Jutlandic or Jutish, its dialect
- Jutes, a historic Germanic tribe migrating from Jutland to England

Jysk in company names may refer to:

- JYSK, a Danish household goods retail chain
- Jysk Supermarket, later Danish Supermarket, part of Salling Group
- JYSK Arena, a complex of indoor sports arenas in Silkeborg, Denmark
- JYSK Park, a football stadium in Silkeborg, Denmark
- Jyske Bank, a Danish bank
