= Lars Larsen (timber merchant) =

Danish timber mercha

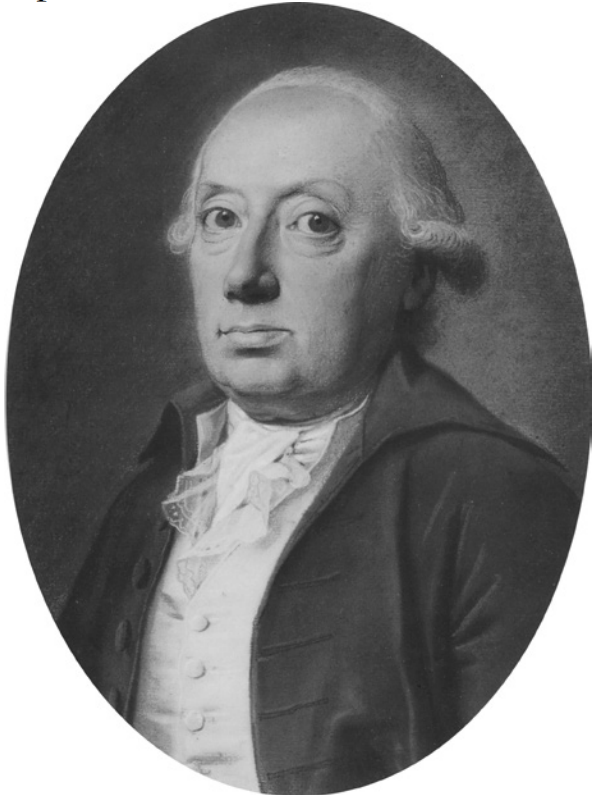
Lars Larsen.

Lars Larsen (1737–1817) was a Danish timber merchant and ship-owner. He also served as one of the directors of Kjøbenhavns Brandforsikring and the Danish–Norwegian Species Bank and as one of Copenhagen's 32 Men. He owned the property Nyhavn 63 as well as the country house Søholt in Østerbro. He should not be confused with the somewhat younger ship builder Lars Larsen, namesake of the Lars Larsen House and Larsens Plads.

== Early life and education ==
Lars Larsen was born at Elmelunde on the island of Møn, the son of Knud Christensen (1698–1757) and Karen Pedersdatter (1710–1750). He changed his last name after joining his maternal uncle Jens Larsen in Copenhagen. The uncle was the owner of a successful timber business. He owned the property Nyhavn 63.

== Career ==
Lars Larsen joined his uncle's timber business and was eventually himself licensed as a wholesale merchant (grosserer) in 1770. He inherited the uncle's property and firm after his death. By 1787, Larsen owned a fleet of 14 ships. He served as one of the directors of Kjøbenhavns Brandforsikring in 1787–93 and as one of the bank managers of the Danish-Norwegian Species Bank in 1791. He became a member of the Council of 32 Men in 1772.

== Personal life ==
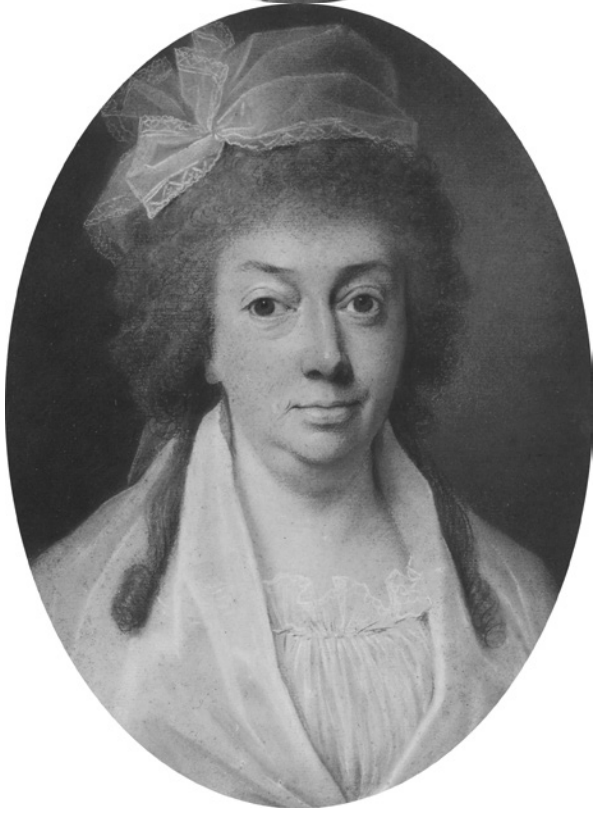
Charlotte Frederikk Larsen, née Drewsen.

On 14 May 1766, Larsen married Charlotte Frederikke Drewsen. She was the daughter of paper manufacturer Johan Drewsen (1715–1796) and Johan Drewsen (1715–1796). Their only child was the daughter Johanne Margrethe Larsen (1777–1854). In 1796, she was married to Johannes Søbøtker.

Lars Larsen and his family resided in the building Nyhavn 63. He also owned the country house Søjolt in Østerbro (Østerbro No. 105). It was located at the northern end of Sortedam Lake. In 1913, Larsen sold Søholt to Peter von Scholten.
