= Jacob Brunsborg =

Danish businessman

- Born: 26 May 1972 (age 53)
- Occupation: Businessman
- Title: Chairman, Jysk
- Term: June 2019-
- Predecessor: Lars Larsen
- Parent: Lars Larsen

Jacob Brunsborg (born 26 May 1972) is a Danish businessman, and the chairman of the Danish retail chain Jysk, founded by his father, Lars Larsen.

In June 2019, Brunsborg succeeded his father, Lars Larsen, as chairman of Jysk, due to Larsen's diagnosis with terminal liver cancer.
