= Lars Larsson Eldstierna =

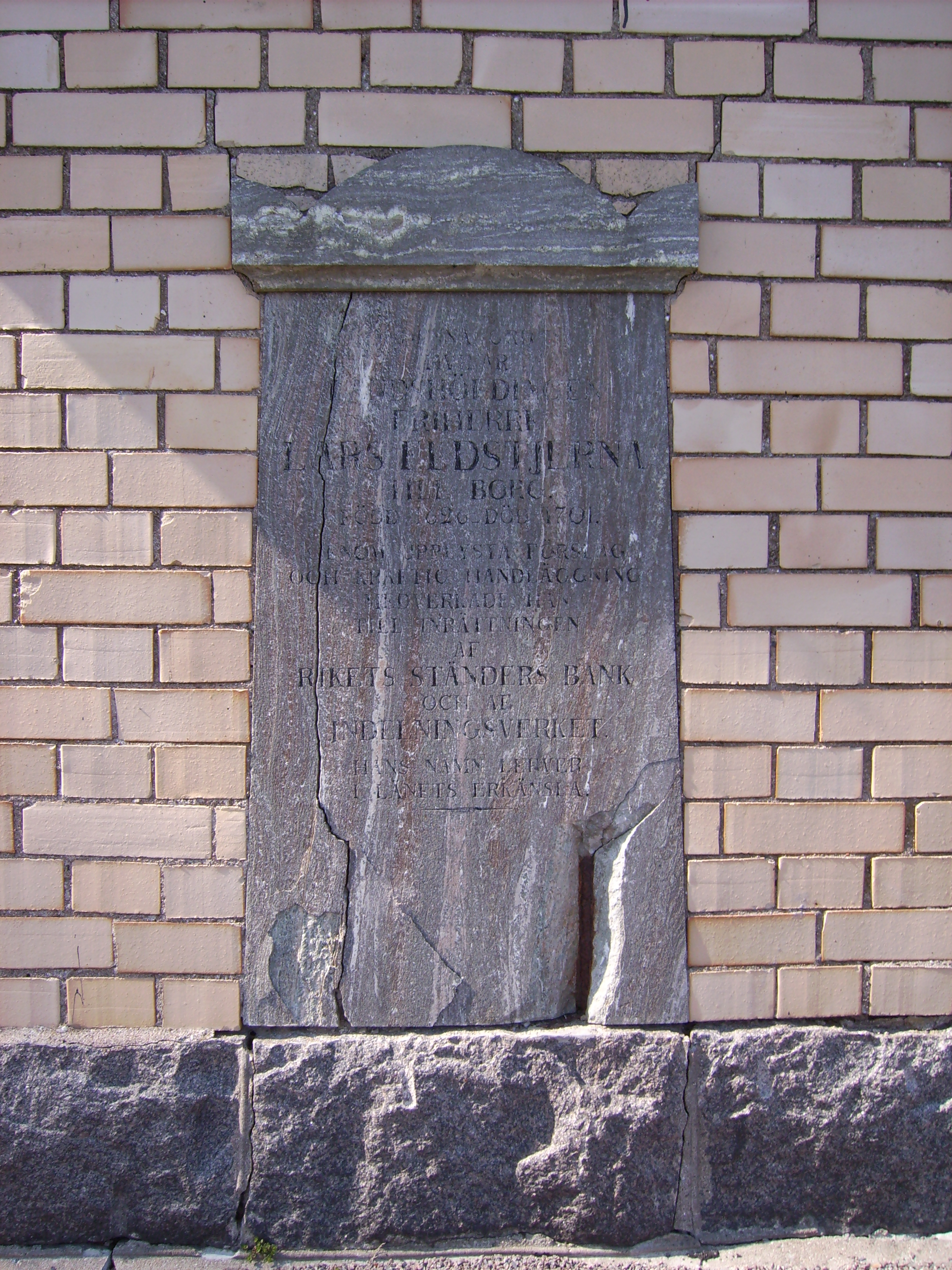
Grave of Lars Eldstierna.

Lars Larsson Eldstierna (originally Eld) (c. 1623–1701) was a Swedish landshövding (governor) and the founder of the noble family of Eldstierna.

Lars Larsson Eld was the son of a vogt at Händelö named Lars (died 1657), whose possible patronym might have been Björnsson. Lars Larsson Eld was made a nobleman in 1662, being given the name Eldstierna. In 1691 he was raised further to baronage. He died as landshövding of Östergötland County.

Lars Larsson Eldstierna's younger brother, Samuel Larsson Eld (1637–1716), was also ennobled, but under the name of Stierneld.

== Older false genealogy ==
During most of the 19th century Lars Larsson Eldstierna was believed to be of royal blood, being a grandson of the exiled Prince Gustav of Sweden through Lars Gustafsson Vasa and Brita Törnros. This genealogy was however based on false documents presented by the notorious forger Adolf Ludvig Stierneld (1755–1835) and have later been completely refuted by several historians and genealogists including Gustaf Elgenstierna and Bengt Hildebrand. The Swedish House of Nobility dropped the references to the royal descent in their publications at the beginning of the 20th century.

== Sources ==
- Gustaf Elgenstierna: Svenska adelns ättartavlor, vol. VII (Stockholm 1932)
- Bengt Hildebrand: "Eldstierna" in Svenskt biografiskt lexikon, vol. XIII (Stockholm 1950)
