= Nyhavn 63 =

Historic building in Copenhagen, Denmark

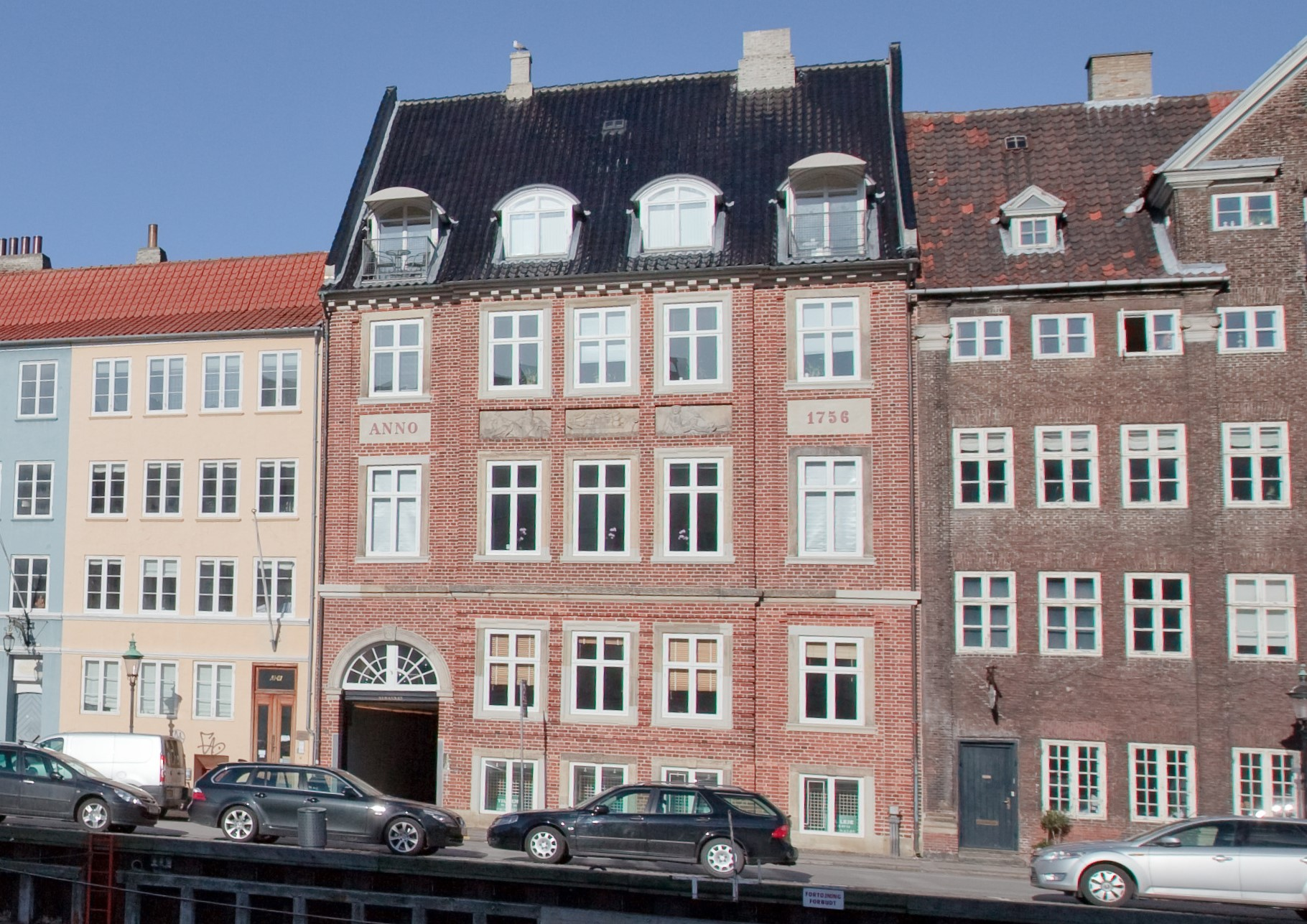
- The house seen from the other side of the canal
- Interactive map of the Nyhavn 63 area

General information
- Location: Copenhagen, Denmark, Europe
- Coordinates: 55°40′46.77″N 12°35′33.17″E
- Completed: 1756

Nyhavn 63 is a historic townhouse overlooking the Nyhavn Canal in central Copenhagen, Denmark. The building was listed on the Danish Registry of Protected Buildings and Places in 1918. A warehouse in the courtyard has been converted into a hostel.

== History ==
=== Site history, 1689–1756 ===
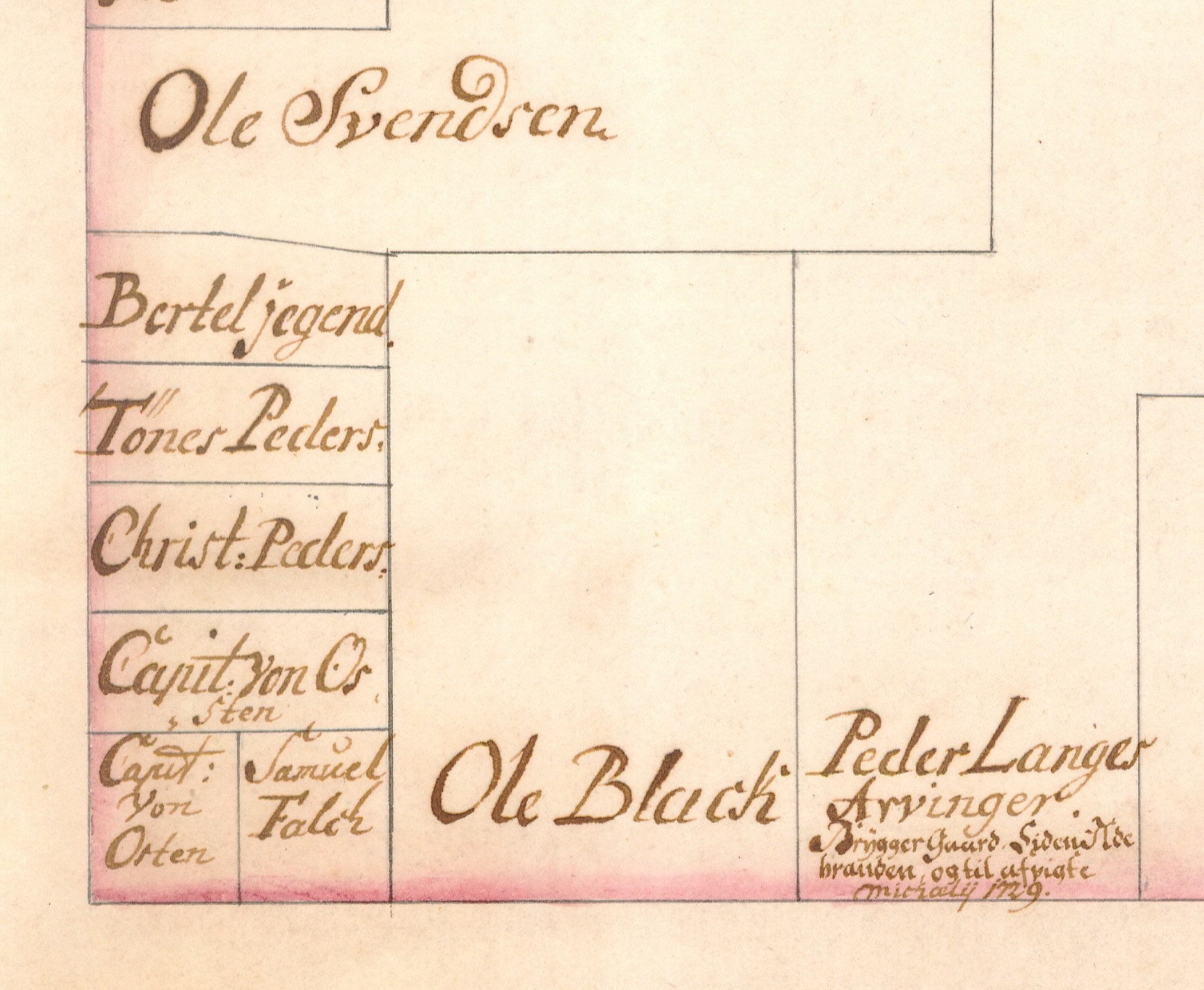
Ole Svendsen's property seen on a plan from 1731

Thecoppersmith Henrik Ehm purchased a large property at the site in 1682, comprising all the properties now known as Nyhavn59–69 and Kvæsthusgade 2–4. His property was listed in Copenhagen's first cadastre of 1689 as No. 20 in St. Ann's East Quarter. The property was later divided into a number of smaller properties. The property now known as Nyhavn 63 belonged to one Ole Svendsen in 1731.

=== Larsen family ===
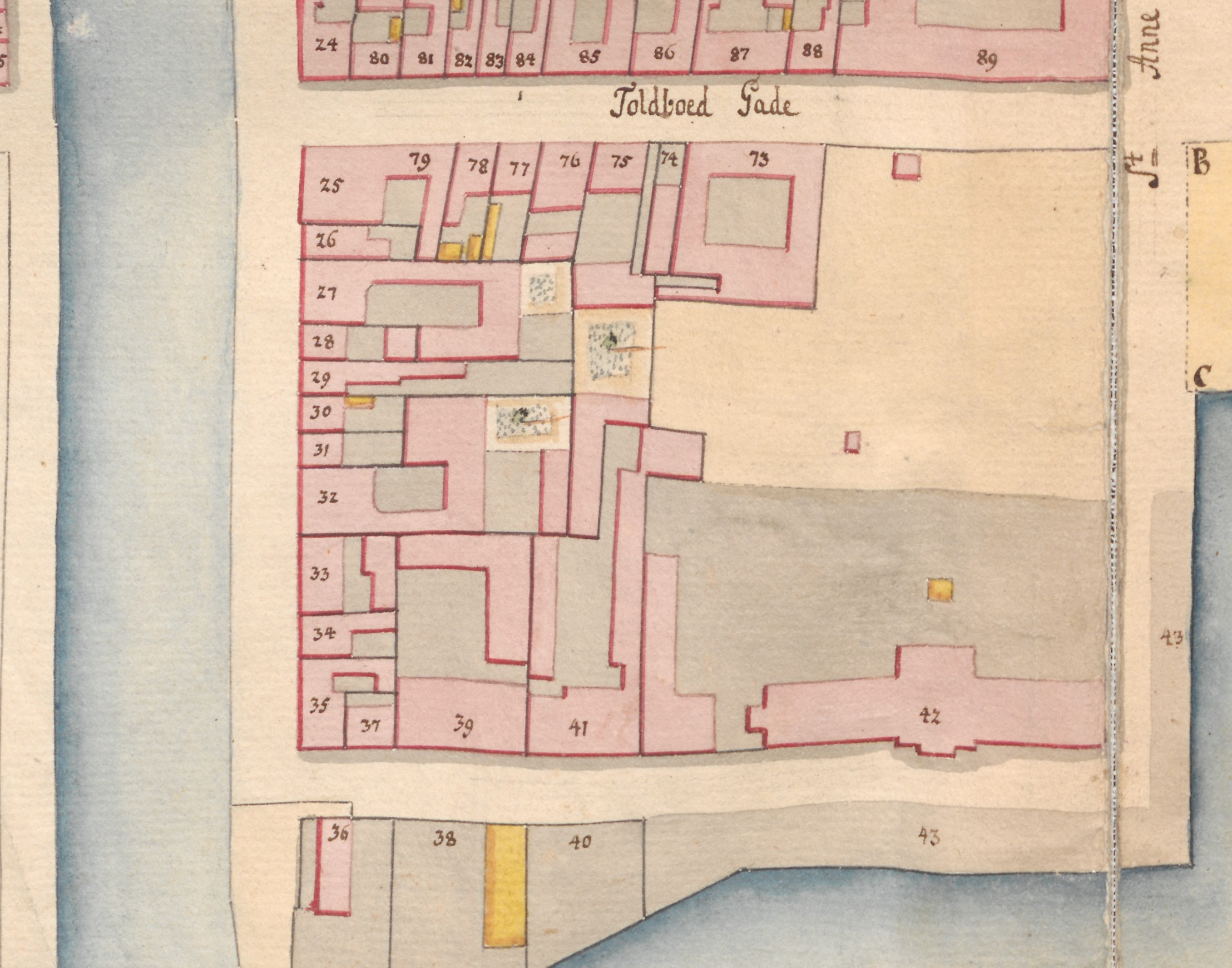
No. 32 seen in a detail from Christian Gedde's map of St. Ann's East Quarter, 1757

In 1750, the property was acquired by timber merchant Jens Larsen. His property was listed in the new cadastre of 1756 as No. 32 in St. Ann's East Quarter. The present building on the site was constructed for Larsen in 1756.

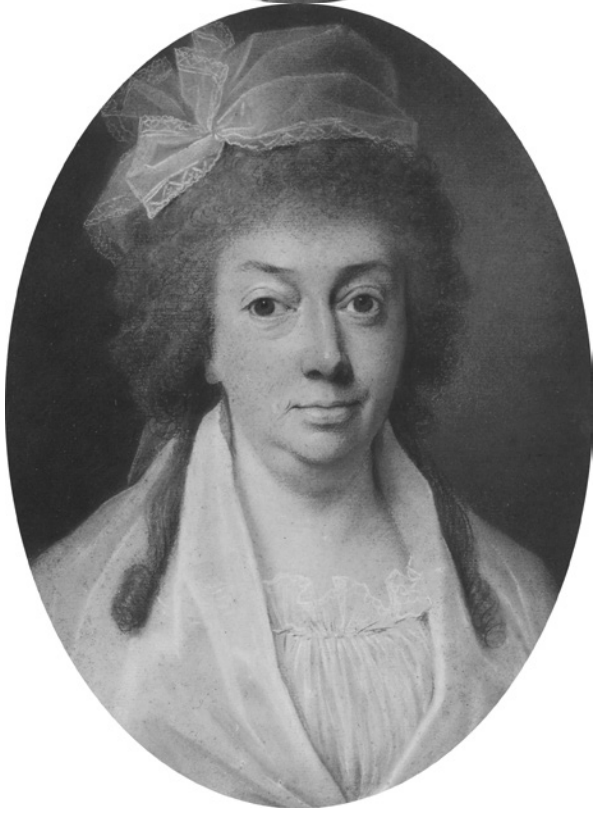
Charlotte Frederikke Larsen, née Drewsen

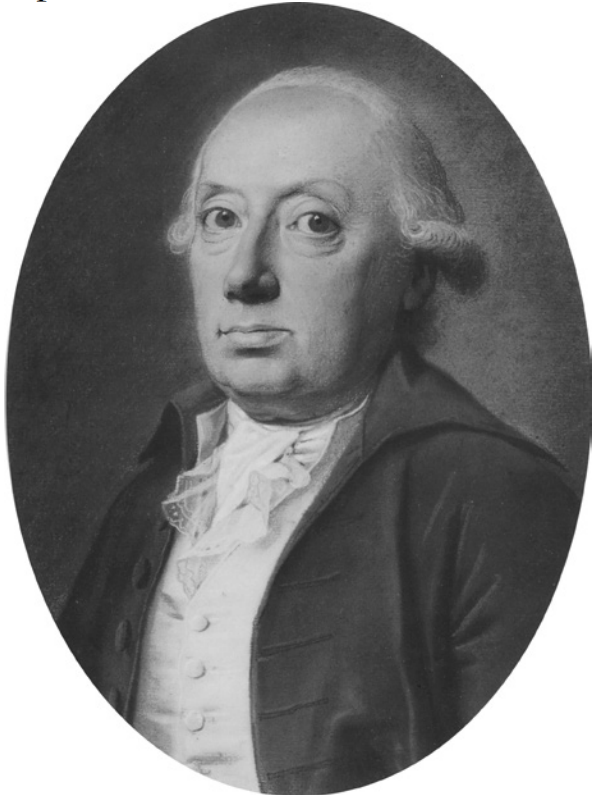
Lars Larsen

The property was after Jens Larsen's death passed to his nephew Lars Larsen. At the time of the 1787 census, he lived there with his wife Charlotte Friederiche, their 10-year-old daughter Mette Magrethe, the 53-year-old woman Mette Cathrine Bræmer, the 53-year-old widower Wibecke Cathrine Fuscher, the clerk Carl Ludwig Drewsen, a servant, a coachman, a caretaker, a housekeeper and three maids. At the time of the 1787 census, No. 32 was also home to two more households.

Wilhelm Laub (1734–1800), Krigsråd and pakhusskriver at the Custom House, resided in the building with his wife Sophie Kisbye, their three children (aged 11 to 18), two maids and a caretaker. The eldest of the three children, Hieronymus Laub (1771–1848), would later become a prominent clergyman. The third household consisted of the beer seller (øltapper) Niels Hiorth and his wife Anna Christians Datter.

At the time of the 1801 census, Lars Larsen resided in the building with his daughter Johanne M. Larsen, his son-in-law Johannes Søbøtker, their two children (aged two and three) and a large staff. All included, the household comprised 21 people. The property was also home to one other household, consisting of beer seller (øltapper) Knud Pedersen, his wife Kirstine Hoskiær and one maid. In the new cadastre of 1806, Larsen's property was again listed as No. 32 in St. Ann's East Quarter. Larsen kept the property until his death in 1817.

=== Petersen family, 1818–1900 ===
In 1818 the building was acquired by the businessman Friderich Petersen. Petersen's property was home to three households at the 1834 census. The owner resided on the second floor with his wife C.W.Petersen, their three children (aged eight to 21), two office clerks in his firm, two male servants and one maid. J. H. Sieveking, a 50-year-old unmarried merchant (grosserer) and consul-general, resided in the building with three employees (two of them married). Fritz Iversen, a sailor, resided in the basement with his wife Johanne Iversen and a maid.

From 1845 to 1846, the church historian P. F. A. Hammerich lived in the building while working at Trinitatis Church. In 1870, August Bournonville lived on the second floor.

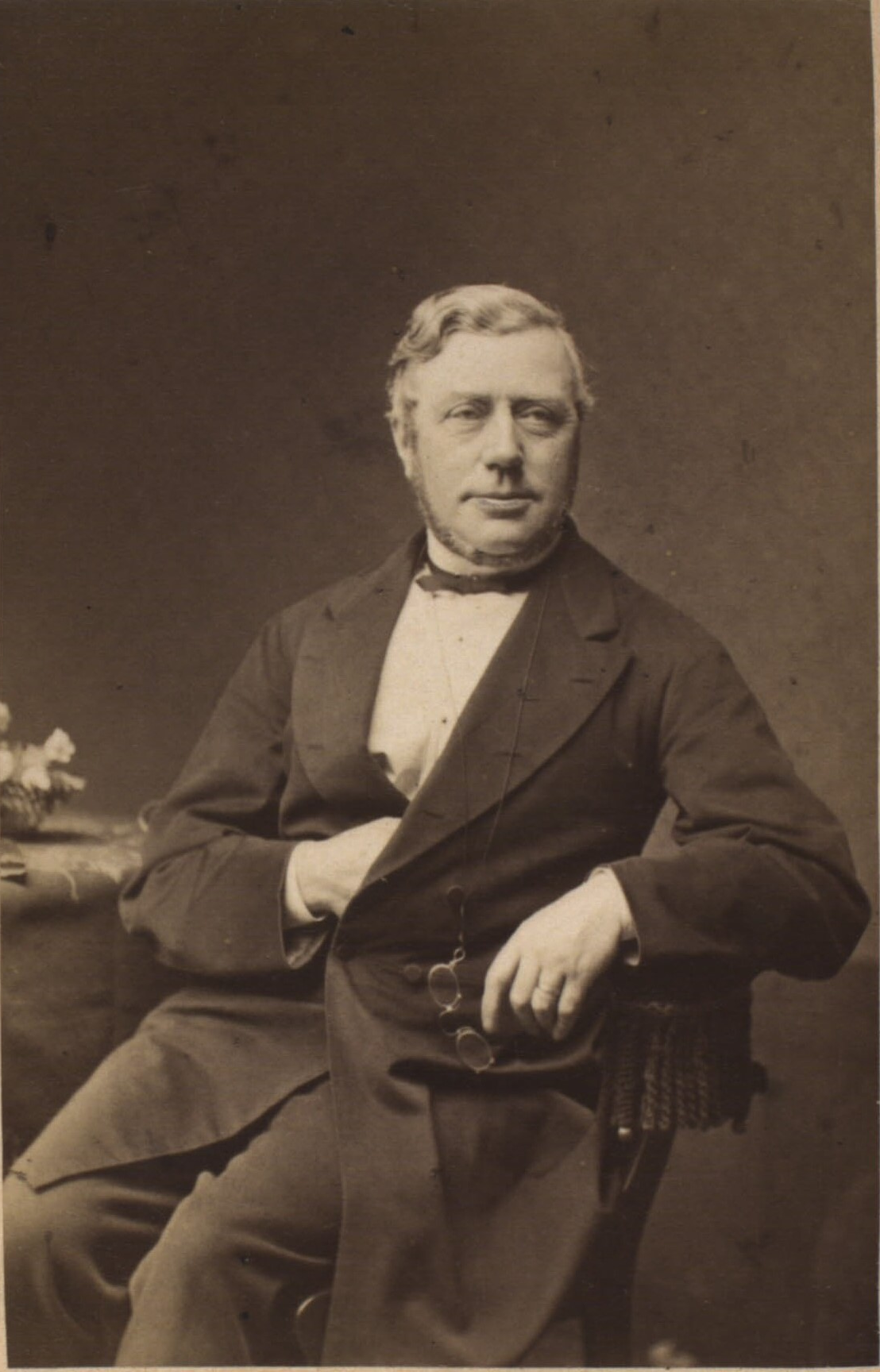
Georg Petersen

Friedrich Erasmi Petersen died in 1864. The firm was then passed to his son Georg Petersen (1820–1900). The property was also passed to him.

Georg Petersen's property was home to 20 residents at the 1880 census. The owner resided on the first floor with his wife Caroline Petersen, three maids, one male servant and a coachman. The writer Wilhelm Bergsøe resided on the second floor with his wife Margrethe Kirstine Bergsøe, their seven-year-old son Poul Bergsøe, a maid and a female cook. Johan Thomsen, a 69-year-old man with a royal pension, resided on the ground floor with his wife Emma Mathilde Thomsen, their 35-year-old daughter Laura Augusta Mathilde Thomsen, and one maid. Jacob Andersen, a concierge, resided in the basement with his wife Kirsten Andersen, their four-year-old son and the caretaker Anders Jørgensen.

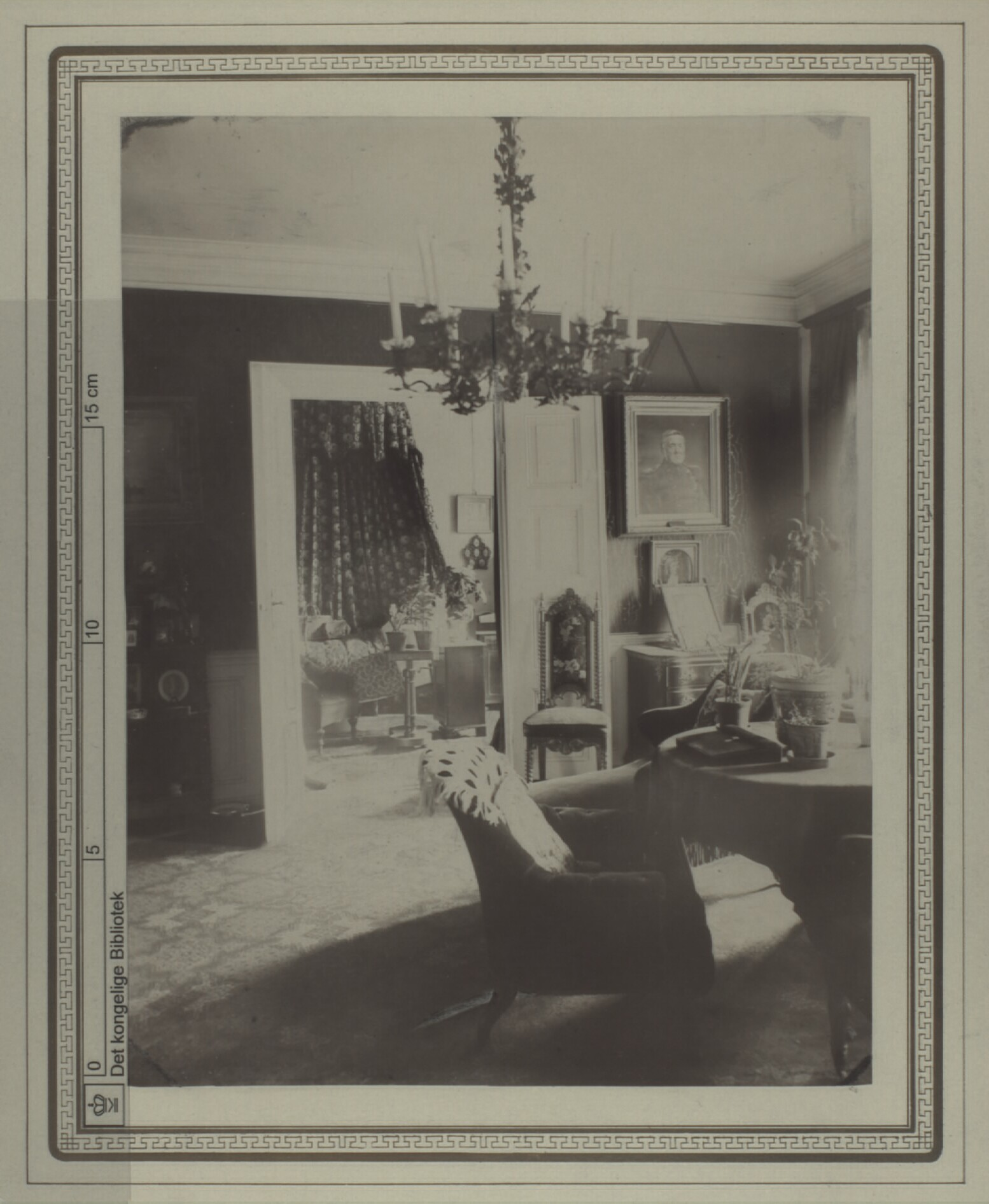
Bille's living room

From 1886 to 1891, Vilhelm Bergsøe again resided on the second floor. His son Paul Bergsøe's memoirs Tre små vinduer (Three Small Windows) describe his childhood home in Nyhavn. In the 1880s and 1890s, royal actor Poul Reumert grew up in the building as the son of actor Elith Reumert and dancer Athalia Reumert.

After her husband's death, Caroline Bille (née Bülow), widow of admiral Steen Andersen Bille, was a resident of the building.

=== 20th century ===
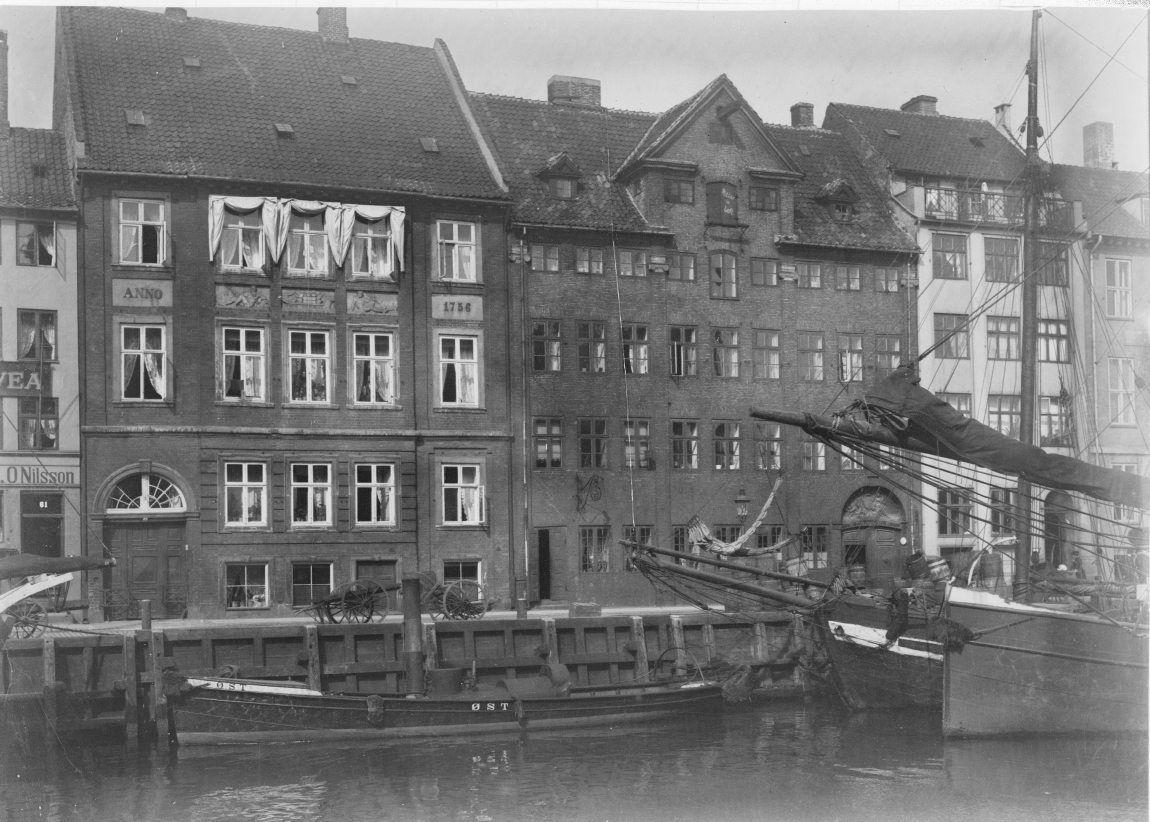
The building in the 1900s

By sales contract of 11 April 1901, Nyhavn 63 was sold to the company Henriques & Zøylner (deed: 11 June 1901). By 1950, Henriques & Zøylner's Eftf. was still based in the building. The company was founded by Gustav Aron Henriques (1859–1939) and C. Zøylner (1875–1937) on 1 September 1900. The engineer Jørgen Koch resided in one of the apartments in the 1940s.

In 1910, Ørum & Wulf was also based in the building. The company was founded on 13 September 1795 by N. N. Ørumin in partnership with a young merchant, Jens Andreas, but it is unclear when it moved to Nyhavn. The company would close in 1912.

From 1950 to 1988, the Maritime Library (Danish: Søfartens Bibliotek) was based in the building. It had been founded by the shipping company J. Lauritzen in 1939. The company is now located in Rødovre.

== Architecture ==
The building consists of three stories over a high cellar. The dormers in the roof were not added until 1942. The facade stands in undressed brick and features three stone reliefs between the first and second floor that commemorate the trade of the property's first owner. The one in the middle features a barge with timber. It is flanked by Neptune with his trident and Mercury with his winged hat, the gods of the sea and trade.

A gateway in the left side of the building opens to a courtyard surrounded by buildings. To the right is a five bay side wing in three storeys. It was built in two storeys between 1748 and 1756 and heightened with one story before 1801. The three floor high and four bays wide rear wing was also built between 1748 and 1756. There is also a three-story, half-timbered warehouse from before 1756.

== Today ==
As of 2018, a hostel is located in the rear wing and the side wing houses a restaurant.

== Gallery ==
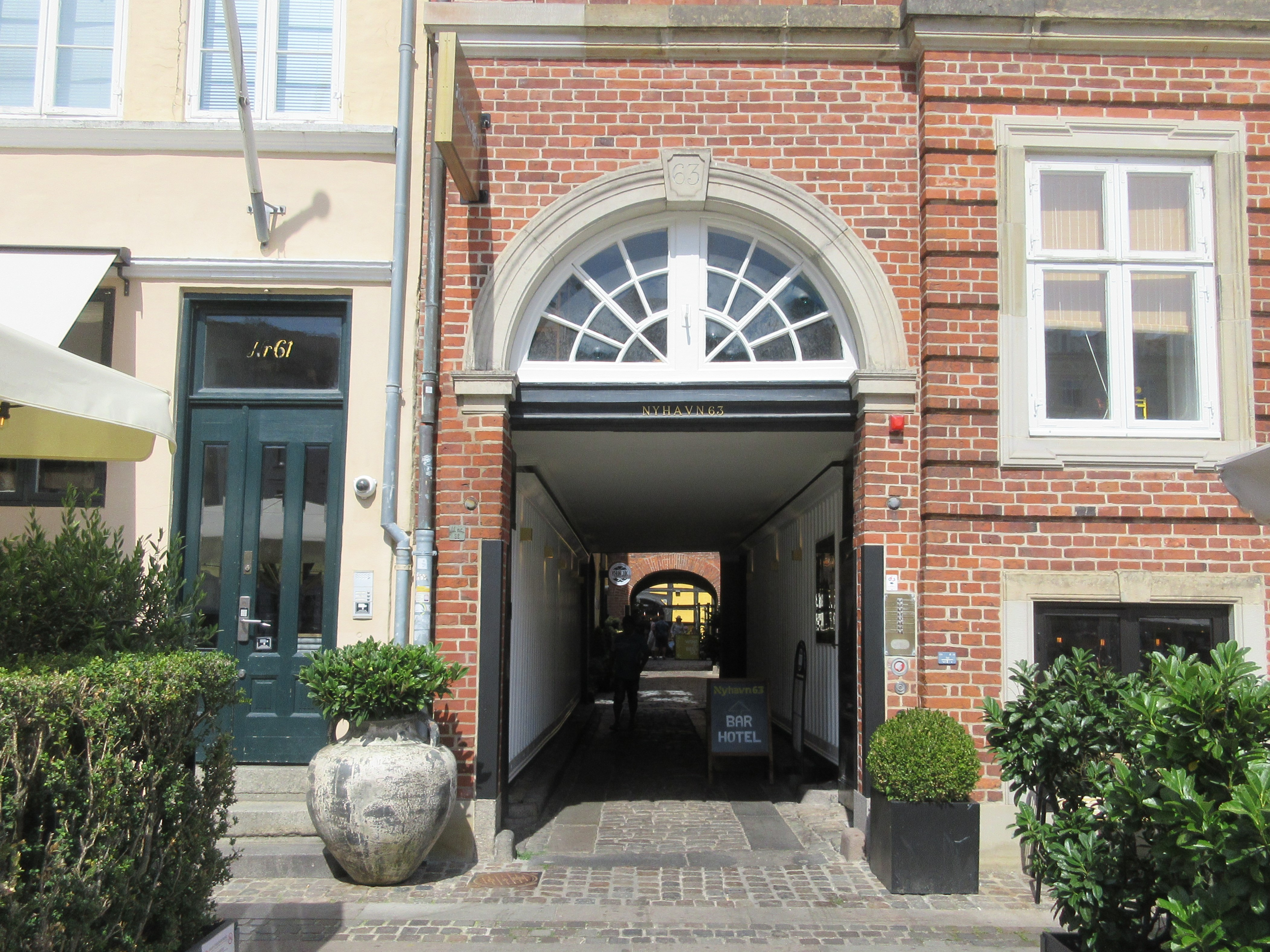
The gateway viewed from the street

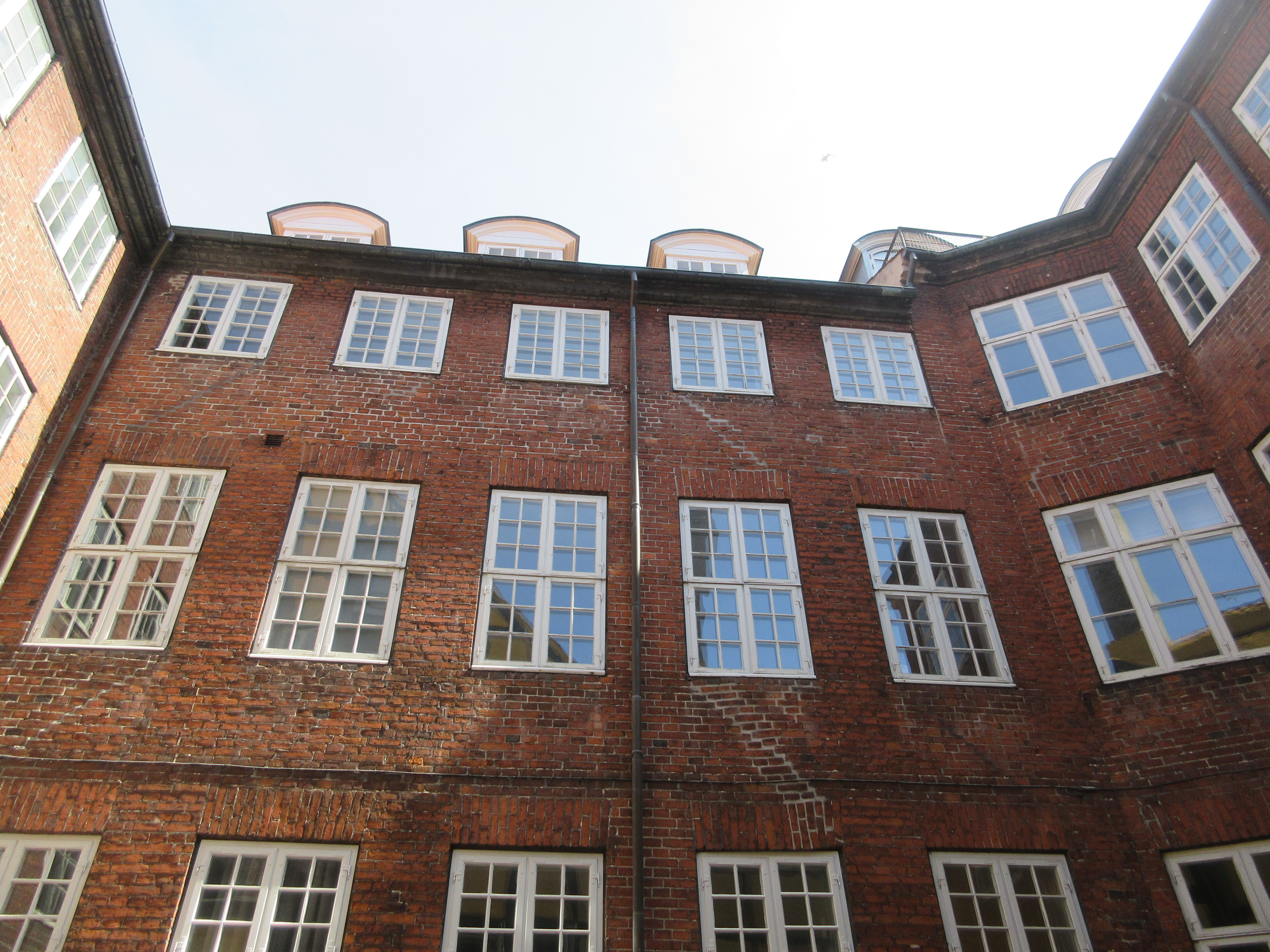
The side wing viewed from the first courtyard

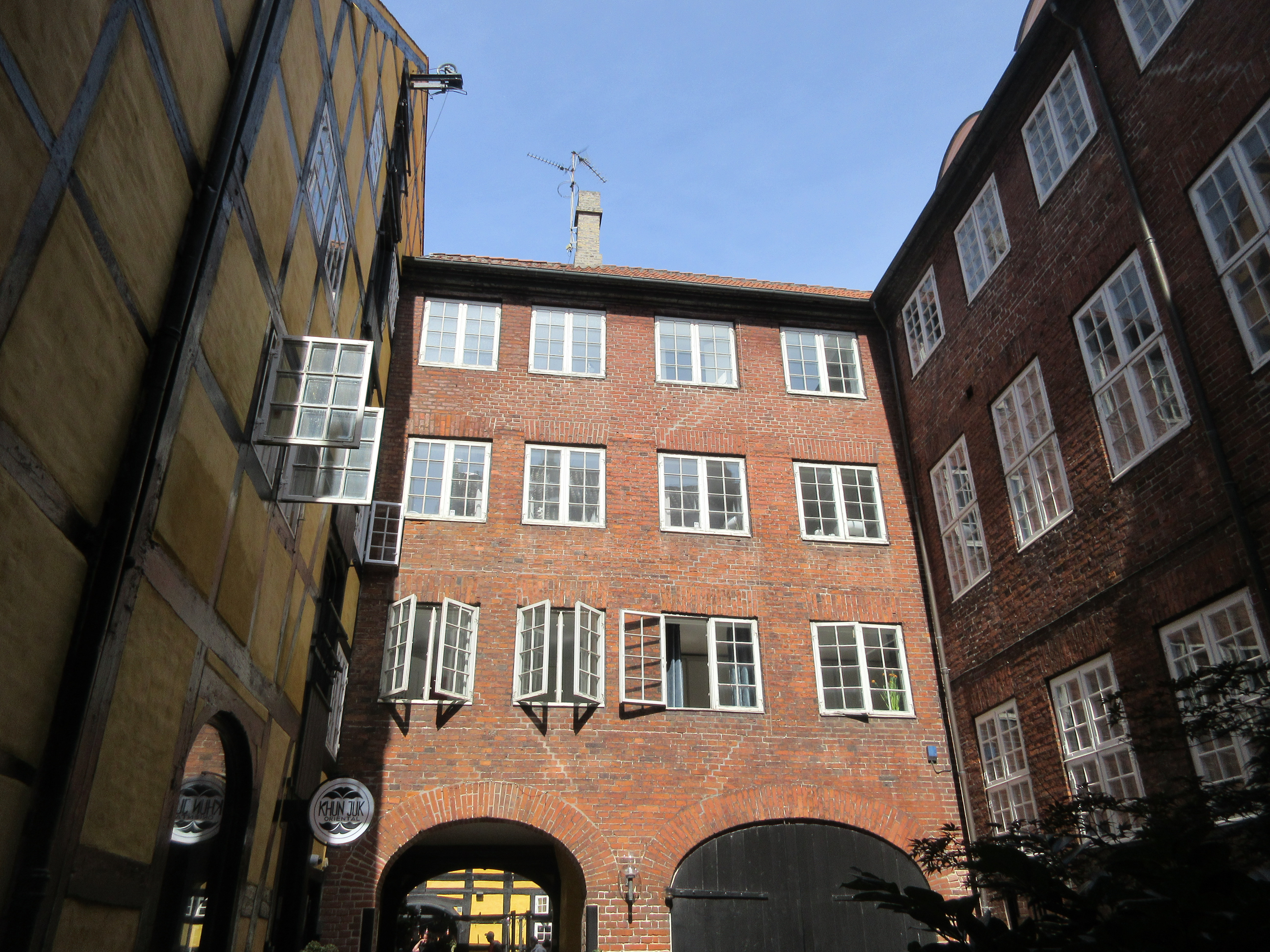
The wing separating the two courtyards from each other, viewed from the first courtyard

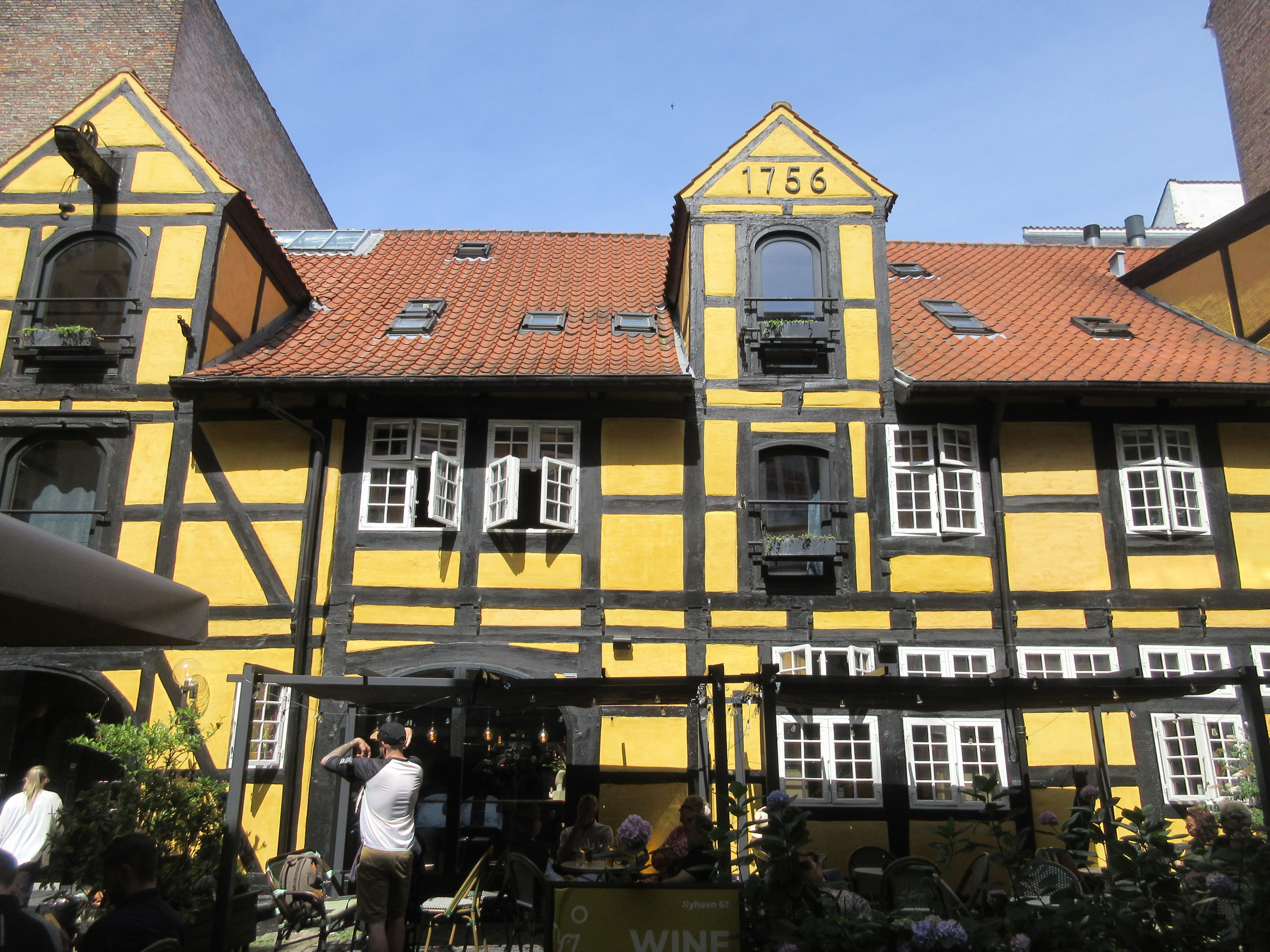
The rear wing in the second courtyard

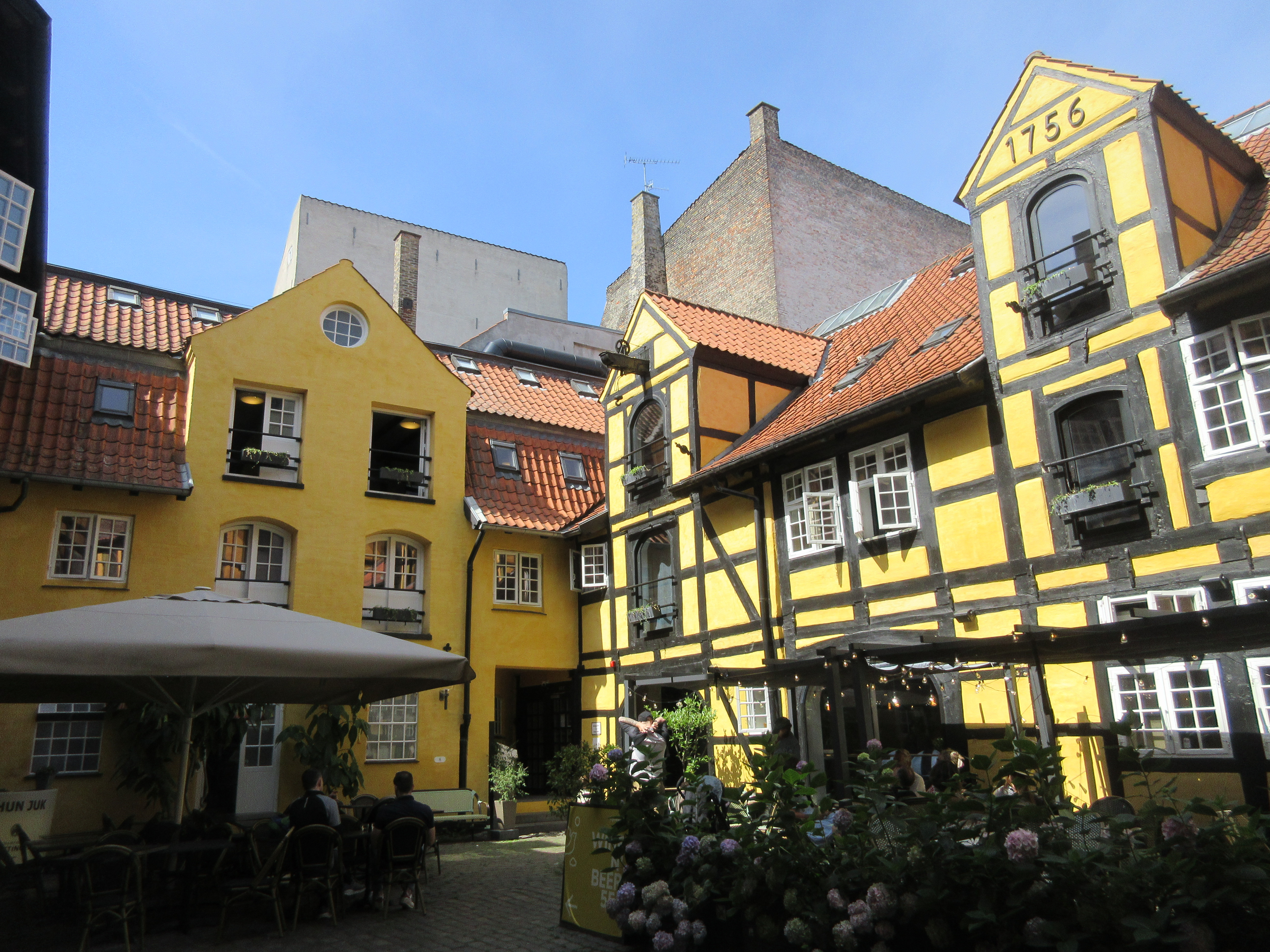
The rear wing (right) and side wing (left) in the second courtyard
