= Georg Petersen =

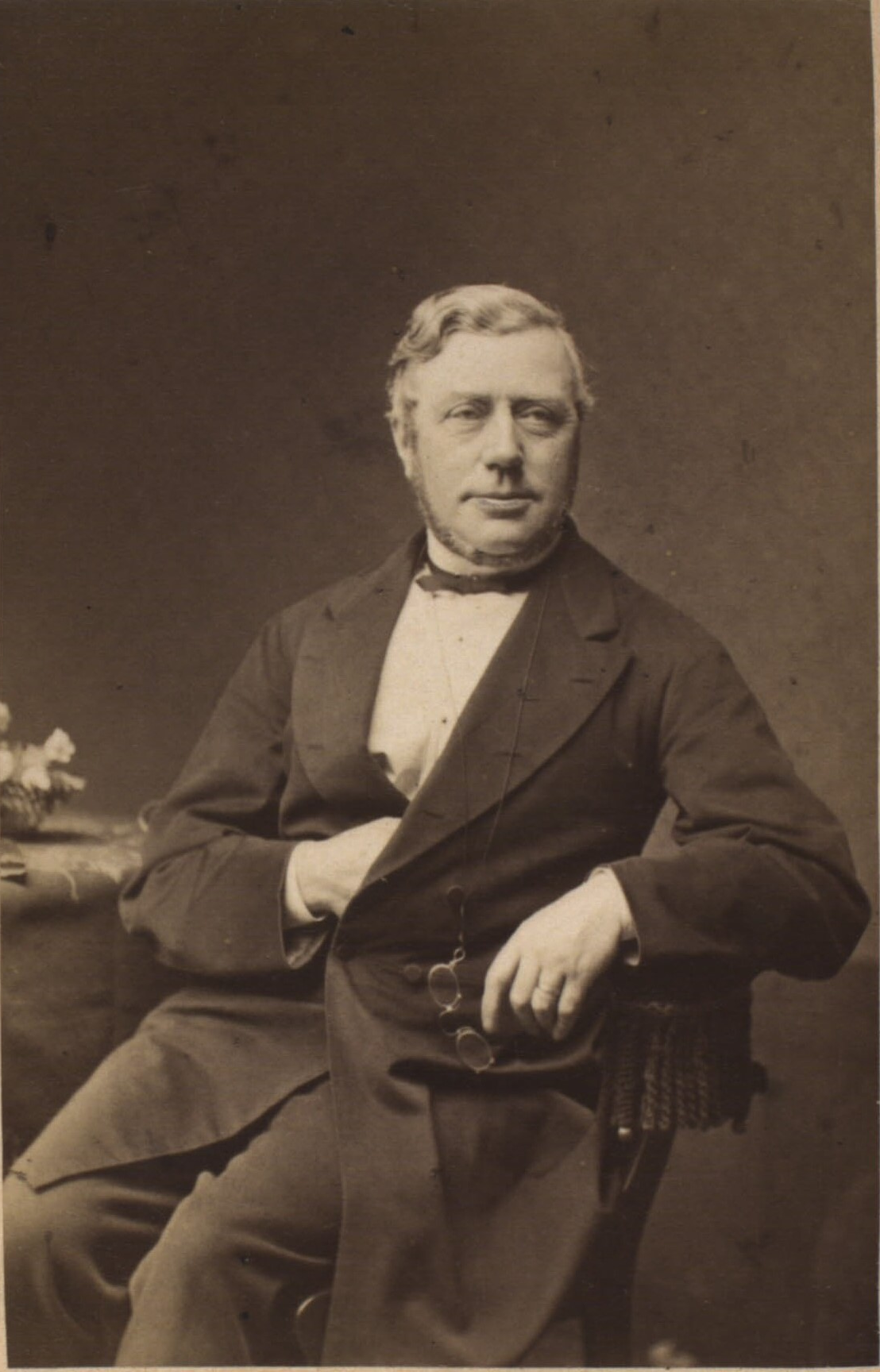
Georg Petersen

Georg Petersen (2 October 1820 – 20 December 1900) was a Danish businessman. He owned the building at Nyhavn 63 in Copenhagen.

== Early life and education ==
Petersen was born on 2 October 1820, the son of wholesale merchant Friedrich Erasmi Petersen (1783–1864) and Wilhelmine Caroline Langreuter (1787–1848). His father had bought the property Nyhavn 63 in 1817. The family belonged to the city's German congregation at St. Peter's Church. Petersen received a good commercial education in his father's firm F. P. Petersen as well as in a large trading firm in Hamburg.

== Career ==
Petersen was created a partner in his father's firm in 1846. In 1864, he became its sole owner. The firm traded in grain, Swedish iron and products from Iceland. It was one of the most respected of its kind in Copenhagen. In 1860, Petersen was elected for Privatbanken's bank council. In 1886, he succeeded Christian August Broberg as its chairman. He was also active (kommiteret) in Private Assurandører and chair of Nordisk Brandforsikring. In 1863–81, he was a member of Grosserer-Societetet's committee.

== Personal life ==
On 27 May 1847, Petersen married Caroline Weidemann (5 April 1826 - 1898). She was the daughter of royal bookkeeper Marcus Christian Weidemann (1796–1833) and Johanne Caroline Lütken (1802–26). They lived at Nyhavn 63 until his death.

Petersen died on 20 December 1900 and is buried at Frederiksberg Old Cemetery. He is one of the businessmen seen in Peder Severin Krøyer's monumental oil-on-canvas group portrait painting From Copenhagen Stock Exchange.

== Awards ==
Petersen was awarded the title of etatsråd in 1885. He was created a Knight of the Order of the Dannebrog in 1792 and was awarded its Cross of Honour in 1897.
