= Lars Gustafsson Vasa =

Lars Gustafsson Vasa (1 September 1586 – 1660) was the fictional son of Prince Gustav of Sweden.

According to the legend, Gustafsson was born in Silesia in 1586. In 1621 he married Brita Karth (née Törnros). They were earlier thought to be the parents of Lars Eldstjerna and Samuel Stjerneld, founders of the Swedish noble families of Eldstierna and Stierneld respectively. Modern scholars have however refuted this myth and Lars and Samuel are nowadays identified as the sons of a vogt at Händelö named Lars (died 1657), whose possible patronym might have been Björnsson.
