= Samuel Larsson Stjerneld =

Samuel Larsson Stjerneld (1637–1716) was son of Lars Gustafsson Vasa and Brita Törnros.

In unknown year Samuel espoused an Englishwoman, Brita Ratskin (her mother a Sydney), a learned woman, who spoke Latin, understood Greek, and died in childbirth. They had daughter Catharina Stjerneld.

In 1682 he married Margaretha Bethlen, daughter of Dutch merchant Mathias.
