= Lars Larsen =

Danish businessman (1948–2019)

- Born: Lars Kristinus Larsen; 6 August 1948; Arnborg, Herning Municipality, Denmark
- Died: 19 August 2019 (aged 71); Sejs-Svejbæk, Denmark
- Occupations: Owner and founder of Jysk
- Spouse: Married
- Children: 2, including Jacob Brunsborg

Lars Kristinus Larsen (6 August 1948 – 19 August 2019) was a Danish businessman, owner and founder of the Jysk retail chain.

== Career ==
Larsen was also known under the name Dyne-Larsen (Duvet-Larsen) and was the founder of the Jysk retail chain in 1979. Until 2001, the chain was named "Jysk Sengetøjslager" (Danish for "Jutlandic Bedding Store").

In 2009, when Jysk had its 30-year anniversary, Larsen self-published the book "30 år med Jysk" (eng.: "30 Years with Jysk"). He mailed a free copy to every household in Denmark, making it the #1 book in the country.

Forbes named him the 424th richest man in the world (August 2019).

In June 2019, it was announced that Larsen would retire, effective immediately, due to being diagnosed with severe liver cancer. He passed the post as chairman of the board to his son, Jacob Brunsborg. Larsen died on 19 August 2019.

== Honours ==
In June 2010, he received the Order of the Dannebrog knighthood.

== Personal life ==
He lived in Sejs-Svejbæk near Silkeborg from 1982. He is survived by his wife, two children and four grandchildren.
