= Jysk =

Danish retail company

Jysk A/S

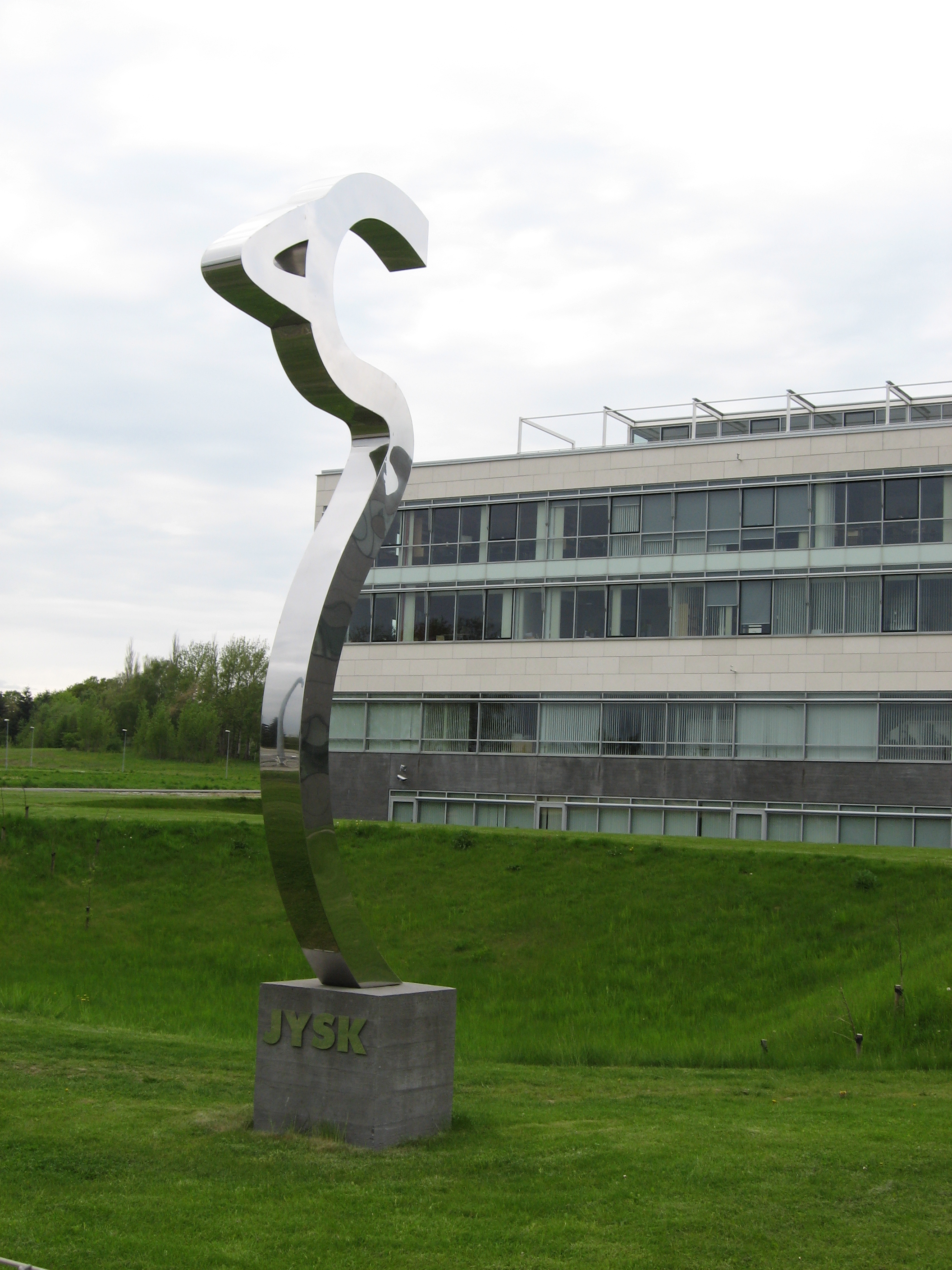
- Jysk's headquarters in Brabrand, Denmark
- Type: Private
- Industry: Retail
- Founded: 2 April 1979; 47 years ago in Aarhus, Denmark
- Founder: Lars Larsen
- Headquarters: Brabrand, Denmark
- Number of locations: 3,575
- Area served: Europe (including Armenia, Azerbaijan, Georgia, Greenland), Tajikistan, Kuwait, United Arab Emirates, Vietnam, Canada, Uruguay, Morocco
- Key people: Jacob Brunsborg (chairman)
- Revenue: ▲€6.2 billion (2025)
- Operating income: ▲€752 million (2025)
- Number of employees: 34,781
- Parent: Lars Larsen Group
- Website: jysk.com

Jysk A/S (Danish: [ˈjysk]) is a Danish retail chain specializing in household goods, including mattresses, furniture, and interior décor. As Denmark's largest international retailer, Jysk operates more than 3,400 stores across 48 countries.

The name "Jysk"—meaning "Jutlandic"—reflects the company's Danish heritage. It was founded by Lars Larsen, who opened the first store on Silkeborgvej in the Danish city of Aarhus in April 1979. Today, Jysk is owned by the family of its founder through the Lars Larsen Group, a holding company that also fully or partially owns furniture chains such as ILVA, IDÉmøbler, IDdesign, Bolia.com, and Sengespecialisten. The company's logo features a goose, symbolically linked to the brand's origins.

== History ==
=== 1979–1989 ===
On 2 April 1979, the first Jysk Sengetøjslager store opened in Aarhus, Denmark, where it continues to operate today.

In 1984, Jysk Sengetøjslager expanded beyond Denmark, opening its first store in Germany under the name Dänisches Bettenlager. That same year, the company launched its first franchise store in Greenland. In 1986, Jysk opened its first store in the Faroe Islands, followed by an expansion into Iceland in 1987, with a store in Kópavogur under the name "Rúmfatalagerinn." In 1988, Jysk entered the Norwegian market, opening its first store in Stavanger under the name "Norsk Sengetøylager."

=== 1990–1999 ===
In 1995, Jysk opened its first store in Finland. In 1996, Jysk expanded to North America, opening its first Canadian store in Coquitlam, British Columbia. In 1998, Jysk celebrated the opening of its 500th store.

=== 2000–2009 ===
In 2000, Jysk entered the Polish market. In 2001, the company unified its branding, changing store names in Denmark, Sweden, Norway, and Finland from Jysk Sengetøjslager, Jysk Bäddlager, Norsk Sengetøylager, and Jysk Vuodevarasto to simply Jysk. In 2004, Jysk opened its first store in Hungary. In 2008, Jysk Nordic inaugurated Northern Europe's largest warehouse in Uldum, Mid-Jutland, covering 64,000 m². That same year, Jysk expanded into the UK, with stores opening in Mansfield and Lincoln in April, followed by Blackburn and York during the summer.

=== 2010–2019 ===
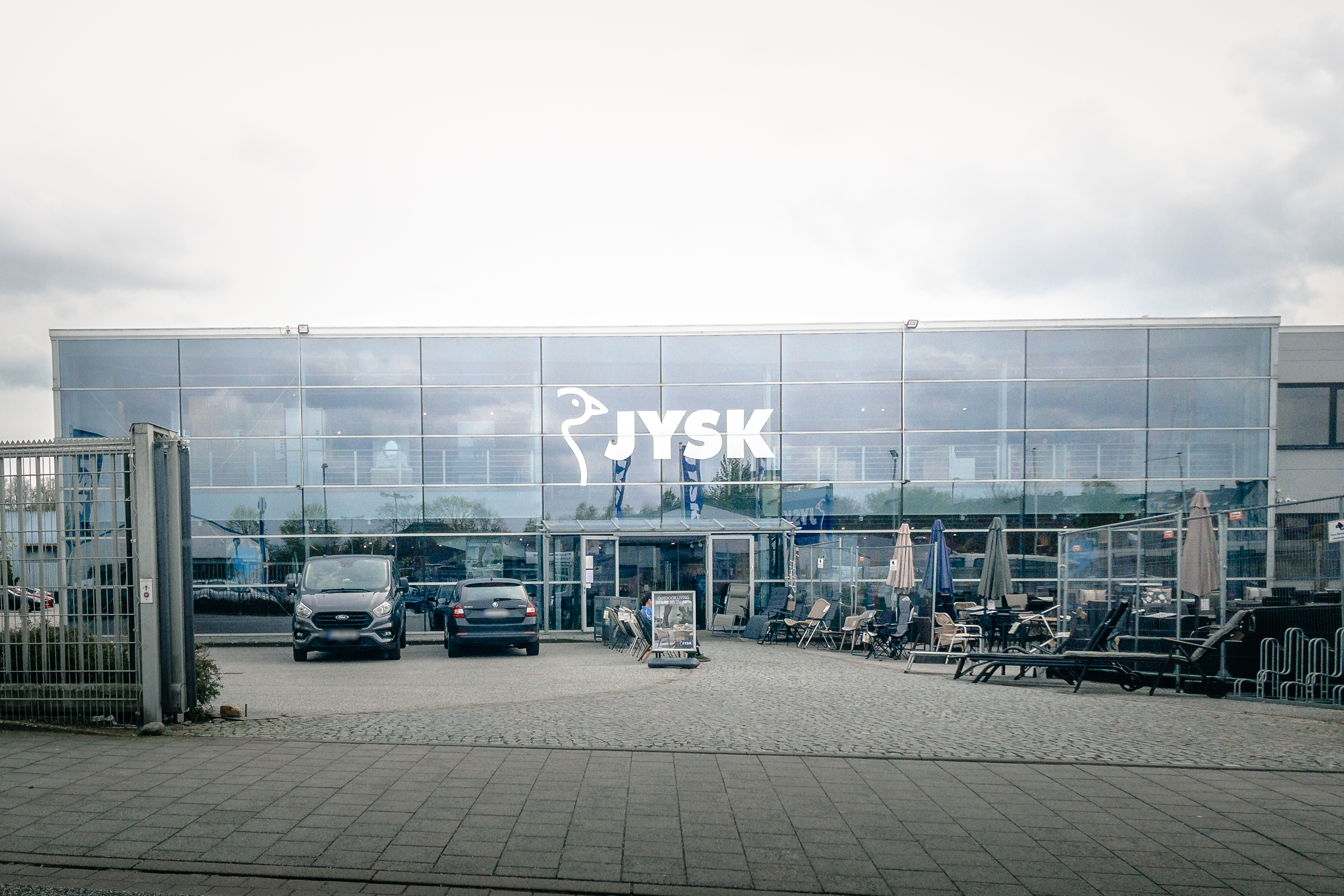
Jysk store in Kiel, Germany

In 2010, Jysk was awarded a royal warrant of appointment as purveyor to the Queen of Denmark. That year, the company's staff magazine GO JYSK received several accolades, including Staff Magazine of the Year in Denmark and second place in Europe. In 2011, Jysk launched its own television channel, www.jysk.tv. In 2013, Jysk entered the Caucasus region, opening its first store in Yerevan, Armenia. Between 2014 and 2015, Jysk expanded to Indonesia, opening stores in Mall Taman Anggrek and Pejaten Village in Jakarta. Jysk continued growing in Indonesia, with additional locations in Margo City Depok, Kuningan City, Pluit Village, and Aeon Mall BSD City in Tangerang. In 2016, Jysk expanded into Singapore, opening its first store at Tiong Bahru Plaza. That year, Jysk also launched stores in Belarus, Tajikistan, and Tbilisi, Georgia. In 2017, Jysk expanded further, opening a third store in Minsk, its first store in Brest, and its first store in Kuwait. In 2018, Jysk entered the UAE market with its first store in Dubai. In 2019, the company launched in Thailand and opened its first store in Baku, Azerbaijan. That same year, Jysk inaugurated its fourth logistics hub in Bulgaria, the DCB (Distribution Center Bozhurishte).

Jysk also entered the Republic of Ireland in 2019, opening its first store in Naas. Initially planning 15 stores nationwide, the goal was later increased to 40. As of February 2022, operational stores include locations in Naas, Drogheda, Navan, Portlaoise, Thurles, Youghal, Little Island, Limerick, Sligo, and Santry.

Lars Larsen died on 19 August 2019.

In September 2019, Jysk Nordic and Dänisches Bettenlager merged into a single business unit, with all stores rebranded under the Jysk name.

== Stores ==
Map of countries with Jysk stores

Jysk stores typically operate in a medium-sized format, with an average area of 1,300 m^{2} (14,000 sq ft).

Historically, Jysk stores operated through three main entities: Jysk Nordic, Dänisches Bettenlager, and Jysk Franchise.

Jysk Nordic managed more than 1,500 stores across 21 countries, including those in Scandinavia and Central and Eastern Europe. Dänisches Bettenlager operated over 1,300 stores in Germany, Austria, Switzerland, Italy, France, Spain, and Portugal. The name "Dänisches Bettenlager" was used until 2020 in Austria and until 2021 in Germany, which remains Jysk's largest market. In other countries, including Switzerland, Italy, France, Spain, and Portugal, the stores have long used the Jysk brand. Today, Jysk Nordic and Dänisches Bettenlager have been consolidated into a single entity under the unified Jysk name.

Jysk also operates under franchise agreements in over 200 stores across 23 countries, including Canada, the Caucasus, the Baltics, the United Arab Emirates, Kuwait, Tajikistan, Uruguay, and Vietnam.

=== Geographic distribution ===
Number of stores by country as of 1 November 2025.

Country	Since	Stores	Entity
Germany	1984	923	Jysk
Poland	2000	330	Jysk
Romania	2006	157	Jysk
Sweden	1991	159	Jysk
Denmark	1979	116	Jysk
Netherlands	2006	104	Jysk
Norway	1988	108	Jysk
Czech Republic	2003	104	Jysk
Finland	1995	93	Jysk
Austria	2000	92	Jysk
Hungary	2005	102	Jysk
Spain	2009	169	Jysk
Ukraine	2004	100	Jysk
Switzerland	2006	73	Jysk
Italy	2009	106	Jysk
Canada	1996	70	Jysk Franchise
France	2007	71	Jysk
Slovakia	2006	53	Jysk
Croatia	2009	68	Jysk
Greece	2015	69	Jysk
Bulgaria	2005	60	Jysk
Serbia	2011	49	Jysk
Belgium	2017	70	Jysk
Bosnia and Herzegovina	2010	32	Jysk
United Kingdom	2008	26	Jysk
Slovenia	2008	29	Jysk
Portugal	2010	34	Jysk
Lithuania	2001	16	Jysk Franchise
Vietnam	2015	13	Jysk Franchise
Estonia	2002	14	Jysk Franchise
Latvia	2001	15	Jysk Franchise
Ireland	2019	27	Jysk
Kosovo	2004	12	Jysk Franchise
Moldova	2016	16	Jysk Franchise
Azerbaijan	2019	11	Jysk Franchise
Iceland	1987	7	Jysk Franchise
Greenland	1984	6	Jysk Franchise
Albania	2015	6	Jysk Franchise
Georgia	2016	8	Jysk Franchise
United Arab Emirates	2018	5	Jysk Franchise
Turkey	2023	8	Jysk
North Macedonia	2008	6	Jysk Franchise
Montenegro	2015	3	Jysk Franchise
Kuwait	2017	4	Jysk Franchise
Malta	2016	3	Jysk Franchise
Tajikistan	2016	6	Jysk Franchise
Armenia	2013	3	Jysk Franchise
Morocco	2025	3	Jysk
Faroe Islands	1986	1	Jysk Franchise
Uruguay	2025	1	Jysk Franchise
