= Lars Larsson (racing driver) =

Swedish rallycross driver

Lasse Larsson
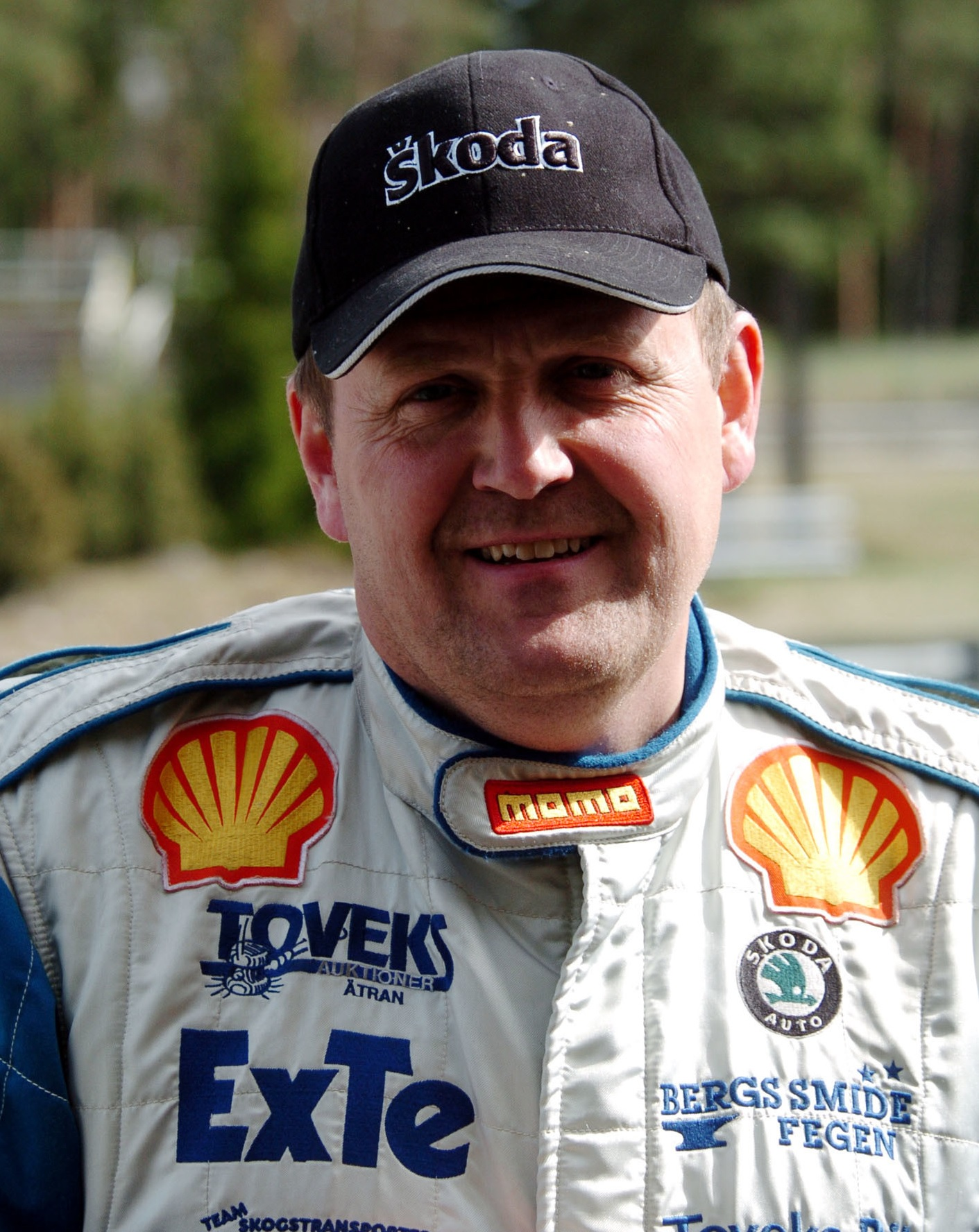
- Larsson in 2007
- Nationality: (Sweden) Swedish
- Born: Lars Christer Larsson; December 11, 1965 (age 60) Sweden
- Retired: 2007
- Relatives: Robin Larsson (son)

FIA ERX Division 1 Championship
- Years active: 2000–2007
- Teams: Larsson Motorsport; Toveks Racing
- Starts: 76
- Championships: 2 (2006, 2007)
- Wins: 9
- Podiums: 24

Lars Christer Larsson (born December 11, 1965) is a former rallycross driver from Sweden. He is usually referred to as "Lasse" or sometimes as "Stinsen".

== Career ==
Larsson started his rallycross career in the Swedish Rallycross Championship, winning the National Division in 1996, 1997 and 1998. He progressed to the FIA European Rallycross Championship in 2000, driving an Audi A4 in Division 1 for his own team. His breakthrough came in 2006, when he broke the dominance of Kenneth Hansen, winning the Division 1 title by three points in a Škoda Fabia. He defended his title in 2007, with Hansen finishing second again.

== Retirement ==
Larsson retired after the 2007 season and joined his family's trucking company in Svenljunga. His son Robin currently competes in the FIA European Rallycross Championship and is the 2014 Supercar Champion.

== Racing record ==
=== Complete FIA European Rallycross Championship results ===
==== Division 1 ====
Year	Entrant	Car	1	2	3	4	5	6	7	8	9	10	11	ERX	Points
2000	Larsson Motorsport	Audi A4 T16	POR	FRA	CZE; 8	SWE; 10	BEL; NC	NED; NC	NOR; 16	POL; 9	GER; NC			10th	47
2001	Larsson Motorsport	Audi A4 T16	FRA (14)	POR	AUT; 10	CZE; 9	SWE; 10	BEL (15)	NED	NOR; 4	POL; 11	GER; 4		10th	54
2002	Larsson Motorsport	Audi A4 T16	POR; 3	FRA; 2	AUT; 3	CZE (6)	SWE; DSQ	BEL; 4	NED; 11	NOR (12)	POL; 3	GER; 11		5th	87
2003	Larsson Motorsport	Audi A4 T16	POR; 5	FRA (14)	AUT; 9	CZE; 2	SWE; 3	BEL; 8	NED (11)	NOR; 6	POL; 1	GER; 4		5th	105
2004	Toveks Racing	Škoda Fabia T16	POR (11)	FRA; 3	CZE; 10	AUT; 7	NOR; 7	SWE; 6	BEL (8)	NED; 8	POL; 1	GER; 4		6th	95
2005	Toveks Racing	Škoda Fabia T16	FRA (NC)	POR; 2	AUT; 2	CZE; 2	NOR; 4	SWE; 5	BEL (16)	NED; 4	POL; 5	GER; 3		4th	116
2006	Toveks Racing	Škoda Fabia T16	POR; 2	FRA; 1	CZE; 5	AUT; 2	SWE (6)	HUN; 6	BEL; 1	NED (11)	NOR; 5	POL; 1	GER; 5	1st	143
2007	Toveks Racing	Škoda Fabia T16	POR; 1	FRA; 9	HUN (NC)	AUT; 4	SWE; 1	NOR; 3	BEL (5)	NED; 3	POL; 1	CZE; 1		1st	131

== Publications ==
Lasse "Stinsen" Larsson – Det går som på räls, by Lars Larsson & Morgan Björk, 160 pages, Swedish language, ISBN 9789197655453

Sporting positions
Preceded by Kenneth Hansen	European Rallycross Division 1 Champion; 2006-2007	Succeeded by Kenneth Hansen
