= Lars Larsen House =

Building in Copenhagen

- Lars Larsens Gård
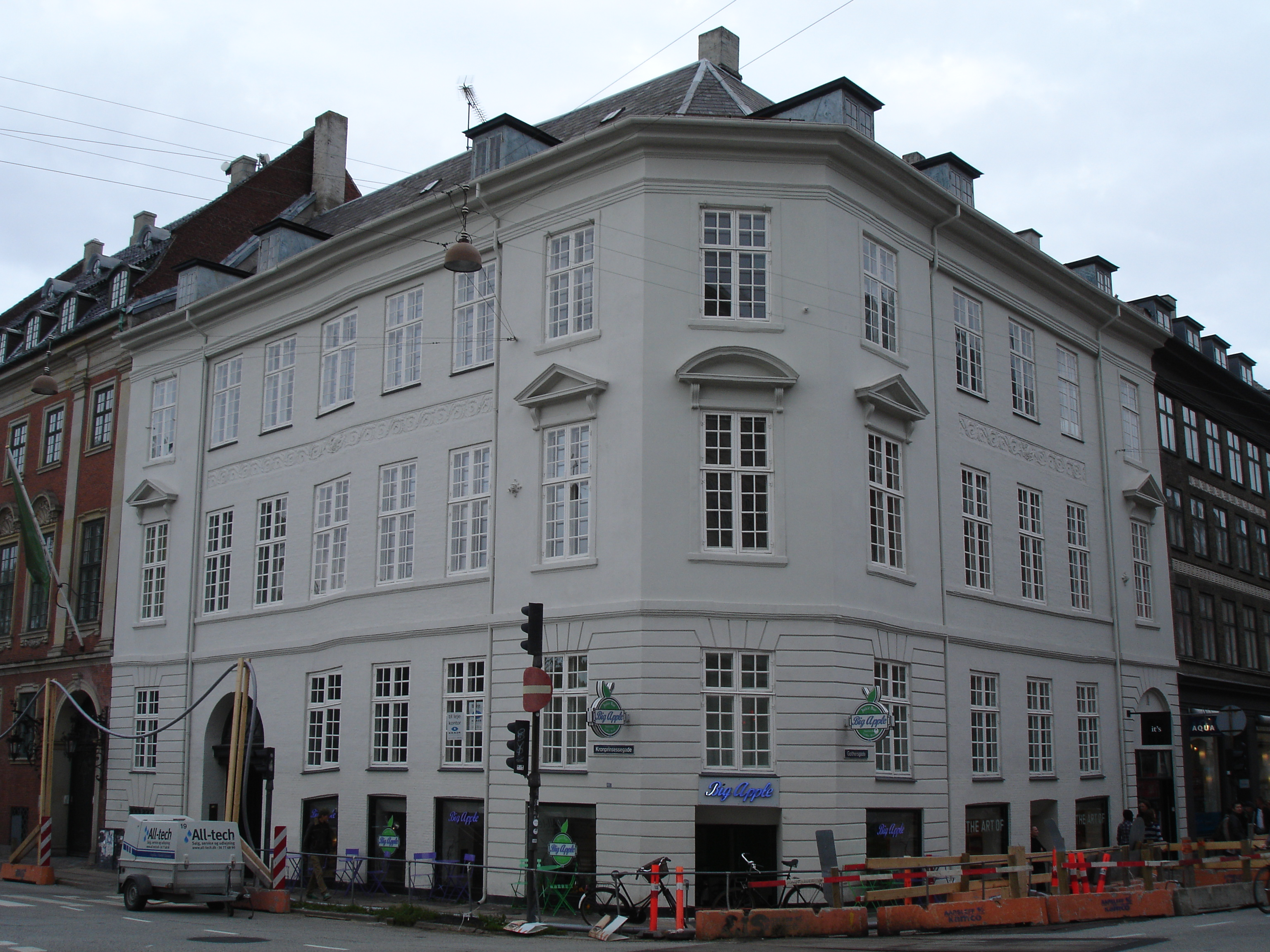
- Interactive map of the Lars Larsen House area

General information
- Location: Copenhagen, Denmark
- Coordinates: 55°40′57.98″N 12°34′51.59″E
- Completed: 1801

The Lars Larsen House (Danish: Lars Larsens Gård) is a Neoclassical property located at the corner of Kronprinsessegade (No. 2) and Gothersgade (No. 58) in central Copenhagen, Denmark. It was constructed for ship-builder Lars Larsen shortly after the creation of Kronprinsessegade in the early 1800s. It was listed in the Danish registry of protected buildings and places in 1918. Larsen resided in the building until his death in 1844. Other notable former residents include former chiefs of police Andreas Christian Kierulff and Cosmus Bræstrup.

== History ==
=== Lars Larsen, 1791–1843 ===
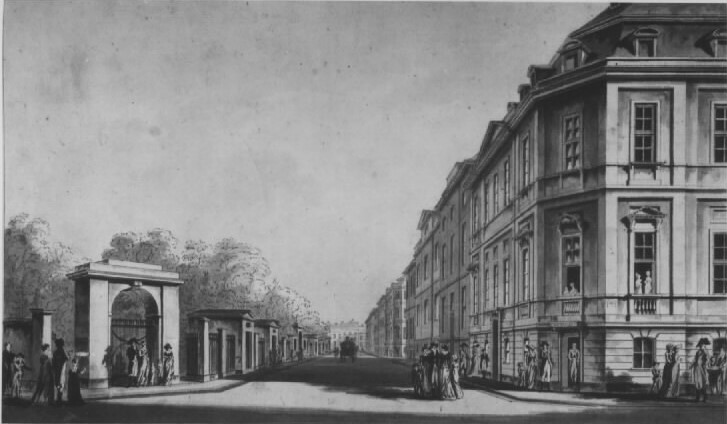
The Lars Larsen House in 1804

The building was constructed for shipbuilder Lars Larsen in 1801. Lars Larsen owned the building until his death in 1844.

Larsen's property was listed in the new cadastre of 1806 as No. 1 in St. Ann's West Quarter.

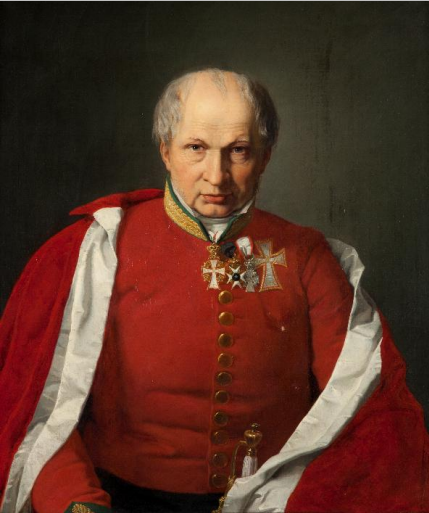
Andreas Christian Kierulff in 1835.

Larsen's property was home to a total of 45 residents in four households at the 1834 census. Lars Larsen resided on the first floor with four unmarried children (aged 20 to 27), his sister-in-law Axilia Ursin, a housekeeper, three male servants and three maids. John Wilhelm Cornts Krüger, a captain and kammerjunker, resided on the ground floor with his wife Ane Sophie Raivert, their three sons (aged seven to 20), one male servant and two maids. Andreas Christian Kierulf, Copenhagen's Head of Police, resided on the second floor with his wife Magdalene Marie (née Estrup), their 19-year-old daughter Julie Luise Kierulf, his sister Charlotte Theodore Kierulf, 82-year-old Anne Margrethe, two male servants and two maids. Michael Ancher Schinchel, a grocer (urtekræmmer), resided in the basement with two employees and one servant.

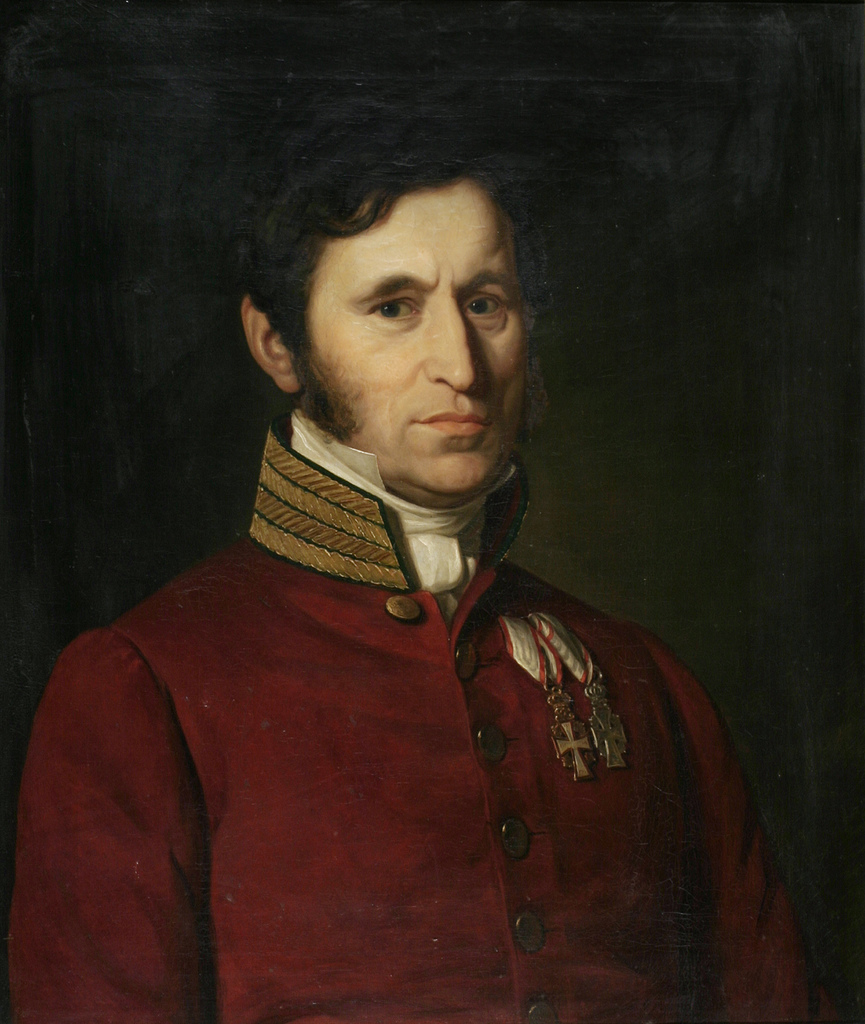
Cosmus Bræstrup 1844.

The property was home to 32 residents in four households at the 1840 census. The first floor had now been divided into two apartments. Lars Larsen resided in one of them with three unmarried daughters, his sister-in-law, his housekeeper, three male servants and two maids. Eliane Dorthea Friben, a widow midwife, resided in the other first-floor apartment with her daughter Maria Elise Friben, her son-in-law Frederik Christian Helgreen (master painter), one maid and three lodgers. Cosmus Bræstrup, Copenhagen's new Head of Police, resided on the ground floor with his wife Christiane Lassen, their four children (aged one to seven), one male servant and two maids. Ludvig Munderloh, a goldsmith, resided on the third floor with his wife Ane Munderloh, their 11-year-old son Julius Adolf Roos and two lodgers (students).

The property was again home to four households at the 1845 census. Frederikke Marie Larsine Jacobine Larsen, one of Larsen's daughters, resided on the ground floor with her mother's sister Axlia Nicoline Ursenm 52-year-old Christine Christina Weilherm one male servant and one maid. Andreas Christian Kierulff, who was now Copenhagen's Head of Police as well as of the Postal Services, resided on the first floor with his wife Caroline Emilie Henriette Kierulff, their 30-year-old daughter Julie Lovise Kierulff, a female cook, three male servants and one maid. Cosmus Bræstrup was still residing on the second floor with his wife Christiane Erasmine Bræstrup født Lassen, their now five children (aged one to 12), one male servant and three maids. Ludvig Richter, a grocer (urtekræmmer), resided in the basement with his wife Henriette Nathalie Luise Richter, their two daughters (aged two and three), a grocer's apprentice, one male servant and one maid.

=== 1860 census ===
Many of the residents were the same at the 1850 and 1860 censuses.Caroline Kierulff was still residing on the ground floor. Peter Stilling was still residing on the first floor. Christian Jacob Cosmus Brædstrup was still residing on the second floor.

=== Later history ===
The property was later owned by the medical doctor Niels C hristian Borberg (1835-1896). He never lived in the building. His home were thus located at Krtstalgade 24 (1875-1880), Gothersgade 30 (1883-1888) and Store Kongensgade 39 (1888-1896). The Lars Larsen House was sold by his heirs in 1913.

== Architecture ==
The building has seven bays towards Kronprinsessegade, a single-bay chamfered corner, and five bays towards Gothersgade.

== See also ==
- Kronprinsessegade 4
