= Lars Larsen (1758–1844) =

Danish merchant, ship-owner and shipbuilder

Lars Larsen (25 March 1758 – 18 January 1844) was a Danish merchant, ship-owner and shipbuilder. The Lars Larsen House, (Lars Larsens Gård) his former home in Copenhagen, was listed on the Danish registry of protected buildings and places in 1918. He has also lent his name to Larsens Plads, a former dockyard located adjacent to Amalienborg Palace.

== Early life and education ==
Larsen was born in Copenhagen, the son of silk weaver and later brewer Peder Larsen (c. 1729–1809) and Charlotte Margaretha Larsen née Holm. He apprenticed as a shipbuilder under Erik Eskildsen at Østersøisk-guineisk Handelsselskab's shipyard.

== Career ==
Larsen became master shipbuilder for the consortium.

He was also involved in overseas trade. In 1797, he had the third largest commercial fleet in Copenhagen, only surpassed by the Danish Asiatic Company and Duntzfeldt. He made large investments on the property market in Copenhagen. In 1802, he purchased Larsens Plads from Duntzfeldt, Meyer & Co. for 42,000 rigsdaler and established a shipyard in the grounds. He was also the owner of the Blue Warehouse and a site on Slotsholmen.

== Property ==
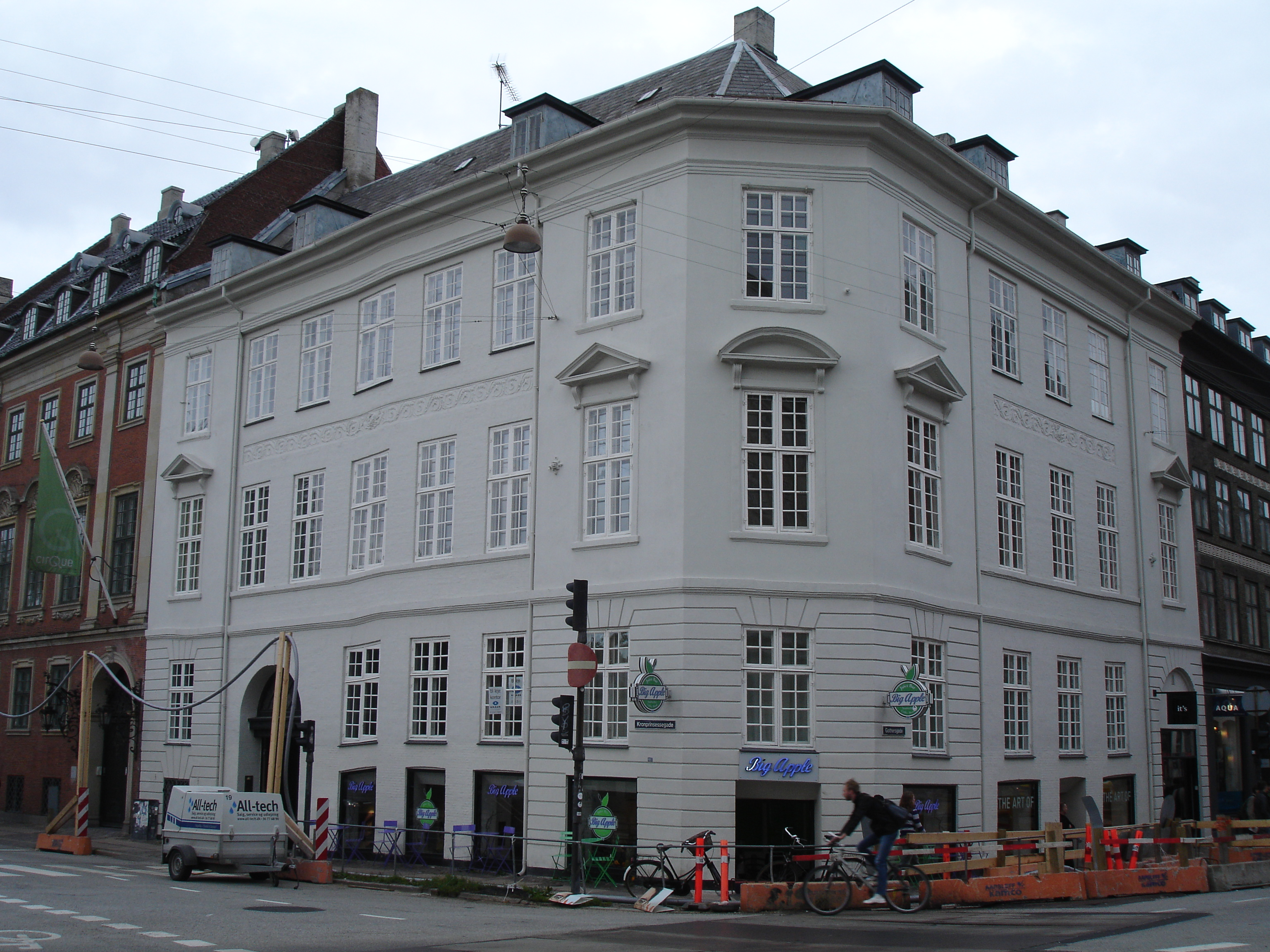
Lars Larsens Gård

Larsen constructed the first house in the street Kronprinsessegade, now known as the Lars Larsen House. It was completed in 1801 and he lived there until his death in 1844.

== Philanthropy ==
In 1786, Larsen established a public bath for men at Langelinie. In 1787, he established a public bath for women at Langebro. He received a gold medal pro meritis from the king for the initiative.

== Family and death ==
He married Jacobine Ursin (25 March 1772 – 3 October 1819) on 20 March 1807 in the Church of Holmen. She was a daughter of Captain Lieutenant and later Counter Admiral Svend Martin Ursin (1728–1810) and Frederikke Marie Ursin (1741–1816). The couple had two daughters. Caroline Emilie Henriette Larsen (1801–1891), their eldest daughter, married jurist, overpresident and head of police Andreas Christian Kierulff (1782–1846). Charlotte Margrethe Larsen (1809–1887), their younger daughter, married Wilhelm Huth Krag (1800–1887).

Lars Larsen died on 18 January 1844 and is buried at Assistens Cemetery in Copenhagen.
