= 2017–18 IIHF Continental Cup =

Ice hockey competition

2017–2018 IIHF Continental Cup

Tournament details
- Dates: 29 September 2017 – 14 January 2018
- Teams: 17

Final positions
- Champions: (Belarus) Yunost Minsk (3rd title)
- Runners-up: (Kazakhstan) Nomad Astana
- Third place: (United Kingdom) Sheffield Steelers
- Fourth place: (Italy) Ritten Sport

Tournament statistics
- Games played: 36

The 2017–18 Continental Cup was the 21st edition of the IIHF Continental Cup, Europe's second-tier ice hockey club competition organised by International Ice Hockey Federation. The season started on 29 September 2017 and the final tournament was played on 12–14 January 2018.

== Qualified teams ==
Location of teams for the 2017–18 IIHF Continental Cup
Blue: First round; Red: Second round; Green: Third round

Team	Qualification
Enter in the third round
(Denmark) Rungsted Ishockey	2016–17 Metal Cup winners
(Kazakhstan) Nomad Astana	2016–17 Kazakhstan Hockey Championship winners
(Italy) Ritten Sport	2016–17 Alps Hockey League winners
(Belarus) Yunost Minsk	2016–17 Belarusian Extraliga runners-up
(France) Brûleurs de Loups	2016–17 Ligue Magnus regular season runners-up
(United Kingdom) Sheffield Steelers	2016–17 Elite League play-off winners
Enter in the second round
(Ukraine) HC Donbass	2016–17 Ukrainian Hockey League winners
(Latvia) Kurbads Riga	2016–17 Latvian Hockey Higher League winners
(Hungary) DVTK Jegesmedvék	2016–17 MOL Liga season winners
(Spain) Txuri Urdin	2016–17 Liga Nacional de Hockey Hielo winners
(Poland) GKS Tychy	2016–17 Polska Hokej Liga runners-up
(Romania) Corona Brașov	2016–17 Romanian Hockey League winners
(Estonia) Narva PSK	2016–17 Meistriliiga winners
Enter in the first round
(Serbia) Crvena Zvezda	2016–17 Serbian Hockey League runners-up
(Iceland) Esja Reykjavik	2016–17 Icelandic Hockey League winners
(Bulgaria) Irbis-Skate Sofia	2016–17 Bulgarian Hockey League winners
(Turkey) Zeytinburnu Belediyespor	2016–17 Turkish Ice Hockey Super League winners

== First round ==
=== Group A ===
The Group A tournament was played in Belgrade, Serbia, from 29 September to 1 October 2017 with all games were held at the Pionir Ice Hall.

Pos	Team	Pld	W	OTW	OTL	L	GF	GA	GD	Pts	Qualification
1	(Serbia) Crvena Zvezda (H)	3	2	1	0	0	15	8	+7	8	Advance to Second round
2	(Turkey) Zeytinburnu Belediyespor	3	1	1	0	1	10	9	+1	5	
3	(Bulgaria) Irbis-Skate Sofia	3	1	0	1	1	11	11	0	4	
4	(Iceland) Esja Reykjavik	3	0	0	1	2	5	13	−8	1	

Source: IIHF.com
(H) Host

All times are local. (CEST – UTC+2)

29 September 2017; 16:00	Zeytinburnu Belediyespor (Turkey)	4–3 (1–2, 1–1, 2–0)	(Bulgaria) Irbis-Skate Sofia	Pionir Ice Hall; Attendance: 23

Game reference
12 min	Penalties	12 min
25	Shots	32

29 September 2017; 19:30	Crvena Zvezda (Serbia)	6–1 (3–0, 0–1, 3–0)	(Iceland) Esja Reykjavik	Pionir Ice Hall; Attendance: 142

Game reference
8 min	Penalties	12 min
38	Shots	16

30 September 2017; 16:00	Irbis-Skate Sofia (Bulgaria)	4–2 (0–0, 2–1, 2–1)	(Iceland) Esja Reykjavik	Pionir Ice Hall; Attendance: 30

Game reference
12 min	Penalties	10 min
37	Shots	24

30 September 2017; 19:30	Crvena Zvezda (Serbia)	4–3 (0–0, 2–1, 2–2)	(Turkey) Zeytinburnu Belediyespor	Pionir Ice Hall; Attendance: 125

Game reference
14 min	Penalties	6 min
41	Shots	31

1 October 2017; 16:00	Esja Reykjavik (Iceland)	2–3 GWS (0–0, 0–1, 2–1) (OT 0–0) (SO 0–1)	(Turkey) Zeytinburnu Belediyespor	Pionir Ice Hall; Attendance: 20

Game reference
10 min	Penalties	14 min
45	Shots	25

1 October 2017; 19:30	Irbis-Skate Sofia (Bulgaria)	4–5 OT (1–2, 1–1, 2–1) (OT 0–1)	(Serbia) Crvena Zvezda	Pionir Ice Hall; Attendance: 180

Game reference
10 min	Penalties	16 min
39	Shots	47

== Second round ==
=== Group B ===
The Group B tournament was played in Riga, Latvia, from 20 to 22 October 2017 with all games were held at the Kurbads Ledus Halle.

Pos	Team	Pld	W	OTW	OTL	L	GF	GA	GD	Pts	Qualification
1	(Latvia) Kurbads Riga (H)	3	3	0	0	0	15	4	+11	9	Advance to Third round
2	(Poland) GKS Tychy	3	2	0	0	1	17	7	+10	6	
3	(Ukraine) HC Donbass	3	1	0	0	2	7	14	−7	3	
4	(Estonia) Narva PSK	3	0	0	0	3	3	17	−14	0	

Source: IIHF
(H) Host

All times are local. (EEST – UTC+3)

20 October 2017; 15:30	HC Donbass (Ukraine)	4–2 (1–1, 1–0, 2–1)	(Estonia) Narva PSK	Kurbads Ledus Halle; Attendance: 153

Game reference
4 min	Penalties	12 min
43	Shots	33

20 October 2017; 19:30	Kurbads Riga (Latvia)	5–2 (1–0, 2–0, 2–2)	(Poland) GKS Tychy	Kurbads Ledus Halle; Attendance: 840

Game reference
20 min	Penalties	26 min
30	Shots	35

21 October 2017; 14:00	GKS Tychy (Poland)	11–0 (3–0, 5–0, 3–0)	(Estonia) Narva PSK	Kurbads Ledus Halle; Attendance: 307

Game reference
16 min	Penalties	20 min
70	Shots	11

21 October 2017; 18:00	HC Donbass (Ukraine)	1–8 (0–2, 1–4, 0–2)	(Latvia) Kurbads Riga	Kurbads Ledus Halle; Attendance: 418

Game reference
6 min	Penalties	10 min
24	Shots	38

22 October 2017; 14:00	GKS Tychy (Poland)	4–2 (3–0, 0–2, 1–0)	(Ukraine) HC Donbass	Kurbads Ledus Halle; Attendance: 576

Game reference
30 min	Penalties	12 min
49	Shots	24

22 October 2017; 18:00	Narva PSK (Estonia)	1–2 (1–0, 0–1, 0–1)	(Latvia) Kurbads Riga	Kurbads Ledus Halle; Attendance: 781

Game reference
12 min	Penalties	8 min
14	Shots	39

=== Group C ===
The Group C tournament was played in Brașov, Romania, from 20 to 22 October 2017 with all games were held at the Brașov Olympic Ice Rink.

Pos	Team	Pld	W	OTW	OTL	L	GF	GA	GD	Pts	Qualification
1	(Hungary) DVTK Jegesmedvék	3	3	0	0	0	12	1	+11	9	Advance to Third round
2	(Romania) Corona Brașov (H)	3	2	0	0	1	12	8	+4	6	
3	(Spain) Txuri Urdin	3	0	1	0	2	4	11	−7	2	
4	(Serbia) Crvena Zvezda	3	0	0	1	2	7	15	−8	1	

Source: IIHF
(H) Host

All times are local. (EEST – UTC+3)

20 October 2017; 14:30	Txuri Urdin (Spain)	0–5 (0–3, 0–2, 0–0)	(Hungary) DVTK Jegesmedvék	Brașov Olympic Ice Rink; Attendance: 65

Game reference
12 min	Penalties	12 min
12	Shots	40

20 October 2017; 18:30	Corona Brașov (Romania)	8–4 (5–1, 1–1, 2–2)	(Serbia) Crvena Zvezda	Brașov Olympic Ice Rink; Attendance: 566

Game reference
4 min	Penalties	8 min
37	Shots	19

21 October 2017; 14:30	DVTK Jegesmedvék (Hungary)	4–1 (0–0, 2–1, 2–0)	(Serbia) Crvena Zvezda	Brașov Olympic Ice Rink; Attendance: 142

Game reference
14 min	Penalties	12 min
53	Shots	21

21 October 2017; 18:30	Corona Brașov (Romania)	4–1 (1–0, 0–1, 3–0)	(Spain) Txuri Urdin	Brașov Olympic Ice Rink; Attendance: 594

Game reference
75 min	Penalties	26 min
55	Shots	19

22 October 2017; 14:30	Crvena Zvezda (Serbia)	2–3 OT (1–1, 1–1, 0–0) (OT 0–1)	(Spain) Txuri Urdin	Brașov Olympic Ice Rink; Attendance: 28

Game reference
28 min	Penalties	16 min
36	Shots	24

22 October 2017; 18:30	DVTK Jegesmedvék (Hungary)	3–0 (2–0, 0–0, 1–0)	(Romania) Corona Brașov	Brașov Olympic Ice Rink; Attendance: 1085

Game reference
8 min	Penalties	14 min
27	Shots	32

== Third round ==
=== Group D ===
The Group D tournament was played in Rungsted, Denmark, from 17 to 19 November 2017 with all games were held at the Saxo Bank Arena.

Pos	Team	Pld	W	OTW	OTL	L	GF	GA	GD	Pts	Qualification
1	(Belarus) Yunost Minsk	3	3	0	0	0	13	4	+9	9	Advance to Final round
2	(United Kingdom) Sheffield Steelers	3	1	1	0	1	10	13	−3	5	Advance to Final round
3	(Latvia) Kurbads Riga	3	1	0	0	2	12	12	0	3	
4	(Denmark) Rungsted Ishockey (H)	3	0	0	1	2	9	15	−6	1	

Source: IIHF
(H) Host

All times are local. (CET – UTC+1)

17 November 2017; 16:00	Yunost Minsk (Belarus)	7–1 (3–0, 3–0, 1–1)	(United Kingdom) Sheffield Steelers	Saxo Bank Arena; Attendance: 641

Game reference
12 min	Penalties	14 min
23	Shots	24

17 November 2017; 19:45	Rungsted Ishockey (Denmark)	4–8 (3–3, 1–2, 0–3)	(Latvia) Kurbads Riga	Saxo Bank Arena; Attendance: 1,168

Game reference
33 min	Penalties	18 min
36	Shots	41

18 November 2017; 16:00	Kurbads Riga (Latvia)	2–4 (0–0, 1–2, 1–2)	(Belarus) Yunost Minsk	Saxo Bank Arena; Attendance: 619

Game reference
12 min	Penalties	6 min
22	Shots	31

18 November 2017; 19:45	Sheffield Steelers (United Kingdom)	5–4 GWS (0–2, 3–2, 1–0) (OT 0–0) (SO 1–0)	(Denmark) Rungsted Ishockey	Saxo Bank Arena; Attendance: 1,283

Game reference
10 min	Penalties	2 min
50	Shots	35

19 November 2017; 14:00	Sheffield Steelers (United Kingdom)	4–2 (3–2, 0–0, 1–0)	(Latvia) Kurbads Riga	Saxo Bank Arena; Attendance: 915

Game reference
16 min	Penalties	39 min
32	Shots	30

19 November 2017; 18:00	Rungsted Ishockey (Denmark)	1–2 (1–0, 0–2, 0–0)	(Belarus) Yunost Minsk	Saxo Bank Arena; Attendance: 650

Game reference
14 min	Penalties	16 min
24	Shots	45

=== Group E ===
The Group E tournament was played in Ritten, Italy, from 17 to 19 November 2017 with all games were held at the Arena Ritten.

Pos	Team	Pld	W	OTW	OTL	L	GF	GA	GD	Pts	Qualification
1	(Kazakhstan) Nomad Astana	3	2	0	1	0	8	3	+5	7	Advance to Final round
2	(Italy) Ritten Sport (H)	3	2	0	0	1	6	4	+2	6	Advance to Final round
3	(Hungary) DVTK Jegesmedvék	3	0	2	0	1	5	5	0	4	
4	(France) Brûleurs de Loups	3	0	0	1	2	1	8	−7	1	

Source: IIHF
(H) Host

All times are local. (CET – UTC+1)

17 November 2017; 16:00	Nomad Astana (Kazakhstan)	1–2 GWS (0–1, 0–0, 1–0) (OT 0–0) (SO 0–1)	(Hungary) DVTK Jegesmedvék	Arena Ritten; Attendance: 300

Game reference
10 min	Penalties	10 min
32	Shots	30

17 November 2017; 20:00	Ritten Sport (Italy)	2–0 (1–0, 0–0, 1–0)	(France) Brûleurs de Loups	Arena Ritten; Attendance: 910

Game reference
6 min	Penalties	12 min
27	Shots	29

18 November 2017; 16:00	Brûleurs de Loups (France)	1–2 OT (1–0, 0–1, 0–0) (OT 0–1)	(Hungary) DVTK Jegesmedvék	Arena Ritten; Attendance: 432

Game reference
14 min	Penalties	6 min
36	Shots	30

18 November 2017; 20:00	Nomad Astana (Kazakhstan)	3–1 (1–1, 2–0, 0–0)	(Italy) Ritten Sport	Arena Ritten; Attendance: 1,050

Game reference
12 min	Penalties	20 min
22	Shots	28

19 November 2017; 16:00	Brûleurs de Loups (France)	0–4 (0–1, 0–1, 0–2)	(Kazakhstan) Nomad Astana	Arena Ritten; Attendance: 310

Game reference
18 min	Penalties	10 min
30	Shots	25

19 November 2017; 20:00	DVTK Jegesmedvék (Hungary)	1–3 (0–1, 0–0, 1–2)	(Italy) Ritten Sport	Arena Ritten; Attendance: 1,237

Game reference
55 min	Penalties	91 min
30	Shots	24

== Final round ==
Continental Cup Final tournament was played in Minsk, Belarus, from 12 to 14 January 2018 with all games were held at the Čyžoŭka-Arena.

Pos	Team	Pld	W	OTW	OTL	L	GF	GA	GD	Pts	Qualification
1	(Belarus) Yunost Minsk (H)	3	3	0	0	0	12	7	+5	9	Qualification to Champions Hockey League
2	(Kazakhstan) Nomad Astana	3	1	1	0	1	10	8	+2	5	
3	(United Kingdom) Sheffield Steelers	3	1	0	0	2	7	10	−3	3	
4	(Italy) Ritten Sport	3	0	0	1	2	3	7	−4	1	

Source: IIHF
(H) Host

All times are local. (FET – UTC+3)

12 January 2018; 15:00	Ritten Sport (Italy)	1–2 (0–2, 0–0, 1–0)	(Belarus) Yunost Minsk	Čyžoŭka-Arena; Attendance: 3,120

Game reference

Patrick Killeen
Goalies
Dmitri Milchakov
Referees:
(Czech Republic) Vladimír Pešina
(Germany) Marian Rohatsch
Linesmen:
(Switzerland) Dominik Altmann
(Slovenia) Gašper Jaka Zgonc

	0–1	07:33 – Plotnikov (EA)
	0–2	10:16 – Karakulko (Plotnikov)
Tudin (Hofer) – 56:39	1–2

4 min
Penalties
4 min
25
Shots
35

12 January 2018; 19:00	Nomad Astana (Kazakhstan)	5–1 (1–0, 1–0, 3–1)	(United Kingdom) Sheffield Steelers	Čyžoŭka-Arena; Attendance: 273

Game reference

Vladimir Kramar
Goalies
Ervīns Muštukovs
Referees:
(Slovakia) Daniel Konc
(Russia) Yuriy Oskirko
Linesmen:
(Belarus) Dmitry Golyak
(Belarus) Mikita Paliakou

Yakovlev (Petukhov, Asetov) – 01:51	1–0
Gurin (Mikhailis, Grebenshchikov) – 23:48	2–0
Mikhailis (Gurin, Lakiza) (PP2) – 41:58	3–0
Asetov (Pelevin) (PP) – 42:48	4–0
Mikhailis (Grebenshchikov) (PP) – 48:34	5–0
	5–1	54:54 – Neiley (Valdix)

33 min
Penalties
14 min
33
Shots
31

13 January 2018; 15:00	Nomad Astana (Kazakhstan)	3–2 GWS (0–2, 1–0, 1–0) (OT: 0–0) (SO: 3–2)	(Italy) Ritten Sport	Čyžoŭka-Arena; Attendance: 262

Game reference

Vladimir Kramar
Goalies
Patrick Killeen
Referees:
(Sweden) Marcus Linde
(Russia) Yuriy Oskirko
Linesmen:
(Belarus) Pavel Badyl
(Belarus) Mikita Paliakou

	0–1	04:28 – Jean (Frei, J. Kostner)
	0–2	17:24 – Hofer (Tudin, Spinell)
Mikhailis (Grents) – 38:52	1–2
Grents (Gurin, Mikhailis) – 44:35	2–2

Grents
Petukhov (miss)
Mikhailis
Kovzalov (miss)
Zhdakhin
Shootout
Lutz
V. Ahlström
(miss) O. Ahlström
(miss) Jean
(miss) Frei
10 min
Penalties
31 min
36
Shots
27

13 January 2018; 19:00	Yunost Minsk (Belarus)	5–4 (2–2, 1–1, 2–1)	(United Kingdom) Sheffield Steelers	Čyžoŭka-Arena; Attendance: 3,800

Game reference

Dmitri Milchakov
Goalies
Ervīns Muštukovs
Referees:
(Czech Republic) Vladimír Pešina
(Germany) Marian Rohatsch
Linesmen:
(Austria) Jakob Schauer
(Slovenia) Gašper Jaka Zgonc

Pretnar (Mitskevich) – 03:28	1–0
Antonov (PP) – 08:51	2–0
	2–1	13:08 – Roy (Fretter, Jämtin) (PP)
	2–2	18:18 – Roy (Aarssen)
Kogalev (Razvadovsky) – 23:07	3–2
	3–3	24:37 – Matheson (Wallace)
Yefimenko (Parfeyevets, Plotnikov) – 43:07	4–3
	4–4	52:13 – Matheson (Wallace)
Mikhnov (Zakharov, Corso) – 57:33	5–4

8 min
Penalties
16 min
40
Shots
23

14 January 2018; 15:00	Sheffield Steelers (United Kingdom)	2–0 (1–0, 1–0, 0–0)	(Italy) Ritten Sport	Čyžoŭka-Arena; Attendance: 350

Game reference
Ervīns Muštukovs	Goalies	Patrick Killeen	Referees: (Slovakia) Daniel Konc (Germany) Marian Rohatsch; Linesmen: (Belarus) Pavel Badyl (Belarus) Dmitry Golyak
Jämtin (Westerling, O'Connor) (PP) – 15:48 / 1–0; Westerling (Marquardt, O'Connor) – 33:38 / 2–0			Referees: (Slovakia) Daniel Konc (Germany) Marian Rohatsch; Linesmen: (Belarus) Pavel Badyl (Belarus) Dmitry Golyak
12 min	Penalties	12 min	Referees: (Slovakia) Daniel Konc (Germany) Marian Rohatsch; Linesmen: (Belarus) Pavel Badyl (Belarus) Dmitry Golyak
37	Shots	25	Referees: (Slovakia) Daniel Konc (Germany) Marian Rohatsch; Linesmen: (Belarus) Pavel Badyl (Belarus) Dmitry Golyak

14 January 2018; 19:00	Yunost Minsk (Belarus)	5–2 (2–1, 2–0, 1–1)	(Kazakhstan) Nomad Astana	Čyžoŭka-Arena; Attendance: 7,600

Game reference

Dmitri Milchakov
Goalies
Vladimir Kramar
Dmitri Malgin
Referees:
(Sweden) Marcus Linde
(Czech Republic) Vladimír Pešina
Linesmen:
(Switzerland) Dominik Altmann
(Austria) Jakob Schauer

Razvadovsky (PP, EA) – 03:24	1–0
	1–1	13:37 – Gurin (Lakiza) (PP2)
Zakharov (Razvadovsky) (PP2) – 19:47	2–1
Yefimenko (Goroshko) – 24:27	3–1
Razvadovsky – 37:45	4–1
	4–2	41:48 – Mikhailis (Gurkov)
Parfeyevets (Plotnikov) – 50:51	5–2

12 min
Penalties
16 min
29
Shots
33

== See also ==
- 2017–18 Champions Hockey League
