= Ján Kobezda =

Slovak ice hockey player

- Born: 31 July 1975; Ilava, Czechoslovakia
- Died: 27 January 2017 (aged 41); Trenčín, Slovakia
- Height: 6 ft 5 in (196 cm)
- Weight: 216 lb (98 kg; 15 st 6 lb)
- Position: Defense
- Shot: Left
- Played for: HK Dubnica; SK Matador Puchov; HK Dukla Trencin; Tallahassee Tiger Sharks; Fort Wayne Komets; Missouri River Otters; HC Vítkovice; Ilves; HC Slovan Bratislava; Skautafélag Akureyrar
- Playing career: 1994–2006

Ján Kobezda (31 July 1975 – 27 January 2017) was a Slovak professional ice hockey player who played with HC Slovan Bratislava in the Slovak Extraliga.

Kobezda died following a heart attack before the match against HC Košice on 27 January 2017. He was 41.

== Career statistics ==
			Regular season					Playoffs
Season	Team	League	GP	G	A	Pts	PIM	GP	G	A	Pts	PIM
1994–95	HK Spartak Dubnica	Slovak	33	0	2	2	45	3	0	0	0	0
1995–96	HK Spartak Dubnica	Slovak	39	3	1	4	58	—	—	—	—	—
1995–96	SK Matador Puchov	Slovak2	1	0	0	0	2	—	—	—	—	—
1996–97	HK Spartak Dubnica	Slovak	41	5	2	7	72	—	—	—	—	—
1997–98	HK Dukla Trencin	Slovak	40	5	4	9	36	—	—	—	—	—
1998–99	HK Spartak Dubnica	Slovak2	2	1	2	3	4	—	—	—	—	—
1998–99	Tallahassee Tiger Sharks	ECHL	60	6	14	20	56	—	—	—	—	—
1998–99	Fort Wayne Komets	IHL	4	0	0	0	4	—	—	—	—	—
1999–00	Missouri River Otters	UHL	43	2	5	7	48	—	—	—	—	—
2000–01	HC Vítkovice	Czech	4	0	0	0	0	—	—	—	—	—
2000–01	HK Dukla Trencin	Slovak	35	4	6	10	105	12	1	0	1	22
2001–02	Ilves	SM-liiga	5	0	0	0	12	—	—	—	—	—
2002–03	HC Slovan Bratislava	Slovak	10	0	0	0	2	—	—	—	—	—
2003–04	Skautafélag Akureyrar	Iceland	—	—	—	—	—	—	—	—	—	—
2004–05	Skautafélag Akureyrar	Iceland	—	—	—	—	—	—	—	—	—	—
2005–06	Skautafélag Akureyrar	Iceland	—	—	—	—	—	—	—	—	—	—
ECHL totals			60	6	14	20	56	—	—	—	—	—
Slovak totals			198	17	15	32	318	15	1	0	1	22
