= 2007–08 Icelandic Hockey League season =

The 2007–08 Icelandic Hockey League season was the 17th season of the Icelandic Hockey League, the top level of ice hockey in Iceland. Four teams participated in the league, and Skautafelag Akureyrar won the championship.

== Regular season ==
	Club	GP	S	OTW	OTL	L	GF:GA	Pts
1.	Skautafélag Reykjavíkur	18	16	0	0	2	167:53	48
2.	Skautafélag Akureyrar	18	11	0	0	7	132:61	33
3.	Ísknattleiksfélagið Björninn	18	9	0	0	9	133:94	27
4.	Narfi frá Hrísey	18	0	0	0	18	26:250	0

== Final ==
- Skautafélag Akureyrar - Skautafélag Reykjavíkur 3:1 (5:0 Forfeit, 4:0, 1:6, 9:5)
