= 2024–25 Icelandic Hockey League season =

2024–25 Icelandic Men's Hockey League
- League: Icelandic Men's Hockey League
- Sport: Ice hockey
- Duration: 6 September 2024 – 10 April 2025
- Number of teams: 4

Regular season
- Best record: Skautafélag Akureyrar

Finals
- Champions: Skautafélag Akureyrar (24th title)
- Runners-up: Skautafélag Reykjavíkur

Icelandic Men's Hockey League seasons
- ← 2023–24 2025–26 →

The 2024–25 Icelandic Men's Hockey League season was the 33rd season of the Icelandic Men's Hockey League, the top level of ice hockey in Iceland. The season ended on 10 April 2025 with Skautafélag Akureyrar clinching their 24th league title.

Narfi frá Hrísey did not enter a team for this season but the league added Skautafélag Hafnarfjarðar in their place.

== Regular season ==
=== Standings ===
Pos	Team	Pld	W	OTW	OTL	L	GF	GA	GD	Pts	Qualification
1	Skautafélag Akureyrar	18	11	2	1	4	77	60	+17	38	Qualification to Finals
2	Skautafélag Reykjavíkur	18	9	1	2	6	89	66	+23	31	Qualification to Finals
3	Fjölnir	18	7	3	1	7	77	64	+13	28	
4	Skautafélag Hafnarfjarðar	18	3	0	2	13	44	97	−53	11	

Source: IHI

=== Statistics ===
==== Scoring leaders ====
The following shows the top players who led the league in points, at the conclusion of the regular season.

Player	Team	GP	G	A	Pts	+/–	PIM
(Iceland) Axel Orongan	Skautafélag Reykjavíkur	17	15	20	35	+5	46
(Iceland) Viggó Hlynsson	Fjölnir	18	17	12	29	+9	24
(Iceland) Johann Leifsson	Skautafélag Akureyrar	18	13	13	26	+13	2
(Iceland) Kári Arnarsson	Skautafélag Reykjavíkur	18	12	14	26	+8	12
(Iceland) Sölvi Atlason	Skautafélag Reykjavíkur	17	10	15	25	+14	14
(Czech Republic) Martin Simanek	Fjölnir	15	8	15	23	+9	12
(Iceland) Hakon Magnusson	Skautafélag Reykjavíkur	16	13	8	21	+5	104
(Iceland) Alex Sveinsson	Skautafélag Reykjavíkur	17	8	11	19	+8	18

==== Leading goaltenders ====
The following shows the top goaltenders who led the league in goals against average, provided that they have played at least 40% of their team's minutes, at the conclusion of the regular season.

Player	Team	GP	TOI	GA	Sv%	GAA
(Latvia) Nikita Montvids	Fjölnir	15	905:33	43	91.40	2.85
(Canada) Tyler Szturm	Skautafélag Akureyrar	9	502:29	26	90.11	3.10
(Iceland) Robert Steingrimsson	Skautafélag Akureyrar	10	587:38	34	88.24	3.47
(Iceland) Johann Ragnarsson	Skautafélag Reykjavíkur	18	1081:11	63	89.86	3.50
(Czech Republic) Radek Haas	Skautafélag Hafnarfjardar	18	1051:49	87	89.91	4.96

== Finals ==
The top two teams at the end of the regular season qualify for the finals. Skautafélag Akureyrar swept the series against Skautafélag Reykjavíkur to claim their 24th league title and qualification to the 2025–26 IIHF Continental Cup.

=== (1) Skautafélag Akureyrar vs. (2) Skautafélag Reykjavíkur ===
5 April 2025	Skautafélag Reykjavíkur	4–7	Skautafélag Akureyrar	Skautahöllin Akureyri	Recap
Thorgils Eggertsson (1) – 5:45; Thorgils Eggertsson (1) – pp – 11:04		First period	1:21 – Unnar Rúnarsson (1); 12:31 – pp – Atli Sveinsson (1); 16:08 – Gunnar Arason (1)
Kári Arnarsson (1) – 13:27		Second period	17:42 – Unnar Rúnarsson (2); 18:28 – Johann Leifsson (1); 19:59 – pp – Gunnar Arason (2)
Kári Arnarsson (2) – pp – 13:49		Third period	19:09 – Johann Leifsson (2)
Johann Ragnarsson (40 saves / 47 shots)		Goalie stats	Robert Steingrimsson (21 saves / 25 shots)

8 April 2025	Skautafélag Akureyrar	3–1	Skautafélag Reykjavíkur	Skautahöllin Laugardal	Recap
Unnar Rúnarsson (3) – 5:14; Robert Hafberg (1) – pp – 13:13		First period	10:01 – Alex Sveinsson (1)
Uni Blöndal (1) – 19:58		Second period	No scoring
No scoring		Third period	No scoring
Robert Steingrimsson (22 saves / 23 shots)		Goalie stats	Johann Ragnarsson (23 saves / 26 shots)

10 April 2025	Skautafélag Reykjavíkur	1–6	Skautafélag Akureyrar	Skautahöllin Akureyri	Recap
Lukáš Dinga (1) – pp – 9:32		First period	12:40 – pp – Unnar Rúnarsson (4)
No scoring		Second period	2:50 – Unnar Rúnarsson (5); 14:48 – pp – Uni Blöndal (2); 17:44 – Johann Leifsson (2)
No scoring		Third period	1:29 – Ólafur Bjorgvinsson (1); 10:26 – pp – Andri Mikaelsson (1)
Johann Ragnarsson (33 saves / 39 shots)		Goalie stats	Robert Steingrimsson (20 saves / 21 shots)

Akureyrar won the series 3–0
