= 2004–05 Icelandic Hockey League season =

Icelandic ice hockey league season

The 2004–05 Icelandic Hockey League season was the 14th season of the Icelandic Hockey League, the top level of ice hockey in Iceland. Four teams participated in the league, and Skautafelag Akureyrar won the championship.

== Regular season ==
	Club	GP	W	T	L	GF:GA	Pts
1.	Skautafélag Reykjavíkur	18	13	1	4	137:71	27
2.	Skautafélag Akureyrar	18	11	2	5	129:107	24
3.	Ísknattleiksfélagið Björninn	18	5	1	12	90:119	11
4.	Narfi frá Hrísey	18	4	2	12	78:137	10

== Final ==
- Skautafélag Reykjavíkur - Skautafélag Akureyrar 1:3 (9:6, 2:6, 3:5, 1:7)
