= 2014 USL W-League season =

W-League
- Season: 2014
- Champions: Los Angeles Blues (4th Title)
- Regular Season title: Los Angeles Blues (3rd Title)
- Matches: 145
- Goals: 502 (3.46 per match)
- Best player: (United States) Mele French Los Angeles Blues
- Top goalscorer: (United States) Danica Evans Colorado Rush (13 Goals)
- Best goalkeeper: (Canada) Genevieve Richard Laval Comets
- Biggest home win: LAB 7, SED 0 (May 23); COR 7, SED 0 (July 11)
- Biggest away win: LAB 9, SED 0 (May 16); PRI 9, SED 0 (June 7)
- Highest scoring: LAB 9, SED 0 (May 16); PRI 9, SED 0 (June 7)
- Highest attendance: 4,598 WAS vs. BRSE (May 17)
- Lowest attendance: 35 LON vs. LAV (May 24)
- Average attendance: 324 (128 of 145 games reported)

The 2014 W-League season is the 20th season of the league's existence, and 11th season of second division women's soccer in the United States. The regular season started on May 10 and ended on July 13. The Los Angeles Blues won their fourth league championship, finishing the season undefeated and tie-free. They scored 63 goals and had only 6 scored against them in 15 regular season & playoff games.

== Changes from 2013 season ==
=== Name changes ===
One team changed their name in the off-season:

Team name	Metro area	Previous Name
Quebec Dynamo ARSQ	Quebec City area	Quebec City Amiral

=== Expansion teams ===
Five teams were added for the season:

Team name	Metro area	Location	Previous affiliation
(Virginia) Braddock Road Stars Elite	Northern Virginia	Fairfax, Virginia	expansion
Colorado Pride	Colorado Springs Metropolitan Statistical Area	Colorado Springs, Colorado	expansion
Colorado Storm	Denver-Aurora metropolitan area	Centennial, Colorado	expansion
(Florida) Gulf Coast Texans	Pensacola metropolitan area	Pensacola, Florida	WPSL
(Arizona) Sedona FC Strikers	Verde Valley region	Sedona, Arizona	expansion

=== Teams leaving ===
- Three teams folded or self-relegated following the 2013 season:
  - Fredericksburg Impact - Fredericksburg, Virginia
  - VSI Tampa Bay FC - Tampa, Florida
  - Virginia Beach Piranhas - Virginia Beach, Virginia

=== Merger ===
- Pali Blues merged with the Los Angeles Strikers to form the Los Angeles Blues.

== Standings ==
As of 7/13/2014
2014 W-League Champion
2014 Division Title
2014 Playoff Team

=== Northeastern Conference ===
Pos	Team	Pld	W	L	T	GF	GA	GD	Pts
1	Washington Spirit Reserves	12	10	0	2	36	5	+31	32
2	Braddock Road Stars Elite	12	5	6	1	21	24	−3	16
3	New York Magic	12	4	5	3	13	19	−6	15
4	New Jersey Wildcats	12	4	6	2	22	28	−6	14
5	Long Island Rough Riders	12	3	5	4	11	20	−9	13
6	North Jersey Valkyries	12	2	6	4	13	20	−7	10

=== Southeastern Conference ===
Pos	Team	Pld	W	L	T	GF	GA	GD	Pts
1	Gulf Coast Texans	10	5	1	4	23	11	+12	19
2	Charlotte Lady Eagles	10	5	1	4	18	11	+7	19
3	Carolina Elite Cobras	10	5	2	3	16	10	+6	18
4	Dayton Dutch Lions	10	3	7	0	16	29	−13	9
5	Atlanta Silverbacks Women	10	1	8	1	11	23	−12	4

=== Central Conference ===
Pos	Team	Pld	W	L	T	GF	GA	GD	Pts
1	Ottawa Fury Women	12	11	0	1	33	3	+30	34
2	K-W United FC	12	6	3	3	18	16	+2	21
3	Laval Comets	12	6	4	2	18	10	+8	20
4	Toronto Lady Lynx	12	4	3	5	12	18	−6	17
5	Quebec Dynamo ARSQ	12	1	8	3	13	25	−12	6
6	London Gryphons	12	0	10	2	6	28	−22	2

=== Western Conference ===
Pos	Team	Pld	W	L	T	GF	GA	GD	Pts
1	Los Angeles Blues	12	12	0	0	50	4	+46	36
2	Colorado Pride	12	9	2	1	38	7	+31	28
3	Seattle Sounders Women	12	7	4	1	28	19	+9	22
4	Colorado Rush	12	6	3	3	38	14	+24	21
5	Bay Area Breeze	12	6	5	1	17	11	+6	19
6	Santa Clarita Blue Heat	12	4	8	0	15	32	−17	12
7	Colorado Storm	12	1	11	0	13	47	−34	3
8	Sedona FC Strikers	12	0	12	0	3	68	−65	0

== Playoffs ==
The top two finishers in the Northeastern, Southeastern and Western Conferences and the top three finishers in the Central Conference will qualify for the conference playoffs. The conference winners will play for the 2014 W-League Championship, to be held July 25–27 at the IMG Academy in Bradenton, Florida.

=== Northeastern Conference Playoff ===
July 18, 2014
7:00pm EDT

(Washington, D.C.) Washington Spirit Reserves	6–0	(Virginia) Braddock Road Stars Elite
Herndon 9'; Cox 28'; Pardue 49', 83'; Bruder 76', 79'	Report

Maryland SoccerPlex
Boyds, Maryland
Attendance: 100
Referee: Danielle Chesky

=== Southeastern Conference Playoff ===
July 19, 2014
7:00pm EDT

(North Carolina) Charlotte Lady Eagles	2–2 (a.e.t.)	(Florida) Gulf Coast Texans
Naeher (yellow card) 30'; Fortune 41'; Lanter 45'	Report	Waters 17'; Hurd (yellow card) 40'; Jose-Rojas 69'; Cruz (yellow card) 87'
Penalties
Naeher (penalty scored); Fortune (penalty scored); Parr (penalty scored); O'Brien (penalty missed); Etten (penalty scored)	4–3	(penalty scored) Waters; (penalty scored) Arlitt; (penalty missed) Oram; (penalty scored) Hurd; (penalty missed) Gomez-Junco

Dickson Field
Charlotte, North Carolina
Attendance: 237
Referee: Christopher Spivey

=== Central Conference Playoffs ===
July 15, 2014
7:00pm EDT

(Ontario) K-W United FC	1–0	(Quebec) Laval Comets
Skeete 45+'; Lyon (yellow card) 67'	Report

Wilfrid Laurier University Stadium
Waterloo, Ontario
Attendance: 350
Referee: M. Beaudoin

July 19, 2014
3:00pm EDT

(Ontario) Ottawa Fury Women	4–0	(Ontario) K-W United FC
Rynier 37', 68'; Steinledge 49'; Moore 80'	Report	Skeete (yellow card) 62'; Wheldon (yellow card) 78'

Algonquin College Soccer Complex
Ottawa, Ontario
Attendance: 402
Referee: Tim Wong

=== Western Conference Playoff ===
July 19, 2014
7:30pm PDT

(California) Los Angeles Blues	2–1	Colorado Pride
Andrews 45'; Eddy 57'; Elby (yellow card) 70'; French (yellow card) 75'	Report	Weber 27'; King (yellow card) 72'; Logarzo (yellow card) 87'

Patterson Field
Los Angeles, California
Attendance: 245

== W-League Championship ==
=== Semi-finals ===
July 25, 2014
5:00pm EDT

(Ontario) Ottawa Fury Women	1–1 (a.e.t.)	(Washington, D.C.) Washington Spirit Reserves
Gilliland 90+'	Report	Herndon 63'
Penalties
Hastings (penalty scored); Raetzman (penalty missed); Gilliland (penalty scored); Mottershead (penalty missed)	2–4	(penalty scored) Herndon; (penalty scored) Pardue; (penalty scored) Huster; (penalty scored) Cuba

IMG Academy

July 25, 2014
7:30pm EDT

(California) Los Angeles Blues	4–0	(North Carolina) Charlotte Lady Eagles
Eddy 23', 84'; Smith (yellow card) 32'; Stengel 68', 71'	Report

IMG Academy
Referee: Tim Kluenker

=== Third Place Playoff ===
July 27, 2014
12:00pm EDT

(Ontario) Ottawa Fury Women	1–1 no (a.e.t.)	(North Carolina) Charlotte Lady Eagles
Raetzman 34'; McCarthy (yellow card) 38'	Report; Report	Fortune 45'
Penalties
Hastings (penalty scored); Gilliland (penalty scored); Steinlage (penalty scored); McCarthy (penalty scored)	4–1	(penalty missed) Naeher; (penalty missed) Fortune; (penalty scored) Parr

IMG Academy
Referee: Stephen Richardson

=== Championship ===
July 27, 2014
2:30pm EDT

(California) Los Angeles Blues	6–1	(Washington, D.C.) Washington Spirit Reserves
Stengel 18', 53'; French 45'; Killion 69'; Dydasco 78'; Nielsen 84'	Report; Report	Yensen 74'

IMG Academy
Referee: Janessa Gunn

Semi-Finals
1	Los Angeles Blues	4
4	Charlotte Lady Eagles	0
2	Ottawa Fury Women	1 (2)
3	Washington Spirit Reserves	1 (4)

Championship
1	Los Angeles Blues	6
3	Washington Spirit Reserves	1

== Statistical leaders ==
=== Top scorers ===
Rank	Player	Nation	Club	Goals
1	Danica Evans	USA	Colorado Rush	13
2	Mallory Weber	USA	Colorado Pride	11
3	Kennya Cordner	TRI	Seattle Sounders Women	8
3	Mele French	USA	Los Angeles Blues	8
3	Katie Stengel	USA	Los Angeles Blues	8
6	Laylla da Cruz	BRA	New Jersey Wildcats	7
6	Florence Dadson	GHA	Gulf Coast Texans	7
6	Rose Lavelle	USA	Dayton Dutch Lions	7
6	Civana Kuhlmann	USA	Colorado Rush	7
6	Sara Sanau Ruiz	SPA	New York Magic	7

== Awards ==
- Most Valuable Player: (United States) Mele French (LAB)
- Rookie of the Year: (Australia) Chloe Logarzo (PRI)
- Defender of the Year: (United States) Amanda Naeher (CHE)
- Coach of the Year: (Australia) Daniel Clitnovici (PRI)
- Goalkeeper of the Year: (Canada) Genevieve Richard (LAV)
- Playoff MVP: (United States) Sarah Killion (LAB)

== All-League and All-Conference Teams ==
=== Northeastern Conference ===
F: (United States) Ashley Herndon (WAS), (Philippines) Marisa Park (BRSE) *, (United States) Katie Yensen (WAS)
M: (Brazil) Laylla da Cruz (NJW), (Japan) Serina Kashimoto (NYM), (Colombia) Yoreli Rincón (NJW)
D: (United States) Sue Weber (LIR) *, (United States) Sam Lofton (WAS) *, (Jamaica) Satara Murray (WAS), (United States) Lorina White (NYM)
G: (United States) Samantha Depken (NYM)

=== Southeastern Conference ===
F: (Ghana) Florence Dadson (GCT), (United States) Jade Montgomery (CHE), (Chile) María José Rojas (GCT)
M: (Brazil) Leah Fortune (CHE), (United States) Rose Lavelle (DDL), (United States) Blakely Mattern (CAR) *
D: (United States) Lauren Gorodetsky (ATL), (United States) Renee Hurd (GCT), (United States) Kailey Mattison (CAR), (United States) Amanda Naeher (CHE) *
G: (United States) Robyn Jones (CHE)

=== Central Conference ===
F: (United States) Arin Gilliland (OTT), (Canada) Christabel Oduro (OTT), (Canada) Leticia Skeete (KWU)
M: (Canada) Catherine Charron-Delage (LAV), (Canada) Arielle Roy-Petitclerc (QUE), (Norway) Lisa-Marie Woods (OTT)
D: (Canada) Marissa Duguay (LAV), (Canada) Melanie Pickert (TOR), (Canada) Melissa Roy (QUE), (Canada) Shelina Zadorsky (OTT) *
G: (Canada) Genevieve Richard (LAV) *

=== Western Conference ===
F: (United States) Danica Evans (COR) *, (Australia) Chloe Logarzo (PRI) *, (United States) Mallory Weber (PRI)
M: (United States) Jessica Ayers (PRI), (United States) Mele French (LAB) *, (United States) Sarah Killion (LAB) *
D: (England) Rachel Daly (LAB), (United States) Danielle Johnson (BAB), (United States) Holly King (PRI), (United States) Kandace Wilson (LAB)
G: (Italy) Anna Maria Picarelli (SEA)

* denotes All-League player
