= 2008–09 Icelandic Hockey League season =

Hockey competition in Iceland

The 2008–09 Icelandic Hockey League season was the 18th season of the Icelandic Hockey League, the top level of ice hockey in Iceland. Three teams participated in the league, and Skautafelag Reykjavikur won the championship.

== Regular season ==
	Club	GP	S	OTW	OTL	L	GF:GA	Pts
1.	Skautafélag Akureyrar	20	16	0	0	4	113:67	48
2.	Skautafélag Reykjavíkur	20	10	1	0	9	97:113	32
3.	Ísknattleiksfélagið Björninn	20	3	0	1	16	75:105	10

== Final ==
- Skautafélag Akureyrar - Skautafélag Reykjavíkur 1:3 (5:6, 4:5, 5:4 n.V., 3:7)
