= 2009–10 Icelandic Hockey League season =

The 2009–10 Icelandic Hockey League season was the 19th season of the Icelandic Hockey League, the top level of ice hockey in Iceland. Three teams participated in the league, and Skautafelag Akureyrar won the championship.

== Regular season ==
	Club	GP	S	OTW	OTL	L	GF:GA	Pts
1.	Skautafélag Akureyrar	16	8	2	0	6	75:59	28
2.	Ísknattleiksfélagið Björninn	16	7	0	1	8	63:70	22
3.	Skautafélag Reykjavíkur	16	7	0	1	8	69:78	22

== Final ==
- Skautafélag Akureyrar - Ísknattleiksfélagið Björninn 3:2 (1:4, 7:4, 2:3 n.P., 3:2, 6:2)
