= 1999–2000 Icelandic Hockey League season =

Icelandic ice hockey league season

The 1999–00 Icelandic Hockey League season was the ninth season of the Icelandic Hockey League, the top level of ice hockey in Iceland. Three teams participated in the league, and Skautafelag Reykjavikur won the championship.

== Regular season ==
	Club	GP	W	T	L	GF:GA	Pts
1.	Skautafélag Reykjavíkur	6	5	0	1	51:28	10
2.	Skautafélag Akureyrar	6	4	0	2	52:35	8
3.	Ísknattleiksfélagið Björninn	6	0	0	6	22:62	0

== Final ==
- Skautafélag Reykjavíkur - Skautafélag Akureyrar 3:2 (5:6, 3:2, 5:2, 3:6, 5:4)
