= 1995–96 Icelandic Hockey League season =

The 1995–96 Icelandic Hockey League season was the fifth season of the Icelandic Hockey League, the top level of ice hockey in Iceland. Three teams participated in the league, and Skautafelag Akureyrar won the championship.

== Regular season ==
	Club	GP	W	T	L	GF:GA	Pts
1.	Skautafélag Akureyrar	4	3	0	1	39:16	6
2.	Skautafélag Reykjavíkur	4	3	0	1	35:13	6
3.	Ísknattleiksfélagið Björninn	4	0	0	4	10:55	0

== Final ==
- Skautafélag Akureyrar - Skautafélag Reykjavíkur 2:1 (2:3, 11:4, 7:4)
