= 1994–95 Icelandic Hockey League season =

Icelandic ice hockey league season

The 1994–95 Icelandic Hockey League season was the fourth season of the Icelandic Hockey League, the top level of ice hockey in Iceland. Four teams participated in the league, and Skautafelag Akureyrar won the championship.

== Regular season ==
	Club	GP	W	T	L	GF:GA	Pts
1.	Skautafélag Akureyrar	6	6	0	0	107:19	12
2.	Ísknattleiksfélagið Björninn	6	4	0	2	55:51	8
3.	Skautafélag Reykjavíkur	6	1	1	4	29:78	3
4.	Skautafélag Akureyrar II	6	0	1	5	22:81	1

== Final ==
- Skautafélag Akureyrar - Ísknattleiksfélagið Björninn 18:7, 11:5
