= Robbie Sigurðsson =

Icelandic ice hockey player

- Born: 18 October 1993 (age 31); Mars, Pennsylvania, USA
- Height: 183 cm (6 ft 0 in)
- Weight: 85 kg (187 lb; 13 st 5 lb)
- Position: Forward
- Shot: Right
- Played for: UMFK Esja; Skautafélag Reykjavíkur
- National team: Iceland
- Playing career: 2011–2019; 2021–2022

Robert Michael Sigurðsson (born 18 October 1993) is an American-born Icelandic ice hockey player and a former member of the Icelandic men's national team. In 2017, he was named the Icelandic Men's Ice Hockey Player of the Year.

== Playing career ==
Sigurðsson joined Skautafélag Reykjavíkur (SR) of the Icelandic Men's Hockey League during the 2011–12 season. He helped SR to the IHL finals where they lost to Skautafélagið Björninn. He returned to SR in 2014 and helped them once again to the IHL finals. In game 4 of the finals, Sigurðsson had to be transported by ambulance to a hospital after a hard hit. Without him and Daníel S. Magnússon, who was also injured, SR lost the finals to Skautafélag Akureyrar.

In 2017, Sigurðsson signed with reigning Icelandic champions UMFK Esja. In December 2017, he was named the Icelandic Men's Ice Hockey Player of the Year. For the 2017–18 season, he led the league in goals scored with 33, while coming in second to Jussi Sipponen in points with 61.

Sigurðsson returned to Skautafélag Reykjavíkur for the 2018–19 season. He led the league in points and helped SR to the IHL finals, where they lost to Skautafélag Akureyrar. Following SR's last game, he announced that he would not return the following season.

Later in 2019, Sigurðsson was hired as an assistant coach at Duquesne University.

After two seasons away, Sigurðsson joined SR again during the 2021–2022 season, appearing in regular season 10 matches, scoring 2 goals and having 4 assists. In four playoff matches, he had 1 goal and 2 assists.

== National team career ==
Sigurðsson has played for the Icelandic men's national team since 2017.

== Personal life ==
Sigurðsson is the son of Stefán Örn Sigurðsson, a former member of the Icelandic national football team, and American Laura Sigurðsson.
