= 2011–12 Icelandic Hockey League season =

The 2011–12 Icelandic Hockey League season was the 21st season of the Icelandic Hockey League, the top level of ice hockey in Iceland. Five teams participated in the league, and Ísknattleiksfélagið Björninn won the championship.

== Regular season ==
	Club	GP	W	OTW	OTL	L	Goals	Pts
1.	Skautafélag Reykjavíkur	16	12	2	1	1	109:55	41
2.	Ísknattleiksfélagið Björninn	16	10	0	2	4	97:56	36
3.	SA Vikingar	16	9	1	0	6	104:46	17
4.	SA Jötnar	16	3	1	1	11	46:125	14
5.	Hunar (Björninn II)	16	2	0	0	14	53:122	14

== Final ==
- Skautafélag Reykjavíkur - Ísknattleiksfélagið Björninn 2:3
