= 2006–07 Icelandic Hockey League season =

Icelandic ice hockey league season

The 2006–07 Icelandic Hockey League season was the 16th season of the Icelandic Hockey League, the top level of ice hockey in Iceland. Three teams participated in the league, and Skautafelag Reykjavikur won the championship.

== Regular season ==
	Club	GP	S	OTW	OTL	L	GF:GA	Pts
1.	Skautafélag Reykjavíkur	16	11	0	0	5	87:70	33
2.	Skautafélag Akureyrar	16	7	1	0	8	74:73	23
3.	Ísknattleiksfélagið Björninn	16	5	0	1	10	78:96	16

=== Final ===
- Skautafélag Reykjavíkur - Skautafélag Akureyrar 3:2 (2:5, 8:4, 1:2, 4:3, 3:2 n.P.)
