= 2012–13 Icelandic Hockey League season =

The 2012–13 Icelandic Hockey League season was the 22nd season of the Icelandic Hockey League, the top level of ice hockey in Iceland. Six teams participated in the league, and SA Vikingar won the championship.

== Regular season ==
	Club	GP	W	OTW	OTL	L	Goals	Pts
1.	SA Vikingar	16	12	2	1	1	85:33	41
2.	Ísknattleiksfélagið Björninn	16	10	2	1	1	99:42	35
3.	Hunar (Björninn II)	16	8	2	1	5	81:72	29
4.	SA Jötnar	16	9	0	1	6	86:64	28
5.	Fálkar Reykjavik	16	2	1	0	13	42:107	8
6.	Skautafélag Reykjavíkur	16	0	0	3	13	31:106	3

== Final ==
- SA Vikingar - Ísknattleiksfélagið Björninn 3:2 (3:4, 8:4, 5:4 SO, 3:4, 4:0)
