= 2000–01 Icelandic Hockey League season =

The 2000–01 Icelandic Hockey League season was the tenth season of the Icelandic Hockey League, the top level of ice hockey in Iceland. Four teams participated in the league, and Skautafelag Akureyrar won the championship.

== Regular season ==
	Club	GP	W	T	L	GF:GA	Pts
1.	Skautafélag Akureyrar	15	12	1	2	130:68	25
2.	Ísknattleiksfélagið Björninn	15	12	0	3	165:73	24
3.	Skautafélag Reykjavíkur	15	5	1	9	86:117	10
4.	Gulldrengir	15	0	0	15	38:161	0

== Final ==
- Skautafélag Akureyrar - Ísknattleiksfélagið Björninn 3:2 (3:4, 5:6, 11:4, 5:1, 6:5)
