= 2013–14 Icelandic Hockey League season =

Icelandic ice hockey league season

The 2010–11 Icelandic Hockey League season was the 23rd season of the Icelandic Hockey League, the top level of ice hockey in Iceland. SA Vikingar defeated Hunar in the championship round, 3-0.

== Regular season ==
Pl.		GP	W	OTW	OTL	L	Goals	Pts
1.	SA Vikingar	16	14	0	1	1	81:33	43
2.	Ísknattleiksfélagið Björninn	16	11	1	0	4	96:42	35
3.	Hunar (Björninn II)	16	9	0	1	6	72:64	28
4.	SA Jötnar (Akureyrar II)	16	5	1	0	10	53:82	17
5.	Fálkar (Reykjavíkur II)	16	5	0	0	11	47:70	15
6.	Skautafélag Reykjavíkur	16	2	0	0	14	33:91	6

== Final ==
- SA Vikingar - Ísknattleiksfélagið Björninn 3:0 (4:3, 6:1, 5:3)
