= 2005–06 Icelandic Hockey League season =

Icelandic ice hockey league season

The 2005–06 Icelandic Hockey League season was the 15th season of the Icelandic Hockey League, the top level of ice hockey in Iceland. Four teams participated in the league, and Skautafelag Reykjavikur won the championship.

== Regular season ==
	Club	GP	S	OTW	OTL	L	GF:GA	Pts
1.	Skautafélag Reykjavíkur	17	17	0	0	0	154:39	51
2.	Skautafélag Akureyrar	18	9	1	0	8	93:92	29
3.	Ísknattleiksfélagið Björninn	18	7	0	0	11	86:111	21
4.	Narfi frá Hrísey	17	1	0	1	15	38:129	4

== Playoffs ==
=== 3rd place ===
- Ísknattleiksfélagið Björninn - Narfi frá Hrísey 2:0 (7:1, 6:2)

=== Final ===
- Skautafélag Reykjavíkur - Skautafélag Akureyrar 3:0 (8:1, 7:4, 10:4)
