= 2010–11 Icelandic Hockey League season =

The 2010–11 Icelandic Hockey League season was the 20th season of the Icelandic Hockey League, the top level of ice hockey in Iceland. Four teams participated in the league and Skautafelag Akureyrar won the championship.

== Regular season ==
	Club	GP	S	OTW	OTL	L	GF:GA	Pts
1.	Skautafélag Akureyrar	18	12	2	1	3	111:51	41
2.	Skautafélag Reykjavíkur	18	11	1	1	5	94:71	36
3.	SA Jötnar	18	5	0	2	11	63:116	17
4.	Ísknattleiksfélagið Björninn	18	4	1	0	13	65:95	14

== Final ==
- Skautafélag Akureyrar - Skautafélag Reykjavíkur 3:2
