= 1992–93 Icelandic Hockey League season =

Icelandic ice hockey league season

The 1992–93 Icelandic Hockey League season was the second season of the Icelandic Hockey League, the top level of ice hockey in Iceland. Three teams participated in the league, and Skautafelag Akureyrar won the championship.

== Standings ==
	Club
1.	Skautafélag Akureyrar
2.	Skautafélag Reykjavíkur
3.	Skautafélagið Björninn
