= 1993–94 Icelandic Hockey League season =

Icelandic ice hockey league season

The 1993–94 Icelandic Hockey League season was the third season of the Icelandic Hockey League, the top level of ice hockey in Iceland. Three teams participated in the league, and Skautafelag Akureyrar won the championship.

== Regular season ==
	Club	GP	W	T	L	Pts
1.	Skautafélag Akureyrar	4	4	0	0	8
2.	Skautafélag Reykjavíkur	4	2	0	2	4
3.	Ísknattleiksfélagið Björninn	4	0	0	4	2

== Final ==
- Skautafélag Akureyrar - Skautafélag Reykjavíkur 2:1 (7:8 n.V., 6:3, 7:2)
