= Tracey Kevins =

English football coach

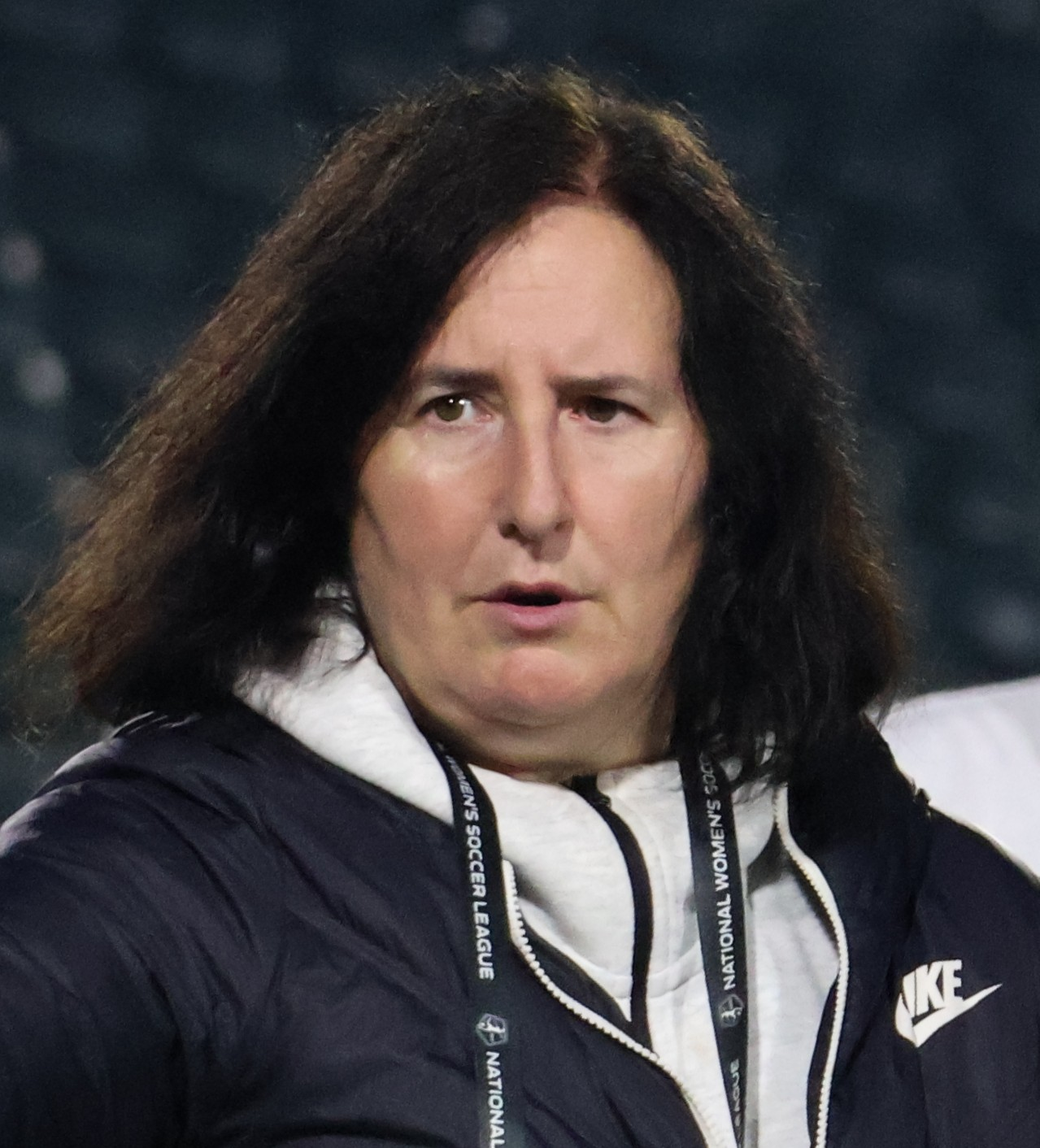
- Kevins in 2024

Personal information
- Full name: Tracey Marie Kevins
- Place of birth: London, England

Senior career*
Years	Team	Apps	(Gls)
1989–2003	Barnet Ladies	–	(–)

Managerial career
- 2004–2013: Barnet Ladies
- 2013: Los Angeles Strikers
- 2016–2017: Seattle Reign (assistant)
- 2017–2018: United States U-17 (assistant)
- 2019–2020: United States U-17
- 2021–2024: United States U-20
- * Club domestic league appearances and goals

Tracey Marie Kevins is an English association football coach who is the head of development for the women's youth national teams of the United States Soccer Federation (USSF).

Kevins played for hometown club Barnet Ladies before becoming their first-team manager in 2004. She led the club to the top division and multiple trophies, being named the FA Manager of the Year in 2010. She moved to the United States in 2013, eventually landing coaching roles with the USSF. She led the USWNT U-20 to the bronze medal the 2024 FIFA U-20 Women's World Cup.

== Early life ==
Kevins was born and raised in London. She played football growing up in the 1980s. In 1999, she got into coaching in Australia after dislocating her shoulder. She attended St Mary's University, Twickenham, and earned a Bachelor of Arts with honors in sports science and physical education. She also earned a UEFA "A" Coaching Licence.

== Career ==
Kevins was appointed first-team manager at Barnet Ladies in February 2004, having been part of the club as player, captain, or reserve team manager since 1989. During her nine years as manager, she led Barnet from the South East Combination League (third tier) to the FA Women's Premier League National Division (first tier at the time). She led the club to 11 trophies, including the FA Women's Premier League Cup in 2011, and reached consecutive FA Women's Cup semifinals in 2010 and 2011. She was named Manager of the Year at the FA Women's Football Awards in 2010. She left Barnet in February 2013.

Between 2005 and 2012, Kevins also worked for the FA with the under-15, under-17, under-19, and under-23 national teams. She had several stints as head coach and was an assistant coach for the under-19 teams that finished runners-up at the 2007 UEFA Women's Under-19 Championship and appeared at the 2008 FIFA U-20 Women's World Cup. She was also an assistant coach for the under-19 boys' teams at Barnet's rivals Wealdstone.

In March 2013, Kevins moved to the United States to become head coach of the Los Angeles Strikers in the USL W-League. She led the Strikers to their first playoff berth that season. In the W-League off-season, she mentored coaches at youth club LA Premier FC. In 2014, the Strikers merged with W-League champions Pali Blues to become the Los Angeles Blues, with Kevins becoming technical director and Charlie Naimo staying as head coach. That year, the Blues went 15–0 and were repeat W-League champions with aspirations to join the National Women's Soccer League (NWSL).

In February 2016, Kevins became the technical director for the newly established Seattle Reign Academy, working also as an assistant under first-team head coach Laura Harvey. She left the Reign to coach for the United States Soccer Federation (USSF). In July 2017, she was named the head coach of the United States under-15 team. She was also an assistant coach for the under-17 team in their victory at the 2018 CONCACAF Women's U-17 Championship and appearance at the 2018 FIFA U-17 Women's World Cup. She was promoted to head coach with the under-17s in 2019. The team was scheduled to play at the 2020 CONCACAF Women's U-17 Championship, but the tournament was cancelled due to the COVID-19 pandemic.

Kevins became head coach of the United States under-20 team in October 2021. The team rolled through the 2022 CONCACAF Women's U-20 Championship to the championship, with Michelle Cooper winning the tournament's Golden Ball and Golden Boot. Later that year, they exited in the group stage of the 2022 FIFA U-20 Women's World Cup. She kept her position for another cycle with the under-20s, finishing runner-up at the 2023 CONCACAF Women's U-20 Championship. She then led the team to third place at the 2024 FIFA U-20 Women's World Cup, their best result at the tournament since 2012, as Ally Sentnor won the tournament's Bronze Ball.

After two cycles with the under-20s, Kevins became the USSF's head of development for the women's youth national teams.
