= 1997–98 Icelandic Hockey League season =

The 1997–98 Icelandic Hockey League season was the seventh season of the Icelandic Hockey League, the top level of ice hockey in Iceland. Two teams participated in the league, and Skautafelag Akureyrar won the championship.

== Regular season ==
	Club	GP	W	T	L	GF:GA	Pts
1.	Skautafélag Akureyrar	2	2	0	0	10:5	4
2.	Ísknattleiksfélagið Björninn	2	0	0	2	5:10	0

== Final ==
- Skautafélag Akureyrar - Ísknattleiksfélagið Björninn 3:0 (7:6 n.V., 9:5, 11:3)
