= 2003–04 Icelandic Hockey League season =

The 2003–04 Icelandic Hockey League season was the 13th season of the Icelandic Hockey League, the top level of ice hockey in Iceland. Three teams participated in the league, and Skautafelag Akureyrar won the championship.

== Regular season ==
	Club	GP	W	T	L	GF:GA	Pts
1.	Skautafélag Akureyrar	12	12	0	0	87:47	24
2.	Skautafélag Reykjavíkur	12	5	1	6	69:70	11
3.	Ísknattleiksfélagið Björninn	12	0	1	11	59:98	1

== Final ==
- Skautafélag Akureyrar - Skautafélag Reykjavíkur 3:0 (5:2, 7:1, 6:1)
