= 2016 Orlando Pride season =

Orlando Pride
2016 season
- Owner: Flavio Augusto da Silva; Phil Rawlins
- Head coach: Tom Sermanni
- Stadium: Camping World Stadium
- National Women's Soccer League: 9th of 10
- 2016 NWSL Playoffs: Did not qualify
- Top goalscorer: Kristen Edmonds (6)
- Highest home attendance: 23,403 (April 23 vs. Houston)
- Lowest home attendance: 5,842 (July 10 vs. Boston)
- Average home league attendance: 8,785
Home colors	Away colors

The 2016 season was Orlando Pride's inaugural season. The team competes in the National Women's Soccer League, the top division of women's soccer in the United States.

== Team launch ==
The team was launched at a press conference held at Lake Eola Park in Downtown Orlando on October 20, 2015. At that time, it was announced that Tom Sermanni, previously the manager of both the Australian and United States women's national teams, would be the team's first manager. It was also announced that the team would share its home with Orlando City SC, beginning at Camping World Stadium in 2016, and eventually moving to Orlando City Stadium.

== Squad information ==
=== Coaching staff ===
Position	Staff
Head Coach	Tom Sermanni

Last updated: October 26, 2015
Source: Orlando Pride: Staff

=== Roster ===
The NWSL held an Expansion Draft to populate the Pride's roster on November 2, 2015. The Pride held the first pick in the 2016 NWSL College Draft, though it traded that pick to Portland Thorns FC in exchange for Alex Morgan and Kaylyn Kyle. It will get the first pick in the subsequent rounds of the College Draft. Orlando will also receive top priority in player discovery and the waiver wire.

Number	Nat.	Player	Position	Date of birth	Previous club	2016 NWSL appearances	2016 NWSL goals	2016 NWSL assists	Notes
Goalkeepers
1	(United States)	Ashlyn Harris	GK	October 19, 1985 (age 40)	(United States) Washington Spirit	10	0	0	–
19	(United States)	Aubrey Bledsoe	GK	November 20, 1991 (age 33)	(Denmark) Fortuna Hjørring	1	0	0	injured
25	(United States)	Kaitlyn Savage	GK	October 27, 1990 (age 35)	(New Zealand) Glenfield Rovers FC	2	0	0	–
Defenders
2	(United States)	Camille Levin	DF	April 24, 1990 (age 35)	(United States) Sky Blue FC	3	0	0	–
3	(United States)	Toni Pressley	DF	February 19, 1990 (age 35)	(United States) Houston Dash	8	0	0	–
5	(Australia)	Laura Alleway	DF	November 28, 1989 (age 35)	(Australia) Melbourne City	9	0	0	-
7	(Australia)	Steph Catley	DF	January 26, 1994 (age 31)	(Australia) Melbourne City	11	1	1	–
9	(Canada)	Josée Bélanger	DF	May 14, 1986 (age 39)	(Sweden) FC Rosengård	11	0	0	–
12	(United States)	Kristen Edmonds	DF	May 22, 1987 (age 38)	(United States) Western New York Flash	12	3	1	-
21	(Brazil)	Mônica	DF	April 21, 1987 (age 38)	(Brazil) Flamengo	11	0	0	–
Midfielders
6	(Canada)	Kaylyn Kyle	MF	October 6, 1988 (age 37)	(United States) Portland Thorns FC	10	0	0	–
14	(United States)	Becky Edwards	MF	May 22, 1988 (age 37)	(United States) Western New York Flash	11	0	0	–
16	(Brazil)	Leah Fortune	MF	December 13, 1990 (age 34)	(United States) Charlotte Lady Eagles	2	0	0	–
17	(United States)	Dani Weatherholt	MF	March 17, 1994 (age 31)	(United States) Santa Clara Broncos	5	0	0	–
18	(United States)	Maddy Evans	MF	April 21, 1991 (age 34)	(United States) Boston Breakers	10	0	0	–
26	(United States)	Samantha Witteman	MF	February 26, 1994 (age 31)	(United States) California Golden Bears	11	0	0	–
Forwards
4	(United States)	Jamia Fields	FW	September 24, 1993 (age 32)	(United States) Western New York Flash	7	0	0	–
8	(United States)	Sarah Hagen	FW	November 18, 1989 (age 35)	(United States) FC Kansas City	11	1	1	–
10	(England)	Lianne Sanderson	FW	February 3, 1988 (age 37)	(Cyprus) Apollon Limassol	8	2	1	transferred
10	(Australia)	Lisa De Vanna	FW	November 14, 1984 (age 41)	(Australia) Melbourne City	3	0	0
11	(Mexico)	Christina Burkenroad	FW	July 12, 1993 (age 32)	(United States) Cal State Fullerton	5	0	0	–
13	(United States)	Alex Morgan	FW	July 2, 1989 (age 36)	(United States) Portland Thorns FC	10	4	1	–
23	(United States)	Jasmyne Spencer	FW	August 27, 1990 (age 35)	(United States) Western New York Flash	13	4	1	–

=== Preseason non-roster invitees ===
No.	Position	Nation	Player
—	MF	BRA	Leah Fortune
—	GK	USA	Julia Kantor
—	FW	USA	Chelsea Leiva
—	MF	USA	Sierra Lelii
—	MF	USA	Kim Reynolds
—	DF	USA	Jackie Simpson
—	MF	USA	Lauren Smith
—	FW	USA	Allie Wisner

== NWSL College Draft ==
Draft picks are not automatically signed to the team roster. The 2016 NWSL College Draft was held on January 15, 2016. Orlando had three selections.

Round	Pick	Player	Pos.	College	Status
1	10	(United States) Samantha Witteman	DF	University of California, Berkeley	Signed
2	15	(Mexico) Christina Burkenroad	FW	(California) Cal State Fullerton	Signed
4	31	(United States) Dani Weatherholt	MF	(California) Santa Clara University	Signed

== Match results ==
Win Draw Loss

=== Preseason ===
March 19, 2016	Eastern Florida State	0–8	Orlando Pride	Melbourne, Florida
4:30pm		Report	Morgan 4' (pen.), 11', 37', 42'; Edmonds 17', 19'; Mônica 25'; Wisner 49'	Stadium: Titan Soccer Complex

March 22, 2016	Orlando Pride	5–1	University of Florida	Sanford, Florida
	Morgan 37', 54'; Hagen 51'; Burkenroad 64', 85'	Report	Bigic 90'	Stadium: Sylvan Lake Park; Attendance: Closed scrimmage

March 30, 2016	University of South Florida	0–3	Orlando Pride	Melbourne, Florida
		Report	Spencer 42'; Mônica 53'; Catley 74'	Stadium: Titan Soccer Complex

April 2, 2016	Orlando Pride	1–0	Florida State University	Orlando, Florida
	Sanderson 24'	Report		Stadium: Citrus Bowl
Note: Abandoned after 32mins due to weather

=== National Women's Soccer League ===
All times in regular season on Eastern Daylight Time (UTC-04:00).

It was announced on February 17, 2016, that the Pride would open their inaugural season on the road on April 17 at Portland Thorns FC, and would host Houston Dash for their home opener on April 23. The remainder of the schedule was released the next day.

The Pride's "local opponent" by league definition is the Houston Dash. They will play the Dash four times this year, and every other team home-and-away.

==== Results summary ====
Overall								Home						Away					
Pld	W	D	L	GF	GA	GD	Pts	W	D	L	GF	GA	GD	W	D	L	GF	GA	GD
20	6	1	13	20	30	−10	19	5	0	5	13	11	+2	1	1	8	7	19	−12

Last updated: September 24, 2016.
Source: Match reports

Round	1	2	3	4	5	6	7	8	9	10	11	12	13	14	15	16	17	18	19	20
Stadium	A	H	A	H	H	A	A	A	A	H	H	H	H	A	A	H	A	A	H	H
Result	L	W	L	W	W	W	L	L	L	W	L	W	L	L	L	L	L	D	L	L

Updated to match(es) played on September 24, 2016. Source: Match reports
A = Away; H = Home; W = Win; D = Draw; L = Loss

==== Results ====
April 17, 2016 1	Portland Thorns FC	2–1	Orlando Pride	Portland, Oregon
	Brynjarsdóttir 25'; Horan 81'	Report	Catley 12'	Stadium: Providence Park; Attendance: 16,073; Referee: Ekaterina Korolyova

April 23, 2016 2	Orlando Pride	3–1	Houston Dash	Orlando, Florida
7:30pm	Andressa 46' (o.g.); Sanderson 57'; Morgan 61'	Report	Andressa 75'	Stadium: Camping World Stadium; Attendance: 23,403; Referee: Brandon Artis

May 1, 2016 3	Chicago Red Stars	1–0	Orlando Pride	Bridgeview, Illinois
	Press 65'	Report		Stadium: Toyota Park; Attendance: 4,024; Referee: Victor Rivas

May 8, 2016 4	Orlando Pride	2–0	Seattle Reign FC	Orlando, Florida
5:00pm	Hagen 11'; Sanderson 87'	Report		Stadium: Camping World Stadium; Attendance: 8,211; Referee: Leszek Stalmach

May 14, 2016 5	Orlando Pride	1–0	Western New York Flash	Orlando, Florida
7:30pm	Morgan 79'	Report	Erceg (yellow card) 50' (yellow card) 89' (red card)	Stadium: Camping World Stadium; Attendance: 7,841; Referee: Levi Rippy

May 20, 2016 6	Houston Dash	0–1	Orlando Pride	Houston, Texas
		Report; Report	Edmonds 81' (Sanderson)	Stadium: BBVA Compass Stadium; Attendance: 6,293; Referee: Greg Dopka

May 28, 2016 7	FC Kansas City	2–0	Orlando Pride	Kansas City, Missouri
8:30pm	Averbuch 53' (unassisted); Tymrak 77' (Kastor)	Report		Stadium: Swope Soccer Village; Attendance: 3,104; Referee: Margaret Domka

June 11, 2016 8	Western New York Flash	1–0	Orlando Pride	Rochester, New York
	Makenzy Doniak 4' (Jessica McDonald); Meredith Speck (yellow card) 45+'; Michaela Hahn (yellow card) 83'	Report	Jasmyne Spencer (yellow card) 76'	Stadium: Sahlen's Stadium; Attendance: 4,526; Referee: Elvis Mahmutovic

June 18, 2016 9	Washington Spirit	2–0	Orlando Pride	Boyds, Maryland
	Estefania Banini 9'; Shelina Zadorsky (yellow card) 11'; Francisca Ordega 40'	Report		Stadium: Maryland SoccerPlex; Attendance: 5,750; Referee: Christopher Spivey

June 23, 2016 10	Orlando Pride	1–0	Houston Dash	Orlando, Florida
7:30pm	Spencer 91' (Hagen)			Stadium: Camping World Stadium; Attendance: 6,870; Referee: Marco Vega

June 26, 2016 11	Orlando Pride	1–2	Portland Thorns FC	Orlando, Florida
5:00pm	Jasmyne Spencer 67' (unassisted); Laura Alleway (yellow card) 78'; Kaylyn Kyle (yellow card) 89'	Report	Dagný Brynjarsdóttir 25' (Tobin Heath); Dagný Brynjarsdóttir (yellow card) 45'; Lindsey Horan 81' (Tobin Heath); Meghan Klingenberg (yellow card) 87'	Stadium: Camping World Stadium; Attendance: 7,143; Referee: Ekaterina Koroleva

July 10, 2016 12	Orlando Pride	2–1	Boston Breakers	Orlando, Florida
5:00pm	Jasmyne Spencer (yellow card) 21'; Kristen Edmonds 90', 93+' (Leah Fortune)	Report	Mollie Pathman 5'; Brooke Elby (yellow card) 34' (yellow-red card) 89'; Louise Schillgard (yellow card) 49'; Jami Kranich (yellow card) 93+'	Stadium: Camping World Stadium; Attendance: 5,842; Referee: Jon Freemon

July 16, 2016 13	Orlando Pride	0–1	Chicago Red Stars	Orlando, Florida
7:30pm	Maddy Evans (yellow card) 94+'	Report	Taylor Comeau 23' (Sofia Huerta); Arin Gilliland (yellow card) 44'	Stadium: Camping World Stadium; Attendance: 7,247; Referee: Victor Rivas
Note: lightning delayed at minute 74 for 1 hour

July 23, 2016 14	Seattle Reign FC	5–2	Orlando Pride	Seattle, Washington
	Kim Little 21' (penalty); Jessica Fishlock 30' (unassisted); Manon Melis 47' (unassisted); Kendall Fletcher 56' (Lauren Barnes); Kiersten Dallstream (yellow card) 81'; Own Goal 87' (Toni Pressley)	Report	Jasmyne Spencer 52' (Jamia Fields); Kristen Edmonds 89' (Sarah Hagen)	Stadium: Memorial Stadium; Attendance: 5,103; Referee: Christopher Spivey

July 31, 2016 15	Boston Breakers	1–0	Orlando Pride	Boston, Massachusetts
	Natasha Dowie 10' (unassisted); Louise Schillgard (yellow card) 29'	Report	Toni Pressley (yellow card) 90'	Stadium: Jordan Field; Attendance: 4,379; Referee: Leszek Stalmach

August 26, 2016 16	Orlando Pride	1–2	Washington Spirit	Orlando, Florida
7:30pm	Toni Pressley (yellow card) 28'; Sarah Hagen 71' (Cami Levin)	Report	Ali Krieger (yellow card) 35'; Cheyna Williams 37' (Caprice Dydasco); Christine Nairn 57' (Katie Stengel)	Stadium: Camping World Stadium; Attendance: 7,052; Referee: Marco Vega

September 3, 2016 17	Houston Dash	4–2	Orlando Pride	Houston
	Janine Beckie 24' (Carli Lloyd); Polina 49' (unassisted); Kealia Ohai 62' (unassisted), 95+' (J Becky); Cari Roccaro (yellow card) 76'; Amber Brooks (yellow card) 79'	Report	Alex Morgan 80' (K Edmonds) (yellow card) 78'; Kristen Edmonds 87' (unassisted)	Stadium: BBVA Compass Stadium; Attendance: 6,819; Referee: Ekaterina Koroleva

September 7, 2016 18	Sky Blue FC	1–1	Orlando Pride	Piscataway, New Jersey
	Sam Kerr 80'; Nikki Stanton (yellow card) 90+'	Report	Alex Morgan 23' (Maddy Evans)	Stadium: Yurcak Field; Attendance: 2,055; Referee: Matthew Franz

September 10, 2016 19	Orlando Pride	1–2	Sky Blue FC	Orlando, Florida
7:30pm	Kristen Edmonds 42' (unassisted); Toni Pressley (yellow card) 70'	Report	Sam Kerr 48' (unassisted); Christie Rampone (yellow card) 49'; Maya Hayes 53' (unassisted)	Stadium: Camping World Stadium; Attendance: 6,788; Referee: Danielle Chesky

September 24, 2016 20	Orlando Pride	1–2	FC Kansas City	Orlando, Florida
5:00pm	Jasmyne Spencer 16' (unassisted)	Report	Tiffany McCarty 47' (unassisted); Alex Arlitt (yellow card) 80'; Heather O'Reilly 84' (penalty); Frances Silva (yellow card) 91+'	Stadium: Camping World Stadium; Attendance: 7,454; Referee: Margaret Domka

==== League standings ====
Pos	Team	Pld	W	D	L	GF	GA	GD	Pts	Qualification
1	Portland Thorns FC	20	12	5	3	35	19	+16	41	NWSL Shield
2	Washington Spirit	20	12	3	5	30	21	+9	39	NWSL Playoffs
3	Chicago Red Stars	20	9	6	5	24	20	+4	33	NWSL Playoffs
4	Western New York Flash (C)	20	9	5	6	40	26	+14	32	NWSL Playoffs
5	Seattle Reign FC	20	8	6	6	29	21	+8	30	
6	FC Kansas City	20	7	5	8	18	20	−2	26	
7	Sky Blue FC	20	7	5	8	24	30	−6	26	
8	Houston Dash	20	6	4	10	29	29	0	22	
9	Orlando Pride	20	6	1	13	20	30	−10	19	
10	Boston Breakers	20	3	2	15	14	47	−33	11	

Source: NWSL
Rules for classification: Tiebreakers
(C) Champions

== Honors and awards ==
=== NWSL Awards ===
==== NWSL Team of the Year ====
Team	Position	Player	Ref.
Best XI	Goalkeeper	(United States) Ashlyn Harris	

==== NWSL Goalkeeper of the Year ====
Player	Saves	Goals-Against-Average	Appearances	Ref.
(United States) Ashlyn Harris	62	1.33	15	

=== NWSL Weekly Awards ===
==== NWSL Player of the Week ====
Week	Result	Player	Ref.
12	Won	(United States) Kristen Edmonds	

==== NWSL Goal of the Week ====
Week	Result	Player	Ref.
1	Won	(Australia) Steph Catley	
5	Won	(United States) Alex Morgan	
10	Won	(United States) Jasmyne Spencer	
12	Won	(United States) Kristen Edmonds	
17	Won	(United States) Alex Morgan	

==== NWSL Save of the Week ====
Week	Result	Player	Ref.
2	Won	(United States) Ashlyn Harris	
3	Won	(United States) Ashlyn Harris	
4	Won	(United States) Ashlyn Harris	
6	Won	(United States) Ashlyn Harris	
8	Won	(United States) Ashlyn Harris	
9	Won	(United States) Ashlyn Harris	
10	Won	(United States) Ashlyn Harris	
18	Won	(United States) Ashlyn Harris	

== Media ==
All NWSL matches not aired through their national contract with Fox Sports 1 are livestreamed on the NWSL's YouTube channel. Orlando Pride home matches are being called by Orlando City play-by-play announcer Jeff Radcliffe and color commentator Becky Burleigh, head coach of the Florida Gators women's soccer team.

== Squad statistics ==
Source: NWSL

N	Pos	Player	GP	GS	Min	G	A	PK	Shot	SOG	SOG%	Cro	CK	Off	Foul	FS	YC	RC
5	DF	Laura Alleway	11	9	781	0	0	0	6	3	50%	0	1	0	4	3	2	0
9	FW	Josee Belanger	14	14	1084	0	0	0	3	1	33%	2	0	0	13	13	2	0
19	GK	Aubrey Bledsoe	1	1	90	0	0	0	0	0	—	0	0	0	0	0	0	0
11	MF	Christina Burkenroad	7	2	253	0	0	0	0	0	—	0	0	2	4	1	0	0
7	DF	Stephanie Catley	11	11	990	1	1	0	9	6	67%	11	22	1	8	10	0	0
10	FW	Lisa De Vanna	3	2	154	0	0	0	3	1	33%	0	0	2	1	3	0	0
12	MF	Kristen Edmonds	19	19	1701	6	2	0	30	16	53%	6	41	1	8	22	1	0
14	MF	Becky Edwards	16	10	808	0	0	0	4	2	50%	0	0	0	13	7	1	0
18	DF	Maddy Evans	16	12	1108	0	1	0	9	3	33%	2	0	0	15	15	2	0
4	MF	Jamia Fields	12	6	627	0	1	0	6	1	17%	6	0	3	8	3	0	0
16	FW	Leah Fortune	3	0	43	0	1	0	1	0	0%	0	0	0	0	0	0	0
8	FW	Sarah Hagen	17	8	587	2	2	0	9	7	78%	0	0	1	2	6	0	0
1	GK	Ashlyn Harris	15	15	1350	0	0	0	0	0	—	0	0	0	0	1	0	0
21	DF	Monica Hickmann	16	15	1376	0	0	0	4	2	50%	2	0	0	7	0	0	0
6	MF	Kaylyn Kyle	18	16	1436	0	0	0	5	1	20%	0	1	5	18	9	2	0
2	DF	Cami Levin	10	9	836	0	1	0	2	1	50%	2	0	2	1	5	0	0
13	FW	Alex Morgan	15	15	1350	4	1	0	44	20	45%	3	0	10	7	19	1	0
3	DF	Toni Pressley	14	11	1027	0	0	0	8	1	13%	0	5	1	12	4	2	0
10	FW	Lianne Sanderson	8	3	419	2	1	0	7	3	43%	2	12	1	5	11	0	0
26	GK	Kaitlyn Savage	4	4	360	0	0	0	0	0	—	0	0	0	0	0	0	0
23	FW	Jasmyne Spencer	20	17	1564	4	0	0	30	18	60%	7	0	15	12	33	2	0
17	MF	Dani Weatherholt	12	9	786	0	0	0	7	3	43%	2	0	0	9	5	0	0
26	DF	Sam Witteman	16	12	1070	0	0	0	7	4	57%	7	0	0	8	17	0	0
Team Total			20	—	19800	19	11	0	194	93	48%	52	82	44	155	187	15	0

N	Pos	Goal keeper	GP	GS	Min	GA	GA/G	PKA	PKF	Shot	SOG	Sav	Sav%	YC	RC
19	GK	Aubrey Bledsoe	1	1	90	2	2.00	0	0	11	4	2	50%	0	0
1	GK	Ashlyn Harris	15	15	1350	20	1.33	1	1	161	82	62	76%	0	0
25	GK	Kaitlyn Savage	4	4	360	8	2.00	1	1	50	26	19	73%	0	0
Team Total			20	—	1800	30	1.50	2	2	222	112	83	74%	0	0

== Images ==
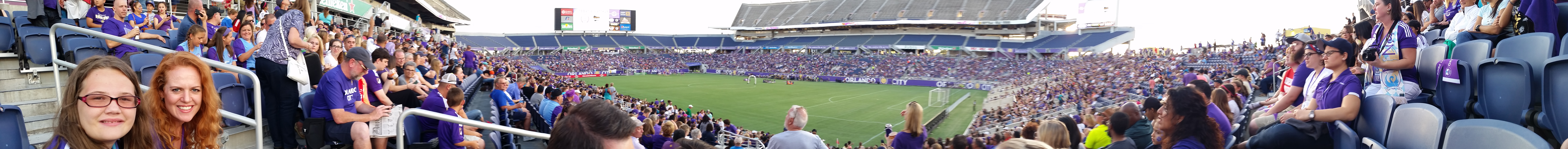
April 23, 2016, a NWSL record crowd of 23,403 at Camping World Stadium on Orlando Pride's first Home Game.
