= Sierra Lelii =

American/Italian soccer player (born 1993)

Personal information
- Full name: Sierra Marie Lelii
- Date of birth: May 4, 1993 (age 33)
- Place of birth: Seminole, Florida
- Height: 5 ft 7 in (1.70 m)
- Positions: Striker; winger

Team information
- Current team: Þróttur

College career
Years	Team	Apps	(Gls)
2011–2015	Nova Southeastern Sharks		(35)

Senior career*
Years	Team	Apps	(Gls)
2016	Orlando Pride	0	(0)
2016	Skövde KIK	6	(3)
2017	Þróttur	18	(7)
2019	Haukar	18	(9)
2021	SR	5	(2)
2022	KÁ	0	(0)
2022	ÍH	5	(5)
2023	Þróttur	0	(0)
- * Club domestic league appearances and goals as of 31 March 2023

Sierra Marie Lelii (born May 4, 1993) is an American/Italian soccer player who plays as a striker/midfielder for Þróttur in the Icelandic top-tier Besta deild kvenna.

== Early life ==
Born and raised in Seminole, Florida, Lelii attended Seminole High School where she scored 74 goals and recorded 40 assists during her high school career. In January 2010, she helped the team win the Class 5A state title.

=== College ===
Lelii attended Nova Southeastern University between 2011 and 2015, playing four seasons for the Nova Southeastern Sharks in the Sunshine State Conference (SSC), injury redshirting in her junior year. As a senior in 2015, Lelii was an All-American and All-Region selection, winning multiple All-Conference awards including SSC Offensive Player of the Year. She set the new program single-season goals record and led the SSC in goals with 18.

== Playing career ==
=== Orlando Pride ===
Lelii was called into Orlando Pride preseason camp on March 14, 2016. She played in all of the team's preseason games and was named to the amateur squad ahead of the 2016 season. On July 10, 2016, Lelii was promoted to the first team roster following the temporary loss of six Pride players to their respective Olympic teams. She was named in the matchday squads for games against the Boston Breakers, Chicago Red Stars and Seattle Reign FC but did not play.

=== Skövde ===
In August 2016, Lelii signed with Skövde KIK, a non-league team in Skövde, Sweden. She made her debut for the club on August 20, scoring a goal and registering an assist in a 5–3 win over Skepplanda BTK. In six appearances for the team, Lelii scored three goals and made five assists.

=== Þróttur ===
On March 16, 2017, Lelii signed with Icelandic 1. deild club Þróttur based in Reykjavík. She worked as a strength and conditioning coach alongside playing.

=== Haukar ===
In February 2019, Lelii joined fellow 1. deild club Haukar.

=== SR ===
In 2021, Lelii signed with Skautafélag Reykjavíkur of the Icelandic 2. deild.

=== Þróttur ===
In January 2023, Lelii signed with Þróttur again.

== Career statistics ==
Club	Season	League			Cup		Total	
Club	Season	Division	Apps	Goals	Apps	Goals	Apps	Goals
Orlando Pride	2016	NWSL	0	0	0	0	0	0
Skövde KIK	2016	Div 1 Norra Götaland	6	3	0	0	6	3
Þróttur	2017	1. deild	18	7	3	2	21	9
Haukar	2019	1. deild	18	9	2	2	20	11
Career total			42	19	5	4	47	23
