= 2014 W-League =

2014 W-League might refer to:

- 2014 W-League (Australia)
- 2014 USL W-League season
