= 1991–92 Icelandic Hockey League season =

Icelandic ice hockey league season

The 1991–92 Icelandic Hockey League season was the inaugural season of the top level ice hockey league of Iceland, featuring three teams. Skautafelag Akureyrar won the inaugural championship.
