= Erika Prado =

American soccer player

Personal information
- Full name: Erika Prado
- Date of birth: August 1, 1984 (age 42)
- Place of birth: West Covina, California, United States
- Height: 5 ft 1 in (1.55 m)
- Position: Midfielder

College career
Years	Team	Apps	(Gls)
2005	Pasadena City College		
2006–2007	Cal State Los Angeles		

Senior career*
Years	Team	Apps	(Gls)
- Los Angeles Premier
2008	Pali Blues	7	(0)
- FC Indiana
2011–2012	Energiya Voronezh	3	(0)
- * Club domestic league appearances and goals

Erika Prado is an American women's soccer midfielder of Mexican descent, And had played for Energiya Voronezh in the Russian Championship.

She previously played in W-League's Pali Blues and FC Indiana.
