= UMFK Esja =

Esja Reykjavík
- City: Reykjavík, Iceland
- Founded: 2014
- Folded: 2018
- Colours: Green, white

UMFK Esja, also known as Esja Reykjavík, was an ice hockey team in Reykjavík, Iceland, founded in 2014. The team played in the Icelandic Men's Hockey League from 2014 to 2018, winning the national championship in 2017. On 27 February 2018, the club announced it would not field a team for the upcoming 2018–2019 season due to the refusal of the Ice Hockey Association of Iceland and Reykjavík's Athletic Federation to allow the club to start a junior program, which they claimed was essential for the club's future.

== Titles ==
- Icelandic champions: 2017

== Notable players ==
- Robbie Sigurðsson
