= Esthefanny Barreras =

Mexican footballer (born 1996)

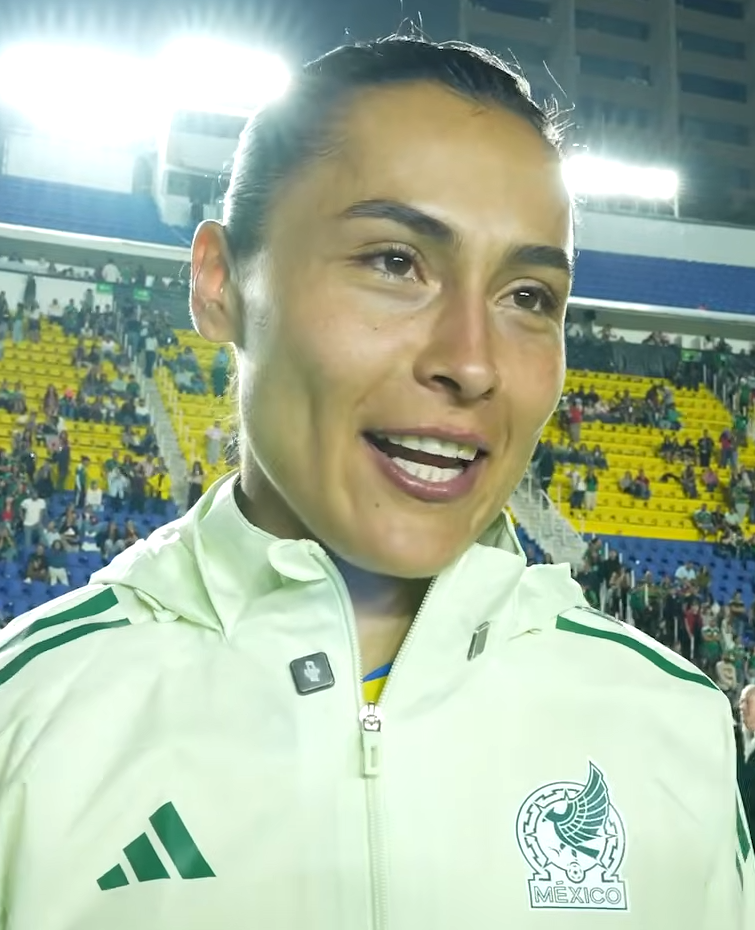
- Barreras with Mexico in 2026

Personal information
- Full name: Esthefanny Barreras Torres
- Date of birth: 2 November 1996 (age 29)
- Place of birth: Phoenix, Arizona, U.S.
- Height: 1.78 m (5 ft 10 in)
- Position: Goalkeeper

Team information
- Current team: Pachuca
- Number: 1

Youth career
- 2014: Alhambra Lions

College career
Years	Team	Apps	(Gls)
2015	EFSC Titans	18	(0)
2017	Phoenix Bears	20	(0)
2018–2019	West Florida Argonauts	39	(0)

Senior career*
Years	Team	Apps	(Gls)
2015	Arizona Strikers		
2021–	Pachuca	191	(0)

International career^{‡}
2012	Mexico U-17	0	(0)
2016	Mexico U-20	1	(0)
2016–	Mexico	28	(0)
Medal record
Women's football
Representing Mexico
Pan American Games
Gold medal – first place	2023 Santiago	Team
- * Club domestic league appearances and goals as of 12 March 2026 ‡ National team caps and goals as of 12 March 2026

Esthefanny Barreras Torres (born 2 November 1996) is a footballer who plays as goalkeeper for Liga MX Femenil club Pachuca. Born in the United States, she plays for the Mexico national team.

== International career ==
Barreras was part of the Mexican squads which competed at the 2012 FIFA U-17 Women's World Cup and the 2016 FIFA U-20 Women's World Cup, but she only played in the latter, once. She made her senior debut on 26 January 2016 in a 1–0 victory against Vietnam at the Four Nations Tournament of that year.

Barreras was selected to represent Mexico at the 2023 Pan American Games held in Santiago, Chile, where the Mexican squad went undefeated to win the gold medal for the first time in their history at the Pan American Games, defeating Chile 1–0.
