= Pali Blues =

Former women's soccer team

- Full name: Pali Blues Soccer Club
- Nicknames: The Blues, Pali
- Founded: 2008
- Stadium: Stadium-by-the-Sea
- Capacity: 4,000
- Chairman: Maryam Mansouri
- Head coach: Charlie Naimo
- League: USL W-League
- 2014: 1st, Western Conference; Playoffs: Champions
Home colors	Away colors

Pali Blues was an American women's soccer team, which played from 2008 to 2014. The team was a member of the United Soccer Leagues USL W-League, the second tier of women's soccer in the United States and Canada. The team played in the Western Conference against Colorado Force, Colorado Rush, LA Strikers, Santa Clarita Blue Heat, Seattle Sounders Women, Vancouver Whitecaps FC and Victoria Highlanders Women.

The team played its home games in the "Stadium-by-the-Sea" at Palisades High School (nicknamed “Pali”) in the Pacific Palisades area of Los Angeles, California. The club's colors were pale blue, orange and white and was a sister club to the Los Angeles Blues of the USL Pro league.

The club enjoyed robust fan support from the Tony Danza Army, their official supporters group. The "Stadium By The Sea" was widely considered one of the toughest places to play in the W-League, confirmed by Blues coach Charlie Naimo, who called the Tony Danza Army's support the best he has seen in the United Soccer Leagues.

The Blues won their first W-League title in their debut season, beating FC Indiana 2–1 in the W-League Championship game in Virginia Beach, Virginia on August 2, 2008. They would repeat as champions by defeating the Washington Freedom Reserves 2–1 in Germantown, Maryland on August 7, 2009.

Before winning their first W-League title in August, the Pali Blues won the Las Vegas Silver Mug Tournament over Ajax America Women with one goal on February 10, 2008. Their first official game as a team was the first game of the Silver Mug tournament against Ajax America Women on February 9, 2008. The Blues scored a winning goal and moved on to defeat the Athleticos 8-0, the Legacy 9-0 and the Denver Diamonds 4-2. In the semifinal round the Blues defeated the West Coast Soccer Club with one goal.

In November 2014, the Blues announced that they would no longer compete in the W-League so the owners could focus their efforts on their USL franchise.

== Players ==
=== Final 2014 roster ===
Current at end of 2014. Note: Flags indicate national team as defined under FIFA eligibility rules; some limited exceptions apply. Players may hold more than one non-FIFA nationality.

No.	Pos.	Nation	Player
13	DF	CAN	Sasha Andrews
12	GK	RSA	Roxanne Barker
15	FW	USA	Megan Borman
21	GK	USA	Maddie Clarefield
24	MF	USA	Daphne Corboz
2	DF	USA	Abby Dahlkemper
6	FW	USA	Makenzy Doniak
3	DF	USA	Caprice Dydasco
4	MF	USA	Elizabeth Eddy
19	DF	ITA	Alia Guagni
8	DF	USA	Kassey Kallman
18	DF	ITA	Viviana Schiavi
20	MF	USA	Kelsea Smith

No.	Pos.	Nation	Player
14	FW	USA	Jamia Fields
29	FW	USA	Mele French
7	DF	USA	Ashley Freyer
5	DF	USA	Kasey Johnson
10	MF	USA	Sarah Killion
16	MF	USA	Ashley Nick
34	MF	USA	Jenna Richmond
9	FW	ENG	Chioma Ubogagu
25	DF	USA	Lynn Williams

=== Coaching staff ===
- Head Coach: Charlie Naimo
- Associate Head Coach: Shayon Jalayer
- Assistant Coach: Tracey Kevins
- Goalkeeper Coach: Brett Borm

=== Notable former players ===
The following former Blues have played at the professional and/or international level:

- (United States) Danesha Adams
- (Canada) Sasha Andrews
- (England) Karen Bardsley
- (United States) Liz Bogus
- (Belgium) Janice Cayman
- (England) Leanne Champ
- (United States) Lauren Cheney
- (United States) Carrie Dew
- (United States) Whitney Engen
- (United States) Kendall Fletcher
- (United States) Lauren Fowlkes
- (United States) Mele French
- (Italy) Sara Gama
- (United States) Ashlyn Harris
- (United States) Tobin Heath
- (United States) Valerie Henderson
- (Finland) Tuija Hyyrynen
- (United States) Brittany Klein
- (Canada) Kara Lang
- (United States) Amy LePeilbet
- (United States) Camille Levin
- (United States) Manya Makoski
- (Australia) Collette McCallum
- (Mexico) Iris Mora
- (United States) Alex Morgan
- (Australia) Kate Munoz
- (United States) Jill Oakes
- (United States) Kelley O'Hara
- (Denmark) Cathrine Paaske-Sørensen
- (Italy) Ilaria Pasqui
- (United States) Erika Prado
- (United States) Christen Press
- (New Zealand) Ali Riley
- (Denmark) Julie Rydahl Bukh
- (Guyana) Chanté Sandiford
- (United States) Rosie Tantillo
- (England) Jodie Taylor
- (United States) India Trotter
- (United States) Aricca Vitanza
- (Australia) Sarah Walsh
- (United States) Nikki Washington
- (United States) Michelle Wenino
- (United States) Kandace Wilson
- (New Zealand) Kirsty Yallop

2008 roster, 2009 roster, 2010 roster, 2011 roster, 2012 roster 2013 roster, 2014 roster

== Year-by-year ==
Year	Division	League	Reg. season	Playoffs
2008	1	USL W-League	1st, Western	Champions
2009	2	USL W-League	1st, Western	Champions
2010	2	USL W-League	2nd, Western	Western Finals
2011	2	USL W-League	3rd, Western	Did not qualify
2012	2	USL W-League	1st, Western	Finals
2013	2	USL W-League	1st, Western	Champions
2014	2	USL W-League	1st, Western	Champions

== Honors ==
- USL W-League Champions 2008, 2009, 2013, 2014
- USL W-League Regular Season Champions 2008, 2012, 2014
- USL W-League Western Conference Champions 2008, 2009, 2012, 2013, 2014
- Las Vegas Silver Mug Tournament Champions 2008
