= Bay Area Breeze =

- Full name: Bay Area Breeze
- Founded: 2011
- Dissolved: 2014
- Ground: Pioneer Stadium; Hayward, California
- Capacity: 5,000
- League: W-League
- 2014: 5th, Western Conference; Playoffs: DNQ
- Website: http://www.bayareabreeze.com
Home colors	Away colors

Bay Area Breeze was a professional American women's soccer team. Founded in 2011, the team was based in Hayward, California. The team played in the Western Conference of the W-League. The team's colors were blue, white and green.

== History ==
The Bay Area Breeze originally played in the Women's Premier Soccer League. They won the North Division of the Pacific Conference in 2011 with an 8–1–1 record. The team joined the W-League on January 16, 2013. Former Australian U17 Women's National Team Coach Vicki Linton was hired as head coach on April 4. They secured Kezar Stadium for their home games on May 3. The Breeze defeated Santa Clarita Blue Heat 1–0 in their W-League debut on May 25.

== Year-by-year ==
Year	Division	League	Reg. season	Playoffs
2011	2	WPSL	1st, Pacific North	Conference Semi-final
2012	2	WPSL	5th, Pacific North	Did not qualify
2013	2	W-League	5th, Western	Did not qualify
2014	2	W-League	5th, Western	Did not qualify

== Links ==
- Team Facebook Page
