= Viviana Schiavi =

Italian footballer and coach

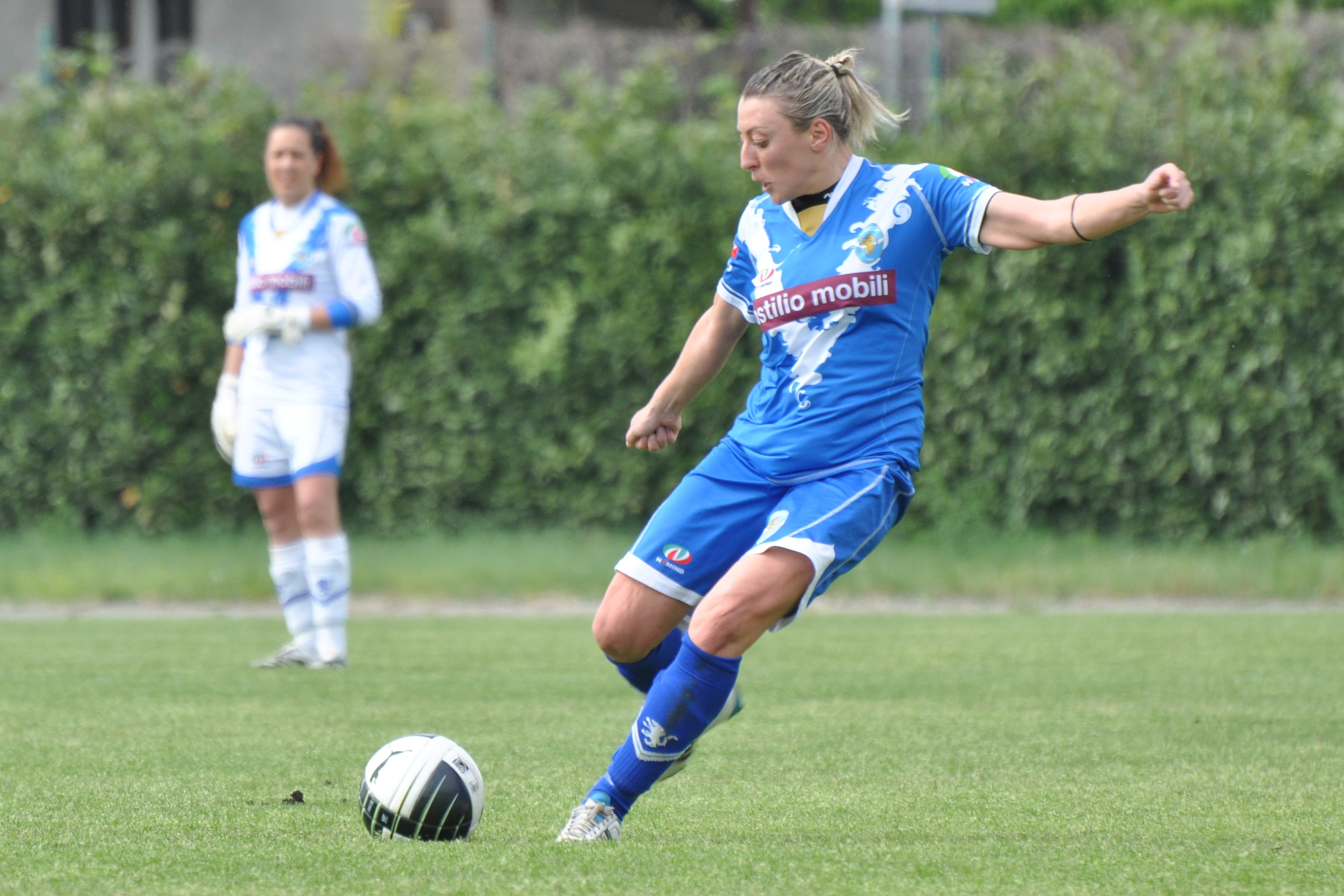

Personal information
- Full name: Viviana Schiavi
- Date of birth: 1 September 1982 (age 44)
- Place of birth: Milan, Italy
- Height: 1.67 m (5 ft 6 in)
- Position: Defender

Senior career*
Years	Team	Apps	(Gls)
1999–2008	Fiammamonza		
2008–2010	Bardolino	38	(5)
2010–2013	Brescia	46	(2)
2013	AC Seattle PH		
2013–2016	ASD Mozzanica	71	(1)
2014	→ Pali Blues (loan)		

International career
2001–2012	Italy	43	(1)
- * Club domestic league appearances and goals

Viviana Schiavi (born 1 September 1982) is an Italian football coach and former defender, who most recently played for ASD Mozzanica of Serie A. She previously played for ACF Brescia, ASD Fiammamonza and CF Bardolino.

She was a member of the Italian national team since 2001, and played the 2005 and 2009 European Championships.

== Titles ==
- 2 Italian Leagues (2006, 2009)
- 2 Italian Cup (2009, 2012)
- 2 Italian Supercups (2006, 2008)
