= Stefán Örn Sigurðsson =

Icelandic footballer (born 1954)

Personal information
- Date of birth: 20 February 1954 (age 72)
- Position: Defender

Youth career
- KR

Senior career*
Years	Team	Apps	(Gls)
1972–1978	KR		
1978	Holbæk B&I		
1979–1981	KR		
1983	KR		

International career
1978	Iceland	1	(0)
- * Club domestic league appearances and goals

Stefán Örn Sigurðsson (born 20 February 1954) is an Icelandic former football player and former member of the Icelandic men's national football team.

== Club career ==
After playing for KR since 1972, Stefán Örn signed with Holbæk B&I in August 1978. He returned to KR in 1979. After the 1983 season, Stefán Örn moved to the United States to attend Davis & Elkins College where he also played football.

== National team career ==
In September 1978, Stefán was selected to the Icelandic national football team for the first time ahead of its game against East Germany. He started in Iceland's 3–1 loss.

== Personal life ==
Stefán Örn is the father of Icelandic ice hockey player Robbie Sigurðsson.

== See also ==
- List of Iceland international footballers
