= Roland Hofer =

Italian ice hockey player

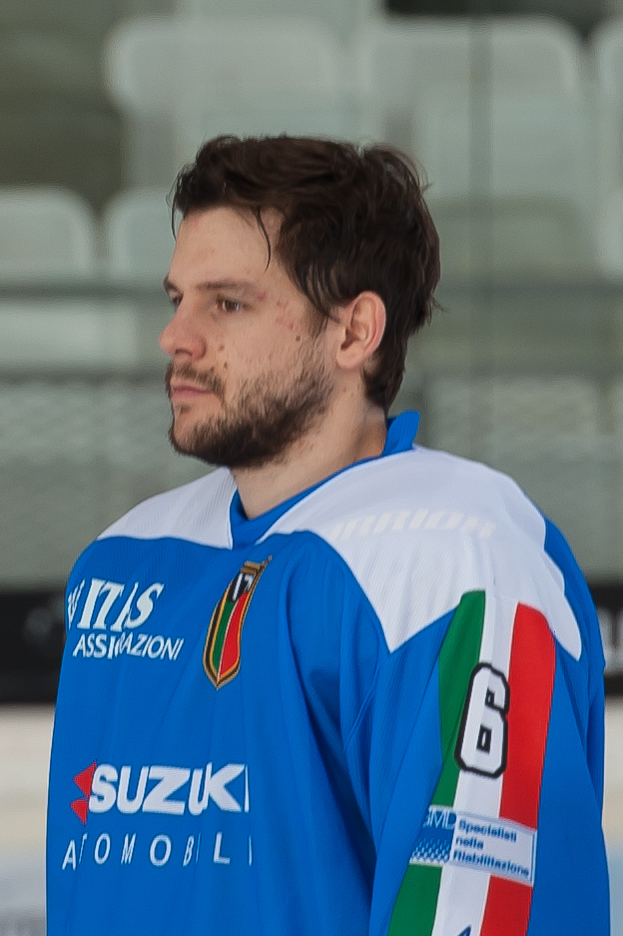
- Born: 24 June 1990 (age 35) Sterzing, Italy
- Height: 6 ft 1 in (185 cm)
- Weight: 196 lb (89 kg; 14 st 0 lb)
- Position: Defence
- Shoots: Left
- AlpsHL team Former teams: HC Pustertal Wölfe; Sterzing-Vipiteno Broncos; Sport; HeKi; Peliitat; HC Bolzano; Ritten Sport
- National team: Italy
- Playing career: 2006–present

Roland Hofer (born 24 June 1990) is an Italian professional ice hockey defenceman who is currently playing for HC Pustertal Wölfe of the Alps Hockey League (AlpsHL).

Hofer has previously played in the Finnish second division, the Mestis league with Sport, HeKi and Peliitat Heinola. Hofer competed in the 2012 IIHF World Championship as a member of the Italy men's national ice hockey team.
