= Charlie Naimo =

American soccer coach

Personal information
- Full name: Charles Naimo
- Place of birth: United States

Managerial career
- Years: Team
- 1998–1999: Central Jersey Splash
- 2000: New Brunswick Power
- 2004–2006: New Jersey Wildcats
- 2007: Jersey Sky Blues
- 2008–2010: Pali Blues
- 2011–2012: Los Angeles Blues
- 2012–2014: Pali Blues

Charlie Naimo is currently the technical director of the Western New York Flash in the National Women's Soccer League.

Naimo started his USL coaching career in 1998 with the Central Jersey Splash of the W-League. He coached the Splash for two seasons before moving to the New Brunswick Power for the 2000 W-League season. He was named the W-League Coach of the Year in 1999 with the Splash.

He returned to the W-League in 2004 to coach the New Jersey Wildcats with great success. In three seasons with the Wildcats, Naimo posted a 47–2–1 record including the 2005 W-League Championship.

After spending the 2007 season as head coach of the W-League's Jersey Sky Blues – a predecessor to Sky Blue FC of Women's Professional Soccer, Naimo moved to California, where he started the Pali Blues of the W-League. From 2008 to 2010, he served as head coach of the Pali Blues winning the W-League Championship in 2008 and 2009.

Naimo was also involved with Women's Professional Soccer, serving as the general manager of the Los Angeles Sol in 2009 and as a technical advisor with the Chicago Red Stars in 2010.

In 2011, Naimo moved into coaching on the men's side when he assumed the position of head coach for the Los Angeles Blues in the team's debut season in the USL Pro. He served in that position for two seasons before resigning following the 2012 season.

In 2012, Naimo returned to the role of head coach of the Pali Blues in addition to his role with the Blues men's team. He brought the Blues back to the W-League championship, where they fell to the Ottawa Fury in penalty kicks after a 1–1 tie. Naimo earned the 2012 W-League Coach of the Year Award.

In 2014, Naimo was hired by the Western New York Flash in the role of technical director.

In 2016, Naimo was hired by the North Carolina Courage as technical director for the NWSL Franchise.

In 2018, Naimo was hired by Capelli Sports and Cedar Stars Soccer Academy as their executive general manager.
