= Sasha Andrews =

Canadian soccer player (born 1983)

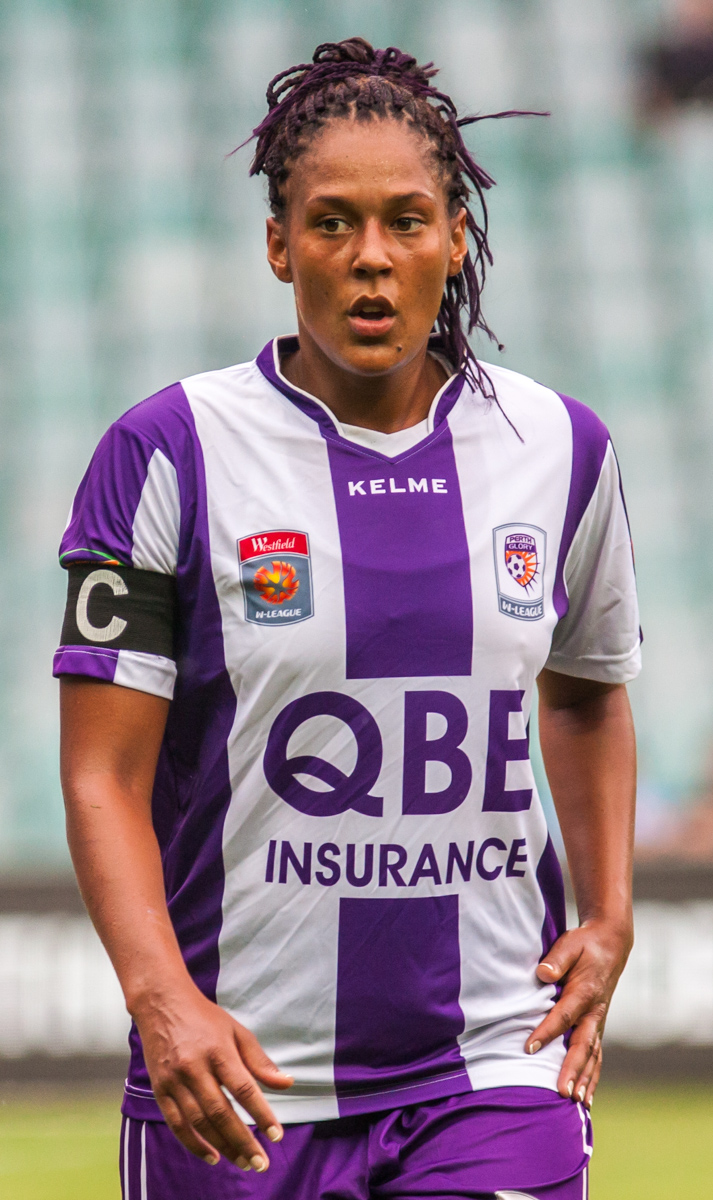
- Andrews playing for Perth Glory in 2012

Personal information
- Full name: Sasha Andrews
- Date of birth: February 14, 1983 (age 43)
- Place of birth: Edmonton, Alberta, Canada
- Height: 5 ft 11 in (1.80 m)
- Position: Defender

Team information
- Current team: UMF Afturelding
- Number: 13

College career
| Years | Team | Apps | (Gls) |
| 2002–2003 | SMU Mustangs | | |
| 2004–2005 | Nebraska Cornhuskers | 66 | (9) |

Senior career*
| Years | Team | Apps | (Gls) |
| 2004–2006 | Vancouver Whitecaps | 24 | (1) |
| 2008 | Pali Blues | 7 | (0) |
| 2010 | Linderud-Grei | 4 | (2) |
| 2011 | Pali Blues | 14 | (1) |
| 2012–2014 | Perth Glory | 20 | (0) |
| 2014 | Los Angeles Blues | 11 | (0) |
| 2015– | UMF Afturelding | 18 | (1) |

International career
| 2002 | Canada U-19 | | |
| 2002– | Canada | 45 | (3) |
Medal record
Women's Football (soccer)
Representing Canada
Pan American Games
| Bronze medal – third place | 2007 Rio de Janeiro | Team |
- * Club domestic league appearances and goals as of September 29, 2015

Sasha Andrews (born February 14, 1983, in Edmonton, Alberta) is a Canadian soccer defender who plays for Icelandic club UMF Afturelding in the Úrvalsdeild. She won a bronze medal with the Canadian women's national soccer team at the 2007 Pan American Games.

== Career ==
She has played for Vancouver Whitecaps and Pali Blues in the USL W-League, Linderud-Grei in the Toppserien and Perth Glory in the Australian W-League.
