= Mikhail Plotnikov =

Russian ice hockey player

- Born: 31 July 1992 (age 32); Novokuznetsk, Russia
- Height: 6 ft 0 in (183 cm)
- Weight: 201 lb (91 kg; 14 st 5 lb)
- Position: Forward
- Shoots: Left
- KHL team Former teams: Free Agent; HC Ugra; Metallurg Novokuznetsk; HC Spartak Moscow; Admiral Vladivostok; Yunost Minsk; Kunlun Red Star
- NHL draft: Undrafted
- Playing career: 2013–present

Mikhail Andreyevich Plotnikov (Russian: Михаил Андреевич Плотников; born 31 July, 1992) is a Russian professional ice hockey player. He is currently an unrestricted free agent who most recently played with HC Kunlun Red Star of the Kontinental Hockey League (KHL).

Plotnikov made his Kontinental Hockey League debut playing with HC Ugra during the 2013–14 KHL season.
