= Ice Hockey Iceland =

Ice hockey governing body in Iceland

Iceland
- Association name: Íshokkísamband Íslands
- IIHF Code: ISL
- IIHF membership: May 6, 1992
- President: Helgi Pall Thorisson
- IIHF men's ranking: 34th
- IIHF women's ranking: 27th

The Ice Hockey union of Iceland (Icelandic: Íshokkísamband Íslands (ÍHÍ) is the governing body of ice hockey in Iceland.

== Competitions ==
- Men's
  - Icelandic Men's Hockey League
- Women's
  - Icelandic Women's Hockey League

== National teams ==
=== Iceland men ===
- Iceland men's national ice hockey team
- Iceland men's national under 20 ice hockey team

=== Iceland Women ===
- Iceland women's national ice hockey team

== Icelandic Ice Hockey Player of the Year ==
=== Men's ===
- 2004 – Jónas Breki Magnússon
- 2008 – Jón Benedikt Gíslason
- 2011 – Björn Már Jakobsson
- 2012 – Ólafur Hrafn Björnsson
- 2013 – Ingvar Þór Jónsson
- 2014 – Björn Róbert Sigurðsson
- 2015 – Úlfar Jón Andrésson
- 2016 – Andri Már Mikaelsson
- 2017 – Robbie Sigurðsson
- 2018 – Jóhann Már Leifsson
- 2019 – Róbert Freyr Pálsson
- 2020 – Jóhann Már Leifsson (2)
- 2021 – Bjarki Reyr Jóhannesson
- 2022 – Jóhann Már Leifsson (3)

=== Women's ===
- 2004 – Anna Sonja Ágústdóttir
- 2008 – Flosrún Vaka Jóhannesdóttir
- 2011 – Sarah Smiley
- 2012 – Anna Sonja Ágústsdóttir
- 2013 – Jónína Margrét Guðbjartsdóttir
- 2014 – Linda Brá Sveinsdóttir
- 2015 – Guðrún Marín Viðarsdóttir
- 2016 – Flosrún Vaka Jóhannesdóttir
- 2017 – Eva María Karvelsdóttir
- 2018 – Silvía Rán Björgvinsdóttir
- 2019 – Kolbrún María Garðarsdóttir
- 2020 – Sunna Björgvinsdóttir
- 2021 – Kristín Ingadóttir
- 2022 – Sigrún Agatha Árnadóttir
