= Arizona Strikers FC =

- Full name: Arizona Strikers Football Club
- Founded: 2013
- Dissolved: 2015
- Ground: Desert Sun Stadium; Yuma, Arizona
- Capacity: 10,000
- Owner(s): AGM Soccer Management, LLC
- General Manager: Ricardo Hinds
- Head Coach: Manny Arias
- League: USL W-League
Home colors	Away colors

Arizona Strikers FC was a women's soccer team based in Yuma, Arizona. They played in the Western Conference of the USL W-League, the second highest tier of women's soccer in the United States and Canada.

== History ==
The team began as the Sedona FC Strikers, based in Sedona, Arizona. The team moved to Yuma, Arizona and became Arizona Strikers FC on January 3, 2015.

=== Controversy ===
The team chose to sponsor The Desert Sun Clasico for July 14, 2015. It would have featured Club Tijuana against Monarcas Morelia. However, poor ticket sales lead to the events cancellation. President Manny Arias remarked that "Yuma has a lot of selfish people". That statement ignited the community as few knew of the match due to poor promotion and it is noted the team spent more time in San Luis going unnoticed by much of Yuma. Following the comments their website was taken down and the teams Facebook page was not being updated. A second season in Yuma was now a definite no.

== Year-by-year ==
Year	League	Record	Regular season	Playoffs
2014	USL W-League	0–12–0	8th, Western Conference	Did not qualify
2015	USL W-League	1–11–0	6th, Western Conference	Did not qualify

== Players ==
=== Final roster ===
As of July 11, 2015
Note: Flags indicate national team as defined under FIFA eligibility rules; some limited exceptions apply. Players may hold more than one non-FIFA nationality.

No.	Pos.	Nation	Player
4	DF	USA	Brenda Barniga
1	GK	MEX	Esthefanny Barreras
14	DF	CAN	Jessica Barton
6	MF	USA	Andrea Bedoya
21	MF	USA	Kitzel Cota
12	FW	USA	Celeste Diaz
9	FW	MEX	Luz Duarte
7	FW	MEX	Elisa Espino
0	GK	USA	Erika Garcia
15	FW	USA	Patricia Gomez
18	MF	USA	Maria Ibarra
13	MF	MEX	Olivia Jiménez
17	DF	USA	Sarena Lapham

No.	Pos.	Nation	Player
14	MF	USA	Brielle Leon
17	DF	USA	Jennifer Larsen
8	MF	USA	Monica Lubin
3	FW	MEX	Edith Navarro
11	DF	USA	Mariela Ortega
0	GK	USA	Yazmin Osorio
5	DF	USA	Abigail Rosales
15	MF	USA	Marina Schachowskoj
4	FW	USA	Leilani Skinner
18	FW	USA	Sheridan Smith
10	MF	USA	Franchesca Vasquez
2	DF	USA	Taylor Wheeler

== Stadia ==
- Sedona Red Rock High School, Sedona, Arizona (2014)
- Desert Sun Stadium, Yuma, Arizona (2015)
