= Radek Haas =

Czech ice hockey goaltender

- Born: February 5, 2000 (age 25) Karlovy Vary, Czech Republic
- Height: 6 ft 3 in (191 cm)
- Weight: 176 lb (80 kg; 12 st 8 lb)
- Position: Goaltender
- Catches: Right
- ELH team (P) Cur. team Former teams: BK Mladá Boleslav; HC Slovan Ústí nad Labem (Chance Liga); Ässät
- Playing career: 2019–present

Radek Haas (born February 5, 2000) is a Czech professional ice hockey goaltender. He is currently playing for HC Slovan Ústí nad Labem of the Chance Liga on loan from BK Mladá Boleslav.

Haas was an academy player at Mladá Boleslav from 2013 to 2017 before moving to Finland to join Ässät's academy. He went on to play three games for Ässät's senior team during the 2018–19 Liiga season. On October 19, 2019, Haas returned to Mladá Boleslav and played two games for the team during the 2019–20 season. He also had loan spells with HC Stadion Litoměřice, HC Baník Sokolov and LHK Jestřábi Prostějov during the season.

On July 20, 2020, Haas went sent out on loan to HC Slovan Ústí nad Labem.
