= Icelandic Women's Hockey League =

Toppdeild kvenna
- Sport: Ice hockey
- Country: Iceland
- Most recent champion: Fjölnir (1st title)
- Most titles: SA Ásynjur (21 titles)
- Website: www.ihi.is

Íslandsmót kvenna í íshokkí (English: Icelandic Women's Hockey League), also previously known as Hertz deild kvenna for sponsorship reasons, is an ice hockey league in Iceland. Its current champion is SA Ásynjur. It is run by Ice Hockey Iceland.

== League Champions ==
- 2000–2001 – SA Ásynjur
- 2001–2002 – SA Ásynjur
- 2002–2003 – SA Ásynjur
- 2003–2004 – SA Ásynjur
- 2004–2005 – SA Ásynjur
- 2005–2006 – Björninn
- 2006–2007 – SA Ásynjur
- 2007–2008 – SA Ásynjur
- 2008–2009 – SA Ásynjur
- 2009–2010 – SA Ásynjur
- 2010–2011 – SA Ásynjur
- 2011–2012 – SA Ásynjur
- 2012–2013 – SA Ásynjur
- 2013–2014 – SA Ásynjur
- 2014–2015 – SA Ásynjur
- 2015–2016 – SA Ásynjur
- 2016–2017 – SA Ynjur
- 2017–2018 – SA Ásynjur
- 2018–2019 – SA Ásynjur
- 2019–2020 – SA Ásynjur
- 2020–2021 – SA Ásynjur
- 2021–2022 – SA Ásynjur
- 2022–2023 – SA Ásynjur
- 2023–2024 – Fjölnir

== Titles by team ==
Titles	Club	Years
21	SA Ásynjur	2001, 2002, 2003, 2004, 2005, 2007, 2008, 2009, 2010, 2011, 2012, 2013, 2014, 2015, 2016, 2018, 2019, 2020, 2021, 2022, 2023
1	Björninn	2006
1	Fjölnir	2024
1	SA Ynjur	2017

== See also ==
- Icelandic Men's Hockey League
