= Lydia Hastings =

American association football player

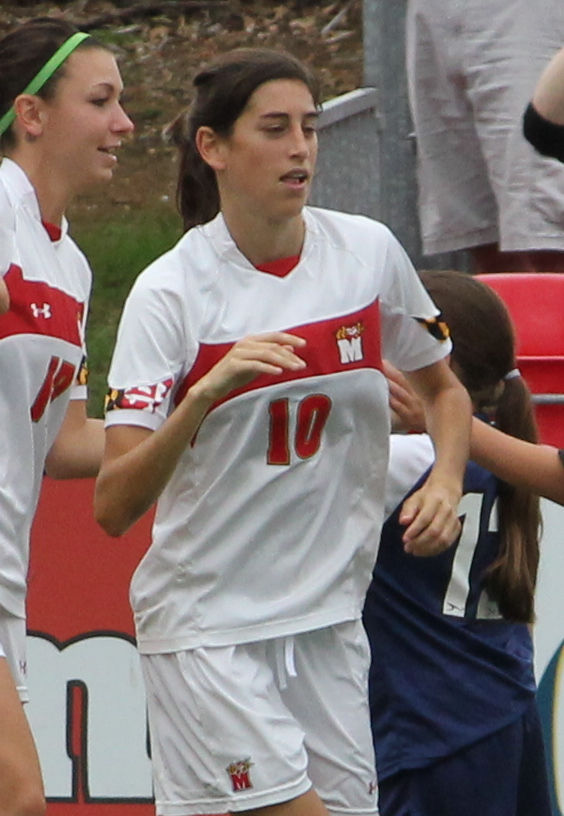

Personal information
- Birth name: Lydia Birch Hastings
- Date of birth: February 5, 1990 (age 36)
- Place of birth: Dewey Beach, Delaware, United States
- Height: 1.68 m (5 ft 6 in)
- Position: Midfielder

College career
Years	Team	Apps	(Gls)
2008–2011	Maryland Terrapins	83	(10)

Senior career*
Years	Team	Apps	(Gls)
2013	PK-35 Vantaa	11	(5)
2014	Herforder SV	11	(1)
2015	CD Transportes Alcaine		
- * Club domestic league appearances and goals

Lydia Birch Hastings (born February 5, 1990) is an American soccer player who played for Bundesliga team Herforder SV Borussia Friedenstal.
