= Dmitri Gurkov =

Kazakh ice hockey center (born 1996)

- Born: 3 June 1996 (age 30) Moscow, Russia
- Height: 1.86 m (6 ft 1 in)
- Weight: 75 kg (165 lb; 11 st 11 lb)
- Position: Centre
- Shoots: Left
- KHL team Former teams: Free agent Barys Astana
- National team: Kazakhstan
- Playing career: 2016–present

Dmitri Gurkov (Kazakh: Дмитрий Гурков; born 3 June 1996) is a Kazakhstani professional ice hockey player who is currently an unrestricted free agent. He most recently played for Barys Astana in the Kontinental Hockey League (KHL) and the Kazakhstani national team.

He represented Kazakhstan at the 2021 IIHF World Championship.
