= Mele French =

American soccer player

Personal information
- Full name: Melelina Soline French
- Date of birth: June 15, 1984 (age 42)
- Place of birth: Mililani, Hawaii, United States
- Height: 5 ft 5 in (1.65 m)
- Position: Forward

Youth career
- 1998–2003: Honolulu Bulls

College career
Years	Team	Apps	(Gls)
2002–2004	Oregon Ducks	47	(8)

Senior career*
Years	Team	Apps	(Gls)
2008	Pali Blues	11	(2)
2008	Ajax America		
2009	Sky Blue FC	1	(0)
2010	SC Freiburg	10	(2)
2010–2011	Western New York Flash	12	(7)
2012	Vancouver Whitecaps Women		
2013	Pali Blues		
2014	LA Blues		(8)
- * Club domestic league appearances and goals as of 06:21, October 21, 2009 (UTC) ‡ National team caps and goals as of 06:21, October 21, 2009 (UTC)

Melelina Soline "Mele" French (born June 15, 1984) is an American soccer forward who played for the NWSL's Seattle Reign FC and W-League's Seattle Sounders Women in 2015. French was named the W-League's Most Valuable Player for the 2014 season while playing for the LA Blues, also known as the Pali Blues. She is currently the Director of Coaching at the Los Angeles Bulls Soccer Club, a youth soccer organization she co-founded with fellow soccer player Kelly Parker (formerly of the Canadian national team).

== Career ==
Prior to joining Santa Clarita Blue Heat in 2016, French played for both Seattle Reign FC and Seattle Sounders Women in 2015, Pali Blues in 2013, helping the Blues win the W-League Western Conference on July 21 and the Championship on July 28, LA Blues in 2014 where she helped the team win the W-League Western Conference and the Championship on July 27 and was selected as the W-League MVP for the season, Vancouver Whitecaps Women after being signed for the Whitecaps’ 2012 season on March 29, 2012, Western New York Flash during their 2010 Championship season and 2011 season, German club SC Freiburg, Sky Blue FC of Women's Professional Soccer after being drafted 60th overall in the WPS 2009 draft, Ajax America, and Pali Blues in 2008, scoring two goals and two assists to help the team win their first W-League Championship on August 2, 2008, in Virginia Beach, Virginia, U.S.

=== College ===
In college French played for the Oregon Ducks for four years, scoring eight goals and three assists.

== Coaching ==
French founded the Force Football Academy that develops youth soccer players in the Los Angeles region. She also created and is the Director of Coaching at Chelsea Soccer Club LA, which is currently known as the Los Angeles Bulls Soccer Club, after it officially became its own organization in 2018.

== Personal life ==
French graduated from the University of Oregon in 2006 with a bachelor's degree in general business.
