= Leah Fortune =

Brazilian football player and manager

Personal information
- Full name: Leah Lynn Gabriela Fortune
- Date of birth: 13 December 1990 (age 35)
- Place of birth: São Paulo, Brazil
- Height: 1.70 m (5 ft 7 in)
- Position: Midfielder

Youth career
- 1994–2005: Brasilia LFC

College career
Years	Team	Apps	(Gls)
2009–2010	Texas Longhorns		
2011–2013	Lee Flames		

Senior career*
Years	Team	Apps	(Gls)
2005–2009	Brasilia LFC	248	(9)
2009	Team Chicago LFC	35	(6)
2012–2015	Charlotte Lady Eagles		
2016	Orlando Pride	3	(0)

International career
2006–2009	Brazil U18	37	(5)
2009–2010	Brazil U20	19	(8)
2010–2014	Brazil	6	(0)

Managerial career
- 2014–2016: USC Upstate (assistant)
- 2017–: Lipscomb (assistant)
- * Club domestic league appearances and goals

Leah Lynn Gabriela Fortune (born 13 December 1990) is a Brazilian football manager and former player. She has been a member of the Brazil women's national team. She has also played for the National Women's Soccer League (NWSL) club Orlando Pride.

== Biography ==
She was born in São Paulo to American missionary parents and grew up in Illinois, and has USA and Brazilian citizenship. She attended Wheaton Academy, graduating high school in 2009.

FIFA.com described her as "one of the more unusual players" in the 2010 U-20 Women's World Cup, and described her style of taking throw-ins as "a remarkable long throw, the prelude of which is a spectacular forward flip to help her launch the ball a long way into the area". In November 2010, Leah was called up to the Brazil women's national football team. However, she tore her anterior cruciate ligament, leaving her out of football for months in recovery.
