= Icelandic Men's Hockey League =

Hockey League in Iceland

Toppdeild karla
- Current season, competition or edition: 2026–27 Icelandic Hockey League season
- Icelandic Men's Hockey League
- Sport: Ice hockey
- Founded: 1991; 35 years ago
- No. of teams: 4
- Country: Iceland
- Most recent champion: Skautafélag Akureyrar (6th title)
- Most titles: Skautafélag Akureyrar (24 titles)
- Website: www.ihi.is

The Icelandic Men's Hockey League (Icelandic: Toppdeild karla) is an ice hockey league in Iceland. It currently has four active teams. It is run by Ice Hockey Iceland.

== History ==
Hockey was first played in Iceland in around 1950, on ponds and rivers. The weather made it very hard to play, so Icelandic hockey did not develop for some time. In 1987, the first outdoor ice arena was built with an artificial surface, and a second was built three years later. The first indoor arena was built in 1997, and a second was built in 2000.

The league was formed in 1991, originally with three teams. The league season usually starts at the beginning of October and ends in March/April.

== Current teams ==
Team	City	Arena
Skautafélag Akureyrar Víkingar	Akureyri	Skautahöllin á Akureyri
Skautafélag Hafnarfjarðar	Reykjavík	Skautasvellið í Egilshöll
Skautafélag Reykjavíkur	Reykjavík	Skautahöllin í Laugardal
Ungmennafélagið Fjölnir	Reykjavík	Skautasvellið í Egilshöll

== Former teams ==
- Skautafélagið Björninn (27 seasons: 1991–2018)
- Esja Reykjavík in Reykjavík (4 seasons: 2014–2018)
- Gulldrengir (1 season: 2000–2001)
- Húnar, Björninn reserve team (3 seasons: 2011–2014)
- Narfi frá Hrísey (Narfi Íshokkí) in Hrísey (3 seasons: 2004–2006, 2007–2008, 2023–24)
- SR Fálkar, Skautafélag Reykjavíkur reserve team (2 season: 2012–2014)
- SA Jötnar, Skautafélag Akureyrar reserve team (5 seasons: 1994–1995, 2010–2014)

== League champions ==
- 1991–1992 – Skautafélag Akureyrar
- 1992–1993 – Skautafélag Akureyrar
- 1993–1994 – Skautafélag Akureyrar
- 1994–1995 – Skautafélag Akureyrar
- 1995–1996 – Skautafélag Akureyrar
- 1996–1997 – Skautafélag Akureyrar
- 1997–1998 – Skautafélag Akureyrar
- 1998–1999 – Skautafélag Reykjavíkur
- 1999–2000 – Skautafélag Reykjavíkur
- 2000–2001 – Skautafélag Akureyrar
- 2001–2002 – Skautafélag Akureyrar
- 2002–2003 – Skautafélag Akureyrar
- 2003–2004 – Skautafélag Akureyrar
- 2004–2005 – Skautafélag Akureyrar
- 2005–2006 – Skautafélag Reykjavíkur
- 2006–2007 – Skautafélag Reykjavíkur
- 2007–2008 – Skautafélag Akureyrar
- 2008–2009 – Skautafélag Reykjavíkur
- 2009–2010 – Skautafélag Akureyrar
- 2010–2011 – Skautafélag Akureyrar
- 2011–2012 – Björninn
- 2012–2013 – Skautafélag Akureyrar
- 2013–2014 – Skautafélag Akureyrar
- 2014–2015 – Skautafélag Akureyrar
- 2015–2016 – Skautafélag Akureyrar
- 2016–2017 – Esja Reykjavík
- 2017–2018 – Skautafélag Akureyrar
- 2018–2019 – Skautafélag Akureyrar
- 2019–2020 - Season canceled due to the COVID-19 outbreak.
- 2020–2021 – Skautafélag Akureyrar
- 2021–2022 – Skautafélag Akureyrar
- 2022–2023 – Skautafélag Reykjavíkur
- 2023–2024 – Skautafélag Reykjavíkur
- 2024–2025 – Skautafélag Akureyrar
- 2025–2026 – Skautafélag Reykjavíkur

== Titles by team ==
Titles	Club	Years
24	Skautafélag Akureyrar	1992, 1993, 1994, 1995, 1996, 1997, 1998, 2001, 2002, 2003, 2004, 2005, 2008, 2010, 2011, 2013, 2014, 2015, 2016, 2018, 2019, 2021, 2022, 2025
7	Skautafélag Reykjavíkur	1999, 2000, 2006, 2007, 2009, 2023, 2024, 2026
1	Björninn	2012
1	Esja Reykjavík	2017

== See also ==
- Icelandic Women's Hockey League
