= Narfi frá Hrísey =

Narfi fra Hrisey
- City: Hrísey, Iceland
- Founded: 1964
- Folded: 2008
- Colours: White, Orange

Narfi fra Hrisey was an ice hockey team in Hrísey, Iceland, founded in 1964. The team played in the Icelandic Men's Hockey League in the 2005, 2006, and 2008 seasons. They did not win a game in the 2007–08 season, and finished in fourth place in all three of their seasons.

== Season-by-season record ==
Season	GP	W	L	T	OTL	GF	GA	P	Results
2007–08	18	0	18	0	0	26	250	0	4th
2005–06	18	1	15	0	1	38	129	4	4th (Lost 3rd place game)
2004–05	18	4	12	2	-	78	137	10	4th
