= Skautafélagið Björninn =

Icelandic sports club

- Full name: Skautafélagið Björninn
- Short name: Björninn
- Sports: Football; Curling (defunct); Figure skating (defunct); Ice hockey (defunct)
- Founded: 22 November 1990
- Based in: Reykjavík, Iceland
- Arena: Egilshöll
- Colours: Black, White, Yellow
- Website: http://bjorninn.com

Skautafélagið Björninn (Icelandic pronunciation: [ˈskøyːtaˌfjɛːˌlaijɪð ˈpjœ(r)tnɪn], lit. 'The Bear Skating Club' (Note: Skautafélagið is the definite form of Skautafélag, meaning "the skating club".)), also known as Björninn (lit. 'The Bear') for short, is an Icelandic sports club, founded in 1990 and based in Reykjavík, Iceland. It began as a skating club that fielded ice hockey teams and included figure skating and curling programs; it eventually added football.

On 28 September 2018, the club's ice skating departments merged into Ungmennafélagið Fjölnir, which overtook all of the department's assets and debts.

== Ice hockey ==
=== Men's ice hockey ===
==== History ====
The clubs men's ice hockey team played in the Icelandic Men's Hockey League from the 1991–92 season until 2018. It won the national championship in 2012 after beating Skautafélag Reykjavíkur 3–1 in the best-of-five finals series.

In the early 1990s, Björninn was the first team to invite American service members from nearby NAS Keflavik to play on their team. At the time, each team in the Icelandic League was allowed to put a maximum of 3 non-Icelandic players on their rosters. In 1994, Petty Officer Steve Mitchell, who also played for Björninn, started the first American military team in Iceland, the NATO North Stars. The team shared practice time with Björninn and played several teams in the Icelandic League in exhibitions.

==== Achievements ====
- Icelandic champion (1): 2012

==== Season-by-season record ====
Note: GP = Games played, W = Wins, OTW = Overtime Wins, OTL = Overtime Losses, L = Losses, GF = Goals for, GA = Goals against, Pts = Points

Season	GP	W	OTW	OTL	L	GF	GA	Pts	Finish	Playoffs
2009–10	16	7	0	1	8	63	70	22	2nd	Lost final
2008–09	20	3	0	1	16	10	75	105	3rd	Did not qualify
2007–08	18	9	0	0	9	27	133	94	3rd	Did not qualify
2006–07	16	7	1	0	8	23	74	73	3rd	Did not qualify
2005–06	18	7	0	0	11	86	111	21	3rd	Won third place game

This table includes results from the last five years only.

=== Women's ice hockey ===
==== History ====
The clubs women's ice hockey team won the national championship in 2006.

==== Achievements ====
- Icelandic champion (1): 2006

== Figure Skating ==
=== Single Skating ===
==== History ====
The main activity of the figure skating department was singles skating, starting from the Learn to Skate Program up to competitive levels.

=== Synchronized skating ===
==== History ====
Björninn had two active teams of synchronized skating, Frostrósir and Ísbirnir.

== Football ==
=== Men's football ===
Björninn first fielded a men's football team during the 2010 season in the Icelandic Cup and the 3. deild karla where it served as a feeder club for Ungmennafélagið Fjölnir. In 2019, Björninn finished first in group A of the 4. deild karla. It was knocked out of the playoffs the same year by Hvíti Riddarinn on a 1–4 aggregate score.
