= Skautafélag Reykjavíkur =

Sports club in Reykjavík, Iceland

- Sports: Football; Figure skating; Ice hockey
- Founded: 1873
- Based in: Reykjavík, Iceland
- Arena: Skautahöllin Laugardal
- Colours: blue, white, red
- Website: skautafelag.is

Skautafélag Reykjavíkur is an Icelandic sports club, founded in 1873 and based in Reykjavík, Iceland. It is best known for its ice hockey teams that have played in the Icelandic Men's Hockey League and the Icelandic Women's Hockey League.

== Football ==
The football team tends to compete in the lower divisions of the Icelandic football league system. As of 2026 they compete in 5. deild karla, the sixth, and lowest, division in the pyramid. Former Premier League and Iceland national football team striker Heiðar Helguson ended his career with Skautafélag

== Ice hockey ==
=== Men's ice hockey ===
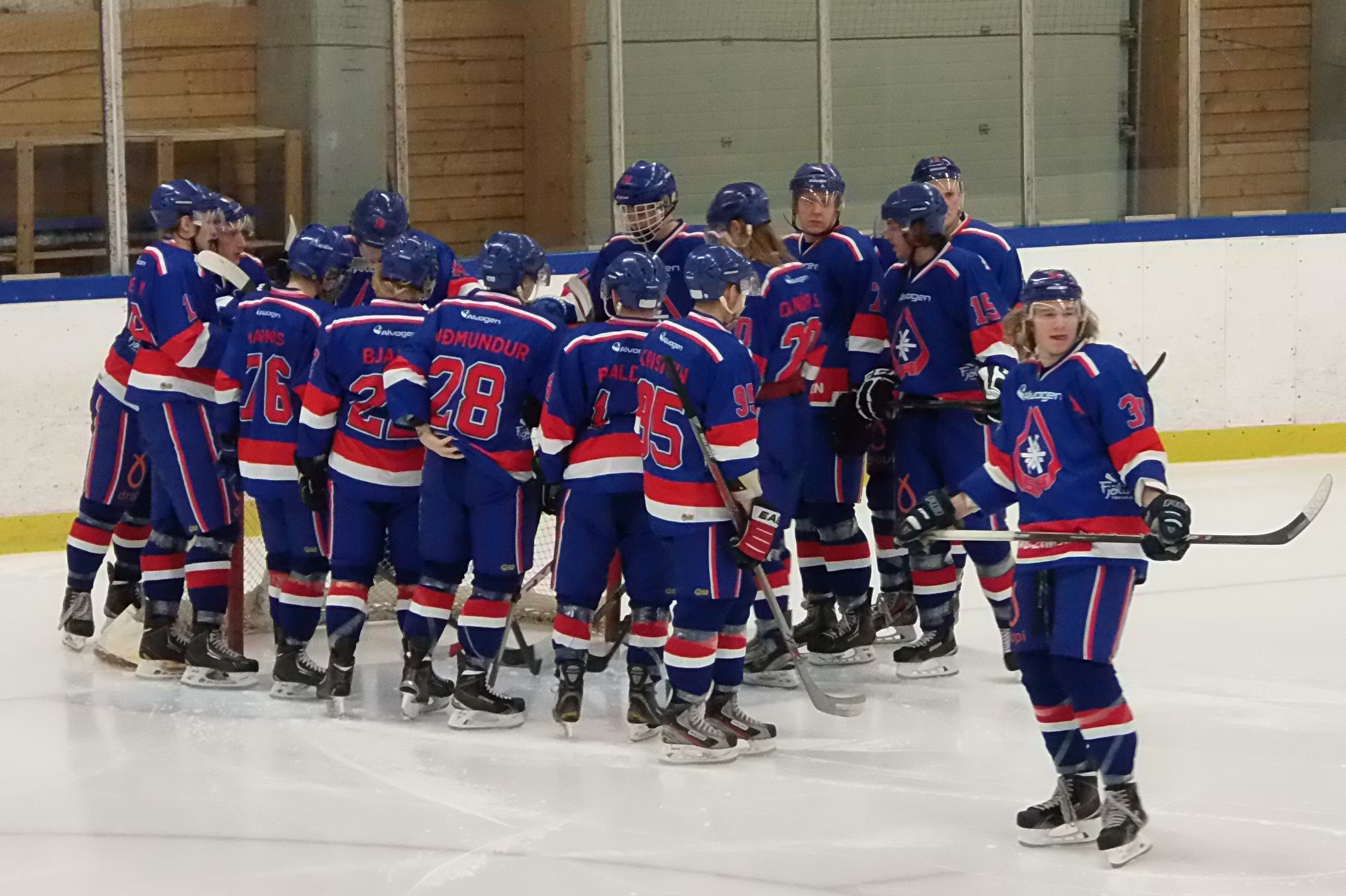
Skautafélag Reykjavíkur players in 2015

The club has won the Icelandic Men's Hockey League seven times, which is second only to Skautafélag Akureyrar.

==== Achievements ====
- Icelandic champions: (5) 1999, 2000, 2006, 2007, 2009, 2023, 2024.

==== Notable players ====
- (Iceland) Robbie Sigurðsson
