= Skautafélag Akureyrar =

- City: Akureyri, Iceland
- League: (M) Icelandic Men's Hockey League (W) Icelandic Women's Hockey League
- Founded: 1937
- Home arena: Skautahollin Akureyri
- Colours: red, white, black
- Website: www.sasport.is

Skautafélag Akureyar, also known as SA for short, is an Icelandic sports club founded in 1937 and based in Akureyri, Iceland. It is best known for its ice hockey teams that compete in the Icelandic Men's Hockey League and the Icelandic Women's Hockey League.

== Men's ice hockey ==
SA's men's team, known as SA Víkingar, has won 23 league titles, the most in its league's history.

=== Achievements ===
- Icelandic champion (23): 1992, 1993, 1994, 1995, 1996, 1997, 1998, 2001, 2002, 2003, 2004, 2005, 2008, 2010, 2011, 2013, 2014, 2015, 2016, 2018, 2019, 2021, 2022.

== Women's ice hockey ==
SA has fielded two teams in the Úrvalsdeild kvenna, SA Ásynjur and SA Ynjur, the latter consisting of its U-20 players.

=== SA Ásynjur ===
SA Ásynjur is the most successful team in the history of the Úrvalsdeild kvenna, winning 20 titles since 2001.

==== Achievements ====
- Icelandic champion (20): 2001, 2002, 2003, 2004, 2005, 2007, 2008, 2009, 2010, 2011, 2012, 2013, 2014, 2015, 2016, 2018, 2019, 2020, 2021, 2022.

=== SA Ynjur ===
SA Ynjur won its lone championship in 2017.

==== Achievements ====
- Icelandic champion (1): 2017
