= 1962–63 Bulgarian Hockey League season =

Bulgarian ice hockey season

The 1962–63 Bulgarian Hockey League season was the 11th season of the Bulgarian Hockey League, the top level of ice hockey in Bulgaria. 11 teams participated in the league, and Cerveno Zname Sofia won the championship.

== Standings ==
	Club
1.	Cerveno Zname Sofia
2.	CDNA Sofia
3.	Akademik Sofia
4.	HK Slavia Sofia
5.	Metallurg Pernik
6.	HK Levski Sofia
7.	HPZ Georgi Dimitrov Sofia
8.	Armejets Sofia
9.	Spartak Sofia
10.	Dunav Ruse
11.	Septemvri Sofia
