= 1960–61 Bulgarian Hockey League season =

Bulgarian ice hockey season

The 1960–61 Bulgarian Hockey League season was the ninth season of the Bulgarian Hockey League, the top level of ice hockey in Bulgaria. 10 teams participated in the league, and Cerveno Zname Sofia won the championship.

== Standings ==
	Club
1.	Cerveno Zname Sofia
2.	CDNA Sofia
3.	Dunav Ruse
4.	HK Levski Sofia
5.	Metallurg Pernik
6.	Spartak Sofia
7.	HK Slavia Sofia
8.	Akademik Sofia
9.	HPZ Georgi Dimitrov Sofia
10.	Septemvri Sofia
