= 1953–54 Bulgarian Hockey League season =

Bulgarian ice hockey season

The 1953–54 Bulgarian Hockey League season was the third season of the Bulgarian Hockey League, the top level of ice hockey in Bulgaria. Seven teams participated in the league, and HK Udarnik Sofia won the championship.

== Standings ==
	Club
1.	HK Udarnik Sofia
2.	Cerveno Zname Sofia
3.	CDNA Sofia
4.	Stroitel Sofia
5.	Akademik Sofia
6.	Torpedo Sofia
7.	HK Dinamo Sofia
