= 1979–80 Bulgarian Hockey League season =

Bulgarian ice hockey season

The 1979–80 Bulgarian Hockey League season was the 28th season of the Bulgarian Hockey League, the top level of ice hockey in Bulgaria. Five teams participated in the league, and Levski-Spartak Sofia won the championship.

== Standings ==
	Club	GP	W	T	L	Goals	Pts
1.	Levski-Spartak Sofia	20	17	0	3	122:53	34
2.	HK Slavia Sofia	20	14	2	4	122:61	30
3.	Akademik Sofia	20	6	3	11	62:92	15
4.	Metallurg Pernik	20	6	1	13	73:125	13
5.	HK CSKA Sofia	20	4	0	16	72:120	8
