= 1990–91 Bulgarian Hockey League season =

Bulgarian ice hockey season

The 1990–91 Bulgarian Hockey League season was the 39th season of the Bulgarian Hockey League, the top level of ice hockey in Bulgaria. Five teams participated in the league, and HK Slavia Sofia won the championship.

== Regular season ==
	Club	GP	W	T	L	Goals	Pts
1.	HK Slavia Sofia	24	22	1	1	221:66	45
2.	HK Levski Sofia	24	16	2	6	164:60	34
3.	HK CSKA Sofia	24	10	0	14	114:169	20
4.	Metallurg Pernik	24	8	2	14	100:153	18
5.	Akademik Sofia	24	1	1	22	53:204	3

== Final ==
- HK Slavia Sofia - HK Levski Sofia 5:3/6:4
