= 1959–60 Bulgarian Hockey League season =

Bulgarian ice hockey season

The 1959–60 Bulgarian Hockey League season was the eighth season of the Bulgarian Hockey League, the top level of ice hockey in Bulgaria. 10 teams participated in the league, and Cerveno Zname Sofia won the championship.

== Standings ==
	Club
1.	Cerveno Zname Sofia
2.	CDNA Sofia
3.	Lenin Pernik
4.	Dunav Ruse
5.	HK Levski Sofia
6.	Septemvri Sofia
7.	Spartak Sofia
8.	HK Slavia Sofia
9.	Akademik Sofia
10.	HPZ Georgi Dimitrov Sofia
