= 1974–75 Bulgarian Hockey League season =

Bulgarian ice hockey season

The 1974–75 Bulgarian Hockey League season was the 23rd season of the Bulgarian Hockey League, the top level of ice hockey in Bulgaria. Nine teams participated in the league, and HK CSKA Sofia won the championship.

== Standings ==
	Club
1.	HK CSKA Sofia
2.	Levski-Spartak Sofia
3.	Khimik Stara Zagora
4.	HK Slavia Sofia
5.	Metallurg Pernik
6.	Akademik Sofia
7.	Minor Pernik
8.	Lokomotive Sofia
9.	DZS Elin Pelin
