= 1998–99 Bulgarian Hockey League season =

Bulgarian ice hockey season

The 1998–99 Bulgarian Hockey League season was the 47th season of the Bulgarian Hockey League, the top level of ice hockey in Bulgaria. Four teams participated in the league, and HK Levski Sofia won the championship.

== Standings ==
	Club	GP	W	T	L	Goals	Pts
1.	HK Levski Sofia	12	9	1	2	76:26	19
2.	HK Slavia Sofia	12	8	1	3	85:48	17
3.	Akademik Sofia/HK Metallurg Pernik	12	6	0	6	61:49	12
4.	Etro 92 Tarnovo	12	0	0	12	35:150	0
