= 1984–85 Bulgarian Hockey League season =

Bulgarian ice hockey season

The 1984–85 Bulgarian Hockey League season was the 33rd season of the Bulgarian Hockey League, the top level of ice hockey in Bulgaria. Five teams participated in the league, and HK Slavia Sofia won the championship.

== Regular season ==
	Club	GP	W	T	L	Goals	Pts
1.	HK Slavia Sofia	20	16	2	2	115:38	34
2.	Levski-Spartak Sofia	20	14	3	3	108:52	31
3.	HK CSKA Sofia	20	10	1	9	98:70	21
4.	Akademik Sofia	20	6	2	12	80:111	14
5.	Metallurg Pernik	20	0	0	20	42:182	0

Source: Elite Prospects

== Final ==
- HK Slavia Sofia - Levski-Spartak Sofia 6:5
