= 1985–86 Bulgarian Hockey League season =

Bulgarian ice hockey season

The 1985–86 Bulgarian Hockey League season was the 34th season of the Bulgarian Hockey League, the top level of ice hockey in Bulgaria. Five teams participated in the league, and HK CSKA Sofia won the championship.

== Regular season ==
	Club	GP	W	T	L	Goals	Pts
1.	HK CSKA Sofia	20	15	3	2	99:60	33
2.	Levski-Spartak Sofia	20	14	2	4	97:57	30
3.	HK Slavia Sofia	20	12	3	5	106:56	27
4.	Akademik Sofia	20	2	1	17	57:91	5
5.	Metallurg Pernik	20	1	3	16	39:134	5

== Final ==
- HK CSKA Sofia - Levski-Spartak Sofia 2:3/5:2
