= 2000–01 Bulgarian Hockey League season =

Bulgarian ice hockey season

The 2000–01 Bulgarian Hockey League season was the 49th season of the Bulgarian Hockey League, the top level of ice hockey in Bulgaria. Six teams participated in the league, and HK Slavia Sofia won the championship.

== Regular season ==
	Club	GP	W	T	L	Goals	Pts
1.	HK Slavia Sofia	20	20	0	0	104:29	40
2.	HK Levski Sofia	20	16	0	4	88:31	32
3.	Akademik Sofia	20	12	0	8	74:52	24
4.	HK Metallurg Pernik	20	6	0	14	50:67	12
5.	Etro 92 Veliko Tarnovo	20	5	0	15	33:107	10
6.	HK CSKA Sofia	20	1	0	19	29:92	2

== Final ==
- HK Levski Sofia - HK Slavia Sofia 4:2/3:5 (1:2 SO)
