= 1986–87 Bulgarian Hockey League season =

Bulgarian ice hockey season

The 1986–87 Bulgarian Hockey League season was the 35th season of the Bulgarian Hockey League, the top level of ice hockey in Bulgaria. Five teams participated in the league, and HK Slavia Sofia won the championship.

== Regular season ==
	Club	GP	W	T	L	Goals	Pts
1.	HK Slavia Sofia	20	16	1	3	113:26	33
2.	HK CSKA Sofia	20	13	3	4	107:46	29
3.	Levski-Spartak Sofia	20	13	2	5	95:49	28
4.	Akademik Sofia	20	4	2	14	60:117	10
5.	Metallurg Pernik	20	0	0	20	31:158	0

== Final ==
- HK Slavia Sofia - HK CSKA Sofia 4:5/7:3
