= 1989–90 Bulgarian Hockey League season =

Bulgarian ice hockey season

The 1989–90 Bulgarian Hockey League season was the 38th season of the Bulgarian Hockey League, the top level of ice hockey in Bulgaria. Five teams participated in the league, and Levski-Spartak Sofia won the championship.

== Regular season ==
	Club	GP	W	T	L	Goals	Pts
1.	Levski-Spartak Sofia	24	19	3	2	182:50	41
2.	HK Slavia Sofia	24	19	2	3	225:54	40
3.	HK CSKA Sofia	24	11	5	8	175:113	27
4.	Metallurg Pernik	24	3	1	20	67:234	7
5.	Akademik Sofia	24	2	1	21	62:260	5

== Final ==
- HK Slavia Sofia - Levski-Spartak Sofia 0:6/1:10
