= 1976–77 Bulgarian Hockey League season =

Bulgarian ice hockey season

The 1976–77 Bulgarian Hockey League season was the 25th season of the Bulgarian Hockey League, the top level of ice hockey in Bulgaria. Five teams participated in the league, and Levski-Spartak Sofia won the championship.

== Standings ==
	Club
1.	Levski-Spartak Sofia
2.	HK Slavia Sofia
3.	HK CSKA Sofia
4.	Akademik Sofia
5.	Metallurg Pernik
