= 1988–89 Bulgarian Hockey League season =

Bulgarian ice hockey season

The 1988–89 Bulgarian Hockey League season was the 37th season of the Bulgarian Hockey League, the top level of ice hockey in Bulgaria. Five teams participated in the league, and Levski-Spartak Sofia won the championship.

== Regular season ==
	Club	GP	W	T	L	Goals	Pts
1.	Levski-Spartak Sofia	24	20	2	2	186:36	42
2.	HK CSKA Sofia	24	17	2	5	174:76	36
3.	HK Slavia Sofia	24	14	2	8	126:58	30
4.	Akademik Sofia	24	6	0	18	80:159	12
5.	Metallurg Pernik	24	0	0	24	44:281	0

== Final ==
- Levski-Spartak Sofia - HK CSKA Sofia 5:3/6:5
