= 1973–74 Bulgarian Hockey League season =

Bulgarian ice hockey season

The 1973–74 Bulgarian Hockey League season was the 22nd season of the Bulgarian Hockey League, the top level of ice hockey in Bulgaria. Eight teams participated in the league, and HK CSKA Sofia won the championship.

== Standings ==
	Club
1.	HK CSKA Sofia
2.	Levski-Spartak Sofia
3.	Minor Pernik
4.	Akademik Sofia
5.	HK Slavia Sofia
6.	Metallurg Pernik
7.	Lokomotive Sofia
8.	DZS Elin Pelin
