= 1993–94 Bulgarian Hockey League season =

Bulgarian ice hockey season

The 1993–94 Bulgarian Hockey League season was the 42nd season of the Bulgarian Hockey League, the top level of ice hockey in Bulgaria. Four teams participated in the league, and HK Slavia Sofia won the championship.

== Standings ==
	Club	GP	W	T	L	Goals	Pts
1.	HK Slavia Sofia	15	15	0	0	157:39	30
2.	HK Levski Sofia	15	10	0	5	159:62	20
3.	Metallurg Pernik	15	4	1	10	75:162	9
4.	HK CSKA Sofia/Akademik Sofia	15	0	1	14	43:171	1

Source: Elite Prospects
