= 1963–64 Bulgarian Hockey League season =

Bulgarian ice hockey season

The 1963–64 Bulgarian Hockey League season was the 12th season of the Bulgarian Hockey League, the top level of ice hockey in Bulgaria. 10 teams participated in the league, and HK CSKA Sofia won the championship.

== Standings ==
	Club
1.	HK CSKA Sofia
2.	Metallurg Pernik
3.	HPZ Georgi Dimitrov Sofia
4.	Armeec Sofia
5.	HK Levski Sofia
6.	Spartak Sofia
7.	Akademik Sofia
8.	HK Slavia Sofia
9.	Septemvri Sofia
10.	Dunaw Ruse
