= 1969–70 Bulgarian Hockey League season =

Bulgarian ice hockey season

The 1969–70 Bulgarian Hockey League season was the 18th season of the Bulgarian Hockey League, the top level of ice hockey in Bulgaria. Six teams participated in the league, and Krakra Pernik won the championship.

== Standings ==
	Club
1.	Krakra Pernik
2.	HK CSKA Sofia
3.	HK Slavia Sofia
4.	Levski-Spartak Sofia
5.	Akademik Sofia
6.	DZS Elin Pelin
