= 1981–82 Bulgarian Hockey League season =

Bulgarian ice hockey season

The 1981–82 Bulgarian Hockey League season was the 30th season of the Bulgarian Hockey League, the top level of ice hockey in Bulgaria. Six teams participated in the league, and Levski-Spartak Sofia won the championship.

== Standings ==
	Club	GP	W	T	L	Goals	Pts
1.	Levski-Spartak Sofia	25	21	0	4	130:56	42
2.	HK Slavia Sofia	25	18	0	7	130:50	36
3.	HK CSKA Sofia	25	16	0	9	142:68	32
4.	Akademik Sofia	25	10	0	15	89:111	20
5.	Metallurg Pernik	25	10	0	15	82:88	20
6.	Bulgarian Juniors	25	0	0	25	31:231	0
