= 1967–68 Bulgarian Hockey League season =

Bulgarian ice hockey season

The 1967–68 Bulgarian Hockey League season was the 16th season of the Bulgarian Hockey League, the top level of ice hockey in Bulgaria. Eight teams participated in the league, and Metallurg Pernik won the championship.

== Standings ==
	Club
1.	Metallurg Pernik
2.	HK CSKA Sofia
3.	HK Levski Sofia
4.	HK Slavia Sofia
5.	Akademik Sofia
6.	Lokomotive Sofia
7.	Sredez Sofia
8.	DZS Elin Pelin
