= 1980–81 Bulgarian Hockey League season =

Bulgarian ice hockey season

The 1980–81 Bulgarian Hockey League season was the 29th season of the Bulgarian Hockey League, the top level of ice hockey in Bulgaria. Five teams participated in the league, and Levski-Spartak Sofia won the championship.

== Standings ==
	Club	GP	W	T	L	Goals	Pts
1.	Levski-Spartak Sofia	20	15	2	3	85:50	32
2.	HK Slavia Sofia	20	8	9	3	74:59	25
3.	HK CSKA Sofia	20	8	7	5	85:70	23
4.	Metallurg Pernik	20	4	5	11	66:73	13
5.	Akademik Sofia	20	1	5	14	44:102	7

Source: Elite Prospects
