= 1992–93 Bulgarian Hockey League season =

Bulgarian ice hockey season

The 1992–93 Bulgarian Hockey League season was the 41st season of the Bulgarian Hockey League, the top level of ice hockey in Bulgaria. Five teams participated in the league, and HK Slavia Sofia won the championship.

== Regular season ==
	Club	GP	W	T	L	Goals	Pts
1.	HK Levski Sofia	20	16	1	3	218:47	33
2.	HK Slavia Sofia	20	16	1	3	162:54	33
3.	Metallurg Pernik	20	9	0	11	137:133	18
4.	HK CSKA Sofia	20	7	0	13	87:116	14
5.	Akademik Sofia	20	1	0	19	36:290	2

== Final ==
- HK Levski Sofia - HK Slavia Sofia 2:3/1:4
