= 1955–56 Bulgarian Hockey League season =

Bulgarian ice hockey season

The 1955–56 Bulgarian Hockey League season was the fifth season of the Bulgarian Hockey League, the top level of ice hockey in Bulgaria. Eight teams participated in the league, and Cerveno Zname Sofia won the championship.

== Standings ==
	Club
1.	Cerveno Zname Sofia
2.	Akademik Sofia
3.	HK Dinamo Sofia
4.	Torpedo Sofia
5.	CDNA Sofia
6.	Dunav Ruse
7.	Septemvri Sofia
8.	Spartak Sofia
