= 1954–55 Bulgarian Hockey League season =

Bulgarian ice hockey season

The 1954–55 Bulgarian Hockey League season was the fourth season of the Bulgarian Hockey League, the top level of ice hockey in Bulgaria. Seven teams participated in the league, and Torpedo Sofia won the championship.

== Standings ==
	Club	GP	W	T	L	GF–GA	Pts
1.	Torpedo Sofia	3	3	0	0	12:3	6
2.	CDNA Sofia	3	2	0	1	12:4	4
3.	Cerveno Zname Sofia	3	1	0	2	6:9	2
4.	Akademik Sofia	3	0	0	3	5:19	0
5.	HK Dinamo Sofia	?	?	?	?	?	?
6.	Septemwri Sofia	?	?	?	?	?	?
7.	Dunav Ruse	?	?	?	?	?	?

Source: Elite Prospects
