= 1964–65 Bulgarian Hockey League season =

Bulgarian ice hockey season

The 1964–65 Bulgarian Hockey League season was the 13th season of the Bulgarian Hockey League, the top level of ice hockey in Bulgaria. 10 teams participated in the league, and HK CSKA Sofia won the championship.

== Standings ==
	Club
1.	HK CSKA Sofia
2.	Metallurg Pernik
3.	HPZ Georgi Dimitrov Sofia
4.	Spartak Sofia
5.	HK Levski Sofia
6.	HK Slavia Sofia
7.	Akademik Sofia
8.	Dunav Ruse
9.	Armeec Sofia
10.	Septemvri Sofia
