= 1975–76 Bulgarian Hockey League season =

Bulgarian ice hockey season

The 1975–76 Bulgarian Hockey League season was the 24th season of the Bulgarian Hockey League, the top level of ice hockey in Bulgaria. Six teams participated in the league, and Levski-Spartak Sofia won the championship.

== Standings ==
| | Club |
|---|---|
| 1. | Levski-Spartak Sofia |
| 2. | HK Slavia Sofia |
| 3. | HK CSKA Sofia |
| 4. | Metallurg Pernik |
| 5. | Akademik Sofia |
| 6. | Khimik Stara Zagora |
