= 1987–88 Bulgarian Hockey League season =

Bulgarian ice hockey season

The 1987–88 Bulgarian Hockey League season was the 36th season of the Bulgarian Hockey League, the top level of ice hockey in Bulgaria. Five teams participated in the league, and HK Slavia Sofia won the championship.

== Regular season ==
	Club	Sp	S	U	N	Tore	Pts
1.	HK Slavia Sofia	16	10	5	1	133:49	25
2.	HK CSKA Sofia	16	11	3	2	106:40	25
3.	Levski-Spartak Sofia	16	9	4	3	87:37	22
4.	Metallurg Pernik	16	2	1	13	42:138	5
5.	Akademik Sofia	16	1	1	14	29:133	3

== Final ==
- HK Slavia Sofia - HK CSKA Sofia 2:4/6:1
