= 1991–92 Bulgarian Hockey League season =

Bulgarian ice hockey season

The 1991–92 Bulgarian Hockey League season was the 40th season of the Bulgarian Hockey League, the top level of ice hockey in Bulgaria. Five teams participated in the league, and HK Levski Sofia won the championship.

== Standings ==
	Club	GP	W	T	L	Goals	Pts
1.	HK Levski Sofia	24	21	2	1	188:49	44
2.	HK Slavia Sofia	24	15	5	4	178:64	35
3.	Metallurg Pernik	24	12	0	12	138:123	24
4.	HK CSKA Sofia	24	7	3	14	100:122	17
5.	Akademik Sofia	24	0	0	24	41:287	0

== Final ==
- HK Slavia Sofia - HK Levski Sofia 1:2 (2:4, 6:3, 1:5)
