= 1982–83 Bulgarian Hockey League season =

Bulgarian ice hockey season

The 1982–83 Bulgarian Hockey League season was the 31st season of the Bulgarian Hockey League, the top level of ice hockey in Bulgaria. Six teams participated in the league, and HK CSKA Sofia won the championship.

== Standings ==
	Club	GP	W	T	L	Goals	Pts
1.	HK CSKA Sofia	25	20	2	3	160:51	42
2.	Levski-Spartak Sofia	25	19	2	4	132:75	40
3.	Akademik Sofia	25	13	4	8	108:81	30
4.	HK Slavia Sofia	25	13	2	10	107:78	28
5.	Metallurg Pernik	25	2	2	21	80:152	6
6.	Bulgarian Juniors	25	1	2	22	50:200	4
