= 1977–78 Bulgarian Hockey League season =

Bulgarian ice hockey season

The 1977–78 Bulgarian Hockey League season was the 26th season of the Bulgarian Hockey League, the top level of ice hockey in Bulgaria. Five teams participated in the league, and Levski-Spartak Sofia won the championship.

== Standings ==
	Club
1.	Levski-Spartak Sofia
2.	HK CSKA Sofia
3.	HK Slavia Sofia
4.	Metallurg Pernik
5.	Akademik Sofia
