= 2016–17 Bulgarian Hockey League season =

Bulgarian ice hockey season

The 2016–17 Bulgarian Hockey League season was the 65th season of the Bulgarian Hockey League, the top level of ice hockey in Bulgaria. Five teams participated in the league, and Irbis-Skate Sofia won the championship.

== Regular season ==
	Club	GP	W	T	L	Goals	Pts
1.	Irbis-Skate Sofia	10	10	0	0	84:21	30
2.	HC CSKA Sofia	11	4	1	6	59:67	14
3.	HC Slavia Sofia	10	4	1	5	40:39	13
4.	HC NSA Sofia	11	3	2	6	48:68	12
5.	HC Levski Sofia	4	0	0	4	0:36	0
