= Konstantin Mihailov =

Bulgarian ice hockey and roller in-line hockey goaltender (born 1964)

- Born: 22 May 1964 (age 60); Sofia, People's Republic of Bulgaria
- Height: 178 cm (5 ft 10 in)
- Weight: 77 kg (170 lb; 12 st 2 lb)
- Position: Goaltender
- Caught: Left
- National team: Bulgaria
- Playing career: 1982–2019

Konstantin Mihailov (also Mihaylov; Bulgarian: Константин Михайлов; born 22 May 1964) is a Bulgarian former professional ice hockey and roller in-line hockey goaltender. He played in 28 Ice Hockey World Championships with the Bulgaria men's national ice hockey team, and three IIHF Inline Hockey World Championships with the Bulgaria men's national inline hockey team, then retired from international play at age 51. His lengthy international career was recognized by the International Ice Hockey Federation (IIHF) with receipt of the Torriani Award, which inducted him into the IIHF Hall of Fame in 2019.

== Early life ==
Mihailov was born on 22 May 1964, in Sofia, People's Republic of Bulgaria, and has a twin brother named Boris. The brothers started playing hockey at age 14, and learned on the outdoor Druzhba rink in Sofia. Their father Simeon played hockey until he was 40 years old, and wanted his boys to play as wingers, but Konstantin dreamed of being a goaltender. He innovated equipment for the position by reusing old hockey pants, and constructing a trapper and blocker. He also carried his own tools to fix goaltending equipment, since teams did not have a dedicated equipment manager then. He is credited as being the first Bulgarian to train specifically as a goaltender, and used tennis balls to develop his eye–hand coordination.

== Club hockey career ==
Mihailov had a lengthy professional ice hockey career mostly in the Bulgarian Hockey League, and two single seasons in Turkey and France. He played with HC Levski Sofia for twenty seasons from 1984 to 2004, which included a brief appearance with the Turkish Istanbul Paten Kulübü for part of the 2002–03 season. He played the 2004–05 season with the Galaxians d'Amneville in the French Ice Hockey Federation Division 2, then returned to Bulgaria. He played with Akademika Sofia from 2005 to 2007, HC Slavia Sofia from 2007 to 2012, HC CSKA Sofia from 2012 to 2014, and with Irbis-Skate Sofia from 2015 to 2019. He was named the best goaltender in the Bulgarian Hockey League during the 1991–92, 2011–12, and 2012–13 seasons; and was also named the best goaltender in Group A of the 2013–14 IIHF Continental Cup.

== International career ==
Mihailov first represented his country on the international level with the Bulgaria men's national under-18 ice hockey team. During the 1982 IIHF European U18 Championship Group B tournament hosted in Sofia, he was named the best goaltender at the event. He later played for the Bulgaria men's national junior ice hockey team at the 1983 World Junior Ice Hockey Championships, and the 1984 World Junior Ice Hockey Championships.

Mihailov made his debut with the Bulgaria men's national ice hockey team during the 1985 World Ice Hockey Championships Group C tournament in Megève, France. He went on to play in 28 Ice Hockey World Championships with Bulgaria, which concluded with the 2014 IIHF World Championship Division III, at age 49. During this time, he also played in three Winter Olympic Games qualifying tournaments in 2004, 2008, and 2015. Mihailov later said that he played as long he did for the love for the game, and there was nobody as good as him in Bulgaria. His career was extended in 2009, with the unexpected death of his successor, Kiril Vajarov. He was named the best goaltender at both Group C of the 1990 Men's World Ice Hockey Championships, and the 2006 IIHF World Championship Division II. He led Bulgaria to a silver medal at the 2006 IIHF World Championship Division II, a bronze medal at the 2012 IIHF World Championship Division II, and the gold medal at the 2014 IIHF World Championship Division III.

Mihailov also played for the Bulgaria men's national inline hockey team at three IIHF Inline Hockey World Championships, and said that there was "not a big difference between ice hockey and inline hockey". During the European qualification portion of the 2015 IIHF Inline Hockey World Championship Division I, Mihailov was given a standing ovation and was named the event's best goaltender. He was 51 years old at the time, which was his last appearance with the national team.

== Later life and honors ==
Mihailov became a goaltender coach in Bulgaria after retiring from playing, with the goal of someone having more success than him. He remained active playing amateur hockey, and has a son who played as a professional goaltender. The Hockey Hall of Fame wrote that Mihailov "one of the best goaltenders in the history of Bulgarian hockey".

Mihailov was honored by the IIHF in 2019, as a recipient of the Torriani Award to recognize his international hockey career. The formal ceremony took place at the 2019 Men's World Ice Hockey Championships in Bratislava, on 26 May 2019. By receiving the Torriani Award, Mihailov was also indcuted into the IIHF Hall of Fame.
