= 1961–62 Bulgarian Hockey League season =

Bulgarian ice hockey season

The 1961–62 Bulgarian Hockey League season was the 10th season of the Bulgarian Hockey League, the top level of ice hockey in Bulgaria. Eight teams participated in the league, and Cerveno Zname Sofia won the championship.

== Standings ==
	Club	GP	W	T	L	Goals	Pts
1.	Cerveno Zname Sofia	7	7	0	0	43:11	14
2.	CDNA Sofia	7	5	0	2	29:10	10
3.	Akademik Sofia	7	5	0	2	23:10	10
4.	HK Slavia Sofia	7	4	0	3	20:13	8
5.	Lenin Pernik	7	4	0	3	19:14	8
6.	Lokomotive Sofia	7	3	0	4	11:17	6
7.	HK Levski Sofia	7	1	0	6	10:23	2
8.	Botev Ihtiman	7	0	0	7	6:39	0
