= 1983–84 Bulgarian Hockey League season =

Bulgarian ice hockey season

The 1983–84 Bulgarian Hockey League season was the 32nd season of the Bulgarian Hockey League, the top level of ice hockey in Bulgaria. Five teams participated in the league, and HK CSKA Sofia won the championship.

== Standings ==
	Club	GP	W	T	L	Goals	Pts
1.	HK CSKA Sofia	16	13	2	1	124:41	28
2.	Levski-Spartak Sofia	16	11	2	3	97:53	24
3.	HK Slavia Sofia	16	9	2	5	88:49	20
4.	Akademik Sofia	16	2	3	11	51:98	7
5.	Metallurg Pernik	16	0	1	15	34:153	1
