= List of indoor arenas in Bulgaria =

The following is a list of indoor arenas in Bulgaria. The venues are ordered by their final capacity after construction for seating-only events. There is more capacity if standing room is included (e.g. for concerts).

== Current arenas ==
Photo	Location	Arena	Date built	Capacity	Tenant/use	Notes
	Sofia	Arena Sofia	2011	12,373	PBC Lukoil Academic; Bulgaria men's national volleyball team Sofia Open (ATP 250)	As of 2020, one of the 15 largest capacity tennis stadiums. Fourth largest indoor arena on the Balkans, after Stark Arena (Serbia), O.A.C.A. Olympic Indoor Hall (Greece), and Arena Zagreb (Croatia)..Maximum capacity of 17,906 for concerts.
	Burgas	Arena Burgas	2023	6,500	BC Chernomorets	Capacity of 6,500 for athletic competitions with extension of up to 8,000 seats during sporting events. Maximum capacity of 14,500 for concerts.
	Plovdiv	Kolodruma	2015	6,062	Plovdiv Cycling Club "Tsar Simeon 1898"; VC Maritsa Plovdiv	Only active indoor velodrome in Bulgaria, largest one on the Balkans.
	Varna	Palace of Culture and Sports	1968	5,116	BC Cherno More Port Varna; Bulgaria national volleyball team	Fully renovated in 2015.
	Ruse	OZK Arena	2015	5,100	WBC Dunav 8806	Construction began in 1976, was frozen for almost three decades before commencing again in 2012.
	Sofia	Winter Sports Palace	1982	4,600	HC CSKA Sofia; HC Levski Sofia; Ice Devils Sofia	
	Botevgrad	Arena Botevgrad	2014	4,500	BC Balkan Botevgrad	
	Samokov	Arena Samelyon	2025	2,700	BC Rilski Sportist	
	Plovdiv	Arena S.I.L.A	2017	2,500	VC Maritsa Plovdiv VC Lokomotiv Avia	
	Sofia	Asics Arena	1968	2,270	ateletics	former Festivalna, renovated in 2017
	Sofia	Universiada Hall	1961	2,400	BC Levski Sofia	
	Samokov	Arena Samokov	2008	2,000	BC Rilski Sportist	
	Panagyurishte	Arena Asarel	2015	2,000	BC Panagyurishte; HC Panagyurishte	
	Sofia	Slavia Ice Center	1972	2,000	HC Slavia Sofia	
	Gabrovo	Orlovets Hall	1991	1,920	BC Chardafon Gabrovo	Construction began in 1971, went on and off for 20 years.
	Yambol	Diana	1964	1,800	BC Yambol	Renovation started in end of 2024 and finished in 2026.
	Sofia	Sport Hall Levski Sofia	2020	1,700	VC Levski Sofia	
	Pernik	Boris Giuderov Hall	1974	1,640	BC Minyor_2015	Renovated in 2024
	Dupnitsa	Dupnitsa Hall	2015	1,505	VC Marek Union-Ivkoni	
	Dobrich	Dobrotitsa Hall	1983	1,500	VC Dobrudja 07	
	Pazardzhik	Vasil Levski Hall	1979	1,500	VC Hebar	Renovated
	Pleven	Balkanstroy Hall	1976	1,500	BC Spartak Pleven	
	Sofia	Hristo Botev Hall	1980	1,500	Bulgaria national volleyball team	
	Burgas	Mladost Hall	1987	1,500	Neftochimic 2010	
	Shumen	Arena Shumen	2018	1,494	BC Shumen; HC Shumen 61; HC Shumen 98	
	Stara Zagora	Municipal Hall	1959	1,300	BC Beroe	Renovated in 2000
	Dimitrovgrad	Sportna Zala Mladost	1974	1,230	BC Compact Basket VC Rakovski Acrobatic gymnastics	Fully renovated in 2018.
	Ruse	Dunav Hall		1,200	WBC Dunav 8806	
	Slivnitsa	Arena Slivnitsa	2014	1,050	HC Slivnitsa	
	Plovdiv	Plovdiv University Sports Hall	2012	1,037	Plovdiv University sports teams VC Maritsa Plovdiv VC Lokomotiv Avia	
	Gorna Malina	Arena Gorna Malina		1,000	VC Zvezdets	
	Burgas	Boycho Branzov Hall		1,000	BC Chernomorets	
	Plovdiv	Stroitel Hall		1,000	BC Academic Plovdiv	
	Sofia	Vasil Simov Hall	1985	1,000	VC CSKA Sofia	
	Varna	Hristo Borisov Hall	1991	1,000	BC Cherno More	
	Sofia	Lokomotiv Hall		500	SCDS Lokomotiv Sofia	

== Under construction/proposed ==
Photo	Location	Arena	Capacity	Status	Opening	Notes
	Stara Zagora	New Stara Zagora Hall	5,200	Prep	TBA	

== See also ==
- List of indoor arenas in Europe
- List of indoor arenas by capacity
- Lists of stadiums
