= 1965–66 Bulgarian Hockey League season =

Bulgarian ice hockey season

The 1965–66 Bulgarian Hockey League season was the 14th season of the Bulgarian Hockey League, the top level of ice hockey in Bulgaria. 10 teams participated in the league, and HK CSKA Sofia won the championship.

== Standings ==
	Club
1.	HK CSKA Sofia
2.	Metallurg Pernik
3.	HK Levski Sofia
4.	Lokomotive Sofia
5.	HK Slavia Sofia
6.	Spartak Sofia
7.	Septemvri Sofia
8.	Akademik Sofia
9.	Sredets Sofia
10.	Dunav Ruse
