= 1978–79 Bulgarian Hockey League season =

Bulgarian ice hockey season

The 1978–79 Bulgarian Hockey League season was the 27th season of the Bulgarian Hockey League, the top level of ice hockey in Bulgaria. Five teams participated in the league, and Levski-Spartak Sofia won the championship.

== Standings ==
	Club
1.	Levski-Spartak Sofia
2.	Metallurg Pernik
3.	HK Slavia Sofia
4.	HK CSKA Sofia
5.	Akademik Sofia
