= 1966–67 Bulgarian Hockey League season =

Bulgarian ice hockey season

The 1966–67 Bulgarian Hockey League season was the 15th season of the Bulgarian Hockey League, the top level of ice hockey in Bulgaria. 10 teams participated in the league, and HK CSKA Sofia won the championship.

== Standings ==
	Club
1.	HK CSKA Sofia
2.	HK Levski Sofia
3.	Lokomotive Sofia
4.	Metallurg Pernik
5.	Septemvri Sofia
6.	HK Slavia Sofia
7.	Akademik Sofia
8.	Sredez Sofia
9.	Spartak Sofia
10.	DZS Elin Pelin
