= 1957–58 Bulgarian Hockey League season =

Bulgarian ice hockey season

The 1957–58 Bulgarian Hockey League season was the sixth season of the Bulgarian Hockey League, the top level of ice hockey in Bulgaria. Nine teams participated in the league, and Cerveno Zname Sofia won the championship.

== Standings ==
| | Club |
|---|---|
| 1. | Cerveno Zname Sofia |
| 2. | Akademik Sofia |
| 3. | CDNA Sofia |
| 4. | HK Levski Sofia |
| 5. | Dunav Ruse |
| 6. | Metallurg Pernik |
| 7. | Spartak Sofia |
| 8. | Lokomotive Sofia |
| 9. | Septemvri Sofia |
