= 2013–14 Bulgarian Hockey League season =

Bulgarian ice hockey season

The 2013–14 Bulgarian Hockey League season was the 62nd season of the Bulgarian Hockey League, the top level of ice hockey in Bulgaria. Four teams participated in the league, and HC CSKA Sofia won the championship.

== Participating teams ==
HC Levski Sofia withdrew from the league due to financial issues and were replaced in the competition by the national junior team.

- HC NSA Sofia
- HC Slavia Sofia
- HC CSKA Sofia
- Bulgaria men's national junior ice hockey team

== Regular season ==
The championship was cancelled in mid-January after only eight games had been played in total. HC CSKA Sofia was recognized as Bulgarian champions.

	Club	GP	W	T	L	Goals	Pts
1.	HC CSKA Sofia	5	5	0	0	50:10	15
2.	HC Slavia Sofia					-:-	11
3.	HC NSA Sofia		1		1	-:-	4
4.	Bulgaria U20	5	1	0	4	-:-	3
