= 2024–25 IIHF Continental Cup =

2024–2025 IIHF Continental Cup

Tournament details
- Dates: 20 September 2024 – 19 January 2025
- Teams: 20

Final positions
- Champions: (United Kingdom) Cardiff Devils (1st title)
- Runners-up: (France) Brûleurs de Loups
- Third place: (Poland) GKS Katowice
- Fourth place: (Kazakhstan) HC Arlan

The 2024–25 Continental Cup was the 27th edition of the IIHF Continental Cup, Europe's second-tier ice hockey club competition organised by International Ice Hockey Federation. The competition began on 20 September 2024 and the final tournament was played from 16 to 19 January 2025.

== Qualified teams ==
Team	Qualification
Enter in the third round
(Denmark) Aalborg Pirates	2023–24 Metal Ligaen champions
(France) Brûleurs de Loups	2023–24 Coupe de France champions
(Kazakhstan) Arlan Kokshetau	2023–24 Kazakhstan Hockey Championship champions
(Poland) GKS Katowice	2023–24 Polska Hokej Liga runners-up
(Slovakia) Vlci Žilina	2023–24 Slovak 1. Liga champions
(United Kingdom) Cardiff Devils	2023–24 Second place finish in EIHL
Enter in the second round
(Hungary) Ferencvárosi TC	2023–24 OB I bajnokság champions
(Italy) Rittner Buam	2023-24 IHL – Elite champions
(Latvia) HK Mogo	2023–24 Latvian Hockey League champions
(Romania) CSM Corona Brașov	2023–24 Romanian Hockey League champions
(Ukraine) Sokil Kyiv	2023–24 Ukrainian Hockey Championship champions
(Slovenia) Acroni Jesenice	2023–24 Slovenian Ice Hockey League runners-up
Enter in the first round
(Belgium) Bulldogs Liège	2023–24 BeNe League champions
(Bulgaria) Irbis-Skate Sofia	2023–24 Bulgarian Hockey League champions
(Croatia) KHL Sisak	2023–24 Croatian Ice Hockey League champions
(Estonia) Narva PSK	2023–24 Meistriliiga champions
(Iceland) Skautafelag Reykjavikur	2023–24 Icelandic Hockey League champions
(Lithuania) Energija/GV Elektrėnai	2023–24 Lithuania Hockey League champions
(Serbia) SKHL Crvena zvezda	2023–24 Serbian Hockey League champions
(Spain) CH Jaca	2023–24 Liga Nacional de Hockey Hielo champions

== First round ==
=== Group A ===
The Group A tournament was played in Sofia, Bulgaria, from 20 to 22 September 2024.

Pos	Team	Pld	W	OTW	OTL	L	GF	GA	GD	Pts	Qualification
1	(Croatia) KHL Sisak	3	3	0	0	0	28	3	+25	9	Second round
2	(Belgium) Bulldogs Liège	3	2	0	0	1	22	9	+13	6	
3	(Serbia) SKHL Crvena zvezda	3	1	0	0	2	8	10	−2	3	
4	(Bulgaria) Irbis-Skate Sofia (H)	3	0	0	0	3	4	40	−36	0	

Source: IIHF
(H) Host

All times are local (UTC+3).

20 September 2024; 15:30	SKHL Crvena zvezda (Serbia)	1–2 (0–0, 1–0, 0–2)	(Belgium) Bulldogs Liège	Winter Sports Palace, Sofia; Attendance: 50

Game reference
12 min	Penalties	6 min
32	Shots	42

20 September 2024; 19:00	KHL Sisak (Croatia)	15–1 (4–0, 7–0, 4–1)	(Bulgaria) Irbis-Skate Sofia	Winter Sports Palace, Sofia; Attendance: 250

Game reference
4 min	Penalties	28 min
72	Shots	7

21 September 2024; 15:30	Irbis-Skate Sofia (Bulgaria)	1–6 (0–4, 1–1, 0–1)	(Serbia) SKHL Crvena zvezda	Winter Sports Palace, Sofia; Attendance: 100

Game reference
16 min	Penalties	12 min
20	Shots	33

21 September 2024; 19:00	KHL Sisak (Croatia)	6–1 (3–0, 2–1, 1–0)	(Belgium) Bulldogs Liège	Winter Sports Palace, Sofia; Attendance: 80

Game reference
14 min	Penalties	53 min
47	Shots	18

22 September 2024; 15:30	SKHL Crvena zvezda (Serbia)	1–7 (0–1, 0–2, 1–4)	(Croatia) KHL Sisak	Winter Sports Palace, Sofia; Attendance: 66

Game reference
14 min	Penalties	14 min
17	Shots	56

22 September 2024; 19:00	Bulldogs Liège (Belgium)	19–2 (7–0, 6–1, 6–1)	(Bulgaria) Irbis-Skate Sofia	Winter Sports Palace, Sofia; Attendance: 250

Game reference
0 min	Penalties	16 min
56	Shots	15

=== Group B ===
The Group B tournament was played in Narva, Estonia, from 20 to 22 September 2024.

Pos	Team	Pld	W	OTW	OTL	L	GF	GA	GD	Pts	Qualification
1	(Lithuania) Energija/GV Elektrėnai	3	3	0	0	0	17	4	+13	9	Second round
2	(Spain) CH Jaca	3	1	0	1	1	11	13	−2	4	
3	(Estonia) Narva PSK (H)	3	1	0	0	2	12	15	−3	3	
4	(Iceland) Skautafelag Reykjavikur	3	0	1	0	2	10	18	−8	2	

Source: IIHF
(H) Host

All times are local (UTC+3).

20 September 2024; 15:00	Energija/GV Elektrėnai (Lithuania)	5–0 (2–0, 1–0, 2–0)	(Iceland) Skautafelag Reykjavikur	Narva Ice Hall, Narva; Attendance: 104

Game reference
10 min	Penalties	4 min
61	Shots	18

20 September 2024; 19:00	Narva PSK (Estonia)	1–5 (0–2, 0–1, 1–2)	(Spain) CH Jaca	Narva Ice Hall, Narva; Attendance: 893

Game reference
6 min	Penalties	4 min
29	Shots	27

21 September 2024; 13:00	CH Jaca (Spain)	1–6 (0–2, 0–0, 1–4)	(Lithuania) Energija/GV Elektrėnai	Narva Ice Hall, Narva; Attendance: 145

Game reference
8 min	Penalties	10 min
27	Shots	45

21 September 2024; 17:00	Narva PSK (Estonia)	8–4 (1–0, 3–1, 4–3)	(Iceland) Skautafelag Reykjavikur	Narva Ice Hall, Narva; Attendance: 991

Game reference
18 min	Penalties	14 min
45	Shots	29

22 September 2024; 13:00	Skautafelag Reykjavikur (Iceland)	6–5 OT (3–2, 1–2, 1–1) (OT: 1–0)	(Spain) CH Jaca	Narva Ice Hall, Narva; Attendance: 83

Game reference
20 min	Penalties	33 min
28	Shots	44

22 September 2024; 17:00	Energija/GV Elektrėnai (Lithuania)	6–3 (0–1, 3–0, 3–2)	(Estonia) Narva PSK	Narva Ice Hall, Narva; Attendance: 1,156

Game reference
8 min	Penalties	16 min
57	Shots	26

== Second round ==
=== Group C ===
The Group C tournament was played in Ritten, Italy, from 18 to 20 October 2024.

Pos	Team	Pld	W	OTW	OTL	L	GF	GA	GD	Pts	Qualification
1	(Italy) Rittner Buam (H)	3	3	0	0	0	20	9	+11	9	Third round
2	(Slovenia) Acroni Jesenice	3	2	0	0	1	11	8	+3	6	
3	(Croatia) KHL Sisak	3	1	0	0	2	7	15	−8	3	
4	(Ukraine) Sokil Kyiv	3	0	0	0	3	8	14	−6	0	

Source: IIHF
(H) Host

All times are local (UTC+2).

18 October 2024; 16:00	Acroni Jesenice (Slovenia)	3–1 (0–0, 1–1, 2–0)	(Croatia) KHL Sisak	Arena Ritten, Ritten; Attendance: 162

Game reference
37 min	Penalties	12 min
44	Shots	20

18 October 2024; 20:00	Rittner Buam (Italy)	5–4 (1–1, 3–1, 1–2)	(Ukraine) Sokil Kyiv	Arena Ritten, Ritten; Attendance: 621

Game reference
6 min	Penalties	6 min
36	Shots	27

19 October 2024; 16:00	Acroni Jesenice (Slovenia)	5–2 (2–1, 3–1, 0–0)	(Ukraine) Sokil Kyiv	Arena Ritten, Ritten; Attendance: 176

Game reference
12 min	Penalties	10 min
40	Shots	28

19 October 2024; 20:00	KHL Sisak (Croatia)	2–10 (1–5, 0–2, 1–3)	(Italy) Rittner Buam	Arena Ritten, Ritten; Attendance: 893

Game reference
6 min	Penalties	6 min
21	Shots	39

20 October 2024; 16:00	Sokil Kyiv (Ukraine)	2–4 (1–2, 0–1, 1–1)	(Croatia) KHL Sisak	Arena Ritten, Ritten; Attendance: 176

Game reference
4 min	Penalties	6 min
38	Shots	22

20 October 2024; 20:00	Rittner Buam (Italy)	5–3 (1–1, 2–2, 2–0)	(Slovenia) Acroni Jesenice	Arena Ritten, Ritten; Attendance: 738

Game reference
21 min	Penalties	10 min
27	Shots	35

=== Group D ===
The Group D tournament was played in Brașov, Romania, from 18 to 20 October 2024.

Pos	Team	Pld	W	OTW	OTL	L	GF	GA	GD	Pts	Qualification
1	(Romania) CSM Corona Brașov (H)	3	1	2	0	0	15	10	+5	7 (Note: Mogo Riga 3–4 (OT) CSM Corona Brașov)	Third round
2	(Latvia) Mogo Riga	3	2	0	1	0	14	11	+3	7	
3	(Hungary) Ferencvárosi TC	3	1	0	1	1	12	10	+2	4	
4	(Lithuania) Energija/GV Elektrėnai	3	0	0	0	3	8	18	−10	0	

Source: IIHF
(H) Host
Notes:

All times are local (UTC+3).

18 October 2024; 14:30	Ferencvárosi TC (Hungary)	6–0 (5–0, 1–0, 0–0)	(Lithuania) Energija/GV Elektrėnai	Brașov Olympic Ice Rink, Brașov; Attendance: 154

Game reference
6 min	Penalties	4 min
34	Shots	27

18 October 2024; 18:30	Mogo Riga (Latvia)	3–4 OT (2–0, 1–3, 0–0) (OT: 0–1)	(Romania) CSM Corona Brașov	Brașov Olympic Ice Rink, Brașov; Attendance: 1,157

Game reference
14 min	Penalties	10 min
29	Shots	30

19 October 2024; 14:30	Energija/GV Elektrėnai (Lithuania)	5–6 (0–2, 3–3, 2–1)	(Latvia) Mogo Riga	Brașov Olympic Ice Rink, Brașov; Attendance: 167

Game reference
2 min	Penalties	2 min
31	Shots	41

19 October 2024; 18:30	Ferencvárosi TC (Hungary)	4–5 OT (1–0, 2–2, 1–2) (OT: 0–1)	(Romania) CSM Corona Brașov	Brașov Olympic Ice Rink, Brașov; Attendance: 1,238

Game reference
16 min	Penalties	12 min
53	Shots	44

20 October 2024; 14:30	Mogo Riga (Latvia)	5–2 (3–0, 2–1, 0–1)	(Hungary) Ferencvárosi TC	Brașov Olympic Ice Rink, Brașov; Attendance: 147

Game reference
2 min	Penalties	10 min
39	Shots	25

20 October 2024; 18:30	CSM Corona Brașov (Romania)	6–3 (1–0, 2–1, 3–2)	(Lithuania) Energija/GV Elektrėnai	Brașov Olympic Ice Rink, Brașov; Attendance: 1,144

Game reference
12 min	Penalties	4 min
43	Shots	44

== Third round ==
=== Group E ===
The Group E tournament was played in Žilina, Slovakia, from 15 to 17 November 2024.

Pos	Team	Pld	W	OTW	OTL	L	GF	GA	GD	Pts	Qualification
1	(Kazakhstan) HC Arlan	3	2	0	1	0	11	8	+3	7	Final round
2	(United Kingdom) Cardiff Devils	3	2	0	0	1	12	8	+4	6	Final round
3	(Slovakia) Vlci Žilina (H)	3	1	1	0	1	10	7	+3	5	
4	(Italy) Rittner Buam	3	0	0	0	3	2	12	−10	0	

Source: IIHF
(H) Host

All times are local (UTC+1).

15 November 2024; 14:00	Cardiff Devils (United Kingdom)	5–1 (2–0, 2–1, 1–0)	(Italy) Rittner Buam	Žilina Ice Stadium, Žilina; Attendance: 220

Game reference
10 min	Penalties	12 min
39	Shots	27

15 November 2024; 18:00	HC Arlan (Kazakhstan)	3–4 OT (1–2, 1–1, 1–0) (OT: 0–1)	(Slovakia) Vlci Žilina	Žilina Ice Stadium, Žilina; Attendance: 1,846

Game reference
56 min	Penalties	12 min
27	Shots	28

16 November 2024; 13:00	Rittner Buam (Italy)	1–2 (0–0, 1–1, 0–1)	(Kazakhstan) HC Arlan	Žilina Ice Stadium, Žilina; Attendance: 148

Game reference
2 min	Penalties	6 min
22	Shots	57

16 November 2024; 17:00	Cardiff Devils (United Kingdom)	4–1 (1–0, 1–1, 2–0)	(Slovakia) Vlci Žilina	Žilina Ice Stadium, Žilina; Attendance: 2,015

Game reference
4 min	Penalties	29 min
23	Shots	21

17 November 2024; 14:00	HC Arlan (Kazakhstan)	6–3 (1–1, 2–2, 3–0)	(United Kingdom) Cardiff Devils	Žilina Ice Stadium, Žilina; Attendance: 231

Game reference
37 min	Penalties	79 min
26	Shots	25

17 November 2024; 18:00	Vlci Žilina (Slovakia)	5–0 (1–0, 3–0, 1–0)	(Italy) Rittner Buam	Žilina Ice Stadium, Žilina; Attendance: 1,493

Game reference
2 min	Penalties	6 min
40	Shots	21

=== Group F ===
The Group F tournament was played in Aalborg, Denmark, from 15 to 17 November 2024.

Pos	Team	Pld	W	OTW	OTL	L	GF	GA	GD	Pts	Qualification
1	(Poland) GKS Katowice	3	2	0	0	1	15	7	+8	6 (Note: GKS Katowice 3 Pts, +1 GD; Brûleurs de Loups 3 Pts, 0 GD; Aalborg Pirates 3 Pts, –1 GD)	Final round
2	(France) Brûleurs de Loups	3	2	0	0	1	18	8	+10	6	Final round
3	(Denmark) Aalborg Pirates (H)	3	2	0	0	1	9	9	0	6	
4	(Romania) CSM Corona Brașov	3	0	0	0	3	5	23	−18	0	

Source: IIHF
(H) Host
Notes:

All times are local (UTC+1).

15 November 2024; 15:00	GKS Katowice (Poland)	9–2 (2–1, 3–1, 4–0)	(Romania) CSM Corona Brașov	Sparekassen Danmark Arena, Aalborg; Attendance: 475

Game reference
6 min	Penalties	14 min
51	Shots	19

15 November 2024; 19:00	Aalborg Pirates (Denmark)	5–3 (0–2, 3–0, 2–1)	(France) Brûleurs de Loups	Sparekassen Danmark Arena, Aalborg; Attendance: 2,187

Game reference
12 min	Penalties	8 min
45	Shots	36

16 November 2024; 14:00	GKS Katowice (Poland)	2–4 (2–1, 0–1, 0–2)	(France) Brûleurs de Loups	Sparekassen Danmark Arena, Aalborg; Attendance: 656

Game reference
35 min	Penalties	31 min
22	Shots	42

16 November 2024; 18:00	CSM Corona Brașov (Romania)	2–3 (1–1, 0–1, 1–1)	(Denmark) Aalborg Pirates	Sparekassen Danmark Arena, Aalborg; Attendance: 2,169

Game reference
14 min	Penalties	6 min
14	Shots	27

17 November 2024; 14:00	Brûleurs de Loups (France)	11–1 (5–0, 3–1, 3–0)	(Romania) CSM Corona Brașov	Sparekassen Danmark Arena, Aalborg; Attendance: 352

Game reference
4 min	Penalties	8 min
37	Shots	27

17 November 2024; 18:00	Aalborg Pirates (Denmark)	1–4 (1–2, 0–0, 0–2)	(Poland) GKS Katowice	Sparekassen Danmark Arena, Aalborg; Attendance: 2,365

Game reference
10 min	Penalties	16 min
35	Shots	29

== Final round ==
The final tournament took place in Cardiff, United Kingdom, from 16 to 19 January 2025.

Pos	Team	Pld	W	OTW	OTL	L	GF	GA	GD	Pts	
1	(United Kingdom) Cardiff Devils (H)	2	2	0	0	0	12	4	+8	6	Continental Cup winners
2	(France) Brûleurs de Loups	2	0	1	0	1	4	8	−4	2	
3	(Poland) GKS Katowice	2	0	0	1	1	5	9	−4	1	
–	(Kazakhstan) HC Arlan	0	0	0	0	0	0	0	0	0	Withdrawn

Source: IIHF
(H) Host

All times are local (UTC±0).

16 January 2025; 19:30	GKS Katowice (Poland)	3–6 (0–0, 1–5, 2–1)	(United Kingdom) Cardiff Devils	Vindico Arena, Cardiff; Attendance: 2,874

Game reference
6 min	Penalties	6 min
27	Shots	49

18 January 2025; 18:00	Brûleurs de Loups (France)	3–2 SO (1–0, 0–2, 1–0, 0–0, 1–0)	(Poland) GKS Katowice	Vindico Arena, Cardiff; Attendance: 2,765

Game reference
18 min	Penalties	6 min
27	Shots	39

19 January 2025; 18:00	Cardiff Devils (United Kingdom)	6–1 (1–1, 4–0, 1–0)	(France) Brûleurs de Loups	Vindico Arena, Cardiff; Attendance: 3,110

Game reference
10 min	Penalties	18 min
46	Shots	19
