= 1996–97 Bulgarian Hockey League season =

Bulgarian ice hockey season

The Bulgarian Hockey League's 1996–97 season was its 45th season, determining the best team at the top level of Bulgarian ice hockey. Five teams competed, with HK Slavia Sofia winning the championship.

== Regular season ==
	Club	GP	W	T	L	Goals	Pts
1.	HK Slavia Sofia	8	6	1	1	57:16	13
2.	HK Metallurg Pernik	8	6	1	1	40:16	13
3.	HK Levski Sofia	8	3	1	4	51:29	7
4.	Akademik Sofia	8	3	1	4	36:35	7
5.	HK CSKA Sofia	8	0	0	8	12:100	0

== Playoffs ==
=== 3rd place ===
- HK Levski Sofia - Akademik Sofia 3:0 (6:2, 3:2, 8:3)

=== Final ===
- HK Slavia Sofia - HK Metallurg Pernik 3:0 (6:2, 3:1, 5:1)
