= 1952–53 Bulgarian Hockey League season =

Bulgarian ice hockey season

The 1952–53 Bulgarian Hockey League season was the second season of the Bulgarian Hockey League, the top level of ice hockey in Bulgaria. Seven teams participated in the league, and HK Udarnik Sofia won the championship.

== Standings ==
	Club
1.	HK Udarnik Sofia
2.	Cerveno Zname Sofia
3.	CDNA Sofia
4.	Akademik Sofia
5.	Stroitel Sofia
6.	HK Dinamo Sofia
7.	Lokomotive Sofia
