= 2015–16 Bulgarian Hockey League season =

Bulgarian ice hockey season

The 2015–16 Bulgarian Hockey League season was the 64th season of the Bulgarian Hockey League, the top level of ice hockey in Bulgaria. Four teams participated in the league, and Irbis-Skate Sofia won the championship.

== Regular season ==
	Club	GP	W	T	L	Goals	Pts
1.	Irbis-Skate Sofia	5	5	0	0	40:12	15
2.	HC Slavia Sofia	5	3	0	2	19:18	9
3.	HC CSKA Sofia	3	1	0	2	9:12	3
4.	HC NSA Sofia	5	0	0	5	13:39	0
