= 1958–59 Bulgarian Hockey League season =

Bulgarian ice hockey season

The 1958–59 Bulgarian Hockey League season was the seventh season of the Bulgarian Hockey League, the top level of ice hockey in Bulgaria. Nine teams participated in the league, and Cerveno Zname Sofia won the championship.

== Standings ==
	Club
1.	Cerveno Zname Sofia
2.	Lenin Pernik
3.	CDNA Sofia
4.	HK Levski Sofia
5.	Dunav Ruse
6.	Akademik Sofia
7.	Septemvri Sofia
8.	HPZ Georgi Dimitrov Sofia
9.	Spartak Sofia
