= 2019–20 Bulgarian Hockey League season =

Bulgarian ice hockey season

The 2019–20 Bulgarian Hockey League season was the 68th season of the Bulgarian Hockey League, the top level of ice hockey in Bulgaria. Five teams participated in the league, and Irbis-Skate Sofia won the championship.

== Regular season ==
| | Club | GP | W | T | L | Goals | Pts |
|---|---|---|---|---|---|---|---|
| 1. | Irbis-Skate Sofia | 12 | 12 | 0 | 0 | 112:33 | 36 |
| 2. | HC NSA Sofia | 12 | 9 | 0 | 3 | 90:45 | 27 |
| 3. | HC Slavia Sofia | 12 | 4 | 1 | 7 | 98:82 | 14 |
| 4. | HC CSKA Sofia | 12 | 4 | 1 | 7 | 42:77 | 13 |
| 5. | Red Star Sofia | 12 | 0 | 0 | 12 | 26:131 | 0 |
