= 1995–96 Bulgarian Hockey League season =

Bulgarian ice hockey season

The 1995–96 Bulgarian Hockey League season was the 44th season of the Bulgarian Hockey League, the top level of ice hockey in Bulgaria. Five teams participated in the league, and HK Slavia Sofia won the championship.

== Regular season ==
	Club	GP	W	T	L	Goals	Pts
1.	HK Slavia Sofia	16	14	0	2	137:37	28
2.	HK Levski Sofia	16	14	0	2	146:39	28
3.	HK Metallurg Pernik	16	8	0	8	91:84	16
4.	Akademik Sofia	16	4	0	12	53:121	8
5.	HK CSKA Sofia	16	0	0	16	48:232	0

== Final ==
- HK Slavia Sofia - HK Levski Sofia 2:1 (11:5, 1:2, 3:1)
