= 1971–72 Bulgarian Hockey League season =

Bulgarian ice hockey season

The 1971–72 Bulgarian Hockey League season was the 20th season of the Bulgarian Hockey League, the top level of ice hockey in Bulgaria. Seven teams participated in the league, and HK CSKA Sofia won the championship.

== Standings ==
	Club
1.	HK CSKA Sofia
2.	Levski-Spartak Sofia
3.	Krakra Pernik
4.	Akademik Sofia
5.	HK Slavia Sofia
6.	Lokomotive Sofia
7.	DZS Elin Pelin
