= 2007–08 Bulgarian Hockey League season =

Bulgarian ice hockey season

The 2007–08 Bulgarian Hockey League season was the 56th season of the Bulgarian Hockey League, the top level of ice hockey in Bulgaria. Four teams participated in Group A of the league, and HK Slavia Sofia won the championship. Group B also consisted of four teams, and was won by Ledenite Dyavoli Sofia.

== Standings ==
=== Group A ===
| | Club | GP | W | T | L | Goals | Pts |
|---|---|---|---|---|---|---|---|
| 1. | HK Slavia Sofia | 3 | 3 | 0 | 0 | 31:4 | 6 |
| 2. | HK CSKA Sofia | 3 | 2 | 0 | 1 | 22:10 | 4 |
| 3. | HK Levski Sofia | 3 | 1 | 0 | 2 | 12:21 | 2 |
| 4. | HK Spartak Sofia | 3 | 0 | 0 | 3 | 10:40 | 0 |

=== Group B ===
| | Club | GP | W | OTW | OTL | L | Goals | Pts |
|---|---|---|---|---|---|---|---|---|
| 1. | Ledenite Dyavoli Sofia | 6 | 4 | 1 | 0 | 1 | 45:21 | 10 |
| 2. | Chervena Zvezda Sofia | 6 | 4 | 0 | 0 | 2 | 54:41 | 8 |
| 3. | Dinamo Sofia | 6 | 3 | 0 | 1 | 2 | 43:42 | 7 |
| 4. | Torpedo Sofia | 6 | 0 | 0 | 0 | 6 | 14:52 | 0 |
