= 1970–71 Bulgarian Hockey League season =

Bulgarian ice hockey season

The 1970–71 Bulgarian Hockey League season was the 19th season of the Bulgarian Hockey League, the top level of ice hockey in Bulgaria. Six teams participated in the league, and HK CSKA Sofia won the championship.

== Standings ==
	Club
1.	HK CSKA Sofia
2.	Levski-Spartak Sofia
3.	Krakra Pernik
4.	HK Slavia Sofia
5.	Akademik Sofia
6.	DZS Elin Pelin
