= 2006–07 Bulgarian Hockey League season =

Bulgarian ice hockey season

The 2006–07 Bulgarian Hockey League season was the 55th season of the Bulgarian Hockey League, the top level of ice hockey in Bulgaria. Three teams participated in the league, and Akademik Sofia won the championship.

== Standings ==
	Club	GP	W	T	L	Goals	Pts
1.	Akademik Sofia	14	12	0	2	70:29	24
2.	HK Levski Sofia	14	7	0	7	59:49	14
3.	HK Slavia Sofia	14	2	0	12	13:64	4
