= 1968–69 Bulgarian Hockey League season =

Bulgarian ice hockey season

The 1968–69 Bulgarian Hockey League season was the 17th season of the Bulgarian Hockey League, the top level of ice hockey in Bulgaria. Six teams participated in the league, and HK CSKA Sofia won the championship.

== Standings ==
	Club
1.	HK CSKA Sofia
2.	Krakra Pernik
3.	Akademik Sofia
4.	HK Slavia Sofia
5.	Levski-Spartak Sofia
6.	DZS Elin Pelin
