= Bulgarian Cup (ice hockey) =

The Bulgarian Cup (Bulgarian: Купа на България) is the national ice hockey cup competition in Bulgaria.

== Winners ==
(when available)

Season	Champion	Runner-up	3rd place
1954	HC Udarnik Sofia		
1956-57; Coupe du front pour la pattie	Cerveno Zname Sofia	HC Akademik Sofia	HK Torpedo Sofia
1963	HC Slavia Sofia		
1964	CDNA Sofia		
1965	HC CSKA Sofia		
1967	HC CSKA Sofia		
1968	HK Levski Sofia		
1970	HC Slavia Sofia		
1971-72	HC CSKA Sofia		
1972-73	HC CSKA Sofia		
1973-74	Spartak-Levski Sofia		
1974-75	HC CSKA Sofia		
1975-76	HC CSKA Sofia		
1976-77	Spartak-Levski Sofia	HC Slavia Sofia	HC CSKA Sofia
1977-78	HC CSKA Sofia		
1978-79	Spartak-Levski Sofia		
1979-80	Spartak-Levski Sofia	HC Slavia Sofia	HC Metallurg Pernik
1980-81	HC CSKA Sofia		
1981-82	Spartak-Levski Sofia	HC CSKA Sofia	HC Akademik Sofia
1982-83	HC CSKA Sofia	Spartak-Levski Sofia	HC Slavia Sofia
1983-84	Spartak-Levski Sofia		
1984-85	Spartak-Levski Sofia		
1985-86	HC CSKA Sofia		
1986-87	HC CSKA Sofia		
1987-88	Spartak-Levski Sofia	HC CSKA Sofia	HC Slavia Sofia
1988-89	Spartak-Levski Sofia		
1989-90	Spartak-Levski Sofia		
1990-91	HC Levski Sofia		
1991-92	HC Slavia Sofia	HC Levski Sofia	HC Metallurg Pernik
1992-93	HC Slavia Sofia	HC Levski Sofia	HC Metallurg Pernik
1993-94	HC Slavia Sofia	HC Levski Sofia	HC Metallurg Pernik
1994-95	HC Levski Sofia	HC Slavia Sofia	HC Metallurg Pernik
1995-96	HC Levski Sofia		
1998-99	HC Levski Sofia		
1999-2000	HC Levski Sofia	HC Slavia Sofia	HC Akademik Sofia
2000-01	HC Slavia Sofia		
2001-02	HC Slavia Sofia	HC Levski Sofia	Iceberg-Sulis Sofia
2002-03	HC Slavia Sofia	HC Levski Sofia	HC CSKA Sofia
2003-04	HC Slavia Sofia	HC Levski Sofia	HC CSKA Sofia
2004-05	HC Levski Sofia	HC Slavia Sofia	National U20 Team
2005-06	HC Akademik Sofia	HC Slavia Sofia	HC Levski Sofia
2006-07	HC Akademik Sofia	HC Slavia Sofia	HC Levski Sofia
2007-08	HC Slavia Sofia	HC CSKA Sofia	HC Levski Sofia
2008-09	HC Slavia Sofia	HC Levski Sofia	HC CSKA Sofia
2009-10	HC Slavia Sofia	HC CSKA Sofia	Iceberg-Sulis Sofia
2010-11	HC Slavia Sofia	HC CSKA Sofia	HC Levski Sofia
2012	HC CSKA Sofia	HC Slavia Sofia	HC Levski Sofia
2013	HC CSKA Sofia	HC Slavia Sofia	HC Akademik Sofia
2015	HC Irbis-Skate Sofia		
2016	HC Irbis-Skate Sofia	HC Slavia Sofia	HC CSKA Sofia
2017	HC Irbis-Skate Sofia	HC NSA Sofia	HC Slavia Sofia
2018	HC Irbis-Skate Sofia	HC NSA Sofia	HC Slavia Sofia
2019	HC Irbis-Skate Sofia	HC NSA Sofia	HC CSKA Sofia
2020	HC Irbis-Skate Sofia	HC NSA Sofia	HC CSKA Sofia
2021	HC NSA Sofia	HC Irbis-Skate Sofia	HC CSKA Sofia
2022	HC Irbis-Skate Sofia	HC NSA Sofia	HC CSKA Sofia
2023	HC Irbis-Skate Sofia	HC CSKA Sofia	HC NSA Sofia
2024	HC Irbis-Skate Sofia	HC NSA Sofia	HC CSKA Sofia
2025	HC CSKA Sofia	HC Irbis-Skate Sofia	HC NSA Sofia
2026	HC CSKA Sofia	HC Irbis-Skate Sofia	HC NSA Sofia
