= 1999–2000 Bulgarian Hockey League season =

Bulgarian ice hockey season

The 1999–2000 Bulgarian Hockey League season was the 48th season of the Bulgarian Hockey League, the top level of ice hockey in Bulgaria. Five teams participated in the league, and HK Slavia Sofia won the championship.

== Standings ==
	Club	GP	W	T	L	Goals	Pts
1.	HK Slavia Sofia	16	12	4	0	93:36	28
2.	HK Levski Sofia	16	12	2	2	129:30	26
3.	Akademik Sofia	16	8	2	6	103:78	18
4.	HK Metallurg Pernik	16	4	0	12	73:94	8
5.	HK CSKA Sofia	16	0	0	16	25:185	0
