= 2024–25 Bulgarian Hockey League season =

2024–25 Bulgarian Hockey League
- League: Bulgarian Hockey League
- Sport: Ice hockey
- Duration: 10 October 2024 – 4 March 2025
- Games: Regular season: 26; Postseason: 11
- Teams: 5

Regular season
- Best record: HC NSA Sofia
- Runners-up: Irbis-Skate Sofia

Playoffs
- Finals champions: HC NSA Sofia
- Runners-up: HC CSKA Sofia

Polska Hokej Liga seasons
- ← 2023–24 2025–26 →

The 2024–25 Bulgarian Hockey League season was the 73rd season of play for the Bulgarian Hockey League. The regular season ran from 10 October to 18 December 2024. HC NSA Sofia finished atop the standings. The postseason ran from 6 January to 4 March 2025. HC NSA Sofia defeated HC CSKA Sofia 2 games to 1 for the league championship.

== Teams ==
Note: All teams were based out of Sofia, the nation's capital. At least three (CSKA, Irbis and NSA) played their home game at the Winter Sports Palace Sofia

Team	Coach
HC CSKA Sofia	(Bulgaria) Kiril Hodulov
HC NSA Sofia	(Bulgaria) Stanislav Kanchev
HC Septemvri Sofia	?
HC Slavia Sofia	(Bulgaria) Martin Milanov
Irbis-Skate Sofia	(Bulgaria) Ivaylo Velev

== Regular season ==
=== Standings ===
Note: Septemvri played 2 games against each opponent. All other teams played 3 games against one another.

Pos	Team	Pld	W	OTW	OTL	L	GF	GA	GD	Pts	Qualification
1	HC NSA Sofia	11	9	0	0	2	98	41	+57	27	Qualification to Quarterfinals
2	Irbis-Skate Sofia	11	9	0	0	2	95	51	+44	27	Qualification to Quarterfinals
3	HC CSKA Sofia	11	6	0	0	5	84	41	+43	18	Qualification to Quarterfinals
4	HC Slavia Sofia	11	2	0	0	9	42	101	−59	6	Qualification to Quarterfinals
5	HC Septemvri Sofia	8	0	0	0	8	14	99	−85	0	

Updated to match(es) played on unknown. Source: Standings
Rules for classification: 1) Points; 2) Head-to-head points.

=== Results ===
Home \ Away	CSK	NSA	SEP	SLA	IRB	CSK	NSA	SEP	SLA	IRB	CSK	NSA	SEP	SLA	IRB
HC CSKA Sofia	—	5–4	23–0	11–0	1–10	—	2–3	10–0	10–2	6–8	—	1–5		13–2	2–7
HC NSA Sofia	4–5	—	14–0	15–1	8–6	3–2	—	16–4	12–5	5–11	5–1	—		8–1	8–5
HC Septemvri Sofia	0–23	0–14	—	3–6	2–15	0–10	4–16	—	3–8	2–7			—		
HC Slavia Sofia	0–11	1–15	6–3	—	8–14	2–10	5–12	8–3	—	4–6	2–13	1–8		—	5–6
Irbis-Skate Sofia	10–1	6–8	15–2	14–8	—	8–6	11–5	7–2	6–4	—	7–2	5–8		6–5	—

Updated to match(es) played on Final. Source: Results
Legend: Blue = home team win; Yellow = draw; Red = away team win.

=== Statistics ===
==== Scoring leaders ====
Player	Team	Pos	GP	G	A	Pts	PIM
(Bulgaria) Stanislav Muhachev	Irbis-Skate Sofia	F	10	9	34	43	4
(Bulgaria) Ivan Hodulov	HC CSKA Sofia	F	11	28	13	41	8
(Russia) Erik Blinov	HC NSA Sofia	F	9	19	14	33	2
(Bulgaria) Martin Nakov	Irbis-Skate Sofia	C	9	22	8	30	8
(Russia) Semen Kareev	HC NSA Sofia	F	8	20	10	30	2

== Playoffs ==
Semifinals (best-of-3)
1	HC NSA Sofia	9	15	-
4	HC Slavia Sofia	5	8	-
2	Irbis-Skate Sofia	7	4	2
3	HC CSKA Sofia	3	5	3**

Championship (best-of-3)
1	HC NSA Sofia	10	3	5*
3	HC CSKA Sofia	1	6	4
Third Place
2	Irbis-Skate Sofia	5	13	12
4	HC Slavia Sofia	6	2	4

Note: * denotes overtime
Note: ** denotes overtime and shootout
