= 1972–73 Bulgarian Hockey League season =

Bulgarian ice hockey season

The 1972–73 Bulgarian Hockey League season was the 21st season of the Bulgarian Hockey League, the top level of ice hockey in Bulgaria. Seven teams participated in the league, and HK CSKA Sofia won the championship, making it their 16th win at the time. HK CSKA Sofia also won the championship 2 seasons prior and would go on to win the next 2 seasons as well.

== Standings ==
	Club
1.	HK CSKA Sofia
2.	Akademik Sofia
3.	Levski-Spartak Sofia
4.	HK Slavia Sofia
5.	DFS Pernik
6.	Lokomotive Sofia
7.	DZS Elin Pelin
