= 1951–52 Bulgarian Hockey League season =

Bulgarian ice hockey season

The 1951–52 Bulgarian Hockey League season was the first season of the Bulgarian Hockey League, the top level of ice hockey in Bulgaria. Five teams participated in the league, and Cerveno Zname Sofia won the championship.

== Regular season ==
	Club
1.	Cerveno Zname Sofia
2.	HK Udarnik Sofia
3.	Akademik Sofia
4.	Narodna wojska Sofia
5.	Stroitel Sofia

== Final ==
- Cerveno Zname Sofia - Udarnik Sofia 1:0
