= 2014–15 Bulgarian Hockey League season =

63rd Season Of Bulgarian Hockey League

The 2014–15 Bulgarian Hockey League season was the 63rd season of the Bulgarian Hockey League, the top level of ice hockey in Bulgaria. Four teams participated in the league, and HC CSKA Sofia won the championship.

== Regular season ==
	Club	GP	W	T	L	Goals	Pts
1.	HC CSKA Sofia	6	6	0	0	49:12	18
2.	HC Slavia Sofia	6	4	0	2	34:19	12
3.	HC NSA Sofia	6	1	1	4	20:33	4
4.	HC Levski Sofia	6	0	1	5	12:48	1
