= 1994–95 Bulgarian Hockey League season =

Bulgarian ice hockey season

The 1994–95 Bulgarian Hockey League season was the 43rd season of the Bulgarian Hockey League, the top level of ice hockey in Bulgaria. Four teams participated in the league, and HK Levski Sofia won the championship.

== Standings ==
	Club	GP	W	T	L	Goals	Pts
1.	HK Levski Sofia	12	10	0	2	155:21	20
2.	HK Slavia Sofia	12	10	0	2	94:29	20
3.	Metallurg Pernik	12	4	0	8	42:89	8
4.	HK CSKA Sofia	12	0	0	12	35:187	0
