= Ice Devils Sofia =

Ledenite Dyavoli Sofia
- City: Sofia, Bulgaria
- Founded: 2007
- Home arena: Winter Sports Palace
- Colours: Yellow, blue

Ice Devils Sofia (Bulg. Хокеен Клуб "Ледени Дяволи" or Ledenite Dyavoli Sofia) is a Bulgarian ice hockey club, from Sofia. They played one season (2007–08) in the Bulgarian Hockey League. The club is playing in the second-highest ice hockey league of Bulgaria, the Balkan Amateur Hockey League (BaHL).

== History ==
The club was founded in 2007 and joined Group B of the Bulgarian Hockey League for the 2007-08 season. They finished with a record of four wins, one overtime win, and one loss, which was good enough for first place in their group. Ledenite participated in the Balkan League for the 2008-09 season, finishing in second place behind HC Etro 92 Veliko Tarnovo. In the 2009-10 season, they finished in second place in the regular season and lost in the playoff finals to Thessaloniki. The club finished first in the regular season in 2010-11, but were knocked out in the playoffs semifinals. During the 2011-12 season, Ledenite finished in fourth place in the regular season and lost in the third place game to Red Star Sofia. They finished in second place in Group A of the Balkan League in 2012-13.

== Results ==
The "Ice Devils" were able to win their first BaHL Championship in the season 2013-14.

Season	Result
2007/08	2nd BaHL 1st B group National Championship
2008/09	2nd BaHL
2009/10	2nd BaHL
2010/11	3rd BaHL
2011/12	4th BaHL (Group A); 4th BaHL (Group B)
2012/13	2nd BaHL (Group A); 2nd BaHL (Group B)
2013/14	1st BaHL (Group A); 1st BaHL (Group B)

== Team ==
Squad

Name	Nationality
Angelov, Plamen	(Bulgaria)
Avakyan, Aleksandar	(Bulgaria)
Dilov, Luben	(Bulgaria)
Dimitrov, Aleksandar	(Bulgaria)
Dimitrov, Borislav	(Bulgaria)
Eftimov, Gerasim	(Bulgaria)
Ganchev, Galin	(Bulgaria)
Gyazov, Kiril	(Bulgaria)
Hunzinger, Klaus	(Germany)
Iliev, Slav	(Bulgaria)
Ivanov, Georgi	(Bulgaria)
Klima, Martin	(Slovakia)
Kolarov, Sabin	(Bulgaria)
Konov, Dimitar	(Bulgaria)
Kresteva, Vesela	(Bulgaria)
Lisichkova, Tina	(Bulgaria)
Marinov, Dimitar	(Bulgaria)
Milanov, Aleksandar	(Bulgaria)
Nenov, Yuri	(Bulgaria)
Nikolov, Nikolai	(Bulgaria)
Pantaleev, Aleksandar	(Bulgaria)
Penev, Penio	(Bulgaria)
Peneva, Alisa	(Bulgaria)
Petsanov, Stefan	(Bulgaria)
Raschkov, Ivan	(Bulgaria)
Šprongl, Martin	(Czech Republic)
Stanchev, Josif	(Bulgaria)
Stoimenov, Svilen	(Bulgaria)
Stoimenova, Mariyana	(Bulgaria)
Stoyanov, Nikolai	(Bulgaria)
Stoyanov, Stoyan	(Bulgaria)
Stoyanov, Vladimir	(Bulgaria)
Valentovic, Peter	(Slovakia)
Virág, Csaba	(Slovakia)
Vladimirov, Vladimir	(Bulgaria)
Vlk, Jiri	(Czech Republic)
