= 2005–06 Bulgarian Hockey League season =

Bulgarian ice hockey season

The 2005–06 Bulgarian Hockey League season was the 54th season of the Bulgarian Hockey League, the top level of ice hockey in Bulgaria. Three teams participated in the league, and Akademik Sofia won the championship.

== Standings ==
	Club	GP	W	T	L	Goals	Pts
1.	Akademik Sofia	12	9	2	1	53:25	20
2.	HK Slavia Sofia	12	5	4	3	51:45	14
3.	HK Levski Sofia	12	0	2	10	29:63	2
