= 1997–98 Bulgarian Hockey League season =

Bulgarian ice hockey season

The 1997–98 Bulgarian Hockey League season was the 46th season of the Bulgarian Hockey League, the top level of ice hockey in Bulgaria. Four teams participated in the league, and HK Slavia Sofia won the championship.

== Standings ==
	Club	GP	W	T	L	Goals	Pts
1.	HK Slavia Sofia	12	11	1	0	88:28	23
2.	Akademik Sofia	12	6	1	5	63:46	13
3.	HK Levski Sofia	12	6	0	6	61:63	12
4.	HK Metallurg Pernik	12	0	0	12	45:130	0
