= 2018–19 Bulgarian Hockey League season =

Bulgarian ice hockey season

The 2018–19 Bulgarian Hockey League season was the 67th season of the Bulgarian Hockey League, the top level of ice hockey in Bulgaria. Four teams participated in the league, and Irbis-Skate Sofia won the championship.

== Regular season ==
	Club	GP	W	T	L	Goals	Pts
1.	Irbis-Skate Sofia	11	10	0	1	95:22	30
2.	HC NSA Sofia	12	7	1	4	50:51	23
3.	HC Slavia Sofia	11	5	1	5	36:57	16
4.	HC CSKA Sofia	12	0	0	12	31:82	0

Note: The February 26, 2019 game between Irbis-Skate Sofia and HC Slavia Sofia wasn't played.
