= 2001–02 Bulgarian Hockey League season =

Bulgarian ice hockey season

The 2001–02 Bulgarian Hockey League season was the 50th season of the Bulgarian Hockey League, the top level of ice hockey in Bulgaria. Five teams participated in the league, and HK Slavia Sofia won the championship.

== Regular season ==
	Club	GP	W	T	L	Goals	Pts
1.	HK Slavia Sofia	20	19	1	0	241:67	39
2.	HK Levski Sofia	20	14	1	5	169:53	29
3.	HK CSKA Sofia	20	8	2	10	108:102	18
4.	HK Metallurg Pernik	20	3	3	14	55:214	9
5.	Akademik Sofia	20	2	1	17	68:205	5

== Final ==
- HK Slavia Sofia - HK Levski Sofia 2:1 (0:5 Forfeit, 2:1, 5:4)
