= Spartak Sofia (ice hockey) =

- City: Sofia, Bulgaria
- Founded: 1956 (2007)
- Home arena: Winter Sports Palace
- Colours: Yellow, Black

Spartak Sofia is an ice hockey team in Sofia, Bulgaria. They were founded in 1956. The club merged with Levski Sofia in 1969, forming Levski-Spartak Sofia. Levski broke off in 1993, and Spartak was dissolved. In 2007, Spartak was revived, and played in the Bulgarian Hockey League during the 2007–08 and 2008–09 seasons.
