= 2003–04 Bulgarian Hockey League season =

Bulgarian ice hockey season

The 2003–04 Bulgarian Hockey League season was the 52nd season of the Bulgarian Hockey League, the top level of ice hockey in Bulgaria. Four teams participated in the league, and HK Slavia Sofia won the championship.

== Regular season ==
	Club	GP	W	T	L	Goals	Pts
1.	HK Slavia Sofia	6	5	1	0	85:22	11
2.	HK Levski Sofia	6	4	1	1	55:15	9
3.	Sinite Sofia	6	1	0	5	17:66	2
4.	Iceberg-Sulis Sofia	6	1	0	5	23:77	2

== Playoffs ==
=== Semifinals ===
- HK Slavia Sofia - Iceberg-Sulis Sofia 20:3/22:4
- HK Levski Sofia - Sinite Sofia 9:0/8:1

=== 3rd place ===
- Sinite Sofia - Iceberg-Sulis Sofia 4:3 (8:3, 2:5, 7:5, 1:6, 4:2, 3:7, 5:4)

=== Final ===
- HK Slavia Sofia - HK Levski Sofia 4:2 (6:2, 1:3, 4:2, 3:4 SO., 4:3 OT, 5:1)
