= Iceberg Sofia =

- City: Sofia, Bulgaria
- League: Bulgarian Hockey League
- Founded: 2001
- Home arena: Slavia Ice Stadium
- Colours: Red, Green

Iceberg Sofia is an ice hockey team in Sofia, Bulgaria.

== History ==
The club was founded in 2001. They made their first appearance in the Bulgarian Cup during the 2001-02 season, before joining the Bulgarian Hockey League for the 2002-03 season. They returned to the BHL as Iceberg-Sulis Sofia for the 2003-04 season. The club returned to action for the 2006-07 season, playing in the Bulgarian Amateur Hockey League. Iceberg participated in the Balkan League during the 2008-09 season, before joining the Bulgarian Hockey League for the 2009-10 season. Currently, Iceberg only consists of junior teams.
