= 2011–12 Bulgarian Hockey League season =

Bulgarian ice hockey season

The 2011–12 Bulgarian Hockey League season was the 60th season of the Bulgarian Hockey League, the top level of ice hockey in Bulgaria. Three teams participated in the league, and HK Slavia Sofia won the championship.

== Regular season ==
	Club	GP	W	T	L	Goals	Pts
1.	HK Slavia Sofia	8	8	0	0	57:13	24
2.	HK CSKA Sofia	8	4	0	4	33:41	12
3.	HK Levski Sofia	8	0	0	8	15:51	0
