= 2010–11 Bulgarian Hockey League season =

Bulgarian ice hockey season

The 2010–11 Bulgarian Hockey League season was the 59th season of the Bulgarian Hockey League, the top level of ice hockey in Bulgaria. Three teams participated in the league, and HK Slavia Sofia won the championship.

== Standings ==
	Club	GP	W	T	L	Goals	Pts
1.	HK Slavia Sofia	8	8	0	0	93:14	24
2.	HK CSKA Sofia	8	4	0	4	41:54	12
3.	HK Levski Sofia	8	0	0	8	18:84	0
