= 2012–13 Bulgarian Hockey League season =

Bulgarian ice hockey season

The 2012–13 Bulgarian Hockey League season was the 61st season of the Bulgarian Hockey League, the top level of ice hockey in Bulgaria. Four teams participated in the league, and HC CSKA Sofia won the championship, their first since 1986.

== Regular season ==
	Club	GP	W	T	L	Goals	Pts
1.	HC CSKA Sofia	10	10	0	0	133:28	30
2.	HC NSA Sofia	9	5	0	4	71:57	15
3.	HC Slavia Sofia	10	5	0	5	45:37	15
4.	HC Levski Sofia	11	0	0	11	16:143	0
