= 2004–05 Bulgarian Hockey League season =

Bulgarian ice hockey season

The 2004–05 Bulgarian Hockey League season was the 53rd season of the Bulgarian Hockey League, the top level of ice hockey in Bulgaria. Three teams participated in the league, and HK Slavia Sofia won the championship.

== Regular season ==
	Club	GP	W	T	L	Goals	Pts
1.	HK Slavia Sofia	6	5	1	0	52:10	11
2.	HK Levski Sofia	6	3	1	2	30:17	7
3.	HK CSKA Sofia	6	0	0	6	11:66	0

== Final ==
- HK Slavia Sofia - HK Levski Sofia 3:0 (4:2, 3:1, 10:1)
