= 2002–03 Bulgarian Hockey League season =

Bulgarian ice hockey season

The 2002–03 Bulgarian Hockey League season was the 51st season of the Bulgarian Hockey League, the top level of ice hockey in Bulgaria. Four teams participated in the league, and HK Levski Sofia won the championship.

== Regular season ==
| | Club | GP | W | T | L | Goals | Pts |
|---|---|---|---|---|---|---|---|
| 1. | HK Levski Sofia | 12 | 10 | 1 | 1 | 125:22 | 21 |
| 2. | HK Slavia Sofia | 12 | 9 | 1 | 2 | 100:28 | 19 |
| 3. | Iceberg Sofia | 12 | 2 | 1 | 9 | 40:145 | 5 |
| 4. | HK CSKA Sofia | 12 | 1 | 1 | 10 | 24:94 | 3 |

== Final ==
- HK Levski Sofia - HK Slavia Sofia 4:2/3:2
