= 2008–09 Bulgarian Hockey League season =

Bulgarian ice hockey season

The 2008–09 Bulgarian Hockey League season was the 57th season of the Bulgarian Hockey League, the top level of ice hockey in Bulgaria. Four teams participated in the league, and HK Slavia Sofia won the championship.

== Standings ==
	Club	GP	W	T	L	Goals	Pts
1.	HK Slavia Sofia	9	8	0	1	123:18	16
2.	HK CSKA Sofia	9	6	0	3	60:40	12
3.	HK Levski Sofia	9	4	0	5	38:81	8
4.	HK Spartak Sofia	9	0	0	9	23:105	0
