= Balkan League (disambiguation) =

The Balkan League was a military alliance against the Ottoman Empire.

The Balkan League may also refer to:

== Sport ==
- Balkan League (ice hockey), from 1994 to 1997
- Balkan Amateur Hockey League, since 2007
- Balkan International Basketball League

== See also ==
- Balkan Cup (disambiguation)
