= HC Etro 92 Veliko Tarnovo =

- City: Veliko Tarnovo, Bulgaria
- League: Bulgarian Hockey League
- Founded: 1992
- Home arena: Zimny stadion Veliko Tarnovo
- Colours: Purple, White

HC Etro 92 Veliko Tarnovo was an ice hockey team in Veliko Tarnovo, Bulgaria. The club was founded in 1992. They played in the Bulgarian Hockey League in the 1998–99 and 2000–01 seasons. The club later returned to play in the Balkan League in the 2008–09 through 2010–11 seasons.
