= Dinamo Sofia (ice hockey) =

- City: Sofia, Bulgaria
- Founded: 2006
- Home arena: Slavia Ice Stadium
- Colours: Black, Blue

Dinamo Sofia is an ice hockey team in Sofia, Bulgaria. The club was founded in 2006. They played in the Bulgarian Amateur League in the 2006–07 season, and then played in Group B of the Bulgarian Hockey League in the 2007–08 season. Since the 2008–09 season, they have played in the Balkan League, which contains teams from Greece and Bulgaria.
