= Georgi Milanov =

Georgi Milanov is the name of:

- Georgi Milanov (footballer) (born 1992), Bulgarian footballer
- Georgi Milanov (ice hockey) (1950s–2014), Bulgarian ice hockey player
