= BAHL =

BAHL may refer to:

- Bank Al Habib, a Pakistani bank run by Dawood Habib family group of companies
- Balkan Amateur Hockey League, a Bulgarian ice hockey league
