= 1984–85 IIHF European Cup =

European ice hockey tournament

The 1984–85 European Cup was the 20th edition of the European Cup, IIHF's premier European club ice hockey tournament. The season started on October 4, 1984, and finished on September 7, 1985.

The tournament was won by CSKA Moscow, who won the final group.

== First round ==
| Team #1 | Score | Team #2 |
|---|---|---|
| Vissers Nijmegen (Netherlands) | 19–0, 26–0 | Hiversport Luxembourg |
| CS Megève (France) | 10–1, 12–4 | (United Kingdom) Dundee Rockets |
| HC Davos (Switzerland) | 17–4, 7–1 | (Hungary) Ferencvárosi TC |
| HK Olimpija Ljubljana (Socialist Federal Republic of Yugoslavia) | 6–5, 4–5 (3–2 PS) | (Bulgaria) HK CSKA Sofia |
| CH Jaca (Spain) | 1–14, 4–7 | (Romania) HC Steaua București |

(Finland) Tappara, (Austria) VEU Feldkirch, (Italy) HC Bolzano, (Norway) Sparta Sarpsborg, (Poland) TMH Polonia Bytom : bye

== Second round ==
| Team #1 | Score | Team #2 |
|---|---|---|
| CS Megève (France) | 1–14, 5–15 | (Finland) Tappara |
| HC Davos (Switzerland) | 11–2, 6–6 | (Austria) VEU Feldkirch |
| HC Bolzano (Italy) | 11–5, 4–6 | (Norway) Sparta Sarpsborg |
| TMH Polonia Bytom (Poland) | 6–4, 6–3 | (Romania) HC Steaua București |
| Vissers Nijmegen (Netherlands) | 4–5, 4–3 (1–0 PS) | (Socialist Federal Republic of Yugoslavia) HK Olimpija Ljubljana |

(Sweden) AIK, (West Germany) Kölner EC, (East Germany) Dynamo Berlin, (Czechoslovakia) Dukla Jihlava, (Soviet Union) CSKA Moscow : bye

== Third round ==
| Team #1 | Score | Team #2 |
|---|---|---|
| CSKA Moscow (Soviet Union) | 10–1, 7–4 | (Switzerland) HC Davos |
| Tappara (Finland) | 6–9, 1–4 | (Czechoslovakia) Dukla Jihlava |
| Vissers Nijmegen (Netherlands) | 3–8, 2–10 | (Sweden) AIK |
| HC Bolzano (Italy) | 1–6, 3–9 | (West Germany) Kölner EC |
| TMH Polonia Bytom (Poland) | 3–1, 4–6 (3–1 PS) | (East Germany) Dynamo Berlin |

== Final Group ==
(Megève, France)

| Team #1 | Score | Team #2 |
|---|---|---|
| Dukla Jihlava (Czechoslovakia) | 5–3 | (West Germany) Kölner EC |
| AIK (Sweden) | 3–0 | (Poland) TMH Polonia Bytom |
| CSKA Moscow (Soviet Union) | 9–3 | (West Germany) Kölner EC |
| Dukla Jihlava (Czechoslovakia) | 10–0 | (Poland) TMH Polonia Bytom |
| CSKA Moscow (Soviet Union) | 11–0 | (Poland) TMH Polonia Bytom |
| AIK (Sweden) | 3–1 | (Czechoslovakia) Dukla Jihlava |
| CSKA Moscow (Soviet Union) | 5–1 | (Sweden) AIK |
| Kölner EC (West Germany) | 5–4 | (Poland) TMH Polonia Bytom |
| CSKA Moscow (Soviet Union) | 6–4 | (Czechoslovakia) Dukla Jihlava |
| Kölner EC (West Germany) | 6–3 | (Sweden) AIK |

=== Final group standings ===
| Rank | Team | Points |
| 1 | (Soviet Union) CSKA Moscow | 8 |
| 2 | (West Germany) Kölner EC | 4 |
| 3 | (Czechoslovakia) Dukla Jihlava | 4 |
| 4 | (Sweden) AIK | 4 |
| 5 | (Poland) TMH Polonia Bytom | 0 |
