= 1971–72 IIHF European Cup =

European ice hockey tournament

The 1971–72 European Cup was the seventh edition of the European Cup, IIHF's premier European club ice hockey tournament. The season started on August 30, 1971 and finished on December 15, 1972.

The tournament was won by CSKA Moscow, who beat Brynäs IF in the final

== First round ==
| Team #1 | Score | Team #2 |
|---|---|---|
| SG Dynamo Weißwasser (East Germany) | 9:0, 6:3 | (Bulgaria) HK CSKA Sofia |
| SG Cortina (Italy) | 1:3, 2:1 | (Switzerland) HC La Chaux-de-Fonds |
| HK Jesenice (Socialist Federal Republic of Yugoslavia) | 5:4, 4:3 | (Austria) EC KAC |
| Podhale Nowy Targ (Poland) | 5:3, 9:3 | (Norway) Vålerenga |
| Tilburg Trappers (Netherlands) | 4:6, 12:3 | (Hungary) Ferencvárosi TC |
| EV Füssen (West Germany) | w/o | (France) HC Chamonix |

(Sweden) Brynäs IF, (Finland) Ässät : bye

== Second round ==
| Team #1 | Score | Team #2 |
|---|---|---|
| Tilburg Trappers (Netherlands) | 2:5, 2:13 | (West Germany) EV Füssen |
| HC La Chaux-de-Fonds (Switzerland) | 1:3, 0:7 | (Sweden) Brynäs IF |
| SG Dynamo Weißwasser (East Germany) | 8:0, 9:5 | (Socialist Federal Republic of Yugoslavia) HK Jesenice |
| Podhale Nowy Targ (Poland) | w/o | (Finland) Ässät |

== Third round ==
| Team #1 | Score | Team #2 |
|---|---|---|
| Brynäs IF (Sweden) | 13:0, 5:0 | (West Germany) EV Füssen |
| SG Dynamo Weißwasser (East Germany) | 10:0, 9:3 | (Poland) Podhale Nowy Targ |

(Czechoslovakia) Dukla Jihlava, (Soviet Union) CSKA Moscow : bye

== Semifinals ==
| Team #1 | Score | Team #2 |
|---|---|---|
| Brynäs IF (Sweden) | 7:4, 6:2 | (Czechoslovakia) Dukla Jihlava |
| SG Dynamo Weißwasser (East Germany) | 1:11, 4:6 | (Soviet Union) CSKA Moscow |

== Finals ==
| Team #1 | Score | Team #2 |
|---|---|---|
| Brynäs IF (Sweden) | 2:8, Moscow. 5 december. 14 000. referee F. Baader. J. Kompala (West Germany) 3:8 (1:2, 2:2, 0:4) Lundstrom (19), Nilsson (29), Wickberg (39) - Petrov (3. 8. 32), Kuzkin (46), Trunov (46), Glayov (47), Mishakov (56). | (Soviet Union) CSKA Moscow Третьяк; Lutchenko-Blokhin, Kuzkin-Gusev, Tsygankov-Ragulin; Popov-Volchkov-Glazov, Mikhailov-Petrov-Blinov, Vikulov-Firsov-Kharlamov, Trunov, Mishakov |
