= 1986–87 IIHF European Cup =

European ice hockey tournament

The 1986–87 European Cup was the 22nd edition of the European Cup, IIHF's premier European club ice hockey tournament. The season started on October 2, 1986, and finished on September 27, 1987.

The tournament was won by CSKA Moscow, who won the final group.

== Preliminary round ==
Team #1	Score	Team #2
HC Steaua București (Romania)	14:0, 6:2	(Bulgaria) HK CSKA Sofia

== First round ==
Team #1	Score	Team #2
Stjernen (Norway)	14:3, 9:4	(United Kingdom) Durham Wasps
GIJS Groningen (Netherlands)	2:2, 3:6	(East Germany) Dynamo Berlin
HC Steaua București (Romania)	2:2, 4:5	(Socialist Federal Republic of Yugoslavia) HK Partizan
Mont-Blanc (France)	0:5*, 3:3	(Italy) HC Merano

* Official score, due to irregular registration of two Mont-Blanc players

(Finland) Tappara, (Switzerland) HC Lugano, (Austria) EC KAC, (Poland) TMH Polonia Bytom : bye

== Second round ==
Team #1	Score	Team #2
Stjernen (Norway)	0:10, 0:13	(Finland) Tappara
Dynamo Berlin (East Germany)	2:5, 1:1	(Switzerland) HC Lugano
HK Partizan (Socialist Federal Republic of Yugoslavia)	2:5, 1:9	(Poland) TMH Polonia Bytom
HC Merano (Italy)	9:11, 4:8	(Austria) EC KAC

(Sweden) Färjestads BK, (West Germany) Kölner EC, (Czechoslovakia) TJ VSŽ Košice, (Soviet Union) CSKA Moscow : bye

== Third round ==
Team #1	Score	Team #2
Tappara (Finland)	2:8, 5:7	(Soviet Union) CSKA Moscow
HC Lugano (Switzerland)	4:2, 4:5	(West Germany) Kölner EC
TMH Polonia Bytom (Poland)	1:4, 2:3	(Czechoslovakia) TJ VSŽ Košice
EC KAC (Austria)	6:5, 4:6	(Sweden) Färjestads BK

== Final Group ==
(Lugano, Ticino, Switzerland)

Team #1	Score	Team #2
CSKA Moscow (Soviet Union)	4:4	(Sweden) Färjestads BK
HC Lugano (Switzerland)	4:5	(Czechoslovakia) TJ VSŽ Košice
CSKA Moscow (Soviet Union)	9:0	(Czechoslovakia) TJ VSŽ Košice
HC Lugano (Switzerland)	3:7	(Sweden) Färjestads BK
HC Lugano (Switzerland)	2:10	(Soviet Union) CSKA Moscow
TJ VSŽ Košice (Czechoslovakia)	5:4	(Sweden) Färjestads BK

=== Final group standings ===
Rank	Team	Points
1	(Soviet Union) CSKA Moscow	5
2	(Czechoslovakia) TJ VSŽ Košice	4
3	(Sweden) Färjestads BK	3
4	(Switzerland) HC Lugano	0
