= 1969–70 IIHF European Cup =

European ice hockey tournament

The 1969–70 European Cup was the fifth edition of the European Cup, IIHF's premier European club ice hockey tournament. The season started on September 13, 1969 and finished on October 10, 1970.

The tournament was won by CSKA Moscow, who beat Spartak Moscow in the final

== First round ==
Team #1	Score	Team #2
HC Gherdëina (Italy)	4:6, 1:5	(Austria) EC KAC
Leksands IF (Sweden)	8:2, 1:7 (5:2 PS)	(Finland) HIFK
Esbjerg (Denmark)	1:6, 2:9	(West Germany) EV Füssen
SC Saint-Gervais (France)	0:6, 0:8	(Switzerland) HC La Chaux-de-Fonds
Újpesti Dózsa (Hungary)	4:5, 5:3	(Bulgaria) HK CSKA Sofia
Podhale Nowy Targ (Poland)	10:2, 2:4	(Socialist Federal Republic of Yugoslavia) HK Jesenice

(East Germany) SG Dynamo Weißwasser, (Czechoslovakia) Dukla Jihlava : bye

== Second round ==
Team #1	Score	Team #2
EC KAC (Austria)	8:3, 4:3	(Hungary) Újpesti Dózsa
EV Füssen (West Germany)	1:1, 1:2	(Switzerland) HC La Chaux-de-Fonds
Leksands IF (Sweden)	7:3, 5:4	(East Germany) SG Dynamo Weißwasser
Dukla Jihlava (Czechoslovakia)	11:1, 5:4	(Poland) Podhale Nowy Targ

== Third round ==
Team #1	Score	Team #2
EC KAC (Austria)	4:7, 2:8	(Czechoslovakia) Dukla Jihlava
HC La Chaux-de-Fonds (Switzerland)	1:8, 1:5	(Sweden) Leksands IF

(Soviet Union) Spartak Moscow, (Soviet Union) CSKA Moscow : bye

== Semifinals ==
Team #1	Score	Team #2
Leksands IF (Sweden)	2:6, 1:6	(Soviet Union) CSKA Moscow
Dukla Jihlava (Czechoslovakia)	3:4, 2:8	(Soviet Union) Spartak Moscow

== Finals ==
Team #1	Score	Team #2
Spartak Moscow (Soviet Union)	3:2, 5:8	(Soviet Union) CSKA Moscow
