= Ice hockey in Bulgaria =

- Country: Bulgaria
- Governing body: Bulgarian Ice Hockey Federation
- National team(s): Men's national team Women's national team

National competitions
- Bulgarian Hockey League

International competitions
- IIHF World Championships; Winter Olympics

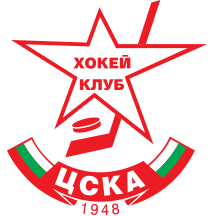
Logo of ice hockey club CSKA (Sofia)

Ice hockey in Bulgaria is governed by the Bulgarian Ice Hockey Federation. The Bulgarian Hockey League, the top level of Bulgarian hockey, was founded in 1952. Bulgarian men's, women's, and junior national teams participate at the World Championships. Bulgaria has been a member of the IIHF since July 25, 1960.
