= 1973–74 IIHF European Cup =

European ice hockey tournament

The 1973–74 European Cup was the ninth edition of the European Cup, IIHF's premier European club ice hockey tournament. The season started on October 13, 1973, and finished on September 2, 1975.

The tournament was won by CSKA Moscow, who beat Tesla Pardubice in the final.

== First round ==
Team #1	Score	Team #2
HC Bolzano (Italy)	4:6, 3:7	(Hungary) Ferencvárosi TC
EV Füssen (West Germany)	10:5, 9:5	(France) HC Chamonix
EC KAC (Austria)	12:1, 4:4	(Bulgaria) HK CSKA Sofia
Tilburg Trappers (Netherlands)	10:5, 11:6	(Belgium) Cercle des Patineurs Liégeois
HK Jesenice (Socialist Federal Republic of Yugoslavia)	4:8, 2:6	(Czechoslovakia) Tesla Pardubice
Vålerenga (Norway)	6:2, 5:1	(Denmark) Herning IK
Jokerit (Finland)	2:1, 3:1	(East Germany) SG Dynamo Weißwasser
Leksands IF (Sweden)	w/o	(Switzerland) HC La Chaux-de-Fonds

== Second round ==
Team #1	Score	Team #2
EV Füssen (West Germany)	7:8, 3:5	(Hungary) Ferencvárosi TC
EC KAC (Austria)	5:5, 3:8	(Netherlands) Tilburg Trappers
Vålerenga (Norway)	1:2, 1:11	(Czechoslovakia) Tesla Pardubice
Leksands IF (Sweden)	7:6, 4:3	(Finland) Jokerit

== Third round ==
Team #1	Score	Team #2
Tilburg Trappers (Netherlands)	11:2, 5:6	(Hungary) Ferencvárosi TC
Tesla Pardubice (Czechoslovakia)	4:2, 1:3 (3:1 PS)	(Sweden) Leksands IF

== Semifinals ==
Team #1	Score	Team #2
Tilburg Trappers (Netherlands)	1:7, 3:8	(Czechoslovakia) Tesla Pardubice

(Soviet Union) CSKA Moscow : bye

== Finals ==
Team #1	Score	Team #2
Tesla Pardubice (Czechoslovakia)	3:2, 1:6	(Soviet Union) CSKA Moscow
