= 1966–67 IIHF European Cup =

European ice hockey tournament

The 1966–67 European Cup was the second edition of the European Cup, IIHF's premier European club ice hockey tournament. The season started on November 17, 1966, and finished on April 4, 1967.

The tournament was won by ZKL Brno, who beat Ilves in the final.

== First round ==
Team #1	Score	Team #2
EC KAC (Austria)	5:4, 4:2, 1:3, 4:4	(West Germany) EC Bad Tölz
Vålerenga (Norway)	4:6, 8:6, 5:8, 6:7	(Finland) Ilves
Grasshoppers Zürich (Switzerland)	1:3, 3:5, 2:0, 2:3	(France) HC Chamonix
HK Jesenice (Socialist Federal Republic of Yugoslavia)	2:6, 2:4, 5:1, 0:5	(Italy) SG Cortina

(Hungary) Újpesti Dózsa, (Bulgaria) HK CSKA Sofia, (East Germany) Dynamo Berlin, (Poland) Podhale Nowy Targ: bye

== Second round ==
Team #1	Score	Team #2
EC KAC (Austria)	7:2, 5:3, 9:2, 3:3	(France) HC Chamonix
Dynamo Berlin (East Germany)	3:11, 4:4, 2:4, 1:7	(Finland) Ilves
Podhale Nowy Targ (Poland)	11:5, 8:5, 6:1, 8:3	(Bulgaria) HK CSKA Sofia
Újpesti Dózsa (Hungary)	1:6, 2:6, 2:6, 5:7	(Italy) SG Cortina

== Third round ==
Team #1	Score	Team #2
EC KAC (Austria)	4:2, 1:1, 4:4, 2:4 (3:1 PS)	(Italy) SG Cortina
Ilves (Finland)	8:3, 9:1, 4:1, 5:3	(Poland) Podhale Nowy Targ

(Czechoslovakia) ZKL Brno, (Soviet Union) CSKA Moscow: bye

== Semifinals ==
Team #1	Score	Team #2
EC KAC (Austria)	4:6, 4:4	(Czechoslovakia) ZKL Brno
Ilves (Finland)	w/o	(Soviet Union) CSKA Moscow

== Finals ==
Team #1	Score	Team #2
Ilves (Finland)	2:3, 4:5	(Czechoslovakia) ZKL Brno
