= 1972–73 IIHF European Cup =

European ice hockey tournament

The 1972–73 European Cup was the eighth edition of the European Cup, IIHF's premier European club ice hockey tournament. The season started in October 1972 and finished on August 20, 1974.

The tournament was won by CSKA Moscow, who beat Brynäs IF in the final

== First round ==
Team #1	Score	Team #2
EC KAC (Austria)	2–10, 3–9	(East Germany) SG Dynamo Weißwasser
Düsseldorfer EG (West Germany)	11–5, 5–3	(France) HC Chamonix
HDD Olimpija Ljubljana (Socialist Federal Republic of Yugoslavia)	2–2, 5–5 (3–1 PS)	(Bulgaria) HK CSKA Sofia
Tilburg Trappers (Netherlands)	5–1, 6–3	(Italy) SG Cortina
Hasle/Løren IL (Norway)	2–5, 3–6	(Poland) Podhale Nowy Targ
Ferencvárosi TC (Hungary)	w/o	(Switzerland) HC La Chaux-de-Fonds

(Czechoslovakia) Dukla Jihlava, (Finland) Ilves : bye

== Second round ==
Team #1	Score	Team #2
Tilburg Trappers (Netherlands)	3–7, 1–8	(West Germany) Düsseldorfer EG
Podhale Nowy Targ (Poland)	4–3, 0–9	(East Germany) SG Dynamo Weißwasser
HDD Olimpija Ljubljana (Socialist Federal Republic of Yugoslavia)	3–0, 5–6	(Hungary) Ferencvárosi TC
Dukla Jihlava (Czechoslovakia)	w/o	(Finland) Ilves

== Third round ==
Team #1	Score	Team #2
SG Dynamo Weißwasser (East Germany)	4–2, 1–3 (0–1 PS)	(Czechoslovakia) Dukla Jihlava
Düsseldorfer EG (West Germany)	5–3, 3–2	(Socialist Federal Republic of Yugoslavia) HDD Olimpija Ljubljana

(Sweden) Brynäs IF, (Soviet Union) CSKA Moscow : bye

== Semifinals ==
Team #1	Score	Team #2
Brynäs IF (Sweden)	7–3, 2–2	(West Germany) Düsseldorfer EG
CSKA Moscow (Soviet Union)	6–0, 3–1	(Czechoslovakia) Dukla Jihlava

== Final ==
Team #1	Score	Team #2
Brynäs IF (Sweden)	2–6, 2–12	(Soviet Union) CSKA Moscow
