= 1974–75 IIHF European Cup =

European ice hockey tournament

The 1974–75 European Cup was the tenth edition of the European Cup, IIHF's premier European club ice hockey tournament. The season started on September 1, 1974, and finished on February 19, 1977.

The tournament was won by Krylya Sovetov Moscow, who beat Dukla Jihlava in the final

== First round ==
The first round was played September 1 – December 14, 1974.

Team #1	Score	Team #2
SG Cortina (Italy)	2:5, 3:4	(Austria) EC KAC
SC Saint-Gervais (France)	0:7, 2:6	(Hungary) Ferencvárosi TC
HK Olimpija Ljubljana (Socialist Federal Republic of Yugoslavia)	6:2, 4:1	(Bulgaria) HK CSKA Sofia
SG Dynamo Weißwasser (East Germany)	14:2, 3:2	(Netherlands) Tilburg Trappers
Berliner SC (West Germany)	7:5, 6:3	(Norway) Hasle/Løren IL
HIFK (Finland)	8:7, 6:7 (3:1 PS)	(Poland) Podhale Nowy Targ

(Switzerland) SC Bern, (Sweden) Leksands IF : bye

== Second round ==
The second round was played December 22, 1974 – February 6, 1975.

Team #1	Score	Team #2
EC KAC (Austria)	8:6, 5:5	(Hungary) Ferencvárosi TC
HK Olimpija Ljubljana (Socialist Federal Republic of Yugoslavia)	4:6, 2:8	(East Germany) SG Dynamo Weißwasser
Berliner SC (West Germany)	3:4, 5:3	(Switzerland) SC Bern
HIFK (Finland)	w/o	(Sweden) Leksands IF

== Third round ==
The third round was played in February 1975.

Team #1	Score	Team #2
EC KAC (Austria)	1:8, 3:7	(East Germany) SG Dynamo Weißwasser
Berliner SC (West Germany)	1:3, 2:4	(Finland) HIFK

(Czechoslovakia) Dukla Jihlava, (Soviet Union) Krylya Sovetov Moscow : bye

== Semifinals ==
The semifinals were played September 1, 1975 – March 19, 1976.

Team #1	Score	Team #2
Krylya Sovetov Moscow (Soviet Union)	4:1, 4:3	(East Germany) SG Dynamo Weißwasser
HIFK (Finland)	2:7, 4:10	(Czechoslovakia) Dukla Jihlava

== Finals ==
The finals were played February 17–19, 1977.

Team #1	Score	Team #2
Dukla Jihlava (Czechoslovakia)	17. 02. 1977; 3:2 (1:0, 2:1, 0:1), 19. 02. 1977 0:7 (0:2, 0:1, 0:4)	(Soviet Union) Krylya Sovetov Moscow
