= 1975–76 IIHF European Cup =

European ice hockey tournament

The 1975–76 European Cup was the 11th edition of the European Cup, IIHF's premier European club ice hockey tournament. The season started on November 13, 1975, and finished on December 9, 1977.

The tournament was won by CSKA Moscow, who beat Poldi Kladno in the final

== First round ==
| Team #1 | Score | Team #2 |
|---|---|---|
| SC Bern (Switzerland) | 5:2, 6:5 | (Hungary) Ferencvárosi TC |
| SG Cortina (Italy) | 3:1, 1:12 | (West Germany) Düsseldorfer EG |
| Tilburg Trappers (Netherlands) | 4:3, 1:5 | (Socialist Federal Republic of Yugoslavia) HK Olimpija Ljubljana |
| ATSE Graz (Austria) | w/o | (France) SC Saint-Gervais |
| HK CSKA Sofia (Bulgaria) | 0:8, 1:11 | (East Germany) SG Dynamo Weißwasser |
| Gladsaxe SF (Denmark) | 2:7, 0:12 | (Norway) IF Frisk |

(Finland) Tappara, (Sweden) Brynäs IF : bye

== Second round ==
| Team #1 | Score | Team #2 |
|---|---|---|
| SC Bern (Switzerland) | 4:1, 8:3 | (Austria) ATSE Graz |
| IF Frisk (Norway) | 3:6, 1:14 | (East Germany) SG Dynamo Weißwasser |
| Düsseldorfer EG (West Germany) | w/o | (Socialist Federal Republic of Yugoslavia) HK Olimpija Ljubljana |
| Tappara (Finland) | w/o | (Sweden) Brynäs IF |

== Third round ==
| Team #1 | Score | Team #2 |
|---|---|---|
| SC Bern (Switzerland) | 6:3, 1:8 | (West Germany) Düsseldorfer EG |
| SG Dynamo Weißwasser (East Germany) | 2:3, 0:3 | (Finland) Tappara |

(Czechoslovakia) Poldi Kladno, (Soviet Union) CSKA Moscow : bye

== Semifinals ==
| Team #1 | Score | Team #2 |
|---|---|---|
| Düsseldorfer EG (West Germany) | 5:8, 3:4 | (Czechoslovakia) Poldi Kladno |
| Tappara (Finland) | 2:1, 4:5 (2:4 PS) | (Soviet Union) CSKA Moscow |

== Finals ==
| Team #1 | Score | Team #2 |
|---|---|---|
| Poldi Kladno (Czechoslovakia) | 0:6, 2:4 | (Soviet Union) CSKA Moscow |
