= 1967–68 IIHF European Cup =

European ice hockey tournament

The 1967–68 European Cup was the third edition of the European Cup, IIHF's premier European club ice hockey tournament. The season started on October 13, 1967, and finished on April 6, 1968.

The tournament was won by ZKL Brno, who beat Dukla Jihlava in the final

== First round ==
Team #1	Score	Team #2
Ässät (Finland)	6:3, 6:2	(Poland) HK Legia Warszawa
Gladsaxe SF (Denmark)	1:12, 1:15	(Norway) Vålerenga
Düsseldorfer EG (West Germany)	8:2, 8:3	(France) HC Chamonix
HK CSKA Sofia (Bulgaria)	3:5, 3:8	(Socialist Federal Republic of Yugoslavia) HK Jesenice
EC KAC (Austria)	6:2, 4:3	(Hungary) Ferencvárosi TC
EC Kloten (Switzerland)	w/o	(Italy) SG Cortina

(East Germany) Dynamo Berlin, (Sweden) Brynäs IF : bye

== Second round ==
Team #1	Score	Team #2
Ässät (Finland)	7:2, 8:3	(Norway) Vålerenga
Düsseldorfer EG (West Germany)	4:4, 3:7	(Socialist Federal Republic of Yugoslavia) HK Jesenice
Brynäs IF (Sweden)	4:3, 3:4 (0:2 PS)	(East Germany) Dynamo Berlin
EC Kloten (Switzerland)	4:6, 0:5	(Austria) EC KAC

== Third round ==
Team #1	Score	Team #2
Dynamo Berlin (East Germany)	5:0, 3:6	(Finland) Ässät
HK Jesenice (Socialist Federal Republic of Yugoslavia)	1:3, 5:6	(Austria) EC KAC

(Czechoslovakia) ZKL Brno, (Czechoslovakia) Dukla Jihlava : bye

== Semifinals ==
Team #1	Score	Team #2
EC KAC (Austria)	5:6, 5:5	(Czechoslovakia) ZKL Brno
Dukla Jihlava (Czechoslovakia)	5:1, 5:4	(East Germany) Dynamo Berlin

== Finals ==
Team #1	Score	Team #2
ZKL Brno (Czechoslovakia)	3:0, 3:3	(Czechoslovakia) Dukla Jihlava
