= Georgi Milanov (ice hockey) =

Bulgarian ice hockey player and coach

- Born: September 8, 1952; Sofia, Bulgaria
- Died: November 2, 2014 (aged 62); Bulgaria
- Position: Goaltender
- Caught: Left
- Played for: HC Slavia Sofia
- National team: Bulgaria
- Playing career: c. 1976–c. 1985

Georgi Milanov (Bulgarian: Георги Миланов) (8 September 1952 – 2 November 2014) was a Bulgarian ice hockey player and coach who played for Slavia Sofia and the national team. He also coached the national team on multiple occasions. In helped Slavia Sofia win the Bulgarian championship in the 1984–85 season, winning the best goaltender award in the process. He began coaching in 1987, leading Slavia to another title in his first season. This started a period of Slavia winning 17 championships over the next 25 years, with Milanov as coach. He had a son, Martin, who also played hockey and would coach the Bulgarian junior teams.
