= Kiril Vajarov =

Bulgarian ice hockey player

- Born: 18 February 1988 Sofia, Bulgaria
- Died: 18 April 2009 (aged 21) Sofia, Bulgaria
- Height: 5 ft 10 in (178 cm)
- Weight: 171 lb (78 kg; 12 st 3 lb)
- Position: Goaltender
- Caught: Left
- Played for: HC Slavia Sofia
- National team: Bulgaria
- Playing career: 2004–2009

Kiril Vajarov (Bulgarian: Кирил Въжаров, 18 February 1988 – 18 April 2009) was a Bulgarian ice hockey goaltender, who played for HC Slavia Sofia.

== Career ==
Vajarov was a three time Bulgarian champion with HC Slavia Sofia.

== International career ==
Vajarov was a member of the Bulgaria men's national ice hockey team. He played three games in the tournament. He was also a member of the country's U18 and U20 teams.

== Death ==
He was stabbed to death on 18 April 2009 as he was visiting a nightclub in Sofia, Bulgaria. The 21-year-old was celebrating the birthday of a friend, who was also killed in the incident.

== See also ==
- List of ice hockey players who died during their playing career
