= Chervena Zvezda Sofia =

- City: Sofia, Bulgaria
- Founded: 2002
- Home arena: Winter Sports Palace
- Colours: Red, white

Chervena Zvezda Sofia (Bulgarian: Спортен Клуб Червена звезда – София) (also known as Red Star Sofia) is an ice hockey team in Sofia, Bulgaria. They played only in the 2007-08 and 2019-20 seasons of the Bulgarian Hockey League.

== History ==
The club was founded in 2002. They participated in Group B of the Bulgarian Hockey League for the 2007-08 and 2019-20. In 2007-08, they finished in second place with a record of four wins and two losses.

Chervena Zvezda Sofia now consists only of junior teams.
