= Balkan Amateur Hockey League =

Ice hockey league in Bulgaria

- Sport: Ice hockey
- Founded: 2007; 19 years ago
- CEO: Martin Milanov
- No. of teams: 10
- Country: Bulgaria (8 teams); Greece (1 team); North Macedonia (1 team)
- Most recent champion: Dynamo Sofia
- Most titles: HC NSA Sofia (2)

The Balkan Hockey League (Bulgarian: Балканска Хокейна Лига), called the BaHL (Bulgarian: БаХЛ), is the second highest-level ice hockey league in Bulgaria.

== History ==
The league was founded by Bulgarian ice hockey player Martin Milanov, who would become its president.

In addition to Bulgarian teams, the BaHL has teams had from Serbia, Greece, and North Macedonia.

== Teams ==
Team	City/Area	Arena	Capacity	Founded	Joined BaHL
Teams (Group A)
Ice Devils	(Bulgaria) Sofia	Slavia Ice Stadium	1,874	2007	2007–08
Dynamo Sofia	(Bulgaria) Sofia	Slavia Ice Stadium	1,874	2007	2007–08
Dnepr Sofia	(Bulgaria) Sofia	Slavia Ice Stadium	1,874	2012	2012–13
Chervena Zvezda Sofia	(Bulgaria) Sofia	Winter Sports Palace	3,200	2002	2013–14 (rejoined)
AllStars	(Greece) Thessaloniki	Slavia Ice Stadium	1,874	2013	2013–14
Metalurg Skopje	(North Macedonia) Skopje	Skopje Ice Rink	2,000	2013	2013–14
Teams (Group B)
Ice Devils (B)	(Bulgaria) Sofia	Slavia Ice Stadium	1,874	2007	2011–12
Torpedo Sofia	(Bulgaria) Sofia	Slavia Ice Stadium	1,874	2007	2007–08
Admiral Sofia	(Bulgaria) Sofia	Slavia Ice Stadium	1,874	2013	2013–14
Ice Sparks	(Bulgaria) Sofia	Slavia Ice Stadium	1,874	2013	2013–14

Stadiums for the teams participating in the Balkan Amateur Hockey League

== BaHL playoffs ==
There are playoffs after the regular seasons. Almost all BaHL have been won by Bulgarian teams. The only cases in which the championship was won by other teams, they were from Greece.

=== BaHL Champions ===
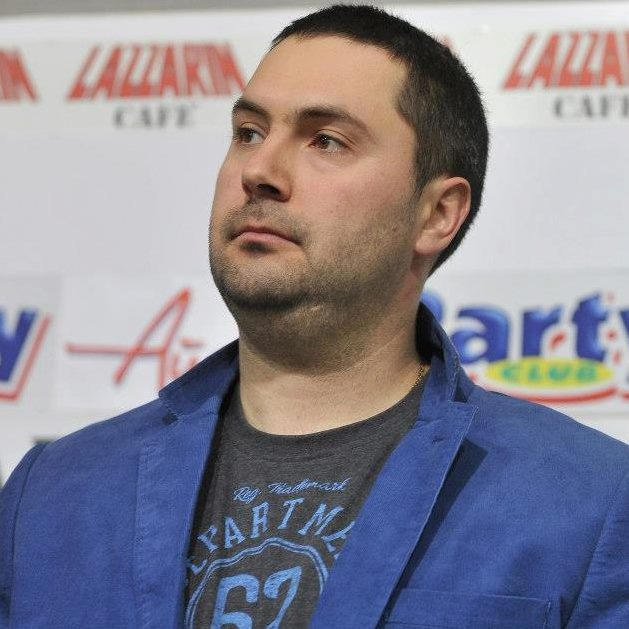
Martin Milanov, chairman of the league, since its creation.

- 2007 P.A.O.K.
- 2008 Slavia Sofia
- 2009 Aris Thessaloniki
- 2010 Etro Veliko Tarnovo
- 2011 NSA Sofia
- 2012 NSA Sofia
- 2013 Dynamo Sofia

Club	Winners	Winning years
NSA Sofia	2	2011, **2012**
P.A.O.K.	1	**2007**
Slavia Sofia	1	**2008**
Aris Thessaloniki	1	**2009**
Etro Veliko Tarnovo	1	2010
Dynamo Sofia	1	**2013**

Bold denotes seasons in which the BaHL had teams outside Bulgaria.

== See also ==
- Bulgaria men's national ice hockey team
- Bulgarian Hockey League
- Ice hockey in Bulgaria
