= Torpedo Sofia =

- City: Sofia, Bulgaria
- Founded: 2006
- Home arena: Winter Stadium Slavia
- Colours: Red, blue

Torpedo Sofia is an ice hockey team in Sofia, Bulgaria. They played one season (2007–08) in the Bulgarian Hockey League.

== History ==
The club was founded in 2006 and took part in the Bulgarian Amateur League during the 2006–07 season. For the 2007-08 season, the club joined the Bulgarian Hockey League, participating in Group B. They finished last in the group after failing to win a game. Torpedo joined the Balkan League, which also consisted of teams from Greece, for the 2008–09 season. They finished in last place with a record of one win, 10 losses, and one tie. They returned to the Balkan League for the 2009–10 season, but again finished in last place, this time failing to record a victory. After sitting out the 2011 and 2012 seasons, Torpedo returned to the Balkan League for the 2012–13 season. They finished in first place in Group B of the league.
