= HC CSKA Sofia =

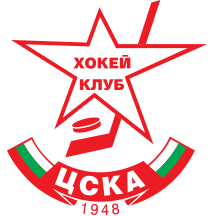
- Nickname: Армейците (The Army Men); Червените (The Reds)
- City: Sofia, Bulgaria
- League: Bulgarian Hockey League
- Founded: 5 May 1948
- Home arena: Sofia Winter Sports Palace (capacity: 2,500)
- Colours: Red, White
- President: Ivelin Todorov
- Website: www.hockeycska.com

HC CSKA Sofia is a professional ice hockey team from Sofia, Bulgaria that currently plays in the Bulgarian Hockey League. They are a department of the United Sports Clubs of CSKA Sofia.

== History ==
Ice hockey develops in Bulgaria in the start of the 20th century, but the organized hockey becomes famous in the end of the 40s. In 1994 a tournament in honor of the 5th congress of "Bulgarian Communist Party" is held and a few teams participate in it. On 16 September in the same year, the "Republican section for skates and ice hockey" is created. At the start, the competitions are in the form of city championships, without age requirements. One of the first teams is CSKA's one.

During 1952 the first republican championship is held, where CSKA doesn't reach top 3. In the next competition, CSKA becomes third and wins its first medals. Then a few competitions that are played at the capital's racecourse, in which CSKA participates under the name "CDNA" and wins silver four times and bronze two times.

The golden period for CSKA is in the 60s, when CDNA unites with the hockey hegemon in those times – "Red flag" and under the name of CSKA "Red flag" four consecutive titles are won in the period 1963–67. After the second place in 1968, the golden rhythm is regained and CSKA is a champion in 1969 once again. Until 1975, five new titles are won, and the hegemony in CSKA is stopped only for one season by the team from Pernik – "Krakra".

CSKA won the title in 1983 once again and doubled it during the next season. In 1986 the "army" players win their third title for the decade, which turns out to be their last for the next 27 years.

After the changes in 1989, ice hockey degrades in Bulgaria as a whole, and CSKA suffers the most out of those changes. Separate competitions are held where only up to 3 teams participate. On a certain championship the title was to be given to one of the two teams that participated, which was very curious. However, CSKA manages to keep ice hockey alive throughout all of those years, and in the last few years a new powerful period is established when the hockey club is taken over by the coach and president Kiril Hodulov.

There is a future for ice hockey for CSKA, especially because the team is full of young players. One of them is Nikolai Bozhanov. Bozhanov has gone through all of the formations of the "army" team and is also thankful to the coach – Kiril Hodulov, who helps him. Niki is a fan of CSKA and visits the games of CSKA when he has the opportunity to, no matter what the sport is.

From 2012 CSKA not only wins three consecutive titles, but also returns with a bang on the European hockey scene. The club participates in the prestige tournament for the "Continental cup", where in two consecutive seasons the club manages to go through the first phase.

Unfortunately, in 2015 however, due to the lack of enough financial support, CSKA is forced to give up its participation in the second group stage of the "Continental cup", even though the club won in a dominant fashion in Belgrade.

== Achievements ==
- Bulgarian Champion (17): 1964, 1965, 1966, 1967, 1969, 1971, 1972, 1973, 1974, 1975, 1983, 1984, 1986, 2013, 2014, 2015, 2026
- Bulgarian Runner-up (17): 1955, 1960, 1961, 1962, 1963, 1968, 1970, 1978, 1987, 1988, 1989, 2008, 2009, 2010, 2011, 2012, 2025
- Bulgarian Cup (16): 1964, 1965, 1967, 1972, 1973, 1975, 1976, 1978, 1981, 1983, 1986, 1987, 2012, 2013, 2025, 2026

== Season by season ==
| Season | Division | Pos | Cup | European competitions |
|---|---|---|---|---|
| 1951-52 | Bulgarian League | 4th | - | - |
| 1952-53 | Bulgarian League | 3rd | - | - |
| 1953-54 | Bulgarian League | 3rd | - | - |
| 1954-55 | Bulgarian League | 2nd | - | - |
| 1955-56 | Bulgarian League | 5th | - | - |
| 1956-57 | - | | 4th | - |
| 1957-58 | Bulgarian League | 3rd | - | - |
| 1958-59 | Bulgarian League | 3rd | - | - |
| 1959-60 | Bulgarian League | 2nd | - | - |
| 1960-61 | Bulgarian League | 2nd | - | - |
| 1961-62 | Bulgarian League | 2nd | - | - |
| 1962-63 | Bulgarian League | 2nd | - | - |
| 1963-64 | Bulgarian League | 1st | W | - |
| 1964-65 | Bulgarian League | 1st | W | - |
| 1965-66 | Bulgarian League | 1st | - | European Cup - First round |
| 1966-67 | Bulgarian League | 1st | W | European Cup - Second round |
| 1967-68 | Bulgarian League | 2nd | - | European Cup - First round |
| 1968-69 | Bulgarian League | 1st | - | - |
| 1969-70 | Bulgarian League | 2nd | - | European Cup - First round |
| 1970-71 | Bulgarian League | 1st | - | - |
| 1971-72 | Bulgarian League | 1st | W | European Cup - First round |
| 1972-73 | Bulgarian League | 1st | W | European Cup - First round |
| 1973-74 | Bulgarian League | 1st | 2nd | European Cup - First round |
| 1974-75 | Bulgarian League | 1st | W | European Cup - First round |
| 1975-76 | Bulgarian League | 3rd | W | European Cup - First round |
| 1976-77 | Bulgarian League | 3rd | 3rd | - |
| 1977-78 | Bulgarian League | 2nd | W | - |
| 1978-79 | Bulgarian League | 4th | - | - |
| 1979-80 | Bulgarian League | 5th | 4th | - |
| 1980-81 | Bulgarian League | 3rd | W | - |
| 1981-82 | Bulgarian League | 3rd | RU | - |
| 1982-83 | Bulgarian League | 1st | W | - |
| 1983-84 | Bulgarian League | 1st | - | - |
| 1984-85 | Bulgarian League | 3rd | - | European Cup - First round |
| 1985-86 | Bulgarian League | 1st | W | - |
| 1986-87 | Bulgarian League | 2nd | W | European Cup - Preliminary round |
| 1987-88 | Bulgarian League | 2nd | 2nd | - |
| 1988-89 | Bulgarian League | 2nd | - | - |
| 1989-90 | Bulgarian League | 3rd | - | - |
| 1990-91 | Bulgarian League | 3rd | - | - |
| 1991-92 | Bulgarian League | 4th | 4th | - |
| 1992-93 | Bulgarian League | 4th | 5th | - |
| 1993-94 | Bulgarian League | 4th | - | - |
| 1994-95 | Bulgarian League | 4th | 4th | - |
| 1995-96 | Bulgarian League | 5th | - | - |
| 1996-97 | Bulgarian League | 5th | - | - |
| 1999-00 | Bulgarian League | 5th | - | - |
| 2000-01 | Bulgarian League | 6th | - | - |
| 2001-02 | Bulgarian League | 3rd | - | - |
| 2002-03 | Bulgarian League | 4th | 3rd | - |
| 2003-04 | Bulgarian League | Disqualified | 3rd | - |
| 2004-05 | Bulgarian League | 3rd | - | - |
| 2007-08 | Bulgarian League | 2nd | 2nd | - |
| 2008-09 | Bulgarian League | 2nd | 3rd | - |
| 2009-10 | Bulgarian League | 2nd | 2nd | - |
| 2010-11 | Bulgarian League | 2nd | 2nd | - |
| 2011-12 | Bulgarian League | 2nd | - | - |
| 2012-13 | Bulgarian League | 1st | W | - |
| 2013-14 | Bulgarian League | 1st | W | Continental Cup - First Stage |
| 2014-15 | Bulgarian League | 1st | - | Continental Cup - Second Stage |
| 2015-16 | Bulgarian League | 3rd | - | Continental Cup - First round(*W) |
| 2016-17 | Bulgarian League | 4th | 3rd | - |
| 2017-18 | Bulgarian League | 4th | 4th | - |
| 2018-19 | Bulgarian League | 4th | 4th | - |
| 2019-20 | Bulgarian League | 4th | 3rd | - |
| 2020-21 | Bulgarian League | 3rd | 3rd | - |
| 2021-22 | Bulgarian League | 3rd | 3rd | - |
| 2022-23 | Bulgarian League | 3rd | 3rd | - |
| 2023-24 | Bulgarian League | 3rd | 2nd | - |
| 2024-25 | Bulgarian League | 2nd | 3rd | - |
| 2025-26 | Bulgarian League | 1st | W | - |
| 2026-27 | Bulgarian League | | W | - |

== HC CSKA Sofia in European Hockey ==
IIHF European Cup
| Season | Round | Club | Score |
|---|---|---|---|
| 1965–66 | First round | (Hungary) Újpesti Dózsa | 3-8, 0-8, 4-6, 4-8 |
| 1966–67 | Second round | (Poland) Podhale Nowy Targ | 5-11, 5-8, 1-6, 3-8 |
| 1967–68 | First round | (Socialist Federal Republic of Yugoslavia) HK Jesenice | 3-5, 3-8 |
| 1969–70 | First round | (Hungary) Újpesti Dózsa | 5-4, 3-5 |
| 1971–72 | First round | (East Germany) SG Dynamo Weißwasser | 0-9, 3-6 |
| 1972–73 | First round | (Socialist Federal Republic of Yugoslavia) HK Olimpija Ljubljana | 2–2, 5–5 (1–3 PS) |
| 1973–74 | First round | (Austria) EC KAC | 1-12, 4-4 |
| 1974–75 | First round | (Socialist Federal Republic of Yugoslavia) HK Olimpija Ljubljana | 2-6, 1-4 |
| 1975–76 | First round | (East Germany) SG Dynamo Weißwasser | 0-8, 1-11 |
| 1984–85 | First round | (Socialist Federal Republic of Yugoslavia) HK Olimpija Ljubljana | 5–6, 5–4 (2–3 PS) |
| 1986–87 | Preliminary round | (Romania) HC Steaua București | 0-14, 2-6 |

IIHF Continental Cup
| Season | Round | Club | Score | Aggregate |
|---|---|---|---|---|
| 2013–14 | First Group Stage (Belgrade, Serbia) | (Spain) CD Hielo Bipolo | 4-1 | 3rd place |
| 2013–14 | First Group Stage (Belgrade, Serbia) | (Serbia) HK Partizan | 3-5 | 3rd place |
| 2013–14 | First Group Stage (Belgrade, Serbia) | (Estonia) Tallinn Viiking-Sport | 3-5 | 3rd place |
| 2014–15 | First Group Stage (Sofia, Bulgaria) | (Spain) Puigcerdà | 3-2 | 1st place |
| 2014–15 | First Group Stage (Sofia, Bulgaria) | (Turkey) Izmir BB GSK | 19-3 | 1st place |
| 2014–15 | First Group Stage (Sofia, Bulgaria) | (Serbia) Beostar | 10-2 | 1st place |
| 2014–15 | Second Group Stage (Bremerhaven, Germany) | (Germany) Fischtown Pinguins | 2-6 | 4th place |
| 2014–15 | Second Group Stage (Bremerhaven, Germany) | (United Kingdom) Belfast Giants | 2-6 | 4th place |
| 2014–15 | Second Group Stage (Bremerhaven, Germany) | (Netherlands) Tilburg Trappers | 4-5 | 4th place |
| 2015-16* | First round (Belgrade, Serbia) | (Serbia) Partizan Belgrade | 12-4 | 1st place |
| 2015-16* | First round (Belgrade, Serbia) | (Israel) Rishon Devils | 7-1 | 1st place |
| 2015-16* | First round (Belgrade, Serbia) | (Turkey) Zeytinburnu Belediyespor | 9-5 | 1st place |

(*)CSKA Sofia, the winners of First round renounced its participation due to financial problems and were replaced by First round third-placed team Partizan Belgrade after First round runners-up Zeytinburnu Belediyespor declined the invitation.

== Notable players ==
- Konstantin Mihailov
