= Winter Sports Palace =

Ice hockey arena in Sofia, Bulgaria

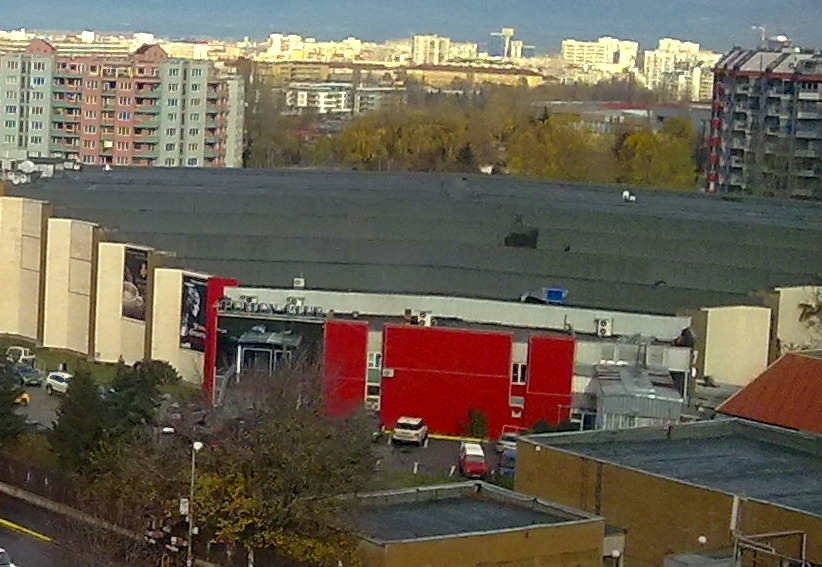
- The Winter Sports Palace in 2009
- Interactive map of Winter Sports Palace
- Coordinates: 42.6440578°N 23.3430878°E
- Capacity: 4,600
- Surface: ice

Construction
- Opened: 1982

Tenants
- HC CSKA Sofia; HC Levski Sofia; Ice Devils Sofia; Irbis-Skate Sofia; HC NSA Sofia

The Winter Sports Palace is an ice hockey arena in Sofia, Bulgaria. Opened in 1982, it has a capacity of 4,600 spectators. It will host the 2026 Men's Ice Hockey World Championships - Division 2, Group B.

== See also ==
- List of indoor arenas in Bulgaria
