= Irbis-Skate Sofia =

Bulgarian ice hockey team

- City: Sofia, Bulgaria
- League: Bulgarian Hockey League
- Founded: 2012
- Home arena: Winter Sports Palace
- Colours: Blue, black, white
- Head coach: Stanislav Mukhachev
- Website: www.irbis-skate.com

Franchise history
- 2012–present: Irbis-Skate Sofia

Championships
- Bulgarian Hockey League: 8
- Bulgarian Cup: 9

Irbis-Skate Sofia (Bulgarian: Спортен клуб ИРБИС-СКЕЙТ) is a Bulgarian professional ice hockey team based in Sofia, that competes in the Bulgarian Hockey League. Irbis-Skate Sofia was founded in 2012 and joined the Bulgarian Hockey League for the 2015–16 season. The club won the 2015–16 season and the 2016 Bulgarian Cup and as a result qualified for the 2016–17 IIHF Continental Cup.

== History ==
Irbis-Skate Sofia was founded in August 2012 and initially competed in small tournaments and exhibition matches against Bulgarian Hockey League teams. The club also formed minor ice hockey teams to compete in competitions before entering their under-12 team into the national championship for the 2013–14 season. In 2015 Irbis-Skate Sofia entered the Bulgarian Hockey League for the 2015–16 season with their home arena being the Winter Sports Palace. The club finished the first round of the 2015–16 season in first place and as a result won the 2016 Bulgarian Cup. Irbis-Skate Sofia then went on to win all their remaining games of the season and finished in first place to claim their first Bulgarian Hockey League title. As a result of winning the 2015–16 season Irbis-Skate Sofia qualified for the 2016–17 IIHF Continental Cup where they entered in the first round. The club was selected as host of the Group A tournament and was drawn against HC Bat Yam, Partizan Belgrade and Zeytinburnu Belediyespor.
