= HC NSA Sofia =

- City: Sofia, Bulgaria
- Founded: 2009
- Home arena: Winter Sports Palace
- Colours: White, blue, black, gold
- Website: hockeyclubnsa.com

HC NSA Sofia is a professional ice hockey team in Sofia, Bulgaria. They currently play in the Bulgarian Hockey League.

== History ==
The club was founded in 2009 as part of the National Sports Academy of Bulgaria. They played in the Balkan League during the 2010-11 and 2011-12 seasons, winning the championship both seasons. NSA joined the Bulgarian Hockey League for the 2012-13 season, finishing in second place behind CSKA Sofia.

== Achievements ==
- Bulgarian Champion (1): 2022
