= Bulgarian Hockey League =

Sports league

Bulgarian Hockey League Българска Хокейна Лига
- Current season, competition or edition: 2025–26 Bulgarian Hockey League season
- Sport: Ice hockey
- Founded: 1949
- First season: 1952
- No. of teams: 5
- Country: Bulgaria
- Most recent champions: HC CSKA Sofia (25th title)
- Most titles: HC CSKA Sofia (25 titles)
- Website: BHL

The Bulgarian Hockey League is the highest level ice hockey league in Bulgaria.

== Teams ==
As of 2021, the Bulgarian Hockey League consists of the following teams:

- CSKA Sofia
- Irbis-Skate Sofia
- HC NSA Sofia
- HC Slavia Sofia
- HC Levski Sofia

=== Former teams ===
- Cerveno Zname Sofia
- Metallurg Pernik
- Torpedo Sofia
- Akademika Sofia
- Red Star Sofia
- Levski Elin Pelin
- Etar Veliko Tarnovo

== Bulgarian League champions ==
- 1952 Cerveno Zname Sofia
- 1953 HK Udarnik Sofia
- 1954 HK Udarnik Sofia
- 1955 Torpedo Sofia
- 1956 Cerveno Zname Sofia
- 1957 Cerveno Zname Sofia
- 1958 Not Played
- 1959 Cerveno Zname Sofia
- 1960 Cerveno Zname Sofia
- 1961 Cerveno Zname Sofia
- 1962 Cerveno Zname Sofia
- 1963 Cerveno Zname Sofia
- 1964 CDNA Sofia
- 1965 HC CSKA Sofia
- 1966 HC CSKA Sofia
- 1967 HC CSKA Sofia
- 1968 Metallurg Pernik
- 1969 HC CSKA Sofia
- 1970 HK Krakra Pernik
- 1971 HC CSKA Sofia
- 1972 HC CSKA Sofia
- 1973 HC CSKA Sofia
- 1974 HC CSKA Sofia
- 1975 HC CSKA Sofia
- 1976 Levski-Spartak Sofia
- 1977 Levski-Spartak Sofia
- 1978 Levski-Spartak Sofia
- 1979 Levski-Spartak Sofia
- 1980 Levski-Spartak Sofia
- 1981 Levski-Spartak Sofia
- 1982 Levski-Spartak Sofia
- 1983 HC CSKA Sofia

- 1984 HC CSKA Sofia
- 1985 HC Slavia Sofia
- 1986 HC CSKA Sofia
- 1987 HC Slavia Sofia
- 1988 HC Slavia Sofia
- 1989 Levski-Spartak Sofia
- 1990 Levski-Spartak Sofia
- 1991 HC Slavia Sofia
- 1992 Levski-Spartak Sofia
- 1993 HC Slavia Sofia
- 1994 HC Slavia Sofia
- 1995 HC Levski Sofia
- 1996 HC Slavia Sofia
- 1997 HC Slavia Sofia
- 1998 HC Slavia Sofia
- 1999 HC Levski Sofia
- 2000 HC Slavia Sofia
- 2001 HC Slavia Sofia
- 2002 HC Slavia Sofia
- 2003 HC Levski Sofia
- 2004 HC Slavia Sofia
- 2005 HC Slavia Sofia
- 2006 Akademika Sofia
- 2007 Akademika Sofia
- 2008 HC Slavia Sofia
- 2009 HC Slavia Sofia
- 2010 HC Slavia Sofia
- 2011 HC Slavia Sofia
- 2012 HC Slavia Sofia
- 2013 HC CSKA Sofia
- 2014 HC CSKA Sofia
- 2015 HC CSKA Sofia

- 2016 Irbis-Skate Sofia
- 2017 Irbis-Skate Sofia
- 2018 Irbis-Skate Sofia
- 2019 Irbis-Skate Sofia
- 2020 Irbis-Skate Sofia
- 2021 Irbis-Skate Sofia
- 2022 HC NSA Sofia
- 2023 Irbis-Skate Sofia
- 2024 Irbis-Skate Sofia
- 2025 HC NSA Sofia
- 2026 CSKA Sofia

== Titles by team ==
Titles	Team	Year
24	CSKA Sofia; CDNA Sofia; Cerveno Zname Sofia	1952, 1956, 1957, 1959, 1960, 1961, 1962, 1963, 1964, 1965, 1966, 1967, 1969, 1971, 1972, 1973, 1974, 1975, 1983, 1984, 1986, 2013, 2014, 2015
21	Slavia Sofia; HK Udarnik Sofia (1951-1957)	1953, 1954, 1985, 1987, 1988, 1991, 1993, 1994, 1996, 1997, 1998, 2000, 2001, 2002, 2004, 2005, 2008, 2009, 2010, 2011, 2012
13	HC Levski Sofia; Levski-Spartak Sofia (1969-1990)	1976, 1977, 1978, 1979, 1980, 1981, 1982, 1989, 1990, 1992, 1995, 1999, 2003
8	Irbis-Skate Sofia	2016, 2017, 2018, 2019, 2020, 2021, 2023, 2024
2	Akademika Sofia	2006, 2007
2	Metallurg Pernik; HK Krakra Pernik	1968, 1970
1	Torpedo Sofia	1955
1	NSA Sofia	2022
