= Cerveno Zname Sofia =

- City: Sofia, Bulgaria
- League: Bulgarian Hockey League
- Founded: 1949
- Colours: Red, white

Franchise history
- 1949-1963: Cerveno Zname Sofia
- After 1963: CSKA Sofia

DSO Cerveno Zname Sofia (Bulgarian: Доброволна спортна организация Червено знаме, short: ДСО Червено знаме) was an ice hockey team in Sofia, Bulgaria.

== History ==
The club was founded in 1949 as a merger between Sredets Sofia (founded in 1942) and Sportist Sofia (founded in 1939). They won nine Bulgarian Hockey League titles between 1949 and 1963.

In 1963, Cerveno Zname Sofia merged with CSKA Sofia. The merged club was known as CSKA Cerveno Zname Sofia for a few years afterwards.

== Achievements ==
- Bulgarian Hockey League champion (9): 1951, 1952, 1956, 1958, 1959, 1960, 1961, 1962, 1963.
- Bulgarian Hockey League runner-up (2): 1953, 1954.
