= Metallurg Pernik =

- City: Pernik, Bulgaria
- League: Bulgarian Hockey League
- Founded: 1957
- Folded: 2002
- Home arena: Zimny stadion Metallurg
- Colours: Red, white, blue

Franchise history
- 1957-1958: Metallurg Pernik
- 1958-1960: Lenin Pernik
- 1960-1969: Metallurg Pernik
- 1969-1973: Krakra Pernik
- 1973-1998: Metallurg Pernik
- 1998-1999: Akademik-Metallurg Sofia
- 1999-2002: HK Metallurg Pernik

HK Metallurg Pernik (Bulgarian: ХК Металург Перник) was an ice hockey team based in Pernik, Bulgaria.

== History ==
The club was founded in 1957 as Metallurg Pernik and was renamed Lenin Pernik a year later. In 1960, they returned to their original name. They won their first Bulgarian Hockey League title in 1968.

In 1969, the club merged with Krakra Pernik, and were Bulgarian champions again in 1970. They were known as DFS Pernik during the 1972-73 season.

Metallurg split from the merger with Krakra in 1973 and participated in the Bulgarian Hockey League under the Metallurg name until they merged with Akademik Sofia in 1998. This merger lasted one season before Metallurg became independent again. They continued to participate in the BHL until folding in 2002.

== Achievements ==
- Bulgarian Hockey League champion (2): 1968, 1970.
- Bulgarian Hockey League runner-up (6): 1959, 1964, 1965, 1966, 1979, 1997.
