= Akademika Sofia =

- City: Sofia, Bulgaria
- Founded: 1949
- Home arena: Winter Sports Palace

Franchise history
- 1949-1993: Akademik Sofia
- 1993-1995: CSKA Akademik Sofia
- 1995-1998: Akademik Sofia
- 1998-1999: Akademik-Metallurg Sofia
- 1999-2001: Akademik Sofia
- 2001-2008: Akademika Sofia

Akademika Sofia was an ice hockey team in Sofia, Bulgaria. They folded in 2008.

== History ==
The club was founded in 1949 as part of the Akademik Sofia sports club and existed until 1993 when they merged with CSKA Sofia. In 1995 the club was founded again and merged with Metallurg Pernik to form Akademik-Metallurg Sofia in 1998. They became independent again as Akademik Sofia in 1999. In 2001, they took on the name of Akademika Sofia. Akademika was Bulgarian champions in 2006 and 2007, and won the Bulgarian Cup in 1955, 1998, 2006, and 2007.

== Achievements ==
Bulgarian champion

- 2006, 2007

Bulgarian runner-up

- 1956, 1958, 1973, 1998

Bulgarian Cup winner

- 1955, 1998, 2006, 2007
