= HC Levski Sofia =

Levski Sofia
- City: Sofia
- Founded: 1953
- Home arena: Sofia Winter Sports Palace
- Colours: Blue, Gold

Franchise history
- 1953–1959: HK Dinamo Sofia
- 1959–1969: HK Levski Sofia
- 1969–1990: Levski-Spartak Sofia
- 1990–present: HK Levski Sofia

HC Levski Sofia is a professional ice hockey team in Sofia, Bulgaria. They are part of the Levski Sofia sports club, and have played in the Bulgarian Hockey League since 1953.

== History ==
The club was founded as HK Dinamo Sofia in 1953. After six years they became HK Levski Sofia, before merging with Spartak Sofia in 1969 to form Levski-Spartak Sofia. They won seven titles as Levski-Spartak from 1976 to 1982. In 1990, they took on their present name, HK Levski Sofia, and won four titles in the 1990s. The club is one of the most successful Bulgarian hockey teams, with 13 titles, and has won a record 17 Bulgarian Cup titles.

== Achievements ==
- Bulgarian Champion (13): 1976, 1977, 1978, 1979, 1980, 1981, 1982, 1989, 1990, 1992, 1995, 1999, 2003
- Bulgarian Runner-up (20): 1967, 1971, 1972, 1974, 1975, 1983, 1984, 1985, 1986, 1991, 1993, 1994, 1996, 2000, 2001, 2002, 2004, 2005, 2007, 2011
- Bulgarian Cup (17): 1968, 1974, 1977, 1979, 1980, 1982, 1984, 1985, 1988, 1989, 1990, 1991, 1995, 1996, 1999, 2000, 2005

== Notable players ==
- Konstantin Mihailov (1984 to 2004)
