= HC Slavia Sofia =

- City: Sofia, Bulgaria
- League: Bulgarian Hockey League
- Founded: 1919
- Home arena: Slavia Ice Stadium
- Colours: Black, white

Franchise history
- 1919–1949: NFD Slavia Sofia
- 1949–1951: DSO Stroitel Sofia
- 1951–1957: HK Udarnik Sofia
- 1957–present: Slavia Sofia

HC Slavia Sofia (Bulgarian: Славия София), Slaviya Sofiya) is a professional ice hockey team from the Bulgarian Hockey League based in Sofia, Bulgaria. The team has won 19 league titles, and are a member of the Slavia Sofia sports club.

== History ==
The team was founded in 1919 under the name of NFD Slavia Sofia. They competed as DSO Stroitel Sofia from 1948 to 1951, and six years as Udarnik Sofia, before changing their name to Slavia Sofia in 1957. The team has won nineteen Bulgarian championships, making them the most successful team in the country. They have also finished as runners-up eleven times, and won the Bulgarian Cup twelve times. The club has participated in the IIHF Continental Cup several times, and have never made it past the second round.

== Notable players ==
- Konstantin Mihailov
- Georgi Milanov
- Kiril Vajarov
