= 2019 IIHF World Championship Division I =

International ice hockey tournament

Tournament details
- Host countries: Kazakhstan; Estonia
- Venues: 2 (in 2 host cities)
- Dates: 29 April–5 May; 28 April–4 May
- Teams: 12

The 2019 IIHF World Championship Division I was an international ice hockey tournament run by the International Ice Hockey Federation.

The Group A tournament was held in Nur-Sultan, Kazakhstan from 29 April to 5 May 2019 and the Group B tournament in Tallinn, Estonia from 28 April to 4 May 2019.

Belarus and Kazakhstan gained promotion to the top division, while Romania was promoted to Group A next year. Lithuania and the Netherlands were relegated to Group B and Division II by finishing last in their tournaments.

== Group A tournament ==
2019 IIHF World Championship Division I A

Tournament details
- Host country: Kazakhstan
- Venue: 1 (in 1 host city)
- Dates: 29 April–5 May
- Teams: 6

Tournament statistics
- Games played: 15
- Goals scored: 81 (5.4 per game)
- Attendance: 41,554 (2,770 per game)
- Scoring leader: (Slovenia) Jan Drozg (7 points)

Official website
- Website

=== Participants ===
Team	Qualification
Belarus	Placed 15th in the Elite Division in 2018 and was relegated.
South Korea	Placed 16th in the Elite Division in 2018 and was relegated.
Kazakhstan	Host, placed 3rd in Division I A in 2018.
Hungary	Placed 4th in Division I A in 2018.
Slovenia	Placed 5th in Division I A in 2018.
Lithuania	Placed 1st in Division I B in 2018 and was promoted.

=== Match officials ===
7 referees and 7 linesmen were selected for the tournament.

Referees	Linesmen
(Canada) Alexandre Garon; (Czech Republic) Robin Šír; (Finland) Kristian Vikman; (Norway) Roy Stian Hansen; (Russia) Yuri Oskirko; (Switzerland) Marc Alain Wiegand; (Sweden) Christoffer Holm	(Belgium) Frederic Monnaie; (Finland) Markus Hägerström; (France) Nicolas Constantineau; (South Korea) Park Jun-soo; (Norway) Alexander Waldejer; (Slovakia) Roman Výleta; (Sweden) Tobias Nordlander

=== Standings ===
Pos	Team	Pld	W	OTW	OTL	L	GF	GA	GD	Pts	Qualification or relegation
1	Kazakhstan (H, P)	5	4	1	0	0	16	7	+9	14	2020 IIHF World Championship
2	Belarus (P)	5	3	0	1	1	14	12	+2	10	2020 IIHF World Championship
3	South Korea	5	3	0	0	2	16	11	+5	9	
4	Slovenia	5	2	0	0	3	21	12	+9	6	
5	Hungary	5	1	0	0	4	7	18	−11	3 (Note: Lithuania 1–4 Hungary)	
6	Lithuania (R)	5	1	0	0	4	7	21	−14	3	Relegation to 2020 Division I B

Source: IIHF
Rules for classification: 1) points; 2) head-to-head points; 3) head-to-head goal difference; 4) head-to-head number of goals scored; 5) result against closest best-ranked team outside tied teams; 6) result against second-best ranked team outside tied teams; 7) seeding before tournament.
(H) Host; (P) Promoted; (R) Relegated

=== Results ===
All times are local (UTC+6).

29 April 2019; 12:30	Hungary	1–5 (1–1, 0–2, 0–2)	South Korea	Barys Arena, Nur-Sultan; Attendance: 922

Game reference

Bence Bálizs
Goalies
Matt Dalton
Referees:
(Canada) Alexandre Garon
(Norway) Roy Stian Hansen
Linesmen:
(France) Nicolas Constantineau
(Finland) Markus Hägerström

	0–1	15:01 – Shin Sang-h.
Hári (Galló, Stipsicz) – 15:46	1–1
	1–2	21:42 – Ahn (Kim S., Kim K.)
	1–3	28:06 – Kim S. (Jeon, Ahn) (PP)
	1–4	48:48 – Kim K. (Kim S., Ahn)
	1–5	49:29 – Kim S. (Ahn)

20 min
Penalties
8 min
37
Shots
28

29 April 2019; 16:00	Lithuania	3–4 (2–3, 0–0, 1–1)	Belarus	Barys Arena, Nur-Sultan; Attendance: 625

Game reference

Mantas Armalis
Goalies
Dmitri Milchakov
Referees:
(Sweden) Christoffer Holm
(Russia) Yuri Oskirko
Linesmen:
(Belgium) Frederic Monnaie
(Sweden) Tobias Nordlander

Bogdziul (SH) – 02:52	1–0
Zubrus (Krakauskas, Bogdziul) – 08:23	2–0
	2–1	08:51 – Lopachuk
	2–2	15:52 – S. Malyavko (A. Malyavko)
	2–3	16:35 – Platt (Kovyrshin)
	2–4	43:00 – Feoktistov (Lisovets, Bailen)
Gintautas (Četvertak, Čižas) – 52:34	3–4

4 min
Penalties
2 min
13
Shots
39

29 April 2019; 19:30	Slovenia	2–3 (0–3, 2–0, 0–0)	Kazakhstan	Barys Arena, Nur-Sultan; Attendance: 7,923

Game reference

Matija Pintarič
Goalies
Henrik Karlsson
Referees:
(Czech Republic) Robin Šír
(Finland) Kristian Vikman
Linesmen:
(Slovakia) Roman Výleta
(Norway) Alexander Waldejer

	0–1	03:54 – Mikhailis (Dietz, St. Pierre) (PP)
	0–2	09:45 – Nekryach
	0–3	15:09 – Mikhailis (Boyd, Dietz) (PP)
Kuralt (Ograjenšek) – 38:03	1–3
Rodman (Kopitar, Podlipnik) (PP) – 38:24	2–3

10 min
Penalties
4 min
23
Shots
34

30 April 2019; 16:00	South Korea	5–3 (1–3, 3–0, 1–0)	Slovenia	Barys Arena, Nur-Sultan; Attendance: 780

Game reference

Matt Dalton
Goalies
Matija Pintarič
Referees:
(Sweden) Christoffer Holm
(Switzerland) Marc Alain Wiegand
Linesmen:
(Belgium) Frederic Monnaie
(Sweden) Tobias Nordlander

Kim K. (Kim S.) – 04:35	1–0
	1–1	08:32 – Podlipnik (Kopitar) (PP)
	1–2	12:05 – Ograjenšek (Gregorc, Magovac) (PP)
	1–3	16:03 – Sabolič (Rodman, Kopitar)
Kim Won-jun (Park J., Jeon) – 27:40	2–3
Kim S. (Kim K.) (PP) – 29:32	3–3
Kim Hyun-s. (Lee Yo., Kim Won-jung) – 30:08	4–3
Shin Sang-h. (Plante) (EN) – 59:22	5–3

12 min
Penalties
4 min
24
Shots
44

30 April 2019; 19:30	Belarus	3–1 (1–0, 1–0, 1–1)	Hungary	Barys Arena, Nur-Sultan; Attendance: 648

Game reference

Dmitri Milchakov
Goalies
Ádám Vay
Referees:
(Czech Republic) Robin Šír
(Finland) Kristian Vikman
Linesmen:
(South Korea) Park Jun-soo
(Slovakia) Roman Výleta

Feoktistov (Kitarov, Bokun) – 04:32	1–0
Lisovets (Platt, Kovyrshin) – 29:49	2–0
Platt (Bailen, Demkov) (PP2) – 45:29	3–0
	3–1	54:31 – Galló (Vas, Stipsicz) (PP)

8 min
Penalties
4 min
29
Shots
30

1 May 2019; 16:30	Kazakhstan	3–1 (1–0, 1–0, 1–1)	Lithuania	Barys Arena, Nur-Sultan; Attendance: 7,265

Game reference

Henrik Karlsson
Goalies
Mantas Armalis
Referees:
(Canada) Alexandre Garon
(Switzerland) Marc Alain Wiegand
Linesmen:
(Finland) Markus Hägerström
(Norway) Alexander Waldejer

Boyd (Bochenski, Sagadeyev) (PP) – 10:13	1–0
Kleshchenko (Sagadeyev, Bochenski) – 31:21	2–0
	2–1	41:25 – Domeika (Četvertak, Čižas)
Dietz (Metalnikov, Karlsson) (PP) – 59:21	3–1

0 min
Penalties
6 min
40
Shots
13

2 May 2019; 12:30	Lithuania	1–4 (1–2, 0–2, 0–0)	Hungary	Barys Arena, Nur-Sultan; Attendance: 513

Game reference

Mantas Armalis
Goalies
Ádám Vay
Referees:
(Norway) Roy Stian Hansen
(Sweden) Christoffer Holm
Linesmen:
(Belgium) Frederic Monnaie
(Sweden) Tobias Nordlander

	0–1	08:42 – Bartalis (Nagy, Stipsicz)
	0–2	15:26 – Bartalis (Szirányi, Wehrs)
Kumeliauskas (Bosas) (PP) – 18:59	1–2
	1–3	26:14 – Erdély (Vas, Hári) (PP)
	1–4	36:04 – Sofron (Bartalis)

4 min
Penalties
31 min
24
Shots
41

2 May 2019; 16:00	Belarus	4–1 (1–0, 0–0, 3–1)	Slovenia	Barys Arena, Nur-Sultan; Attendance: 555

Game reference

Dmitri Milchakov
Goalies
Luka Gračnar
Referees:
(Canada) Alexandre Garon
(Switzerland) Marc Alain Wiegand
Linesmen:
(Finland) Markus Hägerström
(South Korea) Park Jun-soo

Sharangovich (Lisovets, Kisly) (PP) – 03:24	1–0
	1–1	43:30 – Sabolič (Rodman)
Yevenko (Platt, Kovyrshin) – 45:42	2–1
Platt (Demkov, Kovyrshin) – 49:12	3–1
Demkov (EN) – 58:49	4–1

12 min
Penalties
6 min
31
Shots
21

2 May 2019; 19:30	South Korea	1–4 (0–2, 0–1, 1–1)	Kazakhstan	Barys Arena, Nur-Sultan; Attendance: 5,766

Game reference

Matt Dalton
Goalies
Henrik Karlsson
Referees:
(Russia) Yuri Oskirko
(Finland) Kristian Vikman
Linesmen:
(France) Nicolas Constantineau
(Slovakia) Roman Výleta

	0–1	03:57 – Akolzin (Maklyukov, Metalnikov)
	0–2	16:46 – Metalnikov (Mikhailis, Bochenski)
	0–3	29:45 – Shevchenko (Zhailauov, Dietz)
Shin Sang-w. (Kim Hyun-s., Cho) – 50:13	1–3
	1–4	52:30 – Kleshenko (Mikhailis, St. Pierre)

4 min
Penalties
6 min
18
Shots
39

3 May 2019; 19:30	Hungary	0–6 (0–1, 0–3, 0–2)	Slovenia	Barys Arena, Nur-Sultan; Attendance: 1,012

Game reference

Ádám Vay
Bence Bálizs
Goalies
Luka Gračnar
Referees:
(Norway) Roy Stian Hansen
(Russia) Yuri Oskirko
Linesmen:
(France) Nicolas Constantineau
(South Korea) Park Jun-soo

0–1	13:57 – Štebih (Drozg, Goličič)
0–2	20:59 – Drozg (Sabolič, Kopitar) (PP)
0–3	23:16 – Drozg (Zajc, Goličič)
0–4	30:22 – Kuralt (Magovac)
0–5	54:11 – Kopitar (Rodman)
0–6	58:33 – Hebar (Pance) (SH)

6 min
Penalties
6 min
25
Shots
34

4 May 2019; 14:00	South Korea	1–2 (0–1, 0–0, 1–1)	Lithuania	Barys Arena, Nur-Sultan; Attendance: 321

Game reference

Matt Dalton
Goalies
Mantas Armalis
Referees:
(Sweden) Christoffer Holm
(Finland) Kristian Vikman
Linesmen:
(Slovakia) Roman Výleta
(Norway) Alexander Waldejer

	0–1	13:16 – Kumeliauskas (Ališauskas, Bosas) (PP)
Kim S. (Kim K., Lee D.) – 42:26	1–1
	1–2	49:32 – Gintautas (Katulis)

4 min
Penalties
4 min
35
Shots
24

4 May 2019; 17:30	Kazakhstan	3–2 OT (2–0, 0–1, 0–1) (OT: 1–0)	Belarus	Barys Arena, Nur-Sultan; Attendance: 7,418

Game reference

Henrik Karlsson
Goalies
Dmitri Milchakov
Referees:
(Canada) Alexandre Garon
(Czech Republic) Robin Šír
Linesmen:
(France) Nicolas Constantineau
(Belgium) Frederic Monnaie

Mikhailis (St. Pierre, Bochenski) – 08:36	1–0
Zhailauov (Rymarev) – 15:12	2–0
	2–1	26:49 – Demkov (Platt)
	2–2	44:16 – Feoktistov (Volkov, Kitarov)
Shestakov (Asetov, Metalnikov) – 63:42	3–2

4 min
Penalties
10 min
42
Shots
17

5 May 2019; 12:30	Slovenia	9–0 (2–0, 4–0, 3–0)	Lithuania	Barys Arena, Nur-Sultan; Attendance: 361

Game reference

Luka Gračnar
Goalies
Mantas Armalis
Laurynas Lubys
Referees:
(Russia) Yuri Oskirko
(Switzerland) Marc Alain Wiegand
Linesmen:
(France) Nicolas Constantineau
(South Korea) Park Jun-soo

Sabolič (Kovačevič, Kopitar) – 03:54	1–0
Drozg (Zajc, Repe) – 16:16	2–0
Kopitar (Kovačevič, Sabolič) – 28:16	3–0
Čimžar (Podlipnik, Hebar) – 28:48	4–0
Goličič (Drozg, Zajc) – 34:47	5–0
Ograjenšek (Kuralt, Verlič) – 39:29	6–0
Drozg (Zajc, Goličič) – 49:05	7–0
Magovac (Kalan) – 55:23	8–0
Drozg (Kalan) – 59:01	9–0

18 min
Penalties
10 min
35
Shots
31

5 May 2019; 16:00	Belarus	1–4 (1–0, 0–1, 0–3)	South Korea	Barys Arena, Nur-Sultan; Attendance: 349

Game reference

Dmitri Milchakov
Goalies
Matt Dalton
Referees:
(Norway) Roy Stian Hansen
(Finland) Kristian Vikman
Linesmen:
(Belgium) Frederic Monnaie
(Norway) Alexander Waldejer

Demkov (Platt) – 02:39	1–0
	1–1	28:48 – Shin Sang-h.
	1–2	49:07 – Shin Sang-h. (Plante, Cho)
	1–3	56:36 – Shin Sang-h. (Lee C.)
	1–4	58:47 – Shin Sang-h. (Cho) (EN)

0 min
Penalties
4 min
30
Shots
23

5 May 2019; 19:30	Kazakhstan	3–1 (0–0, 1–0, 2–1)	Hungary	Barys Arena, Nur-Sultan; Attendance: 7,096

Game reference

Sergei Kudryavtsev
Goalies
Bence Bálizs
Referees:
(Sweden) Christoffer Holm
(Czech Republic) Robin Šír
Linesmen:
(Finland) Markus Hägerström
(Sweden) Tobias Nordlander

Mikhailis (Kleshenko, Kudryavtsev) – 23:50	1–0
Nekryach (Rymarev, Zhailauov) (PP) – 41:52	2–0
	2–1	45:51 – Sofron (Szirányi)
Rymarev (Zhailauov, Dietz) (PP) – 57:15	3–1

2 min
Penalties
8 min
35
Shots
32

=== Awards and statistics ===
==== Awards ====
- Best players selected by the directorate:
  - Best Goaltender: (South Korea) Matt Dalton
  - Best Defenseman: (Kazakhstan) Darren Dietz
  - Best Forward: (Belarus) Geoff Platt

Source: IIHF.com

- Media All-Stars:
  - MVP: (Kazakhstan) Nikita Mikhailis
  - Goaltender: (South Korea) Matt Dalton
  - Defenceman: (Kazakhstan) Darren Dietz / (Kazakhstan) Leonid Metalnikov
  - Forwards: (Kazakhstan) Nikita Mikhailis / (Belarus) Geoff Platt / (South Korea) Kim Sang-wook

Source: IIHF.com

==== Scoring leaders ====
List shows the top skaters sorted by points, then goals.

Player	GP	G	A	Pts	+/−	PIM	POS
(Slovenia) Jan Drozg	5	5	2	7	+7	4	F
(South Korea) Kim Sang-wook	5	4	3	7	+3	0	F
(Belarus) Geoff Platt	5	3	4	7	+3	0	F
(Slovenia) Anže Kopitar	5	2	5	7	+2	2	F
(South Korea) Shin Sang-hoon	5	6	0	6	+4	8	F
(Kazakhstan) Nikita Mikhailis	5	4	2	6	+1	0	F
(Belarus) Artem Demkov	5	3	2	5	+3	0	F
(Slovenia) Robert Sabolič	5	3	2	5	+2	4	F
(South Korea) Kim Ki-sung	5	2	3	5	+2	2	F
(Kazakhstan) Darren Dietz	5	1	4	5	−4	2	D

GP = Games played; G = Goals; A = Assists; Pts = Points; +/− = Plus/minus; PIM = Penalties in minutes; POS = Position
Source: IIHF.com

==== Goaltending leaders ====
Only the top five goaltenders, based on save percentage, who have played at least 40% of their team's minutes, are included in this list.

Player	TOI	GA	GAA	SA	Sv%	SO
(Slovenia) Luka Gračnar	178:47	3	1.01	83	96.51	2
(South Korea) Matt Dalton	299:30	11	2.20	163	93.68	0
(Kazakhstan) Henrik Karlsson	243:42	6	1.48	65	91.55	0
(Belarus) Dmitri Milchakov	237:47	8	2.02	78	90.70	0
(Hungary) Ádám Vay	149:17	8	3.22	67	89.33	0

TOI = Time on Ice (minutes:seconds); SA = Shots against; GA = Goals against; GAA = Goals against average; Sv% = Save percentage; SO = Shutouts
Source: IIHF.com

== Group B tournament ==
2019 IIHF World Championship Division I B

Tournament details
- Host country: Estonia
- Venue: 1 (in 1 host city)
- Dates: 28 April–4 May
- Teams: 6

Tournament statistics
- Games played: 15
- Goals scored: 100 (6.67 per game)
- Attendance: 16,174 (1,078 per game)
- Scoring leader: (Poland) Damian Kapica (10 points)

Official website
- Website

=== Participants ===
Team	Qualification
Poland	Placed 6th in Division I A in 2018 and was relegated.
Japan	Placed 2nd in Division I B in 2018.
Estonia	Host, placed 3rd in Division I B in 2018.
Ukraine	Placed 4th in Division I B in 2018.
Romania	Placed 5th in Division I B in 2018.
Netherlands	Placed 1st in Division II A in 2018 and was promoted.

=== Match officials ===
4 referees and 7 linesmen were selected for the tournament.

Referees	Linesmen
(Austria) Kristijan Nikolic; (Denmark) Mads Frandsen; (France) Geoffrey Barcelo; (Hungary) Miklós Haszonits	(Austria) David Nothegger; (Estonia) Toivo Tilku; (Germany) Jonas Merten; (Russia) Yevgeni Yudin; (Serbia) Ivan Nedeljković; (Slovenia) Gašper Zganc; (United States) Jake Davis

=== Standings ===
Pos	Team	Pld	W	OTW	OTL	L	GF	GA	GD	Pts	Qualification or relegation
1	Romania (P)	5	3	2	0	0	18	9	+9	13 (Note: Poland 2–3 (OT) Romania)	Promotion to 2020 Division I A
2	Poland	5	4	0	1	0	27	13	+14	13	
3	Japan	5	2	0	0	3	16	17	−1	6 (Note: Japan 5–2 Estonia)	
4	Estonia (H)	5	1	1	1	2	15	16	−1	6	
5	Ukraine	5	1	0	1	3	17	20	−3	4	
6	Netherlands (R)	5	1	0	0	4	7	25	−18	3	Relegation to 2020 Division II A

Source: IIHF
Rules for classification: 1) points; 2) head-to-head points; 3) head-to-head goal difference; 4) head-to-head number of goals scored; 5) result against closest best-ranked team outside tied teams; 6) result against second-best ranked team outside tied teams; 7) seeding before tournament.
(H) Host; (P) Promoted; (R) Relegated

=== Results ===
All times are local (UTC+3).

28 April 2019; 13:00	Ukraine	2–3 (1–2, 1–1, 0–0)	Japan	Tondiraba Ice Hall, Tallinn; Attendance: 450

Game reference

Bogdan Dyachenko
Goalies
Michikazu Hata
Referee:
(Denmark) Mads Frandsen
Linesmen:
(Estonia) Toivo Tilku
(Russia) Yevgeni Yudin

	0–1	04:43 – Hirano (H. Sato, Y. Terao)
Lyalka (Mikhnov) – 08:16	1–1
	1–2	12:52 – H. Sato (Hirano)
	1–3	37:42 – Saito (Nakayashiki, K. Sato)
Pangelov-Yuldashev – 39:46	2–3

6 min
Penalties
22 min
22
Shots
26

28 April 2019; 16:30	Romania	4–3 GWS (2–0, 0–2, 1–1) (OT: 0–0) (SO: 1–0)	Estonia	Tondiraba Ice Hall, Tallinn; Attendance: 1,543

Game reference

Patrik Polc
Goalies
Villem-Henrik Koitmaa
Referee:
(Austria) Kristijan Nikolic
Linesmen:
(United States) Jake Davis
(Germany) Jonas Merten

Rokaly (Részegh, Butochnov) – 07:22	1–0
Góga (Bors, Gliga) – 18:14	2–0
	2–1	27:26 – Makrov (Ossipov)
	2–2	30:33 – Rooba (Makrov, Novikov)
Borysenko (Gliga) – 42:24	3–2
	3–3	49:24 – Kerna (Rooba)

Rokaly (miss)
Constantin (miss)
Butochnov
Részegh (miss)
Borysenko
Borysenko (miss)
Tranca
Rokaly
Shootout
(miss) Sibirtsev
Makrov
(miss) Rooba
(miss) Petrov
Arrak
(miss) Makrov
Rooba
(miss) Rooba
6 min
Penalties
6 min
30
Shots
39

28 April 2019; 20:00	Netherlands	1–8 (1–1, 0–2, 0–5)	Poland	Tondiraba Ice Hall, Tallinn; Attendance: 352

Game reference

Tomislav Hrelja
Martijn Oosterwijk
Goalies
Przemysław Odrobny
Referee:
(France) Geoffrey Barcelo
Linesmen:
(Serbia) Ivan Nedeljković
(Slovenia) Gašper Zganc

Klem (Oosterveld) – 13:06	1–0
	1–1	17:40 – Neupauer (Kostek, Kapica)
	1–2	33:34 – Komorski (Jeziorski)
	1–3	35:42 – Łyszczarczyk (Gościński)
	1–4	41:59 – Komorski (Łyszczarczyk, Kapica) (PP)
	1–5	44:00 – Wronka (Kolusz, Jaśkiewicz)
	1–6	46:31 – Dziubiński (Kolusz)
	1–7	48:00 – Domogała
	1–8	50:03 – Neupauer (Łyszczarczyk)

4 min
Penalties
6 min
7
Shots
61

29 April 2019; 13:00	Japan	2–3 (2–0, 0–2, 0–1)	Romania	Tondiraba Ice Hall, Tallinn; Attendance: 240

Game reference

Michikazu Hata
Goalies
Patrik Polc
Referee:
(Hungary) Miklos Haszonits
Linesmen:
(Germany) Jonas Merten
(Estonia) Toivo Tilku

Nakayashiki (Saito, Minoshima) – 13:16	1–0
K. Sato (Minoshima, Ito) – 17:59	2–0
	2–1	33:15 – Részegh (PP)
	2–2	34:04 – Bíró (Balázs, Constantin)
	2–3	56:37 – Salló (Bíró, Borysenko)

2 min
Penalties
6 min
27
Shots
27

29 April 2019; 16:30	Poland	7–3 (2–1, 4–1, 1–1)	Ukraine	Tondiraba Ice Hall, Tallinn; Attendance: 579

Game reference

John Murray
Goalies
Artur Ohandzhanyan
Bogdan Dyachenko
Referee:
(Austria) Kristijan Nikolic
Linesmen:
(Austria) David Nothegger
(Slovenia) Gašper Zganc

Kapica (Wronka, Bryk) – 15:56	1–0
	1–1	17:53 – Tolstushko (Zadoyenko)
Kapica (Łyszczarczyk, Kolusz) – 19:02	2–1
Domogała (Jaśkiewicz, Michalski) – 22:39	3–1
Kapica (Neupauer) – 24:00	4–1
	4–2	26:26 – Lyalka (Petrukhno)
Kapica (Bryk, Neupauer) – 27:07	5–2
Komorski (Gościński) – 27:32	6–2
Kapica – 41:06	7–2
	7–3	48:56 – Babynets (Peresunko, Tolstushko) (PP)

6 min
Penalties
10 min
40
Shots
21

29 April 2019; 20:00	Estonia	4–1 (1–0, 2–1, 1–0)	Netherlands	Tondiraba Ice Hall, Tallinn; Attendance: 1,952

Game reference

Villem-Henrik Koitmaa
Goalies
Martijn Oosterwijk
Referee:
(Denmark) Mads Frandsen
Linesmen:
(Serbia) Ivan Nedeljković
(Russia) Yevgeni Yudin

Sibirtsev – 04:10	1–0
	1–1	20:11 – Oosterveld (Bison)
Usov (Andrejev, Petrov) – 20:50	2–1
Sorokin (Embrich) – 30:30	3–1
Rooba (Lahesalu, Makrov) (PP) – 46:20	4–1

6 min
Penalties
12 min
43
Shots
14

1 May 2019; 13:00	Netherlands	1–8 (0–1, 1–4, 0–3)	Ukraine	Tondiraba Ice Hall, Tallinn; Attendance: 398

Game reference

Tomislav Hrelja
Goalies
Bogdan Dyachenko
Referee:
(Hungary) Miklós Haszonits
Linesmen:
(United States) Jake Davis
(Russia) Yevgeni Yudin

	0–1	19:33 – Mikhnov
Mason (Klem) (PP) – 27:23	1–1
	1–2	32:40 – Skrypets (Peresunko, Babynets)
	1–3	32:51 – Merezhko (Zadoyenko, Danylenko)
	1–4	33:25 – Lyalka (Tolstushko, Mikhnov)
	1–5	36:00 – Mazur (Grygoryev, Mikhnov)
	1–6	44:34 – Mikhnov (Lyalka, Mazur) (PP)
	1–7	49:49 – Lyalka (Mikhnov, Pangelov-Yuldashev) (PP)
	1–8	58:49 – Lyalka (Mikhnov, Mazur) (PP)

8 min
Penalties
2 min
10
Shots
48

1 May 2019; 16:30	Japan	5–2 (4–1, 0–0, 1–1)	Estonia	Tondiraba Ice Hall, Tallinn; Attendance: 2,235

Game reference

Michikazu Hata
Goalies
Roman Shumikhin
Referee:
(France) Geoffrey Barcelo
Linesmen:
(Germany) Jonas Merten
(Slovenia) Gašper Zganc

Iwamoto (Furuhashi, H. Sato) (PP) – 00:44	1–0
	1–1	03:37 – Slessarevski (Makrov, Arrak)
Hashiba (H. Terao, Y. Terao) (PP) – 08:06	2–1
Hirano (Furuhashi, Hashimoto) (PP2) – 16:34	3–1
Yamada (H. Terao, Y. Terao) – 18:22	4–1
K. Sato (Hashiba, Saito) – 54:46	5–1
	5–2	57:49 – Embrich (Ossipov, Shumikhin) (PP)

8 min
Penalties
14 min
34
Shots
23

1 May 2019; 20:00	Poland	2–3 OT (0–1, 0–0, 2–1) (OT: 0–1)	Romania	Tondiraba Ice Hall, Tallinn; Attendance: 387

Game reference

Przemysław Odrobny
Goalies
Zoltán Tőke
Referee:
(Denmark) Mads Frandsen
Linesmen:
(Austria) David Nothegger
(Estonia) Toivo Tilku

	0–1	08:37 – Rokaly (Részegh, Butochnov) (PP2)
Kapica (Dronia, Wronka) (PP) – 51:56	1–1
	1–2	53:25 – Butochnov
Dziubiński (Dronia, Neupauer) (EA) – 59:37	2–2
	2–3	64:07 – Borysenko (Gliga) (PP)

6 min
Penalties
8 min
38
Shots
23

2 May 2019; 13:00	Japan	2–3 (0–1, 0–1, 2–1)	Netherlands	Tondiraba Ice Hall, Tallinn; Attendance: 238

Game reference

Michikazu Hata
Goalies
Martijn Oosterwijk
Referee:
(Hungary) Miklós Haszonits
Linesmen:
(Serbia) Ivan Nedeljković
(Austria) David Nothegger

	0–1	09:27 – De Hondt (Vogelaar) (PP)
	0–2	31:02 – Vogelaar (Stempher, Mason) (SH)
H. Terao (Y. Terao, Hayata) – 54:12	1–2
	1–3	58:28 – Stempher (Vogelaar) (EN)
Nakayashiki (Furuhashi, H. Sato) (EA) – 59:28	2–3

8 min
Penalties
8 min
43
Shots
24

2 May 2019; 16:30	Ukraine	1–5 (0–2, 1–1, 0–2)	Romania	Tondiraba Ice Hall, Tallinn; Attendance: 450

Game reference

Bogdan Dyachenko
Goalies
Patrik Polc
Referee:
(Austria) Kristijan Nikolic
Linesmen:
(Estonia) Toivo Tilku
(Russia) Yevgeni Yudin

	0–1	03:52 – Balázs (Tranca) (PP)
	0–2	19:50 – Bíró (Borysenko, Gliga) (PP)
Babynets (Butsenko, Gavryk) – 37:18	1–2
	1–3	39:21 – Constantin (Tranca, Rokaly)
	1–4	47:39 – Butochnov (Borysenko, Bíró)
	1–5	57:28 – Rokaly (PS)

6 min
Penalties
6 min
31
Shots
20

2 May 2019; 20:00	Estonia	2–3 (0–1, 0–0, 2–2)	Poland	Tondiraba Ice Hall, Tallinn; Attendance: 2,150

Game reference

Villem-Henrik Koitmaa
Goalies
John Murray
Referee:
(France) Geoffrey Barcelo
Linesmen:
(United States) Jake Davis
(Slovenia) Gašper Zganc

	0–1	14:57 – Komorski (Marzec, Dronia)
	0–2	45:44 – Komorski
	0–3	47:29 – Neupauer (Kolusz, Starzyński)
Makrov (Ossipov) (PP) – 50:13	1–3
Rooba (Arrak, Sibirtsev) – 52:52	2–3

8 min
Penalties
16 min
33
Shots
33

4 May 2019; 13:00	Romania	3–1 (1–0, 1–1, 1–0)	Netherlands	Tondiraba Ice Hall, Tallinn; Attendance: 431

Game reference

Zoltán Tőke
Goalies
Martijn Oosterwijk
Referee:
(France) Geoffrey Barcelo
Linesmen:
(Germany) Jonas Merten
(Serbia) Ivan Nedeljković

Bíró (Borysenko, Yemelianenko) (PP) – 03:58	1–0
Góga (Butochnov, Rokaly) (PP) – 20:46	2–0
	2–1	37:26 – Boer (Nordemann)
Balázs (Yemelianenko, Tranca) (EN) – 58:16	3–1

10 min
Penalties
22 min
32
Shots
15

4 May 2019; 16:30	Poland	7–4 (1–1, 4–0, 2–3)	Japan	Tondiraba Ice Hall, Tallinn; Attendance: 842

Game reference

John Murray
Goalies
Takuto Onoda
Michikazu Hata
Referee:
(Austria) Kristijan Nikolic
Linesmen:
(United States) Jake Davis
(Russia) Yevgeni Yudin

Marzec (Michalski, Kolusz) – 05:07	1–0
	1–1	07:10 – Y. Terao (Hashiba) (PP)
Dziubiński – 22:55	2–1
Gościński – 23:13	3–1
Wronka (Kapica, Kolusz) – 29:07	4–1
Jeziorski (Malasiński, Bryk) – 38:21	5–1
	5–2	42:48 – Nakayashiki (H. Sato, K. Sato) (SH)
Bryk (Wronka, Komorski) (PP) – 52:00	6–2
	6–3	52:24 – Shinohara (H. Sato, Furuhashi)
Komorski (Kapica) – 59:30	7–3
	7–4	59:58 – Nakayashiki (Furuhashi)

10 min
Penalties
8 min
37
Shots
25

4 May 2019; 20:00	Estonia	4–3 OT (1–3, 1–0, 1–0) (OT: 1–0)	Ukraine	Tondiraba Ice Hall, Tallinn; Attendance: 3,927

Game reference

Villem-Henrik Koitmaa
Goalies
Bogdan Dyachenko
Referee:
(Denmark) Mads Frandsen
Linesmen:
(Austria) David Nothegger
(Slovenia) Gašper Zganc

	0–1	01:35 – Merezhko (Hrytsenko, Nimenko)
	0–2	01:55 – Lyalka (Pangelov-Yuldashev, Merezhko)
Petrov (Makrov) – 03:51	1–2
	1–3	14:59 – Babynets (Cherdak) (PP)
Vitanen (Embrich, Svarogin) – 39:24	2–3
Andrejev (Petrov) – 50:54	3–3
Rooba (Lahesalu, Petrov) (PP) – 61:22	4–3

2 min
Penalties
18 min
38
Shots
17

=== Awards and statistics ===
==== Awards ====
- Best players selected by the directorate:
  - Best Goaltender: (Romania) Patrik Polc
  - Best Defenseman: (Romania) Pavlo Borysenko
  - Best Forward: (Poland) Patryk Wronka

Source: IIHF

==== Scoring leaders ====
List shows the top skaters sorted by points, then goals.

Player	GP	G	A	Pts	+/−	PIM	POS
(Poland) Damian Kapica	5	6	4	10	+11	2	F
(Poland) Filip Komorski	5	6	1	7	+6	2	F
(Ukraine) Vitali Lyalka	5	6	1	7	+3	2	F
(Ukraine) Andriy Mikhnov	5	2	5	7	+3	4	F
(Poland) Bartłomiej Neupauer	5	3	3	6	+8	0	F
(Romania) Pavlo Borysenko	5	2	4	6	+4	6	D
(Estonia) Andrei Makrov	5	2	4	6	+3	4	F
(Japan) Hiroto Sato	5	1	5	6	+3	4	D
(Poland) Marcin Kolusz	5	0	6	6	+11	0	D
(Japan) Yushi Nakayashiki	5	4	1	5	+4	2	F
(Estonia) Robert Rooba	5	4	1	5	0	0	F

GP = Games played; G = Goals; A = Assists; Pts = Points; +/− = Plus/minus; PIM = Penalties in minutes; POS = Position
Source: IIHF.com

==== Goaltending leaders ====
Only the top five goaltenders, based on save percentage, who have played at least 40% of their team's minutes, are included in this list.

Player	TOI	GA	GAA	SA	Sv%	SO
(Romania) Zoltán Tőke	124:07	3	1.45	53	94.34	0
(Romania) Patrik Polc	185:00	6	1.95	97	93.81	0
(Netherlands) Martijn Oosterwijk	198:03	13	3.94	132	90.15	0
(Japan) Michikazu Hata	267:34	12	2.69	117	89.74	0
(Estonia) Villem-Henrik Koitmaa	243:31	10	2.46	93	89.25	0

TOI = Time on Ice (minutes:seconds); SA = Shots against; GA = Goals against; GAA = Goals against average; Sv% = Save percentage; SO = Shutouts
Source: IIHF.com
