= Oleksei Voytsekhovsky =

Ukrainian ice hockey player

Oleksii Voitsekhovskyi
- Born: May 10, 1987 (age 38); Kyiv, Ukrainian SSR
- Height: 1.79 m (5 ft 10 in)
- Weight: 74 kg (163 lb; 11 st 9 lb)
- Position: Forward
- Shoots: Right
- TBHSL team Former teams: Zeytinburnu Belediyespor: 2002–2003 HK Kyiv; 2003–2004 HK Kyiv; HK Gomel-2; 2004–2005 HK Gomel-2; 2005–2006 Sokil Kyiv-2; Sokil Kyiv; HK Kyiv; 2006–2007 Sokil Kyiv; HK Gomel-2; 2007–2008 Sokil Kyiv-2; 2008–2009 Sokil Kyiv; Sokil Kyiv-2; 2009–2010 Sokil Kyiv-2; Gornyak Rudny; 2010–2011 Kazakhmys Satpaev; Sokil Kyiv-2; Sokil Kyiv; 2011–2012 HK Kryzhynka Kompanion; HC Donbass-2; Kharkivski Akuly; Bilyy Bars Brovary; 2012–2014 Sokil Kyiv; 2014– Zeytinburnu BSK
- Playing career: 2002–present

Oleksii Vitaliiovych Voitsekhovskyi (Ukrainian: Олексій Віталійович Войцеховський; born May 10, 1987) is a Ukrainian ice hockey forward currently playing in the Turkish Ice Hockey Super League for Zeytinburnu Belediyespor. He was a member of the Ukraine national junior team. The 1.79 m (5 ft 10 1/2 in) tall player at 74 kg (163 lb) shoots right-handed.

== Playing career ==
=== Club ===
Voytsekhovsky began his ice hockey career at hie hometown club HK Kyiv in 2002 appearing in the regional Eastern European Hockey League B, which was formed by the neighboring countries Belarus, Latvia, Lithuania and Ukraine. He then played for HK Gomel-2 (2004–2005), Sokil Kyiv-2 and Sokil Kyiv in his country before he moved to Kazakhstan to join Gornyak Rudny (2009–10) and then Kazakhmys Satpaev (2010–11). In 2011, he returned home to play for the teams Sokil Kyiv-2, Sokil Kyiv, HK Kryzhynka Kompanion, HC Donbass-2, Kharkivski Akuly and Bilyy Bars Brovary. In 2014, he signed a contract with the Istanbul-based club Zeytinburnu BSK to play in the Turkish Ice Hockey Super League.

He enjoyed winning twice the champion title in the 2014–15 and 2015–16 Turkish Super League seasons. His team won the first round of the 2016–17 IIHF Continental Cup and advanced to the second round.

=== International ===
Voytsekhovsky was a member of the Ukraine national U-18 team and took part at the IIHF World U18 Championships in 2004 Division II and 2005 Division I.

With the Ukraine national junior team he appeared at the IIHF World U20 Championship in 2004, 2005 Division I and 2006 Division I.

== Honours ==
=== Club ===
- Gold 2007–08 Ukrainian Hockey Championship Sokil Kyiv-2,
- Gold 2008–09 Ukrainian Hockey Championship Sokil Kyiv,
- Gold 2011–12 Professional Hockey League season Sokil Kyiv,
- Bronze 2013–14 Ukrainian Hockey Championship Sokil Kyiv,
- Gold 2014–15 Turkish Ice Hockey Super League Zeytinburnu BSK,
- Gold 2015–16 Turkish Ice Hockey Super League Zeytinburnu BSK,
- Gold 2016–17 IIHF Continental Cup – First round Zeytinburnu BSK.

=== International ===
- Gold 2004 IIHF World U18 Championship Division II,
- Bronze 2005 IIHF World U18 Championship Division I,
