= Podlipnik (surname) =

Podlipnik is a Slovenian surname. Notable people with the surname include:

- Hans Podlipnik Castillo (born 1988), Chilean tennis player and coach
- Matic Podlipnik (born 1992), Slovenian ice hockey player
