= Maximilian Dimitrovici =

German ice hockey player

- Born: February 22, 1989 (age 37) Erfurt, East Germany
- Height: 1.88 m (6 ft 2 in)
- Weight: 81 kg (179 lb; 12 st 11 lb)
- Position: Defenceman
- Shot: Left
- TBHSL team Former teams: Zeytinburnu BS: 2004–2005 ETC Crimmitschau U18; 2005–2007 ESC Erfurt U20; 2007–2010 EHC Thüringen U20; 2010–2014 Black Dragons Erfurt; 2014–2015 Zeytinburnu BS; 2010–2016 Black Dragons Erfurt; 2016– Zeytinburnu BS
- Playing career: 2004–2019

Maximilian Siegfried Franz Dimitrovici (born February 22, 1989), aka Maximilian Dimitrovici, is a German ice hockey defenceman. Currently, he plays in the Turkish Ice Hockey Super League for Zeytinburnu BS. The 1.88 m (6 ft 2 in) tall player at 81 kg (179 lb) shoots left-handed.

== Playing career ==
Dimitrovici began his ice hockey career appearing in the 2004–05 Jugend-BL, the youth level of German ice hockey, for the U18 team of ETC Crimmitschau. Then, he played for ESC Erfurt U20 (2005–2007 Junioren-BL), EHC Thüringen U20 (2007–2010 Junioren-BL) and Black Dragons Erfurt (2010–2014 Germany 3). In the 2014–15 season, he moved to Turkey to play for the Istanbul-based team Zeytinburnu BS in the Turkish Ice Hockey Super League. After one season, he returned to his former club Black Dragons Erfurt in her hometown. For the 2016–17 season, he rejoined his team in Turkey.
