= Geoff Platt =

Canadian ice hockey player (born 1985)

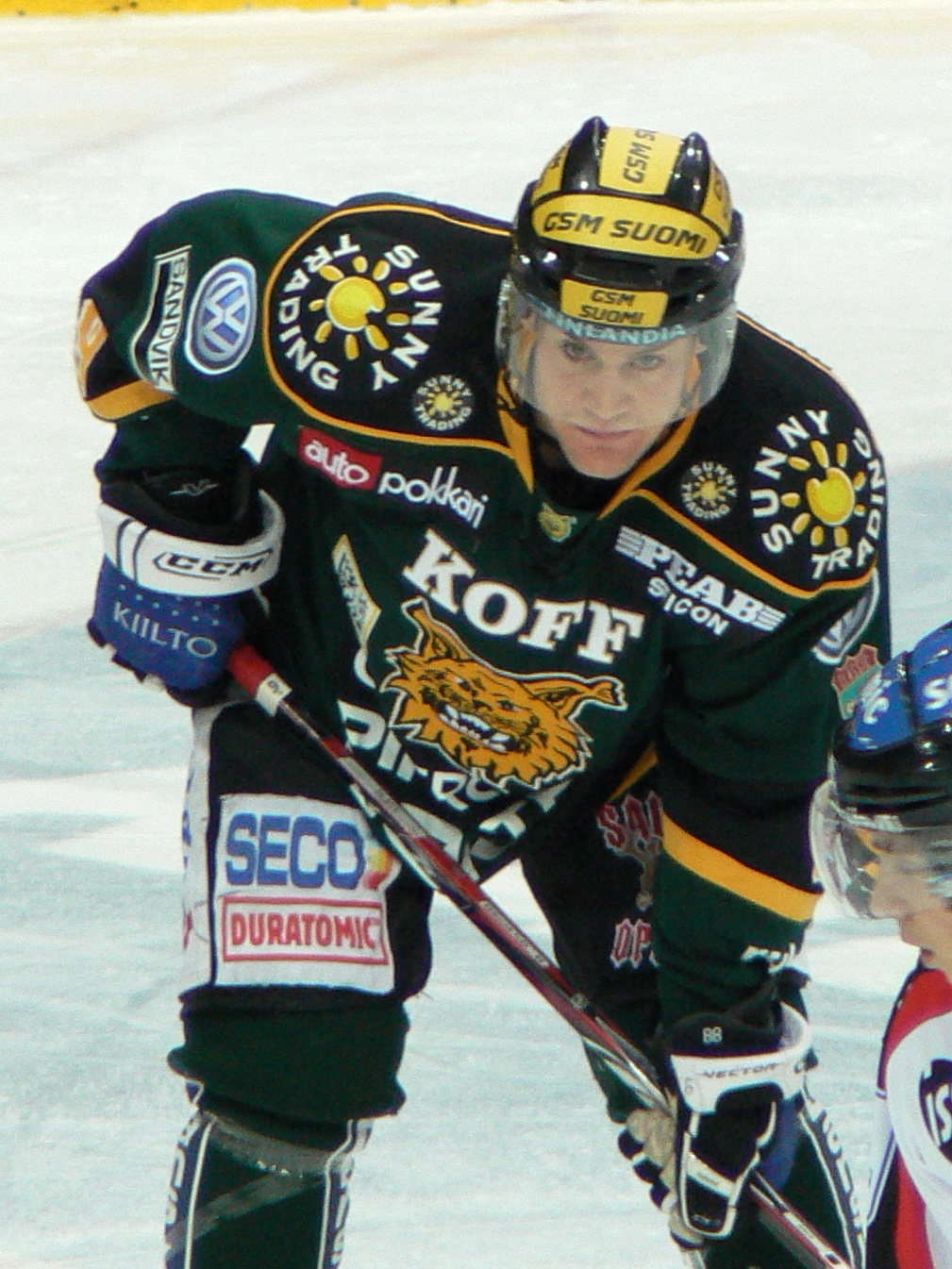
- Platt playing for Ilves in 2008
- Born: July 10, 1985 (age 41) Toronto, Ontario, Canada
- Height: 5 ft 9 in (175 cm)
- Weight: 183 lb (83 kg; 13 st 1 lb)
- Position: Centre
- Shot: Left
- Played for: Columbus Blue Jackets; Anaheim Ducks; Dinamo Minsk; Ilves; Lokomotiv Yaroslavl; CSKA Moscow; Växjö Lakers; Jokerit; Avtomobilist Yekaterinburg; Salavat Yulaev Ufa; JYP Jyväskylä; Tappara
- National team: Belarus
- NHL draft: Undrafted
- Playing career: 2005–2023

Geoff Platt (born July 10, 1985) is a Canadian–Belarusian former professional ice hockey player. He played for the Växjö Lakers of the Swedish Hockey League (SHL), KHL outfit Dinamo Minsk, Ilves Tampere, JYP Jyväskyläand Tappara of the Finnish Liiga and the Columbus Blue Jackets and Anaheim Ducks of the National Hockey League (NHL).

Born and raised in Canada, Platt played major junior in the Ontario Hockey League before spending several years between the NHL and its minor league affiliate the American Hockey League (AHL). In 2008 Platt received an offer to join Ilves in Finland, briefly playing in Belarus beforehand. He played in Finland for one season before returning to Minsk the following year, and spent nearly five full seasons with Dinamo before being traded to Lokomotiv in 2013. Platt had previously played for the Canadian national under-18 team, winning a gold medal at the 2003 IIHF World U18 Championships, but in 2012 he acquired Belarusian citizenship, and having satisfied the International Ice Hockey Federation (IIHF) criteria, was able to represent Belarus starting at the 2014 IIHF World Championship held in Minsk.

== Playing career ==
As a youth, Platt played in the 1999 Quebec International Pee-Wee Hockey Tournament with a minor ice hockey team from North York.

Platt played junior ice hockey in the Ontario Hockey League for the North Bay Centennials, Saginaw Spirit and the Erie Otters. He has played in the NHL with the Columbus Blue Jackets and the Anaheim Ducks.

On February 26, 2012, after playing for five years with Kontinental Hockey League's (KHL) Dinamo Minsk, Platt accepted Belarusian citizenship.

In the 2013–14 season, as leading scorer of Dinamo Minsk in the midst of his 6th season with the club, Platt was traded to Lokomotiv Yaroslavl for monetary compensation on December 30, 2013. He was later signed to a two-year contract extension with Lokomotiv through to the 2016 season on January 3, 2014.

On August 16, 2015, a few days before the start of the new KHL season, Lokomotiv Yaroslavl broke the contract with him. Lokomotiv's general manager explained this by the uncertain legal status of foreign players in KHL (Lokomotiv had signed 6 foreign players including him while the limit of foreign players for the Russian clubs is only 5 players in the roster) and by Geoff's lack of the Russian passport. Two days later he signed a contract with CSKA Moscow.

Platt left Moscow upon the conclusion of the 2015–16 campaign and took his game to Sweden, signing with the Växjö Lakers of the Swedish Hockey League (SHL) on June 23, 2016. On December 14, 2016, he returned to CSKA Moscow for a second stint.

On May 7, 2019, Platt signed as a free agent to a two-year contract to continue in the KHL with Avtomobilist Yekaterinburg.

In the midst of his final year under contract with Avtomobilist in the 2020–21, Platt left the club after collecting six points through 28 games and signed for the remainder of the season with Salavat Yulaev Ufa on December 21, 2020.

After the 2022 Russian invasion of Ukraine, he elected to leave the team.

As a free agent, Platt opted to continue his career by returning to the Finnish Liiga and agreed to a one-year contract with JYP Jyväskylä, on July 11, 2022. However, on December 1, he and JYP Jyväskylä agreed to mutually terminate the contract, and then Platt signed with Tappara for the rest of the 2022–23 season.

== International play ==
Medal record

Representing Canada

Ice hockey

World U18 Championships
Gold medal – first place	2003 Yaroslavl	

Platt was a member of the Canadian national under-18 team during the 2003 IIHF World U18 Championships. He scored three goals in seven games as Canada won the gold medal. After acquiring Belarusian citizenship in 2012 and playing the required amount of time in Belarus, Platt became eligible to represent Belarus in 2014. His first IIHF tournament at which he represented Belarus was the 2014 World Championship, which was held in Minsk. Platt scored three goals and two assists as Belarus finished seventh in the tournament.

== Personal life ==
Platt is married to Finnish native Mia Platt since June 2015. They reside in Tampere, Finland during the off-season.

== Career statistics ==
=== Regular season and playoffs ===
			Regular season					Playoffs
Season	Team	League	GP	G	A	Pts	PIM	GP	G	A	Pts	PIM
2000–01	St. Michael's Buzzers	OPJHL	6	2	0	2	4	—	—	—	—	—
2001–02	North Bay Centennials	OHL	63	4	6	10	34	5	0	0	0	6
2002–03	Saginaw Spirit	OHL	62	32	22	54	79	—	—	—	—	—
2003–04	Saginaw Spirit	OHL	27	7	13	20	49	—	—	—	—	—
2003–04	Erie Otters	OHL	28	18	11	29	22	9	9	1	10	22
2004–05	Erie Otters	OHL	68	45	34	79	84	6	2	3	5	16
2004–05	Atlantic City Boardwalk Bullies	ECHL	2	0	2	2	0	3	0	0	0	0
2005–06	Syracuse Crunch	AHL	66	30	35	65	58	6	3	0	3	6
2005–06	Columbus Blue Jackets	NHL	15	0	5	5	16	—	—	—	—	—
2006–07	Syracuse Crunch	AHL	52	27	21	48	59	—	—	—	—	—
2006–07	Columbus Blue Jackets	NHL	26	4	5	9	10	—	—	—	—	—
2007–08	Syracuse Crunch	AHL	15	4	3	7	6	—	—	—	—	—
2007–08	Portland Pirates	AHL	60	28	30	58	49	18	8	9	17	24
2007–08	Anaheim Ducks	NHL	5	0	0	0	2	—	—	—	—	—
2008–09	Dinamo Minsk	KHL	13	2	3	5	8	—	—	—	—	—
2008–09	Ilves	SM-l	45	19	18	37	54	3	1	0	1	4
2009–10	Dinamo Minsk	KHL	56	26	18	44	77	—	—	—	—	—
2010–11	Dinamo Minsk	KHL	54	18	15	33	46	7	4	3	7	4
2011–12	Dinamo Minsk	KHL	47	13	17	30	42	4	1	0	1	4
2012–13	Dinamo Minsk	KHL	50	13	15	28	76	—	—	—	—	—
2013–14	Dinamo Minsk	KHL	40	15	14	29	8	—	—	—	—	—
2013–14	Lokomotiv Yaroslavl	KHL	16	6	5	11	2	18	5	4	9	20
2014–15	Lokomotiv Yaroslavl	KHL	60	17	13	30	24	6	1	0	1	2
2015–16	CSKA Moscow	KHL	55	21	14	35	46	12	6	4	10	12
2016–17	Växjö Lakers	SHL	25	10	5	15	12	—	—	—	—	—
2016–17	CSKA Moscow	KHL	18	6	1	7	16	10	3	1	4	6
2017–18	CSKA Moscow	KHL	28	8	3	11	2	10	0	2	2	6
2018–19	Jokerit	KHL	60	11	13	24	32	4	0	0	0	4
2019–20	Avtomobilist Yekaterinburg	KHL	52	12	7	19	28	5	1	0	1	4
2020–21	Avtomobilist Yekaterinburg	KHL	28	3	3	6	6	—	—	—	—	—
2020–21	Salavat Yulaev Ufa	KHL	22	6	4	10	12	9	1	1	2	4
2021–22	Salavat Yulaev Ufa	KHL	40	3	7	10	14	—	—	—	—	—
2022–23	JYP Jyväskylä	Liiga	18	2	4	6	4	—	—	—	—	—
2022–23	Tappara	Liiga	34	3	8	11	20	5	0	0	0	0
NHL totals			46	4	10	14	28	—	—	—	—	—
KHL totals			630	180	152	332	439	85	22	15	37	66

=== International ===
Year	Team	Event	Result	GP	G	A	Pts	PIM
2003	Canada	U18	1st place, gold medalist(s)	7	3	0	3	0
2014	Belarus	WC	7th	8	3	2	5	0
2016	Belarus	WC	12th	7	3	2	5	2
2016	Belarus	OGQ	DNQ	3	0	2	2	0
2018	Belarus	WC	15th	7	1	3	4	4
2019	Belarus	WC D1A	18th	5	3	4	7	0
2021	Belarus	WC	15th	7	1	0	1	4
2021	Belarus	OGQ	DNQ	3	1	0	1	2
Junior totals				7	3	0	3	0
Senior totals				40	12	13	25	12
