= 2015–16 IIHF Continental Cup =

2015–2016 IIHF Continental Cup
Tournament details
- Dates: 2 October 2015 – 10 January 2016
- Teams: 17

Final positions
- Champions: (France) Dragons de Rouen (2nd title)
- Runners-up: (Denmark) Herning Blue Fox
- Third place: (Poland) GKS Tychy
- Fourth place: (Italy) Asiago

The 2015–16 Continental Cup was the 19th edition of the IIHF Continental Cup, Europe's second-tier ice hockey club competition organised by International Ice Hockey Federation. The season started on 2 October 2015 and the Super Final was played on 8–10 January 2016. Dragons de Rouen won the competition for the second time and also qualified for the 2016–17 Champions Hockey League.

== Qualified teams ==
Location of teams for the 2015–16 IIHF Continental Cup.
Blue: First round; Red: Second round; Green: Third round.

Team	Qualification
Enter in the third round
(Denmark) Herning Blue Fox	2014–15 Metal Ligaen regular season winners
(Kazakhstan) Yertis Pavlodar	2014–15 Kazakhstan Hockey Championship winners
(Italy) Asiago	2014–15 Serie A winners
(Belarus) Shakhtyor Soligorsk	2014–15 Belarusian Extraleague winners
(France) Dragons de Rouen	2014–15 Ligue Magnus regular season runners-up
(Ukraine) Kremenchuk	2014–15 Ukrainian Hockey Championship runners-up
Enter in the second round
(Latvia) Mogo Riga	2014–15 Latvian Hockey League winners
(Slovenia) Jesenice	2014–15 Slovenian Hockey League winners
(Hungary) Miskolci Jegesmedve	2014–15 OB I bajnokság winners
(Spain) Jaca	2014–15 Liga Nacional de Hockey Hielo winners
(United Kingdom) Coventry Blaze	2014–15 Elite League Play-Off winners
(Poland) GKS Tychy	2014–15 Polska Liga Hokejowa winners
(Romania) Dunărea Galați	2014–15 Romanian Hockey League winners
Enter in the first round
(Serbia) Partizan Belgrade	2014–15 Serbian Hockey League winners
(Israel) Rishon Devils	2014–15 Israeli Hockey League winners
(Bulgaria) CSKA Sofia	2014–15 Bulgarian Hockey League winners
(Turkey) Zeytinburnu Belediyespor	2014–15 Turkish Ice Hockey Super League winners

== First round ==
=== Group A ===
The Group A tournament was played in Belgrade, Serbia from 2–4 October 2015 with all games held at the Pionir Ice Hall.

Pos	Team	Pld	W	OTW	OTL	L	GF	GA	GD	Pts	Qualification	(Bulgaria) SOF	(Turkey) ZEY	(Serbia) BEL	(Israel) RIS
1	(Bulgaria) CSKA Sofia	3	3	0	0	0	28	10	+18	9	Advance to Round 2 (Group C)	—	9–5	12–4	7–1
2	(Turkey) Zeytinburnu Belediyespor	3	2	0	0	1	23	14	+9	6		5–9	—	4–1	14–4
3	(Serbia) Partizan Belgrade	3	1	0	0	2	14	17	−3	3		4–12	1–4	—	9–1
4	(Israel) Rishon Devils	3	0	0	0	3	6	30	−24	0		1–7	4–14	1–9	—

Updated to match(es) played on 4 October 2015. Source: IIHF.com

== Second round ==
=== Group B ===
The Group B tournament was played in Miskolc, Hungary from 23 to 25 October 2015 with all games held at the Miskolc Arena.

Pos	Team	Pld	W	OTW	OTL	L	GF	GA	GD	Pts	Qualification	(Latvia) RIG	(Hungary) MIS	(Slovenia) ACJ	(Spain) JAC
1	(Latvia) Mogo Riga	3	3	0	0	0	12	5	+7	9	Advance to Round 3 (Group D)	—	2–1	4–1	6–3
2	(Hungary) Miskolci Jegesmedve	3	2	0	0	1	15	7	+8	6		1–2	—	4–3	10–2
3	(Slovenia) Jesenice	3	1	0	0	2	7	9	−2	3		1–4	3–4	—	3–1
4	(Spain) Jaca	3	0	0	0	3	6	19	−13	0		3–6	2–10	1–3	—

Updated to match(es) played on 25 October 2015. Source: IIHF.com

=== Group C ===
The Group C tournament was played in Tychy, Poland from 23 to 25 October 2015 with all games held at the Tychy Winter Stadium.

Pos	Team	Pld	W	OTW	OTL	L	GF	GA	GD	Pts	Qualification	(Poland) TYC	(United Kingdom) COV	(Romania) DUN	(Serbia) BEL
1	(Poland) GKS Tychy	3	3	0	0	0	37	5	+32	9	Advance to Round 3 (Group E)	—	3–2	8–3	26–0
2	(United Kingdom) Coventry Blaze	3	2	0	0	1	21	6	+15	6		2–3	—	7–2	12–1
3	(Romania) Dunărea Galați	3	1	0	0	2	15	16	−1	3		3–8	2–7	—	10–1
4	(Serbia) Partizan Belgrade (Note: CSKA Sofia, the winners of Group A renounced its participation due to financial problems and were replaced by Group A third-placed team Partizan Belgrade after Group A runners-up Zeytinburnu Belediyespor declined the invitation.)	3	0	0	0	3	2	48	−46	0		0–26	1–12	1–10	—

Updated to match(es) played on 25 October 2015. Source: IIHF.com

== Third round ==
Third round games will be played on 20–22 November 2015. The top-two ranked teams of each third round group will be promoted for the Super final.

=== Group D ===
The Group D tournament is being played in Asiago, Italy from 20 to 22 November 2015.

Pos	Team	Pld	W	OTW	OTL	L	GF	GA	GD	Pts	Qualification	(Denmark) HER	(Italy) ASI	(Kazakhstan) PAV	(Latvia) RIG
1	(Denmark) Herning Blue Fox	3	2	1	0	0	10	3	+7	8	Qualification to Super Final	—	2–1	3–0	5–2
2	(Italy) Asiago	3	2	0	1	0	8	4	+4	7	Qualification to Super Final	1–2	—	3–2	4–0
3	(Kazakhstan) Yertis Pavlodar	3	1	0	0	2	13	8	+5	3		0–3	2–3	—	11–2
4	(Latvia) Mogo Riga	3	0	0	0	3	4	20	−16	0		2–5	0–4	2–11	—

Updated to match(es) played on 22 November 2015. Source: IIHF.com

=== Group E ===
The Group E tournament is being played in Rouen, France from 20 to 22 November 2015.

Pos	Team	Pld	W	OTW	OTL	L	GF	GA	GD	Pts	Qualification	(France) ROU	(Poland) TYC	(Belarus) SOL	(Ukraine) KRE
1	(France) Dragons de Rouen	3	3	0	0	0	13	6	+7	9	Qualification to Super Final	—	5–3	1–0	7–3
2	(Poland) GKS Tychy	3	2	0	0	1	8	7	+1	6	Qualification to Super Final	3–5	—	2–1	3–1
3	(Belarus) Shakhtyor Soligorsk	3	1	0	0	2	7	3	+4	3		0–1	1–2	—	6–0
4	(Ukraine) Kremenchuk	3	0	0	0	3	4	16	−12	0		3–7	1–3	0–6	—

Updated to match(es) played on 22 November 2015. Source: IIHF.com

== Super final ==
Teams in the 2015–16 IIHF Continental Cup Super final.

Super final was played in Rouen, France on 8–10 January 2016.

=== Final group ===
Pos	Team	Pld	W	OTW	OTL	L	GF	GA	GD	Pts	(France) ROU	(Denmark) HER	(Poland) TYC	(Italy) ASI
1	(France) Dragons de Rouen	3	3	0	0	0	14	7	+7	9	—	4–0	6–5	4–2
2	(Denmark) Herning Blue Fox	3	1	0	0	2	5	6	−1	3	0–4	—	1–2	4–0
3	(Poland) GKS Tychy	3	1	0	0	2	9	11	−2	3	5–6	2–1	—	2–4
4	(Italy) Asiago	3	1	0	0	2	6	10	−4	3	2–4	0–4	4–2	—

Updated to match(es) played on 10 January 2016. Source: IIHF.com

== See also ==
- 2016–17 Champions Hockey League
