= Zeytinburnu Belediyespor =

- City: Istanbul, Turkey
- League: Turkish Ice Hockey Super League (TBHSL)
- Founded: May 29, 2010; 16 years ago
- Home arena: Silivrikapı Ice Skating Hall; Capacity: 900
- Colors
- General manager: Halit Albayrak
- Head coach: Deniz İnce

Zeytinburnu Belediyespor, short for (Turkish: Zeytinburnu Belediyesi Buz Hokeyi Takımı), is the ice hockey section of Zeytinburnu Belediye S.K. in Istanbul, founded by the Municipality of Zeytinburnu district in 2010. The team currently competes in the Turkish Ice Hockey Super League (TBHSL) and plays their home matches in Silivrikapı Ice Skating Hall. The club's colors are blue, white and red.

== History ==
In 2010, the Municipality of Zeytinburnu erected two mobile ice-rinks of each 400 m^{2} (4,300 sq ft) in the frame of a social responsibility project called "Doğaya destek sizden, buz pateni biletiniz bizden" (literally: You Support the Nature, We Award the Ticket for Ice Skating) to promote recycling. Citizens were awarded free tickets for ice skating session for the duration of half-an-hour under supervision of trainers in exchange for waste brought to recycle. Street children in the district, who are coming from poor families of mostly southeastern and eastern Anatolian origin with up to 10–12 children, collected waste paper to get free tickets. However, some of them tried to enter without a ticket, caused trouble around the venue, threatened the employees and damaged the ice rink. Noticing the youngsters' interest in ice skating, the municipality officials gave them in the beginning free-of-charge sessions instead of calling in for further security measures. The increasing interest of the street children induced the district mayor Murat Aydın to form an ice hockey team with the support of the Turkish Ice Hockey Federation (TBHF).

The team was established on May 29, 2010. Around twenty youngsters joined the team. Training and playing ice hockey in a team helped rehabilitate the children, many of whom were drug addicted or smokers, and resume their high school education. The addicts with social troubles were transformed into gentile sportspeople.

The team played in the Marmara region Division of the Turkish Ice Hockey First League (TBHBL), the second-level league in Turkey. In the first two seasons, the team lost all league games with high score. The number of players as street children dropped to eight. By and by, the team transferred also professional ice hockey players. Success came in the 2012–13 season. Composed of players aged 17 to 19, Zeytinburnu Belediyespor became regional league leader, and was promoted at the end to the Turkish Ice Hockey Super League (TBHSL).

The club formed also a farm team consisting of 35 minors aged between 10 and 12, who were selected as talented.

== Achievements ==
=== Turkish League ===
The 2012–13 season of the Turkish Ice Hockey First League ended for Zeytinburnu Belediyespor ranking at second place following a defeat by Gümüş Patenler in the play-off final. The team was promoted to the Super League (TBHSL).

The team finished the 2013–14 season as runner-up in their first presence in the TBHSL after losing to Izmir BB GSK in the play-off final.

They became champion in the 2014–15 and 2015–16 seasons, beating their rival from İzmir in the play-offs.

=== Statistics ===
| Season | League | Rank | Pld | W | L | OTW | OTL | GF | GA | GD | Pts |
|---|---|---|---|---|---|---|---|---|---|---|---|
| 2011–12 | First League | | | | | | | | | | |
| 2012–13 | First League | 1 | | | | | | | | | |
| 2013–14 | Super League | 2 | | | | | | | | | |
| 2014–15 | Super League | 1 | 12 | 9 | 3 | 0 | 0 | 183 | 61 | +122 | 27 |
| 2015–16 | Super League | 1 | 10 | 8 | 1 | 0 | 1 | 146 | 20 | +126 | 25 |
| 2016–17 | Super League | 1 | 10 | 10 | 0 | 0 | 0 | 175 | 13 | +162 | 30 |
Green marks a year followed by promotion, red a year followed by relegation.

=== Continental Cup ===
Zeytinburnu BS took part at the 2015–16 IIHF Continental Cup's Group A matches. They won two matches of the three, and failed to advance to the further round.

They participated at the 2016–17 IIHF Continental Cup. They played three matches of the first round in Group A held in Sofia, Bulgaria. Beating all their opponents, they became group champion, and advanced to the second round, which will be held in Jaca, Spain.

| Host | Round | Date | Opponent | Result |
2015–16 IIHF Continental Cup
| Serbia, Belgrade | First; Gr. A | Oct 2, 2015 | (Israel) Rishon Devils | W 14–4 |
| Serbia, Belgrade | First; Gr. A | Oct 3, 2015 | (Serbia) HK Partizan | W 4–1 |
| Serbia, Belgrade | First; Gr. A | Oct 4, 2015 | (Bulgaria) CSKA Sofia | L 5–9 |
2016–17 IIHF Continental Cup
| Bulgaria, Sofia | First; Gr. A | Sep 30, 2016 | (Bulgaria) Irbis-Skate Sofia | W 5–1 |
| Bulgaria, Sofia | First; Gr. A | Oct 1, 2016 | (Serbia) HK Partizan | W 8–3 |
| Bulgaria, Sofia | First; Gr. A | Oct 2, 2016 | (Israel) HC Bat Yam | W 19–2 |
| Spain, Jaca | Second; Gr. B | Oct 21, 2016 | (Latvia) HK Liepāja | L 1–8 |
| Spain, Jaca | Second; Gr. B | Oct 22, 2016 | (United Kingdom) Nottingham Panthers | L 1–12 |
| Spain, Jaca | Second; Gr. B | Oct 23, 2016 | (Spain) CH Jaca | W 7–3 |

== Current roster ==
As of 21 October 2016.

| No. | Player | Nat | Date of Birth and age | C/S | Height | Weight |
Goaltenders
| 1 | Tolga Bozacı | (Turkey) | January 24, 1998 (age 28) | L | 1.76 m (5 ft 9 1/2 in) | 66 kg (146 lb) |
| 35 | Nikita Sandyrev | (Russia) | May 27, 1992 (age 34) | L | 1.83 m (6 ft 0 in) | 67 kg (148 lb) |
Defense
| 8 | Yusuf Kars | (Turkey) | October 15, 1998 (age 27) | L | 1.65 m (5 ft 5 in) | 60 kg (130 lb) |
| 9 | Gökhun Öztürk (C) | (Turkey) | December 16, 1985 (age 40) | L | 1.85 m (6 ft 1 in) | 85 kg (187 lb) |
| 22 | Maximilian Siegfried Franz Dimitrovici | (Germany) | February 22, 1989 (age 37) | L | 1.80 m (5 ft 11 in) | 78 kg (172 lb) |
| 36 | Cengiz Gök | (Turkey) | December 23, 1985 (age 40) | R | 1.72 m (5 ft 7 1/2 in) | 80 kg (180 lb) |
| 44 | Brian Thomas Dunford | (United States) | June 25, 1987 (age 38) | L | 1.78 m (5 ft 10 in) | 82 kg (181 lb) |
| 46 | Barış Coşkun | (Turkey) | July 2, 1984 (age 41) | R | 1.86 m (6 ft 1 in) | 90 kg (200 lb) |
Forwards
| 10 | Doruk Kamış | (Turkey) | May 22, 1984 (age 42) | R | 1.70 m (5 ft 7 in) | 67 kg (148 lb) |
| 11 | Yavuz Karakoç | (Turkey) | July 26, 1988 (age 37) | L | 1.82 m (5 ft 11 1/2 in) | 80 kg (180 lb) |
| 13 | Fatih Taygar | (Turkey) | May 7, 1999 (age 27) | L | 1.87 m (6 ft 1 1/2 in) | 70 kg (150 lb) |
| 16 | Taylan Anlar | (Turkey) | September 13, 1998 (age 27) | R | 1.75 m (5 ft 9 in) | 65 kg (143 lb) |
| 17 | Oleksei Voytsekhovsky (A) | (Ukraine) | May 10, 1987 (age 39) | L | 1.79 m (5 ft 10 1/2 in) | 74 kg (163 lb) |
| 23 | Oleg Zadoenko | (Ukraine) | February 20, 1990 (age 36) | L | 1.76 m (5 ft 9 1/2 in) | 88 kg (194 lb) |
| 24 | Ferhat Bakal | (Turkey) | March 16, 1999 (age 27) | L | 1.90 m (6 ft 3 in) | 75 kg (165 lb) |
| 41 | Serkan Gümüş (A) | (Turkey) | October 17, 1992 (age 33) | L | 1.68 m (5 ft 6 in) | 60 kg (130 lb) |
| 54 | Batuhan Akay | (Turkey) | March 3, 1995 (age 31) | R | 1.73 m (5 ft 8 in) | 60 kg (130 lb) |
| 56 | Mahsum Akkuş | (Turkey) | March 13, 1995 (age 31) | L | 1.75 m (5 ft 9 in) | 65 kg (143 lb) |
| 72 | Konstantin Kuchkin | (Russia) | March 16, 1993 (age 33) | R | 1.85 m (6 ft 1 in) | 84 kg (185 lb) |
| 74 | Faruk Günel | (Turkey) | August 1, 1993 (age 32) | R | 1.80 m (5 ft 11 in) | 80 kg (180 lb) |
| 88 | Enes Can Gültaş | (Turkey) | June 21, 2000 (age 25) | R | 1.80 m (5 ft 11 in) | 75 kg (165 lb) |
| 91 | Anton Peronmaa | (Finland) | August 21, 1993 (age 32) | R | 1.78 m (5 ft 10 in) | 82 kg (181 lb) |

== Coaching staff ==
As of 1 May 2016.

- General Manager: Emre Birinci
- Head coach: Deniz İnce
- Goaltending Coach: Anders Jespersen
- Development Coach: Anders Jespersen

== Former foreign players ==
Canada

- Evan Zych (2014–2015)

Finland

- Anton Peronmaa (2014–2017)
- Riku Arim (2015–2016)
- Rami Heikkilä (2015–2016)

Sweden

- Nafi Kaya (2014–2016)

United States

- Ryan Alves (2015–2016)
- Ryan Bahl (2015–2016)
- Tyler Holske (2015–2016)
