= 2005 IIHF World U18 Championship Division I =

Tournament details
- Host countries: Slovenia; Poland
- Dates: 3–9 April 2005; 2–8 April 2005
- Teams: 12

The 2005 IIHF World U18 Championship Division I were a pair of international under-18 ice hockey tournaments run by the International Ice Hockey Federation. The Division I tournaments made up the second level of competition at the 2005 IIHF World U18 Championships. The Group A tournament took place between 3 April and 9 April 2005 in Maribor, Slovenia and the Group B tournament took place between 2 April and 8 April 2005 in Sosnowiec, Poland. Belarus and Norway won the Group A and Group B tournaments respectively and gained promotion to the Championship Division for the 2006 IIHF World U18 Championships. While Great Britain finished last in Group A and Italy last in Group B and were both relegated to Division II for 2006.

== Group A tournament ==
The Group A tournament began on 3 April 2005 in Maribor, Slovenia. Austria, France, Kazakhstan, and Slovenia all returned to compete in this years Division I tournament after missing promotion to the Championship Division at the previous years World Championships. Great Britain gained promotion to Division I after finishing first in last years Division II Group B tournament and Belarus was relegated from the Championship Division after failing to survive the relegation round at the 2004 IIHF World U18 Championship.

Belarus won the tournament after winning four of their five games, finishing first in the group standings and gained promotion to the Championship Division for the 2006 IIHF World U18 Championships. Slovenia finished in second place and Kazakhstan finished third after only losing to Belarus and Slovenia. Great Britain finished in last place, managing only to win one game and lose the other four and were relegated back to Division II for the 2006 IIHF World U18 Championships. Anže Kopitar of Slovenia finished as the top scorer of the tournament with 11 points, including six goals and five assists. France's Mickael Gasnier and Belarus' Dzmitry Zhurauski finished as the tournaments leading goaltenders with a save percentage of 90.57.

=== Standings ===
Pos	Team	Pld	W	D	L	GF	GA	GD	Pts	Promotion or relegation
1	Belarus	5	4	0	1	23	10	+13	8	Promoted to the Championship Division for 2006
2	Slovenia	5	3	0	2	22	14	+8	6	
3	Kazakhstan	5	3	0	2	19	14	+5	6	
4	France	5	2	0	3	11	14	−3	4	
5	Austria	5	2	0	3	15	25	−10	4	
6	Great Britain	5	1	0	4	10	23	−13	2	Relegated to Division II for 2006

=== Fixtures ===
All times local.

3 April 2005; 13:00	Great Britain	0 – 5 (forfeit)	Belarus	Ledna dvorana TABOR

Game reference

3 April 2005; 16:30	France	4 – 1 (1–0, 3–1, 0–0)	Austria	Ledna dvorana TABOR; Attendance: 413

Game reference

3 April 2005; 20:00	Kazakhstan	3 – 5 (1–1, 0–3, 2–1)	Slovenia	Ledna dvorana TABOR; Attendance: 653

Game reference

4 April 2005; 13:00	Austria	5 – 4 (1–2, 0–0, 4–2)	Great Britain	Ledna dvorana TABOR; Attendance: 392

Game reference

4 April 2005; 16:30	Belarus	3 – 2 (1–0, 0–0, 2–2)	Kazakhstan	Ledna dvorana TABOR; Attendance: 402

Game reference

4 April 2005; 20:00	Slovenia	4 – 1 (3–1, 0–0, 1–0)	France	Ledna dvorana TABOR; Attendance: 812

Game reference

6 April 2005; 13:00	Belarus	2 – 3 (0–0, 0–3, 2–0)	France	Ledna dvorana TABOR; Attendance: 413

Game reference

6 April 2005; 16:30	Great Britain	2 – 4 (1–0, 1–2, 0–2)	Kazakhstan	Ledna dvorana TABOR; Attendance: 405

Game reference

6 April 2005; 20:00	Slovenia	3 – 4 (2–0, 1–2, 0–2)	Austria	Ledna dvorana TABOR; Attendance: 877

Game reference

7 April 2005; 13:00	Kazakhstan	4 – 1 (0–1, 1–0, 3–0)	France	Ledna dvorana TABOR; Attendance: 390

Game reference

7 April 2005; 16:30	Austria	2 – 8 (0–1, 0–3, 2–4)	Belarus	Ledna dvorana TABOR; Attendance: 435

Game reference

7 April 2005; 20:00	Slovenia	7 – 1 (2–1, 2–0, 3–0)	Great Britain	Ledna dvorana TABOR; Attendance: 820

Game reference

9 April 2005; 13:00	Austria	3 – 6 (1–2, 1–3, 1–1)	Kazakhstan	Ledna dvorana TABOR; Attendance: 415

Game reference

9 April 2005; 16:30	France	2 – 3 (0–1, 1–1, 1–1)	Great Britain	Ledna dvorana TABOR; Attendance: 456

Game reference

9 April 2005; 20:00	Belarus	5 – 3 (2–0, 2–2, 1–1)	Slovenia	Ledna dvorana TABOR; Attendance: 822

Game reference

=== Scoring leaders ===
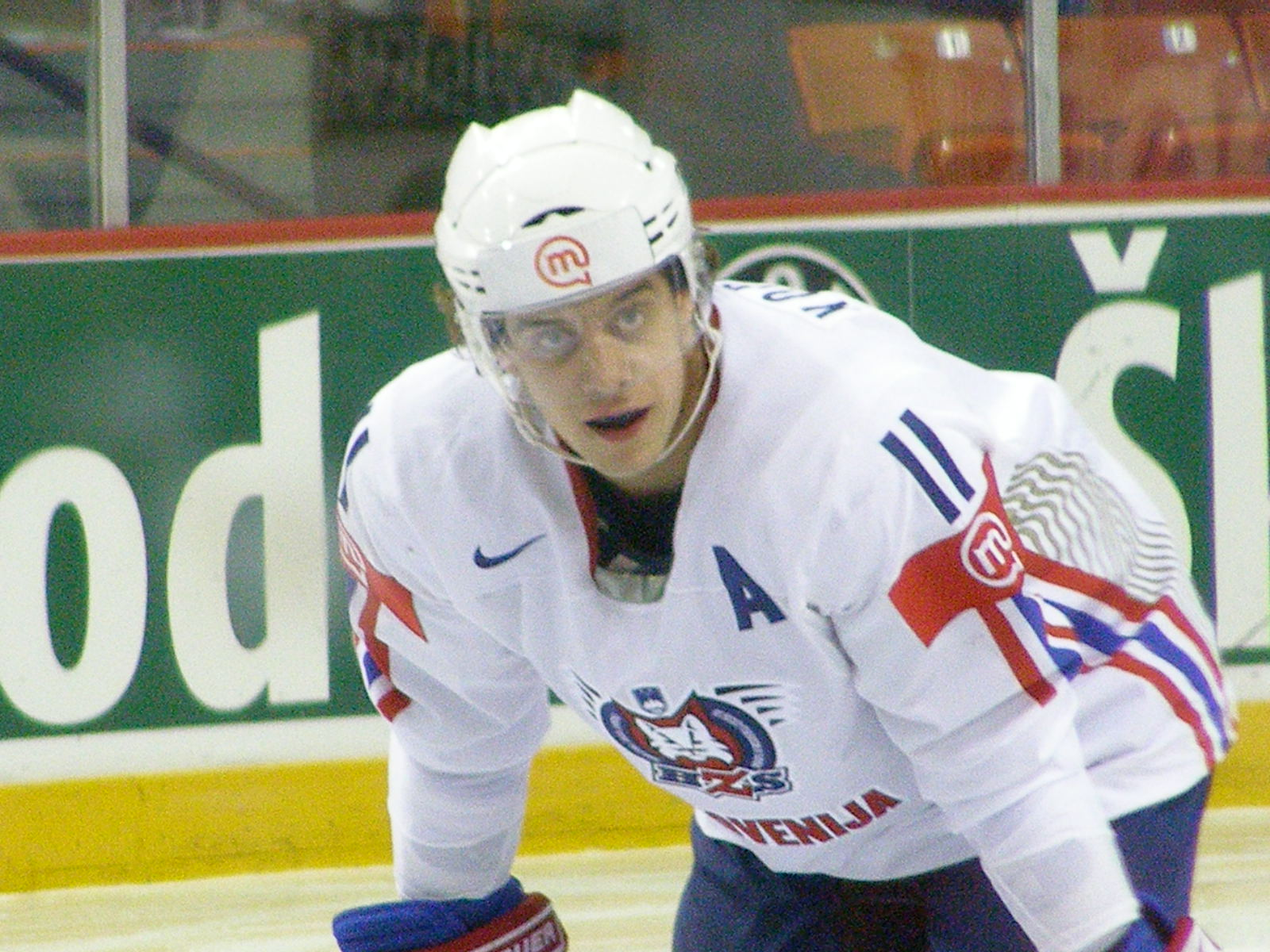
Anže Kopitar scored six goals and five assists to finish first in scoring.

List shows the top ten skaters sorted by points, then goals.

Player	GP	G	A	Pts	+/-	PIM	POS
(Slovenia) Anže Kopitar	5	6	5	11	–1	14	F
(Kazakhstan) Sergey Tron	5	3	5	8	+5	4	F
(Slovenia) Klemen Zbontar	5	3	5	8	–1	6	F
(Austria) Rafael Rotter	5	3	4	7	0	6	F
(Belarus) Sergei Kostitsyn	4	1	5	6	+5	4	F
(Austria) Michael Grabner	4	4	1	5	0	29	F
(Austria) Markus Schlacher	5	3	2	5	0	0	F
(Belarus) Alexandre Chtchourko	4	2	3	5	+6	0	F
(Slovenia) Matic Modic	5	2	3	5	–2	0	F
(Belarus) Aliaksandr Abakunchyk	4	2	3	5	+5	8	F

=== Leading goaltenders ===
Only the top five goaltenders, based on save percentage, who have at least played 40% of their team's minutes are included in this list.

Player	MIP	SOG	GA	GAA	SVS%	SO
(France) Mickael Gasnier	238:36	106	10	2.51	90.57	0
(Belarus) Dzmitry Zhurauski	236:52	106	10	2.53	90.57	0
(Slovenia) Ales Sila	298:52	127	13	2.61	89.76	0
(Kazakhstan) Sergey Khudyakov	295:10	116	12	2.44	89.66	0
(United Kingdom) Joe Dollin	164:28	98	14	5.11	85.71	0

== Group B tournament ==
The Group B tournament began on 2 April 2005 in Sosnowiec, Poland. Italy, Japan, Latvia and Poland all returned to compete in this years Division I tournament after missing promotion to the Championship Division at the previous years World Championships. Ukraine gained promotion to Division I after finishing first in last years Division II Group A tournament and Norway was relegated from the Championship Division after failing to survive the relegation round at the 2004 IIHF World U18 Championship.

Norway won the tournament after winning four of their five games, finishing first in the group standings and gained promotion back to the Championship Division for the 2006 IIHF World U18 Championships. Latvia finished second after losing only to Norway and Poland and Ukraine finished in third place. Italy finished in last place, managing only to tie two of their games and lose the other three and were relegated to Division II for the 2006 IIHF World U18 Championships. Grzegorz Pasiut of Poland finished as the top scorer of the tournament with seven points including six goals and one assist. Norway's Lars Simon Paulgaard finished as the tournaments leading goaltender with a save percentage of 92.50.

=== Standings ===
Pos	Team	Pld	W	D	L	GF	GA	GD	Pts	Promotion or relegation
1	Norway	5	4	0	1	18	10	+8	8	Promoted to the Championship Division for 2006
2	Latvia	5	3	0	2	14	13	+1	6	
3	Ukraine	5	3	0	2	16	12	+4	6	
4	Poland	5	2	1	2	15	20	−5	5	
5	Japan	5	1	1	3	12	17	−5	3	
6	Italy	5	0	2	3	14	17	−3	2	Relegated to Division II for 2006

=== Fixtures ===
All times local.

2 April 2005; 13:00	Latvia	3 – 2 (0–1, 3–1, 0–0)	Japan	Winter Stadium; Attendance: 100

Game reference

2 April 2005; 16:30	Ukraine	5 – 1 (2–0, 2–0, 1–1)	Norway	Winter Stadium

Game reference

2 April 2005; 20:00	Poland	3 – 3 (1–1, 0–0, 2–2)	Italy	Winter Stadium; Attendance: 700

Game reference

3 April 2005; 13:00	Norway	2 – 1 (0–1, 1–0, 1–0)	Latvia	Winter Stadium; Attendance: 100

Game reference

3 April 2005; 16:30	Italy	3 – 4 (1–1, 2–0, 0–3)	Ukraine	Winter Stadium; Attendance: 150

Game reference

3 April 2005; 20:00	Japan	4 – 6 (1–3, 1–2, 2–1)	Poland	Winter Stadium

Game reference

5 April 2005; 13:00	Japan	2 – 2 (0–0, 1–1, 1–1)	Italy	Winter Stadium

Game reference

5 April 2005; 16:30	Ukraine	2 – 3 (2–0, 0–3, 0–0)	Latvia	Winter Stadium; Attendance: 150

Game reference

5 April 2005; 20:00	Norway	7 – 0 (4–0, 1–0, 2–0)	Poland	Winter Stadium; Attendance: 500

Game reference

6 April 2005; 13:00	Japan	2 – 1 (0–0, 2–0, 0–1)	Ukraine	Winter Stadium; Attendance: 150

Game reference

6 April 2005; 16:30	Italy	2 – 3 (0–1, 0–0, 2–2)	Norway	Winter Stadium; Attendance: 200

Game reference

6 April 2005; 20:00	Latvia	2 – 3 (2–0, 0–2, 0–1)	Poland	Winter Stadium

Game reference

7 April 2005; 13:00	Norway	5 – 2 (0–1, 4–0, 1–1)	Japan	Winter Stadium

Game reference

7 April 2005; 16:30	Italy	4 – 5 (2–1, 2–1, 0–3)	Latvia	Winter Stadium; Attendance: 100

Game reference

7 April 2005; 20:00	Poland	3 – 4 (0–0, 1–1, 2–3)	Ukraine	Winter Stadium; Attendance: 1000

Game reference

=== Scoring leaders ===
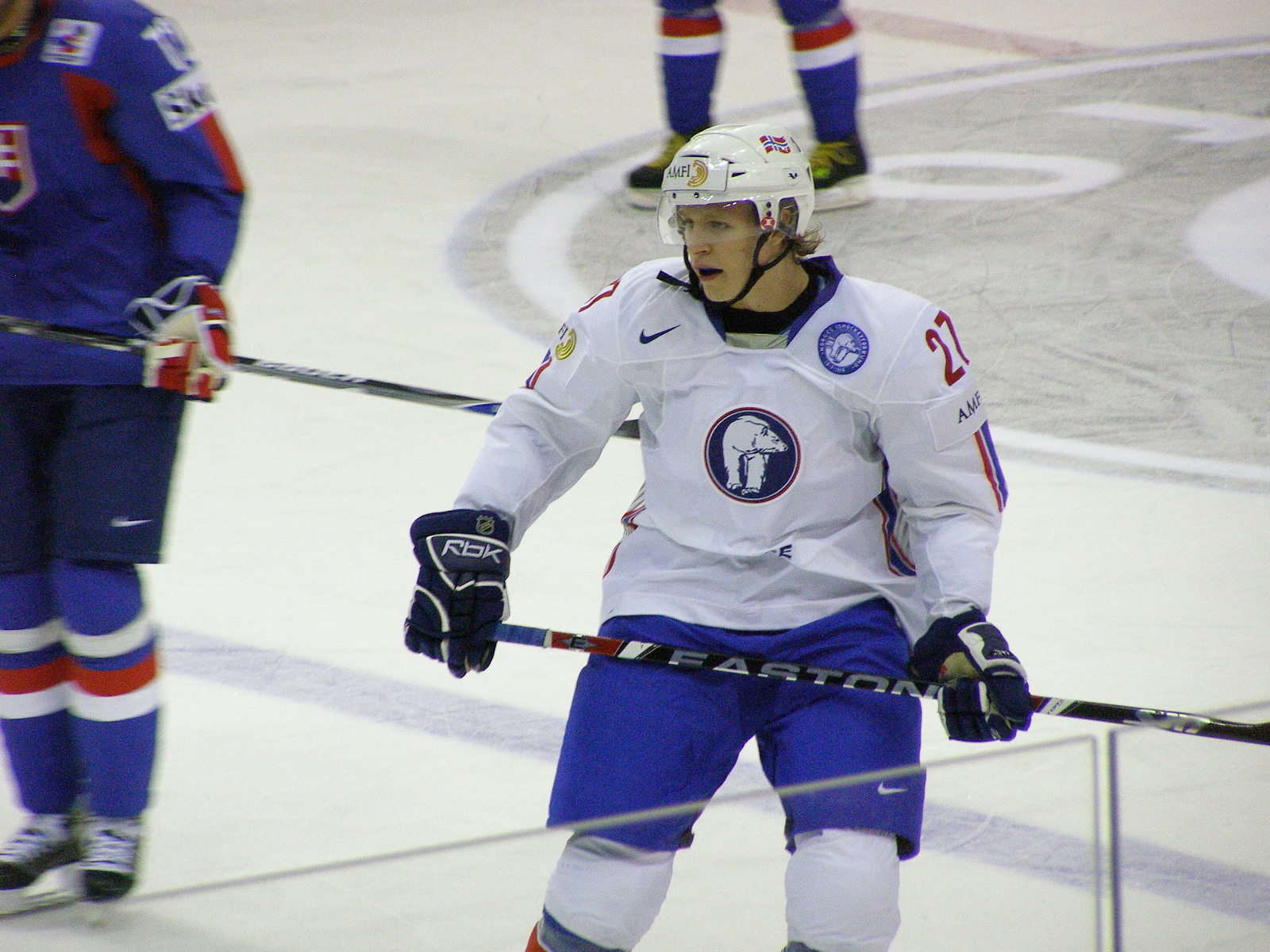
Mats Frøshaug finished seventh in scoring after recording three goals and one assist.

List shows the top ten skaters sorted by points, then goals.

Player	GP	G	A	Pts	+/-	PIM	POS
(Poland) Grzegorz Pasiut	5	6	1	7	0	4	F
(Ukraine) Fillip Ogleznev	5	2	3	5	+2	4	D
(Norway) Mats Aasen	5	2	3	5	+1	6	F
(Japan) Ryosuke Kaneko	5	1	4	5	-4	6	F
(Ukraine) Yegor Yegorov	5	4	0	4	+1	2	F
(Japan) Shuhei Kuji	5	3	1	4	-2	0	F
(Norway) Mats Frøshaug	5	3	1	4	+2	2	F
(Norway) Jonas Holøs	5	3	1	4	+1	14	D
(Ukraine) Pavlo Borysenko	5	2	2	4	+4	2	F
(Poland) Bartlomiej Bomba	5	2	2	4	+1	4	F

=== Leading goaltenders ===
Only the top five goaltenders, based on save percentage, who have played 40% of their team's minutes are included in this list.

Player	MIP	SOG	GA	GAA	SVS%	SO
(Norway) Lars Simom Paulgaard	259:59	80	6	1.38	92.50	1
(Japan) Ryohsuke Ohshima	291:54	126	14	2.88	88.89	0
(Latvia) Kristaps Stigis	220:00	81	9	2.45	88.89	0
(Ukraine) Sergei Sorocolat	300:00	106	12	2.40	88.68	0
(Poland) Kamil Kosowski	254:01	122	15	3.54	87.70	0
