= Darren Dietz =

Canadian-Kazakhstani ice hockey player

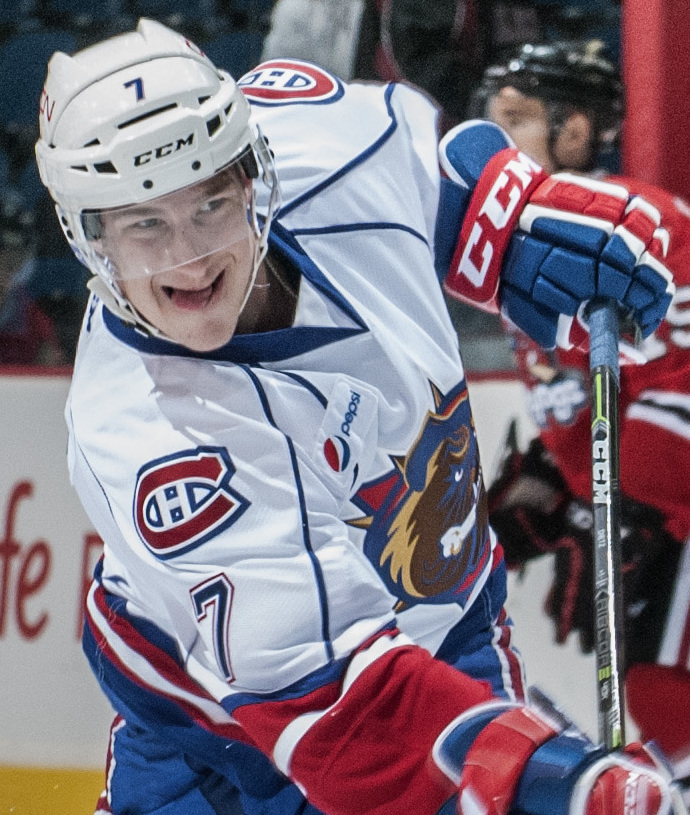
- Dietz with the Hamilton Bulldogs in 2014
- Born: July 17, 1993 (age 33) Medicine Hat, Alberta, Canada
- Height: 6 ft 2 in (188 cm)
- Weight: 209 lb (95 kg; 14 st 13 lb)
- Position: Defence
- Shoots: Right
- KHL team Former teams: Sibir Novosibirsk; Montreal Canadiens; Barys Astana; CSKA Moscow; Avangard Omsk; Avtomobilist Yekaterinburg; Dinamo Minsk
- National team: Kazakhstan
- NHL draft: 138th overall, 2011; Montreal Canadiens
- Playing career: 2013–present

Darren Dietz (Kazakh: Даррен Диц; born July 17, 1993) is a Canadian-Kazakhstani professional ice hockey defenceman currently playing for Sibir Novosibirsk of the Kontinental Hockey League (KHL). He was selected in the fifth round, 138th overall, by the Montreal Canadiens in the 2011 NHL entry draft.

== Playing career ==
Dietz played in the WHL since the 2009–10 season with the Saskatoon Blades. He was named to the 2013 WHL East First All-Star Team.

On September 16, 2013, after attending the Montreal Canadiens' pre-season training camp, Dietz was assigned to the Hamilton Bulldogs of the American Hockey League.

Montreal did not offer Dietz a contract after the 2015-16 season, making him a free agent. On July 1, 2016, Dietz agreed to a one-year, two-way contract with the Washington Capitals. In the 2016–17 season, Dietz was assigned to the Hershey Bears, collecting 6 goals and 12 points in 39 contests. On March 8, 2017, Dietz was loaned by the Capitals to fellow AHL outfit, the Texas Stars, in exchange for Mattias Bäckman. He contributed with 2 assists in 13 games with the Stars to end the season. On June 26, 2017, the Capitals announced that Dietz would not be offered a new contract as a restricted free agent.

With no NHL prospects, Dietz signed a one-year deal with Kazakh club, Barys Astana of the KHL on July 1, 2017.

During the 2021–22 season, in his fifth season captaining Barys Nur-Sultan, Dietz's tenure in Kazakhstan ended after posting 21 points through 34 regular season games, when he was traded to HC CSKA Moscow in exchange for financial compensation on December 17, 2021.

Dietz played for CSKA for three seasons before departing via a trade in exchange for financial compensation with Avangard Omsk on 2 May 2024. Then he signed a two-year contract extension starting in the 2024–25 season.

== Career statistics ==
=== Regular season and playoffs ===
			Regular season					Playoffs
Season	Team	League	GP	G	A	Pts	PIM	GP	G	A	Pts	PIM
2008–09	Medicine Hat Tigers	AMHL	34	0	4	4	62	—	—	—	—	—
2009–10	Lethbridge Hurricanes	AMHL	33	9	15	24	105	5	4	3	7	14
2009–10	Saskatoon Blades	WHL	8	1	1	2	4	3	0	0	0	2
2010–11	Saskatoon Blades	WHL	68	8	19	27	66	—	—	—	—	—
2011–12	Saskatoon Blades	WHL	72	15	29	44	118	3	0	1	1	5
2012–13	Saskatoon Blades	WHL	72	24	34	58	100	4	1	1	2	2
2013–14	Hamilton Bulldogs	AHL	34	0	5	5	49	—	—	—	—	—
2014–15	Hamilton Bulldogs	AHL	71	4	13	17	64	—	—	—	—	—
2015–16	St. John's IceCaps	AHL	61	4	12	16	61	—	—	—	—	—
2015–16	Montreal Canadiens	NHL	13	1	4	5	13	—	—	—	—	—
2016–17	Hershey Bears	AHL	39	6	6	12	53	—	—	—	—	—
2016–17	Texas Stars	AHL	13	0	2	2	8	—	—	—	—	—
2017–18	Barys Astana	KHL	44	7	12	19	51	—	—	—	—	—
2018–19	Barys Astana	KHL	62	15	38	53	59	11	3	1	4	45
2019–20	Barys Nur-Sultan	KHL	54	11	21	32	65	5	3	0	3	2
2020–21	Barys Nur-Sultan	KHL	53	17	20	37	69	6	2	3	5	8
2021–22	Barys Nur-Sultan	KHL	34	9	12	21	31	—	—	—	—	—
2021–22	CSKA Moscow	KHL	8	1	1	2	2	20	1	3	4	8
2022–23	CSKA Moscow	KHL	44	5	10	15	33	27	4	7	11	18
2023–24	CSKA Moscow	KHL	55	8	14	22	35	5	1	0	1	5
2024–25	Avangard Omsk	KHL	18	1	3	4	14	—	—	—	—	—
2024–25	Avtomobilist Yekaterinburg	KHL	31	0	8	8	18	7	0	2	2	2
2025–26	Dinamo Minsk	KHL	56	5	18	23	29	8	1	0	1	6
NHL totals			13	1	4	5	13	—	—	—	—	—
KHL totals			459	79	157	236	406	89	15	16	31	94

=== International ===
Year	Team	Event	Result	GP	G	A	Pts	PIM
2019	Kazakhstan	WC-D1	17th	5	1	4	5	2
2020	Kazakhstan	OGQ	DNQ	3	2	3	5	0
2021	Kazakhstan	WC	10th	7	0	2	2	4
2022	Kazakhstan	WC	14th	3	0	2	2	0
Senior totals				18	3	11	14	6

== Awards and honours ==
Award	Year
WHL
First All-Star Team	2013
KHL
All-Star Game	2019, 2020
First All-Star Team	2019
Best Defenseman	2019
Gagarin Cup (CSKA Moscow)	2022, 2023
