= 2016–17 IIHF Continental Cup =

2016–2017 IIHF Continental Cup
- For the 2016–17 competition the IIHF released an anniversary logo to celebrate 20 years of the Continental Cup.

Tournament details
- Dates: 30 September 2016 – 15 January 2017
- Teams: 17

Final positions
- Champions: (United Kingdom) Nottingham Panthers (1st title)
- Runners-up: (Kazakhstan) Beibarys Atyrau
- Third place: (Denmark) Odense Bulldogs
- Fourth place: (Italy) Ritten Sport

The 2016–17 Continental Cup was the 20th edition of the IIHF Continental Cup, Europe's second-tier ice hockey club competition organised by International Ice Hockey Federation. The season started on 30 September 2016 and the final tournament was played on 13–15 January 2017.

== Qualified teams ==
Location of teams for the 2016–17 IIHF Continental Cup

Team	Qualification
Enter in the third round
(Denmark) Odense Bulldogs	2015–16 Metal Cup winners
(Kazakhstan) Beibarys Atyrau	2015–16 Kazakhstan Hockey Championship winners
(Italy) Ritten Sport	2015–16 Serie A winners
(Belarus) Shakhtyor Soligorsk	2015–16 Belarusian Extraliga runners-up
(France) Ducs d'Angers	2015–16 Ligue Magnus runners-up
(Ukraine) HC Donbass	2015–16 Ukrainian Extra League winners
Enter in the second round
(Latvia) HK Liepāja	2015–16 Latvian Hockey Higher League winners
(Slovenia) Acroni Jesenice	2015–16 Slovenian Ice Hockey League runners-up
(Hungary) DVTK Jegesmedvék	2015–16 MOL Liga winners
(Spain) CH Jaca	2015–16 Liga Nacional de Hockey Hielo winners
(United Kingdom) Nottingham Panthers	2015–16 Elite League Play-Off winners
(Poland) GKS Tychy	2015–16 Polska Hokej Liga runners-up
(Romania) Dunărea Galați	2015–16 Romanian Hockey League winners
Enter in the first round
(Serbia) Partizan Belgrade	2015–16 Serbian Hockey League winners
(Israel) HC Bat Yam	2015–16 Israeli Hockey League winners
(Bulgaria) Irbis-Skate Sofia	2015–16 Bulgarian Hockey League winners
(Turkey) Zeytinburnu Belediyespor	2015–16 Turkish Ice Hockey Super League winners

== First round ==
=== Group A ===
The Group A tournament was played in Sofia, Bulgaria from 30 September – 2 October 2016 with all games held at the Winter Sports Palace. Zeytinburnu Belediyespor won the tournament, the first time for a Turkish team, and advanced to Group B in the Second round.

Pos	Team	Pld	W	OTW	OTL	L	GF	GA	GD	Pts	Qualification
1	(Turkey) Zeytinburnu Belediyespor	3	3	0	0	0	32	6	+26	9	Advance to Second round
2	(Serbia) Partizan Belgrade	3	2	0	0	1	12	14	−2	6	
3	(Bulgaria) Irbis-Skate Sofia	3	1	0	0	2	9	13	−4	3	
4	(Israel) HC Bat Yam	3	0	0	0	3	10	30	−20	0	

Source: IIHF.com

All times are local. (EEST – UTC+3)

30 September 2016; 16:00	Partizan Belgrade (Serbia)	5 – 4 (2–2, 0–1, 3–1)	(Israel) HC Bat Yam	Winter Sports Palace

Game reference
36 min	Penalties	22 min
51	Shots	23

30 September 2016; 20:15	Zeytinburnu Belediyespor (Turkey)	5 – 1 (1–0, 0–1, 4–0)	(Bulgaria) Irbis-Skate Sofia	Winter Sports Palace

Game reference
31 min	Penalties	59 min
39	Shots	28

1 October 2016; 13:30	Partizan Belgrade (Serbia)	3 – 8 (1–3, 2–0, 0–5)	(Turkey) Zeytinburnu Belediyespor	Winter Sports Palace

Game reference
30 min	Penalties	30 min
30	Shots	32

1 October 2016; 17:00	Irbis-Skate Sofia (Bulgaria)	6 – 4 (2–0, 1–2, 3–2)	(Israel) HC Bat Yam	Winter Sports Palace

Game reference
20 min	Penalties	14 min
51	Shots	31

2 October 2016; 13:00	HC Bat Yam (Israel)	2 – 19 (0–5, 1–6, 1–8)	(Turkey) Zeytinburnu Belediyespor	Winter Sports Palace

Game reference
28 min	Penalties	22 min
10	Shots	49

2 October 2016; 17:00	Irbis-Skate Sofia (Bulgaria)	2 – 4 (1–2, 1–1, 0–1)	(Serbia) Partizan Belgrade	Winter Sports Palace

Game reference
20 min	Penalties	26 min
32	Shots	31

== Second round ==
=== Group B ===
The Group B tournament was played in Jaca, Spain from 21 to 23 October 2016 with all games held at the Pabellón de Hielo.

Pos	Team	Pld	W	OTW	OTL	L	GF	GA	GD	Pts	Qualification
1	(United Kingdom) Nottingham Panthers	3	3	0	0	0	28	4	+24	9	Advance to Third round
2	(Latvia) HK Liepāja	3	2	0	0	1	19	6	+13	6	
3	(Turkey) Zeytinburnu Belediyespor	3	1	0	0	2	9	23	−14	3	
4	(Spain) CH Jaca	3	0	0	0	3	7	30	−23	0	

Source: IIHF.com

All times are local. (CEST – UTC+2)

21 October 2016; 16:30	HK Liepāja (Latvia)	8 – 1 (1–0, 4–1, 3–0)	(Turkey) Zeytinburnu Belediyespor	Pabellón de Hielo

Game reference
8 min	Penalties	26 min
67	Shots	13

21 October 2016; 20:00	CH Jaca (Spain)	2 – 13 (2–6, 0–5, 0–2)	(United Kingdom) Nottingham Panthers	Pabellón de Hielo

Game reference
14 min	Penalties	8 min
21	Shots	52

22 October 2016; 16:30	Nottingham Panthers (United Kingdom)	12 – 1 (3–0, 5–0, 4–1)	(Turkey) Zeytinburnu Belediyespor	Pabellón de Hielo

Game reference
16 min	Penalties	20 min
80	Shots	16

22 October 2016; 20:00	HK Liepāja (Latvia)	10 – 2 (2–1, 4–0, 4–1)	(Spain) CH Jaca	Pabellón de Hielo

Game reference
12 min	Penalties	18 min
47	Shots	14

23 October 2016; 16:30	Nottingham Panthers (United Kingdom)	3 – 1 (2–1, 1–0, 0–0)	(Latvia) HK Liepāja	Pabellón de Hielo

Game reference
12 min	Penalties	12 min
29	Shots	38

23 October 2016; 20:00	Zeytinburnu Belediyespor (Turkey)	7 – 3 (1–1, 3–2, 3–0)	(Spain) CH Jaca	Pabellón de Hielo

Game reference
76 min	Penalties	51 min
24	Shots	37

=== Group C ===
The Group C tournament was played in Tychy, Poland from 21 to 23 October 2016 with all games held at the Winter Stadium.

Pos	Team	Pld	W	OTW	OTL	L	GF	GA	GD	Pts	Qualification
1	(Poland) GKS Tychy	3	2	0	1	0	18	4	+14	7	Advance to Third round
2	(Hungary) DVTK Jegesmedvék	3	2	0	0	1	11	7	+4	6	
3	(Slovenia) Acroni Jesenice	3	0	2	0	1	6	7	−1	4	
4	(Romania) Dunărea Galați	3	0	0	1	2	3	20	−17	1	

Source: IIHF.com

All times are local. (CEST – UTC+2)

21 October 2016; 15:30	DVTK Jegesmedvék (Hungary)	4 – 1 (0–1, 2–0, 2–0)	(Slovenia) Acroni Jesenice	Winter Stadium

Game reference
14 min	Penalties	33 min
32	Shots	16

21 October 2016; 19:00	Dunărea Galați (Romania)	0 – 12 (0–3, 0–2, 0–7)	(Poland) GKS Tychy	Winter Stadium

Game reference
14 min	Penalties	2 min
10	Shots	73

22 October 2016; 14:30	DVTK Jegesmedvék (Hungary)	5 – 1 (1–0, 1–0, 3–1)	(Romania) Dunărea Galați	Winter Stadium

Game reference
12 min	Penalties	16 min
49	Shots	27

22 October 2016; 18:00	GKS Tychy (Poland)	1 – 2 OT (0–0, 1–0, 0–1, 0–1)	(Slovenia) Acroni Jesenice	Winter Stadium

Game reference
18 min	Penalties	6 min
41	Shots	26

23 October 2016; 14:30	Acroni Jesenice (Slovenia)	3 – 2 SO (1–1, 1–1, 0–0, 0–0, 1–0)	(Romania) Dunărea Galați	Winter Stadium

Game reference
2 min	Penalties	6 min
33	Shots	34

23 October 2016; 18:00	GKS Tychy (Poland)	5 – 2 (2–1, 0–1, 3–0)	(Hungary) DVTK Jegesmedvék	Winter Stadium

Game reference
12 min	Penalties	37 min
39	Shots	17

== Third round ==
=== Group D ===
The Group D tournament was played in Odense, Denmark from 18 to 20 November 2016 with all games held at the Odense Isstadion.

Pos	Team	Pld	W	OTW	OTL	L	GF	GA	GD	Pts	Qualification
1	(United Kingdom) Nottingham Panthers	3	2	0	0	1	10	10	0	6	Advance to Final round
2	(Denmark) Odense Bulldogs	3	2	0	0	1	9	8	+1	6	Advance to Final round
3	(France) Ducs d'Angers	3	1	0	0	2	8	9	−1	3	
4	(Ukraine) HC Donbass	3	1	0	0	2	6	6	0	3	

Source: IIHF.com

All times are local. (CET – UTC+1)

18 November 2016; 16:00	HC Donbass (Ukraine)	2 – 3 (1–0, 1–2, 0–1)	(France) Ducs d'Angers	Odense Isstadion

Game reference
20 min	Penalties	20 min
26	Shots	29

18 November 2016; 20:00	Odense Bulldogs (Denmark)	4 – 5 (1–2, 1–2, 2–1)	(United Kingdom) Nottingham Panthers	Odense Isstadion

Game reference
6 min	Penalties	6 min
33	Shots	34

19 November 2016; 15:00	Ducs d'Angers (France)	3 – 4 (2–1, 0–2, 1–1)	(United Kingdom) Nottingham Panthers	Odense Isstadion

Game reference
2 min	Penalties	12 min
27	Shots	20

19 November 2016; 19:00	Odense Bulldogs (Denmark)	2 – 1 (1–1, 0–0, 1–0)	(Ukraine) HC Donbass	Odense Isstadion

Game reference
10 min	Penalties	14 min
23	Shots	31

20 November 2016; 12:00	Nottingham Panthers (United Kingdom)	1 – 3 (0–0, 0–1, 1–2)	(Ukraine) HC Donbass	Odense Isstadion

Game reference
12 min	Penalties	8 min
25	Shots	37

20 November 2016; 16:00	Ducs d'Angers (France)	2 – 3 (0–1, 2–1, 0–1)	(Denmark) Odense Bulldogs	Odense Isstadion

Game reference
12 min	Penalties	10 min
27	Shots	38

=== Group E ===
The Group E tournament was played in Ritten, Italy from 18 to 20 November 2016 with all games held at the Arena Ritten.

Pos	Team	Pld	W	OTW	OTL	L	GF	GA	GD	Pts	Qualification
1	(Italy) Ritten Sport	3	3	0	0	0	10	6	+4	9	Advance to Final round
2	(Kazakhstan) Beibarys Atyrau	3	2	0	0	1	10	6	+4	6	Advance to Final round
3	(Belarus) Shakhtyor Soligorsk	3	1	0	0	2	4	7	−3	3	
4	(Poland) GKS Tychy	3	0	0	0	3	5	10	−5	0	

Source: IIHF.com

All times are local. (CET – UTC+1)

18 November 2016; 16:00	Beibarys Atyrau (Kazakhstan)	4 – 1 (1–1, 1–0, 2–0)	(Belarus) Shakhtyor Soligorsk	Arena Ritten

Game reference
4 min	Penalties	2 min
23	Shots	32

18 November 2016; 20:00	Ritten Sport (Italy)	4 – 3 (0–0, 1–0, 3–3)	(Poland) GKS Tychy	Arena Ritten

Game reference
2 min	Penalties	16 min
31	Shots	30

19 November 2016; 15:00	Shakhtyor Soligorsk (Belarus)	2 – 0 (0–0, 1–0, 1–0)	(Poland) GKS Tychy	Arena Ritten

Game reference
8 min	Penalties	4 min
16	Shots	28

19 November 2016; 19:00	Ritten Sport (Italy)	3 – 2 (0–0, 1–1, 2–1)	(Kazakhstan) Beibarys Atyrau	Arena Ritten

Game reference
6 min	Penalties	0 min
23	Shots	33

20 November 2016; 15:00	GKS Tychy (Poland)	2 – 4 (0–1, 1–1, 1–2)	(Kazakhstan) Beibarys Atyrau	Arena Ritten

Game reference
0 min	Penalties	18 min
29	Shots	37

20 November 2016; 19:00	Shakhtyor Soligorsk (Belarus)	1 – 3 (0–1, 1–1, 0–1)	(Italy) Ritten Sport	Arena Ritten

Game reference
8 min	Penalties	12 min
34	Shots	28

== Final round ==
Continental Cup Final tournament was played in Ritten, Italy from 13 to 15 January 2017 with all games held at the Arena Ritten.

Pos	Team	Pld	W	OTW	OTL	L	GF	GA	GD	Pts	Qualification
1	(United Kingdom) Nottingham Panthers	3	2	1	0	0	9	3	+6	8	Qualification to Champions Hockey League
2	(Kazakhstan) Beibarys Atyrau	3	0	1	2	0	7	8	−1	4	
3	(Denmark) Odense Bulldogs	3	1	0	1	1	6	6	0	4	
4	(Italy) Ritten Sport	3	0	1	0	2	5	10	−5	2	

Updated to match(es) played on 14 January 2017. Source: IIHF.com

All times are local. (CET – UTC+1)

13 January 2017; 16:00	Nottingham Panthers (United Kingdom)	2 – 0 (0–0, 1–0, 1–0)	(Denmark) Odense Bulldogs	Arena Ritten

Game reference
4 min	Penalties	6 min
32	Shots	29

13 January 2017; 20:00	Beibarys Atyrau (Kazakhstan)	2 – 3 SO (1–2, 0–0, 1–0, 0–0, 0–1)	(Italy) Ritten Sport	Arena Ritten

Game reference
10 min	Penalties	10 min
31	Shots	27

14 January 2017; 15:00	Nottingham Panthers (United Kingdom)	3 – 2 SO (1–1, 0–0, 1–1, 0–0, 1–0)	(Kazakhstan) Beibarys Atyrau	Arena Ritten

Game reference
12 min	Penalties	12 min
34	Shots	33

14 January 2017; 19:00	Ritten Sport (Italy)	1 – 4 (0–1, 0–1, 1–2)	(Denmark) Odense Bulldogs	Arena Ritten

Game reference
30 min	Penalties	12 min
37	Shots	27

15 January 2017; 15:00	Odense Bulldogs (Denmark)	2 – 3 OT (1–0, 1–1, 0–1, 0–1)	(Kazakhstan) Beibarys Atyrau	Arena Ritten

Game reference

15 January 2017; 19:00	Ritten Sport (Italy)	1 – 4 (0–1, 1–2, 0–1)	(United Kingdom) Nottingham Panthers	Arena Ritten

Game reference

== See also ==
- 2016–17 Champions Hockey League
