= 2004 IIHF World U18 Championship Division II =

Tournament details
- Host countries: Hungary; Lithuania
- Dates: 1 – 7 March 2004; 28 March – 3 April 2004
- Teams: 12

The 2004 IIHF World U18 Championship Division II was a pair of international under-18 ice hockey tournaments run by the International Ice Hockey Federation. The Division II tournaments made up the third level of competition at the 2004 IIHF World U18 Championships. The Group A tournament took place between 28 March and 3 April 2004 in Debrecen, Hungary and the Group B tournament took place between 1 and 7 March 2004 in Elektrėnai and Kaunas, Lithuania. Ukraine and Great Britain won the Group A and Group B tournaments respectively and gained promotion to Division I for the 2005 IIHF World U18 Championships. While Belgium finished last in Group A and Australia last in Group B and were both relegated to Division III for 2005.

== Group A tournament ==
The Group A tournament began on 28 March 2004 in Debrecen, Hungary. Belgium, Hungary, the Netherlands and Spain returned to compete in the Division II competition after missing promotion at the previous years World Championships. Ukraine entered the Division II competition after being relegated from Division I and Iceland entered the tournament after gaining promotion from Division III at the 2003 IIHF World U18 Championships. Ukraine won the tournament after winning all five of their games and gained promotion back to Division I for the 2005 IIHF World U18 Championships. Hungary finished in second place and the Netherlands finished in third. Belgium finished in last place after losing four of their five games and were relegated to Division III for the 2005 IIHF World U18 Championships. Yegor Yegorov of Ukraine finished as the top scorer of the tournament with 18 points including six goals and 12 assists. Martijn Maghielse of the Netherlands finished as the tournaments leading goaltender with a save percentage of 88.46.

=== Standings ===
Pos	Team	Pld	W	D	L	GF	GA	GD	Pts	Promotion or relegation
1	Ukraine	5	5	0	0	62	7	+55	10	Promoted to Division I for 2005
2	Hungary	5	3	1	1	41	18	+23	7	
3	Netherlands	5	3	1	1	41	24	+17	7	
4	Spain	5	1	1	3	21	36	−15	3	
5	Iceland	5	1	0	4	14	57	−43	2	
6	Belgium	5	0	1	4	12	49	−37	1	Relegated to Division III for 2005

Source: IIHF

=== Fixtures ===
All times local.

28 March 2004; 12:30	Iceland	0 – 21 (0–8, 0–7, 0–6)	Ukraine	Debrecen; Attendance: 100

Game reference

28 March 2004; 15:30	Spain	6 – 9 (3–3, 1–3, 2–3)	Netherlands	Debrecen; Attendance: 500

Game reference

28 March 2004; 18:30	Belgium	3 – 13 (1–4, 1–5, 1–4)	Hungary	Debrecen; Attendance: 1200

Game reference

29 March 2004; 12:30	Netherlands	11 – 1 (6–0, 1–0, 4–1)	Iceland	Debrecen; Attendance: 100

Game reference

29 March 2004; 15:30	Ukraine	14 – 2 (4–1, 3–0, 7–1)	Belgium	Debrecen; Attendance: 300

Game reference

29 March 2004; 18:30	Hungary	8 – 1 (1–1, 2–0, 5–0)	Spain	Debrecen; Attendance: 1200

Game reference

31 March 2004; 12:30	Ukraine	11 – 2 (3–1, 5–1, 3–0)	Spain	Debrecen; Attendance: 300

Game reference

31 March 2004; 15:30	Iceland	4 – 3 (2–1, 1–0, 1–2)	Belgium	Debrecen; Attendance: 300

Game reference

31 March 2004; 18:30	Hungary	5 – 5 (1–0, 2–3, 2–2)	Netherlands	Debrecen; Attendance: 3000

Game reference

12:30; 2 April 2004	Belgium	3 – 3 (2–0, 0–2, 1–1)	Spain	Debrecen; Attendance: 350

Game reference

2 April 2004; 15:30	Netherlands	1 – 11 (0–4, 1–2, 0–5)	Ukraine	Debrecen; Attendance: 520

Game reference

2 April 2004; 18:30	Hungary	13 – 4 (4–2, 3–2, 6–0)	Iceland	Debrecen; Attendance: 2950

Game reference

3 April 2004; 12:30	Netherlands	15 – 1 (9–0, 3–1, 3–0)	Belgium	Debrecen; Attendance: 230

Game reference

3 April 2004; 15:30	Spain	9 – 5 (2–4, 4–1, 3–0)	Iceland	Debrecen; Attendance: 550

Game reference

3 April 2004; 18:30	Ukraine	5 – 2 (3–0, 1–1, 1–1)	Hungary	Debrecen; Attendance: 5200

Game reference

=== Scoring leaders ===
List shows the top ten ranked skaters sorted by points, then goals.

Player	GP	G	A	Pts	+/-	PIM	POS
(Ukraine) Yegor Yegorov	5	6	12	18	+13	0	F
(Ukraine) Pavlo Borysenko	5	11	4	15	+19	4	F
(Netherlands) Akim Ramoul	5	9	5	14	+4	38	F
(Hungary) Patrik Szajbert	5	6	8	14	+6	10	F
(Ukraine) Oleksei Voytsekhovsky	5	9	4	13	+21	6	F
(Hungary) Balint Fekti	5	5	6	11	+5	8	F
(Netherlands) Alan van Bentem	5	9	1	10	+9	37	F
(Spain) Desiderio Perez	5	7	3	10	–3	10	F
(Netherlands) Kevin Bruijsten	5	6	4	10	+9	4	F
(Ukraine) Roman Krivda	5	6	4	10	+6	0	F
(Ukraine) Ivan Oliynyk	5	6	4	10	+8	6	F

=== Leading goaltenders ===
Only the top five goaltenders, based on save percentage, who have played 40% of their team's minutes are included in this list.

Player	MIP	SOG	GA	GAA	SVS%	SO
(Netherlands) Martijn Maghielse	287:52	182	21	4.38	88.46	0
(Hungary) Zoltan Hetenyi	180:00	64	9	3.00	85.94	0
(Ukraine) Oleksandr Sokolenko	160:00	22	4	1.50	81.82	1
(Spain) Aaron Carretero	210:33	133	26	7.41	80.45	0
(Belgium) Kevin van Looveren	219:49	179	38	10.37	78.77	0

== Group B tournament ==
The Group B tournament began on 1 March 2004 in Elektrėnai and Kaunas, Lithuania. Croatia, Estonia and Lithuania all returned to compete in the Division II tournament after missing promotion to Division I at the previous years World Championship. Great Britain entered the Division II competition after being relegated from Division I and Australia entered the tournament after gaining promotion from Division III at the 2003 IIHF World U18 Championships. The Serbia and Montenegro men's national under-18 ice hockey team made their debut at the World Championships after replacing the Yugoslavia men's national under-18 ice hockey team, the change in team coinciding with the Federal Republic of Yugoslavia being reconstituted as the State Union of Serbia and Montenegro. Great Britain won the tournament after winning all five of their games and gained promotion back to Division I for the 2005 IIHF World U18 Championships. Estonia finished second after losing only to Great Britain and Croatia finished in third place. Australia finished in last place after losing four of their five games and drawing the fifth and were relegated back to Division III for the 2005 IIHF World U18 Championships. Thomas Carlon of Great Britain finished as the top scorer of the tournament with 14 points including ten goals and four assists.

=== Standings ===
Pos	Team	Pld	W	D	L	GF	GA	GD	Pts	Promotion or relegation
1	Great Britain	5	5	0	0	30	6	+24	10	Promoted to Division I for 2005
2	Estonia	5	4	0	1	35	6	+29	8	
3	Croatia	5	3	0	2	17	14	+3	6	
4	Lithuania	5	1	1	3	10	15	−5	3	
5	Serbia and Montenegro	5	1	0	4	12	26	−14	2	
6	Australia	5	0	1	4	5	42	−37	1	Relegated to Division III for 2005

=== Fixtures ===
All times local.

1 March 2004; 15:00	Australia	0 – 14 (0–5, 0–3, 0–6)	Great Britain	Elektrėnai

Game reference

1 March 2004; 17:00	Serbia and Montenegro	0 – 10 (0–3, 0–5, 0–2)	Estonia	Kaunas; Attendance: 300

Game reference

1 March 2004; 18:30	Lithuania	1 – 4 (1–3, 0–0, 0–1)	Croatia	Elektrėnai; Attendance: 1770

Game reference

2 March 2004; 15:00	Great Britain	5 – 3 (1–0, 2–1, 2–2)	Serbia and Montenegro	Elektrėnai

Game reference

2 March 2004; 17:00	Estonia	4 – 2 (2–0, 2–0, 0–2)	Lithuania	Kaunas; Attendance: 800

Game reference

2 March 2004; 18:30	Croatia	6 – 0 (1–0, 3–0, 2–0)	Australia	Elektrėnai; Attendance: 780

Game reference

4 March 2004; 15:00	Estonia	5 – 1 (1–0, 2–0, 2–1)	Croatia	Elektrėnai; Attendance: 660

Game reference

4 March 2004; 17:00	Australia	2 – 5 (0–1, 2–3, 0–1)	Serbia and Montenegro	Kaunas

Game reference

4 March 2004; 18:30	Great Britain	2 – 1 (1–0, 0–0, 1–1)	Lithuania	Elektrėnai; Attendance: 1850

Game reference

5 March 2004; 15:00	Croatia	1 – 7 (0–1, 0–4, 1–2)	Great Britain	Elektrėnai

Game reference

5 March 2004; 17:00	Estonia	15 – 1 (5–1, 3–0, 7–0)	Australia	Kaunas

Game reference

5 March 2004; 18:30	Serbia and Montenegro	3 – 4 (1–2, 1–0, 1–2)	Lithuania	Elektrėnai

Game reference

7 March 2004; 12:00	Croatia	5 – 1 (1–0, 1–1, 3–0)	Serbia and Montenegro	Elektrėnai

Game reference

7 March 2004; 15:30	Great Britain	2 – 1 (0–0, 0–0, 2–1)	Estonia	Elektrėnai; Attendance: 1600

Game reference

7 March 2004; 19:00	Lithuania	2 – 2 (2–1, 0–1, 0–0)	Australia	Elektrėnai; Attendance: 2200

Game reference

=== Scoring leaders ===
List shows the top ten ranked skaters sorted by points, then goals.

Player	GP	G	A	Pts	+/-	PIM	POS
(United Kingdom) Thomas Carlon	5	10	4	14	+11	12	F
(Estonia) Aleksandr Polozov	5	6	7	13	+8	4	F
(Estonia) Ivan Kuzmin	5	3	9	12	+13	4	F
(Estonia) Aleksandr Kaidas	5	8	3	11	+8	8	F
(Estonia) Anton Nekrassov	4	7	4	11	+10	4	F
(United Kingdom) Mark Richardson	5	2	8	10	+6	10	F
(Lithuania) Deividas Kazlauskas	5	5	2	7	-3	4	F
(Estonia) Ilja Tsegotov	5	4	3	7	+6	14	F
(Estonia) Filipp Svarogin	5	1	6	7	+10	12	D
(United Kingdom) Nicky Watt	5	6	0	6	+5	20	F
