= Dmitri Milchakov =

Belarusian ice hockey player (born 1986)

- Born: March 2, 1986 (age 40) Minsk, Belarusian SSR, Soviet Union
- Height: 6 ft 0 in (183 cm)
- Weight: 170 lb (77 kg; 12 st 2 lb)
- Position: Goaltender
- Shot: Left
- KHL team Former teams: HC Dinamo Minsk; Modo Hockey; Yunost Minsk; HK Vitebsk; HK Gomel; HK Brest; Metallurg Zhlobin; HC Plzeň; Arlan Kokshetau; AKM Novomoskovsk
- National team: Belarus
- NHL draft: Undrafted
- Playing career: 2002–2023

Dmitri Sergeyevich Milchakov (Russian: Дми́трий Серге́евич Мильчако́в; born March 2, 1986) is a Belarusian former ice hockey goaltender. During his active career, he played in several European leagues including the KHL and Czech Extraliga.

He participated at the 2008, 2012, 2013 and 2016 World Championships as member of the Belarusian national team.

At the junior level he competed at the 2005 World Junior Ice Hockey Championships in Thief River Falls, MN
