= Pavlo Borysenko =

Ukrainian-Romanian ice hockey player

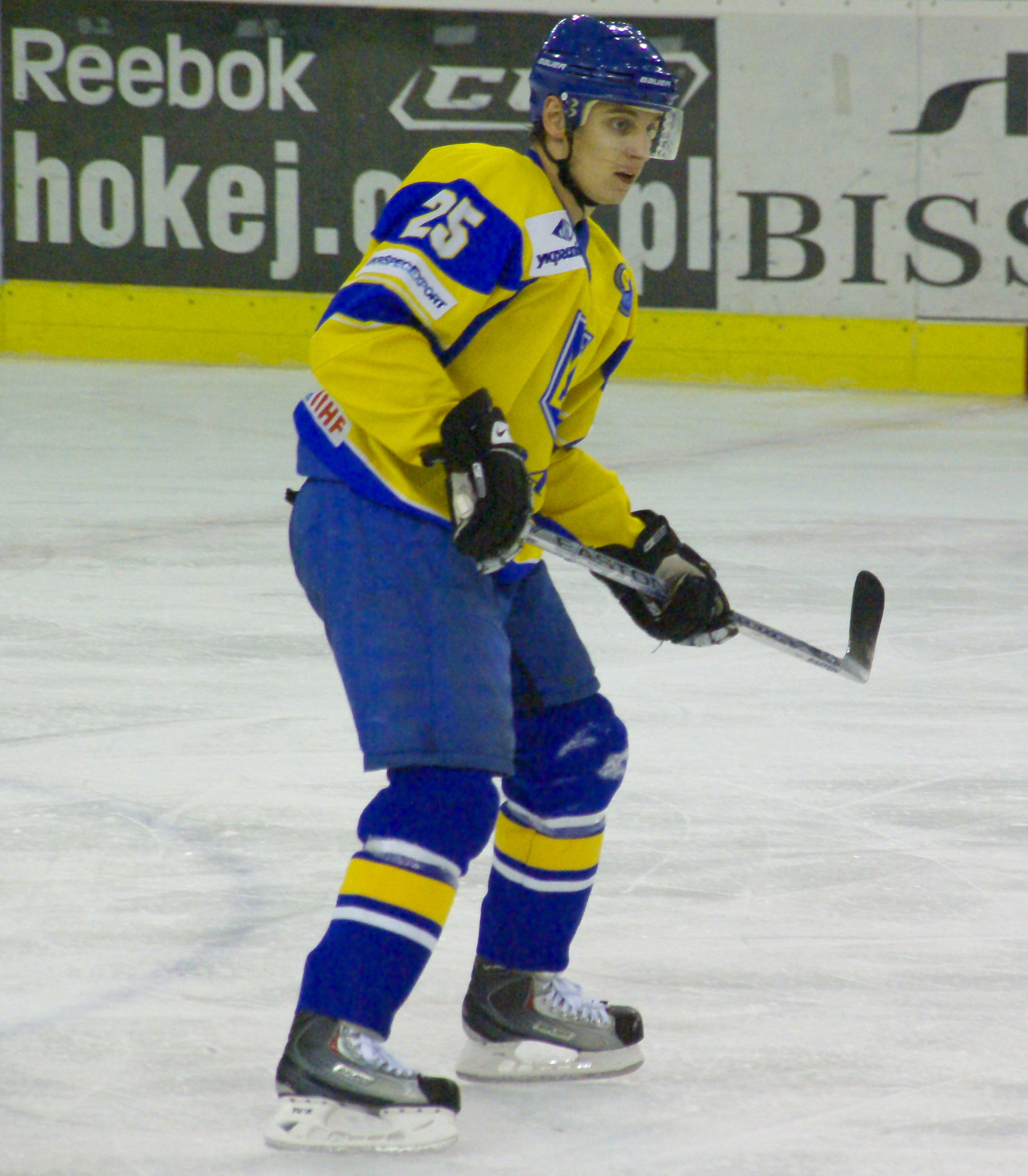
- Borysenko in 2010, while with the Ukrainian national team
- Born: 4 June 1987 (age 38) Chernihiv, USSR
- Height: 6 ft 1 in (185 cm)
- Weight: 179 lb (81 kg; 12 st 11 lb)
- Position: Left wing/Centre
- Shoots: Left
- RHL team Former teams: Steaua Rangers; HC Kompanion-Naftogaz; HC Levy; HC Berkut; Vinnytski Haidamaky; HC Donbass; Beibarys Atyrau; DHK Latgale; Liepājas Metalurgs; HK Vitebsk; Kristall Saratov; Acadie–Bathurst Titan; Bridgewater Bandits
- National team: Ukraine and Romania
- Playing career: 2005–present

Pavlo Vitaliyovich Borysenko (Ukrainian: Павло Віталійович Борисенко; born 4 June 1987) is a Ukrainian-Romanian ice hockey player.

== Playing career ==
He started out playing for Sokil Kyiv in the 2001/2002 season before moving to North America for spells in the junior leagues, first in the Eastern Junior Hockey League with the Bridgewater Bandits and then in the Quebec Major Junior Hockey League with the Acadie-Bathurst Titan. He then played in the Vysshaya Liga in Russia for Kristall Saratov and then played in the Belarusian Hockey League for HK Vitebsk before moving to Liepaja in 2006. Internationally Borysenko first played for the Ukrainian national junior team and Ukrainian national team, though he became a naturalised Romanian citizen and made his debut for the Romanian national team in 2019.

== Career statistics ==
=== International ===
Year	Team	Event	GP	G	A	Pts	PIM
2002	Ukraine U18	WJC-18	8	0	0	0	0
2003	Ukraine U18	WJC-18 (D1)	5	0	1	1	0
2004	Ukraine U18	WJC-18 (D2)	5	11	4	15	4
2005	Ukraine U18	WJC-18 (D1)	5	2	2	4	2
2005	Ukraine U20	WJC-20 (D1)	5	0	2	2	4
2006	Ukraine U20	WJC-20 (D1)	5	1	0	1	6
2007	Ukraine U20	WJC-20 (D1)	5	4	3	7	4
2019	Romania	WC (D1B)	5	2	4	6	6
2020	Romania	OGQ	6	5	7	12	0
2022	Romania	WC (D1A)	4	0	2	2	0
2023	Romania	WC (D1A)	5	0	3	3	0
Junior totals			38	18	12	30	20
Senior totals			20	7	16	23	6
