= Dmitri Shevchenko =

- Born: 15 December 1995 (age 29); Voskresensk, Russia
- Height: 1.96 m (6 ft 5 in)
- Weight: 105 kg (231 lb; 16 st 7 lb)
- Position: Centre
- Shoots: Left
- KHL team Former teams: Avangard Omsk; Dynamo Balashikha; Barys Nur-Sultan
- National team: Kazakhstan
- NHL draft: Undrafted
- Playing career: 2015–present

Dmitri Eduardovich Shevchenko (Russian: Дмитрий Эдуардович Шевченко; born 15 December 1995) is a Kazakhstani ice hockey player for Avangard Omsk and the Kazakhstani national team.

He represented Kazakhstan at the 2021 IIHF World Championship.
