= Artem Demkov =

Belarusian ice hockey player

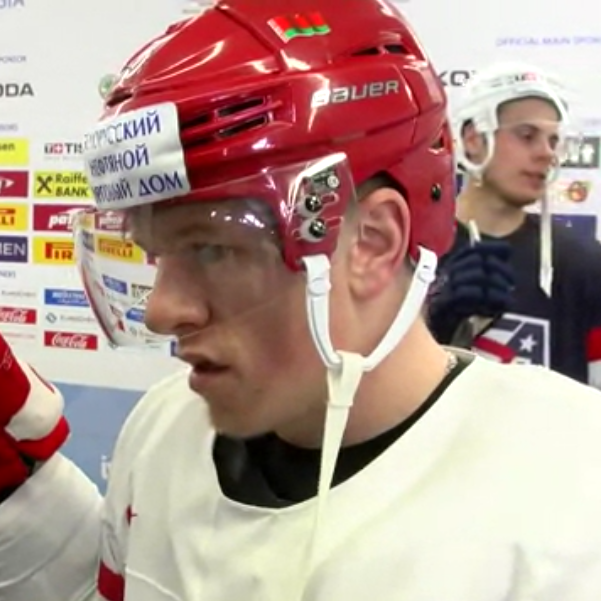
- Born: 26 September 1989 (age 35); Minsk, Byelorussian SSR , Soviet Union
- Height: 5 ft 10 in (178 cm)
- Weight: 172 lb (78 kg; 12 st 4 lb)
- Position: Forward
- Shoots: Right
- BLR team Former teams: HC Shakhter Soligorsk; Yunost Minsk; Dinamo Minsk; Hamburg Freezers; Albany Devils; HC Sochi; HKM Zvolen; Spartak Moscow
- National team: Belarus
- NHL draft: Undrafted
- Playing career: 2008–present

Artem Demkov (born 16 September 1989) is a Belarusian professional ice hockey forward who is currently playing for HC Shakhter Soligorsk in the Belarusian Extraleague (BLR).

== Playing career ==
During the 2012–13 season, he briefly moved to the Hamburg Freezers of the Deutsche Eishockey Liga on 22 January 2013, after notching 106 points in 116 games for the Elmira Jackals. He then returned to the Jackals on a one-year contract on 29 July 2013.

Demkov returned to Europe on 11 July 2014, after successfully trialling for HC Sochi of the Kontinental Hockey League. After 11 games in Sochi, Demkov returned to former club, HC Dinamo Minsk.

On 24 July 2022, Demkov left Dinamo as a free agent and was signed to a one-year contract with Russian club, HC Spartak Moscow, for the 2022–23 season. Demkov was scoreless in 22 games with Spartak before he was returned to his homeland in transferring to HC Dinamo Minsk for the remainder of the season on 27 November 2022.
