= Matic Podlipnik =

Slovenian ice hockey player

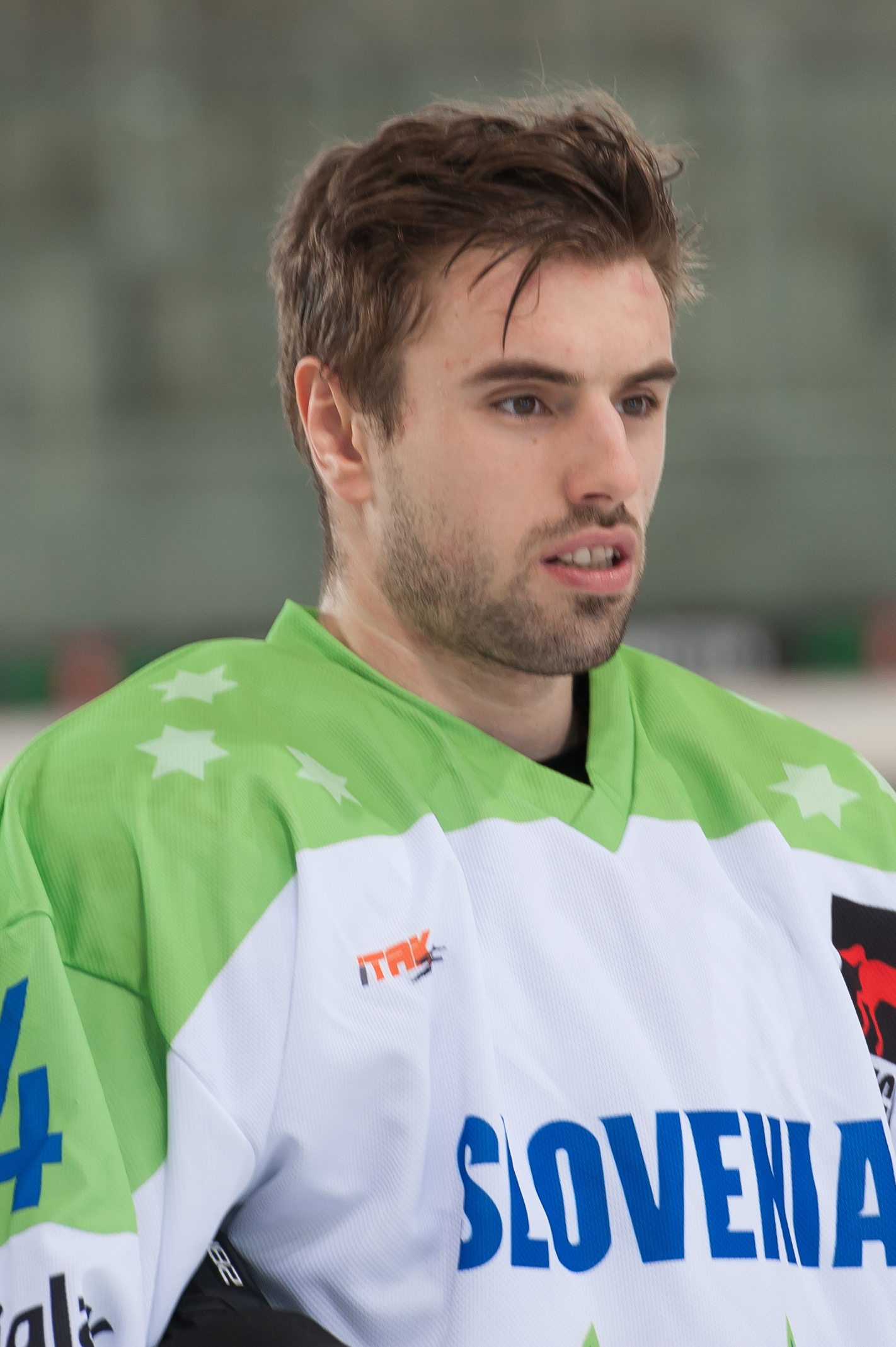
- Born: 9 August 1992 (age 34) Jesenice, Slovenia
- Height: 5 ft 11 in (180 cm)
- Weight: 181 lb (82 kg; 12 st 13 lb)
- Position: Defence
- Shoots: Left
- team Former teams: Free agent HC Dukla Jihlava; HDD Olimpija Ljubljana; HC Bolzano; SK Horácká Slavia Třebíč; Lions de Lyon; HC Energie Karlovy Vary; HC Slovan Bratislava; EV Landshut; Gyergyói HK; Jokers de Cergy-Pontoise; Bayreuth Tigers; HK Spišská Nová Ves; HK Poprad
- National team: Slovenia
- Playing career: 2012–present

Matic Podlipnik (born 9 August 1992) is a Slovenian professional ice hockey defenceman.

== Career ==
Podlipnik played for EV Landshut of DEL2 and in the EBEL with Slovenian club, HDD Olimpija Ljubljana. On 31 August 2015, he opted to continue in the EBEL by signing a month contract on trial with Italian ice hockey club HCB South Tyrol, playing in eighteen games with two assists before returning to the Czech Republic.

On 6 January 2014, Podlipnik was named to Team Slovenia's official 2014 Winter Olympics roster.

== Career statistics ==
=== Regular season and playoffs ===
			Regular season					Playoffs
Season	Team	League	GP	G	A	Pts	PIM	GP	G	A	Pts	PIM
2007–08	HD Mladi Jesenice	SVN U19	20	0	1	1	6	4	0	0	0	0
2008–09	HD Mladi Jesenice	SVN U19	28	6	14	20	12	8	3	6	9	8
2009–10	EC Red Bull Salzburg	AUT U20	23	6	14	20	16	5	1	3	4	4
2010–11	EC Salzburg II	AUT.2	25	1	5	6	30	3	0	1	1	0
2011–12	RB Hockey Juniors	AUT U20	40	11	23	34	79	—	—	—	—	—
2012–13	HC Dukla Jihlava	CZE.2	44	2	9	11	16	3	0	0	0	0
2012–13	HC Spartak Pelhřimov	CZE.3	2	0	1	1	2	3	0	0	0	0
2013–14	HC Dukla Jihlava	CZE.2	43	1	7	8	32	9	1	2	3	12
2014–15	HC Dukla Jihlava	CZE.2	19	1	8	9	12	—	—	—	—	—
2014–15	HDD Olimpija Ljubljana	AUT	29	3	8	11	12	—	—	—	—	—
2014–15	HDD Olimpija Ljubljana	SVN	1	0	0	0	0	6	3	3	6	29
2015–16	HC Bolzano	AUT	18	0	2	2	12	—	—	—	—	—
2015–16	SK Horácká Slavia Třebíč	CZE.2	15	6	4	10	14	—	—	—	—	—
2016–17	LHC Les Lions	FRA	37	8	23	31	28	5	0	1	1	8
2017–18	HC Energie Karlovy Vary	CZE.2	41	11	19	30	16	8	1	6	7	0
2018–19	HC Energie Karlovy Vary	ELH	33	1	3	4	14	—	—	—	—	—
2019–20	HC Slovan Bratislava	SVK	26	0	7	7	10	—	—	—	—	—
2019–20	EV Landshut	GER.2	5	0	0	0	2	—	—	—	—	—
2020–21	CS Progym Gheorgheni	EL	20	3	9	12	16	3	0	0	0
2020–21	CS Progym Gheorgheni	ROU	8	2	3	5	10	—	—	—	—	—
2021–22	Jokers de Cergy–Pontoise	FRA	8	1	3	4	12	—	—	—	—	—
2021–22	Bayreuth Tigers	GER.2	13	1	2	3	10	—	—	—	—	—
2021–22	HK Spišská Nová Ves	SVK	12	1	3	4	8	3	1	0	1	2
2022–23	HK Spišská Nová Ves	SVK	5	0	2	2	4	—	—	—	—	—
2022–23	HK Poprad	SVK	12	0	3	3	8	1	0	0	0	0
ELH totals			33	1	3	4	14	—	—	—	—	—

=== International ===
Year	Team	Event	GP	G	A	Pts	PIM
2009	Slovenia	WJC18 D2	5	1	1	2	4
2010	Slovenia	WJC18 D2	5	2	7	9	6
2011	Slovenia	WJC D1	5	0	4	4	2
2012	Slovenia	WJC D1A	5	0	2	2	4
2014	Slovenia	OG	5	0	0	0	0
2014	Slovenia	WC D1A	5	0	1	1	0
2017	Slovenia	WC	7	0	1	1	2
2018	Slovenia	OG	4	0	0	0	0
2018	Slovenia	WC D1A	5	1	2	3	0
2019	Slovenia	WC D1A	5	1	2	3	2
2021	Slovenia	OGQ	3	0	0	0	0
2022	Slovenia	WC D1A	4	0	2	2	0
2023	Slovenia	WC	4	0	0	0	0
2024	Slovenia	WC D1A	5	0	3	3	6
2024	Slovenia	OGQ	3	0	0	0	2
2025	Slovenia	WC	4	0	0	0	0
Junior totals			20	3	14	17	16
Senior totals			54	2	11	13	12
