= Tetsuya Saito =

Japanese ice hockey player

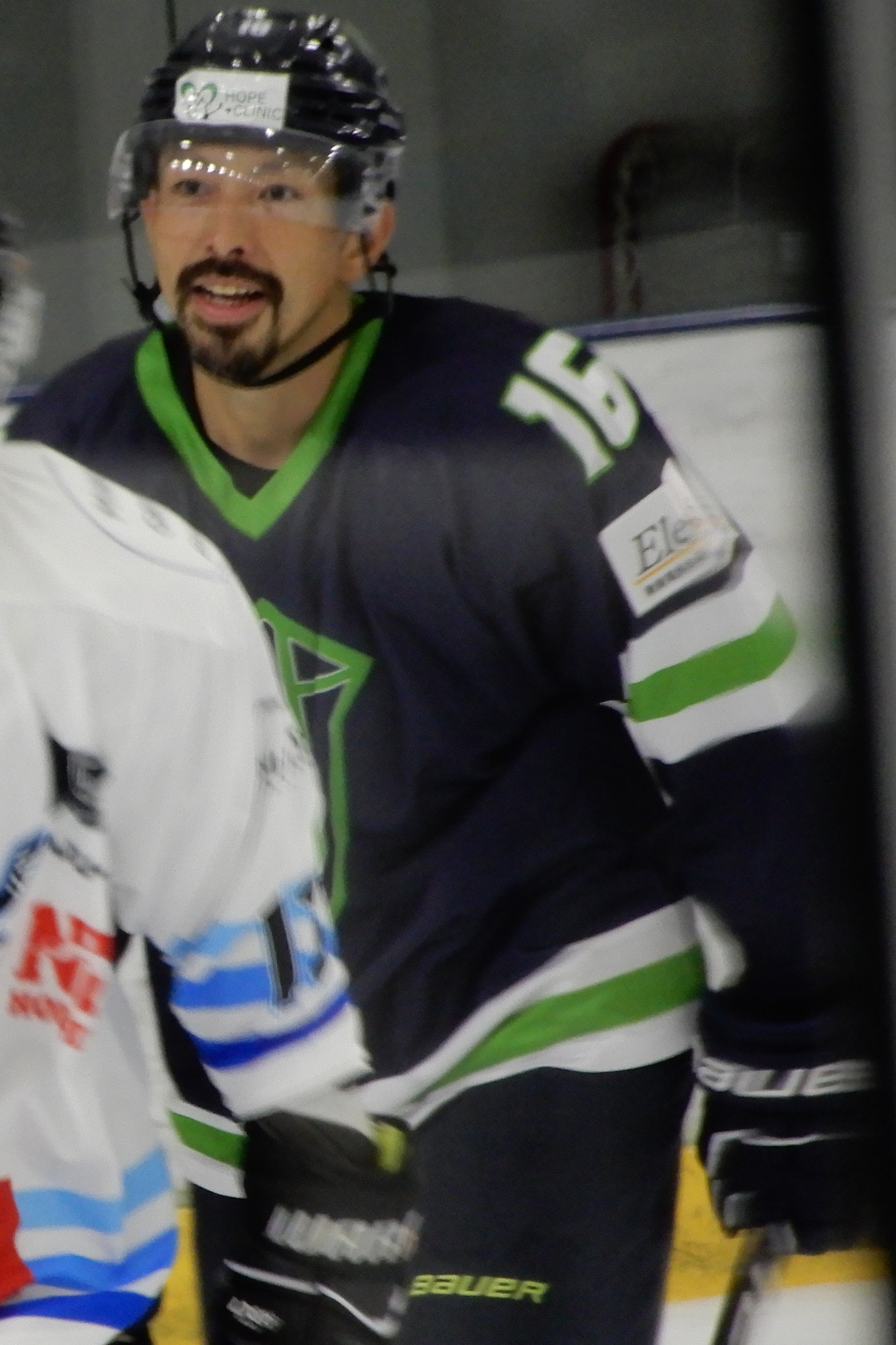
- Born: December 14, 1983 (age 42) Kushiro, Hokkaido, Japan
- Height: 1.76 m (5 ft 9 in)
- Weight: 78 kg (172 lb; 12 st 4 lb)
- Position: Center
- Shoots: Right
- Asia League team Former teams: Nikkō Ice Bucks; Oji Eagles
- National team: Japan
- Playing career: 2002–present

Tetsuya Saito
Medal record

Men's ice hockey

Representing Japan

Asian Games
Gold medal – first place	2007 Changchun	Ice hockey

Tetsuya Saito (斉藤 哲也, Saitō Tetsuya; born December 14, 1983) is a Japanese professional ice hockey center who currently plays for the Nikkō Ice Bucks in the Asia League

Saito previously played in 2001 to 2002, at amateur level, for the Komazawa Tomakomai before joining Oji Seishi in 2002 who changed their name to Oji Eagles one year later. He played for Oji until 2013 when he joined the Nikkō Ice Bucks.

Saito has also played for the Japan national team (U18, U20 & Senior) since 2000. He played in the 2002 IIHF World Championship.
