= Kaspars Astašenko =

Latvian ice hockey player (1975–2012)

- Born: 17 February 1975 Riga, Latvian SSR, Soviet Union
- Died: 20 November 2012 (aged 37) Riga, Latvia
- Height: 6 ft 1 in (185 cm)
- Weight: 206 lb (93 kg; 14 st 10 lb)
- Position: Defence
- Shot: Left
- Played for: HK Pārdaugava Rīga; HC CSKA Moscow; Tampa Bay Lightning; Ilves; HPK; HC Slovan Bratislava; Ritten Sport; Beibarys Atyrau; Belfast Giants
- National team: Latvia
- NHL draft: 127th overall, 1999; Tampa Bay Lightning
- Playing career: 1993–2012

Kaspars Astašenko (17 February 1975 – 20 November 2012) was a Latvian professional ice hockey player. Astašenko was born in Riga, Latvia. Astašenko was drafted by the Tampa Bay Lightning in the 1999 NHL entry draft, 127th overall. Astašenko played parts of two seasons in the National Hockey League with the Lightning.

== Playing career ==
=== Junior ===
Astašenko began his career in his native Riga with HK Pārdaugava Rīga, competing in both the Latvian top league and later to Russian Superleague before signing with Russian club, HC CSKA Moscow in 1995.

=== North America ===
In 1998, Astašenko signed with the Cincinnati Cyclones of the International Hockey League. After a stint with the Cyclones, Astašenko was surprisingly drafted by Tampa Bay and went on to play 23 regular games in the National Hockey League (NHL) for the Lightning as well as playing for the IHL's Detroit Vipers and Long Beach Ice Dogs. He later played in the American Hockey League for the Springfield Falcons and the Lowell Lock Monsters.

=== Europe ===
He would return to Europe in 2003, with stops at Finland's SM-liiga with Ilves and HPK, back in Russia with Khimik Voskresensk, the Slovak Extraliga with HC Slovan Bratislava, Ritten Sport of Italy's Serie A and the United Kingdom's Elite Ice Hockey League for the Belfast Giants as well as brief spells in his native Latvia and the lower leagues in Finland.

== International play ==
Astašenko played for the Latvian national team in the Ice Hockey World Championships in 2001 and 2006, as well as the 2002 Winter Olympics in Salt Lake City.

== Personal life ==
In 2003, Astašenko was arrested for possession of heroin in the United States, effectively ending his North American career. After suffering from various addictions, Astašenko died on 20 November 2012.

== Career statistics ==
=== Regular season and playoffs ===
			Regular season					Playoffs
Season	Team	League	GP	G	A	Pts	PIM	GP	G	A	Pts	PIM
1991–92	HK Cesis Vendenieki	LAT	12	7	5	12	14	–	–	–	–	–
1991–92	RASMS Rīga	CIS-3	5	1	0	1	0	–	–	–	–	–
1992–93	Pārdaugava Rīga	LAT	20	15	15	30	24	–	–	–	–	–
1993–94	Pārdaugava Rīga	RUS	4	0	0	0	10	–	–	–	–	–
1993–94	Hokeja Centrs Rīga	LAT	21	7	7	14	34	3	0	1	1	8
1994–95	Pārdaugava Rīga	RUS	25	0	0	0	24	–	–	–	–	–
1994–95	Pārdaugava–2 Rīga	LAT	1	1	0	1	0	–	–	–	–	–
1995–96	CSKA Moscow	RUS	26	0	1	1	10	–	–	–	–	–
1995–96	CSKA–2 Moscow	RUS-2	16	6	1	7	10	–	–	–	–	–
1996–97	CSKA Moscow	RSL	41	0	0	0	48	2	0	1	1	4
1997–98	CSKA Moscow	RSL	25	1	3	4	6	–	–	–	–	–
1998–99	Cincinnati Cyclones	IHL	74	3	11	14	166	3	0	2	2	6
1998–99	Dayton Bombers	ECHL	2	0	1	1	4	–	–	–	–	–
1999–00	Tampa Bay Lightning	NHL	8	0	1	1	4	–	–	–	–	–
1999–00	Detroit Vipers	IHL	51	1	10	11	86	–	–	–	–	–
1999–00	Long Beach Ice Dogs	IHL	14	0	3	3	10	–	–	–	–	–
2000–01	Tampa Bay Lightning	NHL	15	1	1	2	4	–	–	–	–	–
2000–01	Detroit Vipers	IHL	51	6	10	16	58	–	–	–	–	–
2001–02	Springfield Falcons	AHL	11	0	2	2	15	–	–	–	–	–
2001–02	Lowell Lock Monsters	AHL	37	2	8	10	39	5	1	1	2	2
2002–03	Lowell Lock Monsters	AHL	47	6	11	17	60	–	–	–	–	–
2003–04	HK Rīga 2000	LAT	11	2	6	8	24	–	–	–	–	–
2003–04	Ilves	SM-l	23	2	2	4	60	5	0	1	1	8
2004–05	Esbjerg IK	DEN	24	3	10	13	71	–	–	–	–	–
2004–05	ASK/Ogre	LAT	–	–	–	–	–	3	0	3	3	6
2005–06	Khimik Voskresensk	RUS-2	2	0	1	1	6	–	–	–	–	–
2005–06	Khimik–2 Voskresensk	RUS-3	1	0	0	0	4	–	–	–	–	–
2005–06	HPK	SM-l	28	2	4	6	112	12	0	1	1	49
2006–07	HC Slovan Bratislava	SVK	11	0	1	1	59	–	–	–	–	–
2006–07	ASK/Ogre	LAT	17	3	12	15	46	–	–	–	–	–
2007–08	Ritten Sport	ITA	29	3	16	19	76	13	2	5	7	36
2008–09	Ritten Sport	ITA	41	10	34	44	128	–	–	–	–	–
2010–11	Beibarys Atyrau	KAZ	14	1	1	2	24	–	–	–	–	–
2010–11	Belfast Giants	EIHL	14	0	5	5	13	–	–	–	–	–
2011–12	HK SMScredit	LAT	2	1	0	1	2	–	–	–	–	–
2011–12	Muik Hockey	FIN-4	8	9	4	13	20	–	–	–	–	–
LAT totals			84	36	45	81	144	6	0	4	4	14
IHL totals			190	10	34	44	320	3	0	2	2	6
NHL totals			23	1	2	3	8	–	–	–	–	–

=== International ===
Year	Team	Event	GP	G	A	Pts	PIM
1993	Latvia	EJC C	4	1	0	1	8
1994	Latvia	WJC C	4	6	4	10	4
1995	Latvia	WJC C1	4	0	0	0	18
2001	Latvia	WC	6	1	2	3	6
2002	Latvia	OG	3	0	1	1	0
2006	Latvia	WC	4	0	0	0	8
Junior totals			12	7	4	11	30
Senior totals			13	1	3	4	14
