= 1992 IIHF European Cup =

European ice hockey tournament

The 1992 European Cup was the 28th edition of the European Cup, IIHF's premier European club ice hockey tournament. The season started on October 9, 1992, and finished on December 30, 1992.

The tournament was won by Malmö IF, who beat Dynamo Moscow in the final.

== First group round ==
=== Group A ===
(Sofia, Bulgaria)

Team #1	Score	Team #2
Levski-Spartak Sofia (Bulgaria)	2:7	(Hungary) Ferencvárosi TC
HK Sāga Ķekava (Latvia)	4:1	(Hungary) Ferencvárosi TC
Levski-Spartak Sofia (Bulgaria)	1:5	(Latvia) HK Sāga Ķekava

=== Group A standings ===
Rank	Team	Points
1	(Latvia) HK Sāga Ķekava	4
2	(Hungary) Ferencvárosi TC	2
3	(Bulgaria) Levski-Spartak Sofia	0

=== Group B ===
(Piešťany, Slovak Republic, Czechoslovakia)

Team #1	Score	Team #2
HC Dukla Trenčín (Czechoslovakia)	13:1	(Croatia) KHL Zagreb
HK Acroni Jesenice (Slovenia)	7:5	(Croatia) KHL Zagreb
HC Dukla Trenčín (Czechoslovakia)	10:4	(Slovenia) HK Acroni Jesenice

=== Group B standings ===
Rank	Team	Points
1	(Czechoslovakia) HC Dukla Trenčín	4
2	(Slovenia) HK Acroni Jesenice	2
3	(Croatia) KHL Zagreb	0

=== Group C ===
(Herning, Denmark)

Team #1	Score	Team #2
Herning IK (Denmark)	0:9	(Estonia) Narva Kreenholm
Jokerit (Finland)	3:2	(Estonia) Narva Kreenholm
Herning IK (Denmark)	1:9	(Finland) Jokerit

=== Group C standings ===
Rank	Team	Points
1	(Finland) Jokerit	4
2	(Estonia) Narva Kreenholm	2
3	(Denmark) Herning IK	0

=== Group D ===
(Villach, Carinthia, Austria)

Team #1	Score	Team #2
EC Villacher SV (Austria)	5:1	(Netherlands) Meetpoint Estere Geleen
Meetpoint Estere Geleen (Netherlands)	2:1	(Belarus) Dinamo Minsk
EC Villacher SV (Austria)	5:3	(Belarus) Dinamo Minsk

=== Group D standings ===
Rank	Team	Points
1	(Austria) EC Villacher SV	4
2	(Netherlands) Meetpoint Estere Geleen	2
3	(Belarus) Dinamo Minsk	0

=== Group E ===
(Blackburn, England, United Kingdom)

Team #1	Score	Team #2
Vålerenga IF (Norway)	5:4	(Romania) HC Steaua București
Durham Wasps (United Kingdom)	9:2	(Spain) CHH Txuri Urdin
Vålerenga IF (Norway)	11:1	(Spain) CHH Txuri Urdin
Durham Wasps (United Kingdom)	3:6	(Romania) HC Steaua București
HC Steaua București (Romania)	10:1	(Spain) CHH Txuri Urdin
Durham Wasps (United Kingdom)	2:6	(Norway) Vålerenga IF

=== Group E standings ===
Rank	Team	Points
1	(Norway) Vålerenga IF	6
2	(Romania) HC Steaua București	4
3	(United Kingdom) Durham Wasps	2
4	(Spain) CHH Txuri Urdin	0

=== Group F ===
(Oświęcim, Poland)

Team #1	Score	Team #2
KS Unia Oświęcim (Poland)	16:1	(Lithuania) SC Energija
Sokil Kyiv (Ukraine)	16:3	(Lithuania) SC Energija
KS Unia Oświęcim (Poland)	3:2	(Ukraine) Sokil Kyiv

=== Group F standings ===
Rank	Team	Points
1	(Poland) KS Unia Oświęcim	4
2	(Ukraine) Sokil Kyiv	2
3	(Lithuania) SC Energija	0

(Italy) Lion Mediolanum Milano, (France) Rouen HC, (Switzerland) SC Bern, (Germany) Düsseldorfer EG, (Russia) Dynamo Moscow, (Sweden) Malmö IF : bye

== Second group round ==
=== Group G ===
(Rouen, France)

Team #1	Score	Team #2
Rouen HC (France)	13:0	(Latvia) HK Sāga Ķekava
Malmö IF (Sweden)	6:5	(Poland) KS Unia Oświęcim
Malmö IF (Sweden)	18:0	(Latvia) HK Sāga Ķekava
Rouen HC (France)	8:1	(Poland) KS Unia Oświęcim
Rouen HC (France)	4:3	(Sweden) Malmö IF
KS Unia Oświęcim (Poland)	11:1	(Latvia) HK Sāga Ķekava

=== Group G standings ===
Rank	Team	Points
1	(France) Rouen HC	6
2	(Sweden) Malmö IF	4
3	(Poland) KS Unia Oświęcim	2
4	(Latvia) HK Sāga Ķekava	0

=== Group H ===
(Milan, Italy)

Team #1	Score	Team #2
Düsseldorfer EG (Germany)	5:1	(Czechoslovakia) HC Dukla Trenčín
Lion Mediolanum Milano (Italy)	7:3	(Norway) Vålerenga IF
Düsseldorfer EG (Germany)	3:3	(Norway) Vålerenga IF
Lion Mediolanum Milano (Italy)	4:1	(Czechoslovakia) HC Dukla Trenčín
Lion Mediolanum Milano (Italy)	6:2	(Germany) Düsseldorfer EG
HC Dukla Trenčín (Czechoslovakia)	6:2	(Norway) Vålerenga IF

=== Group H standings ===
Rank	Team	Points
1	(Italy) Lion Mediolanum Milano	6
2	(Germany) Düsseldorfer EG	3
3	(Czechoslovakia) HC Dukla Trenčín	2
4	(Norway) Vålerenga IF	1

=== Group J ===
(Helsinki, Finland)

Team #1	Score	Team #2
Dynamo Moscow (Russia)	3:1	(Switzerland) SC Bern
Jokerit (Finland)	6:3	(Austria) EC Villacher SV
Jokerit (Finland)	0:1	(Switzerland) SC Bern
Dynamo Moscow (Russia)	2:1	(Austria) EC Villacher SV
Jokerit (Finland)	4:7	(Russia) Dynamo Moscow
SC Bern (Switzerland)	2:1	(Austria) EC Villacher SV

=== Group J standings ===
Rank	Team	Points
1	(Russia) Dynamo Moscow	6
2	(Switzerland) SC Bern	4
3	(Finland) Jokerit	2
4	(Austria) EC Villacher SV	0

== Final stage ==
(Düsseldorf, North Rhine-Westphalia, Germany)

=== Group 1 ===
Team #1	Score	Team #2
Malmö IF (Sweden)	5:0	(Poland) KS Unia Oświęcim
Lion Mediolanum Milano (Italy)	4:3	(Switzerland) SC Bern
KS Unia Oświęcim (Poland)	2:1	(Switzerland) SC Bern
Malmö IF (Sweden)	3:2	(Italy) Lion Mediolanum Milano
Lion Mediolanum Milano (Italy)	8:3	(Poland) KS Unia Oświęcim
Malmö IF (Sweden)	5:1	(Switzerland) SC Bern

=== Group 1 standings ===
Rank	Team	Points
1	(Sweden) Malmö IF	6
2	(Italy) Lion Mediolanum Milano	4
3	(Poland) KS Unia Oświęcim	2
4	(Switzerland) SC Bern	0

=== Group 2 ===
Team #1	Score	Team #2
Düsseldorfer EG (Germany)	8:2	(France) Rouen HC
Dynamo Moscow (Russia)	6:0	(Finland) Jokerit
Düsseldorfer EG (Germany)	0:3	(Finland) Jokerit
Dynamo Moscow (Russia)	5:0	(France) Rouen HC
Düsseldorfer EG (Germany)	1:3	(Russia) Dynamo Moscow
Jokerit (Finland)	4:2	(France) Rouen HC

=== Group 2 standings ===
Rank	Team	Points
1	(Russia) Dynamo Moscow	6
2	(Finland) Jokerit	4
3	(Germany) Düsseldorfer EG	2
4	(France) Rouen HC	0

=== Third place match ===
Team #1	Score	Team #2
Jokerit (Finland)	4:2	(Italy) Lion Mediolanum Milano

=== Final ===
Team #1	Score	Team #2
Malmö IF (Sweden)	3:3 (1:0 PS)	(Russia) Dynamo Moscow
