= 1991 IIHF European Cup =

European ice hockey tournament

The 1991 European Cup was the 27th edition of the European Cup, IIHF's premier European club ice hockey tournament. The season started on October 11, 1991, and finished on December 30, 1991.

The tournament was won by Djurgårdens IF, who beat Düsseldorfer EG in the final.

== First group round ==
=== Group A ===
(Herning, Denmark)

Team #1	Score	Team #2
Herning IK (Denmark)	2–6	(Poland) TMH Polonia Bytom
Vålerenga (Norway)	7–0	(United Kingdom) Durham Wasps
Herning IK (Denmark)	9–2	(United Kingdom) Durham Wasps
Vålerenga (Norway)	4–2	(Poland) TMH Polonia Bytom
Herning IK (Denmark)	6–9	(Norway) Vålerenga
TMH Polonia Bytom (Poland)	10–2	(United Kingdom) Durham Wasps

=== Group A standings ===
Rank	Team	Points
1	(Norway) Vålerenga	6
2	(Poland) TMH Polonia Bytom	4
3	(Denmark) Herning IK	2
4	(United Kingdom) Durham Wasps	0

=== Group B ===
(București, Romania)

Team #1	Score	Team #2
HK Olimpija Ljubljana (Socialist Federal Republic of Yugoslavia)	3–2	(Hungary) Ferencvárosi TC
HC Steaua București (Romania)	8–1	(Bulgaria) Slavia Sofia
HK Olimpija Ljubljana (Socialist Federal Republic of Yugoslavia)	8–0	(Bulgaria) Slavia Sofia
HC Steaua București (Romania)	6–4	(Hungary) Ferencvárosi TC
Ferencvárosi TC (Hungary)	8–4	(Bulgaria) Slavia Sofia
HC Steaua București (Romania)	0–6	(Socialist Federal Republic of Yugoslavia) HK Olimpija Ljubljana

=== Group B standings ===
Rank	Team	Points
1	(Socialist Federal Republic of Yugoslavia) HK Olimpija Ljubljana	6
2	(Romania) HC Steaua București	4
3	(Hungary) Ferencvárosi TC	2
4	(Bulgaria) Slavia Sofia	0

=== Group C ===
(Milan, Italy)

Team #1	Score	Team #2
Rouen HC (France)	13–0	(Spain) CH Jaca
HC Milano Saima (Italy)	9–1	(Netherlands) Peter Langhout Reizen Utrecht
Rouen HC (France)	5–2	(Netherlands) Peter Langhout Reizen Utrecht
HC Milano Saima (Italy)	17–2	(Spain) CH Jaca
Peter Langhout Reizen Utrecht (Netherlands)	7–0	(Spain) CH Jaca
HC Milano Saima (Italy)	4–2	(France) Rouen HC

=== Group C standings ===
Rank	Team	Points
1	(Italy) HC Milano Saima	6
2	(France) Rouen HC	4
3	(Netherlands) Peter Langhout Reizen Utrecht	2
4	(Spain) CH Jaca	0

(Switzerland) SC Bern, (Czechoslovakia) Dukla Jihlava, (Finland) TPS, (Germany) Düsseldorfer EG, (Soviet Union) Dynamo Moscow, (Sweden) Djurgårdens IF : bye

== Second group round ==
=== Group D ===
(Bern, Bern, Switzerland)

Team #1	Score	Team #2
Dynamo Moscow (Soviet Union)	6–0	(Poland) TMH Polonia Bytom
SC Bern (Switzerland)	3–2	(Socialist Federal Republic of Yugoslavia) HK Olimpija Ljubljana
SC Bern (Switzerland)	4–7	(Soviet Union) Dynamo Moscow
HK Olimpija Ljubljana (Socialist Federal Republic of Yugoslavia)	2–1	(Poland) TMH Polonia Bytom
SC Bern (Switzerland)	4–0	(Poland) TMH Polonia Bytom
Dynamo Moscow (Soviet Union)	6–2	(Socialist Federal Republic of Yugoslavia) HK Olimpija Ljubljana

=== Group D standings ===
Rank	Team	Points
1	(Soviet Union) Dynamo Moscow	6
2	(Switzerland) SC Bern	4
3	(Socialist Federal Republic of Yugoslavia) HK Olimpija Ljubljana	2
4	(Poland) TMH Polonia Bytom	0

=== Group E ===
(Düsseldorf, North Rhine-Westphalia, Germany)

Team #1	Score	Team #2
HC Milano Saima (Italy)	4–2	(Finland) TPS
Düsseldorfer EG (Germany)	21–0	(Romania) HC Steaua București
TPS (Finland)	8–0	(Romania) HC Steaua București
Düsseldorfer EG (Germany)	5–3	(Italy) HC Milano Saima
HC Milano Saima (Italy)	11–1	(Romania) HC Steaua București
Düsseldorfer EG (Germany)	7–3	(Finland) TPS

=== Group E standings ===
Rank	Team	Points
1	(Germany) Düsseldorfer EG	6
2	(Italy) HC Milano Saima	4
3	(Finland) TPS	2
4	(Romania) HC Steaua București	0

=== Group F ===
(Piešťany, Slovak Republic, Czechoslovakia)

Team #1	Score	Team #2
Rouen HC (France)	3–2	(Sweden) Djurgårdens IF
Dukla Jihlava (Czechoslovakia)	1–2	(Norway) Vålerenga
Djurgårdens IF (Sweden)	9–0	(Norway) Vålerenga
Dukla Jihlava (Czechoslovakia)	5–6	(France) Rouen HC
Dukla Jihlava (Czechoslovakia)	1–3	(Sweden) Djurgårdens IF
Vålerenga (Norway)	2–1	(France) Rouen HC

=== Group F standings ===
Rank	Team	Points
1	(Sweden) Djurgårdens IF	4
2	(France) Rouen HC	4
3	(Norway) Vålerenga	4
4	(Czechoslovakia) Dukla Jihlava	0

== Final stage ==
(Düsseldorf, North Rhine-Westphalia, Germany)

=== Group A ===
Team #1	Score	Team #2
Düsseldorfer EG (Germany)	2–0	(Switzerland) SC Bern
Düsseldorfer EG (Germany)	6–3	(France) Rouen HC
Rouen HC (France)	2–2	(Switzerland) SC Bern

=== Group A standings ===
Rank	Team	Points
1	(Germany) Düsseldorfer EG	6
2	(Switzerland) SC Bern	1
3	(France) Rouen HC	1

=== Group B ===
Team #1	Score	Team #2
Dynamo Moscow (Russia)	8–3	(Italy) HC Milano Saima
Djurgårdens IF (Sweden)	7–2	(Italy) HC Milano Saima
Djurgårdens IF (Sweden)	4–3	(Russia) Dynamo Moscow

=== Group B standings ===
Rank	Team	Points
1	(Sweden) Djurgårdens IF	4
2	(Russia) Dynamo Moscow	2
3	(Italy) HC Milano Saima	0

=== Third place match ===
Team #1
Dynamo Moscow (Russia)

Karpovtsev - 12:44, Petrenko - 18:13, Yushkevich - 27:12, Yakubov - 35:12, Yudin - 39:13, Zhamnov - 48:16

Score
6 500

referee Hansen

6–1 (2:1, 3:0, 1:0)

Team #2
(Switzerland) SC Bern

Horak - 1:08

=== Final ===
Team #1	Score	Team #2
Düsseldorfer EG (Germany)	10 000 2–7 (1:1, 1:2, 0:4)	(Sweden) Djurgårdens IF
