= 1987–88 IIHF European Cup =

European ice hockey tournament

The 1987–88 European Cup was the 23rd edition of the European Cup, the International Ice Hockey Federation (IIHF)'s premier European club ice hockey tournament. The season started on October 8, 1987, and finished on October 16, 1988. The tournament was won by CSKA Moscow, capturing their eleventh straight title and eighteenth overall.

== Preliminary round ==
Team #1	Score	Team #2
Slavia Sofia (Bulgaria)	5:8, 3:11	(United Kingdom) Murrayfield Racers

== Group round ==
=== Group A ===
(Megève, France)

Team #1	Score	Team #2
Tappara (Finland)	5:1	(Romania) HC Steaua București
Mont-Blanc (France)	5:3	(Poland) Podhale Nowy Targ
Podhale Nowy Targ (Poland)	3:2	(Romania) HC Steaua București
Mont-Blanc (France)	2:11	(Finland) Tappara
Mont-Blanc (France)	7:0	(Romania) HC Steaua București
Tappara (Finland)	5:1	(Poland) Podhale Nowy Targ

=== Group A standings ===
Rank	Team	Points
1	(Finland) Tappara	6
2	(France) Mont-Blanc	4
3	(Poland) Podhale Nowy Targ	2
4	(Romania) HC Steaua București	0

=== Group B ===
(Varese, Italy)

Team #1	Score	Team #2
AS Mastini Varese (Italy)	0:6	(Czechoslovakia) Tesla Pardubice
HC Lugano (Switzerland)	5:1	(Socialist Federal Republic of Yugoslavia) HK Jesenice
AS Mastini Varese (Italy)	3:1	(Socialist Federal Republic of Yugoslavia) HK Jesenice
HC Lugano (Switzerland)	4:5	(Czechoslovakia) Tesla Pardubice
Tesla Pardubice (Czechoslovakia)	8:3	(Socialist Federal Republic of Yugoslavia) HK Jesenice
AS Mastini Varese (Italy)	2:2	(Switzerland) HC Lugano

=== Group B standings ===
Rank	Team	Points
1	(Czechoslovakia) Tesla Pardubice	6
2	(Switzerland) HC Lugano	3
3	(Italy) AS Mastini Varese	3
4	(Socialist Federal Republic of Yugoslavia) HK Jesenice	0

=== Group C ===
(Oslo, Norway)

Team #1	Score	Team #2
CSKA Moscow (Soviet Union)	13:0	(East Germany) Dynamo Berlin
Vålerenga (Norway)	12:3	(Denmark) Herning IK
CSKA Moscow (Soviet Union)	13:0	(Denmark) Herning IK
Vålerenga (Norway)	3:2	(East Germany) Dynamo Berlin
Dynamo Berlin (East Germany)	5:3	(Denmark) Herning IK
Vålerenga (Norway)	0:5	(Soviet Union) CSKA Moscow

=== Group C standings ===
Rank	Team	Points
1	(Soviet Union) CSKA Moscow	6
2	(Norway) Vålerenga	4
3	(East Germany) Dynamo Berlin	2
4	(Denmark) Herning IK	0

=== Group D ===
(Rotterdam, Netherlands)

Team #1	Score	Team #2
IF Björklöven (Sweden)	3:1	(West Germany) Kölner EC
Rotterdam Panda's (Netherlands)	17:2	(United Kingdom) Murrayfield Racers
IF Björklöven (Sweden)	8:3	(United Kingdom) Murrayfield Racers
Rotterdam Panda's (Netherlands)	3:8	(West Germany) Kölner EC
Kölner EC (West Germany)	24:0	(United Kingdom) Murrayfield Racers
Rotterdam Panda's (Netherlands)	1:10	(Sweden) IF Björklöven

=== Group D standings ===
Rank	Team	Points
1	(Sweden) IF Björklöven	6
2	(West Germany) Kölner EC	4
3	(Netherlands) Rotterdam Panda's	2
4	(United Kingdom) Murrayfield Racers	0

== Final Group ==
(Davos, Graubünden, Switzerland)

Team #1	Score	Team #2
Tesla Pardubice (Czechoslovakia)	2:2	(Sweden) IF Björklöven
CSKA Moscow (Soviet Union)	8:2	(Finland) Tappara
Tesla Pardubice (Czechoslovakia)	5:2	(Finland) Tappara
CSKA Moscow (Soviet Union)	6:1	(Sweden) IF Björklöven
Tappara (Finland)	12:4	(Sweden) IF Björklöven
CSKA Moscow (Soviet Union)	2:1	(Czechoslovakia) Tesla Pardubice

=== Final group standings ===
Rank	Team	Points
1	(Soviet Union) CSKA Moscow	6
2	(Czechoslovakia) Tesla Pardubice	3
3	(Finland) Tappara	2
4	(Sweden) IF Björklöven	1
