= 1995 IIHF European Cup =

European ice hockey tournament

The 1995 European Cup was the 31st edition of the European Cup, IIHF's premier European club ice hockey tournament. The season started in September 1995, and finished on December 30, 1995.

The tournament was won by Jokerit, who beat Kölner Haie in the final.

== Preliminary round ==
Team #1	Score	Team #2
Tornado Luxembourg	4:5, 2:2	(Spain) CHH Txuri Urdin
Ankara Büyükşehir (Turkey)	2:15, 6:9	(Israel) HC Bat Yam

== First group round ==
=== Group A ===
(Sofia, Bulgaria)

Team #1	Score	Team #2
HC Steaua București (Romania)	17:0	(Federal Republic of Yugoslavia) HK Partizan
Levski Sofia (Bulgaria)	0:21	(Ukraine) Sokil Kyiv
Sokil Kyiv (Ukraine)	34:0	(Federal Republic of Yugoslavia) HK Partizan
Levski Sofia (Bulgaria)	0:8	(Romania) HC Steaua București
Levski Sofia (Bulgaria)	15:2	(Federal Republic of Yugoslavia) HK Partizan
Sokil Kyiv (Ukraine)	8:2	(Romania) HC Steaua București

=== Group A standings ===
Rank	Team	Points
1	(Ukraine) Sokil Kyiv	6
2	(Romania) HC Steaua București	4
3	(Bulgaria) Levski Sofia	2
4	(Federal Republic of Yugoslavia) HK Partizan	0

=== Group B ===
(Budapest, Hungary)

Team #1	Score	Team #2
Tivali Minsk (Belarus)	17:0	(Croatia) KHL Medveščak Zagreb
Ferencvárosi TC (Hungary)	1:7	(Kazakhstan) Torpedo Ust-Kamenogorsk
Torpedo Ust-Kamenogorsk (Kazakhstan)	15:1	(Croatia) KHL Medveščak Zagreb
Ferencvárosi TC (Hungary)	4:7	(Belarus) Tivali Minsk
Ferencvárosi TC (Hungary)	9:1	(Croatia) KHL Medveščak Zagreb
Torpedo Ust-Kamenogorsk (Kazakhstan)	6:6	(Belarus) Tivali Minsk

=== Group B standings ===
Rank	Team	Points
1	(Belarus) Tivali Minsk	5
2	(Kazakhstan) Torpedo Ust-Kamenogorsk	5
3	(Hungary) Ferencvárosi TC	2
4	(Croatia) KHL Medveščak Zagreb	0

=== Group C ===
(Herning, Denmark)

Team #1	Score	Team #2
Herning IK (Denmark)	10:2	(Israel) HC Bat Yam
Narva Kreenholm (Estonia)	8:1	(Lithuania) SC Energija
Narva Kreenholm (Estonia)	11:1	(Israel) HC Bat Yam
Herning IK (Denmark)	10:2	(Lithuania) SC Energija
SC Energija (Lithuania)	8:6	(Israel) HC Bat Yam
Herning IK (Denmark)	7:0	(Estonia) Narva Kreenholm

=== Group C standings ===
Rank	Team	Points
1	(Denmark) Herning IK	6
2	(Estonia) Narva Kreenholm	4
3	(Lithuania) SC Energija	2
4	(Israel) HC Bat Yam	0

=== Group D ===
(Tilburg, Netherlands)

Team #1	Score	Team #2
HDD Olimpija Ljubljana (Slovenia)	17:2	(Spain) CHH Txuri Urdin
Tilburg Trappers (Netherlands)	1:4	(United Kingdom) Sheffield Steelers
HDD Olimpija Ljubljana (Slovenia)	5:3	(United Kingdom) Sheffield Steelers
Tilburg Trappers (Netherlands)	14:1	(Spain) CHH Txuri Urdin
Sheffield Steelers (United Kingdom)	9:2	(Spain) CHH Txuri Urdin
Tilburg Trappers (Netherlands)	2:8	(Slovenia) HDD Olimpija Ljubljana

=== Group D standings ===
Rank	Team	Points
1	(Slovenia) HDD Olimpija Ljubljana	6
2	(United Kingdom) Sheffield Steelers	4
3	(Netherlands) Tilburg Trappers	2
4	(Spain) CHH Txuri Urdin	0

(Poland) Podhale Nowy Targ, (Austria) VEU Feldkirch, (Norway) Storhamar, (Italy) HC Bolzano, (France) Rouen HC, (Switzerland) EHC Kloten, (Finland) TPS, (Slovakia) TJ VSŽ Košice, (Czech Republic) HC Petra Vsetín, (Russia) Dynamo Moscow, (Sweden) HV71 : bye

== Second group round ==
=== Group E ===
(Hamar, Norway)

Team #1	Score	Team #2
HV71 (Sweden)	4:2	(Slovakia) TJ VSŽ Košice
Storhamar (Norway)	4:0	(Ukraine) Sokil Kyiv
Storhamar (Norway)	1:3	(Slovakia) TJ VSŽ Košice
HV71 (Sweden)	8:1	(Ukraine) Sokil Kyiv
TJ VSŽ Košice (Slovakia)	6:1	(Ukraine) Sokil Kyiv
Storhamar (Norway)	1:3	(Sweden) HV71

=== Group E standings ===
Rank	Team	Points
1	(Sweden) HV71	6
2	(Slovakia) TJ VSŽ Košice	4
3	(Norway) Storhamar	2
4	(Ukraine) Sokil Kyiv	0

=== Group F ===
(Kloten, Canton of Zürich, Switzerland)

Team #1	Score	Team #2
EHC Kloten (Switzerland)	3:3	(Austria) VEU Feldkirch
Tivali Minsk (Belarus)	4:4	(Finland) TPS
VEU Feldkirch (Austria)	8:2	(Belarus) Tivali Minsk
EHC Kloten (Switzerland)	3:2	(Finland) TPS
VEU Feldkirch (Austria)	5:3	(Finland) TPS
EHC Kloten (Switzerland)	2:5	(Belarus) Tivali Minsk

=== Group F standings ===
Rank	Team	Points
1	(Austria) VEU Feldkirch	5
2	(Belarus) Tivali Minsk	3
3	(Switzerland) EHC Kloten	3
4	(Finland) TPS	1

=== Group G ===
(Bolzano, Italy)

Team #1	Score	Team #2
Dynamo Moscow (Russia)	3:0	(Kazakhstan) Torpedo Ust-Kamenogorsk
HC Bolzano (Italy)	10:3	(Denmark) Herning IK
Dynamo Moscow (Russia)	10:1	(Denmark) Herning IK
HC Bolzano (Italy)	4:7	(Kazakhstan) Torpedo Ust-Kamenogorsk
HC Bolzano (Italy)	4:5	(Russia) Dynamo Moscow
Torpedo Ust-Kamenogorsk (Kazakhstan)	3:2	(Denmark) Herning IK

=== Group G standings ===
Rank	Team	Points
1	(Russia) Dynamo Moscow	6
2	(Kazakhstan) Torpedo Ust-Kamenogorsk	4
3	(Italy) HC Bolzano	2
4	(Denmark) Herning IK	0

=== Group H ===
(Vsetín, Czech Republic)

Team #1	Score	Team #2
Rouen HC (France)	5:2	(Poland) Podhale Nowy Targ
HC Petra Vsetín (Czech Republic)	7:1	(Slovenia) HDD Olimpija Ljubljana
HC Petra Vsetín (Czech Republic)	4:2	(France) Rouen HC
HDD Olimpija Ljubljana (Slovenia)	11:4	(Poland) Podhale Nowy Targ
Rouen HC (France)	3:2	(Slovenia) HDD Olimpija Ljubljana
HC Petra Vsetín (Czech Republic)	4:2	(Poland) Podhale Nowy Targ

=== Group H standings ===
Rank	Team	Points
1	(Czech Republic) HC Petra Vsetín	6
2	(France) Rouen HC	4
3	(Slovenia) HDD Olimpija Ljubljana	2
4	(Poland) Podhale Nowy Targ	0

(Germany) Kölner Haie, (Finland) Jokerit : bye

== Final stage ==
(Cologne, North Rhine-Westphalia, Germany)

=== Group J ===
Team #1	Score	Team #2
Jokerit (Finland)	5:2	(Czech Republic) HC Petra Vsetín
HV71 (Sweden)	5:3	(Czech Republic) HC Petra Vsetín
Jokerit (Finland)	5:3	(Sweden) HV71

=== Group J standings ===
Rank	Team	Points
1	(Finland) Jokerit	4
2	(Sweden) HV71	2
3	(Czech Republic) HC Petra Vsetín	0

=== Group K ===
Team #1	Score	Team #2
Kölner Haie (Germany)	4:1	(Russia) Dynamo Moscow
VEU Feldkirch (Austria)	3:3	(Russia) Dynamo Moscow
Kölner Haie (Germany)	4:2	(Austria) VEU Feldkirch

=== Group K standings ===
Rank	Team	Points
1	(Germany) Kölner Haie	4
2	(Austria) VEU Feldkirch	1
3	(Russia) Dynamo Moscow	1

=== Third place match ===
Team #1	Score	Team #2
HV71 (Sweden)	10:3	(Austria) VEU Feldkirch

=== Final ===
Team #1	Score	Team #2
Kölner Haie (Germany)	3:3 (2:3 PS)	(Finland) Jokerit
