= Pekka Marjamäki =

Finnish ice hockey player

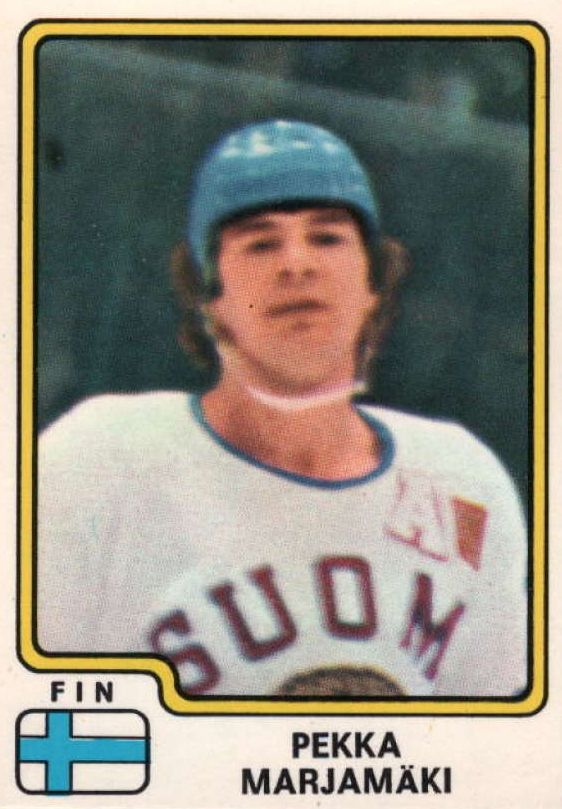
- Born: 18 December 1947; Tampere, Finland
- Died: 10 May 2012 (aged 64); Tampere, Finland
- Height: 6 ft 1 in (185 cm)
- Weight: 207 lb (94 kg; 14 st 11 lb)
- Position: Defence
- Shot: Left
- Played for: Tappara; HV71
- National team: Finland
- Playing career: 1964–1984

Pekka Tapani Marjamäki (18 December 1947 – 10 May 2012) was a Finnish ice hockey player who played in the SM-liiga. He played for Tappara.

Marjamäki also played for HV 71 during the 1979–80 season. He was inducted into the Finnish Hockey Hall of Fame in 1990, and into the IIHF Hall of Fame in 1998.

Marjamäki had a heart attack when returning home from the supermarket on 7 May 2012. He was hospitalised and died in the intensive care unit of the hospital of Tampere during the early hours of 10 May.
