= 1968–69 IIHF European Cup =

European ice hockey tournament

The 1968–69 European Cup was the fourth edition of the European Cup, IIHF's premier European club ice hockey tournament. The season started on September 17, 1968 and finished on October 12, 1969.

The tournament was won by CSKA Moscow, who beat EC KAC in the final

== First round ==
Team #1	Score	Team #2
HK Jesenice (Socialist Federal Republic of Yugoslavia)	5:6, 3:5	(Austria) EC KAC
HC Chamonix (France)	2:5, 0:4	(Switzerland) HC La Chaux-de-Fonds
Vålerenga (Norway)	3:7, 4:17	(Sweden) Brynäs IF
HK Metallurg Pernik (Bulgaria)	4:4, 3:7	(Hungary) Újpesti Dózsa
GKS Katowice (Poland)	w/o	(Finland) Koo-Vee
Dynamo Berlin (East Germany)	w/o	(Romania) HC Dinamo București

(West Germany) EV Füssen, (Czechoslovakia) Dukla Jihlava : bye

== Second round ==
Team #1	Score	Team #2
EC KAC (Austria)	5:2, 2:1	(West Germany) EV Füssen
HC La Chaux-de-Fonds (Switzerland)	10:4, 3:2	(Hungary) Újpesti Dózsa
GKS Katowice (Poland)	1:2, 3:3	(East Germany) Dynamo Berlin
Brynäs IF (Sweden)	w/o	(Czechoslovakia) Dukla Jihlava

== Third round ==
Team #1	Score	Team #2
HC La Chaux-de-Fonds (Switzerland)	4:5, 4:3 (2:3 PS)	(Austria) EC KAC
Dynamo Berlin (East Germany)	w/o	(Sweden) Brynäs IF

(Czechoslovakia) ZKL Brno, (Soviet Union) CSKA Moscow : bye

== Semifinals ==
Team #1	Score	Team #2
EC KAC (Austria)	w/o	(Czechoslovakia) ZKL Brno
Dynamo Berlin (East Germany)	1:11, 0:13	(Soviet Union) CSKA Moscow

== Finals ==
Team #1	Score	Team #2
EC KAC (Austria)	1:9, 3:14	(Soviet Union) CSKA Moscow
