= Tappara =

Professional ice hockey club based in Tampere, Finland

- City: Tampere
- League: SM-liiga
- Founded: 1932 (as Tammerfors Bollklubb); 1955 (as Tappara)
- Home arena: Nokia Arena (capacity: 12,700)
- Colours: Blue, orange, white
- Owner: Tamhockey Oy
- General manager: Janne Vuorinen
- Head coach: Fredrik Norrena
- Captain: Otto Rauhala
- Website: tappara.fi
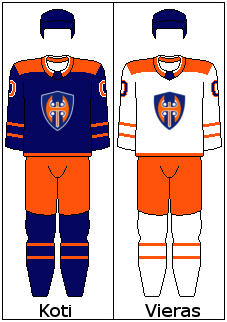

Franchise history
- 1932–1955: Tammerfors Bollklub
- 1955–present: Tappara

Championships
- Regular season titles: 1977, 1978, 1981, 1984, 1986, 2002, 2017, 2022, 2023, 2024, 2026
- SM-sarja & Liiga: 1953, 1954, 1955, 1959, 1961, 1964, 1975, 1977, 1979, 1982, 1984, 1986, 1987, 1988, 2003, 2016, 2017, 2022, 2023, 2024, 2026

Tappara (pronounced [ˈtɑpːɑrɑ]; Finnish for "Battle axe") is a Finnish professional ice hockey team playing in the SM-liiga. They play at Nokia Arena in Tampere, Finland. The team has won 21 Finnish league championships, which makes them the most successful club in Finland. The team continued the traditions of the Tammerfors Bollklub.

== History ==
=== Early days and the transition from TBK to Tappara ===
The predecessor of Tappara, TBK (Tammerfors Bollklubb), was established in 1932 by the Tampere Swedish School (Svenska samskolan i Tammerfors) as its own sports club. After winning the Finnish championship in 1953, 1954 and 1955, the TBK ice hockey department founded Tappara as its new club in 1955 to make it more accessible to non-Swedish-speaking locals and give it opportunity to grow as a club, at the same time the ice hockey division of TBK stopped as an ice hockey club at the highest competitive level. Most of the players transferred from TBK to Tappara. Tappara used TBK's colors and got their place in the top league. Tappara played its first official game in the same year, 1955. The transition was led by team president Harry Lindblad.

=== First period of success as Tappara (1956–1964) ===
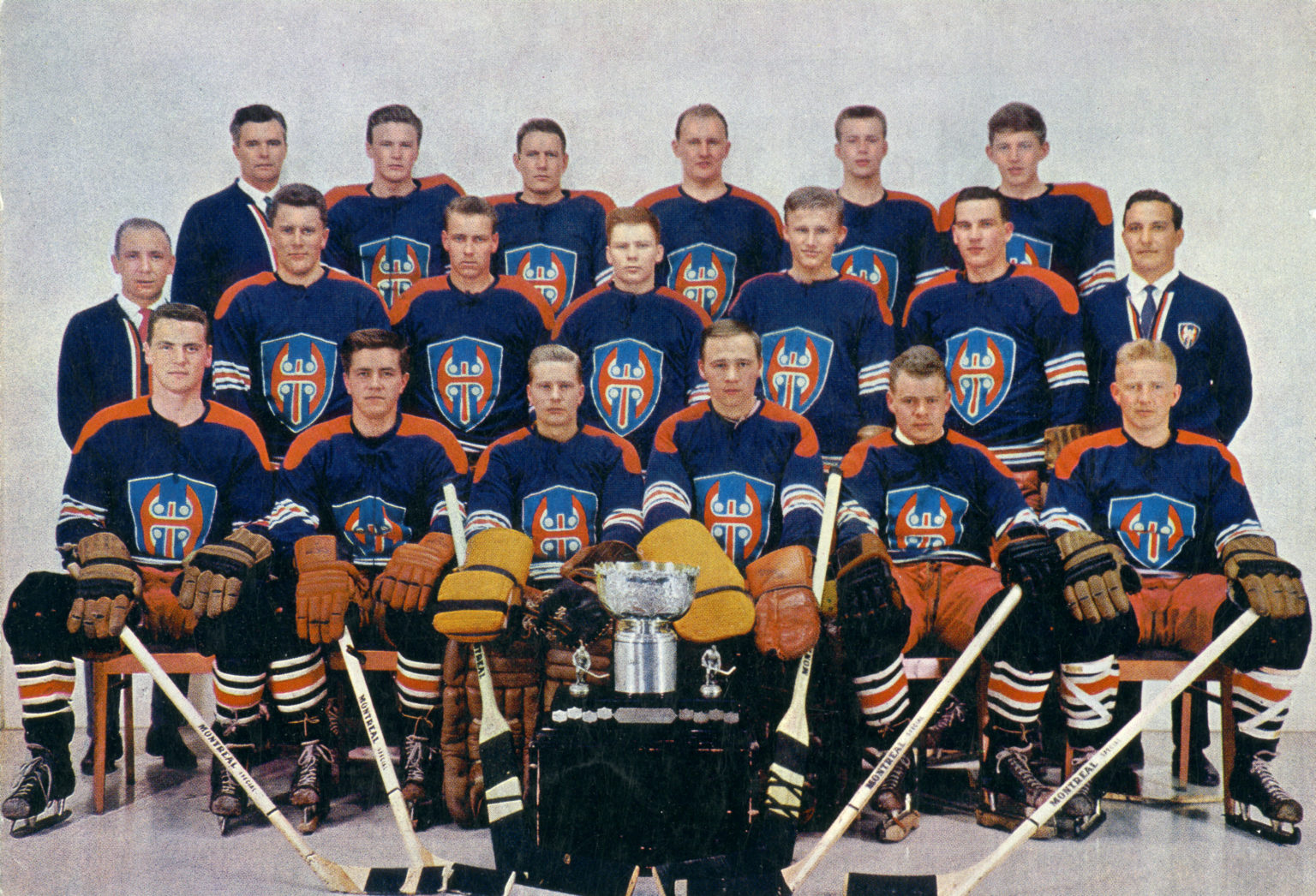
Tappara championship squad in 1961

Tappara went on to win three championships (1959, 1961, and 1964), three second places (1958, 1960, and 1963), and three third places (1956, 1957, and 1962) in just nine years. Their winning streak was followed by a more silent period, with Tappara even playing one season (1965–1966) at the second highest level, gaining immediate promotion back to the top flight. In 1965, an indoor arena Tampereen jäähalli was built in Hakametsä to be the home arena of Tappara and their local rivals, Ilves and Koo-Vee. 1965 World Ice Hockey Championships were also held there in the same year.

=== Second period of success (1975–1988) ===
Tappara fans waited until the mid-seventies until Tappara started to be successful again, thanks to some legendary players such as the goalkeeper Antti Leppänen and the defender Pekka Marjamäki. The bronze medals in 1973 and silver medals in 1974 were followed by Finnish championship in 1975. This successful period was even longer than the first period of glory in the 1950s and early sixties. Tappara also won the Finnish championships in 1977, 1979, 1982, 1984, and the long streak ended by winning three consecutive championships in 1986–1988.

Many fans regard the Tappara team of the late 1980s – coached by Rauno Korpi – as their strongest of all time. Behind the senior players such as Timo Susi and Erkki Lehtonen, the likes of Teppo Numminen (a long-term defender in NHL) and Janne Ojanen (Tappara icon) led the way as new talented youngsters. In 1988, the Finland national team gained its first success by winning the Olympic silver medal in Calgary, and Tappara players formed a substantial part of the Finnish team. Tappara players, Erkki Lehtonen and Janne Ojanen, were the goal scorers for Finland in the decisive win against the Soviet Union.

=== Recent days and success in mid-2010s ===
During the 1990s, Tappara did not gain any notable success besides finishing third in the league in spring 1990. In 1992, the once so mighty team even had to fight for its place at the top level in relegation playoffs against Oulun Kärpät. A glimpse of glory was, however, achieved on the international level, as Tappara player Timo Jutila captained the Finnish national team to win the ice hockey world championship in 1995. In the early 2000s, Tappara played some good seasons, winning silver medals in both 2001 and 2002. In 2003 – to the surprise of many – Tappara won the Finnish championship, coached by Jukka Rautakorpi. After that, Tappara reached third place in the top league in 2008 but that achievement was followed by some difficult seasons. Tappara qualified only once to the playoffs between 2009 and 2012.

All changed in the 2012–13 season when Tappara made it to the finals for the first time since the 2003 championship, but lost to Ässät. In 2014 and 2015 Tappara came even closer to the title. Both final series were decided in a decisive seventh game and both of the games Kärpät won in overtime. In 2016, Tappara finally won the championship after beating HIFK in the finals. In 2017, Tappara won the regular season for the first time since 2002, advanced to the finals for the fifth time in a row and won another championship against KalPa. In 2018, Tappara reached the finals for a record-breaking sixth year in a row, but lost to Kärpät in 6 games. The great streak of final appearances came to an end in 2019 when HPK defeated Tappara in the semi-finals in six games. The medal streak continued however, as Tappara won the bronze medal game against HIFK.. Later on, Tappara would win three consecutive championships in 2022-2024, plus a CHL-title against Luleå Hockey in 2023. They would also win gold in 2026, marking their 21st gold in their history while maintaining their reign as the most successful team in Finnish ice hockey history.

== Home arena ==
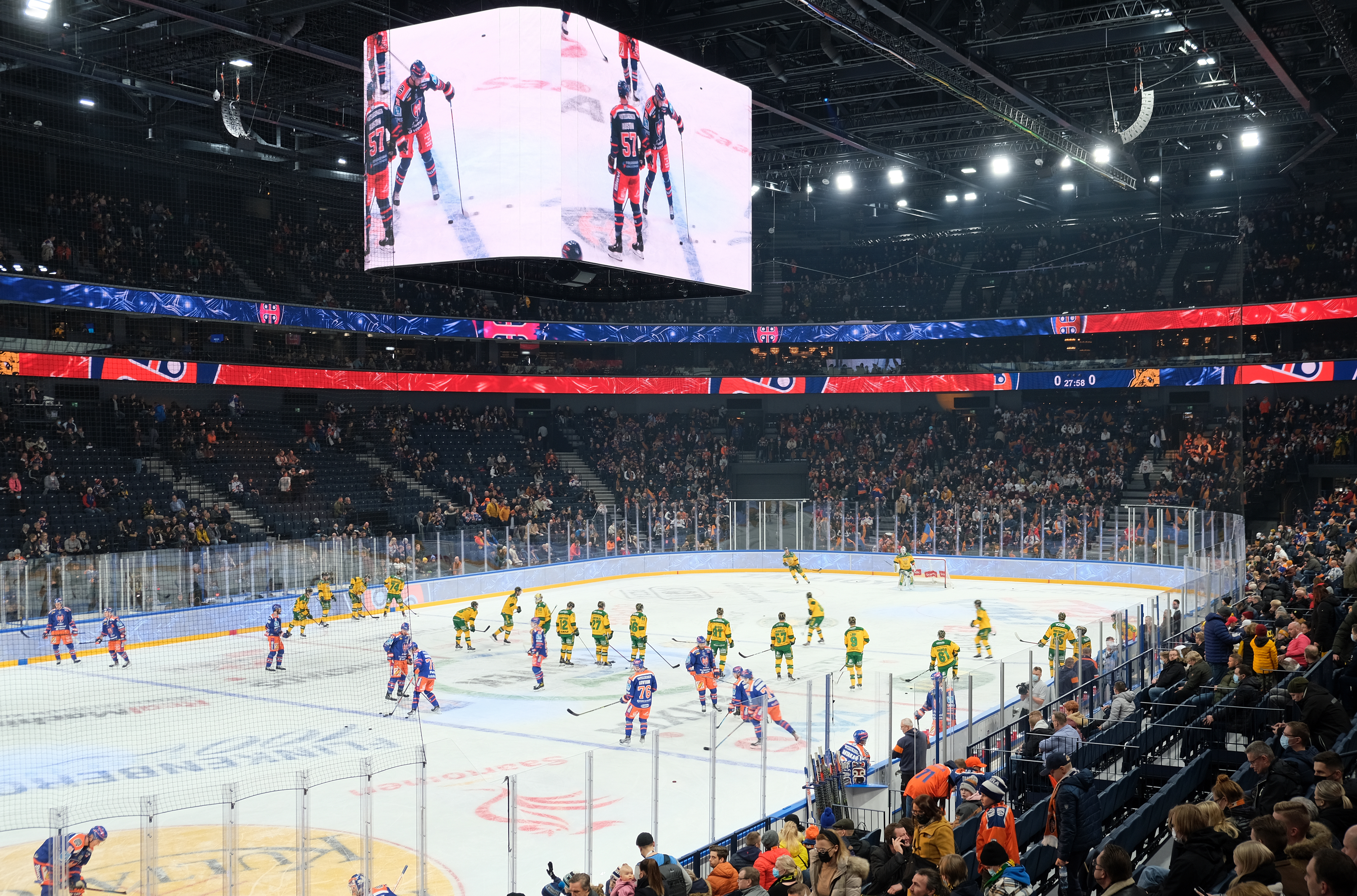
Nokia Arena, Tampere, Finland

Tappara used to play their home games in Tampereen jäähalli since it was built in 1965. The local rival Ilves used the same arena. The arena was the first indoor arena in Finland and it is located in the neighborhood of Hakametsä. Originally the capacity was 10,200 spectators, but it has declined in various renovations over the years. In its current form, the arena accommodates 7,300 spectators. The old rink continues as a venue for indoor sports. The ice-hockey club KooVee used the stadium as its home until its bankruptcy in 2024, and the junior teams of Tappara and Ilves use this location for official games.

Currently, Tappara's home arena is Nokia Arena. This new arena was built in the city center of Tampere on a covered rail yard and opened in December 2021. The arena has a capacity of 13,455 in hockey games. The arena was the main stage of Ice Hockey World Championships in both 2022 and 2023. Like the old arena, the new arena is also shared with local rivals Ilves. The arena is also a major venue for concerts.

== Current roster ==
Updated 6 April 2026.

| No. | Nat | Player | Pos | S/G | Age | Acquired | Birthplace |
|---|---|---|---|---|---|---|---|
| 24 | (France) | Justin Addamo | C | L | 28 | 2026 | Clermont-Ferrand, France |
| 15 | (Sweden) | Jonathan Andersson | D | L | 33 | 2025 | Valdemarsvik, Sweden |
| 88 | (Denmark) | Joachim Blichfeld | RW | R | 28 | 2025 | Fredrikshavn, Denmark |
| 5 | (United States) | Daniel Brickley | D | L | 31 | 2024 | Salt Lake City, Utah, United States |
| 25 | (Finland) | Henrik Haapala | LW | L | 32 | 2025 | Lempäälä, Finland |
| 30 | (Finland) | Christian Heljanko | G | L | 29 | 2025 | Askola, Finland |
| 23 | (Finland) | Jyrki Jokipakka | D | L | 35 | 2025 | Tampere, Finland |
| 44 | (Finland) | Olli Juolevi | D | L | 28 | 2023 | Helsinki, Finland |
| 51 | (Finland) | Emil Järventie | LW | L | 21 | 2024 | Tampere, Finland |
| 20 | (Finland) | Oiva Keskinen | C | L | 22 | 2023 | Ylöjärvi, Finland |
| 4 | (Finland) | Jesper Kotajärvi | D | L | 19 | 2024 | Kokkola, Finland |
| 21 | (Finland) | Aleksi Matinmikko | D | R | 26 | 2024 | Oulu, Finland |
| 26 | (Finland) | Jesper Mattila | D | L | 29 | 2025 | Tampere, Finland |
| 62 | (Finland) | Julius Mattila | C | L | 29 | 2024 | Tampere, Finland |
| 77 | (Finland) | Juha Metsola | G | L | 37 | 2024 | Tampere, Finland |
| 35 | (Lithuania) | Faustas Nauseda | G | L | 25 | 2025 | Vantaa, Finland |
| 41 | (Finland) | Juuso Nykänen | W | R | 23 | 2024 | Veteli, Finland |
| 17 | (Czech Republic) | Ondřej Pavel | C | L | 26 | 2025 | Prague, Czech Republic |
| 57 | (Finland) | Juho Piiparinen | D | R | 18 | 2025 | Lahti, Finland |
| 42 | (Finland) | Otto Rauhala (C) | C | L | 31 | 2014 | Ylöjärvi, Finland |
| 78 | (Finland) | Benjamin Rautiainen | LW | L | 21 | 2023 | Tampere, Finland |
| 11 | (Finland) | Aapeli Räsänen | C | R | 28 | 2024 | Tampere, Finland |
| 5 | (Finland) | Iivari Räsänen | D | L | 25 | 2025 | Tampere, Finland |
| 11 | (Finland) | Kasper Simontaival | RW | R | 25 | 2025 | Tampere, Finland |
| 89 | (Finland) | Oliver Suvanto | C | L | 18 | 2025 | Turku, Finland |
| 51 | (Sweden) | Emil Sylvegård | LW | L | 33 | 2025 | Malmö, Sweden |
| 27 | (Finland) | Kristian Tanus | LW | L | 26 | 2018 | Tampere, Finland |
| 82 | (Finland) | Eetu Tuulola | RW | R | 28 | 2025 | Hämeenlinna, Finland |
| 63 | (Finland) | Joni Tuulola | D | L | 30 | 2021 | Hämeenlinna, Finland |
| 94 | (Finland) | Vilho Vanhatalo | LW | L | 18 | 2025 | Tampere, Finland |

== Notable players ==
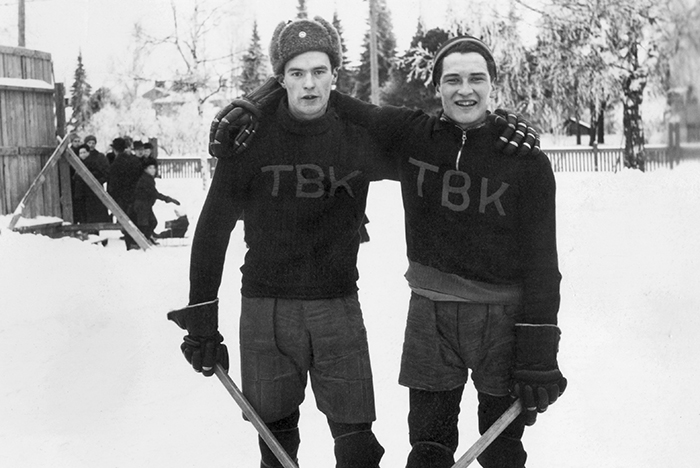
Jarl Ohlson and Vasif Ahsen Böre early 1940s

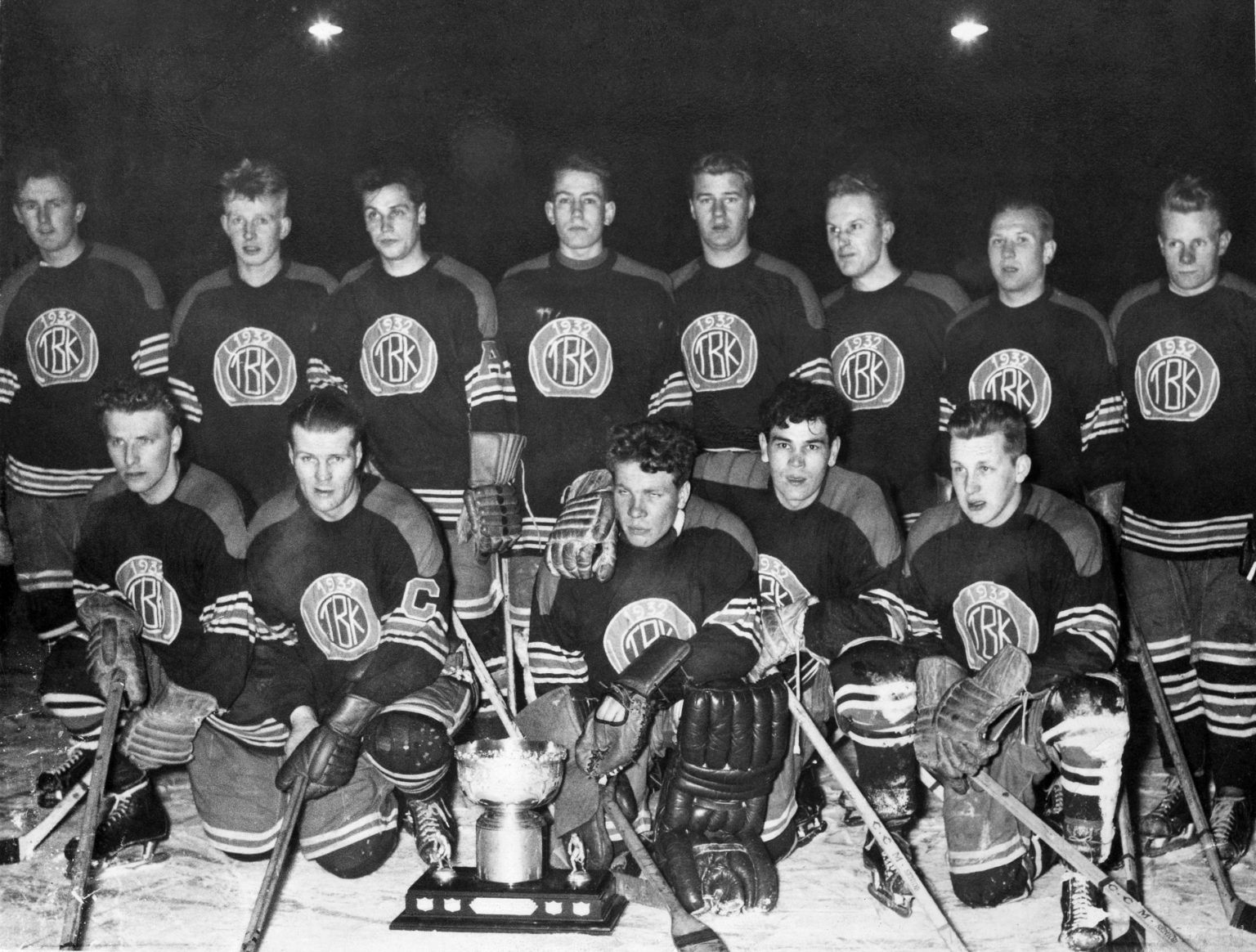
TBK in 1955

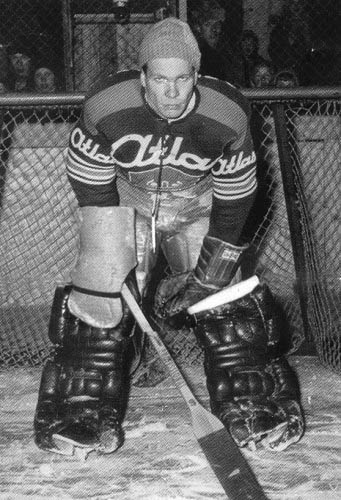
Esko Niemi

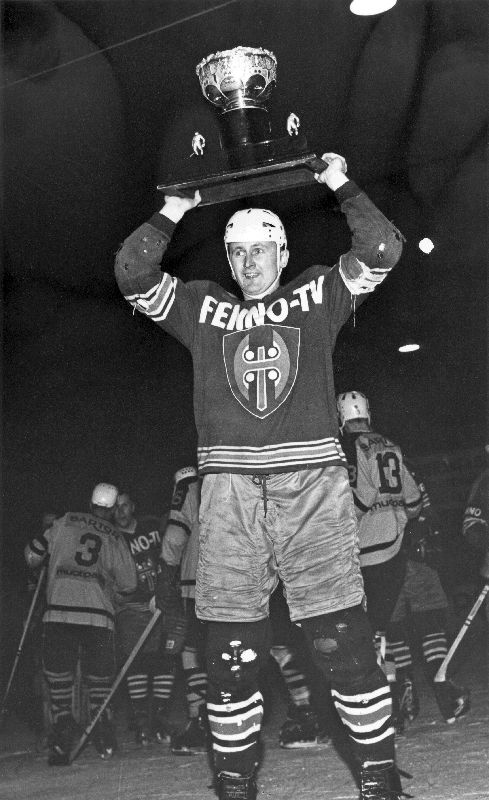
Esko Luostarinen

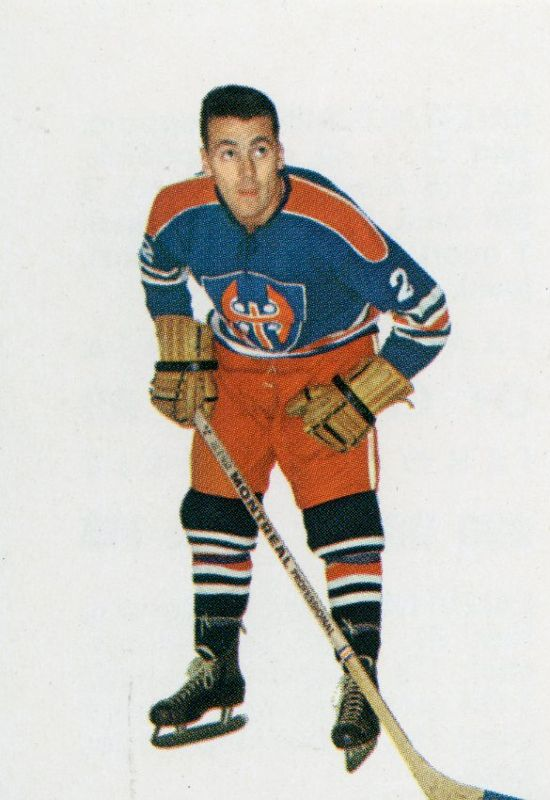
Kalevi Numminen

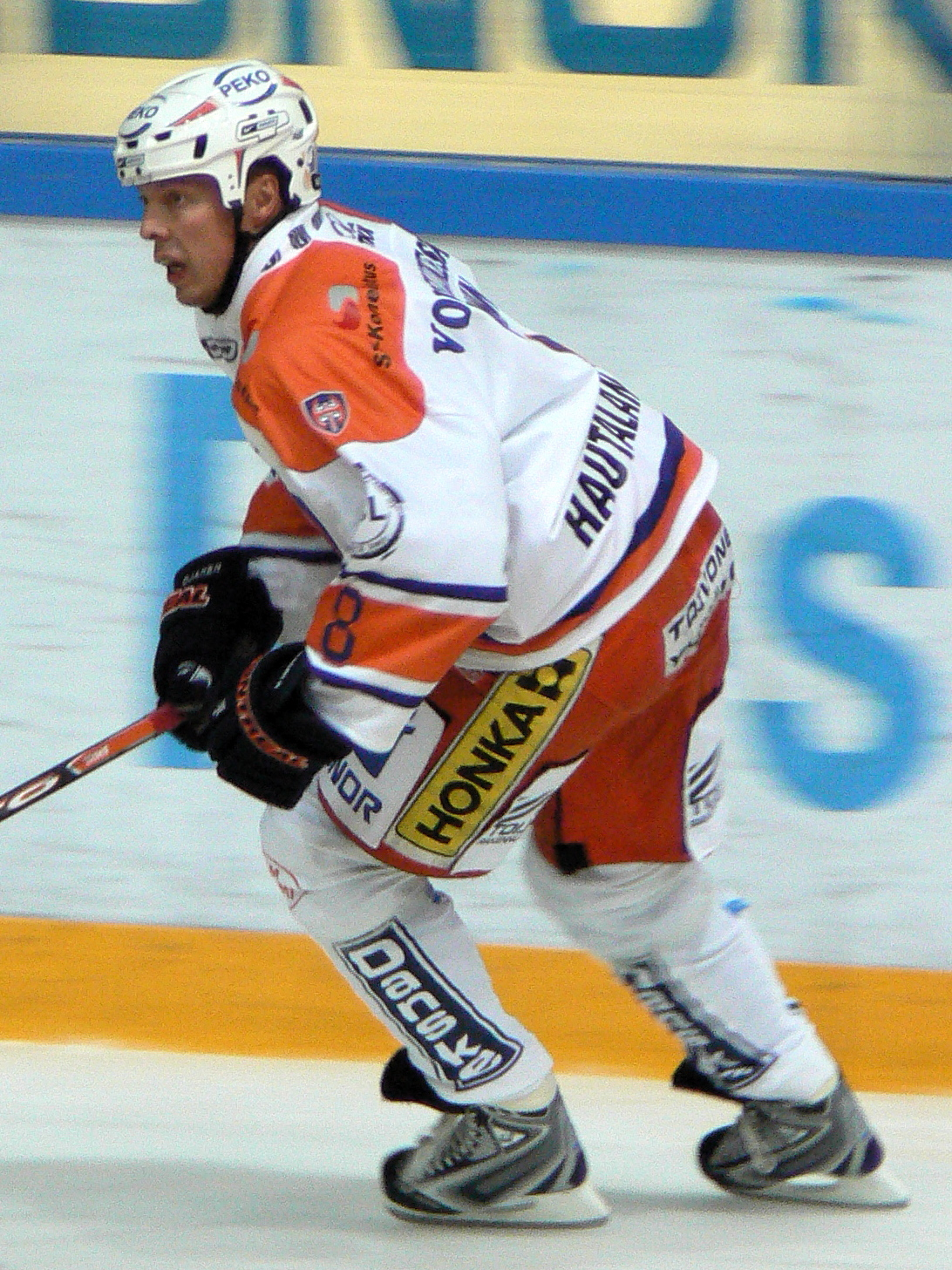
Janne Ojanen

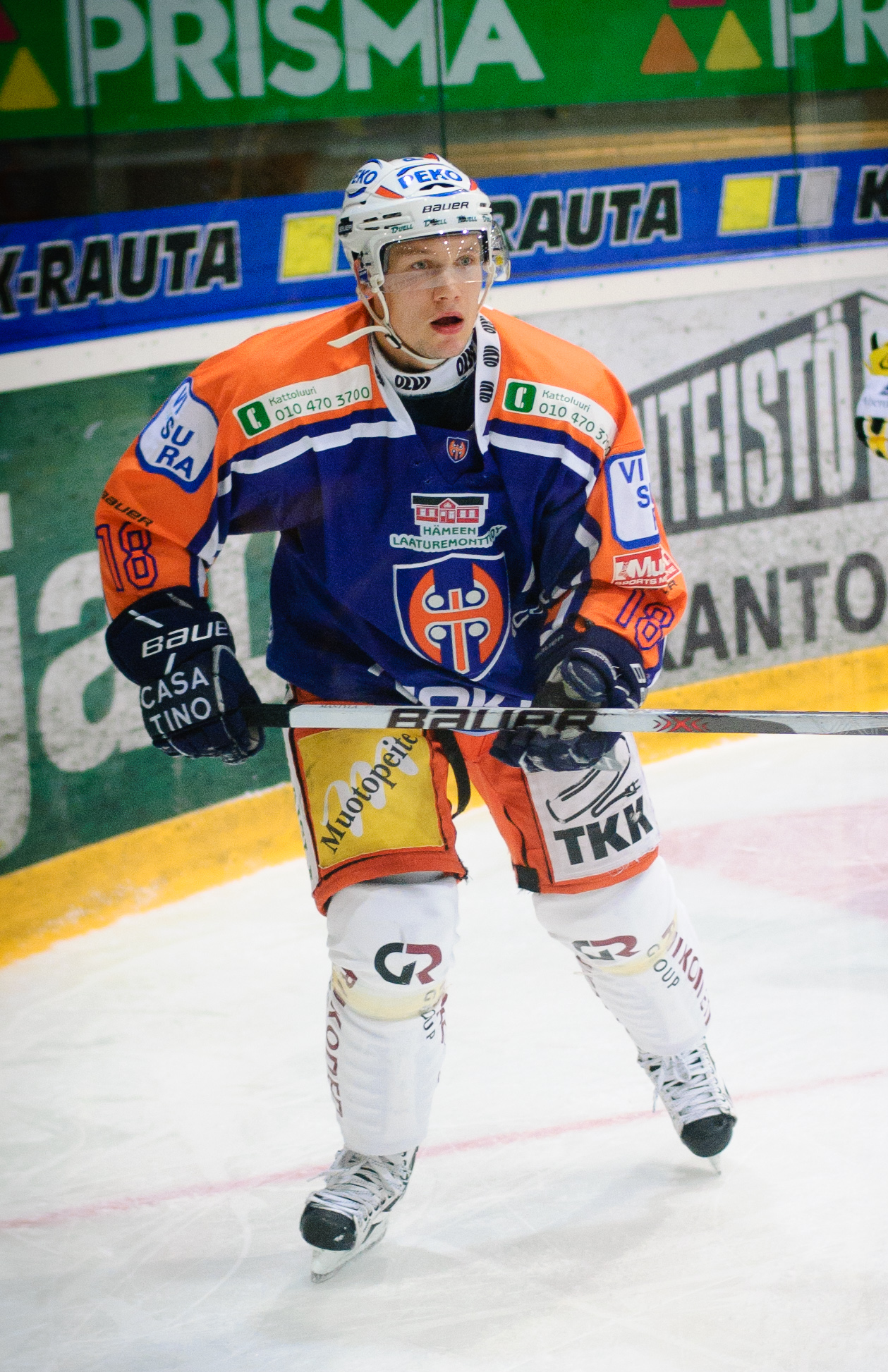
Tuukka Mäntylä

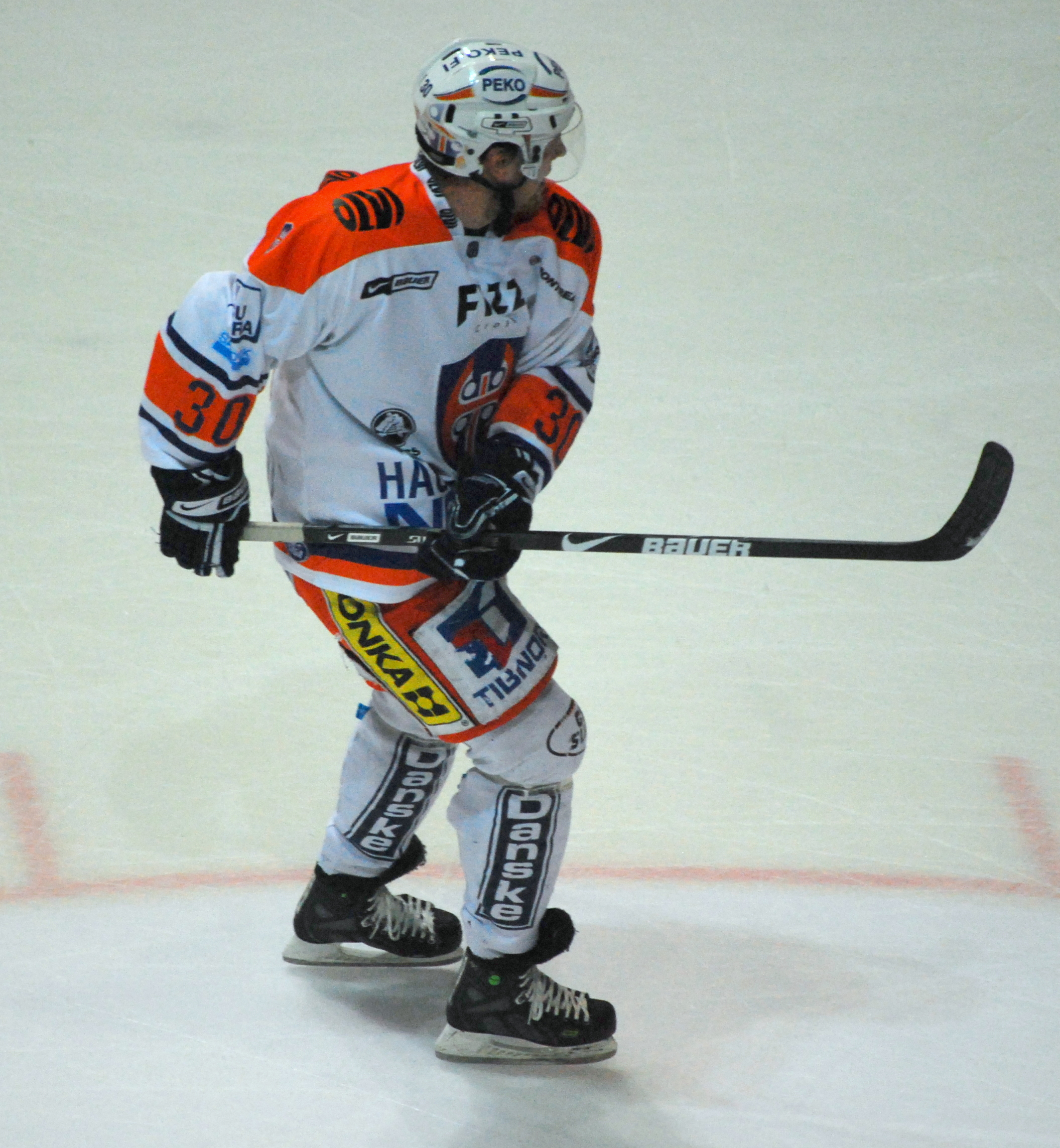
Ville Nieminen

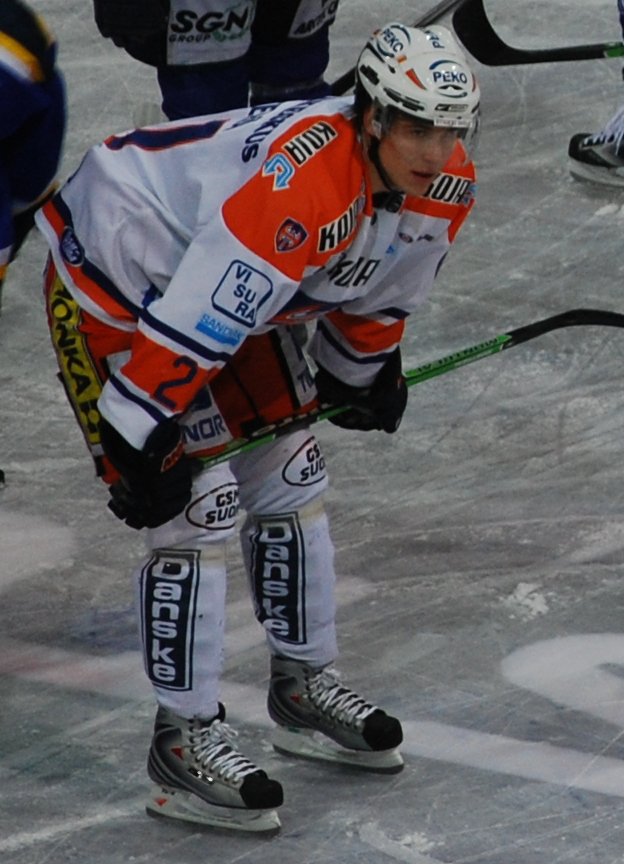
Jori Lehterä

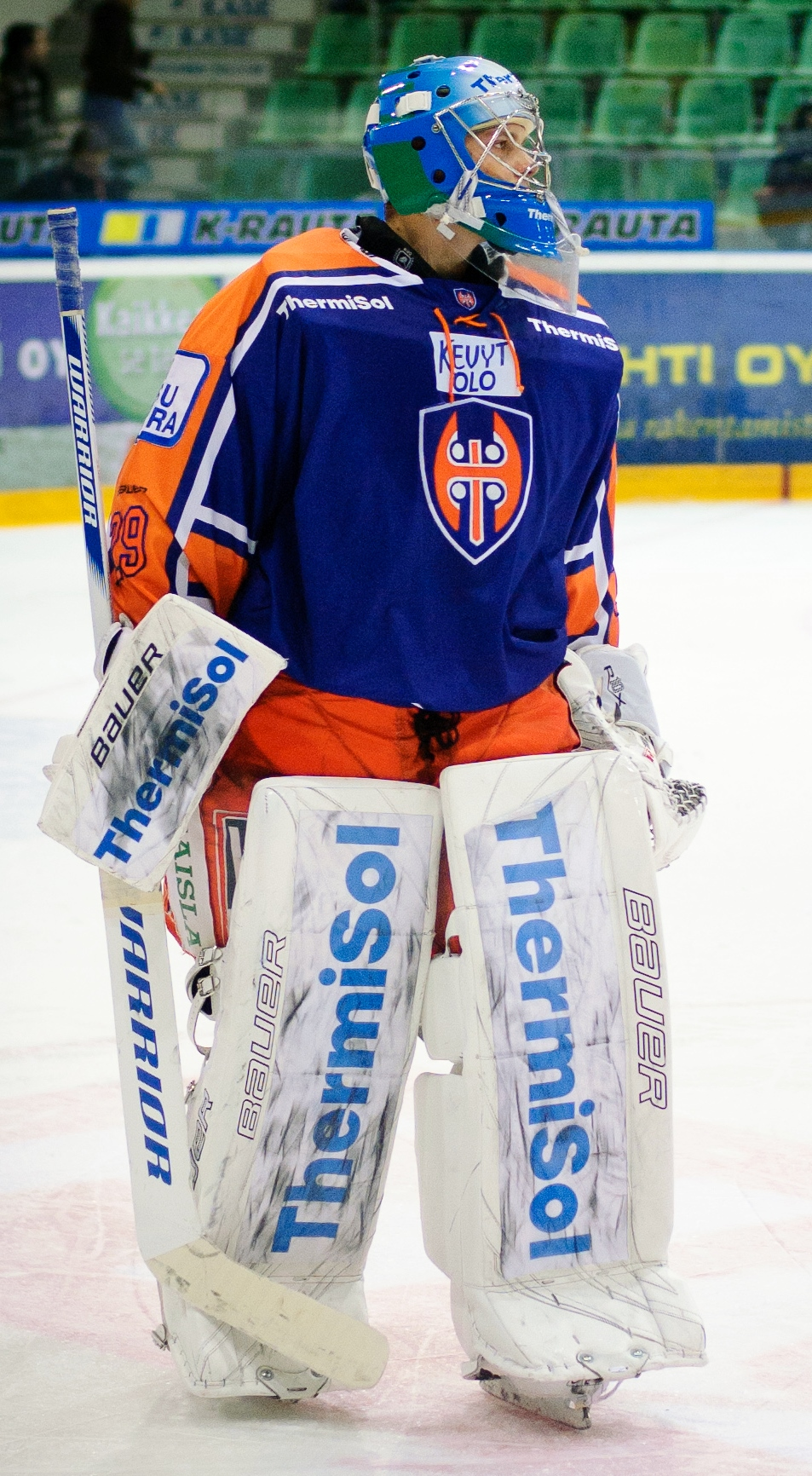
Harri Säteri

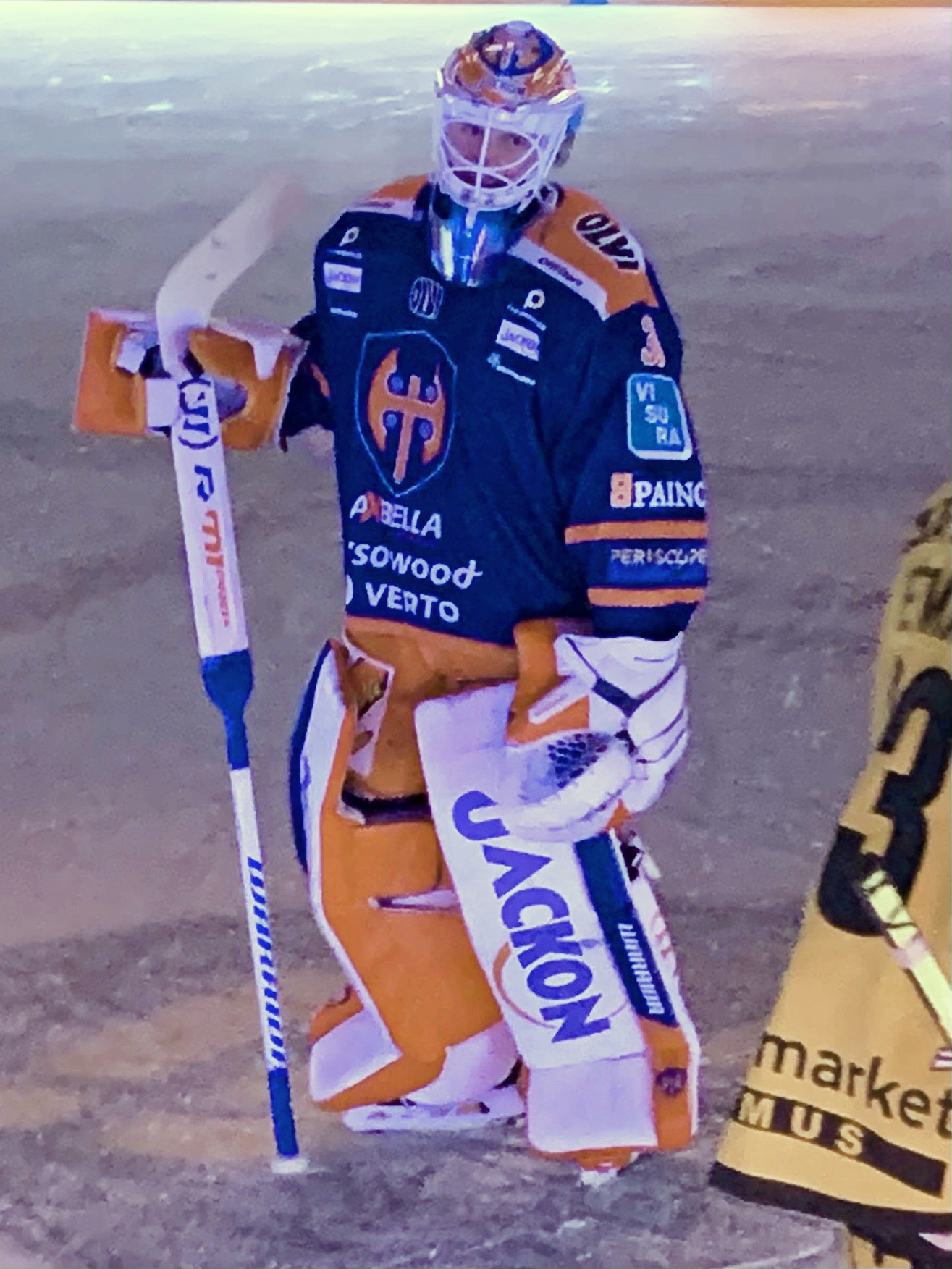
Christian Heljanko

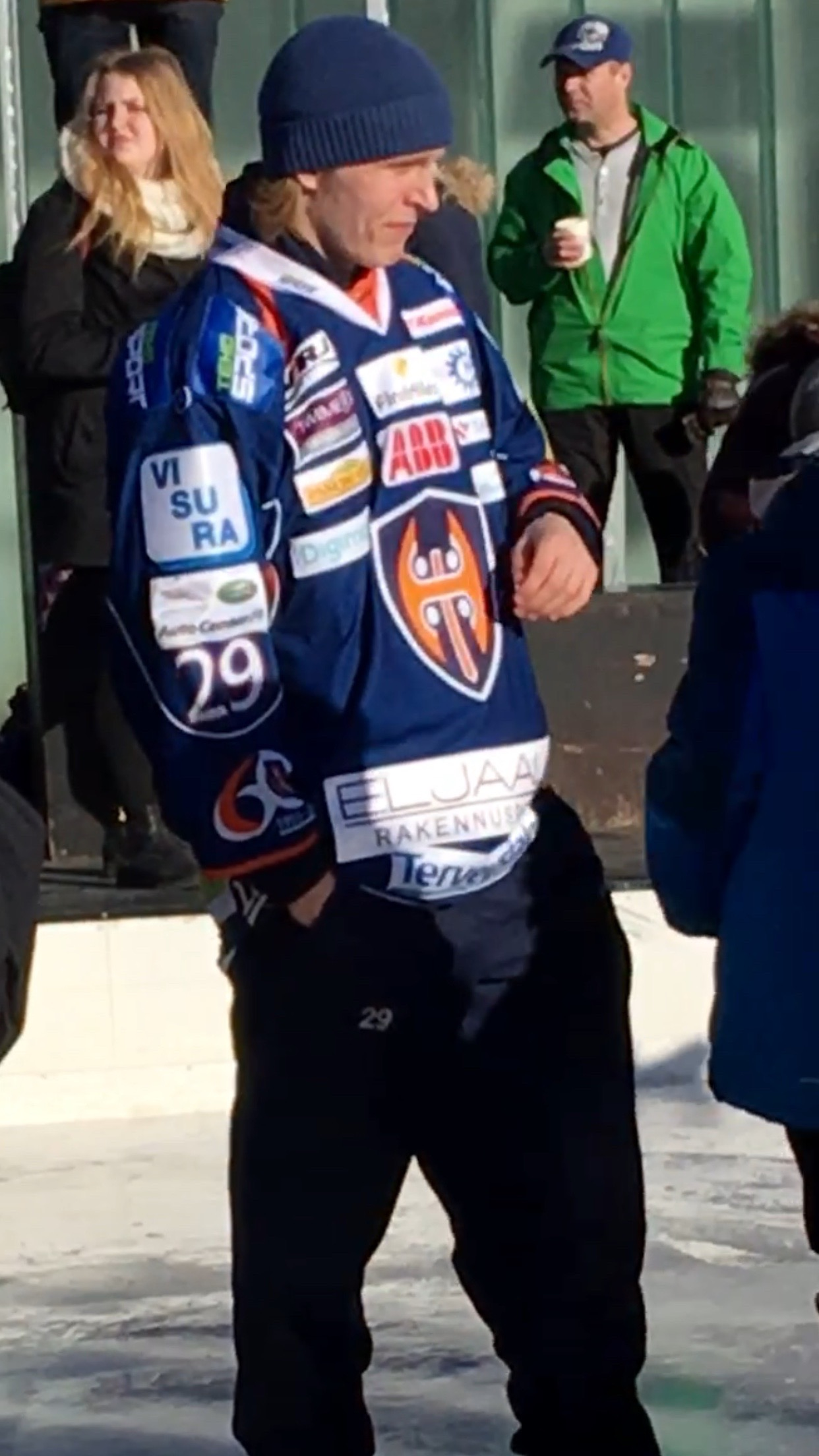
Patrik Laine

== Honours ==
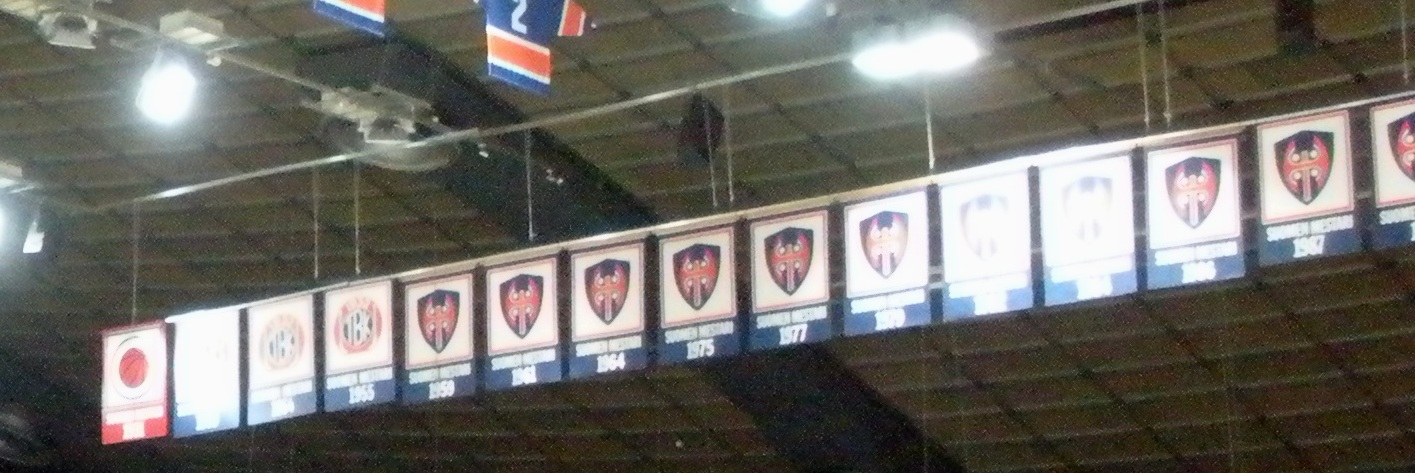
Tappara's SM-sarja/SM-liiga champion banners

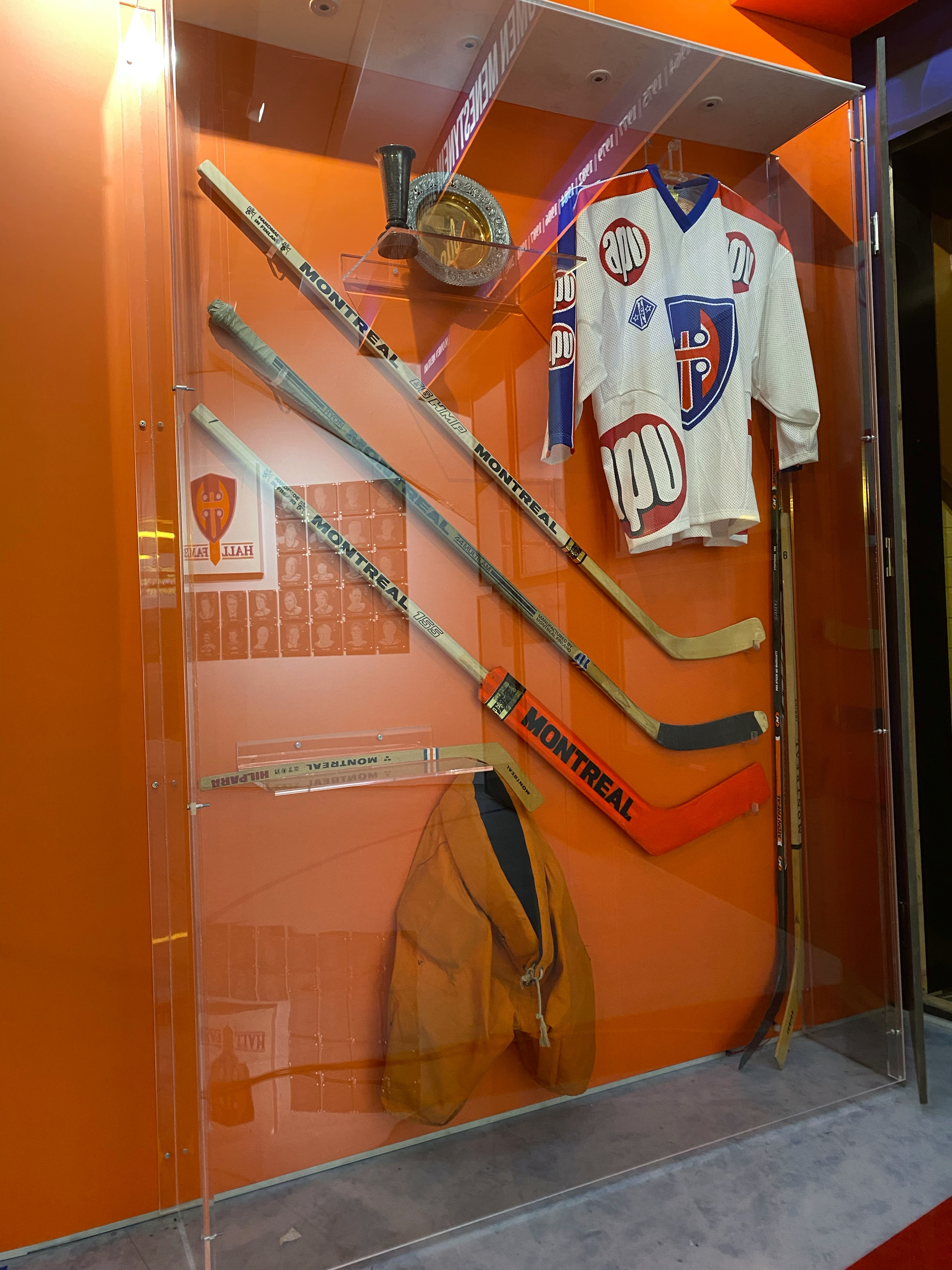
Tappara jersey and hockey equipments from 1980s

=== Champions ===
- (gold) SM-liiga Kanada-malja (14): 1977, 1979, 1982, 1984, 1986, 1987, 1988, 2003, 2016, 2017, 2022, 2023, 2024, 2026
- (gold) SM-sarja Kanada-malja (7): 1953, 1954, 1955, 1959, 1961, 1964, 1975
- (gold) Finnish Cup (1): 1957

=== Runners-up ===
- (silver) SM-liiga (9): (1976, 1978, 1981, 2001, 2002, 2013, 2014, 2015, 2018
- (silver) SM-sarja (4): 1958, 1960, 1963, 1974
- (bronze) SM-liiga (3): 1990, 2008, 2019
- (bronze) SM-sarja (9): 1946, 1947, 1948, 1950, 1951, 1956, 1957, 1962, 1973
- (silver) Finnish Cup (2): 1964, 1966

=== International ===
- (gold) Champions Hockey League (1): 2022–23
- (gold) Nordic Trophy (1): 2009
- (silver) Champions Hockey League (1): 2021–22
- (silver) IIHF European Cup (1): 1980
- (bronze) IIHF European Cup (2): 1983, 1988
- (gold) Tampere Cup (6): 1996, 1999, 2016, 2017, 2018, 2022

=== Retired numbers ===
- 2 - Kalevi Numminen
- 3 - Pekka Marjamäki
- 7 - Timo Jutila
- 8 - Janne Ojanen
- 10 - Timo Susi
- 12 - Erkki Lehtonen
- 71 - Kristian Kuusela

== Head coaches ==
- Jaakko Hietaniemi 1937–1950
- Jarl Ohlson 1950–61, 1965–66
- Aulis Hirvonen 1961–63
- Erkki Hytönen 1963-65
- Reijo Ojanen 1966-67
- Matti Haapaniemi 1967–68
- Esko Luostarinen 1968–1970
- Kalevi Numminen 1970–1979, 1991–1992
- Rauno Korpi 1979–1982, 1985–1991, 1997–1998
- Olli Hietanen 1982–1984
- Esko Niemi 1984
- Jorma Kurjenmäki 1984–1985
- Pertti Hasanen 1992–1993
- Boris Majorov 1993–1994
- Kaj Matalamäki 1994–1995, 2005
- Jukka Rautakorpi 1995–1997, 1999–2003, 2005–2006, 2012–2014, 2017–2020
- Ismo Läntinen 1998–1999
- Mika Saarinen 2003–2005
- Mikko Saarinen 2005, 2008–2010
- Rauli Urama 2006–2008
- Sami Hirvonen 2010–2011
- Risto Dufva 2011–2012
- Jussi Tapola 2014-2017, 2020–2023
- Rikard Grönborg 2023-2026
- Kari Jalonen 2026
- Fredrik Norrena 2026-present

== See also ==
- Ilves
- Koovee
