= 1979–80 IIHF European Cup =

European ice hockey tournament

The 1979–80 European Cup was the 15th edition of the European Cup, IIHF's premier European club ice hockey tournament. The season started on October 11, 1979, and finished on August 24, 1980.

The tournament was won by CSKA Moscow, who won the final group.

== First round ==
Team #1	Score	Team #2
Levski-Spartak Sofia (Bulgaria)	5–2, 1–1	(Hungary) Ferencvárosi TC
Dynamo Berlin (East Germany)	14–2, 9–2	(Denmark) Vojens IK
HC Bolzano (Italy)	5–7, 6–2	(Austria) EC KAC
HC Chamonix (France)	12–4, 8–0	(Spain) Casco Viejo Bilbao

(West Germany) Kölner EC, (Switzerland) SC Bern, (Socialist Federal Republic of Yugoslavia) HK Olimpija Ljubljana, (Netherlands) Flyers Heerenveen : bye

== Second round ==
Team #1	Score	Team #2
Kölner EC (West Germany)	9–6, 8–4	(Italy) HC Bolzano
SC Bern (Switzerland)	2–9, 5–5	(East Germany) Dynamo Berlin
HK Olimpija Ljubljana (Socialist Federal Republic of Yugoslavia)	8–5, 11–6	(Bulgaria) Levski-Spartak Sofia
Flyers Heerenveen (Netherlands)	9–2, 8–3	(France) HC Chamonix

(Finland) Tappara, (Sweden) Modo, (Czechoslovakia) Slovan Bratislava, (Soviet Union) CSKA Moscow : bye

== Third round ==
Team #1	Score	Team #2
HK Olimpija Ljubljana (Socialist Federal Republic of Yugoslavia)	2–7, 2–13	(Soviet Union) CSKA Moscow
Dynamo Berlin (East Germany)	5–5, 4–8	(Sweden) Modo
Flyers Heerenveen (Netherlands)	1–11, 9–6	(Czechoslovakia) Slovan Bratislava
Kölner EC (West Germany)	5–6, 6–10	(Finland) Tappara

== Final Group ==
(Innsbruck, Austria)

Team #1	Score	Team #2
CSKA Moscow (Soviet Union)	8–0	(Finland) Tappara
Slovan Bratislava (Czechoslovakia)	8–4	(Sweden) Modo
Tappara (Finland)	10–2	(Czechoslovakia) Slovan Bratislava
CSKA Moscow (Soviet Union)	7–1	(Sweden) Modo
Tappara (Finland)	13–3	(Sweden) Modo
CSKA Moscow (Soviet Union)	11–1	(Czechoslovakia) Slovan Bratislava

=== Final group standings ===
Rank	Team	Points
1	(Soviet Union) CSKA Moscow	6
2	(Finland) Tappara	4
3	(Czechoslovakia) Slovan Bratislava	2
4	(Sweden) Modo	0
