= 1985–86 IIHF European Cup =

European ice hockey tournament

The 1985–86 European Cup was the 21st edition of the European Cup, IIHF's premier European club ice hockey tournament. The season started on October 10, 1985, and finished on August 30, 1986.

The tournament was won by CSKA Moscow, who won the final group.

== Preliminary round ==
Team #1	Score	Team #2
Deko Builders Amsterdam (Netherlands)	10:1, 8:1	(Bulgaria) Slavia Sofia
Durham Wasps (United Kingdom)	6:7, 3:8	(Socialist Federal Republic of Yugoslavia) HK Jesenice

== First round ==
Team #1	Score	Team #2
Dynamo Berlin (East Germany)	11:1, 8:1	(Hungary) Újpesti Dózsa
SC Saint Gervais (France)	5:3, 3:3	(Poland) GKS Zagłębie Sosnowiec
HK Jesenice (Socialist Federal Republic of Yugoslavia)	5:8, 2:9	(Switzerland) HC Davos
CHH Txuri Urdin (Spain)	1:5, 0:18	(Italy) HC Bolzano
Deko Builders Amsterdam (Netherlands)	2:4, 5:9	(Austria) EC KAC

(Finland) Ilves, (Sweden) Södertälje SK, (West Germany) SB Rosenheim, (Czechoslovakia) Dukla Jihlava, (Soviet Union) CSKA Moscow : bye

== Second round ==
Team #1	Score	Team #2
HC Bolzano (Italy)	1:11, 2:11	(Soviet Union) CSKA Moscow
EC KAC (Austria)	1:4, 2:10	(Czechoslovakia) Dukla Jihlava
HC Davos (Switzerland)	5:9, 5:9	(Sweden) Södertälje SK
Dynamo Berlin (East Germany)	1:3, 4:3	(West Germany) SB Rosenheim
SC Saint Gervais (France)	w/o	(Finland) Ilves

== Final Group ==
(Rosenheim, Bavaria, West Germany)

Team #1	Score	Team #2
SB Rosenheim (West Germany)	1:3	(Sweden) Södertälje SK
Dukla Jihlava (Czechoslovakia)	10:2	(France) SC Saint Gervais
CSKA Moscow (Soviet Union)	10:2	(Sweden) Södertälje SK
SB Rosenheim (West Germany)	9:4	(France) SC Saint Gervais
CSKA Moscow (Soviet Union)	19:1	(France) SC Saint Gervais
SB Rosenheim (West Germany)	6:4	(Czechoslovakia) Dukla Jihlava
CSKA Moscow (Soviet Union)	9:3	(Czechoslovakia) Dukla Jihlava
Södertälje SK (Sweden)	11:0	(France) SC Saint Gervais
SB Rosenheim (West Germany)	0:8	(Soviet Union) CSKA Moscow
Södertälje SK (Sweden)	5:4	(Czechoslovakia) Dukla Jihlava

=== Final group standings ===
Rank	Team	Points
1	(Soviet Union) CSKA Moscow	8
2	(Sweden) Södertälje SK	6
3	(West Germany) SB Rosenheim	4
4	(Czechoslovakia) Dukla Jihlava	2
5	(France) SC Saint Gervais	0
