= 1994 IIHF European Cup =

European ice hockey tournament

The 1994 European Cup was the 30th edition of the European Cup, IIHF's premier European club ice hockey tournament. The season started on September 16, 1994, and finished on December 30, 1994.

The tournament was won by Jokerit, who beat Lada Togliatti in the final.

== Preliminary round ==
(Zagreb, Croatia)

Team #1	Score	Team #2
KHL Zagreb (Croatia)	26:1	(Turkey) Ankara Büyükşehir
SC Energija (Lithuania)	34:0	(Turkey) Ankara Büyükşehir
KHL Zagreb (Croatia)	1:2	(Lithuania) SC Energija

=== Standings ===
Rank	Team	Points
1	(Lithuania) SC Energija	4
2	(Croatia) KHL Zagreb	2
3	(Turkey) Ankara Büyükşehir	0

== First group round ==
=== Group A ===
(Tilburg, Netherlands)

Team #1	Score	Team #2
Cardiff Devils (United Kingdom)	6:2	(Ukraine) Sokil Kyiv
Tilburg Trappers (Netherlands)	2:6	(Kazakhstan) Torpedo Ust-Kamenogorsk
Torpedo Ust-Kamenogorsk (Kazakhstan)	5:3	(Ukraine) Sokil Kyiv
Tilburg Trappers (Netherlands)	7:4	(United Kingdom) Cardiff Devils
Tilburg Trappers (Netherlands)	3:8	(Ukraine) Sokil Kyiv
Cardiff Devils (United Kingdom)	4:3	(Kazakhstan) Torpedo Ust-Kamenogorsk

=== Group A standings ===
Rank	Team	Points
1	(United Kingdom) Cardiff Devils	4
2	(Kazakhstan) Torpedo Ust-Kamenogorsk	4
3	(Ukraine) Sokil Kyiv	2
4	(Netherlands) Tilburg Trappers	2

=== Group B ===
(Budapest, Hungary)

Team #1	Score	Team #2
HK Acroni Jesenice (Slovenia)	5:3	(Denmark) Herning IK
Ferencvárosi TC (Hungary)	3:4	(Romania) HC Steaua București
Ferencvárosi TC (Hungary)	2:7	(Denmark) Herning IK
HK Acroni Jesenice (Slovenia)	6:1	(Romania) HC Steaua București
HC Steaua București (Romania)	1:0	(Denmark) Herning IK
Ferencvárosi TC (Hungary)	3:6	(Slovenia) HK Acroni Jesenice

=== Group B standings ===
Rank	Team	Points
1	(Slovenia) HK Acroni Jesenice	6
2	(Romania) HC Steaua București	4
3	(Denmark) Herning IK	2
4	(Hungary) Ferencvárosi TC	0

=== Group C ===
(Riga, Latvia)

Team #1	Score	Team #2
Rouen HC (France)	12:1	(Estonia) Narva Kreenholm
Pārdaugava Rīga (Latvia)	7:0	(Lithuania) SC Energija
Rouen HC (France)	6:1	(Lithuania) SC Energija
Pārdaugava Rīga (Latvia)	5:2	(Estonia) Narva Kreenholm
Narva Kreenholm (Estonia)	3:2	(Lithuania) SC Energija
Pārdaugava Rīga (Latvia)	1:2	(France) Rouen HC

=== Group C standings ===
Rank	Team	Points
1	(France) Rouen HC	6
2	(Latvia) Pārdaugava Rīga	4
3	(Estonia) Narva Kreenholm	2
4	(Lithuania) SC Energija	0

=== Group D ===
(Nowy Targ, Poland)

Team #1	Score	Team #2
HC Dukla Trenčín (Slovakia)	9:0	(Croatia) KHL Zagreb
Podhale Nowy Targ (Poland)	18:1	(Bulgaria) Slavia Sofia
HC Dukla Trenčín (Slovakia)	31:0	(Bulgaria) Slavia Sofia
Podhale Nowy Targ (Poland)	12:2	(Croatia) KHL Zagreb
KHL Zagreb (Croatia)	5:2	(Bulgaria) Slavia Sofia
Podhale Nowy Targ (Poland)	4:7	(Slovakia) HC Dukla Trenčín

=== Group D standings ===
Rank	Team	Points
1	(Slovakia) HC Dukla Trenčín	6
2	(Poland) Podhale Nowy Targ	4
3	(Croatia) KHL Zagreb	2
4	(Bulgaria) Slavia Sofia	0

=== Group E ===
(Feldkirch, Vorarlberg, Austria)

Team #1	Score	Team #2
EHC Kloten (Switzerland)	19:3	(Spain) CH Jaca
VEU Feldkirch (Austria)	4:2	(Norway) Lillehammer IK
VEU Feldkirch (Austria)	17:2	(Spain) CH Jaca
EHC Kloten (Switzerland)	3:2	(Norway) Lillehammer IK
Lillehammer IK (Norway)	15:3	(Spain) CH Jaca
VEU Feldkirch (Austria)	2:2	(Switzerland) EHC Kloten

=== Group E standings ===
Rank	Team	Points
1	(Switzerland) EHC Kloten	5
2	(Austria) VEU Feldkirch	5
3	(Norway) Lillehammer IK	2
4	(Spain) CH Jaca	0

(Czech Republic) HC Olomouc, (Italy) HC Devils Milano, (Belarus) Tivali Minsk, (Germany) EC Hedos München, (Russia) Lada Togliatti, (Sweden) Malmö IF : bye

== Second group round ==
=== Group F ===
(Olomouc, Czech Republic)

Team #1	Score	Team #2
Lada Togliatti (Russia)	9:1	(Kazakhstan) Torpedo Ust-Kamenogorsk
HC Olomouc (Czech Republic)	9:0	(Romania) HC Steaua București
Lada Togliatti (Russia)	13:1	(Romania) HC Steaua București
HC Olomouc (Czech Republic)	7:4	(Kazakhstan) Torpedo Ust-Kamenogorsk
Torpedo Ust-Kamenogorsk (Kazakhstan)	6:4	(Romania) HC Steaua București
HC Olomouc (Czech Republic)	4:4	(Russia) Lada Togliatti

=== Group F standings ===
Rank	Team	Points
1	(Russia) Lada Togliatti	5
2	(Czech Republic) HC Olomouc	5
3	(Kazakhstan) Torpedo Ust-Kamenogorsk	2
4	(Romania) HC Steaua București	0

=== Group G ===
(München, Bavaria, Germany)

Team #1	Score	Team #2
EHC Kloten (Switzerland)	3:2	(Italy) HC Devils Milano
EC Hedos München (Germany)	5:3	(Latvia) Pārdaugava Rīga
EC Hedos München (Germany)	4:3	(Italy) HC Devils Milano
EHC Kloten (Switzerland)	10:1	(Latvia) Pārdaugava Rīga
EC Hedos München (Germany)	4:2	(Switzerland) EHC Kloten
Pārdaugava Rīga (Latvia)	5:3	(Italy) HC Devils Milano

=== Group G standings ===
Rank	Team	Points
1	(Germany) EC Hedos München *	6
2	(Switzerland) EHC Kloten *	4
3	(Latvia) Pārdaugava Rīga	2
4	(Italy) HC Devils Milano	0

* (Germany) EC Hedos München went bankrupt after this group stage and were later dissolved. (Switzerland) EHC Kloten declinded to take their spot.

=== Group H ===
(Minsk, Belarus)

Team #1	Score	Team #2
HC Dukla Trenčín (Slovakia)	13:2	(United Kingdom) Cardiff Devils
Tivali Minsk (Belarus)	5:2	(Austria) VEU Feldkirch
HC Dukla Trenčín (Slovakia)	4:1	(Austria) VEU Feldkirch
Tivali Minsk (Belarus)	14:0	(United Kingdom) Cardiff Devils
VEU Feldkirch (Austria)	13:1	(United Kingdom) Cardiff Devils
Tivali Minsk (Belarus)	1:1	(Slovakia) HC Dukla Trenčín

=== Group H standings ===
Rank	Team	Points
1	(Belarus) Tivali Minsk	5
2	(Slovakia) HC Dukla Trenčín	5
3	(Austria) VEU Feldkirch	2
4	(United Kingdom) Cardiff Devils	0

=== Group J ===
(Kristianstad, Sweden)

Team #1	Score	Team #2
Malmö IF (Sweden)	8:2	(Slovenia) HK Acroni Jesenice
Rouen HC (France)	5:0	(Poland) Podhale Nowy Targ
Malmö IF (Sweden)	9:2	(Poland) Podhale Nowy Targ
Rouen HC (France)	13:0	(Slovenia) HK Acroni Jesenice
HK Acroni Jesenice (Slovenia)	7:5	(Poland) Podhale Nowy Targ
Malmö IF (Sweden)	4:1	(France) Rouen HC

=== Group J standings ===
Rank	Team	Points
1	(Sweden) Malmö IF	6
2	(France) Rouen HC	4
3	(Slovenia) HK Acroni Jesenice	2
4	(Poland) Podhale Nowy Targ	0

* (France) Rouen HC forfeit the tournament

(Finland) TPS, (Finland) Jokerit : bye

== Final stage ==
(Turku, Finland)

=== Group A ===
Team #1	Score	Team #2
Malmö IF (Sweden)	4:2	(Slovakia) HC Dukla Trenčín
TPS (Finland)	3:3	(Russia) Lada Togliatti
Lada Togliatti (Russia)	3:1	(Sweden) Malmö IF
TPS (Finland)	5:0	(Slovakia) HC Dukla Trenčín
Lada Togliatti (Russia)	9:2	(Slovakia) HC Dukla Trenčín
TPS (Finland)	4:1	(Sweden) Malmö IF

=== Group A standings ===
Rank	Team	Points
1	(Russia) Lada Togliatti	5
2	(Finland) TPS	5
3	(Sweden) Malmö IF	2
4	(Slovakia) HC Dukla Trenčín	0

=== Group B ===
Team #1	Score	Team #2
Jokerit (Finland)	6:1	(Czech Republic) HC Olomouc
Tivali Minsk (Belarus)	4:3	(Latvia) Pārdaugava Rīga
Pārdaugava Rīga (Latvia)	2:1	(Czech Republic) HC Olomouc
Jokerit (Finland)	3:1	(Belarus) Tivali Minsk
HC Olomouc (Czech Republic)	3:1	(Belarus) Tivali Minsk
Jokerit (Finland)	9:4	(Latvia) Pārdaugava Rīga

=== Group B standings ===
Rank	Team	Points
1	(Finland) Jokerit	6
2	(Czech Republic) HC Olomouc	2
3	(Latvia) Pārdaugava Rīga	2
4	(Belarus) Tivali Minsk	2

=== Third place match ===
Team #1	Score	Team #2
TPS (Finland)	8:1	(Czech Republic) HC Olomouc

=== Final ===
Team #1	Score	Team #2
Jokerit (Finland)	4:2	(Russia) Lada Togliatti
