= 1991–92 Latvian Hockey League season =

1991–92 Latvian Hockey League
- League: Latvian Hockey Higher League
- Sport: Ice hockey
- Teams: 14

Regular season
- Champions: HK Sāga Ķekava Riga
- Runners-up: Pārdaugava Riga

Latvian Hockey League seasons
- first 1992–93 →

The 1991–92 Latvian Hockey League season was the first season of the Latvian Hockey League, the top level of ice hockey in Latvia. Fourteen teams participated in the league, and HK Sāga Ķekava Riga won the championship.

== First round ==
=== Group A ===
	Club	GP	W	T	L	GF:GA	Pts
1.	Pārdaugava Riga	6	5	1	0	61:13	11
2.	HK Sauriesi Riga	6	5	1	0	60:18	11
3.	RTU Hanza Riga	6	4	0	2	74:21	8
4.	HK Cesis Vendenieki	6	3	0	3	62:36	6
5.	HK Valmiera	6	2	0	4	31:59	4
6.	HK Polaks Engure	6	1	0	5	23:90	2
7.	HK Smiltene	6	0	0	6	10:84	0

=== Group B ===
	Club	GP	W	T	L	GF:GA	Pts
1.	HK Sāga Ķekava Riga	6	5	1	0	95:16	11
2.	Latvijas Sport Akademia Riga	6	4	1	1	77:31	9
3.	HK Vecmeistars Riga	6	4	1	1	75:30	9
4.	Pārdaugava Riga II	6	3	1	2	55:44	7
5.	HK Ogres Lauktehnika	6	2	0	4	35:77	4
6.	HK Starts Broceni	6	1	0	5	23:76	2
7.	HK Plavinas NIK	6	0	0	6	17:103	0

== Second round ==
=== Final round ===
	Club	GP	W	T	L	GF:GA	Pts
1.	HK Sāga Ķekava Riga	14	11	1	2	137:65	23
2.	Pārdaugava Riga	14	10	3	1	119:44	23
3.	HK Sauriesi Riga	14	8	2	4	78:56	18
4.	RTU Hanza Riga	14	8	2	4	83:59	18
5.	HK Vecmeistars Riga	14	6	1	7	70:76	13
6.	Latvijas Sport Akademia Riga	14	4	0	10	60:99	8
7.	HK Cesis Vendenieki	14	3	1	10	67:119	7
8.	Pārdaugava Riga II	14	1	1	12	51:147	3

=== Final ===
- HK Sāga Ķekava Riga – Pārdaugava Riga 8:6

=== Placing round ===
	Club	GP	W	T	L	GF:GA	Pts
9.	HK Valmiera	10	8	0	2	75:45	16
10.	HK Ogres Lauktehnika	10	6	0	4	78:62	12
11.	HK Polaks Engure	10	6	0	4	58:56	12
12.	HK Plavinas NIK	10	5	1	4	50:53	11
13.	HK Smiltene	10	3	1	6	31:51	7
14.	HK Starts Broceni	10	1	0	9	48:73	2
