= 1982–83 IIHF European Cup =

European ice hockey tournament

The 1982–83 European Cup was the 18th edition of the European Cup, IIHF's premier European club ice hockey tournament. The season started on October 12, 1982, and finished on August 28, 1983.

The tournament was won by CSKA Moscow, who won the final group.

== First round ==
Team #1	Score	Team #2
Casco Viejo Bilbao (Spain)	7:2, 6:4	(France) CSG Grenoble
HC Steaua București (Romania)	11:5, 3:2	(Hungary) Újpesti Dózsa
Vålerenga (Norway)	2:6, 2:16	(East Germany) Dynamo Berlin
VEU Feldkirch (Austria)	4:2, 2:4 (3:4 PS)	(Switzerland) EHC Arosa

(Socialist Federal Republic of Yugoslavia) HK Jesenice, (Italy) HC Bolzano, (Netherlands) Flyers Heerenveen, (Sweden) AIK : bye

== Second round ==
Team #1	Score	Team #2
Casco Viejo Bilbao (Spain)	8:11, 1:9	(Netherlands) Flyers Heerenveen
AIK (Sweden)	7:2, 5:9	(East Germany) Dynamo Berlin
HC Bolzano (Italy)	5:1, 3:0	(Romania) HC Steaua București
HK Jesenice (Socialist Federal Republic of Yugoslavia)	2:6, 7:9	(Switzerland) EHC Arosa

(Finland) Tappara, (West Germany) SB Rosenheim, (Czechoslovakia) Dukla Jihlava, (Soviet Union) CSKA Moscow : bye

== Third round ==
Team #1	Score	Team #2
HC Bolzano (Italy)	2:11, 1:12	(Soviet Union) CSKA Moscow
Flyers Heerenveen (Netherlands)	2:11, 3:5	(Finland) Tappara
AIK (Sweden)	6:3, 4:8	(West Germany) SB Rosenheim
EHC Arosa (Switzerland)	1:3, 2:4	(Czechoslovakia) Dukla Jihlava

== Final Group ==
(Tampere, Finland)

Team #1	Score	Team #2
Tappara (Finland)	3:3	(Czechoslovakia) Dukla Jihlava
CSKA Moscow (Soviet Union)	5:1	(West Germany) SB Rosenheim
CSKA Moscow (Soviet Union)	3:1	(Czechoslovakia) Dukla Jihlava
Tappara (Finland)	3:3	(West Germany) SB Rosenheim
Dukla Jihlava (Czechoslovakia)	5:0	(West Germany) SB Rosenheim
Tappara (Finland)	0:6	(Soviet Union) CSKA Moscow

=== Final group standings ===
Rank	Team	Points
1	(Soviet Union) CSKA Moscow	6
2	(Czechoslovakia) Dukla Jihlava	3
3	(Finland) Tappara	2
4	(West Germany) SB Rosenheim	1
