= 1981–82 IIHF European Cup =

European ice hockey tournament

The 1981–82 European Cup was the 17th edition of the European Cup, IIHF's premier European club ice hockey tournament. The season started on October 7, 1981, and finished on August 29, 1982.

The tournament was won by CSKA Moscow, who won the final group.

== First round ==
Team #1	Score	Team #2
Stjernen (Norway)	8:1, 8:2	(Denmark) Aalborg IK
Zagłębie Sosnowiec (Poland)	7:3, 8:2	(Romania) HC Steaua București
Flyers Heerenveen (Netherlands)	4:0, 4:2	(Hungary) Székesfehérvári Volán
EC Villacher SV (Austria)	4:5, 2:2	(Italy) HC Gherdëina
HK Jesenice (Socialist Federal Republic of Yugoslavia)	3:7, 2:6	(Switzerland) EHC Biel
CSG Grenoble (France)	6:2, 3:1	(Spain) Casco Viejo Bilbao

(East Germany) SG Dynamo Weißwasser, (West Germany) SC Riessersee : bye

== Second round ==
Team #1	Score	Team #2
Zagłębie Sosnowiec (Poland)	5:2, 5:7	(Netherlands) Flyers Heerenveen
Stjernen (Norway)	2:3, 3:6	(East Germany) SG Dynamo Weißwasser
HC Gherdëina (Italy)	w/o	(Switzerland) EHC Biel
CSG Grenoble (France)	1:8, 4:11	(West Germany) SC Riessersee

(Finland) Kärpät, (Sweden) Färjestads BK, (Czechoslovakia) TJ Vítkovice, (Soviet Union) CSKA Moscow : bye

== Third round ==
Team #1	Score	Team #2
HC Gherdëina (Italy)	0:7, 6:11	(Czechoslovakia) TJ Vítkovice
SC Riessersee (West Germany)	7:4, 3:1	(Sweden) Färjestads BK
SG Dynamo Weißwasser (East Germany)	3:12, 0:7	(Soviet Union) CSKA Moscow
Kärpät (Finland)	w/o	(Poland) Zagłębie Sosnowiec

== Final Group ==
(Düsseldorf, North Rhine-Westphalia, West Germany)

Team #1	Score	Team #2
SC Riessersee (West Germany)	0:3	(Czechoslovakia) TJ Vítkovice
CSKA Moscow (Soviet Union)	13:2	(Finland) Kärpät
SC Riessersee (West Germany)	1:14	(Soviet Union) CSKA Moscow
TJ Vítkovice (Czechoslovakia)	3:1	(Finland) Kärpät
SC Riessersee (West Germany)	6:4	(Finland) Kärpät
CSKA Moscow (Soviet Union)	4:3	(Czechoslovakia) TJ Vitkovice

=== Final group standings ===
Rank	Team	Points
1	(Soviet Union) CSKA Moscow	6
2	(Czechoslovakia) TJ Vitkovice	4
3	(West Germany) SC Riessersee	2
4	(Finland) Kärpät	0
