= 1992–93 Latvian Hockey League season =

1992–93 Latvian Hockey League
- League: Latvian Hockey Higher League
- Sport: Ice hockey
- Number of teams: 15

Regular season
- Champions: Pārdaugava Riga
- Runners-up: Latvijas zelts Riga

Latvian Hockey League seasons
- ← 1991–92 1993–94 →

The 1992–93 Latvian Hockey League season was the second season of the Latvian Hockey League, the top level of ice hockey in Latvia. Fifteen teams participated in the league, and Pārdaugava Riga won the championship.

== Regular season ==
=== Group A ===
	Club	GP	W	T	L	GF:GA	Pts
1.	RTU-Hanza Riga	6	6	0	0	86:22	12
2.	HK Sāga Ķekava Riga	6	4	1	1	95:23	9
3.	Dinamo Juniors Riga	6	4	1	1	71:14	9
4.	Essamika Ogre	6	3	0	3	53:36	6
5.	LJS-Hanza Riga	6	2	0	4	28:61	4
6.	Vecmeistars Riga	6	1	0	5	26:73	2
7.	Polaks Engure	6	0	0	6	14:144	0

=== Group B ===
	Club	GP	W	T	L	GF:GA	Pts
1.	Pārdaugava Riga	7	5	1	1	123:20	11
2.	Pārdaugava Riga II	7	5	1	1	75:37	11
3.	Latvijas zelts Riga	7	5	1	1	114:24	11
4.	HK Nik's Brih Riga	7	5	0	2	80:31	10
5.	HK Valmiera	7	3	0	4	32:91	6
6.	THK Talsi	7	2	0	5	40:120	4
7.	Dispeceri Riga	7	1	1	5	27:89	3
8.	Smiltenes vanagi	7	0	0	7	8:87	0

== Second round ==
=== Final round ===
	Club	GP	W	T	L	GF:GA	Pts
1.	Pārdaugava Riga	21	16	2	3	175:67	34
2.	Latvijas zelts Riga	21	15	2	4	194:101	32
3.	Pārdaugava Riga II	21	15	2	4	161:125	32
4.	HK Nik's Brih Riga	21	13	0	8	170:113	26
5.	HK Sāga Ķekava Riga	21	9	1	11	158:169	19
6.	RTU-Hanza Riga	21	7	0	14	114:195	14
7.	Dinamo Juniors Riga	21	3	1	17	74:165	7
8.	Essamika Ogre	21	2	0	19	102:213	4

=== Placing round ===
	Club	GP	W	T	L	GF:GA	Pts
1.	Vecmeistars Riga	14	9	1	4	112:139	19
2.	HK Valmiera	15	8	3	4	111:157	19
3.	LJS-Hanza Riga	14	8	2	4	91:111	18
4.	THK Talsi	15	8	1	6	119:193	17
5.	Dispeceri Riga	15	7	1	7	103:164	15
6.	Smiltenes vanagi	15	4	3	8	69:157	11
7.	Polaks Engure	14	1	1	12	61:235	3
