= 1988–89 IIHF European Cup =

European ice hockey tournament

The 1988–89 European Cup was the 24th edition of the European Cup, IIHF's premier European club ice hockey tournament. The season started on October 2, 1988, and finished on February 19, 1989.

The tournament was won by CSKA Moscow, who won the final group.

== Preliminary round ==
Team #1	Score	Team #2
Slavia Sofia (Bulgaria)	5:6, 1:5	(Socialist Federal Republic of Yugoslavia) HK Jesenice
Murrayfield Racers (United Kingdom)	6:8, 9:10	(Hungary) Újpesti TE

== Group round ==
=== Group A ===
(Esbjerg, Denmark)

Team #1	Score	Team #2
CSKA Moscow (Soviet Union)	11:1	(East Germany) Dynamo Berlin
Esbjerg IK (Denmark)	2:4	(Hungary) Újpesti TE
CSKA Moscow (Soviet Union)	23:2	(Hungary) Újpesti TE
Esbjerg IK (Denmark)	3:8	(East Germany) Dynamo Berlin
Dynamo Berlin (East Germany)	7:3	(Hungary) Újpesti TE
Esbjerg IK (Denmark)	1:21	(Soviet Union) CSKA Moscow

=== Group A standings ===
Rank	Team	Points
1	(Soviet Union) CSKA Moscow	6
2	(East Germany) Dynamo Berlin	4
3	(Hungary) Újpesti TE	2
4	(Denmark) Esbjerg IK	0

=== Group B ===
(Nijmegen, Netherlands)

Team #1	Score	Team #2
TJ VSŽ Košice (Czechoslovakia)	8:2	(Romania) HC Steaua București
Spitman Nijmegen (Netherlands)	7:2	(Norway) Vålerenga IF
TJ VSŽ Košice (Czechoslovakia)	7:1	(Norway) Vålerenga IF
Spitman Nijmegen (Netherlands)	3:2	(Romania) HC Steaua București
HC Steaua București (Romania)	6:5	(Norway) Vålerenga IF
Spitman Nijmegen (Netherlands)	3:14	(Czechoslovakia) TJ VSŽ Košice

=== Group B standings ===
Rank	Team	Points
1	(Czechoslovakia) TJ VSŽ Košice	6
2	(Netherlands) Spitman Nijmegen	4
3	(Romania) HC Steaua București	2
4	(Norway) Vålerenga IF	0

=== Group C ===
(Klagenfurt, Carinthia, Austria)

Team #1	Score	Team #2
EC KAC (Austria)	5:2	(France) Mont-Blanc
Färjestads BK (Sweden)	4:0	(Poland) TMH Polonia Bytom
Färjestads BK (Sweden)	13:1	(France) Mont-Blanc
EC KAC (Austria)	5:6	(Poland) TMH Polonia Bytom
TMH Polonia Bytom (Poland)	7:5	(France) Mont-Blanc
EC KAC (Austria)	2:6	(Sweden) Färjestads BK

=== Group C standings ===
Rank	Team	Points
1	(Sweden) Färjestads BK	6
2	(Poland) TMH Polonia Bytom	4
3	(Austria) EC KAC	2
4	(France) Mont-Blanc	0

=== Group D ===
(Lugano, Ticino, Switzerland)

Team #1	Score	Team #2
Kölner EC (West Germany)	6:1	(Socialist Federal Republic of Yugoslavia) HK Jesenice
HC Lugano (Switzerland)	3:2	(Italy) HC Bolzano
HC Lugano (Switzerland)	8:0	(Socialist Federal Republic of Yugoslavia) HK Jesenice
Kölner EC (West Germany)	10:1	(Italy) HC Bolzano
HC Bolzano (Italy)	6:2	(Socialist Federal Republic of Yugoslavia) HK Jesenice
HC Lugano (Switzerland)	3:4	(West Germany) Kölner EC

=== Group D standings ===
Rank	Team	Points
1	(West Germany) Kölner EC	6
2	(Switzerland) HC Lugano	4
3	(Italy) HC Bolzano	2
4	(Socialist Federal Republic of Yugoslavia) HK Jesenice	0

== Final Group ==
(Cologne, North Rhine-Westphalia, West Germany)

Team #1	Score	Team #2
Färjestads BK (Sweden)	4:3	(Soviet Union) CSKA Moscow
Kölner EC (West Germany)	3:5	(Czechoslovakia) TJ VSŽ Košice
Kölner EC (West Germany)	7:3	(Sweden) Färjestads BK
CSKA Moscow (Soviet Union)	6:2	(Czechoslovakia) TJ VSŽ Košice
Kölner EC (West Germany)	1:9	(Soviet Union) CSKA Moscow
TJ VSŽ Košice (Czechoslovakia)	4:3	(Sweden) Färjestads BK

=== Final group standings ===
Rank	Team	Points
1	(Soviet Union) CSKA Moscow	4
2	(Czechoslovakia) TJ VSŽ Košice	4
3	(West Germany) Kölner EC	2
4	(Sweden) Färjestads BK	2
