= IIHF European Cup =

European ice hockey tournament

- Sport: Ice hockey
- Founded: 1965
- Founder: IIHF
- First season: 1965–66
- Folded: 1996
- No. of teams: 14–31
- Countries: 34
- Continent: Europe
- Most titles: (Soviet Union) CSKA Moscow (20 titles)

The IIHF European Cup, also known as the Europa Cup, was a European ice hockey club competition for champions of national leagues which was contested between 1965 and 1997, governed by the International Ice Hockey Federation (IIHF).

== History ==
The competition was originated by Günther Sabetzki, based on the European Cup of association football (now UEFA Champions League).

The tournament encountered problems. Countries had different levels of development in ice hockey, so some teams were weaker than others, resulting in a number of uncompetitive, one-sided games. Organisational difficulties were also posed by the refusal of some Soviet Union teams to play away games in certain places. This resulted in no final being held some years, and more than one final being held in others. The competition was discontinued after 1997. In its place, the European Hockey League and the Continental Cup, and later the IIHF European Champions Cup, were started.

== Format ==
Teams were seeded and drawn into groups of four teams, with the winners of each group progressing to the next round, where they were drawn into groups again. Each round was played over a long weekend (Friday to Sunday) in a single venue, until one final group was left, the winner of which would be considered the champion. After the European Cup was discontinued, the Continental Cup would adopt this format.

== Winners ==
=== Knockout, 1965/66–1977/78 ===
Season	Winner	Score	Runner-up	Semifinals
1965–66	(Czechoslovakia) ZKL Brno	6–4, 7–5, 6–2, 6–1	(West Germany) EV Füssen	(Austria) EC KAC (Norway) Vålerenga
1966–67	(Czechoslovakia) ZKL Brno	3–2, 5–4	(Finland) Ilves	(Austria) EC KAC (Soviet Union) CSKA Moscow (w/o)
1967–68	(Czechoslovakia) ZKL Brno	3–0, 3–3	(Czechoslovakia) Dukla Jihlava	(Austria) EC KAC (East Germany) SC Dynamo Berlin
1968–69	(Soviet Union) CSKA Moscow	9–1, 14–3	(Austria) EC KAC	(East Germany) SC Dynamo Berlin (Czechoslovakia) ZKL Brno (w/o)
1969–70	(Soviet Union) CSKA Moscow	2–3, 8–5	(Soviet Union) Spartak Moscow	(Sweden) Leksands IF (Czechoslovakia) Dukla Jihlava
1970–71	(Soviet Union) CSKA Moscow	7–0, 3–3	(Czechoslovakia) Dukla Jihlava	(Italy) SG Cortina (Sweden) Brynäs IF
1971–72	(Soviet Union) CSKA Moscow	8–2, 8–3	(Sweden) Brynäs	(East Germany) SG Dynamo Weißwasser (Czechoslovakia) Dukla Jihlava
1972–73	(Soviet Union) CSKA Moscow	6–2, 12–2	(Sweden) Brynäs	(West Germany) Düsseldorfer EG (Czechoslovakia) Dukla Jihlava
1973–74	(Soviet Union) CSKA Moscow	2–3, 6–1	(Czechoslovakia) Tesla Pardubice	(Netherlands) Tilburg Trappers
1974–75	(Soviet Union) Krylya Sovetov Moscow	2–3, 7–0	(Czechoslovakia) Dukla Jihlava	(East Germany) SG Dynamo Weißwasser (Finland) HIFK
1975–76	(Soviet Union) CSKA Moscow	6–0, 4–2	(Czechoslovakia) Poldi Kladno	(West Germany) Düsseldorfer EG (Finland) Tappara
1976–77	(Czechoslovakia) Poldi Kladno	4–4, 4–4 (2–1 SO)	(Soviet Union) Spartak Moscow	(Sweden) Brynäs IF (Finland) TPS
1977–78	(Soviet Union) CSKA Moscow	3–1	(Czechoslovakia) Poldi Kladno	(East Germany) SC Dynamo Berlin

=== Group, 1978/79–1989/90 ===
Season	Winner	Runner-up	Third	Venue
1978–79	(Soviet Union) CSKA Moscow	(Czechoslovakia) Poldi Kladno	(Finland) Ässät	Innsbruck, Austria
1979–80	(Soviet Union) CSKA Moscow	(Finland) Tappara	(Czechoslovakia) Slovan Bratislava	Innsbruck, Austria
1980–81	(Soviet Union) CSKA Moscow	(Finland) HIFK	(Czechoslovakia) Poldi Kladno	Urtijëi, Italy
1981–82	(Soviet Union) CSKA Moscow	(Czechoslovakia) TJ Vítkovice	(West Germany) SC Riessersee	Düsseldorf, West Germany
1982–83	(Soviet Union) CSKA Moscow	(Czechoslovakia) Dukla Jihlava	(Finland) Tappara	Tampere, Finland
1983–84	(Soviet Union) CSKA Moscow	(Czechoslovakia) Dukla Jihlava	(East Germany) SC Dynamo Berlin	Urtijëi, Italy
1984–85	(Soviet Union) CSKA Moscow	(West Germany) Kölner EC	(Czechoslovakia) Dukla Jihlava	Megève, France
1985–86	(Soviet Union) CSKA Moscow	(Sweden) Södertälje SK	(West Germany) SB Rosenheim	Rosenheim, West Germany
1986–87	(Soviet Union) CSKA Moscow	(Czechoslovakia) TJ VSŽ Košice	(Sweden) Färjestad BK	Lugano, Switzerland
1987–88	(Soviet Union) CSKA Moscow	(Czechoslovakia) Tesla Pardubice	(Finland) Tappara	Davos, Switzerland
1988–89	(Soviet Union) CSKA Moscow	(Czechoslovakia) TJ VSŽ Košice	(West Germany) Kölner EC	Cologne, West Germany
1989–90	(Soviet Union) CSKA Moscow	(Finland) TPS	(Sweden) Djurgårdens IF	West Berlin, West Germany

=== Knockout, 1990–1996 ===
Season	Winner	Score	Runner-up	Third	Venue
1990	(Sweden) Djurgårdens IF	3–2	(Soviet Union) Dynamo Moscow	(Finland) TPS	Düsseldorf, Germany
1991	(Sweden) Djurgårdens IF	7–2	(Germany) Düsseldorfer EG	(Russia) Dynamo Moscow	Düsseldorf, Germany
1992	(Sweden) Malmö IF	3–3 (1-0 SO)	(Russia) Dynamo Moscow	(Finland) Jokerit	Düsseldorf, Germany
1993	(Finland) TPS	4–3	(Russia) Dynamo Moscow	(Sweden) Malmö IF	Düsseldorf, Germany
1994	(Finland) Jokerit	4–2	(Russia) Lada Togliatti	(Finland) TPS	Helsinki, Turku, Finland
1995	(Finland) Jokerit	3–3 (3-2 SO)	(Germany) Kölner Haie	(Sweden) HV71	Cologne, Germany
1996	(Russia) Lada Togliatti	4–3 (OT)	(Sweden) Modo	(Germany) Düsseldorfer EG	Düsseldorf, Germany

=== By club ===
Club	Winners	Runners-up	Third
(Soviet Union) CSKA Moscow	20	0	1
(Czechoslovakia) ZKL Brno	3	0	1
(Sweden) Djurgårdens IF	2	0	1
(Finland) Jokerit	2	0	1
(Czechoslovakia) Poldi Kladno	1	3	1
(Finland) TPS	1	1	3
(Russia) HC Lada Togliatti	1	1	0
(Sweden) Malmö IF	1	0	1
(Soviet Union) Krylya Sovetov Moscow	1	0	0
(Czechoslovakia) Dukla Jihlava	0	5	4
(Russia) Dynamo Moscow	0	3	1
(Sweden) Brynäs	0	2	2
(Germany) Kölner Haie	0	2	1
(Soviet Union) Spartak Moscow	0	2	0
(Czechoslovakia) Tesla Pardubice	0	2	0
(Czechoslovakia) TJ VSŽ Košice	0	2	0
(Germany) Düsseldorfer EG	0	1	3
(Austria) EC KAC	0	1	3
(Finland) Tappara	0	1	3
(Finland) HIFK	0	1	1
(West Germany) EV Füssen	0	1	0
(Finland) Ilves	0	1	0
(Sweden) Modo	0	1	0
(Sweden) Södertälje SK	0	1	0
(Czechoslovakia) TJ Vítkovice	0	1	0
(East Germany) SC Dynamo Berlin	0	0	4
(East Germany) SG Dynamo Weißwasser	0	0	2
(Finland) Ässät	0	0	1
(Sweden) Färjestad BK	0	0	1
(Sweden) HV71	0	0	1
(Sweden) Leksands IF	0	0	1
(West Germany) SB Rosenheim	0	0	1
(West Germany) SC Riessersee	0	0	1
(Italy) SG Cortina	0	0	1
(Czechoslovakia) Slovan Bratislava	0	0	1
(Netherlands) Tilburg Trappers	0	0	1
(Norway) Vålerenga	0	0	1

=== By nation ===
Nation	Winners	Runners-up	Third
Soviet Union Russia	22	6	2
Czechoslovakia	4	13	7
Finland	3	4	9
Sweden	3	4	7
West Germany East Germany Germany	0	4	12
Austria	0	1	3
Italy	0	0	1
Netherlands	0	0	1
Norway	0	0	1

== See also ==
- European Hockey League
- IIHF Continental Cup
- IIHF European Champions Cup
- Spengler Cup
- Stanley Cup
- Memorial Cup
- Beijing International Ice Hockey League
- Asia League Ice Hockey
- Supreme Hockey League
- Kontinental Hockey League
