= 1965–66 IIHF European Cup =

European ice hockey tournament

The 1965–66 European Cup was the first edition of the European Cup, IIHF's premier European club ice hockey tournament. The season started on October 23, 1965, and finished on March 18, 1966, at Brno, Czechoslovakia.

The tournament was won by ZKL Brno, who beat EV Füssen in the final

== First round ==
Team #1	Score	Team #2
SG Cortina (Italy)	7-2, 3-1, 3-3, 4-3	(France) HC Chamonix
Újpesti Dózsa (Hungary)	8-3, 8-0, 6-4, 8-4	(Bulgaria) HK CSKA Sofia
EC KAC (Austria)	10-3, 7-4, 3-2, 4-3	(Switzerland) SC Bern
GKS Katowice (Poland)	10-2, 4-1, 2-2, 2-4	(Socialist Federal Republic of Yugoslavia) HK Jesenice
Vålerenga (Norway)	10-1, 19-1, 9-1, 6-0	(Denmark) KSF København
Karhut Pori (Finland)	w/o	(Sweden) Västra Frölunda

(Czechoslovakia) ZKL Brno, (West Germany) EV Füssen: bye

== Quarterfinals ==
Team #1	Score	Team #2
GKS Katowice (Poland)	3-3, 3-3, 0-8, 3-:12	(Czechoslovakia) ZKL Brno
EV Füssen (West Germany)	5-0, 9-1, 1-2, 1-1	(Italy) SG Cortina
Újpesti Dózsa (Hungary)	2-6, 3-4, 1-5, 0-9	(Austria) EC KAC
Vålerenga (Norway)	8-2, 2-1, 1-3, 4-4	(Finland) Karhut Pori

== Semifinals ==
Team #1	Score	Team #2
EC KAC (Austria)	3-4, 2-7, 3-4, 3-11	(Czechoslovakia) ZKL Brno
Vålerenga (Norway)	3-3, 3-6, 6-5, 1-7	(West Germany) EV Füssen

== Finals ==
Team #1	Score	Team #2
EV Füssen (West Germany)	4-6, 5-7, 2-6, 1-6	(Czechoslovakia) ZKL Brno

== Top Goalscorer ==
- Karel Skopal (ZKL Brno), 11
