= 1993–94 Latvian Hockey League season =

1993–94 Latvian Hockey League
- League: Latvian Hockey Higher League
- Sport: Ice hockey
- Number of teams: 8

Regular season
- Champions: Pārdaugava Riga
- Runners-up: Hokeja Centrs Riga

Latvian Hockey League seasons
- ← 1992–93 1994–95 →

The 1993–94 Latvian Hockey League season was the third season of the Latvian Hockey League, the top level of ice hockey in Latvia. Seven teams participated in the league, and Pardaugava Riga won the championship.

== Regular season ==
	Club	GP	W	T	L	GF:GA	Pts
1.	Hokeja Centrs Riga	24	20	1	3	195:62	41
2.	HK Nik’s Brih Riga	24	20	0	4	226:74	40
3.	Essamika Ogre	24	15	1	8	188:109	31
4.	Latvijas Zelts Riga	24	13	0	11	132:141	26
5.	Pārdaugava Riga II	24	8	0	16	123:179	16
6.	RTU-Hanza Riga	24	4	0	20	85:210	8
7.	Nik's Juniors Riga	24	3	0	21	81:255	6

== Final round ==
	Club	GP	W	T	L	GF:GA	Pts
1.	Pārdaugava Riga	3	3	0	0	17:5	6
2.	Hokeja Centrs Riga	3	1	1	1	13:10	3
3.	Essamika Ogre	3	0	2	1	10:14	2
4.	HK Nik’s Brih Riga	3	0	1	2	8:19	1
