= 1994–95 Latvian Hockey League season =

1994–95 Latvian Hockey League
- League: Latvian Hockey Higher League
- Sport: Ice hockey
- Number of teams: 5

Regular season
- Champions: HK Nik’s Brih Riga
- Runners-up: Essamika Ogre

Latvian Hockey League seasons
- ← 1993–94 1995–96 →

The 1994–95 Latvian Hockey League season was the fourth season of the Latvian Hockey League, the top level of ice hockey in Latvia. Five teams participated in the league, and HK Nik's Brih Riga won the championship.

== Standings ==
	Club	GP	W	T	L	GF:GA	Pts
1.	HK Nik’s Brih Riga	24	22	0	2	203:93	44
2.	Essamika Ogre	24	19	0	5	211:89	38
3.	Pārdaugava Riga II	24	11	1	12	121:135	23
4.	Juniors Riga	24	4	1	19	84:163	9
5.	Latvijas Zelts Riga	24	3	0	21	92:231	6
