= HK Sāga Ķekava Riga =

Latvian ice hockey club

- City: Riga, Latvia
- League: Latvian Hockey League
- Founded: 1991

HK Sāga Ķekava Riga was an ice hockey team in Riga, Latvia. They played in the Latvian Hockey League from 1991-1996.

== History ==
The club was founded in 1991, and promptly won the first Latvian Hockey League title. They were not able to repeat this success, and their best finish was fifth place in the following season. After a 9th-place finish in the 1995-96 season, the club folded.

== Season-by-season record ==
Season	GP	W	L	T	OTL	GF	GA	P	Results
1991-92	-	-	-	-	-	-	-	-	1st
1992-93	6	4	1	1	-	95	23	9	2nd in Group A (qualified for final round)
1992-93	21	9	11	1	-	158	169	19	5th in final round
1993-94	20	13	5	2	-	150	121	28	3rd in Group B
1994-95	14	-	-	-	-	70	69	10	7th in Division II
1995-96	30	19	7	2	-	212	156	40	3rd in Division II
