= Aleš Kranjc =

Slovenian ice hockey player

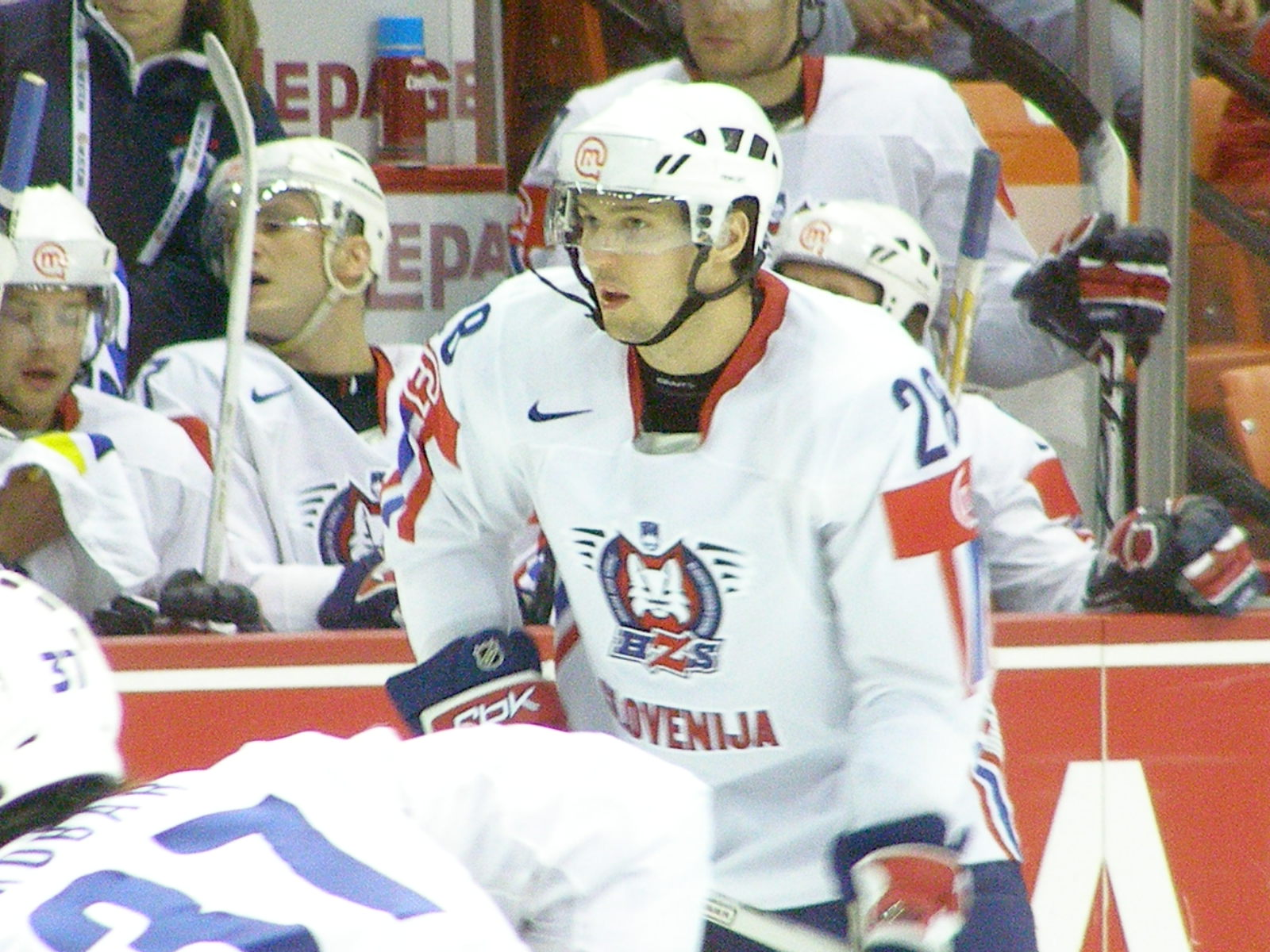
- Born: July 29, 1981 (age 43); Jesenice, Slovenia
- Height: 6 ft 0 in (183 cm)
- Weight: 201 lb (91 kg; 14 st 5 lb)
- Position: Defence
- Shot: Left
- {{{league}}} team Former teams: EV Lindau Islanders; HK Jesenice; Vienna Capitals; Alba Volán Székesfehérvár; HC České Budějovice; Kölner Haie; Södertälje SK; HDD Jesenice; Rote Teufel Bad Nauheim
- National team: Slovenia
- NHL draft: Undrafted
- Playing career: 2000–2021

Aleš Kranjc (born July 29, 1981) is a Slovenian ice hockey player who plays for EV Lindau Islanders in the southern division of the 3rd tier German Oberliga. He participated at several IIHF World Championships as a member of the Slovenia men's national ice hockey team.

== Career statistics ==
=== Regular season and playoffs ===
			Regular season					Playoffs
Season	Team	League	GP	G	A	Pts	PIM	GP	G	A	Pts	PIM
1997–98	HK Jesenice	SVN	—	—	—	—	—	—	—	—	—	—
1998–99	HK Jesenice	SVN	—	—	—	—	—	—	—	—	—	—
1999–2000	HK Jesenice	IEHL	30	3	1	4	24	—	—	—	—	—
1999–2000	HK Jesenice	SVN	—	—	—	—	—	—	—	—	—	—
2000–01	HK Jesenice	IEHL	20	9	8	17	12	—	—	—	—	—
2000–01	HK Jesenice	SVN	25	5	15	20	6	—	—	—	—	—
2001–02	HK Jesenice	IEHL	14	1	6	7	8	—	—	—	—	—
2001–02	HK Jesenice	SVN	14	2	10	12	18	—	—	—	—	—
2002–03	HK Jesenice	IEHL	16	4	8	12	22	—	—	—	—	—
2002–03	HK Jesenice	SVN	26	10	19	29	24	5	1	0	1	0
2003–04	HK Jesenice	IEHL	16	5	5	10	8	5	2	0	2	4
2003–04	HK Jesenice	SVN	14	7	6	13	16	4	2	1	3	2
2004–05	HK Jesenice	IEHL	25	9	12	21	68	—	—	—	—	—
2004–05	HK Jesenice	SVN	19	15	11	26	24	—	—	—	—	—
2005–06	HK Jesenice	IEHL	22	10	10	20	53	6	6	1	7	20
2005–06	HK Jesenice	SVN	24	17	15	32	86	—	—	—	—	—
2006–07	HK Jesenice	AUT	40	11	7	18	40	—	—	—	—	—
2006–07	HD Mladi Jesenice	SVN	1	0	1	1	0	—	—	—	—	—
2007–08	HK Jesenice	AUT	45	5	17	22	46	5	0	1	1	6
2007–08	HK Jesenice	SVN	—	—	—	—	—	6	1	4	5	0
2008–09	HK Jesenice	AUT	49	9	27	36	40	—	—	—	—	—
2009–10	Vienna Capitals	AUT	51	10	13	23	28	12	1	3	4	2
2010–11	Fehérvár AV19	EBEL	40	3	14	17	32	—	—	—	—	—
2010–11	Fehérvár AV19	EBEL	—	—	—	—	—	2	0	2	2	6
2011–12	HC Mountfield	ELH	51	2	10	12	24	5	0	2	2	2
2012–13	Kölner Haie	DEL	48	5	20	25	32	12	2	5	7	12
2013–14	Kölner Haie	DEL	36	3	5	8	16	14	1	0	1	2
2014–15	HC Kuban	VHL	5	1	0	1	6	—	—	—	—	—
2014–15	Södertälje SK	Allsv	11	1	0	1	4	—	—	—	—	—
2015–16	Piráti Chomutov	ELH	8	0	0	0	2	—	—	—	—	—
2015–16	Graz99ers	AUT	34	0	12	12	26	—	—	—	—	—
2016–17	HDD Jesenice	AlpsHL	10	2	6	8	10	—	—	—	—	—
2016–17	EC Bad Nauheim	GER.2	28	7	15	22	14	—	—	—	—	—
2017–18	Eispiraten Crimmitschau	DEL2	46	1	31	32	14	6	1	2	3	0
2018–19	HK Olimpija	AlpsHL	40	9	23	32	14	16	0	10	10	12
2018–19	HK Olimpija	SVN	3	0	4	4	0	2	1	1	2	0
2019–20	HK Olimpija	AlpsHL	9	0	1	1	6	—	—	—	—	—
2019–20	HK Olimpija	SVN	4	0	2	2	2	—	—	—	—	—
2019–20	EV Lindau	GER2	35	3	8	11	14	—	—	—	—	—
SVN totals			130	56	83	139	176	17	5	6	11	2
IEHL totals			143	41	50	91	195	11	8	1	9	24
AUT totals			259	38	90	128	212	17	1	4	5	8

=== International ===
Year	Team	Event	GP	G	A	Pts	PIM
1997	Slovenia	EJC C	5	0	2	2	2
1998	Slovenia	EJC C	4	1	3	4	31
1999	Slovenia	WJC C	4	0	2	2	6
1999	Slovenia	EJC D1	4	1	3	4	10
2000	Slovenia	WJC C	4	4	1	5	4
2000	Slovenia	WC B	7	1	1	2	4
2001	Slovenia	WJC D2	4	1	3	4	10
2003	Slovenia	WC	6	0	1	1	2
2004	Slovenia	WC D1	5	2	0	2	16
2005	Slovenia	OGQ	3	0	0	0	0
2006	Slovenia	WC	6	4	2	6	10
2008	Slovenia	WC	5	0	1	1	0
2009	Slovenia	OGQ	3	1	0	1	2
2010	Slovenia	WC D1	5	2	1	3	4
2011	Slovenia	WC	6	1	0	1	8
2012	Slovenia	WC D1A	5	2	2	4	4
2013	Slovenia	OGQ	3	0	2	2	16
2013	Slovenia	WC	7	0	0	0	10
2014	Slovenia	OG	5	0	0	0	2
2015	Slovenia	WC	7	0	3	3	0
2016	Slovenia	WC D1A	5	0	0	0	4
2016	Slovenia	OGQ	3	1	0	1	4
2017	Slovenia	WC	7	0	2	2	4
2018	Slovenia	OG	3	0	0	0	0
2018	Slovenia	WC D1A	5	0	0	0	6
Junior totals			25	7	14	21	63
Senior totals			96	14	15	29	96
