= Aleš Mušič =

Slovenian ice hockey player

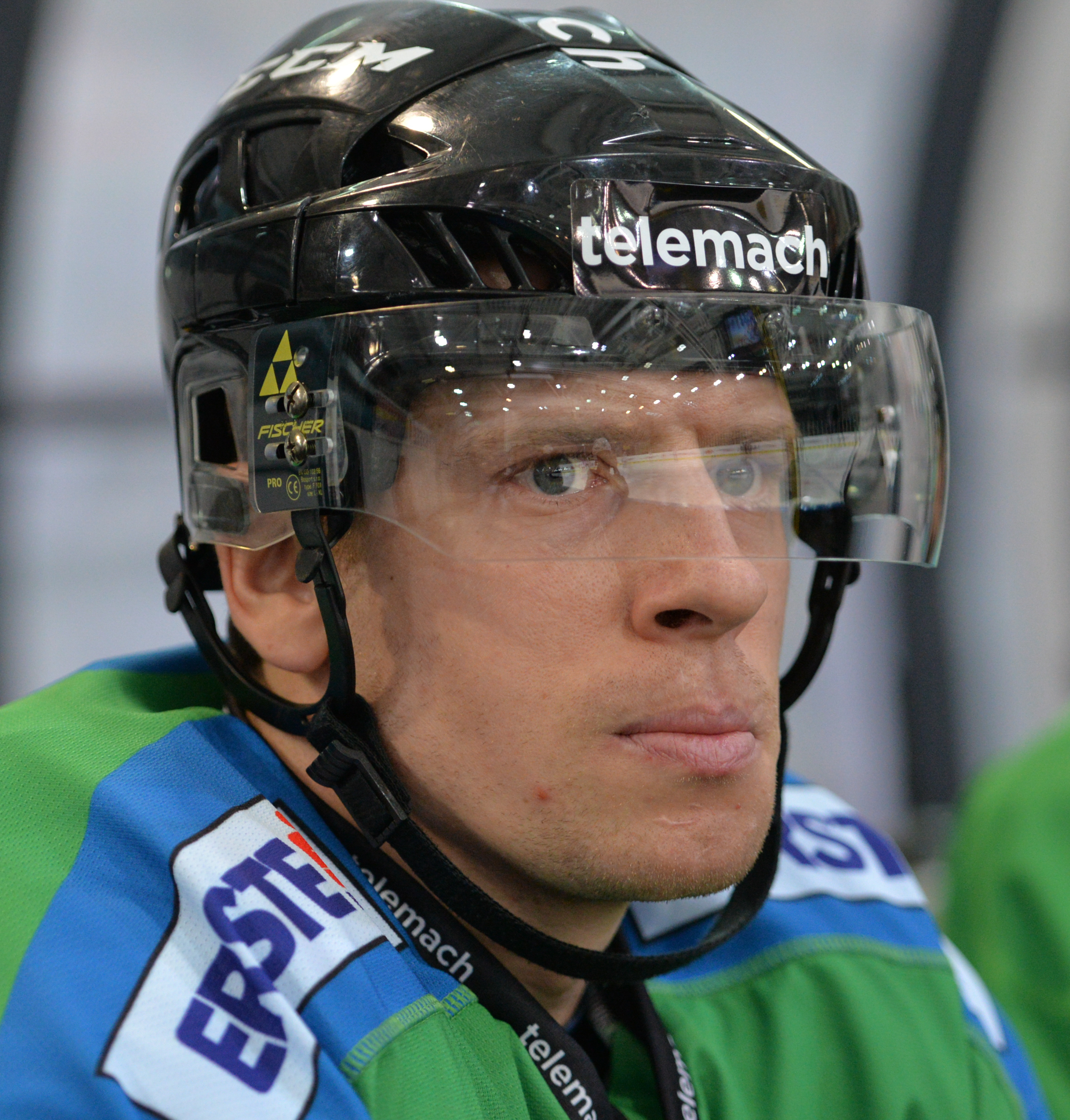
- Born: June 28, 1982 (age 42); Ljubljana, Yugoslavia
- Height: 5 ft 9 in (175 cm)
- Weight: 181 lb (82 kg; 12 st 13 lb)
- Position: Left wing
- Shoots: Left
- EBEL team Former teams: Fehérvár AV19; HDD Olimpija Ljubljana
- National team: Slovenia
- Playing career: 2000–present

Aleš Mušič (born June 28, 1982) is a Slovenian professional ice hockey winger for Fehérvár AV19.

Mušič competed in several IIHF World Championships as a member of the Slovenia men's national ice hockey team.

== Career statistics ==
=== Regular season and playoffs ===
			Regular season					Playoffs
Season	Team	League	GP	G	A	Pts	PIM	GP	G	A	Pts	PIM
2000–01	HDD Olimpija Ljubljana	IEHL
2000–01	HDD Olimpija Ljubljana	SVN	20	5	8	13	8	—	—	—	—	—
2000–01	HK Olimpija	SVN	3	1	2	3	4	—	—	—	—	—
2001–02	HDD Olimpija Ljubljana	IEHL	12	2	4	6	8	—	—	—	—	—
2001–02	HK Olimpija	SVN	10	6	8	14	16	—	—	—	—	—
2002–03	HDD Olimpija Ljubljana	IEHL	16	3	3	6	12	—	—	—	—	—
2002–03	HDD Olimpija Ljubljana	SVN	25	10	19	29	20	5	0	1	1	0
2003–04	HDD Olimpija Ljubljana	IEHL	13	1	0	1	4	4	1	0	1	4
2003–04	HDD Olimpija Ljubljana	SVN	13	4	2	6	0	4	2	1	3	2
2004–05	HDD Olimpija Ljubljana	IEHL	22	3	6	9	12	—	—	—	—	—
2004–05	HDD Olimpija Ljubljana	SVN	14	10	7	17	27	—	—	—	—	—
2005–06	HDD Olimpija Ljubljana	IEHL	21	8	6	14	16	5	2	0	2	2
2005–06	HDD Olimpija Ljubljana	SVN	24	13	23	36	24	—	—	—	—	—
2006–07	HDD Olimpija Ljubljana	IEHL	20	7	5	12	50	—	—	—	—	—
2006–07	HDD Olimpija Ljubljana	SVN	25	14	18	32	38	5	2	2	4	10
2007–08	HDD Olimpija Ljubljana	AUT	41	4	11	15	24	14	0	0	0	10
2007–08	HDD Olimpija Ljubljana	SVN	—	—	—	—	—	7	2	3	5	8
2008–09	HDD Olimpija Ljubljana	AUT	49	9	8	17	36	—	—	—	—	—
2008–09	HK Olimpija	SVN	1	0	0	0	0	—	—	—	—	—
2008–09	HDD Olimpija Ljubljana	SVN	—	—	—	—	—	7	0	4	4	6
2009–10	HDD Olimpija Ljubljana	AUT	47	6	17	23	34	—	—	—	—	—
2009–10	HDD Olimpija Ljubljana	SVN	4	4	5	9	0	6	1	1	2	35
2010–11	HDD Olimpija Ljubljana	AUT	38	4	9	13	43	4	1	0	1	6
2010–11	HDD Olimpija Ljubljana	SVN	4	5	3	8	2	4	0	0	0	2
2011–12	HDD Olimpija Ljubljana	AUT	38	18	23	41	28	11	3	4	7	2
2011–12	HDD Olimpija Ljubljana	SVN	—	—	—	—	—	6	5	4	9	6
2012–13	HDD Olimpija Ljubljana	AUT	52	7	12	19	26	—	—	—	—	—
2012–13	HDD Olimpija Ljubljana	SVN	—	—	—	—	—	4	7	4	11	14
2013–14	HDD Olimpija Ljubljana	AUT	49	7	23	30	37	—	—	—	—	—
2013–14	HDD Olimpija Ljubljana	SVN	—	—	—	—	—	4	2	3	5	0
2014–15	HDD Olimpija Ljubljana	AUT	50	12	12	24	24	—	—	—	—	—
2014–15	HDD Olimpija Ljubljana	SVN	—	—	—	—	—	6	2	3	5	6
2015–16	HDD Olimpija Ljubljana	AUT	42	5	13	18	32	—	—	—	—	—
2015–16	HDD Olimpija Ljubljana	SVN	—	—	—	—	—	7	2	2	4	4
2016–17	HDD Olimpija Ljubljana	AUT	38	10	15	25	24	—	—	—	—	—
2016–17	HDD Olimpija Ljubljana	SVN	—	—	—	—	—	7	3	6	9	4
2017–18	Fehérvár AV19	AUT	43	5	7	12	24	—	—	—	—	—
2018–19	HK Olimpija	AlpsHL	40	20	26	46	53	16	8	9	17	10
2018–19	HK Olimpija	SVN	5	2	6	8	0	4	0	4	4	6
2019–20	HK Olimpija	AlpsHL	38	5	30	35	26	—	—	—	—	—
2019–20	HK Olimpija	SVN	2	0	4	4	0	2	0	2	2	0
2020–21	HK Olimpija	AlpsHL	33	12	20	32	8	11	4	9	13	25
2020–21	HK Olimpija	SVN	5	3	3	6	4	7	2	1	3	4
2021–22	HK Olimpija	ICEHL	24	5	1	6	6	7	0	3	3	4
2021–22	HK Olimpija	IHL	2	1	0	1	0	—	—	—	—	—
2021–22	HK Olimpija	SVN	2	1	0	1	0	2	0	2	2	2
IEHL totals			104	24	24	48	102	9	3	0	3	6
SVN totals			157	78	108	186	143	87	30	43	73	109
AUT/ICEHL totals			511	92	151	243	338	36	4	7	11	22

=== International ===
Year	Team	Event	GP	G	A	Pts	PIM
1999	Slovenia	EJC D1	4	3	0	3	6
2000	Slovenia	EJC D1	4	5	5	10	16
2001	Slovenia	WJC D2	4	1	1	2	6
2002	Slovenia	WJC D1	5	3	0	3	4
2008	Slovenia	WC	5	0	0	0	0
2009	Slovenia	OGQ	3	2	0	2	2
2009	Slovenia	WC D1	5	1	3	4	2
2010	Slovenia	WC D1	5	0	1	1	2
2012	Slovenia	WC D1A	5	0	2	2	8
2013	Slovenia	OGQ	3	0	0	0	0
2013	Slovenia	WC	6	0	0	0	2
2014	Slovenia	OG	5	0	0	0	0
2014	Slovenia	WC D1A	5	2	1	3	8
2015	Slovenia	WC	7	1	0	1	4
2016	Slovenia	WC D1A	5	2	2	4	2
2016	Slovenia	OGQ	3	1	0	1	0
2017	Slovenia	WC	7	0	1	1	0
2018	Slovenia	OG	4	0	0	0	0
2018	Slovenia	WC D1A	5	0	2	2	4
Junior totals			17	12	6	18	32
Senior totals			73	9	12	21	34
