= Andrej Tavželj =

Slovenian ice hockey player

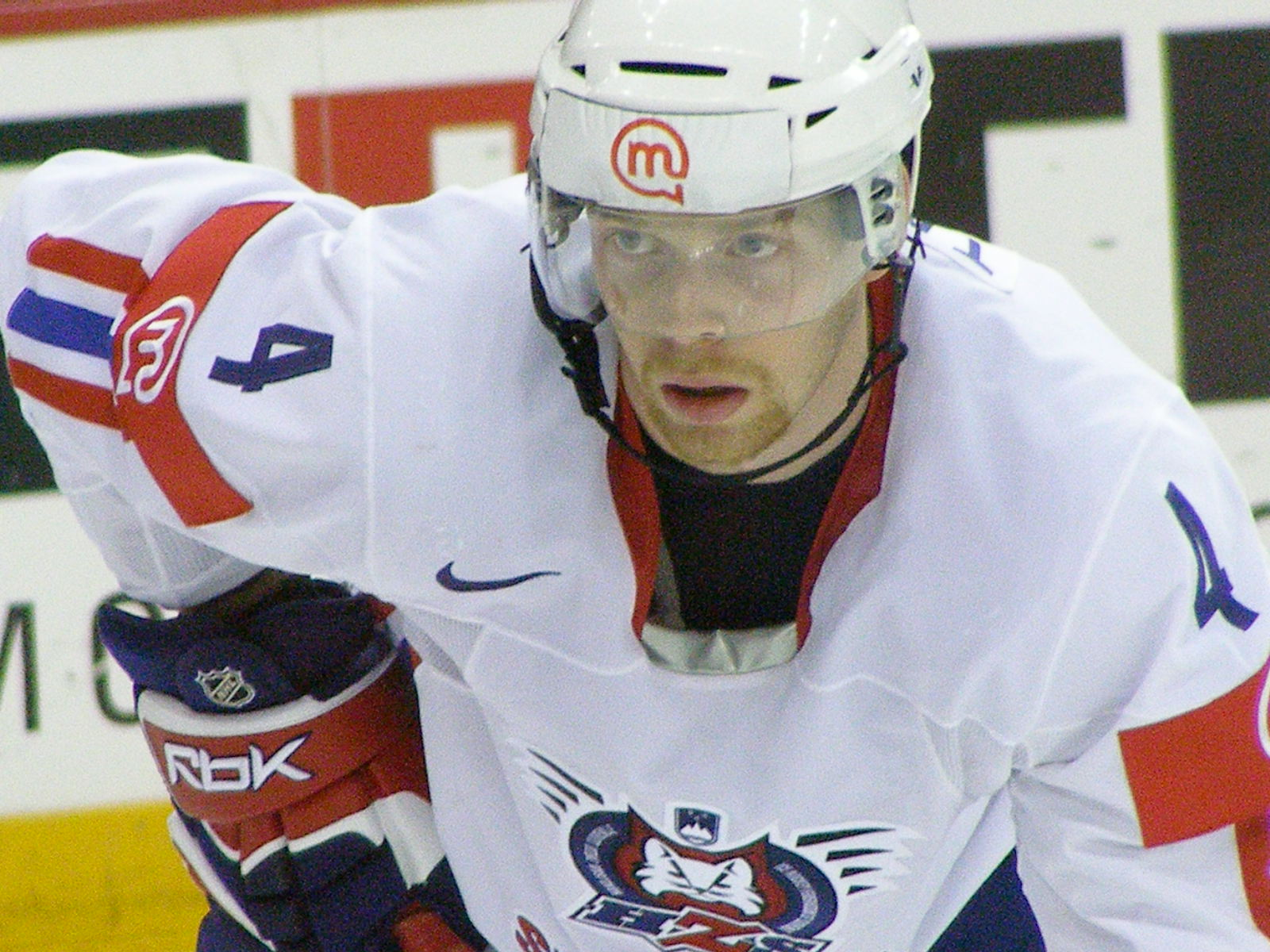
- Born: March 14, 1984 (age 41) Kovor, Yugoslavia
- Height: 6 ft 2 in (188 cm)
- Weight: 209 lb (95 kg; 14 st 13 lb)
- Position: Defence
- Shoots: Left
- AlpsHL team Former teams: HDD Jesenice; HK Triglav Kranj; HK Slavija; HDD Olimpija Ljubljana; SG Cortina; SG Pontebba; HK Jesenice; HK Poprad; Dragons de Rouen; Toros Neftekamsk; Ducs d'Angers
- National team: Slovenia
- NHL draft: Undrafted
- Playing career: 2000–present

Andrej Tavželj (born March 14, 1984) is a Slovenian professional ice hockey player. He is currently under contract to Slovenian team HDD Jesenice of the Alps Hockey League. He participated at the 2011 IIHF World Championship as a member of the Slovenia men's national ice hockey team.

== Career statistics ==
=== Regular season and playoffs ===
			Regular season					Playoffs
Season	Team	League	GP	G	A	Pts	PIM	GP	G	A	Pts	PIM
2000–01	HK Triglav Kranj	SVN	1	0	0	0	2	—	—	—	—	—
2001–02	HK Triglav Kranj	SVN	10	0	1	1	41	—	—	—	—	—
2002–03	HK Triglav Kranj	SVN U20	16	2	3	5	18	5	0	2	2	10
2002–03	HK Triglav Kranj	SVN	23	1	3	4	10	—	—	—	—	—
2003–04	HK Triglav Kranj	SVN U20	23	4	12	16	36	4	0	2	2	0
2003–04	HK Triglav Kranj	SVN	17	2	3	5	24	—	—	—	—	—
2004–05	HK Slavija	IEHL	6	0	1	1	2	—	—	—	—	—
2004–05	HK Triglav Kranj	SVN	24	5	10	15	48	—	—	—	—	—
2005–06	HDD Olimpija Ljubljana	IEHL	24	1	9	10	30	5	0	2	2	6
2005–06	HDD Olimpija Ljubljana	SVN	23	5	9	14	51	—	—	—	—	—
2006–07	HDD Olimpija Ljubljana	IEHL	21	3	8	11	12	5	0	2	2	2
2006–07	HDD Olimpija Ljubljana	SVN	26	5	12	17	73	4	0	1	1	31
2007–08	HDD Olimpija Ljubljana	AUT	41	2	0	2	79	12	0	0	0	43
2007–08	HDD Olimpija Ljubljana	SVN	—	—	—	—	—	6	0	0	0	27
2008–09	HDD Olimpija Ljubljana	AUT	54	2	7	9	134	—	—	—	—	—
2008–09	HDD Olimpija Ljubljana	SVN	—	—	—	—	—	7	0	0	0	10
2009–10	HDD Olimpija Ljubljana	AUT	40	0	5	5	50	—	—	—	—	—
2009–10	SG Cortina	ITA	11	1	2	3	0	—	—	—	—	—
2010–11	SG Pontebba	ITA	38	0	8	8	26	3	1	0	1	4
2011–12	HK Acroni Jesenice	AUT	37	5	5	10	42	—	—	—	—	—
2011–12	HK AutoFinance Poprad	SVK	14	1	3	4	6	6	0	1	1	0
2012–13	Dragons de Rouen	FRA	25	3	6	9	20	15	0	3	3	18
2013–14	Dragons de Rouen	FRA	23	2	3	5	10	9	0	0	0	6
2014–15	Toros Neftekamsk	VHL	44	1	4	5	32	20	1	5	6	6
2015–16	HDD Olimpija Ljubljana	AUT	47	2	9	11	55	—	—	—	—	—
2015–16	HDD Olimpija Ljubljana	SVN	—	—	—	—	—	7	1	2	3	2
2016–17	Ducs d'Angers	FRA	44	4	10	14	28	6	0	2	2	4
2017–18	HDD Jesenice	AlpsHL	39	7	22	29	12	8	0	8	8	0
2017–18	HDD Jesenice	SVN	4	0	4	4	0	6	2	2	4	4
2018–19	HDD Jesenice	AlpsHL	32	5	23	28	10	11	1	3	4	8
2018–19	HDD Jesenice	SVN	4	2	4	6	0	4	2	2	4	4
2019–20	HDD Jesenice	AlpsHL	44	7	17	24	8	—	—	—	—	—
2019–20	HDD Jesenice	SVN	9	4	3	7	2	1	0	0	0	0
2020–21	HDD Jesenice	AlpsHL	15	1	6	7	8	8	0	2	2	0
2020–21	HDD Jesenice	SVN	9	1	5	6	6	4	1	1	2	0
2021–22	EC KAC II	AlpsHL	21	0	6	6	10	—	—	—	—	—
2021–22	EC KAC	ICEHL	28	0	1	1	8	9	0	1	1	0
SVN totals			150	25	54	79	257	39	6	8	14	78
AUT/ICEHL totals			247	11	27	38	368	21	0	1	1	43
AlpsHL totals			151	20	74	94	48	27	1	13	14	8

=== International ===
Year	Team	Event	GP	G	A	Pts	PIM
2002	Slovenia	WJC18 D1	5	0	0	0	10
2004	Slovenia	WJC D1	5	0	0	0	16
2008	Slovenia	WC	5	0	0	0	0
2009	Slovenia	OGQ	3	0	1	1	0
2009	Slovenia	WC D1	5	0	0	0	4
2010	Slovenia	WC D1	5	0	1	1	2
2011	Slovenia	WC	6	0	1	1	2
2012	Slovenia	WC D1A	5	0	1	1	6
2013	Slovenia	OGQ	3	0	1	1	0
2013	Slovenia	WC	7	0	0	0	4
2014	Slovenia	OG	5	0	0	0	2
2014	Slovenia	WC D1A	5	0	0	0	2
2015	Slovenia	WC	6	0	0	0	2
2017	Slovenia	WC	4	0	1	1	0
Junior totals			10	0	0	0	26
Senior totals			59	0	6	6	24
