= Žiga Pavlin =

Slovenian ice hockey player (born 1985)

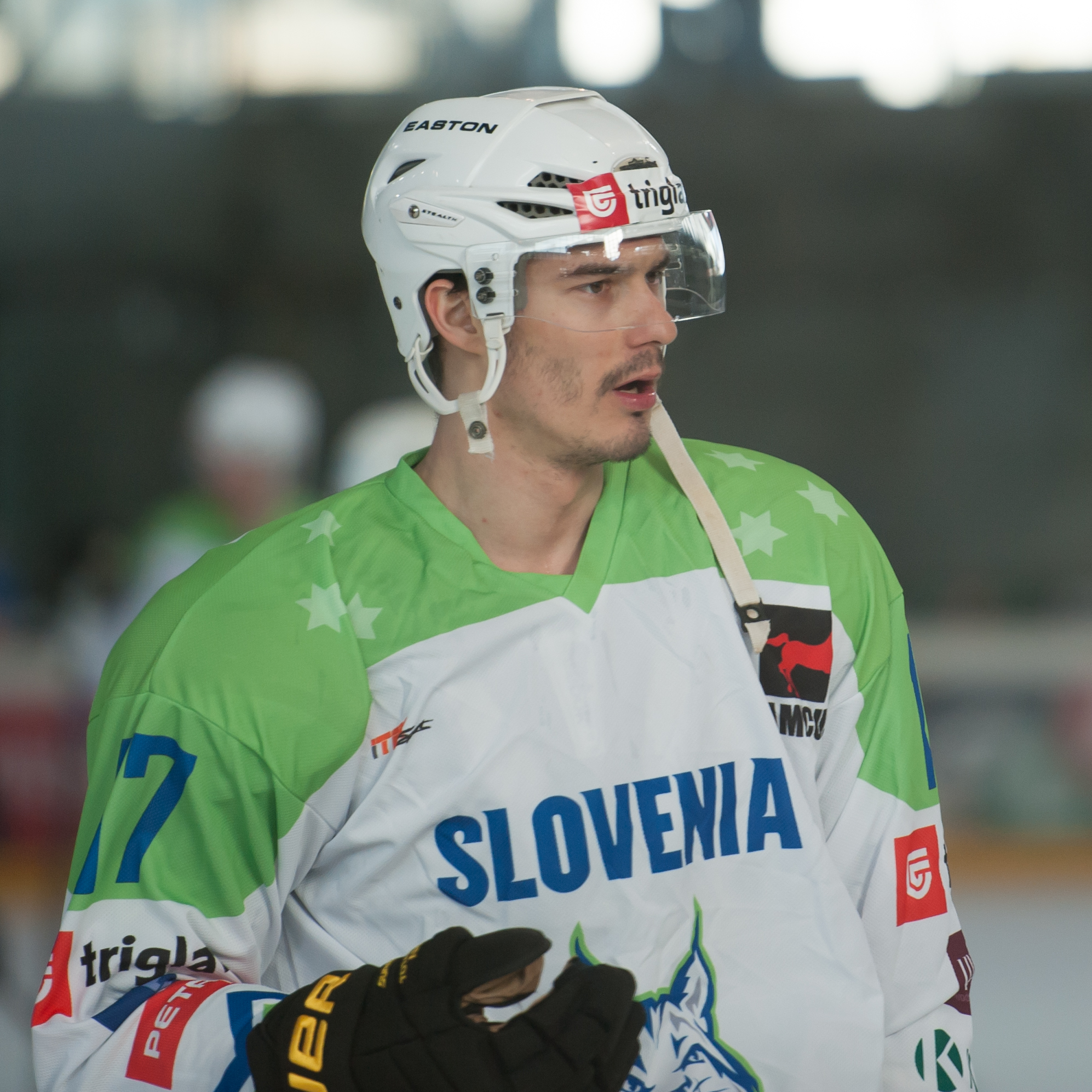
- Born: 30 April 1985 (age 41) Kranj, Yugoslavia
- Height: 6 ft 4 in (193 cm)
- Weight: 214 lb (97 kg; 15 st 4 lb)
- Position: Defence
- Shot: Right
- ICEHL team Former teams: HK Olimpija; HK Kranjska Gora; HKMK Bled; HK Triglav Kranj; HK Slavija; HDD Olimpija Ljubljana; Ritten Sport; IF Troja/Ljungby; Rögle BK; Saryarka Karagandy; AIK IF; HC Slavia Praha; Motor České Budějovice; HC Košice; HK Dukla Michalovce; HC '05 Banská Bystrica
- National team: Slovenia
- NHL draft: Undrafted
- Playing career: 2005–2026

Žiga Pavlin (born 30 April 1985) is a Slovenian ice hockey player. He plays for HK Olimpija.

He participated at several IIHF World Championships as a member of the Slovenia men's national ice hockey team. In the 2015/2016 season, he was playing for team, HC Slavia Praha in the 1st Czech Republic Hockey League, the second highest league in the country.

== Career statistics ==
=== Regular season and playoffs ===
			Regular season					Playoffs
Season	Team	League	GP	G	A	Pts	PIM	GP	G	A	Pts	PIM
2000–01	HK Kranjska Gora	SVN	1	0	0	0	0	—	—	—	—	—
2001–02	HKMK Bled	SVN	10	0	0	0	32	—	—	—	—	—
2002–03	HK Triglav Kranj	SVN U20	16	1	5	6	30	—	—	—	—	—
2002–03	HK Triglav Kranj	SVN	22	1	2	3	12	—	—	—	—	—
2003–04	HK Triglav Kranj	SVN U20	18	5	12	17	30	4	1	4	5	16
2003–04	HK Triglav Kranj	SVN	17	2	3	5	24	—	—	—	—	—
2004–05	HK Triglav Kranj	SVN U20	13	3	16	19	30	4	0	0	0	14
2004–05	HK Triglav Kranj	SVN	23	3	7	10	42	—	—	—	—	—
2005–06	HK Triglav Kranj	SVN	24	7	10	17	60	—	—	—	—	—
2005–06	HK Slavija	SVN	17	4	2	6	26	—	—	—	—	—
2006–07	HK Slavija	IEHL	20	1	5	6	42	—	—	—	—	—
2006–07	HK Slavija	SVN	24	9	13	22	52	5	2	0	2	14
2007–08	HDD Olimpija Ljubljana	AUT	42	3	3	6	20	14	0	1	1	14
2007–08	HDD Olimpija Ljubljana	SVN	—	—	—	—	—	9	0	0	0	8
2008–09	HDD Olimpija Ljubljana	AUT	52	6	12	18	36	—	—	—	—	—
2008–09	HDD Olimpija Ljubljana	SVN	—	—	—	—	—	7	1	3	4	4
2009–10	Ritten Sport	ITA	39	3	17	20	46	14	3	5	8	43
2010–11	HDD Olimpija Ljubljana	AUT	53	9	21	30	91	4	0	1	1	8
2010–11	HDD Olimpija Ljubljana	SVN	4	0	4	4	16	4	0	1	1	14
2011–12	IF Troja/Ljungby	Allsv	49	10	16	26	53	—	—	—	—	—
2012–13	IF Troja/Ljungby	Allsv	40	3	8	11	18	—	—	—	—	—
2012–13	Rögle BK	SEL	10	0	3	3	2	—	—	—	—	—
2013–14	IF Troja/Ljungby	Allsv	47	4	15	19	30	10	1	6	7	6
2014–15	Saryarka Karagandy	VHL	22	1	6	7	19	—	—	—	—	—
2014–15	AIK	Allsv	18	1	0	1	14	10	0	2	2	4
2015–16	HC Slavia Praha	CZE.2	50	7	21	28	54	8	0	4	4	18
2016–17	ČEZ Motor České Budějovice	CZE.2	51	8	27	35	34	9	1	5	6	12
2017–18	ČEZ Motor České Budějovice	CZE.2	39	2	8	10	36	8	0	3	3	6
2018–19	ČEZ Motor České Budějovice	CZE.2	52	7	21	28	62	11	0	2	2	22
2019–20	ČEZ Motor České Budějovice	CZE.2	2	0	0	0	0	—	—	—	—	—
2019–20	HC Košice	SVK	19	2	7	9	6	—	—	—	—	—
2020–21	HC Košice	SVK	47	5	17	22	14	4	0	1	1	6
2021–22	HK Dukla Ingema Michalovce	SVK	44	4	19	23	40	6	0	0	0	4
SVN totals			142	26	41	67	264	25	3	4	7	40
AUT totals			147	18	36	54	147	18	0	2	2	22
CZE.2 totals			194	24	77	101	186	36	1	14	15	58

=== International ===
Year	Team	Event	GP	G	A	Pts	PIM
2003	Slovenia	WJC18 D1	5	1	2	3	8
2004	Slovenia	WJC D1	5	1	1	2	16
2005	Slovenia	WJC D1	5	0	4	4	4
2009	Slovenia	OGQ	3	0	0	0	2
2009	Slovenia	WC D1	5	0	1	1	6
2010	Slovenia	WC D1	5	1	1	2	2
2011	Slovenia	WC	3	0	0	0	0
2012	Slovenia	WC D1A	5	0	0	0	2
2013	Slovenia	OGQ	3	0	0	0	2
2013	Slovenia	WC	7	0	1	1	2
2014	Slovenia	OG	5	0	0	0	6
2014	Slovenia	WC D1A	5	1	2	3	4
2015	Slovenia	WC	2	0	0	0	0
2018	Slovenia	OG	1	0	0	0	0
2018	Slovenia	WC D1A	5	0	0	0	6
2020	Slovenia	OGQ	3	0	0	0	2
2021	Slovenia	OGQ	3	0	0	0	2
2023	Slovenia	WC	7	0	0	0	0
2024	Slovenia	OGQ	3	0	1	1	0
Junior totals			15	2	7	9	28
Senior totals			65	2	6	8	36
