= Mitja Robar =

Slovenian ice hockey player

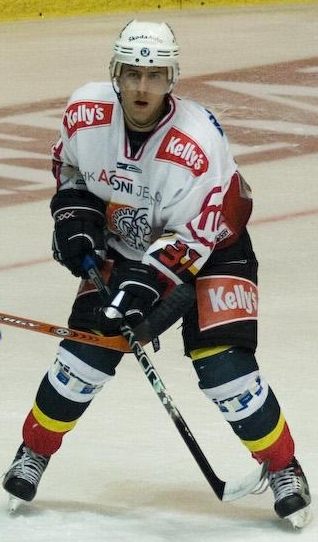
- Born: 4 January 1983 (age 43) Maribor, SFR Yugoslavia
- Height: 5 ft 10 in (178 cm)
- Weight: 190 lb (86 kg; 13 st 8 lb)
- Position: Defence
- Shot: Left
- Played for: HDK Maribor; HK Slavija Ljubljana; HDD Olimpija Ljubljana; HK Acroni Jesenice; HD Mladi Jesenice; IK Oskarshamn; Lukko; Krefeld Pinguine; BK Mladá Boleslav; EC KAC; KHL Medveščak Zagreb; HK Olimpija
- National team: Slovenia
- NHL draft: Undrafted
- Playing career: 2000–2022

Mitja Robar (born 4 January 1983) is a retired Slovenian ice hockey player.

== Playing career ==
Robar has spent the majority of his career in Slovenia, playing for HDK Maribor, HK Slavija Ljubljana and HDD Olimpija Ljubljana of the Slovenian Championship league. In 2011 he was under a try-out contract with the Växjö Lakers Hockey of the Elitserien (SEL) until 15 October 2011. However, he was subsequently loaned to IK Oskarshamn of the HockeyAllsvenskan (Swe-1) after failing to make the Lakers' startup lines.

After being denied an extended contract, Robar moved to Finland to sign a one-year contract (with an optional one-year extension) with Lukko of the SM-liiga.

On 27 June 2016, Robar signed his first contract as a free agent in Austria, agreeing to a one-year deal with EC KAC.

He participated at several IIHF World Championships as a member of the Slovenia men's national ice hockey team.

== Career statistics ==
=== Regular season and playoffs ===
			Regular season					Playoffs
Season	Team	League	GP	G	A	Pts	PIM	GP	G	A	Pts	PIM
1999–2000	HDK Maribor	SVN
2000–01	HDK Maribor	SVN	19	0	7	7	30	—	—	—	—	—
2001–02	HDK Maribor	SVN	13	3	0	3	43	—	—	—	—	—
2002–03	HDK Maribor	SVN U20	16	9	8	17	65	2	0	0	0	8
2002–03	HDK Maribor	SVN	24	9	14	23	36	—	—	—	—	—
2003–04	HK Slavija	IEHL	8	0	1	1	12	—	—	—	—	—
2003–04	HK Slavija	SVN	7	1	0	1	6	4	0	0	0	0
2003–04	HDK Maribor	SVN	15	6	4	10	20	—	—	—	—	—
2004–05	HDD Olimpija Ljubljana	IEHL	20	1	3	4	4	—	—	—	—	—
2004–05	HDD Olimpija Ljubljana	SVN	23	2	3	5	38	—	—	—	—	—
2005–06	HDD Olimpija Ljubljana	IEHL	6	1	2	3	6	5	0	0	0	8
2005–06	HDD Olimpija Ljubljana	SVN	15	4	3	7	28	—	—	—	—	—
2006–07	HK Acroni Jesenice	AUT	56	7	22	29	46	—	—	—	—	—
2006–07	HD Mladi Jesenice	SVN	1	1	0	1	2	—	—	—	—	—
2007–08	HK Acroni Jesenice	AUT	28	1	4	5	20	5	0	0	0	0
2007–08	HK Acroni Jesenice	SVN	—	—	—	—	—	8	1	4	5	2
2008–09	HK Acroni Jesenice	AUT	51	1	14	15	54	5	0	1	1	6
2008–09	HK Acroni Jesenice	SVN	—	—	—	—	—	6	0	1	1	12
2009–10	HK Acroni Jesenice	AUT	46	11	9	20	65	—	—	—	—	—
2009–10	HK Acroni Jesenice	SVN	—	—	—	—	—	1	0	1	1	0
2010–11	HK Acroni Jesenice	AUT	52	5	26	31	50	—	—	—	—	—
2010–11	HK Acroni Jesenice	SVN	4	1	5	6	4	4	0	2	2	0
2011–12	IK Oskarshamn	Allsv	9	0	3	3	6	—	—	—	—	—
2011–12	Lukko	SM-l	11	0	0	0	8	—	—	—	—	—
2011–12	Krefeld Pinguine	DEL	17	1	4	5	8	—	—	—	—	—
2012–13	Krefeld Pinguine	DEL	50	4	18	22	36	9	1	4	5	14
2013–14	Krefeld Pinguine	DEL	39	5	10	15	18	5	0	1	1	6
2014–15	BK Mladá Boleslav	ELH	46	7	19	26	32	9	2	1	3	12
2015–16	BK Mladá Boleslav	ELH	18	0	1	1	10	10	0	0	0	0
2016–17	EC KAC	AUT	48	6	10	16	57	14	0	4	4	16
2017–18	EC KAC	AUT	42	3	10	13	23	6	0	0	0	4
2018–19	KHL Medveščak Zagreb	AUT	40	0	5	5	6	—	—	—	—	—
2020–21	HDK Maribor	SVN	3	0	4	4	4	2	0	4	4	0
2021–22	HDK Maribor	SVN	11	1	2	3	18	—	—	—	—	—
2021–22	HK Olimpija	ICEHL	21	0	4	4	4	7	1	2	3	4
2021–22	HK Olimpija	SVN	—	—	—	—	—	5	0	5	5	4
SVN totals			135	28	42	70	229	30	1	17	18	18
AUT/ICEHL totals			384	34	104	138	325	37	1	7	8	30
DEL totals			106	10	32	42	62	14	1	5	6	20

=== International ===
Year	Team	Event	GP	G	A	Pts	PIM
2000	Slovenia	EJC D1	4	1	4	5	4
2001	Slovenia	WJC18 D2	4	0	3	3	20
2002	Slovenia	WJC D1	5	0	0	0	16
2003	Slovenia	WJC D1	5	1	0	1	6
2004	Slovenia	WC D1	5	2	1	3	2
2005	Slovenia	OGQ	3	0	0	0	0
2005	Slovenia	WC	6	0	0	0	6
2006	Slovenia	WC	6	0	0	0	25
2007	Slovenia	WC D1	5	0	0	0	6
2008	Slovenia	WC	5	1	1	2	4
2009	Slovenia	OGQ	3	0	0	0	0
2009	Slovenia	WC D1	5	2	3	5	4
2011	Slovenia	WC	6	0	2	2	4
2012	Slovenia	WC D1A	5	1	3	4	0
2013	Slovenia	OGQ	3	0	0	0	0
2013	Slovenia	WC	7	0	2	2	2
2014	Slovenia	OG	5	0	1	1	0
2014	Slovenia	WC D1A	5	0	2	2	6
2015	Slovenia	WC	7	0	0	0	2
2016	Slovenia	OGQ	3	0	1	1	25
2017	Slovenia	WC	7	0	0	0	12
2018	Slovenia	OG	4	0	0	0	0
Junior totals			18	2	7	9	46
Senior totals			90	6	16	22	98
