= Sabahudin Kovačevič =

Slovenian ice hockey player

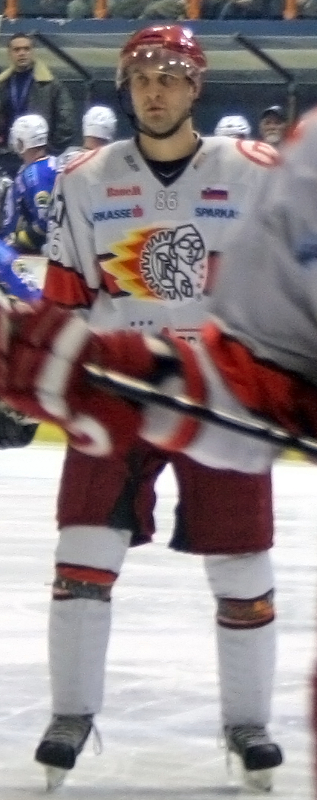
- Born: February 26, 1986 (age 39); Jesenice, Yugoslavia
- Height: 6 ft 3 in (191 cm)
- Weight: 209 lb (95 kg; 14 st 13 lb)
- Position: Defence
- Shot: Right
- Played for: Vlada Boleslav; Graz 99ers HK Acroni Jesenice; HC Asiago; HC Alleghe; Herning Blue Fox; HK SKP Poprad; Saryarka Karagandy
- National team: Slovenia
- NHL draft: Undrafted
- Playing career: 2005–2019

Sabahudin Kovačevič (born February 26, 1986) is a Slovenian former professional ice hockey player. He participated in several IIHF World Championships as a member of the Slovenia men's national ice hockey team.

His older brother Senad (born 1981) is also a former ice hockey player.

== Career statistics ==
=== Regular season and playoffs ===
			Regular season					Playoffs
Season	Team	League	GP	G	A	Pts	PIM	GP	G	A	Pts	PIM
2002–03	HD Mladi Jesenice	SVN U20	8	0	1	1	6	—	—	—	—	—
2002–03	HK Kranjska Gora	SVN	3	0	0	0	0	—	—	—	—	—
2003–04	HD Mladi Jesenice	SVN U20	17	5	4	9	14	5	1	1	2	0
2003–04	HK Kranjska Gora	SVN	15	0	0	0	4	4	0	0	0	0
2004–05	HD Mladi Jesenice	SVN U20	18	7	8	15	51	2	1	1	2	2
2004–05	HK Kranjska Gora	SVN	28	1	5	6	32	—	—	—	—	—
2005–06	HK Acroni Jesenice	IEHL	5	0	0	0	0	—	—	—	—	—
2005–06	HK Kranjska Gora	SVN	31	10	13	23	118	—	—	—	—	—
2006–07	HD Mladi Jesenice	SVN	22	5	7	12	91	—	—	—	—	—
2006–07	HK Acroni Jesenice	AUT	4	0	0	0	0	—	—	—	—	—
2007–08	HK Acroni Jesenice	AUT	45	2	3	5	38	5	0	1	1	0
2007–08	HK Acroni Jesenice	SVN	—	—	—	—	—	8	2	1	3	20
2008–09	HK Acroni Jesenice	AUT	54	10	14	24	69	5	0	1	1	6
2008–09	HK Acroni Jesenice	SVN	—	—	—	—	—	6	1	1	2	8
2009–10	HK Acroni Jesenice	AUT	51	7	12	19	59	—	—	—	—	—
2009–10	HK Acroni Jesenice	SVN	4	1	2	3	2	6	1	4	5	29
2010–11	Asiago Hockey 1935	ITA	13	0	4	4	6	—	—	—	—	—
2010–11	Alleghe Hockey	ITA	20	2	1	3	8	5	1	1	2	6
2011–12	Herning Blue Fox	DNK	16	1	5	6	14	—	—	—	—	—
2011–12	HK AutoFinance Poprad	SVK	36	3	14	17	51	6	0	0	0	8
2012–13	HK AutoFinance Poprad	SVK	54	7	14	21	65	7	1	0	1	2
2013–14	Saryarka Karagandy	VHL	44	9	12	21	10	19	1	8	9	4
2014–15	Kuban Krasnodar	VHL	26	0	6	6	6	—	—	—	—	—
2014–15	Saryarka Karagandy	VHL	4	0	1	1	2	—	—	—	—	—
2014–15	Graz99ers	AUT	13	0	2	2	6	—	—	—	—	—
2015–16	Graz99ers	AUT	48	4	14	18	26	—	—	—	—	—
2016–17	Yunost Minsk	BLR	26	3	10	13	34	9	0	2	2	0
2017–18	HC Nové Zámky	SVK	16	0	3	3	51	—	—	—	—	—
2017–18	HC Energie Karlovy Vary	CZE.2	19	3	9	12	12	8	1	4	5	4
2018–19	HC Energie Karlovy Vary	ELH	35	1	4	5	10	—	—	—	—	—
2018–19	BK Mladá Boleslav	ELH	12	3	1	4	2	10	0	2	2	0
SVN totals			103	20	24	44	247	24	4	6	10	57
AUT totals			215	23	45	68	198	10	0	2	2	6
SVK totals			106	10	31	41	167	13	1	0	1	10

=== International ===
Year	Team	Event	GP	G	A	Pts	PIM
2004	Slovenia	WJC18 D1	4	0	2	2	0
2005	Slovenia	WJC D1	5	0	0	0	0
2006	Slovenia	WJC D1	5	0	2	2	8
2009	Slovenia	OGQ	3	0	0	0	0
2009	Slovenia	WC D1	5	1	3	4	2
2010	Slovenia	WC D1	5	2	2	4	0
2011	Slovenia	WC	6	0	0	0	0
2012	Slovenia	WC D1A	5	0	1	1	10
2013	Slovenia	OGQ	3	0	0	0	0
2013	Slovenia	WC	7	0	0	0	6
2014	Slovenia	OG	4	1	1	2	2
2015	Slovenia	WC	7	0	2	2	2
2016	Slovenia	WC D1A	5	1	3	4	4
2016	Slovenia	OGQ	3	1	1	2	0
2017	Slovenia	WC	7	0	1	1	4
2018	Slovenia	OG	4	0	0	0	0
2018	Slovenia	WC D1A	5	3	0	3	0
2019	Slovenia	WC D1A	5	0	2	2	0
Junior totals			14	0	4	4	8
Senior totals			74	9	16	25	30
