= Ed Kastelic =

Canadian ice hockey player

- Born: January 29, 1964 (age 62) Toronto, Ontario, Canada
- Height: 6 ft 3 in (191 cm)
- Weight: 212 lb (96 kg; 15 st 2 lb)
- Position: Right wing
- Shot: Right
- Played for: Washington Capitals; Hartford Whalers
- NHL draft: 110th overall, 1982; Washington Capitals
- Playing career: 1984–1999

Edward P. Kastelic (born January 29, 1964) is a Canadian former professional ice hockey player. Kastelic played for the Washington Capitals and Hartford Whalers of the National Hockey League (NHL).

Kastelic was drafted in 1982 by the Washington Capitals. He would play in Europe for several years before retiring from active professional play. Kastelic was featured as one of the 30 profiles in "Hockey's Toughest Talk" by Brian D'Ambrosio.

Kastelic played 4 games for the Slovenia men's national ice hockey team in 1998, scoring 1 goal and 1 assist.

After his retirement, he moved to Phoenix, Arizona. He became a youth hockey coach and fitness instructor, teaching his own "Propulse" program. His son Mark Kastelic is a professional ice hockey player.

== Career statistics ==
			Regular season					Playoffs
Season	Team	League	GP	G	A	Pts	PIM	GP	G	A	Pts	PIM
1981–82	London Knights	OHL	68	5	18	23	63	4	0	1	1	4
1982–83	London Knights	OHL	68	12	11	23	96	3	0	0	0	5
1983–84	London Knights	OHL	68	17	16	33	218	8	0	2	2	41
1984–85	Fort Wayne Komets	IHL	5	1	0	1	37	—	—	—	—	—
1984–85	Moncton Golden Flames	AHL	62	5	11	16	187	—	—	—	—	—
1984–85	Binghamton Whalers	AHL	4	0	0	0	7	—	—	—	—	—
1985–86	Binghamton Whalers	AHL	23	7	9	16	76	—	—	—	—	—
1985–86	Washington Capitals	NHL	15	0	0	0	73	—	—	—	—	—
1986–87	Binghamton Whalers	AHL	48	17	11	28	124	—	—	—	—	—
1986–87	Washington Capitals	NHL	23	1	1	2	83	5	1	0	1	13
1987–88	Binghamton Whalers	AHL	6	4	1	5	6	—	—	—	—	—
1987–88	Washington Capitals	NHL	35	1	0	1	78	1	0	0	0	19
1988–89	Binghamton Whalers	AHL	35	9	6	15	124	—	—	—	—	—
1988–89	Hartford Whalers	NHL	10	0	2	2	15	—	—	—	—	—
1989–90	Hartford Whalers	NHL	67	6	2	8	198	2	0	0	0	0
1990–91	Hartford Whalers	NHL	45	2	2	4	211	—	—	—	—	—
1991–92	Hartford Whalers	NHL	25	1	3	4	61	—	—	—	—	—
1992–93	Phoenix Roadrunners	IHL	57	11	7	18	158	—	—	—	—	—
1993–94	Binghamton Rangers	AHL	44	3	6	9	119	—	—	—	—	—
1994–95	Olimpija Ljubljana	Slovenia	30	20	15	35	48	—	—	—	—	—
1995–96	Olimpija Ljubljana	Slovenia	41	18	22	40	161	—	—	—	—	—
1996–97	Olimpija Ljubljana	Slovenia	48	28	26	54	149	—	—	—	—	—
1997–98	Star Bulls Rosenheim	DEL	42	2	4	6	108	—	—	—	—	—
1998–99	Olimpija Ljubljana	Slovenia	17	4	5	9	47	—	—	—	—	—
NHL totals			220	11	10	21	719	8	1	0	1	32
AHL totals			222	45	44	89	643	—	—	—	—	—
