= Luka Vidmar =

Slovenian ice hockey player (born 1986)

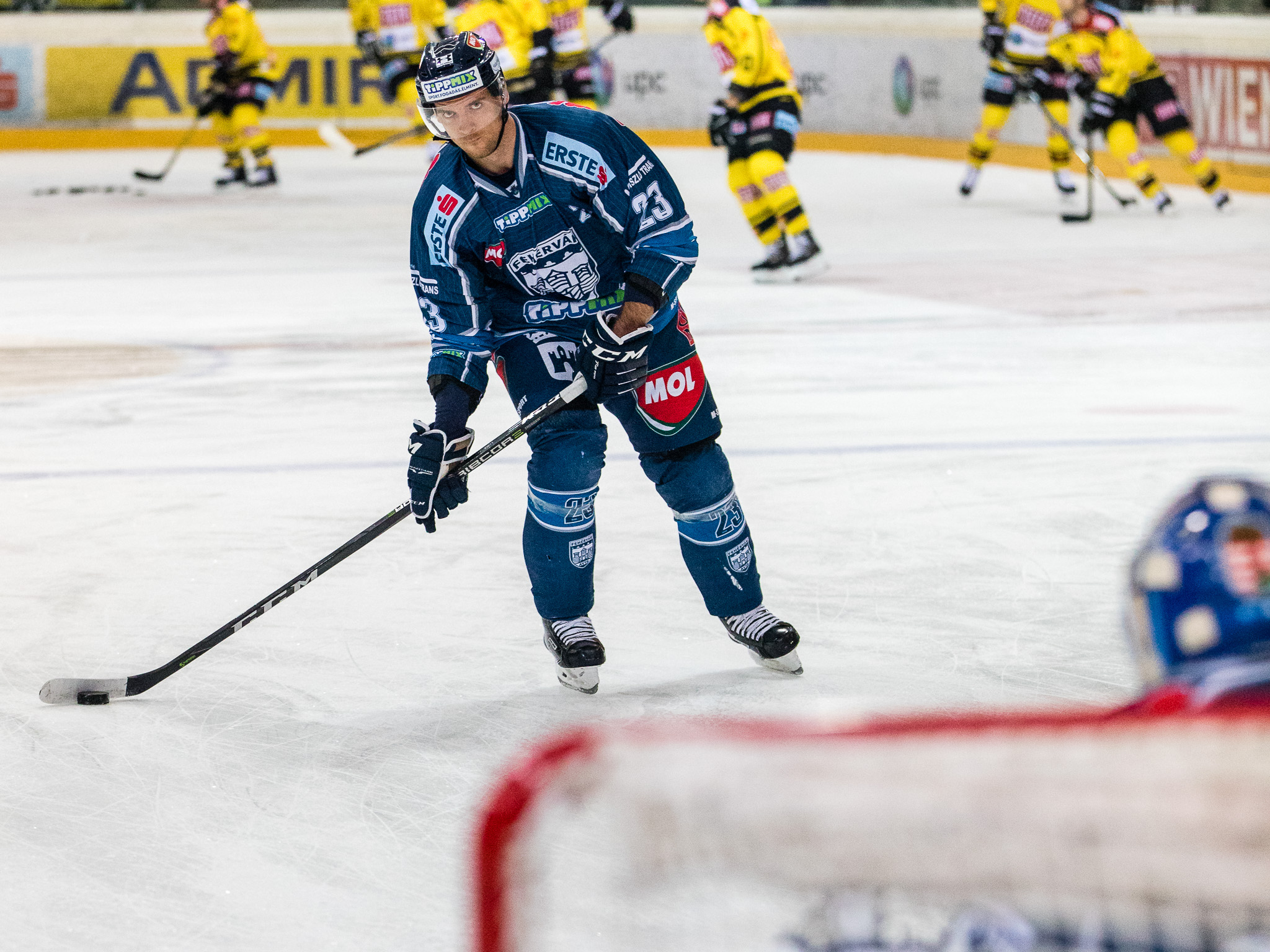
- Born: May 17, 1986 (age 39) Ljubljana, SFR Yugoslavia
- Height: 6 ft 1 in (185 cm)
- Weight: 192 lb (87 kg; 13 st 10 lb)
- Position: Defence
- Shot: Right
- Metal Ligaen team Former teams: SønderjyskE Ishockey; Fehérvár AV19; HDD Olimpija Ljubljana; Las Vegas Wranglers; Colorado Eagles; South Carolina Stingrays; Rochester Americans; BK Mladá Boleslav; Stjernen; Frederikshavn White Hawks
- National team: Slovenia
- NHL draft: Undrafted
- Playing career: 2002–2021

Luka Vidmar (born May 17, 1986) is a Slovenian professional ice hockey defenceman. He is currently playing for the SønderjyskE Ishockey of the Danish Metal Ligaen.

== Playing career ==
After playing as a youth professionally for HDD Olimpija Ljubljana in the Slovenian Ice Hockey League, Vidmar moved to North America and attended the University of Alaska Anchorage where he played fours seasons of NCAA Division I ice hockey with the Alaska Anchorage Seawolves men's ice hockey team. He accumulated 33 points and 135 penalty minutes in 114 games with the Seawolves.

Vidmar began the 2011–12 ECHL season with the Las Vegas Wranglers where he played three games before signing with the Colorado Eagles on November 11, 2011.

Prior to the 2012–13 season, Vidmar remained in the ECHL after signing as a free agent with the South Carolina Stingrays on October 5, 2012.

After 10 years of playing in North America, Vidmar returned to Europe to sign a try-out contract with BK Mladá Boleslav of the Czech Extraliga on July 24, 2014.

== Career statistics ==
=== Regular season and playoffs ===
			Regular season					Playoffs
Season	Team	League	GP	G	A	Pts	PIM	GP	G	A	Pts	PIM
2002–03	HDD Olimpija Ljubljana	SVN U20	13	3	6	9	8	5	1	1	2	2
2002–03	HDD Olimpija Ljubljana	SVN	15	0	1	1	6	—	—	—	—	—
2003–04	HDD Olimpija Ljubljana	SVN U20	18	6	9	15	12	5	0	1	1	0
2003–04	HDD Olimpija Ljubljana	SVN	16	6	4	10	8	—	—	—	—	—
2004–05	HDD Olimpija Ljubljana	SVN U20	18	11	16	27	30	4	4	3	7	2
2004–05	HDD Olimpija Ljubljana	SVN	21	8	6	14	12	—	—	—	—	—
2005–06	Chicago Steel	USHL	47	3	6	9	24	—	—	—	—	—
2006–07	Chicago Steel	USHL	57	6	22	28	74	5	0	4	4	14
2007–08	University of Alaska Anchorage	WCHA	30	1	5	6	37	—	—	—	—	—
2008–09	University of Alaska Anchorage	WCHA	30	1	4	5	32	—	—	—	—	—
2009–10	University of Alaska Anchorage	WCHA	20	2	10	12	30	—	—	—	—	—
2010–11	University of Alaska Anchorage	WCHA	34	2	8	10	38	—	—	—	—	—
2011–12	Las Vegas Wranglers	ECHL	3	0	0	0	0	—	—	—	—	—
2011–12	Colorado Eagles	ECHL	58	3	18	21	56	3	0	1	1	0
2012–13	South Carolina Stingrays	ECHL	62	6	21	27	22	1	0	0	0	0
2013–14	South Carolina Stingrays	ECHL	57	2	12	14	28	3	1	0	1	2
2013–14	Rochester Americans	AHL	6	0	0	0	6	—	—	—	—	—
2014–15	BK Mladá Boleslav	ELH	30	0	2	2	26	3	0	0	0	4
2015–16	Stjernen Hockey	NOR	18	4	15	19	20	6	2	3	5	6
2016–17	Frederikshavn White Hawks	DEN	45	4	21	25	20	15	1	9	10	6
2017–18	Fehérvár AV19	AUT	46	2	15	17	22	—	—	—	—	—
2018–19	HK Olimpija	AlpsHL	5	0	5	5	6	16	3	9	12	10
2018–19	HK Olimpija	SVN	1	0	1	1	0	2	0	0	0	2
2019–20	HC Bolzano	AUT	11	0	1	1	6	—	—	—	—	—
2019–20	SønderjyskE	DEN	11	0	1	1	2	—	—	—	—	—
2020–21	HK Olimpija	AlpsHL	11	1	4	5	2	11	1	5	6	4
2020–21	HK Olimpija	SVN	—	—	—	—	—	5	0	0	0	6
SVN totals			53	14	12	26	26	7	0	0	0	8
ECHL totals			180	11	51	62	106	7	1	1	2	2

=== International ===
Year	Team	Event	Result	GP	G	A	Pts	PIM
2003	Slovenia	WJC18 D1	13th	5	2	2	4	2
2004	Slovenia	WJC18 D1	12th	1	0	0	0	0
2005	Slovenia	WJC D1	14th	5	2	4	6	2
2006	Slovenia	WJC D1	15th	5	2	2	4	4
2010	Slovenia	WC D1	18th	3	0	0	0	2
2015	Slovenia	WC	16th	7	0	0	0	2
2016	Slovenia	WC D1A	17th	5	0	0	0	0
2016	Slovenia	OGQ	Q	3	0	0	0	0
2017	Slovenia	WC	15th	7	0	1	1	4
2018	Slovenia	OG	9th	4	0	1	1	4
2018	Slovenia	WC D1A	21st	4	0	2	2	2
Junior totals				16	6	8	14	8
Senior totals				33	0	4	4	14
