= Cory Laylin =

American ice hockey defenseman

- Born: January 24, 1970 (age 56) St. Cloud, Minnesota, U.S.
- Height: 5 ft 10 in (178 cm)
- Weight: 170 lb (77 kg; 12 st 2 lb)
- Position: Defence
- Shot: Left
- Played for: EK Zell am See; EC VSV; HC Gherdëina; Asiago Hockey; Iserlohn Roosters; Frankfurt Lions; Frederikshavn White Hawks
- NHL draft: 214th overall, 1988; Pittsburgh Penguins
- Playing career: 1992–2008

Cory Laylin
Current position
- Title: Assistant coach
- Team: Minnesota
- Conference: B1G

Biographical details
- Education: University of Minnesota

Coaching career (HC unless noted)
- 2008–2010: Hamline (assistant)
- 2010–2011: Buffalo HS
- 2011–2012: Kaltern/Caldaro
- 2012–2014: Brookings Blizzard
- 2014–2021: Hamline
- 2018: USA U18 (assistant)
- 2019: USA U18
- 2021–26: St. Thomas (assistant)

Cory Laylin (born January 24, 1970) is an American former professional ice hockey and roller hockey defenseman.

== Career ==
Laylin was drafted 214th overall by the Pittsburgh Penguins in the 1988 NHL entry draft from St. Cloud Apollo High School. He then committed to the University of Minnesota and played for the Minnesota Golden Gophers men's ice hockey team for four seasons before turning professional in 1992.

Laylin played the majority of his professional career in Europe. He played in the Austrian Hockey League for EK Zell am See and EC VSV, the Serie A for HC Gherdëina and Asiago Hockey, the Deutsche Eishockey Liga for the Iserlohn Roosters and Frankfurt Lions and the Metal Ligaen for the Frederikshavn White Hawks.

Laylin also played in Roller Hockey International, playing for the Minnesota Arctic Blast in 1994 and 1996, the San Jose Rhinos in 1997 and the Minnesota Blue Ox in 1999.

== Career statistics ==
			Regular season					Playoffs
Season	Team	League	GP	G	A	Pts	PIM	GP	G	A	Pts	PIM
1988–89	University of Minnesota	NCAA	47	14	10	24	24	—	—	—	—	—
1989–90	University of Minnesota	NCAA	39	13	14	27	31	—	—	—	—	—
1990–91	University of Minnesota	NCAA	40	12	13	25	24	—	—	—	—	—
1991–92	University of Minnesota	NCAA	44	19	12	31	44	—	—	—	—	—
1992–93	Flint Bulldogs	CoHL	2	0	0	0	2	5	2	0	2	4
1994–95	EK Zell am See	Austria	34	17	21	38	—	—	—	—	—	—
1994–95	HC Thurgau	NLB	—	—	—	—	—	1	2	0	2	0
1995–96	Villacher SV	Austria	20	9	16	25	18	—	—	—	—	—
1995–96	Olimpija Ljubljana	Slovenia	20	10	22	32	—	—	—	—	—	—
1996–97	HK Bled	Slovenia	54	20	29	49	59	—	—	—	—	—
1996–97	HC Fassa	Italy2	12	4	7	11	12	—	—	—	—	—
1997–98	HC Gherdëina	Italy	48	17	45	62	44	—	—	—	—	—
1998–99	HC Asiago	Alpenliga	23	13	26	39	25	—	—	—	—	—
1998–99	HC Asiago	Italy	13	3	13	16	6	3	1	0	1	4
1999–00	Iserlohner EC	Germany2	50	28	36	64	38	3	4	2	6	6
2000–01	San Diego Gulls	WCHL	27	9	18	27	20	13	4	7	11	4
2000–01	SC Bietigheim-Bissingen	Germany2	25	9	21	30	16	4	1	1	2	2
2001–02	Iserlohn Roosters	DEL	58	17	32	49	26	—	—	—	—	—
2001–02	San Diego Gulls	WCHL	7	2	0	2	0	7	1	2	3	0
2002–03	Frankfurt Lions	DEL	52	1	22	23	30	—	—	—	—	—
2003–04	HC Sierre	NLB	43	13	19	32	14	—	—	—	—	—
2004–05	Rockford IceHogs	UHL	36	4	13	17	19	—	—	—	—	—
2004–05	Wölfe Freiburg	Germany2	16	3	9	12	20	—	—	—	—	—
2005–06	Frederikshavn White Hawks	Denmark	33	5	20	25	12	7	1	7	8	12
2006–07	Frederikshavn White Hawks	Denmark	24	3	9	12	22	5	0	2	2	0
2007–08	Bloomington PrairieThunder	IHL	32	7	16	23	8	—	—	—	—	—
2007–08	EV Landsberg 2000	Germany2	18	4	7	11	8	—	—	—	—	—
DEL totals			110	18	54	72	56	6	3	3	6	4
