= John Jakopin =

Canadian ice hockey player (born 1975)

- Born: May 16, 1975 (age 50) Toronto, Ontario, Canada
- Height: 6 ft 5 in (196 cm)
- Weight: 239 lb (108 kg; 17 st 1 lb)
- Position: Defenceman
- Shot: Right
- Played for: Florida Panthers; Pittsburgh Penguins; San Jose Sharks
- NHL draft: 97th overall, 1993; Detroit Red Wings
- Playing career: 1997–2005

Janez Leo "John" Jakopin (born May 16, 1975) is a Canadian former professional ice hockey defenceman who played in the National Hockey League (NHL) for the Florida Panthers, Pittsburgh Penguins and the San Jose Sharks between 1998 and 2002. He has Slovene roots.

== Career ==
Jakopin was born in Toronto, Ontario. As a youth, he played in the 1989 Quebec International Pee-Wee Hockey Tournament with the Toronto Marlboros minor ice hockey team. He was drafted 97th overall by the Detroit Red Wings in the 1993 NHL entry draft and played a total of 113 regular season games, scoring one goal and six assists for seven points, collecting 145 penalty minutes. He spent most of his career bouncing around the league, playing mostly in the American Hockey League. He retired in 2005 after a spell with HDD Olimpija Ljubljana in Slovenia.

== Career statistics ==
=== Regular season and playoffs ===
			Regular season					Playoffs
Season	Team	League	GP	G	A	Pts	PIM	GP	G	A	Pts	PIM
1992–93	St. Michael's Buzzers	MetJAHL	45	9	21	30	42	13	3	2	5	4
1993–94	Merrimack College	H-East	36	2	8	10	64	—	—	—	—	—
1994–95	Merrimack College	HE	37	4	10	14	42	—	—	—	—	—
1995–96	Merrimack College	HE	32	10	15	25	68	—	—	—	—	—
1996–97	Merrimack College	HE	31	4	12	16	68	—	—	—	—	—
1996–97	Adirondack Red Wings	AHL	3	0	0	0	9	—	—	—	—	—
1997–98	Florida Panthers	NHL	2	0	0	0	4	—	—	—	—	—
1997–98	Beast of New Haven	AHL	60	2	18	20	151	3	0	0	0	0
1998–99	Florida Panthers	NHL	3	0	0	0	0	—	—	—	—	—
1998–99	Beast of New Haven	AHL	60	2	7	9	154	—	—	—	—	—
1999–00	Florida Panthers	NHL	17	0	0	0	26	—	—	—	—	—
1999–00	Louisville Panthers	AHL	23	4	6	10	47	—	—	—	—	—
2000–01	Florida Panthers	NHL	60	1	2	3	62	—	—	—	—	—
2000–01	Louisville Panthers	AHL	8	0	1	1	21	—	—	—	—	—
2001–02	Pittsburgh Penguins	NHL	19	0	4	4	42	—	—	—	—	—
2001–02	Wilkes-Barre/Scranton Penguins	AHL	30	3	5	8	90	—	—	—	—	—
2002–03	San Jose Sharks	NHL	12	0	0	0	11	—	—	—	—	—
2002–03	Cleveland Barons	AHL	18	0	4	4	27	—	—	—	—	—
2003–04	Hartford Wolf Pack	AHL	42	3	4	7	99	—	—	—	—	—
2003–04	Binghamton Senators	AHL	11	1	0	1	4	2	0	0	0	2
2004–05	Olimpija Ljubljana	IEHL	3	0	0	0	37	—	—	—	—	—
2004–05	Olimpija Ljubljana	SVN	2	0	2	2	0	—	—	—	—	—
AHL totals			255	15	45	60	602	5	0	0	0	2
NHL totals			113	1	6	7	145	—	—	—	—	—

== Awards and honors ==
Award	Year
All-Hockey East Rookie Team	1993–94
Yanick Dupre Memorial Award (AHL)	1997–98
