= Stanislav Medřík =

Slovak ice hockey player

Personal information
- Nationality: Slovak
- Born: 4 April 1966 (age 59) Nitra, Czechoslovakia

Sport
- Sport: Ice hockey

Stanislav Medřík (born 4 April 1966) is a Slovak ice hockey player. He competed in the men's tournament at the 1994 Winter Olympics.

== Career statistics ==
=== Regular season and playoffs ===
| | | | Regular season | | | | | Playoffs |
| Season | Team | League | GP | G | A | Pts | PIM | GP | G | A | Pts | PIM |
|---|---|---|---|---|---|---|---|---|---|---|---|---|
| 1983–84 | ASVŠ Dukla Trenčín | TCH | 3 | 0 | 0 | 0 | 2 | — | — | — | — | — |
| 1984–85 | ASVŠ Dukla Trenčín | TCH | 36 | 0 | 3 | 3 | 20 | — | — | — | — | — |
| 1986–87 | ASVŠ Dukla Trenčín | TCH | 33 | 2 | 1 | 3 | 12 | — | — | — | — | — |
| 1987–88 | ASVŠ Dukla Trenčín | TCH | 38 | 3 | 10 | 13 | | — | — | — | — | — |
| 1988–89 | ASVŠ Dukla Trenčín | TCH | 34 | 2 | 5 | 7 | 13 | 4 | 0 | 0 | 0 |
| 1989–90 | ASVŠ Dukla Trenčín | TCH | 51 | 6 | 11 | 17 | | — | — | — | — | — |
| 1990–91 | ASVŠ Dukla Trenčín | TCH | 58 | 3 | 17 | 20 | | — | — | — | — | — |
| 1991–92 | EK Zell am See | AUT | 12 | 1 | 4 | 5 | | — | — | — | — | — |
| 1992–93 | ASVŠ Dukla Trenčín | TCH | 49 | 6 | 17 | 23 | | — | — | — | — | — |
| 1993–94 | Dukla Trenčín | SVK | 43 | 6 | 19 | 25 | | — | — | — | — | — |
| 1994–95 | Dukla Trenčín | SVK | 36 | 13 | 20 | 33 | 44 | 9 | 2 | 2 | 4 | 6 |
| 1995–96 | AC ZPS Zlín | ELH | 36 | 2 | 10 | 12 | 12 | 5 | 2 | 1 | 3 | 2 |
| 1996–97 | HC ZPS-Barum Zlín | ELH | 47 | 9 | 10 | 19 | 14 | — | — | — | — | — |
| 1996–97 | Dukla Trenčín | SVK | 3 | 0 | 2 | 2 | 0 | — | — | — | — | — |
| 1997–98 | Braunlager EHC/Harz | DEU.2 | 57 | 12 | 41 | 53 | 40 | — | — | — | — | — |
| 1998–99 | Dukla Trenčín | SVK | 42 | 2 | 8 | 10 | 10 | 3 | 0 | 0 | 0 | 0 |
| 1999–2000 | MsHK Žilina | SVK.2 | 36 | 5 | 15 | 20 | 38 | — | — | — | — | — |
| 1999–2000 | HKm Zvolen | SVK | 3 | 0 | 0 | 0 | 0 | — | — | — | — | — |
| 2000–01 | EV Ravensburg | DEU.4 | 17 | 3 | 17 | 20 | 8 | — | — | — | — | — |
| 2000–01 | ESC Erfurt | DEU.3 | 14 | 2 | 6 | 8 | 2 | — | — | — | — | — |
| 2001–02 | Spartak Dubnica nad Váhom | IEHL | 16 | 3 | 4 | 7 | 20 | — | — | — | — | — |
| TCH totals | | | 302 | 22 | 64 | 86 | — | 4 | 0 | 0 | 0 | — |
| SVK totals | | | 127 | 21 | 49 | 70 | 54 | 12 | 2 | 2 | 4 | 6 |

=== International ===
| Year | Team | Event | GP | G | A | Pts | PIM |
|---|---|---|---|---|---|---|---|
| 1983 | Czechoslovakia | EJC |
| 1984 | Czechoslovakia | EJC |
| 1985 | Czechoslovakia | WJC | 7 | 0 | 0 | 0 | 4 |
| 1986 | Czechoslovakia | WJC | 7 | 0 | 2 | 2 | 10 |
| 1991 | Czechoslovakia | WC | 10 | 0 | 1 | 1 | 2 |
| 1994 | Slovakia | OG | 8 | 0 | 0 | 0 | 4 |
| 1994 | Slovakia | WC C | 6 | 1 | 4 | 5 | 2 |
| 1995 | Slovakia | WC B | 7 | 1 | 5 | 6 | 4 |
| 1996 | Slovakia | WC | 5 | 2 | 0 | 2 | 0 |
| 1996 | Slovakia | WCH | 1 | 0 | 0 | 0 | 0 |
| 1997 | Slovakia | WC | 7 | 0 | 0 | 0 | 0 |
| Senior totals | | | 44 | 4 | 10 | 14 | 12 |

"Stanislav Medrik". Elite Prospects.
