= Kraig Nienhuis =

Canadian ice hockey player

- Born: May 9, 1961 (age 64) Sarnia, Ontario, Canada
- Height: 6 ft 1 in (185 cm)
- Weight: 205 lb (93 kg; 14 st 9 lb)
- Position: Left wing
- Shot: Left
- Played for: Boston Bruins
- National team: Canada and Austria
- NHL draft: Undrafted
- Playing career: 1985–2001

Kraig Nienhuis (born May 9, 1961) is a Canadian-Austrian former professional ice hockey player who played 87 games in the National Hockey League (NHL) over parts of three seasons for the Boston Bruins. After three years at RPI, he was signed as a free agent by the Bruins in 1985. Nienhuis played in 13 leagues over the course of his career and enjoyed most of his success in Europe. After becoming an Austrian citizen, he played for the Austria national ice hockey team at the 1996 IIHF ice hockey world championships.

== Career statistics ==
=== Regular season and playoffs ===
			Regular season					Playoffs
Season	Team	League	GP	G	A	Pts	PIM	GP	G	A	Pts	PIM
1980–81	Sarnia Bees	WOHL	34	7	10	17	24	—	—	—	—	—
1981–82	Sarnia Bees	WOHL	—	—	—	—	—	—	—	—	—	—
1982–83	Rensselaer Polytechnic Institute	NCAA	24	9	11	20	34	—	—	—	—	—
1983–84	Rensselaer Polytechnic Institute	NCAA	35	10	12	22	26	—	—	—	—	—
1984–85	Rensselaer Polytechnic Institute	NCAA	36	11	10	21	55	—	—	—	—	—
1985–86	Boston Bruins	NHL	70	16	14	30	37	2	0	0	0	14
1986–87	Boston Bruins	NHL	16	4	2	6	2	—	—	—	—	—
1986–87	Moncton Golden Flames	AHL	54	10	17	27	44	—	—	—	—	—
1987–88	Boston Bruins	NHL	1	0	0	0	0	—	—	—	—	—
1987–88	Maine Mariners	AHL	36	16	17	33	57	—	—	—	—	—
1988–89	ESV Kaufbeuren	GER	35	23	28	51	80	—	—	—	—	—
1989–90	EHC Uzwil	NLB	12	11	14	25	34	—	—	—	—	—
1989–90	EHC Chur	NLB	6	8	9	17	11	—	—	—	—	—
1989–90	Mannheimer ERC	GER	13	7	4	11	18	—	—	—	—	—
1990–91	Albany Choppers	IHL	3	3	1	4	0	—	—	—	—	—
1990–91	Klagenfurter AC	AUT	30	31	22	53	66	—	—	—	—	—
1991–92	Klagenfurter AC	AUT	43	35	28	63	69	—	—	—	—	—
1992–93	Klagenfurter AC	AUT	48	40	46	86	38	—	—	—	—	—
1993–94	Klagenfurter AC	AUT	33	19	27	46	42	—	—	—	—	—
1994–95	HDD Olimpija Ljubljana	SLO	36	53	38	91	93	—	—	—	—	—
1995–96	HDD Olimpija Ljubljana	SLO	46	40	37	77	44	—	—	—	—	—
1996–97	Eisbären Berlin	DEL	48	12	22	34	79	8	0	0	0	10
1997–98	Nottingham Panthers	BISL	42	21	24	45	43	6	0	5	5	8
1998–99	Milano Vipers	ITA	7	4	6	10	12	—	—	—	—	—
1998–99	Port Huron Border Cats	UHL	29	15	22	37	12	7	3	4	7	4
1999–00	Port Huron Border Cats	UHL	37	13	22	35	33	—	—	—	—	—
2000–01	Port Huron Border Cats	UHL	16	9	10	19	28	—	—	—	—	—
NHL totals			87	20	16	36	39	2	0	0	0	14
