= 1994–95 Slovenian Hockey League season =

- League: Slovenian Ice Hockey League
- Sport: Ice hockey
- Regular-season winner: Olimpija
- Champions: Olimpija
- Runners-up: Jesenice

Slovenian Ice Hockey League seasons
- ← 1993–94 1995–96 →

The 1994–95 Slovenian Ice Hockey League season was the fourth season of the Slovenian Ice Hockey League.

At the end of the regular season the playoffs were held. Olimpija were the winners.

== Teams ==
- Bled
- Celje
- Jesenice
- Maribor
- Olimpija
- Slavija
- Triglav Kranj

== First part of the season ==
Rk	Team	GP	W	T	L	GF	GA	Pts
1.	Olimpija	12	11	0	1	106	22	22
2.	Jesenice	12	10	0	2	90	30	20
3.	Bled	12	7	1	4	78	35	15
4.	Celje	12	7	1	4	68	36	15
5.	Maribor	12	3	0	9	46	82	6
6.	Triglav Kranj	12	3	0	9	45	60	6
7.	Maribor	12	0	0	12	14	182	0

== Second part of the season ==
The top four teams in part two went on to the playoffs, while the bottom three determined the final three places.

Rk	Team	GP	W	T	L	GF	GA	Pts
Group A (for 1st to 4th place)
1.	Olimpija	18	16	0	2	165	33	35
2.	Jesenice	18	12	1	5	112	54	27
3.	Celje	18	10	1	7	76	85	21
4.	Bled	18	8	0	10	78	85	17
Group B (for 5th to 7th place)
5.	Triglav Kranj	16	9	0	7	79	44	19
6.	Maribor	16	4	0	12	47	109	10
7.	Slavija	16	0	0	16	25	178	0

== Play-offs ==
=== Semi-finals ===
Olimpija defeated Bled in a best of 7 series 6–1, 3–1, 4–2 and 6–2

Jesenice defeated Celje, as Celje forfeited all their matches.

=== Final ===
Olimpija defeated Jesenice 4–3 in a best of seven series.

- Olimpija – Jesenice 2-4 (1–1, 1–2, 0–1)
- Jesenice – Olimpija 1–0 (0–0, 0–0, 1–0)
- Olimpija – Jesenice 5–1 (1–1, 1–0, 3–0)
- Jesenice – Olimpija 3–4 a.p. (1–0, 1–1, 0–1, 1–2)
- Olimpija – Jesenice 6–4 (1–1, 3–2, 2–1)
- Jesenice – Olimpija 1–5 (1–1, 0–2, 0–2)

=== Third place ===
Bled defeated Celje via a forfeit.

=== Fifth to Seventh place ===
Rk	Team	GP	W	T	L	GF	GA	Pts
5.	Olimpija	4	4	0	0	40	6	11
6.	Jesenice	4	2	0	2	24	24	6
7.	Bled	4	0	0	4	9	43	1
