= 1995–96 Slovenian Hockey League season =

- League: Slovenian Ice Hockey League
- Sport: Ice hockey
- Regular-season winner: Olimpija
- Champions: Olimpija
- Runners-up: Jesenice

Slovenian Ice Hockey League seasons
- ← 1994–95 1996–97 →

The 1995–96 Slovenian Ice Hockey League season was the fifth season of the Slovenian Ice Hockey League.

At the end of the regular season the playoffs were held. Olimpija were the winners.

== Teams ==
- Bled
- Jesenice
- Maribor
- Olimpija
- Slavija
- Triglav Kranj

== Part one of the season ==
Rk	Team	GP	W	T	L	GF	GA	Pts
1.	Olimpija	20	20	0	0	220	47	40
2.	Jesenice	20	14	0	6	144	60	28
3.	Bled	20	11	0	9	103	58	22
4.	Triglav Kranj	20	10	1	9	85	83	21
5.	Slavija	20	3	1	16	46	189	7
6.	Maribor	20	1	0	19	43	204	2

== Part two of the season ==
Rk	Team	GP	W	T	L	GF	GA	Pts
1.	Olimpija	6	6	0	0	38	12	12
2.	Jesenice	6	2	1	3	17	22	5
3.	Bled	6	2	0	4	15	20	4
4.	Triglav Kranj	6	1	1	4	15	31	3

== Play-offs ==
=== Semi-finals ===
Olimpija defeated Triglav Kranj 4–0 in a best of seven series 7–2, 9–0, 14–3 and 9–5

Jesenice defeated Bled 4–2 in a best of seven series 5–2, 2–4, 3–2, 2–4, 8–2 and 5–3

=== Final ===
Olimpija defeated Jesenice 4–1 in a best of seven series.

- Olimpija – Jesenice 6–4 (2–2, 1–1, 3–1)
- Jesenice – Olimpija 1–6 (0–0, 0–4, 1–2)
- Olimpija – Jesenice 6–7 OT (2–1, 2–2, 1–2, 1–2)
- Jesenice – Olimpija 0–9 (0–2, 0–3, 0–4)
- Olimpija – Jesenice 6–1 (2–0, 4–1, 0-0)

=== Third place ===
Bled defeated Triglav 3–1 in a best of five series 3–6, 6–4, 5–2 and 5–3

=== Fifth place ===
Slavija defeated Maribor 4–1 in a best of seven 3–1, 2–3, 4–3, 5–0 and 5–2
