= 2002–03 Interliga season =

The 2002–03 Interliga season was the fourth season of the multi-national ice hockey league. Nine teams participated in the league, and Alba Volan Szekesfehervar from Hungary have won the championship.

== Regular season ==
| Place | Team | GP | Pts | W (OTW) | L (OTL) | GF–GA | GD |
|---|---|---|---|---|---|---|---|
| 1 | Alba Volán Székesfehérvár | 16 | 39 | 13 (0) | 3 (0) | 67–32 | +35 |
| 2 | Jesenice | 16 | 37 | 12 (0) | 4 (1) | 68–32 | +36 |
| 3 | Olimpija | 16 | 35 | 12 (1) | 4 (0) | 54–27 | +27 |
| 4 | Dunaújvárosi Acélbikák | 16 | 29 | 10 (2) | 6 (1) | 58–39 | +19 |
| 5 | HKm Zvolen 2 | 16 | 26 | 9 (1) | 7 (0) | 51–39 | +12 |
| 6 | Slavija | 16 | 18 | 6 (1) | 10 (1) | 37–46 | –9 |
| 7 | Medveščak | 16 | 13 | 4 (0) | 12 (1) | 26–66 | –40 |
| 8 | Vojvodina | 16 | 10 | 3 (0) | 13 (1) | 35–79 | –44 |
| 9 | Bled | 16 | 9 | 3 (0) | 13 (0) | 34–70 | –36 |

== Play-offs ==
=== Semi-finals ===
| Series | Game 1 | Game 2 |
|---|---|---|
| Dunaújvárosi Acélbikák (4) – Alba Volán Székesfehérvár (1) | 2–3 | 4–4 n.P. |
| Olimpija (3) – Jesenice (2) | 4–1 | 1–5 n.P. |

=== Final ===
| Series | Game 1 | Game 2 |
|---|---|---|
| HK Acroni Jesenice (2) – Alba Volán Székesfehérvár (1) | 2–4 | 2–2 |

== Placing round ==
- Vojvodina (8) – Zvolen 2 (5): 2–2 (2–0, 0–1, 0–1)
- Zvolen 2 – Vojvodina Novi Sad: 4–2 (2–0, 1–1, 1–1)
- Medveščak (7) – Slavija (6): 4–6 (3–4, 1–1, 0–1)
- Slavija – Medveščak : 8–2 (0–1, 2–0, 6–1)

3rd place

- Dunaújvárosi Acélbikák (4) – Olimpija (3): 6–3 (1–0, 3–0, 2–3)
- Olimpija – Dunaújvárosi Acélbikák: 1–3 (0–1, 1–0, 0–2)

5th place

- Slavija (5) – Zvolen 2 (6)
- Zvolen 2 – Slavija

7th place

- Vojvodina (8) – Medveščak (7): 2–1 (0–1, 2–0, 0–0)
- Medveščak – Vojvodina: 3–1
