= 2000–01 Interliga season =

The 2000–01 Interliga season was the second season of the multi-national ice hockey league. Nine teams participated in the league, and Olimpija from Slovenia have won the championship.

== Regular season ==
Place	Team	GP	Pts	W (OTW)	L (OTL)	GF–GA	GD
1	Olimpija	16	27	13 (2)	3 (1)	82–30	+52
2	Dunaújvárosi Acélbikák	16	26	13 (1)	3 (0)	85–33	+52
3	Alba Volán Székesfehérvár	16	26	13 (0)	3 (0)	95–42	+53
4	Jesenice	16	23	11 (0)	5 (1)	76–41	+35
5	Slavija	16	20	10 (0)	6 (0)	70–55	+15
6	Medveščak	16	11	5 (0)	11 (1)	70–87	–17
7	Ferencvárosi TC	16	6	3 (0)	13 (0)	41–93	–52
8	Red Star	16	6	3 (0)	13 (0)	38–80	–42
9	Bled	16	2	1 (0)	15 (0)	35–131	–96

== Play-offs ==
=== Semi-finals ===
Series	Game 1	Game 2
Jesenice (4) – Olimpija (1)	3–3	3–8
Alba Volán Székesfehérvár (3) – Dunaújvárosi Acélbikák (2)	4–3	6–4

=== Final ===
Series	Game 1	Game 2
Alba Volán Székesfehérvár (3) – Olimpija (1)	4–4	1–7

== Placing round ==
- Ferencvárosi TC (7) – Medveščak (6): 3–3 (1–1, 2–0, 0–2)
- Medveščak – Ferencvárosi: 7–5 (3–0, 1–2, 3–3)
- Red Star (8) – Slavija (5): 0–5
- Slavija – Red Star: 5–0

3rd place

- Jesenice (4) – Dunaújvárosi Acélbikák (2): 5–3 (3–0, 1–2, 1–1)
- Dunaújvárosi Acélbikák – Jesenice: 3–5 (1–1, 0–1, 2–3)

5th place

- Slavija(5) – Medveščak (6): 3–3 (1–1, 0–2, 2–0)
- Medveščak – Slavija: 3–4 n.P. (1–0, 0–3, 2–0, 0–1)

7th place

- Red Star (8) – Ferencvárosi (7): 5–0
- Ferencvárosi – Red Star: 0–5

== Final ranking ==
1. Olimpija
2. Alba Volán Székesfehérvár
3. Jesenice
4. Dunaújvárosi Acélbikák
5. Slavija
6. Medveščak
7. Ferencvárosi
8. Red Star
9. Bled
