= 2006–07 Interliga season =

The 2006–07 Interliga season was the eighth and final season of the multi-national ice hockey league. A total of 10 teams participated, five in Group A, and five in Group B. Alba Volan Szekesfehervar have won Group A and Jesenice have won Group B.

== Group A ==
=== Regular season ===
Place	Team	GP	Pts	W (OTW)	L (OTL)	GF–GA	GD
1	Alba Volán Székesfehérvár	16	34	12 (2)	4 (0)	53–34	+19
2	Olimpija	16	32	10 (1)	6 (3)	48–35	+13
3	Slavija	16	29	10 (2)	6 (1)	51–42	+9
4	Újpesti TE	16	13	5 (3)	11 (1)	38–58	–20
5	Medveščak	16	12	3 (0)	13 (3)	35–56	–21

=== Play-offs ===
==== Quarter-finals ====
Series	Standing	Game 1	Game 2	Game 3
Újpesti TE (4) – Medveščak (5)	2–0	4–2	4–2	

==== Semi-finals ====
Series	Standing	Game 1	Game 2	Game 3	Game 4	Game 5
Olimpija (2) – Slavija (3)	2–3	2–3	1–2	2–1 n.V.	3–1	1–2
Alba Volán Székesfehérvár (1) – Újpesti TE (4)	3–2	3–1	3–1	2–3	3–4 n.V.	7–2

==== Final ====
Series	Standing	Game 1	Game 2	Game 3
Alba Volán Székesfehérvár (1) – Slavija (3)	3–0	5–0	5–2	3–2

== Group B ==
=== Regular season ===
Place	Team	GP	Pts	W (OTW)	L (OTL)	GF–GA	GD
1	Jesenice 2	8	17	6 (2)	1 (1)	45–20	+25
2	Triglav Kranj	8	16	5 (0)	3 (1)	46–32	+14
3	Mladost	8	12	4 (0)	4 (0)	29–51	–22
4	Zagreb	8	8	3 (1)	5 (0)	34–42	–8
5	Alfa	8	7	2 (1)	6 (2)	24–33	–9

=== Play-offs ===
==== Quarter-finals ====
Series	Standing	Game 1	Game 2	Game 3
Zagreb (4) – Alfa (5)	0–2	2–5	0–3	

==== Semi-finals ====
Series	Standing	Game 1	Game 2	Game 3
Jesenice (1) – Alfa (5)	2–0	4–1	6–2	
Triglav Kranj (2) – Mladost (3)	2–1	5–4 n.P.	3–4 n.P.	6–3

==== Final ====
Series	Standing	Game 1	Game 2	Game 3
Jesenice (1) – Triglav (2)	2–0	3–1	7–2	
