= 1996–97 Slovenian Hockey League season =

The 1996–97 Slovenian Ice Hockey League season was the sixth season of the Slovenian Hockey League. Olimpija won the league championships.

== First round ==
=== Group A ===
Place	Team	Pts	GP	W	T	L	GF–GA	Diff
1	Olimpija	68	10	10	0	0	96–15	+81
2	Jesenice	52	10	9	0	1	106–20	+86
3	Bled	47	10	10	0	0	104–18	+86

=== Group B ===
Place	Team	Pts	GP	W	T	L	GF–GA	Diff
1	Triglav Kranj	44	28				189–78	+111
2	Slavija	34	28				130–78	+52
3	Maribor	21	28				75–172	–97
4	Kranjska Gora	14	28				93–166	–73
5	Celje	7	28				48–271	–223

== Final round ==
Place	Team	Pts	GP	W	T	L	GF–GA	Diff
1	Olimpija	12 (2)	6	5	0	1	29–10	+19
2	Jesenice	10 (1)	6	4	1	1	32–16	+16
3	Bled	5	6	2	1	3	27–33	–6
4	Triglav Kranj	0	6	0	0	6	13–42	–29

== Play-offs ==
=== Final ===
- Olimpija (1) – Jesenice (2): 4–0 (2–1 n.V., 4–2, 8–2, 5–1)

=== 3rd place ===
- Bled (3) – Triglav Kranj (4): 2–0 (7–4, 8–7)

=== 5th place ===
Place	Team	Pts	GP	W	T	L	GF–GA	Diff
1	Slavija	14 (3)	6				55–12	+43
2	Kranjska Gora	8 (1)	6				17–30	–13
3	Maribor	7 (2)	6				27–30	–3
4	Celje	1	6				16–43	–27
