= 1998–99 Slovenian Hockey League season =

Season of the Slovenian Hockey League

The 1998–99 Slovenian Ice Hockey League season was the eighth season of the Slovenian Hockey League. Olimpija defeated Slavija in the league final.

== Final ==
- 18 March 1999: Olimpija – Slavija : 5–1
- 20 March 1999: Slavija – Olimpija : 2–7 (0–3, 0–3, 2–1)
- 22 March 1999: Olimpija – Slavija : 7–2 (2–1, 5–0, 0–1)
