= 2000–01 Slovenian Hockey League season =

Slovenian ice hockey league season

The 2000–01 Slovenian Ice Hockey League season was the 10th season of the Slovenian Hockey League. Olimpija won the league championships.

== First round ==
Place	Team	Pts	GP	W	T	L	GF–GA	Diff
1	Olimpija	25	14	12	1	1	119–28	+91
2	Jesenice	25	14	12	1	1	114–22	+92
3	Slavija	20	14	10	0	4	99–37	+62
4	Kranjska Gora	17	14	8	1	5	67–72	–5
5	Triglav Kranj	11	14	5	1	8	51–69	–18
6	Bled	10	14	4	2	8	52–80	–28
7	March Interieri	3	14	1	1	12	19–104	–85
8	Maribor	1	14	0	1	13	24–133	–109

== Final round ==
Place	Team	Pts	GP	W	T	L	GF–GA	Diff
1	Jesenice	14 (3)	6	5	1	0	31–16	+15
2	Olimpija	13 (4)	6	4	1	1	31–12	+19
3	Slavija	6 (2)	6	2	0	4	22–28	–6
4	Kranjska Gora	1 (1)	6	0	0	6	15–43	–28

== Play-offs ==
=== Finals ===
- 13 March 2001: Jesenice – Olimpija : 1–3 (0–1, 1–1, 0–1)
- 15 March 2001: Olimpija – Jesenice: 4–1 (0–0, 1–1, 3–0)
- 17 March 2001: Jesenice – Olimpija : 5–3 (1–2, 2–1, 2–0)
- 20 March 2001: Olimpija – Jesenice: 6–3 (2–2, 2–0, 2–1)
- 21 March 2001: Jesenice – Olimpija : 2–4 (1–2, 1–1, 0–1)

=== 3rd place ===
- 13 March 2001: Slavija – Kranjska Gora: 10–5 (3–1, 3–2, 4–2)
- 15 March 2001: Kranjska Gora – Slavija : 5–8 (2–2, 2–1, 1–5)
- 17 March 2001: Slavija – Kranjska Gora: 2–0 (0–0, 1–0, 1–0)

=== 5th place ===
Place	Team	Pts	GP	W	T	L	GF–GA	Diff
1	Triglav Kranj	13 (4)	6	4	1	1	22–17	+5
2	Bled	12 (3)	6	4	1	1	38–17	+21
3	MARC Interieri	6 (2)	6	2	0	4	23–25	–2
4	Maribor	3 (1)	6	1	0	5	15–39	–24
