= 2001–02 Slovenian Hockey League season =

Slovenian ice hockey league season

The 2001–02 Slovenian Ice Hockey League season was the 11th season of the Slovenian Hockey League. Olimpija won the league championships.

== First round ==
Place	Team	Pts	GP	S	U	N	Tore	TVH
1	Olimpija	27	14	13	1	0	126–24	+102
2	Jesenice	24	14	11	2	1	131–22	+109
3	Slavija	17	13	8	1	4	90–45	+45
4	Bled	15	14	7	1	6	65–56	+9
5	Olimpija II	11	14	5	1	8	46–95	–49
6	Kranjska Gora	10	13	5	0	8	57–83	–26
7	Triglav Kranj	4	14	2	0	12	44–99	–55
8	Maribor	2	14	1	0	13	25–160	–135

== Final round ==
Place	Team	Pts	GP	S	U	N	Tore	TVH
1	Olimpija	14 (4)	6	5	0	1	29–13	+16
2	Jesenice	13(3)	6	5	0	1	23–9	+14
3	Bled	5 (1)	6	2	0	4	21–32	–11
4	Slavija	2 (2)	6	0	0	6	13–32	–19

== Play-offs ==
=== Final ===
- 22 March 2002, Olimpija – Jesenice: 1–2 n.V. (1–1, 0–0, 0–0, 0–1)
- 25 March 2002, Jesenice – Olimpija : 3–5 (1–1, 2–1, 0–3)
- 28 March 2002, Olimpija – Jesenice: 2–3 (0–1, 1–0, 1–2)
- 31 March 2002, Jesenice – Olimpija : 0–4 (0–2, 0–1, 0–1)
- 2 April 2002, Olimpija – Jesenice: 3–2 (0–1, 1–0, 2–1)
- 4 April 2002, Jesenice – Olimpija : 2–5 (0–1, 1–1, 1–3)

=== 3rd place ===
- 22 March 2002, Bled – Slavija : 4–3 n.P. (1–1, 1–0, 1–2, 0–0, 1–0)
- 25 March 2002, Slavija – Bled: 2–1 (1–0, 0–1, 1–0)
- 28 March 2002, Bled – Slavija : 4–3 n.V. (0–2, 3–0, 0–1, 1–0)
- 31 March 2002, Slavija – Bled: 5–4 (1–1, 3–2, 1–1)
- 2 April 2002, Bled – Slavija : 4–1 (1–1, 2–0, 1–0)

=== 5th place ===
Place	Team	Pts	GF–GA	S	U	N	Tore	TVH
1	Olimpija II	12 (4)	6	4	0	2	25–15	+10
2	Triglav Kranj	11 (2)	6	4	1	1	21–16	+5
3	Kranjska Gora	9 (3)	6	3	0	3	25–19	+6
4	Maribor	2 (1)	6	0	1	5	14–35	–21
