= 2001–02 Interliga season =

The 2001–02 Interliga season was the third season of the multi-national ice hockey league. Eight teams participated in the league, and Olimpija from Slovenia have won the championship.

== Regular season ==
Place	Team	GP	Pts	W (OTW)	L (OTL)	GF–GA	GD
1	Alba Volán Székesfehérvár	14	39	13 (1)	1 (1)	91–48	+43
2	Dunaújvárosi Acélbikák	14	28	10 (2)	4 (0)	67–32	+35
3	Olimpija	14	27	9 (1)	5 (1)	65–41	+24
4	Jesenice	14	27	8 (0)	6 (3)	63–44	+19
5	Dubnica	14	26	9 (2)	5 (1)	62–43	+19
6	Slavija	14	12	4 (0)	10 (0)	49–59	–10
7	Vojvodina	14	6	2 (0)	12 (0)	30–87	–57
8	Medveščak	14	3	1 (0)	13 (0)	38–108	–70

== Play-offs ==
=== Semi-finals ===
- Jesenice (4) – Alba Volán Székesfehérvár (1): 7–4 (1–0, 4–2, 2–2)
- Alba Volán Székesfehérvár – Jesenice: 6–1 (1–0, 2–0, 3–1)
- Olimpija (3) – Dunaújvárosi Acélbikák (2): 4–2 (1–0, 1–1, 2–1)
- Dunaújvárosi Acélbikák – Olimpija: 4–3 n.P. (1–1, 1–1, 2–0, 0–1)

=== Final ===
- Olimpija (3) – Alba Volán Székesfehérvár (1): 4–1 (1–0, 1–1, 2–0)
- Alba Volán Székesfehérvár – Olimpija: 5–3 n.P. (1–1, 3–0, 1–1, 0–1)

== Placing round ==
- Medveščak (8) – Dubnica: 5–7 (1–3, 2–3, 2–1)
- Dubnica – Medveščak: 10–4 (3–0, 4–2, 3–2)
- Vojvodina (7) – Slavija (6): 2–4 (1–2, 1–2, 0–0)
- Slavija – Vojvodina: 5–3 (2–1, 1–0, 2–2)

3rd place

- Jesenice – Dunaújvárosi Acélbikák: 2–0 (0–0, 1–0, 1–0)
- Dunaújvárosi Acélbikák – Jesenice: 4–4 (2–1, 0–1, 2–2)

5th place

- Slavija – Dubnica: 3–1 (2–1, 0–0, 1–0)
- Dubnica – Slavija : 5–0 (1–0, 3–0, 1–0)

7th place

- Medveščak – Vojvodina: 5–2 (2–0, 2–0, 1–2)
- Vojvodina – Medveščak: 6–1 (2–0, 1–1, 3–0)

== Final ranking ==
1. Olimpija
2. Alba Volán Székesfehérvár
3. Jesenice
4. Dunaújvárosi Acélbikák
5. Dubnica
6. Slavija
7. Vojvodina
8. Medveščak
