= 2003–04 Interliga season =

The 2003–04 Interliga season was the fifth season of the multi-national ice hockey league. Nine teams participated in the league, and Podhale Nowy Targ from Poland have won the championship.

== Regular season ==
Place	Team	GP	Pts	W (OTW)	L (OTL)	GF–GA	GD
1	Unia Oswiecim	16	39	13 (1)	3 (1)	65–41	+24
2	Alba Volán Székesfehérvár	16	31	10 (1)	6 (2)	54–39	+15
3	Podhale Nowy Targ	16	29	10 (1)	6 (0)	63–40	+23
4	Olimpija	16	25	8 (1)	8 (2)	41–37	+4
5	GKS Tychy	16	22	7 (0)	9 (1)	58–64	–6
6	Dunaújvárosi Acélbikák	16	19	6 (2)	10 (3)	45–58	–13
7	Medveščak	16	19	7 (3)	9 (1)	31–52	–21
8	Jesenice	16	18	6 (1)	10 (1)	41–43	–2
9	HK Slavija Ljubljana	16	14	5 (2)	11 (1)	39–63	–24

== Play-offs ==
=== Quarter-finals ===
Series	Standing	Game 1	Game 2	Game 3
Unia Oswiecim (1) – Jesenice (8)	1–2	3–6	3–0	1–2
Olimpija (4) – GKS Tychy (5)	2–0	3–2	4–3	
Alba Volán Székesfehérvár (2) – Medveščak (7)	2–0	5–4	2–1	
Podhale Nowy Targ (3) – Dunaújvárosi Acélbikák (6)	2–0	5–2	3–1	

=== Semi-finals ===
Series	Standing	Game 1	Game 2	Game 3
Alba Volán Székesfehérvár (2) – Podhale Nowy Targ (3)	1–2	1–2	4–3 n.P.	1–6
Olimpija (4) – Jesenice (8)	0–2	1–2 n.P.	3–4	

=== Final ===
Series	Standing	Game 1	Game 2	Game 3
Podhale Nowy Targ (3) – Jesenice (8)	2–0	6–0	4–1	
