= 2004–05 Interliga season =

The 2004–05 Interliga season was the sixth season of the multi-national ice hockey league. Six teams participated in the league, and Jesenice from Slovenia have won the championship.

== Regular season ==
Place	Team	GP	Pts	W (OTW)	L (OTL)	GF–GA	GD
1	Jesenice	20	59	20 (1)	0 (0)	97–25	+72
2	Alba Volán Székesfehérvár	20	30	10 (3)	10 (3)	57–54	+30
3	Dunaújvárosi Acélbikák	20	29	9 (1)	11 (3)	58–65	–7
4	Slavija	20	25	9 (3)	11 (1)	52–67	–15
5	Olimpija	20	25	10 (6)	10 (1)	53–71	–18
6	Medveščak	20	12	2 (0)	18 (7)	39–74	–35

== Play-offs ==
=== Quarter-finals ===
Series	Standing	Game 1	Game 2	Game 3
Dunaújvárosi Acélbikák (3) – Medveščak (6)	1–2	3–0	3–4 n.P.	2–3
Slavija (4) – Olimpija (5)	2–0	6–1	3–2	

=== Semi-finals ===
Series	Standing	Game 1	Game 2	Game 3
Jesenice (1) – Slavija (4)	3–0	8–2	3–2	6–0
Alba Volán Székesfehérvár (2) – Medveščak (6)	3–0	8–0	3–2 n.V.	2–1

=== Final ===
Series	Standing	Game 1	Game 2	Game 3
Jesenice (1) – Alba Volán Székesfehérvár (2)	3–0	4–2	3–0	5–2

== Final ranking ==
1. Jesenice
2. Alba Volán Székesfehérvár
3. Slavija
4. Medveščak
5. Dunaújvárosi Acélbikák
6. Olimpija
