= 2005–06 Interliga season =

The 2005–06 Interliga season was the seventh season of the multi-national ice hockey league. Seven teams participated in the league, and Jesenice from Slovenia have won the championship.

== Regular season ==
Place	Team	GP	Pts	W (OTW)	L (OTL)	GF–GA	GD
1	Jesenice	24	61	21 (2)	3 (0)	102–54	+48
2	Olimpija	24	47	15 (2)	9 (4)	81–46	+35
3	Alba Volán Székesfehérvár	24	44	14 (1)	10 (3)	78–58	+20
4	Slavija	24	38	13 (1)	10 (0)	89–69	+20
5	Újpesti TE	24	25	9 (2)	15 (0)	57–92	–35
6	Dunaújvárosi Acélbikák	24	23	8 (2)	15 (1)	57–71	–14
7	Medveščak	24	11	3 (0)	21 (2)	55–132	–77

== Play-offs ==
=== Quarter-finals ===
Series	Standing	Game 1	Game 2	Game 3
Olimpija (2) – Medveščak (7)	2–0	3–1	7–1	
Slavija (4) – Újpesti TE (5)	2–0	5–0 *	7–2	
Alba Volán Székesfehérvár (3) – Dunaújvárosi Acélbikák (6)	2–0	4–0	6–2	

=== Semi-finals ===
Series	Standing	Game 1	Game 2	Game 3
Jesenice (1) – Slavija (4)	2–1	2–3	8–1	4–2
Olimpija (2) – Alba Volán Székesfehérvár (3)	1–2	4–2	1–4	3–4

=== Final ===
Series	Standing	Game 1	Game 2	Game 3
Jesenice (1) – Alba Volán Székesfehérvár (3)	2–1	2–5	3–0	3–1

== Final ranking ==
1. Jesenice
2. Alba Volán Székesfehérvár
3. Olimpija
4. Slavija
5. Újpesti TE
6. Dunaújvárosi Acélbikák
7. Medveščak
