= 2002–03 Slovenian Hockey League season =

Slovenian ice hockey league season

The 2002–03 Slovenian Ice Hockey League season was the 12th season of the Slovenian Ice Hockey League. Olimpija won the league championships.

== First round ==
Place	Team	Pts	GP	W	T	L	GF–GA	Diff
1	Olimpija	24	14	12	0	2	109–32	+77
2	Slavija	24	14	12	0	2	73–23	+50
3	Jesenice	24	14	12	0	2	109–20	+89
4	Bled	13	14	6	1	7	55–50	+5
5	Maribor	9	14	4	1	9	37–95	–58
6	Kranjska Gora	8	14	3	2	9	39–103	–64
7	Triglav Kranj	5	14	2	1	11	32–81	–49
8	Olimpija II	5	14	1	3	10	27–77	–50

== Playoffs ==
=== Final round ===
Place	Team	Pts	GP	W	T	L	GF–GA	Diff
1	Olimpija	24 (4)	12	10	0	2	54–22	+32
2	Jesenice	18 (2)	12	8	0	4	43–29	+14
3	Slavija	10 (3)	12	3	1	8	27–45	–18
4	Bled	6 (1)	12	2	1	9	30–58	–28

=== Final ===
- 11 March 2003, Olimpija – Jesenice: 2–3 (1–1, 1–0, 0–2)
- 13 March 2003, Olimpija – Jesenice: 3–1 (0–0, 2–1, 1–0)
- 16 March 2003, Jesenice – Olimpija : 3–4 (0–2, 2–0, 1–2)
- 18 March 2003, Jesenice – Olimpija : 3–4 n.V. (1–1, 2–0, 0–2, 0–1)
- 20 March 2003, Olimpija – Jesenice: 7–2 (2–0, 3–2, 2–0)

=== 3rd place ===
- 22 March 2003, Slavija – Bled: 2–3 (1–0, 0–0, 1–3)
- 25 March 2003, Slavija – Bled: 9–1 (2–1, 6–0, 1–0)
- 28 March 2003, Bled – Slavija : 1–6 (1–2, 0–1, 0–3)
- 31 March 2003, Bled – Slavija : 1–6 (1–2, 0–3, 0–1)

=== 5th place ===
Place	Team	Pts	GP	W	T	L	GF–GA	Diff
1	Olimpija II	18 (1)	11	8	1	2	45–23	+22
2	Maribor	15 (4)	12	5	1	6	36–39	–3
3	Triglav Kranj	14 (2)	12	5	2	5	35–42	–7
4	Kranjska Gora	9 (3)	11	2	2	7	37–49	–12
