= Interliga (1999–2007) =

International professional ice hockey league

- Most recent season or competition: 2006–07 Interliga season
- Sport: ice hockey
- Founded: 1999
- Folded: 2007
- Replaced by: International Ice Hockey League
- Most titles: HDD Olimpija Ljubljana, Alba Volán Székesfehérvár, HK Acroni Jesenice (2)

The Interliga (English: International Ice Hockey League, German: Internationale Eishockeyliga) was an international professional ice hockey league which existed between 1999 and 2007. It was formed in 1999 to replace the Alpine League after Hungarian teams took over the Italian contingency and the base of the league shifted away from the Alps.

During its existence there were teams from Austria, Croatia, Hungary, Poland, Serbia, Slovakia and Slovenia.

== Results ==
Season	Winner
1999–2000	(Austria) EC Klagenfurt AC
2000–01	(Slovenia) Olimpija
2001–02	(Slovenia) Olimpija
2002–03	(Hungary) Alba Volán Székesfehérvár
2003–04	(Poland) Podhale Nowy Targ
2004–05	(Slovenia) Jesenice
2005–06	(Slovenia) Jesenice
2006–07	(Hungary) Alba Volán Székesfehérvár

== See also ==
- Alpenliga
- Slohokej League
