= 2005–06 Slovenian Hockey League season =

The 2005–06 Slovenian Ice Hockey League season was the 15th season of the Slovenian Hockey League. Ten teams participated in the league, and Jesenice won the league championships.

== First round ==
#	Club	GP	W	T	L	GF	GA	+/–	Pts
Group A
1	Jesenice	10	10	0	0	111	9	+104	20
2	HDD Olimpija	10	10	0	0	78	12	+66	20
3	Slavija	10	10	0	0	69	12	+57	20
Group B
4	Alfa	30	18	2	10	108	90	+18	38
5	Kranjska Gora	30	15	3	12	106	116	–10	33
6	Triglav Kranj	30	11	4	15	100	100	0	26
7	Mladost	24	8	6	10	79	80	–1	22
8	HK Olimpija	30	6	5	19	74	185	–111	17
9	Zagreb	24	7	2	15	83	138	–55	16
10	Maribor	30	6	4	20	84	152	–68	16

== Second round ==
#	Club	GP	W	T	L	GF	GA	+/–	Pts
Group A
1	Jesenice	12	9	1	2	65	25	+41	22 (3)
2	Slavija	12	6	3	3	49	34	+15	16 (1)
3	HDD Olimpija	12	6	1	5	43	29	+14	15 (2)
4	Alfa	12	0	1	11	13	83	–70	2 (1)
Group B
5	Kranjska Gora	6	6	0	0	29	11	+18	16 (4)
6	Maribor	6	3	0	3	22	18	+4	7 (1)
7	HK Olimpija	6	2	0	4	10	22	–12	6 (2)
8	Triglav Kranj	6	1	0	5	8	18	–10	5 (3)

== Play-offs ==
=== Final ===
- Jesenice – Slavija (2–3, 6–3, 3–2, 3–2, 7–0)

=== 3rd place ===
- Olimpija – Alfa (4–3, 9–1, 7–0)
