= 2003–04 Slovenian Hockey League season =

The 2003–04 Slovenian Ice Hockey League season was the 13th season of the Slovenian Ice Hockey League. Seven teams participated in the league, and Olimpija won the league championships.

== First round ==
#	Club	GP	W	T	L	GF	GA	+/–	Pts
Group A
1	Slavija	8	6	1	1	36	20	+16	13 (3)
2	Olimpija	8	6	0	2	41	15	+26	12 (2)
3	Jesenice	8	5	1	2	26	15	+11	11 (1)
Group B
4	Kranjska Gora	15	8	1	6	50	51	–1	17 (1)
5	Triglav Kranj	15	6	3	6	41	56	–15	15 (3)
6	Maribor	15	6	2	7	53	41	+12	14 (2)
7	Tivoli	15	0	2	13	32	81	–49	2 (1)

== Second round ==
#	Club	GP	W	T	L	GF	GA	+/–	Pts
1	Olimpija	6	4	1	1	28	17	+11	11 (2)
2	Slavija	6	2	3	1	18	15	+3	10 (3)
3	Jesenice	6	4	2	1	23	14	+9	9 (1)
4	Kranjska Gora	6	0	0	6	10	33	–23	1 (1)

== Play-offs ==
=== Final ===
- Olimpija – Slavija (1–0, 4–0, 4–1, 4–3)

=== 3rd place ===
- Jesenice – Kranjska Gora (2–3, 4–3, 6–2, 4–1)
