= 2004–05 Slovenian Hockey League season =

The 2004–05 Slovenian Ice Hockey League season was the 14th season of the Slovenian Hockey League.

== Regular season ==
#	Club	GP	W	T	L	GF	GA	+/–	Pts
Group A
1	Jesenice	12	10	2	0	71	21	+50	25 (3)
2	HDD Olimpija	12	5	4	3	32	23	+9	15 (1)
3	Slavija	12	3	3	6	35	38	–3	11 (2)
4	Kranjska Gora	12	1	1	10	22	78	–56	4 (1)
Group B
5	Triglav Kranj	6	5	0	1	36	13	+23	13 (3)
6	Maribor	7	4	0	3	36	32	–4	10 (2)
7	HK Olimpija	5	0	0	5	11	37	–26	1 (1)

== Play-offs ==
=== Final ===
- Jesenice — Olimpija (4–1, 3–0, 4–2, 1–2)

=== 3rd place ===
- Slavija – Kranjska Gora (5–0, 8–1, 9–2)
