= 2010 IIHF World Championship Division I =

Tournament details
- Host countries: Netherlands; Slovenia
- Venues: 2 (in 2 host cities)
- Dates: 19–25 April 2010 (A); 17–23 April 2010 (B)
- Teams: 12

The 2010 IIHF World Championship Division I was a pair of international ice hockey tournaments organized by the International Ice Hockey Federation. The tournaments were contested between 17 and 25 April 2010. Participants in this championship were drawn into two separate tournament groups. The Group A tournament was contested in Tilburg, Netherlands. Group B's games were played in Ljubljana, Slovenia. Austria won the Group A tournament while Slovenia won the Group B tournament to earn promotion to the Top Division of the 2011 IIHF World Championship. Serbia and Croatia finished last in each group and will be relegated to Division II at the 2011 World Championships. Spain and Estonia earned promotion from the 2010 IIHF World Championship Division II and replaced Serbia and Croatia in Division I in 2011.

== Group A ==
The Group A tournament was played in Tilburg, the Netherlands, from 19 to 25 April 2010.

=== Participating teams ===
Team	Qualification
Austria	Placed 14th in Top Division last year and were relegated
Ukraine	Placed 2nd in Division I Group B last year
Japan	Placed 3rd in Division I Group A last year
Lithuania	Placed 4th in Division I Group A last year
Netherlands	Hosts; placed 5th in Division I Group B last year
Serbia	Placed 1st in Division II Group A last year and were promoted

=== Final standings ===
Pos	Team	Pld	W	OTW	OTL	L	GF	GA	GD	Pts	Promotion or relegation
1	Austria	5	5	0	0	0	28	5	+23	15	Promoted to the 2011 Top Division
2	Ukraine	5	4	0	0	1	39	12	+27	12	
3	Japan	5	3	0	0	2	17	7	+10	9	
4	Netherlands (H)	5	1	1	0	3	11	19	−8	5	
5	Lithuania	5	1	0	0	4	19	33	−14	3	
6	Serbia	5	0	0	1	4	8	46	−38	1	Relegated to the 2011 Division II

Source: IIHF
(H) Host

=== Match results ===
All times are local.

19 April 2010; 13:30	Lithuania	5–12 (0–2, 4–4, 1–6)	Ukraine	IJssportcentrum Tilburg; Attendance: 500

Game reference

Arturas Kuzmicius
Goalies
Vadryn Seliverstov
Kostiantyn Simchuk
Referee:
(France) Jimmy Bergamelli

	0–1	3:35 – Materukhin (Shafarenko, Timchenko)
	0–2	14:17 – Mikhnov (Kasianchuk, Klymentiev)
	0–3	21:07 – Varlamov (Salnikov, Sriubko) (PP)
	0–4	22:00 – Timchenko (Materukhin, Pobiedonostsev)
22:25 – Kumeliauskas (Alisauskas, Verenis)	1–4
	1–5	23:59 – Salnikov (Varlamov, Navarenko)
25:34 – Kumeliauskas (Katulis) (PP2)	2–5
32:04 – Slikas (Katulis, Visockas)	3–5
35:10 – Kumeliauskas (Verenis, Kulevicius)	4–5
	4–6	36:35 – Kasianchuk (Mikhnov, Shakhraychuk)
	4–7	43:10 – Bondariev (Isayenko, Nimenko)
	4–8	44:27 – Shafarenko (Timchenko, Pobiedonostsev)
53:20 – Kulevicius (Kumeliauskas, Alisauskas)	5–8
	5–9	54:44 – Shakhraychuk (Mikhnov, Kasianchuk)
	5–10	57:10 – Kasianchuk
	5–11	58:48 – Tsyrul (Salnikov, Varlamov)
	5–12	59:46 – Materukhin (Shafarenko, Timchenko)

12 min
Penalties
10 min
35
Shots
43

19 April 2010; 17:00	Serbia	0–13 (0–7, 0–3, 0–3)	Austria	IJssportcentrum; Attendance: 800

Game reference

Milan Lukovic
Goalies
Reinhard Divis
Referee:
(Belgium) Swen Bergman

0–1	3:57 – Hager (Kaspitz, Harland) (PP)
0–2	6:28 – Unterluggauer (Koch, Welser)
0–3	9:14 – Setzinger (Koch, Welser)
0–4	13:16 – Tratting (Setzinger, Koch) (PP)
0–5	17:00 – Koch (Setzinger, Welser)
0–6	17:18 – Pock (Kaspitz, Unterluggauer)
0–7	19:33 – Harrand (Schuller)
0–8	25:18 – Schuller (SH)
0–9	35:03 – Werenka (Tratting, Welser)
0–10	39:13 – Welser (Tratting, Setzinger)
0–11	44:02 – Welser (Werenka, Setzinger)
0–12	53:42 – Welser (Harand, Unterluggauer)
0–13	59:46 – Welser (Werenka, Setzinger)

12 min
Penalties
20 min
17
Shots
51

19 April 2010; 20:30	Netherlands	1–3 (0–1, 0–2, 1–0)	Japan	IJssportcentrum; Attendance: 2500

Game reference

Phil Groeneveld
Goalies
Yutaka Fukufuji
Referee:
(Germany) Lars Brueggemann

	0–1	3:39 – Tanaka (Suzuki, Yamashita)
	0–2	25:14 – Suzuki (Kawashima, Domeki) (PP)
	0–3	39:29 – Domeki (Suzuki)
59:59 – Dalhuisen (Houkes, Willemse)	1–3

16 min
Penalties
8 min
30
Shots
47

20 April 2010; 13:30	Austria	6–2 (1–1, 3–0, 2–1)	Lithuania	IJssportcentrum; Attendance: 500

Game reference

Reinhard Divis
Goalies
Nerijus Dauksevicius
Arturas Kuzmicius
Referee:
(Denmark) Jacob Grumsen

	0–1	14:29 – Katulis (Kuliesius, Bauba) (PP)
18:10 – Trattnig (Werenka, Setzinger) (PP2)	1–1
28:16 – Latusa (Pewal, Lukas)	2–1
34:45 – Koch (Werenka, Tratting) (PP)	3–1
35:49 – Pock (Harand, Reichel)	4–1
43:01 – Peintner (Kirisits)	5–1
47:04 – Harand (Kaspitz, Hager)	6–1
	6–2	49:40 – Vaiciukevicius

28 min
Penalties
32 min
55
Shots
23

20 April 2010; 17:00	Japan	5–0 (1–0, 3–0, 1–0)	Serbia	IJssportcentrum; Attendance: 350

Game reference

Masahito Haruna
Goalies
Milan Lukovic
Zvezdan Vidakovic
Referee:
(Germany) Lars Brueggemann

0:53 – Ueno (Tonosaki) (PP)	1–0
29:37 – Iimura (Shigeno) (SH)	2–0
35:40 – Nishiwaki (Ueno, Iimura)	3–0
39:08 – Saito (Domeki) (SH)	4–0
46:02 – Sato (Shigeno, Keller)	5–0

18 min
Penalties
14 min
41
Shots
18

20 April 2010; 20:30	Ukraine	9–2 (3–0, 4–1, 2–1)	Netherlands	IJssportcentrum; Attendance: 2250

Game reference

Kostiantyn Simchuk
Goalies
Phil Groeneveld
Ian Meierdres
Referee:
(France) Jimmy Bergamelli

3:00 – Matvichuk (Blagoi)	1–0
14:40 – Kasianchuk (Mikhnov, Isayenko)	2–0
16:54 – Bondariev (Blagoi, Nimenko)	3–0
22:08 – Kasianchuk (Shakhraychuk, Mikhnov)	4–0
24:29 – Mikhnov (Kasianchuk)	5–0
28:37 – Shakhraychuk (Mikhnov, Kasianchuk)	6–0
	6–1	35:11 – van Biezen (Dalhuisen, Willemse) (PP2)
35:57 – Isayenko (Shafarenko, Materukhin) (SH)	7–1
49:56 – Bondariev (Ostroushko, Nimenko)	8–1
	8–2	52:46 – de Jong (Wurm, Kars)
54:19 – Nimenko (Isayenko)	9–2

24 min
Penalties
26 min
48
Shots
23

22 April 2010; 13:30	Ukraine	15–2 (1–1, 6–0, 8–1)	Serbia	IJssportcentrum; Attendance: 350

Game reference

Vadym Seliverstov
Goalies
Zvezdan Vidakovic
Milan Lukovic
Referee:
(Germany) Lars Brueggemann

	0–1	7:07 – Sretovic
13:03 – Sriubko (Tsyrul, Varlamov)	1–1
21:44 – Materukhin (Timchenko, Shafarenko)	2–1
23:39 – Tolkunov (Isayenko, Shakhraychuk) (PP)	3–1
23:58 – Materukhin (Timchenko, Shafarenko)	4–1
26:31 – Shakhraychuk (Kasianchuk, Mikhnov)	5–1
29:45 – Shakhraychuk (Mikhnov) (PP)	6–1
33:34 – Timchenko (Materukhin, Klymentiev)	7–1
42:18 – Matvichuk (Salnikov, Varlamov)	8–1
44:04 – Materukhin (Timchenko, Navarenko) (PP)	9–1
46:01 – Kasianchuk (Nimenko)	10–1
46:45 – Kasianchuk (Mikhnov, Isayenko)	11–1
49:33 – Navarenko (Tolkunov, Shakhraychuk) (PP)	12–1
	12–2	52:54 – Jankovic (Mamic)
55:52 – Varlamov (Salnikov, Matvichuk)	13–2
56:53 – Mikhnov (Kasianchuk, Ostroushko)	14–2
58:17 – Matvichuk	15–2

8 min
Penalties
18 min
50
Shots
20

22 April 2010; 17:00	Japan	1–3 (0–2, 1–0, 0–1)	Austria	IJssportcentrum; Attendance: 680

Game reference

Yutaka Fukufuji
Goalies
Reinhard Divis
Referee:
(Belgium) Sven Bergman

	0–1	5:00 – Koch (Setzinger, Trattnig) (PP)
	0–2	8:28 – Koch (Setzinger, Trattnig) (PP)
30:35 – Saito (PP)	1–2
	1–3	55:47 – Kaspitz (Harand, Trattnig) (SH)

18 min
Penalties
16 min
17
Shots
32

22 April 2010; 20:30	Lithuania	1–4 (1–1, 0–2, 0–1)	Netherlands	IJssportcentrum; Attendance: 2500

Game reference

Nerijus Dauskevicius
Goalies
Phil Groeneveld
Referee:
(Denmark) Jacob Grumsen

13:40 – Pliskauskas (Vysniauskas, Katulis) (PP)	1–0
	1–1	18:41 – van Biezen (van Sloun, Nazarov) (PP2)
	1–2	27:34 – van Sloun (van Biezen)
	1–3	31:18 – Teunissen (van Sloun, van Biezen) (PP)
	1–4	58:20 – Hagemeijer (EN)

36 min
Penalties
63 min
30
Shots
44

24 April 2010; 13:30	Ukraine	2–1 (0–0, 1–0, 1–1)	Japan	IJssportcentrum; Attendance: 650

Game reference

Konstiantyn Simchuk
Goalies
Yutaka Fukufuji
Referee:
(Belgium) Sven Bergman

32:24 – Tolkunov (Mikhnov, Kasianchuk) (PP2)	1–0
	1–1	57:31 – Suzuki (Saito, Yamshita)
58:35 – Materukhin (Timchenko, Shafarenko)	2–1

16 min
Penalties
12 min
36
Shots
17

24 April 2010; 17:00	Serbia	4–10 (0–3, 1–3, 3–4)	Lithuania	IJssportcentrum; Attendance: 900

Game reference

Milan Lukovic
Zvezdan Vidakovic
Goalies
Nerijus Dauksevicius
Arturas Kuzmicius
Referee:
(France) Jimmy Bergamelli

	0–1	5:36 – Aliukonis (Vaiciukevicius, Pliskauskas) (PP)
	0–2	17:05 – Katulis (Vaiciukevicius, Kumeliauskas)
	0–3	19:29 – Kumeliauskas (Verenis, Lelenas)
	0–4	27:09 – Pliskauskas (Vaiciukevicius, Lelenas)
	0–5	28:26 – Kumeliauskas (Verenis, Kulevicius)
	0–6	38:23 – Verenis (Kumeliauskas, Alisauskas) (PP)
39:25 – Jacob (Milovanovic, Fournier)	1–6
43:19 – Kosic (Prokic, Gabric)	2–6
44:13 – Vucurevic (Babic, Bibic)	3–6
45:15 – Sretovic (Gabric, Milovanovic)	4–6
	4–7	47:04 – Katulis (Pliskauskas, Kumeliauskas)
	4–8	56:16 – Bauba (Kumeliauskas, Kuliesius)
	4–9	59:08 – Alisauskas (Bauba, Kumeliauskas) (SH)
	4–10	59:57 – Vaiciukevicius (Kulevicius, Pliskauskas)

28 min
Penalties
22 min
27
Shots
53

24 April 2010; 20:30	Austria	4–1 (2–1, 2–0, 0–0)	Netherlands	IJssportcentrum; Attendance: 2500

Game reference

Reinhard Divis
Goalies
Ian Meierdres
Referee:
(Germany) Lars Brueggemann

0:33 – Werenka (Koch, Setzinger)	1–0
	1–1	6:40 – Bruinsma (Houkes, Willemse)
14:36 – Latusa (Pewal, Harand)	2–1
26:35 – Koch (PS)	3–1
27:33 – Reichel (Harand, Schuller)	4–1

24 min
Penalties
8 min
43
Shots
18

25 April 2010; 13:30	Japan	7–1 (2–0, 2–1, 3–0)	Lithuania	IJssportcentrum; Attendance: 1000

Game reference

Masahito Haruna
Goalies
Nerijus Dauksevicius
Arturas Kuzmicius
Referee:
(Belgium) Sven Bergman

14:45 – Tanaka (Suzuki, Keller) (PP2)	1–0
15:22 – Tonosaki (Osawa, Ueno) (PP)	2–0
	2–1	22:08 – Kieras (Verenis, Kumeliauskas)
24:04 – Kawashima (Suzuki, Tanaka) (PP)	3–1
36:21 – Suzuki (Kawai, Iimura)	4–1
42:18 – Ishioka (Tanaka, Sato)	5–1
45:11 – Kawai (Iimura, Suzuki)	6–1
59:20 – Ueno (Shigeno, Osawa)	7–1

16 min
Penalties
16 min
27
Shots
23

25 April 2010; 17:00	Netherlands	3–2 OT (2–1, 0–1, 0–0, 1–0)	Serbia	IJssportcentrum; Attendance: 2120

Game reference

Phil Groeneveld
Goalies
Milan Lukovic
Referee:
(France) Jimmy Bergamelli

4:38 – Kars (Houkes)	1–0
7:15 – van Schagen (Kars, Wurm)	2–0
	2–1	15:45 – Mirkovic (Sretovic, Milovanovic)
	2–2	35:14 – Mirkovic (Milovanovic, Sretovic) (PP)
62:57 – Kars (Dalhuisen)	3–2

20 min
Penalties
48 min
50
Shots
28

25 April 2010; 20:30	Austria	2–1 (1–0, 0–0, 1–1)	Ukraine	IJssportcentrum; Attendance: 1750

Game reference

Reinhard Divis
Goalies
Konstiantyn Simchuk
Referee:
(Germany) Lars Brueggemann

1:56 – Raffl (Kaspitz, Unterluggauer) (PP)	1–0
	1–1	50:06 – Sriubko (Tolkunov) (PP)
51:55 – Trattnig (Kaspitz, Raffl)	2–1

35 min
Penalties
76 min
22
Shots
28

=== Tournament awards ===
Best players selected by the directorate

- Best Goalkeeper: Yutaka Fukufuji Japan
- Best Forward: Kostiantyn Kasianchuk Ukraine
- Best Defenseman: Matthias Trattnig Austria

=== Scoring leaders ===
List shows the top skaters sorted by points, then goals.

Player	GP	G	A	Pts	+/−	PIM
(Ukraine) Kostiantyn Kasianchuk	5	6	7	13	+9	6
(Ukraine) Andri Mikhnov	5	3	9	12	+7	2
(Austria) Oliver Setzinger	5	1	9	10	+8	0
(Ukraine) Oleksandr Materukhin	5	6	3	9	+8	12
(Austria) Thomas Koch	5	5	4	9	+8	0
(Lithuania) Tadas Kumeliauskas	5	5	4	9	0	33
(Austria) Matthias Trattnig	5	3	6	9	+10	4
(Ukraine) Oleg Timchenko	5	2	7	9	+7	14
(Ukraine) Vadym Shakhraychuk	5	4	4	8	+9	6
(Austria) Daniel Welser	5	4	4	8	+9	2
(Japan) Takahito Suzuki	5	3	5	8	+3	4

GP = Games played; G = Goals; A = Assists; Pts = Points; +/− = Plus/minus; PIM = Penalties in minutes; POS = Position
Source: IIHF.com

=== Leading goalkeepers ===
Only the top five goalkeepers, based on save percentage, who have played 40% of their team's minutes are included in this list.

Player	TOI	SA	GA	GAA	Sv%	SO
(Japan) Masahito Haruna	120:00	41	1	0.50	97.56	1
(Austria) Reinhard Divis	300:00	103	5	1.00	95.15	1
(Japan) Yutaka Fukufuji	176:47	98	6	2.04	93.88	0
(Ukraine) Kostiantyn Simchuk	199:50	77	6	1.80	92.21	0
(Netherlands) Phil Groeneveld	211:34	134	12	3.40	91.04	0

TOI = Time on ice (minutes:seconds); SA = Shots against; GA = Goals against; GAA = Goals against average; Sv% = Save percentage; SO = Shutouts
Source: IIHF.com

== Group B ==
The Group A tournament was played in Ljubljana, Slovenia, from 17 to 23 April 2010.

=== Participating teams ===
Team	Qualification
Hungary	Placed 16th in Top Division last year and were relegated
Slovenia	Hosts; placed 2nd in Division I Group A last year
Great Britain	Placed 3rd in Division I Group B last year
Poland	Placed 4th in Division I Group B last year
Croatia	Placed 5th in Division I Group A last year
South Korea	Placed 1st in Division II Group B last year and were promoted

=== Final standings ===
Pos	Team	Pld	W	OTW	OTL	L	GF	GA	GD	Pts	Promotion or relegation
1	Slovenia (H)	5	4	1	0	0	29	10	+19	14	Promoted to the 2011 Top Division
2	Hungary	5	4	0	0	1	21	6	+15	12	
3	Poland	5	3	0	0	2	15	12	+3	9	
4	Great Britain	5	2	0	1	2	10	10	0	7	
5	South Korea	5	1	0	0	4	13	21	−8	3	
6	Croatia	5	0	0	0	5	4	33	−29	0	Relegated to the 2011 Division II

Source: IIHF
(H) Host

=== Match results ===
All times are local.

17 April 2010; 13:00	South Korea	2–4 (0–0, 1–3, 1–1)	Hungary	Tivoli Hall; Attendance: 510

Game reference

Hyun Seung Eum
Sung Je Park
Goalies
Zoltán Hetényi
Referee:
(Belarus) Vladimir Nalivaiko

20:36 – Kim KS (Song DH, Kim WJ)	1–0
	1–1	23:09 – Holéczy (Magosi, Kóger)
	1–2	28:51 – Vas (Kóger, Nagy)
	1–3	31:28 – Peterdi (Vas)
	1–4	41:36 – Kovács (Fekete) (SH)
49:32 – Kim KS (Cho MH, Kim WJ)	2–4

6 min
Penalties
12 min
23
Shots
27

17 April 2010; 16:30	Croatia	1–4 (1–1, 0–2, 0–1)	Great Britain	Tivoli Hall; Attendance: 530

Game reference

Vanja Belic
Goalies
Stephen Murphy
Referee:
(Slovenia) Viki Trilar

	0–1	4:48 – Phillips (Dowd)
12:45 – Kanaet (Rendulic, Glavota) (PP2)	1–1
	1–2	30:56 – O'Connor (Shields)
	1–3	37:07 – Chambers (Phillips)
	1–4	56:29 – Dowd (Hill, Tait) (PP)

16 min
Penalties
12 min
21
Shots
43

17 April 2010; 20:00	Poland	2–3 (1–3, 1–0, 0–0)	Slovenia	Tivoli Hall; Attendance: 3000

Game reference

Krzysztof Zborowski
Goalies
Andrej Hocevar
Referee:
(Czech Republic) Miroslav Jebavy

	0–1	2:56 – Kovacevic (Sivic)
13:44 – Csorich (Drzewiecki) (PP)	1–1
	1–2	14:17 – Razingar (Sivic, Hebar)
	1–3	19:49 – Urbas (Kuznik, Jeglic) (PP)
24:03 – Klys (Malasinski, Proszkiewicz)(PP)	2–3

10 min
Penalties
12 min
34
Shots
34

18 April 2010; 13:00	Great Britain	2–1 (0–0, 1–1, 1–0)	South Korea	Tivoli Hall; Attendance: 520

Game reference

Stevie Lyle
Goalies
Sung Je Park
Referee:
(Czech Republic) Miroslav Jebavy

26:46 – Hill (Weaver, O'Connor) (PP)	1–0
	1–1	37:21 – Song DH (Kim KS)
49:41 – Hewitt (Tait)	2–1

14 min
Penalties
10 min
25
Shots
29

18 April 2010; 16:30	Hungary	6–0 (2–0, 0–0, 4–0)	Poland	Tivoli Hall; Attendance: 640

Game reference

Zoltán Hetényi
Goalies
Krzysztof Zborowski
Kamil Kosowski
Referee:
(Slovenia) Viki Trilar

8:38 – Sofron	1–0
10:17 – Vas (Ladányi, Tokaji) (PP)	2–0
40:14 – Vas (Ladányi, Horváth)	3–0
45:14 – Sille (Holéczy, Sofron)	4–0
45:43 – Horváth (Ladányi, Vas)	5–0
57:22 – Ladányi (Sille)	6–0

4 min
Penalties
4 min
31
Shots
29

18 April 2010; 20:00	Slovenia	10–1 (6–0, 1–1, 3–0)	Croatia	Tivoli Hall; Attendance: 3500

Game reference

Andrej Hocevar
Ales Sila
Goalies
Vanja Belic
Referee:
(Belarus) Vladimir Nalivaiko

1:04 – Kovacevic (Razingar, Sivic)	1–0
5:28 – Mursak (M. Rodman) (SH)	2–0
9:07 – Razingar (Hebar, Kovacevic)	3–0
9:21 – Pance (Golicic)	4–0
11:20 – Jeglic (Urbas, Ticar)	5–0
14:17 – Pavlin (Ticar, Urbas) (PP)	6–0
	6–1	23:58 – Novak (Kucera, Glavota) (PP)
35:39 – M. Rodman (Mursak, D. Rodman)	7–1
50:30 – Mursak (M. Rodman, D. Rodman) (PP)	8–1
50:47 – Ticar (Jeglic)	9–1
59:57 – Ticar (Jeglic, Urbas)	10–1

12 min
Penalties
16 min
49
Shots
18

20 April 2010; 13:00	South Korea	2–5 (1–3, 1–1, 0–1)	Poland	Tivoli Hall; Attendance: 362

Game reference

Sung Je Park
Goalies
Krzysztof Zborowski
Referee:
(Slovenia) Viki Trilar

	0–1	3:50 – Laszkiewicz (Drzewiecki, Dziubinski)
	0–2	7:01 – Kotlorz (Laszkiewicz)
7:33 – Song DH (Kim KS)	1–2
	1–3	19:53 – Dziubinski (Malasinski, Kotlorz)
33:30 – Cho MH (Kim WJ, Kim KS) (PP)	2–3
	2–4	36:38 – Rzeszutko (Rozanski)
	2–5	55:05 – Wajda (Dziubinski) (PP)

10 min
Penalties
8 min
37
Shots
21

20 April 2010; 16:30	Hungary	8–0 (3–0, 5–0, 0–0)	Croatia	Tivoli Hall; Attendance: 623

Game reference

Zoltán Hetényi
Miklós Rajna
Goalies
Matija Tackovic
Referee:
(Belarus) Vladimir Nalivaiko

3:27 – Vas (Tokaji, Ladányi)	1–0
3:53 – Fekete (Palkovics, Kovács)	2–0
15:56 – Peterdi (Horváth, Kóger) (PP)	3–0
24:39 – Peterdi (Kóger, G. Nagy) (PP)	4–0
26:38 – Ladányi (Vas) (PP)	5–0
29:41 – Svasznek	6–0
32:10 – Peterdi (Szirányi, G. Nagy)	7–0
32:57 – Magosi (Sofron, Holéczy)	8–0

6 min
Penalties
10 min
44
Shots
18

20 April 2010; 20:00	Slovenia	4–3 OT (1–0, 1–0, 1–3, 1–0)	Great Britain	Tivoli Hall; Attendance: 3600

Game reference

Andrej Hocevar
Goalies
Stephen Murphy
Referee:
(Czech Republic) Miroslav Jebavy

18:33 – Urbas (Jeglic, Ticar) (PP)	1–0
29:14 – Ticar (Milovanovic, Jeglic)	2–0
	2–1	45:20 – Tait (Chambers) (PP)
	2–2	45:42 – Garside
51:02 – Ticar (Jeglic, Urbas)	3–2
	3–3	59:08 – Phillips (Clarke, Tait)
61:40 – Jeglic (Music)	4–3

16 min
Penalties
22 min
35
Shots
20

21 April 2010; 13:00	Poland	6–0 (3–0, 2–0, 1–0)	Croatia	Tivoli Hall; Attendance: 356

Game reference

Krzysztof Zborowski
Goalies
Vanja Belic
Referee:
(Czech Republic) Miroslav Jebavy

3:00 – Rzeszutko (Baginski, Csorich)	1–0
3:57 – Danieluk (Lopuski, Sarnik)	2–0
13:03 – Lopuski (Danieluk, Sarnik)	3–0
31:49 – Pasiut (Laszkiewicz, Drzewiecki) (PP)	4–0
39:14 – Malasinski (Rompkowski) (SH)	5–0
59:16 – Dutka (Rompkowski, Kolusz) (PP)	6–0

4 min
Penalties
42 min
64
Shots
11

21 April 2010; 16:30	Great Britain	0–2 (0–0, 0–1, 0–1)	Hungary	Tivoli Hall; Attendance: 1500

Game reference
Stephen Murphy	Goalies	Zoltan Hetenyi	Referee: (Slovenia) Viki Trilar
0–1 / 30:24 – Fekete (Palkovics, Ennaffati); 0–2 / 45:43 – Palkovics (Kovacs)			Referee: (Slovenia) Viki Trilar
37 min	Penalties	8 min	Referee: (Slovenia) Viki Trilar
35	Shots	34	Referee: (Slovenia) Viki Trilar

21 April 2010; 20:00	Slovenia	8–3 (3–0, 2–2, 3–1)	South Korea	Tivoli Hall; Attendance: 2800

Game reference

Andrej Hocevar
Goalies
Sung Je Park
Referee:
(Belarus) Vladimir Nalivaiko

4:58 – Mursak (M. Rodman)	1–0
6:56 – Kranjc (Sivic)	2–0
12:16 – Ticar (Urbas, Jeglic) (PP)	3–0
	3–1	20:22 – Kim WJ (Song DH, Kim KS)
25:04 – Pretnar (Pance)	4–1
32:36 – Sivic (Hebar, Tavzelj)	5–1
	5–2	34:57 – Park WS (Song DH)
40:33 – D. Rodman (M. Rodman, Mursak)	6–2
46:47 – Mursak (M. Rodman, D. Rodman)	7–2
54:12 – Razingar (Hebar, Sivic)	8–2
	8–3	55:09 – Ahn (Kim WJ, Kim HS)

14 min
Penalties
16 min
34
Shots
28

23 April 2010; 13:00	Croatia	2–5 (1–3, 0–1, 1–1)	South Korea	Tivoli Hall; Attendance: 350

Game reference

Vanja Belic
Goalies
Sung Je Park
Referee:
(Slovenia) Viki Trilar

	0–1	0:41 – Song DH
	0–2	8:01 – Song DH (Kim HS, Kim DH) (PP)
9:15 – Lovrencic (Smerdelj)	1–2
	1–3	11:05 – Park WS (Kim WJ, Kim KS)
	1–4	22:49 – Kim KS (Park WS)
	1–5	57:26 – Kim WJ (Kim DH, Lee YJ)
58:57 – Kanaet (Blagus)	2–5

4 min
Penalties
2 min
29
Shots
33

23 April 2010; 16:30	Great Britain	1–2 (1–0, 0–1, 0–1)	Poland	Tivoli Hall; Attendance: 350

Game reference

Stephen Murphy
Goalies
Krzysztof Zborowski
Referee:
(Czech Republic) Miroslav Jebavy

17:13 – Hill (Cowley, Richardson)	1–0
	1–1	37:57 – Rzeszutko (Kotlorz)
	1–2	53:43 – Lopuski (Dziubinski)

8 min
Penalties
8 min
20
Shots
43

23 April 2010; 20:00	Hungary	1–4 (1–1, 0–1, 0–2)	Slovenia	Tivoli Hall; Attendance: 4500

Game reference

Zoltan Hetenyi
Goalies
Andrej Hocevar
Referee:
(Belarus) Vladimir Nalivaiko

	0–1	0:50 – Ticar (Pange, Jeglic)
8:37 – Vas (Sille) (SH)	1–1
	1–2	37:42 – Kranjc (Kovacevic) (PP)
	1–3	41:06 – Ticar (Jeglic, Pavlin)
	1–4	53:30 – Mursak (Kranjc)

36 min
Penalties
8 min
15
Shots
36

=== Tournament awards ===
Best players selected by the directorate

- Best Goalkeeper: Stephen Murphy Great Britain
- Best Forward: Žiga Jeglič Slovenia
- Best Defenseman: András Horváth Hungary

=== Scoring leaders ===
List shows the top skaters sorted by points, then goals.

Player	GP	G	A	Pts	+/−	PIM
(Slovenia) Žiga Jeglič	5	2	9	11	+5	0
(Slovenia) Rok Tičar	5	7	3	10	+4	2
(South Korea) Kim Ki-sung	5	3	5	8	+3	2
(Slovenia) Jan Muršak	5	5	2	7	+4	2
(South Korea) Song Dong-hwan	5	4	3	7	+5	2
(Slovenia) Jan Urbas	5	2	5	7	+5	6
(Hungary) Balázs Ladányi	5	2	4	6	+2	0
(Slovenia) Marcel Rodman	5	1	5	6	+4	6
(Slovenia) Mitja Šivic	5	1	5	6	+7	6
(Hungary) Márton Vas	5	4	1	5	+3	0
(South Korea) Kim Woo-jae	5	1	4	5	+2	4

GP = Games played; G = Goals; A = Assists; Pts = Points; +/− = Plus/minus; PIM = Penalties in minutes; POS = Position
Source: IIHF.com

=== Leading goalkeepers ===
Only the top five goalkeepers, based on save percentage, who have played 40% of their team's minutes are included in this list.

Player	TOI	SA	GA	GAA	Sv%	SO
(Hungary) Zoltán Hetényi	280:00	131	6	1.29	95.52	2
(United Kingdom) Stephen Murphy	240:20	133	9	2.25	93.23	0
(Poland) Krzyszstof Zborowski	279:54	122	9	1.93	92.62	1
(Slovenia) Andrej Hočevar	291:03	110	10	2.06	90.91	0
(Croatia) Vanja Belić	300:00	223	33	6.60	85.20	0

TOI = Time on ice (minutes:seconds); SA = Shots against; GA = Goals against; GAA = Goals against average; Sv% = Save percentage; SO = Shutouts
Source: IIHF.com

== IIHF Broadcasting rights ==
Country	Broadcaster
Austria	ORF Sport Plus
Hungary	Sport 1
Poland	Polsat Sport
Serbia	Arena Sport
Slovenia	RTV Slovenia
Ukraine	Sport 1
