= HKMK Bled =

Slovenian ice hockey club

- City: Bled, Slovenia
- Founded: 8 July 1999; 26 years ago
- Operated: 1999–present
- Home arena: Bled Ice Hall
- Colours: Blue, white
- Head coach: Tadej Burazin
- Website: hkmkbled.com

Hokejski klub mlade kategorije Bled, commonly referred to as HKMK Bled or simply Bled, is an ice hockey club from Bled, Slovenia. The club was founded in 1999. As of 2022–23, they compete only with youth selections.
