= HK Triglav Kranj =

Slovenian ice hockey club

- City: Kranj, Slovenia
- League: International Hockey League; Slovenian Championship
- Founded: 1968; 58 years ago
- Operated: 1968–present
- Home arena: Zlato Polje Ice Hall
- Colours: Blue, white
- Head coach: Gorazd Rekelj
- Website: hktriglav.si

Hokejski klub Triglav Kranj (English: Triglav Kranj Hockey Club), commonly referred to as HK Triglav or simply Triglav, is an ice hockey club from Kranj, Slovenia. The club was founded in 1968.

== Honours ==
- Slovenian Championship

Runners-up: 2021–22

- International Hockey League

Winners: 2020–21, 2021–22, 2023–24, 2025–26
Runners-up: 2022–23
