= HK Slavija =

- City: Ljubljana, Slovenia
- Founded: 1964; 62 years ago
- Operated: 1964–2018
- Dissolved: 2018; 8 years ago
- Home arena: Zalog Ice Hall
- Colours: Black, orange, white, yellow

Hokejski klub Slavija (English: Slavija Hockey Club), commonly referred to as HK Slavija or simply Slavija, was an ice hockey club from Ljubljana, Slovenia. Slavija was founded in 1964 and folded in 2018 due to financial problems. The team played their home matches at the Zalog Ice Hall, a 1,000 capacity ice hall in Ljubljana.

== Honours ==
- Slovenian Championship

Runners-up (5): 1998–99, 2003–04, 2005–06, 2006–07, 2012–13

- Inter-National League

Runners-up: 2012–13
