= Klemen Pretnar =

Slovenian ice hockey player (born 1986)

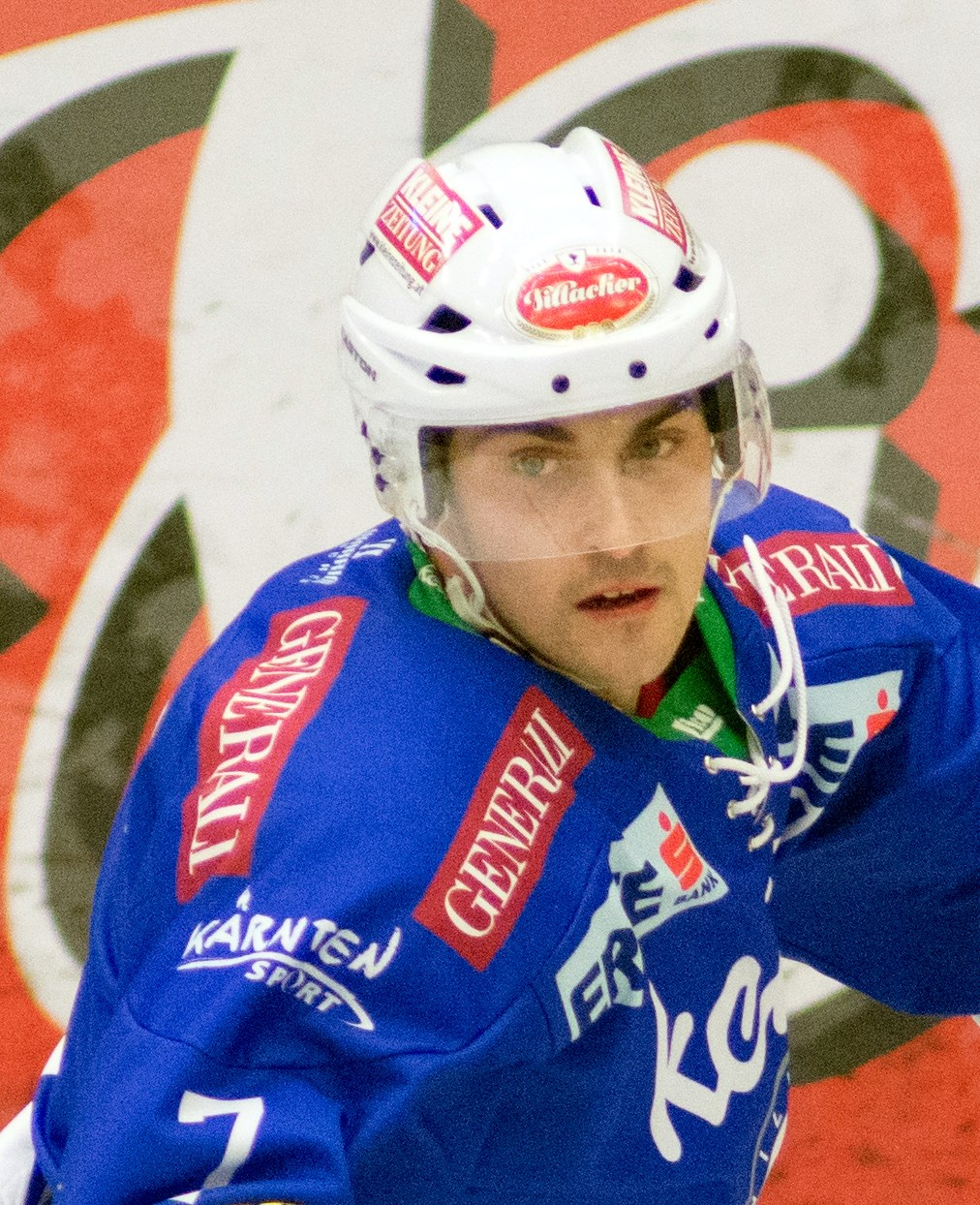
- Born: August 31, 1986 (age 39) Bled, Yugoslavia
- Height: 5 ft 11 in (180 cm)
- Weight: 181 lb (82 kg; 12 st 13 lb)
- Position: Defence
- Shoots: Right
- Oberliga team Former teams: Tölzer Löwen; HK MK Bled; HK Triglav Kranj; HK Acroni Jesenice; EC VSV; Vienna Capitals; Yunost Minsk; HC '05 Banská Bystrica; HC Košice
- National team: Slovenia
- NHL draft: Undrafted
- Playing career: 2009–present

Klemen Pretnar (born August 31, 1986) is a Slovenian professional ice hockey defenceman who plays for Tölzer Löwen. He previously played for HC Košice of the Slovak Extraliga.

In 2012, Pretner signed with EC VSV of the Austrian Hockey League. On April 15, 2015, Pretnar signed a one-year contract with fellow Austrian club, the Vienna Capitals.

He participated at the 2011 IIHF World Championship as a member of the Slovenia men's national ice hockey team.

== Career statistics ==
=== Regular season and playoffs ===
			Regular season					Playoffs
Season	Team	League	GP	G	A	Pts	PIM	GP	G	A	Pts	PIM
2002–03	HKMK Bled	SVN U20	18	4	8	12	12	—	—	—	—	—
2002–03	HKMK Bled	IEHL	11	0	0	0	4	—	—	—	—	—
2002–03	HKMK Bled	SVN	18	1	0	1	2	4	0	0	0	0
2003–04	HKMK Bled	SVN U20	19	4	7	11	47	—	—	—	—	—
2003–04	HK Triglav Kranj	SVN	2	0	0	0	0	—	—	—	—	—
2004–05	HK Triglav Kranj	SVN U20	21	6	7	13	30	—	—	—	—	—
2004–05	HK Triglav Kranj	SVN	22	2	4	6	0	—	—	—	—	—
2005–06	HK Triglav Kranj	SVN	33	8	14	22	30	—	—	—	—	—
2006–07	HK Triglav Kranj	SVN	7	1	7	8	8	—	—	—	—	—
2007–08	HK Triglav Kranj	SVN	26	5	12	17	60	2	0	1	1	0
2008–09	HK Triglav Kranj	SVN	3	0	0	0	0	—	—	—	—	—
2008–09	HD Mladi Jesenice	SVN	14	6	9	15	4	2	0	0	0	4
2009–10	HK Acroni Jesenice	AUT	51	1	3	4	20	—	—	—	—	—
2009–10	HK Acroni Jesenice	SVN	4	0	1	1	2	6	0	0	0	4
2010–11	HK Acroni Jesenice	AUT	41	4	11	15	36	—	—	—	—	—
2010–11	HK Acroni Jesenice	SVN	4	0	5	5	0	4	0	1	1	0
2011–12	HK Acroni Jesenice	AUT	38	2	12	14	26	—	—	—	—	—
2011–12	HK Acroni Jesenice	SVN	—	—	—	—	—	6	0	5	5	2
2012–13	EC VSV	AUT	49	4	22	26	22	7	0	2	2	6
2013–14	EC VSV	AUT	48	6	22	28	34	3	0	1	1	0
2014–15	EC VSV	AUT	47	5	10	15	28	5	0	1	1	2
2015–16	Vienna Capitals	AUT	19	0	3	3	12	—	—	—	—	—
2016–17	Yunost Minsk	BLR	38	7	21	28	24	13	3	9	12	4
2017–18	Yunost Minsk	BLR	22	2	9	11	40	—	—	—	—	—
2017–18	HC ’05 iClinic Banská Bystrica	SVK	10	0	2	2	2	16	3	4	7	2
2018–19	HC Košice	SVK	40	1	14	15	20	1	0	0	0	4
2019–20	TH Unia Oświęcim	POL	44	11	11	22	20	5	2	3	5	0
2020–21	TH Unia Oświęcim	POL	28	4	7	11	24	6	0	1	1	2
2021–22	Gothiques d'Amiens	FRA	38	5	19	24	26	6	0	5	5	2
SVN totals			133	23	52	75	106	24	0	7	7	10
AUT totals			293	22	83	105	178	15	0	4	4	8

=== International ===
Year	Team	Event	GP	G	A	Pts	PIM
2004	Slovenia	WJC18 D1	5	0	0	0	2
2005	Slovenia	WJC D1	5	0	0	0	0
2006	Slovenia	WJC D1	5	1	0	1	8
2010	Slovenia	WC D1	5	1	0	1	0
2011	Slovenia	WC	3	0	0	0	0
2013	Slovenia	OGQ	3	0	1	1	2
2013	Slovenia	WC	7	0	1	1	0
2014	Slovenia	OG	5	0	0	0	2
2015	Slovenia	WC	7	0	2	2	4
2016	Slovenia	WC D1A	5	1	2	3	0
2017	Slovenia	WC	6	0	4	4	0
2019	Slovenia	WC D1A	5	0	0	0	2
2020	Slovenia	OGQ	3	0	4	4	2
2021	Slovenia	OGQ	3	0	2	2	0
2022	Slovenia	WC D1A	4	0	2	2	0
Junior totals			15	1	0	1	10
Senior totals			56	2	18	20	12
