= Andrej Hebar =

Slovenian ice hockey player (born 1984)

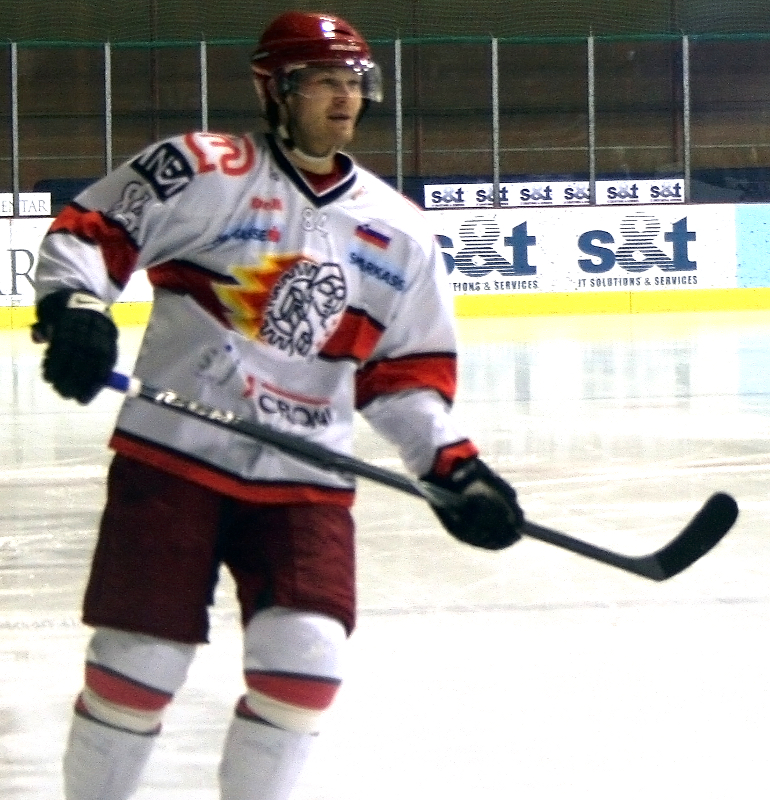
- Born: 7 September 1984 (age 40); Ljubljana, SFR Yugoslavia
- Height: 5 ft 10 in (178 cm)
- Weight: 185 lb (84 kg; 13 st 3 lb)
- Position: Forward
- Shot: Left
- Erste Liga team Former teams: Újpesti TE; HC Havířov; HDD Olimpija Ljubljana; HC Oceláři Třinec; HK Slavija; HK Acroni Jesenice; Colorado Eagles; IF Troja/Ljungby; KHL Medveščak Zagreb; HKm Zvolen; Brûleurs de Loups; HK Olimpija
- National team: Slovenia
- NHL draft: Undrafted
- Playing career: 2002–2021

Andrej Hebar (born 7 September 1984) is a Slovenian professional ice hockey forward who currently plays for Újpesti TE in the Erste Liga. He participated at the 2011 IIHF World Championship as a member of the Slovenia men's national ice hockey team.

== Career statistics ==
=== Regular season and playoffs ===
			Regular season					Playoffs
Season	Team	League	GP	G	A	Pts	PIM	GP	G	A	Pts	PIM
2000–01	Västra Frölunda HC	J18 Allsv	8	6	2	8	8	3	0	1	1	12
2000–01	Västra Frölunda HC	J20	4	0	0	0	2	—	—	—	—	—
2001–02	Västra Frölunda HC	J18 Allsv	6	2	5	7	6	—	—	—	—	—
2001–02	Västra Frölunda HC	J20	28	5	4	9	16	—	—	—	—	—
2002–03	HC Havířov Panthers	CZE U20	28	5	4	9	16	—	—	—	—	—
2002–03	HC Havířov Panthers	ELH	23	1	1	2	20	—	—	—	—	—
2002–03	HDD Olimpija Ljubljana	SVN U20	—	—	—	—	—	1	0	0	0	0
2002–03	HDD Olimpija Ljubljana	SVN	—	—	—	—	—	4	0	0	0	0
2003–04	HC Oceláři Třinec	CZE U20	31	16	8	24	103	—	—	—	—	—
2003–04	HC Oceláři Třinec	ELH	12	0	0	0	2	—	—	—	—	—
2003–04	HC Havířov Panthers	CZE.2	15	0	4	4	17	—	—	—	—	—
2004–05	HC Oceláři Třinec	CZE U20	2	1	1	2	0	—	—	—	—	—
2004–05	HC Oceláři Třinec	ELH	14	1	1	2	4	—	—	—	—	—
2004–05	HC Slezan Opava	CZE.2	18	7	4	11	73	—	—	—	—	—
2004–05	HC Olomouc	CZE.2	23	5	5	10	41	—	—	—	—	—
2004–05	HDD Olimpija Ljubljana	SVN	13	2	2	4	10	—	—	—	—	—
2005–06	HC Olomouc	CZE.2	25	2	0	2	10	—	—	—	—	—
2005–06	HK Slavija	SVN	18	9	3	12	16	—	—	—	—	—
2006–07	HC Oceláři Třinec	ELH	1	0	0	0	2	—	—	—	—	—
2006–07	HDD Olimpija Ljubljana	IEHL	20	5	7	12	32	—	—	—	—	—
2006–07	HDD Olimpija Ljubljana	SVN	22	13	10	23	34	5	2	2	4	8
2007–08	HK Acroni Jesenice	AUT	45	4	3	7	32	5	0	1	1	4
2007–08	HK Acroni Jesenice	SVN	—	—	—	—	—	8	3	4	7	29
2008–09	HK Acroni Jesenice	AUT	40	14	18	32	38	5	0	2	2	10
2008–09	HK Acroni Jesenice	SVN	—	—	—	—	—	6	3	2	5	20
2009–10	HK Acroni Jesenice	AUT	40	15	16	31	94	—	—	—	—	—
2009–10	HK Acroni Jesenice	SVN	4	0	2	2	6	6	4	3	7	42
2010–11	HDD Olimpija Ljubljana	AUT	20	11	9	20	92	—	—	—	—	—
2010–11	HDD Olimpija Ljubljana	SVN	3	1	4	5	4	4	0	2	2	4
2010–11	Colorado Eagles	CHL	10	3	3	6	4	—	—	—	—	—
2011–12	HDD Olimpija Ljubljana	AUT	6	0	1	1	14	—	—	—	—	—
2011–12	IF Troja/Ljungby	Allsv	32	5	7	12	10	—	—	—	—	—
2012–13	KHL Medveščak Zagreb	AUT	6	0	0	0	4	—	—	—	—	—
2012–13	HDD Olimpija Ljubljana	AUT	25	7	7	14	44	—	—	—	—	—
2012–13	HDD Olimpija Ljubljana	SVN	—	—	—	—	—	4	0	5	5	0
2013–14	HDD Olimpija Ljubljana	AUT	48	12	12	24	26	—	—	—	—	—
2013–14	HKm Zvolen	SVK	5	3	2	5	6	4	0	0	0	35
2014–15	HKm Zvolen	SVK	9	2	3	5	6	—	—	—	—	—
2014–15	HDD Olimpija Ljubljana	AUT	40	3	4	7	19	—	—	—	—	—
2014–15	HDD Olimpija Ljubljana	SVN	1	0	0	0	0	4	1	0	1	4
2015–16	HDD Olimpija Ljubljana	AUT	28	10	7	17	18	—	—	—	—	—
2015–16	Brûleurs de Loups	FRA	14	2	8	10	10	2	0	0	0	0
2016–17	Újpesti TE	MOL	39	23	22	45	110	12	5	2	7	43
2017–18	HK Olimpija	AlpsHL	40	22	26	48	47	4	2	2	4	16
2017–18	HK Olimpija	SVN	9	10	9	19	41	7	3	7	10	12
2018–19	Újpesti TE	EL	46	22	19	41	63	10	2	3	5	8
2019–20	HDD Jesenice	AlpsHL	44	15	25	40	49	—	—	—	—	—
2019–20	HDD Jesenice	SVN	8	10	4	14	4	2	0	0	0	2
2020–21	HDD Jesenice	AlpsHL	34	10	18	28	17	8	1	4	5	4
2020–21	HDD Jesenice	SVN	10	2	9	11	6	7	1	4	5	4
SVN totals			88	47	43	90	121	57	17	29	46	125
AUT totals			298	76	77	153	381	10	0	3	3	14

=== International ===
Year	Team	Event	GP	G	A	Pts	PIM
2001	Slovenia	WJC18 D2	4	4	4	8	2
2002	Slovenia	WJC D1	5	0	0	0	10
2002	Slovenia	WJC18 D1	5	2	5	7	8
2003	Slovenia	WJC D1	5	2	4	6	37
2004	Slovenia	WJC D1	5	2	2	4	4
2006	Slovenia	WC	6	0	0	0	2
2008	Slovenia	WC	5	0	0	0	6
2009	Slovenia	OGQ	3	1	2	3	4
2009	Slovenia	WC D1	5	3	1	4	8
2010	Slovenia	WC D1	5	0	4	4	2
2011	Slovenia	WC	6	1	0	1	4
2012	Slovenia	WC D1A	5	1	0	1	4
2016	Slovenia	WC D1A	5	0	1	1	6
2018	Slovenia	OG	2	0	0	0	2
2018	Slovenia	WC D1A	5	0	0	0	0
2019	Slovenia	WC D1A	5	1	1	2	0
Junior totals			24	10	15	25	61
Senior totals			52	7	9	16	38
