= Ken Ograjenšek =

Slovenian ice hockey player

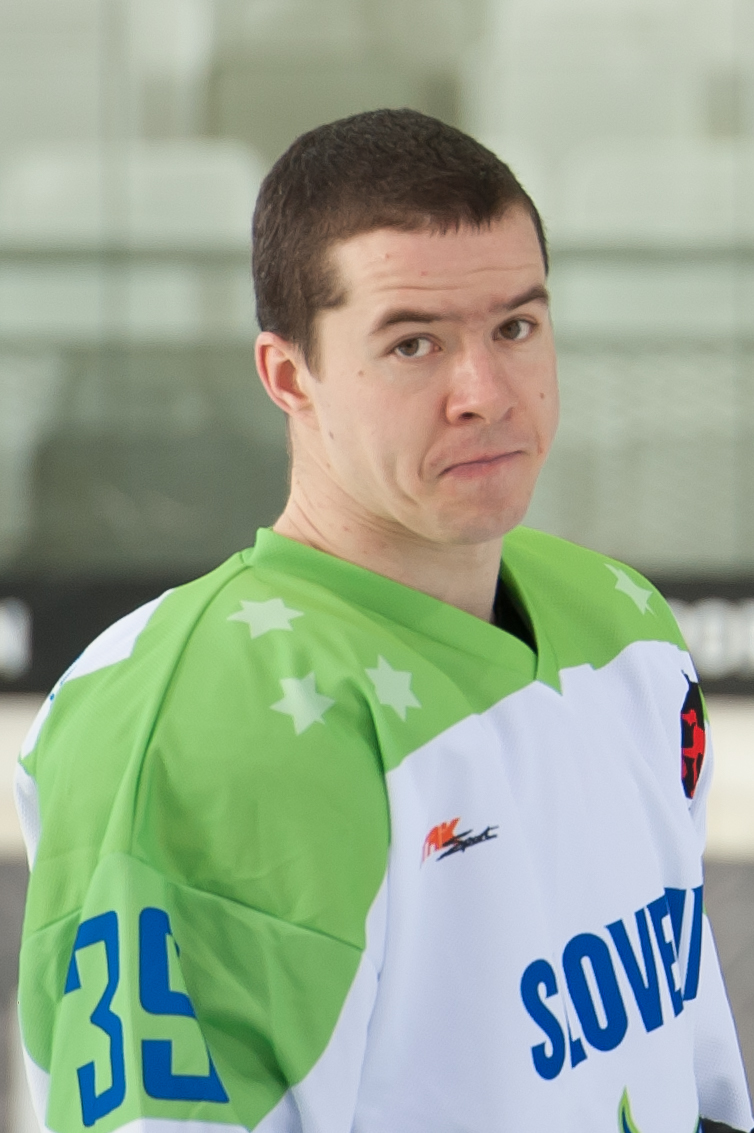
- Born: 30 August 1991 (age 34) Celje, Slovenia
- Height: 5 ft 9 in (175 cm)
- Weight: 181 lb (82 kg; 12 st 13 lb)
- Position: Forward
- Shoots: Right
- ICEHL team Former teams: Graz99ers; HDD Olimpija Ljubljana; Dauphins d'Épinal
- National team: Slovenia
- Playing career: 2007–present

Ken Ograjenšek (born 30 August 1991) is a Slovenian professional ice hockey player who is a forward for the Graz99ers of the ICE Hockey League (ICEHL). He previously played two seasons in Ligue Magnus with Dauphins d'Épinal before signing a two-year contract with Graz99ers on 4 July 2016.

He has played internationally with the Slovenia national team. He participated at the 2015 IIHF World Championship.

== Career statistics ==
=== Regular season and playoffs ===
			Regular season					Playoffs
Season	Team	League	GP	G	A	Pts	PIM	GP	G	A	Pts	PIM
2006–07	HDK Maribor/Celje	SVN U20	18	4	6	10	12	2	1	1	2	4
2007–08	HK Alfa	SVN U19	21	27	18	45	58	2	3	2	5	0
2007–08	HK Alfa	SVN	22	4	8	12	8	—	—	—	—	—
2008–09	HK Celje	SVN U19	28	63	34	97	44	2	0	2	2	24
2008–09	HK Alfa	SVN	18	4	13	17	14	—	—	—	—	—
2009–10	HK Celje	SVN U19	19	43	35	78	52	2	3	0	3	4
2009–10	HK Olimpija	Slohokej	26	14	25	39	16	2	0	0	0	2
2009–10	HK Olimpija	SVN	4	0	1	1	2	—	—	—	—	—
2010–11	HK Olimpija	Slohokej	27	22	52	74	20	8	4	16	20	4
2010–11	HK Olimpija	SVN	4	2	4	6	2	3	3	7	10	12
2011–12	HDD Olimpija Ljubljana	EBEL	50	1	6	7	12	11	0	2	2	4
2011–12	HK Olimpija	Slohokej	9	5	13	18	2	—	—	—	—	—
2011–12	HDD Olimpija Ljubljana	SVN	—	—	—	—	—	6	0	0	0	0
2012–13	HDD Olimpija Ljubljana	EBEL	39	1	1	2	2	—	—	—	—	—
2012–13	HDD Olimpija Ljubljana	SVN	—	—	—	—	—	4	0	0	0	2
2013–14	HDD Olimpija Ljubljana	EBEL	54	16	19	35	37	—	—	—	—	—
2013–14	HDD Olimpija Ljubljana	SVN	—	—	—	—	—	4	6	1	7	4
2014–15	Gamyo d'Épinal	FRA	25	9	12	21	34	23	4	9	13	28
2015–16	Gamyo d'Épinal	FRA	26	16	19	35	18	12	9	9	18	18
2016–17	Graz 99ers	EBEL	53	7	21	28	14	5	0	1	1	2
2017–18	Graz 99ers	EBEL	50	11	23	34	14	—	—	—	—	—
2018–19	Graz 99ers	EBEL	38	10	16	26	12	10	2	6	8	2
2019–20	Graz 99ers	EBEL	46	11	29	40	20	3	0	1	1	0
2020–21	Graz99ers	ICEHL	48	8	15	23	26	—	—	—	—	—
2021–22	Graz99ers	ICEHL	45	14	17	31	10	2	1	3	4	2
SVN totals			48	10	26	36	26	17	9	8	17	18
AUT totals			423	79	147	226	147	31	3	13	16	10

=== International ===
Year	Team	Event	GP	G	A	Pts	PIM
2008	Slovenia	WJC18 D1	5	2	1	3	0
2009	Slovenia	WJC18 D2	5	7	9	16	0
2010	Slovenia	WJC D1	5	1	0	1	0
2011	Slovenia	WJC D1	5	6	1	7	4
2015	Slovenia	WC	6	0	1	1	0
2016	Slovenia	WC D1A	5	2	4	6	2
2016	Slovenia	OGQ	3	0	2	2	0
2017	Slovenia	WC	7	0	1	1	2
2018	Slovenia	OG	4	0	0	0	0
2018	Slovenia	WC D1A	5	0	3	3	0
2019	Slovenia	WC D1A	5	2	1	3	4
2020	Slovenia	OGQ	3	2	3	5	0
2021	Slovenia	OGQ	3	0	2	2	0
2022	Slovenia	WC D1A	4	2	2	4	0
2023	Slovenia	WC	6	0	2	2	2
2025	Slovenia	WC	4	1	1	2	2
2026	Slovenia	WC	6	1	1	2	0
Junior totals			20	16	11	27	4
Senior totals			61	10	23	33	12
