= Žiga Pance =

Slovenian ice hockey player (born 1989)

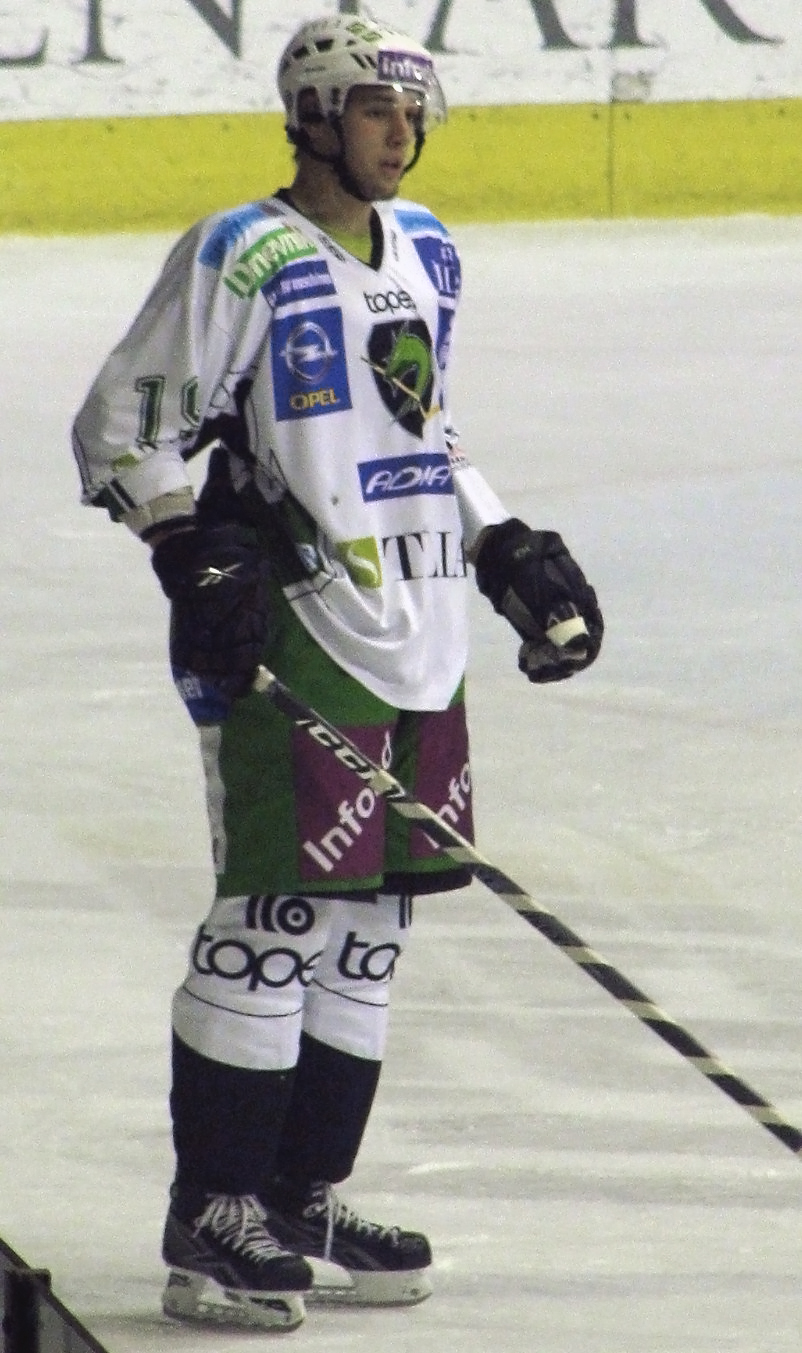
- Born: January 1, 1989 (age 37) Ljubljana, Yugoslavia
- Height: 6 ft 1 in (185 cm)
- Weight: 196 lb (89 kg; 14 st 0 lb)
- Position: Right wing
- Shoots: Left
- ICEHL team Former teams: HK Olimpija; HDD Olimpija Ljubljana; HC Bolzano; EC VSV; EC KAC; Dornbirner EC; DVTK Jegesmedvék; HC Slovan Bratislava
- National team: Slovenia
- NHL draft: Undrafted
- Playing career: 2006–present

Žiga Pance (born January 1, 1989) is a Slovenian professional ice hockey forward who is currently playing with HK Olimpija of the ICE Hockey League (ICEHL). He participated at several IIHF World Championships as a member of the Slovenia men's national ice hockey team.

== Playing career ==
He joined Italian club, HC Bolzano, from his original hometown club, HDD Olimpija Ljubljana, as a free agent on October 16, 2013.

On March 30, 2015, after two season in Bolzano, Pance left as a free agent to sign with fellow EBEL team, EC VSV. In the 2015–16 season, Pance built upon his EBEL career in recording 16 goals and 36 points in 49 games.

As a free agent at the conclusion of the season, Pance moved to local rivals, EC KAC, on a one-year contract on May 2, 2016.

== Career statistics ==
=== Regular season and playoffs ===
			Regular season					Playoffs
Season	Team	League	GP	G	A	Pts	PIM	GP	G	A	Pts	PIM
2004–05	HK Olimpija	SVN U20	1	0	0	0	0	4	1	0	1	27
2005–06	HK Olimpija	SVN U20
2005–06	HK Olimpija	SVN	28	16	5	21	76	—	—	—	—	—
2005–06	HK Olimpija	IEHL	22	0	4	4	0	—	—	—	—	—
2005–06	HDD Olimpija Ljubljana	SVN	2	0	0	0	0	—	—	—	—	—
2006–07	Oshawa Generals	OHL	24	2	1	3	15	1	0	0	0	0
2007–08	Oshawa Generals	OHL	8	0	0	0	4	—	—	—	—	—
2007–08	HK Olimpija	SVN	13	6	3	9	66	—	—	—	—	—
2007–08	HDD Olimpija Ljubljana	SVN	—	—	—	—	—	2	2	4	6	2
2007–08	HK Olimpija	SVN U19	11	9	15	24	143	9	10	10	20	28
2008–09	HDD Olimpija Ljubljana	AUT	50	4	4	8	10	—	—	—	—	—
2008–09	HK Olimpija	SVN	10	7	8	15	24	4	3	4	7	26
2008–09	HDD Olimpija Ljubljana	SVN	—	—	—	—	—	7	1	0	1	24
2009–10	HDD Olimpija Ljubljana	AUT	54	14	20	34	36	—	—	—	—	—
2009–10	HDD Olimpija Ljubljana	SVN	4	1	3	4	16	6	1	1	2	4
2010–11	HDD Olimpija Ljubljana	AUT	53	23	17	40	56	4	0	1	1	8
2010–11	HDD Olimpija Ljubljana	SVN	3	2	2	4	2	4	1	0	1	0
2011–12	HDD Olimpija Ljubljana	AUT	46	17	16	33	61	6	1	6	7	2
2011–12	HDD Olimpija Ljubljana	SVN	—	—	—	—	—	6	3	5	8	6
2012–13	HDD Olimpija Ljubljana	AUT	54	11	20	31	30	—	—	—	—	—
2012–13	HDD Olimpija Ljubljana	SVN	—	—	—	—	—	4	4	2	6	0
2013–14	HC Bolzano	AUT	41	14	7	21	17	13	3	6	9	2
2014–15	HC Bolzano	AUT	54	22	17	39	16	7	1	4	5	4
2015–16	EC VSV	AUT	49	16	20	36	23	11	2	9	11	4
2016–17	EC KAC	AUT	54	9	13	22	12	14	5	4	9	8
2017–18	Dornbirn Bulldogs	AUT	50	12	15	27	22	6	1	4	5	2
2018–19	DVTK Jegesmedvék	SVK	56	19	22	41	48	3	2	0	2	0
2019–20	HC Slovan Bratislava	SVK	30	10	6	16	6	—	—	—	—	—
2020–21	HK Olimpija	AlpsHL	36	22	17	39	22	11	9	6	15	11
2020–21	HK Olimpija	SVN	8	4	4	8	27	7	3	4	7	0
2021–22	HK Olimpija	ICEHL	46	12	16	28	20	7	4	3	7	2
2021–22	HK Olimpija	SVN	2	0	1	1	0	5	3	3	6	0
SVN totals			70	36	26	62	211	45	21	23	44	62
AUT/ICEHL totals			551	154	165	319	303	68	17	37	54	32

=== International ===
Year	Team	Event	GP	G	A	Pts	PIM
2006	Slovenia	WJC18 D1	5	2	0	2	4
2007	Slovenia	WJC D1	5	1	1	2	25
2009	Slovenia	WJC D1	5	6	2	8	22
2009	Slovenia	WC D1	5	0	0	0	2
2010	Slovenia	WC D1	5	1	2	3	6
2011	Slovenia	WC	6	0	0	0	2
2012	Slovenia	WC D1A	5	0	0	0	2
2013	Slovenia	OGQ	3	0	0	0	0
2013	Slovenia	WC	7	0	0	0	4
2014	Slovenia	OG	5	0	0	0	0
2014	Slovenia	WC D1A	5	0	1	1	2
2015	Slovenia	WC	7	3	0	3	0
2016	Slovenia	WC D1A	5	1	2	3	2
2016	Slovenia	OGQ	3	0	1	1	2
2018	Slovenia	OG	4	1	0	1	2
2018	Slovenia	WC D1A	5	0	0	0	14
2019	Slovenia	WC D1A	5	0	1	1	0
2021	Slovenia	OGQ	2	0	0	0	0
2022	Slovenia	WC D1A	4	1	0	1	0
2023	Slovenia	WC	7	0	1	1	4
Junior totals			15	9	3	12	51
Senior totals			83	7	8	15	42
