= Robert Sabolič =

Slovenian ice hockey player

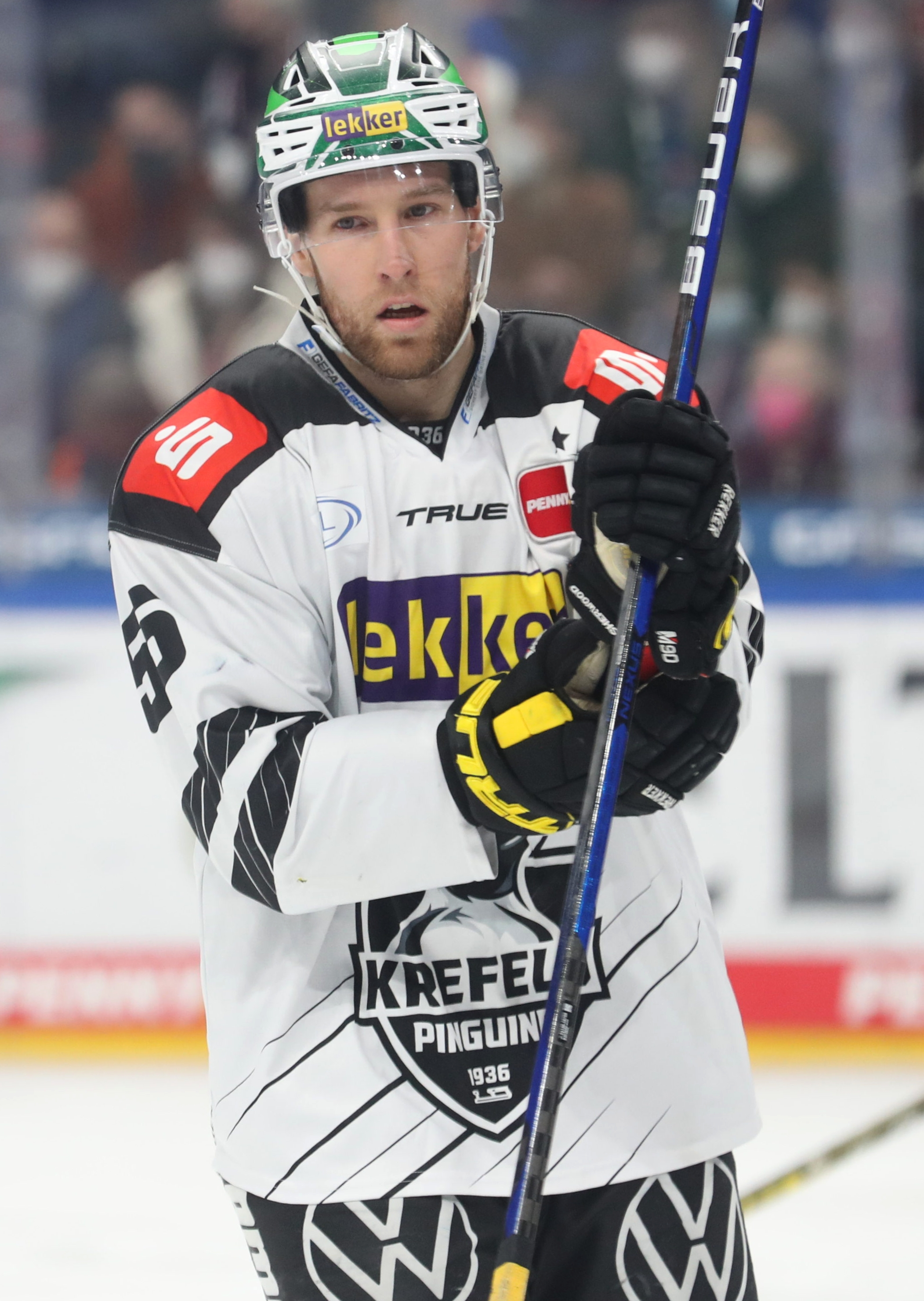
- Born: 18 September 1988 (age 38) Jesenice, Yugoslavia
- Height: 6 ft 0 in (183 cm)
- Weight: 201 lb (91 kg; 14 st 5 lb)
- Position: Right wing
- Shoots: Left
- AlpsHL team Former teams: HD Mladi Jesenice; HK Jesenice; ERC Ingolstadt; HC Sparta Praha; Admiral Vladivostok; Torpedo Nizhny Novgorod; HC Ambrì-Piotta; IK Oskarshamn; Krefeld Pinguine; EC VSV; HK Olimpija
- National team: Slovenia
- Playing career: 2006–present

Robert Sabolič (born 18 September 1988) is a Slovenian professional ice hockey player who is a right winger for HD Mladi Jesenice of the Alps Hockey League (AlpsHL). He participated at several IIHF World Championships as a member of the Slovenia national team. He has previously played with Russian ice hockey club Torpedo Nizhny Novgorod.

During the 2013–14 season, Sabolič won the German championship with Ingolstadt. He was an important part in Ingolstadt's success, with fourteen points, nine goals, and four assists in 21 post-season matches. Sabolič also scored the most goals during the 2013–14 DEL playoffs.

After parts of two seasons with Torpedo Nizhny Novgorod, Sabolič left the Kontinental Hockey League (KHL) following the 2018–19 season, signing a-year contract with Swiss club HC Ambrì-Piotta on 26 July 2019.

== Career statistics ==
=== Regular season and playoffs ===
			Regular season					Playoffs
Season	Team	League	GP	G	A	Pts	PIM	GP	G	A	Pts	PIM
2004–05	HD Mladi Jesenice	SVN U20	10	0	0	0	0	1	0	0	0	0
2006–07	HD Mladi Jesenice	SVN U20	18	7	10	17	55	5	3	1	4	6
2006–07	HD Mladi Jesenice	SVN	15	1	1	2	8	—	—	—	—	—
2007–08	HD Mladi Jesenice	SVN	19	3	4	7	29	6	0	0	0	0
2008–09	HD Mladi Jesenice	SVN	35	25	22	47	18	2	0	0	0	2
2009–10	HD Mladi Jesenice	Slohokej	1	0	0	0	0	—	—	—	—	—
2009–10	HK Acroni Jesenice	AUT	53	8	11	19	96	—	—	—	—	—
2009–10	HK Acroni Jesenice	SVN	4	2	1	3	4	6	1	0	1	33
2010–11	HK Acroni Jesenice	AUT	54	33	26	59	64	—	—	—	—	—
2010–11	HK Acroni Jesenice	SVN	4	4	6	10	2	4	2	1	3	2
2011–12	Södertälje SK	Allsv	49	6	11	17	72	—	—	—	—	—
2012–13	HK AutoFinance Poprad	SVK	33	6	13	19	63	—	—	—	—	—
2012–13	ERC Ingolstadt	DEL	11	7	4	11	8	4	0	0	0	4
2013–14	ERC Ingolstadt	DEL	48	11	13	24	14	21	9	5	14	10
2014–15	HC Sparta Praha	ELH	51	14	15	29	54	10	4	1	5	12
2015–16	HC Sparta Praha	ELH	46	23	11	34	46	17	1	4	5	14
2016–17	Admiral Vladivostok	KHL	58	19	25	44	48	2	0	0	0	0
2017–18	Admiral Vladivostok	KHL	44	10	15	25	32	—	—	—	—	—
2017–18	Torpedo Nizhny Novgorod	KHL	8	0	4	4	6	4	0	1	1	0
2018–19	Torpedo Nizhny Novgorod	KHL	58	16	11	27	29	7	3	0	3	4
2019–20	HC Ambrì–Piotta	NL	27	5	8	13	20	—	—	—	—	—
2020–21	IK Oskarshamn	SHL	18	1	6	7	2	—	—	—	—	—
2021–22	Krefeld Pinguine	DEL	53	17	15	32	20	—	—	—	—	—
2022–23	EC VSV	ICEHL	48	18	33	51	18	5	0	0	0	4
2023–24	EC VSV	ICEHL	47	21	23	44	20	5	2	5	7	27
2024–25	HK Olimpija	ICEHL	46	13	20	33	20	2	0	0	0	0
2025–26	HK Olimpija	ICEHL	35	6	12	18	4	10	1	3	4	41
KHL totals			168	45	55	100	115	13	3	1	4	4
SHL totals			18	1	6	7	2	—	—	—	—	—
NL totals			27	5	8	13	20	—	—	—	—	—

=== International ===
Year	Team	Event	GP	G	A	Pts	PIM
2011	Slovenia	WC	6	1	3	4	0
2012	Slovenia	WC D1A	5	2	2	4	4
2013	Slovenia	OGQ	3	3	1	4	0
2013	Slovenia	WC	7	2	1	3	4
2014	Slovenia	OG	5	0	2	2	6
2015	Slovenia	WC	6	1	0	1	6
2016	Slovenia	WC D1A	3	2	1	3	0
2016	Slovenia	OGQ	3	0	1	1	0
2017	Slovenia	WC	7	2	4	6	4
2018	Slovenia	OG	4	0	0	0	0
2018	Slovenia	WC	5	0	1	1	4
2019	Slovenia	WC	5	3	2	5	4
2020	Slovenia	OGQ	3	2	4	6	12
2021	Slovenia	OGQ	3	3	0	3	4
2022	Slovenia	WC	4	4	1	5	2
2023	Slovenia	WC	6	0	0	0	6
2024	Slovenia	WC	5	1	4	5	0
2024	Slovenia	OGQ	2	0	0	0	0
2025	Slovenia	WC	7	1	1	2	4
2026	Slovenia	WC	7	0	4	4	4
Senior totals			96	27	32	59	64
