= Miha Verlič =

Slovenian ice hockey player

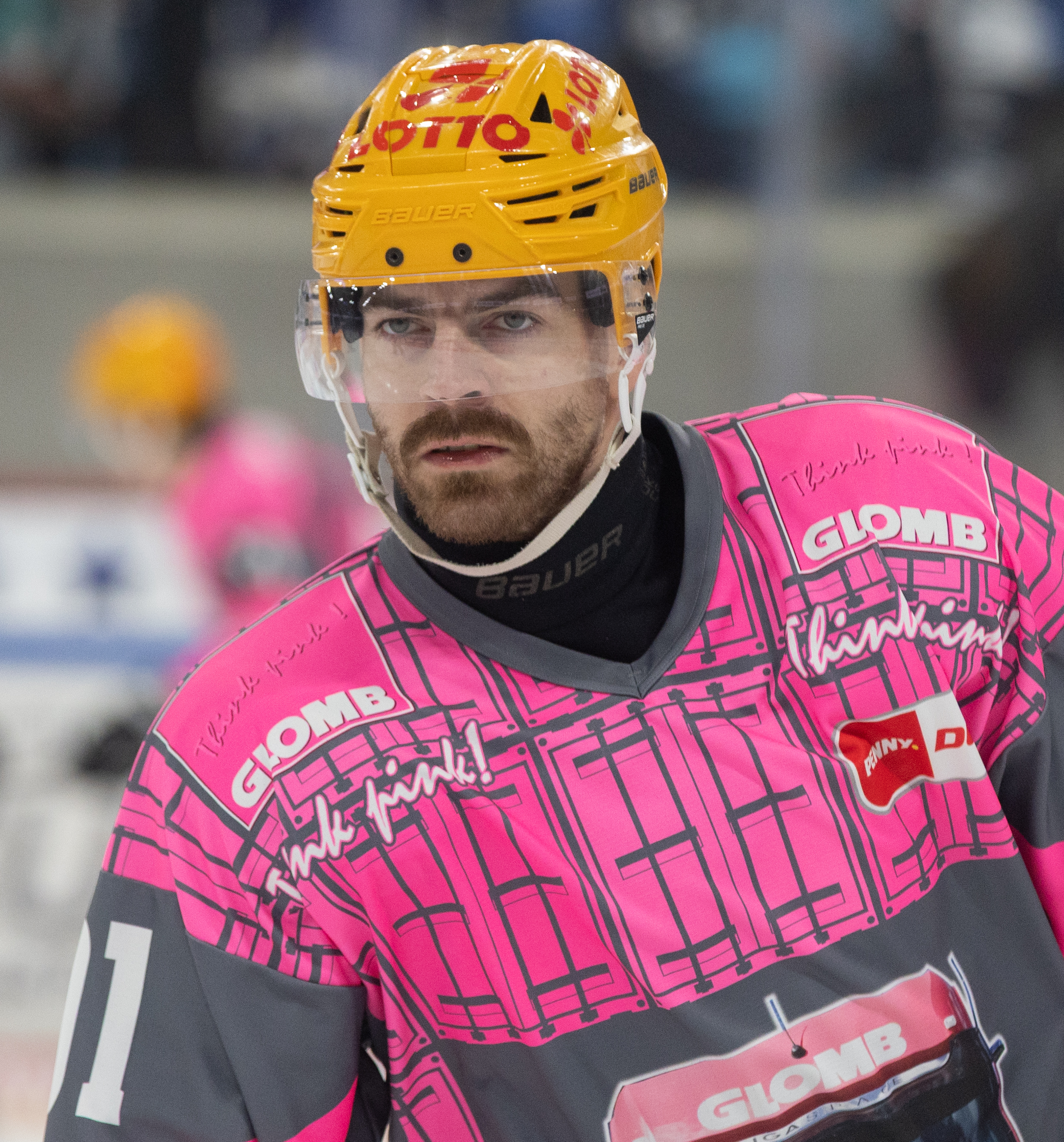
- Verlič in 2026
- Born: 21 August 1991 (age 34) Maribor, Slovenia
- Height: 6 ft 4 in (193 cm)
- Weight: 187 lb (85 kg; 13 st 5 lb)
- Position: Centre
- Shoots: Left
- DEL team Former teams: Fischtown Pinguins; HDD Olimpija Ljubljana; Graz 99ers EC VSV; JYP Jyväskylä
- National team: Slovenia
- Playing career: 2007–present

Miha Verlič (born 21 August 1991) is a Slovenian professional ice hockey forward currently playing for the Fischtown Pinguins of the Deutsche Eishockey Liga (DEL).

== Playing career ==
He originally played with HDD Olimpija Ljubljana in the EBEL before joining fellow EBEL competitors, Graz 99ers on a two-year deal on 6 May 2014.

After one season with Graz, Verlič was released from the second year of his contract, and quickly signed a one-year deal as a free agent with fellow EBEL club, EC VSV on 27 April 2015.

His elder brother Jure also played the sport professionally.

== International play ==
He represented Slovenia at the 2014 Winter Olympics in Sochi.

== Career statistics ==
=== Regular season and playoffs ===
			Regular season					Playoffs
Season	Team	League	GP	G	A	Pts	PIM	GP	G	A	Pts	PIM
2006–07	HDK Maribor	SVN	4	0	0	0	0	—	—	—	—	—
2006–07	HDK Maribor/Celje	SVN U20	16	4	2	6	8	1	0	0	0	0
2007–08	HDK Maribor	SVN	26	3	8	11	6	5	0	0	0	0
2007–08	HDK Maribor	SVN U19	22	7	9	16	39	5	4	2	6	6
2008–09	HDK Maribor	SVN	31	7	13	20	10	7	0	0	0	2
2008–09	HDK Maribor	SVN U19	20	13	20	33	22	5	2	3	5	2
2009–10	HC Slezan Opava	CZE U20	29	7	13	20	14	—	—	—	—	—
2009–10	HC Slezan Opava	CZE.3	8	0	0	0	0	—	—	—	—	—
2010–11	HC Slezan Opava	CZE U20	50	15	8	23	26	—	—	—	—	—
2011–12	HDD Olimpija Ljubljana	AUT	35	3	3	6	39	11	0	0	0	5
2011–12	HDD Olimpija Ljubljana	SVN	—	—	—	—	—	5	1	3	4	2
2011–12	HDD Olimpija Ljubljana	Slohokej	3	3	2	5	0	—	—	—	—	—
2012–13	HDD Olimpija Ljubljana	AUT	54	7	9	16	12	—	—	—	—	—
2012–13	HDD Olimpija Ljubljana	SVN	—	—	—	—	—	4	1	3	4	0
2013–14	HDD Olimpija Ljubljana	AUT	50	20	20	40	16	—	—	—	—	—
2013–14	HDD Olimpija Ljubljana	SVN	—	—	—	—	—	4	1	1	2	0
2014–15	Graz99ers	AUT	28	6	5	11	31	—	—	—	—	—
2015–16	EC VSV	AUT	52	12	15	27	15	11	0	3	3	2
2016–17	EC VSV	AUT	53	21	11	32	9	—	—	—	—	—
2017–18	EC VSV	AUT	48	15	18	33	16	—	—	—	—	—
2017–18	JYP	Liiga	3	1	1	2	2	6	0	2	2	2
2018–19	Fischtown Penguins	DEL	52	14	15	29	36	3	0	2	2	0
2019–20	Fischtown Penguins	DEL	49	17	15	32	6	—	—	—	—	—
2020–21	Fischtown Penguins	DEL	38	14	17	31	6	3	1	1	2	0
2021–22	Fischtown Penguins	DEL	53	23	20	43	10	5	1	0	1	2
2022–23	Fischtown Penguins	DEL	52	10	15	25	10	8	1	2	3	2
2023–24	Fischtown Penguins	DEL	35	9	9	18	8	14	4	6	10	14
2024–25	Fischtown Penguins	DEL	48	14	15	29	8	6	2	3	5	0
SVN totals			61	10	21	31	16	25	3	7	10	6
AUT totals			320	84	81	165	138	22	0	3	3	7
DEL totals			327	101	106	207	84	39	9	14	23	18

=== International ===
Year	Team	Event	GP	G	A	Pts	PIM
2008	Slovenia	WJC18 D1	5	0	1	1	0
2009	Slovenia	WJC18 D2	5	3	3	6	0
2010	Slovenia	WJC D1	5	1	1	2	2
2011	Slovenia	WJC D1	5	3	2	5	2
2014	Slovenia	OG	1	0	0	0	0
2014	Slovenia	WC D1A	5	1	0	1	0
2015	Slovenia	WC	5	0	0	0	0
2016	Slovenia	WC D1A	5	2	2	4	6
2016	Slovenia	OGQ	3	0	1	1	2
2017	Slovenia	WC	7	1	1	2	0
2018	Slovenia	OG	4	0	2	2	0
2018	Slovenia	WC D1A	5	3	4	7	2
2019	Slovenia	WC D1A	5	0	1	1	4
2020	Slovenia	OGQ	3	3	1	4	0
2021	Slovenia	OGQ	3	1	0	1	2
2022	Slovenia	WC D1A	4	4	1	5	0
2023	Slovenia	WC	7	2	1	3	0
2024	Slovenia	OGQ	3	0	0	0	0
Junior totals			20	7	7	14	4
Senior totals			60	17	14	31	16
