= Žiga Jeglič =

Slovenian ice hockey player (born 1988)

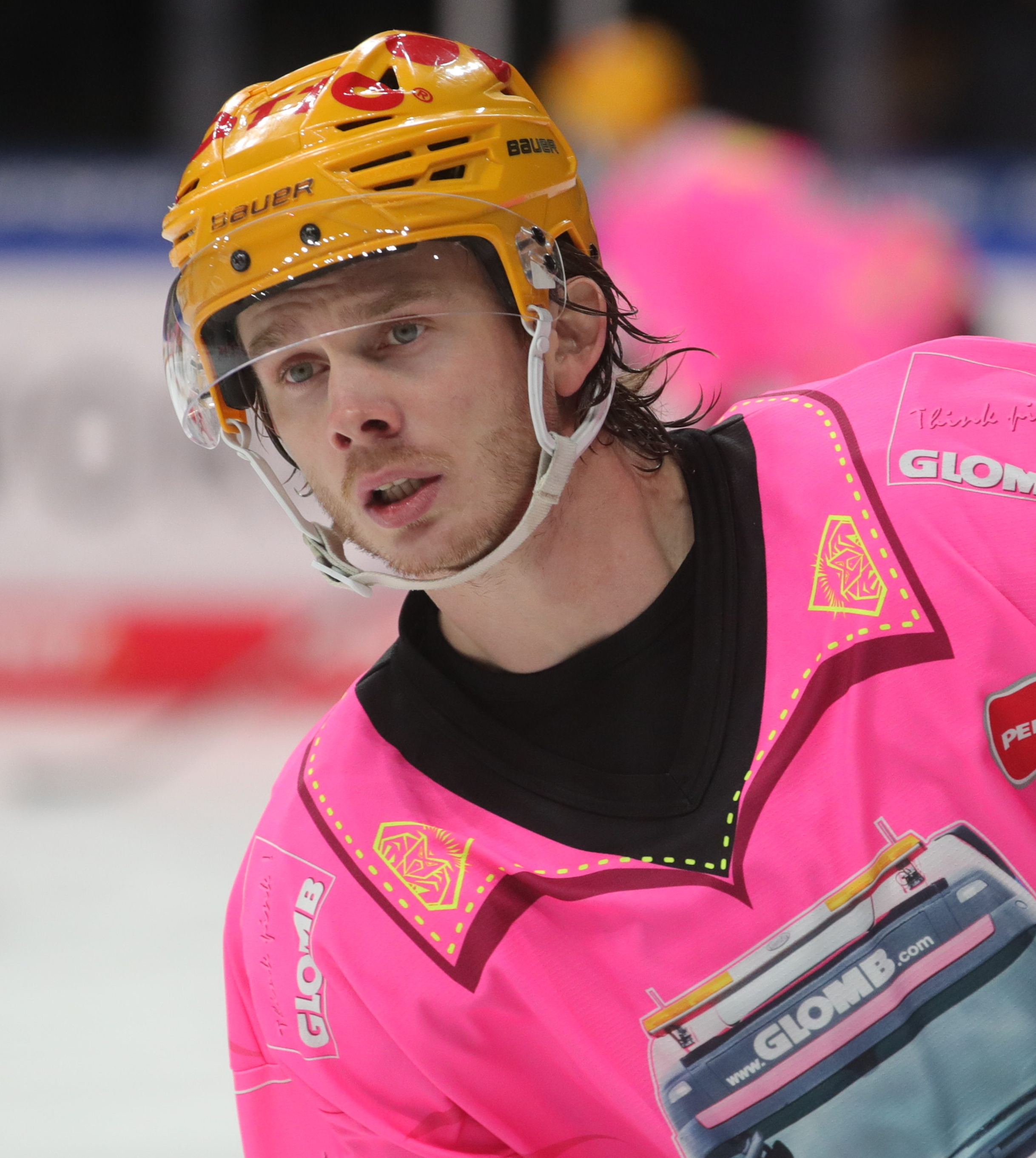
- Žiga Jeglič (2023)
- Born: 24 February 1988 (age 38) Kranj, SR Slovenia, SFR Yugoslavia
- Height: 6 ft 1 in (185 cm)
- Weight: 176 lb (80 kg; 12 st 8 lb)
- Position: Left wing
- Shoots: Right
- DEL team Former teams: Fischtown Pinguins; HK Bled; HK Acroni Jesenice; Södertälje SK; Ässät; ERC Ingolstadt; HC Slovan Bratislava; Torpedo Nizhny Novgorod; Neftekhimik Nizhnekamsk; PSG Berani Zlín; BK Mladá Boleslav
- National team: Slovenia
- Playing career: 2008–present

Žiga Jeglič (born 24 February 1988) is a Slovenian ice hockey player who is currently playing for Fischtown Pinguins of the Deutsche Eishockey Liga (DEL). He is also a member of the Slovenia men's national ice hockey team.

== Playing career ==
During the 2013–14 season he has won the German championship with ERC Ingolstadt. Jeglič was an important part in ERC Ingolstadt's success, and was tied second in scoring during the 2013–14 playoffs with 15 points (4 goals, 11 assists) in 21 postseason games.

On 20 February 2018, during the 2018 Winter Olympics, Žiga Jeglič tested positive for fenoterol in an in-competition test. He was subsequently issued with an eight-month ban due to unintentional use for fenoterol in his asthma medication for which he did not have a exemption.

== Career statistics ==
=== Regular season and playoffs ===
			Regular season					Playoffs
Season	Team	League	GP	G	A	Pts	PIM	GP	G	A	Pts	PIM
2003–04	HKMK Bled	SVN U20	17	0	0	1	8	—	—	—	—	—
2004–05	HKMK Bled	SVN U20	18	2	5	7	34	—	—	—	—	—
2005–06	HKMK Bled	SVN U20	—	—	—	—	—	—	—	—	—	—
2005–06	HKMK Bled	AUT.4	—	14	14	28	60	—	—	—	—	—
2006–07	HKMK Bled	SVN U20	19	13	9	22	38	5	3	5	8	2
2006–07	HKMK Bled	AUT.4	21	15	17	32	83	—	—	—	—	—
2007–08	HD Mladi Jesenice	SVN	27	12	22	34	52	6	3	2	5	10
2008–09	HK Acroni Jesenice	AUT	42	3	8	11	14	5	0	0	0	0
2008–09	HD Mladi Jesenice	SVN	12	9	11	20	28	1	0	0	0	0
2009–10	HK Acroni Jesenice	AUT	54	9	13	22	46	—	—	—	—	—
2009–10	HK Acroni Jesenice	SVN	4	3	1	4	8	6	0	1	1	6
2010–11	HK Acroni Jesenice	AUT	54	14	40	54	69	—	—	—	—	—
2010–11	HK Acroni Jesenice	SVN	4	1	3	4	0	4	0	1	1	14
2011–12	Södertälje SK	Allsv	44	10	11	21	88	—	—	—	—	—
2012–13	Södertälje SK	Allsv	50	8	27	35	98	10	2	1	3	4
2013–14	Ässät	Liiga	32	2	2	4	18	—	—	—	—	—
2013–14	ERC Ingolstadt	DEL	11	4	5	9	18	21	4	11	15	8
2014–15	HC Slovan Bratislava	KHL	57	8	15	23	39	—	—	—	—	—
2015–16	HC Slovan Bratislava	KHL	60	7	18	25	24	4	0	0	0	4
2016–17	HC Slovan Bratislava	KHL	58	11	17	28	30	—	—	—	—	—
2017–18	Torpedo Nizhny Novgorod	KHL	15	0	4	4	2	—	—	—	—	—
2017–18	Neftekhimik Nizhnekamsk	KHL	26	2	4	6	6	—	—	—	—	—
2018–19	HC Slovan Bratislava	KHL	32	1	2	3	2	—	—	—	—	—
2019–20	PSG Berani Zlín	ELH	5	1	4	5	4	—	—	—	—	—
2019–20	BK Mladá Boleslav	ELH	33	10	10	20	30	—	—	—	—	—
2020–21	Fischtown Penguins	DEL	37	12	23	35	55	3	0	2	2	2
2021–22	Fischtown Penguins	DEL	55	15	42	57	40	1	0	0	0	0
2022–23	Fischtown Penguins	DEL	47	7	31	38	30	7	0	5	5	2
2023–24	Fischtown Penguins	DEL	52	14	36	50	16	14	1	9	10	22
2024–25	Fischtown Penguins	DEL	48	10	32	42	28	6	2	2	4	2
AUT totals			150	26	61	87	129	5	0	0	0	0
KHL totals			248	29	59	88	103	4	0	0	0	4
DEL totals			250	62	169	231	187	52	7	29	36	36

=== International ===
Year	Team	Event	GP	G	A	Pts	PIM
2006	Slovenia	WJC18 D1	5	2	1	3	0
2007	Slovenia	WJC D1	5	1	1	2	2
2008	Slovenia	WJC D1	5	1	2	3	4
2010	Slovenia	WC D1	5	2	9	11	0
2011	Slovenia	WC	6	1	2	3	10
2012	Slovenia	WC D1A	5	1	3	4	6
2013	Slovenia	OGQ	3	1	3	4	0
2013	Slovenia	WC	7	1	1	2	0
2014	Slovenia	OG	5	2	2	4	2
2015	Slovenia	WC	7	1	1	2	2
2016	Slovenia	WC D1A	5	2	2	4	2
2016	Slovenia	OGQ	3	1	1	2	0
2017	Slovenia	WC	5	2	0	2	4
2018	Slovenia	OG	3	1	0	1	4
2020	Slovenia	OGQ	3	2	2	4	2
2021	Slovenia	OGQ	3	1	3	4	2
2022	Slovenia	WC D1A	4	3	4	7	2
2023	Slovenia	WC	7	0	2	2	0
2024	Slovenia	OGQ	3	1	3	4	0
Junior totals			15	4	4	8	6
Senior totals			74	22	38	60	36
