= Rok Tičar =

Slovenian ice hockey player (born 1989)

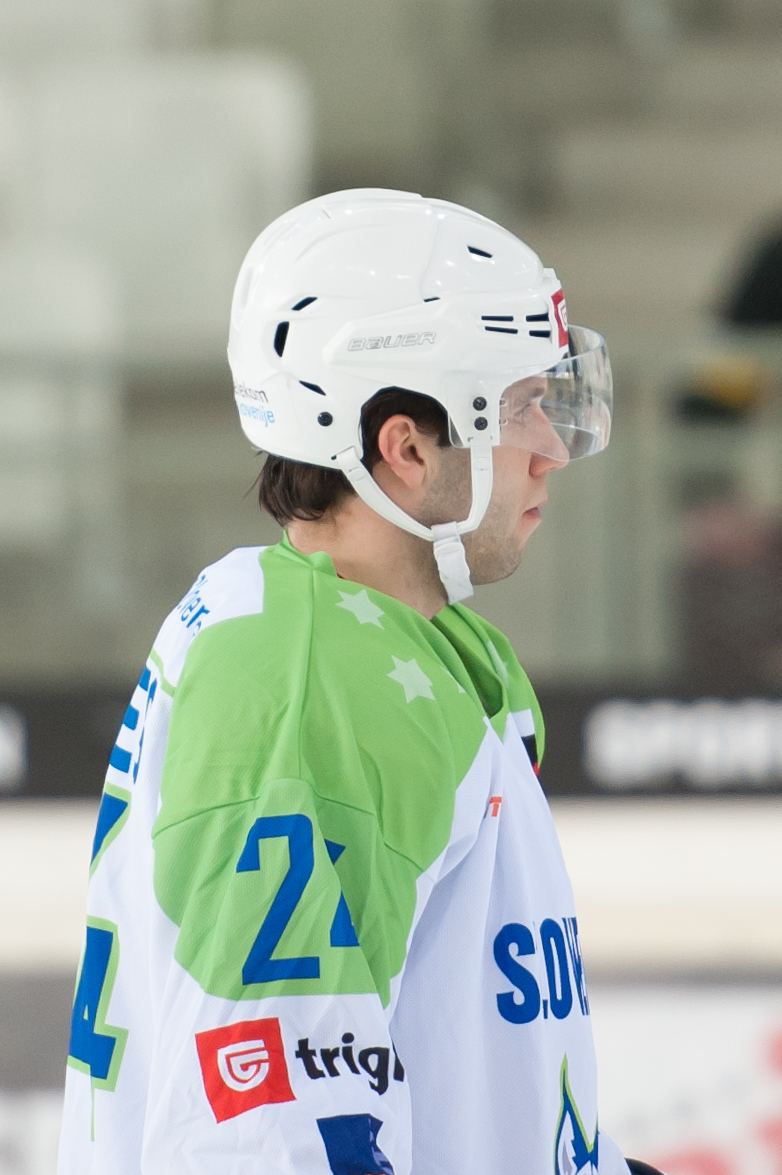
- Born: 3 May 1989 (age 37) Jesenice, Yugoslavia
- Height: 5 ft 10 in (178 cm)
- Weight: 179 lb (81 kg; 12 st 11 lb)
- Position: Centre
- Shoots: Left
- ICEHL team Former teams: HC Pustertal Wölfe; Timrå IK; HK Acroni Jesenice; Krefeld Pinguine; Kölner Haie; HC Slovan Bratislava; Avtomobilist Yekaterinburg; Torpedo Nizhny Novgorod; HC Sibir Novosibirsk; Kunlun Red Star; IK Oskarshamn; EC KAC; Vienna Capitals; Graz 99ers
- National team: Slovenia
- Playing career: 2005–present

Rok Tičar (born 3 May 1989) is a Slovenian professional ice hockey player who is a centre for HC Pustertal Wölfe of the ICE Hockey League (ICEHL). He has participated in several IIHF World Championships as a member of the Slovenia national team. Tičar has previously played with HC Slovan Bratislava and with the Russian club Avtomobilist Yekaterinburg in the Kontinental Hockey League (KHL).

== Career statistics ==
=== Regular season and playoffs ===
			Regular season					Playoffs
Season	Team	League	GP	G	A	Pts	PIM	GP	G	A	Pts	PIM
2005–06	HD Mladi Jesenice	SVN U18
2005–06	HK Kranjska Gora	SVN	27	4	1	5	6	—	—	—	—	—
2006–07	HD Mladi Jesenice	SVN	22	8	6	14	39	—	—	—	—	—
2006–07	HD Mladi Jesenice	SVN U20	18	21	14	35	24	5	7	3	10	6
2007–08	Timrå IK	J20	38	11	9	20	28	—	—	—	—	—
2007–08	Timrå IK	SEL	4	0	1	1	0	—	—	—	—	—
2008–09	Timrå IK	J20	39	12	22	34	47	—	—	—	—	—
2008–09	Timrå IK	SEL	1	0	0	0	0	—	—	—	—	—
2009–10	HK Acroni Jesenice	AUT	45	13	15	28	35	—	—	—	—	—
2009–10	HK Acroni Jesenice	SVN	4	3	1	4	2	6	4	5	9	2
2010–11	HK Acroni Jesenice	AUT	54	24	44	68	16	—	—	—	—	—
2010–11	HK Acroni Jesenice	SVN	4	7	3	10	0	4	1	3	4	12
2011–12	Krefeld Pinguine	DEL	47	7	13	20	51	—	—	—	—	—
2012–13	Kölner Haie	DEL	51	9	15	24	16	12	2	4	6	2
2013–14	Kölner Haie	DEL	49	9	23	32	18	12	0	2	2	4
2014–15	HC Slovan Bratislava	KHL	59	11	19	30	30	—	—	—	—	—
2015–16	HC Slovan Bratislava	KHL	57	14	17	31	24	4	0	0	0	2
2016–17	Avtomobilist Yekaterinburg	KHL	55	15	8	23	22	—	—	—	—	—
2017–18	Avtomobilist Yekaterinburg	KHL	8	0	4	4	4	—	—	—	—	—
2017–18	Torpedo Nizhny Novgorod	KHL	15	0	3	3	10	—	—	—	—	—
2017–18	Sibir Novosibirsk	KHL	15	4	3	7	16	—	—	—	—	—
2018–19	Kunlun Red Star	KHL	12	0	2	2	4	—	—	—	—	—
2018–19	Kölner Haie	DEL	13	3	3	6	2	11	1	5	6	4
2019–20	IK Oskarshamn	SHL	19	0	0	0	2	—	—	—	—	—
2019–20	EC KAC	AUT	9	2	4	6	26	1	0	1	1	2
2020–21	EC KAC	ICEHL	48	19	25	44	26	15	5	12	17	11
2021–22	EC KAC	ICEHL	43	7	33	40	18	2	1	3	4	0
AUT/ICEHL totals			199	65	121	186	121	18	6	16	22	13
DEL totals			160	28	54	82	87	35	3	11	14	10
KHL totals			221	44	56	100	110	4	0	0	0	2

=== International ===
Year	Team	Event	GP	G	A	Pts	PIM
2006	Slovenia	WJC18 D1	5	1	0	1	2
2007	Slovenia	WJC18 D1	5	2	4	6	2
2008	Slovenia	WJC D1	5	1	4	5	4
2009	Slovenia	WJC D1	5	2	5	7	0
2009	Slovenia	WC D1	5	0	2	2	0
2010	Slovenia	WC D1	5	7	3	10	2
2011	Slovenia	WC	5	3	0	3	2
2012	Slovenia	WC D1A	5	3	3	6	4
2013	Slovenia	OGQ	3	1	3	4	0
2013	Slovenia	WC	7	3	3	6	4
2014	Slovenia	OG	5	1	1	2	0
2015	Slovenia	WC	7	0	2	2	2
2016	Slovenia	WC D1A	5	1	3	4	0
2016	Slovenia	OGQ	3	3	1	4	0
2017	Slovenia	WC	7	1	1	2	2
2018	Slovenia	OG	4	0	1	1	2
2018	Slovenia	WC D1A	5	1	2	3	4
2020	Slovenia	OGQ	3	4	2	6	0
2021	Slovenia	OGQ	3	1	1	2	0
2022	Slovenia	WC D1A	4	2	4	6	0
2023	Slovenia	WC	7	0	2	2	4
2024	Slovenia	WC D1A	5	4	0	4	2
2024	Slovenia	OGQ	2	1	0	1	0
2026	Slovenia	WC	7	2	4	6	0
Junior totals			20	6	13	19	8
Senior totals			87	31	33	64	26
