= Neil Sheehy =

Canadian-born American ice hockey player

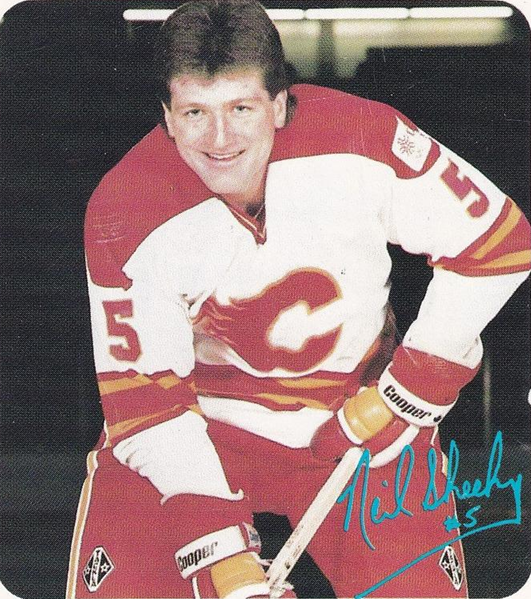
- Sheehy in 1986 card
- Born: February 9, 1960 (age 66) Fort Frances, Ontario, Canada
- Height: 6 ft 2 in (188 cm)
- Weight: 215 lb (98 kg; 15 st 5 lb)
- Position: Defence
- Shot: Right
- Played for: Calgary Flames; Hartford Whalers; Washington Capitals; Olimpija Hertz Ljubljana
- NHL draft: Undrafted
- Playing career: 1983–1994

Neil Kane Sheehy (born February 9, 1960) is a Canadian-born American former professional ice hockey player with dual citizenship. He grew up in International Falls, Minnesota.

A defenceman and Harvard University graduate, Sheehy signed as a free agent in 1983 by the Calgary Flames. His tough defensive play would help guide the Flames to their first finals appearance in 1986. He has also played for the Hartford Whalers and Washington Capitals.

Sheehy is one of two NHL players who wore the number 0, the other was Paul Bibeault. After NHL statisticians discovered a bug in their new stat-tracking software, the league restricted jersey numbers to whole numbers between 1 and 99 (later limited to numbers between 1 and 98 after the league-wide retirement of number 99 for Wayne Gretzky). This gives Sheehy the distinction of being the last player in NHL history to wear the number 0, with the Hartford Whalers in 1988.

His older brother is former NHL and USA Olympic team member Timothy Sheehy.

== Sexual assault allegation ==
In May 1990, while playing for the Capitals, Sheehy was accused of raping a 17-year-old girl outside a bar, alongside teammates Dino Ciccarelli, Scott Stevens, and Geoff Courtnall. The court case fell apart, though a spokesperson for the Metropolitan police at the time stated (without any supporting evidence available for use at trial,) that the police “have sufficient grounds to believe that a criminal offense did occur.”

== Career statistics ==
=== Regular season and playoffs ===
			Regular season					Playoffs
Season	Team	League	GP	G	A	Pts	PIM	GP	G	A	Pts	PIM
1978–79	Phillips Academy Andover	HS-MA	—	—	—	—	—	—	—	—	—	—
1979–80	Harvard University	ECAC	13	0	0	0	10	—	—	—	—	—
1980–81	Harvard University	ECAC	26	4	8	12	22	—	—	—	—	—
1981–82	Harvard University	ECAC	30	7	11	18	46	—	—	—	—	—
1982–83	Harvard University	ECAC	34	5	13	18	48	—	—	—	—	—
1983–84	Calgary Flames	NHL	1	1	0	1	2	4	0	0	0	4
1983–84	Colorado Flames	CHL	74	5	18	23	151	—	—	—	—	—
1984–85	Calgary Flames	NHL	31	3	4	7	109	—	—	—	—	—
1984–85	Moncton Golden Flames	AHL	34	6	9	15	101	—	—	—	—	—
1985–86	Calgary Flames	NHL	65	2	16	18	271	22	0	2	2	79
1985–86	Moncton Golden Flames	AHL	4	1	1	2	21	—	—	—	—	—
1986–87	Calgary Flames	NHL	54	4	6	10	151	6	0	0	0	21
1987–88	Calgary Flames	NHL	36	2	6	8	73	—	—	—	—	—
1987–88	Hartford Whalers	NHL	26	1	4	5	116	1	0	0	0	7
1988–89	Washington Capitals	NHL	72	3	4	7	179	6	0	0	0	19
1989–90	Washington Capitals	NHL	59	1	5	6	291	13	0	1	1	92
1990–91	Washington Capitals	NHL	—	—	—	—	—	2	0	0	0	19
1991–92	Calgary Flames	NHL	35	1	2	3	119	—	—	—	—	—
1991–92	Salt Lake Golden Eagles	IHL	6	0	0	0	34	—	—	—	—	—
1992–93	Olimpija Ljubljana	SLO	—	—	—	—	—	—	—	—	—	—
1993–94	Olimpija Ljubljana	SLO	23	14	23	37	89	—	—	—	—	—
NHL totals			379	18	47	65	1311	54	0	3	3	241

=== International ===
Year	Team	Event	GP	G	A	Pts	PIM
1985	United States	WC	8	0	0	0	14
1992	United States	WC	6	0	0	0	2
Senior totals			14	0	0	0	16
