= Anže Kuralt =

Slovenian ice hockey player (born 1991)

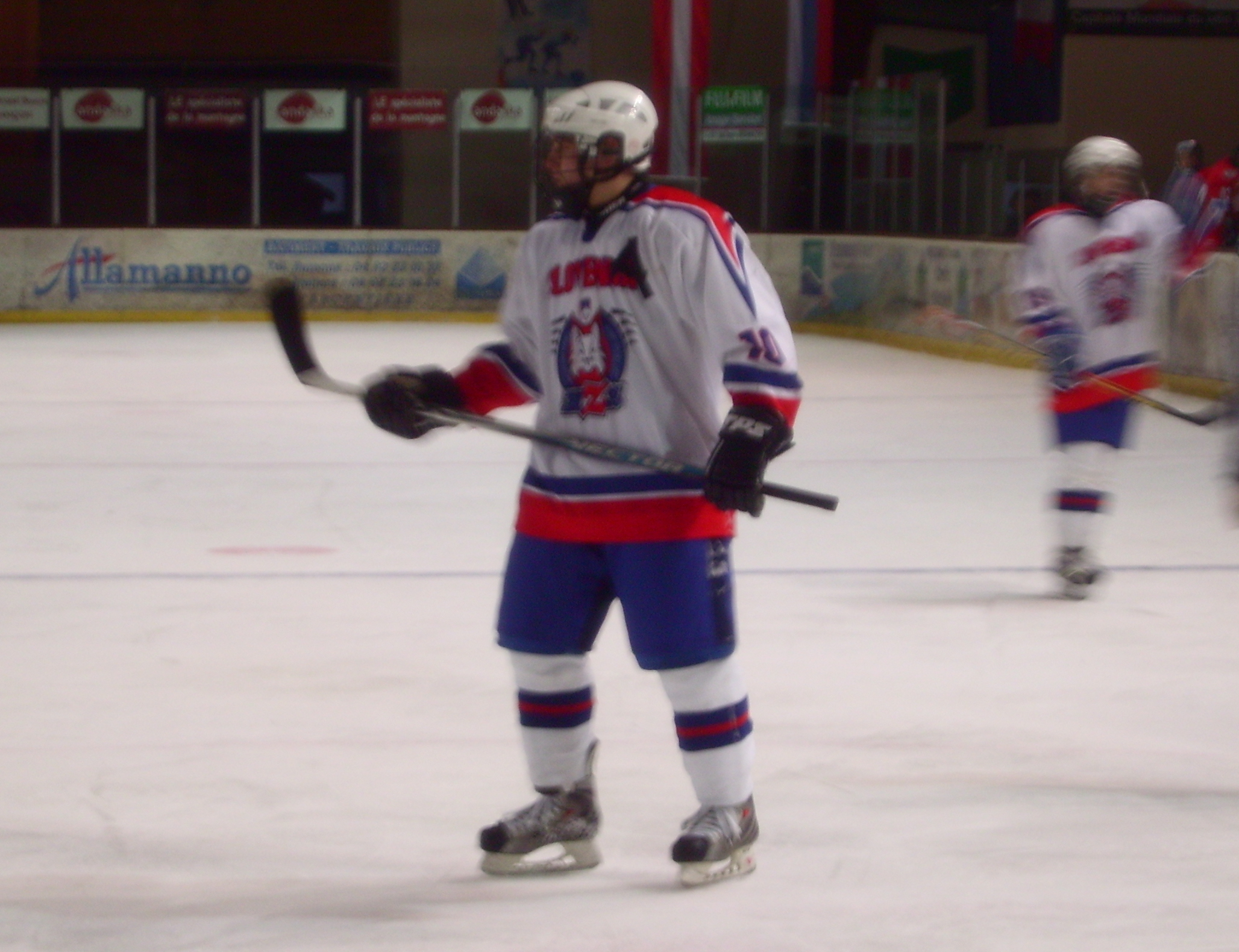
- Born: October 31, 1991 (age 35) Kranj, Slovenia
- Height: 5 ft 9 in (175 cm)
- Weight: 176 lb (80 kg; 12 st 8 lb)
- Position: Left wing
- Shoots: Right
- ICEHL team Former teams: Fehérvár AV19; HK Acroni Jesenice; Herning Blue Fox; Dauphins d'Épinal; Graz 99ers Brûleurs de Loups; Gothiques d'Amiens
- National team: Slovenia
- Playing career: 2009–present

Anže Kuralt (born October 31, 1991) is a Slovenian professional ice hockey player who is a left winger for Fehérvár AV19 of the ICE Hockey League (ICEHL).

On January 6, 2014, Kuralt was named to Slovenia's roster for the 2014 Winter Olympics roster.

== Career statistics ==
=== Regular season and playoffs ===
			Regular season					Playoffs
Season	Team	League	GP	G	A	Pts	PIM	GP	G	A	Pts	PIM
2006–07	HK Triglav Kranj	SVN U20	4	1	1	2	2	2	0	0	0	0
2007–08	HK Triglav Kranj	SVN U19	22	14	6	20	40	2	0	0	0	4
2008–09	HK Triglav Kranj	SVN U19	26	22	28	50	98	4	1	5	6	14
2009–10	EC Red Bull Salzburg	AUT U20	20	18	17	35	44	6	3	1	4	12
2010–11	HK Jesenice	AUT	51	3	7	10	18	—	—	—	—	—
2010–11	HK Jesenice	SVN	4	2	1	3	2	4	1	0	1	10
2010–11	HK Triglav Kranj	Slohokej	6	3	1	4	4	—	—	—	—	—
2011–12	HK Jesenice	AUT	37	7	4	11	22	—	—	—	—	—
2011–12	HK Jesenice	SVN	—	—	—	—	—	6	5	3	8	39
2011–12	HK Triglav Kranj	Slohokej	2	0	0	0	0	—	—	—	—	—
2012–13	HK Triglav Kranj	INL	20	15	11	26	51	1	0	0	0	0
2012–13	Herning Blue Fox	DEN	6	4	5	9	4	6	0	1	1	8
2013–14	Dauphins d'Épinal	FRA	24	18	21	39	18	1	1	1	2	0
2013–14	Graz99ers	AUT	3	1	0	1	0	—	—	—	—	—
2014–15	Gamyo d'Épinal	FRA	22	13	8	21	44	16	5	4	9	39
2015–16	Gamyo d'Épinal	FRA	26	11	16	27	22	12	8	3	11	20
2016–17	Brûleurs de Loups	FRA	44	13	14	27	28	12	2	2	4	2
2017–18	Gothiques d'Amiens	FRA	41	17	17	34	16	12	4	1	5	26
2018–19	Fehérvár AV19	AUT	37	16	19	35	24	—	—	—	—	—
2019–20	Fehérvár AV19	AUT	50	9	18	27	24	—	—	—	—	—
2020–21	Fehérvár AV19	ICEHL	47	17	18	35	24	4	0	0	0	0
2021–22	Fehérvár AV19	ICEHL	47	19	24	43	23	13	2	14	16	4
AUT totals			272	72	90	162	135	17	2	14	16	4
FRA totals			157	72	76	148	128	53	20	11	31	87

=== International ===
Year	Team	Event	GP	G	A	Pts	PIM
2008	Slovenia	WJC18 D1	5	0	1	1	0
2008	Slovenia	WJC18 D2	5	7	7	14	12
2010	Slovenia	WJC D1	4	1	0	1	31
2011	Slovenia	WJC D1	5	1	4	5	40
2014	Slovenia	OG	—	—	—	—	—
2014	Slovenia	WC D1A	5	1	3	4	0
2016	Slovenia	WC D1A	5	1	3	4	6
2016	Slovenia	OGQ	3	0	1	1	0
2017	Slovenia	WC	7	1	0	1	2
2018	Slovenia	OG	4	1	2	3	2
2018	Slovenia	WC D1A	5	0	1	1	2
2019	Slovenia	WC D1A	5	2	1	3	2
2020	Slovenia	OGQ	3	1	2	3	0
2021	Slovenia	OGQ	3	0	0	0	4
2022	Slovenia	WC D1A	4	1	2	3	6
2023	Slovenia	WC	7	3	0	3	2
2024	Slovenia	WC D1A	5	1	0	1	2
2024	Slovenia	OGQ	3	1	0	1	2
2026	Slovenia	WC	7	1	0	1	2
Junior totals			19	9	12	21	83
Senior totals			66	14	15	29	32
