= Blaž Gregorc =

Slovenian ice hockey player (born 1990)

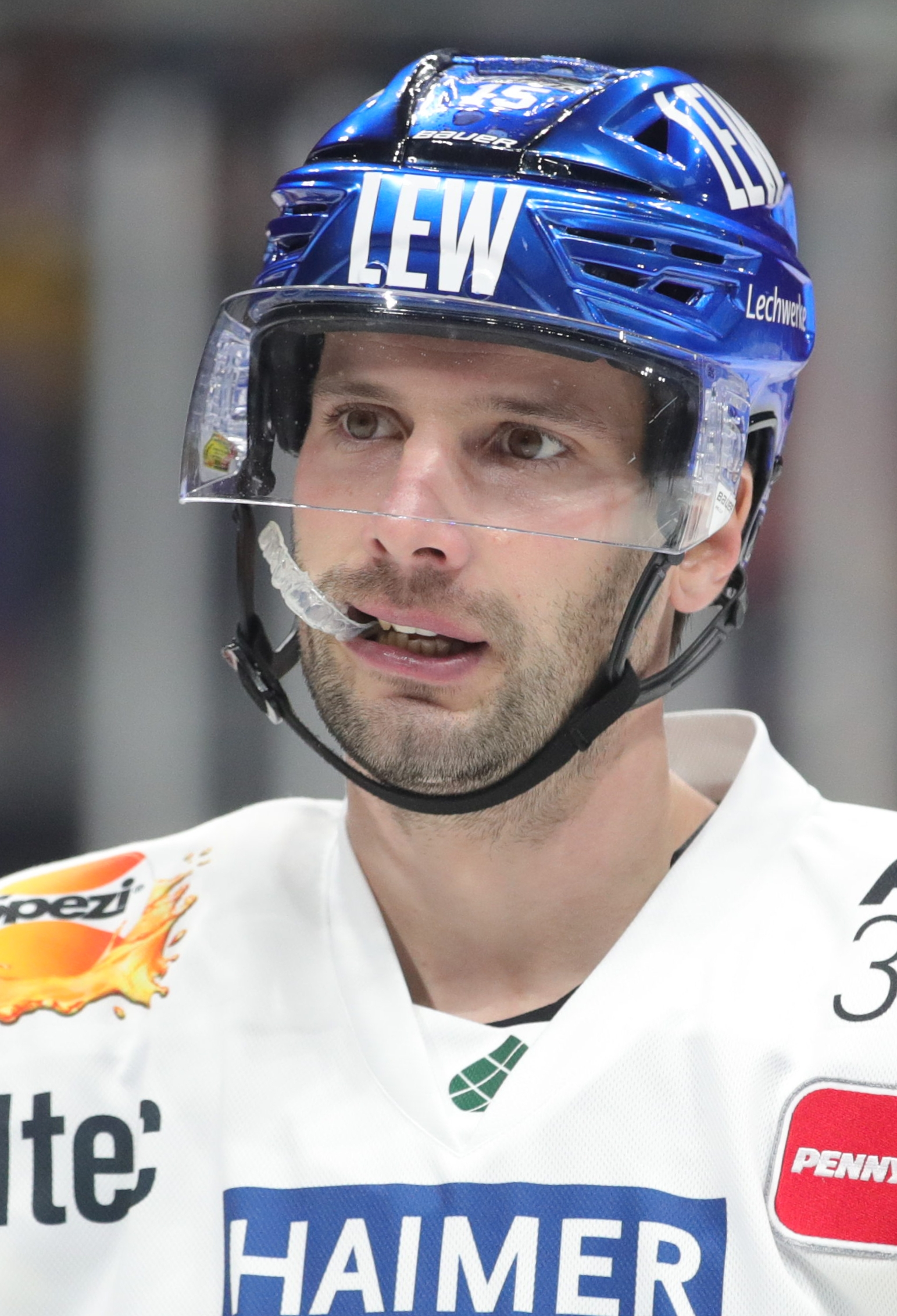
- Gregorc in 2023
- Born: January 18, 1990 (age 36) Jesenice, Yugoslavia
- Height: 6 ft 3 in (191 cm)
- Weight: 207 lb (94 kg; 14 st 11 lb)
- Position: Defence
- Shoots: Left
- ICEHL team Former teams: HK Olimpija; Södertälje SK; HC Dynamo Pardubice; Mountfield HK; HC Sparta Praha; HC Vítkovice; EC KAC; Black Wings Linz; Augsburger Panther; Graz99ers; Fischtown Pinguins
- National team: Slovenia
- Playing career: 2006–present

Blaž Gregorc (born 18 January 1990) is a Slovenian professional ice hockey player who is a defenceman for HK Olimpija of the ICE Hockey League (ICEHL).

Gregorc participated in the 2011 IIHF World Championship as a member of the Slovenia national team. In the 2022–23 season, his second with Augsburger Panther, he provided one goal and nine points through 32 regular season matches, but could not help prevent the Panthers from finishing in a relegation position. Gregorc left the club after his contract expired on 17 March 2023.

== Career statistics ==
=== Regular season and playoffs ===
			Regular season					Playoffs
Season	Team	League	GP	G	A	Pts	PIM	GP	G	A	Pts	PIM
2004–05	HKMK Bled	SVN U20	19	0	3	3	0	—	—	—	—	—
2005–06	HKMK Bled	SVN U20
2005–06	HKMK Bled	AUT.4
2006–07	HKMK Bled	SVN U20	18	8	14	22	10	5	0	3	3	4
2006–07	HKMK Bled	AUT.4	22	7	3	10	6	—	—	—	—	—
2006–07	HK Triglav Kranj	SVN	3	0	0	0	0	—	—	—	—	—
2007–08	Södertälje SK	J18	3	2	2	4	0	—	—	—	—	—
2007–08	Södertälje SK	J18 Allsv	7	0	3	3	0	2	0	1	1	2
2007–08	Södertälje SK	J20	34	6	6	12	10	—	—	—	—	—
2008–09	Södertälje SK	J20	39	9	14	23	30	2	0	1	1	2
2009–10	Södertälje SK	J20	22	3	6	9	12	—	—	—	—	—
2009–10	Södertälje SK	SEL	30	0	3	3	10	—	—	—	—	—
2009–10	Nyköpings HK	SWE.3	7	4	4	8	0	—	—	—	—	—
2010–11	Södertälje SK	J20	9	5	3	8	4	—	—	—	—	—
2010–11	Södertälje SK	SEL	21	0	1	1	2	—	—	—	—	—
2010–11	Växjö Lakers	Allsv	16	2	2	4	2	—	—	—	—	—
2011–12	Södertälje SK	Allsv	42	3	6	9	20	—	—	—	—	—
2012–13	Odense Bulldogs	DEN	40	6	17	23	16	14	0	4	4	6
2013–14	HC ČSOB Pojišťovna Pardubice	ELH	50	1	13	14	38	10	0	2	2	2
2014–15	HC ČSOB Pojišťovna Pardubice	ELH	52	6	13	19	22	5	0	3	3	6
2015–16	HC Dynamo Pardubice	ELH	44	6	10	16	20	—	—	—	—	—
2016–17	Mountfield HK, a.s.	ELH	52	4	15	19	24	11	1	4	5	4
2017–18	Mountfield HK, a.s.	ELH	52	4	16	20	20	13	0	5	5	4
2018–19	HC Sparta Praha	ELH	20	0	3	3	12	—	—	—	—	—
2018–19	HC Vítkovice Ridera	ELH	28	1	8	9	14	1	0	0	0	0
2019–20	HC Vítkovice Ridera	ELH	31	2	5	7	6	—	—	—	—	—
2020–21	EC KAC	ICEHL	41	1	13	14	14	15	4	5	9	8
2021–22	Steinbach Black Wings 1992	ICEHL	48	3	12	15	16	—	—	—	—	—
2021–22	Augsburger Panther	DEL	10	1	5	6	4	—	—	—	—	—
2022–23	Augsburger Panther	DEL	32	1	8	9	6	—	—	—	—	—
2023–24	Graz99ers	ICEHL	38	2	7	9	10	—	—	—	—	—
2023–24	Fischtown Pinguins	DEL	2	1	1	2	2	6	0	0	0	4
2024–25	HK Olimpija	ICEHL	47	3	13	16	14	1	0	0	0	2
2024–25	HK Olimpija	ICEHL	46	2	12	14	14	10	0	3	3	4
SEL totals			51	0	4	4	12	—	—	—	—	—
ELH totals			329	24	83	107	156	40	1	14	15	16

=== International ===
Year	Team	Event	GP	G	A	Pts	PIM
2006	Slovenia	WJC18 D1	5	1	1	2	2
2007	Slovenia	WJC18 D1	5	1	4	5	6
2008	Slovenia	WJC D1	5	0	0	0	2
2008	Slovenia	WJC18 D1	5	1	1	2	0
2009	Slovenia	WJC D1	5	2	2	4	4
2010	Slovenia	WJC D1	5	0	0	0	4
2011	Slovenia	WC	6	0	2	2	4
2012	Slovenia	WC D1A	5	1	3	4	0
2013	Slovenia	OGQ	3	0	1	1	0
2013	Slovenia	WC	7	0	3	3	2
2014	Slovenia	OG	5	0	0	0	2
2014	Slovenia	WC D1A	5	0	2	2	4
2015	Slovenia	WC	7	0	0	0	0
2016	Slovenia	WC D1A	5	0	0	0	0
2016	Slovenia	OGQ	3	0	2	2	0
2017	Slovenia	WC	7	0	0	0	4
2018	Slovenia	OG	4	1	3	4	0
2018	Slovenia	WC D1A	5	1	1	2	2
2019	Slovenia	WC D1A	5	0	1	1	2
2020	Slovenia	OGQ	3	1	5	6	0
2021	Slovenia	OGQ	3	1	3	4	0
2022	Slovenia	WC D1A	4	0	3	3	0
2023	Slovenia	WC	7	0	3	3	4
2024	Slovenia	OGQ	3	0	3	3	0
2025	Slovenia	WC	7	2	0	2	2
2026	Slovenia	WC	7	0	3	3	2
Junior totals			30	5	8	13	18
Senior totals			101	7	38	45	28
