= Drago Mlinarec =

Drago Mlinarec may refer to:

- Drago Mlinarec (ice hockey) (born 1960), Slovenian international hockey player
- Drago Mlinarec (musician) (born 1942), Croatian pop/rock scriptwriter and composer
