= 2022 IIHF World Championship Division I =

International ice hockey tournament

Tournament details
- Host countries: Slovenia; Poland
- Venues: 2 (in 2 host cities)
- Dates: 3–8 May; 26 April – 1 May
- Teams: 10

The 2022 IIHF World Championship Division I was an international ice hockey tournament run by the International Ice Hockey Federation.

The Group A tournament was held in Ljubljana, Slovenia from 3 to 8 May and the Group B tournament in Tychy, Poland from 26 April to 1 May 2022.

After the tournament was cancelled the two previous years due to the COVID-19 pandemic, all teams were set to remain in their groups for the 2022 edition. However, France and Austria, who were relegated to Division IA in 2019, were called back up to the top division to replace Russia and Belarus, who were suspended by the IIHF. Lithuania, who were relegated to Division IB in 2019, were called back up to Division IA so that there would be an equal number of teams in each group.

Slovenia got promoted to the Top Division by winning the Group A tournament alongside Hungary. Poland won the Group B tournament and got promoted. Following the tournament, the IIHF decided not to relegate Romania or Serbia, who finished last in groups A and B respectively, in order for the division to fill up to its normal number of twelve teams (six in each group).

== Group A tournament ==
2022 IIHF World Championship Division I A

Tournament details
- Host country: Slovenia
- Venue: 1 (in 1 host city)
- Dates: 3–8 May
- Teams: 5

Tournament statistics
- Games played: 10
- Goals scored: 64 (6.4 per game)
- Attendance: 20,700 (2,070 per game)
- Scoring leader: (Slovenia) Žiga Jeglič (7 points)

Awards
- MVP: (Slovenia) Žiga Jeglič

Official website
- Website

=== Participants ===
Team	Qualification
South Korea	Placed 3rd in Division I A in 2019.
Slovenia	Host, placed 4th in Division I A in 2019.
Hungary	Placed 5th in Division I A in 2019.
Lithuania	Placed 6th in Division I A in 2019.
Romania	Placed 1st in Division I B in 2019 and was promoted.

=== Standings ===
Pos	Team	Pld	W	OTW	OTL	L	GF	GA	GD	Pts	Promotion
1	Slovenia (H, P)	4	4	0	0	0	22	5	+17	12	Promoted to the 2023 Top Division
2	Hungary (P)	4	3	0	0	1	12	9	+3	9	Promoted to the 2023 Top Division
3	Lithuania	4	2	0	0	2	13	13	0	6	
4	South Korea	4	1	0	0	3	9	15	−6	3	
5	Romania	4	0	0	0	4	8	22	−14	0	

Source: IIHF
Rules for classification: 1) points; 2) head-to-head points; 3) head-to-head goal difference; 4) head-to-head number of goals scored; 5) result against closest best-ranked team outside tied teams; 6) result against second-best ranked team outside tied teams; 7) seeding before tournament.
(H) Host; (P) Promoted

=== Results ===
All times are local (UTC+2)

3 May 2022; 15:30	Hungary	5–1 (2–0, 3–0, 0–1)	South Korea	Tivoli Hall, Ljubljana; Attendance: 1,500

Game reference

Miklós Rajna
Goalies
Matt Dalton
Referees:
(Sweden) Mikael Holm
(United Kingdom) Liam Sewell
Linesmen:
(Netherlands) Joep Leermakers
(Slovenia) Gašper Zgonc

Fejes (Papp, Nagy) – 06:19	1–0
Sofron (Garát, Erdély) – 07:42	2–0
Erdély (Sofron) – 23:19	3–0
Erdély (Terbócs, Hári) (PP) – 27:38	4–0
Erdély (Szirányi, Hári) – 30:27	5–0
	5–1	57:49 – Kim S. (Kim W., Ahn)

8 min
Penalties
4 min
23
Shots
20

3 May 2022; 19:00	Slovenia	4–2 (1–0, 2–0, 1–2)	Lithuania	Tivoli Hall, Ljubljana; Attendance: 2,500

Game reference

Matija Pintarič
Goalies
Mantas Armalis
Referees:
(Austria) Christoph Sternat
(United States) Andrew Wilk
Linesmen:
(Hungary) Barna Kis-Király
(Belgium) Frederic Monnaie

Verlič (Jeglič, Urbas) – 13:44	1–0
Kuralt (Podlipnik, Tičar) – 21:07	2–0
Tomaževič (Koblar, Maver) – 29:53	3–0
Koblar (Maver, Podlipnik) – 52:59	4–0
	4–1	55:18 – Bendžius (Bosas) (PP)
	4–2	59:51 – Krakauskas (Kumeliauskas)

6 min
Penalties
6 min
48
Shots
20

4 May 2022; 15:30	Lithuania	1–2 (0–1, 1–1, 0–0)	Hungary	Tivoli Hall, Ljubljana; Attendance: 1,500

Game reference

Mantas Armalis
Goalies
Miklós Rajna
Referees:
(Austria) Christoph Sternat
(Slovenia) Milan Zrnić
Linesmen:
(Austria) David Nothegger
(South Korea) Park Jun-soo

	0–1	00:51 – Sebők (Kulmala)
	0–2	23:38 – Hári (PS)
Ališauskas (Krakauskas, Čižas) – 27:03	1–2

10 min
Penalties
10 min
34
Shots
45

4 May 2022; 19:00	Romania	1–9 (1–1, 0–6, 0–2)	Slovenia	Tivoli Hall, Ljubljana; Attendance: 2,000

Game reference

Patrik Polc
Zoltán Tőke
Goalies
Gašper Krošelj
Matija Pintarič
Referees:
(Sweden) Mikael Holm
(Croatia) Trpimir Piragić
Linesmen:
(Hungary) Barna Kis-Király
(Netherlands) Joep Leermakers

	0–1	09:00 – Jeglič (Ograjenšek, Urbas) (PP)
Skachkov (Péter, Borysenko) (PP) – 11:01	1–1
	1–2	23:02 – Verlič (Urbas, Jeglič)
	1–3	24:18 – Jeglič (Urbas, Pretnar)
	1–4	32:56 – Ograjenšek (Jeglič, Gregorc) (PP)
	1–5	35:33 – Maver (Tomaževič, Gregorc)
	1–6	39:03 – Verlič (Urbas, Jeglič)
	1–7	40:00 – Čimžar (Ograjenšek)
	1–8	44:00 – Tičar (PS)
	1–9	50:19 – Verlič (Pretnar, Urbas)

4 min
Penalties
2 min
15
Shots
45

5 May 2022; 15:30	Romania	1–4 (0–0, 1–2, 0–2)	South Korea	Tivoli Hall, Ljubljana; Attendance: 1,000

Game reference

Zoltán Tőke
Goalies
Matt Dalton
Referees:
(United Kingdom) Liam Sewell
(United States) Andrew Wilk
Linesmen:
(Belgium) Frederic Monnaie
(South Korea) Park Jun-soo

	0–1	21:41 – Kim W. (Jeon) (PP)
	0–2	25:48 – Jeon (Kim W., Kang Y.)
Zagidullin (Skachkov, Borysenko) (PP) – 38:53	1–2
	1–3	45:46 – Kang M. (Lee M., Jeon)
	1–4	58:36 – Jeon (Kang Y.) (EN)

4 min
Penalties
12 min
29
Shots
30

6 May 2022; 15:30	South Korea	3–5 (1–2, 1–1, 1–2)	Lithuania	Tivoli Hall, Ljubljana; Attendance: 500

Game reference

Matt Dalton
Goalies
Mantas Armalis
Referees:
(United States) Andrew Wilk
(Slovenia) Milan Zrnić
Linesmen:
(Belgium) Frederic Monnaie
(Slovenia) Gašper Zgonc

	0–1	10:35 – Bosas (Jasinevičius, Čižas) (PP)
Jeon (Lee C., Kim W.) (PP) – 12:12	1–1
	1–2	16:54 – Krakauskas (PS)
Lee C. (Shin, Kim S.) (PP2) – 28:56	2–2
	2–3	39:32 – Krakauskas (Noreika, Grinius) (PP)
	2–4	52:34 – Noreika (Grinius, Krakauskas) (PP)
	2–5	57:11 – Čižas (Ališauskas) (SH, EN)
Lee Jo. (Shin, Kim W.) (PP) – 58:19	3–5

14 min
Penalties
8 min
26
Shots
40

6 May 2022; 19:00	Slovenia	5–1 (1–1, 2–0, 2–0)	Hungary	Tivoli Hall, Ljubljana; Attendance: 4,200

Game reference

Gašper Krošelj
Goalies
Miklós Rajna
Referees:
(Sweden) Mikael Holm
(Croatia) Trpimir Piragić
Linesmen:
(Netherlands) Joep Leermakers
(Austria) David Nothegger

Jeglič (Urbas, Gregorc) – 00:31	1–0
	1–1	15:06 – Erdély (Terbócs, Nagy)
Sabolič (Tičar, Robar) – 26:45	2–1
Pance – 26:50	3–1
Sabolič (Maver) (PP) – 57:20	4–1
Ograjenšek (Verlič) (PP) – 57:29	5–1

4 min
Penalties
14 min
40
Shots
18

7 May 2022; 15:30	Lithuania	5–4 (0–2, 3–1, 2–1)	Romania	Tivoli Hall, Ljubljana; Attendance: 1,000

Game reference

Mantas Armalis
Goalies
Patrik Polc
Referees:
(Austria) Christoph Sternat
(Slovenia) Milan Zrnić
Linesmen:
(Hungary) Barna Kis-Király
(Slovenia) Gašper Zgonc

	0–1	03:49 – Skachkov (Bors, Zagidullin)
	0–2	10:59 – Részegh (Péter, Ferencz-Csibi) (SH)
Noreika – 31:10	1–2
Jasinevičius (Kumeliauskas) – 33:40	2–2
	2–3	36:47 – Molnár (Részegh) (PP)
Kumeliauskas (Čižas, Gintautas) (PP) – 38:14	3–3
Krakauskas (Kaleinikovas, Gusevas) – 43:35	4–3
Gintautas (Četvertak) – 45:24	5–3
	5–4	50:07 – S. Rokaly (Részegh, Yemelianenko)

8 min
Penalties
12 min
34
Shots
21

8 May 2022; 15:30	Hungary	4–2 (2–0, 1–2, 1–0)	Romania	Tivoli Hall, Ljubljana; Attendance: 2,500

Game reference

Miklós Rajna
Goalies
Zoltán Tőke
Referees:
(Croatia) Trpimir Piragić
(United Kingdom) Liam Sewell
Linesmen:
(South Korea) Park Jun-soo
(Slovenia) Gašper Zgonc

Nagy (Szirányi, Terbócs) – 08:26	1–0
Magosi (Sebők) – 12:47	2–0
	2–1	20:30 – Gliga (Skachkov, Farkas)
	2–2	27:49 – Ferencz-Csibi (Zagidullin, Skachkov)
Kulmala (Magosi, Pozsgai) – 29:05	3–2
Sofron (Hári, Fejes) (PP) – 56:59	4–2

4 min
Penalties
10 min
32
Shots
19

8 May 2022; 19:00	South Korea	1–4 (0–2, 0–1, 1–1)	Slovenia	Tivoli Hall, Ljubljana; Attendance: 4,000

Game reference

Matt Dalton
Goalies
Gašper Krošelj
Referees:
(Austria) Christoph Sternat
(United States) Andrew Wilk
Linesmen:
(Belgium) Frederic Monnaie
(Austria) David Nothegger

	0–1	05:54 – Robar (Tičar, Maver) (PP)
	0–2	11:26 – Sabolič (Tičar, Kuralt) (PP)
	0–3	35:35 – Sabolič (Tičar, Kuralt)
	0–4	50:52 – Tičar
Lee Jo. (Song, Lee C.) – 55:23	1–4

12 min
Penalties
6 min
13
Shots
29

=== Statistics ===
==== Scoring leaders ====
List shows the top skaters sorted by points, then goals.

Player	GP	G	A	Pts	+/−	PIM	POS
(Slovenia) Žiga Jeglič	4	3	4	7	+5	2	F
(Slovenia) Jan Urbas	4	0	7	7	+5	0	F
(Lithuania) Emilijus Krakauskas	4	4	2	6	0	0	F
(Slovenia) Rok Tičar	4	2	4	6	+5	0	F
(Hungary) Csanád Erdély	4	4	1	5	0	6	F
(Slovenia) Robert Sabolič	4	4	1	5	+4	2	F
(Slovenia) Miha Verlič	4	4	1	5	+6	0	F
(South Korea) Jeon Jung-woo	4	3	2	5	+1	0	F
(Romania) Evgeny Skachkov	4	2	3	5	−3	6	F
(South Korea) Kim Won-jun	4	1	4	5	+3	6	D
(Slovenia) Luka Maver	4	1	4	5	+1	0	F

GP = Games played; G = Goals; A = Assists; Pts = Points; +/− = Plus/Minus; PIM = Penalties in Minutes; POS = Position
Source: IIHF.com

==== Goaltending leaders ====
Only the top five goaltenders, based on save percentage, who have played at least 40% of their team's minutes, are included in this list.

Player	TOI	GA	GAA	SA	Sv%	SO
(Slovenia) Gašper Krošelj	160:00	3	1.13	43	93.02	0
(Hungary) Miklós Rajna	240:00	9	2.25	113	92.04	0
(Lithuania) Mantas Armalis	239:09	13	3.26	140	90.71	0
(South Korea) Matt Dalton	239:38	14	3.51	120	88.33	0
(Romania) Zoltán Tőke	139:49	9	3.86	70	87.14	0

TOI = time on ice (minutes:seconds); SA = shots against; GA = goals against; GAA = goals against average; Sv% = save percentage; SO = shutouts
Source: IIHF.com

=== Awards ===
Media All-stars

Position	Player
Goaltender	(Slovenia) Gašper Krošelj
Defenceman	(Lithuania) Nerijus Ališauskas (South Korea) Kim Won-jun
Forward	(Slovenia) Žiga Jeglič (Hungary) Csanád Erdély (Slovenia) Miha Verlič

Best Players Selected by the Directorate

Position	Player
Goaltender	(Lithuania) Mantas Armalis
Defenceman	(Hungary) Nándor Fejes
Forward	(Slovenia) Žiga Jeglič

== Group B tournament ==
2022 IIHF World Championship Division I B

Tournament details
- Host country: Poland
- Venue: 1 (in 1 host city)
- Dates: 26 April – 1 May
- Teams: 5

Tournament statistics
- Games played: 10
- Goals scored: 73 (7.3 per game)
- Attendance: 7,975 (798 per game)
- Scoring leader: (Japan) Yushiroh Hirano (10 points)

Official website
- Website

=== Participants ===
Team	Qualification
Poland	Host, placed 2nd in Division I B in 2019.
Japan	Placed 3rd in Division I B in 2019.
Estonia	Placed 4th in Division I B in 2019.
Ukraine	Placed 5th in Division I B in 2019.
Serbia	Placed 1st in Division II A in 2019 and was promoted.

=== Match officials ===
Six referees and six linesmen were selected for the tournament.

Referees	Linesmen
(France) Geoffrey Barcelo; (Hungary) Daniel Rencz; (Italy) Turo Virta; (Poland) Michał Baca; (Switzerland) Stefan Hurlimann; (Ukraine) Andrii Kicha	(Latvia) Agris Ozoliņš; (Poland) Mateusz Bucki; (Poland) Rafał Noworyta; (Slovakia) Daniel Konc; (Slovenia) Gregor Miklič; (Ukraine) Serhii Kharaberyush

=== Standings ===
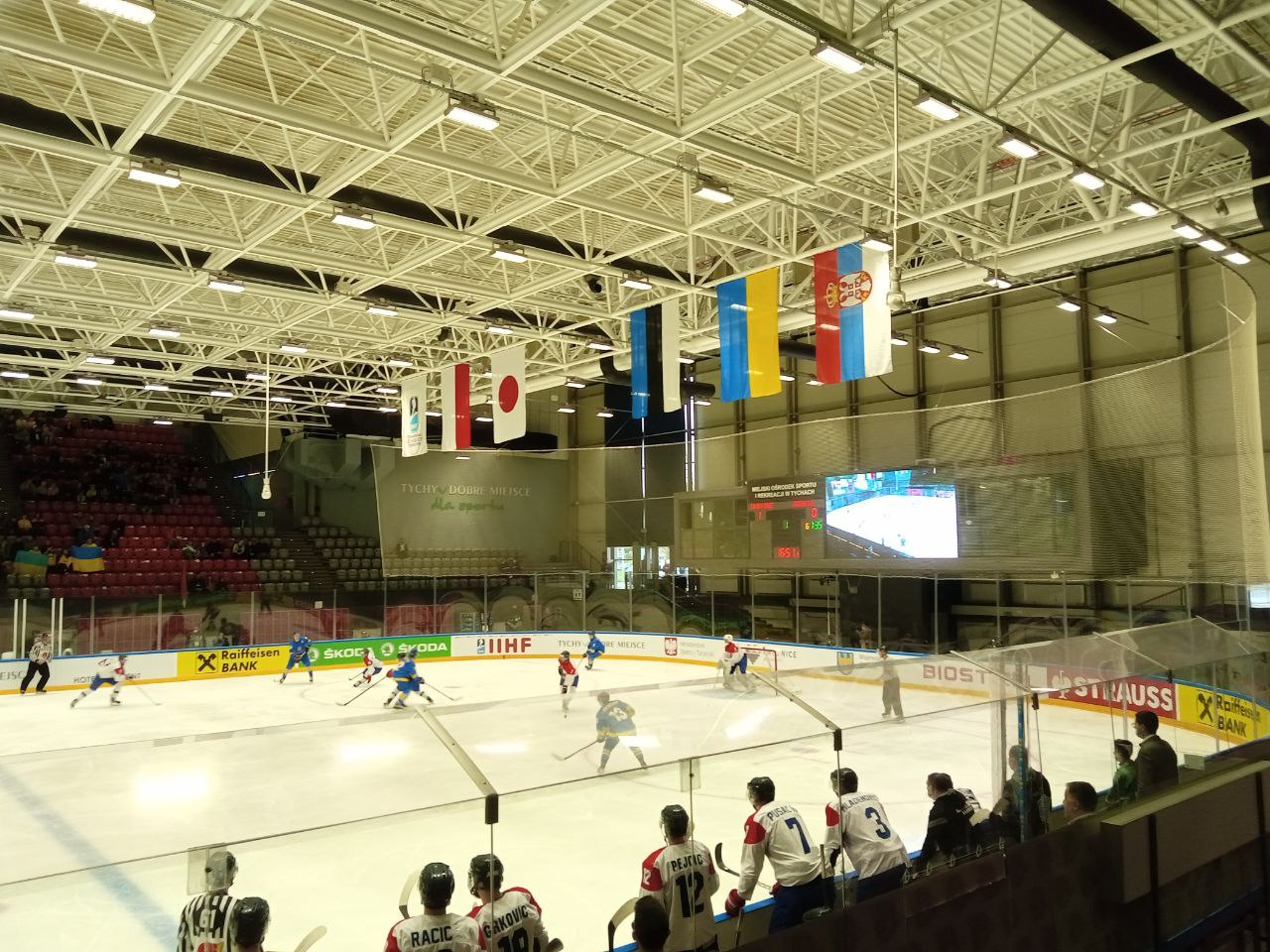
Ukraine against Serbia

Pos	Team	Pld	W	OTW	OTL	L	GF	GA	GD	Pts	Promotion
1	Poland (H, P)	4	3	1	0	0	18	4	+14	11	Promoted to the 2023 Division I A
2	Japan	4	3	0	0	1	23	9	+14	9	
3	Ukraine	4	2	0	1	1	19	11	+8	7	
4	Estonia	4	1	0	0	3	9	20	−11	3	
5	Serbia	4	0	0	0	4	4	29	−25	0	

Source: IIHF
Rules for classification: 1) points; 2) head-to-head points; 3) head-to-head goal difference; 4) head-to-head number of goals scored; 5) result against closest best-ranked team outside tied teams; 6) result against second-best ranked team outside tied teams; 7) seeding before tournament.
(H) Host; (P) Promoted

=== Results ===
All times are local (UTC+2)

26 April 2022; 16:30	Serbia	0–8 (0–2, 0–5, 0–1)	Japan	Stadion Zimowy, Tychy; Attendance: 158

Game reference

Arsenije Ranković
Goalies
Yuta Narisawa
Referees:
(Poland) Michał Baca
(Hungary) Daniel Rencz
Linesmen:
(Ukraine) Sergii Kharaberyush
(Poland) Rafał Noworyta

0–1	05:13 – Nakayashiki (Minoshima, Suzuki) (PP)
0–2	06:00 – Furuhashi (Miura, Sato)
0–3	24:28 – Hirano (Nakajima, Osawa) (PP)
0–4	29:54 – Hirano (Denis, Hitosato) (PP)
0–5	30:06 – Furuhashi
0–6	37:47 – Irikura (Sato, Denis)
0–7	38:43 – Hirano (Nakajima, Minoshima)
0–8	49:44 – Suzuki (Miura, Furuhashi)

6 min
Penalties
6 min
16
Shots
53

26 April 2022; 20:00	Poland	3–0 (1–0, 1–0, 1–0)	Estonia	Stadion Zimowy, Tychy; Attendance: 808

Game reference

John Murray
Goalies
Villem-Henrik Koitmaa
Referees:
(Switzerland) Stefan Hurlimann
(Ukraine) Andrii Kicha
Linesmen:
(Slovakia) Daniel Konc
(Latvia) Agris Ozoliņš

Wałęga – 12:54	1–0
Zygmunt (Wronka, Paś) – 29:51	2–0
Komorski (Wajda, Jeziorski) – 45:53	3–0

10 min
Penalties
4 min
27
Shots
36

27 April 2022; 16:30	Ukraine	7–0 (2–0, 3–0, 2–0)	Serbia	Stadion Zimowy, Tychy; Attendance: 328

Game reference

Dmytro Kubrytsky
Goalies
Arsenije Ranković
Referees:
(France) Geoffrey Barcelo
(Italy) Turo Virta
Linesmen:
(Poland) Mateusz Bucki
(Slovenia) Gregor Miklič

Peresunko (Mikhnov, Blagoy) (PP) – 01:24	1–0
Peresunko (Mikhnov, Pangelov-Yuldashev) – 10:51	2–0
Mazur (Matusevych, Mikhnov) – 23:30	3–0
Mazur (Pangelov-Yuldashev, Mikhnov) (PP) – 29:00	4–0
Nimenko (Blagoy, Andreykiv) – 33:10	5–0
Morozov (Vorona, Andreykiv) (SH) – 48:24	6–0
Lyalka (Fadyeyev, Korenchuk) – 50:39	7–0

6 min
Penalties
12 min
52
Shots
13

28 April 2022; 16:30	Japan	7–5 (4–2, 1–3, 2–0)	Estonia	Stadion Zimowy, Tychy; Attendance: 264

Game reference

Yuta Narisawa
Goalies
Villem-Henrik Koitmaa
Referees:
(Poland) Michał Baca
(Switzerland) Stefan Hurlimann
Linesmen:
(Poland) Mateusz Bucki
(Poland) Rafał Noworyta

K. Otsu (Ishida) – 03:19	1–0
	1–1	06:04 – Vasjonkin (Sibirtsev, Ossipov)
Halliday (Hitosato, Nakajima) – 09:44	2–1
Hitosato (Hirano, Nakajima) – 12:47	3–1
Irikura (Kimura) – 14:08	4–1
	4–2	19:49 – Rooba (Kombe, Kulintsev)
	4–3	20:42 – Rooba (Slessarevski, Kombe)
Y. Otsu (Hirano, Hitosato) – 26:43	5–3
	5–4	28:28 – Kerna
	5–5	36:54 – Rooba (Arrak)
Hirano (Nakajima, Y. Otsu) – 45:45	6–5
Hirano – 55:07	7–5

6 min
Penalties
6 min
40
Shots
29

28 April 2022; 20:00	Ukraine	2–3 GWS (1–2, 0–0, 1–0) (OT: 0–0) (SO: 0–1)	Poland	Stadion Zimowy, Tychy; Attendance: 1,930

Game reference

Sergi Pysarenko
Goalies
John Murray
Referees:
(Hungary) Daniel Rencz
(Italy) Turo Virta
Linesmen:
(Slovenia) Gregor Miklič
(Latvia) Agris Ozoliņš

	0–1	12:01 – Paś (Zygmunt, Bryk)
Fadyeyev (Merezhko, Lyalka) (PP2) – 15:15	1–1
	1–2	17:56 – Paś (Wronka, Ciura)
Simchuk – 44:38	2–2

Peresunko (miss)
Simchuk (miss)
Lyalka (miss)
Blagy
Mikhnov (miss)
Shootout
Komorski
(miss) Wałęga
Bukowski
(miss) Łyszczarczyk
10 min
Penalties
10 min
33
Shots
31

29 April 2022; 20:00	Serbia	2–10 (1–3, 0–3, 1–4)	Poland	Stadion Zimowy, Tychy; Attendance: 1,420

Game reference

Arsenije Ranković
Neil Beaton
Goalies
David Zabolotny
Referees:
(France) Geoffrey Barcelo
(Ukraine) Andrii Kicha
Linesmen:
(Ukraine) Sergii Kharaberyush
(Slovakia) Daniel Konc

	0–1	01:34 – Łyszczarczyk (Komorski)
	0–2	06:44 – Paś (Wronka, Zygmunt)
Đumić (Dragović, Popović) – 11:16	1–2
	1–3	17:36 – Komorski (Wałęga, Łyszczarczyk) (PP)
	1–4	29:05 – Michalski (Gościński, Jaśkiewicz)
	1–5	36:03 – Dziubiński (Łyszczarczyk)
	1–6	38:44 – Komorski (Łyszczarczyk, Kruczek)
	1–7	42:39 – Komorski (Łyszczarczyk)
Đumić (Popović, Dragović) – 43:18	2–7
	2–8	51:31 – Dziubiński (Komorski, Łyszczarczyk)
	2–9	51:38 – Wałęga (Jeziorski, Bukowski)
	2–10	55:58 – Dziubiński (Łyszczarczyk)

12 min
Penalties
4 min
17
Shots
65

30 April 2022; 16:30	Japan	8–2 (3–0, 3–2, 2–0)	Ukraine	Stadion Zimowy, Tychy; Attendance: 350

Game reference

Yuta Narisawa
Goalies
Sergi Pysarenko
Dmytro Kubrytsky
Referees:
(France) Geoffrey Barcelo
(Switzerland) Stefan Hurlimann
Linesmen:
(Slovakia) Daniel Konc
(Poland) Rafał Noworyta

Furuhashi (Miura, Halliday) – 04:19	1–0
Minoshima – 04:52	2–0
Furuhashi – 09:08	3–0
Suzuki (Furuhashi, Minoshima) (PP) – 20:24	4–0
	4–1	25:06 – Lyalka (Merezhko, Korenchuk)
Nakayashiki – 31:42	5–1
	5–2	34:40 – Vorona (Andreykiv, Lytvynov)
Hitosato (Hirano) – 39:56	6–2
Hitosato (Hirano) – 44:09	7–2
Hirano (Nakajima, Hitosato) (PP) – 59:59	8–2

10 min
Penalties
20 min
29
Shots
30

30 April 2022; 20:00	Estonia	4–2 (2–1, 1–0, 1–1)	Serbia	Stadion Zimowy, Tychy; Attendance: 110

Game reference

Villem-Henrik Koitmaa
Goalies
Arsenije Ranković
Referees:
(Poland) Michał Baca
(Ukraine) Andrii Kicha
Linesmen:
(Poland) Mateusz Bucki
(Latvia) Agris Ozoliņš

Vasjonkin (Linde, Kerna) – 01:32	1–0
Kulintsev (Kombe, Arrak) – 05:30	2–0
	2–1	05:46 – Đumić (Dragović, Podunavac) (PP)
Rooba (Kulintsev, Lahesalu) – 28:08	3–1
Parras – 44:17	4–1
	4–2	57:32 – Đumić (Dragović, Popović)

6 min
Penalties
12 min
28
Shots
10

1 May 2022; 16:30	Poland	2–0 (0–0, 1–0, 1–0)	Japan	Stadion Zimowy, Tychy; Attendance: 2,422

Game reference
John Murray	Goalies	Yuta Narisawa	Referees: (Hungary) Daniel Rencz (Italy) Turo Virta; Linesmen: (Ukraine) Sergii Kharaberyush (Slovenia) Gregor Miklič
Kostek (Bryk, Łyszczarczyk) – 25:50 / 1–0; Łyszczarczyk – 58:24 / 2–0			Referees: (Hungary) Daniel Rencz (Italy) Turo Virta; Linesmen: (Ukraine) Sergii Kharaberyush (Slovenia) Gregor Miklič
8 min	Penalties	6 min	Referees: (Hungary) Daniel Rencz (Italy) Turo Virta; Linesmen: (Ukraine) Sergii Kharaberyush (Slovenia) Gregor Miklič
24	Shots	21	Referees: (Hungary) Daniel Rencz (Italy) Turo Virta; Linesmen: (Ukraine) Sergii Kharaberyush (Slovenia) Gregor Miklič

1 May 2022; 20:00	Estonia	0–8 (0–1, 0–4, 0–3)	Ukraine	Stadion Zimowy, Tychy; Attendance: 185

Game reference

Villem-Henrik Koitmaa
Henrik Virro
Goalies
Dmytro Kubrytsky
Referees:
(France) Geoffrey Barcelo
(Switzerland) Stefan Hurlimann
Linesmen:
(Slovakia) Daniel Konc
(Latvia) Agris Ozoliņš

0–1	12:53 – Merezhko (Lyalka, Fadyeyev)
0–2	26:48 – Simchuk (Vorona, Tolstushko)
0–3	28:30 – Peresunko (Mazur)
0–4	37:19 – Lyalka (Peresunko, Mikhnov) (PP)
0–5	39:17 – Peresunko (Mikhnov)
0–6	44:12 – Simchuk (Blagoy, Merezhko) (PP)
0–7	49:06 – Mazur (Pangelov-Yuldashev, Borodai)
0–8	59:24 – Fadyeyev (Merezhko, Simchuk) (PP)

12 min
Penalties
2 min
18
Shots
38

=== Statistics ===
==== Scoring leaders ====
List shows the top skaters sorted by points, then goals.

Player	GP	G	A	Pts	+/−	PIM	POS
(Japan) Yushiroh Hirano	4	6	4	10	+8	0	F
(Poland) Alan Łyszczarczyk	4	2	7	9	+9	2	F
(Japan) Shigeki Hitosato	4	3	4	7	+8	2	F
(Japan) Makuru Furuhashi	4	4	2	6	+4	2	F
(Poland) Filip Komorski	4	4	2	6	+7	0	F
(Ukraine) Andriy Mikhnov	4	0	6	6	+1	0	F
(Japan) Shogo Nakajima	4	0	6	6	+7	2	F
(Ukraine) Oleksandr Peresunko	4	4	1	5	+3	4	F
(Ukraine) Vitalii Lialka	4	3	2	5	+3	4	F
(Ukraine) Ihor Merezhko	4	1	4	5	+2	2	D

GP = Games played; G = Goals; A = Assists; Pts = Points; +/− = Plus/Minus; PIM = Penalties in Minutes; POS = Position
Source: IIHF.com

==== Goaltending leaders ====
Only the top five goaltenders, based on save percentage, who have played at least 40% of their team's minutes, are included in this list.

Player	TOI	GA	GAA	SA	Sv%	SO
(Ukraine) Dmytro Kubrytskyi	121:54	0	0.00	34	100.00	2
(Poland) John Murray	185:00	2	0.65	90	97.78	2
(Japan) Yuta Narisawa	238:39	9	2.26	99	90.91	1
(Serbia) Arsenije Ranković	235:04	29	7.40	195	85.13	0
(Estonia) Villem-Henrik Koitmaa	220:00	17	4.64	104	83.65	0

TOI = time on ice (minutes:seconds); SA = shots against; GA = goals against; GAA = goals against average; Sv% = save percentage; SO = shutouts
Source: IIHF.com

=== Awards ===
Position	Player
Goaltender	(Poland) John Murray
Defenceman	(Ukraine) Ihor Merezhko
Forward	(Japan) Yushiroh Hirano
