= Franc Smolej =

Franc Smolej may refer to:

- Franc Smolej (ice hockey) (born 1940), Slovenian ice hockey player
- Franc Smolej (skier) (1908–1996), Yugoslav Olympic cross-country skier
