= 1992–93 Slovenian Hockey League season =

1992–93 Slovenian Hockey League Season
- League: Slovenian Ice Hockey League
- Sport: Ice hockey
- Regular-season winner: Olimpija
- Champions: Jesenice
- Runners-up: Olimpija

Slovenian Ice Hockey League seasons
- ← 1991–92 1993–94 →

The 1992–93 Slovenian Ice Hockey League season was the second season of the Slovenian Hockey League.

At the end of the regular season the playoffs were held. Jesenice were the winners.

== Teams ==
- Bled
- Celje
- Jesenice
- Olimpija
- Slavija
- Triglav Kranj

== Standings after regular season ==
Rk	Team	GP	W	T	L	GF	GA	Pts
1.	Olimpija	20	18	0	2	224	34	36
2.	Bled	20	17	0	3	131	51	34
3.	Celje	20	13	0	7	129	72	26
5.	Jesenice	20	8	0	12	94	129	16
5.	Triglav Kranj	20	4	0	16	39	163	9
5.	Slavija	20	0	0	20	31	199	0

== Play-offs ==
=== First Part ===
Rk	Team	GP	W	T	L	GF	GA	Pts
1.	Olimpija	6	5	0	1	42	24	14
2.	Jesenice	6	4	0	2	38	28	9
3.	Bled	6	2	1	3	18	28	8
5.	Celje	6	0	1	5	19	37	3

=== Semi-finals ===
Olimpija defeated Celje 3–0 in a best of five series.

- Olimpija – Celje 14–1
- Celje – Olimpija 1–7
- Olimpija – Celje 8–5

Jesenice defeated Bled 3–2 in a best of five series.

- Jesenice – Bled 2–0
- Bled – Jesenice 4–1
- Jesenice – Bled 5–1
- Bled – Jesenice 5–2
- Jesenice – Bled 7–1

=== Finals ===
Jesenice defeated Olimpija 4–3 in a best of seven series.

- Olimpija – Jesenice 5–2
- Jesenice – Olimpija 5–3
- Olimpija – Jesenice 9–5
- Jesenice – Olimpija 9–6
- Olimpija – Jesenice 6–2
- Jesenice – Olimpija 4–3
- Olimpija – Jesenice 6–7

=== Third to sixth place ===
Rk	Team	GP	W	T	L	GF	GA	Pts
1.	Bled	6	6	0	0	70	7	12
2.	Celje	6	4	0	2	32	17	8
3.	Slavija	6	2	0	4	10	42	4
5.	Triglav Kranj	6	0	0	6	10	57	0
