= 1993–94 Slovenian Hockey League season =

- League: Slovenian Ice Hockey League
- Sport: Ice hockey
- Regular-season winner: Olimpija
- Champions: Jesenice
- Runners-up: Olimpija

Slovenian Ice Hockey League seasons
- ← 1992–93 1994–95 →

The 1993–94 Slovenian Ice Hockey League season was the third season of the Slovenian Ice Hockey League.

At the end of the regular season the playoffs were held. Jesenice were the winners.

== Teams ==
- Bled
- Celje
- Jesenice
- Kranjska Gora
- Maribor
- Olimpija
- Slavija

== First part of the season ==
Rk	Team	GP	W	T	L	GF	GA	Pts
1.	Celje	12	10	1	1	108	32	21
2.	Olimpija	12	10	1	1	110	33	21
3.	Jesenice	12	8	1	3	97	39	17
4.	Bled	12	6	1	5	85	48	13
5.	Triglav Kranj	12	4	0	8	51	94	8
6.	Maribor	12	1	1	10	33	136	3
7.	Slavija	12	0	1	11	17	118	

== Second part of season ==
The top four teams in part two went on to the playoffs, while the bottom three determined the final three places.

Rk	Team	GP	W	T	L	GF	GA	Pts
Group A (for 1st to 4th place)
1.	Olimpija	18	16	1	1	149	55	33
2.	Celje	18	14	0	4	97	64	28
3.	Jesenice	18	12	1	5	138	62	25
4.	Bled	18	8	0	10	113	74	16
Group B (for 5th to 7th place)
5.	Triglav Kranj	20	10	0	10	89	120	20
6.	Maribor	20	5	1	14	62	173	11
7.	Slavija	20	4	0	16	69	161	8

== Play-offs ==
=== Semi-finals ===
Olimpija defeated Bled 4–0 in a best of seven series.

- Olimpija – Bled 7–1
- Bled – Olimpija 5–8
- Olimpija – Bled 3–2
- Bled – Olimpija 1–4

Acroni Jesenice defeated Celje 4–1 in a best of seven series.

- Celje – Jesenice 4–5
- Jesenice – Celje 3–4
- Celje – Jesenice 5–3
- Jesenice – Celje 4–3
- Celje – Jesenice 4–7

=== Final ===
Jesenice defeated Olimpija 4–3 in a best of seven series.

- Olimpija – Jesenice 3–5
- Jesenice – Olimpija 2–6
- Olimpija – Jesenice 3–0
- Jesenice – Olimpija 4–6
- Olimpija – Jesenice 2–5
- Jesenice – Olimpija 6–2
- Olimpija – Jesenice 2–3

=== Third place ===
Celje defeated Bled 4–3 in a beast of seven series

=== Fifth place ===
Triglav Kranj defeated Maribor 2–0 in a best of three series.

- Triglav Kranj – Maribor 8–5
- Maribor – Triglav Kranj 4–5
