= 2012–13 Slovenian Hockey League season =

The 2012–13 Slovenian Hockey League season was the 22nd season of the Slovenian Hockey League, the top level of ice hockey in Slovenia. Three teams participated in the regular season, which was won by Mladi Jesenice. For the playoffs, the three teams from the regular season were joined by Olimpija, which had participated in the Erste Bank Eishockey Liga during the regular season, and Triglav Kranj and Slavija, which had both played in the Inter-National League during the regular season. Olimpija won the play-off championship by defeating Slavija in the final.

== Regular season ==
Pl.	Team	GP	W	OTW	OTL	L	Goals	Diff	Pts
1.	Mladi Jesenice	8	6	0	0	2	53–25	+28	18
2.	Maribor	8	5	0	1	2	39–30	+9	16
3.	Olimpija	8	0	1	0	7	23–60	–37	2

== Play-offs ==
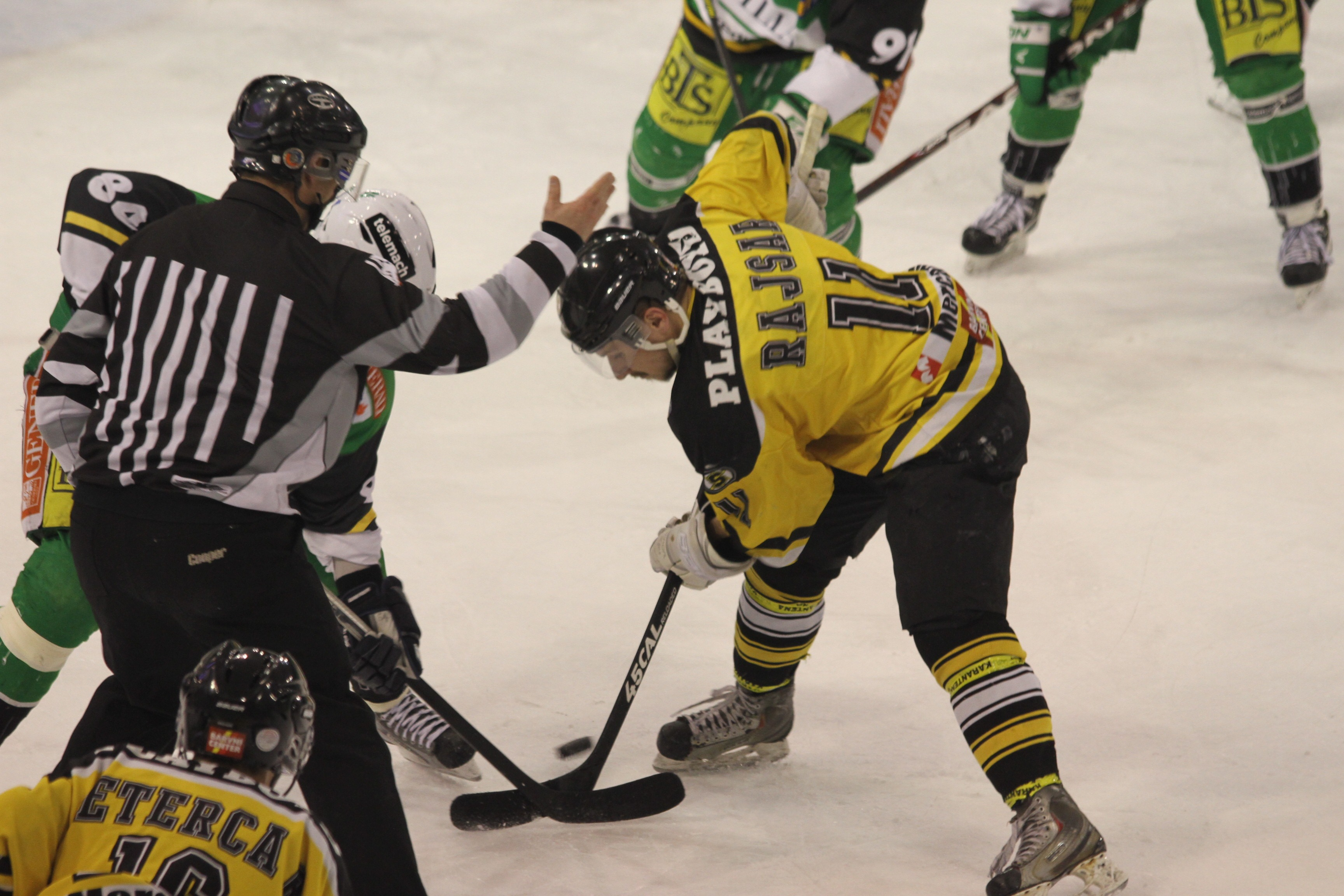
HDD Olimpija vs HK Slavija at Tivoli Hall

Quarter-finals
EBEL	HDD Olimpija
Bye
1	Mladi Jesenice	2
2	Maribor	0
INL	Triglav Kranj	2
3	HK Olimpija	0
INL	Slavija
Bye

Semi-finals
EBEL	HDD Olimpija	2
1	Mladi Jesenice	0
INL	Triglav	0
INL	Slavija	2

Final
EBEL	HDD Olimpija	2
INL	Slavija	0
