= 2011–12 Slovenian Hockey League season =

The 2011–12 Slovenian Hockey League season was the 21st season of the Slovenian Ice Hockey League, the top level of ice hockey in Slovenia. Seven teams participated in the league, and HDD Olimpija have won the championship. HDD Olimpija and Jesenice received byes to the play-offs.

== First round ==
=== Group A ===
	Team	GP	W	OTW	OTL	L	GF	GA	Pts
1.	Triglav Kranj	4	3	0	0	1	17	14	9
2.	Maribor	4	3	0	0	1	15	10	9
3.	HK Olimpija	4	2	0	0	2	16	13	6
4.	Slavija	4	1	0	1	2	15	17	4
5.	Bled	4	0	1	0	3	17	26	2

== Play-offs ==
=== Semi-finals ===
- Jesenice – Triglav Kranj 6–0, 5–2
- Olimpija – Maribor 4–1, 3–3

=== Final ===
- Olimpija – Jesenice 6–4, 2–3, 8–3, 5–2

=== 3rd place ===
- Triglav Kranj – Maribor 1–4, 1–4
