= 2009–10 Slovenian Hockey League season =

2009–10 Slovenian Hockey League Season
- League: Slovenian Ice Hockey League
- Sport: Ice hockey

Finals
- Champions: Jesenice
- Runners-up: Olimpija

Slovenian Hockey League seasons
- ← 2008–09 2010–11 →

The 2009–10 Slovenian Hockey League season was the 19th season of the Slovenian Ice Hockey League, the top domestic ice hockey competition in Slovenia. The 2009–10 season was quite different from previous seasons. The new Slohokej League, a multi-national league, in effect replaced the regular part of the Slovenian league, leaving only the playoffs. The playoffs were now opened only open to Slovenian teams, unlike in the past.

The Slovenian teams from the EBEL League and the best teams from the Slohokej League participated in the competition. It was first divided into two groups, and from there moved into the finals.

== Teams ==
=== From Slohokej ===
- HK Olimpija
- Maribor
- Mladi Jesenice
- Triglav Kranj

=== From EBEL ===
- HDD Olimpija
- Jesenice

== Group stage ==
=== Group 1 ===
Rk	Team	GP	W	OTW	OTL	L	GF	GA	Pts
1.	Jesenice	4	3	0	1	0	15	4	10
2.	Triglav Kranj	4	1	1	0	2	10	11	5
3.	Mladi Jesenice	4	1	0	0	3	6	16	3

=== Group 2 ===
Rk	Team	GP	W	OTW	OTL	L	GF	GA	Pts
2.	HDD Olimpija	4	4	0	0	0	27	3	12
3.	Maribor	4	2	0	0	2	12	9	6
5.	HK Olimpija	4	0	0	0	4	3	30	0

== Final ==
Jesenice defeated Olimpija 4–2 in a best of seven series.

- Jesenice – Olimpija 8–7 (3–4, 5–1, 0–2)
- Jesenice – Olimpija 1–4 (0–1, 0–3, 1–0)
- Olimpija – Jesenice 3–2 (0–1, 2–0, 0–1, 1–0) OT
- Olimpija – Jesenice 2–3 (2–1, 0–0, 0–2)
- Jesenice – Olimpija 7–1 (3–1, 3–0, 1–0)
- Olimpija – Jesenice 1–2 OT (0–1, 0–0, 1–0, 1–0)

== Third place ==
Maribor defeated Triglav Kranj 2–1 in a best of three series.

- Maribor – Triglav Kranj 7–2 (2–0, 2–0, 3–2)
- Triglav Kranj – Maribor 6–5 (1–2, 0–1, 4–2, 1–0) OT
- Maribor – Triglav Kranj 2–0 (2–0, 0–0, 0–0)
