= 2006–07 Slovenian Hockey League season =

2006–07 Slovenian Hockey League Season
- League: Slovenian Ice Hockey League
- Sport: Ice hockey
- Regular-season winners: Slavija
- Champions: Olimpija
- Runners-up: Slavija

Slovenian Ice Hockey League seasons
- ← 2005–06 season 2007–08 season →

The 2006–07 Slovenian Hockey League season was the 16th season in Slovenia.

At the end of the regular season the playoffs, also known as the Slovenian Ice Hockey League, was held. Slavija had the best result in the regular season, but they could not convert this in the finals, where they lost to Olimpija.

== Teams ==
- Alfa
- HDD Olimpija
- HK Olimpija
- Jesenice
- Maribor
- Mladi Jesenice
- Slavija
- Triglav Kranj

== Standings after regular season ==
Rk	Team	GP	W	L	GF	GA	Pts
1.	Slavija	14	12	2	95	30	35
2.	HDD Olimpija	14	12	2	79	23	35
3.	Jesenice	14	10	4	73	38	30
5.	Alfa	14	7	7	53	43	22
5.	Triglav Kranj	14	7	7	57	53	20
5.	Maribor	14	4	10	43	56	15
5.	Slavija	14	3	11	33	82	8
5.	HK Olimpija	14	1	13	23	131	3

== Play-offs ==
=== First part ===
Rk	Team	GP	W	L	GF	GA	Pts
1.	Olimpija	12	11	1	59	25	35
2.	Slavija	12	6	6	47	39	23
3.	Jesenice	12	5	7	44	49	17
5.	Alfa	12	2	10	24	61	7

=== Final ===
Olimpija defeated Slavija in a best of seven series.

- Olimpija – Slavija 2–4
- Olimpija – Slavija 5–3
- Slavija – Olimpija 1–6
- Slavija – Olimpija 1–2
- Olimpija – Slavija 4–3
