= 2007–08 Slovenian Hockey League season =

- League: Slovenian Ice Hockey League
- Sport: Ice hockey
- Regular-season winner: Mladi Jesenice
- Champions: Jesenice
- Runners-up: Olimpija

Slovenian Hockey League seasons
- ← 2006–07 season 2008–09 season →

The 2007–08 Slovenian Hockey League season was the 17th season in Slovenia. The competition was mostly made up of teams from Slovenia, but there was one team from Croatia too.

At the end of the regular season the playoffs, also known as the Slovenian Hockey Championship, was held. Despite qualifying for it, Croatian Medveščak was not allowed to participate because the Championship was open only to Slovenian teams. In the end Jesenice won the title, going undefeated in the play-offs.

== Teams ==
- (Slovenia) Alfa
- (Slovenia) Bled
- (Slovenia) HDD Olimpija (play-offs only)
- (Slovenia) HK Olimpija
- (Slovenia) Jesenice (play-offs only)
- (Slovenia) Maribor
- (Croatia) Medveščak
- (Slovenia) Mladi Jesenice
- (Slovenia) Slavija
- (Slovenia) Triglav Kranj

== Standings after regular season ==
Rk	Team	GP	W	OTW	OTL	L	GF	GA	Pts
1	(Slovenia) Mladi Jesenice	28	25	1	1	2	179	53	75
2	(Croatia) Medveščak	28	18	1	1	8	124	95	57
3	(Slovenia) Slavija	28	15	1	3	9	102	79	50
4	(Slovenia) Maribor	28	13	1	2	12	98	94	43
5	(Slovenia) Triglav Kranj	28	11	2	3	12	98	89	40
6	(Slovenia) HK Olimpija	27	8	3	1	15	82	117	31
7	(Slovenia) Bled	28	5	2	2	19	73	152	21
8	(Slovenia) Alfa	27	4	2	0	21	68	145	16

== Play-offs ==
=== Quarter-finals ===
Jesenice defeated Bled 2–0 in a best of three series.

- Jesenice – Bled 7–1 (2–1, 2–0, 3–0)
- Bled – Jesenice 2–15 (0–2, 1–6, 1–7)

HDD Olimpija defeated HK Olimpija 2–0 in a best of three series.

- HDD Olimpija – HK Olimpija 9–1 (2–0, 2–0, 5–1)
- HK Olimpija – HDD Olimpija 2–6 (1–2, 1–3, 0–1)

Mladi Jesenice defeated Triglav in a best of three series.

- Mladi Jesenice – Triglav 2–1 (1–0, 1–0, 0–1)
- Triglav – Mladi Jesenice 2–1 (0–0, 0–1, 2–0)
- Mladi Jesenice – Triglav 6–1 (2–1, 1–0, 3–0)

Maribor defeated Slavija 2–1 in a best of three series.

- Slavija – Maribor 1–5 (0–0, 1–3, 0–2)
- Maribor – Slavija 1–3 (1–1, 0–1, 0–1)
- Slavija – Maribor 2–4 (0–1, 0–2, 2–1)

=== Semi-finals ===
Jesenice defeated Maribor 2–0 in a best of three series.

- Jesenice – Maribor 1–0 (0–0, 0–0, 1–0)
- Maribor – Jesenice 1–8 (1–0, 0–3, 0–5)

Olimpija defeated Mladi Jesenice 2–1 in a best of three series.

- Olimpija – Mladi Jesenice 4–3 (1–2, 3–1, 0–0)
- Mladi Jesenice – Olimpija 4–3 (1–1, 1–1, 2–1)
- Olimpija – Mladi Jesenice 4–0 (1–0, 2–0, 1–0)

=== Final ===
Jesenice defeated Olimpija 4–0 in a best of seven series.

- Jesenice – Olimpija 6–2 (1–1, 4–0, 1–1)
- Jesenice – Olimpija 6–1 (2–1, 3–0, 1–0)
- Olimpija – Jesenice 1–2 (1–1, 0–1, 0–0)
- Olimpija – Jesenice 1–2 (0–2, 1–0, 0–0)
