= 2008–09 Slovenian Hockey League season =

2008–09 Slovenian Hockey League Season
- League: Slovenian Ice Hockey League
- Sport: Ice hockey
- Regular-season winner: Medveščak
- Champions: Jesenice
- Runners-up: Olimpija

Slovenian Ice Hockey League seasons
- ← 2007–08 season 2009–10 season →

The 2008–09 Slovenian Hockey League season was the 18th season of the Slovenian Ice Hockey League. The competition was mostly made up of teams from Slovenia, but there were also two teams from Croatia.

At the end of the regular season, the playoffs were held. It was the first time that the playoffs featured a non-Slovenian team. Jesenice won the title after defeating Olimpija in the final.

== Teams ==
- (Slovenia) Alfa
- (Slovenia) Bled
- (Slovenia) HK Olimpija
- (Slovenia) HDD Olimpija (play-offs only)
- (Slovenia) Jesenice (play-offs only)
- (Slovenia) Maribor
- (Slovenia) Maribor II
- (Croatia) Medveščak
- (Slovenia) Mladi Jesenice
- (Croatia) Mladost
- (Slovenia) Slavija
- (Slovenia) Triglav Kranj

== Standings after the regular season ==
| Rk | Team | GP | W | OTW | OTL | L | GF | GA | Pts |
|---|---|---|---|---|---|---|---|---|---|
| 1. | (Croatia) Meveščak | 35 | 33 | 0 | 1 | 1 | 227 | 66 | 100 |
| 2. | (Slovenia) Maribor | 35 | 25 | 3 | 3 | 4 | 208 | 59 | 84 |
| 3. | (Slovenia) Triglav Kranj | 35 | 21 | 2 | 1 | 11 | 172 | 71 | 68 |
| 4. | (Slovenia) Mladi Jesenice | 35 | 19 | 2 | 2 | 12 | 208 | 89 | 63 |
| 5. | (Slovenia) HK Olimpija | 35 | 16 | 5 | 4 | 10 | 192 | 98 | 62 |
| 6. | (Slovenia) Bled | 35 | 16 | 2 | 2 | 15 | 155 | 134 | 54 |
| 7. | (Croatia) Mladost | 35 | 14 | 1 | 2 | 18 | 152 | 175 | 46 |
| 8. | (Slovenia) Slavija | 35 | 8 | 2 | 2 | 23 | 140 | 160 | 30 |
| 9. | (Slovenia) Maribor II | 35 | 5 | 0 | 1 | 29 | 77 | 250 | 16 |
| 10. | (Slovenia) Alfa | 35 | 0 | 1 | 0 | 34 | 62 | 491 | 2 |

== Play-offs ==
=== Round 1 ===
Medveščak defeated Slavija 2–0 in a best of three series.

- Medveščak – Slavija 9–1 (2–0, 5–0, 2–1)
- Slavija – Medveščak 1–6 (0–1, 1–3, 0–2)

Maribor defeated Mladost 2–0 in a best of three series.

- Maribor – Mladost 3–1
- Mladost – Maribor 2–4 (0–1, 0–1, 2–2)

Triglav Kranj defeated Bled 2–1 in a best of three series.

- Triglav Kranj – Bled 5–3 (1–2, 4–0, 0–1)
- Bled – Triglav Kranj 6–2 (1–1, 3–1, 2–0)
- Triglav Kranj – Bled 6–0 (1–0, 4–0, 1–0)

HK Olimpija defeated Mladi Jesenice 2–0 in a best of three series.

- HK Olimpija – Mladi Jesenice 4–1 (1–1, 2–0, 1–0)
- Mladi Jesenice – HK Olimpija 1–3 (0–2, 1–0, 0–1)

=== Quarter-finals ===
Maribor defeated Triglav Kranj 2–1 in a best of three series.

- Maribor – Triglav Kranj 2–3 (0–1, 0–1, 2–1)
- Triglav Kranj – Maribor 2–3 OT (0–0, 1–0, 1–2, 0–1)
- Maribor – Triglav Kranj 7–2 (1–2, 4–0, 2–0)

Medveščak defeated HK Olimpija 2–0 in a best of three series.

- Medveščak – HK Olimpija 3–2 (0–0, 0–1, 2–1, 1–0) OT
- HK Olimpija – Medveščak 3–4 (0–1, 2–1, 1–2)

=== Semi-finals ===
Jesenice and HDD Olimpija joined in the semi-finals.

Jesenice defeated Maribor 2–0 in a best of three series.

- Jesenice – Maribor 8–2 (3–1, 4–1, 1–0)
- Maribor – Jesenice 2–3 (1–1, 1–1, 0–0, 0–1) OT

Olimpija defeated Medveščak 2–1 in a best of three series.

- Olimpija – Medveščak 0–1 (0–1, 0–0, 0–0)
- Medveščak – Olimpija 3–6 (2–2, 0–3, 1–1)
- Olimpija – Medveščak 4–1 (1–0, 2–1, 1–0)

=== Final ===
Jesenice defeated Olimpija 4–0 in a best of seven series.

- Jesenice – Olimpija 5–2 (3–0, 2–1, 0–1)
- Jesenice – Olimpija 2–1 (0–0, 1–0, 0–1, 0–0, 1–0)
- Olimpija – Jesenice 0–2 (0–0, 0–1, 0–1)
- Olimpija – Jesenice 1–2 (0–1, 0–0, 1–1)
