= 2010–11 Slovenian Hockey League season =

The 2010–11 Slovenian Hockey League season was the 20th season of the Slovenian Ice Hockey League, the top level of ice hockey in Slovenia. Six teams participated in the league, and Jesenice have won the championship.

== First round ==
=== Group A ===
	Team	GP	W	OTW	OTL	L	GF	GA	Pts
1.	HDD Olimpija	4	4	0	0	0	36	4	12
2.	Triglav Kranj	4	1	1	0	2	6	19	4
3.	Slavija	4	0	0	1	3	6	25	2

=== Group B ===
	Team	GP	W	OTW	OTL	L	GF	GA	Pts
1.	Jesenice	4	4	0	0	0	33	4	12
2.	HK Olimpija	4	2	0	0	2	23	12	6
3.	Bled	4	0	0	0	4	4	44	0

== Play-offs ==
=== Final ===
- HDD Olimpija – Jesenice 0–4 (2–3, 1–2, 2–4, 2–4)

=== 3rd place ===
- HK Olimpija – Triglav Kranj 2–1 (3–5, 6–2, 6–1)
