= 2010–11 Slohokej League season =

2010–11 Slohokej League Season
- League: Slohokej League
- Sport: Ice hockey
- Teams: 10
- Regular-season winner: Olimpija
- Champions: Partizan
- Runners-up: Olimpija

Slohokej League seasons
- ← 2009–10 2011–12 →

The 2010–11 Slohokej League season was the second season of the Slohokej League. In contrast to the previous season, the season featured one Croatian team rather than two, and a new Slovenian team joined the league as well. HDK Maribor were the defending champions, having won their first title the previous season.

== 2010–11 teams ==
Team	City	Arena	Capacity	Founded
HDD Bled	(Slovenia) Bled	Bled Ice Hall	1,000	2010
HK MK Bled	(Slovenia) Bled	Bled Ice Hall	1,000	1999
Junior Graz 99ers	(Austria) Graz	Eisstadion Graz Liebenau	4,050	2009
Maribor	(Slovenia) Maribor	Tabor Ice Hall	1,515	1993
Mladi Jesenice	(Slovenia) Jesenice	Podmežakla Hall	4,500	1999
HK Olimpija	(Slovenia) Ljubljana	Tivoli Hall	4,000	2004
Partizan	(Serbia) Belgrade	Pionir Ice Hall	2,000	1946
Slavija	(Slovenia) Ljubljana	Zalog Ice Hall	1,000	1964
Team Zagreb	(Croatia) Zagreb	Dvorana Velesajam	500	2010
Triglav Kranj	(Slovenia) Kranj	Zlato Polje Ice Hall	1,000	1968

== Standings ==
#	Club	GP	W	OTW	OTL	L	GF	GA	PIM	Pts
1.	Olimpija	27	24	1	0	2	196	67	450	74
2.	Partizan	27	22	2	0	3	141	50	602	70
3.	Maribor	27	15	2	2	8	91	68	445	51
4.	Triglav Kranj	27	15	1	0	11	96	81	693	47
5.	Team Zagreb	27	14	1	2	10	115	93	499	46
6.	Mladi Jesenice	27	11	4	2	10	103	89	423	43
7.	Junior Graz 99ers	27	6	2	5	14	72	112	569	27
8.	HDD Bled	27	6	1	4	16	89	137	703	24
9.	Slavija	27	5	2	1	19	59	115	541	20
10.	HK MK Bled	27	1	0	0	26	56	205	606	3

== Play-offs ==
=== Quarter-finals ===
- Olimpija – HDD Bled 2–0 (8–4, 7–3)
- Partizan – Junior Graz 99ers 2–0 (5–0, 5–1)
- Maribor – Mladi Jesenice 1–0 (1–1, 3–1)
- Triglav Kranj – Team Zagreb 0–2 (2–3, 2–3)

=== Semi-finals ===
- Olimpija – Team Zagreb 2–0 (10–0, 7–4)
- Partizan – Maribor 2–0 (7–1, 2–0)

=== Third place ===
- Maribor – Team Zagreb 2–0 (4–2, 3–1)

=== Final ===
- Olimpija – Partizan 1–3 (3–2 P, 2–10, 4–7, 0–4)
