= 2021–22 Alps Hockey League season =

2021–22 Alps Hockey League
- League: Alps Hockey League
- Sport: Ice hockey
- Teams: 17

Regular season

Playoffs
- Finals champions: (Italy) Asiago Hockey (2nd title)
- Runners-up: (Slovenia) HDD Jesenice

Alps Hockey League seasons
- ← 2020–21 2022–23 →

The 2021–22 Alps Hockey League was the sixth season of the Alps Hockey League. The defending champions were Slovenian team HK Olimpija that participate in ICE Hockey League beginning from the 2021–22 season.

== Teams ==
The number of participating teams has risen to seventeen from the previous season: Vienna Capitals Silver, reserve team of the Vienna Capitals (which in the previous season had decided not to participate due to the uncertainty caused by the COVID-19 pandemic) and the EK Zeller Eisbären (which was instead excluded due to the resignation of the board of directors of the company); HC Merano requested and obtained from the Italian Ice Sports Federation a wild-card that allowed him to enroll in the AHL and return to play the Italian top flight after seventeen years; the reigning champions HK Olimpija and HC Pustertal Wölfe from South Tyrol have instead moved to the ICE Hockey League.

Team	City	Arena	Capacity
(Austria) VEU Feldkirch	Feldkirch	Vorarlberghalle	5.200
(Austria) EHC Bregenzerwald	Dornbirn	Messestadion Dornbirn	4.270
(Austria) EC Kitzbühel	Kitzbühel	Sportpark Kapserbrücke	1.700
(Austria) EK Zeller Eisbären	Zell am See	Eishalle Zell am See	3.200
(Austria) KAC II (Note: Reserve team of KAC)	Klagenfurt	Stadthalle Klagenfurt	5.088
(Austria) EHC Lustenau	Lustenau	Rheinhalle	2.200
(Austria) Red Bull Hockey Juniors (Note: Reserve team of Red Bull Salzburg)	Salzburg	Eisarena Salzburg	3.200
(Austria) Steel Wings Linz (Note: Reserve team of Steinbach Black Wings)	Linz	KeineSorgen EisArena	4.865
(Austria) Vienna Capitals Silver (Note: Reserve team of Vienna Capitals)	Vienna	Steffl Arena, Halle 3	1.000
(Italy) SG Cortina	Cortina d'Ampezzo	Stadio olimpico del ghiaccio	2.700
(Italy) HC Fassa Falcons	Canazei	Stadio del Ghiaccio Gianmario Scola	3.500
(Italy) HC Gherdëina	Sëlva	Pranives	2.000
(Italy) HC Merano	Merano	Rienzstadion	2.050
(Italy) Asiago Hockey	Asiago	Hodegart	3.000
(Italy) Ritten Sport	Ritten	Arena Ritten	1.200
(Italy) Wipptal Broncos	Sterzing	Weihenstephan Arena; Palaghiaccio di Bressanone	1.700; 2.500
(Slovenia) HDD Jesenice	Jesenice	Podmežakla Hall	5.500

== Format ==
The formula has changed again: the seventeen teams will meet in a regular season, for a total of 32 games each. At the end of the regular season, the first six team will classify to the master round, the rest will be divided into the two qualification groups (the teams finished 7th, 10th, 11th, 14th, 15th will be placed in Group A, the others in Group B), also played in two rounds.

The first four teams at the end of the master round qualify directly to the play-offs. The remaining two teams in the master round and the top three in each qualification round group will instead have access to the preliminary round to determine the other four teams.

=== Changes to the regulation due to the COVID-19 pandemic ===
At the end of December 2021, when it became clear that the number of matches postponed for reasons related to the COVID-19 pandemic had become too high for all recoveries to be organized in time for the expected end of the regular season, the league decided that to determine the ranking not by the number of points earned, but the average of the points, calculated as the quotient between the points and the number of games played. In order to be considered classified, a team was still required to play at least 70% of the scheduled matches.

== National championships ==
=== Italian championship ===
The Italian teams participating in the AHL will also play for the Italian title. As in the 2018–19 season, all the matches between Italian teams during the regular season form a ranking, and at the end first four teams will play in the semifinals and the final.

=== Second division of the Austrian championship ===
Similarly to what happens for the Italian championship, the meetings between the Austrian teams in the regular season of the Alps Hockey League determine a ranking, at the end of which the first four teams will play for the second series title with semifinals and final with first legs and return.

The qualified teams are Lustenau, Kitzbühel, Bregenzerwald and Red Bull Salzburg Jr.

== Regular season ==
Pos	Team	Pld	W	OTW	OTL	L	GF	GA	GD	PCT	Qualification
1	HDD Jesenice	29	21	5	1	2	135	58	+77	.851	Qualification to Master round
2	Asiago Hockey	30	19	1	2	8	105	62	+43	.678	Qualification to Master round
3	Ritten Sport	31	18	2	1	10	119	82	+37	.634	Qualification to Master round
4	EHC Lustenau	29	14	5	2	8	97	73	+24	.621	Qualification to Master round
5	SG Cortina	28	14	2	1	11	91	71	+20	.560	Qualification to Master round
6	HC Fassa Falcons	30	16	0	1	13	112	93	+19	.544	Qualification to Master round
7	Red Bull Hockey Juniors	32	14	3	3	12	113	92	+21	.531	Qualification to Qualification Group A
8	HC Gherdëina	28	13	1	3	11	88	92	−4	.524	Qualification to Qualification Group B
9	EK Zeller Eisbären	31	14	2	2	13	108	108	0	.516	Qualification to Qualification Group B
10	EHC Bregenzerwald	24	10	2	3	9	79	72	+7	.514	Qualification to Qualification Group A
11	Wipptal Broncos	29	11	2	1	15	84	96	−12	.437	Qualification to Qualification Group A
12	HC Merano	27	10	2	1	14	73	95	−22	.432	Qualification to Qualification Group B
13	VEU Feldkirch	31	10	3	4	14	72	89	−17	.430	Qualification to Qualification Group B
14	EC Kitzbühel	28	7	2	5	14	80	114	−34	.357	Qualification to Qualification Group A
15	KAC II	31	10	0	2	19	69	100	−31	.344	Qualification to Qualification Group A
16	Steel Wings Linz	31	8	1	1	21	74	134	−60	.290	Qualification to Qualification Group B
17	Vienna Capitals Silver	27	6	0	0	21	59	127	−68	.222	Qualification to Qualification Group B

Source: Alps Hockey League

== Second stage ==
=== Master Round ===
The first six teams at the end of the regular season qualified for the Master Round, with the first four classified being given the bonus from 4 to 1 point. At the end of the master round, the first four teams qualify directly to the quarter-finals of the play-offs, the other qualify to the preliminary round.

Pos	Team	Pld	W	OTW	OTL	L	GF	GA	GD	Pts	Qualification
1	Asiago Hockey	10	7	1	1	1	45	23	+22	27	Qualification to Quarterfinals
2	HDD Jesenice	9	5	0	0	4	32	30	+2	19	Qualification to Quarterfinals
3	Ritten Sport	10	4	2	0	4	33	25	+8	18	Qualification to Quarterfinals
4	EHC Lustenau	10	5	1	0	4	30	31	−1	18	Qualification to Quarterfinals
5	SG Cortina	10	4	0	2	4	28	29	−1	14	Qualification to Preliminary round
6	HC Fassa Falcons	9	0	0	1	8	17	47	−30	1	Qualification to Preliminary round

Source: Alps Hockey League

=== Qualification Group A ===
Teams finished 7th, 10th, 11th, 14th and 15th in the regular season are qualified for Qualification Group A, with the first three receiving bonus equal to 6, 3 and 2 points respectively. At the end of the qualifying round, the top three teams advance to the preliminary round.

Pos	Team	Pld	W	OTW	OTL	L	GF	GA	GD	Pts	Qualification
1	Red Bull Hockey Juniors	8	5	0	2	1	31	18	+13	23	Qualification to Preliminary round
2	EHC Bregenzerwald	8	3	1	2	2	33	29	+4	16	Qualification to Preliminary round
3	Wipptal Broncos	8	4	0	1	3	20	19	+1	15	Qualification to Preliminary round
4	KAC II	8	2	3	1	2	29	21	+8	13	
5	EC Kitzbühel	8	0	2	0	6	11	37	−26	4	

Source: Alps Hockey League

=== Qualification Group B ===
Teams finished 8th, 9th, 12th, 13th, 16th and 17th in the regular season are qualified for Qualification Group B, with the first three receiving bonus equal to 5, 4 and 1 point respectively. At the end of the qualifying round, the top three teams advance to the preliminary round.

Pos	Team	Pld	W	OTW	OTL	L	GF	GA	GD	Pts	Qualification
1	HC Gherdëina	10	7	0	0	3	37	19	+18	26	Qualification to Preliminary round
2	EK Zeller Eisbären	10	4	1	2	3	27	24	+3	20	Qualification to Preliminary round
3	Steel Wings Linz	10	6	0	0	4	33	31	+2	18	Qualification to Preliminary round
4	VEU Feldkirch	10	3	3	1	3	34	33	+1	16	
5	HC Merano	10	3	1	2	4	26	27	−1	14	
6	Vienna Capitals Silver	10	2	0	0	8	17	40	−23	6	

Source: Alps Hockey League

== Play-offs ==
=== Bracket ===
Pre-playoffs (best-of-3)
MR5	SG Cortina	2
QB3	Steel Wings Linz	0
MR6	HC Fassa Falcons	0
QA3	Wipptal Broncos	2
QA1	Red Bull Hockey Juniors	0
QB2	EK Zeller Eisbären	2
QB1	HC Gherdëina	2
QA2	EHC Bregenzerwald	1

Quarter-finals (best-of-5)
MR1	Asiago Hockey	3
QA3	Wipptal Broncos	0
MR2	HDD Jesenice	3
QB1	HC Gherdëina	2
MR3	Ritten Sport	3
MR5	SG Cortina	2
MR4	EHC Lustenau	3
QB2	EK Zeller Eisbären	2

Semi-finals (best-of-5)
MR1	Asiago Hockey	3
MR4	EHC Lustenau	1
MR2	HDD Jesenice	3
MR3	Ritten Sport	1

Finals (best-of-5)
MR1	Asiago Hockey	3
MR2	HDD Jesenice	2

=== Pre-playoffs ===
SG Cortina – Steel Wings Linz 2–0
08.03.2022	SG Cortina	Steel Wings Linz	4–1
10.03.2022	Steel Wings Linz	SG Cortina	0–4
SG Cortina won the series 2–0

HC Fassa Falcons – Wipptal Broncos 0–2
08.03.2022	HC Fassa Falcons	Wipptal Broncos	4–5 OT
10.03.2022	Wipptal Broncos	HC Fassa Falcons	6–3
Wipptal Broncos won the series 2–0

Red Bull Hockey Juniors – EK Zeller Eisbären 0–2
08.03.2022	Red Bull Hockey Juniors	EK Zeller Eisbären	5–6
10.03.2022	EK Zeller Eisbären	Red Bull Hockey Juniors	4–3
EK Zeller Eisbären won the series 2–0

HC Gherdëina – EHC Bregenzerwald 2–1
08.03.2022	HC Gherdëina	EHC Bregenzerwald	3–2
10.03.2022	EHC Bregenzerwald	HC Gherdëina	4–3 OT
12.03.2022	HC Gherdëina	EHC Bregenzerwald	3–2
HC Gherdëina won the series 2–1

=== Quarterfinals ===
Asiago Hockey – Wipptal Broncos 3–0
15.03.2022	Asiago Hockey	Wipptal Broncos	8–2
17.03.2022	Wipptal Broncos	Asiago Hockey	2–6
19.03.2022	Asiago Hockey	Wipptal Broncos	6–4
Asiago Hockey won the series 3–0

Ritten Sport – SG Cortina 3–2
15.03.2022	Ritten Sport	SG Cortina	2–4
17.03.2022	SG Cortina	Ritten Sport	4–2
19.03.2022	Ritten Sport	SG Cortina	1–0 OT
22.03.2022	SG Cortina	Ritten Sport	0–2
24.03.2022	Ritten Sport	SG Cortina	5–1
Ritten Sport won the series 3–2

HDD Jesenice – HC Gherdëina 3–2
15.03.2022	HDD Jesenice	HC Gherdëina	4–0
17.03.2022	HC Gherdëina	HDD Jesenice	2–3 OT
19.03.2022	HDD Jesenice	HC Gherdëina	1–5
22.03.2022	HC Gherdëina	HDD Jesenice	4–2
24.03.2022	HDD Jesenice	HC Gherdëina	2–1
HDD Jesenice won the series 3–2

EHC Lustenau – EK Zeller Eisbären 3–2
15.03.2022	EHC Lustenau	EK Zeller Eisbären	2–3
17.03.2022	EK Zeller Eisbären	EHC Lustenau	3–4
19.03.2022	EHC Lustenau	EK Zeller Eisbären	3–4 OT
22.03.2022	EK Zeller Eisbären	EHC Lustenau	3–4
24.03.2022	EHC Lustenau	EK Zeller Eisbären	3–1
EHC Lustenau won the series 3–2

=== Semifinals ===
Asiago Hockey – EHC Lustenau 3–1
26.03.2022	Asiago Hockey	EHC Lustenau	5–0 (awarded)
29.03.2022	EHC Lustenau	Asiago Hockey	5–3
31.03.2022	Asiago Hockey	EHC Lustenau	4–2
02.04.2022	EHC Lustenau	Asiago Hockey	2–3 OT
Asiago Hockey won the series 3–1

HDD Jesenice – Ritten Sport 3–1
26.03.2022	HDD Jesenice	Ritten Sport	2–1
29.03.2022	Ritten Sport	HDD Jesenice	3–2
31.03.2022	HDD Jesenice	Ritten Sport	6–0
02.04.2022	Ritten Sport	HDD Jesenice	4–5 OT
HDD Jesenice won the series 3–1

=== Finals ===
9 April 2022; 20:30 (UTC+2)	Asiago Hockey	4–1 (0–0, 2–1, 2–0) (score in the series: 1–0)	HDD Jesenice	Hodegart, Asiago; Attendance: 1,020

Game reference

Gianluca Vallini
Goalies
Oscar Froberg
Referees:
Matthias Ruetz
Jakob Schauer
Linesmen:
Christoph Eisl
Alexander Weiss

	0–1	29:14 – Jenko (Viikila, Elo) (PP1)
Salinitri (Magnabosco, Iacobellis) – 36:23	1–1
Casetti (Giliati, Mantenuto) – 37:21	2–1
Magnabosco (Iacobellis, Salinitri) – 43:26	3–1
Ginnetti (EN) – 59:43	4–1

6 min
Penalties
6 min
28
Shots
34

12 April 2022; 19:00 (UTC+2)	HDD Jesenice	4–3 OT (2–1, 0–2, 1–0) (OT: 1–0) (score in the series: 1–1)	Asiago Hockey	Dvorana Podmežakla, Jesenice; Attendance: 2,247

Game reference

Oscar Froberg
Goalies
Gianluca Vallini
Referees:
Miha Bajt
Alexander Hlavaty
Linesmen:
Matej Arlič
Alexander Wimmler

Brus (Sotlar) – 06:09	1–0
	1–1	10:43 – Finoro
Ulamec (Sotlar, Zibelnik) – 15:54	2–1
	2–2	20:22 – Casetti (Giliati, Mantenuto)
	2–3	37:22 – Marchetti
Scap (Viikila, Elo) – 52:29	3–3
Viikila (Elo, Pance) – 60:49	4–3

6 min
Penalties
10 min
34
Shots
30

14 April 2022; 20:30 (UTC+2)	Asiago Hockey	1–4 (0–0, 1–1, 0–3) (score in the series: 1–2)	HDD Jesenice	Hodegart, Asiago; Attendance: 1,200

Game reference

Gianluca Vallini (00:00–10:39)
Stevan Luca (10:39–60:00)
Goalies
Oscar Froberg
Referees:
Tobias Holzer
Andrea Moschen
Linesmen:
Mauro De Zordo
Wolfgang Puff

	0–1	21:46 – Stevan (Parini, Vankúš)
Zibelnik (Viikila, Elo) – 20:31	1–1
	1–2	54:51 – Jenko
	1–3	58:39 – Glavič (EN)
	1–4	59:00 – Glavič (EN)

2 min
Penalties
0 min
36
Shots
20

16 April 2022; 18:00 (UTC+2)	HDD Jesenice	2–4 (1–1, 1–1, 0–2) (score in the series: 2–2)	Asiago Hockey	Dvorana Podmežakla, Jesenice; Attendance: 3,950

Game reference

Oscar Froberg
Goalies
Stevan Luca
Referees:
Matthias Ruetz
Jakob Schauer
Linesmen:
Matej Arlič
Mauro De Zordo

	0–1	06:35 – Iacobellis (Salinitri, Parini)
Logar (Zibelnik, Pance) – 11:55	1–1
Elo (Pance, Viikila) – 20:29	2–1
	2–2	30:58 – Marchetti (Iacobellis)
	2–3	53:14 – Salinitri (Magnabosco, Iacobellis)
	2–4	59:22 – Magnabosco (Casetti, Salinitri)

8 min
Penalties
8 min
29
Shots
39

19 April 2022; 20:30 (UTC+2)	Asiago Hockey	2–1 (0–0, 1–1, 1–0) (score in the series: 3–2)	HDD Jesenice	Hodegart, Asiago; Attendance: 1,680

Game reference

Stevan Luca
Goalies
Oscar Froberg

Miglioranzi (Vankúš, Ginnetti) – 28:49	1–0
	1–1	29:29 – Glavič (P. Rajsar, Jenko)
Finoro – 58:30	2–1

6 min
Penalties
8 min
44
Shots
23

== Final rankings ==
Gold medal	Asiago Hockey
Silver medal	HDD Jesenice
Bronze medal	Ritten Sport
4	EHC Lustenau
5	SG Cortina
6	HC Gherdëina
7	EK Zeller Eisbären
8	Wipptal Broncos
9	HC Fassa Falcons
10	Red Bull Hockey Juniors
11	EHC Bregenzerwald
12	Steel Wings Linz
13	VEU Feldkirch
14	KAC II
15	HC Merano
16	EC Kitzbühel
17	Vienna Capitals Silver
