= Aleksandar Magovac =

Slovenian ice hockey player (born 1991)

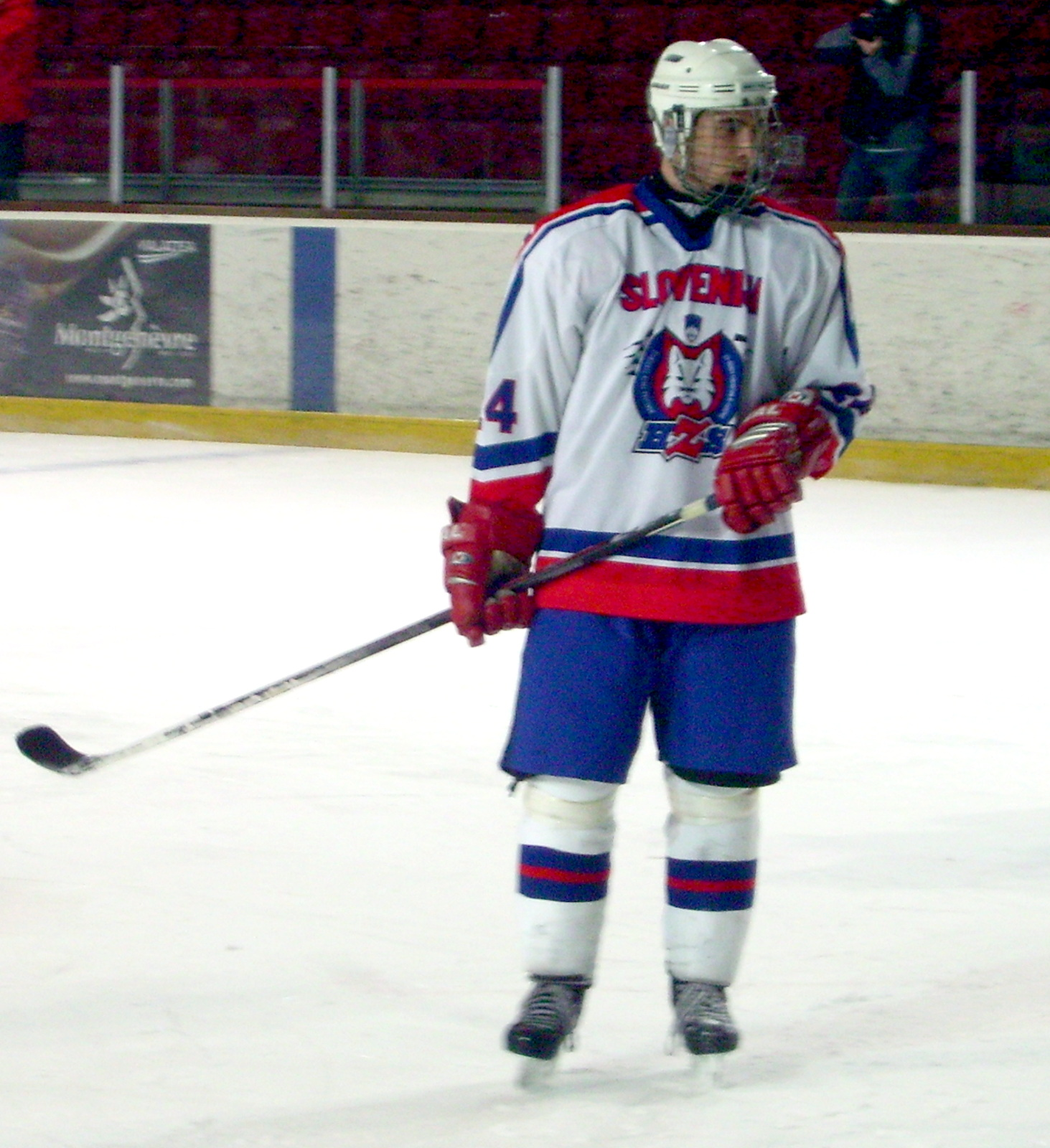
- Born: 9 February 1991 (age 35) Jesenice, Yugoslavia
- Height: 6 ft 0 in (183 cm)
- Weight: 203 lb (92 kg; 14 st 7 lb)
- Position: Defence
- Shoots: Right
- ICEHL team Former teams: HK Olimpija; HD Mladi Jesenice; Orli Znojmo; Brûleurs de Loups; HK Poprad; HC Nové Zámky
- National team: Slovenia
- NHL draft: Undrafted
- Playing career: 2007–present

Aleksandar Magovac (born 9 February 1991) is a Slovenian professional ice hockey player who is a defenceman for HK Olimpija of the ICE Hockey League (ICEHL).

== Career statistics ==
=== Regular season and playoffs ===
			Regular season					Playoffs
Season	Team	League	GP	G	A	Pts	PIM	GP	G	A	Pts	PIM
2007–08	HD Mladi Jesenice	Slovenian	24	1	1	2	0	3	0	0	0	0
2008–09	HD Mladi Jesenice	Slovenian	34	3	7	10	26	1	0	0	0	2
2009–10	HD Mladi Jesenice	Slovenian	4	1	1	2	2	—	—	—	—	—
2009–10	HD Mladi Jesenice	Slohokej	26	4	9	13	38	6	2	2	4	0
2009–10	HK Jesenice	EBEL	16	0	1	1	2	—	—	—	—	—
2019–20	HK Poprad	Slovak	29	1	2	3	6	—	—	—	—	—
2019–20	HC Nové Zámky	Slovak	11	0	1	1	2	—	—	—	—	—
2020–21	HK Olimpija	AlpsHL	36	4	33	37	16	11	2	5	7	0
2020–21	HK Olimpija	Slovenian	8	1	4	5	2	7	1	3	4	2
2021–22	HK Olimpija	ICEHL	42	7	11	18	6	7	0	3	3	0
2021–22	HK Olimpija	Slovenian	2	0	1	1	2	5	0	2	2	2
Slovak totals			40	1	3	4	8	—	—	—	—	—

=== International ===
Year	Team	Event	Result	GP	G	A	Pts	PIM
2008	Slovenia	WJC18 D1	6th	5	1	1	2	0
2008	Slovenia	WJC D1	6th	5	1	0	1	4
2009	Slovenia	WJC18 D2	2nd	5	2	4	6	2
2010	Slovenia	WJC D1	3rd	5	0	0	0	2
2011	Slovenia	WJC D1	2nd	5	0	2	2	4
2018	Slovenia	WC D1A	5th	5	1	1	2	4
2019	Slovenia	WC D1A	4th	5	1	2	3	2
2021	Slovenia	OGQ	DNQ	3	0	0	0	0
2022	Slovenia	WC D1A	5th	4	0	0	0	4
2023	Slovenia	WC	16th	7	0	1	1	6
2024	Slovenia	WC D1A	5th	5	0	1	1	4
2024	Slovenia	OGQ	DNQ	3	0	1	1	2
2025	Slovenia	WC	13th	7	0	0	0	2
2026	Slovenia	WC	13th	7	0	1	1	2
Junior totals				25	4	7	11	12
Senior totals				46	2	7	9	26
