= Žiga Pešut =

Slovenian ice hockey player

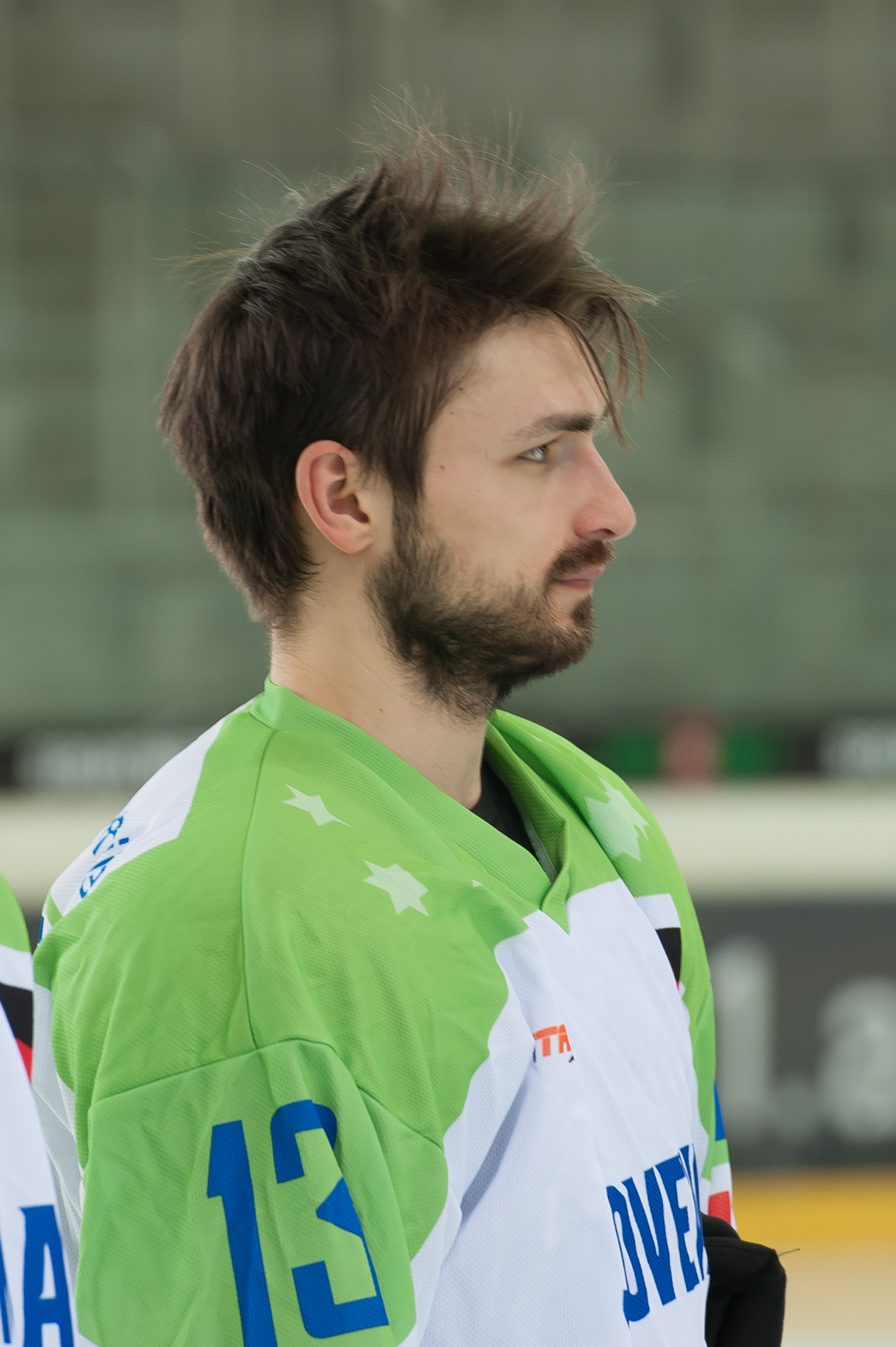
- Pešut with Slovenia in 2015
- Born: 5 October 1992 (age 33) Maribor, Slovenia
- Height: 6 ft 1 in (185 cm)
- Weight: 191 lb (87 kg; 13 st 9 lb)
- Position: Forward
- Shoots: Left
- Ligue Magnus team Former teams: Les Aigles de Nice; Grums IK; NED Hockey Nymburk; HDD Olimpija; EHC Bayreuth; Olimpija Ljubljana; Herlev Eagles
- National team: Slovenia
- Playing career: 2009–present

Žiga Pešut (born October 5, 1992) is a Slovenian professional ice hockey player. He is currently playing for the Les Aigles de Nice of the French Ligue Magnus and Slovenia national team.

Pešut started playing hockey for his hometown team HDK Maribor. At age 16 he moved to Sweden to play for Grums IK of the Division 2. From 2010 to 2013 Pešut spent three seasons playing in the Czech Republic before signing a deal with Erste Bank Hockey League (EBEL) team HDD Olimpija. After four seasons he joined German club EHC Bayreuth of the DEL2. From 2018 to 2021 he played for Olimpija Ljubljana. At the beginning of 2022, he signed for Herlev Eagles in the top Danish division and at the beginning of 2023, he signed for the French team Les Aigles de Nice.

== Youth career ==
In 2007, Pešut began playing for the U19 team of his hometown HDK Maribor. Next season he played also for HDK Maribor's second team and represented Slovenia at the U18 World Championship Division II.

He experienced playing abroad for the first time in 2009/10 season in which he played for Grums IK U18, U20 and first selection. At the U18 World Championship Division II he was Slovenia's best scorer.

From 2010 until 2012 Pešut played for Czech U20 teams HC Slezan Opava and BK Mladá Boleslav. In both seasons he was part of Slovenia's U20 team at the 2011 World Junior Championship Division I and 2012 World Junior Championship Division I.

== Professional career ==
In 2012-13 he was loaned to NED Hockey Nymburk. Next season Pešut returned to his home country and played first professional year as a member of HDD Olimpija helping them to win the national title. 2014-15 was the season he was called to the senior national team for the first time.

The following season, 2015–16, Pešut was HDD Olimpija's leading scorer by points and goals scored in Erste Bank Hockey League. In the same season HDD Olimpija won Slovenian Ice Hockey League and Slovenian Ice Hockey Cup. In 2016 he was part of the Slovenian national ice hockey team which gained promotion from World Championship Division I to Ice Hockey World Championships at the tournament in Poland.

After another season in Ljubljana, he signed contract for the 2017–18 with the DEL2 team EHC Bayreuth.

In 2018, Olimpija Ljubljana announced they have signed Pešut. In this season they beat HC Pustertal in the AHL finals 4-3 after trailing 1-3 after first four games. Pešut also won the Slovenian national championship with the team, having scored in both finals games. At the beginning of the 2019–20 season Olimpija Ljubljana won Slovenian Ice Hockey Cup. In 2020-21 the club won AHL once again, with Pešut providing most points for the team in the finals against Asiago Hockey 1935.

== Career statistics ==
=== Regular season and playoffs ===
			Regular season					Playoffs
Season	Team	League	GP	G	A	Pts	PIM	GP	G	A	Pts	PIM
2007–08	HDK Maribor U19	SLO-U19	23	10	18	28	46	5	2	1	3	2
2008–09	HDK Maribor II	SLO	29	19	11	30	55	—	—	—	—	—
2008–09	HDK Maribor U19	SLO-U19	24	28	27	55	10	4	0	2	2	6
2009–10	Grums IK U18	J18	29	16	7	23	14	—	—	—	—	—
2009–10	Grums IK U20	J20	9	7	8	15	4	—	—	—	—	—
2009–10	Grums IK	Div 2	6	7	1	8	6	—	—	—	—	—
2010–11	HC Slezan Opava U20	CZE U20	39	14	13	27	10	—	—	—	—	—
2011–12	BK Mladá Boleslav U20	CZE U20	35	12	9	21	12	—	—	—	—	—
2012–13	NED Hockey Nymburk	CZE 3	—	—	—	—	—	1	0	0	0	0
2013–14	HDD Olimpija	EBEL	54	9	22	31	20	—	—	—	—	—
2013–14	HDD Olimpija	SLO	—	—	—	—	—	4	0	4	4	4
2014–15	HDD Olimpija	EBEL	54	9	13	22	26	—	—	—	—	—
2014–15	HDD Olimpija	SLO	1	0	0	0	2	6	2	5	7	27
2015–16	HDD Olimpija	EBEL	46	13	14	27	28	—	—	—	—	—
2015–16	HDD Olimpija	SLO	—	—	—	—	—	6	3	3	6	8
2016–17	HDD Olimpija	EBEL	35	13	11	24	20	—	—	—	—	—
2016–17	HDD Olimpija	SLO	—	—	—	—	—	7	5	2	7	2
2017–18	EHC Bayreuth	DEL2	9	3	2	5	2	—	—	—	—	—
2018–19	Olimpija Ljubljana	AHL	20	3	3	6	2	14	7	1	8	10
2018–19	Olimpija Ljubljana	SLO	5	3	7	10	12	3	2	1	3	2
2019–20	Olimpija Ljubljana	AHL	40	13	18	31	22	—	—	—	—	—
2019–20	Olimpija Ljubljana	SLO	9	4	2	6	4	2	1	0	1	0
2020–21	Olimpija Ljubljana	AHL	4	5	3	8	0	9	5	4	9	0
2020–21	Olimpija Ljubljana	SLO	—	—	—	—	—	5	0	1	1	0
2021–22	Herlev Eagles	DAN	7	2	0	2	4	1	0	0	0	0
2022–23	Nice	FRA	4	1	2	3	0	—	—	—	—	—

=== International ===
Year	Team	Comp	GP	G	A	Pts	PIM
2008–09	Slovenia	U18 (Div II)	5	1	3	4	2
2009–10	Slovenia	U18 (Div II)	5	10	13	23	4
2010–11	Slovenia	U20 (Div I)	1	0	0	0	0
2011–12	Slovenia	U20 (Div I)	5	3	1	4	4
2014–15	Slovenia	International	6	0	0	0	0
2015–16	Slovenia	WC (Div I)	5	0	0	0	0
2015–16	Slovenia	International	8	0	0	0	0
2016–17	Slovenia	International	3	1	0	1	0
2020–21	Slovenia	International	4	1	2	3	0

== Awards and honours ==
Award	Year
Alps Hockey League
Champion (Olimpija)	2019, 2021
Slovenian Ice Hockey League
Champion (Olimpija)	2014, 2016, 2019
Slovenian Ice Hockey Cup
Champion (Olimpija)	2016, 2020
World Championship Division I
Gold medal (Slovenia)	2016
World U20 Championship Division I
Silver medal (Slovenia)	2011
World U18 Championship Division II
Gold medal (Slovenia)	2010
Points leader	2010
Goals leader	2010
Silver medal (Slovenia)	2009
