= Slohokej League =

International ice hockey league in Croatia, Serbia and Slovenia

- Most recent season or competition: 2011–12 Slohokej League season
- Slohokej League logo
- Sport: Ice hockey
- Founded: 2009; 17 years ago
- Folded: 2012; 14 years ago
- Country: Austria; Croatia; Serbia; Slovenia
- Most titles: (Serbia) Partizan (2 titles)

The Slohokej League (Slohokej Liga) was a multinational ice hockey league in Europe. The competition consisted of teams from Austria, Croatia, Serbia and Slovenia.

== Former teams ==
HD Mladi Jesenice vs. HDD Bled in the 2011–12 season at the Podmežakla Hall

Team	City	Arena	Founded
HDD Bled	(Slovenia) Bled	Bled Ice Hall	2010
HKMK Bled	(Slovenia) Bled	Bled Ice Hall	1999
Junior Graz 99ers	(Austria) Graz	Eisstadion Graz Liebenau	2009
Maribor	(Slovenia) Maribor	Tabor Ice Hall	1993
Medveščak II	(Croatia) Zagreb	Dvorana Velesajam	2003
Mladi Jesenice	(Slovenia) Jesenice	Podmežakla Hall	1999
Mladost	(Croatia) Zagreb	Dvorana Velesajam	1946
Olimpija	(Slovenia) Ljubljana	Tivoli Hall	2004
Partizan	(Serbia) Belgrade	Pionir Ice Hall	1948
Slavija	(Slovenia) Ljubljana	Zalog Ice Hall	1964
Team Zagreb	(Croatia) Zagreb	Dvorana Velesajam	2010
Triglav Kranj	(Slovenia) Kranj	Zlato Polje Ice Hall	1968

== List of seasons ==
Season	Champions	Runners-up	Final series score	Regular season winner
2009–10	(Slovenia) Maribor	(Serbia) Partizan	2–0	(Slovenia) Triglav Kranj
2010–11	(Serbia) Partizan	(Slovenia) Olimpija	3–1	(Slovenia) Olimpija
2011–12	(Serbia) Partizan	(Slovenia) Olimpija	3–2	(Slovenia) Maribor

== See also ==
- Erste Bank Eishockey Liga
- Slovenian Ice Hockey League
- Yugoslav Ice Hockey League
- Inter-National League
- Interliga
