= 2009 IIHF World U18 Championship Division II =

Tournament details
- Host countries: Slovenia; Estonia
- Venues: 2 (in 2 host cities)
- Dates: 22–28 March 2009; 16–22 March 2009
- Teams: 12

The 2009 IIHF World U18 Championship Division II was an international under-18 ice hockey competition organised by the International Ice Hockey Federation. Both Division II tournaments made up the third level of competition of the 2009 IIHF World U18 Championships. The Group A tournament took place between 22 and 28 March 2009 in Maribor, Slovenia and the Group B tournament took place between 16 and 22 March 2009 in Narva, Estonia. South Korea and Great Britain won the Group A and B tournaments respectively and gained promotion to Division I of the 2010 IIHF World U18 Championships.

== Group A ==
The Group A tournament was played in Maribor, Slovenia at Tabor Ice Hall from 22 to 28 March 2009.

=== Final standings ===
Pos	Team	Pld	W	OTW	OTL	L	GF	GA	GD	Pts	Promotion or relegation
1	South Korea	5	5	0	0	0	30	4	+26	15	Promoted to the 2010 Division I
2	Slovenia	5	4	0	0	1	42	5	+37	12	
3	Romania	5	3	0	0	2	23	20	+3	9	
4	Croatia	5	2	0	0	3	23	27	−4	6	
5	Spain	5	1	0	0	4	12	27	−15	3	
6	Mexico	5	0	0	0	5	3	50	−47	0	Relegated to the 2010 Division III

Source: IIHF

=== Results ===
All times are local.

March 22, 2009; 13:00	South Korea	3–1	Spain	Tabor Ice Hall; Attendance: 311

	Referee: W Marczuk (Poland)
Kim HW (EQ) 03:54; Yum JY (EQ) 24:38; Yoon JM (EQ) 51:24 / Goals / J Bravo (EQ) 35:25	Referee: W Marczuk (Poland)

March 22, 2009; 16:30	Mexico	2–10	Romania	Tabor Ice Hall; Attendance: 303

	Referee: M Hicks (United Kingdom)
A Duff (EQ) 10:50; C Smithers (EQ) 51:25 / Goals / A Imecs (EQ) 06:57; N Kovacs (EQ) 07:59; Z Peter (EQ) 14:23; L Pascaru (EQ) 15:05; Z Peter (EQ) 24:44; L Pascaru (EQ) 25:50; A Imecs (PP) 37:00; R Gliga (EQ) 51:06; A Imecs (EQ) 51:50; C Mihailescu (EQ) 57:49	Referee: M Hicks (United Kingdom)

March 22, 2009; 20:00	Croatia	1–14	Slovenia	Tabor Ice Hall; Attendance: 710

	Referee: L Cassol (Italy)
M Blagus (EQ) 58:00 / Goals / G Rezek (EQ) 01:56; M Verlic (EQ) 10:06; A Kurlat (EQ) 10:56; G Rezek (EQ) 13:12; A Kuralt (PP) 17:27; G Rezek (PP) 22:18; D Pungarsek (SH) 26:52; N Lahajnar (EQ) 30:34; D Pungarsek (EQ) 30:59; M Verlic (EQ) 34:18; A Zupancic (EQ) 39:03; D Pungarsek (EQ) 43:08; A Kuralt (SH) 45:23; E Pance (EQ) 56:45	Referee: L Cassol (Italy)

March 23, 2009; 13:00	South Korea	5–1	Croatia	Tabor Ice Hall; Attendance: 275

	Referee: R Husicka (Czech Republic)
Yoon JM (SH) 05:51; Kim CJ (PP) 32:34; Yoon JM (PP) 45:07; Ahn JH (EQ) 53:50; Ahn JH (ENG) 56:24 / Goals / D Kanaet (SH) 51:14	Referee: R Husicka (Czech Republic)

March 23, 2009; 16:30	Spain	7–0	Mexico	Tabor Ice Hall; Attendance: 256

	Referee: L Cassol (Italy)
Z Martinez (PP) 10:19; A Cumming (EQ) 17:20; J Bravo (EQ) 30:12; E Michelena (EQ) 30:46; O Boronat (PP) 47:17; I Lasuen (EQ) 51:22; O Boronat (EQ) 57:34 / Goals	Referee: L Cassol (Italy)

March 23, 2009; 20:00	Slovenia	6–0	Romania	Tabor Ice Hall; Attendance: 489

	Referee: W Marczuk (Poland)
E Pance (SH) 16:45; K Ograjensek (EQ) 23:18; A Kuralt (EQ) 33:21; E Pance (EQ) 44:40; K Ograjensek (EQ) 45:21; R Leber (PP) 57:55 / Goals	Referee: W Marczuk (Poland)

March 25, 2009; 13:00	Croatia	1–6	Romania	Tabor Ice Hall; Attendance: 276

	Referee: M Hicks (United Kingdom)
B Rendulić (PP) 36:35 / Goals / T Biro (PP) 12:26; C Tapu (SH) 23:28; L Pascaru (SH) 33:28; Z Peter (EQ) 37:45; C Mihailescu (EQ) 44:30; R Gliga (PP) 55:19	Referee: M Hicks (United Kingdom)

March 25, 2009; 16:30	South Korea	10–0	Mexico	Tabor Ice Hall; Attendance: 248

	Referee: R Husicka (Czech Republic)
Yoon JM (EQ) 00:18; Ahn JH (EQ) 04:47; Yum JY (EQ) 06:13; Yoon JM (EQ) 10:23; Jung YS (EQ) 15:41; Ahn JH (EQ) 24:13; Yum JY (EQ) 41:17; Yoon JM (PP) 49:30; Kim SH (PP) 53:33; Kang BG (SH) 55:35 / Goals	Referee: R Husicka (Czech Republic)

March 25, 2009; 20:00	Slovenia	8–0	Spain	Tabor Ice Hall; Attendance: 492

	Referee: W Marczuk (Poland)
K Ograjensek (EQ) 02:28; K Ograjensek (SH) 25:00; A Magovac (EQ) 26:00; N Lahajnar (PP) 27:42; K Ograjensek (EQ) 36:57; K Ograjensek (EQ) 41:23; N Lahajnar (EQ) 51:40; N Lahajnar (EQ) 51:51 / Goals	Referee: W Marczuk (Poland)

March 26, 2009; 13:00	Romania	0–8	South Korea	Tabor Ice Hall; Attendance: 211

	Referee: L Cassol (Italy)
Goals / Yoon JM (PP) 18:48; Kim HW (EQ) 28:07; Yum JY (PP) 32:03; Yum JY (SH) 34:27; Yum JY (PP) 42:34; Yum JY (EQ) 44:44; Yoon JM (EQ) 45:02; Lim JS (EQ) 55:08	Referee: L Cassol (Italy)

March 26, 2009; 16:30	Spain	1–9	Croatia	Tabor Ice Hall; Attendance: 269

	Referee: R Husicka (Czech Republic)
O Boronat (PP) 20:21 / Goals / D Kanaet (SH) 05:35; P Trstenjak (EQ) 15:43; B Jutrisa (PP) 25:36; D Kanaet (EQ) 25:49; F Srketic (PP) 27:11; D Kanaet (PP) 29:00; P Trstenjak (EQ) 42:26; I Brencun (EQ) 45:53; L Markovic (PP) 57:49	Referee: R Husicka (Czech Republic)

March 26, 2009; 20:00	Mexico	0–12	Slovenia	Tabor Ice Hall; Attendance: 410

	Referee: M Hicks (United Kingdom)
Goals / A Kuralt (EQ) 00:54; R Leber (PP) 05:30; Z Pesut (EQ) 11:43; D Pungarsek (EQ) 14:05; L Scap (EQ) 17:41; D Pungarsek (EQ) 34:17; N Lahajnar (SH) 36:24; N Lahajnar (EQ) 39:48; M Verlic (SH) 43:30; K Ograjensek (PP) 46:16; A Magovac (PP) 52:39; M Podlipnik (PP) 59:33	Referee: M Hicks (United Kingdom)

March 28, 2009; 13:00	Romania	7–3	Spain	Tabor Ice Hall; Attendance: 256

	Referee: M Hicks (United Kingdom)
R Gliga (PP) 05:02; L Pascaru (EQ) 09:17; T Biro (PP) 17:14; A Imecs (EQ) 28:02; A Imecs (EQ) 34:10; R Gliga (EQ) 45:17; Z Peter (EQ) 45:50 / Goals / I Puyuelo (EQ) 19:12; J Bravo (EQ) 26:04; Z Martinez (PP) 38:43	Referee: M Hicks (United Kingdom)

March 28, 2009; 16:30	Croatia	11–1	Mexico	Tabor Ice Hall; Attendance: 271

	Referee: L Cassol (Italy)
B Jutrisa (PP) 08:04; I Brencun (EQ) 22:20; F Orescanin (EQ) 23:45; L Mikulic (EQ) 25:50; D Kanaet (EQ) 38:22; L Mikulic (EQ) 39:24; B Rendulić (EQ) 42:25; B Rendulić (EQ) 50:01; F Orescanin (PP) 54:38; M Videk (EQ) 55:35; M Blagus (EQ) 56:04 / Goals / Jose Antonio Diez (SH) 59:28	Referee: L Cassol (Italy)

March 28, 2009; 20:00	Slovenia	2–4	South Korea	Tabor Ice Hall; Attendance: 889

	Referee: R Husicka (Czech Republic)
A Kuralt (EQ) 10:30; A Kuralt (PP) 44:23 / Goals / Ahn JH (EQ) 02:19; Ahn JH (EQ) 38:11; Lee BJ (EQ) 57:48; Ahn JH (ENG) 59:33	Referee: R Husicka (Czech Republic)

== Group B ==
The Group B tournament was played in Narva, Estonia at Kreenholm Ice Hall from 16 to 22 March 2009.

=== Final standings ===
Pos	Team	Pld	W	OTW	OTL	L	GF	GA	GD	Pts	Promotion or relegation
1	Great Britain	5	5	0	0	0	46	11	+35	15	Promoted to the 2010 Division I
2	Estonia	5	3	1	0	1	22	14	+8	11	
3	Belgium	5	1	2	1	1	23	19	+4	8	
4	Netherlands	5	2	0	1	2	34	22	+12	7	
5	Serbia	5	1	0	1	3	16	35	−19	4	
6	China	5	0	0	0	5	9	49	−40	0	Relegated to the 2010 Division III

Source: IIHF

=== Results ===
All times are local.

March 16, 2009; 13:00	Serbia	3–4 (SO)	Belgium	Kreenholm Ice Hall; Attendance: 300

	Referee: J Mannikko (Finland)
B Ilic (EQ) 00:53; S Gacic (PP) 41:26; D Flipovic (EQ) 47:56 / Goals / S Bollue (PP) 13:05; N Oerlemans (EQ) 19:40; V Gyesbreghs (PP) 29:45; B Kolodziejczyk (GWG) 65:00	Referee: J Mannikko (Finland)

March 16, 2009; 16:30	Great Britain	16–2	China	Kreenholm Ice Hall; Attendance: 350

	Referee: T Berneker (Austria)
C Long (PP) 05:17; B Davies (PP) 08:18; C Fowler (PP) 14:34; C Fowler (PP) 19:05; B Davies (EQ) 24:59; T Squires (EQ) 25:52; B Davies (EQ) 26:17; T Squires (EQ) 29:52; J Lewis (EQ) 31:10; N Salam (EQ) 37:09; J Lewis (EQ) 42:02; N Salam (PP) 46:52; C Fowler (PP) 47:33; T Squires (EQ) 48:37; B Davies (SH) 51:36; B Davies (EQ) 55:37 / Goals / Liu W (PP) 33:42; Wang Y (EQ) 34:52	Referee: T Berneker (Austria)

March 16, 2009; 20:00	Estonia	5–0	Netherlands	Kreenholm Ice Hall; Attendance: 1,253

	Referee: C Marken (Norway)
A Fedoruk (EQ) 01:03; A Fedoruk (PP) 12:27; R Rooba (PP) 25:35; I Ponomarjov (SH) 27:09; M Gut (EQ) 35:02 / Goals	Referee: C Marken (Norway)

March 17, 2009; 13:00	China	1–6	Serbia	Kreenholm Ice Hall; Attendance: 187

	Referee: G Zviedritis (Latvia)
Hu T (SH) 58:45 / Goals / N Vucurevic (PP) 10:04; D Flipovic (EQ) 14:16; D Flipovic (PP) 19:38; A Despotovic (EQ) 21:09; V Cengeri (EQ) 31:26; N Vucurevic (EQ) 47:50	Referee: G Zviedritis (Latvia)

March 17, 2009; 16:30	Netherlands	4–5 (SO)	Belgium	Kreenholm Ice Hall; Attendance: 250

	Referee: T Berneker (Austria)
J Smid (EQ) 05:56; J van Lijden (EQ) 16:51; L Engwegen (EQ) 27:18; R Jonkers (EQ) 54:31 / Goals / J Engelen (PP) 08:42; B Kolodziejczyk (PP) 52:17; B Kolodziejczyk (PP) 52:38; J Vercammen (EQ) 52:38; V Gyesbreghs (GWG) 65:00	Referee: T Berneker (Austria)

March 17, 2009; 20:00	Great Britain	5–1	Estonia	Kreenholm Ice Hall; Attendance: 1,350

	Referee: J Mannikko (Finland)
C Fowler (EQ) 00:33; C Long (EQ) 21:20; R Farmer (EQ) 23:59; C Fowler (EQ) 30:08; N Salam (PP) 57:00 / Goals / M Borovikov (EQ) 43:59	Referee: J Mannikko (Finland)

March 19, 2009; 13:00	Netherlands	11–2	China	Kreenholm Ice Hall; Attendance: 57

	Referee: G Zviedritis (Latvia)
J van Lijden (EQ) 07:47; M Bastings (EQ) 08:43; J Smid (PP) 31:29; N de Ruijter (EQ) 34:46; L Houkes (EQ) 38:38; L Houkes (PP) 40:40; C Pohlman (SH) 41:28; N de Ruijter (EQ) 51:17; J van Lijden (EQ) 51:35; M Bastings (EQ) 53:49; L Houkes (SH) 59:16 / Goals / Chen L (EQ) 28:49; Li G (PP) 46:01	Referee: G Zviedritis (Latvia)

March 19, 2009; 16:30	Great Britain	10–2	Serbia	Kreenholm Ice Hall; Attendance: 476

	Referee: J Mannikko (Finland)
R Farmer (EQ) 13:01; R Farmer (EQ) 13:18; A Hirst (EQ) 17:29; S Taylor (EQ) 27:55; T Squires (PP) 32:25; N Salam (EQ) 33:24; R Farmer (EQ) 34:37; B Davies (EQ) 37:44; C Long (EQ) 41:27; J Connolly (EQ) 58:38 / Goals / N Vucurevic (EQ) 37:13; N Vucurevic (SH) 39:46	Referee: J Mannikko (Finland)

March 19, 2009; 20:00	Estonia	4–3 (SO)	Belgium	Kreenholm Ice Hall; Attendance: 1,134

	Referee: C Marken (Norway)
M Gut (PP) 33:04; J Medjanoi (EQ) 41:42; J Lukats (PP) 49:03; A Fedoruk (GWG) 65:00 / Goals / B Kolodziejczyk (EQ) 09:33; S Bollue (EQ) 28:47; S Bollue (EQ) 45:24	Referee: C Marken (Norway)

March 20, 2009; 13:00	Serbia	2–14	Netherlands	Kreenholm Ice Hall; Attendance: 100

	Referee: G Zviedritis (Latvia)
N Vucurevic (SH) 13:52; N Vucurevic (EQ) 28:42 / Goals / N de Ruijter (EQ) 02:59; J van Lijden (EQ) 09:47; C Pohlman (SH) 15:33; L Houkes (EQ) 22:54; J van Lijden (PP) 25:08; J Smid (EQ) 30:07; L Houkes (EQ) 34:08; N de Ruijter (EQ) 39:51; L Houkes (EQ) 43:59; D van de Velden (EQ) 44:25; C Pohlman (SH) 46:38; L Houkes (EQ) 51:39; L Engwegen (PP) 58:42; K Gielen (PP) 59:27	Referee: G Zviedritis (Latvia)

March 20, 2009; 16:30	Belgium	1–7	Great Britain	Kreenholm Ice Hall; Attendance: 468

	Referee: C Marken (Norway)
R Devos (EQ) 52:04 / Goals / B Davies (EQ) 05:09; C Long (EQ) 05:44; T Squires (EQ) 22:36; R Farmer (PP) 26:30; C Long (PP) 41:20; C Watson (EQ) 41:36; J Lewis (SH) 50:47	Referee: C Marken (Norway)

March 20, 2009; 20:00	China	3–6	Estonia	Kreenholm Ice Hall; Attendance: 834

	Referee: T Berneker (Austria)
Jia Y (PP) 20:58; Zhang H (EQ) 35:39; Li N (EQ) 55:02 / Goals / R Rooba (EQ) 01:12; A Bostrov (SH) 15:54; A Fedoruk (PP) 27:25; V Sakovits (EQ) 36:21; D Kalenda (PP) 40:55; V Sakovits (EQ) 53:39	Referee: T Berneker (Austria)

March 22, 2009; 13:00	Belgium	10–1	China	Kreenholm Ice Hall; Attendance: 173

	Referee: T Berneker (Austria)
V Gyesbreghs (EQ) 01:19; L Maas (SH) 05:12; V Gyesbreghs (PP) 12:25; B Kolodziejczyk (PS) 17:39; V Gyesbreghs (PP) 21:13; S Merckx (EQ) 25:31; J van Puymbroeck (EQ) 35:00; Q Rondia (PP) 38:20; N Oerlemans (EQ) 45:00; B Kolodziejczyk (PP) 50:36 / Goals / Zhang H (PP) 10:52	Referee: T Berneker (Austria)

March 22, 2009; 16:30	Netherlands	5–8	Great Britain	Kreenholm Ice Hall; Attendance: 120

	Referee: J Mannikko (Finland)
J van Lijden (PP) 06:03; P Boutrs Girgis (EQ) 30:26; O Leenders (PP) 31:48; C Pohlman (PP) 46:49; R Jonkers (PP) 52:32 / Goals / N Salam (PP) 09:33; A Hirst (EQ) 09:53; T Squires (PP) 26:01; J Connolly (PP) 27:12; C Long (PP) 34:42; C Fowler (PP) 47:45; F Goldie (EQ) 48:45; N Salam (ENG) 59:52	Referee: J Mannikko (Finland)

March 22, 2009; 20:00	Estonia	6–3	Serbia	Kreenholm Ice Hall; Attendance: 1,200

	Referee: C Marken (Norway)
M Borovikov (PP) 13:47; R Komi (EQ) 22:41; S Silenko (EQ) 29:26; S Silenko (EQ) 35:36; S Silenko (EQ) 39:18; R Rooba (EQ) 59:56 / Goals / M Mihajlovic (EQ) 50:44; D Flipovic (EQ) 52:29; D Flipovic (PP) 55:28	Referee: C Marken (Norway)

== See also ==
- 2009 IIHF World U18 Championships
- 2009 IIHF World U18 Championship Division I
- 2009 IIHF World U18 Championship Division III
