= 2011–12 Slohokej League season =

2011–12 Slohokej League Season
- League: Slohokej League
- Sport: Ice hockey
- Teams: 7
- Regular-season winner: Maribor
- Champions: Partizan
- Runners-up: Olimpija

Slohokej League seasons
- ← 2010–11

The 2011–12 Slohokej League season was the third and final season of the Slohokej League. Partizan were the defending champions, having won their first title the previous season.

== 2011–12 teams ==
HD Mladi Jesenice vs. HDD Bled at the Podmežakla Hall

Team	City	Arena	Capacity	Founded
Bled	(Slovenia) Bled	Bled Ice Hall	1,000	2010
Maribor	(Slovenia) Maribor	Tabor Ice Hall	1,515	1993
Mladost	(Croatia) Zagreb	Dvorana Velesajam	500	1946
HK Olimpija	(Slovenia) Ljubljana	Tivoli Hall	4,000	2004
Partizan	(Serbia) Belgrade	Pionir Ice Hall	2,000	1946
Slavija	(Slovenia) Ljubljana	Zalog Ice Hall	1,000	1964
Triglav Kranj	(Slovenia) Kranj	Zlato Polje Ice Hall	1,000	1968

== Standings ==
#	Club	GP	W	OTW	OTL	L	GF	GA	PIM	Pts
1.	Maribor	24	16	3	2	3	106	67	460	56
2.	Partizan	24	12	3	2	7	101	63	463	44
3.	Triglav Kranj	24	11	2	1	10	85	84	453	38
4.	Olimpija	24	10	1	2	11	96	100	321	34
5.	Mladost	24	7	3	1	13	90	110	401	28
6.	Slavija	24	6	2	5	11	68	97	533	27
7.	Bled	24	7	1	2	14	86	111	518	25

== Playoffs ==
=== Quarter-finals ===
- Partizan – Bled 2–0 (4–0, 11–1)
- Triglav Kranj – Slavija 2–0 (5–4, 7–4)
- Olimpija – Mladost 2–0 (7–5, 2–1)

Maribor received a bye.

=== Semi-finals ===
- Partizan – Triglav Kranj 2–0 (6–0, 4–1)
- Maribor – Olimpija 0–2 (3–4, 2–3 OT)

=== Third place ===
- Maribor – Triglav Kranj 1–2 (4–2, 5–6 OT, 2–5)

=== Final ===
- Partizan – Olimpija 3–2 (4–2, 0–1, 4–2, 2–5, 6–1)
