= 2009–10 Slohokej League season =

2009–10 Slohokej League Season
- League: Slohokej League
- Sport: Ice hockey
- Teams: 10
- Regular-season winner: Triglav Kranj
- Champions: Maribor
- Runners-up: Partizan

Slohokej League seasons
- 2010–11 →

The 2009–10 Slohokej League season was the first season of the Slohokej League.

The competition was made up of six teams from Slovenia, two teams from Croatia, and one team from Austria and Serbia each. The season was composed of the regular season and the playoffs. In the regular season, each team played triple round-robin with 27 games. The best eight teams of the regular season advanced to the playoffs.

Maribor became the first champions on 2 March 2009.

== Teams ==
Three teams were farm/junior teams from EBEL – Austrian Hockey League teams: HK Olimpija Ljubljana, HD Mladi Jesenice and Junior Graz 99ers.

Team	City	Arena	Capacity	Founded
Bled	(Slovenia) Bled	Bled Ice Hall	1,000	1999
Junior Graz 99ers	(Austria) Graz	Eisstadion Graz Liebenau	4,050	2009
Maribor	(Slovenia) Maribor	Tabor Ice Hall	1,515	1993
Medveščak II	(Croatia) Zagreb	Dvorana Velesajam	500	2003
Mladi Jesenice	(Slovenia) Jesenice	Podmežakla Hall	4,500	1999
Mladost	(Croatia) Zagreb	Dvorana Velesajam	500	1946
Olimpija	(Slovenia) Ljubljana	Tivoli Hall	4,000	2004
Partizan	(Serbia) Belgrade	Pionir Ice Hall	2,000	1946
Slavija	(Slovenia) Ljubljana	Zalog Ice Hall	1,000	1964
Triglav Kranj	(Slovenia) Kranj	Zlato Polje Ice Hall	1,000	1968

== Standings after the regular season ==
The regular season winner was Triglav Kranj.

Rk	Team	GP	W	OTW	OTL	L	GF	GA	PIM	Pts
1.	Triglav Kranj	27	20	0	1	6	116	64	719	61
2.	Mladi Jesenice	27	17	4	1	5	128	61	420	60
3.	Maribor	27	17	2	4	4	112	66	498	59
4.	Partizan	27	18	1	0	8	132	61	593	56
5.	Olimpija	27	13	3	4	7	138	98	310	49
6.	Bled	27	12	2	2	11	108	94	518	42
7.	Medveščak II	27	9	2	0	16	71	105	389	31
8.	Slavija	27	8	0	2	17	81	111	595	26
9.	Junior Graz 99ers	27	5	0	0	22	74	135	820	15
10.	Mladost	27	2	0	0	25	58	223	547	6

== Play-offs ==
Quarterfinals
1	Triglav Kranj	2
8	Slavija	0
4	Partizan	2
5	Olimpija	0
2	Mladi Jesenice	2
7	Medveščak II	0
3	Maribor	2
6	Bled	0

Semifinals
1	Triglav Kranj	0
4	Partizan	2
2	Mladi Jesenice	0
3	Maribor	2

Finals
4	Partizan	0
3	Maribor	2

=== Quarter-finals ===
- Olimpija – Partizan 1–5 (0–2, 0–1, 1–2)
- Partizan – Olimpija 4–3 (1–0, 2–3, 1–0)
- Bled – Maribor 2–7 (2–4, 0–1, 0–2)
- Maribor – Bled 6–2 (2–0, 1–1, 2–1)
- Slavija – Triglav Kranj 1–4 (0–3, 1–0, 0–1)
- Triglav Kranj – Slavija 5–2 (2–1, 1–1, 2–0)
- Mladi Jesenice – Medveščak II 2–1 (2–0, 0–0, 0–1)
- Medveščak II – Mladi Jesenice 3–9 (0–3, 1–4, 2–2)

=== Semi-finals ===
- Triglav Kranj – Partizan 3–4 (0–1, 2–2, 1–1)
- Partizan – Triglav Kranj 5–1 (1–0, 2–1, 2–0)
- Mladi Jesenice – Maribor 1–3 (0–1, 1–0, 0–2)
- Maribor – Mladi Jesenice 3–1 (1–0, 1–0, 1–1)

=== Final ===
- Maribor – Partizan 3–2 (1–1, 0–1, 2–0)
- Partizan – Maribor 2–3 (0–1, 1–0, 1–2)
