= 2021–22 IIHF Continental Cup =

2021–2022 IIHF Continental Cup

Tournament details
- Dates: 24 September 2021 – 6 March 2022
- Teams: 19

Final positions
- Champions: (Poland) Cracovia (1st title)
- Runners-up: (Kazakhstan) Saryarka Karagandy
- Third place: (Denmark) Aalborg Pirates

The 2021–22 Continental Cup was the 24th edition of the IIHF Continental Cup, Europe's second-tier ice hockey club competition organised by International Ice Hockey Federation. The season began on 24 September 2021 and the final tournament was scheduled to be played from 4 to 6 March 2022.

The Polish team Cracovia won the tournament for the first time, thanks to which they got the right to participate in the 2022–23 Champions Hockey League.

== Qualified teams ==
Team	Qualification
Enter in the third round
(Belarus) HK Gomel	2020–21 Belarusian Extraliga runners-up
(Denmark) Aalborg Pirates	2020–21 Metal Ligaen runners-up
(Slovakia) HK Poprad	2020–21 Slovak Extraliga runners-up
(United Kingdom) Sheffield Steelers	2019–20 EIHL season second place
(Kazakhstan) Saryarka Karagandy	2020–21 Kazakhstan Hockey Championship champions
(Poland) Cracovia	2020–21 Polska Hokej Liga runners-up
Enter in the second round
(Hungary) Ferencvárosi TC	2020–21 OB I bajnokság champions
(Italy) Asiago Hockey	2020–21 IHL - Elite champions
(Latvia) HK Olimp/Venta 2002	2020–21 Latvian Hockey Higher League champions
(France) Gothiques d'Amiens	2019–20 Coupe de France winners
(Slovenia) HDD Jesenice	2020–21 Slovenian Ice Hockey League champions
(Ukraine) Sokil Kyiv	2020–21 Ukrainian Hockey League runners-up
Enter in the first round
(Romania) Corona Brașov	2020–21 Romanian Hockey League champions
(Lithuania) Hockey Punks Vilnius	2020–21 Lithuania Hockey League champions
(Croatia) KHL Mladost	2020–21 Croatian Ice Hockey League champions
(Iceland) Skautafélag Akureyrar	2020–21 Icelandic Hockey League champions
(Estonia) Tartu Välk 494	2020–21 Meistriliiga champions
(Serbia) ~~Crvena zvezda~~	2020–21 Serbian Hockey League champions
(Spain) FC Barcelona	2020–21 Liga Nacional de Hockey Hielo champions
(Turkey) Buz Beykoz Istanbul	2020–21 Turkish Ice Hockey Super League champions

== First round ==
=== Group A ===
The Group A tournament was played in Brașov, Romania, from 24 to 26 September 2021.

Pos	Team	Pld	W	OTW	OTL	L	GF	GA	GD	Pts	Qualification
1	(Romania) Corona Brașov (H)	3	3	0	0	0	30	3	+27	9	Second round
2	(Croatia) KHL Mladost	3	2	0	0	1	16	18	−2	6	
3	(Spain) FC Barcelona	3	1	0	0	2	10	14	−4	3	
4	(Turkey) Buz Beykoz Istanbul	3	0	0	0	3	7	28	−21	0	

Source: IIHF
(H) Host

All times are local (UTC+3).

24 September 2021; 14:30	KHL Mladost (Croatia)	2–10 (0–3, 0–3, 2–4)	(Romania) Corona Brașov	Brașov Olympic Ice Rink, Brașov; Attendance: 300

Game reference
4 min	Penalties	4 min
22	Shots	42

24 September 2021; 18:30	FC Barcelona (Spain)	6–2 (2–1, 1–1, 3–0)	(Turkey) Buz Beykoz Istanbul	Brașov Olympic Ice Rink, Brașov; Attendance: 70

Game reference
6 min	Penalties	7 min
38	Shots	23

25 September 2021; 14:30	FC Barcelona (Spain)	3–5 (1–1, 2–0, 0–4)	(Croatia) KHL Mladost	Brașov Olympic Ice Rink, Brașov; Attendance: 20

Game reference
16 min	Penalties	14 min
29	Shots	35

25 September 2021; 18:30	Corona Brașov (Romania)	13–0 (4–0, 4–0, 5–0)	(Turkey) Buz Beykoz Istanbul	Brașov Olympic Ice Rink, Brașov; Attendance: 300

Game reference
56 min	Penalties	45 min
69	Shots	17

26 September 2021; 14:30	Corona Brașov (Romania)	7–1 (2–0, 2–1, 3–0)	(Spain) FC Barcelona	Brașov Olympic Ice Rink, Brașov; Attendance: 350

Game reference
12 min	Penalties	8 min
55	Shots	16

26 September 2021; 18:30	Buz Beykoz Istanbul (Turkey)	5–9 (1–2, 1–4, 3–3)	(Croatia) KHL Mladost	Brașov Olympic Ice Rink, Brașov; Attendance: 35

Game reference
6 min	Penalties	6 min
30	Shots	43

=== Group B ===
The Group B tournament was played in Vilnius, Lithuania, from 24 to 26 September 2021.

Pos	Team	Pld	W	OTW	OTL	L	GF	GA	GD	Pts	Qualification
1	(Estonia) Tartu Välk 494	2	2	0	0	0	14	4	+10	6	Second round
2	(Lithuania) Hockey Punks Vilnius (H)	2	1	0	0	1	15	14	+1	3	
3	(Iceland) Skautafélag Akureyrar	2	0	0	0	2	7	18	−11	0	

Source: IIHF
(H) Host

All times are local (UTC+3).

24 September 2021; 20:00	Hockey Punks Vilnius (Lithuania)	3–8 (1–3, 0–0, 2–5)	(Estonia) Tartu Välk 494	Utenos pramogų arena, Vilnius; Attendance: 409

Game reference
14 min	Penalties	6 min
28	Shots	41

25 September 2021; 17:00	Tartu Välk 494 (Estonia)	6–1 (2–0, 1–1, 3–0)	(Iceland) Skautafélag Akureyrar	Utenos pramogų arena, Vilnius; Attendance: 153

Game reference
8 min	Penalties	6 min
43	Shots	20

26 September 2021; 17:00	Skautafélag Akureyrar (Iceland)	6–12 (2–4, 2–5, 2–3)	(Lithuania) Hockey Punks Vilnius	Utenos pramogų arena, Vilnius; Attendance: 348

Game reference
20 min	Penalties	45 min
29	Shots	39

== Second round ==
=== Group C ===
The Group C tournament was played in Budapest, Hungary, from 22 to 24 October 2021.

Pos	Team	Pld	W	OTW	OTL	L	GF	GA	GD	Pts	Qualification
1	(Latvia) HK Olimp/Venta 2002	3	2	0	0	1	10	7	+3	6 (Note: HK Olimp/Venta 2002 3 Pts, +1 GD; Sokil Kyiv 3 Pts, 0 GD; Ferencvárosi TC 3 Pts, –1 GD)	Third round
2	(Ukraine) Sokil Kyiv	3	2	0	0	1	14	9	+5	6	
3	(Hungary) Ferencvárosi TC (H)	3	2	0	0	1	12	6	+6	6	
4	(Estonia) Tartu Välk 494	3	0	0	0	3	8	22	−14	0	

Source: IIHF
(H) Host
Notes:

All times are local (UTC+2).

22 October 2021; 16:00	Ferencvárosi TC (Hungary)	8–1 (0–1, 5–0, 3–0)	(Estonia) Tartu Välk 494	Tüskecsarnok, Budapest; Attendance: 356

Game reference
12 min	Penalties	58 min
34	Shots	19

22 October 2021; 19:30	HK Olimp/Venta 2002 (Latvia)	4–1 (1–0, 3–1, 0–0)	(Ukraine) Sokil Kyiv	Tüskecsarnok, Budapest; Attendance: 250

Game reference
6 min	Penalties	14 min
19	Shots	31

23 October 2021; 16:00	Ferencvárosi TC (Hungary)	1–4 (0–2, 1–0, 0–2)	(Ukraine) Sokil Kyiv	Tüskecsarnok, Budapest; Attendance: 487

Game reference
12 min	Penalties	10 min
23	Shots	48

23 October 2021; 19:30	HK Olimp/Venta 2002 (Latvia)	5–3 (0–0, 2–2, 3–1)	(Estonia) Tartu Välk 494	Tüskecsarnok, Budapest; Attendance: 93

Game reference
6 min	Penalties	6 min
30	Shots	32

24 October 2021; 15:00	HK Olimp/Venta 2002 (Latvia)	1–3 (0–1, 0–0, 1–2)	(Hungary) Ferencvárosi TC	Tüskecsarnok, Budapest; Attendance: 602

Game reference
8 min	Penalties	12 min
27	Shots	36

24 October 2021; 18:30	Sokil Kyiv (Ukraine)	9–4 (4–0, 4–2, 1–2)	(Estonia) Tartu Välk 494	Tüskecsarnok, Budapest; Attendance: 72

Game reference
8 min	Penalties	6 min
34	Shots	24

=== Group D ===
The Group D tournament was played in Amiens, France, from 22 to 24 October 2021.

Pos	Team	Pld	W	OTW	OTL	L	GF	GA	GD	Pts	Qualification
1	(Italy) Asiago Hockey	3	3	0	0	0	11	7	+4	9	Third round
2	(France) Gothiques d'Amiens (H)	3	2	0	0	1	17	4	+13	6	
3	(Slovenia) HDD Jesenice	3	1	0	0	2	9	13	−4	3	
4	(Romania) Corona Brașov	3	0	0	0	3	2	15	−13	0	

Source: IIHF
(H) Host

All times are local (UTC+2).

22 October 2021; 16:00	Asiago Hockey (Italy)	4–3 (0–0, 3–2, 1–1)	(Slovenia) HDD Jesenice	Coliséum, Amiens; Attendance: 204

Game reference
14 min	Penalties	8 min
28	Shots	30

22 October 2021; 20:15	Gothiques d'Amiens (France)	6–0 (2–0, 1–0, 3–0)	(Romania) Corona Brașov	Coliséum, Amiens; Attendance: 1,300

Game reference
9 min	Penalties	34 min
36	Shots	31

23 October 2021; 16:00	Corona Brașov (Romania)	2–4 (0–2, 0–0, 2–2)	(Italy) Asiago Hockey	Coliséum, Amiens; Attendance: 460

Game reference
16 min	Penalties	15 min
30	Shots	45

23 October 2021; 20:15	Gothiques d'Amiens (France)	9–1 (4–0, 3–1, 2–0)	(Slovenia) HDD Jesenice	Coliséum, Amiens; Attendance: 1,700

Game reference
12 min	Penalties	12 min
37	Shots	34

24 October 2021; 14:00	HDD Jesenice (Slovenia)	5–0 (Forfeit)	(Romania) Corona Brașov	Coliséum, Amiens

24 October 2021; 18:00	Asiago Hockey (Italy)	3–2 (1–0, 2–2, 0–0)	(France) Gothiques d'Amiens	Coliséum, Amiens; Attendance: 1,600

Game reference
23 min	Penalties	12 min
16	Shots	50

== Third round ==
=== Group E ===
The Group E tournament was played in Kraków, Poland, from 19 to 21 November 2021.

Pos	Team	Pld	W	OTW	OTL	L	GF	GA	GD	Pts	Qualification
1	(Kazakhstan) Saryarka Karagandy	3	3	0	0	0	10	2	+8	9	Final round
2	(Poland) Cracovia (H)	3	0	2	0	1	8	8	0	4 (Note: HK Poprad 3–4 (GWS) Cracovia)	Final round
3	(Slovakia) HK Poprad	3	1	0	1	1	6	9	−3	4	
4	(Italy) Asiago Hockey	3	0	0	1	2	6	11	−5	1	

Source: IIHF
(H) Host
Notes:

All times are local (UTC+1).

19 November 2021; 14:00	HK Poprad (Slovakia)	3–1 (1–0, 1–1, 1–0)	(Italy) Asiago Hockey	Adam Roch Kowalski Ice Rink, Kraków; Attendance: 100

Game reference

Tomáš Tomek
Goalies
Gianluca Vallini

Šišovský (Handlovský) – 14:58	1–0
	1–1
Dalhuisen (Svitana, Skokan) – 26:56	2–1
Svitana (Skokan, Brejčák) – 57:24	3–1

4 min
Penalties
10 min
29
Shots
13

19 November 2021; 19:00	Cracovia (Poland)	0–2 (0–1, 0–1, 0–0)	(Kazakhstan) Saryarka Karagandy	Adam Roch Kowalski Ice Rink, Kraków; Attendance: 1,100

Game reference
Denis Perevozchikov	Goalies	Viktor Seliverstov
0–1 / 18:00 – Grymzin; 0–2 / 23:41 – Zelenkov
12 min	Penalties	2 min
18	Shots	38

20 November 2021; 14:00	Saryarka Karagandy (Kazakhstan)	4–2 (3–0, 0–1, 1–1)	(Italy) Asiago Hockey	Adam Roch Kowalski Ice Rink, Kraków; Attendance: 150

Game reference
Viktor Seliverstov	Goalies	Gianluca Vallini
8 min	Penalties	12 min
36	Shots	20

20 November 2021; 19:00	HK Poprad (Slovakia)	3–4 GWS (1–1, 1–1, 1–1) (OT: 0–0) (SO: 0–1)	(Poland) Cracovia	Adam Roch Kowalski Ice Rink, Kraków; Attendance: 1,300

Game reference

Marek Čiliak
Goalies
Denis Perevozchikov

	0–1	04:32 – Ježek
Brejčák (Svitana) – 10:42	1–1
Livingston (Skokan, Svitana) – 20:21	2–1
	2–2	36:33 – Kamiński (Shirley)
Skokan (PS) – 48:01	3–2
	3–3	55:55 – Kapica (Ježek) (PP)

Valigura (miss)
Handlovský
Svitana (miss)
Mešár (miss)
Skokan (miss)
Shootout
Yatsenko
Kapica (miss)
Němec
Gula (miss)
14 min
Penalties
12 min
35
Shots
26

21 November 2021; 14:00	Saryarka Karagandy (Kazakhstan)	4–0 (1–0, 1–0, 2–0)	(Slovakia) HK Poprad	Adam Roch Kowalski Ice Rink, Kraków; Attendance: 250

Game reference

Viktor Seliverstov
Goalies
Tomáš Tomek
Referees:
(Czech Republic) Jakub Šindel
(Norway) Mats Wikstrand
Linesmen:
(Poland) Mateusz Kucharewicz
(Poland) Andrzej Nenko

Borisevich (Belyaev) – 08:33	1–0
Bezrukov (Belyaev) – 20:24	2–0
Anokhovskii (Zelenkov) – 43:12	3–0
Rakhmanov (Anokhovskii) (PP) – 49:41	4–0

10 min
Penalties
33 min
34
Shots
34

21 November 2021; 19:00	Asiago Hockey (Italy)	3–4 OT (0–1, 2–1, 1–1) (OT: 0–1)	(Poland) Cracovia	Adam Roch Kowalski Ice Rink, Kraków; Attendance: 1,500

Game reference
Gianluca Vallini	Goalies	Denis Perevozchikov
12 min	Penalties	33 min
26	Shots	36

=== Group F ===
The Group F tournament was played in Aalborg, Denmark, from 19 to 21 November 2021.

Pos	Team	Pld	W	OTW	OTL	L	GF	GA	GD	Pts	Qualification
1	(Denmark) Aalborg Pirates (H)	3	2	0	0	1	13	7	+6	6 (Note: Aalborg Pirates 3 Pts, +1 GD; HK Gomel 3 Pts, +1 GD; Sheffield Steelers 3 Pts, –2 GD. HK Gomel 2–5 Aalborg Pirates.)	Final round
2	(Belarus) HK Gomel	3	2	0	0	1	9	6	+3	6	Final round
3	(United Kingdom) Sheffield Steelers	3	2	0	0	1	6	7	−1	6	
4	(Latvia) HK Olimp/Venta 2002	3	0	0	0	3	5	13	−8	0	

Source: IIHF
(H) Host
Notes:

All times are local (UTC+1).

19 November 2021; 16:00	HK Gomel (Belarus)	3–1 (2–0, 0–1, 1–0)	(Latvia) HK Olimp/Venta 2002	Gigantium, Aalborg; Attendance: 237

Game reference
16 min	Penalties	16 min
32	Shots	19

19 November 2021; 19:30	Aalborg Pirates (Denmark)	1–3 (0–1, 0–0, 1–2)	(United Kingdom) Sheffield Steelers	Gigantium, Aalborg; Attendance: 752

Game reference
6 min	Penalties	6 min
30	Shots	14

20 November 2021; 16:00	Sheffield Steelers (United Kingdom)	3–2 (1–0, 1–0, 1–2)	(Latvia) HK Olimp/Venta 2002	Gigantium, Aalborg; Attendance: 227

Game reference
10 min	Penalties	12 min
39	Shots	33

20 November 2021; 19:30	HK Gomel (Belarus)	2–5 (1–2, 1–2, 0–1)	(Denmark) Aalborg Pirates	Gigantium, Aalborg; Attendance: 716

Game reference
31 min	Penalties	10 min
21	Shots	41

21 November 2021; 15:00	Sheffield Steelers (United Kingdom)	0–4 (0–1, 0–2, 0–1)	(Belarus) HK Gomel	Gigantium, Aalborg; Attendance: 172

Game reference
8 min	Penalties	8 min
33	Shots	40

21 November 2021; 18:30	HK Olimp/Venta 2002 (Latvia)	2–7 (1–1, 0–2, 1–4)	(Denmark) Aalborg Pirates	Gigantium, Aalborg; Attendance: 816

Game reference
41 min	Penalties	10 min
18	Shots	61

== Final round ==
The final tournament was played in Aalborg, Denmark, from 4 to 6 March 2022.

Pos	Team	Pld	W	OTW	OTL	L	GF	GA	GD	Pts	
1	(Poland) Cracovia	2	2	0	0	0	6	1	+5	6	2022–23 Champions Hockey League
2	(Kazakhstan) Saryarka Karagandy	2	1	0	0	1	5	3	+2	3	
3	(Denmark) Aalborg Pirates (H)	2	0	0	0	2	1	8	−7	0	
4	(Belarus) HK Gomel (Note: HK Gomel was expelled on 1 March 2022 due to the 2022 Russian invasion of Ukraine.)	0	0	0	0	0	0	0	0	0	Expelled

Source: IIHF
(H) Host
Notes:

All times are local (UTC+1).

4 March 2022; 19:00	Cracovia (Poland)	2–1 (0–1, 2–0, 0–0)	(Kazakhstan) Saryarka Karagandy	Gigantium, Aalborg; Attendance: 203

Game reference

Denis Perevozchikov
Goalies
Andrei Shutov
Referees:
(Norway) Roy Stian Hansen
(Slovakia) Peter Stano
Linesmen:
(Denmark) Emil Skov Dalsgaard
(Denmark) Nicklas Knøsen

	0–1	03:47 – Rakhmanov (Anokhovskii, Barbashev)
Popitich (Solovyov) (SH) – 27:10	1–1
Gula (Mishchenko) – 34:45	2–1

4 min
Penalties
4 min
36
Shots
32

5 March 2022; 19:00	Aalborg Pirates (Denmark)	0–4 (0–2, 0–1, 0–1)	(Poland) Cracovia	Gigantium, Aalborg; Attendance: 1,319

Game reference

Frederik Søgaard
Goalies
Denis Perevozchikov
Referees:
(United Kingdom) Liam Sewell
(Slovakia) Peter Stano
Linesmen:
(Denmark) Frederik Andersen
(Denmark) Andreas Weise Krøyer

0–1	07:05 – Shirley (Vorobyov)
0–2	08:10 – Zlobin (Vorobyov)
0–3	20:59 – Ismagilov (Popitich)
0–4	58:18 – Kapica (ENG)

8 min
Penalties
8 min
42
Shots
32

6 March 2022; 19:00	Saryarka Karagandy (Kazakhstan)	4–1 (1–0, 2–0, 1–1)	(Denmark) Aalborg Pirates	Gigantium, Aalborg; Attendance: 569

Game reference

Viktor Seliverstov
Goalies
Georg Sørensen
Referees:
(Norway) Roy Stian Hansen
(United Kingdom) Liam Sewell
Linesmen:
(Denmark) Emil Skov Dalsgaard
(Denmark) Andreas Weise Krøyer

Barbashev (Rakhmanov) – 03:30	1–0
Grymzin – 30:03	2–0
Yakovlev (Grymzin) – 34:53	3–0
	3–1	44:39 – Edmondson (Skinnars, Romig)
Anokhovskiy (Rakhmanov) (ENG) – 59:43	4–1

6 min
Penalties
0 min
22
Shots
12

== See also ==
- 2021–22 Champions Hockey League
