= 2013–14 Slovenian Hockey League season =

The 2013–14 Slovenian Hockey League season was the 23rd season of the Slovenian Hockey League, the top level of ice hockey in Slovenia. Three teams participated in the regular season, which was won by Triglav Kranj. For the playoffs, the top team from the regular season, Triglav Kranj, was joined by HDD Olimpija, which had participated in the Erste Bank Eishockey Liga during the regular season, and Team Jesenice and Slavija, which had both played in the Inter-National League during the regular season. HDD Olimpija won the play-off championship by defeating Team Jesenice in the final.

== Regular season ==
Pl.	Team	GP	W	OTW	OTL	L	Goals	Diff	Pts
1.	Triglav Kranj	8	6	0	2	0	36:16	+20	20
2.	Maribor	8	3	2	0	3	28:20	+8	13
3.	HK Olimpija	8	1	0	0	7	10:38	−28	3

== Playoffs ==
Semifinals
EBEL	HDD Olimpija	2
1.	Triglav Kranj	0
INL	Slavija	0
INL	Team Jesenice	2

Final
EBEL	HDD Olimpija	2
INL	Team Jesenice	0
