= HDD Jesenice =

Slovenian ice hockey team

- City: Jesenice, Slovenia
- Founded: 2014; 12 years ago
- Operated: 2014–2026
- Dissolved: 2026; 0 years ago
- Home arena: Podmežakla Hall
- Colours: Red, white, black
- Affiliates: HD Mladi Jesenice

Championships
- Slovenian Champions: 2015, 2017, 2018, 2021
- Alps Hockey League: 2023

Hokejsko drsalno društvo Jesenice or simply HDD Jesenice was a Slovenian ice hockey team based in Jesenice. Founded in 2014, the club replaced a temporary team called Team Jesenice, which was established in 2013. HDD Jesenice competed in the Inter-National League from 2014 to 2016, before the league merged into the Alps Hockey League. The club won their first Slovenian Championship in the 2014–15 season and as a result qualified for the 2015–16 IIHF Continental Cup. Their home arena was Podmežakla Hall.

== History ==
HDD Jesenice was founded in 2014 and joined the Inter-National League (INL) and the Slovenian Ice Hockey League for the 2014–15 season. The team replaced a temporary team called Team Jesenice, which was founded in 2013 as a successor of HK Acroni Jesenice, a team that was dissolved in 2012 due to financial debt. Team Jesenice was operated by the Ice Hockey Federation of Slovenia during the 2013–14 season, and is not regarded as the same team as HDD Jesenice. In their first Inter-National League season, HDD Jesenice finished the regular season in third place. Going into the playoffs Jesenice was drawn against Slavija for the quarterfinals. They defeated Slavija in four games and advanced to the semifinals against VEU Feldkirch. Jesenice lost the semifinal series in four games. In their first Slovenian Championship season Jesenice finished the regular season in second place, three points behind Olimpija. Following their second-place finish Jesenice advanced straight to the semifinals where they were drawn against the third-placed Triglav Kranj. Jesenice won in two games and progressed to the final against Olimpija. Jesenice won the finals three games to one, winning their first Slovenian Championship title. As a result of winning the 2014–15 Slovenian Championship Jesenice qualified for the 2015–16 IIHF Continental Cup where they entered in the second round. Jesenice was drawn in Group B of the second round against CH Jaca, Miskolci Jegesmedve and Mogo Riga. Jesenice finished the round-robin Group B tournament in third place and failed to qualify for the third round of the tournament. In the same season, Jesenice also competed in the inaugural season of the Slovenian Cup, where they lost in the final against Olimpija.

Jesenice finished the 2015–16 INL regular season in third place, 19 points behind the first-placed VEU Feldkirch. The team advanced to the playoffs where they were drawn against the second-placed EHC Lustenau in the semifinals. Lustenau went on to defeat Jesenice in three games. In the 2015–16 Slovenian Championship season Jesenice finished first in the standings with nine wins from ten games. In the playoffs Jesenice advanced to the finals after defeating Maribor in the quarterfinals and Celje in the semifinals. Jesenice went on to lose the final to Olimpija after five games. In June 2016, the Inter-National League was merged with the Italian Serie A to form the Alps Hockey League (AlpsHL). HDD Jesenice applied as the only Slovenian member and was accepted into the 16-team league.

In the 2016–17 season, Jesenice won their second national title after defeating Olimpija 3–0 in the finals.

== Season-by-season record ==
Season	Competition	GP	W	OTW	OTL	L	GF	GA	Pts	Rank	Playoff	Ref.
2014–15	Inter-National League (first stage)	20	13	1	4	2	110	45	45	3rd	Lost in semifinals	
2014–15	Inter-National League (second stage)	8	4	0	0	4	31	26	14	3rd	Lost in semifinals	
2014–15	Slovenian Hockey Championship^{[a]}	12	10	0	0	2	97	23	30	2nd	Won in finals	
2015–16	Inter-National League	32	18	4	1	9	118	76	63	3rd	Lost in semifinals	
2015–16	Slovenian Hockey Championship^{[a]}	10	9	1	0	0	62	13	32	1st	Lost in finals	
2016–17	Alps Hockey League	40	24	2	2	12	149	98	78	4th	Lost in semifinals	
2016–17	Slovenian Hockey Championship^{[b]}	—	—	—	—	—	—	—	—	—	Won in finals	
2017–18	Alps Hockey League	40	26	4	2	8	171	88	88	3rd	Lost in semifinals	
2017–18	Slovenian Hockey Championship^{[b]}	—	—	—	—	—	—	—	—	—	Won in finals	
2018–19	Alps Hockey League	40	21	1	3	15	173	115	68	8th	Lost in semifinals	
2018–19	Slovenian Hockey Championship^{[a]}	12	9	1	0	2	71	15	29	2nd	Lost in finals	
2019–20	Alps Hockey League	44	20	5	7	12	148	121	77	3rd	Cancelled (COVID-19 pandemic)	
2019–20	Slovenian Hockey Championship^{[a]}	14	11	0	1	2	96	30	34	2nd	Cancelled (COVID-19 pandemic)	
2020–21	Alps Hockey League	30	19	5	1	5	121	74	74	2nd	Lost in semifinals	
2020–21	Slovenian Hockey Championship	14	11	1	0	2	82	15	35	2nd	Won in finals	
2021–22	Alps Hockey League (preliminary round)	29	21	5	1	2	135	58	74	1st	Lost in finals	
2021–22	Alps Hockey League (master round)	9	5	0	0	4	32	30	19	2nd	Lost in finals	
2021–22	Slovenian Hockey Championship	14	12	0	0	2	87	16	36	1st	Lost in semifinals	
2022–23	Alps Hockey League (preliminary round)	28	25	0	0	3	120	32	75	1st	Won in finals	
2022–23	Alps Hockey League (master round)	8	3	0	3	2	19	22	16	2nd	Won in finals	
2022–23	Slovenian Hockey Championship^{[b]}	—	—	—	—	—	—	—	—	—	Lost in finals	
2023–24	Alps Hockey League (preliminary round)	30	14	3	4	9	107	84	52	7th	Did not qualify	
2023–24	Alps Hockey League (qualification round A)	8	3	0	1	4	27	28	16	3rd	Did not qualify	
2023–24	Slovenian Hockey Championship (first phase)	8	7	1	0	0	45	7	23	1st	Lost in finals	
2023–24	Slovenian Hockey Championship (second phase)	6	3	1	0	2	29	17	11	2nd	Lost in finals	
2024–25	Alps Hockey League (preliminary round)	36	19	7	1	9	133	84	72	3rd	Lost in finals	
2024–25	Alps Hockey League (master round)	8	2	1	1	4	23	23	11	4th	Lost in finals	
2024–25	Slovenian Hockey Championship	8	6	0	0	2	46	20	18	2nd	Lost in finals	

=== Other tournaments ===
- 2015–16 IIHF Continental Cup: 3rd in Group B (second round)
- 2015–16 Slovenian Cup: Runners-up
- 2016–17 IIHF Continental Cup: 3rd in Group C (second round)
- 2017–18 Slovenian Cup: Winners
- 2018–19 Slovenian Cup: Runners-up
- 2018–19 IIHF Continental Cup: 2nd in Group B (second round)
- 2019–20 Slovenian Cup: Runners-up
- 2020–21 Slovenian Cup: Winners
- 2021–22 Slovenian Cup: Runners-up
- 2021–22 IIHF Continental Cup: 3rd in Group D (second round)
- 2022–23 Slovenian Cup: Runners-up
- 2022–23 IIHF Continental Cup: 3rd in Group E (third round)
- 2024–25 IIHF Continental Cup: 2nd in Group C (second round)

=== Head coaches ===
- Gorazd Rekelj, 2014
- Roman Pristov, 2014–2015
- Nik Zupančič, 2015
- Dejan Varl, 2015–2016
- Nik Zupančič, 2016–2017
- Gaber Glavič, 2017–2018
- Marcel Rodman, 2018–2019
- Mitja Šivic, 2019–2021
- Nik Zupančič, 2021–2022
- Gaber Glavič, 2022–2024
- Niko Eronen, 2024–2025
- Nik Zupančič, 2025–2026
- Gal Koren, 2026

== Notes ==
a: Matches between Slovenian teams in the Inter-National League and Alps Hockey League counted for the national championship as well.
b: Jesenice joined the competition for the playoffs only.
