= Slovenian Ice Hockey Cup =

National ice hockey cup in Slovenia

The Slovenian Ice Hockey Cup is the national ice hockey cup in Slovenia.

== History ==
Initially, during the 1990s, the Slovenian Cup was awarded to the best team in the first part of the Slovenian Ice Hockey League season. In the 1999–2000 season, the cup was contested for the first time as a single-elimination tournament. However, the final four, which was scheduled to be played at the new Zalog Arena in Ljubljana, was not held. Instead, the winner was declared during the Rudi Hiti Summer League, an annual ice hockey tournament, and was contested by Olimpija and HK Jesenice. The first official and completed season as recognized by the Ice Hockey Federation of Slovenia was contested during the 2015–16 season, and was won by Olimpija. In the next season, the final between Olimpija and HDD Jesenice was not played due to scheduling conflicts.

== List of finals ==
Season	Winners	Runners-up	Score	Venue	Ref.
2015–16	HDD Olimpija	HDD Jesenice	4–0	Podmežakla Hall, Jesenice	
2016–17	Cancelled				
2017–18	HDD Jesenice	HK Olimpija	3–0	Ice Hall, Celje	
2018–19	HK Olimpija	HDD Jesenice	2–1	Zlato Polje Ice Hall, Kranj	
2019–20	HK Olimpija	HDD Jesenice	8–4	Zlato Polje Ice Hall, Kranj	
2020–21	HDD Jesenice	HKMK Bled	7–1	Tivoli Hall, Ljubljana	
2021–22	HK Olimpija	HDD Jesenice	3–1	Bled Ice Hall, Bled	
2022–23	HK Olimpija	HDD Jesenice	4–2	Podmežakla Hall, Jesenice	
