= HK Olimpija Ljubljana =

HK Olimpija Ljubljana may refer to:

- HDD Olimpija Ljubljana, an ice hockey club established in 1928 and folded in 2017
- HK Olimpija, an ice hockey club established in 2004
