= Gašper Krošelj =

Slovenian ice hockey player (born 1987)

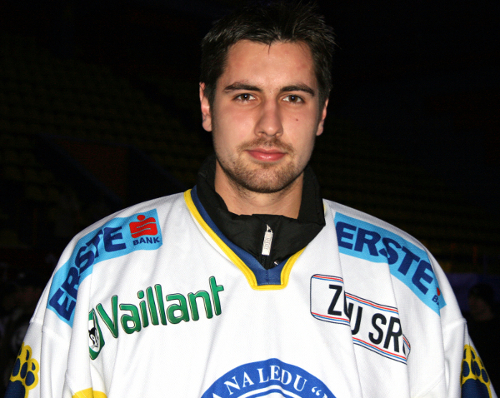
- Krošelj in 2009
- Born: 9 February 1987 (age 39) Ljubljana, SFR Yugoslavia
- Height: 1.88 m (6 ft 2 in)
- Weight: 86 kg (190 lb; 13 st 8 lb)
- Position: Goaltender
- Catches: Left
- Czech team Former teams: BK Mladá Boleslav; HK Slavija Ljubljana; KHL Medveščak Zagreb; Team Zagreb; HK Acroni Jesenice; AaB Ishockey; Herlev Eagles; Sparta Warriors; IK Oskarshamn; AIK IF; Rødovre Mighty Bulls
- National team: Slovenia
- Playing career: 2005–present

Gašper Krošelj (born 9 February 1987) is a Slovenian ice hockey player for BK Mladá Boleslav of the Czech Extraliga (ELH).

He participated at the 2015 IIHF World Championship where he picked up one clean sheet. He also competed in the 2018 Winter Olympics. Since the 2018–2019 season he has played for BK Mladá Boleslav. He played 34 match in the adult national team.
