= Matt Lashoff =

American ice hockey player (born 1986)

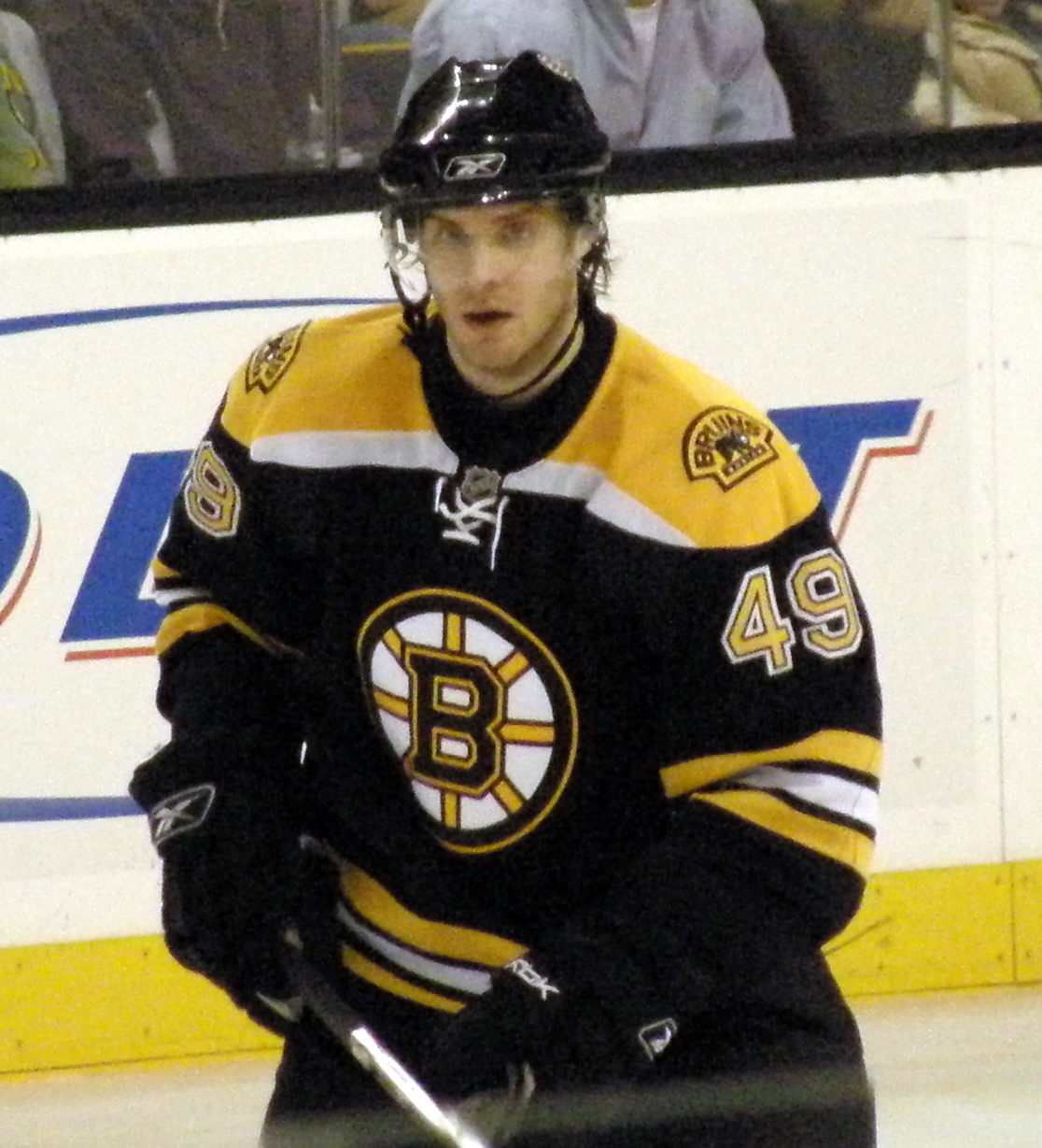
- Lashoff with the Boston Bruins in 2008
- Born: September 29, 1986 (age 39) East Greenbush, New York, U.S.
- Height: 6 ft 2 in (188 cm)
- Weight: 204 lb (93 kg; 14 st 8 lb)
- Position: Defense
- Shoots: Left
- NLA team Former teams: SCL Tigers; Boston Bruins; Tampa Bay Lightning; Toronto Maple Leafs; ZSC Lions; Leksands IF; Metallurg Novokuznetsk; Adler Mannheim
- NHL draft: 22nd overall, 2005; Boston Bruins
- Playing career: 2006–present

Matt Robert Lashoff (born September 29, 1986) is an American professional ice hockey defenseman who is currently playing with the SCL Tigers in the National League A (NLA).

Lashoff was selected by the Boston Bruins in the 1st round (22nd overall) of the 2005 NHL entry draft. He is the older brother of Detroit Red Wings defenseman, Brian Lashoff.

== Playing career ==
As a youth, Lashoff played in the 2000 Quebec International Pee-Wee Hockey Tournament with the New York Rangers minor ice hockey team.

Lashoff prepped at Avon Old Farms School in Avon, Connecticut under famed coach John T. Gardner. He was drafted by the Boston Bruins in the first round, 22nd overall, in the 2005 NHL entry draft. After playing three seasons in the Ontario Hockey League with the Kitchener Rangers, Lashoff made his professional debut at the end of the 2005–06 season with the Bruins' American Hockey League affiliate, the Providence Bruins.

Lashoff made his NHL debut with the Boston Bruins in the 2006–07 season on October 26, 2006. Lashoff scored his first NHL goal December 31, 2007, against Kari Lehtonen of the Atlanta Thrashers.

On April 4, 2007, Lashoff was named to the 2006–07 AHL All-Rookie Team. On March 4, 2009, at the trade deadline for the 2008–09 season, Lashoff was traded by the Bruins, along with Mārtiņš Karsums, to the Tampa Bay Lightning for Mark Recchi and a 2009 second round draft pick.

On August 27, 2010, Lashoff was traded by the Lightning to the Toronto Maple Leafs in exchange for Alex Berry and Stefano Giliati.

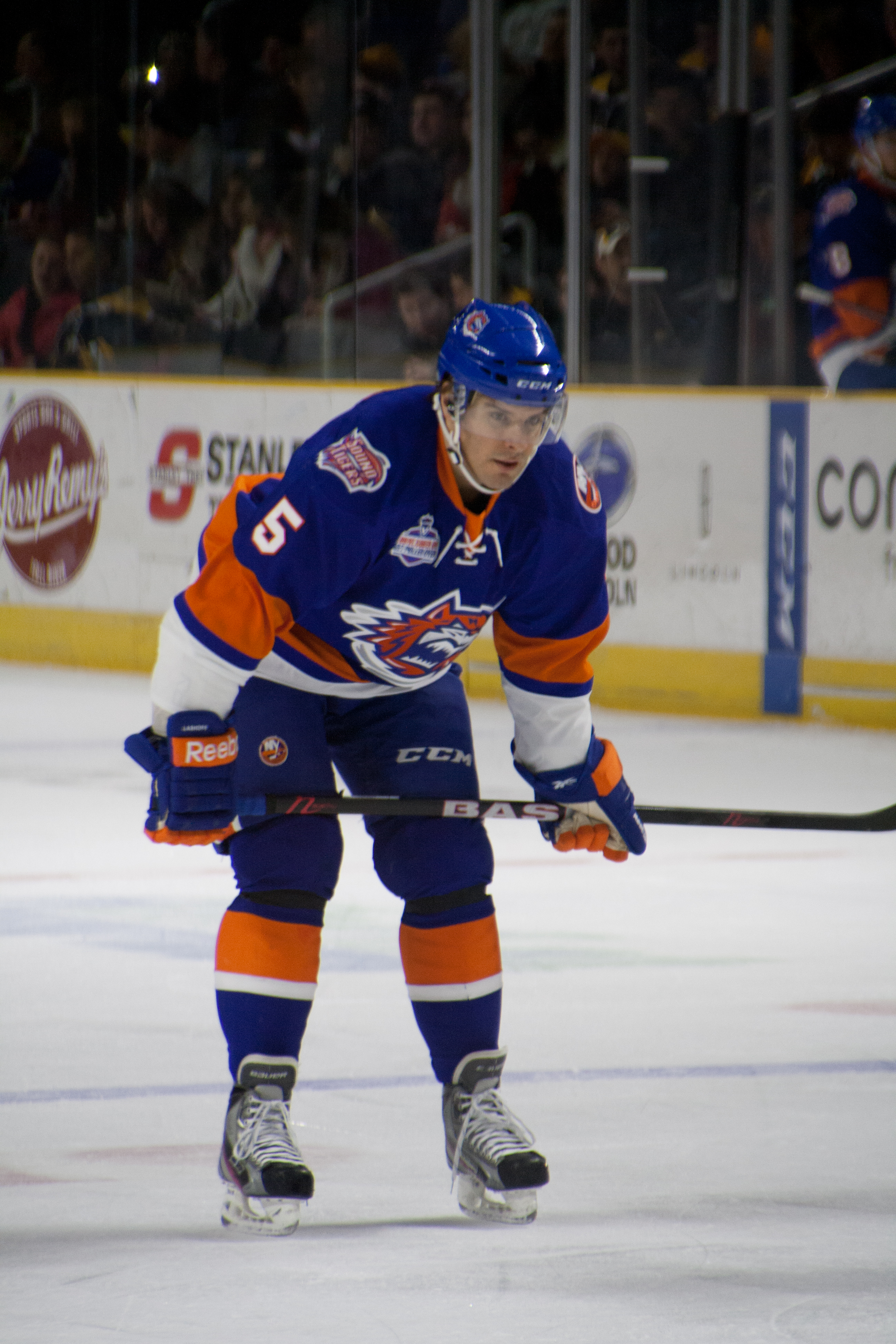
Lashoff during his stint with the Bridgeport Sound Tigers in 2015.

On August 3, 2012, as a free agent, Lashoff signed a try-out contract with European team, ZSC Lions of the Swiss NLA.

After two and a half years abroad in Sweden and Russia, Lashoff left Metallurg Novokuznetsk of the Kontinental Hockey League mid-year in the 2014–15 season, to return to North America to sign an AHL contract for the remainder of the campaign with the Bridgeport Sound Tigers on January 12, 2015. Lashoff appeared in just 11 games with the Tigers before he was traded to the Portland Pirates in exchange for Dyson Stevenson on March 3, 2015.

Lashoff agreed to join the Lehigh Valley Phantoms to begin the season on October 5, 2015. In adding depth to the blueline, Lashoff appeared in 17 games for 2 assists before he was released from his contract. On February 2, 2016, Lashoff inked a contract for the remainder of the 2015–16 season with Adler Mannheim of the German top flight Deutsche Eishockey Liga. He appeared in 3 regular season games before suiting up in two post-season contests, contributing with a goal and 14 penalty minutes.

As a free agent in the following off-season, and having returned to North America from Germany, Lashoff trained and agreed to attend his former club, the Toronto Marlies training camp, in preparation for the 2016–17 season. He was released from his try-out during the pre-season on October 10, 2016. With the season underway, Lashoff belatedly agreed to a professional try-out contract with the San Antonio Rampage of the AHL, affiliate to the Colorado Avalanche, on October 26, 2016. In 19 games with the Rampage, Lashoff led the defense in scoring with 3 goals and 7 points. At the end of his try-out period, the Rampage however opted against another try-out contract concluding his tenure with the team on December 23, 2016. On February 3, 2017, he signed with the SCL Tigers of the National League A for the remainder of the 2016–17 season.

== Music career ==
Lashoff is also a musician. He released his debut album titled "Living on Heart" on May 17, 2011. "Living on Heart" was recorded over a month in the summer of 2010, at various studios in New Jersey and New York, during Lashoff's off season. Producer Loren Harriet approached Lashoff after seeing a segment about his music career on the New England Sports Network channel. Lashoff was surprised by the opportunity and explains, "I didn't think [Harriet] was serious at first [but eventually] he was helping me choose my band which was like an all star team of some of the best studio musicians." Lashoff says his debut album is "bluesy with a pop influence" and cites artists such as Stevie Ray Vaughan, B.B. King and Kenny Wayne Shepherd as his inspiration.

"A lot of people ask me how do you separate the two, but they've always been a part of my lifestyle. When we were kids we would play hockey before school and then after school till it got too dark and our mom told us to come in, then we would eat, play around on the guitar and write songs," says Lashoff. He is now planning a second album with a different sound, that will be "more groove based and not so poppy."

== Career statistics ==
=== Regular season and playoffs ===
			Regular season					Playoffs
Season	Team	League	GP	G	A	Pts	PIM	GP	G	A	Pts	PIM
2001–02	Avon Old Farms	HS-CT	—	—	—	—	—	—	—	—	—	—
2002–03	U.S. NTDP Juniors	NAHL	46	2	5	7	53	—	—	—	—	—
2002–03	U.S. NTDP U17	USDP	16	1	3	4	14	—	—	—	—	—
2003–04	Kitchener Rangers	OHL	62	5	19	24	97	5	0	1	1	0
2004–05	Kitchener Rangers	OHL	44	4	18	22	44	13	0	3	3	18
2005–06	Kitchener Rangers	OHL	56	7	40	47	146	5	1	1	2	12
2005–06	Providence Bruins	AHL	7	1	1	2	6	6	0	0	0	6
2006–07	Providence Bruins	AHL	64	11	25	36	60	—	—	—	—	—
2006–07	Boston Bruins	NHL	12	0	2	2	12	—	—	—	—	—
2007–08	Providence Bruins	AHL	60	9	27	36	79	9	0	4	4	6
2007–08	Boston Bruins	NHL	18	1	4	5	0	—	—	—	—	—
2008–09	Providence Bruins	AHL	33	5	16	21	36	—	—	—	—	—
2008–09	Boston Bruins	NHL	4	0	1	1	4	—	—	—	—	—
2008–09	Norfolk Admirals	AHL	2	0	0	0	2	—	—	—	—	—
2008–09	Tampa Bay Lightning	NHL	12	0	7	7	10	—	—	—	—	—
2009–10	Norfolk Admirals	AHL	68	8	16	24	105	—	—	—	—	—
2009–10	Tampa Bay Lightning	NHL	5	0	0	0	21	—	—	—	—	—
2010–11	Toronto Marlies	AHL	69	7	21	28	137	—	—	—	—	—
2010–11	Toronto Maple Leafs	NHL	11	0	1	1	6	—	—	—	—	—
2011–12	Toronto Marlies	AHL	9	1	4	5	12	8	0	4	4	8
2012–13	ZSC Lions	NLA	49	1	9	10	43	12	0	1	1	14
2013–14	Leksands IF	SHL	40	0	6	6	58	3	0	0	0	4
2014–15	Metallurg Novokuznetsk	KHL	23	0	2	2	14	—	—	—	—	—
2014–15	Bridgeport Sound Tigers	AHL	11	1	3	4	22	—	—	—	—	—
2014–15	Portland Pirates	AHL	14	0	0	0	17	—	—	—	—	—
2015–16	Lehigh Valley Phantoms	AHL	17	0	2	2	28	—	—	—	—	—
2015–16	Adler Mannheim	DEL	3	0	0	0	4	2	1	0	1	14
2016–17	San Antonio Rampage	AHL	19	3	4	7	24	—	—	—	—	—
2016–17	SCL Tigers	NLA	2	0	1	1	2	—	—	—	—	—
AHL totals			373	46	120	166	528	23	0	8	8	20
NHL totals			74	1	15	16	59	—	—	—	—	—

== Awards and honours ==
Award	Year
OHL
Second All-Rookie Team	2004
CHL Top Prospects Game	2005
AHL
All-Star Game	2007, 2008
All-Rookie Team	2007

Awards and achievements
Preceded by Mark Stuart	Boston Bruins first-round draft pick 2005	Succeeded by Phil Kessel
