= Stefano Giliati =

Canadian ice hockey player

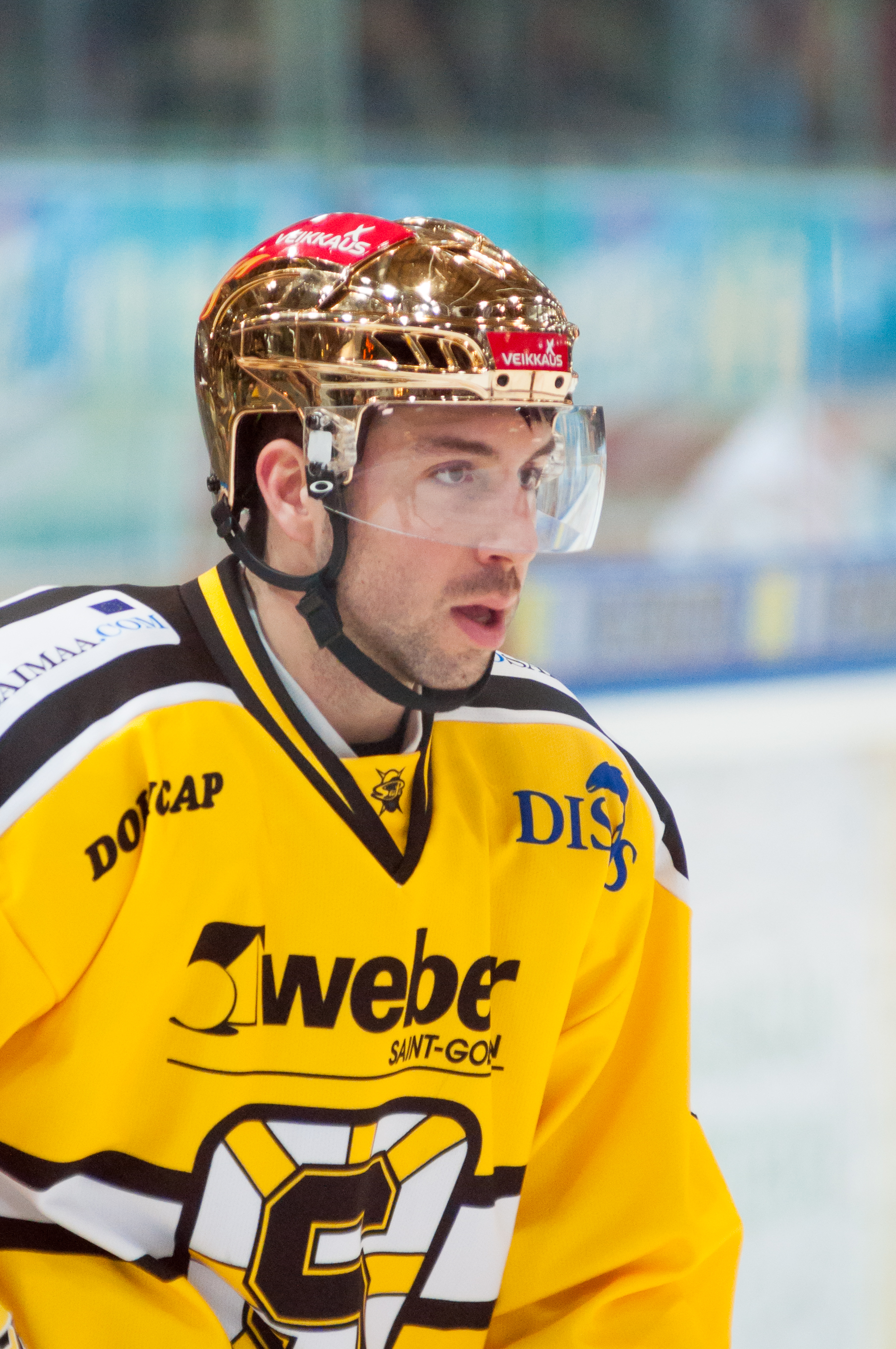
- Born: October 7, 1987 (age 38) Montreal, Quebec, Canada
- Height: 5 ft 11 in (180 cm)
- Weight: 198 lb (90 kg; 14 st 2 lb)
- Position: Left wing
- Shoots: Left
- ECHL team Former teams: Fort Wayne Komets; Toronto Marlies; Norfolk Admirals; SaiPa; Espoo Blues; KHL Medveščak Zagreb; HC Davos; Schwenninger Wild Wings; SCL Tigers; HC Bolzano; Asiago HC
- National team: Italy
- NHL draft: Undrafted
- Playing career: 2008–present

Stefano Giliati (born October 7, 1987) is a Canadian-born Italian professional ice hockey left wing who plays currently for the Fort Wayne Komets in the ECHL.

== Playing career ==
Giliati played major junior hockey in the Quebec Major Junior Hockey League with the Shawinigan Cataractes and the Lewiston MAINEiacs.

Originally signed as a free agent by the Toronto Maple Leafs, on August 27, 2010, Giliati was traded by the Maple Leafs (along with Alex Berry) to the Tampa Bay Lightning in exchange for Matt Lashoff.

At the conclusion of his entry-level contract, and released as a free agent by the Lightning, Giliati opted to pursue a career abroad in signing with Italian club, HC Bolzano of the Serie A. Of Italian heritage, Giliati spent a single season with HCB in Italy, helping claim the Italian Championship, before leaving for the Finnish Liiga with SaiPa. After two seasons with SaiPa, Giliati transferred to fellow Finnish club, Espoo Blues on a one-year contract on April 28, 2014. Giliati scored his first goal for Blues on September 20, 2014 in a 5-4 away loss to Oulun Kärpät.

On July 13, 2015, Giliati left Finland as a free agent to sign a two-year deal with Croatian-based KHL entrant, KHL Medveščak Zagreb. He left Zagreb after one year and headed to Switzerland, where he played in three games for HC Davos of the National League A (NLA) at the beginning of the 2016-17 campaign. In October 2016, he transferred to the Schwenninger Wild Wings of the German top-flight Deutsche Eishockey Liga (DEL).

In his third season with the Wild Wings in 2018–19 and with the club well out of playoff contention, Giliati left in the final season of his contract to sign for the remainder of the year with Swiss outfit, the SCL Tigers of the NL, on February 7, 2019.

After 11 European seasons, Giliati opted to return to North America in agreeing to a one-year contract with the Fort Wayne Komets of the ECHL for the 2022–23 season on July 21, 2022.

== Career statistics ==
=== Regular season and playoffs ===
			Regular season					Playoffs
Season	Team	League	GP	G	A	Pts	PIM	GP	G	A	Pts	PIM
2004–05	Shawinigan Cataractes	QMJHL	54	9	5	14	23	3	0	0	0	2
2005–06	Lewiston Maineiacs	QMJHL	70	21	28	49	72	6	2	0	2	6
2006–07	Lewiston Maineiacs	QMJHL	68	24	33	57	73	17	4	11	15	22
2007–08	Lewiston Maineiacs	QMJHL	65	40	47	87	103	6	1	3	4	10
2007–08	Toronto Marlies	AHL	1	0	0	0	0	13	0	1	1	0
2008–09	Toronto Marlies	AHL	53	6	9	15	16	—	—	—	—	—
2009–10	Reading Royals	ECHL	46	23	32	55	76	13	4	4	8	18
2009–10	Toronto Marlies	AHL	25	3	6	9	8	—	—	—	—	—
2010–11	Norfolk Admirals	AHL	69	7	14	21	39	6	1	0	1	0
2011–12	HC Bolzano	ITL	40	17	34	51	42	12	5	10	15	26
2012–13	SaiPa	SM-l	53	18	18	36	107	3	0	0	0	2
2013–14	SaiPa	Liiga	35	4	14	18	78	13	2	5	7	12
2013–14	SaPKo	Mestis	2	0	0	0	2	—	—	—	—	—
2014–15	Espoo Blues	Liiga	56	17	23	40	79	4	0	2	2	6
2015–16	KHL Medveščak Zagreb	KHL	53	8	8	16	65	—	—	—	—	—
2016–17	HC Davos	NLA	3	0	2	2	0	—	—	—	—	—
2016–17	Schwenninger Wild Wings	DEL	22	6	5	11	12	—	—	—	—	—
2017–18	Schwenninger Wild Wings	DEL	49	14	12	26	34	2	0	0	0	8
2018–19	Schwenninger Wild Wings	DEL	38	5	11	16	87	—	—	—	—	—
2018–19	SCL Tigers	NL	1	0	2	2	0	2	0	3	3	0
2019–20	HC Bolzano	EBEL	46	12	17	29	26	3	1	3	4	4
2020–21	HC Bolzano	ICEHL	41	8	15	23	18	16	0	3	3	10
2021–22	Asiago HC	AlpsHL	34	15	22	37	14	10	2	7	9	10
2022–23	Fort Wayne Komets	ECHL	34	7	17	24	39	—	—	—	—	—
AHL totals			148	16	29	45	63	19	1	1	2	0

=== International ===
Year	Team	Event	Result	GP	G	A	Pts	PIM
2021	Italy	WC	16th	7	1	0	1	18
2021	Italy	OGQ	NQ	3	0	0	0	2
Senior totals				10	1	0	1	20
