= Ciaran Long =

- Born: 9 February 1986 (age 40) Birmingham, England
- Height: 1.90 m (6 ft 3 in)
- Weight: 91 kg (201 lb; 14 st 5 lb)
- Position: Left wing
- Shoots: Right
- EIHL team Former teams: Belfast Giants; Swindon Wildcats; Basingstoke Bison; Slough Jets; Manchester Phoenix; Manchester Minotaurs; Canterbury Red Devils; Manchester Storm
- National team: Great Britain
- NHL draft: Undrafted
- Playing career: 2006–present

Ciaran Long (born 9 February 1986) is an English ice hockey player for Belfast Giants and the British national team.

He represented Great Britain at the 2021 IIHF World Championship.
