= Lorenzo Casetti =

Italian ice hockey player

- Born: 14 September 1993 (age 32) Trento, Italy
- Height: 1.90 m (6 ft 3 in)
- Weight: 90 kg (198 lb; 14 st 2 lb)
- Position: Defence
- Shoots: Left
- AlpsHL team Former teams: Asiago Hockey; EV Bozen 84; Hockey Pergine; HC Bozen–Bolzano
- National team: Italy
- NHL draft: Undrafted
- Playing career: 2012–present

Lorenzo Casetti (born 14 September 1993) is an Italian ice hockey player for Asiago Hockey and the Italian national team.

He represented Italy at the 2021 IIHF World Championship.
