= Joseph Lewis (ice hockey) =

British ice hockey player

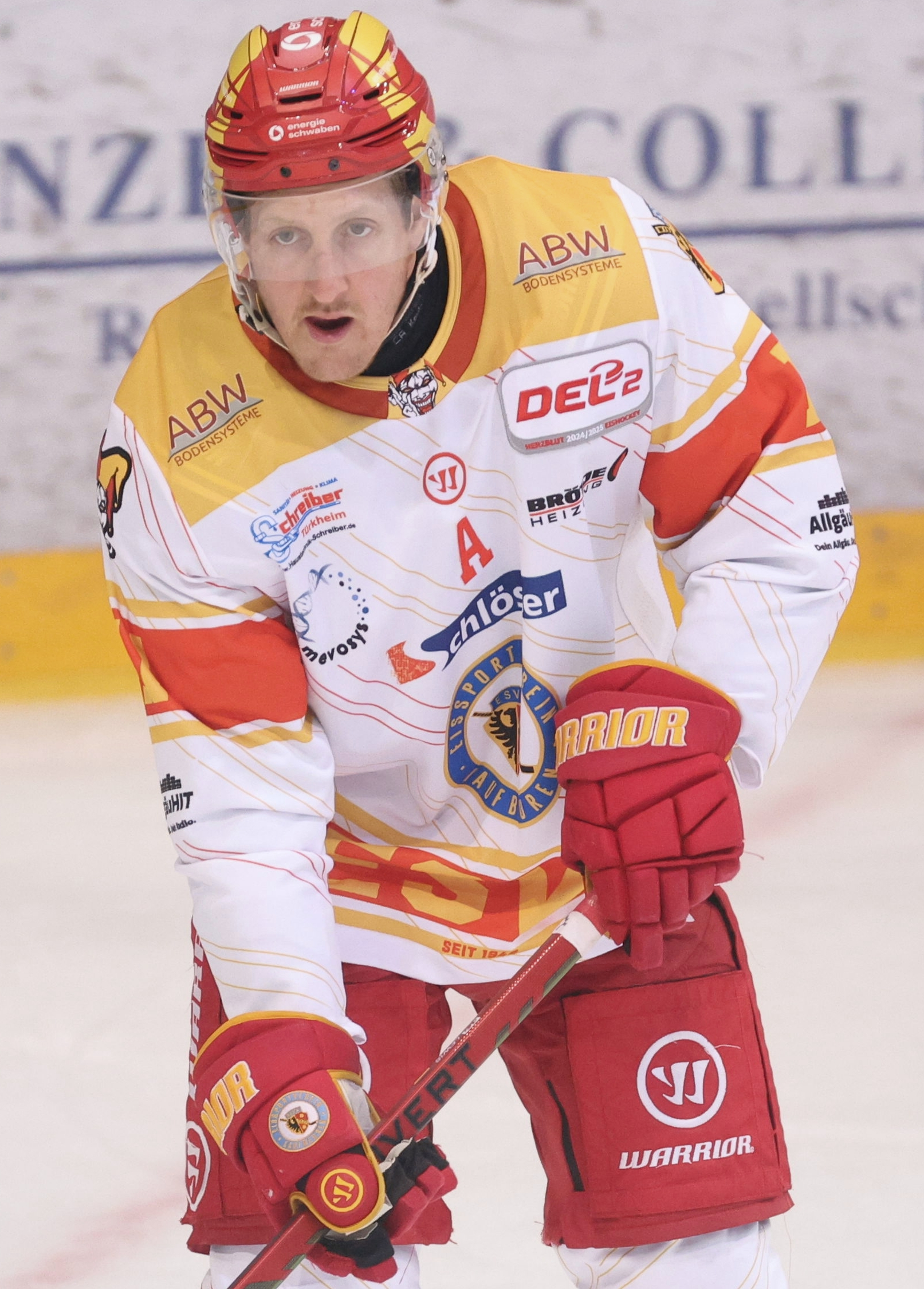
- Born: 26 July 1992 (age 32); Newport, Wales
- Height: 1.74 m (5 ft 9 in)
- Weight: 80 kg (176 lb; 12 st 8 lb)
- Position: Forward
- Shoots: Right
- DEL2 team Former teams: ESV Kaufbeuren; Swindon Wildcats; Füchse Duisburg; Hammer Eisbären; EC Bad Tölz; Heilbronner Falken; Starbulls Rosenheim
- National team: Great Britain
- NHL draft: Undrafted
- Playing career: 2008–present

Joseph Lewis (born 26 July 1992) is a British ice hockey player for ESV Kaufbeuren and the British national team.

He represented Great Britain at the 2019 IIHF World Championship.
