= Team Zagreb =

Ice hockey team

- City: Zagreb, Croatia
- League: Slohokej League (2010–2011)
- Founded: 2010; 16 years ago
- Folded: 2011; 15 years ago
- Home arena: Dvorana Velesajam (capacity: 500)
- Colours: Blue and White

Team Zagreb was a Croatian hockey team. It was founded in 2010, with the aim to concentrate the best hockey players in Zagreb into one team. The club replaced KHL Mladost and KHL Medveščak in the 2010–11 Slohokej League season.
