= Jiří Gula =

Czech ice hockey player

- Born: 7 August 1989 (age 35); Most, Czechoslovakia
- Height: 6 ft 3 in (191 cm)
- Weight: 212 lb (96 kg; 15 st 2 lb)
- Position: Defence
- Shoots: Right
- Played for: HC Most; HC Litvínov; SK Horácká Slavia Třebíč; HC Stadion Litoměřice; HC Slovan Ústečtí Lvi; Sheffield Steelers; HK Dukla Trencin; KS Cracovia
- Playing career: 2010–present

Jiří Gula (born 7 August 1989) is a Czech professional ice hockey defenceman currently playing for the KS Cracovia. He previously played with HC Litvínov in the Czech Extraliga.

== Career statistics ==
			Regular season					Playoffs
Season	Team	League	GP	G	A	Pts	PIM	GP	G	A	Pts	PIM
2004–05	HC Litvinov U18	Czech U18	42	1	1	2	32	2	0	0	0	0
2005–06	HC Litvinov U18	Czech U18	43	2	5	7	100	—	—	—	—	—
2006–07	HC Chemopetrol U20	Czech U20	36	2	4	6	66	—	—	—	—	—
2007–08	HC Litvinov U20	Czech U20	43	1	7	8	42	2	0	0	0	2
2008–09	HC Litvinov U20	Czech U20	45	5	8	13	42	9	3	1	4	12
2008–09	HC Most	Czech2	1	0	0	0	0	—	—	—	—	—
2009–10	HC Litvinov U20	Czech U20	—	—	—	—	—	1	0	0	0	2
2009–10	HC Litvinov	Czech	1	0	0	0	0	5	0	0	0	6
2009–10	SK Horácká Slavia Třebíč	Czech2	27	0	7	7	26	11	0	2	2	16
2010–11	HC Litvinov	Czech	48	0	1	1	14	8	1	0	1	6
2010–11	HC Stadion Litoměřice	Czech2	6	0	0	0	6	—	—	—	—	—
2010–11	HC Slovan Ústečtí Lvi	Czech2	2	0	0	0	4	—	—	—	—	—
2011–12	HC Litvinov	Czech	38	1	2	3	26	—	—	—	—	—
2011–12	HC Stadion Litoměřice	Czech2	9	0	0	0	4	—	—	—	—	—
2012–13	HC Litvinov	Czech	47	0	2	2	79	7	0	0	0	8
2012–13	HC Stadion Litoměřice	Czech2	1	0	0	0	2	—	—	—	—	—
2013–14	HC Litvinov	Czech	42	1	2	3	36	—	—	—	—	—
2014–15	HC Litvinov	Czech	21	2	1	3	22	11	2	0	2	6
2014–15	HC Most	Czech2	7	0	0	0	4	—	—	—	—	—
2015–16	HC Litvinov	Czech	39	3	4	7	51	—	—	—	—	—
2015–16	HC Most	Czech2	3	0	0	0	2	—	—	—	—	—
2016–17	HC Litvinov	Czech	52	2	5	7	34	5	0	1	1	4
2017–18	HC Litvinov	Czech	50	1	7	8	52	—	—	—	—	—
2018–19	Sheffield Steelers	EIHL	15	0	2	2	4	—	—	—	—	—
2018–19	HK Dukla Trencin	Slovak	25	3	3	6	14	6	0	0	0	2
2019–20	Cracovia Krakow	Poland	44	12	13	25	36	7	2	2	4	4
2020–21	Cracovia Krakow	Poland	36	4	16	20	28	17	1	3	4	4
2021–22	Cracovia Krakow	Poland	40	6	21	27	30	6	1	0	1	4
2022–23	Cracovia Krakow	Poland	38	7	20	27	24	13	3	6	9	4
Czech totals			338	10	24	34	314	36	3	1	4	30
Poland totals			158	29	70	99	118	43	7	11	18	16
