= Viktor Seliverstov =

Russian politician

- Виктор Селиверстов
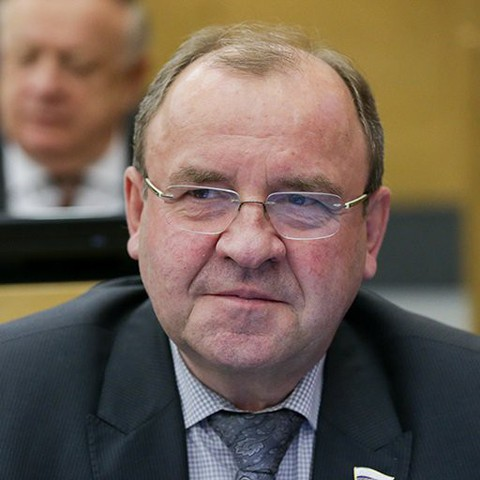

Deputy of the 8th State Duma
- Incumbent
- Assumed office 19 September 2021

Personal details
- Born: 2 August 1954 (age 72) Podilsk, Odesa Oblast, Ukrainian SSR, USSR
- Party: United Russia
- Education: Simferopol Higher Military-Political Construction School

Victor Seliverstov (Russian: Виктор Валентинович Селиверстов, Ukrainian: Віктор Валентинович Селіверстов; August 2, 1954, Podilsk, Odesa Oblast) is a Russian political figure and deputy of the 7th and 8th State Dumas.

From 1971 to 1998, Seliverstov served at the Soviet Armed Forces and, later, Russian Armed Forces. From 1998 to 2004, he worked as Deputy Prefect of the North-Western Administrative Okrug of Moscow. In 2004-2012, Seliverstov headed the regional executive committee in the Moscow city regional branch of the United Russia. On October 11, 2009, he was elected deputy of the Moscow City Duma of the 5th convocation. From 2012 to 2014, Seliverstov worked at the Presidential Administration of Russia. In 2014-2016, he headed the regional branch of the All-Russia People's Front. On September 18, 2016, he was elected deputy of the 7th State Duma. In 2021, Seliverstov was re-elected for the 8th State Duma from the Moscow constituency.

== Sanctions ==
He was sanctioned by the UK government in 2022 in relation to the Russo-Ukrainian War.

He is one of the members of the State Duma the United States Treasury sanctioned on 24 March 2022 in response to the 2022 Russian invasion of Ukraine.
