= Ice Hockey Federation of Slovenia =

Governing body of ice hockey in Slovenia

Slovenia
- Association name: Ice Hockey Federation of Slovenia
- IIHF Code: SLO
- Founded: 1946
- IIHF membership: May 6, 1992
- President: Matjaž Rakovec
- IIHF men's ranking: 15 (▲2) (26 May 2025)
- IIHF women's ranking: 21 (21 April 2025)

The Ice Hockey Federation of Slovenia (Slovene: Hokejska zveza Slovenije, HZS) is the governing body of ice hockey in Slovenia. Slovenia was one of ten nations to join the International Ice Hockey Federation on May 6, 1992, the largest number of nations to join in one day in the history of the organization.
