= HDD Bled =

- City: Bled, Slovenia
- Founded: 2010; 16 years ago
- Home arena: Bled Ice Hall
- Colours: Black, red, yellow
- Website: rudi-hiti.si

Hokejsko drsalno društvo Bled or simply HDD Bled is an ice hockey club from Bled, Slovenia. It was founded in 2010 and currently competes only with junior selections.

A match between HD Mladi Jesenice and HDD Bled during the 2011–12 Slohokej League season
