= HD Mladi Jesenice =

Slovenian ice hockey club

HD Jesenice
- City: Jesenice, Slovenia
- League: Alps Hockey League; Slovenian Championship
- Founded: 1998; 28 years ago
- Operated: 1998–present
- Home arena: Podmežakla Hall
- Colours: Red, black, white
- Head coach: Martin Ekrt
- Website: hdjesenice.si

Hokejsko društvo Mladi Jesenice, commonly referred to as HD Mladi Jesenice, is a Slovenian ice hockey team. In the past, the team was known as HIT Casino Kranjska Gora and Hidria Jesenice due to sponsorship reasons. They were a farm team for HK Jesenice until 2012, when HK Jesenice was dissolved, and later served as a youth team of HDD Jesenice. Their home arena is Podmežakla Hall.

Before the 2026–27 season, they took over the HDD Jesenice senior team, as the club was facing financial difficulties, and joined the Alps Hockey League under the name HD Jesenice.

A match between HD Mladi Jesenice and HDD Bled during the 2011–12 Slohokej League season

== Players ==
=== NHL alumni ===
Since its foundation, the club has graduated one player who has played in the NHL.

- Anže Kopitar
