= Podmežakla Hall =

Indoor sporting arena in Slovenia

- Dvorana Podmežakla
- Interactive map of Podmežakla Hall
- Location: Jesenice, Slovenia
- Coordinates: 46.4330656°N 14.050312°E
- Operator: Zavod za šport Jesenice
- Capacity: 4,500
- Surface: ice
- Field size: 61 x 30 m

Construction
- Opened: 1978
- Renovated: 1997, 2013
- Expanded: 2009–2011

Podmežakla Hall (Dvorana Podmežakla) is an indoor sporting arena located in Jesenice, Slovenia. It is the home of the HD Jesenice ice hockey team. It is also the site of the Triglav Trophy, an annual international figure skating competition held each spring. The name Podmežakla (literally 'below Mežakla') is derived from its location on the southwest bank of the Sava Dolinka, directly below the Mežakla Plateau.

HD Mladi Jesenice vs. HDD Bled in the 2011–12 Slohokej League season

== History ==
The hall was opened in 1978 and was expanded between 2009 and 2011. In March 2011, the hall was closed after inspectors found that the ice hockey club was allowed to host spectators in the newly built east stand without official state permission. The state inspectors also found that the Municipality of Jesenice did not obtain a building permit during the last major renovation in 1997.

The hall was renovated in 2013 for the purposes of EuroBasket 2013.
