= HDK Maribor =

Slovenian ice hockey club

- City: Maribor, Slovenia
- League: Ö Eishockey Liga; Slovenian Championship
- Founded: 1993; 33 years ago
- Operated: 1993–present
- Home arena: Tabor Ice Hall
- Colours: Black, white
- Head coach: Jure Verlič
- Website: lisjaki.net

Championships
- Slohokej League: 2010

Hokejsko drsalni klub Maribor or simply HDK Maribor, also named Lisjaki (English: The Foxes), is an ice hockey club from Maribor, Slovenia. Established in 1993, they play their home matches at the Tabor Ice Hall.

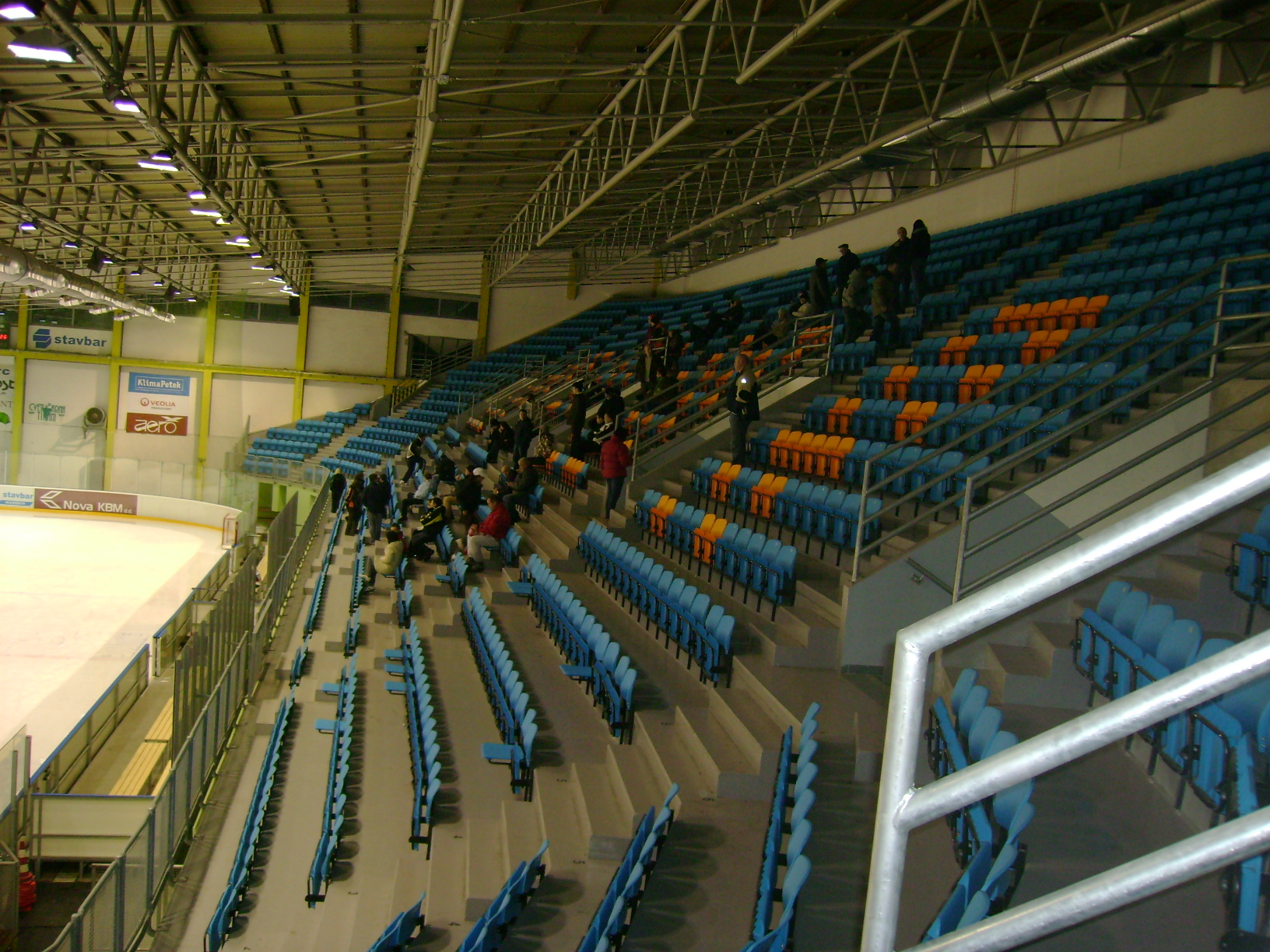
Main stand of the Tabor Ice Hall

== Honours ==
- Slohokej League

Winners: 2009–10

== Players ==
=== NHL alumni ===
Since its foundation, the club has graduated one player who has played in the NHL.

- Jan Muršak
