= HK Olimpija =

Slovenian ice hockey club

Olimpija Ljubljana
- City: Ljubljana, Slovenia
- League: ICE Hockey League; Slovenian Championship
- Founded: 2004; 22 years ago
- Home arena: Tivoli Hall
- Colours: Green, white, black
- Head coach: Ben Cooper
- Captain: Jan Urbas
- Website: hkolimpija.si

Franchise history
- 2004–present: HK Olimpija

Championships
- Slovenian League: 6 (2019, 2022, 2023, 2024, 2025, 2026)
- Alps Hockey League: 2 (2019, 2021)

Hokejski klub Olimpija Ljubljana (English: Olimpija Ljubljana Hockey Club) is a professional ice hockey club from Ljubljana, Slovenia. The club competes in the ICE Hockey League and the Slovenian Championship. Founded in 2004 as a farm team of HDD Olimpija, the club turned professional in 2017 after HDD Olimpija folded. Olimpija has won the Slovenian Championship six times, most recently in 2026, and the Alps Hockey League twice, in 2019 and 2021. They play their home games at Tivoli Hall.

== History ==
HK Olimpija was founded in 2004 with the primary task of educating young players and promoting ice hockey in Ljubljana and its surroundings.

The history of ice hockey in Ljubljana dates back to 1928, when SK Ilirija was founded. In 1932, they played the first official ice hockey match in Slovenia. The club changed its name several times before becoming Olimpija in 1962. HDD Olimpija was dissolved in 2017. After the dissolution, HK Olimpija reassembled the professional team.

In addition to the men's professional team, the club also has a women's team. They won six consecutive national titles between 2016–17 and 2021–22.

=== Early years (2004–2017) ===
Initially, the club focused on developing young players. As a farm team of HDD Olimpija, they played in the Slovenian League for several seasons, finishing third as their best result in the 2010–11 season.

=== Successes with a professional team (2017–2021) ===
In the 2017–18 season, the newly established professional team played its inaugural season in the Alps Hockey League and finished as runners-up in the Slovenian League and the Slovenian Cup. In 2018–19, Olimpija won the "treble" after winning all three competitions in which they participated: the Alps Hockey League, the Slovenian League and the Slovenian Cup. The following season they won the Cup again, while the other two competitions were cancelled due to the COVID-19 pandemic. In the 2020–21 season, Olimpija defended the AHL title and became the first club to win the competition multiple times. However, they failed to defend the national title, narrowly losing 3–2 in the final against their rivals HDD Jesenice.

=== Return of ICE Hockey League to Ljubljana (2021–present) ===
In the 2021–22 season, Olimpija joined the international ICE Hockey League, where HDD Olimpija previously played until 2017.

== Club identity ==
=== Colours and badge ===
Olimpija's traditional colours in all sports are green and white. These two colours are consistent with the colours of the flag of Ljubljana. The club plays home matches in mostly green uniforms, while the away kits are predominantly white. The badge represents a dragon, holding an ice hockey stick. The dragon is also the city's symbol, representing power, courage and wisdom. Derived from the city symbols, Olimpija's nicknames are Zmaji (The Dragons) and Zeleno-beli (The Green and Whites).

=== Supporters and rivalries ===
Tivoli Hall

In addition to fans from Central Slovenia and other parts of the country, Olimpija has two official supporters groups. Ledeni zmaji (The Ice Dragons) are exclusively fans of the ice hockey club, while the Green Dragons mostly attend football matches of NK Olimpija and attend the most important matches and derbies of HK Olimpija.

HK Olimpija's main rivals are HDD Jesenice. The matches between the two sides are referred to as the "Eternal Derby" (Slovene: Večni derbi). Both clubs and their predecessors from the same cities have contested over 500 matches against each other.

== Arena ==
The team play their home matches at Tivoli Hall, a 6,800 all-seated ice hall in Ljubljana. The hall opened in 1965 and was most recently renovated in 2020.

== Honours ==
- Slovenian Championship

Winners (6): 2018–19, 2021–22, 2022–23, 2023–24, 2024–25, 2025–26
Runners-up (2): 2017–18, 2020–21

- Alps Hockey League

Winners (2): 2018–19, 2020–21

- Slovenian Cup

Winners (4): 2018–19, 2019–20, 2021–22, 2022–23
Runners-up (1): 2017–18
