= 1984–85 Yugoslav Ice Hockey League season =

1984–1985 season of the Yugoslav Ice Hockey League

The 1984–85 Yugoslav Ice Hockey League season was the 43rd season of the Yugoslav Ice Hockey League, the top level of ice hockey in Yugoslavia. Eight teams participated in the league, and Jesenice won the championship.

== First round ==
	Club	GP	GF	GA	Pts
1.	Red Star	14	120	37	27
2.	Jesenice	14	109	36	24
3.	Olimpija	14	99	42	20
4.	Kranjska Gora	14	57	73	14
5.	Partizan	14	57	88	12
6.	Vojvodina	14	57	75	10
7.	Celje	14	41	90	4
8.	Medveščak	14	33	132	1

== Final round ==
	Club	GP	GF	GA	Pts
1.	Jesenice	12	82	36	21
2.	Red Star	12	83	64	19
3.	Olimpija	12	70	65	13
4.	Kranjska Gora	12	49	119	5

=== Final ===
- Jesenice – Red Star 3–0 (9–6, 9–2, 8–5)

== Placing round ==
	Club	GP	GF	GA	Pts
5.	Vojvodina	6	33	31	11
6.	Partizan	6	35	33	9
7.	Celje	6	29	27	6
8.	Medveščak	6	21	27	6
