= 1940–41 Yugoslav Hockey League season =

- League: Yugoslav Ice Hockey League
- Sport: Ice hockey
- Champions: Ilirija
- Runners-up: Varaždin

Yugoslav Ice Hockey League seasons
- ← 1939–40 1946–47 →

The 1940–41 Yugoslav Hockey League season was the fifth season of the Yugoslav Hockey League. It was won by Ilirija.

== Structure ==
The competition was divided up into divisions. The finals consisted of teams from three entities in which hockey was played in the country, Slovenia, Croatia and Serbia. There were four Croatian teams in the league, and they played against one another in the same division. The winner would thus advance on to the championship.

== Results ==
=== Croatian division ===
Semifinals (January 12, 1941)

- Varaždin – HAŠK Zagreb 1–0,
- KSU – ZKD Zagreb 0:6 p.f.

Finals (January 13, 1941)

- Varaždin – ZKD Zagreb 3–2

=== Finals ===
The finals were held on 1 and 2 February. They were in round robin format.

- 1 February – Varaždin 7–0 Palić
- 2 February – Ilirija 10–0 Varaždin
- 2 February – Ilirija 13–1 Palić

== Final standings ==
1. Ilirija Ljubljana
2. Varaždin
3. Palić

== Champions ==
Ice Rihar, Luce Žitnik, Tone Pogačnik, Karel Pavletič, Jože Gogala, Oto Gregorič, Mirko Eržen, Viljem Morbaeher, Ernest Aljančič.
