= 1967–68 Yugoslav Ice Hockey League season =

1967–1968 season of the Yugoslav Ice Hockey League

The 1967–68 Yugoslav Ice Hockey League season was the 26th season of the Yugoslav Ice Hockey League, the top level of ice hockey in Yugoslavia. Eight teams participated in the league, and Jesenice won the championship.

== Final ranking ==
1. Jesenice
2. Medveščak
3. Kranjska Gora
4. Partizan
5. Olimpija
6. Beograd
7. Mladost
8. Red Star
