= 1966–67 Yugoslav Ice Hockey League season =

1966–1967 season of the Yugoslav Ice Hockey League

The 1966–67 Yugoslav Ice Hockey League season was the 25th season of the Yugoslav Ice Hockey League, the top level of ice hockey in Yugoslavia. Eight teams participated in the league, and Jesenice won the championship.

== Regular season ==
	Club	GP	W	T	L	Pts
1.	Jesenice	14	14	0	0	28
2.	Kranjska Gora	14	11	0	3	22
3.	Medveščak	14	10	1	3	21
4.	Olimpija	14	7	0	7	14
5.	Partizan	14	6	0	8	12
6.	Beograd	14	3	1	10	7
7.	Mladost	14	3	0	11	6
8.	Red Star	14	1	0	13	2
