= 1965–66 Yugoslav Ice Hockey League season =

1965–1966 season of the Yugoslav Ice Hockey League

The 1965–66 Yugoslav Ice Hockey League season was the 24th season of the Yugoslav Ice Hockey League, the top level of ice hockey in Yugoslavia. Eight teams participated in the league, and Jesenice won the championship.

== First round ==
=== East zone ===
	Club	GP	W	T	L	Pts
1.	Partizan	3	2	1	0	5
2.	Medveščak	3	2	1	0	5
3.	Beograd	3	1	0	2	2
4.	Red Star	3	0	0	3	0

=== West zone ===
	Club	GP	W	T	L	Pts
1.	Jesenice	3	3	0	0	6
2.	Olimpija	3	2	0	1	4
3.	Kranjska Gora	3	1	0	2	2
4.	Mladost	3	0	0	3	0

== Final round ==
	Club	GP	W	T	L	Pts
1.	Jesenice	3	3	0	0	6
2.	Medveščak	3	1	0	2	2
3.	Partizan	3	1	0	2	2
4.	Olimpija	3	1	0	2	2

== 5th–8th place ==
	Club	GP	W	T	L	Pts
5.	Beograd	3	2	1	0	5
6.	Red Star	3	2	0	1	4
7.	Kranjska Gora	3	1	1	1	3
8.	Mladost	3	0	0	3	0
