= 1962–63 Yugoslav Ice Hockey League season =

1962–1963 season of the Yugoslav Ice Hockey League

The 1962–63 Yugoslav Ice Hockey League season was the 21st season of the Yugoslav Ice Hockey League, the top level of ice hockey in Yugoslavia. Eight teams participated in the league, and Jesenice won the championship.

== Regular season ==
	Club	GP	W	T	L	Pts
1.	Jesenice	14	14	0	0	28
2.	Beograd	14	11	0	3	22
3.	Olimpija	14	10	0	4	20
4.	Red Star	14	7	1	6	15
5.	Kranjska Gora	14	6	0	8	12
6.	Partizan	14	5	0	9	10
7.	Spartak Subotica	14	2	1	11	5
8.	Medveščak	14	0	0	14	0
