= 1968–69 Yugoslav Ice Hockey League season =

1968–1969 season of the Yugoslav Ice Hockey League

The 1968–69 Yugoslav Ice Hockey League season was the 27th season of the Yugoslav Ice Hockey League, the top level of ice hockey in Yugoslavia. Eight teams participated in the league, and Jesenice won the championship.

== Regular season ==
	Club	GP	W	T	L	Pts
1.	Jesenice	14	12	1	1	25
2.	Medveščak	14	11	1	2	23
3.	Olimpija	14	11	0	3	22
4.	Partizan	14	9	0	5	18
5.	Kranjska Gora	14	4	0	10	8
6.	Slavija Vevče	14	4	0	10	8
7.	Beograd	14	3	0	11	6
8.	Mladost	14	1	0	13	2
