= 1963–64 Yugoslav Ice Hockey League season =

1963–1964 season of the Yugoslav Ice Hockey League

The 1963–64 Yugoslav Ice Hockey League season was the 22nd season of the Yugoslav Ice Hockey League, the top level of ice hockey in Yugoslavia. Eight teams participated in the league, and Jesenice won the championship.

== Regular season ==
	Club	GP	W	T	L	Pts
1.	Jesenice	14	14	0	0	28
2.	Partizan	14	9	0	5	18
3.	Medveščak	14	8	1	5	17
4.	Beograd	14	8	0	6	16
5.	Kranjska Gora	14	6	1	7	13
6.	Olimpija	14	5	1	8	11
7.	Red Star	14	4	1	9	9
8.	Spartak Subotica	14	0	0	14	0
