= 1983–84 Yugoslav Ice Hockey League season =

1983–1984 season of the Yugoslav Ice Hockey League

The 1983–84 Yugoslav Ice Hockey League season was the 42nd season of the Yugoslav Ice Hockey League, the top level of ice hockey in Yugoslavia. Eight teams participated in the league, and Olimpija won the championship.

== First round ==
	Club	GP	GF	GA	Pts
1.	Jesenice	14	181	30	26
2.	Olimpija	14	147	28	26
3.	Medveščak	14	88	56	18
4.	Red Star	14	92	72	17
5.	Kranjska Gora	14	57	79	10
6.	Celje	14	75	72	9
7.	Partizan	14	43	96	6
8.	Spartak Subotica	14	29	279	0

== Final round ==
	Club	Pts
1.	Jesenice	16
2.	Olimpija	9
3.	Red Star	5
4.	Medveščak	4

=== Final ===
- Jesenice – Olimpija 2–3 (4–6, 2–7, 2–0, 5–4, 2–3)

== Placing round ==
	Club	Pts
5.	Kranjska Gora	12
6.	Celje	11
7.	Partizan	10
8.	Spartak Subotica	1
