= Aljančić =

Aljančić is a surname. Notable people with the surname include:

- Ernest Aljančič (1916–2006), Slovenian ice hockey player and official
- Ernest Aljančič Jr. (1945–2021), Slovenian ice hockey player and ice hockey official
- Janez Aljančič (born 1982), Slovenian footballer
- Slobodan Aljančić (1922–1993), Serbian mathematician
