= 1976–77 Yugoslav Ice Hockey League season =

1976–1977 season of the Yugoslav Ice Hockey League

The 1976–77 Yugoslav Ice Hockey League season was the 35th season of the Yugoslav Ice Hockey League, the top level of ice hockey in Yugoslavia. 14 teams participated in the league, and Jesenice won the championship.

== Regular season ==
=== Group A ===
	Club	Pts
1.	Jesenice	32
2.	Olimpija	22
3.	Medveščak	16
4.	Kranjska Gora	8
5.	Partizan	2

=== Group B ===
	Club	Pts
6.	Slavija	27
7.	Tivoli	24
8.	Celje	21
9.	Triglav Kranj	8
10.	Mladost	0

=== Group C ===
	Club	Pts
11.	Red Star	20
12.	Spartak Subotica	17
13.	HC Vardar Skopje	11
14.	Vojvodina	0
