= 1973–74 Yugoslav Ice Hockey League season =

1973–1974 season of the Yugoslav Ice Hockey League

The 1973–74 Yugoslav Ice Hockey League season was the 32nd season of the Yugoslav Ice Hockey League, the top level of ice hockey in Yugoslavia. 14 teams participated in the league, and Olimpija won the championship.

== Final ranking ==
1. Olimpija
2. Jesenice
3. Medveščak
4. Slavija
5. Partizan
6. Red Star
7. Celje
8. Spartak Subotica
9. Kranjska Gora
10. Tivoli Ljubljana
11. Triglav Kranj
12. Mladost Zagreb
13. INA Sisak
14. Gorenje Velenje
