= 1979–80 Yugoslav Ice Hockey League season =

1979–1980 season of the Yugoslav Ice Hockey League

The 1979–80 Yugoslav Ice Hockey League season was the 38th season of the Yugoslav Ice Hockey League, the top level of ice hockey in Yugoslavia. Eight teams participated in the league, and Olimpija won the championship.

== Regular season ==
	Club	Pts
1.	Olimpija	36
2.	Jesenice	33
3.	Celje	20
4.	Medveščak	18
5.	Red Star	18
6.	Partizan	17
7.	Kranjska Gora	8
8.	Spartak Subotica	6
