= 1964–65 Yugoslav Ice Hockey League season =

1964–1965 season of the Yugoslav Ice Hockey League

The 1964–65 Yugoslav Ice Hockey League season was the 23rd season of the Yugoslav Ice Hockey League, the top level of ice hockey in Yugoslavia. Eight teams participated in the league, and Jesenice won the championship.

== Regular season ==
	Club	GP	W	T	L	Pts
1.	Jesenice	14	13	1	0	27
2.	Olimpija	14	9	1	4	19
3.	Kranjska Gora	14	9	0	5	18
4.	Partizan	14	8	0	6	16
5.	Medveščak Zagreb	14	7	1	6	15
6.	Red Star	14	5	0	9	10
7.	Beograd	14	3	1	10	7
8.	Mladost	14	0	0	14	0
