= 1985–86 Yugoslav Ice Hockey League season =

1985–1986 season of the Yugoslav Ice Hockey League

The 1985–86 Yugoslav Ice Hockey League season was the 44th season of the Yugoslav Ice Hockey League, the top level of ice hockey in Yugoslavia. 10 teams participated in the league, and Partizan won the championship.

== Final round ==
	Club	GP	GF	GA	Pts
1.	Partizan	12	59	45	20
2.	Jesenice	12	55	37	18
3.	Olimpija	12	31	41	12
4.	Red Star	12	32	55	8

== Play-offs ==
=== Final ===
- Partizan – Jesenice 3–1 (4–2, 6–3, 2–3, 4–3 SO)

=== 3rd place ===
- Olimpija – Red Star 2–0 (4–3, 6–3)

== Placing round ==
	Club	GP	GF	GA	Pts
5.	Kranjska Gora	12	99	40	20
6.	Medveščak	12	74	49	16
7.	Celje	12	63	50	16
8.	Bosna	12	68	43	16
9.	Vojvodina	12	67	76	12
10.	Maribor	12	17	130	1
