= 1961–62 Yugoslav Ice Hockey League season =

1961–1962 season of the Yugoslav Ice Hockey League

The 1961–62 Yugoslav Ice Hockey League season was the 20th season of the Yugoslav Ice Hockey League, the top level of ice hockey in Yugoslavia. Seven teams participated in the league, and Jesenice won the championship.

== Standings ==
=== Group A ===
	Club	GP	W	T	L	Pts
1.	Jesenice	6	6	0	0	12
2.	Ljubljana	6	3	0	3	6
3.	Partizan	6	2	0	4	4
4.	Red Star	6	1	0	5	2

=== Group B ===
	Club	GP	W	T	L	Pts
5.	Beograd	4	3	1	0	7
6.	Medveščak	4	2	1	1	5
7.	Spartak Subotica	4	0	0	4	0

== Final ranking ==
1. Jesenice
2. Ljubljana
3. Partizan
4. Red Star
5. Beograd
6. Medveščak
7. Spartak Subotica
