= 1960–61 Yugoslav Ice Hockey League season =

1960–1961 season of the Yugoslav Ice Hockey League

The 1960–61 Yugoslav Ice Hockey League season was the 19th season of the Yugoslav Ice Hockey League, the top level of ice hockey in Yugoslavia. Six teams participated in the league, and Jesenice won the championship.

== Final ranking ==
1. Jesenice
2. Partizan
3. Red Star
4. Ljubljana
5. Beograd
6. Zagreb
