= Doug Hicks =

Canadian ice hockey player (born 1955)

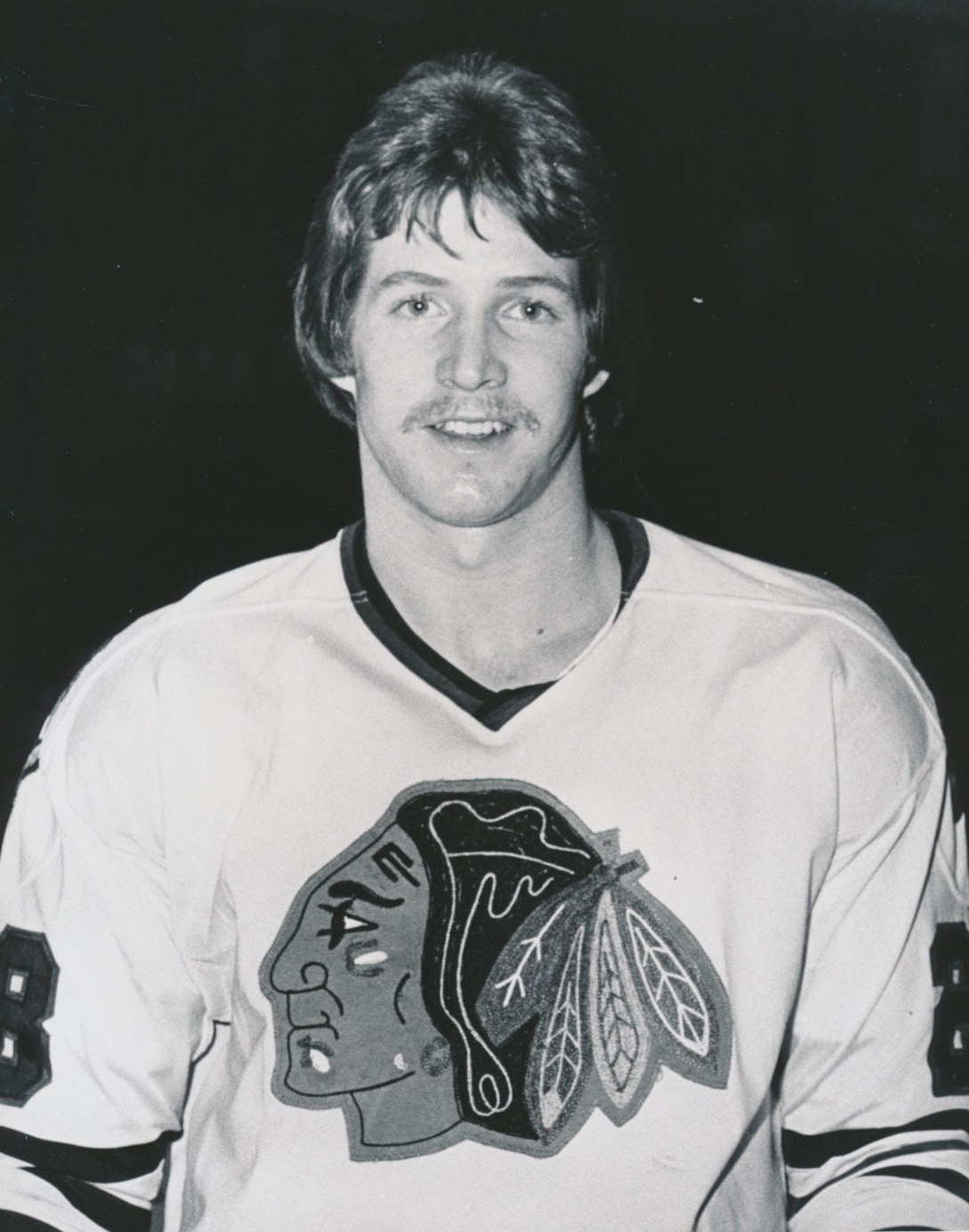
- Hicks in 1977
- Born: May 28, 1955 (age 70) Cold Lake, Alberta, Canada
- Height: 6 ft 0 in (183 cm)
- Weight: 185 lb (84 kg; 13 st 3 lb)
- Position: Defence
- Shot: Left
- Played for: Minnesota North Stars; Chicago Black Hawks; Edmonton Oilers; Washington Capitals; Kölner EC; EC Salzburg; EHC Chur; HK Jesenice
- NHL draft: 6th overall, 1974; Minnesota North Stars
- Playing career: 1974–1989

Douglas Allan Hicks (born May 28, 1955) is a Canadian former professional ice hockey defenceman. He played for the Minnesota North Stars, Chicago Black Hawks, Edmonton Oilers, and Washington Capitals of the National Hockey League between 1974 and 1983. He later played in Europe, retiring in 1989. Doug is the brother of Glenn Hicks. He has two sons named Cody and Jesse Hicks.

== Career statistics ==
=== Regular season and playoffs ===
			Regular season					Playoffs
Season	Team	League	GP	G	A	Pts	PIM	GP	G	A	Pts	PIM
1971–72	Flin Flon Bombers	WCHL	50	1	4	5	80	7	0	0	0	21
1972–73	Flin Flon Bombers	WCHL	65	14	35	49	106	9	1	2	3	15
1973–74	Flin Flon Bombers	WCHL	68	13	48	61	102	1	0	1	1	4
1974–75	Minnesota North Stars	NHL	80	6	12	18	51	—	—	—	—	—
1975–76	Minnesota North Stars	NHL	80	5	13	18	54	—	—	—	—	—
1976–77	Minnesota North Stars	NHL	79	5	14	19	68	2	0	0	0	7
1977–78	Minnesota North Stars	NHL	61	9	11	51	—	—	—	—	—
1977–78	Chicago Black Hawks	NHL	13	1	7	8	2	4	1	0	1	2
1978–79	Chicago Black Hawks	NHL	44	1	8	9	15	—	—	—	—	—
1978–79	New Brunswick Hawks	AHL	6	0	1	1	12	—	—	—	—	—
1978–79	Dallas Black Hawks	CHL	16	1	10	11	60	9	3	3	6	11
1979–80	Edmonton Oilers	NHL	78	9	31	40	52	3	0	0	0	2
1980–81	Edmonton Oilers	NHL	59	5	16	21	76	9	1	1	2	4
1981–82	Edmonton Oilers	NHL	49	3	20	23	55	—	—	—	—	—
1981–82	Washington Capitals	NHL	12	0	1	1	11	—	—	—	—	—
1982–83	Washington Capitals	NHL	6	0	0	0	7	—	—	—	—	—
1982–83	Hershey Bears	AHL	75	2	35	37	44	5	0	2	2	0
1984–85	Kölner EC	GER	36	10	26	36	44	8	0	0	0	25
1986–87	EC Salzburg	AUT	22	6	17	23	55	—	—	—	—	—
1986–87	EHC Chur	NDA	13	1	7	8	15	—	—	—	—	—
1987–88	EC Salzburg	AUT	33	4	21	25	63	—	—	—	—	—
1988–89	HK Jesenice	YUG	25	10	11	21	—	—	—	—	—	—
NHL totals			561	37	131	168	442	18	2	1	3	15

Preceded by Jerry Byers	Minnesota North Stars first-round draft pick 1974	Succeeded by Bryan Maxwell
