= 1981–82 Yugoslav Ice Hockey League season =

1981–1982 season of the Yugoslav Ice Hockey League

The 1981–82 Yugoslav Ice Hockey League season was the 40th season of the Yugoslav Ice Hockey League, the top level of ice hockey in Yugoslavia. Eight teams participated in the league, and Jesenice won the championship.

== Regular season ==
	Club	GP	W	T	L	GF	GA	Pts
1.	Jesenice	28	24	2	2	258	103	50
2.	Olimpija	28	24	2	2	315	62	50
3.	Celje	28	16	4	8	179	127	36
4.	Red Star	28	11	3	14	144	166	25
5.	Medveščak	28	10	2	16	103	158	22
6.	Partizan	28	10	1	17	123	177	21
7.	Kranjska Gora	28	8	4	16	120	200	20
8.	Spartak Subotica	28	0	0	28	85	334	0
