= 1975–76 Yugoslav Ice Hockey League season =

1975–1976 season of the Yugoslav Ice Hockey League

The 1975–76 Yugoslav Ice Hockey League season was the 34th season of the Yugoslav Ice Hockey League, the top level of ice hockey in Yugoslavia. 13 teams participated in the league, and Olimpija won the championship.

== Final ranking ==
1. Olimpija
2. Jesenice
3. Medveščak
4. Kranjska Gora
5. Partizan
6. Celje
7. Spartak Subotica
8. Red Star
9. Triglav Kranj
10. Tivoli
11. Vardar Skopje
12. Vojvodina
13. Ina Sisak
