= 1952–53 Yugoslav Ice Hockey League season =

1952–1953 season of the Yugoslav Ice Hockey League

The 1952–53 Yugoslav Ice Hockey League season was the 11th season of the Yugoslav Ice Hockey League, the top level of ice hockey in Yugoslavia. 11 teams participated in the league, and Partizan won the championship.

== Standings ==
1. Partizan
2. Zagreb
3. Mladost
4. Ljubljana
5. Jesenice
6. Spartak Subotica
7. Kladivar Celje
8. Segesta Sisak
9. Vevče
10. Partizan Brežice
11. BSK Belgrade
