= 1959–60 Yugoslav Ice Hockey League season =

1959–1960 season of the Yugoslav Ice Hockey League

The 1959–60 Yugoslav Ice Hockey League season was the 18th season of the Yugoslav Ice Hockey League, the top level of ice hockey in Yugoslavia. Six teams participated in the league, and Jesenice won the championship.

== Regular season ==
	Club	GP	W	T	L	Pts
1.	Jesenice	10	9	0	1	18
2.	Partizan	10	7	0	3	14
3.	Beograd	10	6	0	4	12
4.	Ljubljana	10	5	1	4	11
5.	Red Star	10	2	1	7	5
6.	Segesta Sisak	10	0	0	10	0
