= 1969–70 Yugoslav Ice Hockey League season =

1969–1970 season of the Yugoslav Ice Hockey League

The 1969–70 Yugoslav Ice Hockey League season was the 28th season of the Yugoslav Ice Hockey League, the top level of ice hockey in Yugoslavia. Six teams participated in the league, and Jesenice won the championship.

== Regular season ==
| | Club | GP | Pts |
|---|---|---|---|
| 1. | Jesenice | 20 | 35 |
| 2. | Olimpija | 20 | 29 |
| 3. | Medveščak | 20 | 28 |
| 4. | Kranjska Gora | 20 | 10 |
| 5. | Partizan | 20 | 10 |
| 6. | Slavija Vevče | 20 | 8 |
