= Pat Murray (ice hockey) =

Canadian ice hockey player

- Born: August 20, 1969 (age 55); Stratford, Ontario, Canada
- Height: 6 ft 2 in (188 cm)
- Weight: 185 lb (84 kg; 13 st 3 lb)
- Position: Left wing
- Shot: Left
- Played for: Philadelphia Flyers; HDD Olimpija Ljubljana
- National team: Canada
- NHL draft: 35th overall, 1988; Philadelphia Flyers
- Playing career: 1990–1998

Patrick E. Murray (born August 20, 1969) is a Canadian former professional ice hockey left wing. He played 25 games in the National Hockey League with the Philadelphia Flyers during the 1990–91 and 1991–92 seasons. The rest of his career, which lasted from 1990 to 1998, was spent in the minor leagues and then in Europe.

== Playing career ==
Born in Stratford, Ontario, Murray was drafted 35th overall by the Philadelphia Flyers in the 1988 NHL Entry Draft from Michigan State Spartans. He spent much of his tenure with the Flyers' American Hockey League affiliate the Hershey Bears, but did play 25 game in the NHL over two seasons. He also played in the International Hockey League for the Phoenix Roadrunners and the Kalamazoo Wings. A brief spell in the ECHL with the Knoxville Cherokees was followed with a second time with the Kalamazoo Wings and then three seasons in Germany before he retired in 1998.

== Career statistics ==
=== Regular season and playoffs ===
| | | | Regular season | | | | | Playoffs |
| Season | Team | League | GP | G | A | Pts | PIM | GP | G | A | Pts | PIM |
|---|---|---|---|---|---|---|---|---|---|---|---|---|
| 1984–85 | Seaforth Centenaires | OHA-D | 31 | 29 | 19 | 48 | 16 | — | — | — | — | — |
| 1985–86 | Stratford Cullitons | MWJHL | 36 | 13 | 27 | 40 | 10 | — | — | — | — | — |
| 1986–87 | Stratford Cullitons | MWJHL | 42 | 34 | 75 | 109 | 38 | — | — | — | — | — |
| 1987–88 | Michigan State University | CCHA | 42 | 14 | 23 | 37 | 26 | — | — | — | — | — |
| 1988–89 | Michigan State University | CCHA | 46 | 21 | 41 | 62 | 65 | — | — | — | — | — |
| 1989–90 | Michigan State University | CCHA | 45 | 24 | 60 | 84 | 36 | — | — | — | — | — |
| 1990–91 | Philadelphia Flyers | NHL | 16 | 2 | 1 | 3 | 15 | — | — | — | — | — |
| 1990–91 | Hershey Bears | AHL | 57 | 15 | 38 | 53 | 8 | 7 | 5 | 2 | 7 | 0 |
| 1991–92 | Philadelphia Flyers | NHL | 9 | 1 | 0 | 1 | 0 | — | — | — | — | — |
| 1991–92 | Hershey Bears | AHL | 69 | 19 | 43 | 62 | 25 | 6 | 1 | 2 | 3 | 0 |
| 1992–93 | Hershey Bears | AHL | 69 | 21 | 32 | 53 | 63 | — | — | — | — | — |
| 1993–94 | Kalamazoo Wings | IHL | 17 | 2 | 3 | 5 | 6 | — | — | — | — | — |
| 1993–94 | Phoenix Roadrunners | IHL | 25 | 6 | 8 | 14 | 44 | — | — | — | — | — |
| 1994–95 | Knoxville Cherokees | ECHL | 11 | 7 | 9 | 16 | 4 | — | — | — | — | — |
| 1994–95 | Kalamazoo Wings | IHL | 33 | 11 | 10 | 21 | 16 | 6 | 3 | 0 | 3 | 2 |
| 1994–95 | Canadian National Team | Intl | 3 | 3 | 0 | 3 | 0 | — | — | — | — | — |
| 1995–96 | ESC Moskitos Essen | GER-2 | 39 | 24 | 60 | 84 | 130 | — | — | — | — | — |
| 1996–97 | ESC Moskitos Essen | GER-2 | 43 | 23 | 37 | 60 | 72 | — | — | — | — | — |
| 1997–98 | ERC Sonthofen | GER-2 | 28 | 17 | 20 | 37 | 28 | — | — | — | — | — |
| 1997–98 | HDD Olimpija Ljubljana | SLO | 16 | 9 | 5 | 14 | — | — | — | — | — | — |
| AHL totals | | | 195 | 55 | 113 | 168 | 96 | 13 | 6 | 4 | 10 | 0 |
| NHL totals | | | 25 | 3 | 1 | 4 | 15 | — | — | — | — | — |

== Awards and honours ==
| Award | Year |
|---|---|
| All-CCHA Second Team | 1989–90 |
