= 1955–56 Yugoslav Ice Hockey League season =

1955–1956 season of the Yugoslav Ice Hockey League

The 1955–56 Yugoslav Ice Hockey League season was the 14th season of the Yugoslav Ice Hockey League, the top level of ice hockey in Yugoslavia. Six teams participated in the league, and Zagreb won the championship.

== Standings ==
1. Zagreb
2. Jesenice
3. Ljubljana
4. Partizan
5. Red Star
6. Mladost
