= 1978–79 Yugoslav Ice Hockey League season =

1978–1979 season of the Yugoslav Ice Hockey League

The 1978–79 Yugoslav Ice Hockey League season was the 37th season of the Yugoslav Ice Hockey League, the top level of ice hockey in Yugoslavia. Six teams participated in the league, and Olimpija won the championship.

== Regular season ==
	Club	Pts
1.	Olimpija	37
2.	Jesenice	31
3.	Celje	27
4.	Medveščak	16
5.	Kranjska Gora	12
6.	Red Star	0

== Final ==
- Olimpija – Jesenice 5–3/11–7
