= 1991–92 Slovenian Hockey League season =

1991–92 Slovenian Hockey League Season
- League: Slovenian Ice Hockey League
- Sport: Ice hockey
- Regular-season winner: Jesenice
- Champions: Jesenice
- Runners-up: Olimpija

Slovenian Ice Hockey League seasons
- ← None 1992–93 →

The 1991–92 Slovenian Hockey League season was the first season of the Slovenian Hockey League. Prior to this, Slovenia was part of SFR Yugoslavia and Slovenian teams participated in the Yugoslav Ice Hockey League.

At the end of the regular season the playoffs were held. Jesenice went on to win the first Slovenian Hockey Championship.

== Teams ==
Team	City	Arena	1990–91 result
Olimpija	Ljubljana	Tivoli Hall	Yugoslav First League, 2nd
Jesenice	Jesenice	Podmežakla Hall	Yugoslav First League, 4th
Bled	Bled	Bled Ice Hall	Yugoslav First League, 6th
Slavija	Ljubljana	Zalog Ice Rink	Yugoslav First League, 10th
Cinkarna	Celje	Mestni Park	Yugoslav Second League, 1st
Jesenice II	Jesenice	Podmežakla Hall	Yugoslav Second League, 2nd
Olimpija II	Ljubljana	Tivoli Hall	Yugoslav Second League, 3rd
Triglav	Kranj	Gorenjski Sejem	Yugoslav Second League, 5th

== Standings after the regular season ==
Rk	Team	GP	W	T	L	GF	GA	Pts
1.	Jesenice	14	12	1	1	161	31	25
2.	Olimpija	14	12	1	1	202	24	25
3.	Bled	14	9	0	5	156	38	18
4.	Jesenice II	14	7	0	7	88	71	14
5.	Celje	14	7	0	7	71	81	14
6.	Triglav Kranj	14	6	0	8	70	144	12
7.	Olimpija II	14	2	0	12	45	127	4
8.	Slavija	14	0	0	14	9	306	0

== Play-offs ==
=== First Part ===
Rk	Team	GP	W	L	GF	GA	Pts
1.	Olimpija	6	5	1	40	15	13
2.	Jesenice	6	4	2	41	16	12
3.	Bled	6	2	4	22	30	6
4.	Jesenice II	6	1	5	16	58	3

=== Final ===
Jesenice defeated Olimpija 4–3 in a best of seven series.

- Olimpija – Jesenice 4–3
- Jesenice – Olimpija 4–3
- Olimpija – Jesenice 2–3
- Jesenice – Olimpija 6–3
- Olimpija – Jesenice 3–0
- Jesenice – Olimpija 2–5
- Olimpija – Jesenice 3–6

=== Third place ===
Bled defeated Jesenice II 3–0 in a best of five series.

- Bled – Jesenice II 9–3
- Jesenice II – Bled 1–10
- Bled – Jesenice II 7–1
