= 1956–57 Yugoslav Ice Hockey League season =

1956–1957 season of the Yugoslav Ice Hockey League

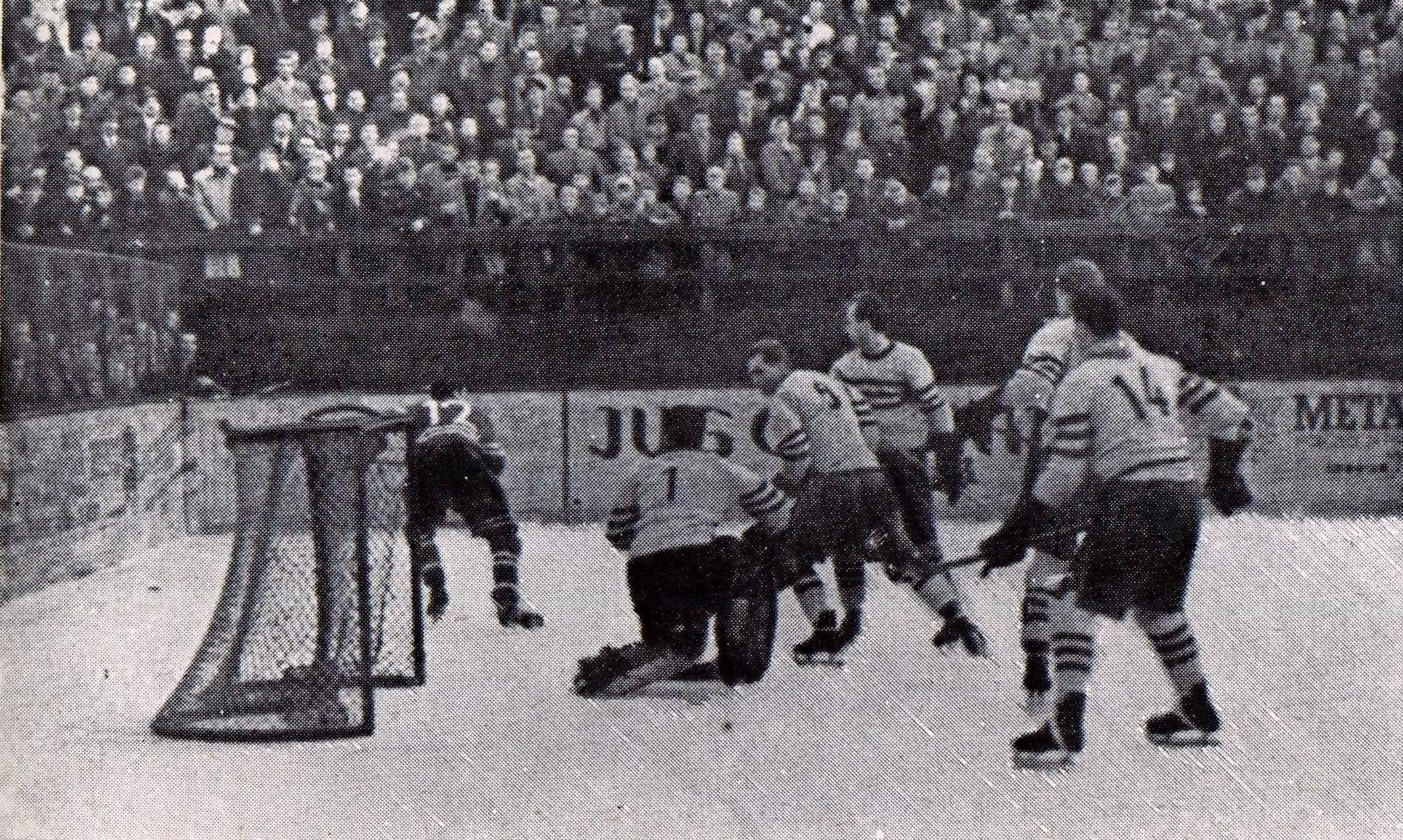

The 1956–57 Yugoslav Ice Hockey League season was the 15th season of the Yugoslav Ice Hockey League, the top level of ice hockey in Yugoslavia. Five teams participated in the league, and Jesenice won the championship.

== Regular season ==
| | Club | GP | W | T | L | Pts |
|---|---|---|---|---|---|---|
| 1. | Jesenice | 4 | 3 | 1 | 0 | 7 |
| 2. | Partizan | 4 | 3 | 0 | 1 | 6 |
| 3. | Ljubljana | 4 | 2 | 1 | 1 | 5 |
| 4. | Red Star | 4 | 1 | 0 | 3 | 2 |
| 5. | Drvodjelac Varaždin | 4 | 0 | 0 | 4 | 0 |
