= 1971–72 Yugoslav Ice Hockey League season =

1971–1972 season of the Yugoslav Ice Hockey League

The 1971–72 Yugoslav Ice Hockey League season was the 30th season of the Yugoslav Ice Hockey League, the top level of ice hockey in Yugoslavia. Six teams participated in the league, and Olimpija won the championship.

== Final ranking ==
1. Olimpija
2. Jesenice
3. Medveščak
4. Kranjska Gora
5. Slavija Vevče
6. Partizan
