= 1982–83 Yugoslav Ice Hockey League season =

1982–1983 season of the Yugoslav Ice Hockey League

The 1982–83 Yugoslav Ice Hockey League season was the 41st season of the Yugoslav Ice Hockey League, the top level of ice hockey in Yugoslavia. Seven teams participated in the league, and Olimpija won the championship.

== First round ==
	Club	GP	GF	GA	Pts
1.	Olimpija	12	99	17	20
2.	Jesenice	12	143	34	20
3.	Medveščak	12	59	32	15
4.	Celje	12	52	34	14
5.	Red Star	12	59	60	11
6.	Partizan	12	32	115	4
7.	Vojvodina Novi Sad	12	18	170	0

== Final round ==
	Club	GP	GF	GA	Pts (Bonus)
1.	Olimpija	6	47	15	14(4)
2.	Jesenice	6	38	15	13(3)
3.	Medveščak	6	13	48	4(2)
4.	Celje	6	15	35	1(1)

=== Final ===
- Olimpija – Jesenice 2–1 (4–5, 8–5, 9–3)

== Placing round ==
	Club	GP	GF	GA	Pts (Bonus)
5.	Red Star	4	39	12	9(3)
6.	Partizan	4	24	27	6(2)
7.	Vojvodina Novi Sad	4	13	37	3(1)
