= 1958–59 Yugoslav Ice Hockey League season =

1958–1959 season of the Yugoslav Ice Hockey League

The 1958–59 Yugoslav Ice Hockey League season was the 17th season of the Yugoslav Ice Hockey League, the top level of ice hockey in Yugoslavia. Six teams participated in the league, and Jesenice won the championship.

== Regular season ==
	Club	GP	W	T	L	Pts
1.	Jesenice	10	10	0	0	20
2.	Ljubljana	10	6	1	3	13
3.	Partizan	10	5	0	5	10
4.	Red Star	10	3	1	6	7
5.	Tasmajdan Belgrade	10	3	0	7	6
6.	Zagreb	10	2	0	8	4
