= 1999–2000 Slovenian Hockey League season =

Slovenian ice hockey league season

The 1999–2000 Slovenian Ice Hockey League season was the ninth season of the Slovenian Ice Hockey League. Olimpija won the league championships.

== First round ==
Place	Team	Pts	GP	W	T	L	GF–GA	Diff
1	Olimpija	26	14	13	0	1	115–33	+82
2	Jesenice	24	14	12	0	2	99–26	+73
3	Slavija	20	14	10	0	4	89–35	+54
4	Bled	16	13	8	0	5	77–72	+5
5	MARC Interieri	11	14	5	1	8	49–64	–15
6	Kranjska Gora	8	13	4	0	9	36–68	–32
7	Celje	3	14	1	1	12	31–112	–81
8	Triglav Kranj	2	14	1	0	13	33–111	–78

== Final round ==
=== Group A ===
Place	Team	Pts	GP	W	T	L	GF–GA	Diff
1	Olimpija	23 (4)	12	9	1	2	57–29	+28
2	Jesenice	20 (3)	12	7	3	2	53–30	+23
3	Slavija	10 (2)	12	3	2	7	32–51	–19
4	Bled	5 (1)	12	1	2	9	32–64	–32

=== Group B ===
Place	Team	Pts	Team	W	T	L	GF–GA	Diff
5	Kranjska Gora	10 (3)	6				31–28	+3
6	Triglav Kranj	10 (1)	6				41–19	+22
7	Interieri	10 (4)	6				26–23	+3
8	Celje	4 (2)	6				12–40	–28

== Play-offs ==
=== Final ===
- 21 March 2000: Olimpija – Jesenice: 5–1 (2–0, 3–0, 0–1)
- 23 March 2000: Jesenice – Olimpija : 1–2 OT (1–1, 0–0, 0–0, 0–1)
- 25 March 2000: Olimpija – Jesenice: 4–1 (1–1, 1–0, 2–0)
- 28 March 2000: Jesenice – Olimpija : 1–2 (0–0, 1–0, 0–2)

=== 3rd place ===
- Slavija – Bled: 3–2
- Bled – Slavija : 4–0
- Slavija – Bled: 5–1
- Bled – Slavija : 2–3

=== 5th place ===
- Kranjska Gora – Triglav Kranj: 4–2
- Triglav Kranj – Kranjska Gora: 3–4
