= 1974–75 Yugoslav Ice Hockey League season =

1974–1975 season of the Yugoslav Ice Hockey League

The 1974–75 Yugoslav Ice Hockey League season was the 33rd season of the Yugoslav Ice Hockey League, the top level of ice hockey in Yugoslavia. 14 teams participated in the league, and Olimpija won the championship.

== Regular season ==
=== Group A1 ===
| | Club | Pts |
|---|---|---|
| 1. | Olimpija | 26 |
| 2. | Jesenice | 24 |
| 3. | Medveščak | 6 |

=== Group A2 ===
| | Club | Pts |
|---|---|---|
| 4. | Slavija Vevče | 7 |
| 5. | Partizan | 5 |
| 6. | Kranjska Gora | 0 |

=== Group B ===
| | Club | Pts |
|---|---|---|
| 7. | Red Star | 9 |
| 8. | Triglav Kranj | 7 |
| 9. | Tivoli | 5 |
| 10. | Spartak Subotica | 3 |

=== Group C ===
| | Club | GP | W | T | L | GF | GA | Pts |
|---|---|---|---|---|---|---|---|---|
| 11. | Vardar Skopje | 3 | 2 | 0 | 1 | 18 | 8 | 4 |
| 12. | Mladost | 3 | 2 | 0 | 1 | 12 | 8 | 4 |
| 13. | Ina Sisak | 3 | 1 | 0 | 2 | 9 | 19 | 2 |
| 14. | Vojvodina | 3 | 1 | 0 | 2 | 5 | 13 | 2 |
