= 1970–71 Yugoslav Ice Hockey League season =

1970–1971 season of the Yugoslav Ice Hockey League

The 1970–71 Yugoslav Ice Hockey League season was the 29th season of the Yugoslav Ice Hockey League, the top level of ice hockey in Yugoslavia. 11 teams participated in the league, and Jesenice won the championship.

== First round ==
	Club	GP	W	T	L	GF	GA	Pts
1.	Jesenice	10	10	0	0	106	19	20
2.	Olimpija	10	7	0	3	91	27	14
3.	Medveščak	10	4	0	6	78	47	8
4.	Slavija Vevče	10	4	0	6	28	69	8
5.	Kranjska Gora	10	2	1	6	31	76	5
6.	Beograd	10	1	1	8	30	106	3

== Final round ==
=== Group A ===
	Club	Pts
1.	Jesenice	24
2.	Olimpija	14
3.	Medveščak	7
4.	Slavija Vevče	3

=== Group B ===
	Club	Pts
5.	Partizan	9
6.	Kranjska Gora	9
7.	Beograd	6

=== Group C ===
	Club	Pts
8.	Red Star	16
9.	Spartak Subotica	15
10.	Mladost	14
11.	Vardar Skopje	1
