= Drago Mlinarec (ice hockey) =

- Born: August 24, 1960 (age 64); Čakovec, Yugoslavia
- Height: 6 ft 2 in (188 cm)
- Weight: 190 lb (86 kg; 13 st 8 lb)
- Position: Defence
- Played for: HK Acroni Jesenice; HK Kranjska Gora; KHL Medvescak
- National team: Yugoslavia and Slovenia
- Playing career: 1977–1996

Dragutin Mlinarec (born August 24, 1960 in Čakovec, Yugoslavia) is a retired Slovenian professional ice hockey player.

== Career ==
=== Club career ===
In 1977, Mlinarec made his professional debut with HK Kranjska Gora in the Yugoslav Ice Hockey League. He joined HK Acroni Jesenice the following year. Mlinarec played 18 seasons with Jesenice, and one season in 1988-89 with KHL Medvescak. He won 8 Yugoslav Ice Hockey League titles with Jesenice, and one with Medvescak.

=== International career ===
Mlinarec played for both the Yugoslavia national ice hockey team and the Slovenia national ice hockey team during his international career. He participated in 8 World Championships, and the Olympic Games in 1984.
