= 1957–58 Yugoslav Ice Hockey League season =

1957–1958 season of the Yugoslav Ice Hockey League

The 1957–58 Yugoslav Ice Hockey League season was the 16th season of the Yugoslav Ice Hockey League, the top level of ice hockey in Yugoslavia. Five teams participated in the league, and Jesenice won the championship.

== Regular season ==
	Club	GP	W	T	L	Pts
1.	Jesenice	8	8	0	0	16
2.	Ljubljana	8	5	0	3	10
3.	Partizan	8	4	0	4	8
4.	Red Star	8	2	0	6	4
5.	Zagreb	8	1	0	7	2
