= 1948–49 Yugoslav Ice Hockey League season =

1948–1949 season of the Yugoslav Ice Hockey League

The 1948–49 Yugoslav Ice Hockey League season was the eighth season of the Yugoslav Ice Hockey League, the top level of ice hockey in Yugoslavia. Nine teams participated in the league, and Mladost won the championship.

== Regular season ==
=== Group A ===
	Club	GP	W	T	L	GF	GA	Pts
1.	Mladost	2	1	0	1	9	7	2
2.	Partizan	2	1	0	1	6	5	2
3.	Ljubljana	2	1	0	1	3	6	2

=== Group B ===
	Club	GP	W	T	L	GF	GA	Pts
4.	Tekstilac Varaždin	2	2	0	0	13	1	4
5.	Sparta Subotica	2	1	0	1	5	8	2
6.	Zagreb	2	0	0	2	4	13	0

=== Group C ===
	Club	GP	W	T	L	GF	GA	Pts
7.	Naprijed Sisak	2	2	0	0	22	3	4
8.	Belgrade	2	1	0	1	8	4	2
9.	Korana Karlovac	2	0	0	2	5	28	0
