= 1980–81 Yugoslav Ice Hockey League season =

1980–1981 season of the Yugoslav Ice Hockey League

The 1980–81 Yugoslav Ice Hockey League season was the 39th season of the Yugoslav Ice Hockey League, the top level of ice hockey in Yugoslavia. Eight teams participated in the league, and Jesenice won the championship.

== Regular season ==
	Club	GP	W	T	L	GF	GA	Pts
1.	Jesenice	28	27	1	0	307	84	55
2.	Olimpija	28	21	1	6	306	76	43
3.	Celje	28	15	2	11	170	124	32
4.	Partizan	28	12	2	14	142	151	26
5.	Red Star	28	11	2	15	148	175	24
6.	Medveščak	28	11	1	16	125	162	23
7.	Tivoli	28	9	3	16	132	150	21
8.	Vojvodina	28	0	0	28	59	469	0
