= 1987–88 Yugoslav Ice Hockey League season =

1987–1988 season of the Yugoslav Ice Hockey League

The 1987–88 Yugoslav Ice Hockey League season was the 46th season of the Yugoslav Ice Hockey League, the top level of ice hockey in Yugoslavia. 10 teams participated in the league, and Jesenice won the championship.

== Final ranking ==
1. Jesenice
2. Olimpija
3. Partizan
4. Medveščak
5. Vojvodina Novi Sad
6. Red Star
7. Celje
8. Kranjska Gora
9. Bosna
10. HK Skopje
