= 1986–87 Yugoslav Ice Hockey League season =

1986–1987 season of the Yugoslav Ice Hockey League

The 1986–87 Yugoslav Ice Hockey League season was the 45th season of the Yugoslav Ice Hockey League, the top level of ice hockey in Yugoslavia. Nine teams participated in the league, and Jesenice won the championship.

== Final ranking ==
1. Jesenice
2. Partizan
3. Olimpija
4. Red Star
5. Bosna
6. Kranjska Gora
7. Medveščak
8. Skopje
9. Vojvodina
