= Yugoslav Ice Hockey League =

Yugoslavian men's ice hokey top division

- Most recent season or competition: 1990–91 Yugoslav Ice Hockey League season
- Sport: Ice hockey
- Founded: 1936
- Folded: 1991
- Replaced by: Bosnia and Herzegovina League; Croatian League; Serbian League; Slovenian League
- Most titles: Jesenice (23 titles)
- Domestic cup: Yugoslav Cup

The Yugoslav Ice Hockey League was the top ice hockey league in the old Yugoslavia.

In 1939, Yugoslavia became a member of the International Ice Hockey Federation. That year also, the country held its first national championship, with Ilirija emerging as champion. For many years, teams from Slovenia dominated even if Serbian and Croatian teams were also successful for a while during the late-1980s and early-1990s, right before the breakup of Yugoslavia.

The league folded in 1991, when the country split. Since then, Serbia, Croatia, Slovenia and Bosnia and Herzegovina have had their own national leagues.

== Yugoslav League champions ==
- 1936–37 : (Kingdom of Yugoslavia) Ilirija*
- 1937–38 : (Kingdom of Yugoslavia) Ilirija*
- 1938–39 : (Kingdom of Yugoslavia) Ilirija
- 1939–40 : (Kingdom of Yugoslavia) Ilirija
- 1940–41 : (Kingdom of Yugoslavia) Ilirija
- 1941–46 : Not played
- 1946–47 : (Socialist Republic of Croatia) Mladost
- 1947–48 : (Socialist Republic of Serbia) Partizan
- 1948–49 : (Socialist Republic of Croatia) Mladost
- 1949–50 : Not played
- 1950–51 : (Socialist Republic of Serbia) Partizan
- 1951–52 : (Socialist Republic of Serbia) Partizan
- 1952–53 : (Socialist Republic of Serbia) Partizan
- 1953–54 : (Socialist Republic of Serbia) Partizan
- 1954–55 : (Socialist Republic of Serbia) Partizan
- 1955–56 : (Socialist Republic of Croatia) SD Zagreb
- 1956–57 : (Socialist Republic of Slovenia) Jesenice
- 1957–58 : (Socialist Republic of Slovenia) Jesenice
- 1958–59 : (Socialist Republic of Slovenia) Jesenice
- 1959–60 : (Socialist Republic of Slovenia) Jesenice
- 1960–61 : (Socialist Republic of Slovenia) Jesenice
- 1961–62 : (Socialist Republic of Slovenia) Jesenice
- 1962–63 : (Socialist Republic of Slovenia) Jesenice
- 1963–64 : (Socialist Republic of Slovenia) Jesenice
- 1964–65 : (Socialist Republic of Slovenia) Jesenice
- 1965–66 : (Socialist Republic of Slovenia) Jesenice
- 1966–67 : (Socialist Republic of Slovenia) Jesenice
- 1967–68 : (Socialist Republic of Slovenia) Jesenice
- 1968–69 : (Socialist Republic of Slovenia) Jesenice
- 1969–70 : (Socialist Republic of Slovenia) Jesenice
- 1970–71 : (Socialist Republic of Slovenia) Jesenice
- 1971–72 : (Socialist Republic of Slovenia) Olimpija
- 1972–73 : (Socialist Republic of Slovenia) Jesenice
- 1973–74 : (Socialist Republic of Slovenia) Olimpija
- 1974–75 : (Socialist Republic of Slovenia) Olimpija
- 1975–76 : (Socialist Republic of Slovenia) Olimpija
- 1976–77 : (Socialist Republic of Slovenia) Jesenice
- 1977–78 : (Socialist Republic of Slovenia) Jesenice
- 1978–79 : (Socialist Republic of Slovenia) Olimpija
- 1979–80 : (Socialist Republic of Slovenia) Olimpija
- 1980–81 : (Socialist Republic of Slovenia) Jesenice
- 1981–82 : (Socialist Republic of Slovenia) Jesenice
- 1982–83 : (Socialist Republic of Slovenia) Olimpija
- 1983–84 : (Socialist Republic of Slovenia) Olimpija
- 1984–85 : (Socialist Republic of Slovenia) Jesenice
- 1985–86 : (Socialist Republic of Serbia) Partizan
- 1986–87 : (Socialist Republic of Slovenia) Jesenice
- 1987–88 : (Socialist Republic of Slovenia) Jesenice
- 1988–89 : (Socialist Republic of Croatia) Medveščak
- 1989–90 : (Socialist Republic of Croatia) Medveščak
- 1990–91 : (Socialist Republic of Croatia) Medveščak

* – by default as the only club in the competition.

Club	Winners	Winning years
Jesenice	23	1957, 1958, 1959, 1960, 1961, 1962, 1963, 1964, 1965, 1966, 1967, 1968, 1969, 1970, 1971, 1973, 1977, 1978, 1981, 1982, 1985, 1987, 1988
Ilirija / Olimpija	13	1937, 1938, 1939, 1940, 1941, 1972, 1974, 1975, 1976, 1979, 1980, 1983, 1984
Partizan	7	1948, 1951, 1952, 1953, 1954, 1955, 1986
Medveščak	3	1989, 1990, 1991
Mladost	2	1947, 1949
SD Zagreb	1	1956

== Yugoslav Cup winners ==
- 1966 : (Socialist Republic of Serbia) Partizan
- 1967 : (Socialist Republic of Slovenia) Jesenice
- 1968 : (Socialist Republic of Slovenia) Jesenice
- 1969 : (Socialist Republic of Slovenia) Olimpija
- 1970 : (Socialist Republic of Slovenia) Jesenice
- 1971 : (Socialist Republic of Slovenia) Jesenice
- 1972 : (Socialist Republic of Slovenia) Olimpija
- 1973 : (Socialist Republic of Slovenia) Jesenice
- 1974 : (Socialist Republic of Slovenia) Jesenice
- 1975 : (Socialist Republic of Slovenia) Olimpija
- 1976 : (Socialist Republic of Slovenia) Jesenice
- 1977 : (Socialist Republic of Slovenia) Jesenice
- 1978 – 1985 : Not played
- 1986 : (Socialist Republic of Serbia) Partizan
- 1987 : (Socialist Republic of Slovenia) Olimpija
- 1988 : (Socialist Republic of Croatia) Medveščak
- 1989 : (Socialist Republic of Croatia) Medveščak
- 1990 : (Socialist Republic of Croatia) Medveščak
- 1991 : (Socialist Republic of Croatia) Medveščak

Club	Titles	Years won
Jesenice	8	1967, 1968, 1970, 1971, 1973, 1974, 1976, 1977
Olimpija	4	1969, 1972, 1975, 1987
Medveščak	4	1988, 1989, 1990, 1991
Partizan	2	1966, 1986

== Teams ==
Below is a list of teams that had participated. A number of these participated for only a few seasons, while others participated for many.

- (Socialist Republic of Slovenia) Jesenice
- (Socialist Republic of Slovenia) Olimpija
- (Socialist Republic of Slovenia) Bled
- (Socialist Republic of Slovenia) Slavija
- (Socialist Republic of Slovenia) Kranjska Gora
- (Socialist Republic of Slovenia) Celje
- (Socialist Republic of Slovenia) Maribor
- (Socialist Republic of Slovenia) Tivoli
- (Socialist Republic of Slovenia) Gorenje Velenje
- (Socialist Republic of Slovenia) Prevalje
- (Socialist Republic of Serbia) Partizan
- (Socialist Republic of Serbia) Red Star
- (Socialist Republic of Serbia) Beograd
- (Socialist Republic of Serbia) Tašmajdan
- (Socialist Republic of Serbia) Vojvodina
- (Socialist Republic of Serbia) Spartak Subotica
- (Socialist Republic of Croatia) Medveščak
- (Socialist Republic of Croatia) SD Zagreb
- (Socialist Republic of Croatia) Mladost
- (Socialist Republic of Croatia) Sisak
- (Socialist Republic of Croatia) Varaždin
- (Socialist Republic of Croatia) Karlovac
- (Socialist Republic of Bosnia and Herzegovina) Bosna
- (Socialist Republic of Macedonia) Makoteks Skopje
- (Socialist Republic of Macedonia) Vardar Skopje

== See also ==
- Slohokej League
- Slovenian Ice Hockey League
- Serbian Hockey League
- Croatian Ice Hockey League
- Bosnia and Herzegovina Hockey League
- Panonian League
