= 1989–90 Yugoslav Ice Hockey League season =

1989–1990 season of the Yugoslav Ice Hockey League

The 1989–90 Yugoslav Ice Hockey League season was the 48th season of the Yugoslav Ice Hockey League, the top level of ice hockey in Yugoslavia. Six teams participated in the league, and Medveščak won the championship.

== Final ranking ==
1. Medveščak
2. Jesenice
3. Olimpija
4. Partizan
5. Red Star
6. Vojvodina Novi Sad
