= 1990–91 Yugoslav Ice Hockey League season =

1990–1991 season of the Yugoslav Ice Hockey League

The 1990–91 Yugoslav Ice Hockey League season was the 49th and final season of the Yugoslav Ice Hockey League, the top level of ice hockey in Yugoslavia. 10 teams participated in the league, and Medveščak won the championship. For the 1991–92 season, Croatia, Serbia, and Slovenia set up their own national leagues.

== Final ranking ==
1. Medveščak
2. Olimpija
3. Red Star
4. Jesenice
5. Vojvodina Novi Sad
6. Bled
7. Spartak Subotica
8. Partizan
9. Mladost
10. Slavija
