= Damjan Dervarič =

Slovenian ice hockey player (born 1982)

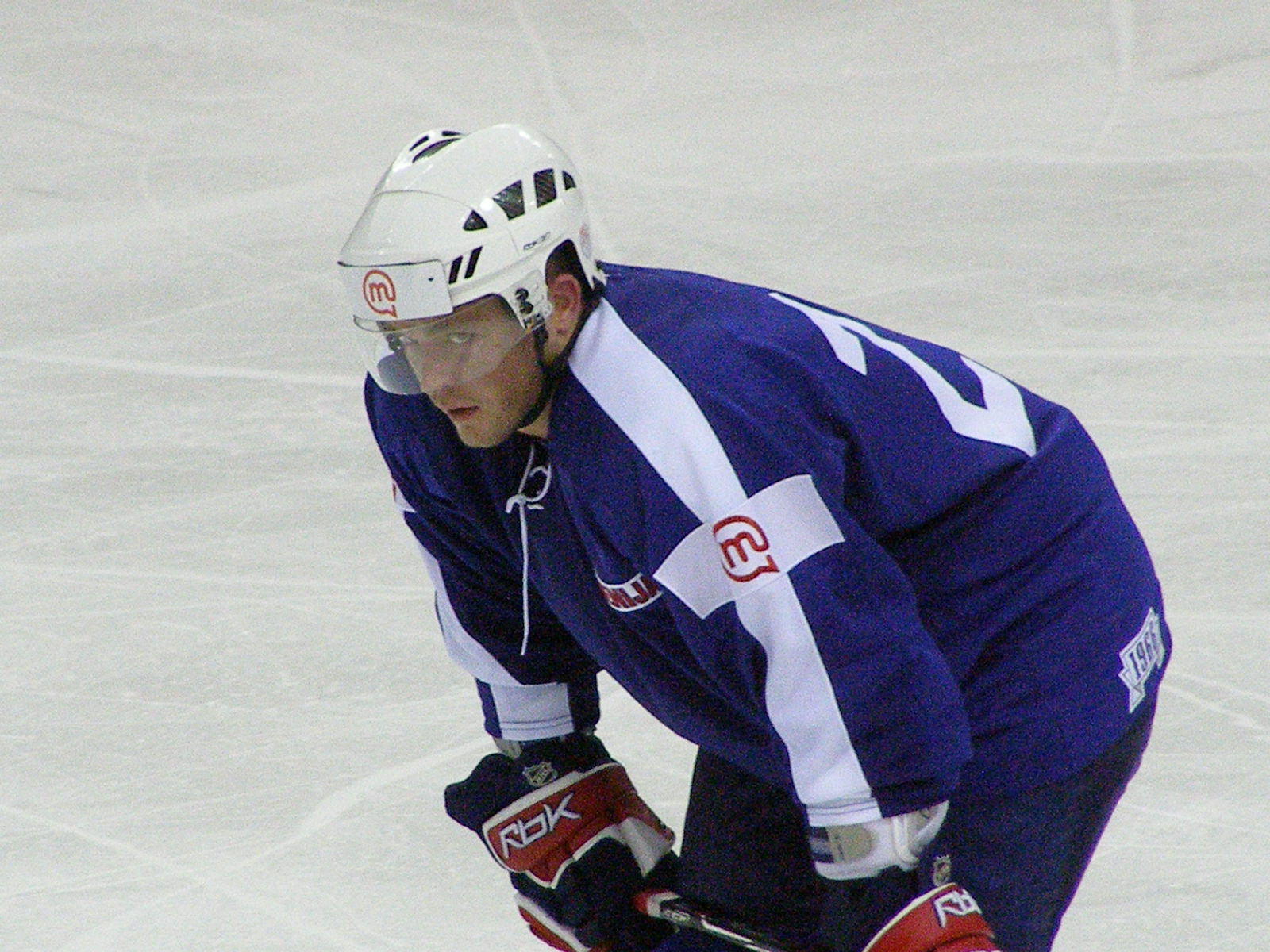
- Born: February 6, 1982 (age 43); Ljubljana, SFR Yugoslavia
- Height: 5 ft 11 in (180 cm)
- Weight: 192 lb (87 kg; 13 st 10 lb)
- Position: Defence
- Shoots: Left
- Slovak team Former teams: HKM Zvolen; HDD Olimpija Ljubljana; HC Havirov Panthers; HK Jesenice
- National team: Slovenia
- Playing career: 2003–present

Damjan Dervarič (born February 6, 1982) is a Slovenian professional ice hockey player who is currently on a try-out contract with HKM Zvolen of the Slovak Extraliga. He participated at the 2011 IIHF World Championship as a member of the Slovenia men's national ice hockey team.

Dervarič previously played for Acroni Jesenice and Havířov Panthers.
