= KHL Karlovac =

- City: Karlovac, Croatia
- League: Croatian Inline Hockey League
- Founded: 1930
- Colours
- Website: www.khl-karlovac.webs.com

Franchise history
- Klub Hokeja na Ledu Karlovac

KHL Karlovac is a Croatian ice hockey team that is located in Karlovac. Its nickname is "Žapci".

== History ==
It was formed in 1930, as HK Karlovac, being one of the oldest hockey clubs in Croatia. The strongest the club got was while it played in the Yugoslavian Hockey League. However, it remained in the top division for only a couple seasons. The club since then has had difficulties as teams in Zagreb and Belgrade took their best players. The lack of an indoor arena and short winters resulted in the club folding in the 1970s. However, in 2003 or 2004 the club was reformed. The club has been playing in a Slovenian minor league since 2008. It also participates in the Croatian Inline Hockey League since its founding in 2008, under the name IHK Karlovac. The Club's main goal is to have an indoor ice arena constructed, which would significantly improve the club's position.

== Records in Yugoslav league ==
- 1947/48 Yugoslav 1st league - HK Udarnik Karlovac - 6th place out of 6
- 1948/49 Yugoslav 1st league - HK Korana Karlovac - 9th place out of 9

After 1949 HK Partizan obtained the best players of the club and it fell down to the weaker 2nd league.

== Roster ==
Roster can be seen here .

=== Goalies ===
- Marko PLETIKOSIĆ no.22
- Nina RAPO no.1

=== Skaters ===
- Domen ISTINIĆ no.11
- Ozren ŠEGAVIĆ no.12
- Matija RATKAJ no.10
- Dejan KOSTAJNŠEK no.3
- Boris SIMIĆ no.32
- Aleš CRNKO no.41
- Gary TONGUE no.33
- Igor PAVLAKOVIĆ no.24
- Andrej PREVOLNIK
- Bruno BRCKAN no.7
- Marko EKART no.
- Renato BUKOVAC no.4
- Nik VRNOGA no.8
- Vanja GVOZDIĆ no.35
- Aljoša PISNIK no.27
- Ivan KOVAČEVIĆ no.16
- Miroslav KNEZ no.2
- Tihomir BRCKAN
- Darko NERAL
- Alen FRANJKOVIĆ
- Jure GAJŠEK
- Trpimir PIRAGIĆ
