= 1977–78 Yugoslav Ice Hockey League season =

1977–1978 season of the Yugoslav Ice Hockey League

The 1977–78 Yugoslav Ice Hockey League season was the 36th season of the Yugoslav Ice Hockey League, the top level of ice hockey in Yugoslavia. Four teams participated in the league, and Jesenice won the championship.

== Regular season ==
	Club
1.	Jesenice
2.	Olimpija
3.	Medveščak
4.	Kranjska Gora
