= 1950–51 Yugoslav Ice Hockey League season =

1950–1951 season of the Yugoslav Ice Hockey League

The 1950–51 Yugoslav Ice Hockey League season was the ninth season of the Yugoslav Ice Hockey League, the top level of ice hockey in Yugoslavia. Four teams participated in the league, and Partizan won the championship.

== Regular season ==
	Club	GP	W	T	L	GF	GA	Pts
1.	Partizan	3	3	0	0	31	2	6
2.	Mladost	3	2	0	1	17	16	4
3.	Ljubljana	3	1	0	2	8	18	2
4.	Zagreb	3	0	0	3	6	26	0
