= Serbian Cup (ice hockey) =

The Serbian Cup was the national ice hockey cup in Serbia and Montenegro and Serbia.

== Champions ==
Season	Winner
Yugoslav Cup
1992	SKHL Crvena zvezda
1995	HK Partizan
1996	SKHL Crvena zvezda
1997	SKHL Crvena zvezda
1998	SKHL Crvena zvezda
1999	HK Vojvodina
2000	HK Vojvodina
2001	HK Vojvodina
Serbian Cup
2007	annulled

=== All-time champions ===
- Including titles in Yugoslavia

Club	Winners	Winning years
Crvena zvezda	5	1980, 1992, 1996, 1997, 1998
Partizan	3	1966, 1986, 1995
Vojvodina	3	1999, 2000, 2001
