= 1954–55 Yugoslav Ice Hockey League season =

1954–1955 season of the Yugoslav Ice Hockey League

The 1954–55 Yugoslav Ice Hockey League season was the 13th season of the Yugoslav Ice Hockey League, the top level of ice hockey in Yugoslavia. Six teams participated in the league, and Partizan won the championship.

== Standings ==
1. Partizan
2. Zagreb
3. Ljubljana
4. Mladost
5. Red Star
6. Papirničar Vevče
