= 1953–54 Yugoslav Ice Hockey League season =

1953–1954 season of the Yugoslav Ice Hockey League

The 1953–54 Yugoslav Ice Hockey League season was the 12th season of the Yugoslav Ice Hockey League, the top level of ice hockey in Yugoslavia. Six teams participated in the league, and Partizan won the championship.

== Regular season ==
	Club	GP	W	T	L	GF	GA	Pts
1.	Partizan	5	5	0	0			10
2.	Jesenice	5	4	0	1			8
3.	Zagreb	5	2	0	3	18	16	4
4.	Mladost	5	2	0	3	17	17	4
5.	Ljubljana	5	2	0	3	9	20	4
6.	Spartak Subotica	5	0	0	5			0
