= Balkan League (ice hockey) =

Balkan ice hockey league, 1994-1997

- Sport: Ice hockey
- Founded: 1994
- Folded: 1997
- Most titles: HK Partizan Belgrade, CSA Steaua Bucuresti, CS Sportul Studenţesc Bucharest (1)

The Balkan League was a multi-nation ice hockey league contested from 1994–1997 by three countries from the Balkan region of Europe: FR Yugoslavia, Romania, and Bulgaria.

== Champions ==
Season	Champion
1994–95	(Serbia) HK Partizan Belgrade, Yugoslavia
1995–96	CSA Steaua Bucuresti, Romania
1996–97	CS Sportul Studenţesc Bucharest, Romania

== See also ==
- Panonian League
- Slohokej League
- Interliga
