= 1946–47 Yugoslav Ice Hockey League season =

1946–1947 season of the Yugoslav Ice Hockey League

The 1946–47 Yugoslav Ice Hockey League season was the sixth season of the Yugoslav Ice Hockey League, the top level of ice hockey in Yugoslavia. Four teams participated in the league, and Mladost won the championship.

== Standings ==
| | Club | GP | W | T | L | GF | GA | Pts |
|---|---|---|---|---|---|---|---|---|
| 1. | Mladost Zagreb | 3 | 3 | 0 | 0 | 31 | 0 | 6 |
| 2. | HK Triglav | 3 | 2 | 0 | 1 | 20 | 5 | 4 |
| 3. | Spartak Subotica | 3 | 0 | 1 | 2 | 2 | 29 | 1 |
| 4. | Red Star | 3 | 0 | 1 | 2 | 1 | 29 | 1 |
