= Burke Henry =

Canadian ice hockey player

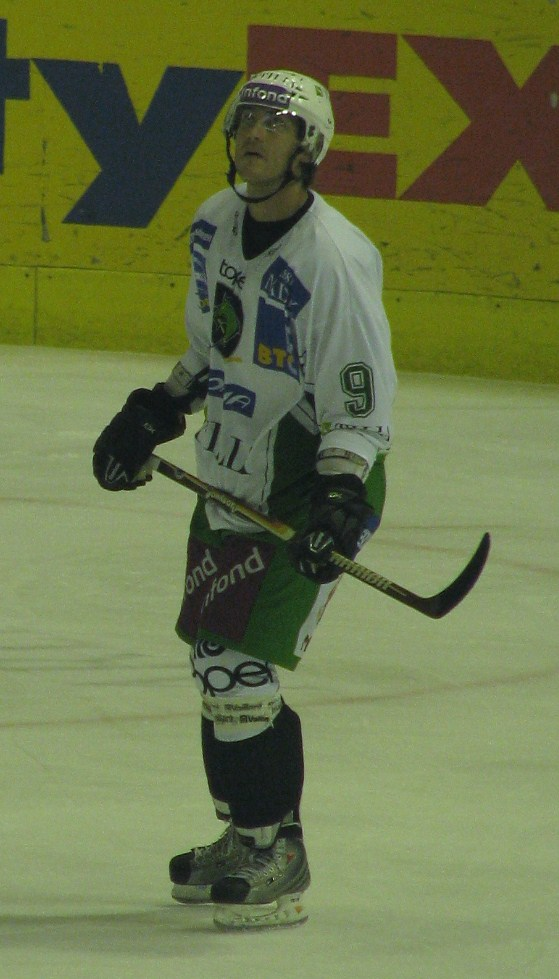
- Burke Henry playing for HDD Olimpija Ljubljana during a game in 2009
- Born: January 21, 1979 (age 47) Ste. Rose du Lac, Manitoba, Canada
- Height: 6 ft 4 in (193 cm)
- Weight: 220 lb (100 kg; 15 st 10 lb)
- Position: Defence
- Shot: Left
- Played for: Chicago Blackhawks; EC Red Bull Salzburg; Tappara; Linköpings HC; Aalborg Pirates; HDD Olimpija Ljubljana; Orli Znojmo; Nikko Icebucks
- NHL draft: 73rd overall, 1997; New York Rangers
- Playing career: 1999–2014

Burke Henry (born January 21, 1979) is a Canadian former professional ice hockey defenceman who played in the National Hockey League for the Chicago Blackhawks. He was drafted by the New York Rangers and got to play with his childhood hero Wayne Gretzky. He played several seasons throughout Europe. He last played with Nikko Icebucks of the Asia League Ice Hockey. He then spent 2014-2017 Coaching the Icebucks in Japan.

In the hockey season of 2017–18, he coached for the RHA Nationals Elite Academy. In 2018, he moved to Miami Beach, Florida and became part of an elite real estate group. He is an expert in home finance. He is a licensed Mortgage broker in NJ, Texas, FL, Virginia. He lives in the city of Boca Raton with his wife, Vanessa Sidi.

== Playing career ==
Henry was drafted 73rd overall by the New York Rangers in the 1997 NHL entry draft He played two years with the American Hockey League's Hartford Wolf Pack, winning the Calder Cup in 2000. He was traded to the Calgary Flames in 2001. He was injured in training camp, with a broken ankle. He was then sent to AHL with the Saint John Flames. In 2002, he signed with the Chicago Blackhawks where he played in NHL. Over two seasons, Henry played 39 regular season games for Chicago, scoring 2 goals and 6 assists for 8 points, collecting 33 penalty minutes.

After spells in the AHL for the San Antonio Rampage and the Milwaukee Admirals during the lockout, Henry moved to Europe in 2005, joining EC Red Bull Salzburg of the Austrian Hockey League. In 2006, Henry moved to Finland's SM-liiga and played for Tappara. Henry moved to Sweden's Elitserien in 2007 for Linköpings HC but left the team mid-season and joined Danish team AaB Ishockey based in Aalborg.

== Career statistics ==
			Regular season					Playoffs
Season	Team	League	GP	G	A	Pts	PIM	GP	G	A	Pts	PIM
1995–96	Brandon Wheat Kings	WHL	50	6	11	17	58	19	0	4	4	19
1996–97	Brandon Wheat Kings	WHL	55	6	25	31	81	6	1	3	4	4
1997–98	Brandon Wheat Kings	WHL	72	18	65	83	153	18	3	16	19	37
1998–99	Brandon Wheat Kings	WHL	68	18	58	76	151	5	1	6	7	9
1999–00	Hartford Wolf Pack	AHL	64	3	12	15	47	5	0	0	0	2
2000–01	Hartford Wolf Pack	AHL	80	8	30	38	133	5	0	0	0	2
2001–02	Saint John Flames	AHL	58	0	17	17	92	—	—	—	—	—
2002–03	Chicago Blackhawks	NHL	16	0	2	2	9	—	—	—	—	—
2002–03	Norfolk Admirals	AHL	60	6	22	28	121	9	1	2	3	9
2003–04	Chicago Blackhawks	NHL	23	2	4	6	24	—	—	—	—	—
2003–04	Norfolk Admirals	AHL	53	1	8	9	70	8	0	1	1	4
2004–05	San Antonio Rampage	AHL	24	0	2	2	44	—	—	—	—	—
2004–05	Milwaukee Admirals	AHL	16	0	3	3	28	1	0	0	0	0
2005–06	EC Salzburg	EBEL	45	8	13	21	72	11	2	2	4	28
2006–07	Tappara	Liiga	52	1	3	4	151	5	0	1	1	6
2007–08	Linköping HC	SHL	9	1	2	3	6	—	—	—	—	—
2007–08	AaB Ishockey	Denmark	35	3	17	20	38	5	0	2	2	20
2008–09	AaB Ishockey	Denmark	44	5	18	23	106	5	0	4	4	8
2009–10	Flint Generals	IHL	7	1	3	4	2	—	—	—	—	—
2009–10	Olimpija Ljubljana	EBEL	31	11	7	18	104	5	1	3	4	8
2010–11	Olimpija Ljubljana	EBEL	25	4	4	8	34	8	0	1	1	12
2012–13	Orli Znojmo	EBEL	49	6	14	20	42	5	0	1	1	6
2013–14	Nikko Ice Bucks	Asia League	24	4	7	11	16	—	—	—	—	—
NHL totals			39	2	6	8	33	—	—	—	—	—
AHL totals			355	18	94	112	535	28	1	3	4	17

== Awards and achievements ==
- Named to the WHL East First All-Star Team in 1998
- Named to the WHL East Second All-Star Team in 1999
