= Ernest Aljančič Jr. =

Slovenian ice hockey player and official (1945–2021)

Ernest Aljančič
- Born: May 5, 1945; Ljubljana, Slovenia, Yugoslavia
- Died: August 21, 2021 (aged 76); Ljubljana, Slovenia
- Position: Centre (C)
- Played for: HDD Olimpija Ljubljana
- National team: Yugoslavia
- Playing career: ??–??

Ernest "Nestl" Aljančič (5 May 1945 – 21 August 2021) was a Slovenian ice hockey player and ice hockey official.

== Career ==
Ernest Aljančič was born in Ljubljana, the son of Slovenian ice hockey player Ernest Aljančič. He became an ice hockey player for HDD Olimpija Ljubljana for fifteen seasons. He also played six matches for the Yugoslavia national ice hockey team.

Aljančič was the President of the Ice Hockey Federation of Slovenia for fifteen years.
