= 1995–96 Balkan League season =

This was the 1995–96 Balkan League season, the second season of the multi-national ice hockey league. Six teams participated in the league, and Steaua Bucuresti of Romania won the championship by defeating Sportul Studentesc Bucharest in the final.

== Regular season ==
	Club	GP	W	T	L	GF–GA	Pts
1.	Sportul Studentesc Bucharest	10	8	0	2	49:27	16
2.	Steaua Bucuresti	10	8	0	2	83:25	16
3.	KHK Crvena Zvezda	10	7	0	3	46:20	14
4.	Slavia Sofia	10	4	0	6	41:42	8
5.	HK Vojvodina	10	2	0	8	29:73	4
6.	HC Levski Sofia	10	1	0	9	23:84	2

== Playoffs ==
=== Semifinals ===
- Steaua Bucuresti - KHK Crvena Zvezda 5–3
- Sportul Studentesc Bucharest - Slavia Sofia 8–3

=== 3rd place ===
- KHK Crvena Zvezda - Slavia Sofia 5–1

=== Final ===
- Steaua Bucuresti - Sportul Studentesc Bucharest 8–2
