= 1994–95 Balkan League season =

Ice hockey league season

This was the 1994–95 Balkan League season, the first season of the multi-national ice hockey league. Six teams participated in the league, and Partizan Belgrade of Serbia won the championship.

== Regular season ==
	Club	GP	W	T	L	GF–GA	Pts
1.	Partizan Belgrade	10	10	0	0	55:21	20
2.	SC Miercurea Ciuc	10	6	1	3	47:22	12
3.	KHK Crvena Zvezda	10	5	0	5	47:47	9
4.	Sportul Studentesc Bucharest	10	2	2	6	31:53	6
5.	Slavia Sofia	10	2	2	6	26:44	5
6.	HC Levski Sofia	10	2	1	7	23:42	4
