= 1997–98 Slovenian Hockey League season =

The 1997–98 Slovenian Ice Hockey League season was the seventh season of the Slovenian Hockey League. Olimpija won the league championship.

== First round ==
Place	Team	Pts	GP	W	T	L	GF–GA	Diff
1	Bled	28	16	13	2	1	119–23	+96
2	Jesenice	28	16	13	2	1	152–27	+125
3	Olimpija	25	16	11	3	2	151–18	+133
4	Slavija	21	16	10	1	5	90–66	+34
5	Kranjska Gora	16	16	8	0	8	60–75	–15
6	Maribor	12	16	6	0	10	49–92	–43
7	Celje	8	16	4	0	12	70–121	–51
8	Triglav Kranj	4	16	2	0	16	42–150	–108
9	HDK Bled	2	16	1	0	15	28–179	–151

== Final round ==
=== Group A ===
Place	Team	Pts	GP	W	T	L	GF–GA	Diff
1	Olimpija	21	12	9	2	1	53–21	+32
2	Jesenice	19	12	7	3	2	50–27	+23
3	Bled	14	12	4	3	5	35–34	+1
4	Slavija Ljubljana	0	12	0	0	12	17–73	–56

=== Group B ===
Place	Team	Pts	GP	W	T	L	GF–GA	Diff
1	Maribor	29	16	12	2	2	90–40	+50
2	Kranjska Gora*	26	15	10	2	3	91–42	+49
3	Celje*	16	15	6	2	7	73–78	–5
4	Triglav Kranj	16	16	6	3	7	65–88	–23
5	HDK Bled	1	16	0	1	15	37–118	–81

== Play-offs ==
=== Final ===
- Olimpija (1) – Jesenice (2): 4–0 (4–3, 4–3, 7–2, 2–1)

=== 3rd place ===
- Bled (3) – Slavija (4): 3–0 (4–1, 8–2, 5–4)
