= 1996–97 Balkan League season =

Ice hockey season

The 1996–97 Balkan League season was the third and final season of the multi-national ice hockey league. Four teams participated in the league, and Sportul Studentesc Bucharest won the championship.

== Regular season ==
	Club	GP	W	T	L	GF–GA	Pts
1.	Sportul Studentesc Bucharest	6	6	0	0	31:11	12
2.	HC Sfantu-Gheorghe	6	3	0	3	23:21	6
3.	KHK Crvena Zvezda	6	3	0	3	33:25	6
4.	HC Belgrade	6	0	0	6	17:47	0
