= 1936–37 Yugoslav Ice Hockey League season =

1936–1937 season of the Yugoslav Ice Hockey League

The 1936–37 Yugoslav Ice Hockey League season was the inaugural season of the Yugoslav Ice Hockey League. The championship was won by Ilrija, which was recognized as the best Yugoslav team at the time by the national federation.
