= 1938–39 Yugoslav Ice Hockey League season =

1938–1939 season of the Yugoslav Ice Hockey League

The 1938–39 Yugoslav Ice Hockey League season was the third season of the Yugoslav Ice Hockey League, the top level of ice hockey in Yugoslavia. Four teams participated in the league, and Ilirija won the championship.

== Teams ==
- Ilirija
- ZKD Zagreb
- Marathon Zagreb
- HAŠK Zagreb

== Tournament ==
=== Semifinals ===
- 5.1.1939 ZKD Zagreb – Marathon Zagreb 2–0 (0–0, 2–0, 0–0)
- 5.1.1939 Ilirja – HAŠK Zagreb 6–0 (Hašk Zagreb forfeited due to late arrival to the tournament, Ilirja was awarded 6–0 victory.)

=== 3rd place ===
- 6.1.1939 HAŠK Zagreb – Marathon Zagreb 5–3 (1–0, 3–2, 1–1)

=== Final ===
- 6.1.1939 Ilirija – ZKD Zagreb 11–0 (6–0, 2–0, 3–0)

== Final ranking ==
1. Ilirija
2. ZKD Zagreb
3. HAŠK Zagreb
4. Marathon Zagreb

== Champions ==
Ice Rihar, Tone Pogačnik. Luce Žitnik, Jule Kačič, Karel Pavletič, Oto Gregorič, Viljem Morbacher, Milan Lombar, Jože Gogala.
