= 1939–40 Yugoslav Ice Hockey League season =

1939–1940 season of the Yugoslav Ice Hockey League

The 1939–40 Yugoslav Ice Hockey League season was the fourth season of the Yugoslav Ice Hockey League, the top level of ice hockey in Yugoslavia. Four teams participated in the league, and Ilirija won the championship.

== Teams ==
- Ilirija
- ZKD Zagreb
- Marathon Zagreb
- HAŠK Zagreb

== Qualification ==
- 6.1. Palić – VŠD ?:?
- 7.1. Marathon Zagreb – Palić 8:3

== Tournament ==
=== Semifinals ===
- 13.1.1940 Ilirija – Marathon Zagreb 4–1 (0–0, 3–0, 1–1)
- 13.1.1940 ZKD Zagreb – HAŠK Zagreb 4–2 (1–0, 0–1, 3–1)

=== 3rd place ===
- 14.1.1940 Marathon Zagreb – HAŠK Zagreb 5–4 (0–1, 2–2, 3–1)

=== Final ===
- 14.1.1940 Ilirija Ljubljana – ZKD Zagreb 5–0 (3–0, 1–0, 1–0)

== Final ranking ==
1. Ilirija
2. ZKD Zagreb
3. Marathon Zagreb
4. HAŠK Zagreb

== Champions ==
Ice Rihar, Luce Žitnik, Jule Kačič, Kroupa, Oto Gregorčič, Jože Gogala, Mirko Eržen, Karel Pavletič, Ernest Aljančič, Viljem Morbacher.
