= 1947–48 Yugoslav Ice Hockey League season =

1947–1948 season of the Yugoslav Ice Hockey League

The 1947–48 Yugoslav Ice Hockey League season was the seventh season of the Yugoslav Ice Hockey League, the top level of ice hockey in Yugoslavia. Six teams participated in the league, and Partizan won the championship.

== Regular season ==
=== Group A ===
	Club	GP	W	T	L	GF	GA	Pts
1.	Partizan	2	2	0	0	25	3	4
2.	Ljubljana	2	1	0	1	15	5	2
3.	Tekstilac Varaždin	2	0	0	2	3	21	0

=== Group B ===
	Club	GP	W	T	L	GF	GA	Pts
4.	Spartak Subotica	2	2	0	0	7	4	4
5.	Zagreb	2	1	0	1	9	3	2
6.	Udarnik Karlovac	2	0	0	2	2	11	0
