= Slobodan Aljančić =

Serbian mathematician

Slobodan Aljančić (Serbian Cyrillic: Слободан Аљанчић; 12 March 1922, Belgrade – 19 March 1993 Belgrade) was a Serbian mathematician who worked on functional analysis.
