= Slovenian Ice Hockey League =

Top-level ice hockey league of Slovenia

Slovenian Championship
- Sport: Ice hockey
- Founded: 1991
- Founder: Ice Hockey Federation of Slovenia
- No. of teams: 6
- Country: Slovenia
- Most recent champion: HK Olimpija (21st title)
- Most titles: HK Olimpija (21 titles) (Note: Including phoenix club HDD Olimpija Ljubljana.)
- Website: hokej.si

The Slovenian Hockey League (Slovene: Slovenska hokejska liga) or the National Championship (Slovene: Državno prvenstvo Slovenije) is the highest level ice hockey league in Slovenia. The championship phase is contested after the regular season to determine the national champion.

== History ==
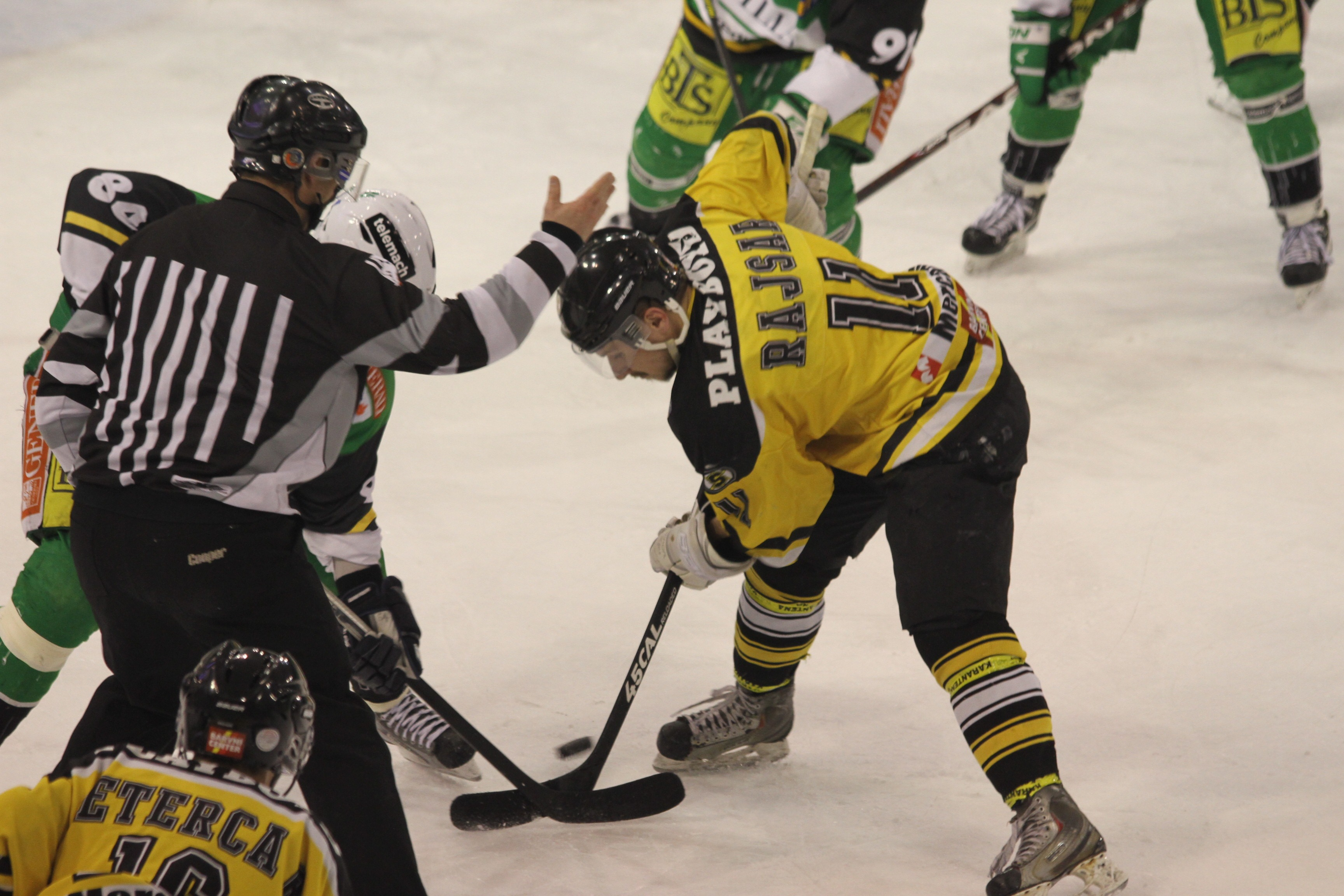
Olimpija vs Slavija at Tivoli Hall in the 2012–13 Slovenian Hockey League season

The Slovenian Hockey League was firstly contested in the 1991–92 season, with the championship being held at the end as the play-offs. Over time, some Slovenian teams entered the Austrian Hockey League, and joined only for the play-offs. In the 2007–08 season there was an issue, as the Croatian team Medveščak qualified for the play-offs. As the Slovenian champion could only be a team from Slovenia, they did not take part in the play-offs. The Slohokej League was established and played its first season in 2009–10, but was cancelled after the 2011–12 season.

== Teams ==
Team	City	Arena	Founded
2026–27 teams
Celje	Celje	Celje Ice Hall	1998
HK Olimpija	Ljubljana	Tivoli Hall	2004
Maribor	Maribor	Tabor Ice Hall	1993
HD Jesenice	Jesenice	Podmežakla Hall	1998
Slavija Junior	Ljubljana	Zalog Ice Hall	2008
Triglav Kranj	Kranj	Zlato Polje Ice Hall	1968
Former teams
Alfa	Ljubljana	Zalog Ice Hall	2005
HDD Bled	Bled	Bled Ice Hall	2010
HDD Jesenice	Jesenice	Podmežakla Hall	2014
HDD Olimpija	Ljubljana	Tivoli Hall	1928
HKMK Bled	Bled	Bled Ice Hall	1999
HK Jesenice	Jesenice	Podmežakla Hall	1948
Kranjska Gora	Kranjska Gora	Podmežakla Hall	1961
Slavija	Ljubljana	Zalog Ice Hall	1964
Team Jesenice	Jesenice	Podmežakla Hall	2013
Tivoli	Ljubljana	Tivoli Hall	N/A
Medveščak Zagreb	(Croatia) Zagreb	Dom Sportova	1961
Medveščak Zagreb II	(Croatia) Zagreb	Dvorana Velesajam	2003
Mladost	(Croatia) Zagreb	Dvorana Velesajam	1946
Zagreb	(Croatia) Zagreb	Dvorana Velesajam	1982
Crvena zvezda	(Serbia) Belgrade	Pionir Ice Hall	1946

== Winners ==
- until 1991 – Yugoslav Hockey League
- 1991–92 – HK Acroni Jesenice
- 1992–93 – HK Acroni Jesenice
- 1993–94 – HK Acroni Jesenice
- 1994–95 – HK Olimpija Hertz
- 1995–96 – HK Olimpija Hertz
- 1996–97 – HK Olimpija Hertz
- 1997–98 – HK Olimpija Hertz
- 1998–99 – HK Olimpija
- 1999–2000 – HK Olimpija
- 2000–01 – HK Olimpija
- 2001–02 – HDD Olimpija
- 2002–03 – HDD ZM Olimpija
- 2003–04 – HDD ZM Olimpija
- 2004–05 – HK Acroni Jesenice
- 2005–06 – HK Acroni Jesenice
- 2006–07 – HDD ZM Olimpija
- 2007–08 – HK Acroni Jesenice
- 2008–09 – HK Acroni Jesenice
- 2009–10 – HK Acroni Jesenice
- 2010–11 – HK Acroni Jesenice
- 2011–12 – HDD Tilia Olimpija
- 2012–13 – HDD Telemach Olimpija
- 2013–14 – HDD Telemach Olimpija
- 2014–15 – HDD Jesenice
- 2015–16 – HDD Telemach Olimpija
- 2016–17 – HDD SIJ Acroni Jesenice
- 2017–18 – HDD SIJ Acroni Jesenice
- 2018–19 – HK SŽ Olimpija
- 2019–20 – No winners (COVID-19 pandemic)
- 2020–21 – HDD SIJ Acroni Jesenice
- 2021–22 – HK SŽ Olimpija
- 2022–23 – HK SŽ Olimpija
- 2023–24 – HK SŽ Olimpija
- 2024–25 – HK Olimpija
- 2025–26 – HK Olimpija

Club	Titles	Years won
HDD Olimpija / HK Olimpija (Note: The two clubs are officially separate legal entities; however, the Ice Hockey Federation of Slovenia recognize the titles of the defunct clubs.)	21	1995, 1996, 1997, 1998, 1999, 2000, 2001, 2002, 2003, 2004, 2007, 2012, 2013, 2014, 2016, 2019, 2022, 2023, 2024, 2025, 2026
HK Jesenice / HDD Jesenice	13	1992, 1993, 1994, 2005, 2006, 2008, 2009, 2010, 2011, 2015, 2017, 2018, 2021

== See also ==
- Slohokej League
- Slovenian Ice Hockey Cup
- Yugoslav Ice Hockey League
