= KHL Varaždin =

- City: Varaždin, Croatia
- Founded: 1935
- Home arena: Sloboda Ice Arena

Franchise history
- Klub Hokeja na Ledu Varaždin

KHL Varaždin, former known as KHL Varaždin, is a Croatian ice hockey team that is located in Varaždin.

It was formed in 1935. The strongest the club got was while it played in the Yugoslavian Hockey League, though it did not remain there long. In the 1948/49 Yugoslav 1st league the club was called HK Tekstilac Varaždin, getting 4th place out of nine. In 1956/57 the club returned to the first league, funded by the company Drvodjelac. The club's name was HK Drvodjelac Varazdin, and it finished in 5th(last) place. The club since then has had difficulties, falling into the second division of the Yugoslav league, and eventually dropping out of that altogether. Today the club still exists but is in hard times. Its skating season in winter is limited due to not having an indoor arena. The club sometimes plays inline hockey, in order to keep the skaters in condition.
