= Ernest Aljančič =

Slovenian ice hockey player and official

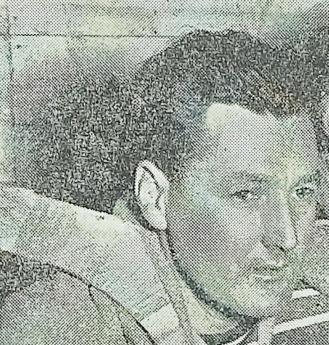
- Born: December 5, 1916 Ljubljana, Austria-Hungary
- Died: November 19, 2006 (aged 89) Ljubljana, Slovenia
- Played for: SK Ilrija; HK Ljubljana
- National team: Yugoslavia
- Playing career: 1932–1957

Ernest "Nestl" Aljančič (5 December 1916 – 19 November 2006) was a Slovenian ice hockey player and official.

Aljančič was one of the ice-hockey pioneers in Yugoslavia. As a member of SK Ilrija he participated in the first Yugoslavian ice hockey game against the Kamnik team. He continued to play after the Second World War in the renamed HK Ljubljana team. He also played for the Yugoslavia national ice hockey team in the first international match against the Austria national ice hockey team, where Aljančič scored the first Yugoslav international goal. As a part of the Yugoslavia national team, he participated in the 1951 and 1955 World Ice Hockey Championships, scoring two goals.

In 1957, after a 25-year ice-hockey career, Aljančič retired. He later worked as an official trying to popularise the sport in Slovenia, and helped to build the Hala Tivoli ice-hockey rink and organize the 1966 World Ice Hockey Championships in it. As the first Slovenian, he was inducted into the IIHF Hall of Fame in 2002. In 2007, he was inducted to the Slovenian Hockey Hall of Fame.

His two sons, Ernest Aljančič and Jani Aljančič, have also played ice hockey for Olimpija and the Yugoslavia national ice hockey team. Ernest was also the president of the Ice Hockey Federation of Slovenia for 15 years.
