= HK Acroni Jesenice =

- City: Jesenice, Slovenia
- Founded: 6 January 1948; 78 years ago
- Dissolved: 2012; 14 years ago
- Home arena: Podmežakla Hall
- Colours: Red, black, white

Championships
- Slovenian Champions: 1992, 1993, 1994, 2005, 2006, 2008, 2009, 2010, 2011
- Yugoslav Champions: 1957, 1958, 1959, 1960, 1961, 1962, 1963, 1964, 1965, 1966, 1967, 1968, 1969, 1970, 1971, 1973, 1977, 1978, 1981, 1982, 1985, 1987, 1988

Hokejski klub Acroni Jesenice (English: Acroni Jesenice Hockey Club), commonly referred to as HK Acroni Jesenice or simply Jesenice, was a Slovenian ice hockey team from Jesenice that last played in the Austrian Erste Bank Hockey League and the Slovenian Ice Hockey League. They played their home games at the Podmežakla Hall. Throughout its history, the club was regarded as one of the most successful clubs in Slovenian and Yugoslav ice hockey. In September 2012, the club filed for bankruptcy and was dissolved.

== History ==
=== Before World War II ===
The club's roots date back to the period before World War II, when enthusiasts started skating on a natural ice surface. The name of Karlo Vergles is mentioned most often with regards to these ice hockey beginnings. In the 1940–41 season, the first amateur team was assembled with simple equipment mostly made in the local steel and iron factory. Despite that, Jesenice team lost their first game to Zagreb with just a one-goal difference.

=== After World War II ===
After World War II, ice hockey returned to the Podmežakla Sports Park. In 1948, an ice-hockey/skating section was formed in the local sport society under the leadership of Drago Cerar. The year was also important for the fact that it was the first time that Jesenice played in a proper tournament against Maribor, Brežice and Celje, with Jesenice winning the tournament.

Development of hockey continued in Jesenice in the following years with the opening of the artificial ice hockey surface in 1954, which was the first in former Yugoslavia. The new venue also included a stand for spectators.

In 1956, Jesenice team hired a hockey coach from Czechoslovakia, Zdenek Blaha. In the 1956–57 season, Jesenice won the Yugoslav championship for the first time.

=== The Golden Age ===
After winning the 1957 championship, Jesenice completely dominated the Yugoslav League by winning 15 consecutive championship titles. Most coaches in this period were foreigners, coming from Czechoslovakia. Notable players in this period include Albin Felc, Dušan Brun, Bogo Jan, Ciril Klinar, Viktor Tišler, Vlado Jug, Gorazd Hiti, Franc Smolej, and Rudi Knez.

After the 1971 season, the Yugoslav championship was more or less divided equally between Jesenice and Olimpija. Jesenice have won the league in 1972–73, 1976–77, 1977–78, 1980–81, 1981–82, 1984–85, 1986–87, and 1987–88. Jesenice have also won the 1974 championship, but the title was later taken away from them by the ice hockey federation. Notable about this period is that the majority of players came from Jesenice or neighboring cities.

=== After the Slovenian independence (1991 to 2012) ===
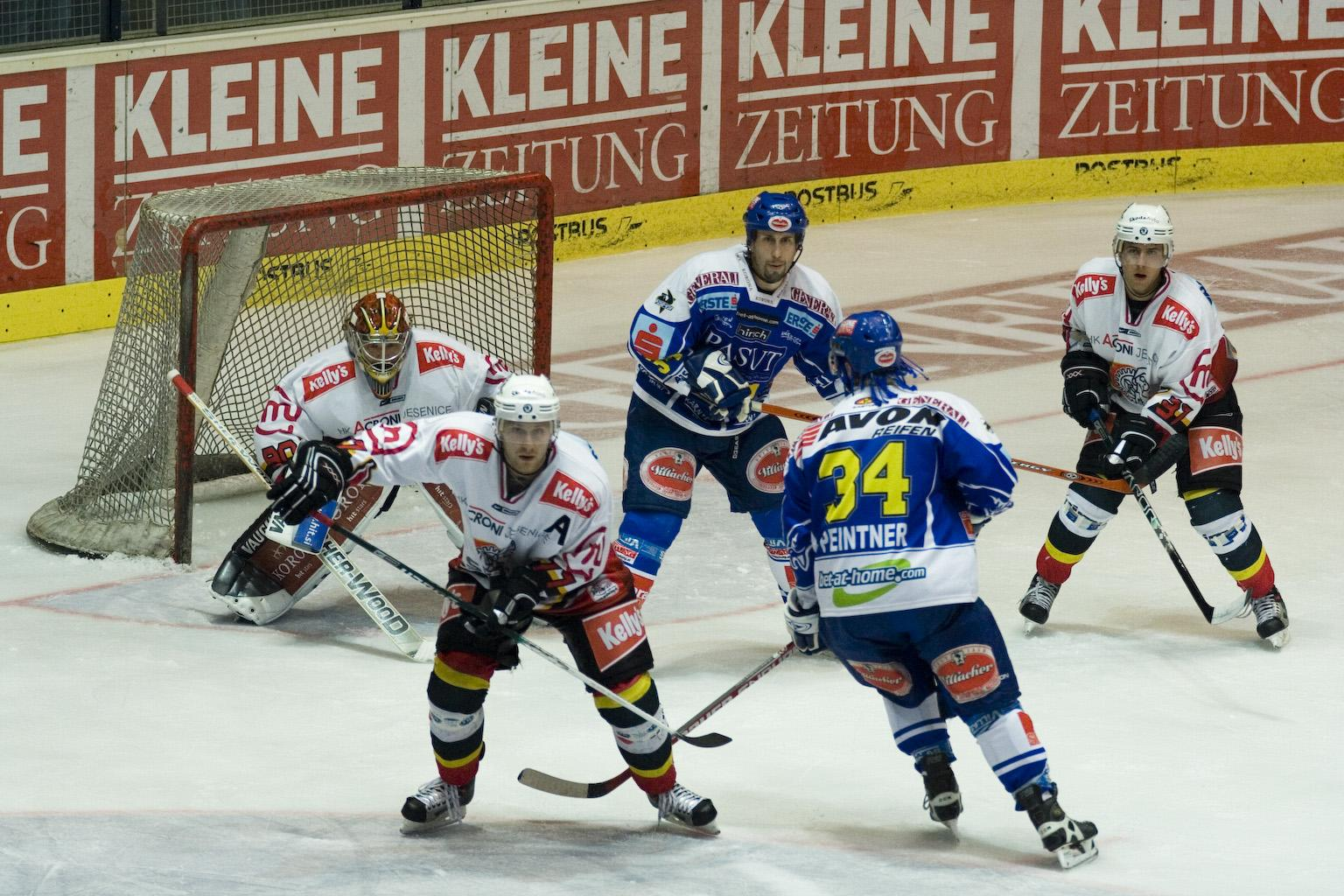
Jesenice vs. VSV EC in 2006

First years after the Slovenian independence were again dominated by the Jesenice team. Alongside local players, the team was reinforced by players from the former Soviet Union under the coaching of Vladimir Krikunov. This resulted in three consecutive championship titles. However, financial and staff problems brought the team to the brink of collapse. The peak of these troubles was the exclusion of Jesenice team from the Slovenian championships in the 1998–99 season.

It took a couple of years for Jesenice to bounce back and in the 2004–05 season, with the arrival of four players from Olimpija, Jesenice won the championship for the first time in over ten years.

in 2006, Jesenice were invited as the first non-Austrian team to play in the expanded Austrian ice hockey championships. From 2006 and until 2012 the club has also won four more Slovenian titles (2008, 2009, 2010, and 2011).

=== Bankruptcy and dissolution ===
The club had accumulated debt, reportedly near €2.5 million, at the conclusion of the 2011–12 EBEL season, and was eventually expelled from the league. On 31 August 2012, HK Acroni Jesenice filed for bankruptcy and were dissolved. Their affiliate HD Mladi Jesenice were registered and run separately from the main squad.

== Arena ==
The team played their home matches at the Podmežakla Hall, a 4,500 capacity multi-purpose indoor hall in Jesenice.

== Honours ==
- Yugoslav Ice Hockey League

Winners (23): 1956–57 – 1970–71, 1972–73, 1976–77, 1977–78, 1980–81, 1981–82, 1984–85, 1986–87, 1987–88
Runners-up (13): 1953–54, 1955–56, 1971–72, 1973–74, 1974–75, 1975–76, 1978–79, 1979–80, 1982–83, 1983–84, 1985–86, 1988–89, 1989–90

- Yugoslav Ice Hockey Cup

Winners (8): 1967, 1968, 1970, 1971, 1973, 1974, 1976, 1977

- Slovenian Championship

Winners (9): 1991–92, 1992–93, 1993–94, 2004–05, 2005–06, 2007–08, 2008–09, 2009–10, 2010–11
Runners-up (9): 1994–95, 1995–96, 1996–97, 1997–98, 1999–2000, 2000–01, 2001–02, 2002–03, 2011–12

- Interliga

Winners (2): 2004–05, 2005–06

- Rudi Hiti Summer League

Winners (6): 1992, 1993, 2005, 2006, 2009, 2011

== Coaches ==
Year	Coach		Honours
1963–1966	(Czechoslovakia)	Jiŕi Pleticha	3x Yugoslav Champion
1966–1967	(Czechoslovakia)	Rudi Černy	1x Yugoslav Champion
1967–1969	(Czechoslovakia)	Oldrich Mlcoch	2x Yugoslav Champion
1969–1972	(Slovenia)	Ciril Klinar	2x Yugoslav Champion
1972–1974	(Soviet Union)	Boris Afanasiev	1x Yugoslav Champion
1974–1975	(Socialist Federal Republic of Yugoslavia)	Jože Trebušak	
1975–1976	(Czechoslovakia)	Rudi Černy	
1976–1978	(Czechoslovakia)	Vlastimil Bubník	2x Yugoslav Champion
1978–1979	(Socialist Federal Republic of Yugoslavia)	Ciril Klinar	
1979–1982	(Socialist Federal Republic of Yugoslavia)	Boris Svetlin	2x Yugoslav Champion
1982–1983	(Socialist Federal Republic of Yugoslavia)	Albin Felc	
1983–1985	(Socialist Federal Republic of Yugoslavia)	Boris Svetlin	
1985–1987	(Socialist Federal Republic of Yugoslavia)	Roman Smolej	2x Yugoslav Champion
1987–1988	(Czechoslovakia)	Vaclav Červeny	1x Yugoslav Champion
1988–1989	(Socialist Federal Republic of Yugoslavia)	Rudi Hiti	
1989–1990	(Socialist Federal Republic of Yugoslavia)	Ciril Klinar	
1989–1990	(Czechoslovakia)	Vaclav Červeny	
1990–1991	(Czechoslovakia)	Jan Selvek	
1991–1993	(Russia)	Vladimir Krikunov	2x Slovenian Champion
1993–1995	(Russia)	Sergey Borisov	1x Slovenian Champion
1995–1996	(Slovenia)	Drago Mlinarec	
1996–1997	(Canada)	Paul Arsenault	
1996–1997	(Slovenia)	Franci Žbontar	
1997–1998	(Canada)	Zdenek Uher	
1997–1998	(Slovenia)	Drago Mlinarec	
1998–1999	(Slovenia)	Pavle Kavčič	
1999–2001	(Czech Republic)	Vaclav Červeny	
2001–2002	(Slovenia)	Pavle Kavčič	
2002–2006	(Slovenia)	Roman Pristov	2x Slovenian Champion
2006–2007	(Slovenia)	Matjaž Kopitar	EBEL: 5th place
2007–2008	(Canada)	Kim Collins	
2008–2009	(United States)	Douglas Bradley	2x Slovenian Champion; EBEL: 2x Quarterfinals
2009–2009	(Russia)	Ildar Rakhmatullin	
2009–2010	(United States)	Mike Posma	
2010–2012	(Finland)	Heikki Mälkiä	
2012	(Slovenia)	Bojan Magazin	

== Players ==
=== Notable players ===
Slovenia

- Anže Kopitar (Jesenice youth team)
