= HK Celje =

Slovenian ice hockey team

- City: Celje, Slovenia
- League: International Hockey League; Slovenian Championship
- Founded: 1998
- Home arena: Celje Ice Hall
- Colours: Blue, white, yellow
- Head coach: Mark Čepon
- Website: www.hk-celje.si

Hokejski klub Celje (English: Celje Hockey Club) or simply HK Celje is an ice hockey club from Celje, Slovenia. The club was established in 1998. They play their home matches at Celje Ice Hall with a seating capacity for 400 spectators.
