= HDD Olimpija Ljubljana =

HDD Olimpija
- City: Ljubljana, Slovenia
- League: Yugoslav Hockey League (1937–1991); Slovenian Championship (1991–2017); Erste Bank Eishockey Liga (2007–2017)
- Founded: 1928; 98 years ago (as SK Ilirija)
- Operated: 1928–2017
- Dissolved: 2017; 9 years ago
- Home arena: Tivoli Hall (Capacity: 7,000)
- Colors: Green, white, black

Franchise history
- 1928–1941: SK Ilriia
- 1946: HK Udarnik
- 1947: HK Triglav
- 1948: HK Enotnost
- 1949–1961: HK Ljubljana
- 1962–2002: HK Olimpija
- 2002–2017: HDD Olimpija

Championships
- Slovenian Championship: 15 (1995, 1996, 1997, 1998, 1999, 2000, 2001, 2002, 2003, 2004, 2007, 2012, 2013, 2014, 2016)
- Yugoslav Championship: 13 (1937, 1938, 1939, 1940, 1941, 1972, 1974, 1975, 1976, 1979, 1980, 1983, 1984)

Hokejsko drsalno društvo Olimpija Ljubljana, commonly referred to as HDD Olimpija or simply Olimpija, was a Slovenian professional ice hockey club from Ljubljana. They played their home games at the Tivoli Hall. Olimpija has won 13 Yugoslav championships and 15 Slovenian championships. They won ten consecutive titles between 1995 and 2004.

== History ==
The club was founded in 1928 as SK Ilirija. It was the first club on the territory of Yugoslavia to play organized ice hockey under the Canadian rules. In the 2007–08 season, their first in Erste Bank Eishockey Liga, they made it all the way to the Finals, but lost 4 games to 2 against EC Red Bull Salzburg. Following the 2016–17 season, the club was dissolved due to financial debt.

Club names through history

- SK Ilrija (1928–1941)
- HK Udarnik (1946)
- HK Triglav (1947)
- HK Enotnost (1948)
- HK Ljubljana (1949–1961)
- HK Olimpija (1962–1985)
- HK Olimpija Kompas (1985–1991)
- HK Olimpija Hertz (1991–1998)
- HK Olimpija (1999–2002)
- HDD Zavarovalnica Maribor Olimpija (2002–2008)
- HDD Tilia Olimpija (2008–2012)
- HDD Telemach Olimpija (2012–2016)
- HDD Olimpija (2016–2017)

== Arena ==
The team played their home matches at the Tivoli Hall complex, a 7,000 all-seated ice hockey indoor hall in Ljubljana.

== Honours ==
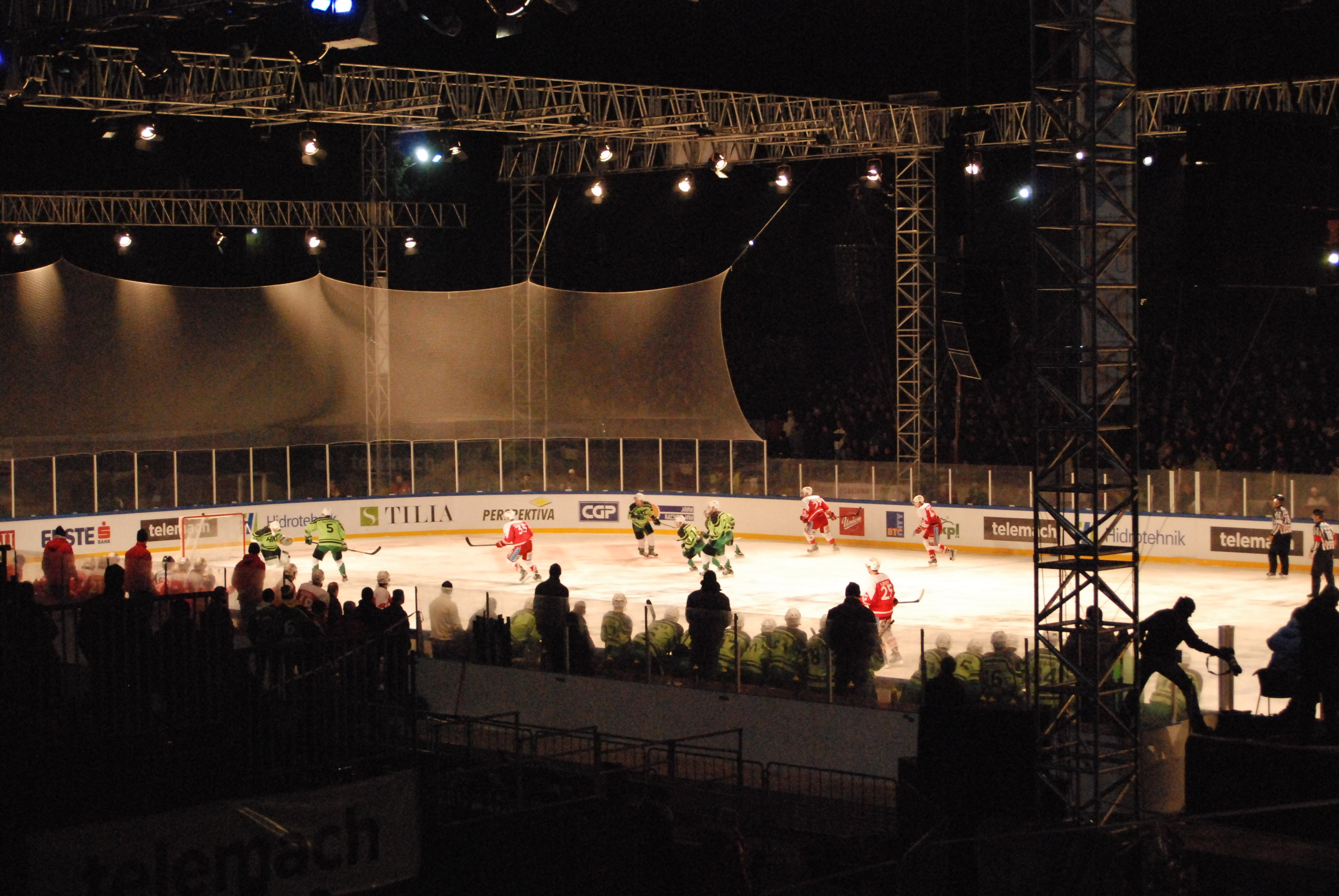
Olimpija vs EC KAC at Bežigrad Stadium in 2012–13 Austrian Hockey League season

- Austrian Hockey League

Runners-up (1): 2007–08

- Yugoslav Ice Hockey League (until 1991)

Winners (13): 1936–37, 1937–38, 1938–39, 1939–40, 1940–41, 1971–72, 1973–74, 1974–75, 1975–76, 1978–79, 1979–80, 1982–83, 1983–84
Runners-up (13): 1947–48, 1957–58, 1958–59, 1964–65, 1969–70, 1970–71, 1972–73, 1976–77, 1977–78, 1980–81, 1981–82, 1987–88, 1990–91

- Yugoslav Ice Hockey Cup (until 1991)

Winners (4): 1969, 1972, 1975, 1987

- Slovenian Championship

Winners (15): 1994–95, 1995–96, 1996–97, 1997–98, 1998–99, 1999–2000, 2000–01, 2001–02, 2002–03, 2003–04, 2006–07, 2011–12, 2012–13, 2013–14, 2015–16
Runners-up (10): 1991–92, 1992–93, 1993–94, 2004–05, 2007–08, 2008–09, 2009–10, 2010–11, 2014–15, 2016–17

- Slovenian Ice Hockey Cup (Note: The first official tournament was played in 2015–16.)

Winners (4): 1993–94, 1995–96, 2000, 2015–16

- Slovenian Ice Hockey Supercup

Winners (2): 1998–99, 2016–17

- Interliga

Winners (2): 2000–01, 2001–02

- Alpenliga

Runners-up (1): 1996–97

- IIHF Federation Cup

Third place (1): 1995

- Karawankencup

Winners (4): 1972–73, 1973–74, 1974–75, 1978–79

- Alpencup

Winners (1): 1971–72

- Rudi Hiti Summer League

Winners (3): 2000, 2002, 2004

== Team captains (since 1988) ==
- (Slovenia) Srdan Kuret, 1988–1991
- (Slovenia) Igor Beribak, 1991–2002
- (Slovenia) Peter Rožič, 2002–2003
- (Russia) Ildar Rahmatullin, 2003–04
- (Slovenia) Damjan Dervarič, 2004–05
- (Slovenia) Mitja Šivic, 2005–06
- (Slovenia) Robert Ciglenečki, 2006–07
- (Slovenia) Tomaž Vnuk, 2007–09
- (United States) Kevin Mitchell, 2009–10
- (Slovenia) Jurij Goličič, 2010
- (Slovenia) Žiga Pance, 2010–12
- (Slovenia) Aleš Mušič, 2012–2017
- (Slovenia) Aleš Mušič and (Slovenia) Andrej Tavželj (co-captains), 2015

== Former NHL players ==
- (Slovenia) Jan Muršak
- (Canada) John Smrke
- (United States) Neil Sheehy
- (Canada) Steve Bozek
- (Canada) Brian MacLellan
- (Canada) Colin Patterson
- (Canada) Alain Côté
- (Canada) Kimbi Daniels
- (Canada) (Slovenia) Ed Kastelic
- (Canada) Kraig Nienhuis
- (Canada) David Haas
- (Canada) Bill McDougall
- (Canada) Len Hachborn
- (Canada) Jason Lafreniere
- (Canada) Kim Issel
- (Canada) Pat Murray
- (Canada) Yves Héroux
- (Canada) Lonnie Loach
- (Canada) Jean-Francois Quintin
- (Canada) Mike Tomlak
- (United States) Chris Corrinet
- (Canada) Manny Malhotra
- (Canada) Brian Willsie
- (Canada) Matt Pettinger
- (Canada) John Jakopin
- (Canada) Ryan Jardine
- (Canada) (Slovenia) Greg Kuznik
- (Canada) Ralph Intranuovo
- (United States) Brian Felsner
- (Canada) Todd Elik
- (Canada) Frank Banham
- (United States) Mike Morrison
- (Canada) Norm Maracle
- (Canada) Remi Royer
- (Canada) Steve Kelly
- (Canada) Matt Higgins
- (Canada) Travis Brigley
- (Canada) Burke Henry
- (Finland) Kari Haakana
- (Canada) Norm Maracle

== Head coaches (since 1989) ==
- (Soviet Union) Nikolai Ladygin, 1989–1990
- (Soviet Union) Alexander Astashev, 1990–1991
- (Slovenia) Štefan Seme, 1991–1992
- (Czech Republic) Peter Janoš, 1992–1993
- (United States) Brad Buetow, 1993–1994
- (Slovenia) Pavle Kavčič, 1994–1995, 1995–1996, 1996–1997
- (Slovenia) Matjaž Sekelj, 1997–1998, 1998–1999
- (Canada) Bud Stefanski, 1998–1999
- (Slovenia) Matjaž Sekelj, 1999–2000
- (Slovenia) Marjan Gorenc, 2000–2001, 2001–2002
- (United States) Chris Imes, 2002–2003
- (Slovenia) Matjaž Sekelj, 2003–2004, 2004–2005
- (Slovenia) Andrej Brodnik, 2005–2006
- (Russia) Ildar Rahmatullin, 2006–2007, 2007–2008
- (United States) Mike Posma, 2007–2008, 2008–2009
- (Canada) Randy Edmonds, 2008–2009
- (Slovenia) Bojan Zajc, 2008–2009
- (Canada) (France) Dany Gelinas, 2009–2010
- (Finland) Hannu Järvenpää, 2009–2012
- (Finland) Heikki Mälkiä, 2012–2012
- (Slovenia) Bojan Zajc, 2012–2014
- (Slovenia) Ivo Jan, 2014
- (Germany) Fabian Dahlem, 2014–2016
- (Slovenia) Bojan Zajc, 2016–2017

== Retired numbers ==
- 24 – Tomaž Vnuk, C, 1987–2009
