= HK Kranjska Gora =

- City: Kranjska Gora, Slovenia
- Founded: 1961; 64 years ago
- Operated: 1962–2006
- Home arena: Podmežakla Hall
- Colours: Red, yellow

Hokejski klub Kranjska Gora (English: Kranjska Gora Hockey Club), commonly referred to as HK Kranjska Gora or simply Kranjska Gora, was an ice hockey team from Kranjska Gora, Slovenia. The club played in both the Yugoslav Ice Hockey League and the Slovenian Hockey League.

== History ==
The club was founded in 1961 and first participated in the Yugoslav Ice Hockey League the following year. The team participated in the Yugoslav League until 1988, when financial issues caused the team to drop out of the league.

HK Kranjska Gora played in the Slovenian Ice Hockey League from 1996–97 until it folded after the 2005–06 season.

== Achievements ==
- Runners-up in the Yugoslav Ice Hockey League: 1967
