= HK Partizan =

- City: Belgrade, Serbia
- League: Serbian Hockey League
- Founded: 1948; 78 years ago
- Home arena: Pionir Ice Hall
- Colors: Black, white
- Head coach: Pavel Kavčič
- Captain: Marko Milovanović

Hokejaški klub Partizan (Serbian Cyrillic: Хокејашки клуб Партизан) is a Serbian professional ice hockey team from Belgrade. HK Partizan is one of the sport clubs that are part of Partizan sport society. They play their home games at the Pionir Ice Hall. The club currently doesn't play in the Serbian Hockey League. HK Partizan has won 20 national championships and three cups, and is the most successful ice hockey team in Serbia. HK Partizan also won the Slohokej League in 2011 and 2012 and Balkan League in 1995.

== History ==
HD Mladi Jesenice vs. Partizan in the 2011–12 Slohokej League season at the Podmežakla Hall

The hockey section in the Partizan sport society was established in 1948, and at their first appearance at the state championship they won its first league title. In the period between 1951 and 1955, Partizan has been by far the strongest hockey team in the country winning 5 consecutive championship titles. Their roster was practically equal to the national team side, consisting of the best hockey players from many different nationalities, from Serbia (Dr. Zlatko Kovačević, Milan Jovanović, Nikola Stanimirović, Gantar Ladocki), Croatia (Josip Brelić, Alfred David, Boris Renaud and Mico Dušanović), from Macedonia (Blažo Piperski), Slovenia (Luce Žitnik), Montenegro (Blažo Mijušković), and in one season Canadian O'Neil (officer of the embassy in Belgrade) helped them with his fantastic games and goals. Later, due to the departure of many crucial players, Partizan lost the primacy to Slovenian clubs in the championship. After a long break, Partizan won the Cup in 1966 and latter in 1986 they won both championship and cup, thus qualifying for European Cup. In the first round they eliminated Romanian champions Steaua, but lost in the second round to Polish champions Polonia Bytom. Partizan's second appearance in European cup came in 1996. They finished last in the first group round, behind Sokil Kyiv, Steaua Bucharest and Levski Sofia.

== Honours ==
Honours		No.	Years
League
Yugoslav Ice Hockey League	Winners	7	1948, 1951, 1952, 1953, 1954, 1955, 1986
Serbian Hockey League	Winners	13	1994, 1995, 2006, 2007, 2008, 2009, 2010, 2011, 2012, 2013, 2014, 2015, 2016
Cups
Yugoslav Ice Hockey Cup	Winners	2	1966, 1986
Serbian Ice Hockey Cup	Winners	1	1995
Regional
Balkan League	Winners	1	1995
Slohokej League	Winners	2	2011, 2012

== 2026/27 roster ==
No.	Nat.	Player	Pos.	S/G	Born	Birthplace
Goaltenders
72	(Russia)	Timofei Bogolyubov	G	L	2007	Saint Petersburg, Russia
1	(Russia)	Rostislav Efremov	G	L	2004	Vladivostok, Russia
	(Serbia)	Filip Ilic	G	-	2007	-
Defensemen
98	(Russia)	Vyacheslav Degterev	D	L	1998	Saint Petersburg, Russia
5	(Serbia)	Vukasin Dindic	D	L	2003	Belgrade, Serbia
22	(Serbia)	Marko Gavric	D	L	2009	-
14	(Serbia)	Petar Peceric	D	R	2005	Subotica, Serbia
21	(Serbia)	Slaven Peceric	D	L	2007	Subotica, Serbia
74	(Serbia)	Lazar Pejcic	D	R	2001	-
7	(Russia)	Roman Sinitsyn	D	L	2000	Yaroslavl, Russia
Forwards
8	(Serbia)	Janko Alijevic	F	R	2005	Belgrade, Serbia
17	(Serbia)	Bogdan Banzic	RW	L	2008	Belgrade, Serbia
19	(Serbia)	Petar Bradic	F	L	2007	Belgrade, Serbia
9	(Serbia)	Vuk Bradic	F	L	2004	-
77	(Serbia)	Antonije Cizmic	C	R	2009	Belgrade, Serbia
11	(Serbia)	Dejan Milovanovic	C	L	2009	-
87	(Serbia)	Andreja Popovic	F	R	2005	-
88	(Serbia)	Mateja Popovic	F	L	2002	-
6	(Serbia)	Vuk Savic	LW/RW	L	2003	Belgrade, Serbia
23	(Serbia)	Dusan Serbula	F	L	2011	-
25	(Russia)	Nikita Shatsky	RW/C	L	1995	Podolsk, Russia
95	(Serbia) (Hungary)	Srdjan Subotic	F	R	2000	Subotica, Serbia

"HK Partizan Beograd – Roster, News, Stats & more". Elite Prospects.

=== Notable former players ===
- (United States) John Murray
- (Slovakia) Martin Surek
- (Socialist Federal Republic of Yugoslavia) Alex Andjelic
- (Socialist Federal Republic of Yugoslavia) Zvonko Mihajlovski
- (Canada) Jocelyn Guimond
