= Joel Prpic =

Canadian-born Croatian ice hockey player

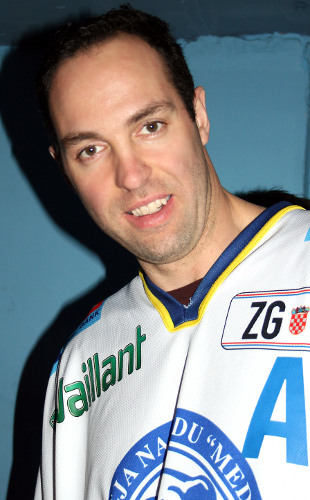
- Born: September 25, 1974 (age 51) Sudbury, Ontario, Canada
- Height: 6 ft 7 in (201 cm)
- Weight: 220 lb (100 kg; 15 st 10 lb)
- Position: Centre
- Shot: Left
- Played for: Boston Bruins; Colorado Avalanche; Seibu Prince Rabbits; KHL Medveščak
- National team: Croatia
- NHL draft: 233rd overall, 1993; Boston Bruins
- Playing career: 1997–2012

Joel Melvin Prpic (Croatian: Prpić; born September 25, 1974) is a Canadian-born Croatian former professional ice hockey player of who played in the National Hockey League with the Boston Bruins and the Colorado Avalanche before ending his career with Croatian team, KHL Medveščak Zagreb, in the Austrian Hockey League.

== Playing career ==
As a towering 6 foot 7 forward for the Waterloo Siskins in the Ontario Minor Hockey Association Prpic was selected in the ninth round, 233rd overall by the Boston Bruins in the 1993 NHL entry draft. Opting to pursue an education Prpic was recruited to play collegiate hockey with St. Lawrence University in the ECAC.

After his senior year and developing as one of the biggest forwards in hockey, Joel turned pro in the 1997–98 season with the Bruins AHL affiliate, the Providence Bruins. Scoring an effective 35 points in 73 games as a checking forward, Prpic made his NHL debut in a solitary game with the Bruins, a playoff-clinching win, against the New York Islanders.

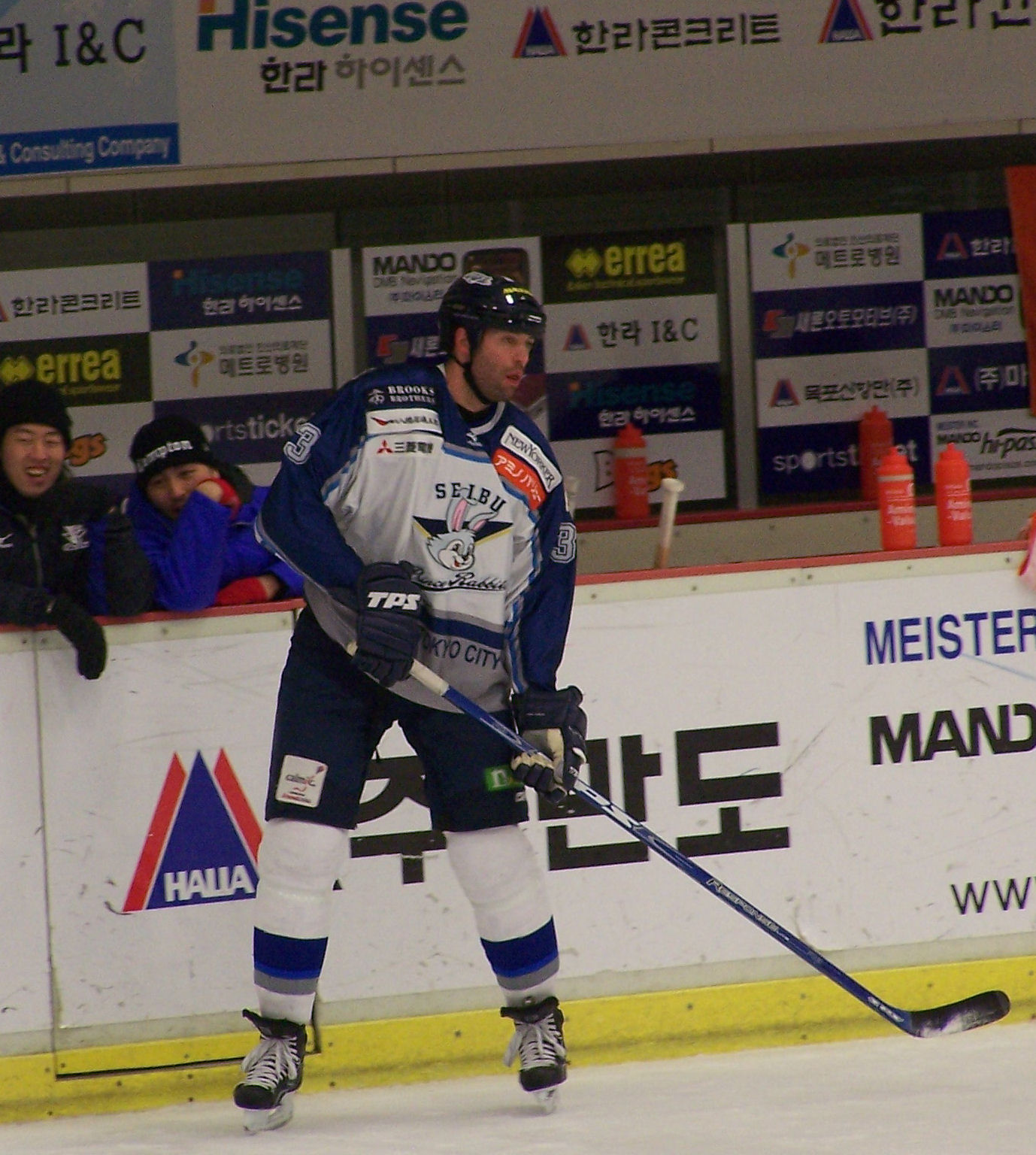
Joel Prpic of the Seibu Prince Rabbits Pre-game January 17, 2009

Returned to Providence for the following season, it was not until the 1999–2000 season in which Joel played a further 14 games with Boston. He recorded his first point on a Cameron Mann goal and had his first multi-point game with another assist on a goal to Steve Heinze in a 5–4 defeat to the Tampa Bay Lightning on April 4, 2000.

On August 29, 2000, Joel then signed a one-year contract as a free agent with the Colorado Avalanche. He was sent to AHL affiliate, the Hershey Bears, for the majority of the 2000–01 season, but played in three games for the eventual Stanley Cup-winning Avalanche, recording two penalty minutes against the Phoenix Coyotes in a 2–1 victory on November 29, 2000. Prpic left the Avalanche in the off-season and signed a one-year deal with the San Jose Sharks on August 15, 2001.

In the 2001–02 season, Prpic never appeared with the Sharks but led the Sharks affiliate, the Cleveland Barons, with 80 games and scoring a professional high 48 points. Prpic left North America the following season having played in just 18 career games in the NHL, 15 for the Boston Bruins and three for the Colorado Avalanche, before joining Kokudo Keikaku Tokyo of the Asia League in the 2002–03 season. Prpic was one of the first notable players to join the developing Asian league and had held the record as the tallest to ever play in the League until Steve McKenna joined the league for the 2006–07 season. He holds the records for the most penalty minutes in a season by receiving 175 in the 2006–07 season.

After his seventh season with the Prince Rabbits organization in the Asia League, Joel left to sign a one-year deal as a free agent with Croat team, KHL Medveščak, of the Erste Bank Eishockey League on September 10, 2009. In signing with Zagreb, Prpic returned to the roots of his ancestors, with eligibility and ambition to play with the Croatian national team.

In the 2009–10 season, Prpic scored 43 points in a team-leading 54 games. On April 20, 2010, he was re-signed to a two-year contract as Medveščak finished seventh in the league. Prpic expressed desire to end his career with KHL Medveščak. After the completion of the 2011–12 season, and representing Croatia for the first time at the 2012 IIHF World Championship Division II, Prpic opted an end to his professional career and pursue a Firefighting career in Canada. Nonetheless, Prpic played for the Croatian national team at the IIHF World Championship Division II in 2013 as well.

Prpic most recently played for the Brantford Blast of the Ontario Hockey Association's Allan Cup Hockey.

== Career statistics ==
=== Regular season and playoffs ===
			Regular season					Playoffs
Season	Team	League	GP	G	A	Pts	PIM	GP	G	A	Pts	PIM
1991–92	Sudbury Nickel Capital Wolves	GNML	—	—	—	—	—	—	—	—	—	—
1991–92	Sudbury Cubs	NOHJL	1	0	0	0	0	—	—	—	—	—
1992–93	Waterloo Siskins	MWJHL	45	17	43	60	160	—	—	—	—	—
1993–94	St. Lawrence University	ECAC	31	2	5	7	88	—	—	—	—	—
1994–95	St. Lawrence University	ECAC	32	7	10	17	62	—	—	—	—	—
1995–96	St. Lawrence University	ECAC	32	3	10	13	77	—	—	—	—	—
1996–97	St. Lawrence University	ECAC	34	10	8	18	57	—	—	—	—	—
1997–98	Providence Bruins	AHL	73	17	18	35	53	—	—	—	—	—
1997–98	Boston Bruins	NHL	1	0	0	0	2	—	—	—	—	—
1998–99	Providence Bruins	AHL	75	14	16	30	163	18	4	6	10	48
1999–00	Providence Bruins	AHL	70	9	20	29	143	14	3	4	7	58
1999–00	Boston Bruins	NHL	14	0	3	3	0	—	—	—	—	—
2000–01	Hershey Bears	AHL	74	16	23	39	128	12	1	1	2	26
2000–01	Colorado Avalanche	NHL	3	0	0	0	2	—	—	—	—	—
2001–02	Cleveland Barons	AHL	80	10	38	48	174	—	—	—	—	—
2002–03	Kokudo	JIHL	29	14	18	32	26	—	—	—	—	—
2003–04	Kokudo	ALH	16	8	25	33	56	—	—	—	—	—
2004–05	Kokudo	AL	34	18	30	48	170	7	1	2	3	24
2005–06	Kokudo	AL	16	7	19	26	48	12	9	7	16	54
2006–07	Seibu Prince Rabbits	AL	24	16	28	44	175	7	8	9	17	16
2007–08	Seibu Prince Rabbits	AL	27	17	30	47	147	—	—	—	—	—
2008–09	Seibu Prince Rabbits	AL	35	13	30	43	174	11	9	7	16	48
2009–10	KHL Medveščak	EBEL	54	15	28	43	143	11	0	4	4	46
2009–10	KHL Medveščak Zagreb II	CRO	—	—	—	—	—	1	0	1	1	0
2010–11	KHL Medveščak	EBEL	51	13	36	49	163	5	0	2	2	12
2010–11	KHL Medveščak Zagreb II	CRO	—	—	—	—	—	3	3	6	9	0
2011–12	KHL Medveščak	EBEL	35	8	22	30	77	5	3	2	5	35
2011–12	KHL Medveščak Zagreb II	CRO	—	—	—	—	—	4	4	6	10	18
2012–13	Brantford Blast	ACH	9	12	10	22	22	10	5	6	11	35
2013–14	Brantford Blast	ACH	21	18	25	43	32	12	10	9	19	42
2014–15	Brantford Blast	ACH	17	18	28	46	26	9	3	6	9	27
2015–16	Brantford Blast	ACH	15	7	22	29	36	9	5	10	15	34
2016–17	Brantford Blast	ACH	15	8	25	33	25	2	1	0	1	14
2017–18	Brantford Blast	ACH	12	10	7	17	24	—	—	—	—	—
AHL totals			372	66	115	181	661	44	8	11	19	132
NHL totals			18	0	3	3	4	—	—	—	—	—

=== International ===
Year	Team	Event	Result	GP	G	A	Pts	PIM
2012	Croatia	WC-D2	3rd	5	3	10	13	2
Senior totals				5	3	10	13	2

Awards and achievements
Preceded by Brad Chartrand	ECAC Hockey Best Defensive Forward; 1996–97	Succeeded by Buddy Wallace
