= 2004–05 Croatian Ice Hockey League season =

- League: Croatian Hockey League
- Sport: Ice hockey
- Regular-season winner: (Croatia) KHL Medveščak
- Champions: (Croatia) KHL Medveščak
- Runners-up: (Croatia) KHL Mladost

Croatian Ice Hockey League seasons
- ← 2003–04 2005–06 →

The Croatian Hockey League Season for 2004–2005 ended in a similar manner to the previous one, with KHL Medveščak winning the title for the ninth time in a row. The team went undefeated in both the regular season and the playoffs. In the finals their opponent was KHL Mladost, as opposed to their old rivals KHL Zagreb.

== Regular season ==
The season officially started with six teams, but due to mostly financial reasons, HK INA Sisak didn't participate. For the same reasons, HASK Zagreb played only two games in the first part of the regular season so the season continued, and finished, with only four teams.

=== Regular Season Standings ===
1. KHL Medveščak Zagreb
2. KHL Zagreb
3. KHL Mladost
4. KHL Medveščak Zagreb II

== Playoffs ==
The first semi-final offered a matchup between Zagreb and Mladost, two teams that developed a rivalry during the season. The tensions were high, but somewhat surprisingly, young players from Mladost showed more composure and won the penalty-filled best-of-three series 2–0, thus advancing to their first final series.

The other semi-final was pretty much a one-sided affair as Medvescak advanced to the finals with two lopsided wins against their farm team, Medveščak II.

Medvescak dominated the final, sweeping the series 3–0 against a young team that looked like they were pleased just to reach this stage and failed to show flair and desire that was expected of them. Nevertheless, Mladost should seriously challenge for the title in the coming years, once their young players grow up (there were several fifteen-, sixteen- and seventeen-year-olds on that team) and gain some valuable experience.

Zagreb won the third-place by winning all 3 games against Medveščak II.

=== Playoff Standings ===
1. KHL Medveščak Zagreb
2. KHL Mladost
3. KHL Zagreb
4. KHL Medveščak Zagreb II
