= 2001–02 Croatian Ice Hockey League season =

- League: Croatian Hockey League
- Sport: Ice hockey
- Regular-season winner: (Croatia) KHL Medveščak
- Champions: (Croatia) KHL Medveščak
- Runners-up: (Croatia) KHL Zagreb

Croatian Ice Hockey League seasons
- ← 2000–01 2002–03 →

The Croatian Hockey League Season for 2001–2002 resulted with KHL Medveščak winning the title for the sixth time in a row.

== Teams ==
- KHL Mladost
- KHL Medveščak Zagreb
- KHL Zagreb
- HK Ina Sisak

== Regular season ==
Rk	Team	GP	W	T	L	GF	GA	Pts
1.	KHL Medveščak Zagreb	12	10	0	2	206	46	17
2.	KHL Zagreb	12	10	0	2	146	28	10
3.	KHL Mladost	12	3	0	9	38	142	9
4.	HK Ina Sisak	12	1	0	11	42	216	0

== Playoffs ==
=== Semifinals ===
The semifinals on 19 and 21 February.

- Medvescak beat Sisak 2–0 in a best of three series. (32–3) and (20–1)
- Zagreb beat Mladost in a best of three series. (7–3) and (18–1)

=== Finals ===
Medvescak beat Zagreb in a best of give series, by 3–2.

- Medvescak – Zagreb 9–4
- Zagreb – Medvešcak 5–1
- Medvescak – Zagreb 8–5
- Zagreb – Medvešcak 4–3 t.a.b.
- Medvescak – Zagreb 4–1

=== Third place ===
Mladost beat Sisak in a best of five series, winning 3–0. Mladost – INA Sisak 6–4 INA Sisak – Mladost 3–6 Mladost – INA Sisak 4–2
