= 1998–99 Croatian Ice Hockey League season =

- League: Croatian Hockey League
- Sport: Ice hockey
- Regular-season winner: (Croatia) KHL Medveščak
- Champions: (Croatia) KHL Medveščak
- Runners-up: (Croatia) KHL Zagreb

Croatian Ice Hockey League seasons
- 1997–98 1999–00

The Croatian Hockey League Season for 1998–1999 resulted with KHL Medveščak winning the title for the third time in a row.

== Teams ==
- KHL Mladost
- KHL Medveščak Zagreb
- KHL Zagreb
- HK Ina Sisak

== Regular season ==
Rk	Team	GP	W	T	L	GF	GA	Pts
1.	KHL Medveščak Zagreb	9	7	0	2	64	27	14
2.	KHL Zagreb	9	6	0	3	49	32	12
3.	KHL Mladost	9	5	0	4	52	36	10
4.	HK Ina Sisak	9	0	0	9	28	98	0

== Playoffs ==
=== Semifinals ===
The semifinals on 13 and 16 February.

- Medvescak beat Sisak 2–0 in a best of three series. (14–5) and (5–0)
- Zagreb beat Mladost 2–1 in a best of three series. (2–5), (6–4) and (4–1)

=== Finals ===
Medvescak swept Zagreb in a best of five series, by 3–0.

- Medvescak – KHL Zagreb (8–4) (3–1) (5–4)

== Third place ==
Sisak forfeited its games to Mladost, so Mladost won third place by default.
