= 1999–2000 Croatian Ice Hockey League season =

2000–01 Croatian Ice Hockey League season
- League: Croatian Hockey League
- Sport: Ice hockey
- Regular-season winner: (Croatia) KHL Medveščak
- Champions: (Croatia) KHL Medveščak
- Runners-up: (Croatia) KHL Zagreb

Croatian Ice Hockey League seasons
- 1998–99 2000–01

The Croatian Hockey League Season for 1999–2000 resulted with KHL Medveščak winning the title for the fourth time in a row.

== Teams ==
- KHL Mladost
- KHL Medveščak Zagreb
- KHL Zagreb
- HK Ina Sisak

== Regular season ==
Rk	Team	GP	W	T	L	GF	GA	Pts
1.	KHL Medveščak Zagreb	12	9	1	2	120	32	19
2.	KHL Zagreb	12	8	1	3	70	43	17
3.	KHL Mladost	12	4	2	6	59	74	10
4.	HK Ina Sisak	12	1	0	11	44	144	2

== Playoffs ==
=== Semifinals ===
The semifinals on 13 and 16 February.

- Medvescak beat Sisak 2–0 in a best of three series. (10–4) and (5–0 (forfeit))
- Zagreb beat Mladost in a best of three series. (8–4) and (8–1)

=== Finals ===
Medvescak swept Zagreb in a best of five series, by 3–0.

- KHL Medvešcak – KHL Zagreb (5–1) (5–2) (4–3)
