= 2008–09 Croatian Ice Hockey League season =

- League: Croatian Hockey League
- Sport: Ice hockey
- Regular-season winner: (Croatia) KHL Medveščak
- Champions: (Croatia) KHL Medveščak
- Runners-up: (Croatia) KHL Mladost

Croatian Ice Hockey League seasons
- 2007–08 2009–10

The Croatian Hockey League Season for 2008–2009 was the 18th such season. It was won by KHL Medveščak, making it the team's twelfth championship in the league.

== Teams ==
- KHL Mladost
- KHL Medveščak Zagreb
- KHL Zagreb
- HK Ina Sisak

== Regular season ==
Rk	Team	GP	W	OTW	OTL	L	GF	GA	Pts
1.	KHL Medveščak Zagreb	6	5	1	0	0	37	15	17
2.	KHL Mladost	6	3	0	1	2	43	23	10
3.	KHL Zagreb	6	3	0	0	3	30	17	9
4.	HK Ina Sisak	6	0	0	0	6	9	64	0

== Playoffs ==
=== Semifinal ===
Medvescak defeated Sisak in the semifinal series 2–0, in a best of three.

- KHL Medveščak – HK Sisak 28:1 (8:0, 7:0, 13:1)
- Medveščak – Sisak 5:0 (Sisak couldn't go on due to lack of players, so they forfeited)

Mladost defeated Zagreb in the semifinal series 2–0, in a best of three.

- KHL Zagreb – KHL Mladost 4:7 (1:2, 2:3, 1:2)
- KHL Mladost – KHL Zagreb 7:2 (2:1, 3:0, 2:1)

=== Final ===
Medvescak beat Mladost 2–0, in a best of three series.

- KHL Medveščak – KHL Mladost 13:3 (2:1, 6:1, 5:1)
- KHL Mladost – KHL Medveščak 1:6 (0:1, 1:1, 0:4)
