= 2014–15 Croatian Ice Hockey League season =

The 2014–15 Croatian Ice Hockey League season was the 24th season of the Croatian Ice Hockey League, the top level of ice hockey in Croatia. KHL Medveščak Zagreb II won the championship by defeating KHL Mladost Zagreb in the final. Many KHL players from Medveščak's top team joined the second team for the playoffs.

== Regular season ==
	Club	GP	W	OTW	OTL	L	Goals	Pts
1.	KHL Mladost Zagreb	18	13	0	1	4	121:53	40
2.	KHL Zagreb	18	11	1	1	5	103:74	36
3.	KHL Medveščak Zagreb II	18	6	1	0	11	110:90	20
4.	KHL Sisak	18	4	0	0	14	55:170	12

== Playoffs ==
=== Semifinals ===
- KHL Mladost Zagreb - KHL Sisak 2:0
  - 25:2 (3:1, 14:0, 8:1)
  - 23:3 (8:0, 7:1, 8:2)
- KHL Zagreb - KHL Medveščak Zagreb II 0:2
  - 3:4 OT (2:0, 1:0, 0:3, 0:1)
  - 1:10 (0:3, 0:4, 1:3)

=== Final ===
- KHL Mladost Zagreb - KHL Medveščak Zagreb II 0:3
  - 2:7 (1:1, 1:4, 0:2)
  - 5:6 (1:4, 1:2, 3:0)
  - 3:10 (2:3, 0:2, 1:5)
