= 2006–07 Croatian Ice Hockey League season =

- League: Croatian Hockey League
- Sport: Ice hockey
- Regular-season winner: (Croatia) KHL Medveščak
- Champions: (Croatia) KHL Medveščak
- Runners-up: (Croatia) KHL Mladost

Croatian Ice Hockey League seasons
- ← 2005–06 2007–08 →

The Croatian Hockey League Season for 2006–2007 was the 16th such season. It was won by KHL Medveščak Zagreb. The season was divided into three parts. The last part determined the champion.

== Teams ==
- KHL Mladost
- KHL Medveščak Zagreb
- KHL Zagreb
- HK Ina Sisak

== Legs ==
=== First leg ===
Rk	Team	GP	W	L	GF	GA	Pts
1.	KHL Medveščak Zagreb	4	4	0	25	12	8
2.	KHL Zagreb	4	1	3	17	20	2
3.	KHL Mladost	4	1	3	14	24	2

=== Second leg ===
Rk	Team	GP	W	L	GF	GA	Pts
1.	KHL Medveščak Zagreb	6	6	0	91	20	12
2.	KHL Zagreb	6	3	3	51	34	6
3.	KHL Mladost	6	3	3	51	21	6
4.	HK Ina Sisak	6	0	6	15	123	0

=== Third Leg(Championship) ===
Rk	Team	GP	W	T	L	GF	GA	Pts
1.	KHL Medveščak Zagreb	4	3	1	0	23	8	10
2.	KHL Mladost	4	2	0	2	18	21	5
3.	KHL Zagreb	4	0	1	3	9	21	4

== Games ==
- 7 October 2006. Medveščak – Mladost 5–4 (3–1, 2–3, 0–0)
- 27 October 2006. Mladost – Zagreb 3–2 (1–0, 0–2, 2–0)
- 2 November 2006. Medveščak – Zagreb 7–1 (1–0, 4–0, 2–1)
- 9 November 2006. Mladost – Medveščak 4–6 (0–2, 1–3, 3–1)
- 12 November 2006. Zagreb – Medveščak 3–7 (2–2, 0–4, 1–1)
- 7 December 2006. Zagreb – Mladost 11–3 (3–2, 1–0, 7–1)
- 27 December 2006. Medveščak – Zagreb 11–2 (5–0, 1–1, 5–1)
- 3 January 2007. Mladost – Zagreb 5–4 (2–2, 1–2, 2–0)
- 22 January 2007. INA – Medveščak 5–27 (0–8, 2–7, 3–12)
- 23 January 2007. Zagreb – Medveščak 7–12 (1–5, 3–4, 3–3)
- 24 January 2007. INA – Mladost 2–18 (1–6, 1–6, 0–6)
- 26 January 2007. INA – Zagreb 4–13 (0–3, 2–7, 2–3)
- 29 January 2007. Zagreb – Mladost 6–2 (1–1, 4–1, 1–0)
- 30 January 2007. Medveščak – INA 23–3 (6–0, 7–1, 10–2)
- 1 February 2007. Mladost – INA 23–2 (10–0, 7–1, 6–1)
- 2 February 2007. Mladost – Medveščak 1–6 (0–2, 0–3, 1–1)
- 3 February 2007. Zagreb – INA 19–0 (4–0, 8–0, 7–0)
- 13 February 2007. Medveščak – Mladost 12–2 (2–0, 6–1, 4–1)
- 17 February 2007. Medveščak – Zagreb 2–2 (1–2, 1–0, 0–0)
- 20 February 2007. Medveščak-Mladost 10–4 (3–0, 2–3, 5–1)
- 23 February 2007. Zagreb-Mladost 1–4 (0–0, 1–1, 0–3)
- 25 February 2007. Zagreb-Medveščak 0–7 (0–4, 0–1, 0–2)
- 27 February 2007. Mladost – Medveščak 2–4 (0–1, 1–1, 1–2)
- 5 March 2007. Mladost-Zagreb 8–6 (5–4, 1–1, 2–1)
