= 1996–97 Croatian Ice Hockey League season =

The 1996–97 Croatian Ice Hockey League season was the sixth season of the Croatian Ice Hockey League, the top level of ice hockey in Croatia. Four teams participated in the league, and KHL Medveščak Zagreb won the championship.

== Regular season ==
	Club	GP	W	T	L	Goals	Pts
1.	KHL Medveščak Zagreb	10	8	2	0	87:28	18
2.	KHL Zagreb	11	6	3	2	92:32	15
3.	KHL Mladost Zagreb	12	4	1	7	66:77	9
4.	INA Sisak	9	0	0	9	20:128	0

== Playoffs ==
=== Semifinals ===
- KHL Medveščak Zagreb – INA Sisak 2:0 (37:2, 5:0 Forfeit)
- KHL Zagreb – KHL Mladost Zagreb 2:1 (3:2, 2:4, 6:4)

=== Final ===
- KHL Medveščak Zagreb – KHL Zagreb 3:0 (7:0, 4:2, 3:2)
