= 2000–01 Croatian Ice Hockey League season =

- League: Croatian Hockey League
- Sport: Ice hockey
- Regular-season winner: (Croatia) KHL Medveščak
- Champions: (Croatia) KHL Medveščak
- Runners-up: (Croatia) KHL Zagreb

Croatian Ice Hockey League seasons
- ← 1999–00 2001–02 →

The Croatian Hockey League Season for 2000–2001 resulted with KHL Medveščak winning the title for the fifth time in a row.

== Teams ==
- KHL Mladost
- KHL Medveščak Zagreb
- KHL Zagreb
- HK Ina Sisak

== Regular season ==
Rk	Team	GP	W	T	L	GF	GA	Pts
1.	KHL Medveščak Zagreb	12	11	0	1	120	28	22
2.	KHL Zagreb	12	9	0	3	129	38	18
3.	KHL Mladost	12	4	0	8	62	101	8
4.	HK Ina Sisak	12	0	0	12	33	177	0

== Playoffs ==
=== Semifinals ===
The semifinals on 13 and 16 February.

- Medvescak beat Sisak 2–0 in a best-of-three series. (23–2) and (23–3)
- Zagreb beat Mladost in a best-of-three series. (8–3) and (5–2)

=== Finals ===
Medvescak beat Zagreb in a best-of-five series, by 3–0. Games were played on 23, 27 Feb., and 2 March. Medvešcak Zagreb – KHL Zagreb (6-5OT) (4–2) (6–1)

=== Third place ===
Mladost beat Sisak in a best-of-five series, winning 3–0. Games were played on 23, 27 Feb., and 4 March.

- Mladost – INA Sisak (9–3) (10–8) (8–6)
