= 1992–93 Croatian Ice Hockey League season =

The 1992–93 Croatian Ice Hockey League season was the second season of the Croatian Ice Hockey League, the top level of ice hockey in Croatia. Four teams participated in the league, Zagreb making championship.

== Regular season ==
	Club	GP	W	T	L	Goals	Pts
1.	Zagreb	15	14	1	0	164:21	29
2.	Mladost	15	8	3	4	84:57	19
3.	Medveščak	15	4	2	9	70:99	10
4.	Sisak	15	1	0	14	24:165	2

== Play-offs ==
=== 3rd place ===
- Medveščak – Sisak 3:0 (15:3, 8:5, 15:2)

=== Final ===
- Zagreb – Mladost 3:0 (8:0, 9:1, 12:0)
