= 2011–12 Croatian Ice Hockey League season =

The 2011–12 Croatian Ice Hockey League season was the 21st season of the Croatian Ice Hockey League, the top level of ice hockey in Croatia. Four teams participated in the league, and KHL Medveščak Zagreb won the championship.

== Regular season ==
	Club	GP	W	OTW	OTL	L	Goals	Pts
1.	KHL Mladost Zagreb	18	14	1	1	2	159:47	45
2.	KHL Medveščak Zagreb	18	10	2	1	5	131:62	29
3.	KHL Zagreb	18	8	0	1	9	98:78	25
4.	INA Sisak	18	1	0	0	17	32:233	3

== Playoffs ==
=== Semifinals ===
- KHL Mladost Zagreb – INA Sisak 2:0 (23:2, 15:2)
- KHL Medveščak Zagreb – KHL Zagreb 2:0 (5:2, 12:3)

=== Final ===
- KHL Mladost – KHL Medveščak 1:3 (8:5, 3:7, 3:10, 3:6)
