= Borna Rendulić =

Croatian ice hockey player

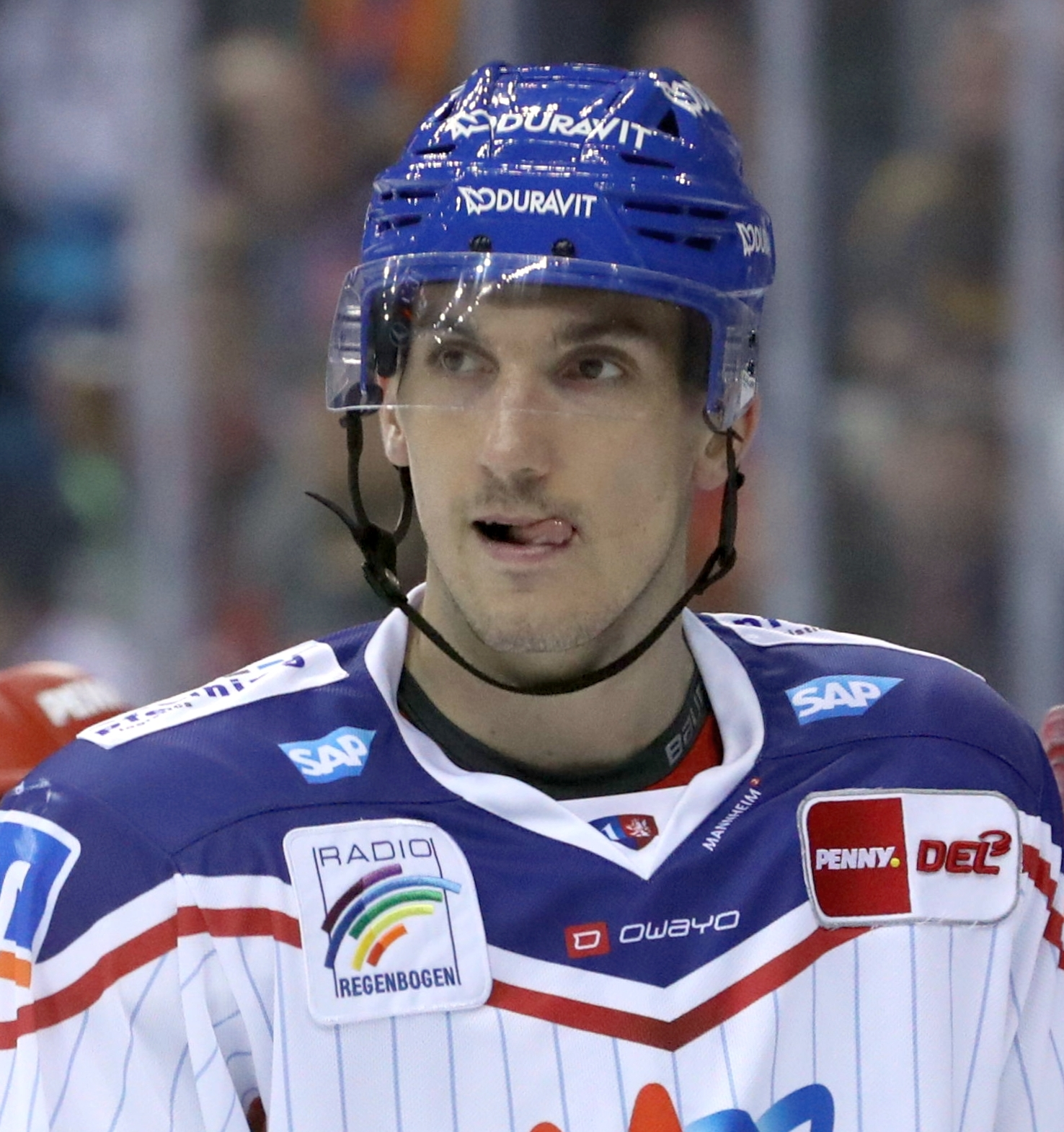
- Rendulić with the Adler Mannheim in 2021
- Born: 25 March 1992 (age 34) Zagreb, Croatia
- Height: 6 ft 4 in (193 cm)
- Weight: 207 lb (94 kg; 14 st 11 lb)
- Position: Right wing
- Shoots: Right
- team Former teams: Admiral Vladivostok; Ässät; HPK; Colorado Avalanche; Vancouver Canucks; Lahti Pelicans; HC Vityaz; Adler Mannheim; Örebro HK; HC Sochi; SKA Saint Petersburg; Metallurg Magnitogorsk; Shanghai Dragons
- National team: Croatia
- NHL draft: Undrafted
- Playing career: 2007–present

Borna Rendulić (Croatian pronunciation: [bôːrna rěndulit͡ɕ], born 25 March 1992) is a Croatian professional ice hockey forward who is currently playing for Admiral Vladivostok of the Kontinental Hockey League (KHL).

Rendulić began playing hockey in Croatia and made his professional debut with KHL Medveščak in 2006, before moving to Finland in 2008 in order to further his career. He played for several teams, first at junior levels, before playing professionally in both the top-tier SM-liiga and second-tier Mestis, then moved to North America in 2014 when he signed a contract with the Colorado Avalanche of the NHL. Rendulić made his NHL debut that year, the first Croatian-trained player to do so, but spent most of the following two seasons with the Avalanche minor-league affiliates in the AHL. After two seasons spent primarily with the Avalanche's AHL affiliate, he signed with the Vancouver Canucks, spending a further season in the AHL with their affiliate before returning to Europe. Internationally, Rendulić has played for Croatia in several World Championships, both at the junior and senior level.

== Playing career ==
As 15-year-old, Rendulić made his professional debut with hometown club, KHL Medveščak in the Croatian Ice Hockey League during the 2006–07 season.

He signed for Ässät in 2008 and played for their U18 team and then their U20 team. On 25 January 2011, he was loaned for the remainder of the 2010–11 season to former club Medveščak, now of the Austrian Hockey League. Rendulić featured in 12 games with Zagreb, collecting a goal and an assist.

Upon returning to Ässät, he finally made his debut for the men's team during the 2011–12 season, playing three games whilst also enduring another loan spell, with SaPKo in Mestis.

On 8 May 2012, out of contract with Ässät, Rendulić agreed to a try-out contract with fellow Liiga club, HPK. With a developing, larged-framed body, Rendulić's initial trial with HPK was successful, earning him a one-year contract on 31 August 2012. In the 2012–13 season, Rendulić predominantly played with HPK in a depth forward role to finish with eight goals in 37 games.

Rendulić was signed to a one-year extension and in the following 2013–14 season, he played his first full Liiga season with HPK, establishing a top-nine position to produce career highs of 11 goals and 32 points in 57 games.

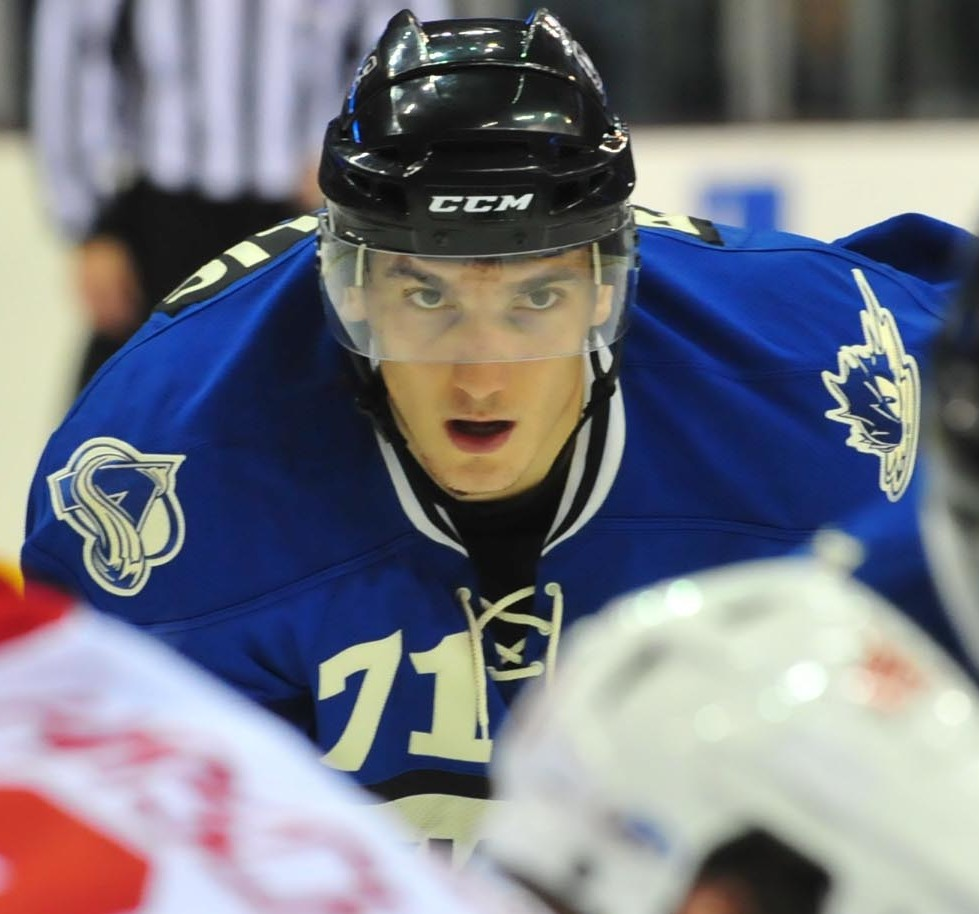
Borna Rendulić on the Lake Erie Monsters

On 19 May 2014, Rendulić's successful season earned NHL recognition, and he was subsequently signed to a two-year entry-level contract with the Colorado Avalanche. In signing with the Avalanche, Rendulić became the first Croatian born and trained player to earn an NHL contract. After his first training camp and pre-season in Colorado, Rendulic was assigned to begin the 2014–15 season with Colorado's American Hockey League (AHL) affiliate, the Lake Erie Monsters. On 9 December 2014, he received his first NHL recall by the injury-hit Avalanche. He became the first Croatian born and trained player to play in the NHL, playing on the Avalanche's fourth-line in a 3–0 defeat to the Nashville Predators. Immediately after his second recall to the Avalanche, Rendulić scored his first NHL goal in his fourth game on 31 December 2014, against Steve Mason of the Philadelphia Flyers. However a broken shinbone limited Rendulić to 11 games in the NHL and 26 in the AHL.

On June 27, 2016, having completed his entry-level deal Rendulić's NHL rights were not retained by the Avalanche. Subsequently, on July 1, 2016, it was announced that Rendulic had signed a one-year, two-way contract with the Vancouver Canucks. He made his debut for the Canucks on February 28 in a game against the Detroit Red Wings. He was a late addition to the lineup, replacing Jannik Hansen who was traded to the San Jose Sharks later that night.

As a free agent from the Canucks, Rendulić opted to return to Europe in securing a one-year deal with Finnish Liiga club, Lahti Pelicans, on August 11, 2017. In his return to the Liiga after three years, he scored 5 goals in the opening 14 games of the 2017–18 season. Rendulić then opted to leave the Liiga prematurely in order to sign with Russian outfit, HC Vityaz of the KHL, on October 18, 2017.

Productive throughout his tenure with HC Vityaz, Rendulić left as a free agent following the 2018–19 season, posting 13 goals and 23 points in 59 games. On June 3, 2019, Rendulić continued his European career by agreeing to a one-year contract with German Champions, Adler Mannheim of the DEL.

Following a year stint in the Swedish Hockey League (SHL) with Örebro HK in the 2020–21 season, Rendulić returned to previous club, Adler Mannheim of the DEL, signing a two-year contract on June 2, 2021.

At the completion of his contract with Adler Mannheim, Rendulić returned for a second stint in the KHL, joining Russian club HC Sochi as a free agent on a one-year contract on 31 May 2023. In the 2023–24 season, Rendulić made just 16 appearances with Sochi, leading the team with 15 points before he was traded to contending club, SKA Saint Petersburg, in exchange for Marat Khusnutdinov on 10 October 2023.

During the 2024–25 season, in the midst of his second season with SKA, Rendulić was traded to Metallurg Magnitogorsk in exchange for Pavel Akolzin on 23 December 2024.

As a free agent from his brief tenure with Metallurg, Rendulić was signed by the Shanghai Dragons to a one-year contract on 17 August 2025.

== Career statistics ==
=== Regular season and playoffs ===
			Regular season					Playoffs
Season	Team	League	GP	G	A	Pts	PIM	GP	G	A	Pts	PIM
2006–07	KHL Medveščak	CIHL	2	0	0	0	2	—	—	—	—	—
2007–08	KHL Medveščak	SLO	2	1	0	1	0	—	—	—	—	—
2010–11	KHL Medveščak	EBEL	12	1	1	2	2	5	1	1	2	6
2011–12	Ässät	SM-l	3	0	0	0	0	—	—	—	—	—
2011–12	SaPKo	Mestis	7	2	3	5	14	—	—	—	—	—
2012–13	HPK	SM-l	37	8	4	12	6	5	0	1	1	0
2012–13	Peliitat	Mestis	5	2	2	4	0	—	—	—	—	—
2013–14	HPK	Liiga	57	11	21	32	34	6	3	0	3	2
2014–15	Colorado Avalanche	NHL	11	1	1	2	6	—	—	—	—	—
2014–15	Lake Erie Monsters	AHL	26	4	4	8	12	—	—	—	—	—
2015–16	Colorado Avalanche	NHL	3	0	0	0	0	—	—	—	—	—
2015–16	San Antonio Rampage	AHL	68	16	22	38	41	—	—	—	—	—
2016–17	Vancouver Canucks	NHL	1	0	0	0	0	—	—	—	—	—
2016–17	Utica Comets	AHL	69	12	11	23	30	—	—	—	—	—
2017–18	Lahti Pelicans	Liiga	14	5	3	8	12	—	—	—	—	—
2017–18	HC Vityaz	KHL	32	8	11	19	16	—	—	—	—	—
2018–19	HC Vityaz	KHL	59	13	10	23	75	4	1	0	1	2
2019–20	Adler Mannheim	DEL	50	27	22	49	51	—	—	—	—	—
2020–21	Örebro HK	SHL	49	17	21	38	70	9	3	2	5	0
2021–22	Adler Mannheim	DEL	36	15	11	26	6	9	2	4	6	29
2022–23	Adler Mannheim	DEL	56	17	24	41	18	12	1	6	7	2
2023–24	HC Sochi	KHL	16	9	6	15	14	—	—	—	—	—
2023–24	SKA Saint Petersburg	KHL	51	11	16	27	10	1	0	0	0	0
2024–25	SKA Saint Petersburg	KHL	11	1	3	4	2	—	—	—	—	—
2024–25	Metallurg Magnitogorsk	KHL	19	2	5	7	2	—	—	—	—	—
2025–26	Shanghai Dragons	KHL	62	20	24	44	16	—	—	—	—	—
Liiga totals			111	24	28	52	52	11	3	1	4	2
NHL totals			15	1	1	2	6	—	—	—	—	—
KHL totals			250	64	75	139	135	5	1	0	1	2

=== International ===
Year	Team	Event	GP	G	A	Pts	PIM
2008	Croatia	WJC18-D2	5	7	5	12	2
2008	Croatia	WJC-D2	5	7	3	10	4
2009	Croatia	WJC18-D2	5	3	3	6	2
2009	Croatia	WJC-D2	4	0	3	3	4
2009	Croatia	WC-D1	5	1	2	3	2
2010	Croatia	WJC-D1	5	4	3	7	0
2010	Croatia	WC-D1	5	0	1	1	0
2011	Croatia	WJC-D1	5	4	5	9	2
2011	Croatia	WC-D2	5	8	9	17	6
2012	Croatia	WJC-D1	5	3	4	7	0
2012	Croatia	WC-D2	5	4	1	5	2
2013	Croatia	OGQ	3	1	1	2	14
2013	Croatia	WC-D2	5	4	4	8	2
2014	Croatia	WC-D1	5	2	2	4	6
2016	Croatia	WC-D1	4	2	5	7	0
2017	Croatia	WC-D1	5	3	5	8	16
2018	Croatia	WC-D1	5	3	0	3	0
2023	Croatia	WC-D2A	5	4	7	11	4
Junior totals			34	28	26	54	14
Senior totals			52	32	37	69	52
