= 1993–94 Croatian Ice Hockey League season =

The 1993–94 Croatian Ice Hockey League season was the third season of the Yugoslav Ice Hockey League, the top level of ice hockey in Croatia. Four teams participated in the league, and KHL Zagreb won the championship.

== Regular season ==
	Club	GP	W	T	L	Goals	Pts
1.	KHL Zagreb	13	10	1	2	88:32	21
2.	KHL Medveščak Zagreb	13	10	1	2	130:52	21
3.	KHL Mladost Zagreb	13	5	0	8	78:85	10
4.	INA Sisak	13	1	0	12	31:158	2

== Playoffs ==
=== Semifinals ===
- KHL Zagreb – INA Sisak 2:0 (14:3, 25:1)
- KHL Medveščak Zagreb – KHL Mladost Zagreb 2:0 (13:3, 12:4)

=== 3rd place ===
- KHL Mladost Zagreb – INA Sisak 2:0 (11:4, 9:2)

=== Final ===
- KHL Zagreb – KHL Medveščak Zagreb 3:2 (6:1, 4:1, 4:5, 2:5, 2:1)
