= 2012–13 Croatian Ice Hockey League season =

The 2012–13 Croatian Ice Hockey League season was the 22nd season of the Croatian Ice Hockey League, the top level of ice hockey in Croatia. KHL Medveščak Zagreb II won the championship by defeating KHL Mladost Zagreb in the final.

== Format ==
The league began the season with four teams, three from Croatia and HDK Maribor from Slovenia. Maribor pulled-out of the championship after the first round. KHL Sisak joined the championship for the second round, which consisted of six games played each. The three Croatian teams that participated in the first round received bonus points which carried over to the second round. KHL Mladost Zagreb received six points, KHL Medveščak Zagreb II received four points, and KHL Zagreb received two points. KHL Sisak started the second round with zero points. All four teams that participated in the second round qualified for the playoffs.

== First round ==
	Club	GP	W	OTW	OTL	L	Goals	Pts
1.	(Slovenia) HDK Maribor	12	11	0	0	1	86:24	33
2.	(Croatia) KHL Mladost Zagreb	12	6	0	2	4	62:57	20
3.	(Croatia) KHL Medveščak Zagreb II	12	3	1	0	8	41:71	11
4.	(Croatia) KHL Zagreb	12	2	1	0	9	41:78	8

== Second round ==
	Club	GP	W	OTW	OTL	L	Goals	Pts
1.	KHL Medveščak Zagreb II	6	5	0	0	1	35:18	19
2.	KHL Mladost Zagreb	6	4	0	0	2	53:31	18
3.	KHL Zagreb	6	3	0	0	3	32:36	11
4.	KHL Sisak	6	0	0	0	6	22:57	0

== Playoffs ==
=== Semifinals ===
- KHL Mladost Zagreb - KHL Zagreb 2:0 (7:3, 11:2)
- KHL Medveščak Zagreb II - KHL Sisak 2:0 (5:0 Forfeit, 5:0 Forfeit)

=== Final ===
- KHL Medveščak Zagreb II - KHL Mladost Zagreb 3:2 (6:5, 3:8, 3:8, 5:3, 7:3)
