= 1994–95 Croatian Ice Hockey League season =

Ice hockey season

The 1994–95 Croatian Ice Hockey League season was the fourth season of the Yugoslav Ice Hockey League, the top level of ice hockey in Croatia. Four teams participated in the league, and KHL Medveščak Zagreb won the championship.

== Regular season ==
	Club	GP	W	T	L	Goals	Pts
1.	KHL Zagreb	11	10	1	0	88:14	21
2.	KHL Medveščak Zagreb	11	6	1	4	67:25	13
3.	KHL Mladost Zagreb	10	3	0	7	27:47	6
4.	INA Sisak	11	1	0	10	13:121	2

== Playoffs ==
=== 3rd place ===
- KHL Mladost Zagreb – INA Sisak 2:1 (2:4, 5:3, 4:1)

=== Final ===
- KHL Zagreb – KHL Medveščak Zagreb 3:2 (3:2, 3:5, 2:3, 2:1, 4:2) (*)

(*) Forfeited by KHL Zagreb, KHL Medveščak Zagreb is awarded title.
