= 1995–96 Croatian Ice Hockey League season =

The 1995–96 Croatian Ice Hockey League season was the fifth season of the Yugoslav Ice Hockey League, the top level of ice hockey in Croatia. Four teams participated in the league, and Zagreb have won the championship.

== Regular season ==
	Club	GP	W	T	L	Goals	Pts
1.	KHL Mladost Zagreb	15	13	0	2	112:23	26
2.	KHL Zagreb	15	11	0	4	108:33	22
3.	KHL Medveščak Zagreb	15	6	0	9	106:59	12
4.	INA Sisak	15	0	0	15	16:227	0

== Playoffs ==
=== 3rd place ===
- KHL Medveščak Zagreb – INA Sisak 2:0 (16:4, 11:3)

=== Final ===
- KHL Mladost Zagreb – KHL Zagreb 0:3 (1:4, 2:6, 2:6)
