= 1997–98 Croatian Ice Hockey League season =

The 1997–98 Croatian Ice Hockey League season was the seventh season of the Croatian Ice Hockey League, the top level of ice hockey in Croatia. Four teams participated in the league, and KHL Medveščak Zagreb won the championship.

== Regular season ==
| | Club | GP | W | T | L | Goals | Pts |
|---|---|---|---|---|---|---|---|
| 1. | KHL Medveščak Zagreb | 12 | 10 | 1 | 1 | 86:39 | 21 |
| 2. | KHL Mladost Zagreb | 12 | 8 | 1 | 3 | 131:46 | 17 |
| 3. | KHL Zagreb | 12 | 5 | 0 | 7 | 68:65 | 10 |
| 4. | INA Sisak | 12 | 0 | 0 | 12 | 29:164 | 0 |

== Playoffs ==
=== 3rd place ===
- KHL Zagreb – INA Sisak 2:0 (7:0, 11:2)

=== Final ===
- KHL Medveščak Zagreb – KHL Mladost Zagreb 3:1 (3:4, 3:2, 4:1, 7:5)
