= 2007–08 Croatian Ice Hockey League season =

- League: Croatian Hockey League
- Sport: Ice hockey
- Regular-season winner: (Croatia) KHL Medveščak
- Champions: (Croatia) KHL Mladost
- Runners-up: (Croatia) KHL Medveščak

Croatian Ice Hockey League seasons
- 2006–07 2008–09

The Croatian Ice Hockey League Season for 2006–2007 was the 17th season. It was won by KHL Mladost, making it the team's first championship in the league. This put an end to the eleven straight season championship run by KHL Medveščak.

== Teams ==
- KHL Mladost
- KHL Medveščak
- KHL Zagreb

== Regular season ==
Rk	Team	GP	W	L	GF	GA	Pts
1.	KHL Medveščak	4	4	0	35	9	12
2.	KHL Mladost	4	2	2	24	23	6
3.	KHL Zagreb	4	0	4	12	39	0

== Playoffs ==
Medveščak automatically qualified for the final.

=== semifinal ===
Mladost defeated Zagreb in the semifinal series 2–0, in a best of three.

- KHL Mladost – KHL Zagreb 5:0 (2:0,2:0,1:0)
- KHL Zagreb – KHL Mladost 1:18 (0:8,1:6,0:4)

=== final ===
Mladost went on to stun Medveščak, winning the finals 3–1, in a best of five.

- KHL Medveščak – KHL Mladost 3:8 (0:2,2:1,1:5)
- KHL Mladost – KHL Medveščak 1:2 (0:1,1:1,0:0)
- KHL Medveščak – KHL Mladost 2:3 SO (2:1,0:0,0:1)
- KHL Mladost – KHL Medveščak 7:4 (3:0, 1:2,3:2)
