= 2009–10 Croatian Ice Hockey League season =

- League: Croatian Hockey League
- Sport: Ice hockey
- Teams: 4

2009–10
- Regular-season winner: KHL Mladost

Croatian Ice Hockey League seasons
- 2008–09 2010–11

The Croatian Hockey League Season for 2009–2010 was the 19th such season. The regular season was won by KHL Mladost and the playoffs were won by KHL Medveščak II.

== Teams ==
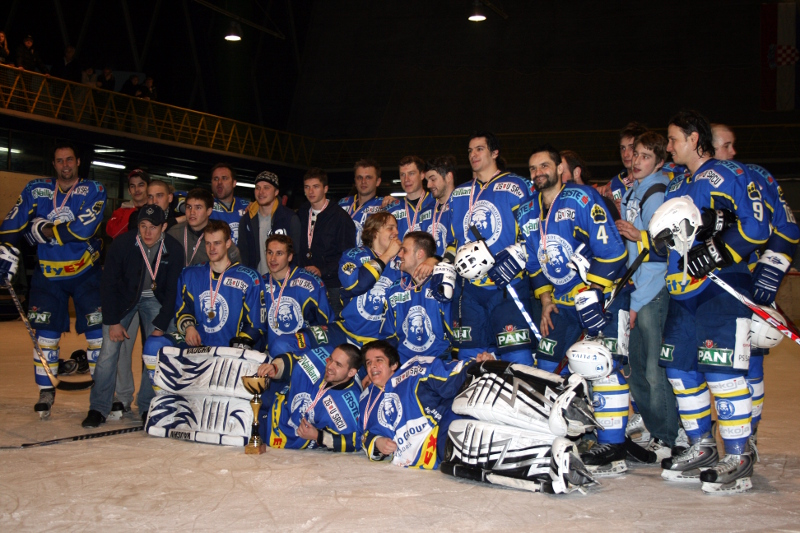
KHL Medveščak II – champions in 2009–10 Croatian Ice Hockey League season

- KHL Mladost
- KHL Medveščak II
- KHL Zagreb
- HK Ina Sisak

== Regular season ==
The regular season was won by KHL Mladost.

Rk	Team	GP	W	L	OTW	OTL	SOL	GF	GA	Pts
1.	KHL Mladost	6	5	1	0	0	0	71	21	15
2.	KHL Medveščak II	6	5	1	0	0	0	42	16	15
3.	KHL Zagreb	6	2	4	0	0	0	33	48	6
4.	HK Ina Sisak	6	0	6	0	0	0	13	74	0

== Playoffs ==
=== Semifinals ===
- KHL Medveščak Zagreb II – HK Sisak 2:0 (16:5, 16:5)
- KHL Mladost Zagreb – KHL Zagreb 2:0 (8:6, 11:4)

=== 3rd place game ===
- KHL Zagreb – HK Sisak 13:4

=== Final ===
- KHL Medveščak Zagreb II – KHL Mladost Zagreb 2:0 (5:2, 6:3)
