= 2002–03 Croatian Ice Hockey League season =

Croatian sports league season

The 2002–03 Croatian Ice Hockey League season was the 12th season of the Croatian Ice Hockey League, the top level of ice hockey in Croatia. Four teams participated in the league, and KHL Medveščak Zagreb won the championship.

== Regular season ==
	Club	GP	W	T	L	Goals	Pts
1.	KHL Medveščak Zagreb	12	10	0	2	206:46	20
2.	KHL Zagreb	12	10	0	2	146:28	20
3.	KHL Mladost Zagreb	12	3	0	9	38:142	6

== Playoffs ==
=== Semifinals ===
- KHL Medveščak Zagreb – INA Sisak 2:0 (25:1, 7:1)
- KHL Zagreb – KHL Mladost Zagreb 2:0 (1:0, 1:0)

=== 3rd place ===
- KHL Mladost Zagreb – INA Sisak 3:0 (1:0, 5:0 Forfeit, 9:1)

=== Final ===
- KHL Medveščak Zagreb – KHL Zagreb 3:2 (5:2, 3:4 n.V., 3:5, 3:2 n.P., 6:2)
