= 2005–06 Croatian Ice Hockey League season =

The 2005–06 Croatian Ice Hockey League season was the 15th season of the Croatian Ice Hockey League, the top level of ice hockey in Croatia. Four teams participated in the league, and KHL Medveščak Zagreb won the championship.

== Regular season ==
	Club	GP	W	T	L	Goals	Pts
1.	KHL Medveščak Zagreb	6	6	0	0	58:15	12
2.	KHL Mladost Zagreb	6	3	1	2	46:26	7
3.	KHL Zagreb	6	2	1	3	37:44	5
4.	INA Sisak	6	0	0	6	7:83	0

== Playoffs ==
=== Semifinal ===
- KHL Mladost Zagreb – KHL Zagreb 2:1 (5:6, 6:2, 4:3 n.V.)

=== Final ===
- KHL Medveščak Zagreb – KHL Mladost Zagreb 3:0 (5:4, 7:3, 8:4)
