= 1991–92 Croatian Ice Hockey League season =

The 1991–92 Croatian Ice Hockey League season was the first season of the league after the dissolution of the Yugoslav Ice Hockey League the previous year. Three teams participated in the league, and KHL Zagreb won the inaugural championship.

== Regular season ==
| | Club | GP | W | T | L | Goals | Pts |
|---|---|---|---|---|---|---|---|
| 1. | KHL Zagreb | 6 | 6 | 0 | 0 | 56:8 | 12 |
| 2. | KHL Medveščak Zagreb | 6 | 1 | 2 | 3 | 20:36 | 4 |
| 3. | KHL Mladost Zagreb | 6 | 0 | 2 | 4 | 13:44 | 2 |
