= Domagoj Kapec =

Croatian ice hockey player

- Born: 10 December 1989; Zagreb, SR Croatia, SFR Yugoslavia
- Died: 10 September 2008 (aged 18); Zagreb, Croatia
- Height: 5 ft 11 in (180 cm)
- Weight: 198 lb (90 kg; 14 st 2 lb)
- Position: Defence
- Shot: right
- Played for: KHL Medveščak Zagreb
- National team: Croatia
- Playing career: 2003–2008

Domagoj Kapec (10 December 1989 – 10 September 2008) was a Croatian ice hockey player who last played for KHL Zagreb. He was born in Zagreb, the capital of today's Croatia.

== International career ==
He had already played for the Croatia national ice hockey team 3 IIHF World U20 Championship and 3 IIHF World U18 Championships.

== Career ==
- (Croatia) KHL Karlovac (2003–2004)
- (Croatia) KHL Zagreb (2005–2006)
- (Croatia) KHL Medveščak Zagreb (2006–2007)
- (Croatia) KHL Zagreb (2007–2008)

Statistics:

- KHL Karlovac Croatian League 03/04
- Croatia national ice hockey team WJC18 d2 05 5 0 0 0 -1 0
- KHL Medveščak Zagreb Croatian League 05/06
- KHL Medveščak Zagreb Slovenian League 05/06 21 0 2 2 33
- Croatia national ice hockey team WJC18 d2 06 5 0 1 1 0 14
- Croatia national ice hockey team WJC d2 06 5 0 0 0 0 0
- KHL Medveščak Zagreb International League 06/07 3 0 0 0 0 0
- KHL Medveščak Zagreb Croatian Junior League 06/07 6 3 2 5 10
- KHL Medveščak Zagreb Croatian League 06/07 9 3 3 6 6
- Croatia national ice hockey team WJC18 d2 07 5 0 3 3 +2 14
- Croatia national ice hockey team WJC d2 07 5 2 0 2 +3 4
- KHL Zagreb Panonian League 07/08 7 1 0 1 -8 4
- KHL Zagreb Croatian Junior League 07/08 14 11 4 15 +7 65
- KHL Medveščak Zagreb Croatian League 07/08 4 1 0 1 -8 6 2 0 1 1 -7 2
- Croatia national ice hockey team WJC d2 08 5 0 0 0 +6 6

== Death ==
He was severely injured in a car accident in Zagreb on 7 September 2008 and died on 10 September in hospital.

== Titles ==
- Croatian champion 2007 with KHL Medveščak Zagreb
