= Croatian Ice Hockey League =

National ice hockey league

Croatian Ice Hockey league
- Sport: Ice Hockey
- Founded: 1991
- Founder: Croatian Ice Hockey Federation
- No. of teams: 4
- Country: Croatia
- Most recent champion: KHL Sisak
- Most titles: Medveščak (22)
- Website: hshl.hr

The Croatian Ice Hockey League is the top ice hockey league in Croatia. The league is operated by the Croatian Ice Hockey Federation.

== History ==
The league was formed in 1991 with the dissolution of Yugoslavia. Until then, Croatian teams played in the Yugoslav Ice Hockey League. The hockey teams Mladost and Medveščak were playing in the first division, while Sisak and Zagreb were playing in the second division of the Yugoslav league. The former two were much stronger, but as financing went away their best players did not stay with the clubs. This resulted in a more balanced competition, in which KHL Zagreb went on to win three times in a row. Medveščak however managed to remerge as the country's dominant team, as it won the competition for eleven straight seasons.

Due to the very short duration of the season, Croatian teams often play in other leagues, such as the Slohokej League, Erste Bank Eishockey Liga, Interliga and Panonian League.

== Teams ==
Team	City	Arena	Capacity	Founded
Current teams
Medveščak Admiral	(Croatia) Zagreb	Admiral Ice Dome	850	2024
Mladost	(Croatia) Zagreb	Dvorana Velesajam	500	1946
Sisak	(Croatia) Sisak	Ledena dvorana Zibel	1,960	1934
Zagreb	(Croatia) Zagreb	Dvorana Velesajam	500	1982

== Champions ==
- until 1991 – Yugoslav Hockey League
- 1991–92 – Zagreb
- 1992–93 – Zagreb
- 1993–94 – Zagreb
- 1994–95 – Medveščak
- 1995–96 – Zagreb
- 1996–97 – Medveščak
- 1997–98 – Medveščak
- 1998–99 – Medveščak
- 1999–00 – Medveščak
- 2000–01 – Medveščak
- 2001–02 – Medveščak
- 2002–03 – Medveščak
- 2003–04 – Medveščak
- 2004–05 – Medveščak
- 2005–06 – Medveščak
- 2006–07 – Medveščak

- 2007–08 – Mladost
- 2008–09 – Medveščak
- 2009–10 – Medveščak
- 2010–11 – Medveščak
- 2011–12 – Medveščak
- 2012–13 – Medveščak
- 2013–14 – Medveščak
- 2014–15 – Medveščak
- 2015–16 – Medveščak
- 2016–17 – Medveščak
- 2017–18 – Medveščak
- 2018–19 – Zagreb
- 2019–20 – Cancelled because of COVID-19 pandemic
- 2020–21 – Mladost
- 2021–22 – Sisak
- 2022–23 – Zagreb
- 2023–24 – Sisak
- 2024–25 – Sisak
- 2025–26 – Sisak

Club	Croatian Championship won	Total
Medveščak	1995, 1997, 1998, 1999, 2000, 2001, 2002, 2003, 2004, 2005, 2006, 2007, 2009, 2010, 2011, 2012, 2013, 2014, 2015, 2016, 2017, 2018	22
Zagreb	1992, 1993, 1994, 1996, 2019, 2023	6
Sisak	2022, 2024, 2025, 2026	4
Mladost	2008, 2021	2
