= International Hockey League (Balkans) =

Ice hockey league in Serbia, Croatia, and Slovenia

- Official logo
- Sport: Ice hockey
- Founded: 2017; 9 years ago
- No. of teams: 9
- Country: Croatia; Serbia; Slovenia
- Continent: Europe
- Most recent champions: Triglav (4th title) (2025–26)
- Most titles: Triglav (4 titles)
- Broadcaster: Hokejska Zveza TV
- Level on pyramid: 1
- Domestic cup: No
- Website: www.ihlhockey.com

The International Hockey League (abbr. IHL) is a regional ice hockey league held since 2017 with clubs from Serbia, Croatia, and Slovenia.

== History ==
In the 2017/18 season, the Ice Hockey Federation of Slovenia established the International Hockey League (IHL) - a competition in which all Slovenian clubs and clubs from abroad could apply. In the inaugural season, Slavija, Celje, Triglav, Bled, Maribor, Medveščak, Mladost, Zagreb, Crvena zvezda and Vojvodina played in the league, while in the 2018/19 season hockey players from Austria joined Slovenian, Croatian and Serbian clubs.

== Current clubs ==
Location of clubs in the 2026–27 season
Red: International Hockey League clubs

Clubs that participate in the 2026–27 season:

International Hockey League

Club	City
(Croatia) Medveščak	Zagreb
(Croatia) Mladost	Zagreb
(Croatia) Zagreb	Zagreb
(Slovenia) Triglav	Kranj
(Slovenia) Slavija Junior	Ljubljana
(Slovenia) Celje	Celje
(Serbia) Crvena zvezda	Belgrade
(Serbia) Partizan	Belgrade
(Serbia) Pro Stars	Novi Sad

== All-time participants ==
The following is a list of clubs who have played in the International Hockey League at any time since its formation in 2017 to the current season.

Canceled	Season was canceled due to the COVID-19 pandemic
1st	Champions
2nd	Runners-up
SF	Semi-finalists
QF	Quarter-finalists
**Bold**	Teams playing in the 2026–27 season
^{R}	Regular season champions

Club	18	19	20	21	22	23	24	25	26	27	Total seasons	Highest finish			
Club	(Slovenia) Bled	QF	–	–	SF	QF	–	–	–	–	Total seasons	Highest finish	–	3	Semi-finals
(Slovenia) **Celje**	2nd	QF	Cn.	SF	QF	SF^{R}	–	–	–	TBD	7	2nd			
(Slovenia) HD Jesenice	–	–	Cn.	QF	SF	–	–	–	–	–	3	Semi-finals			
(Slovenia) HDD Jesenice	–	–	–	–	–	1st	QF	QF	–	Defunct	3	1st			
(Slovenia) Maribor	10th	–	–	–	13th	QF	10th	–	–	–	4	Quarter-finals			
(Slovenia) Olimpija	–	–	–	–	9th	–	–	–	–	–	1	9th			
(Slovenia) Slavija	QF	Defunct									1	Quarter-finals			
(Slovenia) **Slavija Junior**	–	SF	Cn.	2nd	2nd^{R}	QF	QF	1st^{R}	SF	TBD	9	1st			
(Slovenia) **Triglav**	SF^{R}	2nd	Cn.	1st^{R}	1st	2nd	1st	SF	1st^{R}	TBD	10	1st			
(Croatia) **Medveščak**	1st	QF	Cn.	–	12th	–	QF	SF	SF	TBD	8	1st			
(Croatia) **Mladost**	9th	QF	Cn.	–	QF	–	9th	QF	QF	TBD	8	Quarter-finals			
(Croatia) Sisak	–	–	–	–	QF	QF	SF	–	–	–	3	Semi-finals			
Team Croatia Select	–	–	–	–	–	QF	–	–	–	–	1	Quarter-finals			
(Croatia) **Zagreb**	QF	SF	–	–	10th	–	SF	QF	QF	TBD	7	Semi-finals			
(Serbia) **Crvena zvezda**	SF	1st^{R}	Cn.	–	SF	SF	2nd^{R}	2nd	2nd	TBD	9	1st			
(Serbia) **Vojvodina**	QF	QF	Cn.	–	11th	9th	QF	QF	QF	–	8	Quarter-finals			
(Serbia) **Partizan**	–	–	–	–	–	–	–	–	–	TBD	1	TBD			
(Serbia) **Pro Stars**	Unfounded							–	–	TBD	1	TBD			

== Finals ==
Season	Champions	Result	Runners-up
2017/18	(Croatia) Medveščak	2 : 0	(Slovenia) Celje
2018/19	(Serbia) Crvena zvezda	2 : 0	(Slovenia) Triglav
2019/20	Canceled due to the COVID-19 pandemic – no champion announced		
2020/21	(Slovenia) Triglav	3 : 0	(Slovenia) Slavija Junior
2021/22	(Slovenia) Triglav	2 : 1	(Slovenia) Slavija Junior
2022/23	(Slovenia) Jesenice	3 : 1	(Slovenia) Triglav
2023/24	(Slovenia) Triglav	3 : 1	(Serbia) Crvena zvezda
2024/25	(Slovenia) Slavija Junior	3 : 0	(Serbia) Crvena zvezda
2025/26	(Slovenia) Triglav	3 : 1	(Serbia) Crvena zvezda

== Records and statistics ==
=== By club ===
Club	Won	Runner-up	Years won	Years runner-up
(Slovenia) Triglav	4	2	2021, 2022, 2024, 2026	2019, 2023
(Serbia) Crvena zvezda	1	3	2019	2024, 2025, 2026
(Slovenia) Slavija Junior	1	2	2025	2021, 2022
(Slovenia) Jesenice	1	0	2023	
(Croatia) Medveščak	1	0	2018	
(Slovenia) Celje	0	1		2018
Total	8	8		

=== By country ===
Club / Nation	Won	Runner-up	Finals
Slovenia	6	5	11
Serbia	1	3	4
Croatia	1	0	1
Total	8	8	16

== See also ==
- Croatian Ice Hockey League
- Serbian Hockey League
- Slovenian Ice Hockey League
- Yugoslav Ice Hockey League
