= 2003–04 Croatian Ice Hockey League season =

The 2003–04 Croatian Ice Hockey League season was the 13th season of the Croatian Ice Hockey League, the top level of ice hockey in Croatia. Two teams, KHL Medveščak Zagreb, and KHL Zagreb participated in the league, and KHL Medveščak Zagreb won the championship.

== Final ==
- KHL Medveščak Zagreb – KHL Zagreb 3:0 (10:3, 6:3, 7:2)
