= Ivan Puzić =

Croatian ice hockey player (born 1996)

- Born: 15 February 1996 (age 29) Zagreb, Croatia
- Height: 5 ft 10 in (178 cm)
- Weight: 165 lb (75 kg; 11 st 11 lb)
- Position: Defence
- Shoots: Left
- AlpsHL team Former teams: KHL Sisak; HC Vítkovice; KHL Medveščak Zagreb; Coventry Blaze; Podhale Nowy Targ
- National team: Croatia
- Playing career: 2016–present

Ivan Puzić (born 15 February 1996) is a Croatian professional ice hockey defenceman.

Puzić played ten games for HC Vítkovice of the Czech Extraliga from 2016 to 2018. He joined KHL Medveščak Zagreb of the Erste Bank Eishockey Liga on 8 June 2018, but departed by December and joined the Coventry Blaze of the Elite Ice Hockey League. On 30 January 2020, Puzić joined Podhale Nowy Targ of the Polska Hokej Liga.

Puzić is also a member of the Croatian national team and most recently played in the qualifiers for the 2022 Winter Olympics.
