= 2012 IIHF World Championship Division II =

International ice hockey tournament

Tournament details
- Host countries: Iceland; Bulgaria
- Venue(s): 2 (in 2 host cities)
- Dates: 12 – 18 April; 2 – 8 April
- Teams: 12

The 2012 IIHF World Championship Division II was an international Ice hockey tournament run by the International Ice Hockey Federation. Group A was contested in Reykjavík, Iceland from April 12–18, 2012 and Group B was contested in Sofia, Bulgaria from April 2–8, 2012.

== Participants ==
=== Group A ===
| Team | Qualification |
|---|---|
| Croatia | Placed 2nd in Division II Group B last year. |
| Estonia | Placed 6th Division I Group B and was relegated in 2011. |
| Iceland | Host, placed 3rd in Division II Group B last year. |
| New Zealand | Placed 2nd in Division II Group A last year. |
| Serbia | Placed 3rd in Division II Group A last year. |
| Spain | Placed 5th Division I Group A and was relegated in 2011. |

=== Group B ===
| Team | Qualification |
|---|---|
| Belgium | Placed 4th in Division II Group A last year. |
| Bulgaria | Host, placed 5th in Division II Group B last year. |
| China | Placed 4th in Division II Group B last year. |
| Israel | Placed 1st in Division III last year and was promoted. |
| Mexico | Placed 5th in Division II Group A last year. |
| South Africa | Placed 2nd in Division III last year and was promoted. |

== Group A Tournament ==
=== Standings ===
| Promoted to Division I B for 2013 |
| Relegated to Division II B for 2013 |

| Team | GP | W | OTW | OTL | L | GF | GA | GDF | PTS |
|---|---|---|---|---|---|---|---|---|---|
| Estonia | 5 | 5 | 0 | 0 | 0 | 39 | 11 | +28 | 15 |
| Spain | 5 | 4 | 0 | 0 | 1 | 21 | 9 | +12 | 12 |
| Croatia | 5 | 3 | 0 | 0 | 2 | 27 | 13 | +14 | 9 |
| Iceland | 5 | 2 | 0 | 0 | 3 | 12 | 19 | −7 | 6 |
| Serbia | 5 | 1 | 0 | 0 | 4 | 27 | 20 | +7 | 3 |
| New Zealand | 5 | 0 | 0 | 0 | 5 | 5 | 59 | −54 | 0 |

All times are local (UTC±0).

| 12 April 2012; 13:00 | Croatia | 2–3 (0–0, 1–1, 1–2) | Spain | Laugardalur Arena, Reykjavík; Attendance: 184 |

Game reference

Mate Tomljenović
Goalies
Ander Alcaine
Referee:
(Belgium) Chris Deweerdt
Linesmen:
(China) Cao Jian
(Netherlands) Jos Korte

| K. Macaulay (M. Sertić) (PP) – 27:02 | 1–0 |
| | 1–1 | 37:24 – C. Quevedo |
| I. Šijan (PP) – 54:04 | 2–1 |
| | 2–2 | 56:09 – P. Muñoz |
| | 2–3 | 59:57 – J. Muñoz (A. Pedraz) |

8 min
Penalties
8 min
42
Shots
26

| 12 April 2012; 16:30 | Estonia | 5–2 (1–2, 3–0, 1–0) | Serbia | Laugardalur Arena, Reykjavík; Attendance: 208 |

Game reference

Villem-Henrik Koitmaa
Goalies
Milan Luković
Referee:
(Norway) Owe Luthcke
Linesmen:
(Italy) Ulrich Pardatscher
(Iceland) Orri Sigmarsson

| R. Rooba (L. Lahesalu) (PP) – 08:27 | 1–0 |
| | 1–1 | 11:07 – M. Kovačević (B. Gabrić) (PP) |
| | 1–2 | 17:20 – N. Bibić (M. Kovačević) (PP2) |
| A. Sibirtsev (A. Petrov, K. Kuusk) – 27:43 | 2–2 |
| M. Ivanov (A. Petrov, D. Rodin) (SH) – 32:24 | 3–2 |
| V. Titarenko (A. Petrov) – 32:53 | 4–2 |
| M. Ivanov (R. Rooba, D. Rodin) (PP) – 40:31 | 5–2 |

22 min
Penalties
26 min
50
Shots
34

| 12 April 2012; 20:00 | Iceland | 4–0 (1–0, 1–0, 2–0) | New Zealand | Laugardalur Arena, Reykjavík; Attendance: 522 |

Game reference

Dennis Hedstrom
Goalies
Kane Easterbrook
Referee:
(France) Damien Bliek
Linesmen:
(Ukraine) Oleksandr Govorun
(Switzerland) Michael Tscherrig

| R. Hedstrom (Ó. Björnsson, I. Jönsson) – 12:21 | 1–0 |
| R. Hedstrom (E. Alengaard, Ó. Björnsson) – 39:10 | 2–0 |
| J. Magnusson (B. Árnason) – 41:22 | 3–0 |
| R. Hedstrom (O. Blöndal) – 59:15 | 4–0 |

10 min
Penalties
30 min
47
Shots
6

| 13 April 2012; 13:00 | Estonia | 3–2 (2–0, 0–1, 1–1) | Croatia | Laugardalur Arena, Reykjavík; Attendance: 112 |

Game reference

Villem-Henrik Koitmaa
Aleksandr Kolossov
Goalies
Mate Tomljenovic
Referee:
(Norway) Owe Luthcke
Linesmen:
(Ukraine) Oleksandr Govorun
(Italy) Ulrich Pardatscher

| R. Booba (A. Petrov, L Lahesalu) (PP) – 05:06 | 1–0 |
| A. Sibirtsev – 18:01 | 2–0 |
| | 2–1 | 30:00 – J. Prpic (K. Macaulay) (PP) |
| | 2–2 | 50:23 – I. Lazić (J. Prpic, A. Sertich) |
| R. Andrejev (S. Novikov) – 58:05 | 3–2 |

22 min
Penalties
12 min
34
Shots
40

| 13 April 2012; 16:30 | Spain | 7–0 (1–0, 4–0, 2–0) | New Zealand | Laugardalur Arena, Reykjavík; Attendance: 157 |

Game reference

Ander Alcaine
Goalies
Kane Easterbrook
Referee:
(Belgium) Chris Deweerdt
Linesmen:
(Netherlands) Jos Korte
(Switzerland) Michael Tscherrig

| A. Vea (P. Muñoz) – 09:17 | 1–0 |
| J. Gavilanes (E. Paz) – 28:53 | 2–0 |
| A. Betran (A. Gavilanes) – 29:30 | 3–0 |
| D. Perez (J. Gavilanes) – 31:46 | 4–0 |
| S. Barnola (P. Munoz, J. Brabo) – 34:46 | 5–0 |
| J. Muñoz (PP) – 42:02 | 6–0 |
| D. Coscojuela (S. Barnola) – 50:17 | 7–0 |

14 min
Penalties
10 min
57
Shots
26

| 13 April 2012; 20:00 | Serbia | 3–5 (2–2, 0–3, 1–0) | Iceland | Laugardalur Arena, Reykjavík; Attendance: 850 |

Game reference

Milan Luković
Goalies
Denis Hedstrom
Referee:
(United Kingdom) Michael Hicks
Linesmen:
(China) Cao Jian
(Denmark) Morten Thomsen

| P. Popravka (D. Filipović, P. Ogrizović) – 02:02 | 1–0 |
| N. Janković (M. Sretović) – 06:20 | 2–0 |
| | 2–1 | 08:06 – B. Árnason (E. Alengaard, I. Jönsson) |
| | 2–2 | 16:42 – P. Maack (J. Gíslason) (PP) |
| | 2–3 | 31:07 – E. Alengaard (S. Sigurbjörnsson) |
| | 2–4 | 35:13 – A. Mikaelsson (M. Sigurdarson) |
| | 2–5 | 39:52 – J. Gíslason (A. Mikaelsson) (PP) |
| N. Janković (M. Sretović, A. Luković) (PP) – 49:18 | 3–5 |

22 min
Penalties
16 min
35
Shots
24

| 15 April 2012; 13:00 | Spain | 4–2 (1–2, 1–0, 2–0) | Serbia | Laugardalur Arena, Reykjavík; Attendance: 150 |

Game reference

Ander Alcaine
Goalies
Milan Luković
Referee:
(France) Damien Bliek
Linesmen:
(Denmark) Morten Thomsen
(Switzerland) Michael Tscherrig

| A. Pedraz (O. Vazquez) (PP) – 12:45 | 1–0 |
| | 1–1 | 13:56 – M. Milovanović (M. Kovacević) |
| | 1–2 | 18:36 – B. Gabric (PP) |
| P. Puyuelo (D. Perez, P. Muñoz) (PP) – 25:19 | 2–2 |
| A. Pedraz – 54:34 | 3–2 |
| P. Muñoz (S. Barnola) (SH) – 58:56 | 4–2 |

10 min
Penalties
48 min
26
Shots
30

| 15 April 2012; 16:30 | Croatia | 12–3 (3–0, 4–1, 5–2) | New Zealand | Laugardalur Arena, Reykjavík; Attendance: 124 |

Game reference

Mate Tomljenović
Tihomir Filipeć
Goalies
Kane Easterbrook
Jaden Pine-Murphy
Referee:
(United Kingdom) Michael Hicks
Linesmen:
(Ukraine) Oleksandr Govorun
(Iceland) Orri Sigmarsson

| J. Prpic (K. Macaulay, A. Sertich) (SH) – 07:06 | 1–0 |
| K. Macaulay (J. Prpic) – 18:35 | 2–0 |
| M. Novak (J. Kucera, I. Sijan) (PP) – 19:49 | 3–0 |
| A. Sertich (J. Prpic, I. Lazić) (PP) – 22:59 | 4–0 |
| | 4–1 | 24:04 – J. Hay |
| A. Sertich (J. Prpic, C. Powers) (PP) – 27:13 | 5–1 |
| B. Rendulić (K. Macaulay, M. Blagus) – 30:39 | 6–1 |
| M. Novak (F. Orescanin, J. Kucera) – 37:13 | 7–1 |
| | 7–2 | 41:19 – J. Hay (J. Challis, B. Haines) |
| A. Sertich (I. Lazić, J. Prpic) – 43:14 | 8–2 |
| | 8–3 | 43:50 – C. Harrison (D. Harrop, M. Lee) |
| M. Blagus (B. Rendulić, M. Sertić) – 46:54 | 9–3 |
| B. Rendulić (D. Kanaet, M. Blagus) – 52:00 | 10–3 |
| I. Sijan (M. Smerdelj, K. Macaulay) – 52:19 | 11–3 |
| B. Rendulić (D. Kanaet, M. Sertić) – 56:40 | 12–3 |

26 min
Penalties
14 min
60
Shots
17

| 15 April 2012; 20:00 | Estonia | 7–2 (2–1, 3–0, 2–1) | Iceland | Laugardalur Arena, Reykjavík; Attendance: 1160 |

Game reference

Villem-Henrik Koitmaa
Goalies
Dennis Hedstrom
Referee:
(Norway) Owe Luthcke
Linesmen:
(Netherlands) Jos Korte
(Italy) Ulrich Pardatscher

| K. Kaljuste (A. Petrov) – 05:27 | 1–0 |
| | 1–1 | 12:23 – R. Hedstrom (E. Alengaard, O. Bjornsson) |
| A. Petrov (A. Sibirtsev, A. Aleksandrov) – 14:36 | 2–1 |
| V. Titarenko (R. Andrejev) – 22:27 | 3–1 |
| A. Petrov (M. Ivanov) (SH) – 25:17 | 4–1 |
| K. Kaljuste (R. Rooba, M. Ivanov) – 35:44 | 5–1 |
| A. Sibirtsev (A. Aleksandrov, A. Jakovlev) – 45:03 | 6–1 |
| | 6–2 | 48:40 – E. Alengaard (B. Sigurdarson, R. Hedsrom) |
| M. Ivanov (M. Semjonov, D. Rodin) (PP2) – 52:03 | 7–2 |

16 min
Penalties
12 min
54
Shots
26

| 17 April 2012; 13:00 | New Zealand | 2–19 (0–8, 2–6, 0–5) | Estonia | Laugardalur Arena, Reykjavík; Attendance: 95 |

Game reference

Jaden Pine-Murphy
Kane Easterbrook
Goalies
Aleksandr Kolossov
Referee:
(Belgium) Chris Deweerdt
Linesmen:
(China) Cao Jian
(Iceland) Orri Sigmarsson

| | 0–1 | 04:48 – R. Andrejev (M. Vorang) |
| | 0–2 | 05:12 – K. Kaljuste (V. Titarenko) |
| | 0–3 | 05:43 – S. Ivanov (K. Kuusk, J. Lukats) |
| | 0–4 | 14:12 – M. Semjonov (R. Rooba, D. Rodin) |
| | 0–5 | 15:21 – S. Novikov (K. Kaljuste) |
| | 0–6 | 16:59 – S. Ivanov (K. Kuusk) |
| | 0–7 | 18:59 – V. Titarenko (K. Kaljust, A. Petrov) (PP) |
| | 0–8 | 19:39 – M. Vorang (R. Andrejev) |
| | 0–9 | 22:16 – K. Kaljuste (A. Sibirtsev) |
| | 0–10 | 27:32 – M. Semjonov (R. Rooba, M. Vorang) (PP) |
| A. Cox (I. Wannamker) – 31:37 | 1–10 |
| | 1–11 | 32:56 – A. Sibirtsev (I. Urushev, V. Titarenko) (PP) |
| | 1–12 | 34:22 – M. Vorang (A. Jakovlev) |
| | 1–13 | 34:39 – A. Petrov |
| A. Cox (I. Wannamker) (PP) – 34:56 | 2–13 |
| | 2–14 | 38:27 – I. Savvov |
| | 2–15 | 41:01 – R. Rooba (M. Ivanov, D. Rodin) (PP) |
| | 2–16 | 48:00 – A. Petrov (V. Titarenko) |
| | 2–17 | 51:23 – A. Sibirtsev (PS) |
| | 2–18 | 58:42 – D. Rodin (R. Andrejev, R. Rooba) |
| | 2–19 | 59:26 – A. Petrov(A. Sibirtsev) (PP) |

18 min
Penalties
4 min
22
Shots
89

| 17 April 2012; 16:30 | Serbia | 3–6 (1–2, 0–2, 2–2) | Croatia | Laugardalur Arena, Reykjavík; Attendance: 134 |

Game reference

Milan Luković
Goalies
Mate Tomljenović
Tihomir Filipeć
Referee:
(France) Damien Bliek
Linesmen:
(Italy) Ulrich Pardatscher
(Switzerland) Michael Tscherrig

| | 0–1 | 03:07 – J. Prpic (A. Sertich) |
| | 0–2 | 05:09 – F. Orescanin (T. Miric, N. Grahovar) |
| M. Babić (N. Janković) – 12:40 | 1–2 |
| | 1–3 | 25:24 – A. Sertich (I. Lazić, J. Prpic) |
| | 1–4 | 39:03 – I. Lazić |
| N. Vučurević (M. Milovanović) – 41:09 | 2–4 |
| | 2–5 | 50:06 – C. Powers (PP) |
| | 2–6 | 54:57 – A. Sertich (J. Prpic) (PP) |
| R. Sabados (S. Ristić) – 56:35 | 3–6 |

18 min
Penalties
10 min
37
Shots
43

| 17 April 2012; 20:00 | Iceland | 0–4 (0–2, 0–1, 0–1) | Spain | Laugardalur Arena, Reykjavík; Attendance: 650 |

Game reference

Dennis Hedstrom
Goalies
Ander Alcaine
Referee:
(United Kingdom) Michael Hicks
Linesmen:
(Ukraine) Oleksandr Govorun
(Denmark) Morten Thomsen

| 0–1 | 05:02 – A. Pedraz |
| 0–2 | 13:44 – J. Brabo (P. Muñoz, J. Gavilanes) |
| 0–3 | 29:45 – P. Muñoz (S. Barnola, C. Quevedo) (PP) |
| 0–4 | 53:08 – G. Betran (P. Muñoz, S. Barnola) (PP) |

20 min
Penalties
16 min
24
Shots
27

| 18 April 2012; 13:00 | New Zealand | 0–17 (0–7, 0–6, 0–4) | Serbia | Laugardalur Arena, Reykjavík; Attendance: 234 |

Game reference

Kane Easterbrook
Jaden Pine-Murphy
Goalies
Milan Luković
Jovan Feher
Referee:
(Norway) Owe Luthcke
Linesmen:
(Netherlands) Jos Korte
(Iceland) Orri Sigmarsson

| 0–1 | 05:16 – S. Ilić (M. Kovacević) (PP) |
| 0–2 | 10:00 – N. Raković (M. Sretović) (SH) |
| 0–3 | 12:05 – N. Janković (N. Bibić) |
| 0–4 | 13:37 – M. Milovanović (B. Gabrić) (SH) |
| 0–5 | 16:03 – M. Kovacević (M. Milovanović) |
| 0–6 | 16:29 – M. Sretović (N. Raković) (PP) |
| 0–7 | 18:35 – S. Ilić (M. Milovanović) |
| 0–8 | 22:16 – D. Filipović (P. Popravka) |
| 0–9 | 24:26 – N. Janković (M. Kovacević) |
| 0–10 | 25:39 – D. Filipović (P. Ogrizović) |
| 0–11 | 27:30 – N. Janković (M. Sretović) |
| 0–12 | 36:00 – M. Babić (S. Ristić, N. Raković) (PP) |
| 0–13 | 39:15 – B. Gabrić (SH) |
| 0–14 | 40:21 – B. Gabrić (M. Milovanović, S. Ilić) |
| 0–15 | 41:51 – M. Sretović (P. Popravka) |
| 0–16 | 43:53 – D. Filipović (R. Sabados) |
| 0–17 | 52:38 – M. Kovacević (N. Bibić, A. Luković) |

18 min
Penalties
8 min
19
Shots
74

| 18 April 2012; 16:30 | Spain | 3–5 (1–2, 2–2, 0–1) | Estonia | Laugardalur Arena, Reykjavík; Attendance: 278 |

Game reference

Ander Alcaine
Goalies
Villem-Henrik Koitmaa
Referee:
(United Kingdom) Michael Hicks
Linesmen:
(Ukraine) Oleksandr Govorun
(Denmark) Morten Thomsen

| | 0–1 | 07:54 – K. Kuusk (A. Petrov) (SH) |
| C. Quevedo (P. Gonzalez, G. Betran) (PP) – 08:55 | 1–1 |
| | 1–2 | 09:51 – D. Rodin (M. Ivanov) |
| | 1–3 | 21:55 – L. Lahesalu (M. Semjonov) (PP) |
| | 1–4 | 23:55 – M. Semjonov (M. Ivanov, D. Rodin) (PP) |
| P. Gonzalez (P. Puyuelo) – 26:37 | 2–4 |
| P. Puyuelo (A. Hernandez) – 37:25 | 3–4 |
| | 3–5 | 46:39 – M. Ivanov (L. Lahesalu, M. Semjonov) |

18 min
Penalties
10 min
24
Shots
64

| 18 April 2012; 20:00 | Croatia | 5–1 (1–0, 1–0, 3–1) | Iceland | Laugardalur Arena, Reykjavík; Attendance: 850 |

Game reference

Mate Tomljenović
Goalies
Dennis Hedstrom
Referee:
(France) Damien Bliek
Linesmen:
(China) Cao Jian
(Italy) Ulrich Pardatscher

| A. Sertich (I. Lazić, J. Prpic) – 10:08 | 1–0 |
| K. Macaulay (A. Sertich, J. Prpic) (PP) – 27:20 | 2–0 |
| I. Lazić (J. Prpic, A. Sertich) – 45:48 | 3–0 |
| B. Rendulić (M. Tadić) – 55:32 | 4–0 |
| | 4–1 | 56:06 – M. Sigurdarson |
| M. Blagus (D. Kanaet) (ENG) – 57:50 | 5–1 |

6 min
Penalties
10 min
63
Shots
22

=== Statistics ===
==== Top 10 scorers ====
| Pos | Player | Country | GP | G | A | Pts | +/− | PIM |
|---|---|---|---|---|---|---|---|---|
| 1 | Joel Prpic | Croatia | 5 | 3 | 10 | 13 | +6 | 2 |
| 2 | Andrew Sertich | Croatia | 5 | 7 | 5 | 12 | +8 | 0 |
| 3 | Aleksandr Petrov | Estonia | 5 | 5 | 7 | 12 | +8 | 0 |
| 4 | Maksim Ivanov | Estonia | 5 | 4 | 5 | 9 | +6 | 12 |
| 5 | Aleksei Sibirtsev | Estonia | 5 | 5 | 3 | 8 | +6 | 0 |
| 6 | Pablo Muñoz | Spain | 5 | 3 | 5 | 8 | +5 | 6 |
| 6 | Robert Rooba | Estonia | 5 | 3 | 5 | 8 | +5 | 6 |
| 8 | Dmitri Rodin | Estonia | 5 | 2 | 6 | 8 | +5 | 10 |
| 9 | Marko Kovacevic | Serbia | 5 | 3 | 4 | 7 | +2 | 2 |
| 9 | Igor Lazic | Croatia | 5 | 3 | 4 | 7 | +4 | 2 |
| 9 | Kenny MacAulay | Croatia | 5 | 3 | 4 | 7 | +2 | 0 |

IIHF.com

==== Goaltending leaders ====
(minimum 40% team's total ice time)

| Pos | Player | Country | MINS | GA | Sv% | GAA | SO |
|---|---|---|---|---|---|---|---|
| 1 | Ander Alcaine | Spain | 290:17 | 9 | 95.16 | 1.86 | 1 |
| 2 | Villem-Henrik Koitmaa | Estonia | 235:56 | 9 | 92.56 | 2.29 | 0 |
| 3 | Mate Tomljenovic | Croatia | 279:04 | 11 | 91.54 | 2.37 | 0 |
| 4 | Dennis Henstrom | Iceland | 299:50 | 18 | 90.22 | 3.60 | 1 |
| 5 | Milan Lukovic | Serbia | 289:39 | 20 | 87.34 | 4.14 | 0 |

IIHF.com

=== Tournament awards ===
- Best players selected by the directorate:
  - Best Goaltender: (Spain) Ander Alcaine
  - Best Defenceman: (Croatia) Kenny MacAulay

IIHF.com

== Group B Tournament ==
=== Standings ===
| Promoted to Division II A for 2013 |
| Relegated to Division III for 2013 |

| Team | GP | W | OTW | OTL | L | GF | GA | GDF | PTS |
|---|---|---|---|---|---|---|---|---|---|
| Belgium | 5 | 5 | 0 | 0 | 0 | 49 | 11 | +38 | 15 |
| China | 5 | 3 | 0 | 0 | 2 | 28 | 21 | +7 | 9 |
| Bulgaria | 5 | 2 | 1 | 0 | 2 | 21 | 28 | −7 | 8 |
| Mexico | 5 | 2 | 0 | 1 | 2 | 17 | 24 | −7 | 7 |
| Israel | 5 | 1 | 1 | 1 | 2 | 19 | 22 | −3 | 6 |
| South Africa | 5 | 0 | 0 | 0 | 5 | 4 | 32 | −28 | 0 |

All times are local (UTC+3).

| 2 April 2012; 12:00 | Mexico | 2–9 (0–5, 1–1, 1–3) | Belgium | Winter Sports Palace, Sofia; Attendance: 65 |

Game reference

Alfonso de Alba
Goalies
Bjorn Steijlen
Referee:
(Belarus) Vladimir Proskurov
Linesmen:
(Serbia) David Perduv
(Austria) Florian Widmann

| | 0–1 | 02:56 – V. Morgan (M. Morgan, N. de Herdt) |
| | 0–2 | 04:25 – O. Roland (V. Morgan) |
| | 0–3 | 06:04 – D. Leirs (D. Geerts, B. Vercammen) |
| | 0–4 | 19:35 – V. Morgan (M. Morgan, N. de Herdt) |
| | 0–5 | 19:57 – O. Roland (V. Morgan, M. Morgan) |
| J. Ramirez – 22:38 | 1–5 |
| | 1–6 | 26:11 – J. Engelen (N. Vroemans) |
| | 1–7 | 40:19 – O. Roland (V. Morgan, N. de Herdt) |
| | 1–8 | 43:51 – M. Morgan (O. Roland) |
| C. Gomez (Al. Cervantes, Ad. Cervantes) (PP) – 47:14 | 2–8 |
| | 2–9 | 56:24 – O. Roland (M. Morgan) |

2 min
Penalties
10 min
30
Shots
47

| 2 April 2012; 15:30 | China | 9–5 (3–2, 2–1, 4–2) | Israel | Winter Sports Palace, Sofia; Attendance: 152 |

Game reference

Xie Ming
Liu Xiewei
Goalies
Boris Amromin
Jevgeni Gusin
Referee:
(Spain) Alexie Roshchyn
Linesmen:
(Bulgaria) Mikulash Furnadziev
(Spain) Rudy Meyer

| | 0–1 | 00:56 – D. Mazour (E. Sherbatov) |
| | 0–2 | 03:07 – E. Sherbatov (T. Avneri) |
| He Y. (Liu L., Zhang W.) – 12:09 | 1–2 |
| Chen L. (Wang C., Liu L.) (PP2) – 18:21 | 2–2 |
| Qu Y. (Zhang W.) – 19:38 | 3–2 |
| | 3–3 | 26:13 – E. Sherbatov (S. Frenkel) |
| Chen L. (Liu L.) (SH) – 28:15 | 4–3 |
| Wang C. (Chen L., Fu N.) – 30:14 | 5–3 |
| Wang C. (Chen L.) – 40:08 | 6–3 |
| Zhang W. (Hu T.) – 49:10 | 7–3 |
| | 7–4 | 51:10 – E. Sherbatov (SH) |
| Guo D. (Zhang H., Li J.) (PP) – 59:02 | 8–4 |
| Chen Z. (Liu W.) – 59:17 | 9–4 |
| | 9–5 | 59:59 – E. Sherbatov |

16 min
Penalties
14 min
46
Shots
21

| 2 April 2012; 19:00 | South Africa | 1–4 (0–1, 1–1, 1–2) | Bulgaria | Winter Sports Palace, Sofia; Attendance: 1,235 |

Game reference

Gary Bock
Goalies
Konstantin Mihailov
Referee:
(Italy) Michele Gastaldelli
Linesmen:
(Hungary) Attila Nagy
(Russia) Evgeniy Plaksunov

| | 0–1 | 15:57 – G. Iskrenov (M. Nikolov, M. Milanov) |
| | 0–2 | 21:02 – S. Muhachev (A. Yotov, C. Cvetanov) |
| G. Lyon (J. Reinecke) – 27:43 | 1–2 |
| | 1–3 | 49:21 – P. Hadzhitonev |
| | 1–4 | 54:12 – A. Yotov (S. Muhachev, R. Morgunov) |

45 min
Penalties
10 min
38
Shots
31

| 3 April 2012; 12:00 | China | 5–1 (3–0, 1–1, 1–0) | Mexico | Winter Sports Palace, Sofia; Attendance: 35 |

Game reference

Xie Ming
Goalies
Andres de la Garma
Referee:
(Netherlands) Jean Paul De Brabander
Linesmen:
(Bulgaria) Mikulash Funnadziev
(Bulgaria) Todor Krastev

| He Y. (Qu Y.) – 04:31 | 1–0 |
| Zhang W. (Zhang H.) (SH) – 10:26 | 2–0 |
| Zhang W. (Wang D.) – 17:34 | 3–0 |
| He Y. (Wang D.) – 27:46 | 4–0 |
| | 4–1 | 33:27 – Al. Cervantes (R. Chabat, Ad. Cervantes) (PP) |
| Qu Y. (Zhang W.) (SH) – 40:14 | 5–1 |

32 min
Penalties
10 min
47
Shots
22

| 3 April 2012; 15:30 | Israel | 6–2 (3–0, 2–0, 1–2) | South Africa | Winter Sports Palace, Sofia; Attendance: 47 |

Game reference

Jevgeni Gusin
Goalies
Gary Bock
Jack Nebe
Referee:
(Spain) Alexei Roshchyn
Linesmen:
(Hungary) Attila Nagy
(Kazakhstan) Evgeniy Plaksunov

| E. Sherbatov (PP) – 09:17 | 1–0 |
| A. Geller (R. Soreanu) – 10:00 | 2–0 |
| A. Korotin (PP) – 13:31 | 3–0 |
| D. Mazour (S. Frenkel, E. Sherbatov) (PP) – 21:03 | 4–0 |
| E. Sherbatov (D. Mazour, D. Spivak) – 30:50 | 5–0 |
| | 5–1 | 42:50 – J. Reinecke (D. Magmoed) (PP) |
| | 5–2 | 50:58 – A. Marais (J. Reinecke, M. Cornforth) |
| E. Sherbatov (S. Frenkel, D. Mazour) – 54:05 | 6–2 |

18 min
Penalties
10 min
47
Shots
11

| 3 April 2012; 19:00 | Belgium | 14–3 (2–0, 6–0, 6–3) | Bulgaria | Winter Sports Palace, Sofia; Attendance: 1,380 |

Game reference

Bjorn Steijlen
Kevin van Looveren
Goalies
Konstantin Mihailov
Teodor Asenov
Referee:
(Belarus) Vladimir Proskurov
Linesmen:
(Spain) Rudy Meyer
(Serbia) David Perduv

| V. Morgan (M. Morgan, O. Roland) (PP) – 09:15 | 1–0 |
| M. Morgan – 10:35 | 2–0 |
| V. Morgan (O. Roland, M. Morgan) – 23:03 | 3–0 |
| L. Maas (B. Kolodziejczyk, K. van Looy) – 23:45 | 4–0 |
| K. van Looy (J. Raekelboom – 25:50 | 5–0 |
| O. Roland (V. Morgan) (PP) – 26:56 | 6–0 |
| M. Morgan (V. Morgan, O. Roland) – 34:52 | 7–0 |
| D. Thurura (J. Raekelboom, J. Paulus) – 36:58 | 8–0 |
| | 8–1 | 40:39 – C. Cvetanov (M. Boyadjiev) (PP) |
| M. Morgan (D. Leirs, O. Roland) – 41:45 | 9–1 |
| | 9–2 | 47:17 – Y. Slavchev (K. Chapkanov) |
| D. Thurura (T. Dewin, D. Leirs) – 48:52 | 10–2 |
| M. Morgan (O. Roland, V. Morgan) – 49:30 | 11–2 |
| T. Dewin (B. Kolodziejczyk) – 51:50 | 12–2 |
| J. Paulus (K. van Looy, B. Kolodziejczyk) – 54:49 | 13–2 |
| B. Vercammen (PS) – 56:29 | 14–2 |
| | 14–3 | 57:00 – G. Iskrenov (M. Boyadjiev, M. Nikolov) |

8 min
Penalties
8 min
95
Shots
29

| 5 April 2012; 12:00 | Belgium | 4–1 (1–1, 2–0, 1–0) | Israel | Winter Sports Palace, Sofia; Attendance: 38 |

Game reference

Bjorn Steijlen
Goalies
Jevgeni Gusin
Referee:
(Belarus) Vladimir Proskurov
Linesmen:
(Hungary) Attila Nagy
(Austria) Florian Widmann

| O. Roland (J. Engelen M. Morgan) (PP) – 10:06 | 1–0 |
| | 1–1 | 16:21 – D. Mazour (E. Sherbatov, S. Frenkel) |
| B. Vercammen (J. Raekelboom, K. van Looy) – 25:56 | 2–1 |
| J. Engelen (N. de Herdt) (PP) – 35:51 | 3–1 |
| K. van Looy (B. Vercammen, J. Raekelboom) – 40:58 | 4–1 |

10 min
Penalties
46 min
47
Shots
19

| 5 April 2012; 15:30 | China | 6–1 (2–0, 4–0, 0–1) | South Africa | Winter Sports Palace, Sofia; Attendance: 62 |

Game reference

Xie Ming
Liu Xiewei
Goalies
Jack Nebe
Referee:
(Netherlands) Jean Paul De Brabander
Linesmen:
(Bulgaria) Todor Krastev
(Serbia) David Perduv

| Fu T. (Fu N.) (PP) – 01:10 | 1–0 |
| Yang MingxiYang M. (Guo D.) – 18:05 | 2–0 |
| Zhang W. – 28:17 | 3–0 |
| Fu T. (Chen L., Fu N.) (PP) – 32:50 | 4–0 |
| Hu T. (PP) – 37:41 | 5–0 |
| Chen L. (Liu L., Fu N.) (PP) – 39:22 | 6–0 |
| | 6–1 | 42:00 – J. Reinecke |

20 min
Penalties
28 min
56
Shots
21

| 5 April 2012; 19:00 | Mexico | 8–5 (5–0, 1–4, 2–1) | Bulgaria | Winter Sports Palace, Sofia; Attendance: 1,358 |

Game reference

Andres de la Garma
Goalies
Teodor Asenov
Nikolai Nikolov
Referee:
(Italy) Michele Gastaldelli
Linesmen:
(Spain) Rudy Meyer
(Kazakhstan) Evgeniy Plaksunov

| Ad. Cervantes (Al. Cervantes, A. Barberena) – 11:06 | 1–0 |
| B. Arroyo (F. Ugarte, J. Ramirez) (PP) – 14:26 | 2–0 |
| B. Arroyo (Alexander Gutierrez, J. Ramirez) (PP2) – 15:59 | 3–0 |
| F. Ugarte (Roberto Chabat, Al. Cervantes) (PP) – 16:25 | 4–0 |
| R. Chabat (Ad. Cervantes, Al. Cervantes) (PP) – 19:17 | 5–0 |
| | 5–1 | 20:27 – A. Yotov (S. Muhachev) |
| | 5–2 | 24:16 – S. Muhachev (C. Cvetanov, M. Giurov) (PP) |
| | 5–3 | 31:30 – A. Yotov (S. Muhachev) |
| C. Kelo (A. Gutierrez) – 32:20 | 6–3 |
| | 6–4 | 39:00 – S. Muhachev (V. Vasilev) (PP) |
| | 6–5 | 44:36 – M. Boyadjiev (S. Muhachev, V. Vasiliy) (PP) |
| F. Ugarte (Ad. Cervantes) (PP) – 45:51 | 7–5 |
| C. Kelo (SH, ENG) – 59:23 | 8–5 |

14 min
Penalties
45 min
33
Shots
45

| 6 April 2012; 12:00 | South Africa | 0–14 (0–2, 0–6, 0–6) | Belgium | Winter Sports Palace, Sofia; Attendance: 65 |

Game reference

Jack Nebe
Gary Bock
Goalies
Bjorn Steijlen
Kevin van Looveren
Referee:
(Netherlands) Jean Paul De Brabander
Linesmen:
(Bulgaria) Mikulash Furnadziev
(Spain) Rudy Meyer

| 0–1 | 03:02 – V. Morgan (M. Morgan, N. de Herdt) |
| 0–2 | 03:13 – J. Raekelboom (K. van Looy, J. Paulus) |
| 0–3 | 24:38 – B. Vercammen (K. van Looy, J. Engelen) |
| 0–4 | 25:51 – N. de Herdt (M. Morgan, J. Engelen) (PP) |
| 0–5 | 29:18 – B. Kolodziejczyk (O. Roland) (SH) |
| 0–6 | 33:41 – O. Roland |
| 0–7 | 37:32 – V. Morgan (M. Morgan, O. Roland) |
| 0–8 | 38:07 – D. Geerts (B. Kolodziejczyk, B. Torremans) |
| 0–9 | 42:24 – V. Morgan (O. Roland) |
| 0–10 | 46:32 – J. Engelen (M. Morgan, V. Morgan) (PP) |
| 0–11 | 49:18 – J. Vercammen (D. Leirs, T. Dewin) |
| 0–12 | 49:53 – V. Morgan (T. Dewin, J. Paulus) |
| 0–13 | 50:45 – K. van Looy (B. Vercammen) (PP) |
| 0–14 | 55:27 – D. Geerts (B. Kolodziejczyk, L. Maas) (PP) |

8 min
Penalties
10 min
10
Shots
29

| 6 April 2012; 15:30 | Israel | 5–4 OT (1–2, 2–1, 1–1) (OT: 1–0) | Mexico | Winter Sports Palace, Sofia; Attendance: 235 |

Game reference

Jevgeni Gusin
Goalies
Alfonso de Alba
Referee:
(Italy) Michele Gastaldelli
Linesmen:
(Bulgaria) Todor Krastev
(Serbia) David Perduv

| D. Mazour (D. Spivak) (PP) – 10:16 | 1–0 |
| | 1–1 | 14:58 – J. Ramirez (A. Gutierrez) |
| | 1–2 | 17:36 – Ad. Cervantes (L.D. Gonzalez) |
| S. Frenkel (D. Mazour) – 32:11 | 2–2 |
| E. Sherbatov (D. Mazour) (SH) – 37:57 | 3–2 |
| | 3–3 | 38:46 – A. Gutierrez (Ad. Cervantes) (PP) |
| | 3–4 | 49:18 – R. Chabat (A. Gutierrez) |
| D. Mazour – 57:20 | 4–4 |
| E. Sherbatov (S. Frenkel, D. Spivak) (PP) – 61:16 | 5–4 |

16 min
Penalties
10 min
40
Shots
22

| 6 April 2012; 19:00 | Bulgaria | 6–3 (0–1, 3–2, 3–0) | China | Winter Sports Palace, Sofia; Attendance: 1,572 |

Game reference

Nikola Nikolov
Goalies
Xie Ming
Referee:
(Spain) Alexie Roshchyn
Linesmen:
(Hungary) Attila Nagy
(Austria) Florian Widmann

| | 0–1 | 14:21 – Li J. (PP) |
| | 0–2 | 21:21 – Liu L. (Fu N., Wang C.) |
| A. Yotov (S. Muhachev) – 23:13 | 1–2 |
| G. Isrenkov (A. Yotov, R. Morgunov) (PP) – 27:49 | 2–2 |
| | 2–3 | 33:00 – Wang C. (Fu N., Chen L.) |
| A. Yotov (G. Isrenkov, S. Muhachev) (PP) – 38:36 | 3–3 |
| R. Morgunov (S. Muhachev) (PP) – 47:52 | 4–3 |
| R. Asenov (S. Muhachev, A. Yotov) (PP) – 49:32 | 5–3 |
| S. Muhachev (A. Yotov, R. Morgunov) (PP) – 52:43 | 6–3 |

14 min
Penalties
26 min
45
Shots
26

| 8 April 2012; 12:00 | Mexico | 2–0 (0–0, 2–0, 0–0) | South Africa | Winter Sports Palace, Sofia; Attendance: 103 |

Game reference
| Alfonso de Alba; Andres de la Garma | Goalies | Jack Nebe | Referee: (Belarus) Vladimir Proskurov; Linesmen: (Bulgaria) Mikulash Furnadziev (Bulgaria) Todor Krastev |
| C. Kelo (M. Colas) – 20:54 / 1–0; R. Chabat (B. Arroyo) (PP) – 31:11 / 2–0 | | | Referee: (Belarus) Vladimir Proskurov; Linesmen: (Bulgaria) Mikulash Furnadziev (Bulgaria) Todor Krastev |
| 6 min | Penalties | 14 min | Referee: (Belarus) Vladimir Proskurov; Linesmen: (Bulgaria) Mikulash Furnadziev (Bulgaria) Todor Krastev |
| 32 | Shots | 26 | Referee: (Belarus) Vladimir Proskurov; Linesmen: (Bulgaria) Mikulash Furnadziev (Bulgaria) Todor Krastev |

| 8 April 2012; 15:30 | Bulgaria | 3–2 GWS (1–1, 1–0, 0–1) (OT: 0–0) (SO: 1–0) | Israel | Winter Sports Palace, Sofia; Attendance: 1,526 |

Game reference

Nikola Nikolov
Goalies
Jevgeni Gusin
Referee:
(Italy) Michele Gastaldelli
Linesmen:
(Spain) Rudy Meyer
(Serbia) David Perduv

| C. Cvetanov (S. Muhachev) – 04:52 | 1–0 |
| | 1–1 | 12:29 – R. Oz (E. Sherbatov, S. Frenkel) |
| R. Morgunov (A. Yotov, S. Muhachev) – 34:22 | 2–1 |
| | 2–2 | 46:36 – D. Mazour (S. Frenkel, E. Sherbatov) |

M. Martinov (miss)
A. Yotov (miss)
S. Muhachev (miss)
S. Iskrenov
Shootout
(miss) D. Mazour
(miss) R. Oz
(miss) S. Frenkel
(miss) E. Sherbatov
10 min
Penalties
16 min
36
Shots
43

| 8 April 2012; 19:00 | Belgium | 8–5 (5–2, 2–0. 1–3) | China | Winter Sports Palace, Sofia; Attendance: 537 |

Game reference

Bjorn Steijlen
Goalies
Xie Ming
Liu Zhiwei
Referee:
(Spain) Alexei Roshchyn
Linesmen:
(Hungary) Attila Nagy
(Austria) Florian Widmann

| O. Roland (V. Morgan, M. Morgan) – 02:25 | 1–0 |
| B. Vercammen (L. Maas, J. Raekelboom) – 03:14 | 2–0 |
| M. Morgan (N. de Herdt) – 04:59 | 3–0 |
| V. Morgan (M. Morgan, O. Roland) (PP) – 06:37 | 4–0 |
| | 4–1 | 06:52 – Yang M. (Wang C., Liu L.) (PP) |
| | 4–2 | 10:31 – Qu Y. (Zhang H., Wang D.) |
| O. Roland (B. Torremans, M. Morgan) – 12:22 | 5–2 |
| O. Roland (N. de Herdt) – 31:07 | 6–2 |
| L. Maas (O. Roland) – 39:51 | 7–2 |
| | 7–3 | 42:43 – Zhang H. (Zhang W.) (PP) |
| | 7–4 | 44:00 – Zhang W. (Li J.) (PP) |
| | 7–5 | 44:59 – Fu N. (SH) |
| V. Morgan (M. Morgan, O. Roland) – 56:55 | 8–5 |

22 min
Penalties
18 min
26
Shots
38

=== Statistics ===
==== Top 10 scorers ====
| Pos | Player | Country | GP | G | A | Pts | +/− | PIM |
|---|---|---|---|---|---|---|---|---|
| 1 | Olivier Roland | Belgium | 5 | 10 | 12 | 22 | +22 | 4 |
| 2 | Mitch Morgan | Belgium | 5 | 6 | 15 | 21 | +20 | 2 |
| 3 | Vincent Morgan | Belgium | 5 | 10 | 8 | 18 | +21 | 0 |
| 4 | Eliezer Sherbatov | Israel | 5 | 9 | 5 | 14 | +6 | 0 |
| 5 | Stanislav Muhachev | Bulgaria | 5 | 4 | 10 | 14 | −1 | 0 |
| 6 | Daniel Mazour | Israel | 5 | 6 | 4 | 10 | +4 | 14 |
| 7 | Alexei Yotov | Bulgaria | 5 | 5 | 5 | 10 | −1 | 2 |
| 8 | Zhang Weiyang | China | 5 | 5 | 4 | 9 | +4 | 4 |
| 9 | Sergei Frenkel | Israel | 5 | 1 | 8 | 9 | +5 | 8 |
| 10 | Kristof van Looy | Belgium | 5 | 3 | 5 | 8 | +9 | 4 |

IIHF.com

==== Goaltending leaders ====
(minimum 40% team's total ice time)

| Pos | Player | Country | MINS | GA | Sv% | GAA | SO |
|---|---|---|---|---|---|---|---|
| 1 | Bjorn Steijen | Belgium | 260:00 | 8 | 93.55 | 1.85 | 0 |
| 2 | Nikola Nikolov | Bulgaria | 167:19 | 8 | 91.30 | 2.87 | 0 |
| 3 | Andreas de la Garma | Mexico | 149:48 | 10 | 90.20 | 4.01 | 0 |
| 4 | Jevgeni Gusin | Israel | 257:06 | 15 | 88.10 | 3.50 | 0 |
| 5 | Jack Nebe | South Africa | 180:17 | 15 | 87.60 | 4.99 | 0 |

IIHF.com

=== Tournament awards ===
- Best players selected by the directorate:
  - Best Goaltender: (Belgium) Bjorn Steijlen
  - Best Defenceman: (Belgium) Niki de Herdt
  - Best Forward: (Bulgaria) Stanislav Muhachev

IIHF.com
