= Dvorana Velesajam =

Ice arena in Zagreb, Croatia

Coordinates: 45°46′58″N 15°56′40″E

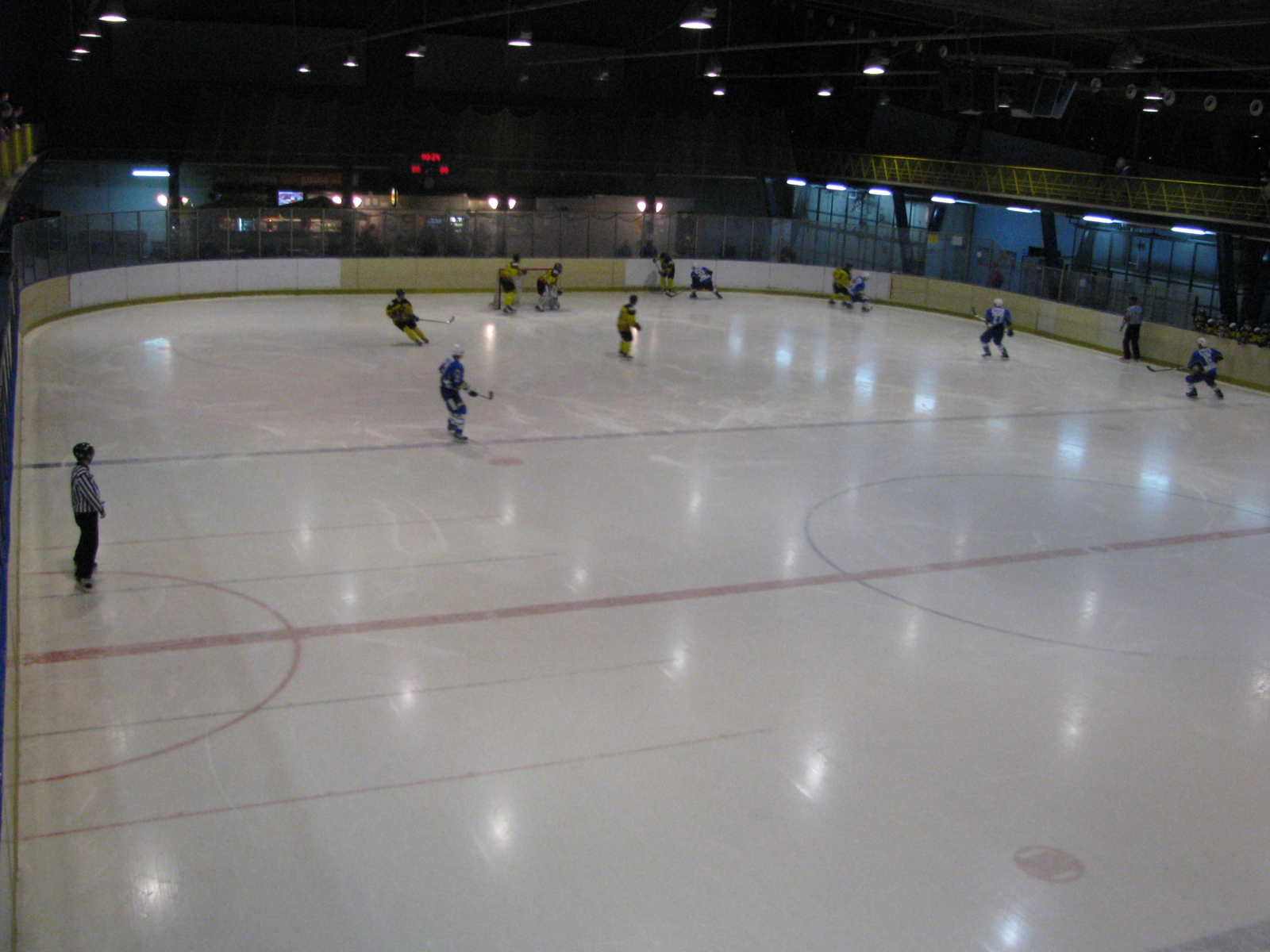
- Interactive map of Dvorana Velesajam
- Location: Zagreb, Croatia
- Capacity: 500
- Surface: Ice
- Scoreboard: Yes

Construction
- Opened: 1979

Tenants
- KHL Medveščak Mladi, KHL Medveščak II (sometimes); KHL Mladost; KHL Zagreb

Dvorana Velesajam is an ice arena located in Zagreb, Croatia. The capacity of the arena is 500 and it is located at Ulica Jozefa Antala BB, in Novi Zagreb.

Throughout the weekdays the arena is mainly used by those training ice hockey and skating. On some weekends the arena is also available to the public for recreational skating.

== See also ==
- Dom Sportova
