= KHL Medveščak Zagreb II =

Croatian ice hockey team

- City: Zagreb, Croatia
- League: Panonian League; 2003–04; Croatian Junior Ice Hockey League present Slohokej League; 2009–10
- Founded: 2003; 22 years ago
- Home arena: Admiral Ice Dome; Dvorana Velesajam (capacity: 500)
- Colours
- Affiliate: KHL Medveščak

Franchise history
- KHL Medveščak II

KHL Medveščak Zagreb II, also known as KHL Medveščak Mladi / KHL Medveščak Juniors, is a Croatian ice hockey farm team of KHL Medveščak Zagreb. They play in the Croatian Junior Ice Hockey League. Before they were senior champions in 2010, 2013, and 2014. They have also played in both the Panonian League and the Slohokej League.

== History ==
Medveščak Zagreb II played in the 2003–04 Panonian League. At the end of the regular season they finished sixth out six teams and they failed to qualify for the play-offs. They made their debut in the Croatian Ice Hockey League in 2004–05, helping to make up the numbers in a depleted four-team league. During the 2009–10 season they played in both the Slohokej Liga and the CIHL, winning the latter title.

When the senior Medveščak team left the Croatian Ice Hockey League permanently to play initially in the Austrian Hockey League and later the KHL, their place in the CIHL was effectively filled by Medveščak II. The farm team has since won a further two national league titles. They won the 2013–14 title with the help of reinforcements from their senior team after they had been eliminated early from the 2014 Gagarin Cup playoffs.

== Honours ==
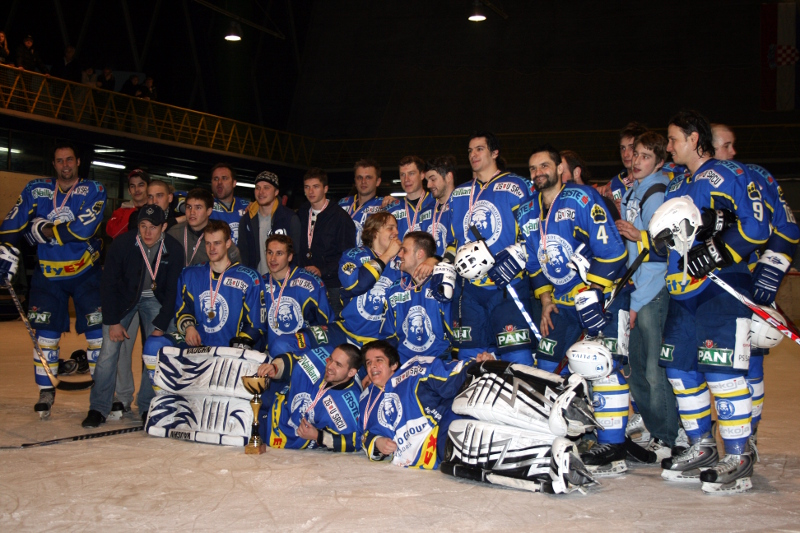
KHL Medveščak II - champions in the 2009–10 Croatian Ice Hockey League season

- Croatian Ice Hockey League: 3
  - 2010, 2013, 2014
