= KHL Sisak =

- Nickname: The Knights
- City: Sisak, Croatia
- League: Croatian Ice Hockey League 1992–present Alps Hockey League 2024–present International Hockey League 2021–2024; Yugoslav Hockey League 1938–1991
- Founded: 1930
- Home arena: Ledena dvorana Zibel (capacity: 1,960)
- Colours
- President: Marko Kajgana
- Head coach: Josh Siembida
- Captain: Ivan Puzić
- Website: www.khl-sisak.hr

Franchise history
- 1930–1934: KHL Sisak
- 1934–1938: ŠK Slavija
- 1938–1942: HAŠK
- 1946–1952: FD Naprijed
- 1952–1965: SD Segesta
- 1965–1972: KKHLK Segesta
- 1972–2008: HK INA
- 2008–2010: HK Sisak
- 2010–present: Klub hokeja na ledu Sisak

KHL Sisak (Croatian: Klub hokeja na ledu Sisak) is a Croatian professional ice hockey team that plays in the Croatian Ice Hockey League and the Alps Hockey League. They play their home games at Ledena dvorana Zibel, which was renovated in 2018.

== History ==
The first hockey game was played in Sisak in 1930. It was played between the students of the 7th High School. Over the years they played partial and irregular matches, mostly between students. Then, the sports society "Slavia" organized a hockey club. The new Sisak club had its first success at the championship of Yugoslavia in 1937. The players were: Vjenceslav Holubek, Vladimir Berghauer, Želimir Golder, Josip Kovačić, Mate Starčević, Oliver Pötzl, Franjo Knebl, Branko Herlinger and Joža Stampf. At that time, Pötzl and Berghauer were members of the national team. In season 1938/39 the club participated in the Yugoslav League Croatian division, with teams from Zagreb, Karlovac, and Varaždin. In 1958 and 1959 Sisak hockey players won the Croatian championship and became members of the Federal League. In 1961 they went on to become Croatian ice hockey champions. Late in 1971 the "Recreational Center Zibel" rink was finished and the first international hockey match in Sisak was played between KHL Medveščak Zagreb and Tesla Pardubice from Czech Republic.

Hockey has continued to evolve in Yugoslavia; Sisak was sponsored by INA oil company and bore their name. "INA" Sisak repeatedly won first place in the second division of the state championships, and appeared in the first division. Through several years of play, with greater or lesser success, Sisak's young hockey players from the club "INA" became the junior Croatian champions in 1979. In the 1980/81 Croatian league season, the youngest "INA" team won the championship.

== Club identity ==
KHL Sisak's traditional colours are blue and green. These two colours are consistent with the colours of the flag of Sisak. The club plays home matches in mostly blue uniform, while the away uniform is predominantly white. The badge represents a knight, also one of the city symbols, representing its rich history.

== Honours ==
Croatian Ice Hockey League

- (gold) Winners (4): 2021–22, 2023–24, 2024–25, 2025–26
- (silver) Runners-up (1): 2022–23

== Sponsors ==
KHL Sisak sponsors include companies such as DELTA MM STEELIX, Maxam Detines, Minoa automobiles, Titan Sisak, X-Tech automotive, Zagrebtrans.

== KHL Sisak in Europe ==
After winning the Croatian Ice Hockey League in 2022, KHL Sisak qualified for the first time in the IIHF Continental Cup. The draw placed KHL Sisak in group A together with Tartu Kalev-Välk, HC NSA Sofia, and Skautafélag Akureyrar. In the final group match in Sofia, Sisak secured their historic qualification for the second round with a win against the hosts.

IIHF Continental Cup
Season	Round	Club	Score	Aggregate
2022–23	First stage (Sofia, Bulgaria)	(Estonia) Tartu Kalev-Välk	2–7	1st place
2022–23	First stage (Sofia, Bulgaria)	(Iceland) Skautafélag Akureyrar	2–6	1st place
2022–23	First stage (Sofia, Bulgaria)	(Bulgaria) HC NSA Sofia	9–6	1st place
2022–23	Second stage (Angers, France)	(Romania) SC Miercurea Ciuc	5–0	4th place
2022–23	Second stage (Angers, France)	(France) Ducs d'Angers	0–12	4th place
2022–23	Second stage (Angers, France)	(Hungary) Ferencvárosi TC (ice hockey)	10–2	4th place
2024–25	First stage (Sofia, Bulgaria)	(Serbia) SKHL Crvena zvezda	1–7	1st place
2024–25	First stage (Sofia, Bulgaria)	(Belgium) Bulldogs Liège	6–1	1st place
2024–25	First stage (Sofia, Bulgaria)	(Bulgaria) Irbis-Skate Sofia	15–1	1st place
2024–25	Second stage (Ritten, Italy)	(Slovenia) HDD Jesenice	1–3	3rd place
2024–25	Second stage (Ritten, Italy)	(Italy) Ritten Sport	2–10	3rd place
2024–25	Second stage (Ritten, Italy)	(Ukraine) Sokil Kyiv	4–2	3rd place

== Players ==
=== Current roster ===
Source: As of: August 2, 2026

No.	Nat	Player	Pos	S/G	Age	Acquired	Birthplace
29	(Croatia)	Vilim Rosandić	G	L	30	2024	Zagreb, Croatia
95	(Croatia)	Vito Nikolić (ice hockey)	G	L	28	2025	Zagreb, Croatia
	(Croatia)	Mika Andrić	G	L	22	2026	Zagreb, Croatia
	(Croatia)	Lucas Peric	D	L	25	2026	Georgetown, Canada
21	(Croatia)	Niko Čavlović	D	R	23	2023	Zagreb, Croatia
97	(Croatia)	Marko Vukadin	D	L	21	2023	Zagreb, Croatia
	(Croatia)	Antonio Trepša	D	L	16	2026	Sisak, Croatia
41	(Croatia)	Lovro Slovinac	D	L	21	2024	Zagreb, Croatia
	(Croatia)	Bruno Zovko	F	L	20	2024	Zagreb, Croatia
	(Croatia)	Nicholas Domitrovic	C	R	27	2026	Ottawa, Canada
24	(Croatia)	Ivan Puzić (C)	D	L	30	2021	Zagreb, Croatia
	(Finland)	Toivo Laaksonen	RW	R	22	2026	Salo, Finland
71	(Slovenia)	Nejc Brus	D	L	27	2025	Slovenia
20	(Croatia)	Vito Idžan	F	L	23	2024	Zagreb, Croatia
87	(Croatia)	Ivor Bujger	F	L	21	2019	Sisak, Croatia
23	(Lithuania)	Marijus Dumčius	C	R	22	2025	Vilnius, Lithuania
5	(Croatia)	Patrik Dobrić (A)	D/F	L	25	2021	Zagreb, Croatia
44	(Slovenia)	Tjaš Lesničar	C	R	22	2025	Jesenice, Slovenia
17	(Croatia)	Karlo Marinković	F	L	22	2024	Zagreb, Croatia
	(Croatia)	Anthony Tabak	LW	L	24	2026	Oakville, Canada
88	(Croatia)	Nikša Jurić	C	L	21	2025	Zagreb, Croatia
4	(Croatia)	Ante Bebek	F	L	23	2023	Zagreb, Croatia
	(Croatia)	Lovro Kumanović	F	R	22	2026	Zagreb, Croatia
9	(Croatia)	Fran Završki	F	L	21	2025	Zagreb, Croatia
13	(Croatia)	Matko Idžan	F	L	17	2025	Zagreb, Croatia
	(Croatia)	Filip Svjetličić	F	L	19	2026	Zagreb, Croatia
91	(Croatia)	Alan Lizatović	D	R	22	2026	Prague, Czech Republic
10	(Croatia)	Luka Bodiroga	RW	L	20	2025	Zagreb, Croatia

== Retired numbers ==
KHL Sisak has retired one number in their history.

Retired numbers
No.	Player	Position	Retired
22	Darko Lončar	F	1983
