= KHL Mladost =

- City: Zagreb, Croatia
- League: International Hockey League; Croatian Ice Hockey League
- Founded: 1946; 80 years ago
- Operated: 1946–present
- Home arena: Dvorana Velesajam
- Colours: Yellow, black
- General manager: Duško Janjatović
- Head coach: Miro Smerdelj
- Website: khl-mladost.hr

Klub hokeja na ledu Mladost, commonly referred to as KHL Mladost or simply Mladost, is a Croatian professional ice hockey team that currently plays in the Croatian Ice Hockey League, as well as in the International Hockey League.

The club was founded in 1946 as part of HAŠK Mladost and in 1986 became the independent under the name KHL Mladost – Zagreb.

The KHL Mladost ("Youth") organization puts a large emphasis on junior development.

== Honours ==
- Yugoslav Ice Hockey League

Winners (2): 1946–47, 1948–49

- Croatian Ice Hockey League

Winners (2): 2008, 2021

- Panonian League

Winners (1): 2008
