= KHL Medveščak Zagreb =

Croatian ice hockey team

Medveščak
- Nickname: Medv(j)edi (The bears)
- City: Zagreb, Croatia
- League: Yugoslav Hockey League (1961–1991); Croatian Ice Hockey League (1991–present); Interliga; Slohokej League (2007–2009); Erste Bank Eishockey Liga (2009–2013; 2017–2019); Kontinental Hockey League (2013–2017); International Hockey League (2017–present)
- Founded: 1961; 65 years ago (as KHL Medveščak)
- Home arena: Admiral Ice Dome (capacity: 850); Dom Sportova (capacity: 5,000); Arena Zagreb (capacity: 15,500)
- Colours
- President: Dalibor Lebarović
- Head coach: Danijel Kolombo
- Website: https://medvescak.com/

Franchise history
- KHL Medveščak Admiral

KHL Medveščak Admiral (Croatian: Klub hokeja na ledu Medveščak Admiral, lit. 'Ice Hockey Club Medveščak Admiral'), also known as KHL Medveščak Zagreb, is a Croatian professional ice hockey team based in Zagreb, established in 1961. The team's name derives from the location of its original arena in the Medveščak area in central Zagreb. It is the most successful and popular ice hockey team in the country.

From 1961 to 1991 the club was member of the Yugoslav League, before joining the Croatian League amid the breakup of Yugoslavia. In 2007 they also played in the Slovenian League for two seasons, and then the Austrian League from 2009 to 2013. From 2013 until 2017 they played in the Kontinental Hockey League, before returning to the EBEL. They have also participated in multiple editions of the IIHF Continental Cup.

In 2003 they formed a farm team, KHL Medveščak Zagreb II, which gradually took its place in the Croatian League, and which also competed briefly in regional competitions in the 2003–04 Panonian League and the 2009–10 Slohokej League.

Medveščak hosted most of their games at Dom Sportova, and occasionally at Arena Zagreb. In their first KHL season in 2013–14, it was the 16th most attended European club, with an average of 7,828 spectators per game, while their attendance during the 2016–17 season, 4,554 per game, was 72nd overall in Europe.

== History ==
=== Yugoslav league (1961–1990) ===
The team was established in 1961, as a successor team of the defunct SD Zagreb sports society. In its first ten seasons in the Yugoslav Ice Hockey League, Medveščak built up a following and became the second most popular sports team in Zagreb, behind only the local association football team Dinamo Zagreb. At the time, Medveščak played their home games at an outdoor rink in the upper-class neighbourhood of Šalata, attracting around 5,000 spectators on average. The team and club developed some great players including legends Boris Renaud and Ivo Ratej.

In 1971, the team permanently moved into the indoor rink at the Dom Sportova sports hall, with the capacity of 6,400. However, during the first two decades of their existence, Medveščak established itself as a mid-table team, and never managed to win the Yugoslav championship. By the early 1980s the club was mired in financial difficulties and narrowly avoided relegation from the country's top league in 1985.

The following season, in 1986, the club made a sponsorship deal with the locally-based Gortan construction company, which de facto became owner of the club. With much needed investments, the club started aggressively recruiting quality players, beginning with some Canadians including fan-favorites Jim Allison and Mike Coflin who quickly helped the team win and, more importantly, stimulated renewed fan interest in hockey. Crowds went from a few hundred to a regularly sold-out Dom Sportova (6000+ fans) over the next few seasons. After winning their first Yugoslav Cup in the 1987-1988 season with the help of the passionate Canadians, the next few years Gortan recruited some very talented, elite Russian players, including the Russian Hall of Famer Vyacheslav Anisin, the team was transformed into a powerhouse. From the late 1980s to the early 1990s, they became the best in Yugoslavia, dominating the national championship and winning three consecutive Yugoslav titles from 1989 to 1991, culminating in an appearance in the 1990–91 IIHF European Cup in which they progressed to the second round.

=== Croatian league (1991–present) ===
With the dissolution of Yugoslavia in 1991, the Gortan group, along with a host of club's sponsors, was plunged into a financial crisis, which led to them pulling out of the team. Without generous funding, the club lost its best players and professional status, and was reduced to competing as an amateur outfit in the newly formed Croatian Ice Hockey League. However, the club gradually improved and between the late 1990s and the late 2000s Medveščak dominated the league again, winning almost every championship.

Medveščak was additionally strengthened in the 2000s by establishing a farm team, KHL Medveščak II. It competed in the regional Panonian League in the 2003–04 season, and later joined the Croatian league in 2004.

In search of more competitive opponents to play, the team also took part in the Slovenian Hockey League from 2007 to 2009, finishing second place in their inaugural regular season. The following season, Medveščak was by far the best team in the Slovenian league (after the two best Slovenian clubs had joined the Austrian Hockey League a year earlier) during the regular season.

=== Austrian league (2009–2013) ===
Starting in the 2009–10 season, Medveščak once again moved up in competitive level, joining the Austrian Erste Bank Eishockey Liga which featured six Austrian clubs, two from Slovenia and one from Hungary and Croatia each. To mark their move up the professional ranks, the Bears recruited an American coach, Ted Sator, from fellow EBEL team Alba Volán Székesfehérvár. With a commitment to continue to participate in the Croatian league playoffs, Medveščak made their Austrian debut in front of a sellout crowd at the Dom Sportova in a 6–5 victory against Slovenian member HK Acroni Jesenice on 11 September 2009. The Bears drew over 200,000 spectators throughout the season's home games, and were rewarded for their efforts as the last team to qualify for a spot in the playoffs. In their inaugural season, they stunned top seeded Graz 99ers in the quarter-finals to knock them out in six games, before being eliminated by eventual champions EC Red Bull Salzburg in the semi-finals.

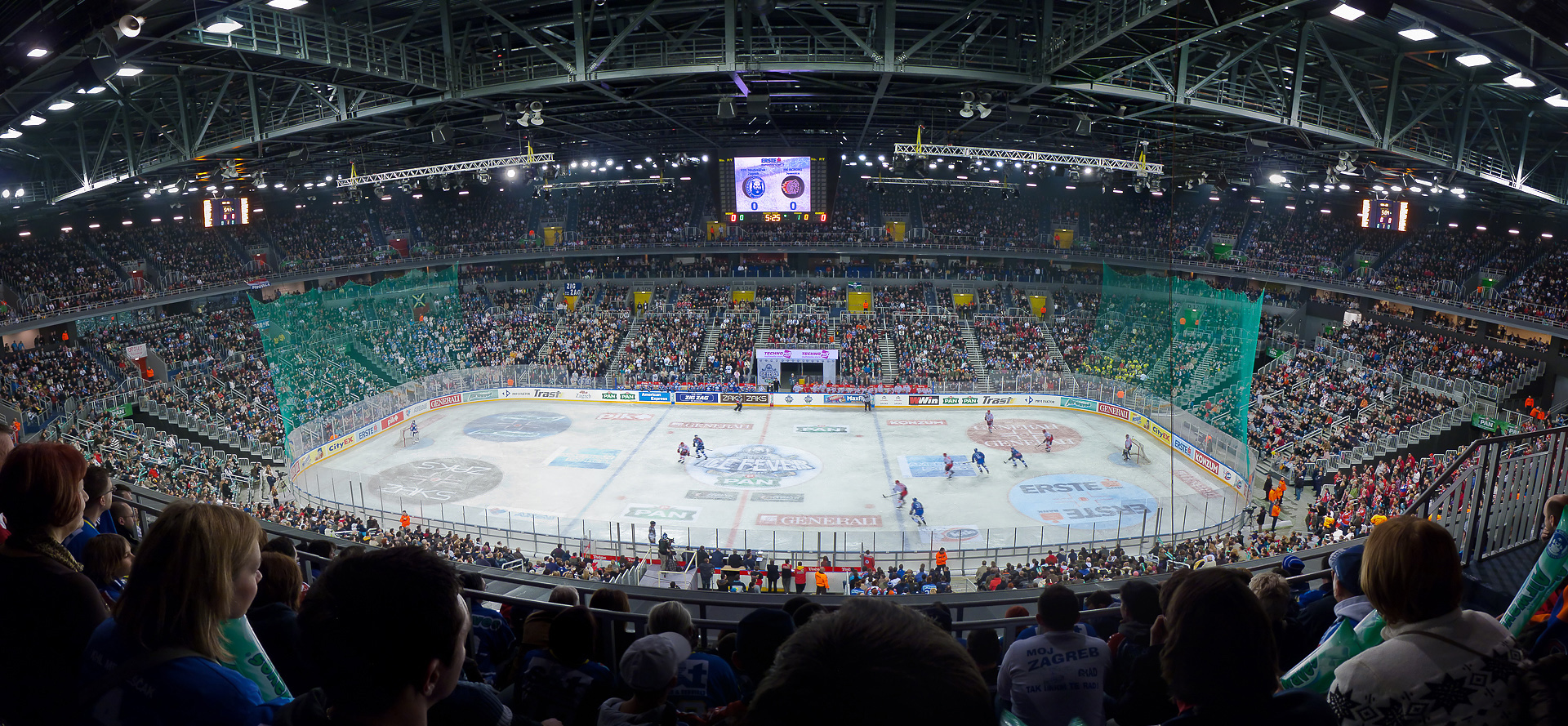
Medveščak game in Arena Zagreb

In a publicity stunt, Medveščak hosted its first two home games of the 2012–13 EBEL season in September 2012 at the ancient Roman Pula Arena. The first game ended in a 3–2 defeat to HDD Olimpija Ljubljana, and the second game was against Vienna Capitals which resulted in a 4–1 win.

=== Kontinental Hockey League (2013–2017) ===
On 29 April 2013, the club board announced that Medveščak would move to the Kontinental Hockey League for the 2013–14 season. This led to huge changes in both playing and coaching staff, with almost the entire squad replaced. The team was upgraded with lots of players with NHL experience, while Canadian Mark French became the club's new head coach.

On 6 September 2013, the Bears opened their debut season in the KHL with an impressive 7–1 win over Russian powerhouse CSKA Moscow. On 25 January 2014, Medveščak defeated Lokomotiv Yaroslavl 1–0 at Arena Zagreb and qualified for the KHL playoffs in their very first KHL season. In the first round of the playoffs, Medveščak played against later finalist Lev Prague, losing all four games.

Medveščak failed to qualify for the playoffs for the next two seasons. In the 2014–15 season, Medveščak took part in the 2014 Spengler Cup in Switzerland, losing all three games. The KHL is considered the best hockey league in Europe and before running into financial challenges, Medveščak iced competitive teams and the roster included some excellent players, including former NHL Rocket Richard trophy winner Jonathan Cheechoo.

On 13 January 2016, Russian fans threw two bananas on the ice after HC Spartak Moscow lost 4–1 in a KHL match at home to Medveščak Zagreb, targeting Medveščak's player Edwin Hedberg. Hedberg himself admitted he had encountered such behaviour for the first time, adding that "things like this shouldn't happen but unfortunately they do", while Medveščak's head coach, Gordie Dwyer, said that he was upset with the incident, and that "this obviously has no place in sport". Later, Spartak Moscow issued an official apology to both Medveščak and Hedberg, affirming that video cameras at Sokolniki Arena had helped identify two offenders who would be banned from attending games. The cameras also recorded racist hooting from the stands during a game incident involving Hedberg in the 35th minute of the match. The Kontinental Hockey League eventually fined Spartak Moscow 700,000 rubles ($9,135) for the racist incident and issued a "serious warning" to the club, adding that "breaches linked to the incitement of racial, ethnic, or international discord are unacceptable".

=== Return to Austrian League (2017–2019) ===
After a difficult 2016–17 KHL season, in which the club dealt with financial issues, it was announced they would be rejoining the Erste Bank Eishockey Liga for the 2017 season. In August 2019, they decided to participate with renamed team (KHL Medveščak Mladi) in national league, due to financial difficulties.

== UNICEF partnership ==
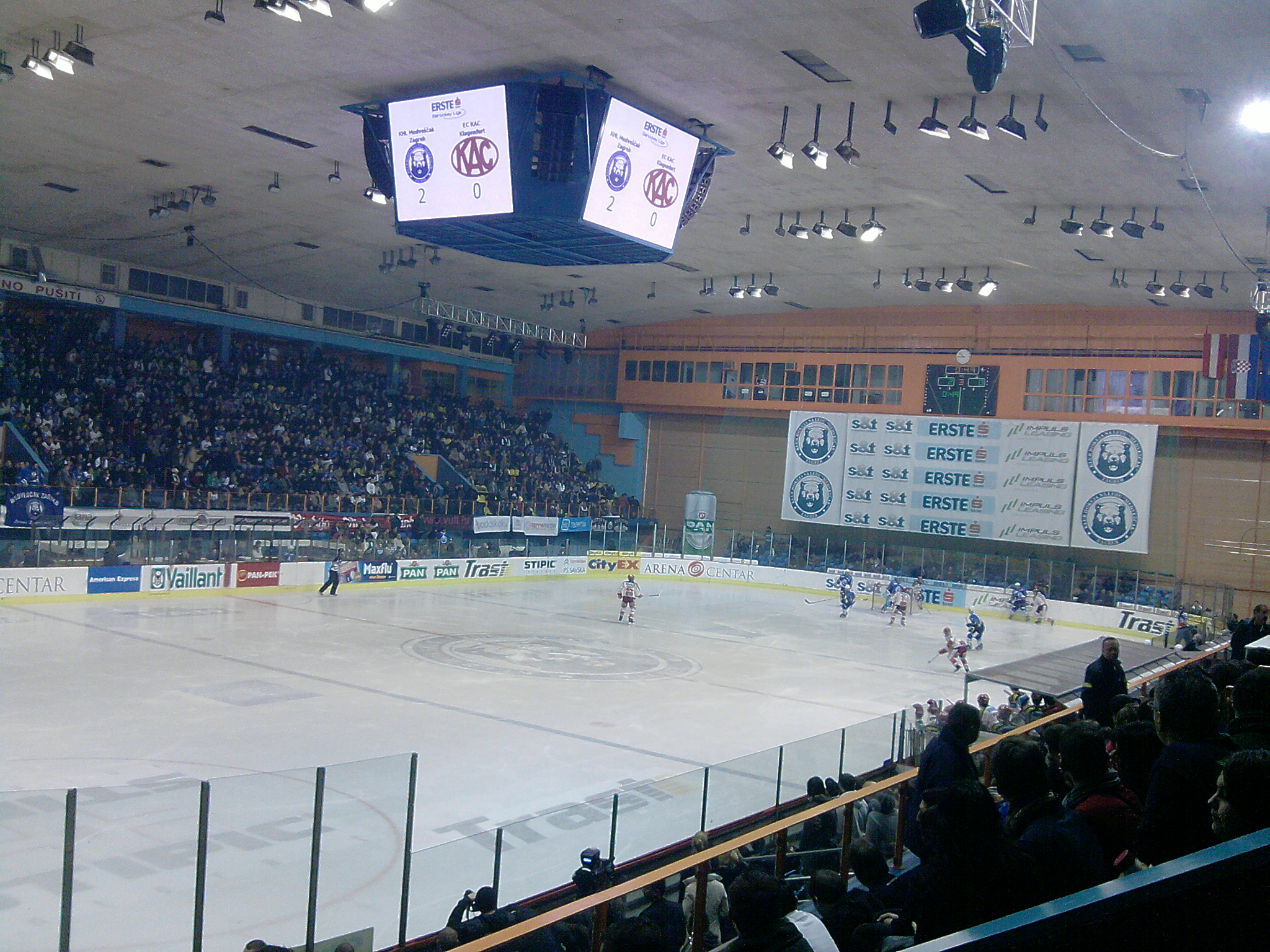
Dom Sportova, KHL Medveščak Zagreb – KAC Klagenfurt, 15 January 2010

On 24 August 2010, KHL Medveščak formed an official partnership with UNICEF, becoming the first European hockey team to cooperate with UNICEF, joining prestigious sports clubs such as FC Barcelona, Manchester United F.C. and Boca Juniors. The Bears were selected after the success they had in their inaugural season in the EBEL league, hosting more than 200,000 spectators watching live matches without a single incident, and also for its support for the relief campaign for victims of the 2010 Haiti earthquake. Under the cooperation between Medveščak and UNICEF, the Bears actively worked on the campaign to Stop Violence Among Children, and wore a UNICEF sleeve logo and change the club's blue logo color to that of UNICEF's cyan at joint events.

== Sponsors ==
Medveščak's sponsors included companies such as Podravka, Citroen, Generali, Lidl, Carlsberg Croatia and others.

== Season-by-season record ==
Regular season record									Playoffs record							
Season	POS	G	W	OPW	OPL	L	G+	G−	POFF	G	W	OPW	OPL	L	G+	G−
Slovenian Hockey League
2007–08	2/10	28	18	1	1	8	124	95	did not qualify for playoffs							
2008–09	1/10	35	33	0	1	1	227	66	Semi-finals	7	4	1	0	2	27	17
TOTAL	2	63	51	1	2	9	351	161	1	7	4	1	0	2	27	17
Austrian Hockey League
2009–10	8/10	54	16	9	7	22	160	182	Semi-finals	11	3	2	0	6	27	31
2010–11	8/10	54	17	6	5	26	171	171	Quarter-finals	5	1	0	1	3	18	20
2011–12	2/10	50	26	4	6	14	166	128	Semi-finals	9	5	0	0	4	25	26
2012–13	4/10	54	27	4	8	15	175	140	Quarter-finals	6	2	0	3	1	19	21
TOTAL	4	212	86	23	26	77	672	621	4	31	11	2	4	14	89	98
Kontinental Hockey League
2013–14	11/28	54	24	4	12	14	138	126	1st round	4	0	0	0	4	9	17
2014–15	23/28	60	17	6	5	32	147	191	did not qualify for playoffs							
2015–16	20/28	60	19	6	9	26	144	172	did not qualify for playoffs							
2016–17	24/29	60	19	4	4	33	138	186	did not qualify for playoffs							
TOTAL	4	234	79	20	30	105	567	675	1	4	0	0	0	4	9	17
Austrian Hockey League
2017–18																

G - games played, W - win, OPW - overtime or penalties win, OPL - overtime or penalties loss, L - loss, G+ - goals for, G− - goals against

== Honours ==
(gold) Yugoslav Ice Hockey League: 3

  - 1989, 1990, 1991

(gold) Yugoslav Ice Hockey Cup: 4

  - 1988, 1989, 1990, 1991

(gold) Croatian Ice Hockey Championship: 22

  - 1995, 1997, 1998, 1999, 2000, 2001, 2002, 2003, 2004, 2005, 2006, 2007, 2009, 2010, 2011, 2012, 2013, 2014, 2015, 2016, 2017, 2018

(gold) International Hockey League: 1

  - 2018

(gold) Tournament Biasca Biask: 1

  - 2013

(gold) Gaubodenvolksfest-Cup: 1

  - 2015
