= KHL Zagreb =

Croatian ice hockey team

- City: Zagreb, Croatia
- League: Croatian Ice Hockey League
- Founded: 1982
- Home arena: Dvorana Velesajam
- Colours: Blue, red, white
- President: Renato Krikšić
- General manager: Mislav Blagus
- Website: www.khlzagreb.hr

Franchise history
- 1982–present: KHL Zagreb

Klub Hokeja na Ledu Zagreb, commonly referred to as KHL Zagreb or simply Zagreb, is a Croatian professional ice hockey team that plays in the Croatian Ice Hockey League and the International Hockey League. It played in the IIHF European Champions Cup in 1993, 1994, 1995 and 1997, reaching the first round. The team also played in the former Panonian League.

== Honours ==
- Croatian Ice Hockey League

Winners (6): 1992, 1993, 1994, 1996, 2019, 2023
