= Turkish Ice Hockey Federation =

Ice hockey governing body of Turkey

Türkiye
- Association name: Türkiye Ice Hockey Federation
- IIHF Code: TUR
- IIHF membership: May 1, 1991
- President: Halit Albayrak
- IIHF men's ranking: 41st (August 2018)
- IIHF women's ranking: 31st (August 2018)

Türkiye Ice Hockey Federation (Turkish: Türkiye Buz Hokeyi Federasyonu, TBHF) is the governing body of the ice hockey sport in Turkey. It was established in 1991 as the Turkish Ice Sports Federation (Turkish: Türkiye Buz Sporları Federasyonu, TBSF). It is a member of the International Ice Hockey Federation (IIHF) since May 1, 1991. The TBHF is based in Ankara and its current chairman is Halit Albayrak.

TBHF conducts seven ice hockey leagues for men's and women's. The federation organizes also the national teams for men's, men's junior, men's U-18 and women's. As of October 2012, Turkey men's national team ranks 39th and the women's 35th in the world.

== History ==
Ice hockey playing started in Turkey in the beginning of the 1980s at Atatürk ice rink and on the frozen pool of Youth Park in Ankara and Korukent ice rink in Istanbul. The first ice hockey match dates back to January 9, 1988 played at Atatürk ice rink in Ankara between the teams of Ankara and Istanbul, which were coached by an American Glenn Brown and Sinisha Tomic from Yugoslavia respectively.

By February 1989, the "Buz Pateni Sarayı" (literally "Ice Skating Palace"), country's first Olympic size hockey rink was opened in Ankara, which initiated the ice hockey in Turkey. Founding of an ice hockey school the same year by Cüneyt Kozan and Fahri Paslı was one of the most basic and important steps in the development of this sport branch in Turkey. Some of the sportspeople, who learnt playing ice hockey at this school, are still members of the national team.

Ankara Buz Pateni Sarayı hosted the first match ever played in compliance with the international rules and regulations end of 1989 between Ankara Tarım Kredi Spor and Istanbul Paten Kulübü teams.

By January 1990, ice hockey sport was subordinated to the Turkish Ski Federation, and the first official championship ever was organized among two teams from Ankara and two from Istanbul.

With the foundation of the Turkish Ice Sports Federation in 1991, ice hockey sport separated from the Turkish Ski Federation and came along with figure skating sport under the authority of the new organization. Turkey became a member of the International Ice Hockey Federation IIHF the same year, and formed the national team to participate at the 1992 World championships Group C tournaments.

The rising interest in ice hockey effected the increasing number of players and then the teams. Rino Ouellette, a Canadian diplomat in Ankara, who coached two teams consecutively, contributed much to the development of ice hockey sport in Turkey. A tournament, organized in 1992, laid the ground stone for the establishment of Turkey's first ice hockey league in 1993.

As of March 2013, the total number of ice hockey players is 790 consisting of 310 men's, 320 juniors and 160 women's. From 1992 on, the federation conducted regularly courses for referees and trainers. There are a total of 110 referees as of March 2013.

Under increasing competition pressure, the teams were forced to transfer valuable players from countries with ice hockey tradition like Canada, Russia, Ukraine etc. The presence of the foreign sportspeople contributed considerable to the enhancement of this sport resulting in Turkey's first international win in 1997 against New Zealand.

In the end of 2006, ice hockey sport detached on International Skating Union's recommendation from the Turkish Ice Sports Federation establishing its own organization.

== Domestic events and teams ==
The TBHF conducts in the 2012-2013 season seven leagues. In the Turkish Ice Hockey Super League, eight teams compete. Turkish Ice Hockey First League comprises five teams. In the Juniors (U-20) League, there are eleven teams. The Turkish Ice Hockey Women's League debuted in February 2007 with 7 teams. As of October 2012, the total number of ice hockey players in Turkey is 790, consisting of 310 male, 160 female and 320 junior players.

There are eight Olympic-size indoor ice hockey rinks and three outdoor rinks across Turkey as of October 2012.

Turkish ice hockey competitions

- Turkish Ice Hockey Super League (TBHF Erkekler Süper Ligi)
- Turkish Ice Hockey Women's League (TBHF Bayanlar Ligi)
- Turkish Ice Hockey First League (TBHF Erkekler 1. Ligi)
- Turkish Ice Hockey Juniors (U-20) League (TBHF 20 Yaş altı Genç Erkekler Ligi)
- Turkish Ice Hockey Youth (U-18) League (TBHF 18 Yaş altı Genç Erkekler Ligi,)
- Turkish Ice Hockey Boys (U-14) League (TBHF Yıldızlar Ligi)
- Turkish Ice Hockey U-10 League (TBHF Minikler Ligi)

=== Prize money ===
The federation re-evaluated the prize money scheme for all the six divisions valid in the 2010–11 season.

Prize Money Scheme (in TUL)*
League	Champion	Runner-up	Third	Fourth	Fifth
Super League	25,000	15,000	10,000		
Women's League	12,500	7,500	5,000		
First League	5,000	3,000	2,000		
Juniors (U-20) League	5,000	3,000	2,000		
Youth (U-18) League	5,000	3,000	2,000		
Boys (U-14) League	3,000	2,000	2,000	1,000	1,000

- 1 TUL = 0.65 US$ (approx. currency exchange rate as of March 2011)

=== Turkish Ice Hockey Super League ===
2011-12 season

==== Group A ====
Club	Home town	Arena	Founded
Kocaeli B.B. Kağıt SK	Izmit	Kocaeli	2000
B.B. Ankara SK	Ankara	Bel-Pa	1978
Erzurum Gençlik SK	Erzurum	Erzurum	
Anka SK	Ankara	Bel-Pa	2004
İstanbul Paten SK	Istanbul	Silivrikapı	1987
Ankara Truva Paten SK	Ankara	Bel-Pa	2005

==== Group B ====
Club	Home town	Arena	Founded
Başkent Yıldızları SK	Ankara	Bel-Pa	1998
Ankara Üniversitesi SK	Ankara	Bel-Pa	1948
Boğaziçi Paten SK	Istanbul	Silivrikapı	1986
Izmir BB GSK	Bornova		
Erzurum B.B. SK	Erzurum	Erzurum	

=== Turkish Ice Hockey First League ===
Club	Home town	Arena	Founded
ABBA SK	Ankara	Bel-Pa	2005
Ankara Emniyet SK	Ankara	Bel-Pa	1990
Ankara Üniversitesi SK	Ankara	Bel-Pa	1948
İzmit Şirintepe SK	Izmit	Kocaeli	2000
ODTÜ SK	Ankara	Bel-Pa	1962
Ankara Truva Paten SK	Ankara	Bel-Pa	2005
Yükseliş SK	Ankara	Bel-Pa	2007
İstanbul Üniversitesi SBK	Istanbul	Silivrikapı	2010

=== Turkish Ice Hockey Women's League ===
==== Group A ====
Club	Home town	Arena	Founded
Anka SK	Ankara	Bel-Pa	2004
Ankara Üniversitesi SK	Ankara	Bel-Pa	1948
ODTÜ SK	Ankara	Bel-Pa	1962
Polis Akademisi ve Koleji SK	Ankara	Bel-Pa	1996
Ankara Truva Paten SK	Ankara	Bel-Pa	2005

==== Group B ====
Club	Home town	Arena	Founded
ABBA SK	Ankara	Bel-Pa	2005
Boğaziçi Paten SK	Istanbul	Silivrikapı	1986
Başkent Yıldızları Buz Hokeyi SK	Ankara	Bel-Pa	1998
Kocaeli B.B. Kağıt SK	Izmit	Kocaeli	2000
Milenyum Paten SK	Ankara	Bel-Pa	2002

=== Turkish Juniors (U20) League ===
Club	Home town	Arena
Anka SK	Ankara	Bel-Pa
B.B. Ankara SK	Ankara	Bel-Pa
Ankara Emniyetspor	Ankara	Bel-Pa
Ankara Truva Paten SK	Ankara	Bel-Pa
Başkent Yıldızları Buz Hokeyi SK	Ankara	Bel-Pa
İstanbul TED Kolejliler SK	Istanbul	Silivrikapı
İzmit Buz Sporları Paten KD	Kocaeli	Kocaeli
İzmit Çenesuyu SK	Kocaeli	Kocaeli
İzmit Şirintepe SK	Kocaeli	Kocaeli
Kocaeli B.B. Kağıt SK	Kocaeli	Kocaeli
Şampiyon SK	Ankara	Bel-Pa

=== Turkish Ice Hockey U-10 Championship ===
2011-12 Season

==== Group A ====
Club	Home town
Istanbul Buz Korsanları	Istanbul
Ankara Üniversitesi SK	Ankara
ABBA SK	Ankara
Erzurum Gençlik SK	Erzurum

==== Group B ====
Club	Home town
Şampiyon SK	Istanbul
Buzun Aslanları SK	Ankara
Boğaziçi Paten SK	Istanbul
Buz Kaplanları SK	Istanbul

== Results summary ==
As of 5 Feb 2023.

OTW and OTL Suppose Draw.

#	Team	M	W	D	L	GF	GA	GD
1	Turkey men's national ice hockey team	124	45	4	75	466	911	-445
2	Turkey men's national junior ice hockey team	103	35	2	66	244	677	-433
3	Turkey men's national under-18 ice hockey team	96	26	4	66	319	816	-497
4	Turkey women's national ice hockey team	60	14	3	43	159	431	-272
5	Turkey women's national under-18 ice hockey team	18	4	1	13	16	109	-93
Total	5 Team	401	124	14	263	1204	2944	-1740

== International events ==
Turkish national ice hockey teams took part in the following events:

2002

- Men's World Championship - Div. II (Gr. A) - March 31-April 6, 2002 in Cape Town, South Africa - 6th place, relegated to Division III.

2003

- World Junior Championship - Div. III - January 21–26, 2003 in İzmit, Turkey - 3rd place.
- Men's World Championships - Div. III - April 3–6, 2003 in Auckland, New Zealand.

2004

- World Junior Championship - Div. III - January 5–11, 2004 in Sofia, Bulgaria - 4th place.
- Men's World Championship - Div. III - March 16–21, 2004 in Reykjavík, Iceland - 2nd place (Promoted to Division II).

2005

- World Junior Championship - Div. III - January 10–16, 2005 in Mexico City, Mexico - 5th place.
- World U18 Championship Div. III Qualification - March 7–13 in Sofia, Bulgaria - 5th place
- Men's World Championships - Div. II (Gr. A) - April 10–16, 2005 in Zagreb, Croatia - 6th place (Relegated to Division III).

2006

- World Junior Championship - Div. III - January 3–9, 2006 in Kaunas, Lithuania - 3rd place.
- World U18 Championships - Div. III - March 13–19, 2006 in Miercurea-Ciuc, Romania - 6th place.
- Men's World Championship - Div. III - April 24–29, 2006 in Reykjavík, Iceland - 2nd place (Promoted to Division II).

2007

- World Junior Championship - Div. III - January 8–14, 2007 in Ankara, Turkey - 5th place.
- World U18 Championships - Div. III - March 5–11, 2007 in Beijing, China - 6th place.
- Women's World Championships - Div. IV - March 26-April 1, 2007 in Miercurea-Ciuc, Romania - 6th place.
- World Championship - Div. II (Group A) - April 11–17, 2007 in Zagreb, Croatia - 6th place (Relegated to Division III).

2008

- World Junior Championship - Div. III - January 16–24, 2008 in Belgrade, Serbia - 6th place.
- World U18 Championships - Div. III (Gr. B) - March 3–9, 2008 in Izmit, Turkey - 3rd place.
- Women's World Championships - Div. IV - March 23–29, 2008 in Miercurea-Ciuc, Romania - 6th place.
- World Championship - Div. III - March 31-April 4, 2008 in Luxembourg City, Luxembourg - 4th place.

2009

- World U18 Championships – Div. III (Gr. B) - March 9–15 in Erzurum, Turkey - 2nd place.
- World Championship - Div. III - April 10–16 in Dunedin, New Zealand - 2nd place, promoted to Division II.

2010

- World Junior Championships – Div. III (Gr. B) - January 4–10, 2010 in Istanbul, Turkey - 4th place.
- World U18 Championships - Div. III (Gr. A) - March 14–20, 2010 in Erzurum, Turkey - 2nd place.
- World Championship - Div. II (Gr. A) - April 10–17 in Lomas Verdes, Mexico - 6th place, relegated to Division III

2011

- World Junior Championships – Div. III - January 9–18 in Mexico City, Mexico - 4th place.
- Winter Universiade - Men's - January 27-February 6, 2011 in Erzurum, Turkey - 12th place.
- Winter Universiade - Women's - January 27-February 5, 2011 in Erzurum, Turkey - 6th place.
- Women's World Championships – Div. V - March 14–20 in Sofia, Bulgaria - 4th place
- World U18 Championships – Div. III (Gr. A) - 4th place.
- World Championship Div. III - April 11–17 in Cape Town, South Africa - 3rd place.

2012

- World Junior Championships – Div. III - January 17–22 in Dunedin, New Zealand - 6th place.
- World Championship - Div. III - April 15–21, 2012 in Erzurum, Turkey

2013

- World Junior Championships – Div. III - January 14–20 in Sofia, Bulgaria - 5th place.
- World U18 Championships - Div. III (Gr. B) - February 7–10 in İzmit, Turkey - 4th place.
- World Championship - Div. II (Gr. B) - April 21–27 in İzmit, Turkey - 5th place.
- Women's World Championship - Div. II (Gr. B) Qualification - December 7–9, 2012 in İzmir, Turkey - 1st place, promoted to Division II.

2014

- World Junior Championships – Div. III - January 12–18 in İzmir, Turkey - 4th place.
- World U18 Championship - Div. III (Gr. B) - February 13–15 in İzmit, Turkey - 5th place.
- World Championship - Div. II (Gr. B) - April 5–11 in Jaca, Spain - 6th place (Relegated to the 2015 Division III).
- Women's World Championship - Div. II (Gr. B) -March 24–30 in Reykjavík, Iceland - 6th place, (Relegated to the 2015 Division II B Qualification).

2015

- World Junior Championships – Div. III - January 20–25 in Saint Kilda, Dunedin, New Zealand - 4th place.
- World U18 Championship - Div. III (Gr. B) - March 17–19 in Auckland, New Zealand - 5th place.
- World Championship - Div. IIi - April 3–12 in İzmir, Turkey .
- Women's World Championship - Div. II (Gr. B Qualification) - February 18–21 in Hong Kong, China - 1st place.

== Coach ==
The national team's head coach is Jim MacEachern form Manitouwadge, Ontario, Canada. Jim coached the four Turkish national teams for the 2007-2008 season and is currently negotiating an extension of his contract.

== See also ==
- Turkish Ice Hockey Super League
- Turkish Ice Hockey First League
- Turkish Ice Hockey Women's League
- Turkey national men's ice hockey team
- Turkey men's national junior ice hockey team
- Turkey men's national under-18 ice hockey team
- Turkey national women's ice hockey team
- List of members of the International Ice Hockey Federation
