= 2007–08 TBHSL season =

The 2007–08 Turkish Ice Hockey Super League season was the 16th season of the Turkish Ice Hockey Super League, the top level of ice hockey in Turkey. Seven teams participated in the league.

== Regular season ==
	Club	GP	W	T	L	Goals	Pts
1.	Kocaeli B.B. Kağıt SK	12	11	0	1	132:25	33
2.	Polis Akademisi ve Koleji	12	11	0	1	135:31	33
3.	Başkent Yıldızları SK	12	8	0	4	102:62	24
4.	TED Ankara Koleji SK	12	6	0	6	89:100	18
5.	İstanbul Paten SK	12	3	1	8	46:80	10
6.	B.B. Ankara SK	12	1	1	10	29:152	4
7.	Anka SK	12	1	0	11	41:124	3

== Playoffs ==
=== Semifinals ===
- Kocaeli Büyükşehir Belediyesi Kağıt Spor Kulübü - TED Ankara Koleji SK 18:4
- Polis Akademisi ve Koleji - Başkent Yıldızları Spor Kulübü 6:2

=== 3rd place ===
- TED Ankara Koleji SK - Başkent Yıldızları Spor Kulübü 9:10

=== Final ===
- Kocaeli Büyükşehir Belediyesi Kağıt Spor Kulübü - Polis Akademisi ve Koleji 1:4
