= 2006–07 TBHSL season =

The 2006–07 Turkish Ice Hockey Super League season was the 15th season of the Turkish Ice Hockey Super League, the top level of ice hockey in Turkey. Eight teams participated in the league.

== Standings ==
	Club	GP	W	T	L	Goals	Pts
1.	Kocaeli Büyükşehir Belediyesi Kağıt Spor Kulübü	14	13	0	1	198:32	39
2.	Polis Akademisi ve Koleji	14	13	0	1	131:31	39
3.	Anka Spor Kulübü	14	8	1	5	48:77	25
4.	Başkent Yıldızları Spor Kulübü	14	7	1	6	66:68	22
5.	İstanbul Paten Spor Kulübü	14	6	0	8	40:72	18
6.	Büyükşehir Belediyesi Ankara Spor Kulübü	14	4	1	9	36:103	13
7.	TED Ankara Koleji SK	14	3	1	10	36:94	10
8.	Şampiyon Spor Kulübü	14	0	0	14	2:80	0
