= 2011–12 TBHSL season =

The 2011–12 Turkish Ice Hockey Super League season was the 20th season of the Turkish Ice Hockey Super League, the top level of ice hockey in Turkey. 11 teams participated in the league, and Başkent Yıldızları Spor Kulübü won the championship.

== Regular season ==
=== Group A ===
	Club	GP	W	OTW	OTL	L	Goals	Pts
1.	Kocaeli B.B. Kağıt SK	10	10	0	0	0	119:24	30
2.	Erzurum Gençlik SK	10	8	0	0	2	75:30	24
3.	Ankara Truva	10	6	0	0	4	90:63	18
4.	B.B. Ankara SK	10	4	0	0	6	51:79	12
5.	Istanbul Paten K	10	2	0	0	8	31:123	6
6.	Anka SK	10	0	0	0	10	3:50	0

=== Group B ===
	Club	GP	W	OTW	OTL	L	Goals	Pts
1.	Başkent Yıldızları SK	8	8	0	0	2	179:10	24
2.	Izmir BB GSK	8	6	0	0	2	126:23	18
3.	Ankara Üniversitesi SK	8	4	0	0	4	58:45	12
4.	Boğaziçi Paten K	8	1	0	0	7	20:150	3
5.	Erzurum B.B. SK	8	1	0	0	7	12:167	3

== Playoffs ==
=== 3rd place game ===
Izmir BB GSK defeated Erzurum Gençlik SK placing third.

=== Final ===
Başkent Yıldızları SK defeated Kocaeli B.B. Kağıt SK becoming league champion.
