= 2008–09 TBHSL season =

The 2008–09 Turkish Ice Hockey Super League season was the 17th season of the Turkish Ice Hockey Super League, the top level of ice hockey in Turkey. Six teams participated in the league.

== Regular season ==
	Club	GP	W	T	L	Goals	Pts
1.	Kocaeli B.B. Kağıt SK	10	9	0	1	149:18	27
2.	Polis Akademisi ve Koleji	10	8	0	2	141:28	24
3.	Başkent Yıldızları SK	10	7	0	3	131:44	21
4.	İstanbul Paten SK	10	3	0	7	21:104	9
5.	Anka SK	10	2	0	8	28:158	6
6.	B.B. Ankara SK	10	1	0	9	23:141	3

== Playoffs ==
=== Semifinals ===
- Başkent Yıldızları Spor Kulübü - Polis Akademisi ve Koleji 2:6/2:14
- Kocaeli Büyükşehir Belediyesi Kağıt Spor Kulübü - İstanbul Paten Spor Kulübü 38:0/16:0

=== 3rd place ===
- İstanbul Paten Spor Kulübü - Başkent Yıldızları Spor Kulübü 3:24

=== Final ===
- Polis Akademisi ve Koleji - Kocaeli Büyükşehir Belediyesi Kağıt Spor Kulübü 11:6/11:3
