= 2005–06 TBHSL season =

The 2005–06 Turkish Ice Hockey Super League season was the 14th season of the Turkish Ice Hockey Super League, the top level of ice hockey in Turkey. Six teams participated in the league.

== Standings ==
	Club	GP	W	T	L	Goals	Pts
1.	Polis Akademisi ve Koleji	20	18	0	2	252:58	36
2.	Kocaeli Büyükşehir Belediyesi Kağıt Spor Kulübü	20	12	0	8	203:66	24
3.	Anka Spor Kulübü	20	11	0	9	99:130	22
4.	Büyükşehir Belediyesi Ankara Spor Kulübü	20	10	0	10	106:149	20
5.	Şampiyon Spor Kulübü	20	5	0	15	67:195	10
6.	İstanbul Paten Spor Kulübü	20	4	0	16	58:187	8
