= 2009–10 TBHSL season =

The 2009–10 Turkish Ice Hockey Super League season was the 18th season of the Turkish Ice Hockey Super League, the top level of ice hockey in Turkey. Six teams participated in the league.

== Regular season ==
	Club	GP	W	T	L	Goals	Pts
1.	Ankara Üniversitesi SK	10	8	1	1	171:41	25
2.	Başkent Yıldızları SK	10	8	1	1	126:40	25
3.	Kocaeli B.B. Kağıt SK	10	6	1	3	119:50	19
4.	Polis Akademisi ve Koleji	10	4	1	5	100:67	13
5.	B.B. Ankara SK	10	2	0	8	38:139	6
6.	Kocaeli Sirintepe SK	10	0	0	10	10:227	0

== Playoffs ==
=== Semifinals ===
- Ankara Üniversitesi Spor Kulübü - Kocaeli Büyükşehir Belediyesi Kağıt Spor Kulübü 7:2
- Başkent Yıldızları Spor Kulübü - Polis Akademisi ve Koleji 8:1

=== 3rd place ===
- Kocaeli Büyükşehir Belediyesi Kağıt Spor Kulübü - Polis Akademisi ve Koleji 6:8

=== Final ===
- Ankara Üniversitesi Spor Kulübü - Başkent Yıldızları Spor Kulübü 7:3
