= 2004–05 TBHSL season =

Turkish ice hockey sports season

The 2004–05 Turkish Ice Hockey Super League season was the 13th season of the Turkish Ice Hockey Super League, the top level of ice hockey in Turkey. Ten teams participated in the league.

== Regular season ==
	Club	GP	W	T	L	Goals	Pts
1.	Polis Akademisi ve Koleji	18	18	0	0	310:32	36
2.	Anka Spor Kulübü	18	15	0	3	295:64	30
3.	İzmit Büyüksehir BSK	18	14	0	4	240:69	28
4.	İstanbul Paten Spor Kulübü	18	13	0	5	237:79	26
5.	Şampiyon Ankara	18	9	0	9	130:125	18
6.	Büyükşehir Belediyesi Ankara Spor Kulübü	18	7	0	11	105:129	14
7.	Istanbul TED Kolejliler	18	7	0	11	79:213	14
8.	Ankara TED Kolejliler	18	4	0	14	104:151	8
9.	Antalya Akdeniz Kolejliler	18	1	0	17	55:429	2
10.	İzmir Şirintepe SK	18	1	0	17	65:329	2

== Playoffs ==
=== Semifinals ===
- Anka Spor Kulübü - İzmit Büyüksehir BSK 4:11
- Polis Akademisi ve Koleji - İstanbul Paten Spor Kulübü 8:4

=== 3rd place ===
- Anka Spor Kulübü - İstanbul Paten Spor Kulübü 5:8

=== Final ===
- Polis Akademisi ve Koleji - İzmit Büyüksehir BSK 7:3
