= 2012–13 TBHSL season =

The 2012–13 Turkish Ice Hockey Super League season was the 21st season of the Turkish Ice Hockey Super League, the top level of ice hockey in Turkey. 7 teams participated in the league, and Başkent Yıldızları Spor Kulübü won the championship.

== Regular season ==
	Club	GP	W	OTW	OTL	L	Goals	Pts
1.	Başkent Yıldızları SK	12	12	0	0	0	189:38	36
2.	Izmir BB GSK	12	10	0	0	2	205:39	30
3.	Kocaeli B.B. Kağıt SK	12	7	0	0	5	143:59	21
4.	Erzurum Gençlik SK	12	5	0	1	6	91:124	16
5.	Truva Ankara	12	4	1	0	7	71:88	14
6.	B.B. Ankara SK	12	3	0	0	9	45:152	9
7.	Istanbul Paten K	12	0	0	0	12	18:262	-3

== Playoffs ==
	Club	GP	W	OTW	OTL	L	Goals	Points
1.	Başkent Yıldızları SK	12	10	0	0	2	141:48	30
2.	Izmir BB GSK	12	9	0	0	3	162:53	27
3.	Kocaeli B.B. Kağıt SK	12	4	0	0	8	66:89	12
4.	Erzurum Gençlik SK	12	1	0	0	11	32:211	3
