= 2010–11 TBHSL season =

The 2010–11 Turkish Ice Hockey Super League season was the 19th season of the Turkish Ice Hockey Super League, the top level of ice hockey in Turkey. Six teams participated in the league.

== Qualification round ==
	Club	GP	W	T	L	Goals	Pts
1.	B.B. Ankara SK	2	2	0	0	27:8	6
2.	Bogazici Paten SK	2	1	0	1	20:7	3
3.	Kocaeli Sirintepe SK	2	0	0	2	4:36	0

== Final round ==
	Club	GP	W	OTW	OTL	L	Goals	Pts
1.	Başkent Yıldızları SK	9	7	1	1	0	144:33	24
2.	Kocaeli B.B. Kağıt SK	9	6	1	1	1	101:33	21
3.	Ankara Üniversitesi SK	9	2	0	0	7	39:131	6
4.	B.B. Ankara SK	9	1	0	0	8	28:115	3
