= 2000–01 TBHSL season =

The 2000–01 Turkish Ice Hockey Super League season was the ninth season of the Turkish Ice Hockey Super League, the top level of ice hockey in Turkey. 10 teams participated in the league.

== Regular season ==
| | Club | GP | W | T | L | Goals | Pts |
|---|---|---|---|---|---|---|---|
| 1. | Büyükşehir Belediyesi Ankara Spor Kulübü | 18 | 16 | 1 | 1 | 358:21 | 33 |
| 2. | İstanbul Paten Spor Kulübü | 18 | 16 | 0 | 2 | 247:64 | 32 |
| 3. | Polis Akademisi ve Koleji | 18 | 15 | 1 | 2 | 297:66 | 31 |
| 4. | Bogazici PSK Istanbul | 18 | 12 | 0 | 6 | 215:87 | 24 |
| 5. | TED Ankara Kolejliler Spor Kulübü | 18 | 9 | 0 | 9 | 164:146 | 18 |
| 6. | BELPA Ankara | 18 | 9 | 0 | 9 | 94:138 | 18 |
| 7. | İzmit Büyüksehir BSK | 18 | 4 | 0 | 14 | 95:274 | 8 |
| 8. | Antalya Akdeniz | 18 | 4 | 0 | 14 | 116:363 | 8 |
| 9. | Izmir Büyüksehir BSK | 18 | 3 | 1 | 14 | 64:181 | 7 |
| 10. | Gümüş Patenler | 18 | 0 | 1 | 17 | 45:359 | 1 |

== Playoffs ==
=== Semifinals ===
- Büyükşehir Belediyesi Ankara Spor Kulübü - Bogazici PSK Istanbul 9:0
- İstanbul Paten Spor Kulübü - Polis Akademisi ve Koleji 5:6

=== 3rd place ===
- İstanbul Paten Spor Kulübü - Bogazici PSK Istanbul 8:5

=== Final ===
- Büyükşehir Belediyesi Ankara Spor Kulübü - Polis Akademisi ve Koleji 3:4
