= 1997–98 TBHSL season =

The 1997–98 Turkish Ice Hockey Super League season was the sixth season of the Turkish Ice Hockey Super League, the top level of ice hockey in Turkey. Seven teams participated in the league.

== Standings ==
	Club	GP	W	T	L	Pts
1.	İstanbul Paten Spor Kulübü	12	11	0	1	22
2.	Büyükşehir Belediyesi Ankara Spor Kulübü	12	10	0	2	20
3.	Gümüş Patenler	12	8	0	4	16
4.	Kolejliler Ankara	12	4	1	7	9
5.	Istanbul Tarabya	12	4	1	7	9
6.	Izmir Büyüksehir BSK	12	2	0	10	4
7.	Polis Akademisi ve Koleji	12	1	0	11	2
