= 2003–04 TBHSL season =

The 2003–04 Turkish Ice Hockey Super League season was the 12th season of the Turkish Ice Hockey Super League, the top level of ice hockey in Turkey. Four teams participated in the league playoffs.

== Playoffs ==
=== 3rd place ===
- Büyükşehir Belediyesi Ankara Spor Kulübü - İstanbul Paten Spor Kulübü 5:0 (Forfeit)

=== Final ===
- Polis Akademisi ve Koleji - İzmit Büyüksehir BSK 8:2
