= 1999–2000 TBHSL season =

The 1999–00 Turkish Ice Hockey Super League season was the eighth season of the Turkish Ice Hockey Super League, the top level of ice hockey in Turkey. Eight teams participated in the league.

== Regular season ==
	Club	GP	W	T	L	Goals	Pts
1.	İstanbul Paten Spor Kulübü	14	12	1	1	219:46	25
2.	Bogazici PSK Istanbul	14	12	0	2	112:25	24
3.	Büyükşehir Belediyesi Ankara Spor Kulübü	14	10	1	3	203:33	21
4.	Gümüş Patenler	14	9	0	5	130:55	18
5.	TED Ankara KSK	14	5	0	9	111:89	10
6.	Polis Akademisi SK	14	5	0	9	41:179	10
7.	Izmir Büyüksehir BSK	14	3	0	11	36:165	6
8.	Istanbul Tarabya	14	0	0	14	27:287	0

== Playoffs ==
=== Semifinals ===
- Büyükşehir Belediyesi Ankara Spor Kulübü - Bogazici PSK Istanbul 1:0
- İstanbul Paten Spor Kulübü - Gümüş Patenler 10:1

=== 3rd place ===
- Bogazici PSK Istanbul - Gümüş Patenler 2:4

=== Final ===
- İstanbul Paten Spor Kulübü - Büyükşehir Belediyesi Ankara Spor Kulübü 4:8
