= 1993–94 TBHSL season =

The 1993–94 Turkish Ice Hockey Super League season was the second season of the Turkish Ice Hockey Super League, the top level of ice hockey in Turkey. Six teams participated in the league.

== Standings ==
	Club	GP	W	T	L	Goals	Pts
1.	Büyükşehir Belediyesi Ankara Spor Kulübü	5	5	0	0	77:13	10
2.	Emniyet Spor Kulübü	5	3	1	1	41:18	7
3.	Ankara Paten Spor Kulübü	5	2	1	2	39:23	5
4.	Yükselis Spor Kulübü	5	2	0	3	40:37	4
5.	İstanbul Paten Spor Kulübü	5	2	0	3	31:28	4
6.	Tarabya Paten Kulübü	5	0	0	5	6:115	0
