= Yükseliş Sports Club =

Turkish Ice Hockey Club

- City: Ankara, Turkey
- League: Turkish Ice Hockey First League (TBHSL); Turkish Ice Hockey Women's League (TBHBL)
- Founded: 2007
- Home arena: Ankara Ice Palace (Capacity 1,050)
- Colours
- General manager: (Turkey) İbrahim Oğuz
- Head coach: (Turkey) İbrahim Oğuz

The sports club Yükseliş Sports Club (Yükseliş SK) is a professional men's and women's, young and PW ice hockey teams from Ankara, Turkey, the men participate in the Turkish Ice Hockey First League (TIHFL) and the women in the Turkish Ice Hockey Women's League, Turkish Young's Ice Hockey League and Turkish PW Ice Hockey Tournament. The teams play out of the Ankara Ice Palace. The colors orange navy and white.

== History ==
Yükseliş Sports Club was founded in 2007. Play-off matches in the 2011–2012 season, Yükseliş Sports Club was third in Turkey.
