= 2002–03 TBHSL season =

The 2002–03 Turkish Ice Hockey Super League season was the 11th season of the Turkish Ice Hockey Super League, the top level of ice hockey in Turkey. Five teams participated in the league.

== Standings ==
| | Club | GP | W | T | L | Goals | Pts |
|---|---|---|---|---|---|---|---|
| 1. | Büyükşehir Belediyesi Ankara Spor Kulübü | 16 | 16 | 0 | 0 | 195:70 | 32 |
| 2. | Polis Akademisi ve Koleji | 16 | 11 | 1 | 4 | 146:46 | 23 |
| 3. | İzmit Büyüksehir BSK | 16 | 7 | 1 | 8 | 94:95 | 15 |
| 4. | Bogazici PSK Istanbul | 16 | 3 | 1 | 12 | 35:91 | 7 |
| 5. | Izmir Büyüksehir BSK | 16 | 1 | 0 | 15 | 45:213 | 2 |
