= 2001–02 TBHSL season =

The 2001–02 Turkish Ice Hockey Super League season was the 10th season of the Turkish Ice Hockey Super League, the top level of ice hockey in Turkey. Nine teams participated in the league.

== Regular season ==
	Club	GP	W	T	L	Goals	Pts
1.	Büyükşehir Belediyesi Ankara Spor Kulübü	16	16	0	0	484:33	32
2.	Polis Akademisi ve Koleji	16	14	0	2	341:23	28
3.	Bogazici PSK Istanbul	16	10	1	5	236:57	21
4.	Izmir Büyüksehir BSK	16	10	0	6	148:112	20
5.	İzmit Büyüksehir BSK	16	9	1	6	261:104	19
6.	Antalya Akdeniz Kolejliler	16	5	0	11	95:231	10
7.	Başkent Yıldızları Buz Pateni	16	4	0	12	61:195	8
8.	Izmit Sirintepe SK	16	2	1	13	26:322	5
9.	TED Istanbul Kolejliler SK	16	0	1	15	21:486	1

== Playoffs ==
=== Semifinals ===
- Polis Akademisi ve Koleji - Bogazici PSK Istanbul 6:0
- Büyükşehir Belediyesi Ankara Spor Kulübü - Izmir Büyüksehir BSK 6:5

=== 3rd place ===
- Izmir Büyüksehir BSK - Bogazici PSK Istanbul 3:2

=== Final ===
- Polis Akademisi ve Koleji - Büyükşehir Belediyesi Ankara Spor Kulübü 1:5
