= 1998–99 TBHSL season =

The 1998–99 Turkish Ice Hockey Super League season was the seventh season of the Turkish Ice Hockey Super League, the top level of ice hockey in Turkey. Eight teams participated in the league.

== Regular season ==
	Club	GP	Goals	Pts
1.	Gümüş Patenler	14	237:13	27
2.	Büyükşehir Belediyesi Ankara Spor Kulübü	14	235:17	25
3.	İstanbul Paten Spor Kulübü	14	181:30	20
4.	Bogazici PSK Ankara	14	58:89	14
5.	Kolejliler Ankara	14	57:116	10
6.	Izmir Büyüksehir BSK	14	47:143	9
7.	Tarabya PSK Istanbul	14	32:242	5
8.	Polis Akademisi SK Ankara	14	24:221	1

== Playoffs ==
=== Semifinals ===
- Gümüş Patenler - Bogazici PSK Ankara 3:1
- Büyükşehir Belediyesi Ankara Spor Kulübü - İstanbul Paten Spor Kulübü 0:7

=== 3rd place ===
- Büyükşehir Belediyesi Ankara Spor Kulübü - Bogazici PSK Ankara 5:2

=== Final ===
- Gümüş Patenler - İstanbul Paten Spor Kulübü 4:3 OT
