= Büyükşehir Belediyesi =

Büyükşehir Belediyesi Spor Kulübü (literally Metropolitan Municipality Sports Club), or just Büyükşehir Belediyespor may refer to:

- Antalya Büyükşehir Belediyesi, Sports Club most notable for its men's basketball team
- Gaziantep Büyükşehir Belediyespor, Sports Club most notable for its men's association football team
- İstanbul Büyükşehir Belediyesi S.K., Sports Club of Istanbul Municipality
- Kocaeli Büyükşehir Belediyesi Kağıt Spor Kulübü
  - Kocaeli Büyükşehir Belediyesi Kağıt S.K. Men's Ice Hockey
- Mersin BB, Sports Club most notable for its men's basketball team
  - Mersin Büyükşehir Belediyesi S.K. Women's Basketball, article for women team
