= Turkish Ice Hockey First League =

- Sport: Ice hockey
- Founded: 2005
- No. of teams: 6
- Country: Turkey
- Most recent champion: ABBA
- Promotion to: Turkish Ice Hockey Super League
- Official website: tbhf.org.tr

The Turkish Ice Hockey First League (Turkish: Türkiye Buz Hokeyi 1. Ligi) is the second highest level of ice hockey in Turkey, after the Turkish Ice Hockey Super League. It is operated under the jurisdiction of the Turkish Ice Hockey Federation, a member of the International Ice Hockey Federation.

== 2007-08 First League Clubs ==
The clubs to play in the 2007–2008 season are listed below, alongside their home towns.

Club	Home town	Arena	Founded	Last season
ABBA Spor Kulübü	Ankara	Bel-Pa	2005	
Ankara Emniyet Spor Kulübü	Ankara	Bel-Pa	1990	2nd
Ankara Üniversitesi Spor Kulübü	Ankara	Bel-Pa	1948	
İzmit Şirintepe Spor Kulübü	Izmit	Kocaeli	2000	
ODTÜ Spor Kulübü	Ankara	Bel-Pa	1962	4th
Truva Paten Spor Kulübü	Istanbul	Galleria	2005	5th

== Champions ==
Season	Champion	Runner up
2013–2014	Koç University Sk	Buz Korsanlari
2007–2008	ABBA	İzmit Şirintepe
2006–2007	İstanbul TED Kolejliler	Ankara Emniyet
2005–2006	Başkent Yıldızları	

== See also ==
- Turkish Ice Hockey Super League
- Turkey national men's ice hockey team
- List of ice hockey leagues
