= 1996–97 TBHSL season =

The 1996–97 Turkish Ice Hockey Super League season was the fifth season of the Turkish Ice Hockey Super League, the top level of ice hockey in Turkey. Six teams participated in the league.

== Standings ==
	Club	GP	Goals	Pts
1.	Büyükşehir Belediyesi Ankara Spor Kulübü	10	223:32	18
2.	İstanbul Paten Spor Kulübü	10	180:27	18
3.	Kavaklıdere Belediyesi Ankara	10	84:91	8
4.	Kolejliler Ankara	10	33:118	7
5.	Emniyet Spor Kulübü	10	47:124	6
6.	Istanbul Tarabya	10	30:205	3
