= 1992–93 TBHSL season =

The 1992–93 Turkish Ice Hockey Super League season was the first season of the Turkish Ice Hockey Super League, the top level of ice hockey in Turkey. Six teams participated in the league.

== Standings ==
| | Club | GP | W | T | L | Goals | Pts |
|---|---|---|---|---|---|---|---|
| 1. | Büyükşehir Belediyesi Ankara Spor Kulübü | 5 | 5 | 0 | 0 | 51:10 | 10 |
| 2. | Mülkiye Spor Kulübü | 5 | 4 | 0 | 1 | 35:24 | 8 |
| 3. | Emniyet Spor Kulübü | 5 | 3 | 0 | 2 | 21:29 | 6 |
| 4. | Yükselis Spor Kulübü | 5 | 1 | 0 | 4 | 24:30 | 2 |
| 5. | İstanbul Paten Spor Kulübü | 5 | 1 | 0 | 4 | 21:38 | 2 |
| 6. | Ankara Paten Spor Kulübü | 5 | 1 | 0 | 4 | 21:42 | 2 |
