= 1994–95 TBHSL season =

The 1994–95 Turkish Ice Hockey Super League season was the third season of the Turkish Ice Hockey Super League, the top level of ice hockey in Turkey. Five teams participated in the league.

== Standings ==
	Club	GP	W	T	L	Goals	Pts
1.	Büyükşehir Belediyesi Ankara Spor Kulübü	8	8	0	0	159:22	16
2.	Emniyet Spor Kulübü	8	6	0	2	80:63	12
3.	Kolejliler Ankara	8	3	0	5	58:76	6
4.	İstanbul Paten Spor Kulübü	8	2	0	6	42:105	4
5.	Ankara Paten Spor Kulübü	8	1	0	7	35:108	2
