= 1998–99 IIHF Continental Cup =

The Continental Cup 1998–99 was the second edition of the IIHF Continental Cup. The season started on September 18, 1998, and finished on December 29, 1998.

The tournament was won by HC Ambrì-Piotta, who won the final group.

== Preliminary round ==
=== Group A ===
(Lyon, France)

Team #1	Score	Team #2
Frisk Tigers (Norway)	25:1	(Belgium) Chiefs Leuven
Lyon HC (France)	5:2	(Denmark) Esbjerg IK
Frisk Tigers (Norway)	5:0	(Denmark) Esbjerg IK
Lyon HC (France)	15:1	(Belgium) Chiefs Leuven
Esbjerg IK (Denmark)	18:0	(Belgium) Chiefs Leuven
Lyon HC (France)	4:4	(Norway) Frisk Tigers

=== Group A standings ===
Rank	Team	Points	DIF
1	(Norway) Frisk Tigers	5	+29
2	(France) Lyon HC	5	+17
3	(Denmark) Esbjerg IK	2	
4	(Belgium) Chiefs Leuven	0	

=== Group B ===
(Jaca, Spain)

Team #1	Score	Team #2
HK Dukla Trenčín (Slovakia)	9:1	(Lithuania) SC Energija
CH Jaca (Spain)	6:1	(Spain) CG Puigcerdà
HK Dukla Trenčín (Slovakia)	26:1	(Spain) CG Puigcerdà
CH Jaca (Spain)	3:2	(Lithuania) SC Energija
SC Energija (Lithuania)	5:0	(Spain) CG Puigcerdà
CH Jaca (Spain)	1:20	(Slovakia) HK Dukla Trenčín

=== Group B standings ===
Rank	Team	Points
1	(Slovakia) HK Dukla Trenčín	6
2	(Spain) CH Jaca	4
3	(Lithuania) SC Energija	2
4	(Spain) CG Puigcerdà	0

=== Group C ===
(Novi Sad, Yugoslavia)

Team #1	Score	Team #2
HC Berkut-Kiev (Ukraine)	9:1	(Estonia) Tartu Välk 494
HK Vojvodina (Federal Republic of Yugoslavia)	3:0	(Federal Republic of Yugoslavia) KHK Crvena zvezda
KHK Crvena zvezda (Federal Republic of Yugoslavia)	0:9	(Ukraine) HC Berkut-Kiev
HK Vojvodina (Federal Republic of Yugoslavia)	2:6	(Estonia) Tartu Välk 494
KHK Crvena zvezda (Federal Republic of Yugoslavia)	3:9	(Estonia) Tartu Välk 494
HK Vojvodina (Federal Republic of Yugoslavia)	4:9	(Ukraine) HC Berkut-Kiev

=== Group C standings ===
Rank	Team	Points
1	(Ukraine) HC Berkut-Kiev	6
2	(Estonia) Tartu Välk 494	4
3	(Federal Republic of Yugoslavia) HK Vojvodina	2
4	(Federal Republic of Yugoslavia) KHK Crvena zvezda	0

=== Group D ===
(Nowy Targ, Poland)

Team #1	Score	Team #2
Podhale Nowy Targ (Poland)	6:2	(Hungary) Alba Volán Székesfehérvár
Alba Volán Székesfehérvár (Hungary)	6:3	(Slovenia) HK Sportina Bled
Podhale Nowy Targ (Poland)	11:0	(Slovenia) HK Sportina Bled

=== Group D standings ===
Rank	Team	Points
1	(Poland) Podhale Nowy Targ	4
2	(Hungary) Alba Volán Székesfehérvár	2
3	(Slovenia) HK Sportina Bled	0

=== Group E ===
(Bucharest, Romania)

Team #1	Score	Team #2
Akademika Sofia (Bulgaria)	2:1	(Croatia) KHL Mladost
HC Steaua București (Romania)	13:1	(Turkey) İstanbul Paten SK
İstanbul Paten SK (Turkey)	4:3	(Croatia) KHL Mladost
HC Steaua București (Romania)	9:0	(Bulgaria) Akademika Sofia
İstanbul Paten SK (Turkey)	5:3	(Bulgaria) Akademika Sofia
HC Steaua București (Romania)	15:0	(Croatia) KHL Mladost

=== Group E standings ===
Rank	Team	Points
1	(Romania) HC Steaua București	6
2	(Turkey) İstanbul Paten SK	4
3	(Bulgaria) Akademika Sofia	2
4	(Croatia) KHL Mladost	0

=== Group F ===
(Miercurea Ciuc, Romania)

Team #1	Score	Team #2
HC Slavia Sofia (Bulgaria)	5:1	(Israel) Maccabi Amos Lod
SC Miercurea Ciuc (Romania)	32:0	(Turkey) Ankara Büyükşehir
HC Slavia Sofia (Bulgaria)	8:1	(Turkey) Ankara Büyükşehir
SC Miercurea Ciuc (Romania)	8:1	(Israel) Maccabi Amos Lod
Maccabi Amos Lod (Israel)	5:0	(Turkey) Ankara Büyükşehir
SC Miercurea Ciuc (Romania)	12:2	(Bulgaria) HC Slavia Sofia

=== Group F standings ===
Rank	Team	Points
1	(Romania) SC Miercurea Ciuc	6
2	(Bulgaria) HC Slavia Sofia	4
3	(Israel) Maccabi Amos Lod	2
4	(Turkey) Ankara Büyükşehir	0

== First Group Stage ==
=== Group G ===
(Amiens, France)

Team #1	Score	Team #2
Storhamar Dragons (Norway)	6:4	(Netherlands) Agio Huys Tigers Nijmegen
Gothiques d'Amiens (France)	4:2	(Norway) Frisk Tigers
Storhamar Dragons (Norway)	3:2	(Norway) Frisk Tigers
Gothiques d'Amiens (France)	6:1	(Netherlands) Agio Huys Tigers Nijmegen
Frisk Tigers (Norway)	7:2	(Netherlands) Agio Huys Tigers Nijmegen
Gothiques d'Amiens (France)	3:4	(Norway) Storhamar Dragons

=== Group G standings ===
Rank	Team	Points
1	(Norway) Storhamar Dragons	6
2	(France) Gothiques d'Amiens	4
3	(Norway) Frisk Tigers	2
4	(Netherlands) Agio Huys Tigers Nijmegen	0

=== Group H ===
(Poprad, Slovakia)

Team #1	Score	Team #2
HK Dukla Trenčín (Slovakia)	6:0	(Latvia) HK Liepājas Metalurgs
ŠKP Poprad (Slovakia)	4:2	(Denmark) Herning Blue Fox
HK Dukla Trenčín (Slovakia)	5:2	(Denmark) Herning Blue Fox
ŠKP Poprad (Slovakia)	5:2	(Latvia) HK Liepājas Metalurgs
Herning Blue Fox (Denmark)	4:1	(Latvia) HK Liepājas Metalurgs
ŠKP Poprad (Slovakia)	1:5	(Slovakia) HK Dukla Trenčín

=== Group H standings ===
Rank	Team	Points
1	(Slovakia) HK Dukla Trenčín	6
2	(Slovakia) ŠKP Poprad	4
3	(Denmark) Herning Blue Fox	2
4	(Latvia) HK Liepājas Metalurgs	0

=== Group J ===
(Novopolotsk, Belarus)

Team #1	Score	Team #2
Sokil Kiev (Ukraine)	8:1	(Estonia) Narva Kreenholm
Polymir Novopolotsk (Belarus)	6:2	(Ukraine) HC Berkut-Kiev
Sokil Kiev (Ukraine)	6:0	(Ukraine) HC Berkut-Kiev
Polymir Novopolotsk (Belarus)	14:1	(Estonia) Narva Kreenholm
HC Berkut-Kiev (Ukraine)	11:2	(Estonia) Narva Kreenholm
Polymir Novopolotsk (Belarus)	5:3	(Ukraine) Sokil Kiev

=== Group J standings ===
Rank	Team	Points
1	(Belarus) Polymir Novopolotsk	6
2	(Ukraine) Sokil Kiev	4
3	(Ukraine) HC Berkut-Kiev	2
4	(Estonia) Narva Kreenholm	0

=== Group K ===
(Cardiff, United Kingdom)

Team #1	Score	Team #2
Podhale Nowy Targ (Poland)	5:0	(Hungary) Dunaferr SE
Cardiff Devils (United Kingdom)	2:3	(Slovenia) HDD Olimpija Ljubljana
HDD Olimpija Ljubljana (Slovenia)	5:2	(Poland) Podhale Nowy Targ
Cardiff Devils (United Kingdom)	2:4	(Hungary) Dunaferr SE
HDD Olimpija Ljubljana (Slovenia)	2:2	(Hungary) Dunaferr SE
Cardiff Devils (United Kingdom)	5:3	(Poland) Podhale Nowy Targ

=== Group K standings ===
Rank	Team	Points
1	(Slovenia) HDD Olimpija Ljubljana	5
2	(Hungary) Dunaferr SE	3
3	(United Kingdom) Cardiff Devils	2
4	(Poland) Podhale Nowy Targ	2

=== Group L ===
(Oświęcim, Poland)

Team #1	Score	Team #2
KHL Medveščak (Croatia)	5:3	(Romania) HC Steaua București
KS Unia Oświęcim (Poland)	6:1	(Romania) SC Miercurea Ciuc
SC Miercurea Ciuc (Romania)	6:5	(Croatia) KHL Medveščak
KS Unia Oświęcim (Poland)	6:1	(Romania) HC Steaua București
HC Steaua București (Romania)	9:2	(Romania) SC Miercurea Ciuc
KS Unia Oświęcim (Poland)	11:0	(Croatia) KHL Medveščak

=== Group L standings ===
Rank	Team	Points
1	(Poland) KS Unia Oświęcim	6
2	(Romania) HC Steaua București	2
3	(Croatia) KHL Medveščak	2
4	(Romania) SC Miercurea Ciuc	2

=== Group M ===
(Omsk, Russia)

Team #1	Score	Team #2
Kazzinc-Torpedo (Kazakhstan)	4:4	(United Kingdom) Sheffield Steelers
Avangard Omsk (Russia)	2:2	(Russia) Lada Togliatti
Lada Togliatti (Russia)	6:3	(Kazakhstan) Kazzinc-Torpedo
Avangard Omsk (Russia)	5:1	(United Kingdom) Sheffield Steelers
Lada Togliatti (Russia)	3:1	(United Kingdom) Sheffield Steelers
Avangard Omsk (Russia)	2:0	(Kazakhstan) Kazzinc-Torpedo

=== Group M standings ===
Rank	Team	Points	DIF
1	(Russia) Avangard Omsk	5	+6
2	(Russia) Lada Togliatti	5	+5
3	(Kazakhstan) Kazzinc-Torpedo	1	
4	(United Kingdom) Sheffield Steelers	1	

(Germany) Düsseldorfer EG, (Czech Republic) HC Liberec, (Austria) EHC Graz (Switzerland) HC Ambrì-Piotta, (Russia) Torpedo Yaroslavl, (Belarus) HK Neman Grodno : bye

== Second Group Stage ==
=== Group N ===
(Düsseldorf, Germany)

Team #1	Score	Team #2
HK Dukla Trenčín (Slovakia)	2:1	(Norway) Storhamar Dragons
Düsseldorfer EG (Germany)	4:4	(Czech Republic) HC Liberec
HK Dukla Trenčín (Slovakia)	6:3	(Czech Republic) HC Liberec
Düsseldorfer EG (Germany)	7:4	(Norway) Storhamar Dragons
Storhamar Dragons (Norway)	6:2	(Czech Republic) HC Liberec
Düsseldorfer EG (Germany)	3:1	(Slovakia) HK Dukla Trenčín

=== Group N standings ===
Rank	Team	Points
1	(Germany) Düsseldorfer EG	5
2	(Slovakia) HK Dukla Trenčín	4
3	(Norway) Storhamar Dragons	2
4	(Czech Republic) HC Liberec	1

=== Group O ===
(Ambri, Switzerland)

Team #1	Score	Team #2
HDD Olimpija Ljubljana (Slovenia)	5:1	(Poland) KS Unia Oświęcim
HC Ambrì-Piotta (Switzerland)	2:0	(Austria) EHC Graz
KS Unia Oświęcim (Poland)	5:1	(Austria) EHC Graz
HC Ambrì-Piotta (Switzerland)	6:5	(Slovenia) HDD Olimpija Ljubljana
HDD Olimpija Ljubljana (Slovenia)	5:2	(Austria) EHC Graz
HC Ambrì-Piotta (Switzerland)	3:1	(Poland) KS Unia Oświęcim

=== Group O standings ===
Rank	Team	Points
1	(Switzerland) HC Ambrì-Piotta	6
2	(Slovenia) HDD Olimpija Ljubljana	4
3	(Poland) KS Unia Oświęcim	2
4	(Austria) EHC Graz	0

=== Group P ===
(Yaroslavl, Russia)

Team #1	Score	Team #2
Avangard Omsk (Russia)	5:2	(Belarus) HK Neman Grodno
Torpedo Yaroslavl (Russia)	10:0	(Belarus) Polymir Novopolotsk
Avangard Omsk (Russia)	3:2	(Belarus) Polymir Novopolotsk
Torpedo Yaroslavl (Russia)	3:0	(Belarus) HK Neman Grodno
Polymir Novopolotsk (Belarus)	1:0	(Belarus) HK Neman Grodno
Torpedo Yaroslavl (Russia)	0:4	(Russia) Avangard Omsk

=== Group P standings ===
Rank	Team	Points
1	(Russia) Avangard Omsk	6
2	(Russia) Torpedo Yaroslavl	4
3	(Belarus) Polymir Novopolotsk	2
4	(Belarus) HK Neman Grodno	0

(Slovakia) HC Košice : bye

== Final Group Stage ==
(Košice, Slovakia)

Team #1	Score	Team #2
HC Ambrì-Piotta (Switzerland)	6:4	(Germany) Düsseldorfer EG
HC Košice (Slovakia)	2:3	(Russia) Avangard Omsk
HC Ambrì-Piotta (Switzerland)	5:3	(Russia) Avangard Omsk
HC Košice (Slovakia)	5:0	(Germany) Düsseldorfer EG
Avangard Omsk (Russia)	4:1	(Germany) Düsseldorfer EG
HC Košice (Slovakia)	2:1	(Switzerland) HC Ambrì-Piotta

=== Final Group standings ===
Rank	Team	Points	
1	(Switzerland) HC Ambrì-Piotta	4	(GF:6;GA:5)
2	(Slovakia) HC Košice	4	(GF:4;GA:4)
3	(Russia) Avangard Omsk	4	(GF:6;GA:7)
4	(Germany) Düsseldorfer EG	0	
