= 1995–96 TBHSL season =

The 1995–96 Turkish Ice Hockey Super League season was the fourth season of the Turkish Ice Hockey Super League, the top level of ice hockey in Turkey. Five teams participated in the league.

== Standings ==
	Club	GP	W	T	L	Goals	Pts
1.	Kavaklıdere Belediyesi Ankara	8	8	0	0	128:34	16
2.	İstanbul Paten Spor Kulübü	8	5	0	3	83:38	10
3.	BSK Ankara	8	4	0	4	77:79	8
4.	Kolejliler Ankara	8	3	0	5	62:85	6
5.	Istanbul Tarabya	8	0	0	8	27:141	0
