= 2001–02 IIHF Continental Cup =

The Continental Cup 2001–02 was the fifth edition of the IIHF Continental Cup. The season started on September 21, 2001, and finished on February 13, 2002.

The tournament was won by ZSC Lions, who beat HC Milano Vipers in the final.

== Preliminary round ==
=== Group A ===
(Ankara, Turkey)

Team #1	Score	Team #2
Kazzinc-Torpedo (Kazakhstan)	28:0	(Federal Republic of Yugoslavia) HK Partizan
Polis Akademisi (Turkey)	3:0	(Romania) Progym Gheorgheni
Kazzinc-Torpedo (Kazakhstan)	6:1	(Romania) Progym Gheorgheni
Polis Akademisi (Turkey)	5:2	(Federal Republic of Yugoslavia) HK Partizan
Progym Gheorgheni (Romania)	12:1	(Federal Republic of Yugoslavia) HK Partizan
Polis Akademisi (Turkey)	1:11	(Kazakhstan) Kazzinc-Torpedo

=== Group A standings ===
Rank	Team	Points
1	(Kazakhstan) Kazzinc-Torpedo	6
2	(Turkey) Polis Akademisi	4
3	(Romania) Progym Gheorgheni	2
4	(Federal Republic of Yugoslavia) HK Partizan	0

=== Group B ===
(Sofia, Bulgaria)

Team #1	Score	Team #2
Keramin Minsk (Belarus)	25:1	(Israel) Maccabi Lod
HC Slavia Sofia (Bulgaria)	5:7	(Turkey) Büyükşehir Belediyesi
HC Slavia Sofia (Bulgaria)	3:2	(Israel) Maccabi Lod
Keramin Minsk (Belarus)	19:0	(Turkey) Büyükşehir Belediyesi
Büyükşehir Belediyesi (Turkey)	15:5	(Israel) Maccabi Lod
HC Slavia Sofia (Bulgaria)	2:7	(Belarus) Keramin Minsk

=== Group B standings ===
Rank	Team	Points
1	(Belarus) Keramin Minsk	6
2	(Turkey) Büyükşehir Belediyesi	4
3	(Bulgaria) HC Slavia Sofia	2
4	(Israel) Maccabi Lod	0

=== Group C ===
(Bucharest, Romania)

Team #1	Score	Team #2
HC Steaua București (Romania)	5:0	(Federal Republic of Yugoslavia) HK Novi Sad
HK Slavija Ljubljana (Slovenia)	4:3	(Croatia) KHL Medveščak Zagreb
HC Steaua București (Romania)	3:6	(Croatia) KHL Medveščak Zagreb
HK Novi Sad (Federal Republic of Yugoslavia)	7:4	(Slovenia) HK Slavija Ljubljana
HC Steaua București (Romania)	1:3	(Slovenia) HK Slavija Ljubljana
HK Novi Sad (Federal Republic of Yugoslavia)	4:3	(Croatia) KHL Medveščak Zagreb

=== Group C standings ===
Rank	Team	Points	
1	(Federal Republic of Yugoslavia) HK Novi Sad	4	(GF:7;GA:4)
2	(Slovenia) HK Slavija Ljubljana	4	(GF:4;GA:7)
3	(Croatia) KHL Medveščak Zagreb	2	
4	(Romania) HC Steaua București	0	

=== Group D ===
(Dunaújváros, Hungary)

Team #1	Score	Team #2
SC Miercurea Ciuc (Romania)	6:5	(Croatia) KHL Zagreb
Dunaferr SE (Hungary)	2:3	(Slovenia) HK Acroni Jesenice
HK Acroni Jesenice (Slovenia)	6:1	(Croatia) KHL Zagreb
Dunaferr SE (Hungary)	2:1	(Romania) SC Miercurea Ciuc
HK Acroni Jesenice (Slovenia)	6:2	(Romania) SC Miercurea Ciuc
Dunaferr SE (Hungary)	7:1	(Croatia) KHL Zagreb

=== Group D standings ===
Rank	Team	Points
1	(Slovenia) HK Acroni Jesenice	6
2	(Hungary) Dunaferr SE	4
3	(Romania) SC Miercurea Ciuc	2
4	(Croatia) KHL Zagreb	0

=== Group E ===
(Font-Romeu-Odeillo-Via, France)

Team #1	Score	Team #2
Dragons de Rouen (France)	6:2	(Netherlands) Nijmegen Tigers
CG Puigcerdà (Spain)	2:11	(Latvia) HK Liepājas Metalurgs
Nijmegen Tigers (Netherlands)	4:2	(Latvia) HK Liepājas Metalurgs
CG Puigcerdà (Spain)	4:9	(France) Dragons de Rouen
CG Puigcerdà (Spain)	1:10	(Netherlands) Nijmegen Tigers
Dragons de Rouen (France)	4:2	(Latvia) HK Liepājas Metalurgs

=== Group E standings ===
Rank	Team	Points
1	(France) Dragons de Rouen	6
2	(Netherlands) Nijmegen Tigers	4
3	(Latvia) HK Liepājas Metalurgs	2
4	(Spain) CG Puigcerdà	0

=== Group F ===
(Tilburg, Netherlands)

Team #1	Score	Team #2
Diamant Trappers Tilburg (Netherlands)	3:3	(France) Brûleurs de Loups
Rødovre Mighty Bulls (Denmark)	6:1	(Spain) CH Jaca
Diamant Trappers Tilburg (Netherlands)	6:2	(Spain) CH Jaca
Rødovre Mighty Bulls (Denmark)	3:3	(France) Brûleurs de Loups
Brûleurs de Loups (France)	4:1	(Spain) CH Jaca
Diamant Trappers Tilburg (Netherlands)	2:2	(Denmark) Rødovre Mighty Bulls

=== Group F standings ===
Rank	Team	Points	
1	(France) Brûleurs de Loups	4	(GF:6;GA:6)
2	(Denmark) Rødovre Mighty Bulls	4	(GF:5;GA:5)
3	(Netherlands) Diamant Trappers Tilburg	4	(GF:5;GA:5)
4	(Spain) CH Jaca	0	

== First Group Stage ==
=== Group G ===
(Milan, Italy)

Team #1	Score	Team #2
HDD Olimpija Ljubljana (Slovenia)	5:2	(Kazakhstan) Kazzinc-Torpedo
HC Milano Vipers (Italy)	4:4	(Austria) EC KAC
HDD Olimpija Ljubljana (Slovenia)	6:5	(Austria) EC KAC
HC Milano Vipers (Italy)	3:2	(Kazakhstan) Kazzinc-Torpedo
Kazzinc-Torpedo (Kazakhstan)	8:1	(Austria) EC KAC
HC Milano Vipers (Italy)	3:1	(Slovenia) HDD Olimpija Ljubljana

=== Group G standings ===
Rank	Team	Points
1	(Italy) HC Milano Vipers	5
2	(Slovenia) HDD Olimpija Ljubljana	4
3	(Kazakhstan) Kazzinc-Torpedo	2
4	(Austria) EC KAC	1

=== Group H ===
(Székesfehérvár, Hungary)

Team #1	Score	Team #2
Keramin Minsk (Belarus)	5:3	(Ukraine) Sokil Kiev
Alba Volán Székesfehérvár (Hungary)	3:2	(Belarus) HK Neman Grodno
Sokil Kiev (Ukraine)	5:0	(Belarus) HK Neman Grodno
Alba Volán Székesfehérvár (Hungary)	3:3	(Belarus) Keramin Minsk
Alba Volán Székesfehérvár (Hungary)	1:5	(Ukraine) Sokil Kiev
Keramin Minsk (Belarus)	2:1	(Belarus) HK Neman Grodno

=== Group H standings ===
Rank	Team	Points
1	(Belarus) Keramin Minsk	5
2	(Ukraine) Sokil Kiev	4
3	(Hungary) Alba Volán Székesfehérvár	3
4	(Belarus) HK Neman Grodno	0

=== Group J ===
(Oświęcim, Poland)

Team #1	Score	Team #2
Dwory Unia Oświęcim (Poland)	4:1	(Lithuania) SC Energija
HC Senators Rosice (Czech Republic)	11:1	(Lithuania) SC Energija
Dwory Unia Oświęcim (Poland)	4:0	(Czech Republic) HC Senators Rosice

=== Group J standings * ===
Rank	Team	Points
1	(Poland) Dwory Unia Oświęcim	4
2	(Czech Republic) HC Senators Rosice	2
3	(Lithuania) SC Energija	0

* : (Federal Republic of Yugoslavia) HK Novi Sad was disqualified

=== Group K ===
(Prostějov, Czech Republic)

Team #1	Score	Team #2
GKS Katowice (Poland)	4:2	(Ukraine) HC Berkut-Kiev
HC Prostějov (Czech Republic)	3:3	(Slovenia) HK Acroni Jesenice
GKS Katowice (Poland)	5:0	(Slovenia) HK Acroni Jesenice
HC Prostějov (Czech Republic)	3:2	(Ukraine) HC Berkut-Kiev
HK Acroni Jesenice (Slovenia)	3:2	(Ukraine) HC Berkut-Kiev
HC Prostějov (Czech Republic)	4:2	(Poland) GKS Katowice

=== Group K standings ===
Rank	Team	Points
1	(Czech Republic) HC Prostějov	5
2	(Poland) GKS Katowice	4
3	(Slovenia) HK Acroni Jesenice	3
4	(Ukraine) HC Berkut-Kiev	0

=== Group L ===
(Mikkeli, Finland)

Team #1	Score	Team #2
Storhamar Dragons (Norway)	5:2	(France) Dragons de Rouen
Mikkelin Jukurit (Finland)	2:3	(Latvia) HK Riga 2000
Storhamar Dragons (Norway)	6:2	(Latvia) HK Riga 2000
Mikkelin Jukurit (Finland)	3:1	(France) Dragons de Rouen
HK Riga 2000 (Latvia)	11:3	(France) Dragons de Rouen
Mikkelin Jukurit (Finland)	5:1	(Norway) Storhamar Dragons

=== Group L standings ===
Rank	Team	Points	
1	(Finland) Mikkelin Jukurit	4	(GF:7;GA:4)
2	(Norway) Storhamar Dragons	4	(GF:7;GA:7)
3	(Latvia) HK Riga 2000	4	(GF:5;GA:8)
4	(France) Dragons de Rouen	0	

=== Group M ===
(Anglet, France)

Team #1	Score	Team #2
Sheffield Steelers (United Kingdom)	5:3	(Denmark) Herning Blue Fox
Anglet Hormadi (France)	5:2	(France) Brûleurs de Loups
Brûleurs de Loups (France)	1:4	(United Kingdom) Sheffield Steelers
Anglet Hormadi (France)	4:3	(Denmark) Herning Blue Fox
Brûleurs de Loups (France)	4:7	(Denmark) Herning Blue Fox
Anglet Hormadi (France)	4:3	(United Kingdom) Sheffield Steelers

=== Group M standings ===
Rank	Team	Points
1	(France) Anglet Hormadi	6
2	(United Kingdom) Sheffield Steelers	4
3	(Denmark) Herning Blue Fox	2
4	(France) Brûleurs de Loups	0

(Italy) AS Asiago, (Norway) Vålerenga, (Germany) ERC Ingolstadt, (United Kingdom) London Knights, (Slovakia) HKm Zvolen, (Switzerland) HC Lugano : bye

== Second Group Stage ==
=== Group N ===
(Asiago, Italy)

Team #1	Score	Team #2
HC Milano Vipers (Italy)	4:2	(Switzerland) HC Lugano
AS Asiago (Italy)	5:2	(Belarus) Keramin Minsk
HC Lugano (Switzerland)	3:1	(Belarus) Keramin Minsk
AS Asiago (Italy)	2:2	(Italy) HC Milano Vipers
HC Milano Vipers (Italy)	3:0	(Belarus) Keramin Minsk
AS Asiago (Italy)	4:4	(Switzerland) HC Lugano

=== Group N standings ===
Rank	Team	Points
1	(Italy) HC Milano Vipers	5
2	(Italy) AS Asiago	4
3	(Switzerland) HC Lugano	3
4	(Belarus) Keramin Minsk	0

=== Group O ===
(Zvolen, Slovakia)

Team #1	Score	Team #2
HKm Zvolen (Slovakia)	6:4	(Czech Republic) HC Prostějov
Dwory Unia Oświęcim (Poland)	2:1	(Germany) ERC Ingolstadt
HKm Zvolen (Slovakia)	6:4	(Poland) Dwory Unia Oświęcim
HC Prostějov (Czech Republic)	5:1	(Germany) ERC Ingolstadt
HKm Zvolen (Slovakia)	2:0	(Germany) ERC Ingolstadt
HC Prostějov (Czech Republic)	4:1	(Poland) Dwory Unia Oświęcim

=== Group O standings ===
Rank	Team	Points
1	(Slovakia) HKm Zvolen	6
2	(Czech Republic) HC Prostějov	4
3	(Poland) Dwory Unia Oświęcim	2
4	(Germany) ERC Ingolstadt	0

=== Group P ===
(Oslo, Norway)

Team #1	Score	Team #2
Mikkelin Jukurit (Finland)	5:2	(United Kingdom) London Knights
Vålerenga (Norway)	4:1	(France) Anglet Hormadi
London Knights (United Kingdom)	5:3	(France) Anglet Hormadi
Vålerenga (Norway)	2:2	(Finland) Mikkelin Jukurit
Mikkelin Jukurit (Finland)	5:1	(France) Anglet Hormadi
Vålerenga (Norway)	4:4	(United Kingdom) London Knights

=== Group P standings ===
Rank	Team	Points
1	(Finland) Mikkelin Jukurit	5
2	(Norway) Vålerenga	4
3	(United Kingdom) London Knights	3
4	(France) Anglet Hormadi	0

(Switzerland) ZSC Lions : bye

== Final stage ==
(Zürich, Switzerland)

=== Semifinals ===
Team #1	Score	Team #2
HC Milano Vipers (Italy)	4:2	(Slovakia) HKm Zvolen
ZSC Lions (Switzerland)	4:3	(Finland) Mikkelin Jukurit

=== Third place match ===
Team #1	Score	Team #2
HKm Zvolen (Slovakia)	6:3	(Finland) Mikkelin Jukurit

=== Final ===
Team #1	Score	Team #2
ZSC Lions (Switzerland) Samuelsson (Elston, Salis) 3:07 ГБ	6:1 (3:1, 2:0, 1:0)	(Italy) HC Milano Vipers
