= Turkish Ice Hockey Super League =

Professional ice hockey league in Turkey

- Current season, competition or edition: 2022–23 TBHSL season
- Sport: Ice hockey
- Founded: 1993; 33 years ago
- Founder: Turkish Ice Hockey Federation
- First season: 1992–93
- No. of teams: 5
- Country: Turkey
- Most recent champion: Buzadam GSK (Istanbul) (5th title)
- Most titles: B.B. Ankara SK (Ankara) (7 titles)
- Relegation to: Turkish Ice Hockey First League
- Related competitions: Turkish Ice Hockey First League; Turkish Women's Ice Hockey League
- Website: www.tbhf.org.tr

The Turkish Ice Hockey Super League (Turkish: Türkiye Buz Hokeyi Süper Ligi, abbreviated TBHSL) is the highest level of professional ice hockey in Turkey. It is operated under the jurisdiction of the Turkish Ice Hockey Federation, a member of the International Ice Hockey Federation. Unlike the National Hockey League, the Super League is not divided into conferences; teams compete in a single division. The league currently consists of six teams, from two cities.

The champion of the league qualifies for the first round of the IIHF Continental Cup.

== History ==
The Bel-Pa Ice Rink hosted the first match ever played in compliance with the IIHF rules and regulations, at the end of 1989 between Ankara Tarım Kredi Spor and Istanbul Paten Kulübü teams.

As of January 1990, ice hockey in Turkey was operated under the jurisdiction of the Turkish Ski Federation, and the first official championship ever was organized among two teams from Ankara and two from Istanbul. Ankara Büyükşehir Belediyesi, Istanbul Paten Kulübü, Ankara Atatürk Buz Hokeyi Takımı and İstanbul Boğaziçi Patinaj Klübü has participated to the championship and B.B. Ankara SK became the champion.

The rising interest in ice hockey effected the increasing number of players and then the teams. The Turkish Ice Hockey Federation was founded in 1991. Rino Ouellette, a Canadian diplomat in Ankara, who coached two teams consecutively, contributed much to the development of ice hockey sport in Turkey. A tournament, organized in 1992, laid the ground stone for the establishment of Turkey's first ice hockey league in 1993.

== TBHSL seasons ==
=== 2016–17 season ===
The 2016–17 league season was sponsored again by "Didi".

Standings

The 2016–17 league ended with Zeytinburnu SK leading. The first four leading teams were promoted to play semi-finals.

Place	Team	GP	W	OTW	OTL	L	GF	GA	GD	P
1	Zeytinburnu SK	10	10	0	0	0	175	13	162	30
2	Erzurum BB GSK	10	8	0	0	2	79	24	55	24
3	Gümüş Patenler SK	10	4	1	0	5	37	62	−25	14
4	Buzadam GSK	10	3	0	0	7	28	94	−66	9
5	Başkent Yıldızları BP BHSK	10	2	0	1	7	33	90	−57	7
6	Koç Üniversitesi SK	10	1	0	0	9	27	96	−69	3

2017 Playoffs

League leader played against the 4th ranked team, the runner-up against the third ranked. Zeytinburnu SK became 2016–17 league champion defeating Erzurum BB GSK by 2–0 in five final matches.

Semi-finals
February 25–26, 2017
Zeytinburnu SK	2 (45)
Buzadam GSK	0 (0)
February 25–26, 2017
Erzurum BB GSK	2 (13)
Gümüş Patenler SK	0 (3)

Finals
March 4–5, 2017
Zeytinburnu SK	2 (27)
Erzurum BB GSK	0 (3)
Third place
March 4–11, 2017
Gümüş Patenler SK	2 (19)
Buzadam GSK	1 (13)

=== 2015–16 season ===
The 2015–16 league season was sponsored by the iced tea brand "Didi" of the state-owned Turkish Tea Producers Corporation Çaykur, and named so Didi TBHSL.

Teams

The clubs played in the 2015–16 season are listed below, alongside their home towns. The leagues matches were played in two groups, the East Division and the West Divisionp.

East Division		West Division	
Club	Home town	Club	Home town
BB Ankara SK	Ankara	Buz Korsanları SK	Istanbul
Erzurum BB GSK	Erzurum	İzmir BB GSK	İzmir
Erzurum Gençlik SK	Erzurum	Koç Üniversitesi SK	Istanbul
Genç Ankaralılar SK	Ankara	Pars Buz Sporları SK	Istanbul
Gümüş Patenler SK	Ankara	Zeytinburnu SK	Istanbul

Standings

The 2015–16 league ended with İzmir BB GSK leading. The first four leading teams were promoted to play semi-finals.

Place	Team	GP	W	OTW	OTL	L	GF	GA	GD	P
1	İzmir BB GSK	10	8	1	0	1	133	20	113	26
2	Zeytinburnu SK	10	8	0	1	1	146	20	126	25
3	Erzurum BB GSK	10	7	0	0	3	94	29	65	21
4	Koç Üniversitesi SK	10	4	0	0	6	42	96	−54	12
5	Gümüş Patenler SK	8	0	0	0	8	22	132	−110	0
6	BB Ankara SK	8	0	0	0	8	15	155	−140	0

2016 Playoffs

League leader played against the 4th ranked team, the runner-up against the third ranked. Zeytinburnu SK became 2015–16 league champion defeating İzmir BB GSK by 3–2 in five final matches.

Semi-finals
April 16–17, 2016
İzmir BB GSK	2 (42)
Koç Üniversitesi SK	0 (1)
April 12–16, 2016
Zeytinburnu SK	3 (22)
Erzurum BB GSK	0 (8)

Finals
April 23–30, 2016
İzmir BB GSK	2 (26)
Zeytinburnu SK	3 (31)
Third place
April 23–24, 2016
Koç Üniversitesi SK	0 (2)
Erzurum BB GSK	2 (28)

=== 2009–10 season ===
Final standings

Place	Team	GP'	W	T	L	PTS
1	Ankara University SK	10	8	1	1	25
1	Baskent Yildizlari SK	10	8	1	1	25
3	Kocaeli BB Kagitspor	10	6	1	3	19
4	Polis Akademisi	10	4	1	5	13
5	BB Ankara SK	10	2	0	7	6
6	Izmit Sirintepe SK	10	0	0	10	0

- Kocaeli BB had to surrender three of its wins when it was discovered that a player was playing with an illegal transfer card. Therefore, for playoff standings, Kocaeli BB would take the 4th seed and Polis would take the 3rd seed.

Teams

Club	Home town	Arena	Founded	Rank
Ankara University SK	Ankara	Bel-Pa	1948	
Başkent Yıldızları	Ankara	Bel-Pa	2004	
B.B. Ankara SK	Ankara	Bel-Pa	1978	
Izmit Şirintepe SK	Izmit	Kocaeli	2000	
Kocaeli B.B. Kağıt	Izmit	Kocaeli	2000	
Polis Akademisi	Ankara	Bel-Pa	1996	

2010 Playoffs

Semi-finals; February 27, 2010
1	Ankara University	7
4	Kocaeli BB	2
2	Başkent Yıldızları	8
3	Polis Akademsi	1

Finals; February 28, 2010
1	Ankara University	7
2	Başkent Yıldızları	3

2010 All-Star Game

On March 13, 2010 the Super League All-Star Game will be held in Ankara at the Bel-Pa arena. The game will be televised on TRT and there will be a special guest appearance by Turkish Pop Star Nil Karaibrahimgil. After the game Nil Karaibrahimgil will be performing at a club in Ankara for the players and fans who attend the All-Star Game.

=== 2008–09 season ===
Teams

The clubs played in the 2008–2009 season are listed below, alongside their home towns.

Club	Home town	Arena	Founded	Rank
Başkent Yıldızları	Ankara	Bel-Pa	2004	3rd
B.B. Ankaraspor	Ankara	Bel-Pa	1978	6th
İstanbul Paten	Istanbul	Galleria	1987	4th
Kocaeli B.B. Kağıt	Izmit	Kocaeli	2000	1st
Polis Akademisi	Ankara	Bel-Pa	1996	2nd
Anka SK	Ankara	Bel-Pa	1954	5th

Season structure

In the 2008–09 regular season, each team played 10 games. The four best teams at the conclusion of regular season proceed to the play-offs where semifinals and the final are all played. Games are played over 3 rounds. Higher-ranking teams play the first match at home. Teams are paired up for each round according to regular season results. The highest-ranking team will play against the lowest-ranking and second highest against the second lowest. Team which finishes the league in last position relegates to the Turkish Ice Hockey First League.

League starts at the end of December and finishes in early May. Games are mostly played on Saturday or Sunday.

The TBHSL's points system is different from the ice hockey leagues in Europe. 3 points are awarded for a win, 1 points for tie and 0 points for a loss.

Standings

Note: GF= Goals for, GA = Goals against

Team	Games	Won	Lost	Tied	GF	GA	Points	
1	Kocaeli B.B.	10	9	1	0	149	18	27
2	Polis Akademisi	10	8	2	0	141	28	24
3	Başkent Yıldızları	10	7	3	0	110	44	21
4	Istanbul Paten	10	3	7	0	21	104	9
5	Anka SK	10	2	8	0	28	153	6
6	B.B. Ankara	10	1	9	0	23	145	3

== Ice hockey rinks ==
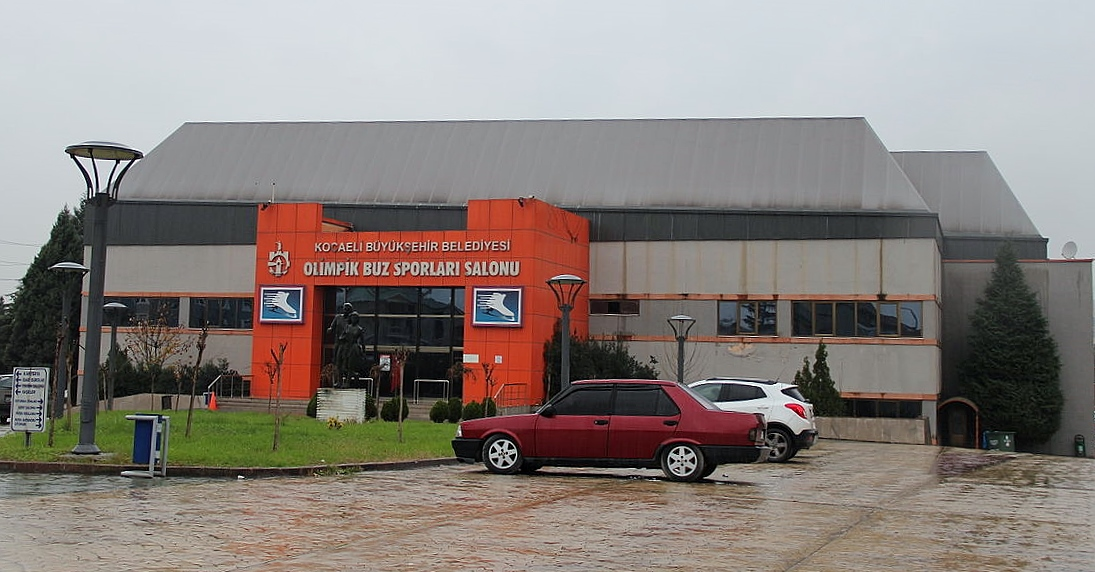
Kocaeli B.B. Ice Arena in İzmit.

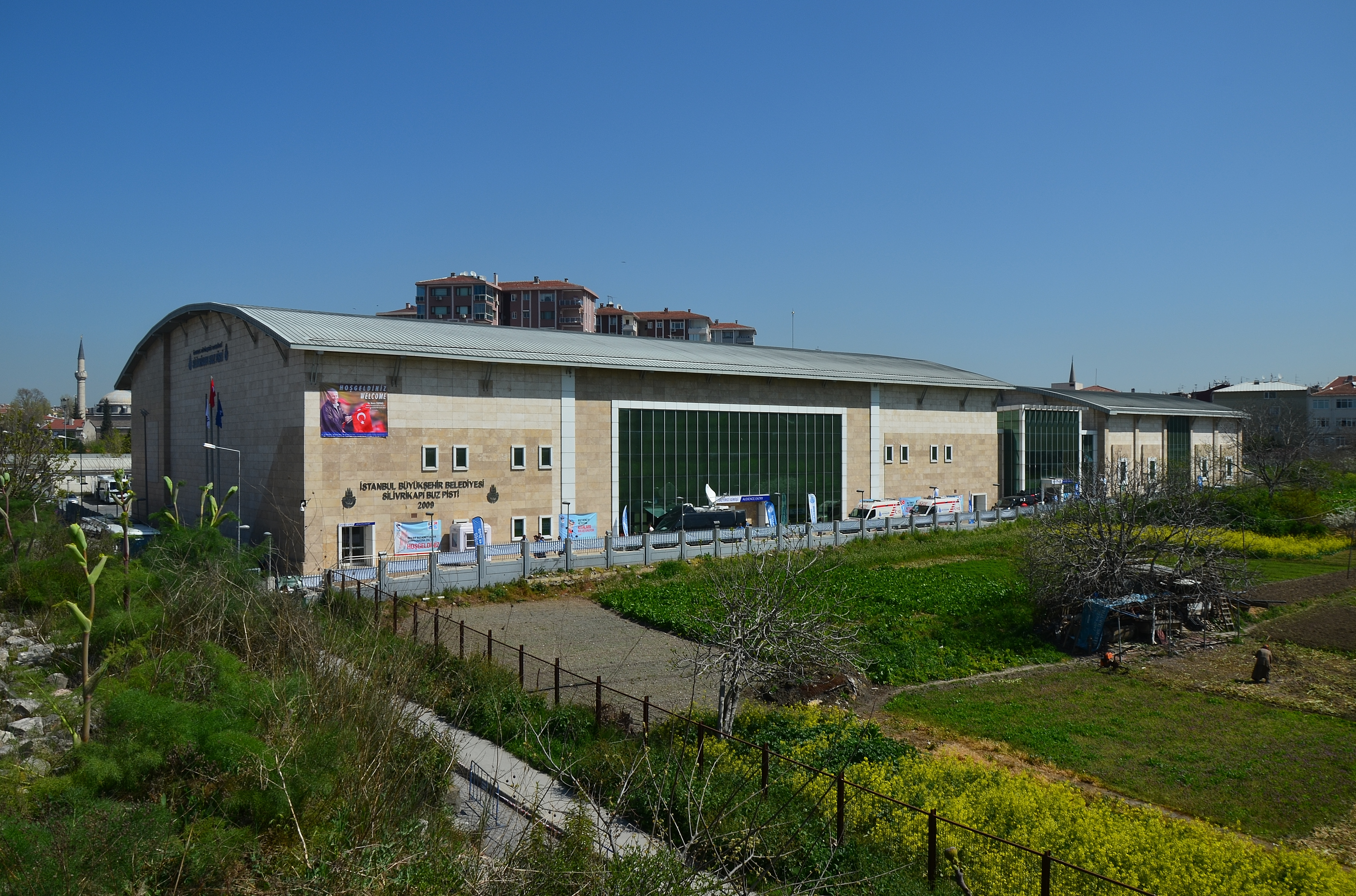
Silivrikapı Ice Skating Hall in Istanbul.

Currently, Turkish Ice Hockey Super League games are played by teams in four cities including Istanbul, Ankara, İzmir and Erzurum. Ice hockey rinks hosting the TBHSL are Silivrikapı Ice Skating Hall (seating capacity: 900) and Zeytinburnu Ice Rink (700) in Istanbul, Ankara Ice Skating Palace (1,150) in Ankara, Bornova Ice Sports Hall (1,751) in İzmir, Palandöken Ice Skating Hall (2,000) and Yakutiye Ice Skating Hall (3,000 and 500) in Erzurum. Another olympic-sized ice hockey rink is Kocaeli B.B. Ice Arena (3,600) in İzmit.

Ice hockey rinks in Turkey follow the IIHF specifications for ice surface dimensions of 60 m × 30 m (197 ft × 98 ft), and a corner radius of 8.50 m (27.9 ft).

== Champions ==
Since 1992–93, a regular Turkish national league is staged. In the first ever edition, six teams competed and B.B. Ankara crowned themselves the champion, by winning all five games. This team has earned the most titles – seven in all. They battled out their last championship in the 2002–03 season. Polis Akademisi ve Koleji (Police Academy) won five championships and has been the most successful team in recent years. Kocaeli B.B. Kağıt S.K. from İzmit was stopped after reigning from 2004. Since the beginning of the Turkish Ice Hockey Super League, Ankara teams have earned the most titles. Apart from the teams based in Ankara, only Istanbul Paten Kulübü and Kocaeli B.B. Kağıt have won the championship.

Season	Champion	Runner up
2025–26	Buzadam Istanbul	Zeytinburnu BS
2024–25	Buzadam Istanbul	Zeytinburnu BS
2023–24	Buzadam Istanbul	İstanbul Büyükşehir Belediyespor
2022–23	Buzadam Istanbul	Buz Beykoz Istanbul
2021–22	Buzadam Istanbul	İstanbul Büyükşehir Belediyespor
2020–21	Buz Beykoz Istanbul	Zeytinburnu BS
2019–20	Buz Beykoz Istanbul	Zeytinburnu BS
2018–19	Zeytinburnu BS	Buzadam Istanbul
2017–18	Zeytinburnu BS	Erzurum BB GSK
2016–17	Zeytinburnu BS	Erzurum BB GSK
2015–16	Zeytinburnu BS	İzmir BB GSK
2014–15	Zeytinburnu BS	İzmir BB GSK
2013–14	İzmir BB GSK	Zeytinburnu BS
2012–13	Başkent Yıldızları	İzmir BB GSK
2011–12	Başkent Yıldızları	Kocaeli B.B. Kağıt SK
2010–11	Başkent Yıldızları	Kocaeli B.B. Kağıt SK
2009–10	Ankara University SK	Başkent Yıldızları
2008–09	Polis Akademisi ve Koleji	Kocaeli B.B. Kağıt SK
2007–08	Polis Akademisi ve Koleji	Kocaeli B.B. Kağıt SK
2006–07	Kocaeli B.B. Kağıt SK	Polis Akademisi ve Koleji
2005–06	Polis Akademisi ve Koleji	Kocaeli B.B. Kağıt SK
2004–05	Polis Akademisi ve Koleji	Kocaeli B.B. Kağıt SK
2003–04	Polis Akademisi ve Koleji	Kocaeli B.B. Kağıt SK
2002–03	B.B. Ankara SK	Polis Akademisi ve Koleji
2001–02	B.B. Ankara SK	Polis Akademisi ve Koleji
2000–01	Polis Akademisi ve Koleji	B.B. Ankara SK
1999–2000	B.B. Ankara SK	Istanbul Paten K
1998–99	Gümüş Patenler SK	Istanbul Paten K
1997–98	Istanbul Paten K	B.B. Ankara SK
1996–97	B.B. Ankara SK	Istanbul Paten K
1995–96	Kavaklıdere B. SK	Istanbul Paten K
1994–95	B.B. Ankara SK	Emniyet SK
1993–94	B.B. Ankara SK	Emniyet SK
1992–93	B.B. Ankara SK	Mülkiye SK

=== Performance by club ===
Club	Champions	Winning years
B.B. Ankara SK	7	1993, 1994, 1995, 1997, 2000, 2002, 2003
Polis Akademisi ve Koleji†	6	2001, 2004, 2005, 2006, 2008, 2009
Zeytinburnu BS	5	2015, 2016, 2017, 2018, 2019
Buzadam Istanbul	5	2022, 2023, 2024, 2025, 2026
Başkent Yıldızları	3	2011, 2012, 2013
Buz Beykoz Istanbul	2	2020, 2021
Kavaklıdere B. SK	1	1996
Istanbul Paten K†	1	1998
Gümüş Patenler SK	1	1999
Kocaeli B.B. Kağıt	1	2007
Ankara University SK	1	2010
İzmir BB GSK	1	2014

† Club has folded and is no longer operating.

== IIHF Continental Cup ==
2022–23 Continental Cup – first round – Group B

Team	Country	W	L	GF	GA
Buzadam İstanbul	Turkey	3	0	19	5
Bulldogs Liège	Belgium	2	1	13	4
Hockey Punks Vilnius	Lithuania	1	2	6	14
FC Barcelona	Spain	0	3	7	22

2022–23 Continental Cup – second round – Group D

Team	Country	W	L	GF	GA
Asiago Hockey	Italy	3	0	28	5
Acroni Jesenice	Slovenia	2	1	14	7
Buzadam İstanbul	Turkey	1	2	9	15
HK Vojvodina	Serbia	0	3	3	27

2021–22 Continental Cup – first round – Group A

Team	Country	W	L	GF	GA
Corona Brașov	Romania	3	0	30	3
KHL Mladost	Croatia	2	1	16	18
FC Barcelona	Spain	1	2	10	14
Buz Beykoz Istanbul	Turkey	0	3	7	28

2019–20 Continental Cup – first round – Group A

Team	Country	W	L	GF	GA
Crvena Zvezda	Serbia	3	0	17	6
Zeytinburnu BS	Turkey	2	1	11	12
Irbis-Skate Sofia	Bulgaria	1	2	9	10
Skautafélag Akureyrar	Iceland	0	3	4	13

2018–19 Continental Cup – first round – Group A

Team	Country	W	L	GF	GA
Vikingar Akureyri	Iceland	3	0	13	5
Irbis-Skate Sofia	Bulgaria	2	1	17	8
Zeytinburnu BS	Turkey	1	2	7	11
HC Bat Yam	Israel	0	3	1	14

2017–18 Continental Cup – first round – Group A

Team	Country	W	L	GF	GA
Crvena Zvezda	Serbia	3	0	15	0
Zeytinburnu BS	Turkey	2	1	10	9
Irbis-Skate Sofia	Bulgaria	1	2	11	11
Esja Reykjavík	Iceland	0	3	5	13

2016–17 Continental Cup – first round – Group A

Team	Country	W	L	GF	GA
Zeytinburnu BS	Turkey	3	0	32	6
Partizan Belgrade	Serbia	2	1	12	14
Irbis-Skate Sofia	Bulgaria	1	2	9	13
HC Bat Yam	Israel	0	3	10	30

2016–17 Continental Cup – second round – Group B

Team	Country	W	L	GF	GA
Nottingham Panthers	Great Britain	3	0	28	4
HK Liepāja	Latvia	2	1	19	6
Zeytinburnu BS	Turkey	1	2	9	23
CH Jaca	Spain	0	3	7	30

2015–16 Continental Cup – first round – Group A

Team	Country	W	L	GF	GA
CSKA Sofia	Bulgaria	3	0	28	10
Zeytinburnu BS	Turkey	2	1	23	14
Partizan Belgrade	Serbia	1	2	14	17
Rishon Devils	Israel	0	3	6	30

2014–15 Continental Cup – First Group Stage – Group A

Team	Country	W	L	GF	GA
CSKA Sofia	Bulgaria	3	0	32	7
CG Puigcerdà	Spain	2	1	27	5
HK Beostar	Serbia	1	2	23	17
İzmir BB GSK	Turkey	0	3	6	59

2013–14 IIHF Continental Cup

Did not participate.

2012–13 Continental Cup – First Group Stage – Group A

Team	Country	W	L	GF	GA
HSC Csíkszereda	Romania	3	0	36	0
Başkent Yıldızları	Turkey	2	1	19	17
HK Vitez	Serbia	1	2	16	12
HC Metulla	Israel	0	3	1	43

2011–12 Continental Cup – First Group Stage – Group A

Team	Country	W	L	GF	GA
White Caps Turnhout	Belgium	2	0	21	3
Tartu Kalev-Välk	Estonia	1	1	13	7
Başkent Yıldızları	Turkey	0	2	3	27
HC Metulla†	Israel	0	0	0	0

† HC Metulla withdrew from tournament in July, 2011

2010–11 Continental Cup – First Group Stage – Group A.

Team	Country	W	L	GF	GA
CH Jaca	Spain	2	0	22	1
Ankara University SK	Turkey	1	1	9	10
HC Bat Yam	Israel	0	2	3	23
Energija Elektrenai†	Lithuania	0	0	0	0

† Energija Elektrenai were not able to compete in the tournament because their airline went bankrupt the day of their departure to Spain.

Turkish teams' Continental Cup results

Year	Team	Host	W	L	PTS	Rd 1	Rd 2	Rd 3	Final
1997–98	B.B. Ankara SK	Romania Miercurea-Ciuc	0	3	0	4th	–	–	–
1998–99	Istanbul Paten K	Romania Bucharest	2	1	4	2nd	–	–	–
1998–99	B.B. Ankara SK	Romania Miercurea-Ciuc	0	3	0	4th	–	–	–
1999–2000	Istanbul Paten K	Bulgaria Sofia	1	2	2	3rd	–	–	–
1999–2000	Gümüş Patenler SK	Bulgaria Sofia	0	3	0	4th	–	–	–
2000–01	Istanbul Paten K	FR Yugoslavia Belgrade	0	3	0	4th	–	–	–
2000–01	B.B. Ankara SK	Bulgaria Sofia	2	1	4	4th	–	–	–
2001–02	Polis Akademisi	Turkey Ankara	2	1	4	2nd	–	–	–
2001–02	B.B. Ankara SK	Bulgaria Sofia	2	1	4	2nd	–	–	–
2002–03	B.B. Ankara SK	Romania Gheorgheni	0	3	0	4th	–	–	–
2003–04	DNP								
2004–05	DNP								
2005–06	Polis Akademisi	Turkey Ankara	2	1	4	2nd	–	–	–
2006–07	Polis Akademisi	Serbia Belgrade	0	1	0	2nd	–	–	–
2007–08	Kocaeli B.B. Kağıt	Romania Miercurea-Ciuc	1	2	3	3rd	–	–	–
2008–09	DNP								
2009–10	Polis Akademisi	Turkey Ankara	1	2	3	3rd	–	–	–
2010–11	Ankara University SK	Spain Jaca	1	1	3	2nd	–	–	–
2011–12	Başkent Yıldızları	Turkey Ankara	0	2	0	3rd	–	–	–
2012–13	Başkent Yıldızları	Romania Miercurea Ciuc	2	1	6	2nd	–	–	–
2013–14	DNP								
2014–15	İzmir BB GSK	Bulgaria Sofia	0	3	0	4th	–	–	–
2015–16	Zeytinburnu BS	Serbia Belgrade	2	1	6	2nd	–	–	–
2016–17	Zeytinburnu BS	Bulgaria Sofia, Spain Jaca	4	2	12	1st	3rd	–	–
2017–18	Zeytinburnu BS	Serbia Belgrade	2	1	5	2nd	–	–	–
2018–19	Zeytinburnu BS	Bulgaria Sofia	1	2	3	3rd	–	–	–
2019–20	Zeytinburnu BS	Turkey Istanbul	2	1	6	2nd	–	–	–
2021–22	Buz Beykoz Istanbul	Romania Brașov	0	3	0	4th	–	–	–
2022–23	Buzadam İstanbul	Turkey Istanbul, Italy Asiago	4	2	12	1st	3rd	–	–

From 1999 to 2002, two clubs qualified for Turkey. Only one year (2000) did both Turkish clubs compete in the same Group.

- DNP: Did not participate

== See also ==
- Turkish Ice Hockey First League
- Turkey national men's ice hockey team
- List of ice hockey leagues
