= Erzurum Büyükşehir Belediyesi GSK =

Erzurum BB GSK
- City: Erzurum, Turkey
- League: Turkish Ice Hockey Super League (TBHSL)
- Founded: 2014

Erzurum BB GSK, short for Erzurum Büyükşehir Belediyesi Gençlik Spor Kulübü, is the ice hockey section of the same named multi-sport club in Erzurum, Turkey founded by the metropolitan municipality (Turkish: Büyükşehir Belediyesi). Currently, the team compete in the Turkish Ice Hockey Super League (TBHSL).

== Achievements ==
The team finished the 2015–16 season third placed after playoffs.

== Current roster ==
As of 1 May 2016.

Goaltenders
No.	Player	Nationality	Date of birth and age
	Ahmet Kars	Turkey	5 May 1996 (age 29)
	Nikita Sandyrev	Russia	27 May 1992 (age 33)
Defense
No.	Player	Nationality	Date of birth and age
	Emre Seçer	Turkey	13 April 1999 (age 26)
	Hüseyin Seçer	Turkey	28 June 1998 (age 27)
	Yusuf Kenan Kars	Turkey	29 June 1987 (age 38)
	Brian Thomas Dunford	United States	15 October 1998 (age 27)
Forwards
No.	Player	Nationality	Date of birth and age
	Abdulkadir İnanç	Turkey	5 September 1995 (age 30)
	Abdullah Avcı	Turkey	19 August 1998 (age 27)
	Fatih Tayğar	Turkey	23 September 1999 (age 26)
	Ogün Kadir Uzunali	Turkey	8 April 1996 (age 29)
	Sait Bingöl	Turkey	7 May 1999 (age 26)
	Konstantin Kuchkin	Russia	16 March 1993 (age 32)
Unspecified
No.	Player	Nationality	Date of birth and age
	Ahmet Saruhan Karan	Turkey	26 July 1998 (age 27)
	Emrah Savaş	Turkey	1 April 1997 (age 28)
	Ömer Faruk Kars	Turkey	24 April 1997 (age 28)
	Muhammed Karagül	Turkey	1 June 1997 (age 28)
	Muhammed Sefa Kavaz	Turkey	17 July 1997 (age 28)
	Nabi Mutanoğlu	Turkey	15 June 1999 (age 26)
	Muhammed Sefa Takar	Turkey	25 June 1997 (age 28)
	Metin Gülen	Turkey	21 February 1997 (age 28)
	Soner Özmen	Turkey	19 June 1998 (age 27)
	Murat Can Kızılkaya	Turkey	13 June 2000 (age 25)
