= ABBA SK =

ABBA S.K.
- City: Ankara, Turkey
- League: Turkish Hockey 1. Lig
- Founded: 2005
- Home arena: Ankara Ice Palace Capacity 1,150
- Colors
- General manager: (Turkey)
- Head coach: (Turkey) Kaan Budak

Franchise history
- 2006-present: ABBA SK
- 2005: Buz Kaplanları
- 2005: Kızıl Kaplan

The ABBA S.K., acronym for "Amatör Buz Pateni ve Buz Hokeyi Ankara İhtisas Spor Kulübü" (literally: "Ice Skating and Ice Hockey Special Amateur Sports Club"), is a sports club established 2005 in Ankara, Turkey specializing in ice hockey, Figure skating and roller skating. The men's ice hockey team participates in the Turkish Hockey SuperLig (TBHSL) and the women's team in the Turkish Ice Hockey Women's League. Both teams play out of the Ankara Ice Palace. The club's colors are orange, navy and white.

== History ==
The ABBA S.K. was founded in 2005 under the name "Kızıl Kaplan" (literally: Red Tiger). In the second half of the same year, the club was renamed "Buz Kaplanları" (Ice Tigers) due to change of the board. In 2007, the club extended its activities by adding the sports branches of figure skating and roller skating.

The hockey team played in the 2006–2007 season in the Turkish Ice Hockey First League. At the end of the season, it nearly missed the championship, and failed so to advance to the Super League. In the 2007–2008 season, the team became champion of the First League with the help of players transferred from Belarus. In the 2008–2009 season, ABBA SK men's ice hockey team played in the Super League. The team played in the 2009–2010 season in the second division of Turkish Ice Hockey First League'sGroup A.
