= 2010–11 IIHF Continental Cup =

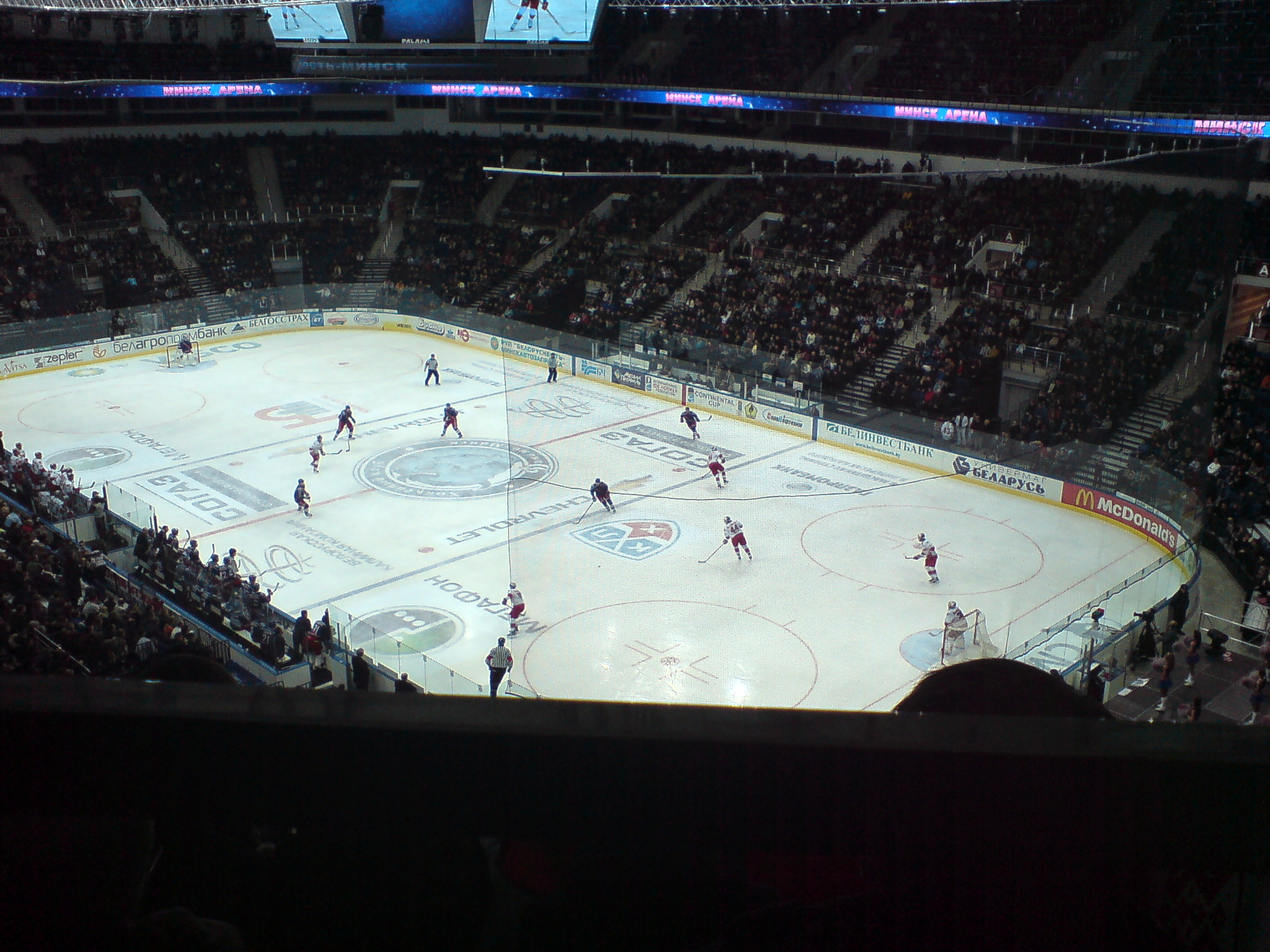
Match between Yunost Minsk and Red Bull Salzburg

The Continental Cup 2010–11 was the 14th edition of the IIHF Continental Cup. The season started on September 24, 2010, and finished on January 16, 2011.

The Super Final was played in Minsk, Belarus on the 14-16 January, 2011.

The points system used in this tournament was: the winner in regular time won 3 points, the loser 0 points; in case of a tie, an overtime and a penalty shootout is played, the winner in penalty shootouts or overtime won 2 points and the loser won 1 point.

== First group stage ==
=== Group A ===
(Jaca, Spain)

Team #1	Score	Team #2
CH Jaca (Spain)	15:0	(Israel) HC Bat Yam
HC Bat Yam (Israel)	3:8	(Turkey) Ankara University SK
Ankara University SK (Turkey)	1:7	(Spain) CH Jaca

=== Group A standings ===
Rank	Team	Points
1	(Spain) CH Jaca	6
2	(Turkey) Ankara University SK	3
3	(Israel) HC Bat Yam	0

- Note: SC Energija of Lithuania was scheduled to compete, however their flight to Jaca was cancelled when their sponsoring airline went bankrupt.

== Second Group Stage ==
=== Group B ===
(Tilburg, Netherlands)

Team #1	Score	Team #2
KS Cracovia (Poland)	9:1	(Estonia) Kohtla-Järve Viru Sputnik
Tilburg Trappers (Netherlands)	8:2	(Spain) CH Jaca
KS Cracovia (Poland)	10:1	(Spain) CH Jaca
Kohtla-Järve Viru Sputnik (Estonia)	7:4	(Netherlands) Tilburg Trappers
Tilburg Trappers (Netherlands)	4:5	(Poland) KS Cracovia
CH Jaca (Spain)	3:5	(Estonia) Kohtla-Järve Viru Sputnik

=== Group B standings ===
Rank	Team	Points
1	(Poland) KS Cracovia	9
2	(Estonia) Kohtla-Järve Viru Sputnik	6
3	(Netherlands) Tilburg Trappers	3
4	(Spain) CH Jaca	0

=== Group C ===
(Maribor, Slovenia)

Team #1	Score	Team #2
Saryarka Karaganda (Kazakhstan)	7:0	(Hungary) DAB-Docler
HDK Maribor (Slovenia)	3:8	(Romania) HSC Csíkszereda
HSC Csíkszereda (Romania)	4:3	(Kazakhstan) Saryarka Karaganda
DAB-Docler (Hungary)	2:3	(Slovenia) HDK Maribor
DAB-Docler (Hungary)	5:2	(Romania) HSC Csíkszereda
HDK Maribor (Slovenia)	2:6	(Kazakhstan) Saryarka Karaganda

=== Group C standings ===
Rank	Team	Points
1	(Romania) HSC Csíkszereda	6
2	(Kazakhstan) Saryarka Karaganda	6
3	(Slovenia) HDK Maribor	3
4	(Hungary) DAB-Docler	3

Note: HSC Csíkszereda qualifies for the next round based on their win over Saryarka Karaganda.

== Third Group Stage ==
=== Group D ===
(Rouen, France)

Team #1	Score	Team #2
Coventry Blaze (United Kingdom)	6:1	(Latvia) HK Liepājas Metalurgs
Dragons de Rouen (France)	1:2 (OT)	(Poland) KS Cracovia
KS Cracovia (Poland)	1:6	(United Kingdom) Coventry Blaze
HK Liepājas Metalurgs (Latvia)	1:4	(France) Dragons de Rouen
KS Cracovia (Poland)	7:5	(Latvia) HK Liepājas Metalurgs
Dragons de Rouen (France)	7:3	(United Kingdom) Coventry Blaze

=== Group D standings ===
Rank	Team	Points
1	(France) Dragons de Rouen	7
2	(United Kingdom) Coventry Blaze	6
3	(Poland) KS Cracovia	5
4	(Latvia) HK Liepājas Metalurgs	0

=== Group E ===
(Asiago, Italy)

Team #1	Score	Team #2
SønderjyskE Ishockey (Denmark)	5:3	(Romania) HSC Csíkszereda
HC Asiago (Italy)	4:3 (SO)	(Ukraine) Sokil Kyiv
Sokil Kyiv (Ukraine)	2:3	(Denmark) SønderjyskE Ishockey
HC Asiago (Italy)	6:1	(Romania) HSC Csíkszereda
HSC Csíkszereda (Romania)	4:7	(Ukraine) Sokil Kyiv
SønderjyskE Ishockey (Denmark)	4:3 (SO)	(Italy) HC Asiago

=== Group E standings ===
Rank	Team	Points
1	(Denmark) SønderjyskE Ishockey	8
2	(Italy) HC Asiago	6
3	(Ukraine) Sokil Kyiv	4
4	(Romania) HSC Csíkszereda	0

== Final stage ==
=== Final Group ===
(Minsk, Belarus)

Team #1	Score	Team #2
Red Bull Salzburg (Austria)	6:1	(France) Dragons de Rouen
Yunost Minsk (Belarus)	2:1	(Denmark) SønderjyskE Ishockey
Dragons de Rouen (France)	2:4	(Belarus) Yunost Minsk
Red Bull Salzburg (Austria)	3:2	(Denmark) SønderjyskE Ishockey
SønderjyskE Ishockey (Denmark)	3:2	(France) Dragons de Rouen
Yunost Minsk (Belarus)	4:3	(Austria) Red Bull Salzburg

=== Final Group standings ===
Rank	Team	Points
1	(Belarus) Yunost Minsk	9
2	(Austria) Red Bull Salzburg	6
3	(Denmark) SønderjyskE Ishockey	3
4	(France) Dragons de Rouen	0
