= 2002–03 IIHF Continental Cup =

The Continental Cup 2002–03 was the sixth edition of the IIHF Continental Cup. The season started on September 20, 2002, and finished on January 12, 2003.

The tournament was won by Jokerit, who beat Lokomotiv Yaroslavl in the final.

== Preliminary round ==
=== Group A ===
(Barcelona, Spain)

Team #1	Score	Team #2
HK Riga 2000 (Latvia)	5:0	(Croatia) KHL Zagreb
FC Barcelona (Spain)	4:11	(Netherlands) Tilburg Trappers
FC Barcelona (Spain)	1:4	(Croatia) KHL Zagreb
HK Riga 2000 (Latvia)	7:1	(Netherlands) Tilburg Trappers
FC Barcelona (Spain)	4:12	(Latvia) HK Riga 2000
Tilburg Trappers (Netherlands)	4:1	(Croatia) KHL Zagreb

=== Group A standings ===
Rank	Team	Points
1	(Latvia) HK Riga 2000	6
2	(Netherlands) Tilburg Trappers	4
3	(Croatia) KHL Zagreb	2
4	(Spain) FC Barcelona	0

=== Group B ===
(Amsterdam, Netherlands)

Team #1	Score	Team #2
Kazzinc-Torpedo (Kazakhstan)	9:4	(Federal Republic of Yugoslavia) HK Novi Sad
Boretti Tigers Amsterdam (Netherlands)	7:1	(Spain) CH Jaca
Boretti Tigers Amsterdam (Netherlands)	8:2	(Federal Republic of Yugoslavia) HK Novi Sad
Kazzinc-Torpedo (Kazakhstan)	13:0	(Spain) CH Jaca
HK Novi Sad (Federal Republic of Yugoslavia)	5:3	(Spain) CH Jaca
Boretti Tigers Amsterdam (Netherlands)	4:5	(Kazakhstan) Kazzinc-Torpedo

=== Group B standings ===
Rank	Team	Points
1	(Kazakhstan) Kazzinc-Torpedo	6
2	(Netherlands) Boretti Tigers Amsterdam	4
3	(Federal Republic of Yugoslavia) HK Novi Sad	2
4	(Spain) CH Jaca	0

=== Group C ===
(Gheorgheni, Romania)

Team #1	Score	Team #2
HK Acroni Jesenice (Slovenia)	1:1	(Croatia) KHL Medveščak Zagreb
CS Progym Gheorgheni (Romania)	8:5	(Turkey) Ankara Büyükşehir
HK Acroni Jesenice (Slovenia)	24:0	(Turkey) Ankara Büyükşehir
CS Progym Gheorgheni (Romania)	4:5	(Croatia) KHL Medveščak Zagreb
KHL Medveščak Zagreb (Croatia)	14:1	(Turkey) Ankara Büyükşehir
CS Progym Gheorgheni (Romania)	4:11	(Slovenia) HK Acroni Jesenice

=== Group C standings ===
Rank	Team	Points	DIF
1	(Slovenia) HK Acroni Jesenice	5	+31
2	(Croatia) KHL Medveščak Zagreb	5	+14
3	(Romania) CS Progym Gheorgheni	2	
4	(Turkey) Ankara Büyükşehir	0	

=== Group D ===
(Belgrade, FR Yugoslavia)

Team #1	Score	Team #2
Dunaferr SE (Hungary)	26:0	(Bulgaria) HC Slavia Sofia
KHK Crvena Zvezda (Federal Republic of Yugoslavia)	10:2	(Israel) HC Ma'alot
KHK Crvena Zvezda (Federal Republic of Yugoslavia)	10:3	(Bulgaria) HC Slavia Sofia
Dunaferr SE (Hungary)	16:0	(Israel) HC Ma'alot
HC Slavia Sofia (Bulgaria)	10:3	(Israel) HC Ma'alot
KHK Crvena Zvezda (Federal Republic of Yugoslavia)	0:11	(Hungary) Dunaferr SE

=== Group D standings ===
Rank	Team	Points
1	(Hungary) Dunaferr SE	6
2	(Federal Republic of Yugoslavia) KHK Crvena Zvezda	4
3	(Bulgaria) HC Slavia Sofia	2
4	(Israel) HC Ma'alot	0

=== Group E ===
(Székesfehérvár, Hungary)

Team #1	Score	Team #2
HC Steaua București (Romania)	5:3	(Lithuania) SC Energija
Alba Volán Székesfehérvár (Hungary)	5:0	(Slovenia) HK Sportina Bled
HC Steaua București (Romania)	3:1	(Slovenia) HK Sportina Bled
Alba Volán Székesfehérvár (Hungary)	12:5	(Lithuania) SC Energija
SC Energija (Lithuania)	7:2	(Slovenia) HK Sportina Bled
Alba Volán Székesfehérvár (Hungary)	3:1	(Romania) HC Steaua București

=== Group E standings ===
Rank	Team	Points
1	(Hungary) Alba Volán Székesfehérvár	6
2	(Romania) HC Steaua București	4
3	(Lithuania) SC Energija	2
4	(Slovenia) HK Sportina Bled	0

== First Group Stage ==
=== Group F ===
(Rouen, France)

Team #1	Score	Team #2
Ayr Scottish Eagles (United Kingdom)	2:1	(Norway) Storhamar Dragons
Dragons de Rouen (France)	5:1	(Latvia) HK Riga 2000
Storhamar Dragons (Norway)	2:1	(Latvia) HK Riga 2000
Dragons de Rouen (France)	2:6	(United Kingdom) Ayr Scottish Eagles
Dragons de Rouen (France)	*	(Norway) Storhamar Dragons
Ayr Scottish Eagles (United Kingdom)	*	(Latvia) HK Riga 2000

*: Games were suspended because of electric failure; and were never played

=== Group F standings + ===
Rank	Team	Points	GF
1	(United Kingdom) Ayr Scottish Eagles	4	
2	(France) Dragons de Rouen	2	7
3	(Norway) Storhamar Dragons	2	3
4	(Latvia) HK Riga 2000	0	

+: (United Kingdom) Ayr Scottish Eagles went bankrupt before the next round was played, then (France) Dragons de Rouen took their place

=== Group G ===
(Linz, Austria)

Team #1	Score	Team #2
Kazzinc-Torpedo (Kazakhstan)	7:2	(France) Brûleurs de Loups Grenoble
EHC Black Wings Linz (Austria)	6:0	(Poland) GKS Katowice
Brûleurs de Loups Grenoble (France)	6:3	(Poland) GKS Katowice
EHC Black Wings Linz (Austria)	4:2	(Kazakhstan) Kazzinc-Torpedo
EHC Black Wings Linz (Austria)	6:4	(France) Brûleurs de Loups Grenoble
Kazzinc-Torpedo (Kazakhstan)	7:1	(Poland) GKS Katowice

=== Group G standings ===
Rank	Team	Points
1	(Austria) EHC Black Wings Linz	6
2	(Kazakhstan) Kazzinc-Torpedo	4
3	(France) Brûleurs de Loups Grenoble	2
4	(Poland) GKS Katowice	0

=== Group H ===
(Liepāja, Latvia)

Team #1	Score	Team #2
Jukurit (Finland)	2:1	(Belarus) HK Neman Grodno
HK Liepājas Metalurgs (Latvia)	1:2	(Slovenia) HK Acroni Jesenice
Jukurit (Finland)	3:1	(Slovenia) HK Acroni Jesenice
HK Liepājas Metalurgs (Latvia)	1:2	(Belarus) HK Neman Grodno
HK Neman Grodno (Belarus)	3:2	(Slovenia) HK Acroni Jesenice
HK Liepājas Metalurgs (Latvia)	3:1	(Finland) Jukurit

=== Group H standings ===
Rank	Team	Points	
1	(Finland) Jukurit	4	(GF:2;GA:1)
2	(Belarus) HK Neman Grodno	4	(GF:1;GA:2)
3	(Latvia) HK Liepājas Metalurgs	2	
4	(Slovenia) HK Acroni Jesenice	0	

=== Group I ===
(Oświęcim, Poland)

Team #1	Score	Team #2
Dunaferr SE (Hungary)	4:4	(Belarus) Khimvolokno Mogilev
Dwory Unia Oświęcim (Poland)	1:5	(Hungary) Alba Volán Székesfehérvár
Dunaferr SE (Hungary)	8:4	(Hungary) Alba Volán Székesfehérvár
Dwory Unia Oświęcim (Poland)	6:4	(Belarus) Khimvolokno Mogilev
Alba Volán Székesfehérvár (Hungary)	4:2	(Belarus) Khimvolokno Mogilev
Dwory Unia Oświęcim (Poland)	2:2	(Hungary) Dunaferr SE

=== Group I standings ===
Rank	Team	Points	
1	(Hungary) Dunaferr SE	4	(GF:8;GA:4)
2	(Hungary) Alba Volán Székesfehérvár	4	(GF:4;GA:8)
3	(Poland) Dwory Unia Oświęcim	3	
4	(Belarus) Khimvolokno Mogilev	1	

(United Kingdom) Belfast Giants, (Norway) Vålerenga, (Italy) AS Asiago, (Slovenia) HDD Olimpija Ljubljana, (Belarus) Keramin Minsk, (Slovakia) HC Slovan Bratislava, (Ukraine) Sokil Kiev, (Austria) EC Villacher SV : bye

== Second Group Stage ==
=== Group J ===
(Belfast, United Kingdom)

Team #1	Score	Team #2
Dragons de Rouen (France)	4:4	(Austria) EHC Black Wings Linz
Belfast Giants (United Kingdom)	3:0	(Norway) Vålerenga
EHC Black Wings Linz (Austria)	3:1	(Norway) Vålerenga
Belfast Giants (United Kingdom)	8:0	(France) Dragons de Rouen
Vålerenga (Norway)	5:1	(France) Dragons de Rouen
Belfast Giants (United Kingdom)	5:3	(Austria) EHC Black Wings Linz

=== Group J standings ===
Rank	Team	Points
1	(United Kingdom) Belfast Giants	6
2	(Austria) EHC Black Wings Linz	3
3	(Norway) Vålerenga	2
4	(France) Dragons de Rouen	1

=== Group K ===
(Asiago, Italy)

Team #1	Score	Team #2
Jukurit (Finland)	4:1	(Slovenia) HDD Olimpija Ljubljana
AS Asiago (Italy)	3:3	(Belarus) Keramin Minsk
Keramin Minsk (Belarus)	5:3	(Finland) Jukurit
AS Asiago (Italy)	3:2	(Slovenia) HDD Olimpija Ljubljana
Keramin Minsk (Belarus)	3:2	(Slovenia) HDD Olimpija Ljubljana
AS Asiago (Italy)	1:2	(Finland) Jukurit

=== Group K standings ===
Rank	Team	Points
1	(Belarus) Keramin Minsk	5
2	(Finland) Jukurit	4
3	(Italy) AS Asiago	3
4	(Slovenia) HDD Olimpija Ljubljana	0

=== Group L ===
(Bratislava, Slovakia)

Team #1	Score	Team #2
Sokil Kiev (Ukraine)	6:2	(Austria) EC Villacher SV
HC Slovan Bratislava (Slovakia)	6:2	(Hungary) Dunaferr SE
Dunaferr SE (Hungary)	3:3	(Austria) EC Villacher SV
HC Slovan Bratislava (Slovakia)	6:2	(Ukraine) Sokil Kiev
Dunaferr SE (Hungary)	4:4	(Ukraine) Sokil Kiev
HC Slovan Bratislava (Slovakia)	2:2	(Austria) EC Villacher SV

=== Group L standings ===
Rank	Team	Points
1	(Slovakia) HC Slovan Bratislava	5
2	(Ukraine) Sokil Kiev	3
3	(Hungary) Dunaferr SE	2
4	(Austria) EC Villacher SV	1

(Italy) HC Milano Vipers, (Finland) Jokerit, (Russia) Lokomotiv Yaroslavl, (Switzerland) HC Davos, (Switzerland) HC Lugano : bye

== Third Stage ==
=== Group M ===
(Lugano, Switzerland)

==== Group M Semifinals ====
Team #1	Score	Team #2
HC Davos (Switzerland)	1:2	(Russia) Lokomotiv Yaroslavl
HC Lugano (Switzerland)	2:0	(United Kingdom) Belfast Giants

==== Group M Third Place ====
Team #1	Score	Team #2
HC Davos (Switzerland)	2:4	(United Kingdom) Belfast Giants

==== Group M Final ====
Team #1	Score	Team #2
HC Lugano (Switzerland)	3:6	(Russia) Lokomotiv Yaroslavl

=== Group N ===
(Milan, Italy)

==== Group N Semifinals ====
Team #1	Score	Team #2
Jokerit (Finland)	5:2	(Slovakia) HC Slovan Bratislava
HC Milano Vipers (Italy)	3:3 (0:1 PS)	(Belarus) Keramin Minsk

==== Group N Third Place ====
Team #1	Score	Team #2
HC Milano Vipers (Italy)	1:6	(Slovakia) HC Slovan Bratislava

==== Group N Final ====
Team #1	Score	Team #2
Jokerit (Finland)	5:2	(Belarus) Keramin Minsk

== Final stage ==
(Lugano, Switzerland) & (Milan, Italy)

=== Seventh place match ===
Team #1	Score	Team #2
HC Milano Vipers (Italy)	0:2	(Switzerland) HC Davos

=== Fifth place match ===
Team #1	Score	Team #2
HC Slovan Bratislava (Slovakia)	4:3	(United Kingdom) Belfast Giants

=== Third place match ===
Team #1	Score	Team #2
HC Lugano (Switzerland)	5:0	(Belarus) Keramin Minsk

=== Final ===
Team #1	Score	Team #2
Jokerit (Finland)	1:1 (1:0 PS)	(Russia) Lokomotiv Yaroslavl
