= Truva Paten Spor Kulübü =

- City: Ankara, Turkey
- League: Turkish Ice Hockey Super League (TBHSL); Turkish Ice Hockey Women's League (TBHBL)TBHF Minikler (u10) TBHF Yıldız B (u12) TBHF Yıldız A (u14)
- Founded: 2005
- Home arena: Ankara İce skating palace
- Colours
- Owner(s): Hatice Gizem Tüzgen Dağlı
- General manager: Ali Bilgehan Barak
- Head coach: Gökhan Dağlı
- Website: www.truvapaten.com

Truva Paten Spor Kulübü, aka Ankara Truva, is a Turkish ice hockey club based in Ankara, Turkey. Founded in 2005, the club's men's team play in the Turkish Ice Hockey Super League (TBHSL) and the women's team in the Turkish Ice Hockey Women's League (TBHBL). The club with the colors yellow, white and black play their home matches at the Ankara ice skating palace.

== Achievements ==
- 2011–12 TBHSL season Group A 3rd
- 2012–13 TBHSL season 5th

=== Men's team roster (2012-13) ===
#	Player	Nationality	Birth date	Height	Weight	Shoots
Goalkeepers
99	Cahit Can Algül	(Turkey)	1994-04-22			
19	Jiri Vybiral	(Czech Republic)	1989-04-19	181	74	L
Defenders
17	Huseyin Avni Gudul	(Turkey)				
2	Omercan Demiral	(Turkey)				
32	İsmail Eroğlu	(Turkey)	1981-09-30			
44	Sertan Güllüzaroğlu	(Turkey)	1981-08-27			
33	Farzad Houshidari	(Iran)	1987-09-06			
21	Serhat Kaytaz	(Turkey)	1974-06-15	181	86	L
4	İbrahim Oğuz	(Turkey)	1992-05-28	187	87	R
23	Melik Öztürk	(Turkey)	1982-03-20	185	80	L
Defender / Forwards
	Peter Krsjak	(Slovakia)	1981-03-23	185	90	L
Forwards
60	Taha Afal	(Turkey)	1984-04-19	175	58	R
5	Sertaç Alkan	(Turkey)	1983-02-20			
10	Yılmaz Ömer Arasan	(Turkey)	1968-08-11	183	88	R
66	Onur Eroğlu	(Turkey)	1984-12-10	187	83	R
	Enes Kahraman	(Turkey)				
9	Yuto Kiribuchi	(Japan)	1987-04-21	167	68	
42	Necip Oğuz	(Turkey)	1998			
88	Kaan Özgencil	(Turkey)	1987-12-13	178	72	L
56	Oleg Vasiliev	(Ukraine)	1973-01-19			
73	Burak Aydın	(Turkey)	1994-01-16	62		
Playing coach
	Peter Krsjak	(Slovakia)	1981-03-23	62		
