= Kocaeli Büyükşehir Belediyesi Kağıt S.K. Men's Ice Hockey =

Kocaeli B.B. Kağıt Spor
- City: İzmit, Turkey
- League: Turkish Ice Hockey Super League
- Founded: 2000
- Home arena: Kocaeli B.B. Ice Arena
- Colours
- General manager: Gültekin Görüm
- Head coach: Tarık Göçmen

Franchise history
- 2000-present: Kocaeli BB Kagitspor

Kocaeli Büyükşehir Belediyesi Kağıt Spor Kulübü is an ice hockey team in İzmit, Turkey. They play in the Turkish Ice Hockey Super League, the highest level of Turkish ice hockey. The team plays its home games at Kocaeli B.B. Ice Arena, which has a seating capacity of 3,600 people.

== History ==
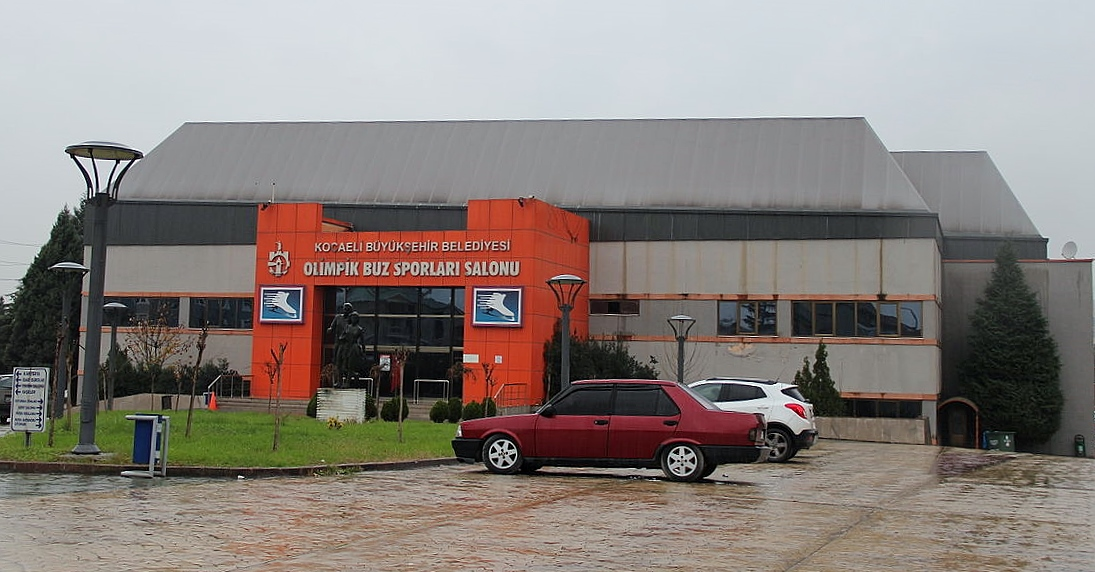
Kocaeli B.B. Ice Arena

The Kocaeli ice hockey team was founded in 2000, and finished second place against Police Academy and College in the 2003–04, 2004–05 and 2005–06 Turkish Ice Hockey Super League seasons. In the 2006–07 season, they defeated Police Academy, and finally won their first Super League title. In the 2007–08 and 2008–09 seasons, they lost in the final to Police Academy for the fifth time in five years. In the 2010–11 season, the team was defeated by Başkent Yıldızları and achieved second place in the final.

The team appeared in the 2007–08 IIHF Continental Cup. They were paired with SC Miercurea Ciuc, KHL Mladost Zagreb and CG Puigcerdà. They defeated Puigcerda 5–4, and hence brought home Turkey's first win in the IIHF Continental Cup, while still not passing the preliminary stage.

== Achievements ==
- Turkish champion: 2007.
- Turkish runner-up: 2004, 2005, 2006, 2008.
