= Anka Spor Kulübü =

Anka Spor Kulubu
- Nickname: Anka Kuşu (Phoenix)
- City: Ankara, Turkey
- League: Turkish Super League
- Founded: 2004
- Home arena: Ankara Ice Palace (Capacity 1,050)
- Colours
- General manager: (Turkey) Anıl Uyar,
- Head coach: (Turkey) Anıl Uyar, (Turkey) Cagil Uyar
- Website: ankasportsclub.tr.gg

The sports club Anka Spor Kulübü (Anka SK) is a professional men's and women's, young and PW ice hockey teams from Ankara, Turkey. The men participate in the Turkish Hockey SuperLig (TBHSL) and the women in the Turkish Ice Hockey Women's League, Turkish Young's Ice Hockey League and Turkish PW Ice Hockey Tournament. The teams play in the Ankara Ice Palace. The club's colors are fire red and night blue.

== History ==
The men's team finished the league as following:

Season	No. of teams	Finishing position
2004-05	10	2
2005-06	6	3
2006-07	8	3
2007-08	7	3
2008-09		
2009-10		not joined

== Men's team ==
=== Men’s roster 2010-2011 ===
#	Player	Nationality	Previous club
Goaltenders
70	Çağıl Uyar	(Turkey)	Başkent Yıldızları
	Mert Özyılmaz	(Turkey)	Başkent Yıldızları
Defense
38	Anıl Demirtaş	(Turkey)	Anka SK
55	Erkan Tokyürek	(Turkey)	İstanbul Buz Kartalları
4	Ibrahim Ufuk Acar	(Turkey)	Truva Paten SK
31	Hasan F. Boztepe	(Turkey)	Anka SK
57	Murat Binerbay	(Turkey)	Anka SK
91	Denizhan Topalcan	(Turkey)	Anka SK
	Oğulcan Arısoy	(Turkey)	Youth System
Forwards
11	Anıl Uyar	(Turkey)	Başkent Yıldızları
23	Bora Ünsal	(Turkey)	İstanbul Buz Kartalları
7	Bilal Öztürk	(Turkey)	Anka SK
	Barış Ürün	(Turkey)	Youth System
42	Alpaslan Eroğlu	(Turkey)	Youth System
81	Seli Narin	(Turkey)	Anka SK
	Orhun Bilenler	(Turkey)	Youth System

=== Former foreign players ===
#	Player	Position	Nationality	Previous club
99	Oleg Vasylyev	C	(Ukraine)	B.B. Ankaraspor
10	Vadim Borovsky	RD	(Ukraine)	Police Academy
20	Artem Borovsky	RF	(Ukraine)	Sirius
44	Jamaal Williams	LF	(United States)	Youth system
10	Rick Nichol	D	(Canada)	Gèu Vielha-Val d'Aran
20	Tomas Kukucka	RF	(Slovakia)	HC Font Romeu
98	Michael D. Jones	RD	(England)	Flintshire Freeze
13	Gary J. Gagne	LF	(United States)	Mon Valley Thunder
20	Casey Minson	RF	(Australia)	Newcastle North Stars

== Women's team ==
=== Women’s roster ===
#	Player	Nationality	Previous club
Goaltenders
70	Merve Bolulu	(Turkey)	Truva Paten SK
1	Burçin Doruk	(Turkey)	Anka SK
Defense
25	Gülin Aktaş	(Turkey)	Anka SK
20	Pelin Aktaş	(Turkey)	Anka SK
	Mıray Cansu Koşum	(Turkey)	Anka SK
55	Melis Pekmezcan	(Turkey)	Anka SK
	Aslı Akgöl	(Turkey)	Anka SK
	Nihan Arıman	(Turkey)	Anka SK
Forwards
11	Burçin Özkan	(Turkey)	Anka SK
5	Gülçin Çakar	(Turkey)	Anka SK
	Cansu Özyılmaz	(Turkey)	Anka SK
	Ece Tansel	(Turkey)	Anka SK
	Sıla Ünal	(Turkey)	Anka SK
	Ece Özpınar	(Turkey)	Anka SK
	Görkem Tilic	(Turkey)	Anka SK
