= Başkent Yıldızları =

Başkent Yıldızları SK
- City: Ankara, Turkey
- League: Turkish Hockey SuperLig
- Founded: 1998
- Home arena: Ankara Ice Palace Capacity 1,150
- Colors
- General manager: (Turkey) Yener Taşdemir
- Head coach: (United States) Keith McAdams (Turkey) Göktürk Taşdemir

Franchise history
- 1998-present: Başkent Yıldızları S.K.

Championships
- Regular season titles: 2010–11; 2011–12; 2012–13

The Başkent Yıldızları S.K., abbreviated form of Başkent Yıldızları Buz Pateni ve Buz Hokeyi Spor Kulübü, is a sports club founded in 1988 in Ankara, Turkey with a professional men's and a women's ice hockey team. The men participate in the Turkish Hockey Super Lig (TBHSL) and the women participate in the Turkish Ice Hockey Women's League. Both teams play out of the Ankara Ice Palace.

Başkent Yıldızları is Turkish for "Capital City Stars".

== History ==
For the 2008–09 season, the team finished third out of the six team league. Başkent Yıldızları lost in the semi-finals to the eventual champions Polis Akademisi.

The 2010–11 season was shortened to a round robin playoff format. Başkent ıldızları was the only team to field a full import roster, they easily won the 2010–11 Turkish Super League Championship.

== Men's team ==
=== Men's 2009-2010 schedule and results ===
2009–2010 regular season results

Date	Team	Score	Score	Opponent	Location
Nov. 8, 2009	Baskent Yildizlari	12	4	Polis Akademisi	Ankara, Belpa
Nov. 15, 2009	Baskent Yildizlari	4	14	Ankara University	Ankara, Belpa
Nov. 22, 2009	Baskent Yildizlari	6	4	Kocaeli BB Kagitspor	Ankara, Belpa
Nov. 29, 2009	Başkent Yıldızları	9	1	Ankara BB SK	Ankara, Belpa
Dec. 13, 2009	Başkent Yıldızları	34	1	Izmit Şirintepe SK	Ankara, Belpa
Jan. 24, 2010	Başkent Yıldızları	11	5	Polis Akademisi	Istanbul
Jan. 30, 2010	Başkent Yıldızları	4	4	Ankara University	Ankara, Belpa
Feb. 7, 2010	Başkent Yıldızları	8	5	Kocaeli BB Kagitspor	Istanbul
Feb. 13, 2010	Başkent Yıldızları	17	2	Ankara BB SK	Istanbul
Feb. 20, 2010	Başkent Yıldızları	20	0	Izmit Şirintepe SK	Istanbul

=== 2010 playoffs ===
Semi-Finals, Feb. 27, 2010
1	Ankara University	7
4	Kocaeli BB Kagitspor	2
2	Başkent Yıldızları	8
3	Polis Akademisi	1

Finals, Feb. 28, 2010
1	Ankara University	7
2	Başkent Yıldızları	3

=== Men’s roster (2012-2013) ===
#	Player	Nationality	Previous club
Goaltenders
6	Berke Ricketti	(Northern Cyprus) (United States)	Edinburgh Eagles (ice hockey)
29	Erol Kahraman	(Northern Cyprus) (Canada)	Başkent Yıldızları
33	Barış Ucele	(Turkey)	Başkent Yıldızları
Defense
4	Galip Hamarat	(Turkey)	Başkent Yıldızları
7	Murat Peçenek	(Turkey)	Başkent Yıldızları
13	Firat Erdem	(Turkey)	Başkent Yıldızları
15	Michal Klepac	(Slovakia)	HK 32 Liptovsky Mikulas
25	Göktürk Tasdemir	(Turkey)	Başkent Yıldızları
Forwards
5	Dogukan Gönülal	(Turkey)	Başkent Yıldızları
9	Andy Koçoğlu	(Turkey) (United States)	Long Beach Bombers
12	Alec Koçoğlu	(Turkey) (United States)	California Heat
20	Miroslav Oravec	(Slovakia)	HK 32 Liptovsky Mikulas
21	Alper Solak	(Turkey)	Başkent Yıldızları
42	Denis Legersky	(Slovakia)	HK 32 Liptovsky Mikulas
61	Jan Pajong	(Slovakia)	HK 32 Liptovsky Mikulas
66	Barış Sesli	(Turkey)	Başkent Yıldızları
87	Egemen Tasboga	(Turkey)	Truva Ankara
94	Gökalp Solak	(Turkey)	Başkent Yıldızları

=== Men’s roster (2009-2010) ===
#	Player	Nationality	Previous club
Goaltenders
33	Özkan Dereli	(Turkey)	Istanbul Paten SK
61	Tyler Bilton	(Canada)	Saint Michael's College (NCAA)
Defense
3	Berkcan Özturk	(Turkey)	Başkent Yıldızları
7	Andrei Gorovoi	(Ukraine)	HC Berkut Kyiv (2 Lig UKR)
13	Firat Erdem	(Turkey)	Başkent Yıldızları
15	Michal Tomasik	(Slovakia)	HC Polygón Prievidza (1.Liga SVK)
25	Göktürk Tasdemir	(Turkey)	Başkent Yıldızları
27	Ümit Ayik	(Turkey)	Başkent Yıldızları
29	Mahmut Yürekli	(Turkey)	Başkent Yıldızları
32	Ismail Eroğlu	(Turkey)	Başkent Yıldızları
Forwards
99	Jurijs Klujevskis	(Latvia)	ASK Ogre (Belarus League)
8	Yücel Çıtak	(Turkey)	Başkent Yıldızları
6	Sertac Alkan	(Turkey)	Başkent Yıldızları
9	Tufan Dinc	(Turkey)	Başkent Yıldızları
10	Ömer Arasan	(Turkey)	Başkent Yıldızları
11	Dimitri Rudenko	(Ukraine)	Başkent Yıldızları
19	Bilgehan Kiral	(Turkey)	Başkent Yıldızları
44	Sertan Güllüzaroğlu	(Turkey)	Başkent Yıldızları
92	Gökalp Solak	(Turkey)	Başkent Yıldızları
97	Mert Yiğitbaşı	(Turkey)	Başkent Yıldızları

== Women's team ==
=== Women's 2009-2010 schedule and results ===
Game	Team	Score	Score	Opponent	Location
1	Başkent Yıldızları	25	0	ABBA SK	Ankara, Belpa
2	Başkent Yıldızları	0	8	Ankara University	Ankara, Belpa
3	Başkent Yıldızları	2	8	Milenyum SK	Ankara, Belpa
4	Başkent Yıldızları	26	0	ABBA SK	Ankara, Belpa
5	Başkent Yıldızları	6	3	Ankara University	Ankara, Belpa
6	Başkent Yıldızları	1	1	Milenyum SK	Ankara, Belpa

=== Women’s roster (2009-2010) ===
#	Player	Nationality	Previous club
Goaltenders
Defensemen
7	Brittany O'Brien	(United States)	Saint Michael's College (NCAA)
8	Kate Wolgemuth	(United States)	Colgate University (NCAA)
	Aslı Çukurkavaklı (C)	(Turkey)	
Forwards

Legend:

- C Captain
