= Ankara University SK =

- City: Ankara, Turkey
- League: Turkish Ice Hockey Super League
- Founded: 1948
- Home arena: Ankara Ice Palace Capacity 1,150
- Colors
- General manager: (Turkey) Prof. Dr. Yetkin Güngör
- Head coach: (Turkey)

Franchise history
- 1948: Ankara Üniversitesi Spor Kulübü

Championships
- Regular season titles: 2009-2010

The sports club Ankara University is a professional men's and women's ice hockey team from Ankara, Turkey. The men's team participated in the Turkish Hockey SuperLig (TBHSL) for the first time in the season (2009–2010), and became champion.

The women's team plays in Group A in the Turkish Ice Hockey Women's League

== Men's team ==
=== Season-by-season record ===
Turkish Ice Hockey Super League

Season	GP	W	L	T	PTS	GF	GA	PIM	Finish
2009-10	5	5	0	0	--	--	--	--	--

=== Men’s roster (2009-2010) ===
#	Player	Nationality	Previous club
Goaltenders
Defense
Forwards

== Women's team ==
=== Women’s roster (2009-2010) ===
#	Player	Nationality	Previous club
Goaltenders
55	İlknur Dilmaç	(Turkey)	
Defense
52	Selin Erenoğlu	(Turkey)	
8	Janely Pokk	(Estonia)	
15	Merve Akkul	(Turkey)	
21	Tuvana Günay	(Turkey)	
17	Kübra Erkanlı	(Turkey)	
Forwards
22	Başak Demirkol	(Turkey)	
23	Nataša Pagon	(Slovenia)	HK Triglav Kranj
25	Ece Varol	(Turkey)	
89	Melike Aydın	(Turkey)	
91	Seda Yürekli	(Turkey)	
16	Zeynep Avcı (C)	(Turkey)	
5	Özge Lalegül	(Turkey)	
13	Tuğba Koşka	(Turkey)	
34	Müge Canbey	(Turkey)	
2	Alize Naz	(Turkey)	
