= Kocaeli Büyükşehir Belediyesi Kağıt Spor Kulübü =

Multi-sports club in Turkey

- Formation: 1937
- Type: Non-profit
- Purpose: Sport: football, volleyball, basketball, wrestling, weightlifting, martial arts, athletics, ice hockey
- Headquarters: SEKASEM
- Location: İzmit, Kocaeli, Turkey
- Coordinates: 40.7627443°N 29.9139047°E
- President: Dr. Ali Yeşildal

The Kocaeli Büyükşehir Belediyesi Kağıt Spor Kulübü, aka KocaeliBB Kağıtspor, is a multi-sports club sponsored by the Metropolitan Municipality of Kocaeli in Turkey. It was founded in 1937 as "İzmit Kağıtspor", a sports club of the state-owned SEKA Cellulose and Paper Works in Izmit, Kocaeli. Club colors are blue and white. Current club president is Dr. Ali Yeşildal, who is also the chairman of the Turkish Ice Hockey Federation.

Since the beginning, İzmit Kağıtspor has operated branches like rowing and sailing and won also many international titles in athletics, wrestling, and boxing. The club merged in 1987 into "Kocaeli Belediyespor" and was renamed. It has expanded quickly since then and is active in 30 sports branches with a total of 2,453 athletes as of 2007, making it one of the biggest sports clubs of Turkey. Its amateur and professional individual sports people and teams of various branches are very successful at domestic and international events as well. The total number of sports people licensed by the club competing for Turkey's national teams amounted to 155 in 2007. The 2007-2008 budget of the club is TRY 2.2m (about US$1.76m).

== Branches ==
Some of the 30 branches the club sponsors are:

- Athletics (men's, women's)
- Basketball (men's, women's)
- Boxing
- Fencing
- Figure skating
- Football
- Ice hockey (men's, women's)
- Judo
- Karate (men's, women's)
- Skeet and trap
- Taekwondo
- Volleyball (men's, women's)
- Weightlifting (men's. women's)
- Wrestling

== Athletics ==
- Hülya Baştuğ - world-class female mountain runner (2007)
- Meryem Erdoğan (born 1990), female long-distance runner

== Boxing ==
- Nagehan Gül (born 1985), female amateur boxer
- Fatih Keleş (born 1989), 2011 European champion in lightweight division
- Selçuk Eker (born 1991), amateur boxer
- Ayşen Taşkın (born 1996), 2025 Islamic Solidarity Games champion

== Judo ==
- Ayşenur Budak (born 2003)
- Muhammed Demirel (born 2002), 2024 Olympian
- İbrahim Tataroğlu (born 2006), 2024 Olympian

== Karate ==
- Yıldız Aras (born 1977) - World (2000, 2006), European (2000, 2002, 2003, 2004, 2005, 2007, 2009)
- Gülderen Çelik (born 1980) - World (2004), European (2003, 2005, 2007, 2012)
- Hüsniye Gürel - 2008 European female youth champion
- Serap Özçelik (born 1988) - European (2011, 2012)
- Tuba Yenen (born 1991) - European (2013)
- Karate men's team - 2007 European champion

== Taekwondo ==
- Bahri Tanrıkulu (born 1980), 2001, 2007 and 2009 world champion in 87 kg. 2000, 2002 European and 2005 Universiade champion.
- Hatice Kübra Yangın (born 1989), 2011 world female bronze medalist in 53 kg. 2008 and 2010 European, 2011 Summer Universiade champion

== Weightlifting ==
- Berfin Altun (born 1999)
- Sibel Şimşek (born 1984), 2010 European women's weightlifting champion
- Gülnaz Yanık - 2007 European female junior champion

== Other sports ==
- Özlem Becerikli (born 1980), 2012 Paralympics bronze medalist female powerlifter
- Tuğba Karademir (born 1985), first ever Turkish Olympic female figure skater (2006)
- Arzu Özyiğit (born 1972), female basketball player
- Ice hockey men's team - 2007 Turkish Ice Hockey Super League champion
