= BelPa Ice Skating Facility =

Ice skating venue in Ankara, Turkey

- BelPa Buz Pateni Tesisi
- Interactive map of BelPa Ice Skating Facility
- Former names: Bahçelievler Ice Rink, Ankara Ice Skating Palace
- Location: Çankaya, Ankara, Turkey
- Coordinates: 39.91749°N 32.83015°E
- Owner: 1989–2003 General Directorate of Sports; 2003–2020 Ankara Provincial Directorate of Youth and Sports; 2020-present Ankara Metropolitan Municipality
- Operator: BelPa
- Capacity: nearly 1,000
- Surface: floor/ice variable

Construction
- Built: 1984–1989
- Opened: 1989; 37 years ago
- Renovated: 2015, 2020–2024

BelPa Ice Skating Facility (Turkish: BelPa Buz Pateni Tesisi), formerly Bahçelievler Ice Rink (Turkish: Bahçelievler Buz Pisti) or Ankara Ice Skating Palace (Turkish: G.S.İ.M. Buz Pateni Sarayı), is an indoor ice skating and ice hockey arena built 1989 in Ankara, Turkey. The site underwent major expansion and renovation between 2020 and 2024.

== Location ==
BelPa Ice Rink is located at Yukarı Bahçelievler neighborhood Akdeniz Avenue 4/2 in Çankaya, Ankara.

== History ==
The ice skating venue was constructed by the Metropolitan Municipality of Ankara between 1984 and 1989. It was the largest ice rink in Turkey, and had a seating capacity of nearly 1,000. Initially operated by the General Directorate of Sports by the Ministry of Youth and Sports, it was transferred to the Ankara Provincial Directorate of Youth and Sports in 2003. Due to melting ice problems, large-scale maintenance was carried out in 2013. A possible disaster was prevented when it was detected by an inspection in 2015 that the bars of the roof construction were bent and showed metal fatigue. The ice rink was closed five months for repair works.

The ice skating venue was handed over to the Metropolitan Municipality of Ankara on 17 November 2020. It was closed lasting five and a half years for expansion and renovation works to meet the international standards. Mid February 2022, the venue was reopened temporarily for 45 days during partial renovation works. Additionally, an open-air ice skating rink was provided. The venue reopened in late September 2024 after competition of the renovation.

== Events ==
In the 1990s and 2000s, some matches of the Turkish Ice Hockey Super League were played in the venue.

The 2005 IIHF World U18 Championship Division III Qualification matches were held in the arena.

In 2007, the Division III matches of the World Junior Ice Hockey Championships took place in the BelPa Ice Rink, then called Ankara Ice Skating Palace.

The BelPa Ice Skating Hall hosted then Figure Skating Junior Grand Prix Ankara tournament with 127 participants from 36 countries in September 2024.
