= Polis Akademisi ve Koleji S.K. Men's Ice Hockey =

Ice hockey team

Polis Akademisi ve Koleji
- City: Ankara, Turkey
- League: TBHSL
- Founded: 1996
- Operated: 1996–2010
- Dissolved: 2010
- Home arena: Bel-Pa Ice Rink (capacity 1,150)
- Colors
- General manager: Ercüment Yılmaz
- Head coach: Serhat Enyüce
- Captain: Onur Eroğlu

Franchise history
- 1996–2010: Polis Akademisi ve Koleji

Championships
- Regular season titles: 2000–01, 2003–04, 2004–05, 2005–06, 2007–08, 2008–09

The Polis Akademisi ve Koleji Spor Kulübü - Erkekler Buz Hokeyi Takımı (English: Police Academy and College Sports Club - Men's Ice Hockey Team) was an ice hockey team of the Police Academy and College of Turkey. Polis Akademisi ve Koleji S.K. is a major sports club in Ankara. The men's professional ice hockey team participated in the Turkish Ice Hockey Super League, and the women's team in the Turkish Ice Hockey Women's League. The Polis Akademisi folded after the 2010 season as they lost the sponsorship.

== 2009 IIHF Continental Cup ==
The Polis SK qualified for the first round of the IIHF Continental Cup because they were the TBHSL Champions. However, the club did not see the results it wanted as the host, and finished 3rd.

Turkey hosted the first round at the Bel-Pa Ice Rink. Here are the teams that competed and the final results.

2009 Round 1 Continental Cup

Team	Country	W	L	GF	GA
FC Barcelona	(Spain)	3	0	30	3
HC Slavia Sofia	(Bulgaria)	2	1	19	8
Polis Akademisi ve Koleji	(Turkey)	1	2	12	23
Ice Time Herzliya	(Israel)	0	3	6	33
