= Istanbul Paten Kulübü =

İstanbul Paten Kulübü
- City: Istanbul, Turkey
- League: Turkish Hockey 1. Lig
- Founded: 1987
- Home arena: Galleria Ice Rink
- Colors
- General manager: Nacibey Donat
- Head coach: (Turkey) Cengiz Ayyıldız (Turkey) Nacibey Donat

Championships
- Regular season titles: 1997–98

The İstanbul Paten Kulübü (literally: "Istanbul Skating Club") is an ice hockey sports club established 1987 in Istanbul, Turkey. The team participates in the Turkish Hockey SuperLig (TBHSL). Istanbul Paten plays out of the Galleria Ice Rink at Bakırköy, Istanbul. The club's colors are blue, white and red.

The team won the TBHSL championship in the 1997–98 season.
