= Büyükşehir Belediyesi Ankara Spor Kulübü (men's ice hockey) =

B.B. Ankara SK
- City: Ankara, Turkey
- League: Turkish Hockey SuperLig
- Founded: 1990; 36 years ago
- Home arena: Ankara Ice Palace Capacity 1,150
- Colors
- General manager: (Turkey) Kadir Ramazan Coşkun
- Head coach: (Turkey) Tuncay Kılıç

Franchise history
- 1990: Büyükşehir Belediyesi Ankara Spor ulübü

Championships
- Regular season titles: 1992–93, 1993–94, 1994–95, 1996–97, 1999–2000, 2001–02, 2002–03

The Büyükşehir Belediyesi Ankara Spor Kulübü is a professional men's ice hockey team founded in 1990 in Ankara, Turkey that participates in the Turkish Hockey SuperLig (TBHSL). The team plays out of the Ankara Ice Palace.

The men's club has won a record seven league championships, winning its first in the league's inaugural season, 1992–93.

== Season-by-season record ==
Turkish Ice Hockey Super League

| Season | GP | W | L | T | PTS | GF | GA | Finish |
|---|---|---|---|---|---|---|---|---|
| 2008–09 | 10 | 1 | 9 | 0 | 3 | 23 | 145 | 6th (last) |
| 2009–10 | 5 | 1 | 4 | 0 | 3 | 24 | 58 | – |

== Men's roster (2009–2010) ==
| $ | Playert | Nationality | Previous club |
Goaltenders
Defense
