= National Register of Historic Places listings in Itasca County, Minnesota =

Location of Itasca County in Minnesota

This is a list of the National Register of Historic Places listings in Itasca County, Minnesota. It is intended to be a complete list of the properties and districts on the National Register of Historic Places in Itasca County, Minnesota, United States. The locations of National Register properties and districts for which the latitude and longitude coordinates are included below, may be seen in an online map.

There are 20 properties and districts listed on the National Register in the county. A supplementary list includes one additional site that was formerly listed on the National Register.

This National Park Service list is complete through NPS recent listings posted September 12, 2025.

== Current listings ==
	Name on the Register	Image	Date listed	Location	City or town	Description
1	Bigfork Village Hall	Bigfork Village Hall	October 17, 2012 (#12000871)	200 Main Ave. 47°44′38″N 93°39′17″W	Bigfork	Fieldstone municipal hall built in 1936 with Works Progress Administration funds to provide a much-needed government and community center.
2	Bovey Village Hall	Bovey Village Hall	August 15, 1991 (#91001059)	402 2nd St. 47°17′43″N 93°24′58″W	Bovey	Well-preserved example of a municipal hall built with federal assistance during the Great Depression, constructed 1934–5. Further noted as one of Minnesota's first Public Works Administration projects and for its eclectic period revival architecture.
3	Canisteo District General Office Building	Canisteo District General Office Building	April 22, 1982 (#82002970)	200 Cole Ave. 47°17′11″N 93°25′26″W	Coleraine	1908 brick office building, representative of mining company towns throughout the Mesabi Range. Demolished in the summer of 2013 by the City of Coleraine and the Greenway School District.
4	Central School	Central School	August 16, 1977 (#77000746)	10 NW 5th St. 47°14′11″N 93°31′45″W	Grand Rapids	Landmark Richardsonian Romanesque school in use for 77 years; one of the first high schools in northern Minnesota outside of Duluth upon its completion in 1895, and one of the only intact 19th-century buildings remaining in Grand Rapids.
5	Church of the Good Shepherd	Church of the Good Shepherd	August 11, 1980 (#80002081)	601 Cole Ave. 47°17′14″N 93°25′46″W	Coleraine	Finely crafted log church built in 1908 by U.S. Steel as a religious and social center for its managerial class, reflecting the strict social hierarchy maintained by the mining companies and the lavish support for those in the upper ranks.
6	Coleraine Carnegie Library	Coleraine Carnegie Library	July 17, 1980 (#80002080)	203 Cole Ave. 47°17′14″N 93°25′28″W	Coleraine	Carnegie library built in Neoclassical style in 1912 to educate and acculturate immigrant mine workers and their families; emblematic of the corporate paternalism of the region's iron mining companies.
7	Coleraine City Hall	Coleraine City Hall	June 18, 1992 (#92000800)	302 Roosevelt Ave. 47°17′19″N 93°25′30″W	Coleraine	Renaissance Revival municipal hall built in 1910 to house Coleraine's government offices, fire department, jail, and auditorium as the community evolved from a mining company town to an incorporated village.
8	Coleraine Methodist Episcopal Church	Coleraine Methodist Episcopal Church	April 22, 1982 (#82002971)	501 Cole Ave. 47°17′14″N 93°25′41″W	Coleraine	Largest church on the western Mesabi Range, built 1908–9 with a lower-level YMCA. Significant as a major example of Shingle style architecture in northern Minnesota and a key element of the planned community of Coleraine.
9	General Superintendent's House	General Superintendent's House	April 22, 1982 (#82002972)	Cole Ave. 47°17′11″N 93°25′22″W	Coleraine	Large 1911 frame house representative of mining company housing for managers.
10	Frank Gran Farmstead		April 22, 1982 (#82002969)	County Highway 10; 47°12′22″N 93°18′21″W	La Prairie vicinity	Early-20th-century farm of a prosperous Finnish immigrant, representing Itasca County's few substantial agricultural operations in a post-logging region more characterized by subsistence farms.
11	Hartley Sugar Camp		April 22, 1982 (#82002973)	Off County Highway 10; 47°15′39″N 93°23′55″W	Bovey vicinity	Maple syruping complex with four log buildings constructed 1904–5 and a lodge built in 1909, a unique example of the hobby farms established by the era's wealthy Minnesotans.
12	Hill Annex Mine	Hill Annex Mine	August 1, 1986 (#86002126)	Off U.S. Route 169; 47°19′51″N 93°16′26″W	Calumet vicinity	Open-pit iron mine complex established in 1912, one of the most productive on the Mesabi Range, whose surviving buildings illustrate the early mining process.
13	Marcell Ranger Station	Marcell Ranger Station	May 19, 1994 (#94000473)	49554 State Highway 38; 47°35′46″N 93°41′14″W	Marcell Township	Well-preserved U.S. Forest Service administrative complex with five log structures built 1934–35, noted for its association with the expansion and development of Chippewa National Forest during the New Deal and for its fine National Park Service rustic architecture.
14	Old Cut Foot Sioux Ranger Station	Old Cut Foot Sioux Ranger Station	August 7, 1974 (#74001026)	Hatchery Rd. in Chippewa National Forest; 47°30′56″N 94°02′02″W	Squaw Lake vicinity	One of the United States' oldest surviving National Forest ranger stations, built in 1904. Maintained as a visitor attraction.
15	Oliver Boarding House	Oliver Boarding House	April 22, 1982 (#82002977)	Jessie St. 47°19′18″N 93°18′08″W	Marble	Only boarding house operated by the Oliver Iron Mining Company remaining in the western Mesabi Range, built circa 1909 to address the constant housing shortages caused by the influx of mine workers.
16	Scenic State Park CCC/Rustic Style Service Yard	Scenic State Park CCC/Rustic Style Service Yard	June 8, 1992 (#92000595)	56956 Scenic Highway 7; 47°42′16″N 93°33′47″W	Bigfork vicinity	Four structures built 1934–35, the only all-log support facilities remaining in a Minnesota state park. Also significant as examples of New Deal federal work relief, state park development, and National Park Service rustic architecture.
17	Scenic State Park CCC/WPA/Rustic Style Historic Resources	Scenic State Park CCC/WPA/Rustic Style Historic Resources	June 8, 1992 (#89001670)	56956 Scenic Highway 7; 47°43′14″N 93°34′10″W	Bigfork vicinity	Six park facilities built 1934–35 (including one with original furniture and paintings) significant as examples of New Deal federal work relief, state park development, and National Park Service rustic log architecture.
18	Turtle Oracle Mound	Turtle Oracle Mound	August 27, 1974 (#74001027)	Address restricted	Squaw Lake vicinity	Rare intaglio (inverse mound), shaped like a turtle, commemorating battles between the Dakota and Ojibwe in the 18th century.
19	White Oak Point Site	White Oak Point Site	October 18, 1972 (#72000677)	Address restricted	Zemple vicinity	Northern Minnesota's first deeply stratified archaeological site—a river terrace inhabited since 5000 BCE, with multiple burial mounds and the sites of a late-18th/early-19th-century trading post and an 1868 Ojibwe reservation.
20	Winnibigoshish Lake Dam	Winnibigoshish Lake Dam	May 11, 1982 (#82004629)	County Highway 9 at the Mississippi River; 47°25′45″N 94°03′07″W	Inger vicinity	Dam built 1899–1900, associated with the first and largest of the reservoirs created in the region as a federal project to control the flow of the Upper Mississippi River. Extends into Cass County.

== Former listings ==
	Name on the Register	Image	Date listed	Date removed	Location	City or town	Description
1	Itasca Lumber Company Superintendent's House		April 22, 1982 (#82002976)	February 4, 2019	506 5th St. S.E. 47°19′39″N 93°47′16″W	Deer River	1904 employee residence, the best surviving reminder of the region's largest lumber company, which played a major role in the development of Deer River and western Itasca County. Demolished circa 2011.

== See also ==
- List of National Historic Landmarks in Minnesota
- National Register of Historic Places listings in Minnesota
