= Jim Troumbly =

American ice hockey player (1928–2021)

James Floyd Troumbly (June 19, 1928 – December 3, 2021) was an American hockey player. Born in Taconite, Minnesota, he was the fourth-oldest child among ten children of Gabriel and Ethel Troumbly. Troumbly was one of seven hockey-playing sons, all of whom played for the hometown Taconite Hornets, a senior amateur squad in northeastern Minnesota. Troumbly also played for Team USA in the 1950 Men's World Championship, in which Team USA placed 2nd overall.

== Amateur Hockey Career ==
Troumbly, nicknamed “Slim” for his slight stature, started playing senior amateur hockey in 1941 at the age of 14 while working hard physically during the day on his burgeoning construction business. Troumbly attended the local school through 9th grade but did not enter or graduate from Greenway High School in Coleraine, Minnesota, despite other family members graduating.

In 1941, Troumbly competed in his first outside competition when his older brother, Ken, to him along to play in a senior amateur game with the Taconite Hornets. Troumbly played well against his older competitors. His brother Ken would go on to play for the University of Minnesota. Troumbly continued to play senior amateur hockey as a teenager.

Troumbly played with the Taconite Hornets until 1945. Subsequently, for four seasons, Troumbly played for the Eagle River Falcons, a leading amateur team in the Wisconsin, Michigan, and Ontario Hockey League, where he was the leading scorer each season. In 1949, he was given a two-week tryout with the Detroit Reg Wings, at the time a notable achievement in itself for an American player.

In 1950 and 1952, Troumbly was invited to try out for both the Men's World Championship and U.S. Olympic Hockey Team.

In the 1950s, Troumbly played for the Hibbing Flyers hockey team of the Northern Amateur League, where he was the top scorer and helped lead the team to the 1953 National Senior “A” Amateur title. In 1955, he led the Taconite Hornets to their first state Amateur title. Troumbly also captured the tourney scoring title (breaking the state record at the time), was named to the all-tourney team and won the Most Valuable Player award. Troumbly continued to be among the scoring leaders of the Taconite Hornets and were contenders in the Arrowhead League. At one point, the team won seven straight league championships, where Troumbly was a captain on those teams, eventually helping those teams win the 1962 and 1965 Minnesota State Amateur Titles. At age 39, Troumbly helped the Hornets with its fourth state title and second place in the National Senior Tourney in 1968. In the following year, Taconite won the National Senior Intermediate Championship in Troumbly's last year of competitive play.

== International Play ==
Troumbly received an invitation to compete on the United States National team and flew to London to compete in the 1950 World / European Ice Hockey Championships in Wembley, England. A forward on that team, Troumbly would help his team to a runner-up finish to the Canadian Hockey team. Troumbly led in scoring as a centerman for not one but two lines. Troumbly scored three goals and four assists against the Netherlands (USA 17-Netherlands 1). In the following game with Switzerland, Troumbly scored six goals within nine minutes (USA 10-Switzerland 5). For the championship, Troumbly scored 12 goals with four assists in 7 games played. At the request of Connie Pleban, Troumbly was invited to try out for the 1952 U.S. Olympic team that competed in Helsinki, Finland. At the time, Troumbly was formally starting his construction business with his brothers, known as the Troumbly Brothers Construction. Troumbly would not play again internationally.

== Playing Style ==
Troumbly played at 5’8” and about 150 pounds. Despite his relatively small size, Troumbly was a tough player and a solid all-around performer. He was known as an unselfish player with imaginative play-making skills He was noted for pinpoint passing accuracy and his clever, deft stickhandling. He was an “assist” man as his ability to set up teammates for goals was “legendary”. Most prominent was his ability to anticipate the play and be in the right position at the right time. A left-handed shot, Troumbly was known to pass up prime scoring opportunities to give another player a better chance to score. Troumbly was extremely strong on his skates and could handle rough play. Never a “dirty” player, he did know how to protect himself and was the object of a lot of attention from opposition defenders. Troumbly developed a unique shooting style called the “kick-shot” and was his specialty. At the time it was notorious in that it was a strong shot that had little control for placement, however, Troumbly was able to implement the shot to much success. The Kick-shot was later declared illegal by USA Hockey's predecessor.

== Coaching career ==
While playing for the Taconite Hornets, Troumbly also found time to be a coach to the youth of Taconite and the Greenway Raiders youth program. He coached the Greenway Bantam “A” team from 1971 to 1979 and was named the “Coach of the Year” in 1973 for his services by MAHA. In 1975, his team was the Minnesota State Runner-up. Over the years, he was a source of advice and Council for many who grew from the Greenway Hockey program who have gone to college, professional, and international competition. Troumbly often worked with long time Greenway High School Coach and Arena Manager Bob Gernander. Bob was quoted as saying Troumbly “was an excellent student of the game and demanded a ‘team-first’ effort as a captain, a teammate, and a coach”.

== Contributions to Area Hockey ==
In the late 1950s, there was momentum to build an indoor hockey facility to house both the Greenway Raiders Hockey Program and the local Taconite Hornets team. Due to the proximity of the High School's location to available properties, it was decided that the arena would be built in Coleraine, Minnesota. Construction began in 1960 with Troumbly's company Troumbly Brothers Construction providing a bulk of the construction services, completing the project in 1962. Troumbly Brothers Construction not only was the prime contractor but also donate significant time and money back to the project. Witnesses at the time attested to the fact that the Troumbly and his brothers could be seen working on the facility before their Hornets games in Taconite.

== Influence on the Community ==
Throughout his playing career, Troumbly coached and played with many individuals who would later contribute greatly to the game of Hockey regionally, nationally, and internationally.

Rube Bjorkman – a teammate with Troumbly on the Taconite Hornets, spoke of Troumbly in the following letter “I played with (Troumbly) on the Taconite Hornets from 1955 to 1963. There was not a better Senior A hockey player in Minnesota during that period of time…Youth hockey players in the Greenway School area were motivated by all who came in contact with him through hockey…and I rank Slimmy with the best of the complete hockey players I have known."

Bob Gernander – a hockey coach and NHL scout, in 2007 spoke of Troumbly's athleticism and style of play with the following “At a time prior to strong television coverage, Troumbly was a player that all could emulate. His create and unselfish style of play was a model for all at an important transitional period of the game. I was personally influenced by Troumbly and credit him with developing many of the tactics and philosophies that I used as a High School, Junior and Pro coach. I still find his influence important in my present job evaluating talent for the NHL.”

Chuck Grillo – a former amateur player and teammate of Troumbly's during his time with the Hibbing Flyers, spoke of Troumbly in comparison with Igor Larionov in the style of play. Chuck wrote in an online article, “Igor Larionov could thread a puck through bodies and sticks to the weak side of the net for a tap-in goal… Actually, I learned as much about this from an old iron-ranger named Slim Troumbly, who played the game like Larionov. This guy could have played in the NHL when there were only six teams. Troumbly said, ‘Chuck, most players are worried about catching the puck and handling it. That should be a given if they’ve practiced it over and over. Why, when they can make the game simple, wouldn’t they think about giving it to someone else before it hits their stick, go to a hole and get it back? That’s how simple the game is.’ ””

Mike Antonovich – a former professional hockey player, grew up idolizing Troumbly “Slim” Troumbly. Mike was quoted about Troumbly, “He could pass, he could score, he could skate. I want to be just like him.”
