= Greenway High School (Minnesota) =

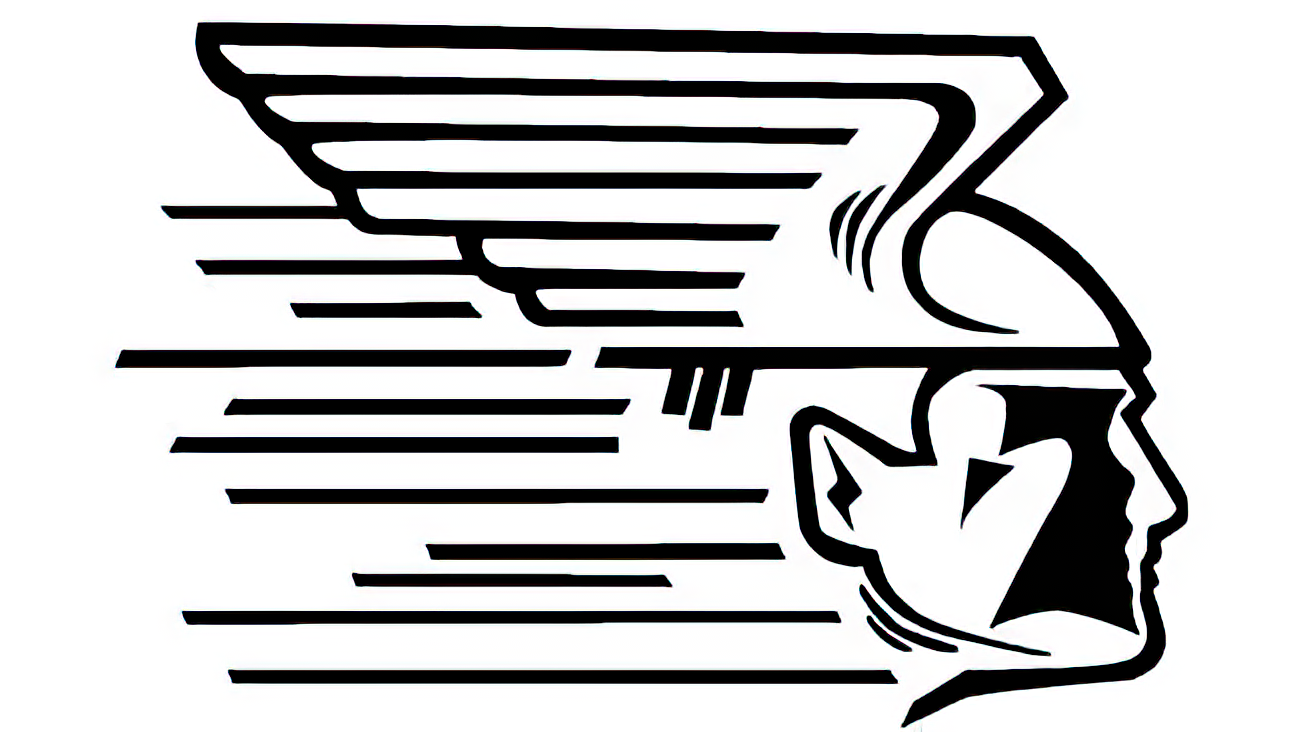

Location
- 308 Roosevelt Ave; Coleraine, Minnesota 55722; United States; 47°17′18″N 93°28′44″W

Information
- Type: Public high school
- Established: 1919
- School district: Independent School District 316
- Dean: Dan Mell
- Principal: Jeff Britten
- Teaching staff: 21.03 (FTE)
- Grades: 5 - 12
- Enrollment: 298 (2023-2024)
- Student to teacher ratio: 21.03
- Colors: Green & white
- Mascot: Raiders
- Rival: Grand Rapids Thunderhawks
- Yearbook: The Blast
- Website: ghs.isd316.org

Greenway High School is a public secondary school located in Coleraine, Minnesota. It is a part of the Independent School District 316. It was named after John Campbell Greenway, a mining engineer and United States Senator. The high school enrolls students, grade 5 through grade 12, from LaPrairie, Coleraine, Bovey, Taconite, Marble, Calumet, Pengilly, Trout Lake Township, Iron Range Township, Greenway Township, Lawrence Lake Township and Nashwauk Township.

== History ==
Greenway High School started construction in 1920 and was completed in 1922. The school was named after John Campbell Greenway, an American businessman and senior officer of the US Army Reserve. The new school had a pool, a cafeteria, hospital rooms, administrative rooms, and a motion picture machine room. The auditorium/gymnasium was on the ground floor, and a garage with space for up to 8 buses and area for mechanical work on the buses. The third floor housed classrooms, the school library and was the location for the Itasca State Junior College (later moving location to the nearby town of Grand Rapids in 1966).

In the summer of 1955, the elementary school was demolished to make room for the new addition of the school that would include a gymnasium on the ground floor, and a band and choir room in the sub-basement. This was completed in 1957. A new elementary school was constructed across the street and would be connected by an underground tunnel. The new elementary school housed grades Kindergarten-6th grade and was named the VanDyke Elementary School (named after former Superintendent J.A VanDyke).

With the nearby middle school (Connor-Jasper Middle School) closing after the end 2011–2012 school year, grades 6-9 were moved to the high school. A new cafeteria was constructed (which could also be used as a gymnasium).

== Academics ==
Greenway High School offers traditional secondary school options for college preparatory and technical-based learning through traditional and distance learning methods. A small variety of advanced placement classes, as well as opportunities to do post-secondary work at Itasca Community College near Grand Rapids, Minnesota. In recent year, specific classes have become available that give students that chance to explore career pathways for education, healthcare, and business.

== Athletics ==
Greenway High School sponsors boys' and girls' sports programs, referred to as the Greenway Raiders. During state tournaments for the various sports, the school is often referred to as Greenway of Coleraine. In recent years, due to declining enrollment, some programs — namely football — form cooperative teams with neighboring school districts with similar enrollment challenges. Both the boys' and girls' cross country and track and field teams combine with neighboring Nashwauk-Keewatin, while the girls' hockey team competes with nearby Grand Rapids. Often in these types of arrangements, a unique (and neutral) nickname is chosen to reflect the shared nature of the schools participating: the football team, and both the boy's and girls' cross country and track and field teams, for example, are called the GNK Titans; the girls' hockey team is referred to as the GRG Lightning. In some cases, however, combined athletic teams do not have a name that reflects the dual nature of the participating schools. The boys' hockey team includes students from Nashwauk-Keewatin and Deer River but is still referred to simply as the Greenway Raiders.

== Arts/music ==
Greenway High School offers a number of opportunities for students to be involved with the arts and/or music. The high school offers two choir ensembles, two band ensembles, and multiple art classes. The two choir ensembles are the "Concert Choir" and the "Raider Singers". The Concert Choir is non-audition based that any student grades 9-12 can participate in. The Raider Singers is reserved for only those in grades 10-12 and is auditioned based (note: if you do not pass the audition for Raider Singers, you can still participate with the Concert Choir). The two band ensembles are the "Symphonic Band" and the "Jazz Band". Both the Symphonic Band and Jazz Band are offered for any student in grades 9-12 and are non-auditioned based. In the past, the Symphonic band was reserved for those in grades 10-12 and there was a separate band called the "Concert Band" for students in ninth grade. Starting for the 2019–2020 school year and forward, the Concert Band combined into the Symphonic Band allowing students grades 9–12 to play in one band. With the Concert Band disbanded, there was room for a new Jazz Band ensemble in the school scheduling (first time in many years there was a Jazz Band ensemble offered at Greenway High School). Starting for the 2019–2020 school year and forward, a drumline (formerly the marching band), is an extracurricular activity associated with the high school bands that students in grades 9-12 can participate in. There are a number of art classes offered at Greenway high school, including: media arts, drawing, sculpting, interior design, painting, and more. Starting in the 2020–2021 school year, a new art club was created. It is an after-school activity that high school students are able to participate in.

== Notable alumni ==
- Mike Peluso - Former NHL Hockey Player and Stanley Cup Champion
- Mike Antonovich - Former Professional NHL and WHA Hockey Player
- Ken Gernander - Former Professional NHL Player
