= Andy Sertich =

American ice hockey player

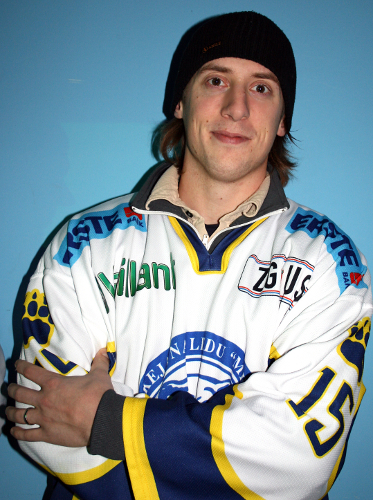
- Born: May 6, 1983 (age 43) Coleraine, Minnesota, U.S.
- Height: 6 ft 0 in (183 cm)
- Weight: 183 lb (83 kg; 13 st 1 lb)
- Position: Defense
- Shot: Left
- Played for: Utah Grizzlies; Bridgeport Sound Tigers; KHL Medveščak; Graz 99ers Alba Volán Székesfehérvár; Dornbirner EC; Stavanger Oilers; Nottingham Panthers
- National team: Croatia
- NHL draft: 136th overall, 2002; Pittsburgh Penguins
- Playing career: 2006–2017

Andy Sertich (born May 6, 1983) is a former American-Croatian professional ice hockey player whose final team before retirement in 2017 was the Nottingham Panthers of the British EIHL.

== Playing career ==
As an amateur he played hockey for one of the strongest American collegiate teams the University of Minnesota. Through four years of playing with the Gophers his teammates were today's stars such as Thomas Vanek, Paul Martin and Phil Kessel. In the four years of playing in the WCHA Sertich played 171 games with 27 goals and 39 assists. Sertich was selected in the 2002 NHL entry draft 136th overall by the Pittsburgh Penguins, though he never played for them. In the 2008–09 season he played for the ECHL League team Utah Grizzlies, where in over 62 games he scored 12 goals and had 24 assists, which saw him as the best defender on his team by points. Along with Utah, he played 6 games for the Bridgeport Sound Tigers of the American Hockey League, the second strongest league in the North American continent.

On May 28, 2009, with eligibility to play for the Croatian national team, Sertich left America signing a one-year contract with Croat team KHL Medveščak for the 2009–10 season. In 54 games Sertich scored 8 goals for 34 points to lead all Medveščak Zagreb defensemen in points and was re-signed to a one-year extension on April 1, 2010.

After splitting the 2013–14 season with the Graz 99ers and Alba Volán Székesfehérvár Sertich joined as a free agent, his fourth EBEL club, Dornbirner EC on June 16, 2014.

After six seasons in the EBEL, Sertich left as a free agent for a new European opportunity in agreeing to a one-year contract with Norwegian club, Stavanger Oilers of the GET-ligaen on July 23, 2015.

In 2013, Sertich played for the Croatian national team at the IIHF World Championship Division II.

== Career statistics ==
=== Regular season and playoffs ===
			Regular season					Playoffs
Season	Team	League	GP	G	A	Pts	PIM	GP	G	A	Pts	PIM
2000–01	Greenway High School	HSMN	31	35	45	80	14	—	—	—	—	—
2001–02	Greenway High School	HSMN	26	24	48	72	35	—	—	—	—	—
2001–02	Sioux Falls Stampede	USHL	13	2	4	6	0	2	0	0	0	2
2002–03	University of Minnesota	WCHA	44	5	8	13	12	—	—	—	—	—
2003–04	University of Minnesota	WCHA	43	8	14	22	14	—	—	—	—	—
2004–05	University of Minnesota	WCHA	43	6	9	15	8	—	—	—	—	—
2005–06	University of Minnesota	WCHA	41	8	8	16	22	—	—	—	—	—
2006–07	Utah Grizzlies	ECHL	72	7	40	47	41	—	—	—	—	—
2007–08	Utah Grizzlies	ECHL	29	3	14	17	8	—	—	—	—	—
2007–08	Bridgeport Sound Tigers	AHL	28	3	6	9	4	—	—	—	—	—
2008–09	Bridgeport Sound Tigers	AHL	6	0	0	0	0	—	—	—	—	—
2008–09	Utah Grizzlies	ECHL	62	12	24	36	34	5	0	1	1	4
2009–10	KHL Medveščak Zagreb	EBEL	54	8	26	34	8	11	1	4	5	2
2009–10	KHL Medveščak Zagreb II	CRO	—	—	—	—	—	1	0	0	0	0
2010–11	KHL Medveščak Zagreb	EBEL	54	10	21	31	22	5	2	1	3	2
2010–11	KHL Medveščak Zagreb II	CRO	—	—	—	—	—	1	1	1	2	0
2011–12	KHL Medveščak Zagreb	EBEL	49	11	22	33	10	9	0	0	0	4
2011–12	KHL Medveščak Zagreb II	CRO	—	—	—	—	—	2	1	1	2	0
2012–13	KHL Medveščak Zagreb	EBEL	54	12	31	43	25	6	3	2	5	2
2013–14	Graz 99ers	EBEL	17	2	3	5	4	—	—	—	—	—
2013–14	SAPA Fehérvár AV19	EBEL	35	8	20	28	6	4	0	2	2	2
2014–15	Dornbirner EC	EBEL	54	4	22	26	20	—	—	—	—	—
2015–16	Stavanger Oilers	NOR	45	5	29	34	4	17	1	4	5	2
2016–17	Nottingham Panthers	EIHL	51	5	20	25	18	2	0	0	0	0
ECHL totals			160	22	78	100	83	5	0	1	1	4
AHL totals			34	3	3	6	9	—	—	—	—	—
EBEL totals			317	55	145	200	95	35	6	9	15	12

=== International ===
Year	Team	Event	GP	G	A	Pts	PIM
2012	Croatia	WC D2A	5	7	5	12	0
2013	Croatia	OGQ	2	0	0	0	0
2013	Croatia	WC D2A	5	1	5	6	2
2015	Croatia	WC D1B	5	1	4	5	2
2017	Croatia	WC D1B	5	2	1	3	0
Senior totals			22	11	15	26	4
