= 2013 IIHF World Championship Division II =

Tournament details
- Host countries: Croatia; Turkey
- Venues: 2 (in 2 host cities)
- Dates: 14 – 20 April; 21 – 27 April
- Teams: 12

The 2013 IIHF World Championship Division II was a pair of international Ice hockey tournaments run by the International Ice Hockey Federation. Group A was contested in Zagreb, Croatia, running from 14 to 20 April 2013 and Group B was contested in İzmit, Turkey, running from 21 to 27 April 2013. Divisions II A and II B represent the fourth and the fifth tier of the Ice Hockey World Championships.

== Division II A ==
2013 IIHF World Championship Division II A
Tournament details
- Host country: Croatia
- Venue: 1 (in 1 host city)
- Dates: 14 – 20 April 2013
- Teams: 6

Tournament statistics
- Games played: 15
- Goals scored: 97 (6.47 per game)
- Attendance: 13,367 (891 per game)

=== Participants ===
Team	Qualification
Australia	placed 6th in 2012 Division I B and were relegated
Spain	placed 2nd in 2012
Croatia	hosts, placed 3rd in 2012
Iceland	placed 4th in 2012
Serbia	placed 5th in 2012
Belgium	placed 1st in 2012 Division II B and were promoted

=== Officials ===
Referees

- (France) Alexandre Bourreau
- (Hungary) Gergely Kincses
- (Italy) Daniel Gamper
- (Switzerland) Marc Wiegand

Linesmen

- (Austria) Florian Hofer
- (Belarus) Andrei Haurylenka
- (China) Cao Jian
- (Croatia) Trpimir Piragić
- (Croatia) Marko Saković
- (United Kingdom) James Kavanagh
- (Romania) Mihai-Ariel Trandafir

=== Final standings ===
Team	Pld	W	OTW	OTL	L	GF	GA	GD	Pts	Promotion or relegation
Croatia	5	5	0	0	0	27	8	+19	15	Promoted to the 2014 Division I B
Belgium	5	3	0	0	2	15	13	+2	9	
Iceland	5	2	1	0	2	16	16	0	8	
Australia	5	2	0	1	2	13	13	0	7	
Serbia	5	2	0	0	3	14	21	−7	6	
Spain	5	0	0	0	5	12	26	−14	0	Relegated to the 2014 Division II B

Source: IIHF

=== Results ===
All times are local (CEST – UTC+2).

14 April 2013; 13:00	Belgium	4–1 (2–0, 1–1, 1–0)	Iceland	Dom Sportova, Zagreb; Attendance: 65

Game reference

Bjorn Steijlen
Goalies
Dennis Hedström
Referee:
(France) Alexandre Bourreau
Linesmen:
(United Kingdom) James Kavanagh
(Romania) Mihai-Ariel Trandafir

B. Vercammen (V. Morgan) – 11:25	1–0
J. Raekelboom (M. Morgan, V. Gyesbreghs) – 17:11	2–0
	2–1	30:50 – E. Alengaard (U. Andresson)
M. Morgan (V. Morgan, D. Geerts) – 35:49	3–1
J. Engelen (V. Morgan) – 40:15	4–1

12 min
Penalties
12 min
50
Shots
29

14 April 2013; 16:30	Croatia	3–1 (1–1, 1–0, 1–0)	Australia	Dom Sportova, Zagreb; Attendance: 1,500

Game reference

Mate Tomljenović
Goalies
Anthony Kimlin
Referee:
(Hungary) Gergely Kincses
Linesmen:
(Belarus) Andrei Haurylenka
(Austria) Florian Hofer

	0–1	01:18 – W. Darge (D. Corstens)
D. Kanaet (M. Blagus, B. Rendulić) – 13:32	1–1
J. Prpic (J. Hecimovic) (PP) – 21:30	2–1
J. Hecimovic (A. Sertich) (PP) – 56:39	3–1

8 min
Penalties
6 min
42
Shots
23

14 April 2013; 20:15	Spain	3–4 (1–1, 1–1, 1–2)	Serbia	Dom Sportova, Zagreb; Attendance: 150

Game reference

Luis Sokolov
Goalies
Milan Luković
Referee:
(Switzerland) Marc Wiegand
Linesmen:
(Croatia) Trpimir Piragič
(Croatia) Marko Sakovič

O. Boronat (E. Paz, P. Muñoz) (PP) – 14:22	1–0
	1–1	18:38 – M. Sretović (M. Brkušanin) (PP)
	1–2	36:50 – M. Brkušanin (M. Milovanović, N. Janković) (PP)
J. García Arias (PS) – 37:01	2–2
	2–3	46:24 – N. Janković (M. Sretović, A. Luković)
	2–4	49:09 – A. Despotović (N. Vučurević, D. Filipović)
O. Boronat (P. Puyuelo) – 51:54	3–4

18 min
Penalties
10 min
31
Shots
32

15 April 2013; 13:00	Australia	2–3 GWS (1–2, 0–0, 1–0) (OT 0–0) (SO: 0–1)	Iceland	Dom Sportova, Zagreb; Attendance: 63

Game reference

Anthony Kimlin
Goalies
Dennis Hedstrom
Referee:
(Switzerland) Marc Wiegand
Linesmen:
(Croatia) Trpimir Piragič
(Romania) Mihai-Ariel Trandafir

	0–1	04:51 – R. Pålsson (E. Alengaard, J. Gislason) (PP2)
	0–2	06:24 – P. Maack (E. Alengaard, B. Sigurðarson) (PP)
C. Todd (L. Webster) (PP) – 07:49	1–2
D. Corstens (S. Wilson, J. Kyros) – 49:34	2–2

T. Powell (miss)
L. Webster (miss)
W. Darge (miss)
W. Darge (miss)
Shootout
(miss) E. Alengaard
(miss) R. Hedstrom
(miss) J. Gislason
E. Alengaard
12 min
Penalties
8 min
27
Shots
31

15 April 2013; 16:30	Serbia	0–4 (0–1, 0–0, 0–3)	Belgium	Dom Sportova, Zagreb; Attendance: 114

Game reference

Milan Luković
Goalies
Bjorn Steijlen
Referee:
(Hungary) Gergely Kincses
Linesmen:
(China) Cao Jian
(Austria) Florian Hofer

0–1	14:04 – J. Engelen (V. Morgan, D. Geerts)
0–2	43:19 – B. Vercammen (M. Morgan)
0–3	49:34 – J. Vercammen (J. Raekelboom, B. Vercammen)
0–4	53:19 – M. Morgan (V. Gyesbreghs, J. Engelen) (PP)

10 min
Penalties
18 min
30
Shots
34

15 April 2013; 20:15	Spain	2–6 (0–4, 1–1, 1–1)	Croatia	Dom Sportova, Zagreb; Attendance: 2,500

Game reference

Luis Sokolov
Bruno González
Goalies
Mate Tomljenović
Referee:
(Italy) Daniel Gamper
Linesmen:
(Belarus) Andrei Haurylenka
(United Kingdom) James Kavanaghq

	0–1	08:22 – J. Prpic (J. Hecimovic)
	0–2	10:54 – J. Hecimovic (M. Lovrenčić, J. Prpic)
	0–3	13:08 – B. Rendulić (M. Lovrenčić) (SH)
	0–4	16:18 – J. Hecimovic (M. Novak, J. Prpic) (PP)
P. González (P. Puyuelo) (SH) – 27:56	1–4
	1–5	38:27 – M. Novak (J. Prpic, A. Sertich) (PP)
P. González (SH) – 46:17	2–5
	2–6	55:17 – J. Prpic (M. Lovrenčić, I. Jacmenjak) (SH)

20 min
Penalties
16 min
23
Shots
39

17 April 2013; 13:00	Australia	3–5 (1–2, 0–3, 2–0)	Serbia	Dom Sportova, Zagreb; Attendance: 52

Game reference

Anthony Kimlin
Goalies
Arsenije Ranković
Referee:
(Italy) Daniel Gamper
Linesmen:
(Belarus) Andrei Haurylenka
(Croatia) Marko Saković

	0–1	16:49 – M. Brkušanin (R. Sabadoš, N. Janković) (PP)
L. Webster (T. Powell) – 19:16	1–1
	1–2	19:45 – M. Sretović (M. Milovanović, N. Janković)
	1–3	23:16 – S. Ristić (M. Babić, N. Raković)
	1–4	28:28 – M. Milovanović (M. Sretović, M. Brkušanin)
	1–5	36:42 – A. Luković (N. Vučurević, M. Sretović) (EA)
T. Powell (T. Graham, L. Webster) (PP2) – 56:39	2–5
S. Stephenson (D. Corstens) – 59:49	3–5

16 min
Penalties
22 min
55
Shots
28

17 April 2013; 16:30	Spain	3–6 (0–3, 0–1, 3–2)	Belgium	Dom Sportova, Zagreb; Attendance: 123

Game reference

Bjorn Steijlen
Goalies
Bruno González
Luis Sokolov
Referee:
(France) Alexandre Bourreau
Linesmen:
(United Kingdom) James Kavanagh
(Croatia) Trpimir Piragić

	0–1	17:33 – M. Morgan (V. Morgan, D. Geerts)
	0–2	18:39 – V. Morgan
	0–3	19:30 – L. Maas (J. Raekelboom, B. Vercammen
	0–4	26:36 – V. Morgan (M. Morgan, N. de Herdt
P. Muñoz (O. Boronat, J. García Arias) (PP2) – 40:44	1–4
P. González (J. Brabo, P. Puyuelo) (PP) – 41:07	2–4
	2–5	50:28 – V. Morgan (M. Morgan)
	2–6	52:10 – D. Geerts (V. Morgan, N. de Herdt)
Z. Martínez (J. Brabo) – 52:57	3–6

8 min
Penalties
12 min
33
Shots
40

17 April 2013; 20:15	Croatia	6–1 (1–0, 0–0, 5–1)	Iceland	Dom Sportova, Zagreb; Attendance: 1,428

Game reference

Mate Tomljenović
Goalies
Dennis Hedstrom
Snorri Sigurbergsson
Referee:
(Hungary) Gergely Kincses
Linesmen:
(China) Cao Jian
(Austria) Florian Hofer

A. Sertich (J. Hecimovic, M. Lovrenčić) – 14:32	1–0
M. Blagus (D. Kanaet, J. Hecimovic) – 43:38	2–0
M. Lovrenčić (I. Jacmenjak, A. Sertich) – 48:24	3–0
D. Kanaet – 49:58	4–0
J. Hecimovic (A. Sertich, J. Prpic) – 52:03	5–0
T. Čunko (M. Novak) – 56:48	6–0
	6–1	58:05 – E. Alengaard (B. Sigurðarson)

10 min
Penalties
6 min
49
Shots
16

19 April 2013; 13:00	Iceland	6–3 (1–1, 1–1, 4–1)	Spain	Dom Sportova, Zagreb; Attendance: 80

Game reference

Dennis Hedstrom
Goalies
Bruno González
Referee:
(Italy) Daniel Gamper
Linesmen:
(China) Cao Jian
(Romania) Mihai-Ariel Trandafir

	0–1	15:43 – Z. Martínez (A. Vea, S. Barnola)
B. Sigurðarson (O. Blondal, E. Alengaard) (PP) – 17:39	1–1
B. Bergmann – 23:59	2–1
	2–2	36:26 – P. González (J. Muñoz, P. Puyuelo)
R. Pålsson (O. Bjornsson, J. Leifsson) (PP) – 44:14	3–2
O. Bjornsson (R. Hedstrom, J. Gislason) – 45:55	4–2
	4–3	49:18 – P. Puyuelo (J. Muñoz, P. González)
R. Hedstrom (O. Bjornsson) – 57:55	5–3
O. Blondal (ENG) – 59:26	6–3

16 min
Penalties
8 min
22
Shots
34

19 April 2013; 16:30	Belgium	1–3 (0–1, 1–0, 0–2)	Australia	Dom Sportova, Zagreb; Attendance: 169

Game reference

Bjorn Steijlen
Mike Jansen
Goalies
Anthony Kimlin
Referee:
(France) Alexandre Bourreau
Linesmen:
(Croatia) Trpimir Piragić
(Croatia) Marko Saković

	0–1	18:19 – T. Stephenson (C. Todd, S. Stephenson)
J. Vercammen (J. Raekelboom, B. Vercammen) – 23:50	1–1
	1–2	45:51 – D. Corstens (C. Todd)
	1–3	50:05 – D. Corstens (W. Cliff)

6 min
Penalties
6 min
42
Shots
25

19 April 2013; 20:15	Serbia	4–6 (0–2, 3–3, 1–1)	Croatia	Dom Sportova, Zagreb; Attendance: 3,217

Game reference

Milan Luković
Goalies
Mate Tomljenović
Referee:
(Switzerland) Marc Wiegand
Linesmen:
(Belarus) Andrei Haurylenka
(United Kingdom) James Kavanagh

	0–1	09:35 – J. Prpic (M. Lovrenčić, B. Rendulić) (PP2)
	0–2	15:31 – B. Rendulić (M. Lovrenčić, M. Tomljenović) (SH)
	0–3	22:02 – K. Macaulay (B. Rendulić)
	0–4	29:43 – J. Prpic (T. Mirić) (PP)
M. Sretović (N. Janković) – 32:02	1–4
N. Raković – 32:53	2–4
M. Sretović (R. Sabadoš, N. Janković) – 34:16	3–4
	3–5	36:26 – J. Hecimovic (M. Lovrenčić)
	3–6	52:48 – T. Mirić (A. Sertich) (PP)
D. Filipović – 56:05	4–6

8 min
Penalties
6 min
34
Shots
46

20 April 2013; 13:00	Australia	4–1 (2–0, 1–0, 1–1)	Spain	Dom Sportova, Zagreb; Attendance: 63

Game reference

Anthony Kimlin
Goalies
Luis Sokolov
Bruno González
Referee:
(Switzerland) Marc Wiegand
Linesmen:
(Croatia) Trpimir Piragić
(Croatia) Marko Saković

W. Darge (W. Cliff) – 02:16	1–0
W. Cliff (K. Darcy, D. Corstens) – 18:58	2–0
T. Graham (L. Webster) – 31:09	3–0
C. Todd (M. Schlamp, D. Corstens) – 45:14	4–0
	4–1	47:44 – P. Puyuelo (J. Muñoz, A. Ubieto) (PP2)

12 min
Penalties
8 min
39
Shots
31

20 April 2013; 16:30	Iceland	5–1 (1–0, 2–1, 2–0)	Serbia	Dom Sportova, Zagreb; Attendance: 143

Game reference

Dennis Hedstrom
Goalies
Arsenije Ranković
Milan Luković
Referee:
(Hungary) Gergely Kincses
Linesmen:
(Belarus) Andrei Haurylenka
(Romania) Mihai-Ariel Trandafir

B. Sigurðarson (P. Maack, E. Alengaard) – 14:23	1–0
	1–1	22:47 – M. Milovanović (N. Janković)
R. Hedstrom (O. Bjornsson, J. Gislason) – 28:27	2–1
A. Mikaelsson – 29:27	3–1
O. Bjornsson (R. Pålsson, R. Hedstrom) (PP) – 47:14	4–1
J. Gislason (J. Leifsson, R. Pålsson) – 58:31	5–1

14 min
Penalties
12 min
32
Shots
30

20 April 2013; 20:15	Croatia	6–0 (2–0, 0–0, 4–0)	Belgium	Dom Sportova, Zagreb; Attendance: 3,700

Game reference

Mate Tomljenović
Goalies
Bjorn Steijlen
Referee:
(Italy) Daniel Gamper
Linesmen:
(Austria) Florian Hofer
(United Kingdom) James Kavanagh

M. Blagus (D. Kanaet, B. Rendulić) – 01:20	1–0
M. Lovrenčić (J. Hecimovic, J. Prpic) – 02:14	2–0
J. Hecimovic (D. Kanaet, I. Šijan) – 44:41	3–0
M. Lovrenčić (J. Hecimovic, J. Prpic) – 45:51	4–0
B. Rendulić (M. Sakić) – 54:16	5–0
B. Rendulić (D. Kanaet, M. Blagus) (PP) – 57:30	6–0

12 min
Penalties
20 min
58
Shots
23

=== Statistics ===
==== Top 10 scorers ====
Pos	Player	Country	GP	G	A	Pts	+/−	PIM
1	John Hecimovic	Croatia	5	6	6	12	+5	0
2	Joel Prpic	Croatia	5	5	6	11	+6	8
3	Marko Lovrenčić	Croatia	5	3	8	11	+8	0
4	Vincent Morgan	Belgium	5	3	7	10	+6	0
5	Borna Rendulić	Croatia	5	5	3	8	+6	0
6	Emil Alengaard	Iceland	5	3	5	8	+1	4
6	Mitch Morgan	Belgium	5	3	5	8	+4	6
8	Marko Sretović	Serbia	5	4	3	7	+1	6
9	Darren Corstens	Australia	5	3	4	7	+5	4
10	Nemanja Janković	Serbia	5	1	6	7	−2	4

IIHF.com

==== Goaltending leaders ====
(minimum 40% team's total ice time)

Pos	Player	Country	TOI	GA	Sv%	GAA	SO
1	Bjorn Steijlen	Belgium	280:00	11	93.45	2.36	1
2	Mate Tomljenović	Croatia	300:00	8	93.28	1.60	1
3	Anthony Kimlin	Australia	305:00	13	92.53	2.56	0
4	Dennis Henstrom	Iceland	208:15	15	91.89	3.03	0
5	Milan Luković	Serbia	208:15	15	88.28	4.32	0

IIHF.com

=== Tournament awards ===
- Best players selected by the directorate:
  - Best Goaltender: (Belgium) Bjorn Steijlen
  - Best Defenceman: (Croatia) Andy Sertich
  - Best Forward: (Croatia) Joel Prpic

IIHF.com

== Division II B ==
2013 IIHF World Championship Division II B
Tournament details
- Host country: Turkey
- Venue: 1 (in 1 host city)
- Dates: 21 – 27 April 2013
- Teams: 6

Tournament statistics
- Games played: 15
- Goals scored: 138 (9.2 per game)
- Attendance: 2,520 (168 per game)

=== Participants ===
Team	Qualification
New Zealand	placed 6th in 2012 Division II A and were relegated
China	placed 2nd in 2012
Bulgaria	placed 3rd in 2012
Mexico	placed 4th in 2012
Israel	placed 5th in 2012
Turkey	hosts, placed 1st in 2012 Division III and were promoted

=== Officials ===
Referees

- (Belarus) Vladimir Nalivaiko
- (Belgium) Tim Tzirtziganis
- (Estonia) Igor Tsernyshov
- (Slovenia) Viki Trilar

Linesmen

- (Estonia) Mart Eerme
- (France) Mathieu Loos
- (Kazakhstan) Mergen Kaydarov
- (Serbia) Tibor Fazekas
- (Spain) Sergio Biec Cebrian
- (Turkey) Erhan Bulut
- (Turkey) Cemal Ersin Kaya

=== Final standings ===
Team	Pld	W	OTW	OTL	L	GF	GA	GD	Pts	Promotion or relegation
Israel	5	4	0	0	1	30	14	+16	12	Promoted to the 2014 Division II A
New Zealand	5	4	0	0	1	24	16	+8	12	
Mexico	5	3	1	0	1	25	18	+7	11	
China	5	2	0	0	3	20	25	−5	6	
Turkey	5	1	0	0	4	16	19	−3	3	
Bulgaria	5	0	0	1	4	23	46	−23	1	Relegated to the 2014 Division III

Source: IIHF

=== Results ===
All times are local (EEST – UTC+3).

21 April 2013; 13:00	Bulgaria	5–10 (1–3, 2–3, 2–4)	New Zealand	Kocaeli B.B. Ice Arena, İzmit; Attendance: 100

Game reference

Konstantin Mihaylov
Nikola Nikolov
Goalies
Richard Parry
Referee:
(Belgium) Tim Tzirtziganis
Linesmen:
(Spain) Sergio Biec Cebrian
(Turkey) Cemal Ersin Kaya

I. Hodulov – 00:53	1–0
	1–1	03:15 – J. Hay (C. Frear)
	1–2	06:27 – P. Heyd (J. Challis, J. Hay)
	1–3	13:00 – D. Nicholls (B. Speirs, B. Haines) (PP)
M. Boyadjiev (A. Yotov, S. Muhachev) – 20:44	2–3
	2–4	28:28 – N. Henderson (I. Wannamaker, D. Nicholls)
A. Yotov (S. Muhachev, M. Nikolov) (SH) – 30:24	3–4
	3–5	38:02 – B. Speirs (P. Heyd, R. Idoine) (PP)
	3–6	39:18 – B. Speirs (D. Nicholls)
	3–7	40:51 – D. Nicholls (J. Hay)
	3–8	46:21 – A. Cox (PP)
A. Yotov (PS) – 50:07	4–8
	4–9	52:06 – R. Idoine (D. Nicholls)
	4–10	53:31 – A. Cox (SH)
A. Yotov (C. Cvetanov, M. Boyadjiev) (PP) – 59:58	5–10

16 min
Penalties
10 min
26
Shots
54

21 April 2013; 16:30	China	3–6 (0–3, 2–2, 1–1)	Israel	Kocaeli B.B. Ice Arena, İzmit; Attendance: 120

Game reference

Liu Zhiwei
Goalies
Avihu Sorotzky
Referee:
(Estonia) Igor Tsernyshov
Linesmen:
(Turkey) Erhan Bulut
(Kazakhstan) Mergen Kaydarov

	0–1	05:00 – D. Erlich (S. Frenkel) (PP)
	0–2	08:01 – O. Eizenman (M. Birbraer, D. Erlich) (PP)
	0–3	18:13 – D. Erlich (S. Frenkel, R. Oz (PP)
	0–4	23:02 – M. Birbraer (D. Erlich) (PP)
	0–5	26:39 – O. Eizenman (S. Frenkel, D. Erlich) (PP)
Bao J. (Li X., Zhang H.) (PP) – 37:53	1–5
Chen L. – 38:17	2–5
	2–6	26:39 – D. Erlich (M. Birbraer) (ENG)
Zhang H. (Fu T.) – 59:01	3–6

34 min
Penalties
18 min
36
Shots
29

21 April 2013; 20:00	Turkey	4–6 (1–3, 0–1, 3–2)	Mexico	Kocaeli B.B. Ice Arena, İzmit; Attendance: 250

Game reference

Erol Kahraman
Goalies
Andres de la Garma
Alfonso de Alba
Referee:
(Slovenia) Viki Trilar
Linesmen:
(Serbia) Tibor Fazekas
(France) Mathieu Loos

	0–1	05:08 – F. Ugarte (A. Gutiérrez, B. Arroyo) (PP)
	0–2	06:59 – C. Kelo (R. Chabat, A. Gutiérrez)
	0–3	09:33 – C. Kelo (PP)
S. Gümüş (B. Kosemen) – 18:26	1–3
	1–4	37:40 – B. Arroyo (A. Gutiérrez, F. Ugarte) (PP)
	1–5	45:21 – B. Arroyo (F. Ugarte, A. Cervantes)
G. Solak – 46:13	2–5
	2–6	51:32 – J. Ramírez (B. Arroyo)
B. Kosemen (S. Gümüş) – 58:23	3–6
E. Özmen (S. Aktürk, Y. Halil) (PP) – 58:59	4–6

18 min
Penalties
16 min
16
Shots
35

22 April 2013; 13:00	New Zealand	4–2 (2–1, 1–0, 1–1)	Mexico	Kocaeli B.B. Ice Arena, İzmit; Attendance: 90

Game reference

Richard Parry
Goalies
Andres de la Garma
Referee:
(Belarus) Vladimir Nalivaiko
Linesmen:
(Turkey) Erhan Bulut
(Serbia) Tibor Fazekas

B. Haines (PP) – 05:10	1–0
J. Chai (K. Harnett, N. Henderson) – 07:18	2–0
	2–1	19:59 – M. Colas (C. Gómez)
B. Haines (C. Huber, A. Cox) (PP) – 30:55	3–1
	3–2	44:23 – Al. Cervantes (LA. de la Vega, Ad. Cervantes)
B. Speirs (B. Haines) – 56:27	4–2

35 min
Penalties
18 min
37
Shots
26

22 April 2013; 16:30	China	9–6 (3–1, 4–1, 2–4)	Bulgaria	Kocaeli B.B. Ice Arena, İzmit; Attendance: 70

Game reference

Liu Zhiwei
Goalies
Nikola Nikolov
Referee:
(Slovenia) Viki Trilar
Linesmen:
(Estonia) Mart Eerme
(Turkey) Cemal Ersin Kaya

Wang C. (Fu N.) – 06:41	1–0
Guan T. (Fu T.) (PP2) – 13:17	2–0
He Y. – 15:45	3–0
	3–1	17:15 – A. Yotov (I. Hodulov)
Fu T. – 21:03	4–1
	4–2	22:31 – A. Yotov (S. Muhachev) (PP)
Bao J. (Li X.) – 23:01	5–2
Fu N. (Wang C., Yang M.) – 27:07	6–2
Yang M. (Chen L., Liu L.) (PP) – 39:21	7–2
	7–3	40:39 – G. Iskrenov (S. Muhachev, A. Yotov) (PP)
	7–4	42:47 – N. Bozhanov (A. Yotov) (PP)
Zhang H. (Li X.) – 47:14	8–4
	8–5	53:10 – I. Hodulov (C. Cvetanov) (PP)
	8–6	55:56 – A. Yotov (S. Muhachev) (PP)
Wang C. (Fu N.) – 58:44	9–6

43 min
Penalties
24 min
37
Shots
27

22 April 2013; 20:00	Israel	5–3 (0–1, 2–2, 3–0)	Turkey	Kocaeli B.B. Ice Arena, İzmit; Attendance: 320

Game reference

Avihu Sorotzky
Goalies
Erol Kahraman
Referee:
(Estonia) Igor Tsernyshov
Linesmen:
(Spain) Sergio Biec Cebrian
(France) Mathieu Loos

	0–1	18:27 – G. Çetinkaya (G. Solak)
M. Birbraer (O. Eizenman, D. Erlich) – 20:37	1–1
O. Eizenman (R. Oz, S. Frenkel) (PP) – 22:57	2–1
	2–2	24:25 – Y. Halil
	2–3	27:36 – E. Özmen (S. Semiz) (PP2)
D. Mazour (O. Eizenman, M. Birbraer) (PP) – 42:47	3–3
D. Erlich (D. Mazour) – 45:52	4–3
D. Mazour (N. Kantor, R. Oz) – 56:02	5–3

18 min
Penalties
34 min
33
Shots
26

24 April 2013; 13:00	New Zealand	2–3 (0–2, 1–1, 1–0)	Israel	Kocaeli B.B. Ice Arena, İzmit; Attendance: 90

Game reference

Richard Parry
Goalies
Avihu Sorotzky
Referee:
(Slovenia) Viki Trilar
Linesmen:
(Turkey) Cemal Ersin Kaya
(France) Mathieu Loos

	0–1	07:05 – D. Mazour (O. Eizenman) (PP)
	0–2	18:27 – S. Frenkel (O. Eizenman, M. Birbraer) (PP)
I. Wannamaker (J. Hay, R. Idoine) (PP) – 24:57	1–2
	1–3	37:07 – M. Birbraer (D. Erlich, O. Eizenman) (PP)
J. Chai – 50:27	2–3

8 min
Penalties
6 min
25
Shots
28

24 April 2013; 16:30	Bulgaria	7–8 OT (2–3, 2–2, 3–2) (OT 0–1)	Mexico	Kocaeli B.B. Ice Arena, İzmit; Attendance: 100

Game reference

Nikola Nikolov
Goalies
Andres de la Garma
Referee:
(Belgium) Tim Tzirtziganis
Linesmen:
(Estonia) Mart Eerme
(Serbia) Tibor Fazekas

S. Muhachev (A. Yotov) – 03:46	1–0
	1–1	05:22 – Ad. Cervantes (Al. Cervantes)
M. Milanov (M. Boyadjiev, I. Hodulov) – 07:34	2–1
	2–2	09:40 – A. Gutiérrez (C. Gómez) (SH)
	2–3	16:20 – F. Padilla (Ad. Cervantes, Al. Cervantes)
	2–4	22:24 – B. Arroyo (J. Ramírez, M. Sierra)
C. Cvetanov (M. Giurov, A. Yotov) (PP) – 24:41	3–4
C. Cvetanov (S. Muhachev, G. Iskrenov) (PP) – 28:32	4–4
	4–5	35:48 – A. Gutiérrez (F. Ugarte, Al. Cervantes) (PP)
	4–6	43:55 – B. Arroyo (A. Gutiérrez, F. Ugarte) (PP2)
S. Muhachev (SH) – 50:14	5–6
S. Muhachev (M. Giurov, A. Yotov) (PP) – 54:40	6–6
	6–7	56:13 – B. Arroyo (M. Colas)
A. Yotov (S. Muhachev) (SH) – 59:41	7–7
	7–8	62:01 – C. Gómez (F. Ugarte, LA. de la Vega)

48 min
Penalties
10 min
30
Shots
55

24 April 2013; 20:00	China	3–2 (1–0, 1–0, 1–2)	Turkey	Kocaeli B.B. Ice Arena, İzmit; Attendance: 238

Game reference

Liu Zhiwei
Goalies
Erol Kahraman
Referee:
(Belarus) Vladimir Nalivaiko
Linesmen:
(Spain) Sergio Biec Cebrian
(Kazakhstan) Mergen Kaydarov

Zhang H. (Bao J.) – 01:37	1–0
Li X. (PS) – 33:42	2–0
	2–1	40:32 – S. Aktürk (S. Semiz) (PP)
	2–2	43:06 – E. Özmen
Bao J. – 51:17	3–2

14 min
Penalties
8 min
34
Shots
27

25 April 2013; 13:00	Israel	13–2 (5–1, 3–1, 5–0)	Bulgaria	Kocaeli B.B. Ice Arena, İzmit; Attendance: 72

Game reference

Nikola Nikolov
Konstantin Mihaylov
Goalies
Avihu Sorotzky
Referee:
(Estonia) Igor Tsernyshov
Linesmen:
(Turkey) Erhan Bulut
(Kazakhstan) Mergen Kaydarov

M. Birbraer (O. Eizenman, D. Erlich) – 00:18	1–0
M. Birbraer (D. Erlich, O. Eizenman) (PP2) – 12:17	2–0
O. Eizenman (M. Birbraer, D. Erlich) – 13:39	3–0
D. Erlich (O. Eizenman) (SH) – 15:44	4–0
	4–1	17:18 – S. Muhachev (A. Yotov, M. Giurov) (PP)
S. Frenkel (D. Erlich, D. Mazour) (PP) – 19:42	5–1
	5–2	22:01 – M. Nikolov (M. Boyadjiev) (SH)
D. Mazour (D. Erlich, O. Eizenman) (PP) – 34:55	6–2
D. Mazour (D. Erlich, O. Eizenman) (PP) – 35:43	7–2
D. Erlich (D. Mazour, S. Frenkel) (PP) – 38:26	8–2
O. Eizenman (D. Erlich, M. Birbraer) (PP) – 44:03	9–2
D. Erlich – 49:12	10–2
D. Mazour (S. Frenkel, I. Levy) – 49:30	11–2
O. Eizenman (D. Erlich, S. Frenkel) (PP2) – 51:30	12–2
D. Mazour (S. Frenkel, I. Levy) – 53:36	13–2

18 min
Penalties
28 min
52
Shots
26

25 April 2013; 16:30	Mexico	5–0 (2–0, 2–0, 1–0)	China	Kocaeli B.B. Ice Arena, İzmit; Attendance: 90

Game reference

Alfonso de Alba
Andres de la Garma
Goalies
Liu Zhiwei
Xia Shengrong
Referee:
(Belarus) Vladimir Nalivaiko
Linesmen:
(Spain) Sergio Biec Cebrian
(Turkey) Cemal Ersin Kaya

M. Sierra (Ad. Cervantes) – 09:13	1–0
Ad. Cervantes (C. Gómez, C. Kelo) (PP2) – 15:30	2–0
B. Arroyo (PP) – 34:15	3–0
M. Colas (PP) – 35:28	4–0
B. Arroyo (PP) – 54:54	5–0

16 min
Penalties
97 min
40
Shots
21

25 April 2013; 20:00	Turkey	1–2 (0–0, 1–2, 0–0)	New Zealand	Kocaeli B.B. Ice Arena, İzmit; Attendance: 300

Game reference

Erol Kahraman
Goalies
Richard Parry
Referee:
(Belgium) Tim Tzirtziganis
Linesmen:
(Estonia) Mart Eerme
(France) Mathieu Loos

	0–1	21:01 – C. Huber (D. Nicholls, B. Haines) (PP)
	0–2	24:15 – I. Wannamaker (J. Lawrence)
Y. Halil (B. Kosemen, G. Solak) – 29:47	1–2

16 min
Penalties
14 min
27
Shots
48

27 April 2013; 13:00	Mexico	4–3 (0–0, 1–2, 3–1)	Israel	Kocaeli B.B. Ice Arena, İzmit; Attendance: 80

Game reference

Alfonso de Alba
Goalies
Avihu Sorotzky
Referee:
(Belarus) Vladimir Nalivaiko
Linesmen:
(Turkey) Erhan Bulut
(France) Mathieu Loos

	0–1	23:23 – O. Eizenman (D. Erlich) (SH)
A. Gutiérrez (R. Chabat, B. Arroyo) (PP) – 28:45	1–1
	1–2	32:05 – O. Eizenman (M. Birbraer, D. Erlich) (PP)
B. Arroyo (PP) – 41:24	2–2
	2–3	49:16 – D. Mazour (D. Erlich, M. Birbraer) (PP)
B. Arroyo (L. de la Vega) (PP) – 53:43	3–3
C. Kelo (S. Sierra, M. Colas) – 54:12	4–3

16 min
Penalties
36 min
31
Shots
19

27 April 2013; 16:30	Bulgaria	3–6 (3–1, 0–2, 0–3)	Turkey	Kocaeli B.B. Ice Arena, İzmit; Attendance: 350

Game reference

Nikola Nikolov
Goalies
Erol Kahraman
Referee:
(Slovenia) Viki Trilar
Linesmen:
(Serbia) Tibor Fazekas
(Kazakhstan) Mergen Kaydarov

G. Iskrenov (M. Giurov) – 02:44	1–0
G. Iskrenov (A. Yotov) – 09:58	2–0
	2–1	13:58 – Y. Halil (G. Hamarat) (SH)
G. Iskrenov (S. Muhachev, C. Cvetanov) (PP) – 14:34	3–1
	3–2	31:41 – E. Coşkun (G. Hamarat, S. Gümüş)
	3–3	37:58 – S. Gümüş (PP)
	3–4	49:31 – Y. Halil (SH)
	3–5	50:13 – S. Gümüş (G. Çetinkaya, G. Solak)
	3–6	52:04 – E. Coşkun (B. Koseman, S. Gümüş)

14 min
Penalties
22 min
33
Shots
43

27 April 2013; 20:00	New Zealand	6–5 (2–1, 0–3, 4–1)	China	Kocaeli B.B. Ice Arena, İzmit; Attendance: 250

Game reference

Richard Parry
Goalies
Liu Zhiwei
Xia Shengrong
Referee:
(Estonia) Igor Tsernyshov
Linesmen:
(Spain) Sergio Biec Cebrian
(Estonia) Mart Eerme

I. Wannamaker (N. Henderson, J. Lawrence) – 01:21	1–0
J. Hay (P. Heyd) – 08:08	2–0
	2–1	18:07 – Hu T. (Fu N., Yang M.) (PP)
	2–2	20:38 – Hu T. (Yang M.) (PP2)
	2–3	28:55 – Hu T. (Yang M.)
	2–4	35:03 – Bao J. (Hu T.)
A. Cox (C. Huber) – 40:36	3–4
J. Hay (P. Heyd) – 42:24	4–4
	4–5	47:28 – W. Chongwei (Fu N.) (PP)
A. Cox (P. Heyd) – 49:50	5–5
R. Idoine (I. Wannamaker P. Heyd) – 59:36	6–5

32 min
Penalties
14 min
42
Shots
30

=== Statistics ===
==== Top 10 scorers ====
Pos	Player	Country	GP	G	A	Pts	+/−	PIM
1	Daniel Erlich	Israel	5	7	16	23	+4	14
2	Oren Eizenman	Israel	5	8	10	18	+2	4
3	Alexei Yotov	Bulgaria	5	7	8	15	–8	8
4	Max Birbraer	Israel	5	5	8	13	+3	6
5	Brian Arroyo	Mexico	5	9	3	12	0	0
6	Stanislav Muhachev	Bulgaria	5	4	8	12	–7	2
7	Daniel Mazour	Israel	5	8	3	11	+2	14
8	Sergei Frenkel	Israel	5	2	8	10	0	4
9	Alexander Gutiérrez	Mexico	5	3	4	7	–1	4
10	Serkan Gümüş	Turkey	5	3	3	6	–1	12
10	Joshua Hay	New Zealand	5	3	3	6	+2	4

IIHF.com

==== Goaltending leaders ====
(minimum 40% team's total ice time)

Pos	Player	Country	MINS	GA	Sv%	GAA	SO
1	Avihu Sorotzky	Israel	299:14	14	90.28	2.81	0
2	Erol Kahraman	Turkey	299:45	19	89.62	3.80	0
3	Richard Parry	New Zealand	298.52	16	88.32	3.21	0
4	Alfonso de Alba	Mexico	148.33	6	87.23	2.42	0
5	Liu Zhiwei	China	235.06	19	85.27	4.85	0

IIHF.com

=== Tournament awards ===
- Best players selected by the directorate:
  - Best Goaltender: (Israel) Avihu Sorotzky
  - Best Defenceman: (New Zealand) Berton Haines
  - Best Forward: (Mexico) Brian Arroyo

IIHF.com
