= Marcell Ranger Station =

- U.S. National Register of Historic Places
- U.S. Historic district
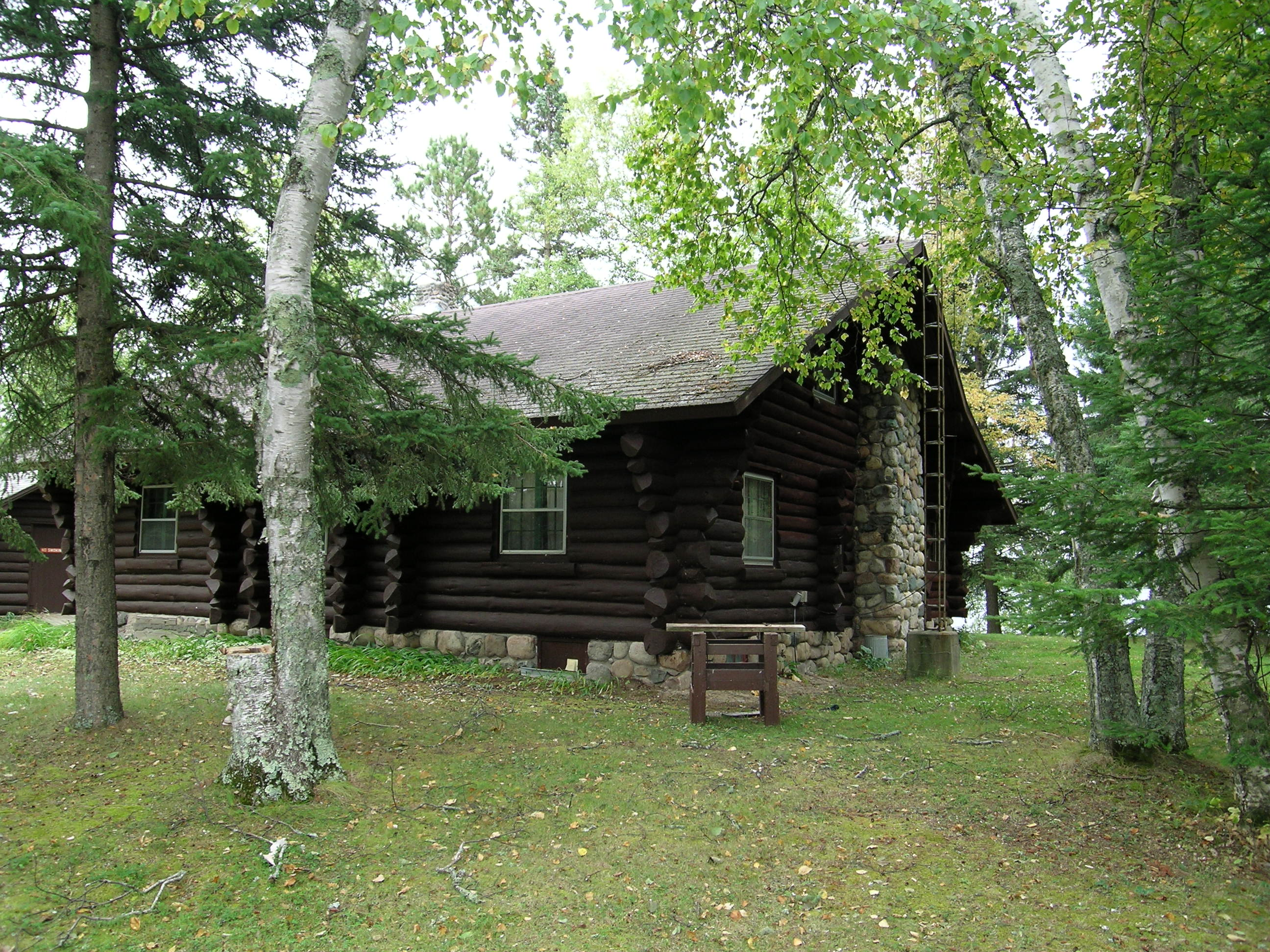
- Rustic-style log building surrounded by trees at Marcell Ranger Station

- Location within Minnesota Location within the United States
- Location: 49554 Minnesota State Highway 38, Marcell Township, Minnesota
- Coordinates: 47°35′46″N 93°41′14″W
- Area: 13 acres (5.3 ha)
- Built: 1934–5
- Architect: United States Forest Service, Civilian Conservation Corps
- Architectural style: National Park Service rustic
- NRHP reference No.: 94000473
- Designated HD: May 19, 1994

The Marcell Ranger Station is a historic United States Forest Service ranger station in Marcell Township, Minnesota. It was built from 1934 to 1935 to serve as the headquarters for the Marcell District of Chippewa National Forest. It was listed as a historic district on the National Register of Historic Places in 1994 for having state-level significance in the themes of architecture, conservation, and politics/government. It was nominated for its associations with the expansion and development of Chippewa National Forest during the New Deal, for being a well-preserved example of that era's Forest Service administrative facilities, and for its fine National Park Service rustic architecture. Marcell Ranger Station was closed in 2001 and the property was converted into a vacation rental known as Marcell Lodge. A 1963 office adjacent to Minnesota State Highway 38 was turned into the Edge of the Wilderness Discovery Center, a visitor center for the Edge of the Wilderness Scenic Byway.

== History ==
In 1902 the Morris Act created the Minnesota Forest Reserve from Ojibwe lands. The timber was to be cut and sold for the benefit of the Ojibwe. A percentage was kept standing and parts of the reserve were protected. Six years later president Theodore Roosevelt made the forest a national reserve. It was later renamed the Chippewa National Forest Reserve. The reserve was meant to protect, conserve, and use the natural resources of the forest. In 1933 it was expanded northward. This created a need for ranger districts. One of them was named the Marcell District.

In 1934 the construction of a ranger station to administer the Marcell District began. The station was constructed by the Civilian Conservation Corps (CCC). The station encompassed 13 acres (5.3 ha) on the northern shore of Lake Rainier and included several buildings. By the spring of 1935 there were three CCC camps operating in the Marcell District. At times the camps were at full capacity, with a total of 200 men per camp. Many projects were completed at the camps. They included land and timber surveys, stand and roadside improvements, and land acquisitions. Workers also planted trees annually and restocked fish populations. Erosion and fire hazards were monitored as well.

The rustic architecture of the Marcell Ranger Station is representative of the design practiced by the National Park Service and the U.S. Forest Service during the Great Depression era. It sought to achieve harmony with nature, to use materials native to the landscape, and to build the minimal number of structures needed. It was a little-noticed movement in American architecture and unique for government buildings. In 1935 the Park Service published a textbook to train new architects in its building practices.

Most of the major buildings that comprise the Marcell Ranger Station were based on a standard plan. Each of them features finely crafted, rustic-style elements. These elements include split stone fireplaces, interior log partition walls, and hand-wrought hardware. Together, the buildings at the Marcell Ranger Station remain fine examples of the high-quality log construction for which northern Minnesota was recognized.

For the second half of the 20th century the Marcell Ranger Station served its original purpose. In 2001 it was closed as part of the merging of the National Forest's administrative offices. In 2006 and 2007 the Chippewa National Forest was granted $20,000 to convert the station into an interpretive center. The station became a rest stop for travelers and a center for educating the public about the environment. It was renamed the Edge of the Wilderness Discovery Center.

== See also ==
- National Register of Historic Places listings in Itasca County, Minnesota
