= Mike Antonovich =

Mike Antonovich may refer to:

- Mike Antonovich (ice hockey) (born 1951), former hockey player and coach
- Michael D. Antonovich (born 1939), former member of the Los Angeles County Board of Supervisors
