= Ken Gernander =

American ice hockey player and coach

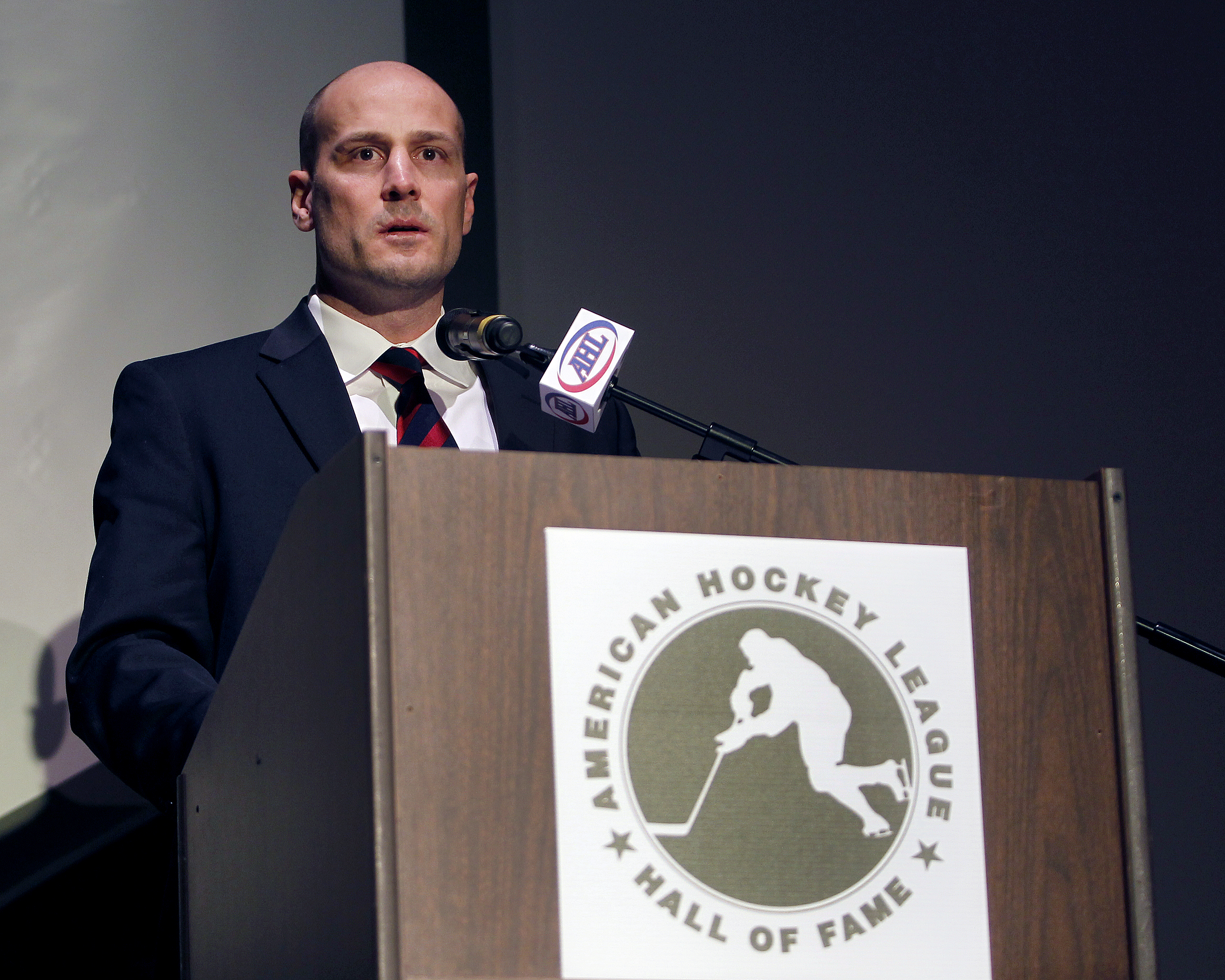
- Gernander in 2013
- Born: June 30, 1969 (age 57) Coleraine, Minnesota, U.S.
- Height: 5 ft 10 in (178 cm)
- Weight: 175 lb (79 kg; 12 st 7 lb)
- Position: Right wing
- Shot: Left
- Played for: New York Rangers
- National team: United States
- NHL draft: 96th overall, 1987; Winnipeg Jets
- Playing career: 1991–2005

Kenneth Robert Gernander (born June 30, 1969) is an American ice hockey coach and former professional right winger. Gernander played 12 regular season games in the National Hockey League (NHL) with the New York Rangers between 1996 and 2004. Born in Coleraine, Minnesota, he played for the University of Minnesota for four years and was drafted by the Winnipeg Jets in the fifth round of the 1987 NHL entry draft. He is currently the head men’s ice hockey coach at Franklin Pierce University.

== Early life ==
Gernander was born on June 30, 1969, in Coleraine, Minnesota, to parents Bob and Bonnie Gernander. His father was a National Hockey League (NHL) scout for the Dallas Stars. His younger brothers Jerry and Jim also played professional ice hockey.

== Playing career ==
=== Amateur ===
During his senior year at Greenway High School, Gernander was named a finalist for the Minnesota Mr. Hockey Award as the most outstanding senior high school hockey player in the state of Minnesota. He was also named to the 1987 Associated Press' First All-State hockey team. Due to his athletic ability and high grade point average, Gernander received a scholarship to play collegiate hockey at the University of Minnesota for the Minnesota Golden Gophers. Before enrolling at the University of Minnesota, Gernander was drafted in the fifth round, 96th overall, by the Winnipeg Jets in the 1987 NHL entry draft.

=== Collegiate career ===
Gernander spent four seasons with the Minnesota Golden Gophers from 1987 to 1991. He was one of seven freshmen who began the 1987–88 season with the Gophers and was predicted to win the Western Collegiate Hockey Association's (WCHA) Rookie of the Year. Gernander helped the Gophers begin the season with a 5–0 winning record. Upon losing to the Maine Black Bears in the 1988 NCAA playoffs, Gernander finished his freshman season with 14 goals and 14 assists for 28 points through 44 games. He was subsequently selected as a candidate for the 1989 United States men's national junior ice hockey team.

Gernander experienced a dip in scoring in his sophomore season after Dave Snuggerud and Tom Chorske returned to the Gophers, but quickly picked up again in his junior year. After switching from centreman to a winger position, Gernander quickly surpassed his previous season's career-highs. At the end of October 1989, Gernander scored four goals in one game against the University of North Dakota Fighting Sioux. He missed a week of game-play due to an illness. He scored two goals in his return to the Gophers lineup on January 13, 1990.

=== Professional ===
Gernander concluded his collegiate career in May 1991 by signing a professional contract with the Winnipeg Jets.

Gernander scored his first career NHL goal in his NHL debut on March 9, 1996, against the Washington Capitals.

When Gernander retired after the 2004–05 season, he held numerous AHL records. He ranked as the league's all-time leader in career playoff games played (123) and was the highest-scoring American-born player in AHL history, recording 624 points over 973 games.

=== Legacy ===
Following his retirement, Gernander's number 12 became the only number retired by the Wolf Pack, and he was inducted into the Binghamton Hockey Hall of Fame. Gernander was also inducted into the AHL Hall of Fame in 2013.

== Coaching career ==
After his retirement, Gernander spent two seasons as Hartford's assistant coach. He was promoted to head coach of the Wolf Pack on July 23, 2007, as a replacement for Jim Schoenfeld. During his tenure with the team, Gernander helped lead the Wolf Pack to a division title and became the 18th head coach in AHL history to earn 300 career wins. Gernander replaced John Tortorella as head coach of the Rangers for one game after the latter earned a one-game suspension. The Rangers lost 5-3 and the Capitals tied their playoff series 3–3. He spent 10 years as head coach before being released on May 16, 2017. While the Rangers offered to hire him as a scout, Gernander instead chose to re-enroll at the University of Minnesota and finish his degree.

Gernander briefly served as a scout for the New York Islanders before accepting an appointment as head coach of Franklin Pierce University's men’s ice hockey team in May 2024. The Ravens went 2-25-2 in his only year as head coach.

== Personal life ==
Gernander and his wife have three children together, Miranda, Micah and McKenna. Micah played collegiate hockey at Gustavus Adolphus College while McKenna played ice hockey at Nichols College.

== Career statistics ==
=== Regular season and playoffs ===
			Regular season					Playoffs
Season	Team	League	GP	G	A	Pts	PIM	GP	G	A	Pts	PIM
1985–86	Greenway High School	HS-MN	23	14	23	37	—	—	—	—	—	—
1986–87	Greenway High School	HS-MN	26	35	34	69	—	—	—	—	—	—
1986–87	Des Moines Buccaneers	USHL	—	—	—	—	—	—	—	—	—	—
1987–88	University of Minnesota	WCHA	44	14	14	28	14	—	—	—	—	—
1988–89	University of Minnesota	WCHA	44	9	11	20	2	—	—	—	—	—
1989–90	University of Minnesota	WCHA	44	32	17	49	24	—	—	—	—	—
1990–91	University of Minnesota	WCHA	44	23	20	43	24	—	—	—	—	—
1991–92	Fort Wayne Komets	IHL	13	7	6	13	2	—	—	—	—	—
1991–92	Moncton Hawks	AHL	43	8	18	26	9	8	1	1	2	2
1992–93	Moncton Hawks	AHL	71	18	29	47	20	5	1	4	5	0
1993–94	Moncton Hawks	AHL	71	22	25	47	12	19	6	1	7	0
1994–95	Binghamton Rangers	AHL	80	28	25	53	24	11	2	2	4	6
1995–96	New York Rangers	NHL	10	2	3	5	4	6	0	0	0	0
1995–96	Binghamton Rangers	AHL	63	44	29	73	38	—	—	—	—	—
1996–97	Binghamton Rangers	AHL	46	13	18	31	30	2	0	1	1	0
1996–97	New York Rangers	NHL	—	—	—	—	—	9	0	0	0	0
1997–98	Hartford Wolf Pack	AHL	80	35	28	63	26	12	5	6	11	4
1998–99	Hartford Wolf Pack	AHL	70	23	26	49	32	7	1	2	3	2
1999–00	Hartford Wolf Pack	AHL	79	28	29	57	24	23	5	5	10	0
2000–01	Hartford Wolf Pack	AHL	80	22	27	49	39	2	0	0	0	0
2001–02	Hartford Wolf Pack	AHL	75	18	31	49	19	10	1	3	4	4
2002–03	Hartford Wolf Pack	AHL	72	17	19	36	22	2	0	0	0	0
2003–04	New York Rangers	NHL	2	0	0	0	2	—	—	—	—	—
2003–04	Hartford Wolf Pack	AHL	77	12	19	31	28	16	3	4	7	2
2004–05	Hartford Wolf Pack	AHL	66	5	8	13	18	6	1	0	1	0
AHL totals			973	293	331	624	341	123	26	29	55	20
NHL totals			12	2	3	5	6	15	0	0	0	0

=== Coaching record ===
Team	Year	League	Regular season							Postseason
Team	Year	League	G	W	L	T	OTL	Pts	Finish	Result
Hartford Wolf Pack	2007–08	AHL	80	50	20	—	10	110	2nd in Atlantic	Lost in First Round
Hartford Wolf Pack	2008–09	AHL	80	46	27	—	7	99	1st in Atlantic	Lost in First round
Hartford Wolf Pack	2009–10	AHL	80	36	33	—	11	83	6th in Atlantic	Did not qualify
Connecticut Whale	2010–11	AHL	80	40	32	—	8	88	3rd in Atlantic	Lost in First Round
Connecticut Whale	2011–12	AHL	76	36	26	—	14	86	2nd in Northeast	Lost in Second Round
Connecticut Whale	2012–13	AHL	76	35	32	—	9	79	2nd in Northeast	Did not qualify
Hartford Wolf Pack	2013–14	AHL	76	37	32	—	7	81	3rd in Northeast	Did not qualify
Hartford Wolf Pack	2014–15	AHL	76	43	24	—	9	95	1st in Northeast	Lost in Third Round
Hartford Wolf Pack	2015–16	AHL	76	41	32	—	3	85	6th in Atlantic	Did not qualify
Hartford Wolf Pack	2016–17	AHL	76	24	46	—	6	54	7th in Atlantic	Did not qualify
AHL totals			776	388	304	—	84	860		

== Awards and honors ==
Award	Year	Ref
WCHA All-Tournament Team	1990	
Fred T. Hunt Memorial Award	1996, 2004	
Calder Cup	2000	
