= John Hecimovic =

Canadian-born Croatian ice hockey player

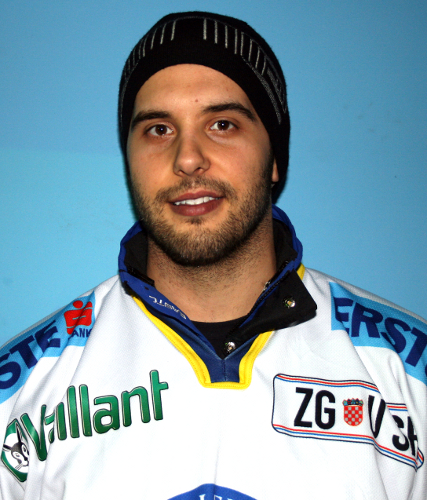
- Born: March 31, 1984 (age 42) Cambridge, Ontario, Canada
- Height: 6 ft 2 in (188 cm)
- Weight: 214 lb (97 kg; 15 st 4 lb)
- Position: Right wing
- Shot: Right
- Played for: South Carolina Stingrays; Straubing Tigers; Pensacola Ice Pilots; HYS The Hague; KHL Medveščak; Dornbirner EC
- National team: Croatia
- NHL draft: 264th overall, 2003; Florida Panthers
- Playing career: 2005–2013

John Hećimović (born March 31, 1984) is a Canadian-born Croatian former professional ice hockey player. He most notably played in the Erste Bank Eishockey Liga with KHL Medveščak and Dornbirner EC. Hećimović's ancestors hail from Perušić in Lika.

== Playing career ==
Hećimović was selected in the 9th round (264th overall) of the 2003 NHL entry draft by the Florida Panthers. John was drafted from Major Junior Sarnia Sting of the Ontario Hockey League. In his fifth season with the Sting (2004–05) he was traded to the Mississauga IceDogs to finish his junior career.

In his career Hećimović has played in the 2nd Austrian, German, and Swiss league. In the 2008–09 season he was the leading scorer of the Dutch Championship, helping HYS The Hague win the title. On June 3, 2009, Hećimović signed as a free agent with Croatian team, KHL Medveščak, joining the prestigious EBEL league. In the 2009–10 season, his first with the Bears, John scored 20 goals in 49 regular season games. At the 2010 Šalata Winter Classic, Hećimović became the first and top scorer with two goals, within EBEL history to score at Šalata in the defeat against Villach 2–3. On April 20, 2010, he was re-signed to a two-year contract as Medveščak finished seventh in the league.

Hećimović moved onto a tryout at HDD Olimpija Ljubljana. In October 2011 he signed a one-month deal with Anyang Halla.

On December 8, 2011, Hećimović was signed by the Nippon Paper Cranes of the Asia League for the remainder of the 2011–12 season. After finishing the season with the Nippon Paper Cranes, Hećimović returned to the EBEL for one final season with Dornbirner EC.

In 2013, Hećimović played for the Croatian national team at the IIHF World Championship Division II.

== Career statistics ==
=== Regular season and playoffs ===
			Regular season					Playoffs
Season	Team	League	GP	G	A	Pts	PIM	GP	G	A	Pts	PIM
2000–01	Sarnia Sting	OHL	62	6	11	17	27	4	0	0	0	5
2001–02	Sarnia Sting	OHL	65	30	19	49	64	5	1	3	4	2
2002–03	Sarnia Sting	OHL	60	30	32	62	112	6	4	2	6	6
2003–04	Sarnia Sting	OHL	60	30	32	62	98	5	2	3	5	6
2004–05	Sarnia Sting	OHL	12	7	4	11	18	—	—	—	—	—
2004–05	Mississauga IceDogs	OHL	39	19	14	33	99	5	2	2	4	2
2005–06	South Carolina Stingrays	ECHL	24	5	10	15	40	—	—	—	—	—
2005–06	Straubing Tigers	GER.2	11	4	3	7	37	3	1	0	1	29
2006–07	Pensacola Ice Pilots	ECHL	44	23	32	55	66	—	—	—	—	—
2007–08	Pensacola Ice Pilots	ECHL	5	0	2	2	0	—	—	—	—	—
2007–08	HYS The Hague	NED	25	23	23	46	21	3	2	1	3	41
2008–09	HYS The Hague	NED	16	14	7	21	26	10	5	11	16	10
2009–10	KHL Medveščak	AUT	49	20	19	39	38	11	3	7	10	4
2009–10	KHL Medveščak Zagreb II	CRO	—	—	—	—	—	1	0	1	1	0
2010–11	KHL Medveščak	AUT	47	22	26	48	50	5	2	2	4	2
2010–11	KHL Medveščak Zagreb II	CRO	—	—	—	—	—	1	3	1	4	0
2011–12	Anyang Halla	ALH	10	5	1	6	4	—	—	—	—	—
2011–12	Nippon Paper Cranes	ALH	14	5	8	13	10	3	0	0	0	0
2012–13	Dornbirner EC	AUT	23	4	8	12	14	—	—	—	—	—
ECHL totals			73	28	44	72	106	—	—	—	—	—
AUT totals			119	46	53	99	102	16	5	9	14	6

=== International ===
Year	Team	Event	GP	G	A	Pts	PIM
2012	Croatia	OGQ	2	1	4	5	0
2013	Croatia	WC D2A	5	6	6	12	0
Senior totals			7	7	10	17	0
