= Iron Range Township, Itasca County, Minnesota =

Iron Range Township, Minnesota
- Township
- Location within the state of Minnesota Iron Range Township, Minnesota (the United States)
- Coordinates: 47°19′11″N 93°22′12″W
- Country: United States
- State: Minnesota
- County: Itasca

Area
  - Total: 28.9 sq mi (74.9 km^{2})
  - Land: 27.2 sq mi (70.4 km^{2})
  - Water: 1.7 sq mi (4.5 km^{2})
- Elevation: 1,427 ft (435 m)

Population (2010)
  - Total: 649
  - Density: 23.9/sq mi (9.22/km^{2})
- Time zone: UTC-6 (Central (CST))
  - Summer (DST): UTC-5 (CDT)
- FIPS code: 27-31256
- GNIS feature ID: 0664556

Iron Range Township was a township in Itasca County, Minnesota, United States. The population was 649 at the 2010 census.

The township was annexed by the city of Taconite effective January 1, 2013.

Iron Range Township was named for the local iron mining industry.

== Geography ==
According to the United States Census Bureau, the township has a total area of 28.9 square miles (75 km^{2}), of which 27.2 square miles (70 km^{2}) is land and 1.8 square miles (4.7 km^{2}), or 6.05%, is water.

== Demographics ==
As of the census of 2000, there were 651 people, 258 households, and 175 families residing in the township. The population density was 24.0 inhabitants per square mile (9.3/km^{2}). There were 314 housing units at an average density of 11.6 per square mile (4.5/km^{2}). The racial makeup of the township was 97.24% White, 0.15% Native American, 0.31% Asian, 0.31% Pacific Islander, 0.15% from other races, and 1.84% from two or more races. Hispanic or Latino of any race were 0.15% of the population.

There were 258 households, out of which 32.6% had children under the age of 18 living with them, 55.0% were married couples living together, 7.8% had a female householder with no husband present, and 31.8% were non-families. 26.7% of all households were made up of individuals, and 14.0% had someone living alone who was 65 years of age or older. The average household size was 2.52 and the average family size was 2.99.

In the township the population was spread out, with 26.4% under the age of 18, 8.1% from 18 to 24, 30.1% from 25 to 44, 20.0% from 45 to 64, and 15.4% who were 65 years of age or older. The median age was 37 years. For every 100 females, there were 93.2 males. For every 100 females age 18 and over, there were 93.9 males.

The median income for a household in the township was $35,000, and the median income for a family was $46,750. Males had a median income of $37,344 versus $20,417 for females. The per capita income for the township was $16,384. About 9.7% of families and 15.0% of the population were below the poverty line, including 22.5% of those under age 18 and 5.4% of those age 65 or over.
