= Coleraine Methodist Episcopal Church =

Historic church in Minnesota, United States

- U.S. National Register of Historic Places
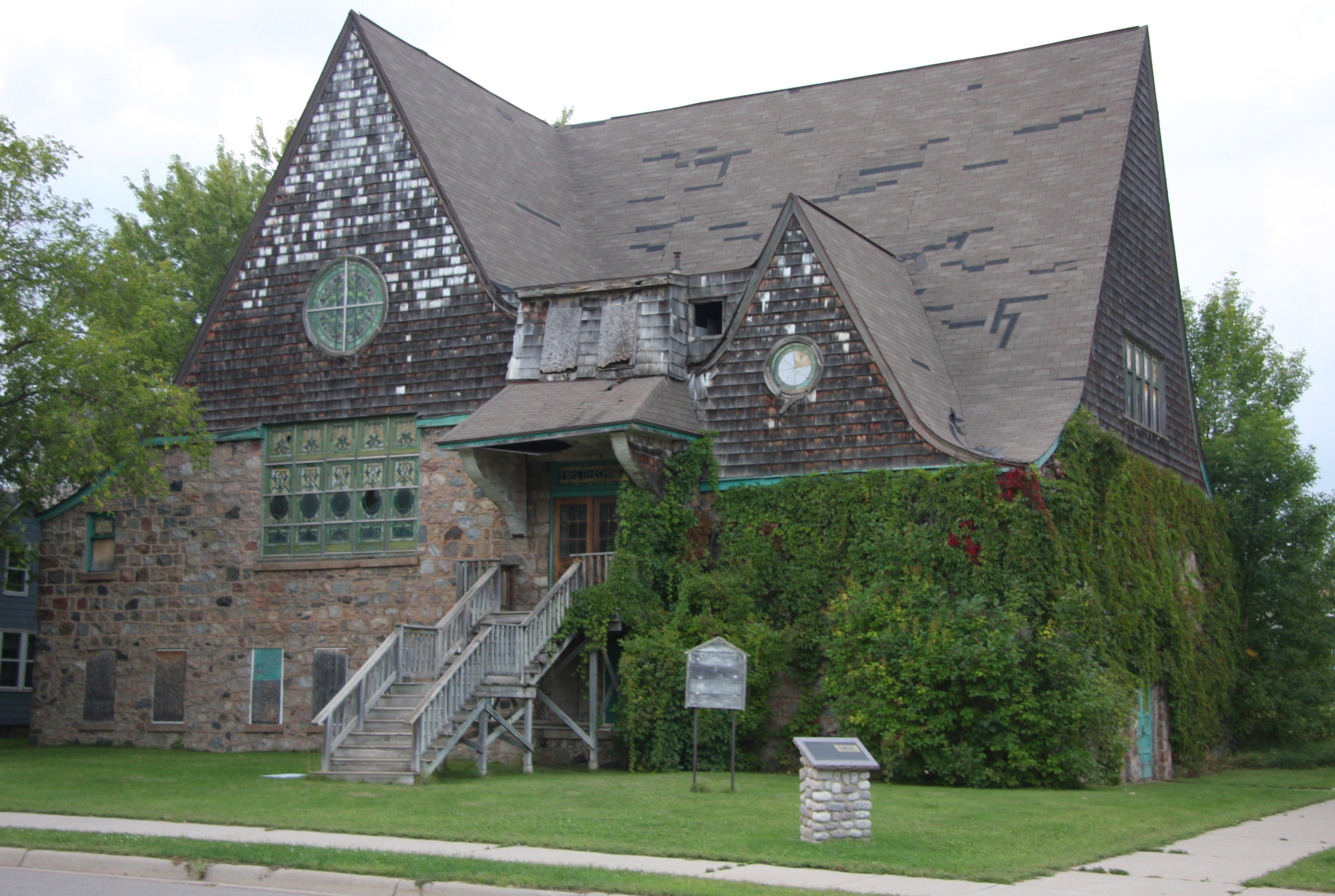
- The former church in 2015

- Location within Minnesota Location within the United States
- Location: NW Gayley and Cole Aves., Coleraine, Minnesota
- Coordinates: 47°17′13″N 93°25′40″W
- Area: less than one acre
- Built: 1908
- Architect: Frank Young
- Architectural style: Shingle Style
- MPS: Itasca County MRA
- NRHP reference No.: 82002971
- Added to NRHP: April 22, 1982

Coleraine Methodist Episcopal Church is a historic church at NW Gayley and Cole Avenues in Coleraine, Minnesota.

The church was built in 1908 through 1909 and served as a combination church and YMCA. The church was built on the Akron Plan, designed by Duluth architect Frank Young. The building is built with coursed fieldstone gathered near the building. The sanctuary has a series of rectangular stained glass windows, with large circular stained glass windows within the shingled gables. The interior has removable partitions separating the sanctuary from three classrooms. The YMCA facilities included a gymnasium, showers, an office, a reading room, and a parlor.

The planners of the church intended it to be an alternative for young people who would otherwise visit liquor establishments in nearby Bovey during their leisure time. The church has been in private ownership since 1974. The building was added to the National Register of Historic Places in 1982. The Minnesota State Historic Preservation Office called it "easily the largest and most impressive religious edifice on the Western Mesabi Iron Range."
