= Kocaeli B.B. Ice Arena =

Ice arena in İzmit, Kocaeli, Turkey

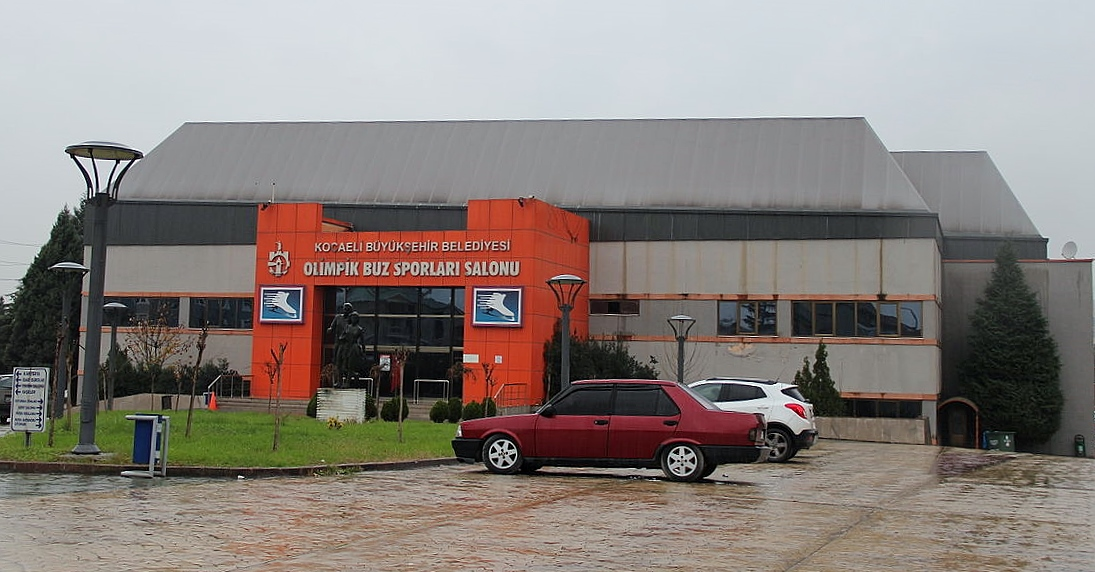
- Interactive map of Kocaeli B.B. Ice Arena
- Full name: Kocaeli Büyükşehir Belediyesi Olimpik Buz Sporları Salonu
- Former names: Kocaeli Buz Sporları Salonu
- Location: Şirintepe, İzmit, Kocaeli Province, Turkey
- Coordinates: 40.77385°N 29.95108°E
- Owner: Kocaeli Metropolitan Municipality
- Capacity: 3,600

Construction
- Opened: 1999

Tenants
- Kocaeli B.B. Kağıt Ice Hockey Men's team Kocaeli B.B. Kağıt Ice Hockey Women's team

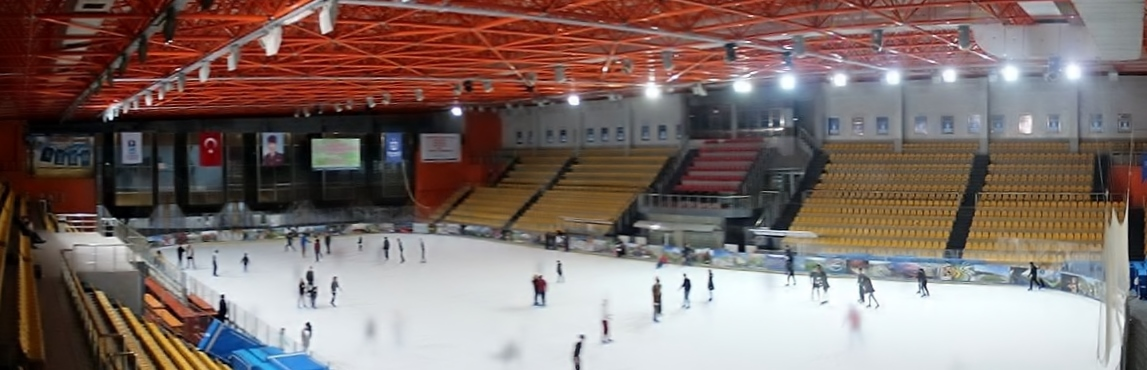
A view of the ice rink

Kocaeli B.B. Ice Arena (Turkish: Kocaeli B.B. Olimpik Buz Sporları Salonu), formerly Kocaeli Ice Rink, is an indoor ice skating and ice hockey arena located at Şirintepe neighborhood of Izmit in Kocaeli Province, Turkey. It was opened in 1999 and has a seating capacity of 3,600 spectators.

It was built according to International Ice Hockey Federation specifications, which are given in metric units (the Imperial units given are approximations): 61 m × 30 m (200 ft × 98 ft) with a corner radius of 8.5 m (28 ft).

The arena is home to Kocaeli B.B. Kağıt Ice Hockey Men's team, which plays in the Turkish Ice Hockey Super League. Turkish Ice Hockey Women's League matches are also played in the arena, which hosts the women's ice hockey team of the same club.

== International events hosted ==
- 1st Balkan (U-16) Ice Hockey Festival - August 29-September 3, 2012
- 2013 IIHF World U18 Championships Division III-Group B - February 7–10, 2013
- 2013 IIHF World Championship Division II-Group B - April 21–27, 2013

== See also ==
- Turkish Ice Hockey Super League
- Turkish Ice Hockey Federation
