= Mike Antonovich (ice hockey) =

American ice hockey player (born 1951)

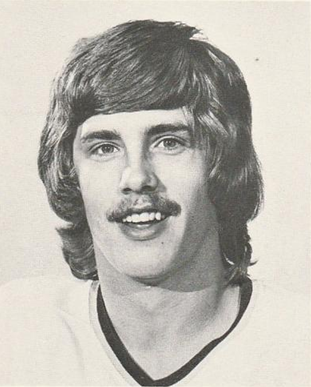
- Born: October 18, 1951 (age 74) Calumet, Minnesota, U.S.
- Height: 5 ft 8 in (173 cm)
- Weight: 165 lb (75 kg; 11 st 11 lb)
- Position: Center
- Shot: Left
- Played for: WHA; Minnesota Fighting Saints; Edmonton Oilers; WHA/NHL; New England/Hartford Whalers; NHL; Minnesota North Stars; New Jersey Devils
- National team: United States
- NHL draft: 113th overall, 1971; Minnesota North Stars
- Playing career: 1972–1984

Michael Joseph John "Antone" Antonovich (an-TOH-noh-vich; born October 18, 1951) is an American former professional hockey player, and coach. He was selected in the ninth round of the 1971 NHL Amateur Draft, 113th overall, by the Minnesota North Stars. He is currently a scout for the Columbus Blue Jackets.

== Amateur career ==
Antonovich played high school hockey for Greenway High School in Coleraine, Minnesota, where he led Greenway to 3 straight Minnesota State High School Hockey Tourney trips, winning the State Championships in 1967 and 1968.

After High School, Antonovich spent three seasons playing for the University of Minnesota, where he was tutored by coaches Glen Sonmor and Herb Brooks. Despite being drafted by the North Stars, when Antonovich turned professional he joined the Minnesota Fighting Saints of the WHA.

== Professional career ==
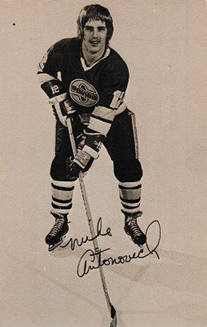
Antonovich for Minnesota Fighting Saints

Antonovich played most of his professional career in the WHA, with the Fighting Saints, Edmonton Oilers and New England Whalers. He also appeared in NHL games with the North Stars, Hartford Whalers and New Jersey Devils, in addition to minor league games in the AHL and CHL. While playing professionally Antonovich also represented the United States at the 1976, 1977 and 1982 Ice Hockey World Championships.

== Coaching and scouting ==
Antonovich spent three seasons as an assistant coach in the International Hockey League, coaching the Minnesota Moose and Quad City Mallards. He joined the amateur scouting staff of the St. Louis Blues in 1997, a position he still holds.

== Political career ==
In November 2008, Antonovich defeated incumbent John Sloan, and became the mayor of Coleraine, Minnesota. He has stated that he has no political motivations beyond his current position; he served for a number of years.

== Awards and achievements ==
- Played in 1978 WHA All-Star Game
- CHL Second All-Star Team (1982)

== Career statistics ==
=== Regular season and playoffs ===
			Regular season					Playoffs
Season	Team	League	GP	G	A	Pts	PIM	GP	G	A	Pts	PIM
1966–67	Greenway High School	HS-MN	—	—	—	—	—	—	—	—	—	—
1967–68	Greenway High School	HS-MN	—	—	—	—	—	—	—	—	—	—
1968–69	Greenway High School	HS-MN	—	—	—	—	—	—	—	—	—	—
1969–70	University of Minnesota	B-10	32	23	20	43	60	2	1	0	1	0
1970–71	University of Minnesota	B-10	32	14	18	32	20	—	—	—	—	—
1971–72	University of Minnesota	B-10	13	8	2	10	19	—	—	—	—	—
1972–73	Minnesota Fighting Saints	WHA	75	20	19	39	46	6	3	0	3	0
1973–74	Minnesota Fighting Saints	WHA	68	21	29	50	4	11	1	4	5	4
1974–75	Minnesota Fighting Saints	WHA	67	24	26	50	20	12	1	4	5	2
1975–76	Minnesota North Stars	NHL	12	0	2	2	8	—	—	—	—	—
1975–76	Minnesota Fighting Saints	WHA	57	25	21	46	18	—	—	—	—	—
1976–77	Edmonton Oilers	WHA	7	1	1	2	0	—	—	—	—	—
1976–77	New England Whalers	WHA	26	12	9	21	10	5	2	2	4	4
1976–77	Minnesota Fighting Saints	WHA	42	27	21	48	28	—	—	—	—	—
1977–78	New England Whalers	WHA	75	32	35	67	32	14	10	7	17	4
1978–79	New England Whalers	WHA	69	20	27	47	35	10	5	3	8	14
1978–79	Springfield Indians	AHL	7	2	3	5	2	—	—	—	—	—
1979–80	Springfield Indians	AHL	24	14	6	20	35	—	—	—	—	—
1979–80	Hartford Whalers	NHL	5	0	1	1	2	—	—	—	—	—
1980–81	Tulsa Oilers	CHL	60	28	32	60	36	8	1	2	3	2
1981–82	Minnesota North Stars	NHL	2	0	0	0	0	—	—	—	—	—
1981–82	Nashville South Stars	CHL	80	29	77	106	76	3	0	1	1	2
1982–83	New Jersey Devils	NHL	30	7	7	14	11	—	—	—	—	—
1982–83	Wichita Wind	CHL	10	8	12	20	0	—	—	—	—	—
1983–84	Maine Mariners	AHL	25	17	13	30	8	17	4	8	12	8
1983–84	New Jersey Devils	NHL	38	3	5	8	16	—	—	—	—	—
1992–93	Minnesota Iron Rangers	AHA	2	0	2	2	2	—	—	—	—	—
1995–96	Quad City Mallards	CoHL	2	0	1	1	4	—	—	—	—	—
WHA totals			486	182	188	370	193	58	22	20	42	28
NHL totals			87	10	15	25	37	—	—	—	—	—

=== International ===
Year	Team	Event	GP	G	A	Pts	PIM
1976	United States	WC	10	1	3	4	14
1977	United States	WC	4	0	0	0	0
1982	United States	WC	7	0	0	0	6
Senior totals			21	1	3	4	20

== Coaching statistics ==
Season	Team	Lge	Type
1995-96	Minnesota Moose	IHL	Assistant
1996-97	Phoenix Roadrunners	IHL	Assistant
