= Marcell Township, Itasca County, Minnesota =

Marcell Township, Minnesota
- Township
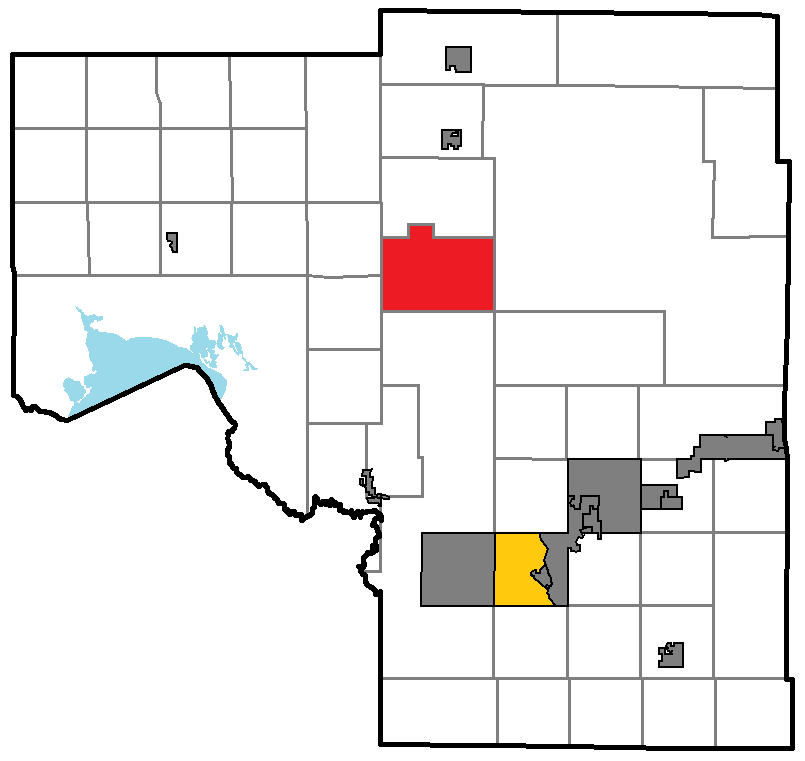
- Location of Marcell Township, within Itasca County, Minnesota
- Coordinates: 47°35′36″N 93°40′21″W
- Country: United States
- State: Minnesota
- County: Itasca

Area
  - Total: 57.2 sq mi (148.1 km^{2})
  - Land: 47.9 sq mi (124.1 km^{2})
  - Water: 9.3 sq mi (24.0 km^{2})
- Elevation: 1,355 ft (413 m)

Population (2020)
  - Total: 474
  - Density: 9.89/sq mi (3.82/km^{2})
- Time zone: UTC-6 (Central (CST))
  - Summer (DST): UTC-5 (CDT)
- ZIP code: 56657
- Area code: 218
- FIPS code: 27-40472
- GNIS feature ID: 0664913

Marcell Township is a township in Itasca County, Minnesota, United States. The population was 474 at the 2020 census.

Marcell Township was named for Andrew Marcell, a railroad conductor.

== Geography ==
According to the United States Census Bureau, the township has a total area of 57.2 square miles (148.1 km^{2}), of which 47.9 square miles (124.1 km^{2}) is land and 9.3 square miles (24.0 km^{2}), or 16.21%, is water.

== Demographics ==
At the 2000 census there were 394 people, 179 households, and 132 families living in the township. The population density was 8.2 people per square mile (3.2/km^{2}). There were 567 housing units at an average density of 11.8/sq mi (4.6/km^{2}). The racial makeup of the township was 98.98% White, 0.51% African American, 0.25% Native American, and 0.25% from two or more races. Of the 179 households 17.9% had children under the age of 18 living with them, 68.2% were married couples living together, 5.0% had a female householder with no husband present, and 25.7% were non-families. 23.5% of households were one person and 8.4% were one person aged 65 or older. The average household size was 2.18 and the average family size was 2.53.

The age distribution was 14.0% under the age of 18, 3.6% from 18 to 24, 18.0% from 25 to 44, 40.4% from 45 to 64, and 24.1% 65 or older. The median age was 53 years. For every 100 females, there were 106.3 males. For every 100 females age 18 and over, there were 114.6 males.

The median household income was $39,167 and the median family income was $41,719. Males had a median income of $31,250 versus $30,625 for females. The per capita income for the township was $21,010. About 9.2% of families and 8.5% of the population were below the poverty line, including 7.8% of those under age 18 and none of those age 65 or over.
