= Taconite, Minnesota =

City in Minnesota, United States

Taconite
- City
- Nickname: Hub of the Nation
- Location of the city of Taconite within Itasca County, Minnesota
- Coordinates: 47°19′0″N 93°21′44″W
- Country: United States
- State: Minnesota
- County: Itasca

Area
  - Total: 29.62 sq mi (76.72 km^{2})
  - Land: 27.97 sq mi (72.45 km^{2})
  - Water: 1.65 sq mi (4.28 km^{2})
- Elevation: 1,401 ft (427 m)

Population (2020)
  - Total: 651
  - Density: 23.3/sq mi (8.99/km^{2})
- Time zone: UTC-6 (Central (CST))
  - Summer (DST): UTC-5 (CDT)
- ZIP code: 55786
- Area code: 218
- FIPS code: 27-64048
- GNIS feature ID: 0658590

Taconite (/ˈtækənaɪt/ TAK-ə-nyte) is a city in Itasca County, Minnesota, United States. The population was 651 at the 2020 census.

U.S. Highway 169 serves as a main route in the community.

== History ==
Taconite was established in 1907 and is one of several whistlestop cities located on Highway 169 collectively known as 'Range Cities'. These cities were branded as such when they sprang up in parallel with the nearby iron mining operations that began in Coleraine and headed in a northeasterly direction. The mines and cities comprise part of what is known as Minnesota's Iron Range, specifically the Mesabi Range.

Taconite is a derivation of the word Taconic, which is related to the Taconic Mountains of the eastern United States and contain similar geologic formations. 'Taconic' is based on a Native American word documented in use as early as 1685. It can be spelled a number of ways. These spelling include: Tachkanick, Taghconic, K'takantshan, Tachanizen, Tackinick, Tocconuc, Taughkaughnick, Taghonic, Toghconnuck, Taconick, Toghconnuc, Tacon'ic, Taghkan'nuc, Taconyte, Taghkanick, and Tac'onite

Taconite abuts what was originally called the Holman Mine, with independently operated mines located on either side of the city.

With closure of the mines, the withdrawal of dewatering equipment led to rain, runoff and underground springs raising water levels in the nearby mine pits. The abandoned pits that surround Taconite (including the Holman Mine) have been filled and joined into what is now called the Canisteo Mine complex.

== Geography ==
According to the United States Census Bureau, the city has a total area of 20.62 square miles (53.41 km^{2}), of which 19.91 square miles (51.57 km^{2}) is land and 0.71 square miles (1.84 km^{2}) is water.

Taconite is located adjacent to the Cannisteo mine pit. It was established in 1907 and refers to itself as the "Hub of the Nation".

== Demographics ==
Historical population
Census	Pop.	Note	%±
1910	549		—
1920	621		13.1%
1930	485		−21.9%
1940	375		−22.7%
1950	322		−14.1%
1960	376		16.8%
1970	352		−6.4%
1980	331		−6.0%
1990	310		−6.3%
2000	315		1.6%
2010	360		14.3%
2020	651		80.8%
U.S. Decennial Census

=== 2010 census ===
As of the census of 2010, there were 360 people, 151 households, and 95 families living in the city. The population density was 18.1 inhabitants per square mile (7.0/km^{2}). There were 162 housing units at an average density of 8.1 per square mile (3.1/km^{2}). The racial makeup of the city was 90.8% White, 1.1% African American, 1.9% Native American, 0.8% Pacific Islander, 0.3% from other races, and 5.0% from two or more races. Hispanic or Latino of any race were 1.1% of the population.

There were 151 households, of which 35.8% had children under the age of 18 living with them, 47.7% were married couples living together, 9.9% had a female householder with no husband present, 5.3% had a male householder with no wife present, and 37.1% were non-families. 33.1% of all households were made up of individuals, and 10.6% had someone living alone who was 65 years of age or older. The average household size was 2.38 and the average family size was 3.04.

The median age in the city was 35.5 years. 27.8% of residents were under the age of 18; 6.4% were between the ages of 18 and 24; 28.6% were from 25 to 44; 25.3% were from 45 to 64; and 11.9% were 65 years of age or older. The gender makeup of the city was 50.3% male and 49.7% female.

=== 2000 census ===
As of the census of 2000, there were 315 people, 136 households, and 87 families living in the city. The population density was 64.5 inhabitants per square mile (24.9/km^{2}). There were 150 housing units at an average density of 30.7 per square mile (11.9/km^{2}). The racial makeup of the city was 94.92% White, 0.32% Native American, 0.63% Asian, 0.63% Pacific Islander, 0.32% from other races, and 3.17% from two or more races. Hispanic or Latino of any race were 0.32% of the population.

There were 136 households, out of which 32.4% had children under the age of 18 living with them, 49.3% were married couples living together, 8.1% had a female householder with no husband present, and 36.0% were non-families. 31.6% of all households were made up of individuals, and 15.4% had someone living alone who was 65 years of age or older. The average household size was 2.32 and the average family size was 2.91.

In the city, the population was spread out, with 24.4% under the age of 18, 8.6% from 18 to 24, 30.5% from 25 to 44, 18.1% from 45 to 64, and 18.4% who were 65 years of age or older. The median age was 38 years. For every 100 females, there were 94.4 males. For every 100 females age 18 and over, there were 100.0 males.

The median income for a household in the city was $30,250, and the median income for a family was $50,417. Males had a median income of $32,500 versus $20,357 for females. The per capita income for the city was $16,357. About 14.9% of families and 17.1% of the population were below the poverty line, including 34.2% of those under age 18 and 3.2% of those age 65 or over.

== Notable person ==
James "Slim" Troumbly - ice hockey player who competed in the 1950 IIHF Men's Ice Hockey World Championship.
