= Calumet, Minnesota =

City in Minnesota, United States

Calumet
- City
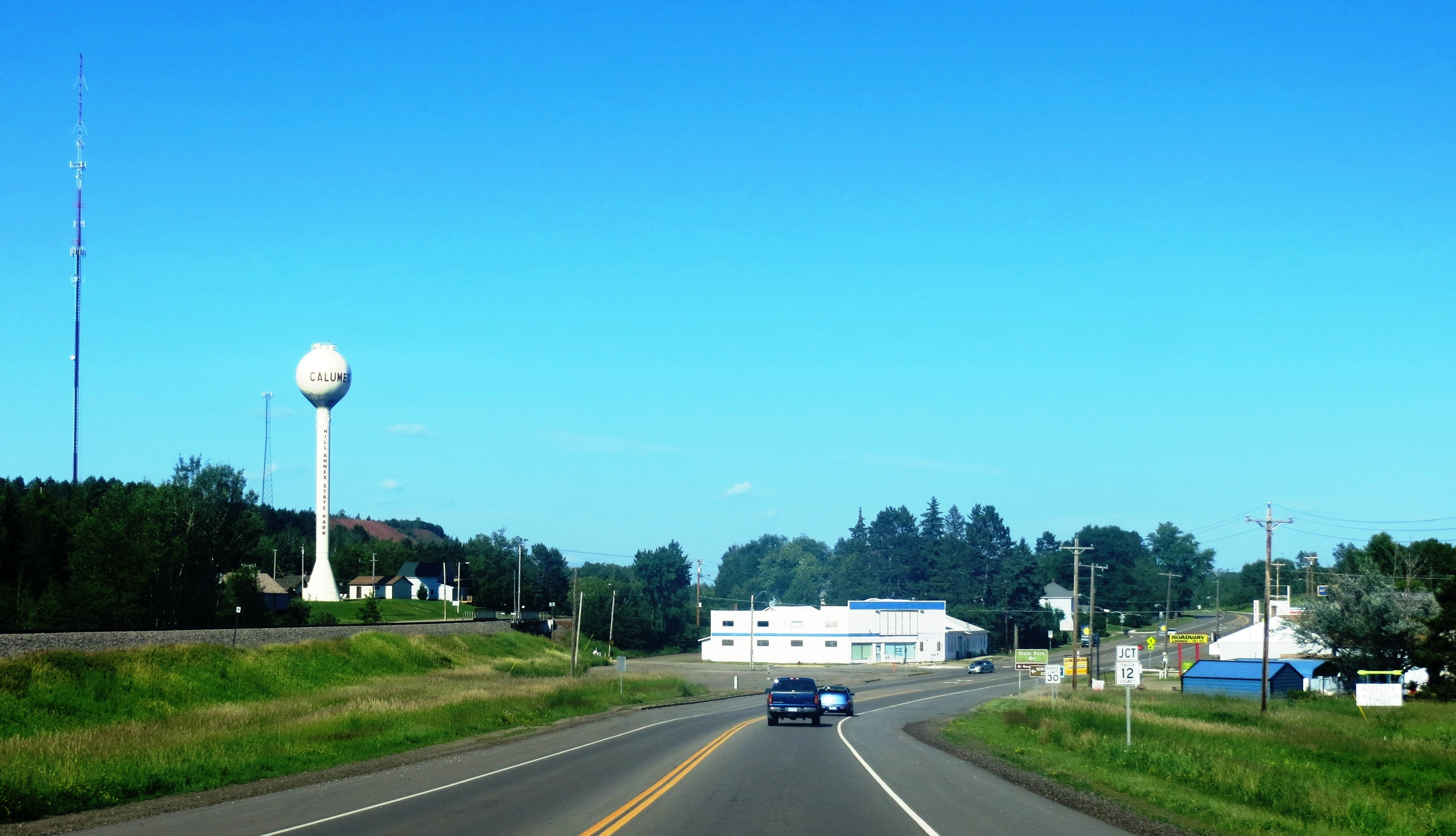

- Location of the city of Calumet within Itasca County, Minnesota
- Coordinates: 47°19′16″N 93°16′28″W
- Country: United States
- State: Minnesota
- County: Itasca

Area
  - Total: 1.88 sq mi (4.86 km^{2})
  - Land: 1.80 sq mi (4.66 km^{2})
  - Water: 0.077 sq mi (0.20 km^{2})
- Elevation: 1,381 ft (421 m)

Population (2020)
  - Total: 334
  - Density: 185.5/sq mi (71.64/km^{2})
- Time zone: UTC-6 (Central (CST))
  - Summer (DST): UTC-5 (CDT)
- ZIP code: 55716
- Area code: 218
- FIPS code: 27-09316
- GNIS feature ID: 0655597
- Website: https://calumetmn.myruralwater.com/

Calumet (/kæljuˈmɛt/ kal-yoo-MET) is a city in Itasca County, Minnesota, United States. The population was 334 at the 2020 census.

== History ==
A post office called Calumet has been in operation since 1908. The city was named after the French, colonial-era word often used for a Native American ceremonial pipe.

== Geography ==
According to the United States Census Bureau, the city has a total area of 1.58 square miles (4.09 km^{2}), of which 1.57 square miles (4.07 km^{2}) is land and 0.01 square miles (0.03 km^{2}) is water.

U.S. Highway 169 serves as a main route in the community. Hill-Annex Mine State Park is just outside the town.

== Demographics ==
Historical population
Census	Pop.	Note	%±
1910	245		—
1920	445		81.6%
1930	805		80.9%
1940	946		17.5%
1950	854		−9.7%
1960	799		−6.4%
1970	460		−42.4%
1980	469		2.0%
1990	382		−18.6%
2000	383		0.3%
2010	367		−4.2%
2020	334		−9.0%
U.S. Decennial Census

=== 2010 census ===
As of the census of 2010, there were 367 people, 160 households, and 90 families living in the city. The population density was 233.8 inhabitants per square mile (90.3/km^{2}). There were 178 housing units at an average density of 113.4 per square mile (43.8/km^{2}). The racial makeup of the city was 95.9% White, 0.3% African American, 2.2% Native American, and 1.6% from two or more races. Hispanic or Latino of any race were 1.6% of the population.

There were 160 households, of which 28.1% had children under the age of 18 living with them, 35.0% were married couples living together, 15.6% had a female householder with no husband present, 5.6% had a male householder with no wife present, and 43.8% were non-families. 32.5% of all households were made up of individuals, and 11.9% had someone living alone who was 65 years of age or older. The average household size was 2.29 and the average family size was 2.87.

The median age in the city was 39.5 years. 25.1% of residents were under the age of 18; 6.7% were between the ages of 18 and 24; 26.3% were from 25 to 44; 26.6% were from 45 to 64; and 15% were 65 years of age or older. The gender makeup of the city was 49.0% male and 51.0% female.

=== 2000 census ===
As of the census of 2000, there were 383 people, 162 households, and 98 families living in the city. The population density was 240.7 inhabitants per square mile (92.9/km^{2}). There were 178 housing units at an average density of 111.9 per square mile (43.2/km^{2}). The racial makeup of the city was 95.04% White, 2.35% Native American, 0.26% Asian, 1.31% from other races, and 1.04% from two or more races. Hispanic or Latino of any race were 1.83% of the population.

There were 162 households, out of which 32.7% had children under the age of 18 living with them, 42.0% were married couples living together, 14.2% had a female householder with no husband present, and 39.5% were non-families. 34.6% of all households were made up of individuals, and 18.5% had someone living alone who was 65 years of age or older. The average household size was 2.33 and the average family size was 3.02.

In the city, the population was spread out, with 28.5% under the age of 18, 8.6% from 18 to 24, 25.6% from 25 to 44, 19.3% from 45 to 64, and 18.0% who were 65 years of age or older. The median age was 35 years. For every 100 females, there were 89.6 males. For every 100 females age 18 and over, there were 91.6 males.

The median income for a household in the city was $22,250, and the median income for a family was $35,000. Males had a median income of $24,625 versus $18,958 for females. The per capita income for the city was $12,293. About 16.0% of families and 17.5% of the population were below the poverty line, including 13.8% of those under age 18 and 18.3% of those age 65 or over.

== Notable person ==
Former NHL player Mike Antonovich is from Calumet.
