= Coleraine, Minnesota =

City in Minnesota, United States

Coleraine
- City
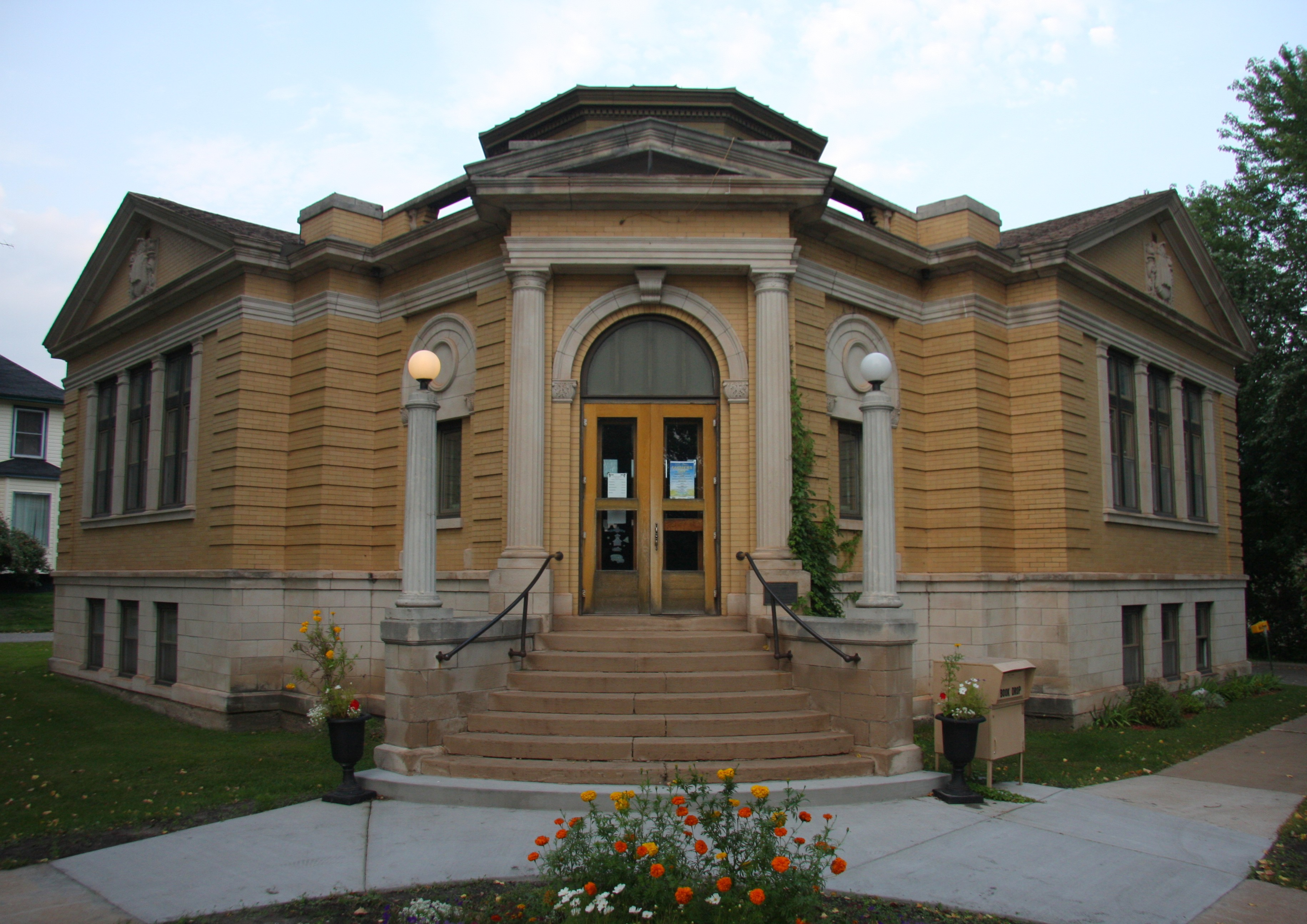
- Carnegie library at Clemson and Cole Avenues in Coleraine, Minnesota

- Location of the city of Coleraine within Itasca County, Minnesota
- Coordinates: 47°17′27″N 93°25′51″W
- Country: United States
- State: Minnesota
- County: Itasca

Area
  - Total: 15.84 sq mi (41.03 km^{2})
  - Land: 15.35 sq mi (39.76 km^{2})
  - Water: 0.49 sq mi (1.27 km^{2})
- Elevation: 1,325 ft (404 m)

Population (2020)
  - Total: 2,006
  - Density: 130.7/sq mi (50.45/km^{2})
- Time zone: UTC-6 (Central (CST))
  - Summer (DST): UTC-5 (CDT)
- ZIP code: 55722
- Area code: 218
- FIPS code: 27-12502
- GNIS feature ID: 0655778
- Website: City of Coleraine MN Web Portal

Coleraine is a city in Itasca County, Minnesota, United States, near Grand Rapids. The population was 2,006 at the 2020 census. The community was named after Thomas F. Cole, President of the Oliver Iron Mining Company.

U.S. Highway 169 serves as a main route in Coleraine.

== History ==
A post office called Coleraine has been in operation since 1906. The city was named for Thomas F. Cole, a businessperson in the mining industry.

== Geography ==
According to the United States Census Bureau, the city has a total area of 16.64 square miles (43.10 km^{2}), of which 16.13 square miles (41.78 km^{2}) is land and 0.51 square miles (1.32 km^{2}) is water.

The community of Gunn is located within the southern portion of the city of Coleraine.

== Demographics ==
Historical population
Census	Pop.	Note	%±
1910	1,613		—
1920	1,300		−19.4%
1930	1,243		−4.4%
1940	1,325		6.6%
1950	1,321		−0.3%
1960	1,346		1.9%
1970	1,086		−19.3%
1980	1,116		2.8%
1990	1,041		−6.7%
2000	1,110		6.6%
2010	1,970		77.5%
2020	2,006		1.8%
U.S. Decennial Census; 2013 Estimate

=== 2020 census ===
As of the 2020 census, Coleraine had a population of 2,006. The median age was 38.4 years. 26.3% of residents were under the age of 18 and 18.5% of residents were 65 years of age or older. For every 100 females there were 95.5 males, and for every 100 females age 18 and over there were 91.0 males age 18 and over.

0.0% of residents lived in urban areas, while 100.0% lived in rural areas.

There were 777 households in Coleraine, of which 32.6% had children under the age of 18 living in them. Of all households, 53.2% were married-couple households, 15.3% were households with a male householder and no spouse or partner present, and 21.6% were households with a female householder and no spouse or partner present. About 24.5% of all households were made up of individuals and 9.8% had someone living alone who was 65 years of age or older.

There were 841 housing units, of which 7.6% were vacant. The homeowner vacancy rate was 2.0% and the rental vacancy rate was 6.9%.

Racial composition as of the 2020 census
Race	Number	Percent
White	1,799	89.7%
Black or African American	9	0.4%
American Indian and Alaska Native	45	2.2%
Asian	4	0.2%
Native Hawaiian and Other Pacific Islander	0	0.0%
Some other race	7	0.3%
Two or more races	142	7.1%
Hispanic or Latino (of any race)	32	1.6%

=== 2010 census ===
As of the census of 2010, there were 1,970 people, 768 households, and 550 families living in the city. The population density was 122.1 inhabitants per square mile (47.1/km^{2}). There were 831 housing units at an average density of 51.5 per square mile (19.9/km^{2}). The racial makeup of the city was 95.4% White, 0.4% African American, 1.5% Native American, 0.2% Asian, 0.2% from other races, and 2.4% from two or more races. Hispanic or Latino of any race were 1.4% of the population.

There were 768 households, of which 34.4% had children under the age of 18 living with them, 56.0% were married couples living together, 9.5% had a female householder with no husband present, 6.1% had a male householder with no wife present, and 28.4% were non-families. 22.9% of all households were made up of individuals, and 8.7% had someone living alone who was 65 years of age or older. The average household size was 2.54 and the average family size was 2.94.

The median age in the city was 38.8 years. 25.8% of residents were under the age of 18; 7.9% were between the ages of 18 and 24; 24.5% were from 25 to 44; 27.1% were from 45 to 64; and 14.7% were 65 years of age or older. The gender makeup of the city was 50.9% male and 49.1% female.

=== 2000 census ===
As of the census of 2000, there were 1,110 people, 443 households, and 317 families living in the city. The population density was 178.5 inhabitants per square mile (68.9/km^{2}). There were 462 housing units at an average density of 74.3 per square mile (28.7/km^{2}). The racial makeup of the city was 98.47% White, 0.54% Native American, 0.18% Asian, 0.09% from other races, and 0.72% from two or more races. Hispanic or Latino of any race were 0.81% of the population.

There were 443 households, out of which 32.7% had children under the age of 18 living with them, 59.1% were married couples living together, 9.9% had a female householder with no husband present, and 28.4% were non-families. 23.9% of all households were made up of individuals, and 13.5% had someone living alone who was 65 years of age or older. The average household size was 2.51 and the average family size was 3.00.

In the city, the population was spread out, with 25.9% under the age of 18, 8.5% from 18 to 24, 26.0% from 25 to 44, 22.5% from 45 to 64, and 17.1% who were 65 years of age or older. The median age was 37 years. For every 100 females, there were 98.6 males. For every 100 females age 18 and over, there were 94.6 males.

The median income for a household in the city was $38,681, and the median income for a family was $52,361. Males had a median income of $39,875 versus $22,353 for females. The per capita income for the city was $16,514. About 6.4% of families and 9.8% of the population were below the poverty line, including 10.7% of those under age 18 and 11.2% of those age 65 or over.
