= 2009–10 Serbian Hockey League season =

2009-2010 Serbian Hockey League Season
- League: Serbian Hockey League
- Sport: Ice hockey
- Teams: 4

Serbian Hockey League seasons
- ← 2008-09 2010-11 →

The Serbian Hockey League Season for 2009-2010 was the last season that was played in 2009. It differed a lot from the previous season, as HK Beostar and HK Novi Sad fell out from the league. Along with these two, HK Partizan left the regular season, in lieu of playing the stronger Slohokej Liga. HK Partizan will rejoin the competition in the playoffs. However, HK Subotica returned to the league, after a five-year absence. The league started on November 27, 2009.

== Teams ==
- HK Spartak
- HK Vojvodina
- KHK Crvena Zvezda
- HK Partizan (playoffs only)

== Standings ==
Rk	Team	GP	W	OTW	OTL	L	GF	GA	Pts
1.	HK Vojvodina	8	8	0	0	0	37	12	24
2.	HK Spartak	8	2	1	1	4	18	30	9
3.	KHK Crvena Zvezda	8	0	1	1	6	13	26	3

== Playoffs ==
=== Round 1 ===
Spartak beat Zvezda 2-0

- KHK Crvena zvezda – HK Spartak 3:4 (1:2, 1:1, 1:0, 0:0, 0:1) SO

=== Round 2 ===
Spartak beat Vojvodina 2-1

- HK Spartak – HK Vojvodina 4:5 (2:2, 0:2, 2:0, 0:1) OT
- HK Vojvodina – HK Spartak 5:6 (4:1, 1:1, 0:3, 0:1) OT
- HK Vojvodina – HK Spartak 3:4 (1:1, 1:0, 1:2, 0:0, 0:1) SO

=== Finals ===
Spartak refused to play Partizan. Hence, Partizan won via forfeit, 2–0.

== Schedule and results ==
- Nov. 27, 2009 HK Spartak - KHK Crvena Zvezda 3:0 (0:0, 1:0, 2:0)
- Dec. 1, 2009 HK Spartak - HK Vojvodina 1:8 (0:2, 1:2, 0:4)
- Dec. 22, 2009 HK Vojvodina - HK Spartak 6:1 (0:0, 1:0, 5:1)
- Dec. 29, 2009 HK Spartak - KHK Crvena Zvezda 6:2 (1:0, 3:0, 2:2)
- Jan. 5, 2010 HK Spartak - HK Vojvodina 2:6 (1:1, 1:2, 0:3)
- Jan. 12, 2010 HK Vojvodina - HK Spartak 4:1 (2:1, 2:0, 0:0)
- Jan. 15, 2010 HK Vojvodina - HK Crvena Zvezda 2:1 (0:0, 0:0, 2:1)
- Jan. 19, 2010 HK Spartak – KHK Crvena zvezda 2:1 (0:1, 1:0, 0:0, 1:0) OT
- Jan. 22, 2010 HK Vojvodina – KHK Crvena Zvezda 4:2 (1:0, 1:2, 2:0)
- Jan. 24, 2010 HK Spartak – KHK Crvena Zvezda 2:3 (1:2, 1:0, 0:0, 0:1) OT
