= 2006–07 Serbian Hockey League season =

2006-2007 Serbian Hockey League Season
- League: Serbian Hockey League
- Sport: Ice hockey
- Regular-season winner: (Serbia) HK Partizan
- Champions: (Serbia) HK Partizan
- Runners-up: (Serbia) HK Vojvodina

Serbian Hockey League seasons
- ← 2005–06 2007–08 →

The Serbian Hockey League Season for 2006-2007 consisted of 16 games. It lasted from October 20 to January 6. In the end HK Partizan won. It was the first time that HK Beostar participated.

== Final standings ==
Rk	Team	GP	W	T	L	GF	GA	Pts
1.	HK Partizan	16	11	2	3	78	31	24
2.	KHK Crvena Zvezda	16	12	0	4	76	38	24
3.	HK Vojvodina	16	7	4	5	52	54	18
4.	HK Novi Sad	16	5	2	9	53	67	12
5.	HK Beostar	16	1	0	15	46	115	2

== Playoffs ==
There were two rounds in the playoffs- semifinals and finals.

=== Semifinals ===
- KHK Crvena Zvezda vs HK Partizan
- Game 1 Crvena Zvezda wins 4:3 (2:1, 2:1, 0:1)
- Game 2 Partizan wins 3:1 (0:0, 3:0, 0-1)
- Game 3 Partizan wins 6:0 (1:0, 1:0, 4:0)
- Partizan wins series 2-1
- HK Vojvodina vs HK Novi Sad
- Game 1 Vojvodina wins 4-1 (0:0,1:0,3:1)
- Game 2 Vojvodina wins 3:1 (0:0, 3:0, 0-1)
- Vojvodina wins series 2-0

=== Finals ===
- HK Partizan vs HK Vojvodina
- Game 1 Partizan wins 5:2 (2:0; 0:2; 3:0)
- Game 2 Partizan wins 5:2 (3:0, 1:0, 1:2)
- Game 3 Partizan wins 6:0

=== Third Place ===
- Crvena Zvezda vs Novi Sad

Game 1: Crvena Zvzeda wins 5:4 in overtime Game 2: Novi Sad wins 4:2 Game 3: Novi Sad wins 3:1

- Novi Sad wins series 2-1

== Schedule and results ==
- 20.10.2006 Vojvodina - Novi Sad 5 : 1
- 20.10.2006 Partizan - Beostar 6 : 0
- 24.10.2006 Crvena zvezda - Partizan 0 : 8
- 24.10.2006 Beostar - Vojvodina 3 : 4
- 27.10.2006 Beostar - Novi Sad 1 : 5
- 27.10.2006 Vojvodina - Crvena zvezda 7 : 2
- 31.10.2006 Novi Sad - Partizan 5 : 3
- 31.10.2006 Crvena zvezda - Beostar 9 : 4
- 03.11.2006 Vojvodina - Partizan 2 : 3
- 03.11.2006 Crvena zvezda - Novi Sad 1 : 5
- 07.11.2006 Beostar - Partizan 1 : 9
- 10.11.2006 Partizan - Crvena zvezda 3 : 0
- 10.11.2006 Vojvodina - Beostar 10 : 3
- 17.11.2006 Novi Sad - Beostar 5 : 2
- 17.11.2006 Crvena zvezda - Vojvodina 3 : 4
- 18.11.2006 Beostar - Partizan 0 : 9
- 21.11.2006 Partizan - Novi Sad 2 : 2
- 21.11.2006 Beostar - Crvena zvezda 5 : 7
- 24.11.2006 Partizan - Vojvodina 7 : 0
- 24.11.2006 Novi Sad - Crvena zvezda 2 : 4
- 28.11.2006 Novi Sad - Vojvodina 1 : 0
- 05.01.2007 Beostar - Novi Sad 6 : 5
- 05.01.2007 Vojvodina - Crvena zvezda 2 : 0
- 09.01.2007 Novi Sad - Partizan 4 : 2
- 12.01.2007 Vojvodina - Partizan 3 : 6
- 12.01.2007 Crvena zvezda - Novi Sad 4 : 4
- 16.01.2007 Partizan - Beostar 6 : 3
- 17.01.2007 Novi Sad - Vojvodina 0 : 8
- 19.01.2007 Partizan - Crvena zvezda 4 : 2
- 19.01.2007 Vojvodina - Beostar 11 : 4
- 23.01.2007 Crvena zvezda - Partizan 4 : 6
- 23.01.2007 Beostar - Vojvodina 1 : 7
- 26.01.2007 Novi Sad - Beostar 7 : 4
- 26.01.2007 Crvena zvezda - Vojvodina 0 : 2
- 30.01.2007 Partizan - Novi Sad 2 : 2
- 30.01.2007 Beostar - Crvena zvezda 4 : 7
- 02.02.2007 Partizan - Vojvodina 2 : 3
- 02.02.2007 Novi Sad - Crvena zvezda 2 : 2
- 06.02.2007 Vojvodina - Novi Sad 8 : 2
- 06.02.2007 Crvena zvezda - Beostar 8 : 5
