= 2005–06 Serbian Hockey League season =

2005-2006 Serbian Hockey League Season
- League: Serbian Hockey League
- Sport: Ice hockey
- Regular-season winner: (Serbia and Montenegro) HK Partizan
- Champions: (Serbia and Montenegro) HK Partizan
- Runners-up: (Serbia and Montenegro) KHK Crvena Zvezda

Serbian Hockey League seasons
- ← 2004-05 2006-07 →

The Serbian Hockey League Season for 2005-2006 consisted of 12 games. It lasted from November 15 to December 16. In the end HK Partizan won. HK Spartak Subotica eventually fell out from the competition because of various problems - mainly that they lacked an indoor arena.

== Final standings ==
Standings including Spartak.

Rk	Team	GP	W	T	L	GF	GA	Pts
1.	HK Partizan	15	11	1	3	102	30	23
2.	HK Vojvodina	15	9	2	4	83	46	20
3.	KHK Crvena Zvezda	14	9	1	4	79	32	19
4.	HK Novi Sad	15	4	0	11	66	68	8
5.	HK Subotica	11	0	0	11	18	172	0

Standings, in the case that one does not count Spartak.

Rk	Team	GP	W	T	L	GF	GA	Pts
1.	HK Partizan	12	8	1	3	53	29	17
2.	KHK Crvena Zvezda	12	7	1	4	40	30	15
3.	HK Vojvodina	12	6	2	4	42	36	14
4.	HK Novi Sad	12	1	0	11	23	63	2

== Playoffs ==
=== semifinals ===
- 21.02.06 Beograd: HK Crvena Zvezda Beograd - HK Vojvodina Novi Sad
- 22.02.06 Beograd: HK Partizan Beograd - HK Novi Sad
- 24.02.06 Novi Sad: HK Vojvodina Novi Sad - HK Crvena Zvezda Beograd
- 25.02.06 Novi Sad: HK Novi Sad - HK Partizan Beograd
- 28.02.06 Beograd: HK Crvena Zvezda Beograd - HK Vojvodina Novi Sad
- 01.03.06 Beograd: HK Partizan Beograd - HK Novi Sad
- Partizn - Novi Sad - 6:3 (0:1,3:1,3:1)
- Novi Sad - Partizan - 3:4 OT
- Partizan wins 2:0
- Crvena Zvezda - Vojvodina 2:4 (0:2,2:2,0:0)
- Vojvodina - Crvena Zvezda 3:9 (1:2,1:4,1:3)
- Crvena Zvezda - Vojvodina 6:0 (0:0,2:0,4:0)
- Zvezda wins 2:1

=== finals ===
- Partizan - Crvena Zvezda 5:4 (2:1,2:2,0:1;1:0) OT.
- Crvena Zvezda - Partizan 1:3 (0:2,1:1,0:0)
- Partizan wins 2-0

== Schedule and results ==
- 15.11.05. Vojvodina - Partizan 3:3 (0:1,1:2,2:0)
- 15.11.05. Crvena Zvezda – Novi Sad 7:5 (3:0,1:1,3:4) (friendly)
- 18.11.05. Partizan - Spartak (odlozeno)
- 18.11.05. Vojvodina – Crvena Zvezda 2:1 (1:0,0:0,1:1)
- 22.11.05. Crvena Zvezda - Partizan 2:4 (1:2,0:0,1:2)
- 22.11.05. Novi Sad - Spartak (odlozeno)
- 25.11.05. Novi Sad - Partizan 2:6 (0:3,0:3,2:0)
- 25.11.05. Vojvodina - Spartak 18:2 (5:0,5:2,8:0)
- 29.11.05. Novi Sad - Vojvodina 2:4 (0:1,1:0,1:3)
- 29.11.05. Crvena Zvezda - Spartak 22:2 (4:1,9:1,9:0)
- 02.12.05. Partizan - . Vojvodina b.b. rolba
- 02.12.05. Novi Sad - Crvena Zvezda b.b. trener
- 06.12.05. Spartak - Partizan 0:24 (0:7,0:6,0:11)
- 06.12.05. Crvena Zvezda - . Vojvodina 3:2 (0:1,1:0,2:1)
- 09.12.05. Partizan - Crvena Zvezda 5:2 (0:0,2:1.3:1)
- 09.12.05. Spartak - Novi Sad 0:17
- 13.12.05. Vojvodina - Spartak 14:5 (5:1, 6:1, 3:3)
- 13.12.05. Partizan - Novi Sad 9:3 (4:2,4:1,1:0)
- 16.12.05. Spartak - Crvena Zvezda (odlozeno)
- 16.12.05. Vojvodina - Novi Sad 6:2 (1:0,3:0,1:2)
