= 1996–97 Serbian Hockey League season =

1996-1997 Serbian Hockey League Season
- League: Serbian Hockey League
- Sport: Ice hockey
- Regular-season winner: (Federal Republic of Yugoslavia) KHK Crvena Zvezda
- Champions: (Federal Republic of Yugoslavia) KHK Crvena Zvezda
- Runners-up: (Federal Republic of Yugoslavia) HK Vojvodina

Serbian Hockey League seasons
- 1995-96 1997-98

The Serbian Hockey League Season for 1996-1997 was the sixth season of the league. Five teams participated. KHK Crvenza Zvezda won in the end. This was the first season in which HK Taš participated.

== Teams ==
- HK Partizan
- KHK Crvena Zvezda
- HK Vojvodina
- HK Spartak Subotica
- HK Taš

== Regular season standings ==
Rk	Team	GP	W	T	L	GF	GA	Pts
1.	KHK Crvena Zvezda	12	9	1	2	89	48	19
2.	HK Vojvodina	12	9	0	3	103	37	18
3.	HK Partizan	12	8	0	4	97	71	16
4.	HK Taš	12	2	1	9	58	90	3
4.	HK Spartak	12	1	0	11	38	100	2

== Playoffs ==
=== Semifinals ===
- Crvena Zvezda defeated Taš in a series. 3-7 4-2 5-0
- HK Vojvodina defeated Partizan in a series. 11-3 6-5

=== Finals ===
Red Star swept Vojvodina in the finals.

- Game 1 - 6-2
- Game 2 - 11-6
