= 2014–15 IIHF Continental Cup =

18th IIHF Continental Cup

2014–2015 IIHF Continental Cup
Tournament details
- Dates: 26 September 2014 – 11 January 2015
- Teams: 16

Final positions
- Champions: (Belarus) Neman Grodno (1st title)
- Runners-up: (Germany) Fischtown Pinguins
- Third place: (France) Ducs d'Angers
- Fourth place: (Kazakhstan) Yertis Pavlodar

Tournament statistics
- Games played: 36
- Goals scored: 256 (7.11 per game)
- Attendance: 36,862 (1,024 per game)
- Scoring leader: (Belarus) Andrei Korshunov (8 points)

The 2014–15 Continental Cup was the 18th edition of the IIHF Continental Cup. The season started on 26 September 2014. The Super Final was played in Bremerhaven, Germany on 9–11 January 2015. The tournament was won by Neman Grodno, who led the final group. They also qualified for the 2015–16 Champions Hockey League.

== Qualified teams ==
Team	Qualification
Enter in the third round
(Italy) Ritten Sport	2013–14 Elite A winners
(Denmark) Herning Blue Fox	2013–14 Metal Ligaen runners-up
(Kazakhstan) Yertis Pavlodar	2013–14 Kazakhstan Hockey Championship winners
(Belarus) Neman Grodno	2013–14 Belarusian Extraleague winners
(France) Ducs d'Angers	2013–14 Ligue Magnus runners-up
(Ukraine) ~~Kompanion-Naftogaz~~^{[a]}	2013–14 Ukrainian Hockey Championship winners
Enter in the second round
(Germany) Fischtown Pinguins	2013–14 DEL2 winners
(United Kingdom) Belfast Giants	2013–14 Elite League winners
(Netherlands) Tilburg Trappers	2013–14 Eredivisie winners
(Poland) Sanok	2013–14 Polska Liga Hokejowa winners
(Romania) Corona 2010 Braşov	2013–14 Romanian Hockey League winners
(Hungary) Dunaújvárosi Acélbikák	2013–14 OB I bajnokság winners
(Latvia) Prizma Riga	2013–14 Latvian Hockey League winners
Enter in the first round
(Bulgaria) CSKA Sofia	2013–14 Bulgarian Hockey League winners
(Spain) Puigcerdà	2013–14 Liga Nacional de Hockey Hielo runners-up
(Serbia) Beostar	2013–14 Serbian Hockey League runners-up
(Turkey) Izmir BB GSK	2013–14 Turkish Ice Hockey Super League winners

- ^{a} Kompanion-Naftogaz withdrew its participation and was replaced by the Belfast Giants as the second-ranked team of the second round with the best record.

== First group stage ==
First round games was played on 26–28 September 2014.

=== Group A ===
(Sofia, Bulgaria)

Team #1	Score	Team #2
Beostar (Serbia)	20:2	(Turkey) Izmir BB GSK
CSKA Sofia (Bulgaria)	3:2	(Spain) Puigcerdà
Puigcerdà (Spain)	5:1	(Serbia) Beostar
Izmir BB GSK (Turkey)	3:19	(Bulgaria) CSKA Sofia
Izmir BB GSK (Turkey)	1:20	(Spain) Puigcerdà
CSKA Sofia (Bulgaria)	10:2	(Serbia) Beostar

=== Group A standings ===
Rank	Team	Points
1	(Bulgaria) CSKA Sofia	9
2	(Spain) Puigcerdà	6
3	(Serbia) Beostar	3
4	(Turkey) Izmir BB GSK	0

- Winner CSKA Sofia promoted for next round Group B.

== Second group stage ==
Second round games was played on 17–19 October 2014.

=== Group B ===
(Bremerhaven, Germany)

Team #1	Score	Team #2
Tilburg Trappers (Netherlands)	1:4	(United Kingdom) Belfast Giants
CSKA Sofia (Bulgaria)	2:6	(Germany) Fischtown Pinguins
Belfast Giants (United Kingdom)	6:2	(Bulgaria) CSKA Sofia
Fischtown Pinguins (Germany)	4:0	(Netherlands) Tilburg Trappers
CSKA Sofia (Bulgaria)	4:5	(Netherlands) Tilburg Trappers
Belfast Giants (United Kingdom)	2:4	(Germany) Fischtown Pinguins

=== Group B standings ===
Rank	Team	Points
1	(Germany) Fischtown Pinguins	9
2	(United Kingdom) Belfast Giants	6
3	(Netherlands) Tilburg Trappers	3
4	(Bulgaria) CSKA Sofia	0

- Winner Fischtown Pinguins promoted for next round Group D.
- Due to the withdrawal of the Kompanion-Naftogaz, Belfast Giants as the higher ranked second placed team from the second round advances to the next round Group E.

=== Group C ===
(Brașov, Romania)

Team #1	Score	Team #2
Dunaújvárosi Acélbikák (Hungary)	2:6	(Poland) Sanok
Corona 2010 Braşov (Romania)	3:2	(Latvia) Prizma Riga
Sanok (Poland)	2:3	(Latvia) Prizma Riga
Dunaújvárosi Acélbikák (Hungary)	2:3	(Romania) Corona 2010 Braşov
Prizma Riga (Latvia)	2:5	(Hungary) Dunaújvárosi Acélbikák
Corona 2010 Braşov (Romania)	3:4	(Poland) Sanok

=== Group C standings ===
Rank	Team	Points
1	(Poland) Sanok	6
2	(Romania) Corona 2010 Braşov	6
3	(Hungary) Dunaújvárosi Acélbikák	3
4	(Latvia) Prizma Riga	3

- Winner Sanok promoted for next round Group E.

== Third group stage ==
Third round games was played on 21–23 November 2014. The top-two ranked teams of each third round group promoted for the Super final.

=== Group D ===
(Ritten, Italy)

Team #1	Score	Team #2
Yertis Pavlodar (Kazakhstan)	3:2	(Germany) Fischtown Pinguins
Ritten Sport (Italy)	5:1	(Denmark) Herning Blue Fox
Herning Blue Fox (Denmark)	1:4	(Kazakhstan) Yertis Pavlodar
Fischtown Pinguins (Germany)	2:1 (SO)	(Italy) Ritten Sport
Ritten Sport (Italy)	0:4	(Kazakhstan) Yertis Pavlodar
Fischtown Pinguins (Germany)	2:1	(Denmark) Herning Blue Fox

=== Group D standings ===
Rank	Team	Points
1	(Kazakhstan) Yertis Pavlodar	9
2	(Germany) Fischtown Pinguins	5
3	(Italy) Ritten Sport	4
4	(Denmark) Herning Blue Fox	0

- Yertis Pavlodar and Fischtown Pinguins promoted for the final round.

=== Group E ===
(Angers, France)

Team #1	Score	Team #2
Belfast Giants (United Kingdom)	1:0	(Belarus) Neman Grodno
Sanok (Poland)	0:4	(France) Ducs d'Angers
Neman Grodno (Belarus)	2:0	(Poland) Sanok
Ducs d'Angers (France)	2:1	(United Kingdom) Belfast Giants
Sanok (Poland)	3:5	(United Kingdom) Belfast Giants
Ducs d'Angers (France)	3:4	(Belarus) Neman Grodno

- Kompanion-Naftogaz withdrew its participation and was replaced by the Belfast Giants as the second ranked team of the second round with the best record.

=== Group E standings ===
Rank	Team	Points
1	(France) Ducs d'Angers	6
2	(Belarus) Neman Grodno	6
3	(United Kingdom) Belfast Giants	6
4	(Poland) Sanok	0

- Ducs d'Angers and Neman Grodno promoted for the final round.

== Super final ==
Super final was played on 9–11 January 2015.

=== Final group ===
(Bremerhaven, Germany)

Team #1	Score	Team #2
Ducs d'Angers (France)	0:5	(Belarus) Neman Grodno
Fischtown Pinguins (Germany)	5:4	(Kazakhstan) Yertis Pavlodar
Yertis Pavlodar (Kazakhstan)	2:4	(France) Ducs d'Angers
Neman Grodno (Belarus)	6:2	(Germany) Fischtown Pinguins
Yertis Pavlodar (Kazakhstan)	3:4 (SO)	(Belarus) Neman Grodno
Fischtown Pinguins (Germany)	3:2 (SO)	(France) Ducs d'Angers

=== Final standings ===
Rank	Team	Points
1	(Belarus) Neman Grodno	8
2	(Germany) Fischtown Pinguins	5
3	(France) Ducs d'Angers	4
4	(Kazakhstan) Yertis Pavlodar	1

- Neman Grodno wins the 2015 IIHF Continental Cup to become the qualifier for next season's Champions Hockey League.
