= 2007–08 Panonian League season =

2007–2008 Panonian League Season
- League: Panonian League
- Sport: Ice hockey
- Regular-season winner: (Croatia) KHL Zagreb
- Champions: (Croatia) KHL Zagreb
- Runners-up: (Serbia) HK Partizan

Panonian League seasons
- ← 2003–2004 2008–2009 →

The 2007–2008 Panonian League Season was the third season of the league. The previous season ended in 2004, and the league was abandoned for some years. Unlike in the past, the teams came from only two countries - Croatia and Serbia. The season lasted from October 12, 2007 to February 15, 2008. There were no playoffs.

== Teams ==
- (Croatia) KHL Mladost
- (Croatia) KHL Zagreb
- (Serbia) HK Beostar
- (Serbia) HK Novi Sad
- (Serbia) HK Partizan
- (Serbia) HK Vojvodina
- (Serbia) KHK Crvena Zvezda

== Final standings ==
Rk	Team	GP	W	OTW	OTL	L	GF	GA	Pts
1.	(Croatia) KHL Mladost	12	9	2	0	1	71	40	31
2.	(Serbia) HK Partizan	12	8	1	0	3	58	35	26
3.	(Serbia) HK Novi Sad	12	6	1	1	4	50	38	21
4.	(Serbia) HK Vojvodina	12	5	0	3	4	44	38	18
5.	(Serbia) KHK Crvena Zvezda	12	3	2	0	7	39	53	13
6.	(Croatia) KHL Zagreb	12	3	1	0	8	34	69	11
7.	(Serbia) HK Beostar	12	1	0	3	8	30	55	6

== Scoring Leaders ==
Name	Team	Goals	Assists	Total points
(Ukraine) Dmitri Gnitko	Partizan	8	17	25
(Slovenia) Denis Kadić	Mladost	15	8	23
(Croatia) Igor Jacmenjak	Mladost	11	10	21
(Slovakia) Miroslav Hantak	Novi Sad	8	10	18
(Croatia) Mario Novak	Mladost	7	11	18
(Serbia) Marko Milovanović	Partizan	10	7	17
(Croatia) Tomislav Cunko	Mladost	7	9	16
(Canada) Kyle Zettler	Crvena Zvezda	7	9	16
(Canada) Marc-André Fournier	Vojvodina	9	6	15
(Croatia) Tomislav Grozaj	Mladost	8	6	14

== Games ==
=== Preseason ===
- 22/09/2007 Mladost - Crvena Zvezda 3-6 (0-1,0-2,3-3)
- 23/09/2007 Zagreb - Crvena Zvezda 1-3 (0-1,1-0,0-2)
- 02/10/2007 Beostar - Novi Sad 0-4 (0-2,0-1,0-1)
- 05/10/2007 Beostar - Novi Sad 2-5

=== Regular season ===
- Wednesday Oct. 10, 2007 Mladost - Partizan 6-3 (1-2,5-1,0-0)
- Friday Oct. 12, 2007 Crvena Zvezda - Zagreb 12-0 (4-0,2-0,6-0)
- Friday Oct. 12, 2007 Beostar - Vojvodina 4-1 (3-0,1-0,0-1)
- Tuesday Oct. 16, 2007 Zagreb - Beostar 6-3 (3-1,3-1,0-1)
- Friday, Oct. 19, 2007 Crvena Zvezda - Novi Sad 4-6 (3-0,1-2,0-4)
- Friday, Oct. 19, 2007 Vojvodina - Partizan 2-3 OT (0-0,2-0,0-2,0-1)
- Tuesday, Oct. 23, 2007 Mladost - Vojvodina 5-4 OT (2-1,2-1,0-2,1-0)
- Friday, Oct. 26, 2007 Partizan - Zagreb 3-5 (1-1,2-1,0-3)
- Friday, Oct. 26, 2007 Beostar - Novi Sad 1-6 (0-1,1-3,0-2)
- Tuesday, Oct. 30, 2007 Zagreb - Mladost 3-7 (0-1,3-4,0-2)
- Friday, Nov. 2, 2007 Novi Sad - Partizan 0-3 (0-1,0-0,0-2)
- Tuesday, Nov. 13, 2007 Mladost - Novi Sad 5-4 (1-1,1-1,3-2)
- Friday, Nov. 16, 2007 Partizan - Crvena Zvezda 10-2 (5-1,3-0,2-1)
- Friday, Nov. 16, 2007 Vojvodina - Zagreb 2-3 (0-0,2-0,0-3)
- Friday, Nov. 23, 2007 Crvena Zvezda - Mladost 1-5 (0-1,0-3,1-1)
- Friday, Nov. 23, 2007 Beostar - Partizan 3-6 (0-3,1-2,2-1)
- Friday, Nov. 23, 2007 Novi Sad - Vojvodina 5-3
- Tuesday, Nov. 27, 2007 Mladost - Beostar 8-3 (4-0,2-1,2-2)
- Friday, Nov. 30, 2007 Crvena Zvezda - Vojvodina 2-5
- Saturday, Dec. 8, 2007 Crvena Zvezda - Beostar 4-3 t.a.b. (1-1,2-2,0-0,0-0,1-0)
- Friday, Dec. 14, 2007 Partizan - Novi Sad 7-6 (2-2,5-2,0-2)
- Friday, Dec. 14, 2007 Beostar - Crvena Zvezda 2-3 t.a.b. (1-2,1-0,0-0,0-0,0-1)
- Friday, Dec. 21, 2007 Partizan - Mladost 4-1 (0-0,0-1,4-0)
- Friday, Dec. 21, 2007 Zagreb - Crvena Zvezda 1-2 (0-2,1-0,0-0)
- Friday, Dec. 21, 2007 Vojvodina - Beostar 2-1
- Sunday, Dec. 23, 2007 Mladost - Zagreb 12-5 (4-1,3-1,5-3)
- Friday, Jan. 4, 2008 Beostar - Zagreb 2-3 OT (1-0,0-0,1-2,0-1)
- Friday, Jan. 4, 2008 Novi Sad - Crvena Zvezda 2-4 (2-2,0-2,0-0)
- Friday, Jan. 11, 2008 Vojvodina - Mladost 1-4 (1-0,0-2,0-2)
- Friday, Feb. 1, 2008 Crvena Zvezda - Partizan 4-5 (1-2,0-1,3-2)
- Friday, Feb. 1, 2008 Novi Sad - Mladost 4-5 OT (1-1,1-1,2-2,0-1)
- Sunday, Feb. 3, 2008 Zagreb - Vojvodina 5-10 (2-2,2-6,1-2)
- Tuesday, Feb. 5, 2008 Mladost - Crvena Zvezda 6-3 (1-1,3-0,2-2)
- Tuesday, Feb. 5, 2008 Partizan - Beostar 5-1 (2-0,0-1,3-0)
- Tuesday, Feb. 5, 2008 Vojvodina - Novi Sad 2-3 OT (0-1,0-1,2-0,0-1)
- Friday, Feb. 15, 2008 Beostar - Mladost 5-7 (1-3,2-3,2-1)
- Friday, Feb. 15, 2008 Crvena Zvezda - Vojvodina 0-8 (0-1,0-4,0-3)
- Friday, Feb. 15, 2008 Zagreb - Partizan 1-6 (1-3,0-2,0-1)
- Friday, Feb. 15, 2008 Novi Sad - Zagreb 5-0 by forfeit
- Sunday, Feb. 17, 2008 Partizan - Vojvodina 3-4 (1-1,0-1,2-2)
- Tuesday, Feb. 19, 2008 Zagreb - Novi Sad 2-5
- Friday, Feb. 29, 2008 Novi Sad - Beostar 4-2
