= 2000–01 Serbian Hockey League season =

2000-2001 Serbian Hockey League Season
- League: Serbian Hockey League
- Sport: Ice hockey
- Regular-season winner: (Federal Republic of Yugoslavia) HK Vojvodina
- Champions: (Federal Republic of Yugoslavia) HK Vojvodina
- Runners-up: (Federal Republic of Yugoslavia) HK Partizan

Serbian Hockey League seasons
- ← 1999-00 2001-02 →

The Serbian Hockey League Season for 2000-2001 was the tenth season of the league. Unlike in the previous season, teams from Belgrade participated. However, the dominance established by HK Vojvodina in their absence was maintained, as the club won its fourth title in a row.

== Teams ==
- HK Vojvodina
- HK Spartak Subotica
- HK Novi Sad
- HK Partizan
- HK Taš

== Regular season standings ==
Rk	Team	GP	W	T	L	GF	GA	Pts
1.	HK Vojvodina	16	16	0	0	232	8	32
2.	HK Partizan	16	12	0	4	102	63	24
3.	HK Taš	16	6	0	10	62	117	12
4.	HK Spartak	16	4	0	12	49	150	8
5.	HK Novi Sad	16	2	0	12	21	128	4

== Playoffs ==
In the finals HK Vojvodina beat HK Partizan.

- Game 1 - HK Vojvodina vs HK Partizan 7-2
- Game 2 - HK Vojvodina vs HK Partizan 11-3
