= 2008–09 Serbian Hockey League season =

2008-2009 Serbian Hockey League Season
- League: Serbian Hockey League
- Sport: Ice hockey
- Teams: 5
- Regular-season winner: (Serbia) HK Partizan
- Champions: (Serbia) HK Partizan
- Runners-up: (Serbia) HK Vojvodina

Serbian Hockey League seasons
- ← 2007-08 2009-10 →

The Serbian Hockey League Season for 2008-2009 consisted of 16 games. HK Partizan won the regular division and the playoffs, making it their 4th title in a row.

== Final standings ==
Rk	Team	GP	W	OTW	OTL	L	GF	GA	Pts
1.	HK Partizan	16	13	2	0	1	102	30	43
2.	HK Vojvodina	16	8	1	0	7	84	65	26
3.	HK Novi Sad	16	6	2	2	5	77	65	24
4.	KHK Crvena Zvezda	16	7	0	3	5	55	52	23
5.	HK Beostar	16	1	0	0	15	26	129	3

== Playoffs ==
=== Semifinals ===
HK Vojvodina vs HK Novi Sad

- Game 1 - HK Vojvodina - HK Novi Sad 7-4 (1-0, 4–2, 2-2)
- Game 2 - HK Novi Sad - HK Vojvodina 4-0 (1-0, 2–0, 1–0)
- Game 3 - HK Vojvodina - HK Novi Sad 9-1 (4-0, 2–1, 3–0)
- Vojvodina wins 2-1

HK Partizan vs Crvena Zvezda

- Zvezda forfeits, Partizan wins 2-0

=== Finals ===
- Game 1 - HK Partizan - HK Vojvodina 3-6 (0-1, 1–2, 2–3)
- Game 2 - HK Vojvodina - HK Partizan 0-4 (0-0, 0–2, 0–2)
- Game 3 - HK Partizan - HK Vojvodina 3-2 SO (0-1, 1-1, 1–0, 0-0, 1–0)
- HK Partizan wins the series 2:1
