= 2008–09 Panonian League season =

2008–2009 Panonian League Season
- League: Panonian League
- Sport: Ice hockey
- Regular-season winner: (Serbia) HK Partizan
- Champions: (Serbia) HK Vojvodina
- Runners-up: (Serbia) HK Partizan

Panonian League seasons
- 2007–2008 None

The 2008–2009 Panonian League Season was the fourth and final season of the league. Like in the previous season, the teams came from only two countries - Croatia and Serbia. The same teams participated, and there were playoffs. The season started earlier, on September 30, and lasted until February 15, 2008.

HK Vojvodina won the league playoffs. This was the first time a Serbian team won this cross-border league. In the finals, HK Vojvodina beat HK Partizan. The two teams would also reach the finals for the Serbian championship one month later.

== Teams ==
- (Croatia) KHL Mladost
- (Croatia) KHL Zagreb
- (Serbia) HK Beostar
- (Serbia) HK Novi Sad
- (Serbia) HK Partizan
- (Serbia) HK Vojvodina
- (Serbia) KHK Crvena Zvezda

== Final standings ==
Rk	Team	GP	W	OTW	OTL	L	GF	GA	Pts
1.	(Serbia) HK Partizan	12	9	1	1	1	60	22	30
2.	(Serbia) KHK Crvena Zvezda	12	7	0	1	4	47	30	22
3.	(Serbia) HK Vojvodina	12	7	0	0	5	46	43	21
4.	(Serbia) HK Novi Sad	12	5	1	0	6	48	46	17
5.	(Croatia) KHL Mladost	12	5	1	0	6	52	50	17
6.	(Croatia) KHL Zagreb	12	4	1	1	6	38	47	15
7.	(Serbia) HK Beostar	12	1	0	1	10	16	69	4

== Playoffs ==
=== Semifinals ===
The semifinals were held on February 6 & February 9, 2009.

- HK Partizan swept HK Novi Sad 2-0. Game 1 was forfeited by HK Novi Sad.
  - Game 1 - Partizan - Novi Sad 5-0 (forfeit)
  - Game 2 - Novi Sad - Partizan 6-11 (2-3,3-3,1-5)
- HK Vojvodina swept HK Crvena Zvezda in a best of three series.
  - Game 1 - Crvena Zvezda - Vojvodina 4-5 (2-2,0-2,2-1)
  - Game 2 - Vojvodina - Crvena Zvezda 4-1 (1-0,1-0,2-1)

=== Finals ===
The finals were scheduled for 13, 16, 19, 22 and 25 February 2009.

- HK Vojvodina beat HK Partizan in a best of five series.
  - Game 1 - Partizan - Vojvodina 4-5 (1-3,1-0,2-2)
  - Game 2 - Vojvodina - Partizan 6-2 (1-1,2-1,3-0)
  - Game 3 - Partizan - Vojvodina 4-2 (2-0,0-2,2-0)
  - Game 4 - Vojvodina - Partizan 2-1 (1-0,1-0,0-1)

=== Third Place ===
The third place competition was held on February 13 & February 16, 2009.

- HK Crvena Zvezda swept HK Novi Sad in a best of three series.
  - Game 1 - Crvena Zvezda - Novi Sad 8-3 (1-0,4-0,3-3)
  - Game 2 - Novi Sad - Crvena Zvezda 0-4 (0-0,0-3,0-1)

== Scoring Leaders ==
Name	Team	Goals	Assists	Total points
(Canada) Andrew Decristoforo	Crvena Zvezda	18	23	41
(Russia) Pavel Popravko	Novi Sad	8	17	23
(Canada) Marc-André Fournier	Vojvodina	15	8	17
(Czech Republic) Bohuslav Subr	Partizan	11	10	17
(Canada) / (Serbia) Daniel Jacob	Vojvodina	7	11	14
(Serbia) Boris Gabric	Partizan	10	7	13
(Serbia) Jovan Matic	Crvena Zvezda	7	11	13
(Canada) Chris Churchill-Smith	Vojvodina	10	7	12
(Canada) Ricky Walton	Novi Sad	7	9	12
(Canada) Justin Rohr	Vojvodina	7	9	12

== Games ==
=== Regular season ===
- 30/09/2008 Partizan - Zagreb 2-3 t.a.b. (1-0,0-1,1-1,0-0,0-1)
- 06/10/2008 Mladost - Partizan 1-6 (1-4,0-2,0-0)
- 07/10/2008 Crvena Zvezda - Zagreb 6-3 (1-1,4-0,1-2)
- 13/10/2008 Mladost - Novi Sad 8-4 (1-1,5-1,2-2)
- 14/10/2008 Vojvodina - Zagreb 6-1 (1-1,4-0,1-0)
- 24/10/2008 Zagreb - Mladost 3-9 (1-2,1-5,1-2)
- 28/10/2008 Crvena Zvezda - Mladost 5-0 by forfeit
- 11/11/2008 Novi Sad - Crvena Zvezda 1-0 t.a.b. (0-0,0-0,1-0)*
- 11/11/2008 Beostar - Vojvodina 1-6 (0-0,0-2,1-4)
- 14/11/2008 Crvena Zvezda - Beostar 4-2 (2-0,1-2,1-0)
- 14/11/2008 Vojvodina - Partizan 2-3 (2-1,0-1,0-1)
- 17/11/2008 Mladost - Beostar 5-4 t.a.b. (1-3,0-1,3-0,0-0,1-0)
- 18/11/2008 Novi Sad - Partizan 1-6 (1-2,0-2,0-2)
- 18/11/2008 Crvena Zvezda - Vojvodina 7-1 (2-1,2-0,3-0)
- 21/11/2008 Novi Sad - Zagreb 7-4 (2-2,2-1,3-1)
- 22/11/2008 Beostar - Zagreb 1-3 (0-1,0-1,1-1)
- 22/11/2008 Partizan - Crvena Zvezda 3-0 (0-0,2-0,1-0)
- 25/11/2008 Zagreb - Crvena Zvezda 1-0 (0-0,0-0,1-0)
- 25/11/2008 Beostar - Novi Sad 3-1 (2-1,0-0,1-0)
- 28/11/2008 Partizan - Beostar 8-4 (3-0,2-3,3-1)
- 28/11/2008 Vojvodina - Novi Sad 6-2 (1-1,4-1,1-0)
- 01/12/2008 Vojvodina - Mladost 6-3 (2-2,2-0,2-1)
- 02/12/2008 Zagreb - Partizan 3-4 t.a.b. (0-1,3-2,0-0,0-0,0-1)
- 02/12/2008 Crvena Zvezda - Novi Sad 8-6 (5-1,3-4,0-1)
- 05/12/2008 Partizan - Vojvodina 6-3 (1-1,5-1,0-1)
- 05/12/2008 Beostar - Crvena Zvezda 0-6 (0-0,0-2,0-4)
- 09/12/2008 Crvena Zvezda - Partizan 1-5 (0-1,1-3,0-1)
- 09/12/2008 Novi Sad - Beostar 9-0 (5-0,3-0,1-0)
- 12/12/2008 Vojvodina - Beostar 2-1 (0-0,1-0,1-1)
- 21/12/2008 Partizan - Mladost 15-3 (6-1,5-1,4-1)
- 22/12/2008 Beostar - Mladost 0-8 (0-2,0-3,0-3)
- 10/01/2009 Vojvodina - Crvena Zvezda 5-4 (1-2,2-1,2-1)
- 10/01/2009 Beostar - Partizan 0-12 (0-4,0-3,0-5)
- 12/01/2009 Mladost - Crvena Zvezda 3-7 (0-2,1-3,2-2)
- 13/01/2009 Novi Sad - Vojvodina 5-3 (3-1,0-1,2-1)
- 19/01/2009 Mladost - Zagreb 5-4 (2-1,2-1,1-2)
- 20/01/2009 Zagreb - Novi Sad 3-7 (1-2,1-3,1-2)
- 24/01/2009 Partizan - Novi Sad 5-0 by forfeit
- 24/01/2009 Mladost - Vojvodina 5-6 (1-2,3-3,1-1)
- Zagreb - Beostar 5-0 by forfeit
- Novi Sad - Mladost 5-0 by forfeit
- Zagreb - Vojvodina 5-0 by forfeit
