= 2012–13 Serbian Hockey League season =

Serbian ice hockey season

The 2012–13 Serbian Hockey League season was the 22nd season of the Serbian Hockey League, the top level of ice hockey in Serbia. Six teams participated in the league, and HK Partizan won the championship.

== Regular season ==
	Club	GP	W	OTW	OTL	L	Goals	Pts
1.	HK Partizan	8	8	0	0	0	75:33	24
2.	HK Vitez	10	7	0	1	2	47:36	22
3.	HK Spartak Subotica	8	2	2	1	3	37:38	11
4.	HK Crvena Zvezda	10	2	1	0	7	28:55	8
5.	HK NS Stars	8	2	0	1	5	29:46	7
6.	Serbia U20	8	2	0	0	6	29:37	6
