= 1994–95 Serbian Hockey League season =

1994-1995 Serbian Hockey League Season
- League: Serbian Hockey League
- Sport: Ice hockey
- Regular-season winner: (Federal Republic of Yugoslavia) HK Partizan
- Champions: (Federal Republic of Yugoslavia) HK Partizan
- Runners-up: (Federal Republic of Yugoslavia) KHK Crvena Zvezda

Serbian Hockey League seasons
- ← 1993-94 1995-96 →

The Serbian Hockey League Season for 1994-1995 was the fourth season of the league. This was the first season in which HK Vojvodina participated in, since the end of the former Yugoslavia. Four teams participated, each one playing four games with one another, resulting in twelve games for each team. HK Partizan won all the games that it played that season, resulting in them winning the regular division. They went on to win the playoffs. It was their second title since the end of the former Yugoslavia.

== Teams ==
- HK Partizan
- KHK Crvena Zvezda
- HK Vojvodina
- HK Spartak Subotica

== Regular season standings ==
Rk	Team	GP	W	T	L	GF	GA	Pts
1.	HK Partizan	12	12	0	0	117	18	24
2.	HK Vojvodina	12	6	0	6	72	65	12
3.	KHK Crvena Zvezda	12	5	0	7	72	54	10
4.	HK Spartak	12	1	0	11	31	161	2

== Playoffs ==
=== Semifinals ===
Partizan defeated Spartak in a best of three series. Spartak could not participate after the first game, so Partizan won by default.

- Partizan-Spartak 22:2
- Partizan-Spartak 5:0 (forfeit)
- Partizan-Spartak 5:0 (forfeit)

Crvena Zvezda defeated Vojvodina in a best of three series, winning 9-1 and 9-3.

=== Finals ===
Partizan swept the finals.

- Partizan-Crvena Zvezda 10:1
- Partizan-Crvena Zvezda 5:1
- Partizan-Crvena Zvezda 9:3

=== third place ===
Vojvodina ate Spartak... 15-3 14-2 22-3

== cup competition ==
There was also the competition for the cup.

=== semi-finals ===
- Partizan beat Vojvodina 12-3
- Spartak lost to Red Star 5-7

=== cup finals ===
Partizan - Red Star 6-3

== Games ==
The list is incomplete, including only one third of the games played.

- Partizan-Vojvodina 3:2
- Partizan-Crvena Zvezda 9:2
- Partizan Spartak 26:1
- Partizan-Vojvodina 10:4
- Partizan-Crvena Zvezda 4:0
- Partizan Spartak 11:2
- Partizan-Vojvodina 8:1
- Partizan-Crvena Zvezda 4:0
- Partizan Spartak 17:1
- Partizan-Vojvodina 12:4
- Partizan-Crvena Zvezda 4:0
- Partizan Spartak 13:1
