= 2004–05 Serbian Hockey League season =

2004-2005 Serbian Hockey League Season
- League: Serbian Hockey League
- Sport: Ice hockey
- Regular-season winner: (Serbia and Montenegro) HK Vojvodina
- Champions: (Serbia and Montenegro) KHK Crvena Zvezda
- Runners-up: (Serbia and Montenegro) HK Vojvodina

Serbian Hockey League seasons
- ← 2003-04 2005-06 →

The Serbian Hockey League Season for 2005-2006 was held. It started on October 14. In the end KHK Crvena Zvezda won, ending the dominance of HK Vojvodina.

== Teams ==
- HK Vojvodina
- KHK Crvena Zvezda
- HK Novi Sad
- HK Partizan
- HK Subotica

== Final standings ==
Rk	Team	GP	W	T	L	GF	GA	Pts
1.	HK Vojvodina	13	10	1	2	99	37	21
2.	KHK Crvena Zvezda	13	9	1	3	92	35	19
3.	HK Novi Sad	11	7	0	4	69	49	14
4.	HK Partizan	10	2	0	8	48	72	4
5.	HK Subotica	10	0	0	10	17	132	0

== Playoffs ==
=== semifinals ===
- Vojvodina defeated Partizan
- Crvena Zvezda defeated Novi Sad

=== finals ===
- Crvena Zvezda defeated Vojvodina

=== third place ===
- Novi Sad defeated Partizan

== Schedule and results ==
- 14.10.04 Beograd HK Crvena Zvezda Beograd vs HK Novi Sad 10:0
- 22.10.04 Beograd HK Crvena Zvezda Beograd vs HK Vojvodina Novi Sad 5:7
- 25.10.04 Beograd HK Partizan Beograd vs HK Crvena Zvezda Beograd 3:6
- 28.10.04 Beograd HK Partizan Beograd vs HK Novi Sad 2:6
- 02.11.04 Beograd HK Partizan Beograd vs HK Vojvodina Novi Sad 4:14
- 02.11.04 Novi Sad HK Vojvodina Novi Sad vs HK Novi Sad 6:3
- 19.11.04 Beograd HK Partizan Beograd vs HK Vojvodina Novi Sad 3:7
- 19.11.04 Novi Sad HK Novi Sad vs HK Crvena Zvezda Beograd 3:1
- 23.11.04 Beograd HK Crvena Zvezda Beograd vs HK Vojvodina Novi Sad 2:0
- 23.11.04 Subotica HK Spartak Subotica vs HK Partizan Beograd 3:8
- 25.11.04 Beograd HK Crvena Zvezda Beograd vs HK Partizan Beograd 7:4
- 26.11.04 Subotica HK Spartak Subotica vs HK Novi Sad 1:8
- 03.12.04 Subotica HK Spartak Subotica vs HK Vojvodina Novi Sad 1:8
- 03.12.04 Novi Sad HK Novi Sad vs HK Partizan Beograd 8:4
- 07.12.04 Subotica HK Spartak Subotica HK Crvena Zvezda Beograd 1:16
- 07.12.04 Novi Sad HK Vojvodina Novi Sad vs HK Novi Sad 6:5
- 10.12.04 Beograd HK Crvena Zvezda Beograd vs HK Vojvodina Novi Sad 4:4
- 14.12.04 Beograd HK Crvena Zvezda Beograd vs HK Vojvodina Novi Sad 3:2
- 14.12.04 Beograd HK Partizan Beograd vs HK Spartak Subotica 10:1
- 16.12.04 Beograd HK Crvena Zvezda Beograd vs HK Partizan Beograd 13:5
- 17.12.04 Novi Sad HK Novi Sad vs HK Spartak Subotica 8:1
- 09.01.05 Subotica HK Spartak Subotica vs HK Crvena Zvezda Beograd 1:23
- 14.01.05 Beograd HK Partizan Beograd vs HK Novi Sad 5:7
- 18.01.05 Novi Sad HK Vojvodina Novi Sad vs HK Novi Sad 8:2
- 21.01.05 Novi Sad HK Novi Sad vs HK Crvena Zvezda Beograd 0:2
- 21.01.05 Beograd HK Partizan Beograd vs HK Vojvodina Novi Sad missing
- 25.01.05 Subotica HK Vojvodina Novi Sad vs HK Spartak Subotica 19:1
- 28.01.05 Novi Sad HK Vojvodina Novi Sad vs HK Crvena Zvezda Beograd 5:0
- 01.02.05 Beograd HK Crvena Zvezda Beograd vs HK Partizan Beograd missing
- 01.02.05 Subotica HK Spartak Subotica vs HK Novi Sad 3:19
- 04.02.05 Subotica HK Spartak Subotica vs HK Vojvodina Novi Sad 4:13
- 04.02.05 Novi Sad HK Novi Sad vs HK Partizan Beograd missing
