= 2013–14 Serbian Hockey League season =

Serbian ice hockey season

The 2013–14 Serbian Hockey League season was the 23rd season of the Serbian Hockey League, the top level of ice hockey in Serbia. Seven teams participated in the league, and HK Partizan won the championship.

== Regular season ==
	Club	GP	W	OTW	OTL	L	Goals	Pts
1.	HK Partizan	10	9	0	0	1	84:30	27
2.	HK Beostar	11	7	1	1	2	69:29	24
3.	Tisza Volan Szeged	11	5	2	0	4	66:57	19
4.	HK Vitez	9	4	0	1	4	39:45	13
5.	HK Spartak Subotica	6	2	0	1	3	20:27	7
6.	Serbia U20	9	1	0	0	8	22:71	3
7.	HK NS Stars	6	0	0	0	6	12:53	0
