= 2003–04 Serbian Hockey League season =

Serbian ice hockey season

The 2003-04 Serbian Hockey League season was the 13th season of the Serbian Hockey League, the top level of ice hockey in Serbia. Five teams participated in the league, and HK Vojvodina Novi Sad won the championship.

== Playoffs ==
=== Semifinals ===
- Vojvodina 18 Partizan 1
- Crvena zvezda 6 HK Novi Sad 4

=== Final ===
- Vojvodina 6 Crvena zvezda 1

=== 3rd place ===
- Novi Sad 9 Partizan 8
