= 1993–94 Serbian Hockey League season =

1993-1994 Serbian Hockey League Season
- League: Serbian Hockey League
- Sport: Ice hockey
- Regular-season winner: (Federal Republic of Yugoslavia) HK Partizan
- Champions: (Federal Republic of Yugoslavia) HK Partizan
- Runners-up: (Federal Republic of Yugoslavia) KHK Crvena Zvezda

Serbian Hockey League seasons
- ← 1992-93 1994-95 →

The 1993–94 season was the third season of the Serbian Hockey League. Only three teams participated, each one playing four games with one another, resulting in 8 games for each team. HK Partizan won all the games that it played that season, resulting in them winning the regular division and the playoffs. It was their first title since the end of the former Yugoslavia.

== Teams ==
- HK Partizan
- KHK Crvena Zvezda
- HK Spartak Subotica

== Final standings ==
Rk	Team	GP	W	T	L	GF	GA	Pts
1.	HK Partizan	8	8	0	0	80	9	16
2.	KHK Crvena Zvezda	8	4	0	4	47	33	8
3.	HK Spartak	8	0	0	5	19	90	0

== Games ==
The list is incomplete, including only half the games played.

- Partizan-Crvena Zvezda 7–3
- Partizan-Spartak 17–4
- Partizan-Crvena Zvezda 6–2
- Partizan-Spartak 18–2
- Partizan-Crvena Zvezda 5–0
- Partizan-Spartak 22–1
- Partizan-Crvena Zvezda 9–4
- Partizan-Spartak 15–3

== Playoffs ==
=== Semifinals ===
Crvena Zvezda defeated Spartak

=== Finals ===
- Partizan-Crvena Zvezda 3–1
- Partizan-Crvena Zvezda 8–3
- Partizan-Crvena Zvezda 2–1
