= 1992–93 Serbian Hockey League season =

1992-1993 Serbian Hockey League Season
- League: Serbian Hockey League
- Sport: Ice hockey
- Regular-season winner: (Federal Republic of Yugoslavia) KHK Crvena Zvezda
- Champions: (Federal Republic of Yugoslavia) KHK Crvena Zvezda
- Runners-up: (Federal Republic of Yugoslavia) HK Spartak Subotica

Serbian Hockey League seasons
- ← 1991-92 1993-94 →

The Serbian Hockey League 1992-1993 season was the second season of the league. Four teams participated. KHK Crvena Zvezda won their second consecutive title.

== Teams ==
- HK Partizan
- KHK Crvena Zvezda
- HK Spartak Subotica
- HK Vojvodina

== Final standings ==
Rk	Team	GP	W	T	L	GF	GA	Pts
1.	KHK Crvena Zvezda	18	12	1	5	126	84	25
2.	HK Spartak	18	8	2	8	81	101	18
3.	HK Vojvodina	15	7	0	8	69	87	14
4.	HK Partizan	15	6	1	8	73	78	13

Vojvodina and Partizan played three games fewer than Crvena Zvezda and Spartak

== Playoffs ==
In the finals KHK Crvena Zvezda beat HK Spartak Subotica.
