= 1995–96 Serbian Hockey League season =

1995-1996 Serbian Hockey League Season
- League: Serbian Hockey League
- Sport: Ice hockey
- Regular-season winner: (Federal Republic of Yugoslavia) KHK Crvena Zvezda
- Champions: (Federal Republic of Yugoslavia) KHK Crvena Zvezda
- Runners-up: (Federal Republic of Yugoslavia) HK Vojvodina

Serbian Hockey League seasons
- ← 1994-95 1996-97 →

The Serbian Hockey League Season for 1995-1996 was the fifth season of the league. Four teams participated, each one playing four games with one another, resulting in twelve games for each team. KHK Crvenza Zvezda won each game that it played that season, resulting in them winning the regular division. They went on to win the playoffs.

== Teams ==
- HK Partizan
- KHK Crvena Zvezda
- HK Vojvodina
- HK Spartak Subotica

== Regular season standings ==
Rk	Team	GP	W	T	L	GF	GA	Pts
1.	KHK Crvena Zvezda	12	12	0	0	130	28	24
2.	HK Vojvodina	12	7	0	5	70	45	14
3.	HK Partizan	12	3	0	9	50	95	6
4.	HK Spartak	12	2	0	10	32	113	4

== Playoffs ==
=== Semifinals ===
- Crvena Zvezda defeated Spartak in a series. 13-1 5-0
- HK Vojvodina defeated Partizan in a series. 6-3 8-3

=== Finals ===
Red Star swept Vojvodina in the finals.

- Game 1 - 4-2
- Game 2 - 7-4
- Game 3 - 12-2

=== third place ===
Spartak and Partizan were supposed to pay in the finals. However they did not participate, and spartak won by default.

== Cup Competition ==
There was also the competition for the cup. In it, Red Star beat Vojvodina 9-3 to win it.
