= 2011–12 Serbian Hockey League season =

Serbian ice hockey season

The 2011–12 Serbian Hockey League season was the 21st season of the Serbian Hockey League, the top level of ice hockey in Serbia. HK Partizan won the championship by defeating HK Vitez in the final.

== Regular season ==
January 20, 2012	HK Vojvodina	4 – 6 (1–3, 2–2, 1–1)	Spartak Subotica

February 1, 2012	Spartak Subotica	9 – 5 (3–3, 4–1, 2–1)	HK Vitez

February 10, 2012	HK Vojvodina	Cancelled	HK Vitez

Both HK Vojvodina and Spartak Subotica were excluded from the championship, and HK Vitez advanced to play HK Partizan in a best-of-three league superfinal. Partizan had played the regular season in the multi-national Slohokej League.

== Superfinal ==
March 3, 2012	HK Partizan	10 – 1 (2–0, 4–0, 4–1)	HK Vitez

March 4, 2012	HK Vitez	0 – 7 (0–1, 0–3, 0–3)	HK Partizan
