= 2001–02 Serbian Hockey League season =

Serbian ice hockey season

The 2001-02 Serbian Hockey League season was the 11th season of the Serbian Hockey League, the top level of ice hockey in Serbia. Five teams participated in the league, and HK Vojvodina Novi Sad won the championship.

== Regular season ==
	Club	GP	W	T	L	GF–GA	Pts
1.	Vojvodina	16	16	0	0	187–28	32
2.	Crvena zvezda	16	12	0	4	146–65	24
3.	Partizan	16	7	0	9	82–90	14
4.	Spartak Subotica	16	3	1	12	45–147	7
5.	Novi Sad	16	1	1	14	37–167	3

== Playoffs ==
=== Semifinals ===
- Vojvodina 21 Spartak Subotica 0
- KHK Crvena zvezda 9 Partizan 5

=== Final ===
- Vojvodina – Crvena zvezda (9–3, 5–3)

=== 3rd place ===
- Partizan – Spartak Subotica (7–5, 7–7 (3–0 SH)
