= 2002–03 Serbian Hockey League season =

The 2002–03 Serbian Hockey League season was the 12th season of the Serbian Hockey League, the top level of ice hockey in Serbia. Five teams participated in the league, and HK Vojvodina Novi Sad won the championship.

== Regular season ==
	Club	GP	Pts
1.	Vojvodina	16	30
2.	Crvena zvezda	16	20
3.	Novi Sad	16	19
4.	Spartak Subotica	16	7
5.	Partizan	16	3

== Playoffs ==
=== Semifinals ===
- Novi Sad – Spartak Subotica (10–0, 5–1)
- Vojvodina – Crvena zvezda (10–4, 8–4)

=== Final ===
- Vojvodina – Novi Sad (12–5, 7–2)
