= 1998–99 Serbian Hockey League season =

1998-1999 Serbian Hockey League Season
- League: Serbian Hockey League
- Sport: Ice hockey
- Regular-season winner: (Federal Republic of Yugoslavia) HK Vojvodina
- Champions: (Federal Republic of Yugoslavia) HK Vojvodina
- Runners-up: (Federal Republic of Yugoslavia) HK Novi Sad

Serbian Hockey League seasons
- ← 1997-98 1999-00 →

The Serbian Hockey League Season for 1998-1999 was the eighth season of the league. Only three teams participated. The teams from Belgrade were out because the arena in Belgrade was out. HK Vojvodina was the winner, in what started a long dynasty of winning the league titles. This was also the first season that HK Novi Sad participated.

== Teams ==
- HK Vojvodina
- HK Spartak Subotica
- HK Novi Sad

== Regular season standings ==
Rk	Team	GP	W	T	L	Pts
1.	HK Vojvodina	8	7	1	0	15
2.	HK Novi Sad	8	2	1	5	5
3.	HK Spartak	8	1	0	7	2

== Playoffs ==
There were only the finals. HK Vojvodina beat HK Novi Sad in a best of two series.

- Game 1 - HK Vojvodina vs HK Novi Sad 3-4
- Game 2 - HK Vojvodina vs HK Novi Sad 7-2
