= 2007–08 Serbian Hockey League season =

2007-2008 Serbian Hockey League Season
- League: Serbian Hockey League
- Sport: Ice hockey
- Regular-season winner: (Serbia) HK Partizan
- Champions: (Serbia) HK Partizan
- Runners-up: (Serbia) HK Novi Sad

Serbian Hockey League seasons
- ← 2006-07 2008-09 →

The Serbian Hockey League Season for 2007-2008 consisted of 24 games. It started on October 12. HK Partizan won the regular division and the playoffs, making it their third title in a row.

== Final standings ==
Rk	Team	GP	W	OTW	OTL	L	GF	GA	Pts
1.	HK Partizan	24	16	2	1	5	103	64	53
2.	HK Novi Sad	24	13	3	1	7	102	77	46
3.	HK Vojvodina	24	19	1	4	9	73	69	36
4.	KHK Crvena Zvezda	24	7	4	0	12	74	90	29
5.	HK Beostar	24	4	0	4	16	45	97	16

== Playoffs ==
=== Semifinals ===
Partizan beat Zvezda 2-1
Novi Sad beat Vojvodina 2-1

- .03.2008. Partizan - C.Zvezda 4:5 PS
- 11.03.2008. C.Zvezda - Partizan 2:5
- 15.03.2008. Partizan - C.Zvezda 3:2
- 09.03.2008. Novi Sad - Vojvodina 5:6
- 11.03.2008. Vojvodina - Novi Sad 3:5
- 15.03.2008. Novi Sad - Vojvodina 3:1

=== Finals ===
Partizan won 3-0

- 18.03.2008 Partizan - Novi Sad 7 : 4
- 21.03.2008 Novi Sad - Partizan 3 : 4
- 25.03.2008 Partizan - Novi Sad 7 : 4

== 3rd place ==
Zvezda won 2-1

- 18.03.2008 Vojvodina - C.Zvezda 3 : 1
- 21.03.2008 C.Zvezda - Vojvodina 4 : 2
- 25.03.2008 Vojvodina - C.Zvezda 2 : 3 PS

== Schedule and results ==
- 12.10.07 Novi Beograd - HK Beostar vs HK Vojvodina 4:1 (3:0, 1:0, 0:1)
- 16.10.07 Beograd - HK Partizan vs HK Crvena Zvezda 4:3 (3:1, 0:1, 1:1)
- 16.10.07 Novi Sad - HK Vojvodina vs HK Novi Sad
- 19.10.07 Novi Sad - HK Vojvodina vs HK Partizan 2:3 (0:0,2:0,0:2), OT
- 19.10.07 Beograd - HK Crvena Zvezda vs HK Novi Sad 4:6
- 23.10.07 Novi Sad - HK Novi Sad vs HK Partizan 4:3 PS (0:3,2:0,1:0,0:0,1:0)
- 23.10.07 Beograd - HK Crvena Zvezda vs HK Beostar 5:3
- 26.10.07 Novi Beograd - HK Beostar vs HK Novi Sad 1:6 (0:1,1:3,0:2)
- 30.10.07 Novi Sad - HK Vojvodina vs HK Beostar 1:0 (0:0,1:0,0:0)
- 30.10.07 Beograd - HK Crvena Zvezda vs HK Novi Sad 3:6 (0:1,1:1,2:4)
- 02.11.07 Novi Sad - HK Novi Sad vs HK Partizan 0:3 (0:1, 0:0, 0:2)
- 02.11.07 Beograd - HK Crvena Zvezda vs HK Beostar
- 06.11.07 Novi Beograd - HK Beostar vs HK Novi Sad 4:7
- 06.11.07 Novi Sad - HK Vojvodina vs HK Partizan 2:5 (0:1,1:3,1:1)
- 09.11.07 Beograd - HK Crvena Zvezda vs HK Vojvodina 4:3 (1:1, 0:1, 3:1)
- 09.11.07 Novi Beograd - HK Beostar vs HK Partizan 1:5 (0:2, 0:3, 1:0)
- 16.11.07 Beograd - HK Partizan vs HK Crvena Zvezda 10:2 (5:1, 3:0,2:1)
- 20.11.07 Novi Beograd - HK Beostar vs HK Vojvodina 0:4
- 20.11.07 Novi Sad - HK Novi Sad vs HK Crvena Zvezda 3:5
- 23.11.07 Novi Sad - HK Novi Sad vs HK Vojvodina 5:3
- 23.11.07 Novi Beograd - HK Beostar vs HK Partizan 3:6 (0:3,1:2,2:1)
- 27.11.07 Beograd - HK Crvena Zvezda HK Partizan 1:4 (0:2, 0:1, 1:1)
- 27.11.07 Novi Sad - HK Novi Sad vs HK Vojvodina 4:3 SO (0:0,2:3,1:0,1:0)
- 30.11.07 Novi Sad - HK Vojvodina vs HK Crvena Zvezda 5:2
- 04.12.07 Novi Sad - HK Novi Sad vs HK Beostar 6:3
- 04.12.07 Beograd - HK Partizan vs HK Vojvodina 4:5 (1:2,2:1,1:2)
- 07.12.07 Beograd - HK Partizan vs HK Novi Sad 4:5 (1:3, 2:0, 1:2)
- 07.12.07 Novi Beograd - HK Beostar vs HK Crvena Zvezda 1:0 (1:0; 0:0; 0:0)
- 11.12.07 Novi Sad - HK Vojvodina vs HK Crvena Zvezda
- 11.12.07 Beograd - HK Partizan vs HK Beostar 7:1 (4:0, 2:1, 1:0)
- 14.12.07 Beograd - HK Partizan vs HK Novi Sad 7:6 (2:2, 5:2, 0:2)
- 14.12.07 Novi Beograd - HK Beostar vs HK Crvena Zvezda 2:3 (1:2; 1:0; 0:0; 0:0, 0:1) SO
- 18.12.07 Novi Sad - HK Vojvodina vs HK Beostar 3:0 (0:0,1:0,2:0)
- 18.12.07 Beograd - HK Crvena Zvezda vs HK Novi Sad 4:5 (2:0,2:1,0:4)
- 21.12.07 Novi Sad - HK Vojvodina vs HK Beostar 2:1
- 04.01.08 Beograd - HK Partizan vs HK Vojvodina
- 04.01.08 Novi Sad - HK Novi Sad vs HK Crvena Zvezda 2:4 (2:2,0:2,0:0)
- 08.01.08 Novi Sad - HK Novi Sad vs HK Partizan 1:3 (1:2, 0:0, 0:1)
- 08.01.08 Beograd - HK Crvena Zvezda vs HK Beostar 4:1
- 11.01.08 Novi Sad - HK Novi Sad vs HK Beostar
- 15.01.08 Novi Beograd - HK Beostar vs HK Novi Sad
- 15.01.08 Novi Sad - HK Vojvodina vs HK Partizan
- 25.01.08 Beograd - HK Partizan vs HK Crvena Zvezda 2:8 (1:2,0:4,1:2)
- 25.01.08 Novi Sad - HK Vojvodina vs HK Novi Sad 3:4 (2:2,1:2,0:0)
- 29.01.08 Beograd - HK Crvena Zvezda vs HK Vojvodina 5:4 (0:0,2:2,3:2)
- 29.01.08 Novi Beograd - HK Beostar vs HK Partizan 1:2 OT
- 01.02.08 Beograd - HK Crvena Zvezda vs HK Partizan 4:5 (1:2,0:1,3:2)
- 05.02.08 Novi Sad - HK Vojvodina vs HK Novi Sad 2:3 OT (0:1,0:1,2:0,0:1)
- 05.02.08 Beograd - HK Partizan vs HK Beostar 5:1 (2:0,0:1, 3:0)
- 08.02.08 Novi Beograd - HK Beostar vs HK Vojvodina
- 08.02.08 Novi Sad - HK Novi Sad vs HK Crvena Zvezda 4:1 (2:0,1:0,1:1)
- 12.02.08 Novi Sad - HK Novi Sad vs HK Beostar 11:2
- 12.02.08 Beograd - HK Partizan vs HK Vojvodina 1:5 (0:1, 1:1, 0:3)
- 15.02.08 Beograd - HK Crvena Zvezda vs HK Vojvodina 0:8 (0:1,0:4,0:3)
- 19.02.08 Novi Sad - HK Vojvodina vs HK Crvena Zvezda
- 19.02.08 Beograd - HK Partizan vs HK Beostar 5:2 (1:0, 1:2, 3:0)
- 22.02.08 Beograd - HK Partizan vs HK Novi Sad 3:1 (1:0, 0:0, 2:1)
- 22.02.08 Novi Beograd - HK Beostar vs HK Crvena Zvezda
- 26.02.08 Beograd - HK Crvena Zvezda vs HK Partizan 2:4 (0:1, 2:1, 0:2)
- 26.02.08 Novi Sad - HK Novi Sad vs HK Vojvodina 3:6
- Some additional games were played, to make up for games that got canceled. Results may be added at a later time to the list.
