= İzmir Büyükşehir Belediyesi GSK (men's ice hockey) =

İzmir BB GSK
- City: İzmir, Turkey
- League: Turkish Ice Hockey Super League (TBHSL)
- Founded: 2000
- Home arena: Bornova Ice Sports Hall
- General manager: Mehmet Tataroğulları
- Head coach: Mehmet Tataroğulları

Championships
- Regular season titles: 2013–14

İzmir BB GSK, short for İzmir Büyükşehir Belediyesi Gençlik Spor Kulübü, is the ice hockey section of the same named multi-sport club in İzmir, Turkey founded by the metropolitan municipality (Turkish: Büyükşehir Belediyesi) in 2000. Currently, the team compete in the Turkish Ice Hockey Super League (TBHSL). The team play their home matches in the Bornova Ice Sports Hall.

== Achievements ==
The team was runner-up in the seasons 2012–13, 2014–15 and 2015–16. They enjoyed league champion title in the 2013–14 season, and played so at the 2014–15 IIHF Continental Cup Group A.

Host	Round	Date	Opponent	Result
2014–15 IIHF Continental Cup
Bulgaria, Sofia	First; Gr. A	Sep 26, 2014	(Serbia) HK Beostar	L 2-20
Bulgaria, Sofia	First; Gr. A	Sep 27, 2014	(Bulgaria) CSKA Sofia	L 3-19
Bulgaria, Sofia	First; Gr. A	Sep 28, 2014	(Spain) CG Puigcerdà	L 1-20

== Current roster ==
As o 2014–15 season.

Goaltenders
No.	Player	Nationality	Date of Birth and age	Catches	Height	Weight
30	Nevzat Altun	(Turkey)	June 20, 1979 (age 46)	L	1.75 m (5 ft 9 in)	80 kg (180 lb)
	Eray Atalı	(Turkey)	November 5, 1989 (age 36)	L	1.75 m (5 ft 9 in)	65 kg (143 lb)
33	Cüneyt Ergenç	(Turkey)	August 8, 1990 (age 35)	R	1.75 m (5 ft 9 in)	65 kg (143 lb)
	Levent Özbaydoğan	(Turkey)	September 10, 1981 (age 44)	L	1.87 m (6 ft 1 1/2 in)	80 kg (180 lb)
Defense
No.	Player	Nationality	Date of Birth and age	Shoots	Height	Weight
35	Burak Savaş Aktürk	(Turkey)	May 23, 1989 (age 36)	R	1.74 m (5 ft 8 1/2 in)	73 kg (161 lb)
68	Oğuzhan Başak	(Turkey)	July 6, 1997 (age 28)	L	1.70 m (5 ft 7 in)	60 kg (130 lb)
27	Cüneyt Baykan	(Turkey)	January 2, 1991 (age 35)	R	1.80 m (5 ft 11 in)	70 kg (150 lb)
	Gürkan Çetinkaya	(Turkey)	December 4, 1987 (age 38)	R	1.85 m (6 ft 1 in)	80 kg (180 lb)
20	Alihan Demirer	(Turkey)	August 1, 1995 (age 30)	R	1.78 m (5 ft 10 in)	80 kg (180 lb)
82	Emre Faner	(Turkey)	March 24, 1994 (age 31)	R	1.76 m (5 ft 9 1/2 in)	75 kg (165 lb)
84	Fatih Faner	(Turkey)	March 12, 1997 (age 28)	R	1.77 m (5 ft 9 1/2 in)	75 kg (165 lb)
Forwards
No.	Player	Nationality	Date of Birth and age	Shoots	Height	Weight
12	Batuhan Akay	(Turkey)	March 3, 1995 (age 30)	R	1.78 m (5 ft 10 in)	73 kg (161 lb)
10	Erdoğan Coşkun	(Turkey)	August 8, 1983 (age 42)	L	1.85 m (6 ft 1 in)	78 kg (172 lb)
22	Gökcan Demirezer	(Turkey)	December 4, 1996 (age 29)	L	1.74 m (5 ft 8 1/2 in)	63 kg (139 lb)
88	Serkan Gümüş	(Turkey)	October 17, 1992 (age 33)	L	1.74 m (5 ft 8 1/2 in)	65 kg (143 lb)
19	usuf Halil	(Turkey)	September 10, 1991 (age 34)	R	1.75 m (5 ft 9 in)	66 kg (146 lb)
46	Aykut Koç	(Turkey)	June 26, 1981 (age 44)			
74	Mevlut Kumcu	(Turkey)	January 26, 1989 (age 36)	R	1.80 m (5 ft 11 in)	70 kg (150 lb)
	Ganim Kök	(Turkey)	June 9, 1995 (age 30)		1.72 m (5 ft 7 1/2 in)	70 kg (150 lb)
77	Alper Tanç	(Turkey)	March 7, 1996 (age 29)	R	1.77 m (5 ft 9 1/2 in)	67 kg (148 lb)
7	Ogün Uzunali	(Turkey)	April 8, 1996 (age 29)	L	1.78 m (5 ft 10 in)	75 kg (165 lb)

== Coaching staff ==
As of 2014–15 season.

- General Manager: Mehmet Tataroğulları
- Head coach: Mehmet Tataroğulları
