= 2010–11 Serbian Hockey League season =

Serbian ice hockey season

The 2010-11 Serbian Hockey League season was the 20th season of the Serbian Hockey League, the top level of ice hockey in Serbia. Four teams participated in the league, and HK Vojvodina Novi Sad won the championship.

== Regular season ==
Pl.	Club	GP	W	OTW	OTL	L	GF:GA	Pts
1	HK Spartak Subotica	8	5	0	0	3	29:19	13
2	KHK Crvena Zvezda	8	5	0	0	3	31:22	12
3	HK Vojvodina Novi Sad	8	2	0	0	6	21:40	3

== Playoffs ==
=== Semifinal ===
- HK Vojvodina Novi Sad – KHK Crvena Zvezda 6:7/4:10

=== Final ===
- KHK Crvena Zvezda – HK Spartak Subotica 7:2/5:0 Forfeit

=== Superfinal ===
- HK Partizan Belgrade – KHK Crvena Zvezda 4:2/11:1
