= Ivan Dornič =

Slovak ice hockey player

- Born: April 14, 1985 (age 41) Bratislava, Czechoslovakia
- Height: 6 ft 0 in (183 cm)
- Weight: 201 lb (91 kg; 14 st 5 lb)
- Position: Centre
- Shot: Right
- Slovak Extraliga team: MHC Martin
- NHL draft: 176th overall, 2003; New York Rangers
- Playing career: 2003–2021

Ivan Dornič is a Slovak professional ice hockey player in Slovakia recently with MHC Martin of the Slovak Extraliga. He was selected by the New York Rangers in the 6th round (176th overall) of the 2003 NHL entry draft.

== Career statistics ==
=== Regular season and playoffs ===
			Regular season					Playoffs
Season	Team	League	GP	G	A	Pts	PIM	GP	G	A	Pts	PIM
2000–01	HC Slovan Bratislava	SVK U18	30	18	6	24	10	3	0	1	1	6
2001–02	HC Slovan Bratislava	SVK U18	26	25	18	43	37	9	5	7	12	20
2001–02	HC Slovan Bratislava	SVK U20	8	2	0	2	0	13	1	1	2	2
2002–03	HC Slovan Bratislava	SVK U18	7	6	0	6	18	1	0	0	0	12
2002–03	HC Slovan Bratislava	SVK U20	33	13	13	26	45	—	—	—	—	—
2002–03	HC Slovan Bratislava	SVK	8	1	0	1	0	—	—	—	—	—
2003–04	Portland Winter Hawks	WHL	54	6	8	14	28	5	0	0	0	4
2004–05	Portland Winter Hawks	WHL	8	0	1	1	5	—	—	—	—	—
2004–05	HC Slovan Bratislava	SVK U20	10	7	5	12	26	1	0	1	1	2
2004–05	HC Slovan Bratislava	SVK	24	2	2	4	2	16	2	0	2	2
2004–05	HK Trnava	SVK.2	6	3	2	5	2	3	0	0	0	4
2005–06	HC Slovan Bratislava	SVK	31	2	2	4	26	—	—	—	—	—
2005–06	HK 36 Skalica	SVK	19	1	2	3	6	6	1	1	2	0
2006–07	HK 36 Skalica	SVK	20	2	2	4	14	—	—	—	—	—
2006–07	BK Mladá Boleslav	CZE.2	16	3	2	5	8	—	—	—	—	—
2007–08	HK Ardo Nitra	SVK	48	8	10	18	58	—	—	—	—	—
2008–09	MHC Martin	SVK	50	13	16	29	26	5	1	1	2	0
2009–10	MHC Martin	SVK	45	12	12	24	36	11	1	0	1	8
2010–11	HC 07 Detva	SVK.2	2	1	0	1	0	—	—	—	—	—
2010–11	Königsborner JEC	GER.3	24	14	11	25	8	—	—	—	—	—
2010–11	Rødovre Mighty Bulls	DEN	11	11	3	14	2	11	1	2	3	6
2011–12	Metallurg Zhlobin	BLR	25	9	7	16	8	—	—	—	—	—
2011–12	AaB Ishockey	DEN	10	6	6	12	2	5	0	1	1	6
2012–13	VEU Feldkirch	INL	27	9	11	20	42	—	—	—	—	—
2013–14	MsHK DOXXbet Žilina	SVK	12	0	1	1	14	—	—	—	—	—
2013–14	Aksam Unia Oświęcim	POL	9	1	1	2	0	—	—	—	—	—
2013–14	CSM Corona Brașov	MOL	5	2	2	4	0	10	4	3	7	6
2013–14	CSM Corona Brașov	ROU	—	—	—	—	—	9	3	2	5	4
2015–16	Dubai White Bears	UAE	10	7	7	14	16	3	3	0	3	0
2016–17	Dubai White Bears	UAE	12	14	11	25	4	2	0	0	0	2
2017–18	Dubai White Bears	UAE	9	13	17	30	8	2	1	2	3	0
2018–19	Dubai Vipers/White Bears	UAE	9	11	4	15	8	1	0	0	0	0
2019–20	Dubai Vipers/White Bears	UAE	2	0	0	0	2	—	—	—	—	—
2020–21	Dubai White Bears	UAE	6	9	6	15	6	3	1	3	4	6
SVK totals			257	41	47	88	182	38	5	2	7	10

=== International ===
Year	Team	Event	GP	G	A	Pts	PIM
2003	Slovakia	WJC18	7	1	1	2	6
Junior totals			7	1	1	2	6
