= 1997–98 Serbian Hockey League season =

Serbian ice hockey season

The 1997-98 Serbian Hockey League season was the seventh season of the Serbian Hockey League, the top level of ice hockey in Serbia (then the Federal Republic of Yugoslavia). Five teams participated in the league, and HK Vojvodina Novi Sad won the championship.

== Regular season ==
	Club	GP	W	T	L	GF–GA	Pts
1.	Vojvodina	16	14	1	1	112–33	29
2.	Crvena zvezda	16	12	0	4	89–37	24
3.	Partizan	16	6	2	8	81–87	14
4.	Taš	16	6	0	10	39–107	12
5.	Spartak Subotica	16	0	0	16	20–143	0

== Playoffs ==
=== Semifinals ===
- Taš – Vojvodina (10–9, 1–4)
- Partizan – Crvena zvezda (1–4, 4–13)

=== Final ===
- Vojvodina – Crvena zvezda (6–1, 4–2)
