= 1999–2000 Serbian Hockey League season =

1999-2000 Serbian Hockey League Season
- League: Serbian Hockey League
- Sport: Ice hockey
- Regular-season winner: (Federal Republic of Yugoslavia) HK Vojvodina
- Champions: (Federal Republic of Yugoslavia) HK Vojvodina
- Runners-up: (Federal Republic of Yugoslavia) HK Spartak

Serbian Hockey League seasons
- ← 1997-98 2000-01 →

The Serbian Hockey League Season for 1999-2000 was the ninth season of the league. Only three teams participated, as in the previous season. Once again, the teams from Belgrade were out because the arena in Belgrade was out. HK Vojvodina was the winner.

== Teams ==
- HK Vojvodina
- HK Spartak Subotica
- HK Novi Sad

== Regular season standings ==
Rk	Team	GP	W	T	L	Pts
1.	HK Vojvodina	8	7	0	1	14
2.	HK Spartak	8	5	0	3	10
3.	HK Novi Sad	8	0	0	8	0

== Playoffs ==
There were only the finals. HK Vojvodina beat HK Spartak.

- Game 1 - HK Vojvodina vs HK Spartak 5-2
- Game 2 - HK Vojvodina vs HK Spartak 6-7
- Game 3 - HK Vojvodina vs HK Spartak 3-0
