= 2003–04 Panonian League season =

2003–2004 Panonian League Season
- League: Panonian League
- Sport: Ice hockey
- Regular-season winner: (Romania) SC Miercurea Ciuc
- Champions: (Romania) SC Miercurea Ciuc
- Runners-up: (Hungary) Ferencvárosi TC

Panonian League seasons
- ← 2002–2003 2007–2008 →

The 2003–2004 Panonian League season was the second season of the multinational Panonian league. As in the previous season, teams from Hungary, Romania, and Croatia participated. A newcomer, HK Vojvodina from Serbia (then Serbia and Montenegro), participated too. At the end of the season, the playoffs were held. The top two teams in the regular season qualified for the playoffs. The season lasted from October 25, 2003, to February 10, 2004.

The league was abandoned after the season, as the teams from Hungary and Romania went off to form their own new league, the MOL Liga. It would not be until 2007 that the league once again functioned.

== Teams ==
- (Croatia) KHL Medveščak II
- (Croatia) KHL Mladost
- (Croatia) KHL Zagreb
- (Hungary) Ferencvárosi TC
- (Romania) SC Miercurea Ciuc
- (Serbia and Montenegro) HK Vojvodina

== Final standings ==
=== 2003-2004 season ===
Rk	Team	GP	W	T	L	GF	GA	Pts
1.	(Romania) SC Miercurea Ciuc	10	9	0	1	85	20	27
2.	(Croatia) KHL Zagreb	10	7	0	3	75	36	21
3.	(Hungary) Ferencvárosi TC	10	6	0	4	84	31	18
4.	(Serbia and Montenegro) HK Vojvodina	10	6	0	4	49	41	18
5.	(Croatia) KHL Mladost	10	1	1	8	25	94	4
5.	(Croatia) KHL Medveščak II	10	0	1	9	12	108	1

== Playoffs ==
=== Semifinals ===
The semifinals were held on February 7 & February 11, 2004.

- SC Miercurea Ciuc got by HK Vojvodina 2-0. Both games were forfeited by HK Vojvodina.
  - Game 1 - SC Miercurea Ciuc - HK Vojvodina 5-0 (forfeit)
  - Game 2 - HK Vojvodina - SC Miercurea Ciuc 0-5 (forfeit)
- Ferencvárosi TC defeated KHL Zagreb in a best of two series, winning in goal differential.
  - Game 1 - KHL Zagreb - Ferencvárosi TC 5-4 (1-3,3-0,1-1)
  - Game 2 - Ferencvárosi TC - KHL Zagreb 10-4 (4-0,2-3,4-1)

=== Finals ===
The finals were held on the 25th and 28 March 2004.

- SC Miercurea Ciuc beat Ferencvárosi TC in a best of two series, winning in goal differential.
  - Game 1 - Ferencvárosi TC - SC Miercurea Ciuc 5-0 (forfeit)
  - Game 2 - SC Miercurea Ciuc - Ferencvárosi TC 1-5 (7-1 t.a.b. (2-0,2-1,2-0,0-0,1-0)

== Games ==
- 25/10/2003 Vojvodina Novi Sad (SCG) - Mladost Zagreb (CRO) 10-0 (4-0,3-0,3-0)
- 02/11/2003 Vojvodina Novi Sad - Ferencvárosi TC Budapest (HUN) 6-2 (2-0,3-1,1-1)
- 03/11/2003 KHL Zagreb (CRO) - Mladost Zagreb 8-2 (1-1,2-1,5-0)
- 10/11/2003 Ferencvárosi TC Budapest - Medvescak II Zagreb 15-0 (2-0,6-0,7-0)
- 11/11/2003 Miercurea-Ciuc (ROU) - Vojvodina Novi Sad 7-1 (4-1,2-0,1-0)
- 15/11/2003 KHL Zagreb - Medvescak II Zagreb 16-0
- 17/11/2003 Miercurea-Ciuc - Mladost Zagreb 11-1 (5-1,2-0,4-0)
- 17/11/2003 Medvescak II Zagreb - Ferencvárosi TC Budapest 0-6 (0-2,0-1,0-3)
- 22/11/2003 Vojvodina Novi Sad - KHL Zagreb 6-2 (2-1,1-1,3-0)
- 24/11/2003 Miercurea-Ciuc - Medvescak II Zagreb 19-1 (10-1,3-0,6-0)
- 24/11/2003 Ferencvárosi TC Budapest - Mladost Zagreb 20-0 (7-0,7-0,6-0)
- 28/11/2003 KHL Zagreb - Ferencvárosi TC Budapest 9-4 (2-2,4-0,3-2)
- 29/11/2003 Mladost Zagreb - Ferencvárosi TC Budapest 2-14 (0-7,0-4,2-3)
- 02/12/2003 Ferencvárosi TC Budapest - Miercurea-Ciuc 2-6 (0-1,1-4,1-1)
- 03/12/2003 Vojvodina Novi Sad - Miercurea-Ciuc 0-3 (0-0,0-1,0-2)
- 03/12/2003 Mladost Zagreb - KHL Zagreb 7-9 (2-6,3-1,2-2)
- 07/12/2003 Ferencváros Budapest - Vojvodina Novi Sad 9-3 (4-1,2-0,3-2)
- 15/12/2003 Miercurea-Ciuc - KHL Zagreb 5-0 by forfeit
- 17/12/2003 Medvescak II Zagreb - KHL Zagreb 0-14
- 21/12/2003 Vojvodina Novi Sad - Medvescak II Zagreb 11-1 (3-0,5-1,3-0)
- 14/01/2004 Miercurea-Ciuc - Ferencvárosi TC Budapest 4-3 (2-0,2-1,0-2)
- 18/01/2004 Medvescak II Zagreb - Vojvodina Novi Sad 4-5 (1-3,1-1,2-1)
- 19/01/2004 Mladost Zagreb - Vojvodina Novi Sad 2-5 (1-1,0-2,1-2)
- 21/01/2004 Mladost Zagreb - Medvescak II Zagreb 3-1 (0-0,2-1,1-0)
- 23/01/2004 KHL Zagreb - Vojvodina Novi Sad 11-2 (3-0,4-1,4-1)
- 26/01/2004 Mladost Zagreb - Miercurea-Ciuc 5-13 (2-3,0-5,3-5)
- 27/01/2004 KHL Zagreb - Miercurea-Ciuc 5-1 (2-0,1-0,2-1)
- 28/01/2004 Medvescak II Zagreb - Miercurea-Ciuc 2-16 (1-5,0-5,1-6)
- 03/02/2004 Ferencvárosi TC Budapest - KHL Zagreb 9-1 (2-0,4-1,3-1)* (replayed due to poor ice conditions, score 4-3)
- 10/02/2004 Medvescak II Zagreb - Mladost Zagreb 3-3 (1-1,0-2,2-0)
