= HK Vitez =

- City: Belgrade, Serbia
- League: Serbian Hockey League
- Founded: 2001
- Home arena: Pingvin Hall
- Colours: Blue, white, red

Franchise history
- HK Vitez

HK Vitez was an ice hockey team in Belgrade, Serbia. They last played in the Serbian Hockey League, the top level of ice hockey in Serbia. Vitez played its home games at Pingvin Hall.

== History ==
The club was founded in 2001. They finished in second place to HK Partizan in the Serbian Hockey League in the 2011-12 and 2012-13 seasons.

Vitez took part in the 2012–13 IIHF Continental Cup, finishing in third place in Group A after defeating Maccabi Metulla and losing to Başkent Yıldızları and HSC Csíkszereda.

== Honours ==
- Serbian Hockey League:

Runners-up (2): 2012, 2013
