= 2002–03 Panonian League season =

2002–2003 Panonian League Season
- League: Panonian League
- Sport: Ice hockey
- Regular-season winner: (Hungary) Ferencvárosi TC
- Champions: (Hungary) Ferencvárosi TC
- Runners-up: (Romania) SC Miercurea Ciuc

Panonian League seasons
- ← None 2003–2004 →

The 2002–2003 Panonian League Season was the first season of the multinational Panonian league. Teams from Hungary, Romania and Croatia participated. At the end of the season the playoffs were held. The top two teams in the regular season qualified for the playoffs. The season lasted from November 12, 2002 to February 5, 2003.

== Teams ==
- (Croatia) KHL Mladost
- (Croatia) KHL Zagreb
- (Hungary) Ferencvárosi TC
- (Romania) Progym Hargita Gyöngye
- (Romania) SC Miercurea Ciuc

== Final standings ==
Rk	Team	GP	W	OTW	OTL	L	GF	GA	Pts
1.	(Hungary) Ferencvárosi TC	8	6	0	1	1	46	18	19
2.	(Romania) SC Miercurea Ciuc	8	5	1	0	2	39	19	17
3.	(Croatia) KHL Zagreb	8	5	0	0	3	44	27	15
4.	(Romania) Progym Hargita Gyöngye	8	3	0	0	5	34	37	9
5.	(Croatia) KHL Mladost	8	0	0	0	8	9	71	0

== Playoffs ==
Ferencvárosi TC swept SC Miercurea Ciuc 2-0 in a best of three series.

- Game 1 February 18 - Miercurea-Ciuc - Ferencvárosi 1-2 (0-1,1-0,0-1)
- Game 2 March 11 - Ferencvárosi - Miercurea-Ciuc 1-5 (1-2,0-1,0-2), 0-0 in overtime, 2-0 in a shootout

== Games ==
- 12/11/2002 Progym Gheorgheni (ROU) - Mladost Zagreb (CRO) 8-2 (3-0,1-2,4-0)
- 13/11/2002 SC Miercurea-Ciuc (ROU) - Mladost Zagreb 7-0 (2-0,3-0,2-0)
- 19/11/2002 Progym Gheorgheni - KHL Zagreb (CRO) 6-4 (1-2,4-1,1-1)
- 19/11/2002 SC Miercurea-Ciuc - Ferencvárosi TC Budapest (HUN) 4-6 (0-2,1-3,3-1)
- 20/11/2002 Progym Gheorgheni - Ferencvárosi TC Budapest 3-6 (1-2,1-2,1-2)
- 20/11/2002 SC Miercurea-Ciuc - KHL Zagreb 4-2 (0-1,1-0,3-1)
- 26/11/2002 KHL Zagreb - Ferencvárosi TC Budapest 4-0
- 03/12/2002 Ferencvárosi TC Budapest - Progym Gheorgheni 8-3 (3-0,3-2,2-1)
- 03/12/2002 KHL Zagreb - Mladost Zagreb 11-1 (4-0,3-1,4-0)
- 04/12/2002 Mladost Zagreb - KHL Zagreb 1-11 (1-3,0-4,0-4)
- 04/12/2002 Ferencvárosi TC Budapest - SC Miercurea-Ciuc 1-2 a.p. (0-0,0-1,1-0,0-1)
- 08/01/2003 Mladost Zagreb - SC Miercurea-Ciuc 2-9 (1-4,1-3,0-2)
- 09/01/2003 KHL Zagreb - SC Miercurea-Ciuc 5-4 (1-3,2-0,2-1)
- 21/01/2003 Ferencvárosi TC Budapest - Mladost Zagreb 9-1 (1-1,2-0,6-0)
- 22/01/2003 Ferencvárosi TC Budapest - KHL Zagreb 5-0 by forfeit*
- 27/01/2003 Mladost Zagreb - Ferencvárosi TC Budapest 1-11 (0-2,0-7,1-2)
- 28/01/2003 Mladost Zagreb - Progym Gheorgheni 1-5 (0-3,1-0,0-2)
- 29/01/2003 KHL Zagreb - Progym Gheorgheni 7-6 (1-3,3-1,3-2)
- 04/02/2003 SC Miercurea-Ciuc - Progym Gheorgheni 5-2 (0-0,3-0,2-2)
- 05/02/2003 Progym Gheorgheni - SC Miercurea-Ciuc 1-4 (0-2,0-0,1-2)
