= Panonian League =

- Most recent season or competition: 2008–09 Panonian League season
- Panonian League
- Sport: Ice hockey
- Founded: 2002
- Folded: 2009
- Country: Croatia; Hungary; Romania; Serbia
- Last champion: (Serbia) HK Vojvodina (1st title)

The Panonian League (Croatian and Serbian: Panonska Liga, Панонска Лига) was one of the multinational ice hockey leagues in Europe. The league was established in 2002 and originally comprised teams from Hungary, Romania and Croatia. HK Vojvodina became the first Serbian team to join the league in 2003–04. The league was temporarily abandoned after 2003-04 when Hungarian and Romanian teams went on to establish their own joint league, called the MOL Liga. The Panonian League was revived in 2007 with Croatian and Serbian teams, lasting until 2009. In total there were four seasons, from 2002 to 2004, and from 2007 to 2009.

== Former teams ==
- Croatia
- (Croatia) KHL Medveščak II (2003–2004)
- (Croatia) KHL Mladost (2002–2004), (2007–2009)
- (Croatia) KHL Zagreb (2002–2004), (2007–2009)
- Hungary
- (Hungary) Ferencvárosi TC (2002–2004)
- Romania
- (Romania) SC Miercurea Ciuc (2002–2004)
- (Romania) Progym Hargita Gyöngye (2002–2003)
- Serbia
- (Serbia) HK Beostar (2007–2009)
- (Serbia) KHK Crvena Zvezda (2007–2009)
- (Serbia) HK Novi Sad (2007–2009)
- (Serbia) HK Partizan (2007–2009)
- (Serbia and Montenegro) / (Serbia) HK Vojvodina (2003–2004), (2007–2009)

== Seasons and league champions ==
- 2002–2003: (Hungary) Ferencvárosi TC
- 2003–2004: (Romania) SC Miercurea Ciuc
- 2007–2008: (Croatia) KHL Mladost
- 2008–2009: (Serbia) HK Vojvodina

== Season results overview ==
Season	Champions	Runners-up	Final series score	Third place finisher	Regular season winner
2002–2003	(Hungary) Ferencvárosi TC	(Romania) SC Miercurea Ciuc	2–0	(Croatia) KHL Zagreb	(Hungary) Ferencvárosi TC
2003–2004	(Romania) SC Miercurea Ciuc	(Hungary) Ferencvárosi TC	2–0	(Croatia) KHL Zagreb	(Romania) SC Miercurea Ciuc
2007–2008	(Croatia) KHL Mladost	(Serbia) HK Partizan	^{[np]}	(Serbia) HK Novi Sad	(Croatia) KHL Mladost
2008–2009	(Serbia) HK Vojvodina	(Serbia) HK Partizan	3–2	(Serbia) KHK Crvena Zvezda	(Serbia) HK Partizan

- ^{[np]} There were no playoffs that year. The team that finished in first place at the end of the regular season won the overall league title.

== See also ==
- Erste Liga
- Slohokej League
- Balkan League
- International Hockey League
