= 2013–14 OB I bajnoksag season =

Hungarian ice hockey season

The 2013–14 OB I bajnoksag season is the 77th season of the OB I bajnoksag, the top level of ice hockey in Hungary. The league proper was not contested this season, as four of the top Hungarian teams competed in the multi-national MOL Liga. The top-ranked Hungarian team in the league was crowned national champions. Dab.Docler was recognized as Hungarian champion this year.

== Teams ==
Club	City	Arena	Capacity	Founded
Dab.Docler	Dunaújváros	Dunaújvárosi Jégcsarnok	4000	1977
Ferencvárosi TC	Budapest	Pesterzsébeti Jégcsarnok	1500	1928
Miskolci Jegesmedvék JSE	Miskolc	Miskolci Jégcsarnok	1300	1978
Újpesti TE	Budapest	Újpesti Jégcsarnok	1300	1955

== Results ==
Game by game results can be viewed here
