= HK NS Stars =

NS Stars
- City: Novi Sad
- League: Serbian Hockey League
- Founded: 2002
- Home arena: Spens Sports Center (capacity: 1,000)
- Colours: Two blue (dark, light)
- Website: http://nsstars.hockey/

Franchise history
- 2002 - present: NS Stars Ice Hockey Club

HK NS Stars is a developmental ice hockey club from Novi Sad, Serbia. The club has sections in junior divisions, categories U8 to U18. The players of the club that play hockey beyond the junior level tend to join regional senior clubs when they become adults.

== Honours ==
- Serbian Hockey League U12
  - Winners (2): 2005, 2019
- Serbian Hockey League U18
  - Winners (1): 2012
