= Ice Sports Hall =

Ice rink in İzmir, Turkey

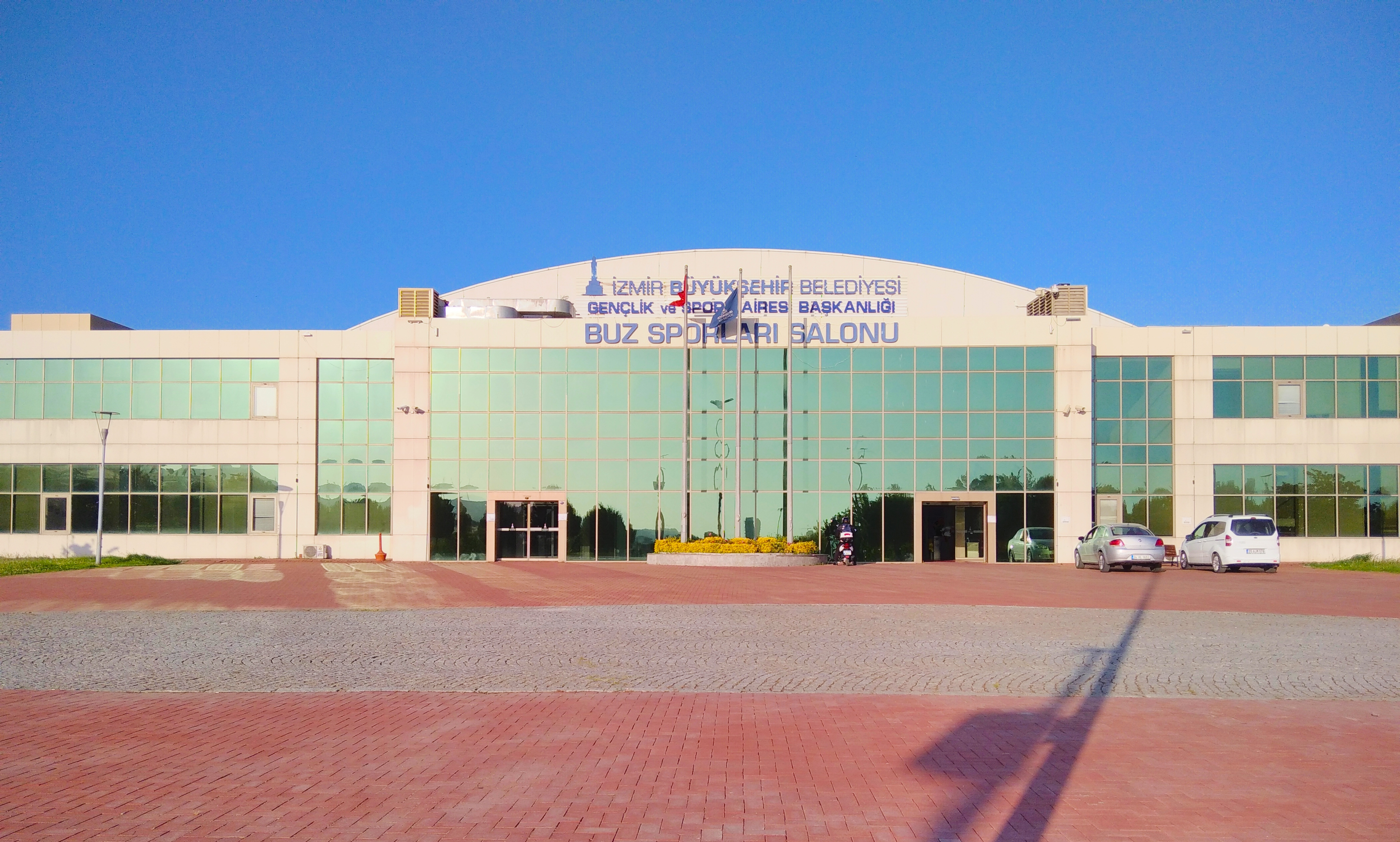
- Interactive map of Ice Sports Hall
- Full name: Buz Sporları Salonu
- Location: Erzene Mah., Bornova, İzmir, Turkey
- Coordinates: 38.46802°N 27.21260°E
- Owner: İzmir Metropolitan Municipality
- Capacity: 1,751
- Surface: 12,000 m^{2} (130,000 sq ft)

Construction
- Opened: September 28, 2010

Tenant
- İzmir Büyükşehir Belediyespor

Ice Sports Hall (Turkish: Buz Sporları Salonu), aka İzmir Metropolitan Municipality Ice Sports Hall (Turkish: İzmir Büyükşehir Belediyesi Buz Sporları Salonu) is an indoor ice skating and ice hockey rink located within the Aşık Veysel Recreation Area in Bornova district of İzmir, western Turkey. It was opened on September 28, 2010.

Owned by the İzmir Metropolitan Municipality, the venue has a seating capacity of 1,751 spectators.

== International events hosted ==
- 2013 IIHF Women's World Championship Division II - Group B Qualification - December 7–9, 2012
- 2014 World Junior Ice Hockey Championships – Division III- April 3–12, 2014
- 2015 IIHF World Championship Division III- April 3–12, 2015
