= 2013–14 Romanian Hockey League season =

Romanian ice hockey season

The 2013–14 Romanian Hockey League season was the 84th season of the Romanian Hockey League, the top level of ice hockey in Romania. Six teams participated in the league, and ASC Corona 2010 Braşov won the championship.

== Regular season ==
	Club	GP	W	OTW	OTL	L	GF–GA	Pts
1.	Steaua Rangers	24	19	1	2	2	196:70	61
2.	CS Progym Gheorgheni	24	14	2	2	6	149:70	48
3.	CSM Dunărea Galați	24	10	2	1	11	139:121	35
4.	Sportul Studențesc	24	0	0	0	24	48:271	0

== 5th place game ==
- CSM Dunărea Galați - Sportul Studențesc 3:0 (10:5, 15:1, 9:5)

== Playoffs ==
=== Semifinals ===
- Steaua Rangers - HSC Csíkszereda 0:3 (2:4, 1:9, 2:9)
- CS Progym Gheorgheni - ASC Corona Brașov 0:3 (3:4, 2:3, 2:5)

=== 3rd place game ===
- Steaua Rangers - CS Progym Gheorgheni 1:3 (6:3, 2:4, 4:5, 0:4)

=== Final ===
- ASC Corona Brașov - HSC Csíkszereda 4:3 (3:1, 1:2, 2:5, 3:2 OT, 4:3 OT, 1:3, 4:3)
