= 1991–92 Serbian Hockey League season =

Serbian ice hockey season

The 1991–92 Serbian Hockey League season was the first season of the league after the Yugoslav Ice Hockey League was dissolved after the 1990–91 season. KHK Crvena Zvezda won the inaugural Serbian Championship.
