= HK Taš =

- City: Belgrade
- Founded: 1995
- Home arena: Pionir (capacity: 2,000)
- Colours

Franchise history
- Hokejaški Klub Taš

Former logo

HK Taš is a developmental ice hockey club in Belgrade, Serbia. HK Taš was formed in 1995. The club built from bottom up, starting out with junior teams only. They also used to play in the Serbian Hockey League.
