= Serbian Hockey League =

Serbian men's ice hockey top division

- Sport: Ice hockey
- Founded: 2006
- Founder: Serbian Ice Hockey Association
- No. of teams: 4
- Country: Serbia
- Most recent champion: SKHL Crvena zvezda (13th title)
- Most titles: HK Partizan (20 titles)
- Website: hockeyserbia.com/seniori/

The Serbian Hockey League is the top league for ice hockey in Serbia.

== Current teams ==
The total number of teams varies from season to season, as certain clubs can't fill their senior teams due to lack of players or finances. Some clubs only participate in the junior sections.

=== Map ===
Locations of the 2026–27 Serbian Hockey League teams

The following 4 clubs compete in the Serbian Hockey League during the 2026–27 season:

Serbian Hockey League
| Team | City | Arena | Founded |
| Crvena zvezda | Belgrade | Pionir Ice Hall | 1946 |
| Partizan | Belgrade | Pionir Ice Hall | 1948 |
| Pro Stars | Novi Sad | SPENS Ice Hall | 2024 |
| Vojvodina | Novi Sad | SPENS Ice Hall | 1957 |

| Clubs in the 2026–27 International Hockey League |
| Clubs in the 2026–27 International Hockey League and 2026–27 Balkan Hockey Championship |

== Champions ==
Kingdom of Yugoslavia and Socialist Federal Republic of Yugoslavia (1936–1992)

- until 1991 – Yugoslav Hockey League
- 1991–92 – SKHL Crvena zvezda

Serbia and Montenegro (1992–2006)

- 1992–93 – SKHL Crvena zvezda
- 1993–94 – HK Partizan
- 1994–95 – HK Partizan
- 1995–96 – SKHL Crvena zvezda
- 1996–97 – SKHL Crvena zvezda
- 1997–98 – HK Vojvodina
- 1998–99 – HK Vojvodina
- 1999–2000 – HK Vojvodina
- 2000–01 – HK Vojvodina
- 2001–02 – HK Vojvodina
- 2002–03 – HK Vojvodina
- 2003–04 – HK Vojvodina
- 2004–05 – SKHL Crvena zvezda
- 2005–06 – HK Partizan

Serbia (2006–)

- 2006–07 – HK Partizan
- 2007–08 – HK Partizan
- 2008–09 – HK Partizan
- 2009–10 – HK Partizan
- 2010–11 – HK Partizan
- 2011–12 – HK Partizan
- 2012–13 – HK Partizan
- 2013–14 – HK Partizan
- 2014–15 – HK Partizan
- 2015–16 – HK Partizan
- 2016–17 – HK Beograd
- 2017–18 – SKHL Crvena zvezda
- 2018–19 – SKHL Crvena zvezda
- 2019–20 – SKHL Crvena zvezda
- 2020–21 – SKHL Crvena zvezda
- 2021–22 – HK Vojvodina
- 2022–23 – SKHL Crvena zvezda
- 2023–24 – SKHL Crvena zvezda
- 2024–25 – SKHL Crvena zvezda
- 2025–26 – SKHL Crvena zvezda

| Club | Winners | Winning years |
|---|---|---|
| HK Partizan | 13 | 1994, 1995, 2006, 2007, 2008, 2009, 2010, 2011, 2012, 2013, 2014, 2015, 2016 |
| SKHL Crvena zvezda | 13 | 1992, 1993, 1996, 1997, 2005, 2018, 2019, 2020, 2021, 2023, 2024, 2025, 2026 |
| HK Vojvodina | 8 | 1998, 1999, 2000, 2001, 2002, 2003, 2004, 2022 |
| HK Beograd | 1 | 2017 |

== All-time champions ==
- Including titles in Yugoslavia

| Club | Winners | Winning years |
|---|---|---|
| Partizan | 20 | 1948, 1951, 1952, 1953, 1954, 1955, 1986, 1994, 1995, 2006, 2007, 2008, 2009, 2010, 2011, 2012, 2013, 2014, 2015, 2016 |
| Crvena zvezda | 13 | 1992, 1993, 1996, 1997, 2005, 2018, 2019, 2020, 2021, 2023, 2024, 2025, 2026 |
| Vojvodina | 8 | 1998, 1999, 2000, 2001, 2002, 2003, 2004, 2022 |
| Beograd | 1 | 2017 |

== Serbian ice hockey clubs in regional competitions ==
Slohokej League

| Team | Winner | Years won |
|---|---|---|
| Partizan | 2 | 2011, 2012 |

Balkan League

| Team | Winner | Years won |
|---|---|---|
| Partizan | 1 | 1995 |

Panonian League

| Team | Winner | Years won |
|---|---|---|
| Vojvodina | 1 | 2009 |

International Hockey League

| Team | Winner | Years won |
|---|---|---|
| Crvena zvezda | 1 | 2019 |

Balkan Ice Hockey League

| Team | Winner | Years won |
|---|---|---|
| Spartak | 1 | 2016 |

== See also ==
- Yugoslav Ice Hockey League
- Balkan League (ice hockey)
- Panonian League
- Slohokej League
- Serbian Cup (ice hockey)
