= HK Beostar =

- City: Belgrade
- League: Serbian Hockey League; 2006 -present: Panonian League 2007-2009
- Founded: 2002
- Home arena: Pingvin Hall (capacity: 1,000)
- Colours
- Head coach: (Serbia) Nenad Ilic
- Website: http://www.hkbeostar.rs/

Franchise history
- Hokejaški Klub Beostar

HK Beostar was an ice hockey club from Belgrade, Serbia that played in the binational Panonian League. It was based in the Novi Beograd part of Belgrade and had its own arena called Pingvin Hala. The club was founded in 2002, and its first adult league season was in 2006.

== Season by season record ==
Note: GP = Games Played, W = Wins, L = Losses, T = Ties, OTL = Overtime Losses, Pts = Points, GF = Goals for, GA = Goals against

Season	GP	W	OTW	OTL	L	Pts	GF	GA	Finish	Playoffs
2007–08 Serbian Hockey League	24	4	0	4	16	16	45	97	5th, League	Did not qualify
2008–09 Serbian Hockey League	16	1	0	0	15	3	26	129	5th, League	Did not qualify

== Honours ==
- Serbian Hockey League:

Runners-up (2): 2014, 2015
