= HK Novi Sad =

- City: Novi Sad
- League: Serbian Hockey League 1998-present: Panonian League 2007-2009
- Founded: 1998
- Home arena: Spens Sports Center (capacity: 1,000)
- Colours
- Head coach: (Slovakia) Roman Pristov

Franchise history
- Hokejaški Klub Novi Sad

HK Novi Sad was an ice hockey club from Novi Sad, Serbia. It played its home games at SPENS, located in Novi Sad.

HK Novi Sad was founded in 1998 and stopped competing in 2009 due to economic reasons.

== Honours ==
- Serbian Hockey League:

Runners-up (3): 1999, 2003, 2008
