= HK Vojvodina =

- City: Novi Sad
- League: International Hockey League; Serbian Hockey League
- Founded: 1957; 69 years ago
- Home arena: Spens Sports Center
- Colours: Red, white
- Website: http://vojvodinahc.com/

Hokejaški Klub Vojvodina is a professional ice hockey team from Novi Sad, Vojvodina, Serbia, founded in 1957. In its history it has won eight national championships. They play their home games at SPENS, located in Novi Sad. The team is part of the Vojvodina Novi Sad sports society.

== Honours ==
- Serbian Hockey League
  - Winners (8): 1998, 1999, 2000, 2001, 2002, 2003, 2004, 2022
- Serbian Ice Hockey Cup

Winners (3): 1999, 2000, 2001

- Panonian League

Winners (1): 2009

== See also ==
- OK Vojvodina – Vojvodina volleyball club
- FK Vojvodina – Vojvodina football club
- KK Vojvodina – Vojvodina basketball club
