= HK Spartak Subotica =

- City: Subotica
- League: Serbian Hockey League: Yugoslav Hockey League
- Founded: 1939
- Home arena: Stadion malih sportova (capacity: 4,000)
- Colours
- Website: http://hkspartak.orgfree.com/

Franchise history
- Hokejaški Klub Spartak

Hokejaški klub Spartak (Serbian Cyrillic: Хокејашки клуб Спартак; English: Spartak Hockey Club) is a professional ice hockey team from Subotica, Serbia, currently playing in the Serbian Hockey League. It has a few tiers - juniors and adults. The club is a part of the SD Spartak Subotica sports association.

== History ==
Hockey in Subotica was played before World War II. Back then it was played on the nearby Palić Lake when it was frozen in winter. Club was founded in 1939 under the name SK Palić and as part of SDŽ Spartak in 1945. The first championship match was played in 1941. The construction of artificial ice, since 1969 has helped development of the club. The club has played in the Yugoslav Hockey League, and afterwards in the Serbian Hockey League. However, it has not played in every season due to various difficulties - number of players and finances for example.

== Honours ==
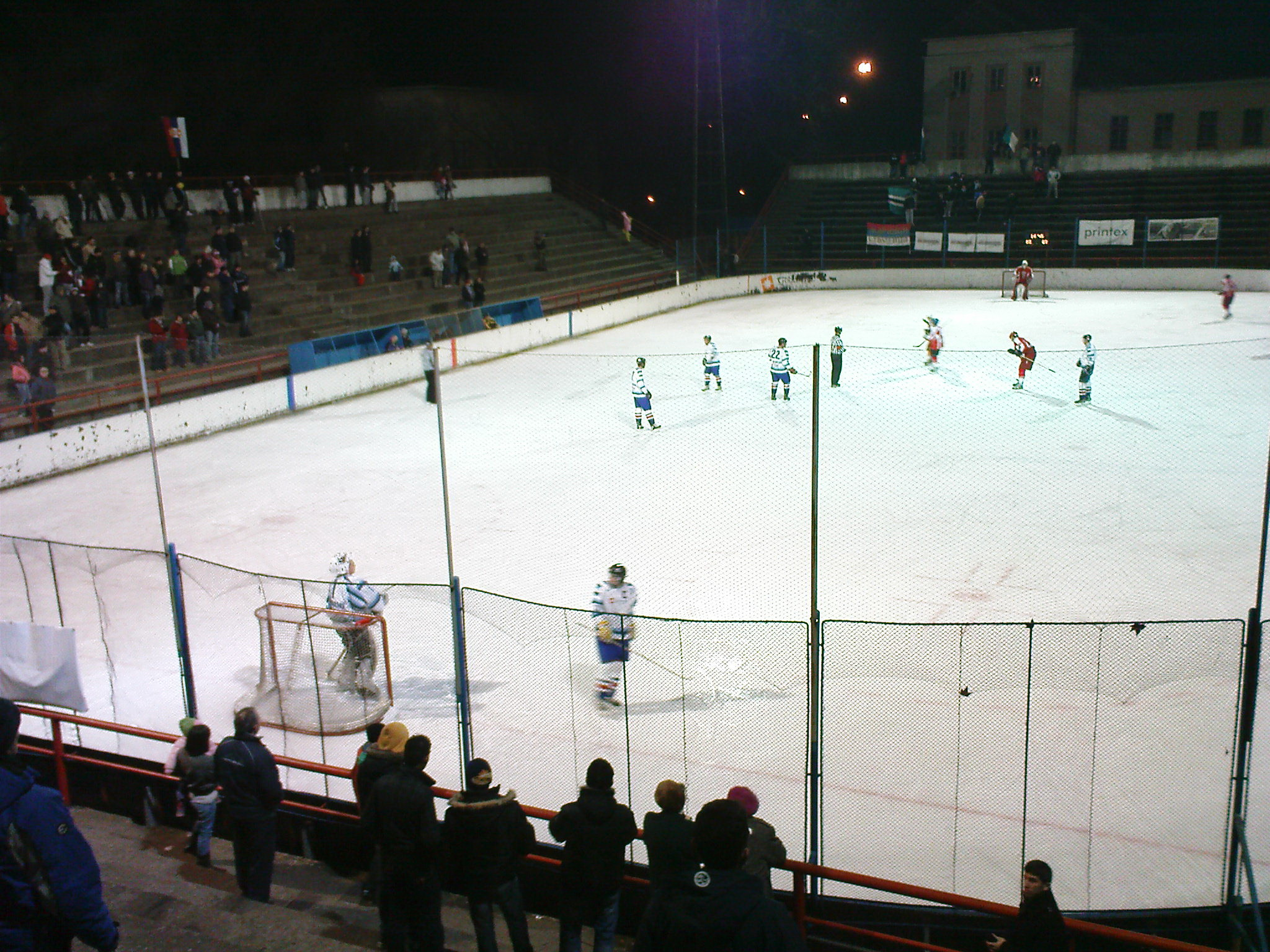
Spartak - Vojvodina match played in 2010

- Serbian Hockey League:

Runners-up (4): 1992, 1993, 2000, 2010

- Balkan Ice Hockey League:

Winners (1): 2016
