= SKHL Crvena zvezda =

Serbian ice hockey team

- City: Belgrade, Serbia
- League: International Hockey League; Serbian Hockey League
- Founded: 1946
- Home arena: Pionir Ice Hall
- Colours: Red, white
- Head coach: Igor Gile Kosović

Franchise history
- 1946–present: SKHL Crvena zvezda

Championships
- Serbian League: 1992, 1993, 1996, 1997, 2005, 2018, 2019, 2020, 2021, 2023, 2024, 2025, 2026

Sportski klub za hokej na ledu Crvena zvezda is a professional ice hockey team from Belgrade, Serbia, currently playing in the International Hockey League and the Serbian Hockey League. The club is a part of the SD Crvena Zvezda sports association.

SKHL Crvena zvezda was established in 1946 and played in the Yugoslav Ice Hockey League until 1991. Since 1992, the club has won nine national league titles in the Serbian Hockey League, its last national championship coming in 2021. Red Star played two seasons in the now defunct Panonian League between 2007 and 2009.

Red Star play their home games at Pionir Ice Hall in Belgrade.

== Honours and achievements ==
- Yugoslav Ice Hockey League

Runners-up (1): 1985

- Serbian Hockey League

Winners (13): 1992, 1993, 1996, 1997, 2005, 2018, 2019, 2020, 2021, 2023, 2024, 2025, 2026

- Serbian Hockey Cup

Winners (5): 1980, 1992, 1996, 1997, 1998

- International Hockey League

Winners (1): 2019

== See also ==
- Red Star Belgrade (football team)
