= 2021 IIHF World Championship Group A =

Group A was one of two groups of the 2021 IIHF World Championship. The four best-placed teams advanced to the playoff round.

Due to COVID-19 pandemic protocols, the tournament was held in a "bubble" behind closed doors with no spectators. Prior to the beginning of the tournament, and against objections by Prime Minister Krišjānis Kariņš and Minister of Health, Daniels Pavļuts, the Latvian parliament voted in favour of a notion ordering the government to develop a plan for allowing spectators who are either fully vaccinated or otherwise immune due to recent infection.

== Standings ==
Pos	Team	Pld	W	OTW	OTL	L	GF	GA	GD	Pts	Qualification
1	ROC	7	5	1	0	1	28	10	+18	17	Quarterfinals
2	Switzerland	7	5	0	0	2	27	17	+10	15	Quarterfinals
3	Czech Republic	7	3	2	0	2	27	18	+9	13	Quarterfinals
4	Slovakia	7	4	0	0	3	17	22	−5	12	Quarterfinals
5	Sweden	7	3	0	1	3	21	14	+7	10	
6	Denmark	7	2	1	1	3	13	15	−2	9	
7	Great Britain	7	1	0	1	5	13	31	−18	4 (Note: Belarus 3–4 Great Britain)	
8	Belarus	7	1	0	1	5	10	29	−19	4	

Source: IIHF
Rules for classification: 1) points; 2) head-to-head points; 3) head-to-head goal difference; 4) head-to-head number of goals scored; 5) result against closest best-ranked team outside tied teams; 6) result against second-best-ranked team outside tied teams; 7) seeding before tournament

== Matches ==
All times are local (UTC+3).

=== ROC vs Czech Republic ===
21 May 2021; 16:15	ROC	4–3 (1–1, 1–1, 2–1)	Czech Republic	Olympic Sports Centre, Riga

Game reference

Alexander Samonov
Goalies
Šimon Hrubec
Referees:
(Sweden) Tobias Björk
(Sweden) Mikael Nord
Linesmen:
(Denmark) Andreas Krøyer
(Sweden) Ludvig Lundgren

Burdasov (Grigorenko, Morozov) (PP) – 04:16	1–0
	1–1	09:26 – Flek (Špaček)
Shvets-Rogovoy (Kamenev) (SH) – 35:27	2–1
	2–2	37:53 – Vrána (Kubalík, Hájek)
Barabanov (Voronkov) – 45:28	3–2
	3–3	57:23 – Kubalík (Hronek, Kovář) (PP)
Grigorenko (Provorov) – 59:41	4–3

4 min
Penalties
6 min
28
Shots
25

=== Belarus vs Slovakia ===
21 May 2021; 20:15	Belarus	2–5 (0–3, 0–0, 2–2)	Slovakia	Olympic Sports Centre, Riga

Game reference

Konstantin Shostak
Danny Taylor
Goalies
Branislav Konrád
Referees:
(Latvia) Andris Ansons
(Finland) Lassi Heikkinen
Linesmen:
(Finland) Hannu Sormunen
(Latvia) Dāvis Zunde

	0–1	03:53 – Pospíšil (Nemec)
	0–2	09:17 – Cehlárik (Gernát, Studenič) (PP)
	0–3	11:02 – Pospíšil (Rosandić, Krištof) (PP)
	0–4	45:05 – Hrivík (Lantoši, Cehlárik)
Stefanovich (Kostitsyn) (PP2) – 53:25	1–4
Sharangovich – 54:22	2–4
	2–5	59:15 – Cehlárik (Grman) (EN)

37 min
Penalties
12 min
34
Shots
35

=== Denmark vs Sweden ===
22 May 2021; 12:15	Denmark	4–3 (0–0, 3–2, 1–1)	Sweden	Olympic Sports Centre, Riga

Game reference

Sebastian Dahm
Goalies
Viktor Fasth
Referees:
(Russia) Roman Gofman
(Belarus) Maxim Sidorenko
Linesmen:
(Belarus) Dmitri Golyak
(Russia) Nikita Shalagin

	0–1	22:06 – Klingberg
Nick. Jensen (Jakobsen, Nich. Jensen) – 30:40	1–1
	1–2	35:09 – Tömmernes (Klingberg)
Nick. Jensen (Bødker) – 37:33	2–2
Kristensen (Nick. Jensen, M. Lauridsen) – 38:09	3–2
Nick. Jensen (M. Lauridsen, Bødker) (PP) – 48:22	4–2
	4–3	50:56 – Klingberg (Lundkvist)

2 min
Penalties
8 min
22
Shots
23

=== Great Britain vs ROC ===
22 May 2021; 16:15	Great Britain	1–7 (1–4, 0–1, 0–2)	ROC	Olympic Sports Centre, Riga

Game reference

Jackson Whistle
Goalies
Ivan Bocharov
Referees:
(Austria) Christoph Sternat
(Switzerland) Michael Tscherrig
Linesmen:
(Germany) Jonas Merten
(Austria) Elias Seewald

	0–1	05:53 – Burdasov (Grigorenko, Ozhiganov) (PP)
	0–2	07:19 – Grigorenko (Voronkov, Zadorov) (SH)
	0–3	09:21 – Burdasov (Kuzmenko, Gavrikov)
	0–4	10:51 – Tolchinsky (Barabanov)
Kirk (Dowd, Connolly) (PP) – 18:46	1–4
	1–5	30:08 – Karnaukhov (Zadorov, Zub)
	1–6	49:59 – Kuzmenko (Burdasov, Ozhiganov) (PP)
	1–7	53:04 – Slepyshev (Karnaukhov)

12 min
Penalties
8 min
11
Shots
42

=== Czech Republic vs Switzerland ===
22 May 2021; 20:15	Czech Republic	2–5 (1–1, 0–2, 1–2)	Switzerland	Olympic Sports Centre, Riga

Game reference

Šimon Hrubec
Roman Will
Goalies
Leonardo Genoni
Referees:
(Latvia) Andris Ansons
(Finland) Kristian Vikman
Linesmen:
(Finland) Lauri Nikulainen
(Finland) Hannu Sormunen

Chytil (Kovář, Vrána) (PP) – 14:46	1–0
	1–1	17:09 – Hofmann (Ambühl, Simion) (PP)
	1–2	24:12 – Meier (Hischier) (PP)
	1–3	38:19 – Scherwey (Praplan, Bertschy)
	1–4	50:27 – Meier (Corvi, Kurashev) (PP)
Smejkal (Chytil, Sklenička) (PP) – 54:59	2–4
	2–5	57:08 – Hofmann (Simion, Ambühl) (PP)

14 min
Penalties
6 min
26
Shots
28

=== Great Britain vs Slovakia ===
23 May 2021; 12:15	Great Britain	1–2 (0–1, 1–1, 0–0)	Slovakia	Olympic Sports Centre, Riga

Game reference

Ben Bowns
Goalies
Branislav Konrád
Július Hudáček
Referees:
(Czech Republic) Martin Fraňo
(Canada) Oliver Gouin
Linesmen:
(France) Nicolas Constantineau
(United States) Brian Oliver

	0–1	00:25 – Hrivík (Lantoši)
Kirk (Perlini, Richardson) – 22:03	1–1
	1–2	24:42 – Lantoši (Cehlárik)

4 min
Penalties
4 min
14
Shots
43

=== Sweden vs Belarus ===
23 May 2021; 16:15	Sweden	0–1 (0–0, 0–0, 0–1)	Belarus	Olympic Sports Centre, Riga

Game reference
Adam Reideborn	Goalies	Danny Taylor	Referees: (Finland) Lassi Heikkinen (Finland) Kristian Vikman; Linesmen: (Finland) Lauri Nikulainen (Latvia) Dāvis Zunde
0–1 / 40:33 – Nesterov (Stefanovich, Lopachuk)			Referees: (Finland) Lassi Heikkinen (Finland) Kristian Vikman; Linesmen: (Finland) Lauri Nikulainen (Latvia) Dāvis Zunde
4 min	Penalties	8 min	Referees: (Finland) Lassi Heikkinen (Finland) Kristian Vikman; Linesmen: (Finland) Lauri Nikulainen (Latvia) Dāvis Zunde
32	Shots	22	Referees: (Finland) Lassi Heikkinen (Finland) Kristian Vikman; Linesmen: (Finland) Lauri Nikulainen (Latvia) Dāvis Zunde

=== Denmark vs Switzerland ===
23 May 2021; 20:15	Denmark	0–1 (0–1, 0–0, 0–0)	Switzerland	Olympic Sports Centre, Riga

Game reference
Sebastian Dahm	Goalies	Reto Berra	Referees: (Czech Republic) Robin Šír (Slovakia) Peter Stano; Linesmen: (Czech Republic) Jiří Ondráček (Czech Republic) Daniel Hynek
0–1 / 13:12 – Meier (Hischier, Müller)			Referees: (Czech Republic) Robin Šír (Slovakia) Peter Stano; Linesmen: (Czech Republic) Jiří Ondráček (Czech Republic) Daniel Hynek
2 min	Penalties	4 min	Referees: (Czech Republic) Robin Šír (Slovakia) Peter Stano; Linesmen: (Czech Republic) Jiří Ondráček (Czech Republic) Daniel Hynek
4	Shots	30	Referees: (Czech Republic) Robin Šír (Slovakia) Peter Stano; Linesmen: (Czech Republic) Jiří Ondráček (Czech Republic) Daniel Hynek

=== Slovakia vs ROC ===
24 May 2021; 16:15	Slovakia	3–1 (0–0, 1–1, 2–0)	ROC	Olympic Sports Centre, Riga

Game reference

Július Hudáček
Goalies
Alexander Samonov
Referees:
(Latvia) Andris Ansons
(Finland) Kristian Vikman
Linesmen:
(Finland) Lauri Nikulainen
(Finland) Hannu Sormunen

Kelemen (Roman) – 30:00	1–0
	1–1	31:06 – Barabanov (Tolchinsky, Slepyshev) (PP)
Gernát (Hrivík, Cehlárik) (PP) – 53:19	2–1
Ďaloga (Cehlárik, Hrivík) (EN) – 58:59	3–1

4 min
Penalties
6 min
28
Shots
28

=== Czech Republic vs Belarus ===
24 May 2021; 20:15	Czech Republic	3–2 OT (0–0, 2–1, 0–1) (OT: 1–0)	Belarus	Olympic Sports Centre, Riga

Game reference

Šimon Hrubec
Goalies
Alexei Kolosov
Referees:
(Sweden) Tobias Björk
(Denmark) Mads Frandsen
Linesmen:
(Sweden) Ludvig Lundgren
(Sweden) Emil Yletyinen

	0–1	25:52 – Sharangovich (Kostitsyn)
Kovář (Hronek, Moravčík) – 29:44	1–1
Zadina (Hronek) (PP) – 33:03	2–1
	2–2	51:30 – Yeryomenko (Lopachuk, Shinkevich)
Kubalík (Hanzl, Hrubec) (PP) – 61:23	3–2

4 min
Penalties
4 min
38
Shots
23

=== Great Britain vs Denmark ===
25 May 2021; 16:15	Great Britain	2–3 OT (1–2, 0–0, 1–0) (OT: 0–1)	Denmark	Olympic Sports Centre, Riga

Game reference

Ben Bowns
Goalies
Sebastian Dahm
Referees:
(Austria) Christoph Sternat
(Switzerland) Michael Tscherrig
Linesmen:
(Germany) Jonas Merten
(Switzerland) David Obwegeser

O'Connor (Phillips, Dowd) – 02:33	1–0
	1–1	10:19 – Jakobsen (Nick. Jensen, Bødker)
	1–2	13:44 – Nick. Jensen (M. Lauridsen, Bødker) (PP)
Hammond (Lake) – 56:18	2–2
	2–3	64:35 – M. Lauridsen (Nick. Jensen) (PP)

12 min
Penalties
6 min
23
Shots
32

=== Switzerland vs Sweden ===
25 May 2021; 20:15	Switzerland	0–7 (0–2, 0–2, 0–3)	Sweden	Olympic Sports Centre, Riga

Game reference

Leonardo Genoni
Melvin Nyffeler
Goalies
Adam Reideborn
Referees:
(Russia) Roman Gofman
(Belarus) Maxim Sidorenko
Linesmen:
(Belarus) Dmitri Golyak
(Russia) Nikita Shalagin

0–1	08:35 – Frödén (Pilut, Nygren)
0–2	10:00 – A. Kempe (Tömmernes, Lundkvist)
0–3	22:33 – Olofsson (Lundkvist) (PP)
0–4	30:24 – Frödén (Wingerli, Dahlbeck)
0–5	41:18 – Nygren (Rakell, A. Kempe) (PP)
0–6	47:14 – Rasmussen (Lundkvist, A. Kempe)
0–7	50:46 – Tömmernes (Frödén, Lundkvist)

14 min
Penalties
10 min
28
Shots
27

=== ROC vs Denmark ===
26 May 2021; 16:15	ROC	3–0 (0–0, 1–0, 2–0)	Denmark	Olympic Sports Centre, Riga

Game reference

Alexander Samonov
Goalies
Sebastian Dahm
Referees:
(Sweden) Tobias Björk
(Sweden) Mikael Nord
Linesmen:
(Sweden) Ludvig Lundgren
(Sweden) Emil Yletyinen

Morozov (Voronkov, Burdasov) (PP) – 39:18	1–0
Barabanov – 49:41	2–0
Voronkov (Morozov) – 56:35	3–0

4 min
Penalties
8 min
31
Shots
18

=== Belarus vs Great Britain ===
26 May 2021; 20:15	Belarus	3–4 (0–1, 1–2, 2–1)	Great Britain	Olympic Sports Centre, Riga

Game reference

Danny Taylor
Goalies
Ben Bowns
Referees:
(Czech Republic) Robin Šír
(Slovakia) Peter Stano
Linesmen:
(Czech Republic) Jiří Ondráček
(Slovakia) Šimon Synek

	0–1	13:38 – Kirk
Kodola (Bailen, Prince) – 29:15	1–1
	1–2	37:06 – Davies (Myers)
	1–3	38:35 – Kirk (O'Connor, Dowd)
	1–4	48:41 – Hammond (Richardson)
Platt (Paré, Kodola) – 51:19	2–4
Prince (Sharangovich, Protas) – 57:43	3–4

6 min
Penalties
4 min
36
Shots
26

=== Switzerland vs Slovakia ===
27 May 2021; 16:15	Switzerland	8–1 (1–0, 3–0, 4–1)	Slovakia	Olympic Sports Centre, Riga

Game reference

Reto Berra
Goalies
Július Hudáček
Referees:
(Czech Republic) Martin Fraňo
(Canada) Oliver Gouin
Linesmen:
(France) Nicolas Constantineau
(United States) Brian Oliver

Diaz (Hofmann, Andrighetto) (PP) – 09:47	1–0
Andrighetto (Diaz, Hofmann) (PP) – 20:25	2–0
Loeffel (Scherwey, Bertschy) – 25:17	3–0
Hofmann (Corvi, Loeffel) – 36:11	4–0
Meier (Alatalo, Kurashev) (PP) – 40:38	5–0
Kurashev (Untersander, Ambühl) – 44:34	6–0
	6–1	45:12 – Krištof (Cehlárik)
Hofmann (Ambühl, Andrighetto) (PP) – 52:39	7–1
Loeffel (Moser, Bertschy) (PP) – 54:03	8–1

8 min
Penalties
60 min
28
Shots
24

=== Sweden vs Czech Republic ===
27 May 2021; 20:15	Sweden	2–4 (2–0, 0–0, 0–4)	Czech Republic	Olympic Sports Centre, Riga

Game reference

Adam Reideborn
Goalies
Šimon Hrubec
Referees:
(Russia) Roman Gofman
(Russia) Yevgeni Romasko
Linesmen:
(Russia) Gleb Lazarev
(Russia) Nikita Shalagin

Wingerli (Friberg) – 12:08	1–0
Rakell (A. Kempe, Nygren) (PP) – 15:02	2–0
	2–1	41:10 – Vrána (Stránský) (PP)
	2–2	44:53 – Kovář (Sekáč, Kubalík) (PP)
	2–3	48:17 – Klok (Kovář)
	2–4	58:26 – Flek (Kubalík) (EN)

10 min
Penalties
10 min
29
Shots
24

=== Sweden vs Great Britain ===
28 May 2021; 16:15	Sweden	4–1 (1–1, 2–0, 1–0)	Great Britain	Olympic Sports Centre, Riga

Game reference

Viktor Fasth
Goalies
Ben Bowns
Referees:
(Latvia) Andris Ansons
(Finland) Kristian Vikman
Linesmen:
(Finland) Lauri Nikulainen
(Latvia) Dāvis Zunde

	0–1	07:20 – Kirk (Phillips)
Sörensen (Olofsson, Tömmernes) (PP) – 15:18	1–1
Pudas (Pilut, Wingerli) – 27:00	2–1
M. Kempe (Sörensen) – 32:08	3–1
M. Kempe (Sörensen) – 52:34	4–1

0 min
Penalties
8 min
56
Shots
14

=== Denmark vs Belarus ===
28 May 2021; 20:15	Denmark	5–2 (1–1, 0–1, 4–0)	Belarus	Olympic Sports Centre, Riga

Game reference

Sebastian Dahm
Goalies
Alexei Kolosov
Referees:
(Germany) André Schrader
(Austria) Christoph Sternat
Linesmen:
(Switzerland) David Obwegeser
(Austria) Elias Seewald

	0–1	02:12 – Demkov (Kodola, Korobov)
Meyer (M. Lauridsen) (PP) – 05:29	1–1
	1–2	30:20 – Stefanovich (Falkovsky, Protas) (PP)
Asperup (From, Jesper B. Jensen) – 44:58	2–2
From (True) – 47:48	3–2
M. Lauridsen (Hardt, Lassen) – 49:53	4–2
True (Lassen, Hardt) – 52:15	5–2

6 min
Penalties
29 min
37
Shots
18

=== Czech Republic vs Great Britain ===
29 May 2021; 12:15	Czech Republic	6–1 (1–0, 3–1, 2–0)	Great Britain	Olympic Sports Centre, Riga

Game reference

Roman Will
Goalies
Jackson Whistle
Ben Bowns
Referees:
(Denmark) Mads Frandsen
(Sweden) Mikael Nord
Linesmen:
(Denmark) Andreas Krøyer
(Sweden) Ludvig Lundgren

Klok (Špaček) – 08:01	1–0
Hronek (Zadina) – 20:33	2–0
Šulák (Špaček, Sekáč) – 24:29	3–0
Chytil (D. Musil) – 32:07	4–0
	4–1	39:37 – Myers (Richardson, Kirk) (PP)
Lenc (Hanzl) – 51:33	5–1
Šulák (Hanzl, Klok) – 57:58	6–1

6 min
Penalties
16 min
46
Shots
19

=== Switzerland vs ROC ===
29 May 2021; 16:15	Switzerland	1–4 (0–0, 0–1, 1–3)	ROC	Olympic Sports Centre, Riga

Game reference

Reto Berra
Goalies
Alexander Samonov
Referees:
(United States) Andrew Bruggeman
(Canada) Oliver Gouin
Linesmen:
(France) Nicolas Constantineau
(Canada) Dustin McCrank

	0–1	35:01 – Burdasov (Galimov) (PP)
Hischier (Ambühl) – 48:12	1–1
	1–2	50:26 – Karnaukhov (Tolchinsky, Barabanov)
	1–3	52:38 – Tolchinsky (Slepyshev, Provorov)
	1–4	59:58 – Tolchinsky (Barabanov, Karnaukhov) (ENG)

2 min
Penalties
4 min
23
Shots
26

=== Slovakia vs Denmark ===
29 May 2021; 20:15	Slovakia	2–0 (0–0, 0–0, 2–0)	Denmark	Olympic Sports Centre, Riga

Game reference
Július Hudáček	Goalies	Sebastien Dahm	Referees: (Latvia) Andris Ansons (Finland) Lassi Heikkinen; Linesmen: (Finland) Hannu Sormunen (Latvia) Dāvis Zunde
Cehlárik (Hrivík, Lantoši) – 47:13 / 1–0; Jánošík (Lantoši, Hrivík) – 52:25 / 2–0			Referees: (Latvia) Andris Ansons (Finland) Lassi Heikkinen; Linesmen: (Finland) Hannu Sormunen (Latvia) Dāvis Zunde
6 min	Penalties	2 min	Referees: (Latvia) Andris Ansons (Finland) Lassi Heikkinen; Linesmen: (Finland) Hannu Sormunen (Latvia) Dāvis Zunde
34	Shots	24	Referees: (Latvia) Andris Ansons (Finland) Lassi Heikkinen; Linesmen: (Finland) Hannu Sormunen (Latvia) Dāvis Zunde

=== Belarus vs Switzerland ===
30 May 2021; 16:15	Belarus	0–6 (0–2, 0–2, 0–2)	Switzerland	Olympic Sports Centre, Riga

Game reference

Konstantin Shoshtak
Alexei Kolosov
Goalies
Leonardo Genoni
Referees:
(Sweden) Tobias Björk
(Sweden) Mikael Nord
Linesmen:
(Denmark) Andreas Krøyer
(Sweden) Emil Yletyinen

0–1	00:36 – Bertschy (Herzog, Scherwey)
0–2	18:01 – Vermin (Meier)
0–3	21:09 – Andrighetto (Vermin)
0–4	32:15 – Hofmann (Corvi)
0–5	52:03 – Vermin (Meier)
0–6	57:43 – Herzog (Hischier) (SH)

18 min
Penalties
18 min
20
Shots
42

=== Sweden vs Slovakia ===
30 May 2021; 20:15	Sweden	3–1 (0–1, 1–0, 2–0)	Slovakia	Olympic Sports Centre, Riga

Game reference

Adam Reideborn
Goalies
Adam Húska
Referees:
(Germany) André Schrader
(Switzerland) Michael Tscherrig
Linesmen:
(Switzerland) David Obwegeser
(Austria) Elias Seewald

	0–1	19:07 – Cehlárik
Sörensen (Friberg) – 30:15	1–1
Olofsson (Tömmernes) (PP) – 51:38	2–1
Lundeström (Hållander) (SH, EN) – 59:47	3–1

10 min
Penalties
6 min
29
Shots
30

=== Czech Republic vs Denmark ===
31 May 2021; 16:15	Czech Republic	2–1 GWS (0–1, 0–0, 1–0) (OT: 0–0) (SO: 1–0)	Denmark	Olympic Sports Centre, Riga

Game reference
Šimon Hrubec	Goalies	Sebastian Dahm	Referees: (Russia) Roman Gofman (Russia) Yevgeni Romasko; Linesmen: (Russia) Gleb Lazarev (Russia) Nikita Shalagin
/ 0–1 / 03:41 – Nick. Jensen (M. Lauridsen, Meyer) (PP); Kubalík (Chytil, Vrána) – 45:23 / 1–1			Referees: (Russia) Roman Gofman (Russia) Yevgeni Romasko; Linesmen: (Russia) Gleb Lazarev (Russia) Nikita Shalagin
Hanzl; Vrána; Kovář; Chytil	Shootout	(miss) Meyer; Bau Hansen; Nick. Jensen; True; (miss) Andersen	Referees: (Russia) Roman Gofman (Russia) Yevgeni Romasko; Linesmen: (Russia) Gleb Lazarev (Russia) Nikita Shalagin
4 min	Penalties	8 min	Referees: (Russia) Roman Gofman (Russia) Yevgeni Romasko; Linesmen: (Russia) Gleb Lazarev (Russia) Nikita Shalagin
39	Shots	13	Referees: (Russia) Roman Gofman (Russia) Yevgeni Romasko; Linesmen: (Russia) Gleb Lazarev (Russia) Nikita Shalagin

=== ROC vs Sweden ===
31 May 2021; 20:15	ROC	3–2 GWS (0–1, 0–0, 2–1) (OT: 0–0) (SO: 1–0)	Sweden	Olympic Sports Centre, Riga

Game reference

Alexander Samonov
Goalies
Adam Reideborn
Referees:
(United States) Andrew Bruggeman
(Canada) Oliver Gouin
Linesmen:
(France) Nicolas Constantineau
(United States) Brian Oliver

	0–1	08:06 – Frödén (Lindberg, A. Kempe) (PP)
Slepyshev (Orlov) – 52:34	1–1
Barabanov (Tarasenko, Nesterov) – 52:46	2–1
	2–2	55:17 – Olofsson (Sellgren, Lundeström)

Slepyshev (miss)
Morozov
Burdasov
Tolchinsky (miss)
Tarasenko
Shootout
(miss) Rakell
(miss) Olofsson
A. Kempe
Pudas
(miss) Sörensen
10 min
Penalties
4 min
27
Shots
30

=== Switzerland vs Great Britain ===
1 June 2021; 12:15	Switzerland	6–3 (2–1, 4–1, 0–1)	Great Britain	Olympic Sports Centre, Riga

Game reference

Reto Berra
Melvin Nyffeler
Goalies
Ben Bowns
Jackson Whistle
Referees:
(Czech Republic) Martin Fraňo
(Czech Republic) Robin Šír
Linesmen:
(Czech Republic) Daniel Hynek
(Czech Republic) Jiří Ondráček

Hofmann (Corvi, Moser) – 10:31	1–0
	1–1	11:08 – Kirk
Loeffel (Scherwey, Siegenthaler) – 16:42	2–1
	2–2	25:34 – Kirk (Richardson, Hammond) (PP)
Alatalo (Corvi, Hischier) (PP) – 30:07	3–2
Bertschy (Scherwey) – 30:20	4–2
Bertschy (Diaz, Scherwey) – 36:09	5–2
Hischier (Kurashev) – 37:45	6–2
	6–3	53:58 – Connolly (Kirk, Hammond)

16 min
Penalties
8 min
53
Shots
26

=== Slovakia vs Czech Republic ===
1 June 2021; 16:15	Slovakia	3–7 (0–2, 1–2, 2–3)	Czech Republic	Olympic Sports Centre, Riga

Game reference

Július Hudáček
Adam Húska
Goalies
Roman Will
Referees:
(United States) Andrew Bruggeman
(Canada) Oliver Gouin
Linesmen:
(France) Nicolas Constantineau
(United States) Brian Oliver

	0–1	00:29 – Zadina (Hájek, Moravčík)
	0–2	15:04 – Špaček (Zadina)
	0–3	22:49 – Radil (Šustr, Šulák)
Sukeľ (Faško-Rudáš) – 26:53	1–3
	1–4	39:49 – Šulák (Špaček) (PP)
	1–5	43:31 – Stránský
	1–6	45:47 – Blümel (Stránský, Moravčík
Bučko (Holešinský, Buc) – 48:45	2–6
Pospíšil (Cehlárik, Gachulinec) – 58:57	3–6
	3–7	59:43 – Hájek (Hanzl, Smejkal) (EN)

6 min
Penalties
6 min
25
Shots
28

=== ROC vs Belarus ===
1 June 2021; 20:15	ROC	6–0 (5–0, 0–0, 1–0)	Belarus	Olympic Sports Centre, Riga

Game reference

Alexander Samonov
Goalies
Konstantin Shostak
Alexei Kolosov
Referees:
(Germany) André Schrader
(Austria) Christoph Sternat
Linesmen:
(Germany) Jonas Merten
(Austria) Elias Seewald

Nesterov (Grigorenko) – 00:36	1–0
Galimov (Gavrikov) – 04:29	2–0
Shalunov (Zadorov, Nesterov) – 09:06	3–0
Grigorenko (Slepyshev, Voronkov) – 10:52	4–0
Nesterov (Tarasenko, Barabanov) – 16:28	5–0
Voronkov (Slepyshev, Grigorenko) – 52:08	6–0

6 min
Penalties
12 min
32
Shots
19
