= Dmitri Znakharenko =

- Born: 4 August 1993 (age 32) Gomel, Belarus
- Height: 5 ft 11 in (180 cm)
- Weight: 205 lb (93 kg; 14 st 9 lb)
- Position: Defence
- Shoots: Left
- KHL team Former teams: Free Agent; Dinamo Minsk; Amur Khabarovsk
- National team: Belarus
- NHL draft: Undrafted
- Playing career: 2012–present

Dmitri Znakharenko (born 4 August 1993) is a Belarusian professional ice hockey player currently an unrestricted free agent. He most recently played for Amur Khabarovsk in the Kontinental Hockey League (KHL) and the Belarusian national team.

== Playing career ==
Following his sixth season in the KHL with HC Dinamo Minsk, Znakharenko left as a free agent to sign a one-year deal with Amur Khabarovsk on 11 June 2021.

== International play ==
He represented Belarus at the 2021 IIHF World Championship.
