= Yegor Sharangovich =

Belarusian ice hockey player (born 1998)

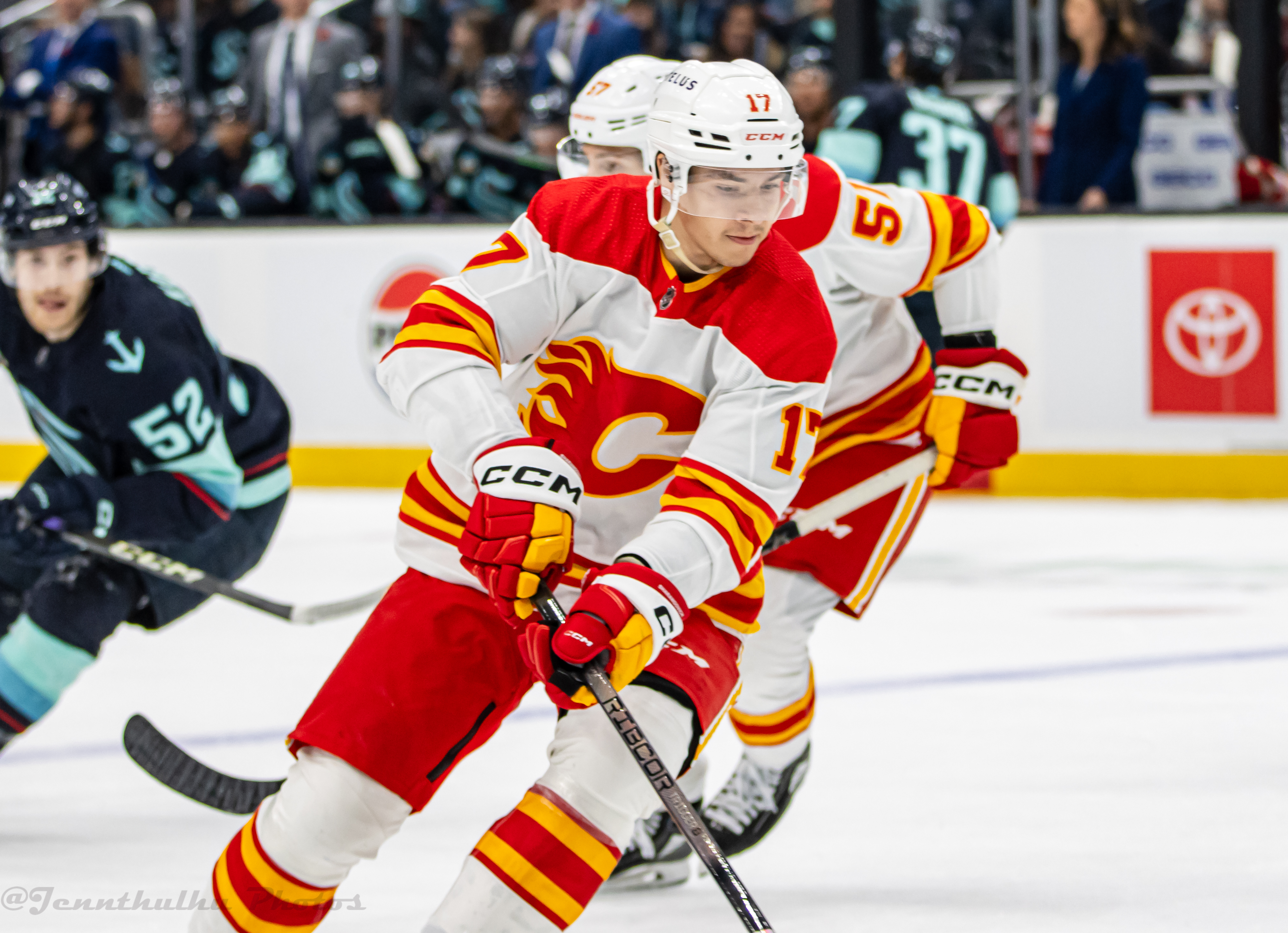
- Sharangovich with the Calgary Flames in 2023.
- Born: 6 June 1998 (age 28) Minsk, Belarus
- Height: 6 ft 2 in (188 cm)
- Weight: 196 lb (89 kg; 14 st 0 lb)
- Position: Forward
- Shoots: Left
- NHL team Former teams: Calgary Flames; HC Dinamo Minsk; New Jersey Devils
- National team: Belarus
- NHL draft: 141st overall, 2018; New Jersey Devils
- Playing career: 2014–present

Yegor Alexandrovich Sharangovich (Belarusian: Ягор Аляксандравіч Шаранговіч, romanized: Jahor Alaksandravič Šaranhovič, Russian: Егор Александрович Шарангович; born 6 June 1998) is a Belarusian professional ice hockey player who is a forward for the Calgary Flames of the National Hockey League (NHL). He was drafted by the New Jersey Devils, 141st overall, in the 2018 NHL entry draft, and made his NHL debut in 2020. Prior to joining the Devils Sharangovich played two seasons with Dinamo Minsk of the Kontinental Hockey League, as well as two seasons in the American Hockey League. Internationally Sharangovich has played for the Belarusian national team at both the junior and senior level, including four World Championships.

== Playing career ==
=== Early years ===
Sharangovich played as a youth in his native Belarus, with Dinamo-Raubichi Minsk at the under-20 level and also the second tier Vysshaya Liga as an affiliate to top Belarusian club, HC Dinamo Minsk of the Kontinental Hockey League (KHL). His development was noticed in North America, as he was drafted 252nd overall by the Youngstown Phantoms of the 2017 USHL Entry Draft.

Opting to remain in Belarus, Sharangovich made his debut with Dinamo Minsk during the 2017–18 season appearing in 47 games as a rookie, collecting 4 goals and 12 points. After being passed over in previous drafts, Sharangovich was selected as an overage pick by the New Jersey Devils in the fifth-round, 141st overall, of the 2018 NHL entry draft.

=== North America and COVID season ===
Following the NHL draft, Sharangovich agreed to a three-year, entry-level contract with the Devils on 19 July 2018. After participating in the Devils training camp, Sharangovich was reassigned to their American Hockey League (AHL) affiliate, the Binghamton Devils, to start the 2018–19 season. Upon joining the Devils, he scored his first North American professional goal on 10 October 2018 against the Hartford Wolf Pack. Sharangovich continued to improve throughout the season and quickly tallied eight goals and five assists through 36 games while also playing on the Devils penalty kill unit.

With the 2020–21 season to be delayed due to the COVID-19 pandemic, on 16 July 2020, Sharangovich opted to return to Dinamo Minsk on loan from the Devils, and play in the KHL until the resumption of the North American season. Returning to the Devils on the commencement of the season, on 16 January 2021, Sharangovich scored his first NHL goal against the Boston Bruins' Jaroslav Halák. The goal was the overtime winner in a 2–1 Devils win.

During the 2021–22 season, on April 2, 2022, Sharangovich scored his first hat trick against the Florida Panthers.

At the completion of his entry-level contract with the Devils, Sharangovich as a restricted free agent, was traded along with 2023 third-round draft pick to the Calgary Flames in exchange for Tyler Toffoli on 27 June 2023. He was promptly signed to a two-year, $6.2 million contract extension with the Flames the following day on 28 June. On July 1, 2024, Sharangovich was re-signed to a five-year, $28.75 million contract extension with the Flames.

== International play ==
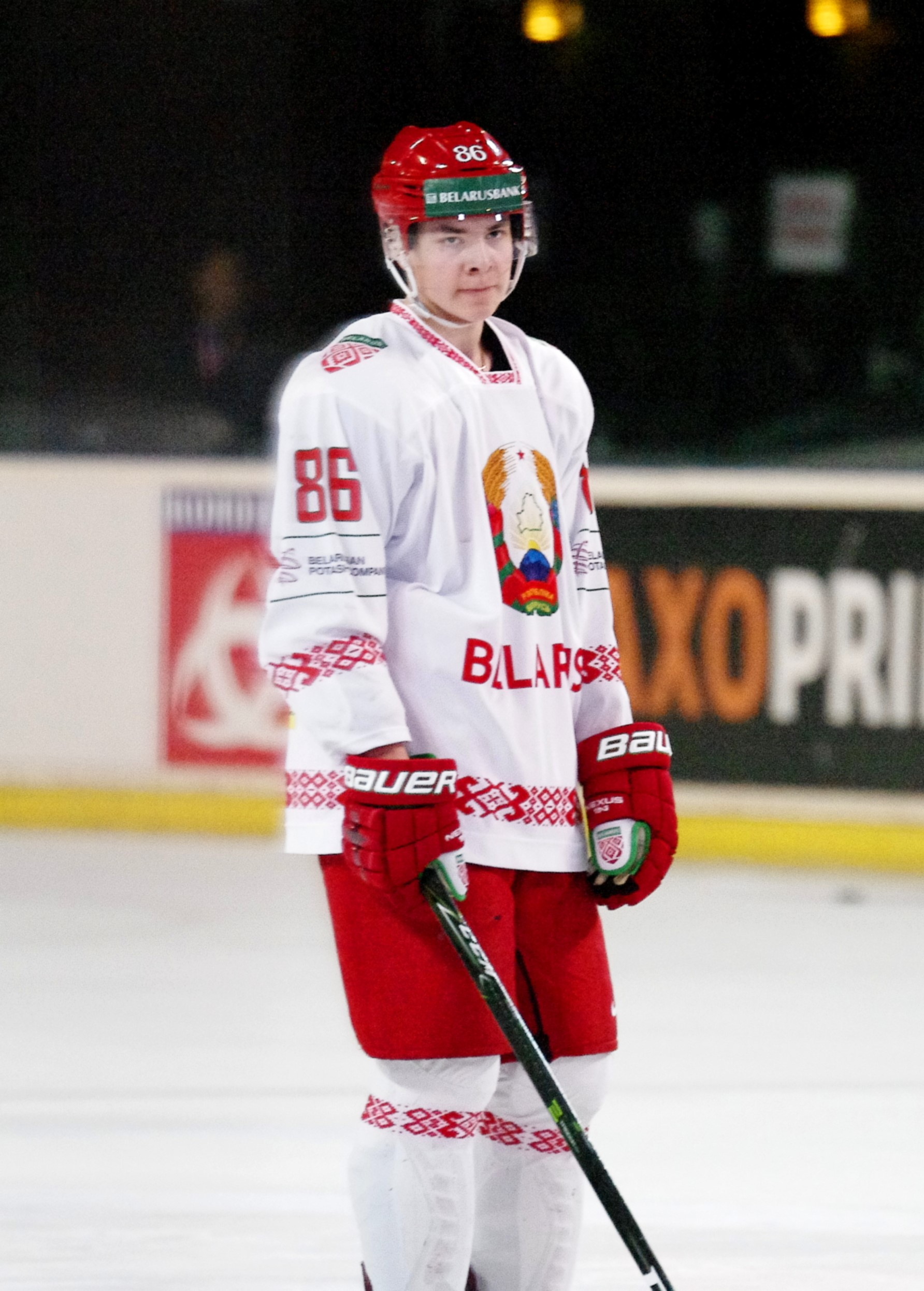
Sharangovich with Belarus in 2017

Sharangovich has played internationally at the junior and senior level for the Belarusian national team, which he currently captains. He participated at the 2017 IIHF World Championship and later the 2018 IIHF World Championship.

== Career statistics ==
=== Regular season and playoffs ===
			Regular season					Playoffs
Season	Team	League	GP	G	A	Pts	PIM	GP	G	A	Pts	PIM
2014–15	Dinamo-Raubichi Minsk	BLR.2	40	28	15	43	12	3	1	0	1	4
2015–16	Dinamo-Raubichi Minsk	MHL	30	6	6	12	12	—	—	—	—	—
2015–16	Dinamo-Raubichi Minsk	BLR.2	—	—	—	—	—	10	3	3	6	10
2016–17	Belarus U20	BXL	38	15	13	28	18	2	0	0	0	0
2017–18	HC Dinamo Minsk	KHL	47	4	8	12	12	—	—	—	—	—
2018–19	Binghamton Devils	AHL	68	9	8	17	14	—	—	—	—	—
2019–20	Binghamton Devils	AHL	57	10	15	25	4	—	—	—	—	—
2020–21	HC Dinamo Minsk	KHL	34	17	8	25	41	—	—	—	—	—
2020–21	New Jersey Devils	NHL	54	16	14	30	4	—	—	—	—	—
2021–22	New Jersey Devils	NHL	76	24	22	46	23	—	—	—	—	—
2022–23	New Jersey Devils	NHL	75	13	17	30	16	3	0	0	0	0
2023–24	Calgary Flames	NHL	82	31	28	59	8	—	—	—	—	—
2024–25	Calgary Flames	NHL	73	17	15	32	8	—	—	—	—	—
2025–26	Calgary Flames	NHL	78	15	14	29	12	—	—	—	—	—
KHL totals			81	21	16	37	53	—	—	—	—	—
NHL totals			438	116	110	226	71	3	0	0	0	0

=== International ===
Year	Team	Event	GP	G	A	Pts	PIM
2015	Belarus	U18-D1	5	4	2	6	0
2016	Belarus	U18-D1	5	2	0	2	0
2016	Belarus	WJC	6	1	0	1	0
2017	Belarus	WJC-D1	5	0	2	2	2
2017	Belarus	WC	7	2	1	3	0
2018	Belarus	WJC	6	3	2	5	0
2018	Belarus	WC	7	0	1	1	6
2019	Belarus	WC-D1	5	1	0	1	0
2021	Belarus	WC	7	2	1	3	4
2021	Belarus	OGQ	3	3	0	3	2
Junior totals			27	10	6	16	2
Senior totals			29	8	3	11	12
