= Artyom Shvets-Rogovoy =

Russian ice hockey player

- Born: 3 March 1995 (age 31) Saratov, Russia
- Height: 6 ft 2 in (188 cm)
- Weight: 185 lb (84 kg; 13 st 3 lb)
- Position: Centre
- Shoots: Left
- KHL team Former teams: Dynamo Moscow; HC Vityaz; SKA Saint Petersburg
- National team: Russia
- Playing career: 2014–present

Artyom Ilyich Shvets-Rogovoy (Russian: Артём Ильчи Швец-Роговой; born March 3, 1995) is a Russian ice hockey forward currently playing for HC Dynamo Moscow of the Kontinental Hockey League (KHL).

After four seasons with SKA Saint Petersburg, Shvets-Rogovoy left as a free agent at the conclusion of the 2023–24 campaign and joined fellow contending club, Dynamo Moscow, on a two-year contract on 20 May 2024.

== Career statistics ==
=== Regular season and playoffs ===
			Regular season					Playoffs
Season	Team	League	GP	G	A	Pts	PIM	GP	G	A	Pts	PIM
2012–13	Russkie Vityazi Chekhov	MHL	56	4	13	17	30	—	—	—	—	—
2013–14	Russkie Vityazi Chekhov	MHL	49	12	11	23	58	3	0	0	0	0
2014–15	Russkie Vityazi Chekhov	MHL	40	18	25	43	118	3	0	1	2	2
2014–15	HC Vityaz	KHL	11	0	0	0	6	—	—	—	—	—
2015–16	Russkie Vityazi Chekhov	MHL	4	1	2	3	4	—	—	—	—	—
2015–16	HC Vityaz	KHL	38	0	6	6	28	—	—	—	—	—
2015–16	THK Tver	VHL	2	0	0	0	0	11	1	2	3	15
2016–17	THK Tver	VHL	21	5	3	8	44	—	—	—	—	—
2016–17	HC Vityaz	KHL	28	1	9	10	13	4	1	0	1	4
2017–18	HC Vityaz	KHL	56	8	13	21	21	—	—	—	—	—
2018–19	HC Vityaz	KHL	61	13	12	25	42	4	1	1	2	2
2019–20	HC Vityaz	KHL	12	3	3	6	4	—	—	—	—	—
2019–20	SKA Saint Petersburg	KHL	19	0	1	1	6	1	0	0	0	0
2020–21	SKA Saint Petersburg	KHL	29	1	9	10	17	15	2	2	4	9
2021–22	SKA Saint Petersburg	KHL	11	1	3	4	4	7	1	0	1	2
2023–24	SKA Saint Petersburg	KHL	5	0	1	1	0	—	—	—	—	—
2023–24	SKA-Neva	VHL	7	0	1	1	2	3	0	0	0	2
2024–25	Dynamo Moscow	KHL	42	6	6	12	10	14	3	0	3	8
2025–26	Dynamo Moscow	KHL	64	11	6	17	24	4	0	1	1	2
KHL totals			376	44	69	113	175	49	8	4	12	27

=== International ===
Year	Team	Event	Result	GP	G	A	Pts	PIM
2021	ROC	WC	5th	8	1	0	1	4
Senior totals				8	1	0	1	4
