= Stanislav Lopachuk =

Belarusian ice hockey player

- Born: 16 February 1992 (age 33); Minsk, Belarus
- Height: 1.80 m (5 ft 11 in)
- Weight: 78 kg (172 lb; 12 st 4 lb)
- Position: Centre/Right wing
- Shoots: Left
- BHL team Former teams: Yunost Minsk; Dinamo Minsk; Neman Grodno; Dinamo-Molodechno; Neftyanik Almetyevsk; Dizel Penza
- National team: Belarus
- NHL draft: Undrafted
- Playing career: 2009–present

Stanislav Lopachuk (born 16 February 1992) is a Belarusian ice hockey player for Yunost Minsk and the Belarusian national team.

He represented Belarus at the 2021 IIHF World Championship.
