= Nick Bailen =

American-Belarusian ice hockey player

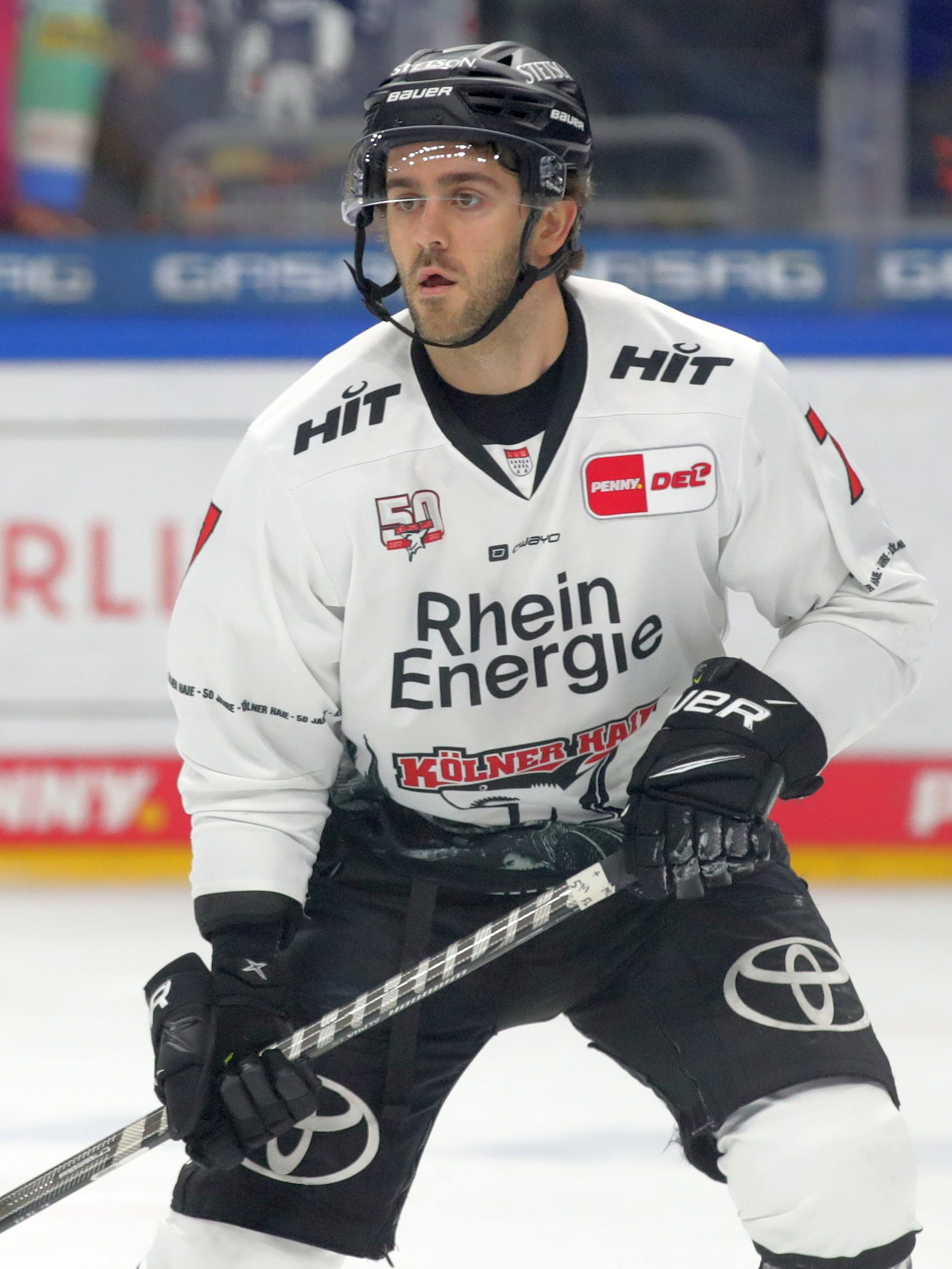
- Bailen in 2023
- Born: December 12, 1989 (age 35); Fredonia, New York, U.S.
- Height: 5 ft 9 in (175 cm)
- Weight: 179 lb (81 kg; 12 st 11 lb)
- Position: Defense
- Shoots: Left
- DEL team Former teams: Kölner Haie; Rochester Americans; Tappara; HC Dinamo Minsk; Växjö Lakers; Traktor Chelyabinsk
- National team: Belarus
- NHL draft: Undrafted
- Playing career: 2013–present

Nick Bailen (born December 12, 1989) is an American-Belarusian professional ice hockey defensemen. He is currently playing for Kölner Haie of the Deutsche Eishockey Liga (DEL).

== Playing career ==
Undrafted, Bailen played collegiate for RPI Engineers men's ice hockey of ECAC Hockey, an NCAA Men's Division I Ice Hockey conference that compete in NCAA Division I ice hockey. After a short stint with the Rochester Americans of the American Hockey League in 2013, Bailen took his game overseas, spending the 2013–14 season with Tappara of the Finnish top-flight Liiga.

His next stop was Belarusian club, HC Dinamo Minsk of the KHL, where he played from 2014 to December 2016. On December 21, 2016, he was released to contract with the Växjö Lakers of the Swedish Hockey League.

Bailen returned to the KHL for the following 2017–18 season, after an initial try-out, he secured a two-year deal with Russian club, Traktor Chelyabinsk on September 5, 2017.

Following his fifth season with Traktor Chelyabinsk in 2021–22, on July 27, 2022, Bailen was mutually released from the remaining season of his contract with Traktor to hold his KHL rights for three seasons. Bailen left the club as the franchise leader among defenseman and third overall in scoring with 48 goals and 156 points in 254 games.

On July 31, 2022, Bailen moved to Germany after signing a one-year contract with Kölner Haie of the DEL for the 2022–23 season.

== International play ==
On December 1, 2014 he received Belarusian citizenship. Under IIHF rules on nationality, Bailen was eligible to join the Belarusian national team. He received his first cap in 2016.

== Career statistics ==
=== Regular season and playoffs ===
			Regular season					Playoffs
Season	Team	League	GP	G	A	Pts	PIM	GP	G	A	Pts	PIM
2005–06	Indiana Ice	USHL	52	1	7	8	73	5	0	0	0	12
2006–07	Indiana Ice	USHL	53	4	9	13	93	7	0	0	0	14
2007–08	Indiana Ice	USHL	58	8	13	21	157	4	1	1	2	0
2008–09	Bowling Green State U.	CCHA	37	6	10	16	56	—	—	—	—	—
2009–10	Indiana Ice	USHL	58	14	27	41	97	9	0	4	4	6
2010–11	R.P.I.	ECAC	38	8	28	36	34	—	—	—	—	—
2011–12	R.P.I.	ECAC	39	7	15	22	24	—	—	—	—	—
2012–13	R.P.I.	ECAC	35	12	19	31	18	—	—	—	—	—
2012–13	Rochester Americans	AHL	9	0	3	3	0	3	0	0	0	0
2013–14	Tappara	Liiga	54	11	21	32	26	17	4	8	12	49
2013–14	LeKi	Mestis	1	0	1	1	0	—	—	—	—	—
2014–15	Dinamo Minsk	KHL	60	11	26	37	49	5	1	2	3	10
2015–16	Dinamo Minsk	KHL	40	6	25	31	34	—	—	—	—	—
2016–17	Dinamo Minsk	KHL	13	4	5	9	2	—	—	—	—	—
2016–17	Växjö Lakers	SHL	20	4	10	14	12	6	0	2	2	2
2017–18	Traktor Chelyabinsk	KHL	56	11	19	30	41	16	3	7	10	38
2018–19	Traktor Chelyabinsk	KHL	62	7	17	24	39	4	0	0	0	6
2019–20	Traktor Chelyabinsk	KHL	36	11	14	25	20	—	—	—	—	—
2020–21	Traktor Chelyabinsk	KHL	51	13	22	35	24	5	1	0	1	0
2021–22	Traktor Chelyabinsk	KHL	49	6	36	42	53	15	4	4	8	27
2022–23	Kölner Haie	DEL	56	19	26	45	29	6	1	4	5	8
2023–24	Kölner Haie	DEL	34	4	20	24	20	3	0	2	2	0
Liiga totals			54	11	21	32	26	17	4	8	12	49
KHL totals			367	69	164	233	262	45	9	13	22	81

=== International ===
Year	Team	Event	Result	GP	G	A	Pts	PIM
2016	Belarus	OGQ	NQ	3	1	2	3	0
2019	Belarus	WC-D1	18th	5	0	2	2	4
2021	Belarus	WC	15th	6	0	1	1	4
2021	Belarus	OGQ	NQ	3	0	1	1	0
Senior totals				17	1	6	7	8

== Awards and honors ==
Award	Year
USHL
All-Star Game	2010
College
All-ECAC Hockey First Team	2011, 2013
AHCA East Second-Team All-American	2011
ECAC All-Academic Team	2011
AHCA East First-Team All-American	2012–13
Liiga
All-Star Team	2014
KHL
All-Star Game	2015
