= Konstantin Shostak =

Belarusian ice hockey player

- Shostak playing for Belarus in 2023
- Born: 28 March 2000 (age 26) Minsk, Belarus
- Height: 5 ft 10 in (178 cm)
- Weight: 183 lb (83 kg; 13 st 1 lb)
- Position: Goaltender
- Catches: Left
- KHL team Former teams: Free agent Severstal Cherepovets; JYP; Dinamo Minsk
- National team: Belarus
- Playing career: 2017–present

Konstantin Dmitriyevich Shostak (Russian: Константин Дмитриевич Шостак; born 28 March 2000) is a Belarusian professional ice hockey player who is currently an unrestricted free agent. He most recently played for Severstal Cherepovets in the Kontinental Hockey League (KHL), and the Belarusian national team. He has also formerly played with JYP in the Liiga.

Shostak joined Dinamo Minsk on loan from Severstal for the 2022–23 season on 1 June 2022. He represented Belarus at the 2021 IIHF World Championship.
