= Dmitry Korobov =

Belarusian ice hockey player (born 1989)

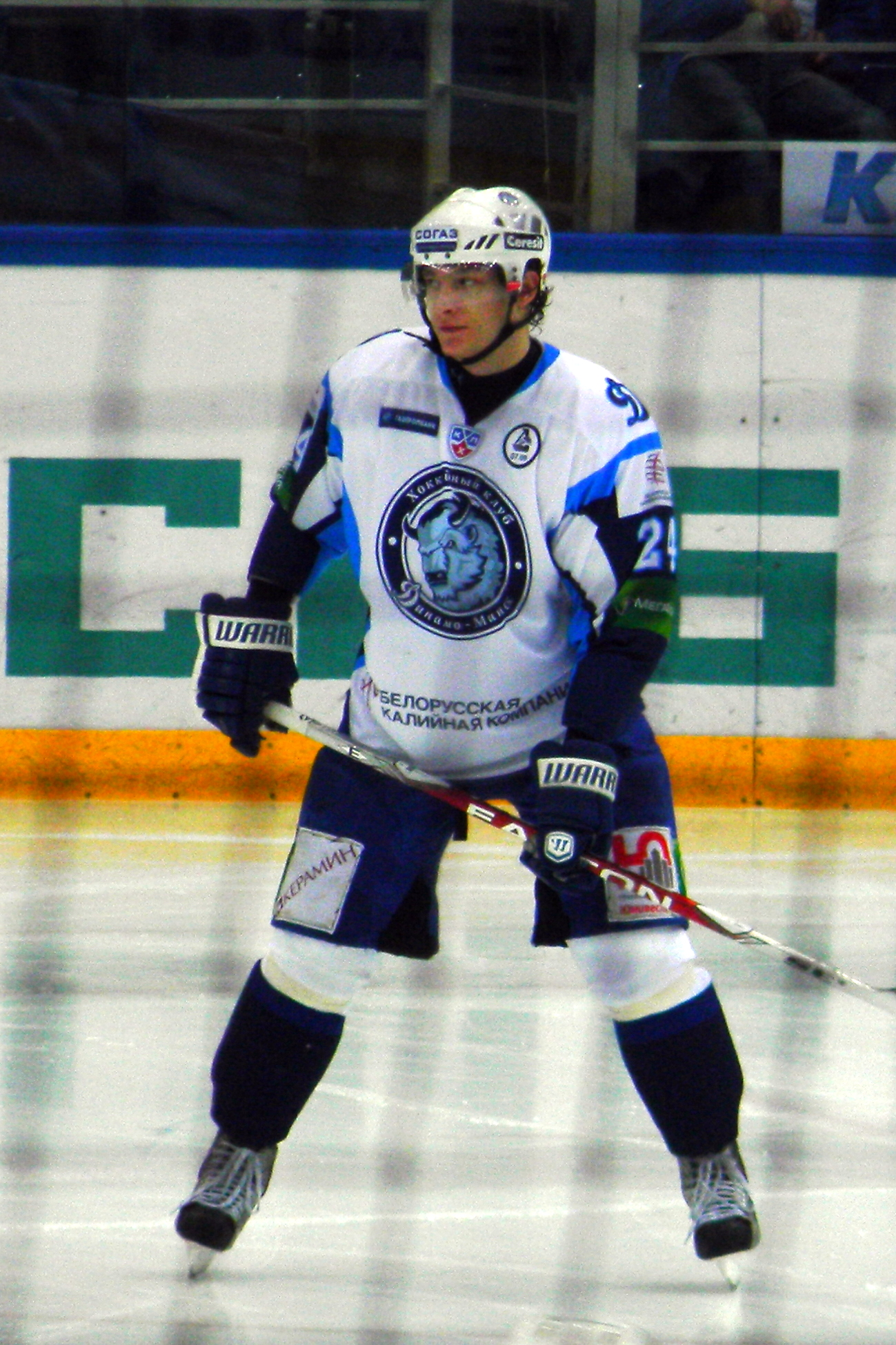
- Born: 12 March 1989 (age 37) Navapolatsk, Belarusian SSR, URS
- Height: 6 ft 3 in (191 cm)
- Weight: 229 lb (104 kg; 16 st 5 lb)
- Position: Defence
- Shoots: Left
- KHL team Former teams: Dinamo Minsk; Tampa Bay Lightning; Atlant Moscow Oblast; Spartak Moscow; Torpedo Nizhny Novgorod; Amur Khabarovsk; Salavat Yulaev Ufa
- National team: Belarus
- NHL draft: Undrafted
- Playing career: 2006–present

Dmitri Nikolaievich Korobov (Belarusian: Дзмітрый Мікалаевіч Корабаў; born 12 March 1989), is a Belarusian professional ice hockey defenceman for HC Dinamo Minsk of the Kontinental Hockey League (KHL).

== Playing career ==
After coming up through the ranks with his native Gomel and later HC Dinamo Minsk Korobov was signed to a two-year entry-level deal with the Tampa Bay Lightning on 2 August 2012. In the final year of his contract with the Lightning, Korobov was recalled from American Hockey League affiliate, the Syracuse Crunch, and made his NHL debut, featuring in 3 games in the 2013–14 season.

On 1 July 2014, Korobov opted to return to the KHL as a free agent, signing a two-year contract with Atlant Moscow Oblast.

After playing a further two seasons with Dinamo Minsk, Korobov left the club for the third time in his career, agreeing to a two-year deal with Russian club, Torpedo Nizhny Novgorod beginning from the 2018–19 season, on July 14, 2018.

Korobov left Torpedo after just one season, opting to continue his career in the KHL with Amur Khabarovsk for the 2019–20 season on 4 August 2019. Korobov played in 29 regular season games with Amur, collecting just 2 goals, before he was hampered by injury.

As a free agent, Korobov continued his tenure in the KHL, agreeing to a one-year contract with Salavat Yulaev Ufa on 2 May 2020.

== International play ==
He has represented Belarus at the 2009 and 2011 IIHF World Championships.

== Career statistics ==
=== Regular season and playoffs ===
			Regular season					Playoffs
Season	Team	League	GP	G	A	Pts	PIM	GP	G	A	Pts	PIM
2006–07	HK Gomel	BEL	41	3	5	8	20	5	1	0	1	4
2007–08	HK Gomel	BEL	47	3	7	10	36	—	—	—	—	—
2008–09	Shinnik Bobruisk	BEL	24	1	10	11	32	—	—	—	—	—
2008–09	Keramin Minsk	BEL	1	0	1	1	0	—	—	—	—	—
2008–09	HC Dinamo Minsk	KHL	12	0	2	2	6	—	—	—	—	—
2009–10	HC Shakhter Soligorsk	BEL	4	0	0	0	4	—	—	—	—	—
2010–11	HC Dinamo Minsk	KHL	31	1	6	7	24	6	1	2	3	10
2011–12	HC Dinamo Minsk	KHL	39	1	10	11	16	3	0	0	0	2
2011–12	HK Gomel	BEL	2	0	0	0	0	—	—	—	—	—
2012–13	Syracuse Crunch	AHL	65	3	19	22	34	17	1	1	2	9
2013–14	Syracuse Crunch	AHL	71	3	23	26	64	—	—	—	—	—
2013–14	Tampa Bay Lightning	NHL	3	0	1	1	2	—	—	—	—	—
2014–15	Atlant Moscow Oblast	KHL	46	1	8	9	53	—	—	—	—	—
2015–16	Spartak Moscow	KHL	50	3	10	13	40	—	—	—	—	—
2016–17	HC Dinamo Minsk	KHL	33	2	3	5	49	5	1	2	3	14
2017–18	HC Dinamo Minsk	KHL	54	2	9	11	66	—	—	—	—	—
2018–19	Torpedo Nizhny Novgorod	KHL	39	1	7	8	20	—	—	—	—	—
2019–20	Amur Khabarovsk	KHL	29	2	0	2	12	—	—	—	—	—
2020–21	Salavat Yulaev Ufa	KHL	35	0	7	7	8	1	0	0	0	0
2021–22	HC Dinamo Minsk	KHL	45	3	2	5	26	4	0	0	0	2
2022–23	HC Dinamo Minsk	KHL	49	3	4	7	16	4	0	0	0	0
2022–23	Metallurg Zhlobin	BEL	—	—	—	—	—	12	0	5	5	16
2023–24	HC Dinamo Minsk	KHL	54	2	3	5	24	3	1	1	2	0
KHL totals			516	21	71	92	360	26	3	5	8	28
NHL totals			3	0	1	1	2	—	—	—	—	—

=== International ===
Year	Team	Event	Result	GP	G	A	Pts	PIM
2006	Belarus	WJC18	9th	6	2	0	2	6
2007	Belarus	WJC18-D1	12th	5	0	2	2	6
2007	Belarus	WJC	10th	6	0	0	0	10
2008	Belarus	WJC-D1	14th	5	1	1	2	8
2009	Belarus	WJC-D1	13th	5	1	2	3	0
2009	Belarus	WC	8th	3	0	0	0	0
2011	Belarus	WC	14th	6	2	3	5	0
2012	Belarus	WC	14th	7	0	3	3	4
2014	Belarus	WC	7th	8	0	3	3	14
2015	Belarus	WC	7th	8	1	1	2	2
2016	Belarus	WC	12th	5	1	0	1	4
2017	Belarus	WC	13th	7	0	0	0	4
2018	Belarus	WC	15th	7	0	1	1	2
2021	Belarus	WC	15th	5	0	1	1	2
2021	Belarus	OGQ	DNQ	3	0	0	0	0
Junior totals				27	4	5	9	30
Senior totals				59	4	12	16	32
