= Vladislav Kodola =

- Born: 30 October 1996 (age 29) Gomel, Belarus
- Height: 5 ft 9 in (175 cm)
- Weight: 176 lb (80 kg; 12 st 8 lb)
- Position: Centre
- Shoots: Left
- VHL team Former teams: Metallurg Novokuznetsk; Severstal Cherepovets; Dynamo Moscow; Dinamo Minsk; Barys Astana; Neftekhimik Nizhnekamsk; Torpedo Nizhny Novgorod
- National team: Belarus
- NHL draft: Undrafted
- Playing career: 2015–present

Vladislav Kodola (born 30 October 1996) is a Belarusian professional ice hockey player who is currently under contract with Metallurg Novokuznetsk in the Supreme Hockey League (VHL) and the Belarusian national team.

== Playing career ==
On 17 June 2022, Kodola left his original club, Severstal Cherepovets, after seven seasons as he was traded to HC Dynamo Moscow in exchange for Alexander Petunin.

Following a lone season with Dynamo Moscow in 2022–23, having contributed with 6 goals and 20 points through 53 regular season games, Kodola's KHL rights were traded and he agreed to a contract in returning to Belarus with HC Dinamo Minsk on 12 July 2023.

== International play ==
Kodola represented Belarus at the 2021 IIHF World Championship.
