= Danny Taylor (ice hockey) =

Canadian-Belarusian ice hockey goaltender

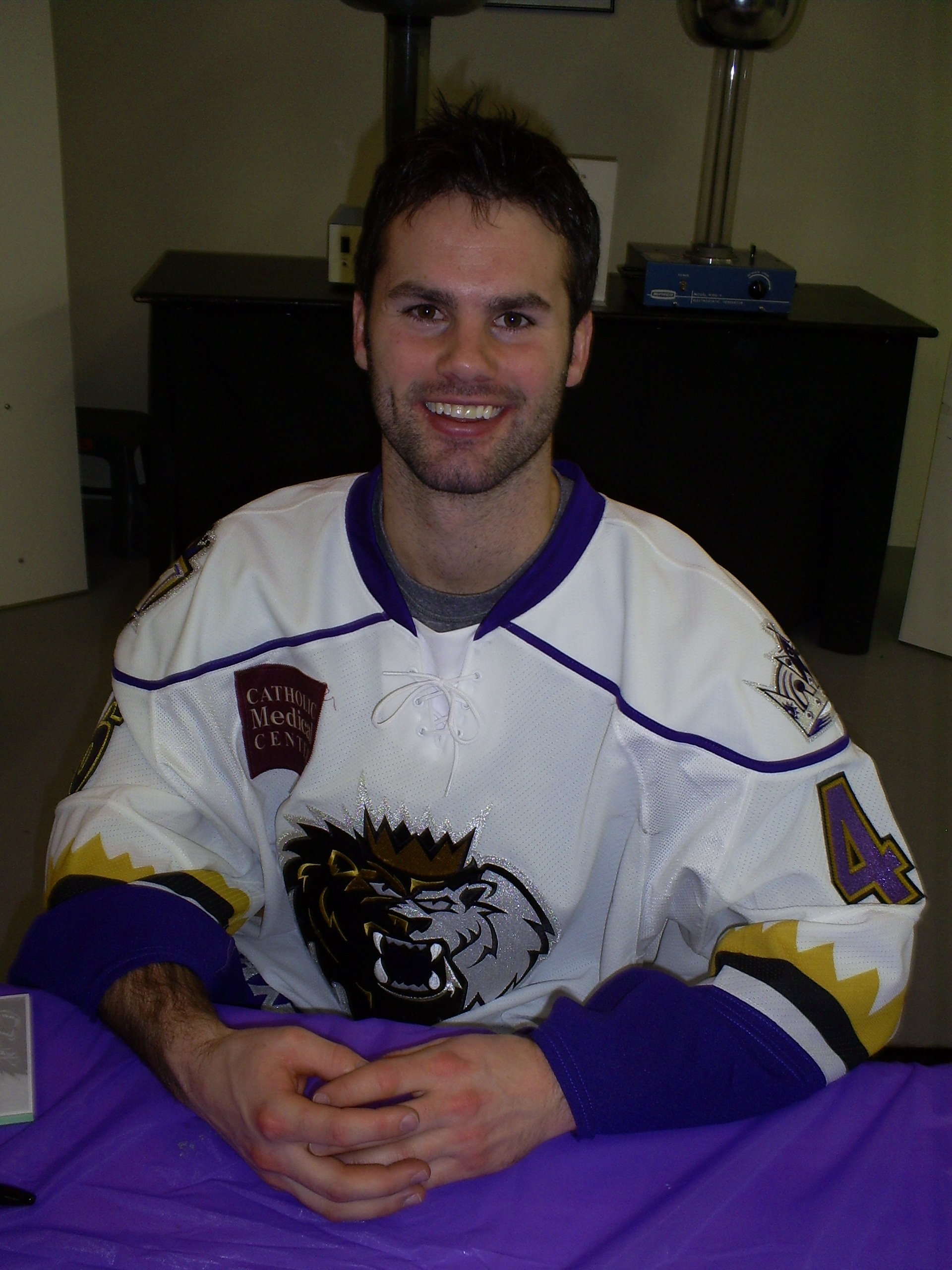
- Born: April 28, 1986 (age 40) York, England, United Kingdom
- Height: 6 ft 1 in (185 cm)
- Weight: 177 lb (80 kg; 12 st 9 lb)
- Position: Goaltender
- Caught: Left
- KHL team: Free Agent
- Played for: Los Angeles Kings; Hamburg Freezers; Calgary Flames; Färjestad BK; Dinamo Minsk; Medveščak Zagreb; HC Sparta Praha; Sibir Novosibirsk; Ottawa Senators
- National team: Belarus
- NHL draft: 221st overall, 2004; Los Angeles Kings
- Playing career: 2006–2022

Daniel Taylor (born April 28, 1986) is a Belarusian Canadian retired professional ice hockey goaltender. He was drafted in the seventh round (221st overall) of the 2004 NHL entry draft by the Los Angeles Kings and has appeared in four NHL games with the Kings, Calgary Flames, and Ottawa Senators.

Internationally Taylor played for the Belarusian national team at the 2021 World Championships.

== Playing career ==
The son of a British mother and Canadian father working for the British Army, Taylor moved with his family to the Ottawa suburb of Orleans, Ontario when he was two years old. He spent three seasons in the Ontario Hockey League playing for the Guelph Storm and Kingston Frontenacs before moving onto professional hockey. Taylor spent the majority of the 2007–08 season with the Manchester Monarchs of the AHL. He played in 23 games, posting a 13–5–2 record. He also had a 2.40 GAA, 0.921 save percentage and recorded four shut-outs. He earned a recall to the Kings, and made his NHL debut on March 29, 2008, in relief of starting goaltender Erik Ersberg. Taylor played the third period, giving up two goals in what was a 7–2 loss to the Dallas Stars. Taylor returned to the Monarchs for the 2008–09 season and played 15 games, recording a 7–4–2 record. That year he had a 2.66 GAA and a 0.909 save percentage.

For the 2009–10 season Taylor was signed to a professional try-out agreement by the Syracuse Crunch of the AHL. He played in nine games that year for the Crunch, posting a 2–4–0 record before he was released from the agreement. He also had a 3.63 GAA and 0.896 save percentage.

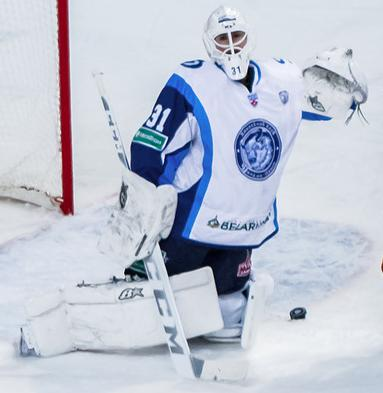
Taylor playing for HC Dinamo Minsk in 2014

The next year, Taylor signed with the Springfield Falcons. Taylor stayed with the team for the 2010–11 season and played in four games, having a 2–2–0 record. He had a 2.35 GAA and a 0.929 save percentage. He played the remainder of the season in Germany with the Hamburg Freezers. Taylor returned to the Falcons for the 2011–12 season. In ten games with Springfield he posted a 5–3–0 record with a 2.58 GAA and a .914 save percentage, but there was a crowded crease in Springfield with Taylor, Manny Legace, and Allen York, and Taylor was bounced out. But it did not take long for him to get signed as he was picked up by the Abbotsford Heat of the AHL.

On August 10, 2012, Taylor was extended by the Heat to a one-year contract for the 2012–13 season. He was among the AHL's goaltending leaders midway through the season with a second-best GAA of 1.77 and was fourth in save percentage at .930 when an injury to Calgary Flames' goaltender Miikka Kiprusoff led the Flames to sign Taylor to an NHL contract on February 6 and recall him to Calgary. He spent several days with the Flames, but was returned to Abbotsford without seeing action. However, he was again recalled to Calgary on February 16, replacing Leland Irving as the backup goaltender to Joey MacDonald.

Five years after his first NHL game, Taylor finally made his second appearance (and first NHL start) on February 18, 2013, against the Phoenix Coyotes. He made 37 saves, but the Flames lost the game 4–0. In his second start, on March 3, Taylor earned his first NHL victory with a 4–2 win over the Vancouver Canucks.

A free agent following the season, Taylor chose to go to Sweden. He signed a contract to play with Färjestad BK in the SHL for the 2013–14 season and helped the team reach the finals. He then spent the 2014–15 season with HC Dinamo Minsk of the Kontinental Hockey League (KHL), before joining fellow KHL side Medvescak Zagreb. In the course of the 2015–16 campaign, he was transferred to Czech outfit HC Sparta Praha.

On July 6, 2016, the Zagreb team announced that Taylor would return for the 2016–17 season. On October 20, 2016, he transferred to fellow KHL side HC Sibir Novosibirsk.

On July 1, 2017, Taylor returned to Canada as a free agent, in agreeing to a one-year, two-way contract with the Ottawa Senators. Taylor spent most of the season with Ottawa's American Hockey League affiliate in Belleville, but was called up three games before the end of the season and played in the final game of the season against the Boston Bruins.

On April 27, 2018, Taylor returned to Russia and signed with HC Sibir Novosibirsk of the KHL for whom he played before coming to the NHL. He moved to HC Dinamo Minsk after a brief tryout in 2019.

== International play ==
On January 26, 2021, the Belarus Ice Hockey Federation announced that Taylor as well as fellow Dynamo Minsk players Shane Prince and Francis Paré had accepted an offer to play for the Belarus men's national ice hockey team.

== Career statistics ==
=== Regular season and playoffs ===
			Regular season									Playoffs
Season	Team	League	GP	W	L	T/OT	MIN	GA	SO	GAA	SV%	GP	W	L	MIN	GA	SO	GAA	SV%
2003–04	Guelph Storm	OHL	26	16	4	3	1462	66	0	2.71	.900	3	1	1	159	9	0	3.40	.857
2004–05	Guelph Storm	OHL	31	13	14	3	1821	80	2	2.64	.911	1	0	1	59	4	0	4.07	.900
2005–06	Kingston Frontenacs	OHL	57	32	15	6	3319	172	3	3.11	.911	5	2	3	300	14	1	2.80	.918
2006–07	Bakersfield Condors	ECHL	17	7	7	2	969	70	0	4.33	.872	—	—	—	—	—	—	—	—
2006–07	Wheeling Nailers	ECHL	1	0	0	1	62	4	0	3.86	.833	—	—	—	—	—	—	—	—
2006–07	Texas Wildcatters	ECHL	2	0	1	0	74	2	0	1.61	.905	6	3	1	359	15	0	2.51	.917
2007–08	Manchester Monarchs	AHL	23	13	5	2	1275	51	4	2.40	.921	—	—	—	—	—	—	—	—
2007–08	Reading Royals	ECHL	5	3	0	0	182	8	0	2.63	.917	13	7	6	815	38	1	2.80	.906
2007–08	Los Angeles Kings	NHL	1	0	0	0	20	2	0	6.00	.800	—	—	—	—	—	—	—	—
2008–09	Reading Royals	ECHL	23	3	17	1	1257	83	0	3.96	.881	—	—	—	—	—	—	—	—
2008–09	Manchester Monarchs	AHL	15	7	4	2	744	33	0	2.66	.909	—	—	—	—	—	—	—	—
2009–10	Gwinnett Gladiators	ECHL	37	18	13	5	2181	126	1	3.47	.902	—	—	—	—	—	—	—	—
2009–10	Syracuse Crunch	AHL	9	2	4	0	397	24	0	3.63	.896	—	—	—	—	—	—	—	—
2010–11	Springfield Falcons	AHL	4	2	2	0	230	9	0	2.35	.929	—	—	—	—	—	—	—	—
2010–11	Hamburg Freezers	DEL	28	14	14	0	1678	81	1	2.90	.905	—	—	—	—	—	—	—	—
2011–12	Springfield Falcons	AHL	10	5	3	0	512	22	0	2.58	.914	—	—	—	—	—	—	—	—
2011–12	Abbotsford Heat	AHL	33	17	10	3	1815	67	5	2.21	.927	7	4	3	426	16	0	2.26	.917
2012–13	Abbotsford Heat	AHL	40	18	10	2	2108	72	3	2.05	.922	—	—	—	—	—	—	—	—
2012–13	Calgary Flames	NHL	2	1	1	0	120	6	0	3.00	.912	—	—	—	—	—	—	—	—
2013–14	Färjestad BK	SHL	16	4	11	0	958	37	0	2.32	.917	—	—	—	—	—	—	—	—
2014–15	Dinamo Minsk	KHL	19	11	6	2	1146	53	1	2.77	.904	—	—	—	—	—	—	—	—
2015–16	KHL Medveščak Zagreb	KHL	38	16	14	3	2079	79	3	2.28	.924	—	—	—	—	—	—	—	—
2015–16	HC Sparta Praha	ELH	7	6	1	0	374	16	0	2.57	.904	3	1	2	135	10	0	4.44	.833
2016–17	KHL Medveščak Zagreb	KHL	17	7	5	3	968	36	1	2.23	.930	—	—	—	—	—	—	—	—
2016–17	Sibir Novosibirsk	KHL	29	12	11	0	1540	45	5	1.75	.940	—	—	—	—	—	—	—	—
2017–18	Belleville Senators	AHL	32	11	15	3	1772	93	1	3.15	.900	—	—	—	—	—	—	—	—
2017–18	Ottawa Senators	NHL	1	0	1	0	59	4	0	4.14	.882	—	—	—	—	—	—	—	—
2018–19	Sibir Novosibirsk	KHL	33	9	20	1	1767	83	3	2.82	.914	—	—	—	—	—	—	—	—
2019–20	Dinamo Minsk	KHL	20	3	14	0	935	62	0	3.98	.867	—	—	—	—	—	—	—	—
2020–21	Dinamo Minsk	KHL	12	2	4	1	494	28	1	3.40	.877	—	—	—	—	—	—	—	—
2021–22	ERC Ingolstadt	DEL	17	7	9	0	985	46	1	2.80	.904	1	0	1	70	3	0	2.58	.889
NHL totals			4	1	2	0	199	12	0	3.63	.893	—	—	—	—	—	—	—	—
KHL totals			168	60	74	10	8,929	386	14	2.59	.914	—	—	—	—	—	—	—	—
