= Nikita Komarov =

Belarusian ice hockey player

- Born: June 28, 1988 (age 36); Novopolotsk, Belarusian SSR, Soviet Union
- Height: 6 ft 2 in (188 cm)
- Weight: 220 lb (100 kg; 15 st 10 lb)
- Position: Forward
- Shot: Left
- Played for: Khimik-SKA Novopolotsk; HK Vitebsk; Metallurg Zhlobin; Avtomobilist Yekaterinburg; Dinamo Minsk; Dynamo Moscow; HC Vityaz; Traktor Chelyabinsk; Avangard Omsk; SKA Saint Petersburg; HC Sochi
- National team: Belarus
- Playing career: 2007–2023

Nikita Komarov (born June 28, 1988) is a Belarusian former professional ice hockey player who played in the Kontinental Hockey League (KHL) and the Belarusian national team. He formerly signed a one-year deal with HC Dynamo Moscow after a successful trial period on August 19, 2017.

On 15 July 2020, Komarov joined Avangard Omsk, signing a one-year contract as a free agent for the 2020–21 season.

He participated at the 2016 IIHF World Championship.

== Awards and honours ==
Award	Year
KHL
Gagarin Cup (Avangard Omsk)	2021
