= Ilya Shinkevich =

Belarusian ice hockey player

- Born: 1 September 1989 (age 35); Minsk, Belarusian SSR, URS
- Height: 6 ft 2 in (188 cm)
- Weight: 183 lb (83 kg; 13 st 1 lb)
- Position: Defense
- Shoots: Left
- KAZ team Former teams: Shakhter Soligorsk; Dinamo Minsk; HC Vityaz
- National team: Belarus
- Playing career: 2007–present

Ilya Shinkevich (born 1 September 1989) is a Belarusian professional ice hockey player who is currently playing for Shakhter Soligorsk in the Kazakhstan Hockey Championship (KAZ). He has previously played in the Kontinental Hockey League (KHL) with HC Dinamo Minsk and Russian entrant, HC Vityaz.

Shinkevich competed in the 2013 IIHF World Championship as a member of the Belarus men's national ice hockey team.
