= Belarus men's national ice hockey team =

Men's national ice hockey team representing Belarus

Belarus
- Nickname: Bisons (Зубры / Zubry)
- Association: Belarusian Ice Hockey Association
- Head coach: Craig Woodcroft
- Assistants: Dmitri Karpikov; Mikhail Kravets; Vladimir Vorobiev
- Captain: Yegor Sharangovich
- Most games: Oleg Romanov (193)
- Top scorer: Oleg Antonenko (52)
- Most points: Alexei Kalyuzhny (125)
- Team colors
- IIHF code: BLR
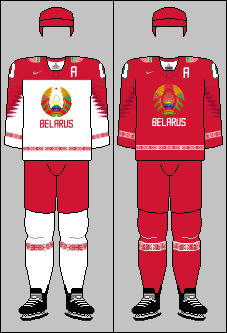

Ranking
- Current IIHF: NR (3 June 2026)
- Highest IIHF: 8 (2009)
- Lowest IIHF: 16 (2024–2025)

First international
- Ukraine 4–1 Belarus (Minsk, Belarus; 7 November 1992)

Biggest win
- Belarus 21–1 Lithuania (Riga, Latvia; 30 August 1996)

Biggest defeat
- Finland 11–2 Belarus (Mikkeli, Finland; 7 April 1997); Canada 11–2 Belarus (Lloydminster, Canada; 19 March 1998); Canada 9–0 Belarus (Prague, Czech Republic; 14 May 2015)

Olympics
- Appearances: 3 (first in 1998)

IIHF World Championships
- Appearances: 27 (first in 1994)
- Best result: 6th (2006)

International record (W–L–T)
- 253–238–25

The Belarus men's national ice hockey team (Belarusian: Зборная Беларусі па хакеі з шайбай; Russian: Сборная Беларуси по хоккею с шайбой) is the national ice hockey team that represents Belarus. The team is controlled by the Belarusian Ice Hockey Association. Belarus was ranked 14th in the world by the International Ice Hockey Federation (IIHF) as of the 2021 world ranking.

The team achieved their best result at the Winter Olympics in the quarterfinals of the 2002 Winter Olympics where they defeated Sweden and finished fourth. At the 2005 and 2006 World Championships their coach was Glen Hanlon, who led them to sixth place at the 2006 IIHF World Championship. He was succeeded by Curt Fraser, who led the team in 2007 and 2008. Hanlon returned to coach at the 2009 World Championships in Switzerland.

Due to the Russian invasion of Ukraine, the International Ice Hockey Federation banned all Belarus national and club teams from its events indefinitely, and Hockey Canada banned Belarus from "participation in events held in Canada that do not fall under the IIHF's jurisdiction". Despite the ban, Belarus participated in the 2023 Channel One Cup, alongside Russia and Kazakhstan.

== Tournament record ==
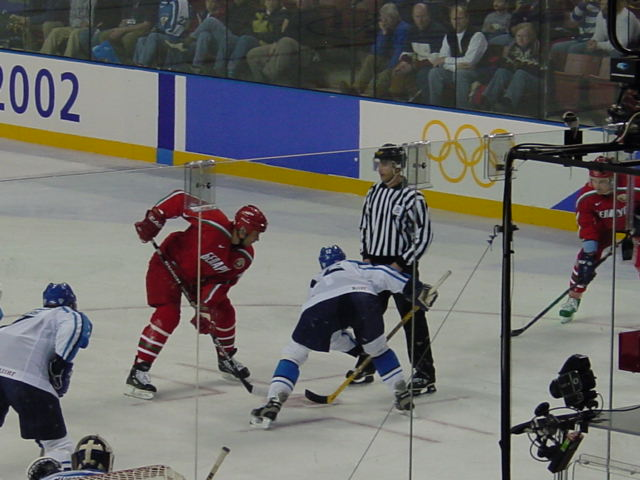
Finland vs. Belarus at the 2002 Winter Olympics.

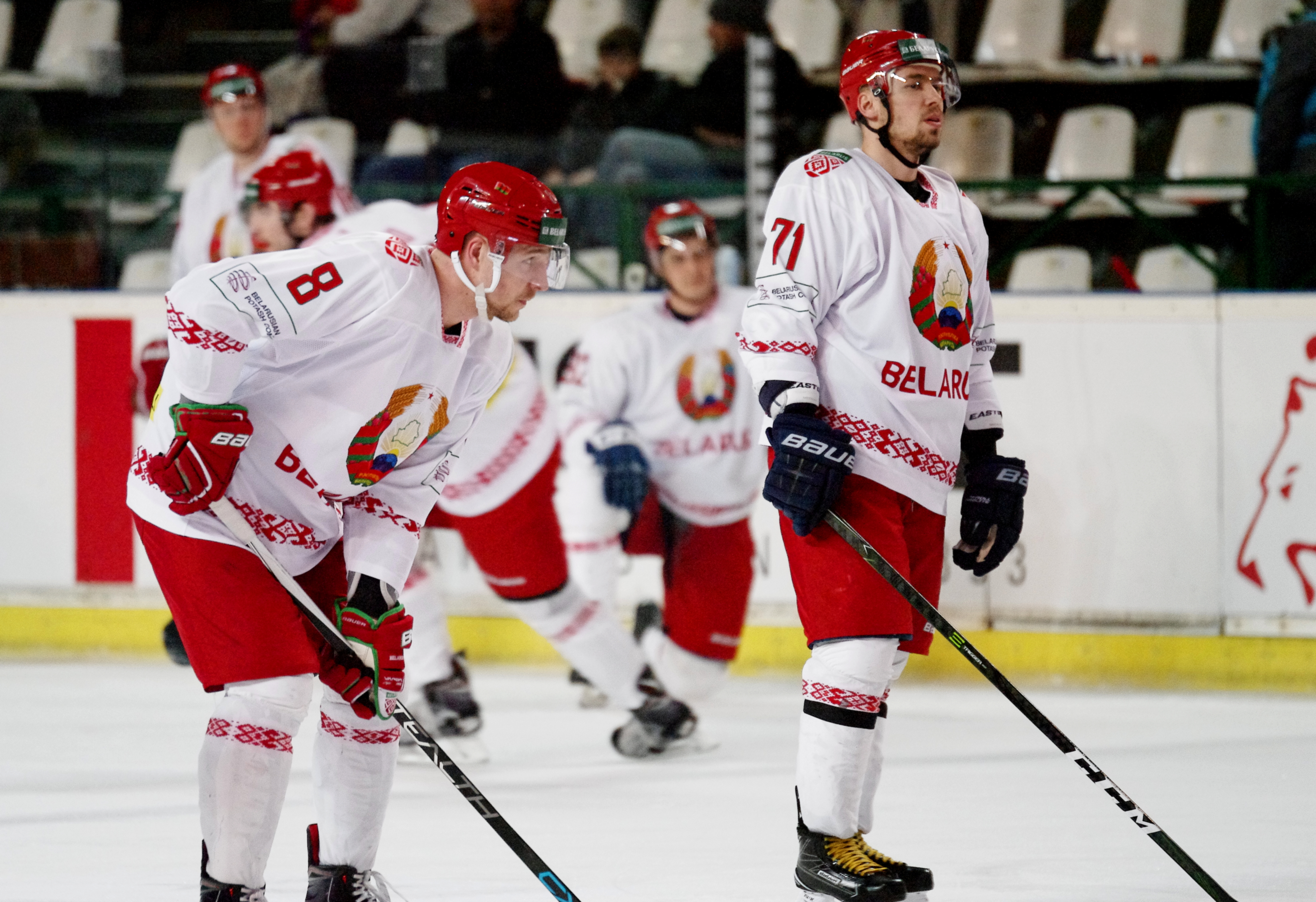
Belarusian players in 2017.

=== Olympic Games ===
Games	GP	W	OTW	OTL	L	GF	GA	Place
1920–1988	Part of the Soviet Union							
1992	Part of the Unified Team							
1994	Did not enter							
(Japan) Nagano 1998	4	0	0	0	4	5	19	7th
(United States) Salt Lake City 2002	6	1	0	0	5	13	39	4th
2006	Did not qualify							
(Canada) Vancouver 2010	4	1	0	1	2	10	15	9th
2014–2022	Did not qualify							
2026	Banned							

=== World Championship ===
Year	Location	Result
1954 – 1991	As part of Soviet Union	
1993	Minsk, Belarus	Qualifying round for the Group C (3rd in Group 2)
1994	Poprad / Spišská Nová Ves, Slovakia	22nd place (2nd in Group C1)
1995	Sofia, Bulgaria	21st place (1st in Group C1, promoted)
1996	Eindhoven, Netherlands	15th place (3rd in Group B)
1997	Katowice / Sosnowiec, Poland	13th place (1st in Group B, promoted)
1998	Zürich / Basel, Switzerland	8th place
1999	Oslo / Lillehammer / Hamar, Norway	9th place
2000	Saint Petersburg, Russia	9th place
2001	Cologne / Hanover / Nuremberg, Germany	14th place (relegated)
2002	Eindhoven, Netherlands	17th place (1st in D1A, promoted)
2003	Helsinki / Tampere / Turku, Finland	14th place (relegated)
2004	Oslo, Norway	18th place (1st in D1A, promoted)
2005	Innsbruck / Vienna, Austria	10th place
2006	Riga, Latvia	6th place
2007	Moscow / Mytishchi, Russia	11th place
2008	Quebec City / Halifax, Canada	9th place
2009	Bern / Kloten, Switzerland	8th place
2010	Cologne / Mannheim / Gelsenkirchen, Germany	10th place
2011	Bratislava / Košice, Slovakia	14th place
2012	Helsinki / Stockholm, Finland / Sweden	14th place
2013	Stockholm / Helsinki, Sweden / Finland	14th place
2014	Minsk, Belarus	7th place
2015	Prague / Ostrava, Czech Republic	7th place
2016	Moscow / Saint Petersburg, Russia	12th place
2017	Cologne / Paris, Germany / France	13th place
2018	Copenhagen / Herning, Denmark	15th place (relegated)
2019	Nur-Sultan, Kazakhstan	18th place (2nd in Division IA, promoted)
2020	Zürich / Lausanne, Switzerland	Cancelled due to the coronavirus pandemic
2021	Riga, Latvia	15th place
Expelled from IIHF World Championships since 2022 due to supporting the Russian invasion of Ukraine

== Team ==
=== Current roster ===
Roster for the 2021 IIHF World Championship.

Head coach: Mikhail Zakharov

No.	Pos.	Name	Height	Weight	Birthdate	Team
2	D	Ilya Solovyov	1.89 m (6 ft 2 in)	90 kg (200 lb)	20 July 2000 (age 26)	(Belarus) Dinamo Minsk
7	D	Stepan Falkovsky	2.05 m (6 ft 9 in)	112 kg (247 lb)	18 December 1996 (age 29)	(Belarus) Dinamo Minsk
8	D	Ilya Shinkevich	1.88 m (6 ft 2 in)	85 kg (187 lb)	1 September 1989 (age 36)	(Belarus) Dinamo Minsk
9	F	Stanislav Lopachuk	1.80 m (5 ft 11 in)	78 kg (172 lb)	16 February 1992 (age 34)	(Belarus) Yunost Minsk
10	D	Nick Bailen	1.74 m (5 ft 9 in)	81 kg (179 lb)	12 December 1989 (age 36)	(Russia) Traktor Chelyabinsk
12	F	Aliaksei Protas	1.98 m (6 ft 6 in)	97 kg (214 lb)	6 January 2001 (age 25)	(United States) Hershey Bears
13	F	Mikhail Stefanovich	1.90 m (6 ft 3 in)	95 kg (209 lb)	27 November 1989 (age 36)	(Ukraine) Donbass Donetsk
14	D	Yevgeni Lisovets	1.82 m (6 ft 0 in)	86 kg (190 lb)	12 November 1994 (age 31)	(Russia) Salavat Yulaev Ufa
15	F	Artem Demkov	1.74 m (5 ft 9 in)	80 kg (180 lb)	26 September 1989 (age 36)	(Belarus) Dinamo Minsk
16	F	Geoff Platt – A	1.76 m (5 ft 9 in)	80 kg (180 lb)	10 July 1985 (age 41)	(Russia) Salavat Yulaev Ufa
17	F	Yegor Sharangovich – C	1.87 m (6 ft 2 in)	92 kg (203 lb)	6 June 1998 (age 28)	(Canada) Calgary Flames
18	D	Kristian Khenkel – A	1.86 m (6 ft 1 in)	88 kg (194 lb)	7 November 1995 (age 30)	(Russia) Ak Bars Kazan
19	F	Nikita Komarov	1.88 m (6 ft 2 in)	92 kg (203 lb)	28 June 1988 (age 38)	(Russia) Avangard Omsk
21	F	Vladislav Kodola	1.76 m (5 ft 9 in)	80 kg (180 lb)	30 October 1996 (age 29)	(Russia) Severstal Cherepovets
22	F	Francis Paré	1.78 m (5 ft 10 in)	86 kg (190 lb)	30 June 1987 (age 39)	(Belarus) Dinamo Minsk
30	G	Konstantin Shostak	1.81 m (5 ft 11 in)	81 kg (179 lb)	28 March 2000 (age 26)	(Russia) Severstal Cherepovets
31	G	Danny Taylor	1.84 m (6 ft 0 in)	85 kg (187 lb)	28 April 1986 (age 40)	(Belarus) Dinamo Minsk
40	G	Aleksei Kolosov	1.86 m (6 ft 1 in)	85 kg (187 lb)	4 January 2002 (age 24)	(Belarus) Dinamo Minsk
73	D	Dmitri Znakharenko	1.82 m (6 ft 0 in)	91 kg (201 lb)	4 August 1993 (age 33)	(Belarus) Dinamo Minsk
74	F	Sergei Kostitsyn	1.83 m (6 ft 0 in)	88 kg (194 lb)	20 March 1987 (age 39)	(Slovakia) Bratislava Capitals
81	F	Sergei Drozd	1.82 m (6 ft 0 in)	79 kg (174 lb)	14 April 1990 (age 36)	(Belarus) Yunost Minsk
85	D	Andrei Antonov	1.78 m (5 ft 10 in)	85 kg (187 lb)	27 April 1985 (age 41)	(Belarus) Yunost Minsk
88	F	German Nesterov	1.90 m (6 ft 3 in)	95 kg (209 lb)	31 August 1991 (age 34)	(Belarus) HK Gomel
89	D	Dmitry Korobov	1.89 m (6 ft 2 in)	108 kg (238 lb)	12 March 1989 (age 37)	(Russia) Salavat Yulaev Ufa
90	F	Danila Klimovich	1.85 m (6 ft 1 in)	85 kg (187 lb)	9 January 2003 (age 23)	(Belarus) Minskie Zubry
92	F	Shane Prince	1.80 m (5 ft 11 in)	85 kg (187 lb)	16 November 1992 (age 33)	(Russia) Avtomobilist Yekaterinburg
93	F	Andrei Belevich	1.85 m (6 ft 1 in)	95 kg (209 lb)	27 August 1997 (age 28)	(Belarus) Dinamo Minsk
94	D	Vladislav Yeryomenko	1.84 m (6 ft 0 in)	90 kg (200 lb)	23 April 1999 (age 27)	(Belarus) Dinamo Minsk

=== Retired numbers ===
- 24 – Ruslan Salei

== All-time record ==
As of 3 May 2025.

Opponent	Played	Won	Drawn	Lost	GF	GA	GD
Austria	22	16	1	5	83	49	+34
Belgium	1	1	0	0	10	0	+10
Bulgaria	1	1	0	0	13	1	+12
Canada	19	1	1	17	27	111	-84
Croatia	3	3	0	0	20	3	+17
Czech Republic	17	1	0	16	21	72	−51
Denmark	29	14	2	13	90	72	+18
Estonia	3	3	0	0	31	4	+27
Finland	18	2	0	16	25	71	−46
France	32	22	1	9	101	59	+42
Germany	29	16	2	11	80	73	+7
Great Britain	6	4	0	2	32	17	+15
Hungary	15	13	1	1	75	27	+48
Italy	6	5	0	1	22	10	+12
Japan	7	5	1	1	27	14	+13
Kazakhstan	24	19	1	4	88	48	+40
Latvia	40	18	3	19	99	106	-7
Lithuania	4	4	0	0	35	7	+28
Netherlands	4	4	0	0	35	10	+25
Norway	39	23	4	12	114	91	+23
Poland	17	13	0	4	77	38	+39
Romania	1	1	0	0	5	3	+2
Russia	24	3	1	20	45	95	−50
Slovakia	37	12	1	24	72	107	-35
Slovenia	24	17	0	7	83	60	+23
South Korea	3	2	0	1	19	10	+9
Sweden	17	2	0	15	28	63	−35
Switzerland	40	13	1	26	77	119	-42
Ukraine	25	14	5	6	90	49	+41
United States	9	1	0	8	18	42	−24
Total	516	253	25	238	1 543	1 434	+109

== Uniform evolution ==
National team jerseys

From 1993 to 1995, the Reebok-made jersey featured the Pahonia coat of arms

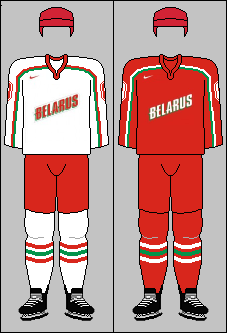
IIHF jerseys 1998–2000

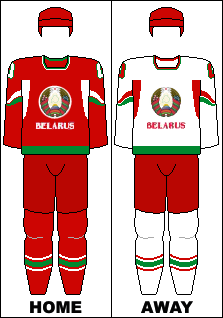
former IIHF jerseys

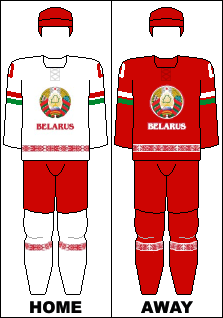
2014–2017 IIHF jerseys

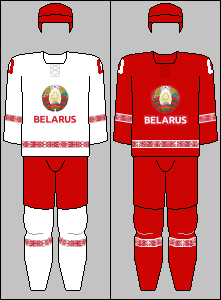
2017–2021 IIHF jerseys

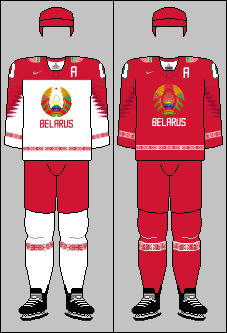
2021– IIHF jerseys
