= Peter Cehlárik =

Slovak ice hockey player (born 1995)

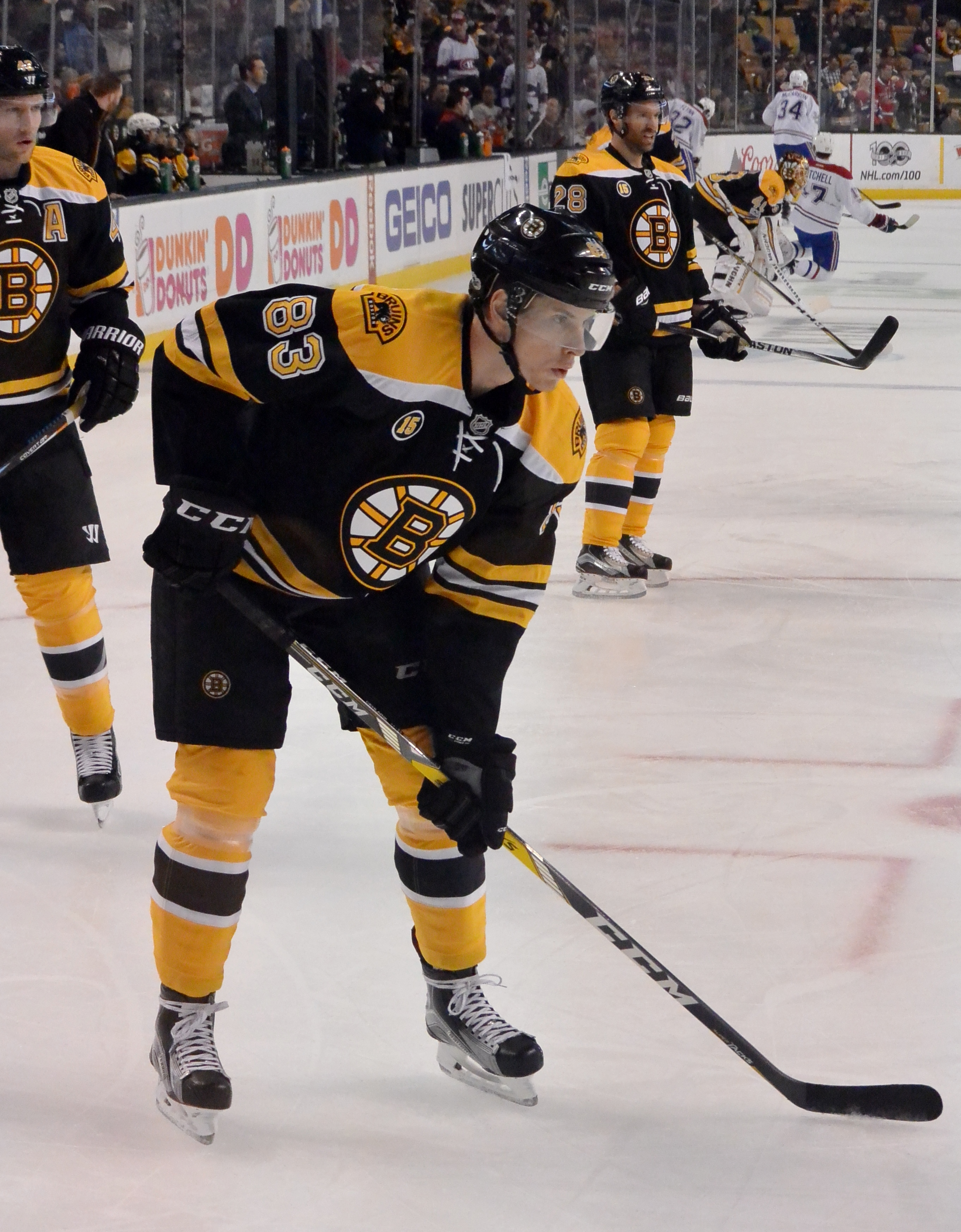
- Cehlárik in 2017
- Born: 2 August 1995 (age 30) Žilina, Slovakia
- Height: 6 ft 2 in (188 cm)
- Weight: 198 lb (90 kg; 14 st 2 lb)
- Position: Forward
- Shoots: Left
- SHL team Former teams: Leksands IF; Luleå HF; Boston Bruins; Avangard Omsk; EV Zug
- National team: Slovakia
- NHL draft: 90th overall, 2013; Boston Bruins
- Playing career: 2013–present

Peter Cehlárik (born 2 August 1995) is a Slovak professional ice hockey player who is a forward for Leksands IF of the Swedish Hockey League (SHL). He was selected by the Boston Bruins in the third round, 90th overall, of the 2013 NHL entry draft.

== Playing career ==
Cehlárik played four junior seasons in his native Slovakia before continuing his development in Sweden. He made his Elitserien debut playing with Luleå HF during the 2012–13 Elitserien season. He helped the team win the Champions Hockey League during the 2014–15 season.

After playing 132 games, adding 22 goals and 49 points throughout four seasons with Luleå, he signed a three-year, entry-level contract with the Boston Bruins on 16 June 2016. He made his NHL debut on 11 February 2017 against the Vancouver Canucks. He played 11 games for Boston Bruins before returning to Providence Bruins.

Cehlárik scored his first NHL goal on 18 November 2017 with the Bruins as the first Boston goal in a road game against the San Jose Sharks, in what would become a 3–1 Boston victory.

After Cehlárik was left off Boston's Return to Play roster as an impending restricted free agent from the Bruins, Cehlárik halted his North American career and signed a two-year contract with Swedish club, Leksands IF of the SHL, on 17 August 2020.

After a lone season in the Kontinental Hockey League (KHL) with Avangard Omsk in 2021–22, Cehlárik opted to move to Switzerland in agreeing to a two-year contract with EV Zug of the National League (NL) on 24 May 2022.

In the 2022–23 season, Cehlárik in a top-six scoring role, scored 6 goals and 24 points through 38 regular season games, before opting to leave Switzerland and immediately return to former club, Leksands IF of the SHL, signing a contract until 2026 on 8 February 2023.

== Career statistics ==
=== Regular season and playoffs ===
			Regular season					Playoffs
Season	Team	League	GP	G	A	Pts	PIM	GP	G	A	Pts	PIM
2008–09	MsHK Žilina	SVK U18	1	0	0	0	0	—	—	—	—	—
2009–10	MsHK Žilina	SVK U18	28	4	4	8	4	—	—	—	—	—
2009–10	MsHK Žilina B	SVK-2 U18	2	0	0	0	0	—	—	—	—	—
2010–11	MsHK Žilina	SVK U18	40	15	18	33	8	—	—	—	—	—
2010–11	MsHK Žilina B	SVK-2 U18	2	2	0	2	2	—	—	—	—	—
2011–12	MsHK Žilina	SVK U18	6	6	2	8	16	—	—	—	—	—
2011–12	Luleå HF	J18	12	8	8	16	0	—	—	—	—	—
2011–12	Luleå HF	J18 Allsv	12	7	7	14	0	4	2	0	2	0
2011–12	Luleå HF	J20	8	2	2	4	2	1	3	0	3	0
2012–13	Luleå HF	J18	4	5	4	9	0	—	—	—	—	—
2012–13	Luleå HF	J18 Allsv	6	3	5	8	0	—	—	—	—	—
2012–13	Luleå HF	J20	38	17	20	37	10	3	0	1	1	2
2012–13	Luleå HF	SEL	8	3	3	6	0	6	1	0	1	0
2013–14	Luleå HF	J20	4	5	2	7	0	—	—	—	—	—
2013–14	Luleå HF	SHL	32	2	2	4	4	2	0	0	0	0
2013–14	Asplöven HC	SWE-2	18	5	8	13	6	—	—	—	—	—
2014–15	Luleå HF	J20	1	0	0	0	0	—	—	—	—	—
2014–15	Luleå HF	SHL	46	6	13	19	6	8	1	1	2	0
2015–16	Luleå HF	SHL	46	11	9	20	4	11	3	2	5	0
2016–17	Boston Bruins	NHL	11	0	2	2	0	—	—	—	—	—
2016–17	Providence Bruins	AHL	49	20	18	38	20	2	0	1	1	2
2017–18	Boston Bruins	NHL	6	1	1	2	2	—	—	—	—	—
2017–18	Providence Bruins	AHL	35	11	12	23	10	3	2	0	2	4
2018–19	Boston Bruins	NHL	20	4	2	6	6	—	—	—	—	—
2018–19	Providence Bruins	AHL	53	12	26	38	14	4	1	0	1	0
2019–20	Boston Bruins	NHL	3	0	1	1	2	—	—	—	—	—
2019–20	Providence Bruins	AHL	48	16	21	37	22	—	—	—	—	—
2020–21	Leksands IF	SHL	45	20	20	40	32	4	0	1	1	0
2021–22	Avangard Omsk	KHL	39	14	11	25	8	13	0	12	12	8
2022–23	EV Zug	NL	38	6	18	24	26	—	—	—	—	—
2022–23	Leksands IF	SHL	11	3	1	4	6	3	0	1	1	2
2023–24	Leksands IF	SHL	52	19	20	39	16	7	1	1	2	0
2024–25	Leksands IF	SHL	39	12	9	21	20	—	—	—	—	—
2025–26	Leksands IF	SHL	45	5	19	24	16	—	—	—	—	—
SHL totals			324	81	96	177	104	41	6	6	12	4
NHL totals			40	5	6	11	10	—	—	—	—	—

Medal record

Representing Slovakia

Ice hockey

Olympics
Bronze medal – third place	2022 Beijing	

IIHF World Junior Championship
Bronze medal – third place	2015 Canada	

=== International ===
Year	Team	Event	GP	G	A	Pts	PIM
2012	Slovakia	IH18	2	0	0	0	0
2013	Slovakia	WJC18	6	2	5	7	0
2014	Slovakia	WJC	5	0	3	3	2
2015	Slovakia	WJC	7	2	1	3	6
2016	Slovakia	WC	5	1	0	1	2
2021	Slovakia	WC	8	5	6	11	6
2021	Slovakia	OGQ	3	2	0	2	0
2022	Slovakia	OG	7	2	2	4	4
2023	Slovakia	WC	5	2	2	4	2
2024	Slovakia	WC	8	3	1	4	4
2026	Slovakia	OG	2	0	0	0	0
Junior totals			20	4	9	13	8
Senior totals			38	15	11	26	18

== Awards and honours ==
Award	Year
International
World Championship Best Forward	2021
