= Dinamo-Raubichi Minsk =

- City: Minsk, Belarus
- League: MHL
- Conference: West Conference
- Founded: 2015
- Affiliate: HC Dinamo Minsk (KHL)

Dinamo-Raubichi Minsk is an ice hockey team based in Minsk, Belarus. Founded in 2015, they play in the West Conference of the Russian under-20 Junior Hockey League (MHL).
