= 2021 IIHF World Championship =

2021 edition of the IIHF World Championship

Tournament details
- Host country: Latvia
- Venues: 2 (in 1 host city)
- Dates: 21 May – 6 June
- Opened by: Egils Levits
- Teams: 16

Final positions
- Champions: Canada (27th title)
- Runners-up: Finland
- Third place: United States
- Fourth place: Germany

Tournament statistics
- Games played: 64
- Goals scored: 324 (5.06 per game)
- Attendance: 934 (15 per game)
- Scoring leader: (Canada) Connor Brown (16 points)

Awards
- MVP: (Canada) Andrew Mangiapane

The 2021 IIHF World Championship took place from 21 May to 6 June 2021. It was originally to be co-hosted by Minsk, Belarus and Riga, Latvia, as the IIHF announced on 19 May 2017 in Cologne, Germany. Their joint bid won by a very tight margin against the Finnish bid with the cities of Tampere and Helsinki. On 18 January 2021 the IIHF decided to remove Belarus as a co-host due to the rising political unrest and COVID-19 concerns there. On 2 February, the IIHF voted to confirm Latvia as the sole host for the 2021 IIHF World Championship.

This tournament was notable for the number of upsets that occurred in the preliminary round, including Denmark and Belarus' victories over Sweden, Kazakhstan's victory over Finland, Slovakia's victory over Russia, and Latvia's victory over Canada. Sweden did not qualify for the quarter-finals for the first time since the current format has been introduced. On the other hand, Kazakhstan recorded their best World Championship result to date, finishing tenth, while only narrowly missing their first-ever play-off appearance.

Canada won their record-tying 27th title, after defeating Finland in the final in overtime. Canada was the first team in history to win gold despite losing four times during the tournament. The United States won the bronze medal game, defeating Germany 6–1.

== Venues ==
The Minsk Arena was originally planned to be used for the Championship.

2021 IIHF World Championship is located in Riga	Riga	
2021 IIHF World Championship is located in Riga	Arēna Rīga	Olympic Sports Centre
2021 IIHF World Championship is located in Riga	56°58′4.5″N 24°7′17″E	56°58′4.4″N 24°7′27″E
2021 IIHF World Championship is located in Riga	Capacity: 10,300	Capacity: 6,200

=== COVID-19 restrictions ===
Due to COVID-19 pandemic protocols, the tournament was initially held behind closed doors with no spectators. Prior to the beginning of the tournament, and against objections by Prime Minister Krišjānis Kariņš and Minister of Health Daniels Pavļuts, the Latvian parliament voted in favour of a notion ordering the government to develop a plan for allowing spectators who are either fully vaccinated or otherwise immune due to recent infection.

Spectators were admitted beginning June 1, and were to present electronic verification that they have either been fully vaccinated no fewer than 14 days prior with the Janssen, Moderna, or Pfizer vaccine, been fully vaccinated with the AstraZeneca vaccine, have received the first dose of the AstraZeneca vaccine between 22 and 90 days prior, or have recently recovered from COVID-19. Arēna Rīga was capped at 2,660 spectators, and the Olympic Sports Centre at 1,058. Face masks were mandatory.

=== Belarus hosting controversy ===
Despite similar political opposition in 2014 when Belarus was the sole host of the IIHF World Championship, Belarus was to be the co-host for the 2021 Championship. However, in the wake of the ongoing 2020–2021 Belarusian protests, several political groups, politicians and international entities, including the European Parliament and Krišjānis Kariņš, the Prime Minister of Latvia, which was set to co-host the championship, protested tournament matches being held in Belarus, and called for the country to be stripped of co-hosting duties. Several sponsors of the tournament reportedly threatened to withdraw from sponsoring the event if it took place in Belarus.

On January 18, 2021, the IIHF, citing "safety and security issues," decided that the World Championship would not be played in Belarus. Latvia would remain as a co-host for the time being, but the IIHF was considering whether to go with another site, due to COVID-19 constraints and the desirability for single-site travel. Both Denmark and Slovakia (the tournament hosts in 2018 and 2019, respectively) reportedly offered to step in as hosts. An offer from Lithuania was declined by both the IIHF and the Latvian Ice Hockey Federation.

=== Belarus flag controversy ===
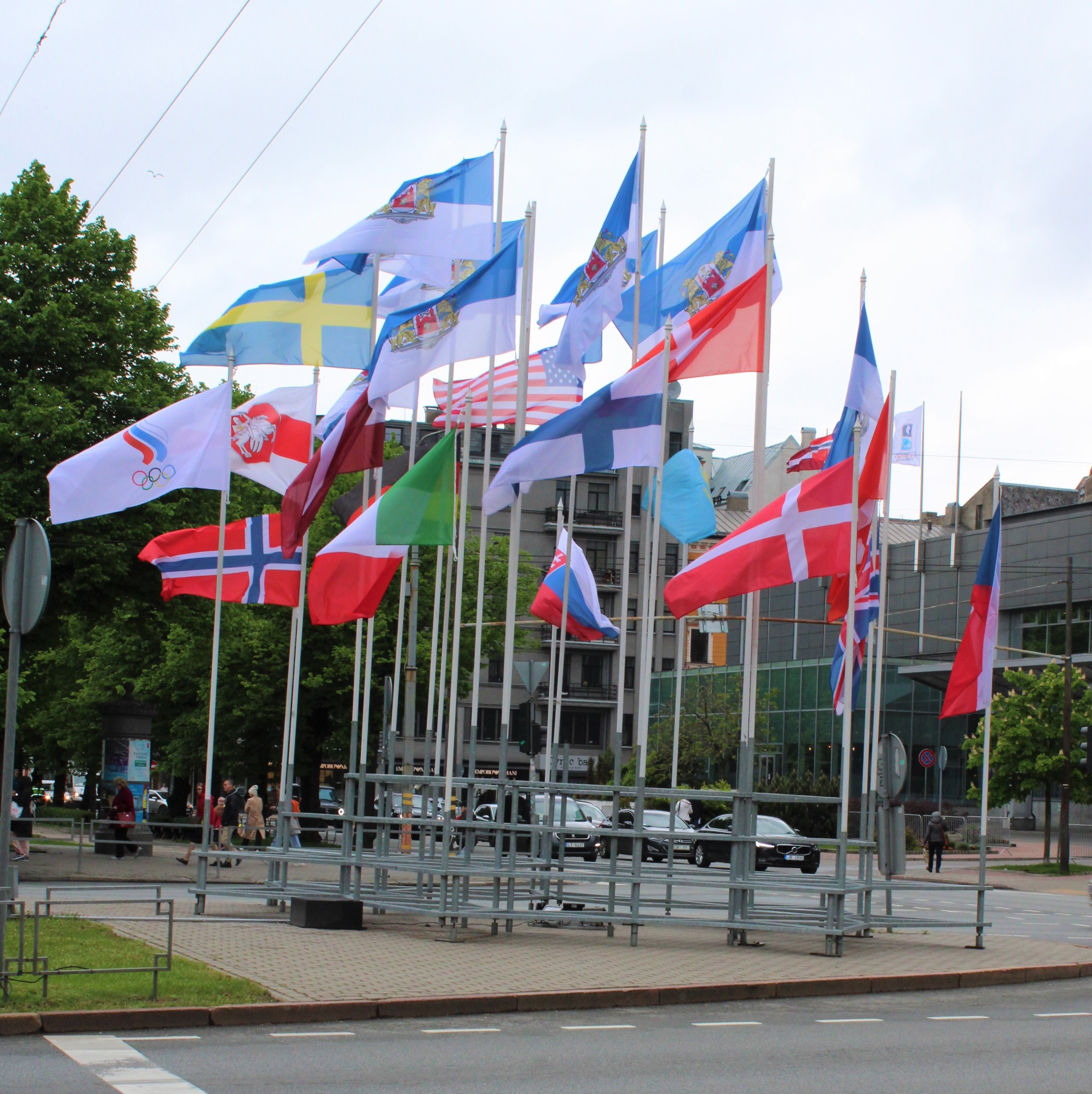
Controversial flagpoles of the teams at the 2021 IIHF World Championship in Riga, with the Belarusian flag replaced.

On 24 May 2021, following the Ryanair Flight 4978 incident, Latvian officials replaced the Belarusian state flag in Riga with the former flag faced with the former coat of arms used by opposition groups, including at the 2021 IIHF World Championship display of flags, which was replaced by Mayor of Riga Mārtiņš Staķis and Minister of Foreign Affairs of Latvia Edgars Rinkēvičs. As a result, Belarus expelled the entire Latvian embassy from their country. The IIHF issued a statement protesting the replacement of the flag, and IIHF president René Fasel asked Riga's mayor to remove the IIHF name, flag and symbols from such sites, or to restore the flag, insisting that the IIHF is an "apolitical sports organization". In response, Staķis said he would remove the IIHF flags. On 28 May 2021, Belarus opened a criminal case against Staķis and Rinkēvičs, accusing them of fuelling "national enmity".

== Participants ==
Map of the countries participating at the 2021 IIHF World Championship

Qualified as host

- Latvia

Automatic qualifier after the cancellation of the 2020 IIHF World Championship

- Belarus (originally co-host)
- Canada
- Czech Republic
- Denmark
- Finland
- Germany
- Great Britain
- Italy
- Kazakhstan
- Norway
- ROC^{1}
- Slovakia
- Sweden
- Switzerland
- United States

^{1} Pursuant to a December 2020 ruling by the Court of Arbitration for Sport on doping sanctions, Russian athletes and teams were prohibited from competing under the Russian flag or using the Russian national anthem at any Olympic Games or world championships through 16 December 2022, and competed as "neutral athlete[s]." For IIHF tournaments, the Russian team played under the name "Russian Olympic Committee" (ROC). Instead of the Russian national anthem being played at the 2021 World Championship, Piano Concerto No. 1 by Pyotr Illych Tchaikovsky was played.

== Seeding ==
The seedings in the preliminary round are based on the 2020 IIHF World Ranking, as of the end of the 2019 IIHF World Championship, using the serpentine system with a swap between Canada and ROC to "accommodate special organizational needs".

Group A

- ROC (2)
- Sweden (4)
- Czech Republic (5)
- Switzerland (8)
- Slovakia (9)
- Denmark (12)
- Belarus (13)
- Great Britain (19)

Group B

- Canada (1)
- Finland (3)
- United States (6)
- Germany (7)
- Latvia (10)
- Norway (11)
- Italy (15)
- Kazakhstan (16)

== Rosters ==
Each team's roster consists of at least 15 skaters (forwards, and defencemen) and 2 goaltenders, and at most 25 skaters and 3 goaltenders. All 16 participating nations, through the confirmation of their respective national associations, had to submit a "Long List" no later than two weeks before the tournament, and a final roster by the Passport Control meeting prior to the start of the tournament.

== Match officials ==
Eighteen referees and linesmen were announced on 7 April 2021.

Referees	Linesmen
(Austria) Christoph Sternat; (Belarus) Maxim Sidorenko; (Canada) Oliver Gouin; (Czech Republic) Antonín Jeřábek; (Czech Republic) Martin Fraňo; (Czech Republic) Robin Šír; (Denmark) Mads Frandsen; (Finland) Lassi Heikkinen; (Finland) Kristian Vikman; (Germany) André Schrader; (Latvia) Andris Ansons; (Russia) Roman Gofman; (Russia) Yevgeni Romasko; (Slovakia) Peter Stano; (Sweden) Tobias Björk; (Sweden) Mikael Nord; (Switzerland) Michael Tscherrig; (United States) Andrew Bruggeman	(Austria) Elias Seewald; (Belarus) Dmitri Golyak; (Canada) Dustin McCrank; (Czech Republic) Daniel Hynek; (Czech Republic) Jiří Ondráček; (Denmark) Andreas Krøyer; (Finland) Lauri Nikulainen; (Finland) Hannu Sormunen; (France) Nicolas Constantineau; (Germany) Jonas Merten; (Latvia) Dāvis Zunde; (Russia) Gleb Lazarev; (Russia) Nikita Shalagin; (Slovakia) Šimon Synek; (Sweden) Ludvig Lundgren; (Sweden) Emil Yletyinen; (Switzerland) David Obwegeser; (United States) Brian Oliver

== Mascot ==
The official mascot of the tournament was revealed in February 2020 by the IIHF. His name is Spiky the Hedgehog and he was voted by the fans in Belarus and Latvia. The hedgehog is a very popular animal in the hosting countries and it represents the fighting spirit and determination of the Belarus and Latvian national hockey teams.

== Preliminary round ==
The groups were announced on 20 May 2020. The schedule was released on 5 February 2021.

=== Group A ===
Pos	Team	Pld	W	OTW	OTL	L	GF	GA	GD	Pts	Qualification
1	ROC	7	5	1	0	1	28	10	+18	17	Quarterfinals
2	Switzerland	7	5	0	0	2	27	17	+10	15	Quarterfinals
3	Czech Republic	7	3	2	0	2	27	18	+9	13	Quarterfinals
4	Slovakia	7	4	0	0	3	17	22	−5	12	Quarterfinals
5	Sweden	7	3	0	1	3	21	14	+7	10	
6	Denmark	7	2	1	1	3	13	15	−2	9	
7	Great Britain	7	1	0	1	5	13	31	−18	4 (Note: Belarus 3–4 Great Britain)	
8	Belarus	7	1	0	1	5	10	29	−19	4	

Source: IIHF
Rules for classification: 1) points; 2) head-to-head points; 3) head-to-head goal difference; 4) head-to-head number of goals scored; 5) result against closest best-ranked team outside tied teams; 6) result against second-best-ranked team outside tied teams; 7) seeding before tournament
Notes:

21 May 2021
ROC	4–3	Czech Republic
Belarus	2–5	Slovakia
22 May 2021
Denmark	4–3	Sweden
Great Britain	1–7	ROC
Czech Republic	2–5	Switzerland
23 May 2021
Great Britain	1–2	Slovakia
Sweden	0–1	Belarus
Denmark	0–1	Switzerland
24 May 2021
Slovakia	3–1	ROC
Czech Republic	3–2 (OT)	Belarus
25 May 2021
Great Britain	2–3 (OT)	Denmark
Switzerland	0–7	Sweden
26 May 2021
ROC	3–0	Denmark
Belarus	3–4	Great Britain
27 May 2021
Switzerland	8–1	Slovakia
Sweden	2–4	Czech Republic
28 May 2021
Sweden	4–1	Great Britain
Denmark	5–2	Belarus
29 May 2021
Czech Republic	6–1	Great Britain
Switzerland	1–4	ROC
Slovakia	2–0	Denmark
30 May 2021
Belarus	0–6	Switzerland
Sweden	3–1	Slovakia
31 May 2021
Czech Republic	2–1 (GWS)	Denmark
ROC	3–2 (GWS)	Sweden
1 June 2021
Switzerland	6–3	Great Britain
Slovakia	3–7	Czech Republic
ROC	6–0	Belarus

=== Group B ===
Pos	Team	Pld	W	OTW	OTL	L	GF	GA	GD	Pts	Qualification
1	United States	7	6	0	0	1	21	8	+13	18	Quarterfinals
2	Finland	7	4	2	1	0	19	10	+9	17	Quarterfinals
3	Germany	7	4	0	0	3	22	14	+8	12	Quarterfinals
4	Canada	7	3	0	1	3	19	18	+1	10 (Note: Kazakhstan 2–4 Canada)	Quarterfinals
5	Kazakhstan	7	2	2	0	3	22	18	+4	10	
6	Latvia (H)	7	2	0	3	2	15	16	−1	9	
7	Norway	7	2	1	0	4	17	21	−4	8	
8	Italy	7	0	0	0	7	11	41	−30	0	

Source: IIHF
Rules for classification: 1) points; 2) head-to-head points; 3) head-to-head goal difference; 4) head-to-head number of goals scored; 5) result against closest best-ranked team outside tied teams; 6) result against second-best ranked team outside tied teams; 7) seeding before tournament.
(H) Host
Notes:

21 May 2021
Germany	9–4	Italy
Canada	0–2	Latvia
22 May 2021
Norway	1–5	Germany
Finland	2–1	United States
Latvia	2–3 (GWS)	Kazakhstan
23 May 2021
Norway	4–1	Italy
Kazakhstan	2–1 (GWS)	Finland
Canada	1–5	United States
24 May 2021
Latvia	3–0	Italy
Germany	3–1	Canada
25 May 2021
United States	3–0	Kazakhstan
Finland	5–2	Norway
26 May 2021
Kazakhstan	3–2	Germany
Canada	4–2	Norway
27 May 2021
United States	4–2	Latvia
Finland	3–0	Italy
28 May 2021
Kazakhstan	2–4	Canada
Latvia	3–4 (GWS)	Norway
29 May 2021
Italy	3–11	Kazakhstan
Norway	1–2	United States
Germany	1–2	Finland
30 May 2021
Italy	1–7	Canada
Finland	3–2 (OT)	Latvia
31 May 2021
United States	2–0	Germany
Norway	3–1	Kazakhstan
1 June 2021
Canada	2–3 (GWS)	Finland
Italy	2–4	United States
Germany	2–1	Latvia

== Playoff round ==
=== Pairings ===
Quarter-finalists were paired according to their positions in the groups: the first-place team in each preliminary-round group played the fourth-place team of the other group, while the second-place team played the third-place team of the other group.

Semi-finalists are paired according to their seeding after the preliminary round, which is determined by the following criteria: 1) position in the group; 2) number of points; 3) goal difference; 4) number of goals scored for; 5) seeding number entering the tournament. The best-ranked semi-finalist plays against the lowest-ranked semi-finalist, while the second-best-ranked semi-finalist plays the third-best-ranked semi-finalist.

Rank	Team	Grp	Pos	Pts	GD	GF	Seed
1	United States	B	1	18	+13	21	6
2	ROC	A	1	17	+18	28	2
3	Finland	B	2	17	+9	19	3
4	Switzerland	A	2	15	+10	27	8
5	Czech Republic	A	3	13	+9	27	5
6	Germany	B	3	12	+8	22	7
7	Slovakia	A	4	12	−5	17	9
8	Canada	B	4	10	+1	19	1

=== Bracket ===
Quarterfinals
3 June
2B Finland	1
3A Czech Republic	0
3 June
2A Switzerland	2
3B Germany (GWS)	3
3 June
1B United States	6
4A Slovakia	1
3 June
1A ROC	1
4B Canada (OT)	2

Semifinals
5 June
3 Finland	2
6 Germany	1
5 June
1 United States	2
8 Canada	4

Final
6 June
3 Finland	2
8 Canada (OT)	3
Third place
6 June
1 United States	6
6 Germany	1

=== Final ===
6 June 2021; 20:15	Finland	2–3 OT (1–0, 0–1, 1–1) (OT: 0–1)	Canada	Arena Riga, Riga

Game reference

Juho Olkinuora
Goalies
Darcy Kuemper
Referees:
(Czech Republic) Martin Fraňo
(Russia) Yevgeni Romasko
Linesmen:
(Russia) Gleb Lazarev
(Russia) Nikita Shalagin

Ruohomaa (Kaski) – 08:57	1–0
	1–1	24:30 – Comtois (Brown, Walker) (PP)
Lindbohm (Nousiainen, Ruohomaa) - 45:27	2–1
	2–2	52:37 – Henrique (Comtois, Brown) (PP)
	2–3	66:26 – Paul (Brown)

6 min
Penalties
30 min
31
Shots
26

== Final standings ==
Pos	Grp	Team	Pld	W	OTW	OTL	L	GF	GA	GD	Pts	Final result
1	B	Canada	10	4	2	1	3	28	23	+5	17	Champions
2	B	Finland	10	6	2	2	0	24	14	+10	24	Runners-up
3	B	United States	10	8	0	0	2	35	14	+21	24	Third place
4	B	Germany	10	4	1	0	5	27	24	+3	14	Fourth place
5	A	ROC	8	5	1	1	1	29	12	+17	18	Eliminated in Quarter-finals
6	A	Switzerland	8	5	0	1	2	29	20	+9	16	Eliminated in Quarter-finals
7	A	Czech Republic	8	3	2	0	3	27	19	+8	13	Eliminated in Quarter-finals
8	A	Slovakia	8	4	0	0	4	18	28	−10	12	Eliminated in Quarter-finals
9	A	Sweden	7	3	0	1	3	21	14	+7	10	Eliminated in Group stage
10	B	Kazakhstan	7	2	2	0	3	22	18	+4	10	Eliminated in Group stage
11	B	Latvia (H)	7	2	0	3	2	15	16	−1	9	Eliminated in Group stage
12	A	Denmark	7	2	1	1	3	13	15	−2	9	Eliminated in Group stage
13	B	Norway	7	2	1	0	4	17	21	−4	8	Eliminated in Group stage
14	A	Great Britain	7	1	0	1	5	13	31	−18	4	Eliminated in Group stage
15	A	Belarus	7	1	0	1	5	10	29	−19	4	Eliminated in Group stage
16	B	Italy	7	0	0	0	7	11	41	−30	0	Eliminated in Group stage

Source: IIHF
Rules for classification: 1) position in the group; 2) number of points; 3) goal difference; 4) goals scored; 5) seeding before tournament.
(H) Host

== Statistics ==
=== Scoring leaders ===
List shows the top skaters sorted by points, then goals.

Player	GP	G	A	Pts	+/−	PIM	POS
(Canada) Connor Brown	10	2	14	16	+8	2	F
(United States) Conor Garland	10	6	7	13	+6	6	F
(Canada) Andrew Mangiapane	7	7	4	11	+6	0	F
(Canada) Adam Henrique	10	6	5	11	+6	0	F
(Slovakia) Peter Cehlárik	8	5	6	11	+5	6	F
(United Kingdom) Liam Kirk	7	7	2	9	−6	4	F
(United States) Trevor Moore	10	5	4	9	+7	4	F
(United States) Jason Robertson	10	4	5	9	+8	10	F
(Switzerland) Grégory Hofmann	8	6	2	8	0	0	F
(Denmark) Nicklas Jensen	7	5	3	8	−2	2	F

GP = Games played; G = Goals; A = Assists; Pts = Points; +/− = Plus/Minus; PIM = Penalties in Minutes; POS = Position
Source: IIHF.com

=== Goaltending leaders ===
Only the top five goaltenders, based on save percentage, who have played at least 40% of their team's minutes, are included in this list.

Player	TOI	GA	GAA	SA	Sv%	SO
(United States) Cal Petersen	417:14	9	1.29	193	95.34	2
(Sweden) Adam Reideborn	299:44	7	1.40	129	94.57	1
(Russia) Alexander Samonov	364:39	8	1.32	142	94.37	2
(Finland) Juho Olkinuora	431:26	10	1.39	174	94.25	1
(Kazakhstan) Nikita Boyarkin	370:00	14	2.27	198	92.93	0

TOI = time on ice (minutes:seconds); SA = shots against; GA = goals against; GAA = goals against average; Sv% = save percentage; SO = shutouts
Source: IIHF.com

== Awards ==
The awards were announced on 6 June 2021.

=== Individual awards ===
Position	Player
Goaltender	(United States) Cal Petersen
Defenceman	(Germany) Moritz Seider
Forward	(Slovakia) Peter Cehlárik

=== Media All Stars ===
Position	Player
Goaltender	(Finland) Juho Olkinuora
Defenceman	(Germany) Moritz Seider
Defenceman	(Germany) Korbinian Holzer
Forward	(Canada) Andrew Mangiapane
Forward	(United States) Conor Garland
Forward	(United Kingdom) Liam Kirk
MVP	(Canada) Andrew Mangiapane

== Broadcasting rights ==
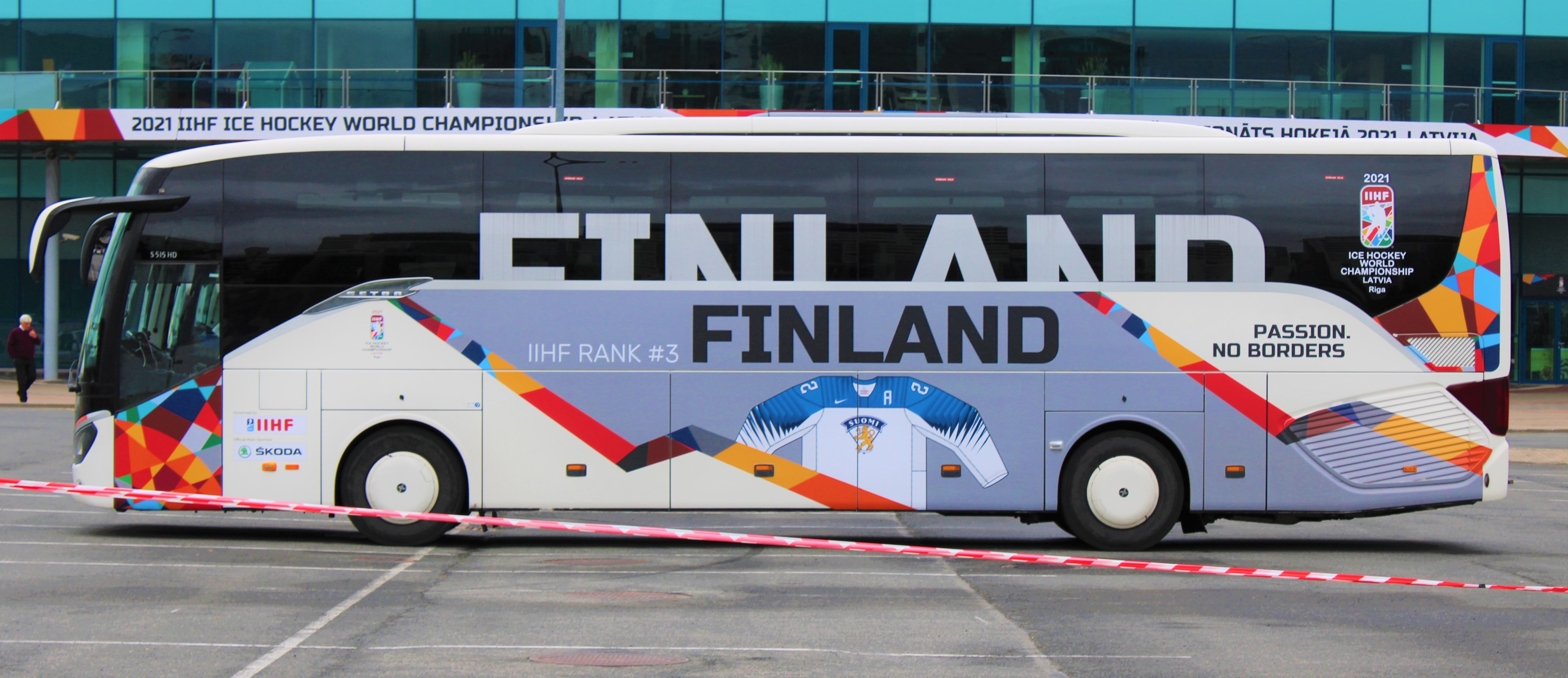
Finnish national hockey team's bus at the 2021 IIHF World Championship next to Arēna Rīga.

These are the broadcasters for the tournament.

Country	Broadcaster
Austria	ORF
Belarus	BTRC
Brazil	ESPN Brasil
Canada	TSN
Canada	RDS
Croatia	Arena Sport
Czech Republic	ČT Sport
Denmark	TV 2 Sport
Estonia	ERR
Finland	MTV3
Finland	C More
France	L'Équipe
Georgia	Silk Sport
Germany	Sport1
Hungary	Sport 1
Italy	DAZN
Israel	Sport 1
Kazakhstan	Qazsport
Latvia	LTV, 360TV
Norway	V Sport
Poland	TVP
Portugal	Sport TV
Russia	Channel One
Russia	Match TV
Slovakia	RTVS
Slovenia	RTV
Sweden	SVT
Switzerland	SRG SSR
Turkey	Tivibu Spor
United Kingdom	FreeSports
United States	NHL Network
United States	ESPN+
