= 2021 IIHF World Championship Group B =

Ice hockey tournament group stage

Group B was one of two groups of the 2021 IIHF World Championship. The four best placed teams advanced to the playoff round.

Due to COVID-19 pandemic protocols, the tournament was held in a "bubble" behind closed doors with no spectators. Prior to the beginning of the tournament, and against objections by Prime Minister Arturs Krišjānis Kariņš and Minister of Health, Daniels Pavļuts, the Latvian parliament voted in favour of a notion ordering the government to develop a plan for allowing spectators who are either fully vaccinated or otherwise immune due to recent infection.

== Standings ==
Pos	Team	Pld	W	OTW	OTL	L	GF	GA	GD	Pts	Qualification
1	United States	7	6	0	0	1	21	8	+13	18	Quarterfinals
2	Finland	7	4	2	1	0	19	10	+9	17	Quarterfinals
3	Germany	7	4	0	0	3	22	14	+8	12	Quarterfinals
4	Canada	7	3	0	1	3	19	18	+1	10 (Note: Kazakhstan 2–4 Canada)	Quarterfinals
5	Kazakhstan	7	2	2	0	3	22	18	+4	10	
6	Latvia (H)	7	2	0	3	2	15	16	−1	9	
7	Norway	7	2	1	0	4	17	21	−4	8	
8	Italy	7	0	0	0	7	11	41	−30	0	

Source: IIHF
Rules for classification: 1) points; 2) head-to-head points; 3) head-to-head goal difference; 4) head-to-head number of goals scored; 5) result against closest best-ranked team outside tied teams; 6) result against second-best ranked team outside tied teams; 7) seeding before tournament.
(H) Host

== Matches ==
All times are local (UTC+3).

=== Germany vs Italy ===
21 May 2021; 16:15	Germany	9–4 (2–2, 5–0, 2–2)	Italy	Arena Riga, Riga

Game reference

Felix Brückmann
Goalies
Justin Fazio
Referees:
(United States) Andrew Bruggeman
(Czech Republic) Martin Fraňo
Linesmen:
(Canada) Dustin McCrank
(United States) Brian Oliver

Kühnhackl (Krämmer) – 15:56	1–0
	1–1	17:42 – Petan (Miceli)
	1–2	18:07 – Frigo (Magnabosco, Bardaro)
M. Müller (Eisenschmid, Loibl) – 18:44	2–2
Rieder (Kühnhackl, Krämmer) – 24:23	3–2
Tiffels (Eisenschmid, Plachta) (PP) – 27:47	4–2
Noebels (J. Müller, Pföderl) – 35:13	5–2
Reichel (Seider) – 37:52	6–2
Noebels (Pföderl, Reichel) – 38:35	7–2
Plachta (Tiffels, Holzer) (SH) – 42:52	8–2
	8–3	43:22 – Bardaro (Deluca) (PP)
	8–4	44:06 – Frank (Frigo) (PP)
Pföderl (Noebels, Reichel) – 48:41	9–4

29 min
Penalties
6 min
52
Shots
13

=== Canada vs Latvia ===
21 May 2021; 20:15	Canada	0–2 (0–1, 0–1, 0–0)	Latvia	Arēna Rīga, Riga

Game reference
Darcy Kuemper	Goalies	Matīss Kivlenieks	Referees: (Germany) André Schrader (Switzerland) Michael Tscherrig; Linesmen: (Germany) Jonas Merten (Switzerland) David Obwegeser
0–1 / 19:58 – Indrašis (Ķēniņš, Freibergs) (PP); 0–2 / 28:39 – Batņa (Ķēniņš)			Referees: (Germany) André Schrader (Switzerland) Michael Tscherrig; Linesmen: (Germany) Jonas Merten (Switzerland) David Obwegeser
8 min	Penalties	8 min	Referees: (Germany) André Schrader (Switzerland) Michael Tscherrig; Linesmen: (Germany) Jonas Merten (Switzerland) David Obwegeser
38	Shots	17	Referees: (Germany) André Schrader (Switzerland) Michael Tscherrig; Linesmen: (Germany) Jonas Merten (Switzerland) David Obwegeser

=== Norway vs Germany ===
22 May 2021; 12:15	Norway	1–5 (0–1, 1–3, 0–1)	Germany	Arēna Rīga, Riga

Game reference

Henrik Haukeland
Goalies
Mathias Niederberger
Referees:
(United States) Andrew Bruggeman
(Canada) Oliver Gouin
Linesmen:
(France) Nicolas Constantineau
(Canada) Dustin McCrank

	0–1	19:44 – Plachta (M. Müller, Seider)
	0–2	23:19 – Gawanke (Brandt, Noebels) (PP)
	0–3	26:04 – Pföderl (Reichel, Noebels)
	0–4	30:35 – Reichel
Lilleberg (M. Olimb, Haga) – 36:21	1–4
	1–5	44:41 – Bergmann (Nowak, Krämmer)

16 min
Penalties
4 min
25
Shots
26

=== Finland vs United States ===
22 May 2021; 16:15	Finland	2–1 (0–0, 2–1, 0–0)	United States	Arena Riga, Riga

Game reference

Juho Olkinuora
Goalies
Cal Petersen
Referees:
(Czech Republic) Antonín Jeřábek
(Slovakia) Peter Stano
Linesmen:
(Czech Republic) Daniel Hynek
(Czech Republic) Jiří Ondráček

Ohtamaa (Mäenalanen, Anttila) – 26:54	1–0
Pakarinen (Pokka, Määttä) – 35:41	2–0
	2–1	38:01 – Robertson (Wolanin) (PP)

4 min
Penalties
2 min
29
Shots
30

=== Latvia vs Kazakhstan ===
22 May 2021; 20:15	Latvia	2–3 GWS (0–0, 1–1, 1–1) (OT: 0–0) (SO: 0–1)	Kazakhstan	Arena Riga, Riga

Game reference

Matīss Kivlenieks
Goalies
Nikita Boyarkin
Referees:
(Denmark) Mads Frandsen
(Sweden) Mikael Nord
Linesmen:
(Denmark) Andreas Krøyer
(Sweden) Emil Yletyinen

Dārziņš (Daugaviņš) – 27:44	1–0
	1–1	38:59 – Shin (Starchenko, Dietz) (PP)
Ri. Bukarts (Cibuļskis) – 45:25	2–1
	2–2	45:37 – Blacker (Svedberg, Sagadeyev)

Indrašis
Dārziņš
Ro. Bukarts
Daugaviņš (miss)
Ri. Bukarts (miss)
Indrašis (miss)
Dārziņš (miss)
Ro. Bukarts (miss)
Shootout
Shin
(miss) Valk
Mikhailis
Starchenko
(miss) Dietz
(miss) Starchenko
(miss) Mikhailis
Rymarev
8 min
Penalties
4 min
14
Shots
32

=== Norway vs Italy ===
23 May 2021; 12:15	Norway	4–1 (1–0, 2–0, 1–1)	Italy	Arena Riga, Riga

Game reference

Henrik Haukeland
Goalies
Justin Fazio
Referees:
(Sweden) Tobias Björk
(Denmark) Mads Frandsen
Linesmen:
(Sweden) Ludvig Lundgren
(Sweden) Emil Yletyinen

Trettenes (Olden, Lesund) – 10:04	1–0
Rosseli Olsen (M. Olimb, Espeland) (PP) – 25:12	2–0
Trettenes (Olden, Lindström) (PP) – 36:01	3–0
Trettenes (Lesund, Lindström) – 40:59	4–0
	4–1	51:55 – Frank (Andergassen, Marchetti)

2 min
Penalties
18 min
39
Shots
18

=== Kazakhstan vs Finland ===
23 May 2021; 16:15	Kazakhstan	2–1 GWS (0–0, 1–1, 0–0) (OT: 0–0) (SO: 1–0)	Finland	Arena Riga, Riga

Game reference
Nikita Boyarkin	Goalies	Harri Säteri	Referees: (Russia) Yevgeni Romasko (Belarus) Maxim Sidorenko; Linesmen: (Russia) Gleb Lazarev (Russia) Nikita Shalagin
/ 0–1 / 33:24 – Lundell (Lindbohm, Ruohomaa); Panyukov (Mikhailis) (PP) – 35:56 / 1–1			Referees: (Russia) Yevgeni Romasko (Belarus) Maxim Sidorenko; Linesmen: (Russia) Gleb Lazarev (Russia) Nikita Shalagin
Shin (miss); Valk; Mikhailis; Starchenko	Shootout	(miss) Turunen; Kaski; (miss) Ruotsalainen; (miss) Karjalainen	Referees: (Russia) Yevgeni Romasko (Belarus) Maxim Sidorenko; Linesmen: (Russia) Gleb Lazarev (Russia) Nikita Shalagin
4 min	Penalties	4 min	Referees: (Russia) Yevgeni Romasko (Belarus) Maxim Sidorenko; Linesmen: (Russia) Gleb Lazarev (Russia) Nikita Shalagin
20	Shots	51	Referees: (Russia) Yevgeni Romasko (Belarus) Maxim Sidorenko; Linesmen: (Russia) Gleb Lazarev (Russia) Nikita Shalagin

=== Canada vs United States ===
23 May 2021; 20:15	Canada	1–5 (0–1, 0–3, 1–1)	United States	Arena Riga, Riga

Game reference

Darcy Kuemper
Adin Hill
Goalies
Anthony Stolarz
Jake Oettinger
Referees:
(Germany) André Schrader
(Austria) Christoph Sternat
Linesmen:
(Switzerland) David Obwegeser
(Austria) Elias Seewald

	0–1	07:42 – Robertson (Garland)
	0–2	21:19 – Clendening (Hellickson)
	0–3	23:27 – Moore (Robertson) (PP)
	0–4	38:20 – Moore (Garland)
Comtois (Beaudin) – 51:35	1–4
	1–5	57:06 – Tennyson (Clendening)

6 min
Penalties
4 min
29
Shots
23

=== Latvia vs Italy ===
24 May 2021; 16:15	Latvia	3–0 (0–0, 1–0, 2–0)	Italy	Arena Riga, Riga

Game reference

Ivars Punnenovs
Goalies
Justin Fazio
Referees:
(United States) Andrew Bruggeman
(Canada) Oliver Gouin
Linesmen:
(France) Nicolas Constantineau
(Canada) Dustin McCrank

Karsums (Krastenbergs) – 32:08	1–0
Dārziņš (Džeriņš, Freibergs) – 58:48	2–0
Karsums (EN) – 59:48	3–0

16 min
Penalties
8 min
44
Shots
12

=== Germany vs Canada ===
24 May 2021; 20:15	Germany	3–1 (2–1, 0–0, 1–0)	Canada	Arena Riga, Riga

Game reference

Mathias Niederberger
Goalies
Adin Hill
Referees:
(Russia) Roman Gofman
(Russia) Yevgeni Romasko
Linesmen:
(Belarus) Dmitri Golyak
(Russia) Gleb Lazarev

Loibl (Kühnhackl, Rieder) – 10:46	1–0
Plachta (Eisenschmid) – 11:24	2–0
	2–1	18:19 – Paul (Miller)
Holzer (Plachta, Noebels) (EN) – 57:59	3–1

28 min
Penalties
8 min
25
Shots
40

=== United States vs Kazakhstan ===
25 May 2021; 16:15	United States	3–0 (1–0, 1–0, 1–0)	Kazakhstan	Arena Riga, Riga

Game reference

Cal Petersen
Goalies
Nikita Boyarkin
Referees:
(Czech Republic) Antonín Jeřábek
(Czech Republic) Robin Šír
Linesmen:
(Czech Republic) Daniel Hynek
(Slovakia) Šimon Synek

Clendening (Robertson, Moore) – 06:57	1–0
Moore (Jones) (EA) – 21:33	2–0
Drury (Donato, Tennyson) – 41:58	3–0

4 min
Penalties
8 min
52
Shots
18

=== Finland vs Norway ===
25 May 2021; 20:15	Finland	5–2 (1–1, 2–0, 2–1)	Norway	Arena Riga, Riga

Game reference

Juho Olkinuora
Goalies
Henrik Haukeland
Referees:
(United States) Andrew Bruggeman
(Czech Republic) Martin Fraňo
Linesmen:
(Canada) Dustin McCrank
(United States) Brian Oliver

	0–1	01:30 – M. Olimb (Haga)
Pakarinen (Ohtamaa, Kaski) – 14:24	1–1
Lundell (Ruotsalainen) – 21:40	2–1
Nousiainen (Sallinen) – 25:54	3–1
	3–2	41:13 – Lindström (Trettenes, Olden)
Innala (Kontiola, Sund) (PP) – 47:17	4–2
Björninen (Mäenalanen, Koivisto) – 53:25	5–2

0 min
Penalties
2 min
26
Shots
15

=== Kazakhstan vs Germany ===
26 May 2021; 16:15	Kazakhstan	3–2 (0–0, 1–2, 2–0)	Germany	Arena Riga, Riga

Game reference

Nikita Boyarkin
Goalies
Mathias Niederberger
Referees:
(Latvia) Andris Ansons
(Finland) Lassi Heikkinen
Linesmen:
(Finland) Hannu Sormunen
(Latvia) Dāvis Zunde

Shin (Stepanenko, Shalapov) – 26:39	1–0
	1–1	29:38 – Kühnhackl (Rieder, Holzer)
	1–2	34:07 – Eisenschmid (Loibl, Seider) (PP)
Starchenko (PS) – 40:31	2–2
Akolzin (Maklyukov) – 55:42	3–2

8 min
Penalties
2 min
15
Shots
30

=== Canada vs Norway ===
26 May 2021; 20:15	Canada	4–2 (2–0, 1–2, 1–0)	Norway	Arena Riga, Riga

Game reference

Darcy Kuemper
Goalies
Henrik Haukeland
Referees:
(Germany) André Schrader
(Switzerland) Michael Tscherrig
Linesmen:
(Germany) Jonas Merten
(Austria) Elias Seewald

Brown (Henrique, Power) – 00:22	1–0
Henrique (Brown, Power) (PP2) – 10:23	2–0
	2–1	29:08 – Valkvæ Olsen (Haga)
	2–2	30:28 – Rosseli Olsen (Krogdahl, Østby)
Mangiapane (Brown) – 34:41	3–2
Henrique (Foudy, Kuemper) (SH) – 50:14	4–2

8 min
Penalties
10 min
42
Shots
15

=== United States vs Latvia ===
27 May 2021; 16:15	United States	4–2 (2–2, 2–0, 0–0)	Latvia	Arena Riga, Riga

Game reference

Cal Petersen
Goalies
Matīss Kivlenieks
Referees:
(Finland) Lassi Heikkinen
(Finland) Kristian Vikman
Linesmen:
(Finland) Lauri Nikulainen
(Finland) Hannu Sormunen

Tennyson (Moore, Garland) – 01:06	1–0
	1–1	05:00 – Indrašis (Dārziņš) (PP2)
Boyle (Labanc, Abdelkader) – 14:46	2–1
	2–2	16:45 – Krastenbergs (Batņa, Freibergs)
Moore (Garland, Robertson) – 31:45	3–2
Beniers (Chmelevski, Boyle) – 33:32	4–2

10 min
Penalties
6 min
26
Shots
19

=== Finland vs Italy ===
27 May 2021; 20:15	Finland	3–0 (2–0, 1–0, 0–0)	Italy	Arena Riga, Riga

Game reference

Harri Säteri
Goalies
Justin Fazio
Referees:
(Denmark) Mads Frandsen
(Sweden) Mikael Nord
Linesmen:
(Denmark) Andreas Krøyer
(Sweden) Ludvig Lundgren

Sund (Kontiola, Innala) (PP) – 06:50	1–0
Ruotsalainen (Ojamäki) – 08:20	2–0
Sund (Mäenalanen, Koivisto) – 28:33	3–0

2 min
Penalties
6 min
36
Shots
11

=== Kazakhstan vs Canada ===
28 May 2021; 16:15	Kazakhstan	2–4 (0–1, 1–1, 1–2)	Canada	Arena Riga, Riga

Game reference

Andrei Shutov
Goalies
Darcy Kuemper
Referees:
(Russia) Yevgeni Romasko
(Belarus) Maxim Sidorenko
Linesmen:
(Belarus) Dmitri Golyak
(Russia) Gleb Lazarev

	0–1	06:03 – Mangiapane (Henrique, Brown) (PP)
	0–2	21:01 – Henrique (Power, Mangiapane)
Mikhailis – 24:30	1–2
Mikhailis (Valk, Savitski) – 41:31	2–2
	2–3	47:40 – Perfetti (Anderson-Dolan)
	2–4	59:57 – Brown (Henrique) (EN)

10 min
Penalties
2 min
28
Shots
36

=== Latvia vs Norway ===
28 May 2021; 20:15	Latvia	3–4 GWS (2–1, 0–1, 1–1) (OT: 0–0) (SO: 0–1)	Norway	Arena Riga, Riga

Game reference

Matīss Kivlenieks
Goalies
Henrik Haukeland
Referees:
(Czech Republic) Antonín Jeřábek
(Slovakia) Peter Stano
Linesmen:
(Czech Republic) Daniel Hynek
(Slovakia) Šimon Synek

	0–1	03:50 – Olden (Kåsastul, Trettenes)
Krastenbergs (Rubīns, Ķēniņš) – 11:55	1–1
Ķēniņš (Ābols, Sotnieks) – 17:44	2–1
	2–2	21:08 – K. Olimb (Rosseli Olsen) (SH)
	2–3	41:56 – Pettersen (Rosseli Olsen, K. Olimb)
Rubīns (Balinskis) – 49:42	3–3

Indrašis (miss)
Dārziņš
Ro. Bukarts (miss)
Krastenbergs (miss)
Ri. Bukarts (miss)
Indrašis (miss)
Shootout
(miss) Lindström
Olden
(miss) K. Olimb
(miss) Pettersen
(miss) Trettenes
Haga
8 min
Penalties
10 min
24
Shots
22

=== Italy vs Kazakhstan ===
29 May 2021; 12:15	Italy	3–11 (0–1, 1–2, 2–8)	Kazakhstan	Arena Riga, Riga

Game reference

Justin Fazio
Davide Fadani
Goalies
Nikita Boyarkin
Referees:
(Russia) Roman Gofman
(Belarus) Maxim Sidorenko
Linesmen:
(Belarus) Dmitri Golyak
(Russia) Nikita Shalagin

	0–1	02:12 – Starchenko (Valk, Mikhailis (PP)
Miceli (Petan, Frank) 24:37	1–1
	1–2	32:31 – Petukhov (Asetov, Stepanenko)
	1–3	34:59 – Rymarev (Shin, Blacker)
	1–4	41:31 – Mikhailis (Starchenko, Valk) (PP)
Hochkofler (Gander) – 41:43	2–4
	2–5	46:12 – Valk (Starchenko, Svedberg) (PP)
	2–6	47:01 – Likhotnikov
	2–7	49:46 – Likhotnikov (Maklyukov, Shalapov)
Petan – 50:59	3–7
	3–8	54:38 – Panyukov (Dietz, Starchenko)
	3–9	56:07 – Starchenko (Valk) (PP)
	3–10	57:44 – Svedberg (Shestakov, Sagadeyev)
	3–11	59:52 – Shalapov (Asetov, Likhotnikov) (PP2)

28 min
Penalties
10 min
24
Shots
36

=== Norway vs United States ===
29 May 2021; 16:15	Norway	1–2 (0–1, 0–1, 1–0)	United States	Arena Riga, Riga

Game reference

Henrik Haukeland
Goalies
Jake Oettinger
Referees:
(Austria) Christoph Sternat
(Switzerland) Michael Tscherrig
Linesmen:
(Germany) Jonas Merten
(Switzerland) David Obwegeser

	0–1	10:30 – Garland (Jones, Thompson) (PP)
	0–2	27:12 – Thompson (Donato, Roy)
K. Olimb (M. Olsen) – 54:27	1–2

8 min
Penalties
10 min
23
Shots
27

=== Germany vs Finland ===
29 May 2021; 20:15	Germany	1–2 (0–1, 1–0, 0–1)	Finland	Arena Riga, Riga

Game reference

Mathias Niederberger
Goalies
Juho Olkinuora
Referees:
(Czech Republic) Martin Fraňo
(Czech Republic) Robin Šír
Linesmen:
(Czech Republic) Jiří Ondráček
(Slovakia) Šimon Synek

	0–1	06:17 – Lundell (Sund, Innala) (PP)
Holzer (Loibl, Plachta) – 27:58	1–1
	1–2	51:26 – Ruotsalainen (Lundell)

6 min
Penalties
6 min
13
Shots
26

=== Italy vs Canada ===
30 May 2021; 16:15	Italy	1–7 (0–4, 1–2, 0–1)	Canada	Arena Riga, Riga

Game reference

Davide Fadani
Justin Fazio
Goalies
Adin Hill
Referees:
(Latvia) Andris Ansons
(Finland) Kristian Vikman
Linesmen:
(Czech Republic) Daniel Hynek
(Czech Republic) Jiří Ondráček

	0–1	02:33 – Perfetti (Schneider, Foudy)
	0–2	08:04 – Mangiapane (Brown, Henrique)
	0–3	11:33 – Stecher (Anderson-Dolan)
	0–4	11:56 – Henrique (Mangiapane)
Miceli (Pitschieler) – 30:31	1–4
	1–5	34:48 – Mangiapane (Brown, Ferraro)
	1–6	37:28 – Comtois (Mangiapane, Brown) (PP)
	1–7	55:54 – Pirri (Brown, Henrique)

6 min
Penalties
6 min
14
Shots
49

=== Finland vs Latvia ===
30 May 2021; 20:15	Finland	3–2 OT (1–1, 1–0, 0–1) (OT: 1–0)	Latvia	Arena Riga, Riga

Game reference

Harri Säteri
Goalies
Jānis Kalniņš
Referees:
(United States) Andrew Bruggeman
(Czech Republic) Martin Fraňo
Linesmen:
(Canada) Dustin McCrank
(United States) Brian Oliver

Mäenalanen (Anttila, Tiivola) – 03:06	1–0
	1–1	18:39 – Dzierkals
Pakarinen (Pokka, Innala) – 35:39	2–1
	2–2	53:45 – Dzierkals (Dārziņš, Sotnieks)
Lundell (Määttä) – 64:56	3–2

6 min
Penalties
4 min
35
Shots
37

=== United States vs Germany ===
31 May 2021; 16:15	United States	2–0 (0–0, 1–0, 1–0)	Germany	Arena Riga, Riga

Game reference
Cal Petersen	Goalies	Felix Brückmann	Referees: (Sweden) Tobias Björk (Denmark) Mads Frandsen; Linesmen: (Denmark) Andreas Krøyer (Sweden) Emil Yletyinen
Robertson (Donato, Garland) (PP) – 38:56 / 1–0; Blackwell (Robinson) (EN) – 59:33 / 2–0			Referees: (Sweden) Tobias Björk (Denmark) Mads Frandsen; Linesmen: (Denmark) Andreas Krøyer (Sweden) Emil Yletyinen
8 min	Penalties	8 min	Referees: (Sweden) Tobias Björk (Denmark) Mads Frandsen; Linesmen: (Denmark) Andreas Krøyer (Sweden) Emil Yletyinen
15	Shots	33	Referees: (Sweden) Tobias Björk (Denmark) Mads Frandsen; Linesmen: (Denmark) Andreas Krøyer (Sweden) Emil Yletyinen

=== Norway vs Kazakhstan ===
31 May 2021; 20:15	Norway	3–1 (0–1, 1–0, 2–0)	Kazakhstan	Arena Riga, Riga

Game reference

Henrik Haukeland
Goalies
Nikita Boyarkin
Referees:
(Czech Republic) Martin Fraňo
(Czech Republic) Robin Šír
Linesmen:
(Czech Republic) Daniel Hynek
(Slovakia) Šimon Synek

	0–1	16:00 – Shevchenko (Svedberg)
Valkvæ Olsen (Trettenes, Holøs) (PP) – 27:57	1–1
Espeland (Trettenes, Rosseli Olsen) (EA) – 41:08	2–1
M. Olimb (K. Olimb) – 59:00	3–1

16 min
Penalties
2 min
27
Shots
27

=== Canada vs Finland ===
1 June 2021; 12:15	Canada	2–3 GWS (1–0, 1–1, 0–1) (OT: 0–0) (SO: 0–1)	Finland	Arena Riga, Riga

Game reference

Darcy Kuemper
Goalies
Juho Olkinuora
Referees:
(Sweden) Tobias Björk
(Sweden) Mikael Nord
Linesmen:
(Sweden) Ludvig Lundgren
(Sweden) Emil Yletyinen

Pirri (Vilardi, Ferraro) – 01:30	1–0
	1–1	21:11 – Ruotsalainen
Comtois (Brown, Mangiapane) (PP) – 28:18	2–1
	2–2	56:00 – Ruotsalainen (Lundell, Ojamäki)

Pirri
Perfetti (miss)
Vilardi (miss)
Henrique
Brown (miss)
Shootout
(miss) Lundell
Kaski
Mäenalanen
Ruotsalainen
(miss) Pakarinen
2 min
Penalties
4 min
34
Shots
32

=== Italy vs United States ===
1 June 2021; 16:15	Italy	2–4 (0–3, 1–1, 1–0)	United States	Arena Riga, Riga

Game reference

Davide Fadani
Goalies
Jake Oettinger
Referees:
(Russia) Yevgeni Romasko
(Belarus) Max Sidorenko
Linesmen:
(Belarus) Dmitri Golyak
(Russia) Gleb Lazarev

	0–1	06:54 – Labanc (Shea)
	0–2	10:33 – Labanc (Beniers, Clendening)
	0–3	19:45 – Garland (Robertson, Tennyson)
Frigo (Trivellato) – 21:01	1–3
	1–4	29:54 – Garland
Giliati – 46:33	2–4

4 min
Penalties
6 min
11
Shots
43

=== Germany vs Latvia ===
1 June 2021; 20:15	Germany	2–1 (2–0, 0–1, 0–0)	Latvia	Arena Riga, Riga; Attendance: 934

Game reference

Mathias Niederberger
Goalies
Jānis Kalniņš
Referees:
(Finland) Lassi Heikkinen
(Finland) Kristian Vikman
Linesmen:
(Finland) Lauri Nikulainen
(Finland) Hannu Sormunen

Peterka (Seider) – 03:16	1–0
Noebels (Pföderl, Reichel) – 06:40	2–0
	2–1	25:55 – Ābols (Balinskis)

6 min
Penalties
4 min
21
Shots
24
