= 2021 IIHF World Championship playoff round =

The playoff round of the 2021 IIHF World Championship was held from 3 to 6 June 2021. The top four of each preliminary group qualified for the playoff round.

== Qualified teams ==
Group	Winners	Runners-up	Third place	Fourth place
A	ROC	Switzerland	Czech Republic	Slovakia
B	United States	Finland	Germany	Canada

=== Qualified teams' seedings ===
Quarter-finalists were paired according to their positions in the groups: the first-place team in each preliminary-round group played the fourth-place team of the other group, while the second-place team played the third-place team of the other group.

Semi-finalists are paired according to their seeding after the preliminary round, which is determined by the following criteria: 1) position in the group; 2) number of points; 3) goal difference; 4) number of goals scored for; 5) seeding number entering the tournament. The best-ranked semi-finalist plays against the lowest-ranked semi-finalist, while the second-best ranked semi-finalist plays the third-best ranked semi-finalist.

Rank	Team	Grp	Pos	Pts	GD	GF	Seed
1	United States	B	1	18	+13	21	6
2	ROC	A	1	17	+18	28	2
3	Finland	B	2	17	+9	19	3
4	Switzerland	A	2	15	+10	27	8
5	Czech Republic	A	3	13	+9	27	5
6	Germany	B	3	12	+8	22	7
7	Slovakia	A	4	12	−5	17	9
8	Canada	B	4	10	+1	19	1

== Bracket ==
There will be a re-seeding after the quarterfinals.

Quarterfinals
3 June
2B Finland	1
3A Czech Republic	0
3 June
2A Switzerland	2
3B Germany (GWS)	3
3 June
1B United States	6
4A Slovakia	1
3 June
1A ROC	1
4B Canada (OT)	2

Semifinals
5 June
3 Finland	2
6 Germany	1
5 June
1 United States	2
8 Canada	4

Final
6 June
3 Finland	2
8 Canada (OT)	3
Third place
6 June
1 United States	6
6 Germany	1

All times are local (UTC+3).

== Quarterfinals ==
3 June 2021; 16:15	Switzerland	2–3 GWS (1–0, 1–1, 0–1) (OT: 0–0) (SO: 0–1)	Germany	Olympic Sports Centre, Riga

Game reference

Leonardo Genoni
Goalies
Mathias Niederberger
Referees:
(Latvia) Andris Ansons
(Russia) Yevgeni Romasko
Linesmen:
(Russia) Gleb Lazarev
(Russia) Nikita Shalagin

Untersander (Alatalo, Kurashev) – 15:17	1–0
Herzog (Scherwey, Bertschy) – 33:26	2–0
	2–1	37:23 – Kühnhackl (Rieder, Nowak)
	2–2	59:16 – Gawanke (Kahun, Noebels) (EA)

Corvi (miss)
Andrighetto (miss)
Meier
Ambühl (miss)
Hofmann (miss)
Shootout
(miss) Plachta
(miss) Krämmer
Kahun
(miss) Reichel
Noebels
0 min
Penalties
14 min
22
Shots
41

3 June 2021; 16:15	United States	6–1 (3–0, 1–1, 2–0)	Slovakia	Arēna Rīga, Riga

Game reference

Cal Petersen
Goalies
Adam Húska
Referees:
(Germany) André Schrader
(Switzerland) Michael Tscherrig
Linesmen:
(Germany) Jonas Merten
(Switzerland) David Obwegeser

Boyle – 13:08	1–0
Blackwell (Labanc, Robinson) – 15:25	2–0
Garland (Moore, Jones) – 19:30	3–0
	3–1	32:12 – Cehlárik (Lantoši)
Blackwell (Robinson, Labanc) – 36:50	4–1
Chmelevski (Wolanin) – 45:15	5–1
Garland (Wolanin, Moore) – 58:45	6 –1

6 min
Penalties
6 min
33
Shots
28

3 June 2021; 20:15	ROC	1–2 OT (0–0, 1–0, 0–1) (OT: 0–1)	Canada	Olympic Sports Centre, Riga

Game reference

Sergei Bobrovsky
Goalies
Darcy Kuemper
Referees:
(Sweden) Tobias Björk
(Sweden) Mikael Nord
Linesmen:
(Czech Republic) Daniel Hynek
(Czech Republic) Jiří Ondráček

Timkin (Orlov, Kamenev) – 34:32	1–0
	1–1	45:03 – Henrique (Brown, Comtois) (PP)
	1–2	62:12 – Mangiapane (Stecher)

6 min
Penalties
2 min
25
Shots
24

3 June 2021; 20:15	Finland	1–0 (0–0, 1–0, 0–0)	Czech Republic	Arēna Rīga, Riga

Game reference
Juho Olkinuora	Goalies	Šimon Hrubec	Referees: (United States) Andrew Bruggeman (Canada) Oliver Gouin; Linesmen: (Canada) Dustin McCrank (United States) Brian Oliver
Innala (Pakarinen, Kontiola) – 32:55 / 1–0			Referees: (United States) Andrew Bruggeman (Canada) Oliver Gouin; Linesmen: (Canada) Dustin McCrank (United States) Brian Oliver
12 min	Penalties	2 min	Referees: (United States) Andrew Bruggeman (Canada) Oliver Gouin; Linesmen: (Canada) Dustin McCrank (United States) Brian Oliver
24	Shots	28	Referees: (United States) Andrew Bruggeman (Canada) Oliver Gouin; Linesmen: (Canada) Dustin McCrank (United States) Brian Oliver

== Semifinals ==
5 June 2021; 14:15	United States	2–4 (1–1, 0–1, 1–2)	Canada	Arēna Rīga, Riga

Game reference

Cal Petersen
Goalies
Darcy Kuemper
Referees:
(United States) Andrew Bruggeman
(Canada) Oliver Gouin
Linesmen:
(Canada) Dustin McCrank
(United States) Brian Oliver

	0–1	02:02 – Pirri (Walker, Paul)
Blackwell (Wolanin, Labanc) – 17:17	1–1
	1–2	24:15 – Mangiapane (Brown)
	1–3	40:46 – Mangiapane (Brown, Kuemper)
Chmelevski (Rooney, Mackey) – 43:36	2–3
	2–4	59:36 – Danforth (Paul) (EN)

2 min
Penalties
0 min
38
Shots
33

5 June 2021; 18:15	Finland	2–1 (2–0, 0–1, 0–0)	Germany	Arēna Rīga, Riga

Game reference

Juho Olkinuora
Goalies
Mathias Niederberger
Referees:
(Sweden) Tobias Björk
(Sweden) Mikael Nord
Linesmen:
(Czech Republic) Daniel Hynek
(Czech Republic) Jiří Ondráček

Pakarinen (Lundell, Kaski) – 13:50	1–0
Björninen (Anttila) – 18:55	2–0
	2–1	31:03 – Plachta (Seider, Kahun) (PP)

8 min
Penalties
6 min
17
Shots
28

== Bronze medal game ==
6 June 2021; 15:15	United States	6–1 (1–0, 4–0, 1–1)	Germany	Arēna Rīga, Riga

Game reference

Cal Petersen
Goalies
Felix Brückmann
Referees:
(Finland) Lassi Heikkinen
(Finland) Kristian Vikman
Linesmen:
(Czech Republic) Daniel Hynek
(Czech Republic) Jiří Ondráček

Wolanin – 05:02	1–0
Garland (Robertson, Wolanin) – 26:27	2–0
Drury (Chmelevski) – 28:05	3–0
Robertson (Garland, Thompson) (PP) – 31:35	4–0
Moore (Garland, Thompson) (PP) – 32:15	5–0
	5–1	49:28 – Bittner (Plachta, Kahun)
Donato (Clendening, Thompson) – 49:53	6–1

43 min
Penalties
14 min
30
Shots
34

== Gold medal game ==
6 June 2021; 20:15	Finland	2–3 OT (1–0, 0–1, 1–1) (OT: 0–1)	Canada	Arena Riga, Riga

Game reference

Juho Olkinuora
Goalies
Darcy Kuemper
Referees:
(Czech Republic) Martin Fraňo
(Russia) Yevgeni Romasko
Linesmen:
(Russia) Gleb Lazarev
(Russia) Nikita Shalagin

Ruohomaa (Kaski) – 08:57	1–0
	1–1	24:30 – Comtois (Brown, Walker) (PP)
Lindbohm (Nousiainen, Ruohomaa) - 45:27	2–1
	2–2	52:37 – Henrique (Comtois, Brown) (PP)
	2–3	66:26 – Paul (Brown)

6 min
Penalties
30 min
31
Shots
26
