= 2021 IIHF World Championship final =

Ice hockey match

	1	2	3	OT	Total
Canada	0	1	1	1	3
Finland	1	0	1	0	2
- Date: 6 June 2021
- Arena: Arena Riga
- City: Riga

The 2021 IIHF World Championship final was played at the Arena Riga in Riga, Latvia, on 6 June 2021.

Canada and Finland met for the fifth time in the finals, and also for the second consecutive time, with Finland having won in 2019. Canada won 3–2 in overtime to claim their 27th title.

== Road to the final ==
Finland
Round
Canada
Opponent
Result
Preliminary round
Opponent
Result
United States
2–1
Game 1
Latvia
0–2
Kazakhstan
1–2 (GWS)
Game 2
United States
1–5
Norway
5–2
Game 3
Germany
1–3
Italy
3–0
Game 4
Norway
4–2
Germany
2–1
Game 5
Kazakhstan
4–2
Latvia
3–2 (OT)
Game 6
Italy
7–1
Canada
3–2 (GWS)
Game 7
Finland
2–3 (GWS)

Pos	Team	Pld	Pts
1	United States	7	18
2	Finland	7	17
3	Germany	7	12
4	Canada	7	10
5	Kazakhstan	7	10
6	Latvia (H)	7	9
7	Norway	7	8
8	Italy	7	0

Source: IIHF
(H) Host
Preliminary

Pos	Team	Pld	Pts
1	United States	7	18
2	Finland	7	17
3	Germany	7	12
4	Canada	7	10
5	Kazakhstan	7	10
6	Latvia (H)	7	9
7	Norway	7	8
8	Italy	7	0

Source: IIHF
(H) Host
Opponent
Result
Playoff
Opponent
Result
Czech Republic
1–0
Quarterfinals
ROC
2–1 (OT)
Germany
2–1
Semifinals
United States
4–2

== Match ==
6 June 2021; 20:15	Finland	2–3 OT (1–0, 0–1, 1–1) (OT: 0–1)	Canada	Arena Riga, Riga

Game reference

Juho Olkinuora
Goalies
Darcy Kuemper
Referees:
(Czech Republic) Martin Fraňo
(Russia) Yevgeni Romasko
Linesmen:
(Russia) Gleb Lazarev
(Russia) Nikita Shalagin

Ruohomaa (Kaski) – 08:57	1–0
	1–1	24:30 – Comtois (Brown, Walker) (PP)
Lindbohm (Nousiainen, Ruohomaa) - 45:27	2–1
	2–2	52:37 – Henrique (Comtois, Brown) (PP)
	2–3	66:26 – Paul (Brown)

6 min
Penalties
30 min
31
Shots
26
