= Alexei Maklyukov =

- Born: 19 September 1993 (age 33) Voskresensk, Russia
- Height: 1.88 m (6 ft 2 in)
- Weight: 82 kg (181 lb; 12 st 13 lb)
- Position: Defence
- Shoots: Left
- KHL team Former teams: SKA Saint Petersburg; Dynamo Moscow; Barys Astana; Metallurg Magnitogorsk
- National team: Kazakhstan
- Playing career: 2012–present

Alexei Romanovich Maklyukov (Russian: Алексей Романович Маклюков; born 19 September 1993) is a Russian professional ice hockey player for SKA Saint Petersburg in the Kontinental Hockey League (KHL).

He represented Kazakhstan at the 2021 IIHF World Championship.

== Awards and honors ==
Award	Year
KHL
Gagarin Cup (Metallurg Magnitogorsk)	2024
