= Marco Magnabosco =

Italian ice hockey player

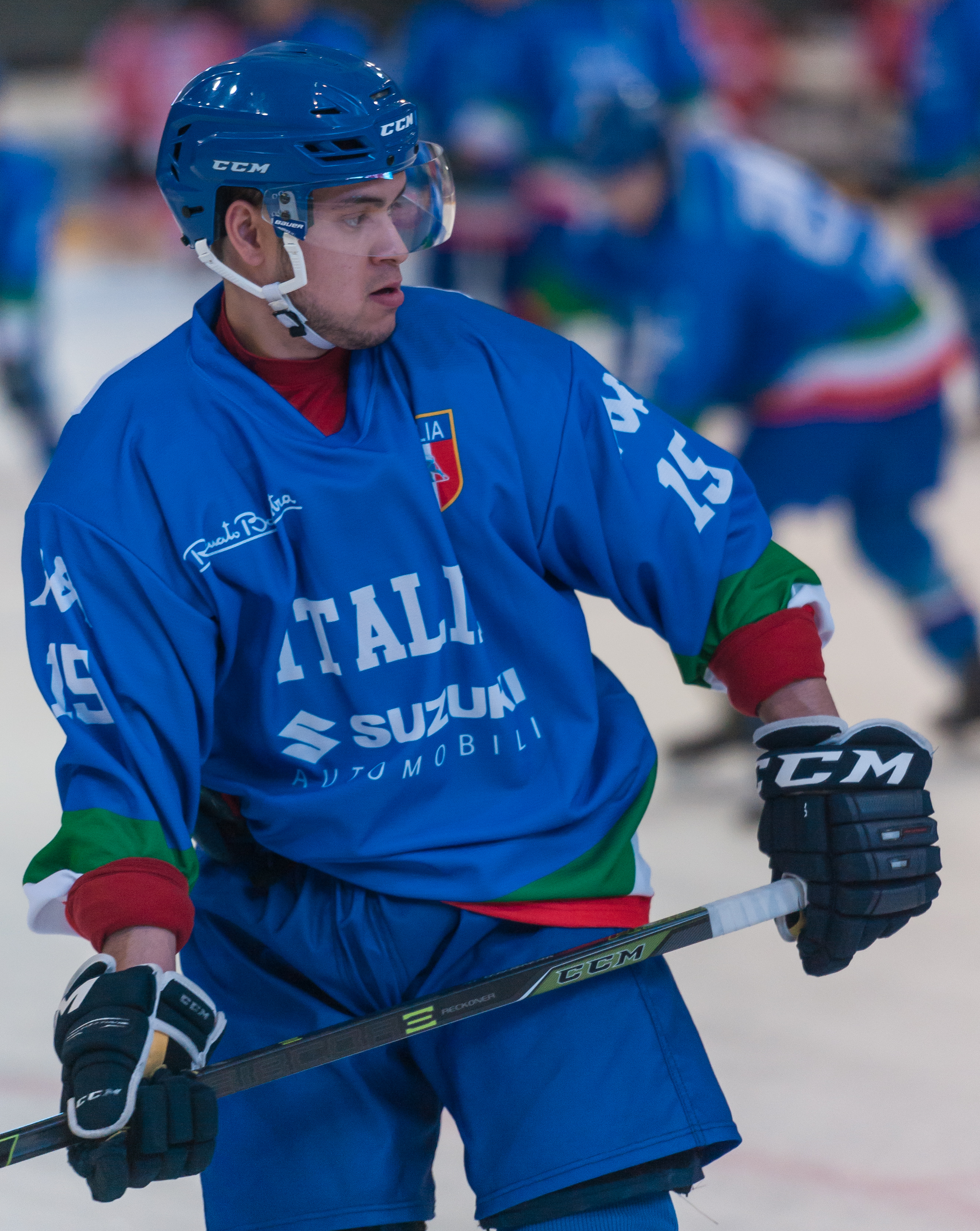
- Born: 12 August 1995 (age 31) Asiago, Italy
- Height: 1.74 m (5 ft 9 in)
- Weight: 73 kg (161 lb; 11 st 7 lb)
- Position: Right wing
- Shoots: Right
- AlpsHL team Former teams: Asiago Hockey 1935; Hockey Pergine
- National team: Italy
- NHL draft: Undrafted
- Playing career: 2013–present

Marco José Antonio Magnabosco Aguirre (born 12 August 1995 in Asiago) is an Italian ice hockey player and captain for Asiago Hockey 1935, and a player in the Italian national team.

He represented Italy at the 2021 IIHF World Championship.
