= Matt Tennyson =

American ice hockey player (born 1990)

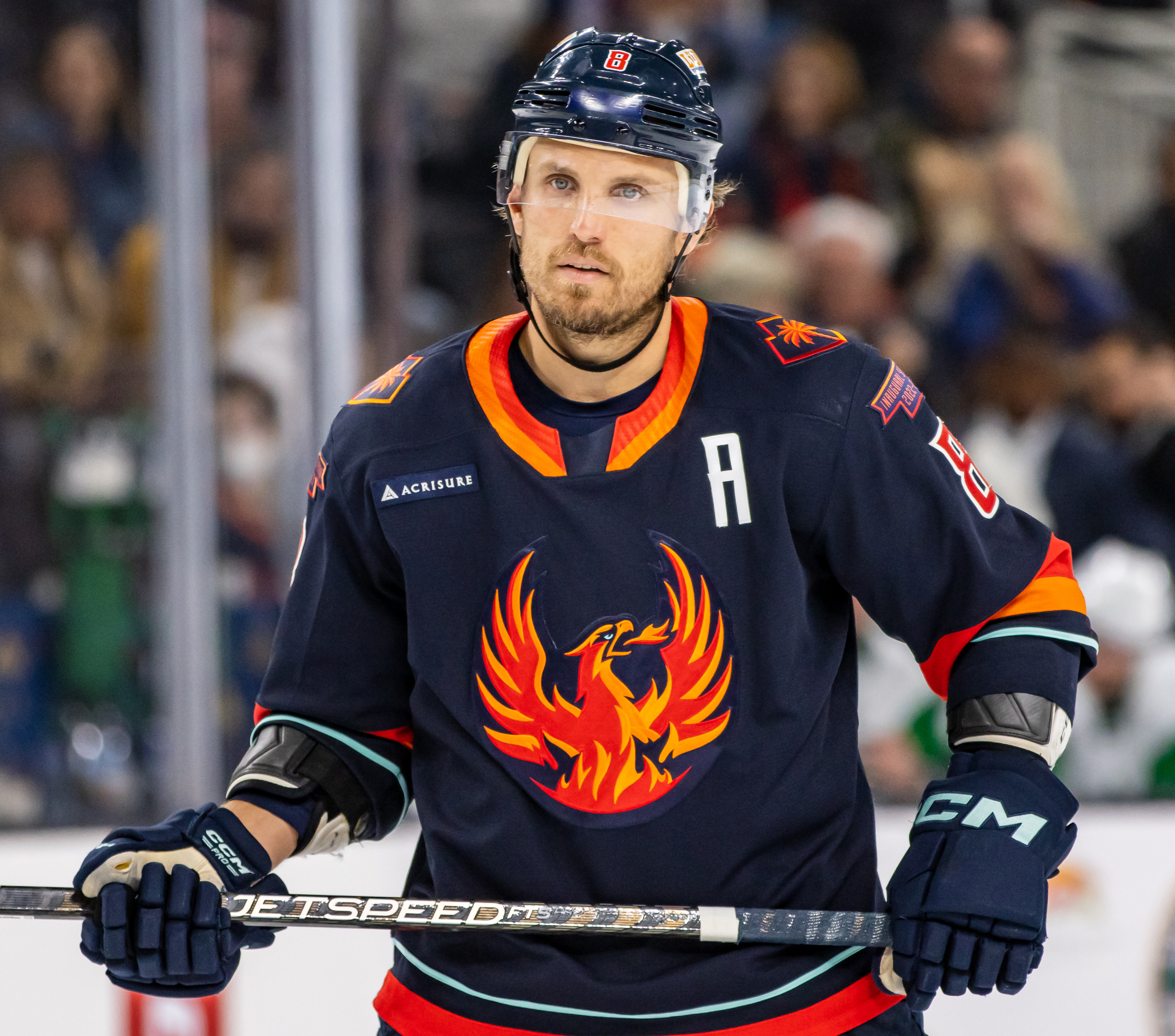
- Tennyson with the Coachella Valley Firebirds in 2023.
- Born: April 23, 1990 (age 36) Minneapolis, Minnesota, U.S.
- Height: 6 ft 2 in (188 cm)
- Weight: 205 lb (93 kg; 14 st 9 lb)
- Position: Defense
- Shoots: Right
- Played for: San Jose Sharks; Carolina Hurricanes; Buffalo Sabres; New Jersey Devils; Nashville Predators; HC Lugano
- National team: United States
- NHL draft: Undrafted
- Playing career: 2012–present

Matthew Thomas Tennyson (born April 23, 1990) is an American former professional ice hockey defenseman who played for 8 seasons in the National Hockey League for the San Jose Sharks, Carolina Hurricanes, Buffalo Sabres, New Jersey Devils, and Nashville Predators.

== Early life ==
Tennyson is the son of Tom and Ann Tennyson, and was born on April 23, 1990, in Minneapolis. Tennyson graduated from Amador Valley High School in 2008.

== Playing career ==
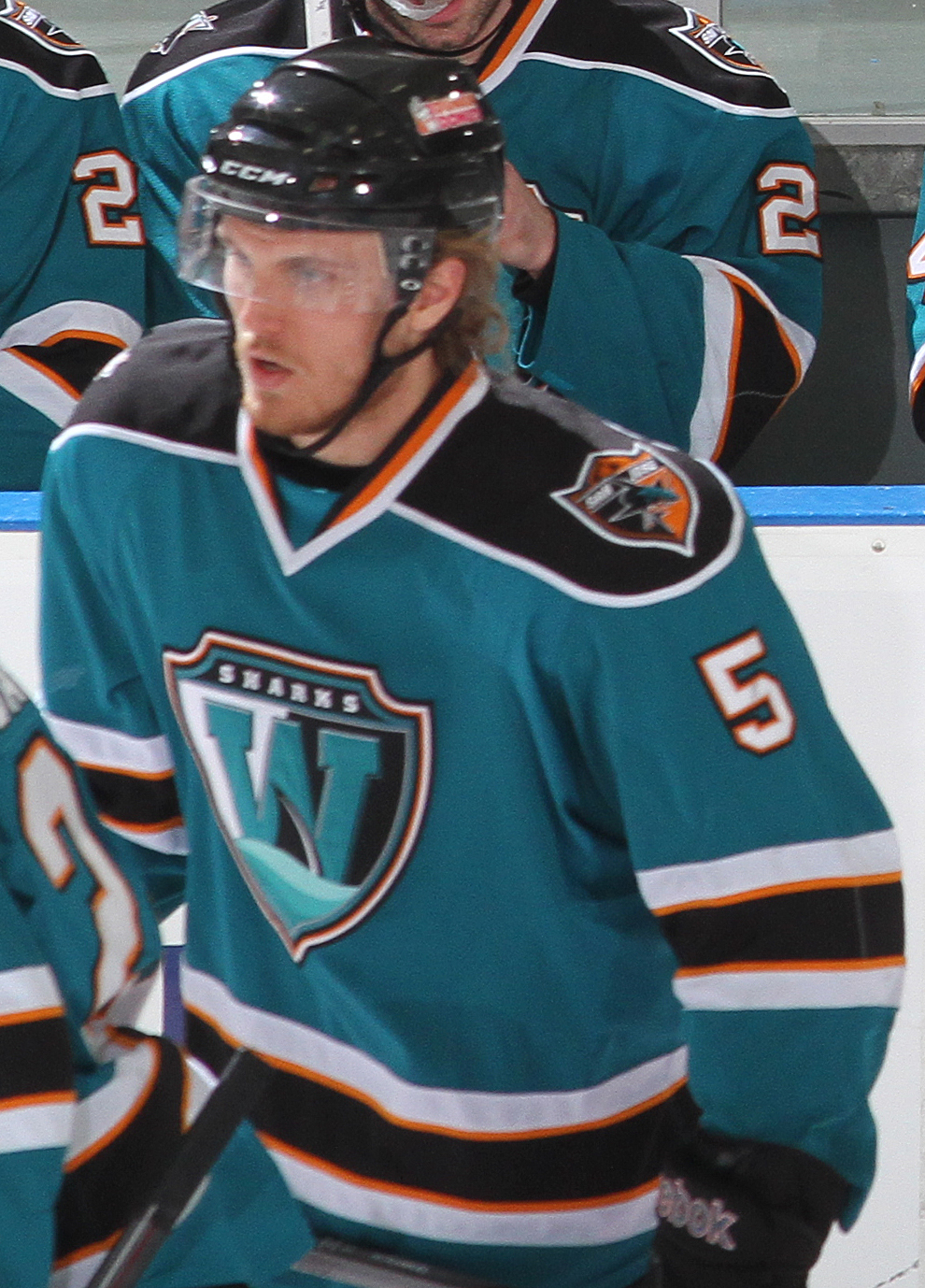
Tennyson with the Worcester Sharks.

Undrafted, Tennyson attended Western Michigan University where he played three seasons of NCAA Division I college hockey with the Western Michigan Broncos men's ice hockey team. On March 30, 2012, Tennyson, a native of Pleasanton, California, signed a two-year entry-level contract with his hometown San Jose Sharks. He immediately turned professional to join the Worcester Sharks for the final games of their 2011–12 AHL season.

Tennyson was the first player from the San Jose Junior Sharks youth hockey program to play in the NHL, let alone with the Sharks.

On July 3, 2016, Tennyson signed as a free agent to a one-year, two-way contract with the Carolina Hurricanes. Beginning the 2016–17 season with AHL affiliate, the Charlotte Checkers, Tennyson was recalled after recording 7 points in 9 games to remain with the Hurricanes for the remainder of the season. He appeared in a career best 45 games, collecting 6 assists.

On July 1, 2017, Tennyson was on the move as a free agent, agreeing to a two-year contract with the final year on a one-way basis with the Buffalo Sabres. On November 30, the Sabres placed Tennyson on waivers after 14 scoreless games with the club. He went unclaimed and was reassigned to AHL affiliate, the Rochester Americans.

On July 1, 2019, Tennyson left the Sabres as a free agent to sign a two-year, two-way contract with the New Jersey Devils. In the opening stages of the 2019–20 season, on October 11, Tennyson was called up from the Binghamton Devils to the New Jersey Devils in place of Andy Greene who was put on the injured reserve list with an upper body injury.

On July 28, 2021, Tennyson signed as a free agent to a two-year, two-way contract with the Nashville Predators. Tennyson featured in 8 regular season games with the Predators through the 2021–22 season, posting 3 assists. He played the majority of the season with AHL affiliate, the Milwaukee Admirals, adding a veteran presence to the blueline in 53 games.

On July 3, 2022, Tennyson was mutually released from the remaining year of his contract with the Predators after he was placed on unconditional waivers.

On September 1, 2022, it was announced that Tennyson signed for the Coachella Valley Firebirds inaugural season in Palm Desert, California, for the 2022–23 season.

On January 30, 2024, it was announced via Instagram that Tennyson would be joining the Coachella Valley Firebirds broadcast team as an analyst and brand ambassador, effectively ending his playing career.

== Career statistics ==
=== Regular season and playoffs ===
			Regular season					Playoffs
Season	Team	League	GP	G	A	Pts	PIM	GP	G	A	Pts	PIM
2007–08	Texas Tornado	NAHL	58	4	10	14	80	3	0	0	0	4
2008–09	Cedar Rapids RoughRiders	USHL	57	4	6	10	51	5	0	0	0	2
2009–10	Western Michigan University	CCHA	34	2	7	9	30	—	—	—	—	—
2010–11	Western Michigan University	CCHA	42	9	12	21	38	—	—	—	—	—
2011–12	Western Michigan University	CCHA	41	11	13	24	28	—	—	—	—	—
2011–12	Worcester Sharks	AHL	7	1	1	2	0	—	—	—	—	—
2012–13	Worcester Sharks	AHL	60	5	22	27	44	—	—	—	—	—
2012–13	San Jose Sharks	NHL	4	0	2	2	2	—	—	—	—	—
2013–14	Worcester Sharks	AHL	54	7	14	21	33	—	—	—	—	—
2014–15	Worcester Sharks	AHL	43	4	11	15	30	4	0	0	0	0
2014–15	San Jose Sharks	NHL	27	2	6	8	16	—	—	—	—	—
2015–16	San Jose Sharks	NHL	29	1	3	4	0	—	—	—	—	—
2015–16	San Jose Barracuda	AHL	5	0	0	0	0	1	0	0	0	2
2016–17	Charlotte Checkers	AHL	9	3	4	7	5	—	—	—	—	—
2016–17	Carolina Hurricanes	NHL	45	0	6	6	6	—	—	—	—	—
2017–18	Buffalo Sabres	NHL	15	0	0	0	8	—	—	—	—	—
2017–18	Rochester Americans	AHL	50	3	8	11	40	3	0	0	0	6
2018–19	Rochester Americans	AHL	47	4	17	21	42	3	0	0	0	0
2018–19	Buffalo Sabres	NHL	4	0	0	0	0	—	—	—	—	—
2019–20	Binghamton Devils	AHL	25	1	8	9	20	—	—	—	—	—
2019–20	New Jersey Devils	NHL	20	0	3	3	6	—	—	—	—	—
2020–21	New Jersey Devils	NHL	21	1	2	3	2	—	—	—	—	—
2020–21	Binghamton Devils	AHL	5	0	2	2	4	—	—	—	—	—
2021–22	Milwaukee Admirals	AHL	53	3	11	14	44	3	0	0	0	0
2021–22	Nashville Predators	NHL	8	0	3	3	4	—	—	—	—	—
2022–23	Coachella Valley Firebirds	AHL	71	0	18	18	66	26	0	3	3	28
NHL totals			173	4	25	29	44	—	—	—	—	—

Medal record

Representing United States

Ice hockey

World Championships
Bronze medal – third place	2021 Latvia	

=== International ===
Year	Team	Event	Result	GP	G	A	Pts	PIM
2021	United States	WC	3rd place, bronze medalist(s)	10	2	2	4	4
Senior totals				10	2	2	4	4

== Awards and honors ==
Award	Year
College
All-CCHA Second Team	2011–12
