= Yegor Shalapov =

- Born: 27 January 1995 (age 30); Kusa, Russia
- Height: 1.81 m (5 ft 11 in)
- Weight: 82 kg (181 lb; 12 st 13 lb)
- Position: Defence
- Shoots: Right
- VHL team Former teams: HC Tambov; Barys Astana
- National team: Kazakhstan
- Playing career: 2013–present

Yegor Vyacheslavovich Shalapov (Russian: Егор Вячеславович Шалапов; born 27 January 1995) is a Kazakhstani ice hockey player for HC Tambov in the Supreme Hockey League (VHL). He has previously played with Barys Astana in the Kontinental Hockey League (KHL) and the Kazakhstani national team.

He represented Kazakhstan at the 2021 IIHF World Championship.
