= Tony Sund =

Finnish ice hockey player

- Born: 4 August 1995 (age 31) Pedersöre, Finland
- Height: 1.92 m (6 ft 4 in)
- Weight: 93 kg (205 lb; 14 st 9 lb)
- Position: Defence
- Shoots: Left
- Liiga team Former teams: HIFK; Vaasan Sport; HC TPS; Dinamo Riga; HC Davos; Rögle BK
- National team: Finland
- NHL draft: Undrafted
- Playing career: 2012–present
Medal record
World Championships
Silver medal – second place	2021 Latvia

Tony Sund (born 4 August 1995) is a Finnish professional ice hockey defenceman for HIFK of Liiga. Internationally, he represented the Finnish national team.

He was signed as an undrafted free agent by the San Jose Sharks on 9 May 2019, and represented Finland at the 2021 IIHF World Championship.

On March 3, 2023, Sund's NHL rights were traded to the Montreal Canadiens as part of a three-team trade.
