= Connor Brown (ice hockey) =

Canadian ice hockey player (born 1994)

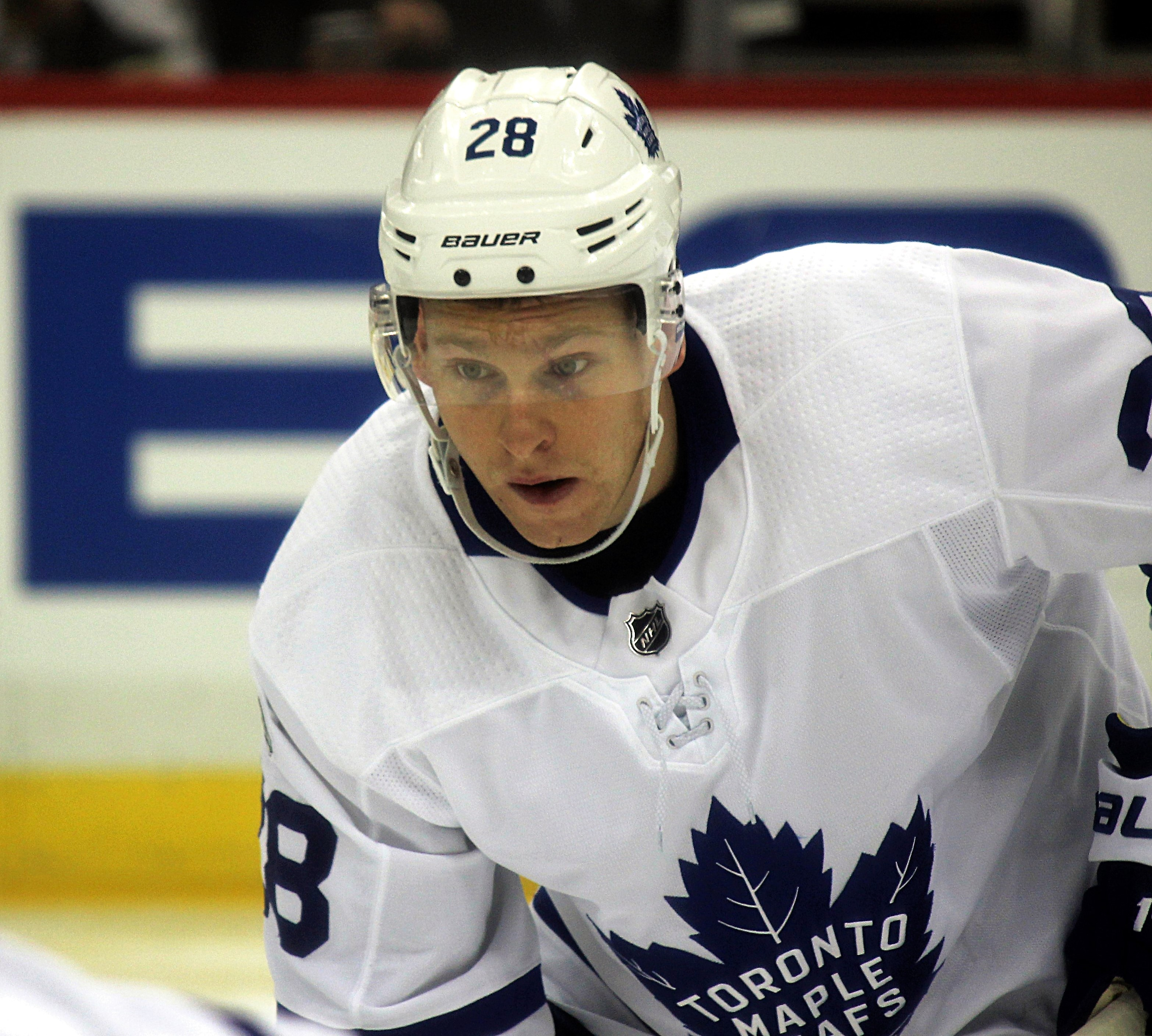
- Brown with the Toronto Maple Leafs in 2017
- Born: January 14, 1994 (age 32) Etobicoke, Ontario, Canada
- Height: 6 ft 0 in (183 cm)
- Weight: 184 lb (83 kg; 13 st 2 lb)
- Position: Right wing
- Shoots: Right
- NHL team Former teams: New Jersey Devils; Toronto Maple Leafs; Ottawa Senators; Washington Capitals; Edmonton Oilers
- National team: Canada
- NHL draft: 156th overall, 2012; Toronto Maple Leafs
- Playing career: 2014–present

Connor Brown (born January 14, 1994) is a Canadian professional ice hockey player who is a right winger for the New Jersey Devils of the National Hockey League (NHL). Brown was selected by the Toronto Maple Leafs in the sixth round, 156th overall, of the 2012 NHL entry draft. Brown played for the Erie Otters of the Ontario Hockey League (OHL) from 2011 until 2014, then for the American Hockey League (AHL)'s Toronto Marlies for the better part of two seasons before joining the Toronto Maple Leafs full-time in the 2016–17 season. He played for two more years with Toronto before he was traded to the Ottawa Senators in 2019. Brown spent three seasons with the Senators where he was an alternate captain. He was traded to the Washington Capitals heading into the 2022–23 season, but only played four games before suffering an anterior cruciate ligament injury. He then signed with the Oilers as a free agent in 2023.

== Playing career ==
=== Amateur ===
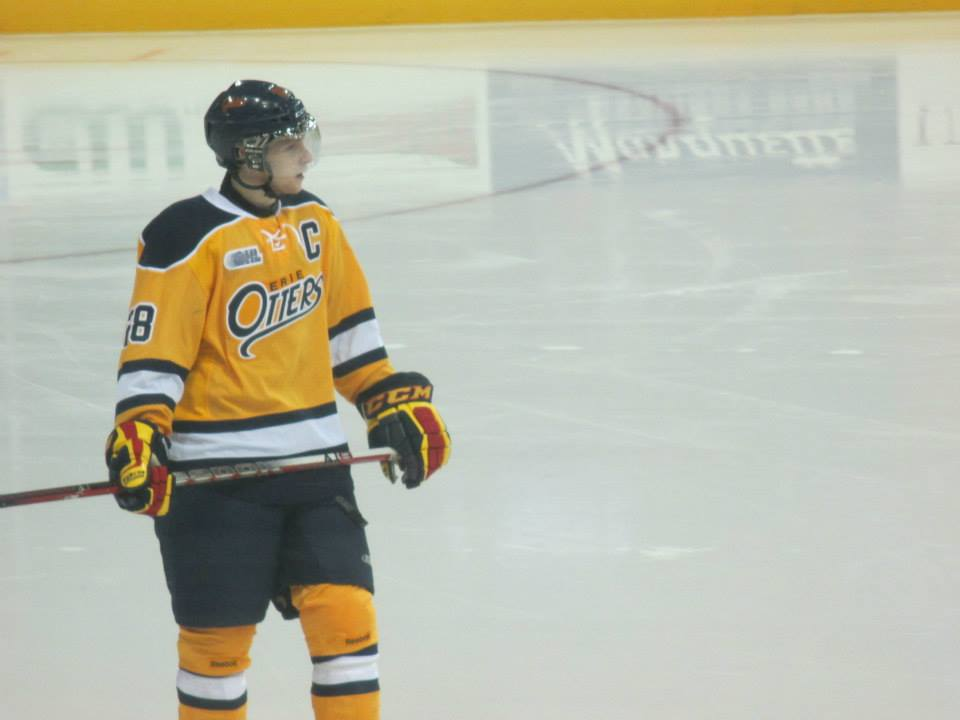
Brown played for the Erie Otters for his major junior career

Brown grew up playing youth ice hockey in the Toronto area. He played first for the West Mall Lightning mite select team, in the North York Hockey League, where his father was the head coach. The Lightning team later morphed in the Greater Toronto Hockey League (GTHL)'s Toronto Marlboros team for players born in 1994. The core of the team won 10-straight city championships and included seven players who would go on to be selected by NHL teams at the 2012 NHL entry draft: Brown, Scott Laughton, Matt Finn, Adam Pelech, Scott Kosmachuk, Jake Paterson and Matia Marcantuoni. Brown was selected in the 13th round, 251st overall, by the Ontario Hockey League (OHL)'s Erie Otters in the 2010 OHL Priority Draft. He spent the 2010–11 season playing Junior "A" level for the St. Michael's Buzzers of the Ontario Junior Hockey League (OJHL), appearing in 49 games, recording 17 goals, 22 assists and 39 points.

Brown joined the Otters for the 2011–12 season and led the team in points (53), goals (25) and assists (28), and was named to the OHL's All-Rookie Team. However, he recorded a plus-minus of –72. The plus-minus was primarily a result of an Otters team that finished last in the OHL, resulting in the franchise drafting first overall in the OHL draft and selecting future NHL star Connor McDavid. Brown returned to the Otters for the 2012–13 season, serving as the captain of the team. He recorded 28 goals, 41 assists and 69 points in 68 games that season for the team, again leading the team in scoring and his plus-minus improved to –11.

Brown spent the 2013–14 season on a line with Connor McDavid, recording 45 goals and 83 assists for 128 points in 68 games. He went on to put up eight goals and 10 assists in 14 games during the playoffs to cap off what was the best season in team's history. Brown was awarded both the Jim Mahon Memorial Trophy as the OHL's top scoring right winger, and the Eddie Powers Memorial Trophy as the top scoring player, and the Red Tilson Trophy as the OHL's outstanding player. At the time of his departure, he held the Otters franchise record for most points in a single season; his record has since been passed by former linemate Dylan Strome, who surpassed it by one point the following season.

=== Professional ===
==== Toronto Maple Leafs ====
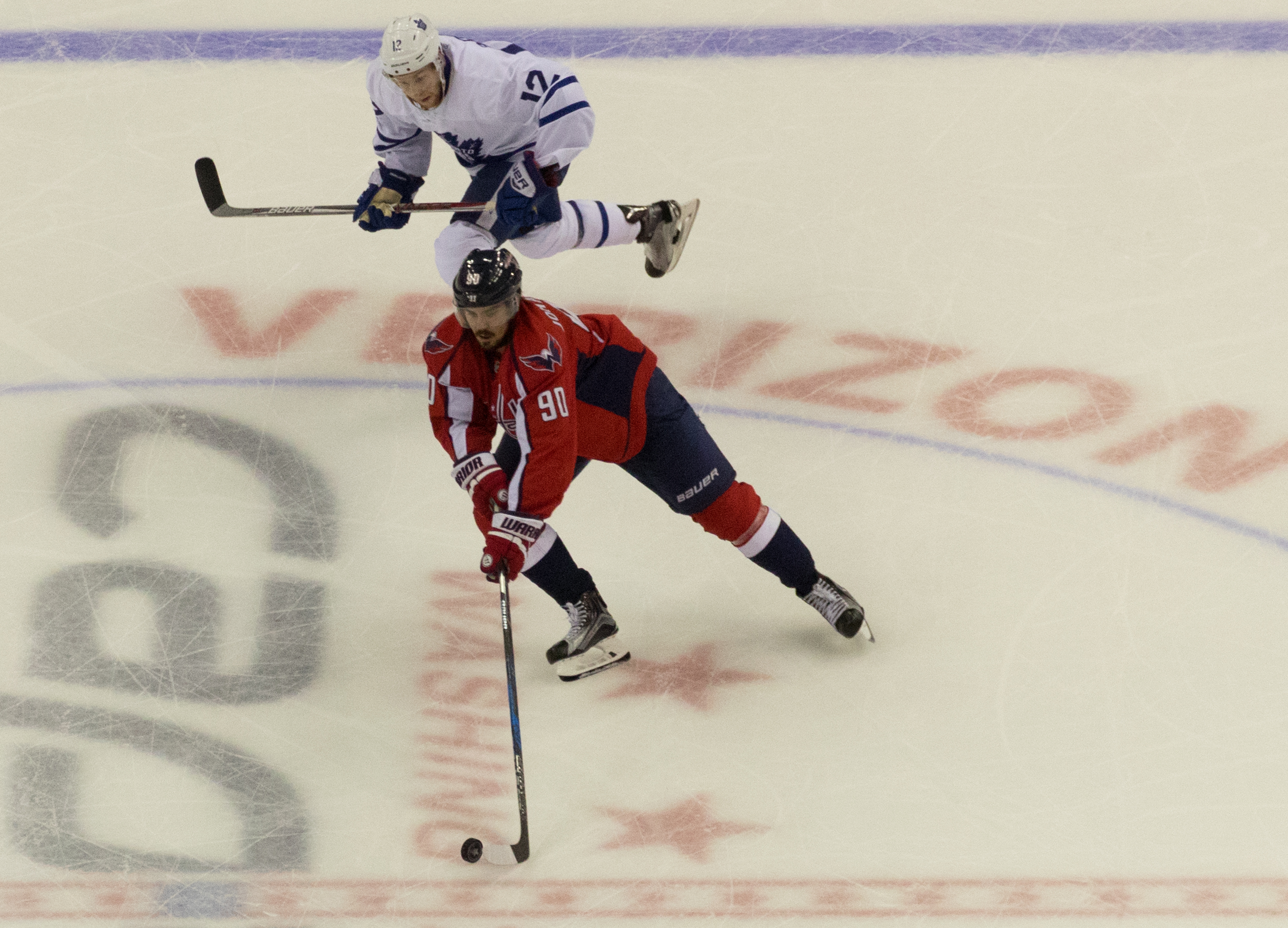
Brown (top) defends against Marcus Johansson (foreground) of the Washington Capitals during the 2017 Stanley Cup playoffs

Brown entered the 2012 NHL entry draft and was selected in the sixth round, 156th overall, by his hometown Toronto Maple Leafs. Brown's offensive talent led the Maple Leafs to select him, but his small stature and historically bad plus-minus caused the pick to be called a "gamble". On November 22, 2013, Brown signed a three-year, entry-level contract with the Maple Leafs. In his first year with the Maple Leafs' American Hockey League (AHL) affiliate, the Toronto Marlies, he was voted into the AHL's All-Star Game starting roster as the team's only representative. He won the AHL rookie scoring title, finishing the regular season with 21 goals and 40 assists in 76 games. The Marlies made the 2015 Calder Cup playoffs and in five games, Brown recorded five points (one goal and four assists). The Marlies were eliminated in the first round by the Grand Rapids Griffins, despite winning the first two games. For his efforts, he was named the AHL's Rookie of the Year, and their All-Rookie Team.

Brown almost made the Maple Leafs' NHL roster out of training camp for the 2015–16 season, but was assigned to the AHL to further his development. In the eighth game of the season on October 30, 2015, Brown broke his ankle blocking a shot and missed 34 games before returning to the Marlies' lineup in January 2016. He appeared in 34 games with the Marlies, recording 11 goals and 29 points. He would be called up to the Maple Leafs late in the season as part of an initiative by the team to give AHL rookies some late season experience. Brown made his NHL debut on March 17, against the Florida Panthers, and scored his first NHL goal on March 24, against the Anaheim Ducks. On March 29, he registered three assists in a game versus the Florida Panthers, setting up goals by Nazem Kadri and Michael Grabner. Brown made seven appearances with Toronto, scoring the one goal and adding six assists for seven points. He was returned to the Marlies for their 2016 Calder Cup playoffs run, appearing in 15 playoff games and scoring seven goals and nine points. The Marlies made it to the AHL's conference finals, but were eliminated in five games by the Hershey Bears.

Brown made the Maple Leafs' roster full-time for the 2016–17 season. However, a deep presence of forward depth meant Brown was playing on the fourth line with Matt Martin, though he saw time on the penalty kill. After five games in a limited role, Maple Leafs veteran forward Milan Michálek was placed on waivers in order to make room and give Brown a larger role on the team. Former Maple Leaf Ben Smith rejoined the team via waivers in order to take Brown's former spot. Brown played the rest of the year mostly on a line with Nazem Kadri and Leo Komarov, collecting 20 goals and compiling 36 points. The Maple Leafs made the 2016 Stanley Cup playoffs and Brown made his playoff debut on April 16, 2017, in the game 1 loss to the Washington Capitals in the opening round. He registered his first playoff point assisting on Auston Matthews' third period goal in a 5–4 loss to the Capitals on April 19. The Maple Leafs were eliminated by the Capitals in six games. He appeared in all six games with just the one point.

On August 26, 2017, as a restricted free agent, Brown signed a new three-year, $6.3 million contract with Toronto worth $2.1 million annually. In the following 2017–18 season, he played in all 82 games, scoring 14 goals and 28 points. Toronto made the 2018 Stanley Cup playoffs and in the first round, faced the Boston Bruins. Playing on a line with Auston Matthews and William Nylander, he scored his first NHL playoff goal in a 4–3 victory in game 5 of the series on April 22, 2018. The Bruins eliminated the Maple Leafs in seven games. He played in all seven games, recording one goal and three points. During the 2018–19 season, Brown scored eight goals and 29 points in 82 games. He marked his second career three-assist game on December 18, setting up goals by Morgan Rielly and Tyler Ennis. Toronto again faced Boston in the first round of the 2019 Stanley Cup playoffs, who again eliminated the Maple Leafs in seven games. Brown had just one assist in the seven games.

==== Ottawa Senators ====
On July 1, 2019, Brown was traded, along with Nikita Zaitsev and Michael Carcone, to the Ottawa Senators in exchange for Cody Ceci, Ben Harpur, Aaron Luchuk and a third-round pick in the 2020 NHL entry draft. In Ottawa, Brown saw an expanded role after falling down the depth chart in Toronto. He made his debut for the Senators on opening day of the 2019–20 season versus Toronto and assisted on Brady Tkachuk's goal in the first period. He scored his first goal for Ottawa in a 5–2 victory over the San Jose Sharks on October 27, and also assisted on Nick Paul's second goal of the game. Brown finished the season second on the team in scoring, with 16 goals and 43 points in 71 games. The NHL suspended the season due to the COVID-19 pandemic on March 12, 2020, and since the Senators were a rebuilding team with a losing record, were not invited to the qualifying round of the 2020 Stanley Cup playoffs.

On October 22, Brown re-signed as a restricted free agent with the Senators, for three years at an average annual value of $3.6 million. During the pandemic-shortened 2020–21 season, he finished the season with 21 goals and 35 points in 56 games. Brown set the Senators franchise record that season for consecutive games with a goal with seven, set on April 10, 2021. On April 20, Brown scored two goals in a 4–2 win over the Calgary Flames. On May 8, Brown registered a three-point game, scoring one goal and assisting on two of Tim Stützle's three goals in a 4–2 victory over the Winnipeg Jets. The Senators failed to make the playoffs.

During the 2021–22 season, Brown recorded only 10 goals and 39 points in 64 games. He tied his career-high of three assists in a game on October 17, 2021, setting up goals by Nick Paul and both scored by Chris Tierney. The Senators missed the playoffs for the fifth straight season.

==== Washington Capitals ====
Following his third season with the Senators, Brown was traded on the opening day of free agency on July 13, 2022, to the Washington Capitals in exchange for a second-round draft pick in 2024 NHL entry draft. After only playing four games with the Capitals in the 2022–23 season, Brown suffered an anterior cruciate ligament (ACL) injury that required surgery. Capitals' head coach Peter Laviolette announced Brown would likely miss the rest of the year.

==== Edmonton Oilers ====
As an unrestricted free agent at the conclusion of his contract with the Capitals and missing most of the previous season, Brown signed a one-year, $4 million contract with the Edmonton Oilers for the 2023–24 season on July 1, 2023. He made his Oilers debut on October 12, in an 8–1 loss to the Vancouver Canucks. He struggled to start the season, still recovering from the time off following the knee injury. He ended his personal 72-game goal drought scoring his first goal with the Oilers on March 13, 2024, in a 7–2 victory over the Capitals, in turn receiving a standing ovation from the crowd. On March 6, Adam Henrique was acquired by the Oilers and with Mattias Janmark, the three formed a third line that was a key to the Oilers' playoff success. He finished the season with four goals and 12 points in 71 games. The Oilers made the 2024 Stanley Cup playoffs and advanced to the Stanley Cup Final against the Florida Panthers. The penalty kill unit, which Brown was a part of, finished with the playoffs with a league-leading 98.6% success rate. The Oilers were ultimately defeated in seven games by the Panthers, with Brown recording two goals and six points in 19 playoff games,. Brown was re-signed to a one-year, $1 million contract by the Oilers for the 2024–25 season on July 1, 2024.

==== New Jersey Devils ====
As an unrestricted free agent, Brown signed with the New Jersey Devils to a four-year, $12 million contract on July 1, 2025.

== International play ==
Medal record

Representing Canada

Men's ice hockey

World Championships
Gold medal – first place	2021 Latvia	

Brown was selected to play for Canada national team in the 2021 World Championship. Canada lost its first two games, but after Andrew Mangiapane joined the team and was placed on the first line with Brown and Henrique, the team's fortunes turned around. Brown assisted on all three Canada's goals in the championship game, including setting up Nick Paul to score the game-winning goal in overtime to secure the gold medal in a 3–2 victory over Finland national team.

== Personal life ==
Brown became engaged to his long-time girlfriend in January 2020, and were married in August 2021. Brown and his wife have one child.

== Career statistics ==
=== Regular season and playoffs ===
			Regular season					Playoffs
Season	Team	League	GP	G	A	Pts	PIM	GP	G	A	Pts	PIM
2009–10	Toronto Marlboros	GTHL	80	25	44	69	16	—	—	—	—	—
2010–11	St. Michael's Buzzers	OJHL	49	17	22	39	18	3	0	1	1	0
2011–12	Erie Otters	OHL	68	25	28	53	14	—	—	—	—	—
2012–13	Erie Otters	OHL	63	28	41	69	39	—	—	—	—	—
2013–14	Erie Otters	OHL	68	45	83	128	22	14	8	10	18	8
2014–15	Toronto Marlies	AHL	76	21	40	61	10	5	1	3	4	2
2015–16	Toronto Marlies	AHL	34	11	18	29	8	15	7	2	9	6
2015–16	Toronto Maple Leafs	NHL	7	1	5	6	0	—	—	—	—	—
2016–17	Toronto Maple Leafs	NHL	82	20	16	36	10	6	0	1	1	0
2017–18	Toronto Maple Leafs	NHL	82	14	14	28	18	7	1	2	3	0
2018–19	Toronto Maple Leafs	NHL	82	8	21	29	16	7	0	1	1	2
2019–20	Ottawa Senators	NHL	71	16	27	43	24	—	—	—	—	—
2020–21	Ottawa Senators	NHL	56	21	14	35	12	—	—	—	—	—
2021–22	Ottawa Senators	NHL	64	10	29	39	10	—	—	—	—	—
2022–23	Washington Capitals	NHL	4	0	0	0	0	—	—	—	—	—
2023–24	Edmonton Oilers	NHL	71	4	8	12	10	19	2	4	6	6
2024–25	Edmonton Oilers	NHL	82	13	17	30	10	20	5	4	9	2
2025–26	New Jersey Devils	NHL	75	18	25	43	22	—	—	—	—	—
NHL totals			676	125	176	301	132	59	8	12	20	10

=== International ===
Year	Team	Event	Result	GP	G	A	Pts	PIM
2021	Canada	WC	1st place, gold medalist(s)	10	2	14	16	2
2026	Canada	WC	4th	10	2	2	4	4
Senior totals				20	4	16	20	6

== Awards and honours ==
Award	Year	Ref
OHL
First All-Rookie Team	2012	
Jim Mahon Memorial Trophy	2014	
Eddie Powers Memorial Trophy	2014	
Red Tilson Trophy	2014	
First All-Star Team	2014	
AHL
AHL All-Star Game	2015	
AHL All-Rookie Team	2015	
