= Marco Nowak =

German ice hockey player (born 1990)

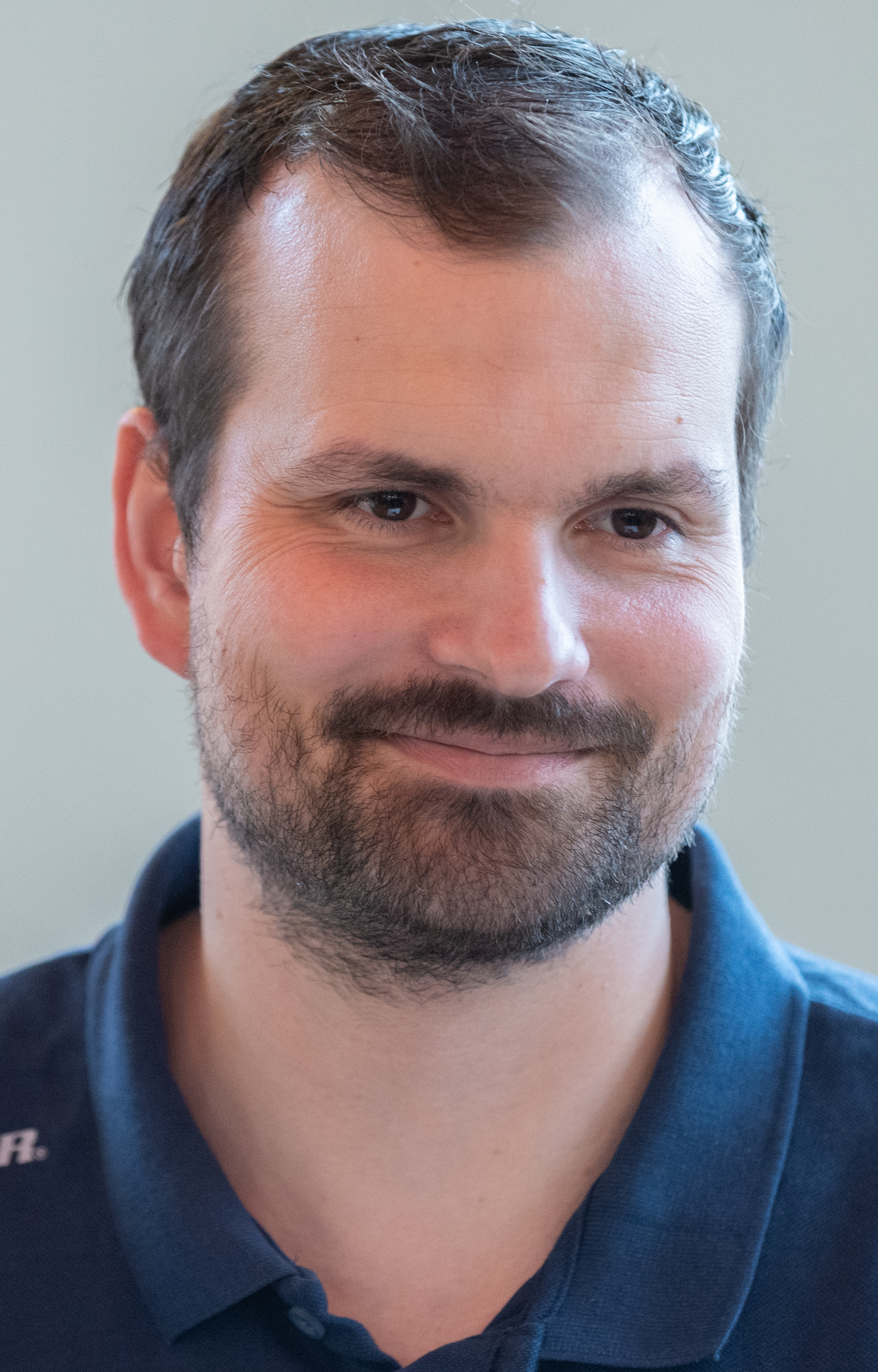
- Nowak in 2026
- Born: 23 July 1990 (age 35) Dresden, East Germany
- Height: 6 ft 2 in (188 cm)
- Weight: 205 lb (93 kg; 14 st 9 lb)
- Position: Defence
- Shoots: Right
- DEL team Former teams: Eisbären Berlin; Düsseldorfer EG; Nürnberg Ice Tigers
- National team: Germany
- Playing career: 2007–present

Marco Nowak (born 23 July 1990) is a German professional ice hockey defenceman who currently plays for Eisbären Berlin of the Deutsche Eishockey Liga (DEL). He has previously played with the DEG Metro Stars and Nürnberg Ice Tigers.

== International play ==
On 25 January 2022, Nowak was selected to play for Team Germany at the 2022 Winter Olympics.

== Career statistics ==
=== Regular season and playoffs ===
			Regular season					Playoffs
Season	Team	League	GP	G	A	Pts	PIM	GP	G	A	Pts	PIM
2006–07	Jungadler Mannheim	DNL	35	9	18	27	30	6	0	6	6	8
2007–08	DEG Metro Stars	DNL	16	7	11	18	8	1	0	0	0	2
2007–08	DEG Metro Stars	DEL	16	0	0	0	0	—	—	—	—	—
2007–08	DEG Metro Stars II	GER.4	9	5	3	8	12	—	—	—	—	—
2008–09	DEG Metro Stars	DEL	15	0	0	0	4	16	0	0	0	0
2008–09	Eispiraten Crimmitschau	GER.2	25	3	4	7	18	—	—	—	—	—
2009–10	DEG Metro Stars	DEL	38	0	1	1	25	3	0	0	0	0
2009–10	Eispiraten Crimmitschau	GER.2	14	1	4	5	18	—	—	—	—	—
2010–11	DEG Metro Stars	DEL	47	1	4	5	2	9	0	0	0	0
2011–12	DEG Metro Stars	DEL	50	3	1	4	66	7	0	0	0	0
2012–13	Thomas Sabo Ice Tigers	DEL	44	4	13	17	24	—	—	—	—	—
2013–14	Thomas Sabo Ice Tigers	DEL	19	0	4	4	14	6	0	0	0	2
2014–15	Thomas Sabo Ice Tigers	DEL	51	6	10	16	40	8	0	1	1	6
2015–16	Nürnberg Ice Tigers	DEL	42	5	4	9	24	9	1	2	3	4
2016–17	Düsseldorfer EG	DEL	50	3	17	20	32	—	—	—	—	—
2017–18	Düsseldorfer EG	DEL	40	1	12	13	32	—	—	—	—	—
2018–19	Düsseldorfer EG	DEL	51	4	15	19	24	7	0	2	2	12
2019–20	Düsseldorfer EG	DEL	26	1	9	10	18	—	—	—	—	—
2020–21	Düsseldorfer EG	DEL	38	3	8	11	26	—	—	—	—	—
2021–22	Düsseldorfer EG	DEL	43	4	18	22	28	—	—	—	—	—
2022–23	Eisbären Berlin	DEL	43	4	15	19	56	—	—	—	—	—
2023–24	Eisbären Berlin	DEL	32	1	4	5	12	3	0	3	3	0
DEL totals			645	40	135	175	427	68	1	8	9	24

=== International ===
Year	Team	Event	Result	GP	G	A	Pts	PIM
2008	Germany	WJC18	5th	6	0	0	0	2
2009	Germany	WJC	9th	6	1	0	1	2
2010	Germany	WJC D1	11th	5	0	3	3	8
2019	Germany	WC	6th	8	0	0	0	8
2021	Germany	WC	4th	10	0	2	2	0
2022	Germany	OG	10th	2	0	0	0	0
Junior totals				17	1	3	4	12
Senior totals				20	0	2	2	8

== Awards and honours ==
Award	Year
DEL
Champions (Eisbären Berlin)	2024
