= Conor Garland =

American ice hockey player (born 1996)

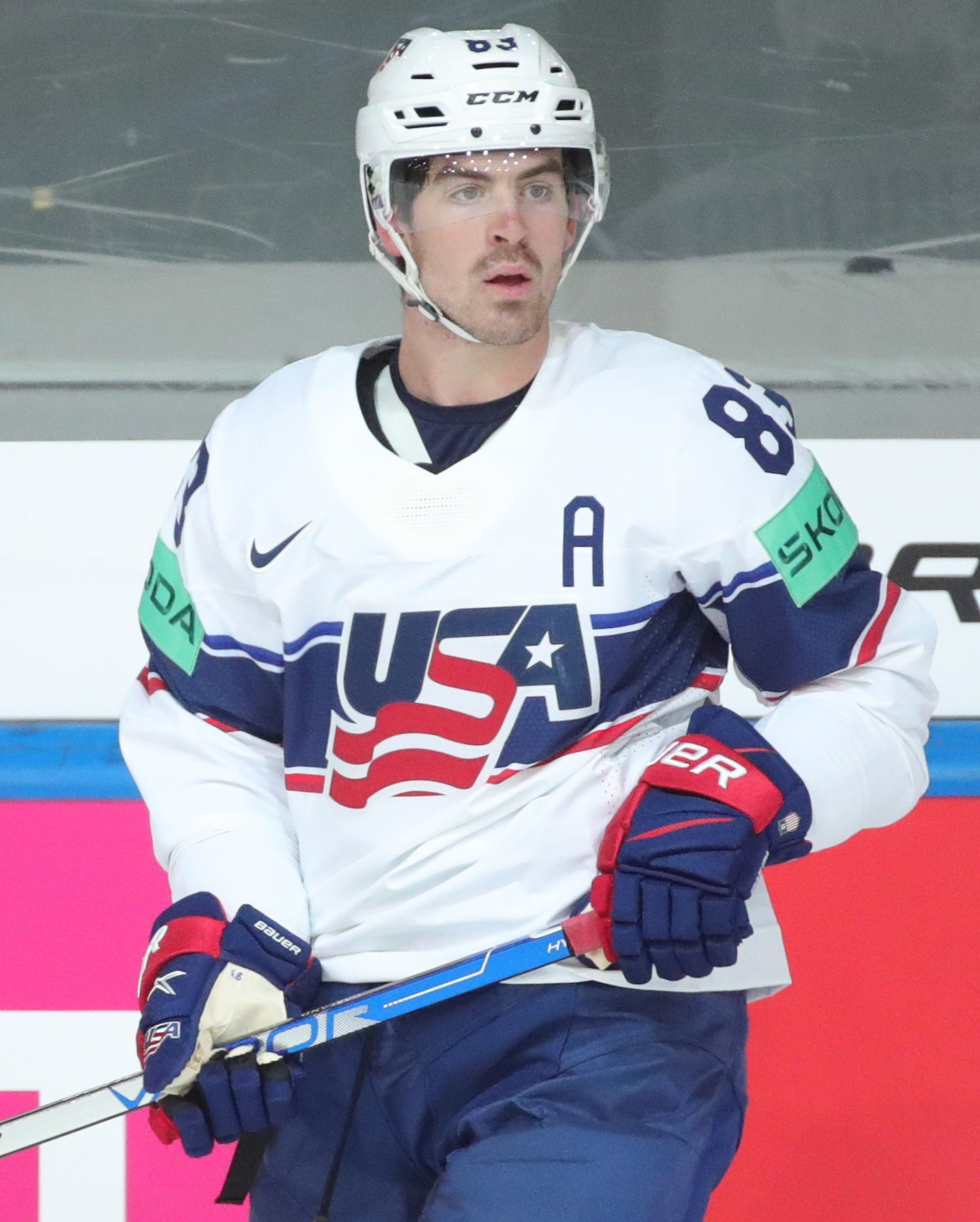
- Garland with the United States senior team in 2023
- Born: March 11, 1996 (age 30) Scituate, Massachusetts, U.S.
- Height: 5 ft 8 in (173 cm)
- Weight: 170 lb (77 kg; 12 st 2 lb)
- Position: Winger
- Shoots: Right
- NHL team Former teams: Columbus Blue Jackets; Arizona Coyotes; Vancouver Canucks
- National team: United States
- NHL draft: 123rd overall, 2015; Arizona Coyotes
- Playing career: 2016–present

Conor Garland (born March 11, 1996) is an American professional ice hockey player who is a winger for the Columbus Blue Jackets of the National Hockey League (NHL). Garland was drafted in the fifth round, 123rd overall, by the Arizona Coyotes in the 2015 NHL entry draft, and has also played in the NHL for the Vancouver Canucks.

Prior to turning professional, Garland played for the Moncton Wildcats of the Quebec Major Junior Hockey League (QMJHL) where he was awarded the Michel Brière Memorial Trophy as the QMJHL most valuable player and twice selected for the QMJHL First All-Star team. After a successful stint with the Coyotes' American Hockey League (AHL) affiliate, the Tucson Roadrunners, he played parts of three NHL seasons before the Coyotes traded him to the Canucks. Following a four-and-a-half-season stint in Vancouver, Garland was then traded to Columbus.

== Early life ==
Garland was born on March 11, 1996, in Scituate, Massachusetts, to parents Bridget, a train station foreman, and Garry, who was a collegiate ice hockey player. He also has three sisters, two of whom played collegiate lacrosse. Garland began skating at the age of four and attended skating clinics run by Michael Botticelli.

== Playing career ==
=== Youth ===
Growing up in Massachusetts, Garland played youth ice hockey with Boston Mission and Team Massachusetts. He then attended Shattuck-Saint Mary's, a boarding school in Minnesota, where he recorded 116 points in 52 games. At the age of 14, Garland was cut from their bantam team due to his height, and subsequently joined the Boston Junior Bruins of the Empire Junior Hockey League (EmJHL) for the 2011–12 season. Following his first season with the Junior Bruins, in which he recorded 94 points in 40 games, Garland was drafted in the sixth round of the 2012 Quebec Major Junior Hockey League (QMJHL) draft by the Moncton Wildcats.

After beginning the 2012–13 season with the Muskegon Lumberjacks of the United States Hockey League (USHL), Garland moved to playing for the Wildcats in the QMJHL, foregoing his NCAA eligibility.

=== Juniors ===
During the 2014–15 season, while playing with the Wildcats, Garland led both the QMJHL and Canadian Hockey League (CHL) with 129 points. He was named to the QMJHL First All-Star team, and was further honored when he was awarded the Michel Brière Memorial Trophy as the QMJHL most valuable player. Garland was then selected 123rd overall in the 2015 NHL entry draft by the Arizona Coyotes.

=== Arizona Coyotes ===
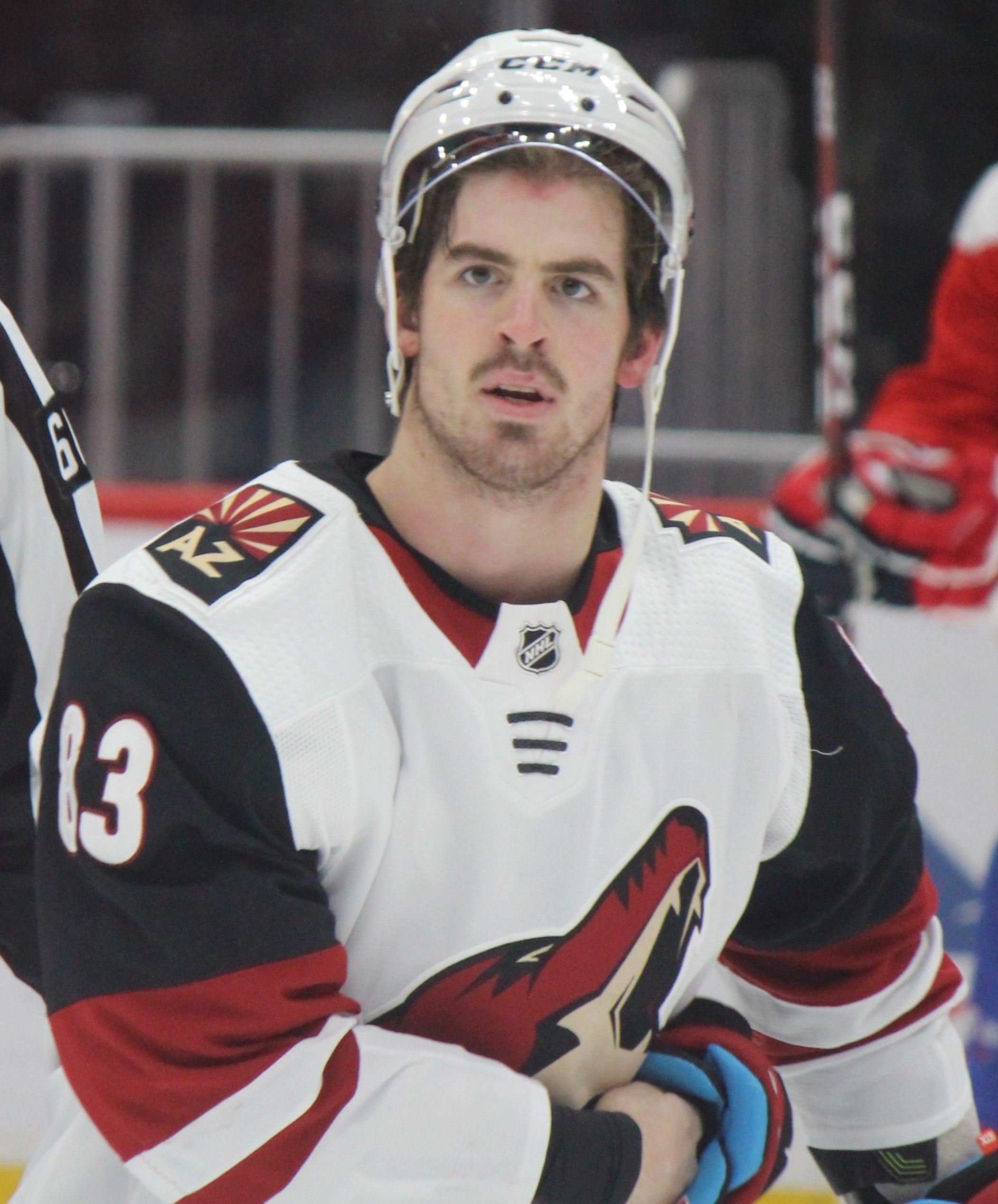
Garland with the Arizona Coyotes in 2019

While in his final season of junior level with the Wildcats, Garland was signed to a three-year, entry-level contract by the Coyotes on December 23, 2015. Following the conclusion of the season, Garland was invited to participate in the Coyotes' 2016 development camp, and remained in the state for the remainder of the off-season. Following camp, Garland was reassigned to the Coyotes' American Hockey League (AHL) affiliate, the Tucson Roadrunners, for the 2016–17 season. He recorded his first professional goal on December 2, 2016, against the San Diego Gulls.

After attending training camp, Garland was reassigned to the Roadrunners to begin the 2018–19 season. He led the team with 19 points before earning his first NHL call-up on December 3, 2018. His recall was due to his outstanding play at the AHL level and the belief that he minimized his bad habits from junior level and became a more complete player. He made his NHL debut on December 8, in a 5–3 loss to the San Jose Sharks. During his callup, he earned a top-line left-wing role alongside Nick Schmaltz and Clayton Keller. Through his first 36 games with the Coyotes, Garland accumulated 12 goals and three assists for 15 points and 10 penalty minutes. He also tied for third on the team in goals and power-play goals. Having established a role within the Coyotes, adding 12 goals in 35 games, Garland was signed to a two-year, $1.55 million contract extension on February 27, 2019. Despite his offensive output, the Coyotes were eliminated from playoff contention on April 5. He finished the season with 13 goals and five assists through 47 NHL games.

During a game against the Calgary Flames, Garland suffered a lower-body injury when he collided with goaltender Cam Talbot. On March 8, 2020, it was announced that Garland would be week-to-week with a lower-body injury. At the time of the injury, he led the team in goals and was tied third for points with 39. He tallied 22 goals and 17 assists for 39 points through 68 regular season games and set single-season career highs in games, goals, assists, points, game-winning goals and shots. Six days following the injury, the NHL paused the season due to concerns surrounding the COVID-19 pandemic. Once they returned to play, Garland was healthy and rejoined the lineup. On June 9, Garland was the Coyotes' nominee for the Bill Masterton Memorial Trophy as a "player who best exemplifies the qualities of perseverance, sportsmanship, and dedication to hockey."

During practice, Garland suffered another lower-body injury and was listed as week-to-week. Upon returning from the injury, Garland tallied six points through three games to rank third on the team in scoring with 38 points. During the 2020–NHL season, the Coyotes played the St. Louis Blues eight times. During the series, he played with Schmaltz and Keller on the Coyotes' "Short Leash Line" which combined for 21 points. As the 2021 NHL expansion draft approached, Garland was one of seven forwards protected by the Coyotes.

=== Vancouver Canucks ===
On July 23, 2021, Garland's restricted free agent signing rights were traded, along with Oliver Ekman-Larsson, to the Vancouver Canucks in exchange for Jay Beagle, Loui Eriksson, Antoine Roussel, a 2021 first-round pick, a 2022 second-round pick, and a 2023 seventh-round pick. Prior to the start of the 2021–22 season, Garland signed a five-year, $24.75 million contract extension with the Canucks.

On July 1, 2025, on the first day he was eligible, Garland signed a six-year, $36 million contract extension with the Canucks.

=== Columbus Blue Jackets ===
On March 6, 2026, Garland was traded to the Columbus Blue Jackets, in exchange for a 2026 third-round pick and a 2028 second-round pick.

== International play ==
Medal record

Representing the United States

Ice hockey

World Championships
Bronze medal – third place	2021 Latvia	
Gold medal – first place	2025 Sweden/Denmark	

Garland represented the United States at the 2025 IIHF World Championship, where he recorded five goals and five assists in ten games and helped Team USA win their first gold medal since 1933.

== Personal life ==
Garland and his wife, Meghan, have one child, born in 2024.

== Career statistics ==
=== Regular season and playoffs ===
			Regular season					Playoffs
Season	Team	League	GP	G	A	Pts	PIM	GP	G	A	Pts	PIM
2011–12	Boston Jr. Bruins	EMJHL	40	42	52	94	53	5	3	6	9	14
2011–12	Boston Jr. Bruins	EJHL	2	0	0	0	2	—	—	—	—	—
2012–13	Muskegon Lumberjacks	USHL	6	1	2	3	2	—	—	—	—	—
2012–13	Moncton Wildcats	QMJHL	26	6	11	17	16	5	0	0	0	0
2013–14	Moncton Wildcats	QMJHL	51	24	30	54	39	6	2	3	5	2
2014–15	Moncton Wildcats	QMJHL	67	35	94	129	66	16	3	22	25	17
2015–16	Moncton Wildcats	QMJHL	62	39	89	128	97	17	5	10	15	18
2016–17	Tucson Roadrunners	AHL	55	5	9	14	37	—	—	—	—	—
2017–18	Tucson Roadrunners	AHL	55	8	19	27	40	9	1	4	5	6
2018–19	Tucson Roadrunners	AHL	21	12	13	25	22	—	—	—	—	—
2018–19	Arizona Coyotes	NHL	47	13	5	18	12	—	—	—	—	—
2019–20	Arizona Coyotes	NHL	68	22	17	39	20	8	1	1	2	0
2020–21	Arizona Coyotes	NHL	49	12	27	39	26	—	—	—	—	—
2021–22	Vancouver Canucks	NHL	77	19	33	52	36	—	—	—	—	—
2022–23	Vancouver Canucks	NHL	81	17	29	46	31	—	—	—	—	—
2023–24	Vancouver Canucks	NHL	82	20	27	47	35	13	3	2	5	2
2024–25	Vancouver Canucks	NHL	81	19	31	50	52	—	—	—	—	—
2025–26	Vancouver Canucks	NHL	50	7	19	26	30	—	—	—	—	—
2025–26	Columbus Blue Jackets	NHL	21	5	2	7	4	—	—	—	—	—
NHL totals			556	134	190	323	246	21	4	3	7	2

=== International ===
Year	Team	Event	Result	GP	G	A	Pts	PIM
2021	United States	WC	3rd place, bronze medalist(s)	10	6	7	13	6
2023	United States	WC	4th	10	2	6	8	0
2025	United States	WC	1st place, gold medalist(s)	10	5	5	10	14
Senior totals				30	13	18	31	20

== Awards and honors ==
Award	Year	Ref
QMJHL
Jean Béliveau Trophy	2014–15, 2015–16	
First All-Star team	2014–15, 2015–16	
Michel Brière Memorial Trophy	2014–15	
CHL Top Scorer Award (tied with Dylan Strome)	2014–15, 2015–16	
International
World Championship All-Star Team	2021	
