= Oliwer Kaski =

Finnish ice hockey player (born 1995)

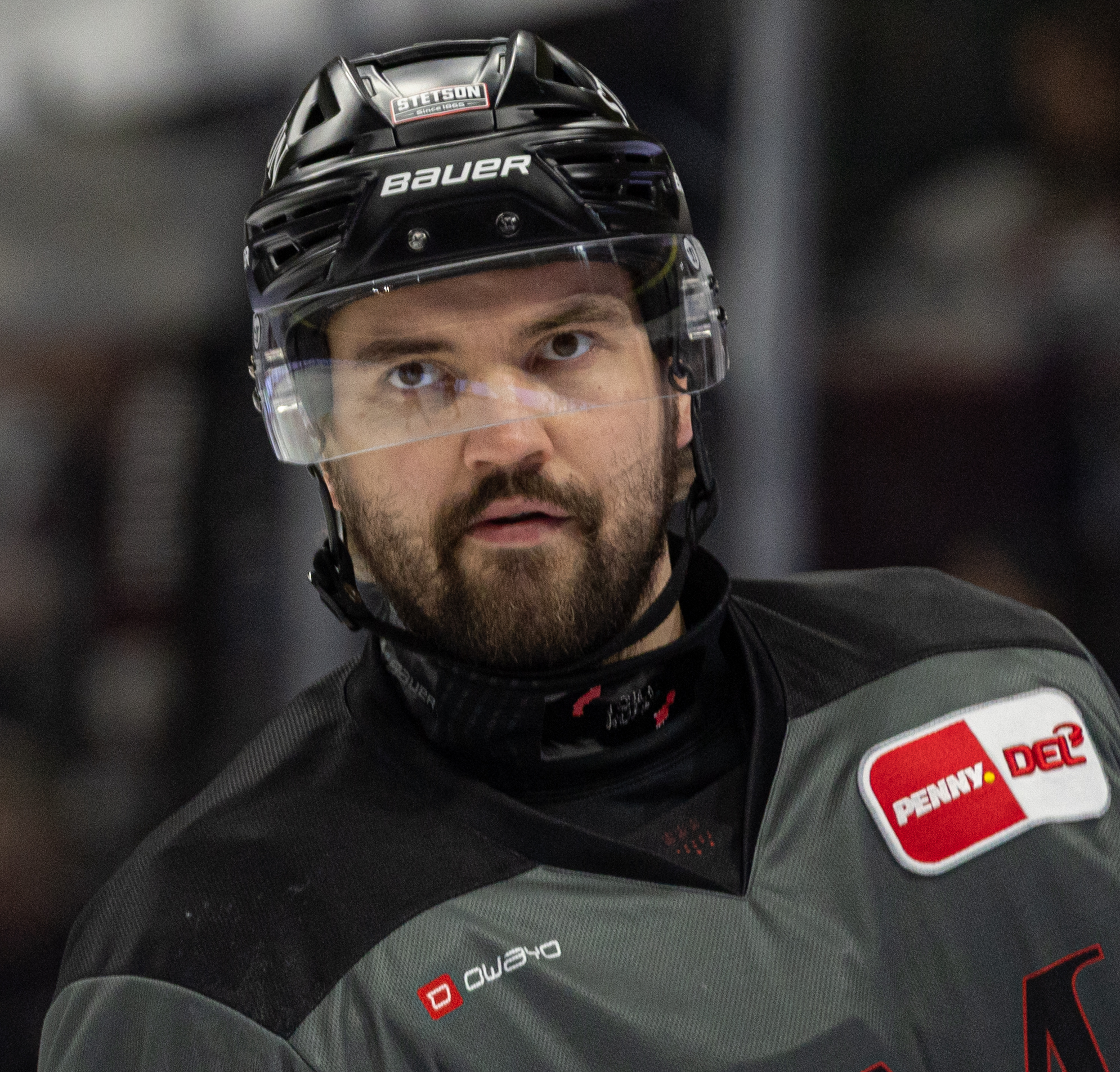
- Kaski in 2026
- Born: 4 September 1995 (age 30) Pori, Finland
- Height: 6 ft 3 in (191 cm)
- Weight: 187 lb (85 kg; 13 st 5 lb)
- Position: Defence
- Shoots: Right
- DEL team Former teams: Kölner Haie; HIFK; Lahti Pelicans; Grand Rapids Griffins; Charlotte Checkers; Avangard Omsk; HC Lugano; HV71
- National team: Finland
- NHL draft: Undrafted
- Playing career: 2016–present

Oliwer Kaski (born 4 September 1995) is a Finnish professional ice hockey defenceman who currently plays for Kölner Haie of the Deutsche Eishockey Liga (DEL). Before turning professional, Kaski became the first Finnish-born player to play for the Western Michigan Broncos. His father Olli was also a professional ice hockey player for fifteen years, eleven of them with the Liiga's Ässät. He has been part of the Detroit Red Wings and Carolina Hurricanes organizations.

== Playing career ==
Kaski played for Western Michigan University for two seasons, becoming the first player born in Finland to play for Western Michigan. In November 2016, his sophomore year at Western Michigan, Kaski signed with HIFK of the Finnish Elite League (Liiga). After playing parts of two seasons with HIFK, Kaski signed with the Lahti Pelicans in April 2018.

During the 2018–19 season, Kaski had a breakout year. He recorded 19 goals and 32 assists in 59 games, leading the Pelicans in scoring. Kaski was awarded the Lasse Oksanen trophy as the league's best player.

On 28 May 2019, Kaski signed as an undrafted free agent to a one-year, entry-level contract with the Detroit Red Wings.

After attending the Red Wings training camp, Kaski was assigned to begin the 2019–20 season with AHL affiliate, the Grand Rapids Griffins. In his first North American professional season, Kaski contributed with 2 goals and 5 points through 19 games before on 12 December 2019, Kaski was traded by the Red Wings to the Carolina Hurricanes in exchange for Kyle Wood. Kaski found his scoring touch with AHL affiliate, the Charlotte Checkers, registering 11 goals in just 35 games from the blueline.

As an impending restricted free agent with the Hurricanes, Kaski opted to leave North America in agreeing to a one-year contract with Russian club Avangard Omsk of the KHL on 18 June 2020.

In March 2022, Kaski left Avangard Omsk during playoffs due to the Russian invasion of Ukraine.

As a free agent, Kaski moved to Switzerland in the off-season, signing a two-year contract with Swiss club HC Lugano of the National League (NL) on 25 May 2022. In the 2022–23 season, Kaski struggled to adapt with Lugano, registering just 4 assists through 20 games. On 13 December 2022, Kaski opted to leave Switzerland to immediately join HV71 of the SHL on a two-year deal.

After an injury blighted third season with HV71 in 2024–25 resulting in shoulder surgery, Kaski left Sweden as a free agent and was signed to a one-year contract with German club, Kölner Haie of the DEL, on 10 June 2025.

== Career statistics ==
=== Regular season and playoffs ===
			Regular season					Playoffs
Season	Team	League	GP	G	A	Pts	PIM	GP	G	A	Pts	PIM
2013–14	Ässät	Jr. A	37	10	7	17	10	7	1	1	2	0
2014–15	Ässät	Jr. A	48	10	27	37	12	4	0	1	1	0
2015–16	Western Michigan University	NCHC	31	4	8	12	4	—	—	—	—	—
2016–17	Western Michigan University	NCHC	1	0	0	0	0	—	—	—	—	—
2016–17	HIFK	Liiga	36	2	4	6	0	12	1	1	2	0
2016–17	HIFK	Jr. A	3	3	2	5	2	—	—	—	—	—
2016–17	Kiekko-Vantaa	Mestis	3	0	1	1	2	—	—	—	—	—
2017–18	HIFK	Liiga	49	9	7	16	10	13	3	4	7	0
2018–19	Lahti Pelicans	Liiga	59	19	32	51	10	6	2	2	4	0
2019–20	Grand Rapids Griffins	AHL	19	2	3	5	12	—	—	—	—	—
2019–20	Charlotte Checkers	AHL	35	11	9	20	2	—	—	—	—	—
2020–21	Avangard Omsk	KHL	58	13	21	34	14	24	3	7	10	8
2021–22	Avangard Omsk	KHL	47	13	20	33	12	2	0	1	1	0
2022–23	HC Lugano	NL	20	0	4	4	2	—	—	—	—	—
2022–23	HV71	SHL	20	4	6	10	0	—	—	—	—	—
2023–24	HV71	SHL	39	8	12	20	4	—	—	—	—	—
2024–25	HV71	SHL	1	0	0	0	0	—	—	—	—	—
Liiga totals			144	30	43	73	20	31	6	7	13	0
KHL totals			105	26	41	67	26	26	3	8	11	8

Medal record

Representing Finland

Ice hockey

World Championships
Gold medal – first place	2019 Slovakia	
Silver medal – second place	2021 Latvia	

=== International ===
Year	Team	Event	Result	GP	G	A	Pts	PIM
2019	Finland	WC	1st place, gold medalist(s)	10	0	2	2	4
2021	Finland	WC	2nd place, silver medalist(s)	10	0	3	3	2
2024	Finland	WC	8th	8	0	5	5	0
Senior totals				28	0	10	10	6

== Awards and honours ==
Award	Year
Liiga
Juha Rantasila Trophy	2019
Lasse Oksanen Trophy	2019
KHL
Gagarin Cup (Avangard Omsk)	2021
