= Kim Nousiainen =

Finnish ice hockey player

- Born: 14 November 2000 (age 25) Kuopio, Finland
- Height: 5 ft 9 in (175 cm)
- Weight: 170 lb (77 kg; 12 st 2 lb)
- Position: Defence
- Shoots: Left
- Liiga team Former teams: KooKoo; KalPa; Lukko
- National team: Finland
- NHL draft: 119th overall, 2019; Los Angeles Kings
- Playing career: 2018–present

Kim Nousiainen (born 14 November 2000) is a Finnish professional ice hockey defenceman currently playing for the KooKoo of the Liiga. He was selected by the Los Angeles Kings in the fourth round, 119th overall, of the 2019 NHL entry draft.

== Playing career ==
Nousiainen played his first Liiga games with KalPa in the 2018–19 season, appearing in six regular-season contests. He was later selected 119th overall by the Los Angeles Kings in the 2019 NHL entry draft.

In his third full season with KalPa in 2021–22, Nousiainen was named an alternate captain and posted 4 goals and 14 points in 35 games. On 28 March 2022, Nousiainen left KalPa and moved to North America, joining the Kings organization in signing an amateur tryout contract with primary AHL affiliate, the Ontario Reign, for the remainder of the season. Nousiainen was then promptly signed to a three-year, entry-level contract with the Kings commencing in the 2022–23 season, on 31 March 2022.

After the 2023–24 season, having completed his third season with the Reign, Nousiainen opted to mutually terminate the remaining year of his contract with the Los Angeles Kings on 30 May 2024. In returning to his native Finland, Nousiainen was signed to a one-year contract to resume his career in the Liiga with Lukko on 3 June 2024.

On May 7, 2025, Nousiainen departed from Lukko and signed a two-year deal with another Liiga team, KooKoo.

== Career statistics ==
=== Regular season and playoffs ===
| | | | Regular season | | | | | Playoffs |
| Season | Team | League | GP | G | A | Pts | PIM | GP | G | A | Pts | PIM |
|---|---|---|---|---|---|---|---|---|---|---|---|---|
| 2016–17 | KalPa | Jr. A | 14 | 1 | 5 | 6 | 4 | 3 | 0 | 2 | 2 | 0 |
| 2017–18 | KalPa | Jr. A | 42 | 3 | 26 | 29 | 48 | 12 | 1 | 3 | 4 | 31 |
| 2018–19 | KalPa | Jr. A | 32 | 8 | 20 | 28 | 36 | 7 | 0 | 7 | 7 | 27 |
| 2018–19 | KalPa | Liiga | 6 | 0 | 0 | 0 | 4 | — | — | — | — | — |
| 2018–19 | IPK | Mestis | 8 | 0 | 5 | 5 | 4 | — | — | — | — | — |
| 2019–20 | KalPa | Liiga | 51 | 6 | 13 | 19 | 26 | — | — | — | — | — |
| 2020–21 | KalPa | Liiga | 54 | 9 | 18 | 27 | 14 | 4 | 0 | 0 | 0 | 0 |
| 2021–22 | KalPa | Liiga | 35 | 4 | 10 | 14 | 22 | — | — | — | — | — |
| 2021–22 | Ontario Reign | AHL | 8 | 0 | 2 | 2 | 4 | — | — | — | — | — |
| 2022–23 | Ontario Reign | AHL | 37 | 2 | 4 | 6 | 4 | — | — | — | — | — |
| 2023–24 | Ontario Reign | AHL | 52 | 0 | 9 | 9 | 26 | 8 | 0 | 2 | 2 | 0 |
| 2024–25 | Lukko | Liiga | 41 | 2 | 8 | 10 | 54 | 11 | 0 | 3 | 3 | 2 |
| Liiga totals | | | 187 | 21 | 49 | 70 | 120 | 15 | 0 | 3 | 3 | 2 |

Medal record

Representing Finland

Ice hockey

World Championships
| Silver medal – second place | 2021 Latvia | |

=== International ===
| Year | Team | Event | Result | GP | G | A | Pts | PIM |
|---|---|---|---|---|---|---|---|---|
| 2017 | Finland | IH18 | 6th | 4 | 0 | 1 | 1 | 2 |
| 2018 | Finland | U18 | 1st place, gold medalist(s) | 7 | 1 | 0 | 1 | 4 |
| 2020 | Finland | WJC | 4th | 7 | 1 | 3 | 4 | 4 |
| 2021 | Finland | WC | 2nd place, silver medalist(s) | 8 | 1 | 1 | 2 | 2 |
| Junior totals | | | | 18 | 2 | 4 | 6 | 10 |
| Senior totals | | | | 8 | 1 | 1 | 2 | 2 |
