= Andrew Mangiapane =

Canadian ice hockey player (born 1996)

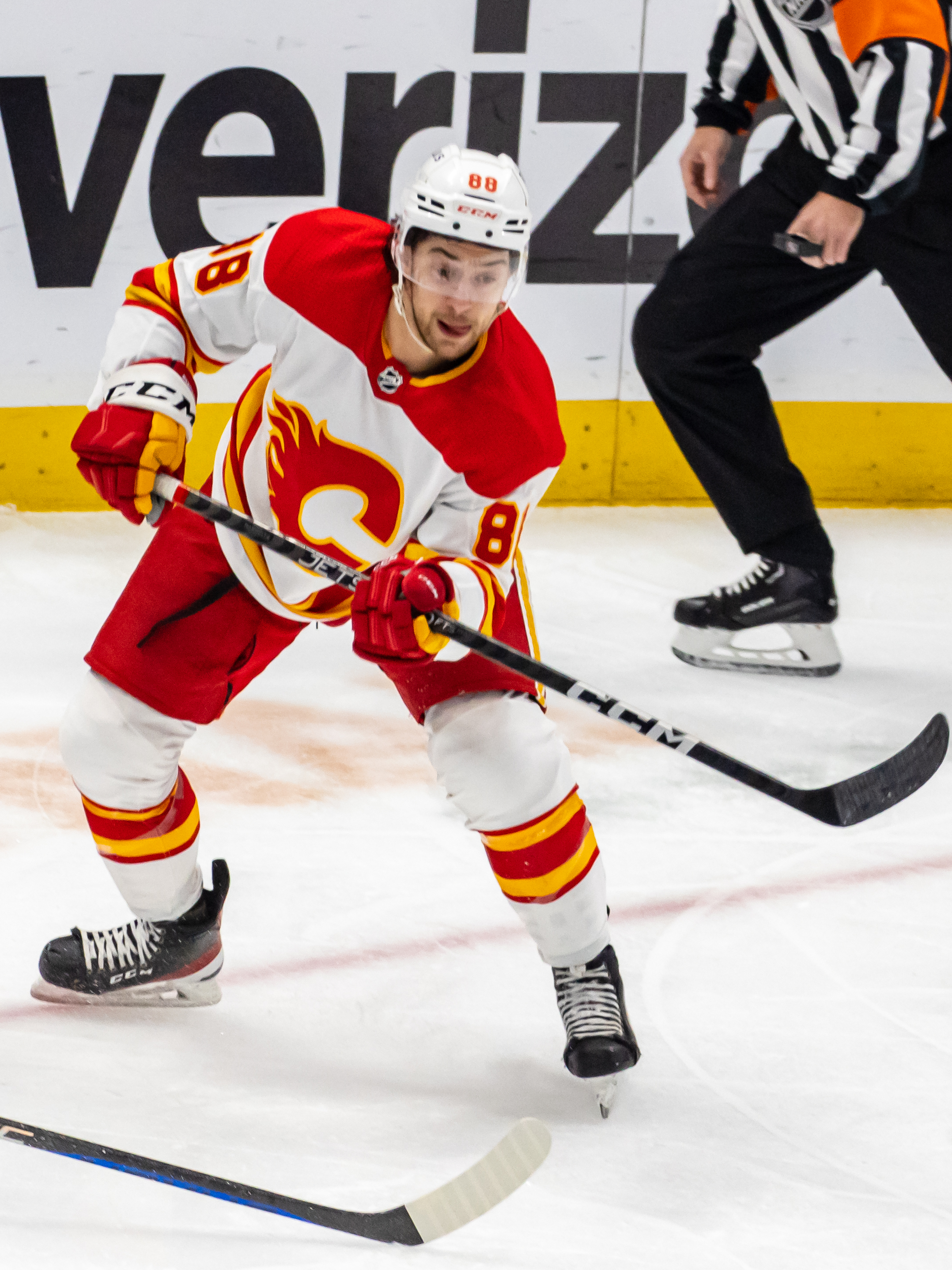
- Mangiapane with the Calgary Flames in 2023
- Born: April 4, 1996 (age 30) Bolton, Ontario, Canada
- Height: 5 ft 10 in (178 cm)
- Weight: 183 lb (83 kg; 13 st 1 lb)
- Position: Left wing
- Shoots: Left
- NHL team Former teams: Chicago Blackhawks; Calgary Flames; Washington Capitals; Edmonton Oilers
- National team: Canada
- NHL draft: 166th overall, 2015; Calgary Flames
- Playing career: 2016–present

Andrew Mangiapane (born April 4, 1996) is a Canadian professional ice hockey player who is a left winger for the Chicago Blackhawks of the National Hockey League (NHL). He was selected by the Calgary Flames in the sixth round, 166th overall, of the 2015 NHL entry draft.

== Playing career ==
=== Junior ===
Mangiapane went undrafted in the OHL Priority Draft after the 2012–13 Greater Toronto Hockey League season with Toronto Jr. Canadiens U-18 AAA where he scored 14 goals and 22 assists in 32 games and subsequently signed with the Barrie Colts as a free agent. In his first year with the Ontario Hockey League (OHL)'s Barrie Colts, Mangiapane's outstanding play was rewarded when he was named to the 2013–14 OHL First All-Rookie Team. Despite Mangiapane's success, he would go unranked by NHL Central Scouting Bureau and go undrafted in the 2014 NHL entry draft. During the 2014–15 season, Mangiapane reached 100 points, scoring 43 goals and 104 points in 68 games played. The following season, he was named an alternate captain for the Colts.

=== Calgary Flames ===
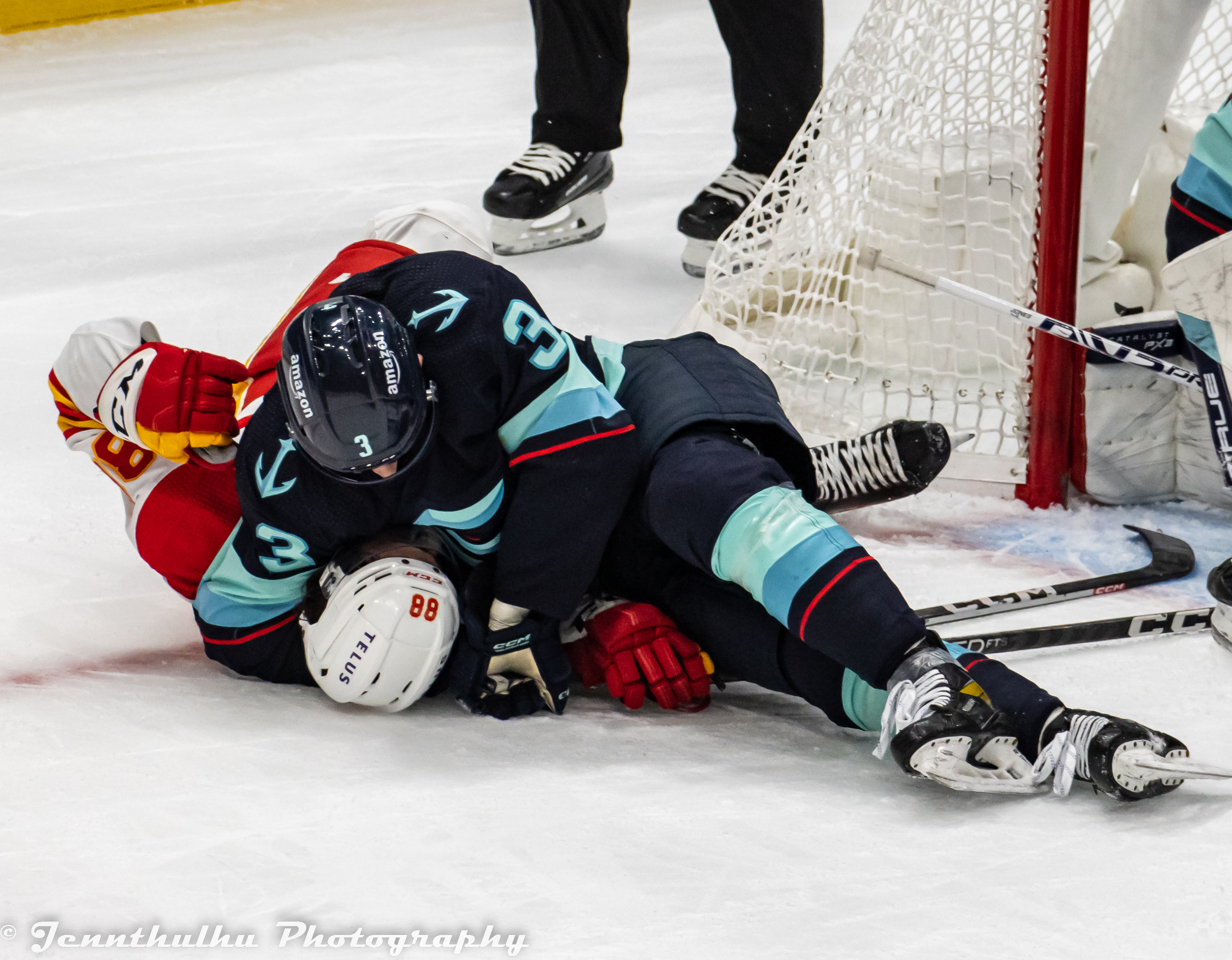
Andrew Mangiapane fighting with Will Borgen of the Seattle Kraken.

On March 23, 2016, Mangiapane was signed to an entry-level contract by the Calgary Flames, the organization which drafted him in the sixth round, 166th overall, in the 2015 NHL entry draft. Prior to the 2015 NHL Entry Draft, Mangiapane was listed as the 85th ranked North American skater by the NHL Central Scouting Bureau. Scouts described Mangiapane as an undersized, two-way forward with strong skating, speed, agility and puck protection.

After attending the Flames' training camp ahead of the 2017–18 season, Mangipane was reassigned to the club's American Hockey League (AHL) affiliate, the Stockton Heat, to begin the 2017–18 season. Recalled by the Flames, he made his NHL debut on December 31, 2017, in a game against the Chicago Blackhawks. He was reassigned to the Heat on January 15, 2018, after playing seven games with Calgary.

Mangiapane began the 2018–19 season in the AHL for Stockton. On November 30, 2018, he was called up by Calgary after recording 14 points in 13 games with the Heat. Although he was reassigned to the AHL on December 16, he was recalled a few days later after the Flames' Michael Frolík was placed on injured reserve. On January 13, 2019, Mangiapane earned his first NHL point in a 7–1 win over the Arizona Coyotes, assisting on captain Mark Giordano's first-period goal. Mangiapane re-signed with the Calgary Flames with a two-year $4.850 million contract on October 16, 2020, just four days before a scheduled arbitration hearing.

Mangiapane had a breakout season in 2021–22, scoring 35 goals for the Flames and nearly doubling his previous season high. Following the season, on August 2, 2022, Mangiapane signed a 3-year extension with an average annual value of $5.8 million. The contract included an eight-team no-trade list in the second and third year.

On November 4, 2023, Mangiapane was assessed a match penalty for attempt to injure following a cross check to the back of the neck of Seattle Kraken centre Jared McCann. McCann left the game bloodied, but eventually returned to play. One day later Mangiapane was suspended for one game.

Mangiapane played his 400th game on February 27, 2024, where he scored the opening goal of a 4–2 win over the Los Angeles Kings.

=== Washington Capitals ===
On June 27, 2024, Mangiapane was traded to the Washington Capitals in exchange for a second-round pick in 2025.

=== Edmonton Oilers ===
On July 1, 2025, Mangiapane was signed by the Edmonton Oilers as a free agent to a two-year, $7.2 million contract.

On March 1, 2026, Mangiapane was placed on waivers, alongside Alec Regula, but neither were claimed.

=== Chicago Blackhawks ===
On March 4, 2026, Mangiapane was traded to the Chicago Blackhawks along with a conditional first-round pick in the 2027 NHL entry draft in exchange for Jason Dickinson and Colton Dach. On March 9, 2026, Mangiapane scored his first goal as a Chicago Blackhawk in a win over Utah Mammoth.

== International play ==
Mangiapane was voted as the most valuable player by the media in the 2021 IIHF World Championship in Latvia. During the tournament, he scored seven goals and four assists in seven games to help propel Canada to its first World Championship title since 2016. Before Mangiapane arrived, Canada had lost all three of its round-robin games, but went 6–0–1 after Mangiapane joined the team.

Following the end of the 2023–24 NHL season, with the Flames not qualifying for the 2024 Stanley Cup playoffs, Mangiapane agreed to rejoin Team Canada for the 2024 IIHF World Championship.

== Personal life ==
Mangiapane is of Italian descent from his father, and Scottish from his mother. He was born in Bolton, Ontario, Canada.

Mangiapane served as a pallbearer at the funeral service of former Flames teammate Johnny Gaudreau.

== Career statistics ==
=== Regular season and playoffs ===
			Regular season					Playoffs
Season	Team	League	GP	G	A	Pts	PIM	GP	G	A	Pts	PIM
2012–13	Toronto Jr. Canadiens U18 AAA	GTHL	32	14	22	36	22	7	5	2	7	8
2012–13	Toronto Jr. Canadiens	OJHL	4	0	0	0	2	—	—	—	—	—
2013–14	Barrie Colts	OHL	68	24	27	51	28	11	2	5	7	8
2014–15	Barrie Colts	OHL	68	43	61	104	54	9	6	4	10	12
2015–16	Barrie Colts	OHL	59	51	55	106	50	15	10	11	21	14
2016–17	Stockton Heat	AHL	66	20	21	41	64	5	1	2	3	2
2017–18	Stockton Heat	AHL	39	21	25	46	20	—	—	—	—	—
2017–18	Calgary Flames	NHL	10	0	0	0	2	—	—	—	—	—
2018–19	Stockton Heat	AHL	15	9	8	17	20	—	—	—	—	—
2018–19	Calgary Flames	NHL	44	8	5	13	12	5	1	0	1	0
2019–20	Calgary Flames	NHL	68	17	15	32	18	10	2	3	5	6
2020–21	Calgary Flames	NHL	56	18	14	32	24	—	—	—	—	—
2021–22	Calgary Flames	NHL	82	35	20	55	38	12	3	3	6	10
2022–23	Calgary Flames	NHL	82	17	26	43	40	—	—	—	—	—
2023–24	Calgary Flames	NHL	75	14	26	40	47	—	—	—	—	—
2024–25	Washington Capitals	NHL	81	14	14	28	24	10	1	1	2	14
2025–26	Edmonton Oilers	NHL	52	7	7	14	36	—	—	—	—	—
2025–26	Bakersfield Condors	AHL	1	0	0	0	0	—	—	—	—	—
2025–26	Chicago Blackhawks	NHL	10	1	1	2	6	—	—	—	—	—
NHL totals			560	131	128	259	247	37	7	7	14	30

Medal record

Representing Canada

Ice hockey

World Championships
Gold medal – first place	2021 Latvia	

=== International ===
Year	Team	Event	Result	GP	G	A	Pts	PIM
2021	Canada	WC	1st place, gold medalist(s)	7	7	4	11	0
2024	Canada	WC	4th	10	1	6	7	2
Senior totals				17	8	10	18	2

== Awards and honours ==
Award	Year
OHL
First All-Rookie Team	2014
Second All-Star Team	2016
International
World Championship Most Valuable Player	2021
World Championship All-Star Team	2021
