= Ice hockey at the 2022 Winter Olympics – Men's qualification =

Qualification for the men's tournament at the 2022 Winter Olympics was determined by the IIHF World Ranking following the 2019 Men's Ice Hockey World Championships. The host along with the top eight teams in the world ranking received automatic berths into the Olympics, while all other teams have an opportunity to qualify for the remaining three spots in the Olympics.

== Qualified teams ==
Event	Date	Location	Vacancies	Qualified
Hosts	17 May 2018	(Denmark) Copenhagen	1	China
2019 IIHF World Ranking	31 March 2016 – 26 May 2019	(Slovakia) Bratislava and Košice	8	Canada; ROC; Finland; Sweden; Czech Republic; United States; Germany; Switzerland
Final qualification tournaments	26–29 August 2021	(Slovakia) Bratislava	1	Slovakia
Final qualification tournaments	26–29 August 2021	(Latvia) Riga	1	Latvia
Final qualification tournaments	26–29 August 2021	(Norway) Oslo	1	Denmark
Total			12	

Notes

1. ^{a} 2019 IIHF World Ranking were comprising the following events: 2016 World Championship, 2017 World Championship, 2018 Winter Olympic Games, 2018 World Championship and 2019 World Championship
2. ^{b} Bratislava and Košice were the sites for 2019 IIHF World Championship; at the conclusion of the tournament the ranking were finalized with regards to the qualification slots.

== Qualification seeding ==
To qualify directly, a nation had to be ranked in the top eight following the 2019 Men's World Ice Hockey Championships. Using the IIHF World Ranking points system, the current year received full value, and each preceding year was worth 25% less. The following is a ranking based on points that were accumulated toward Olympic qualification of all countries participating in 2019.

Points were earned based on overall finish in 2019:

Place	1	2	3	4	5	6	7	8	9	10	11	12	13	14	15	16	17	18	19	20	...
Points	1200	1160	1120	1100	1060	1040	1020	1000	960	940	920	900	880	860	840	820	800	780	760	740	...

Qualified directly to Olympic Tournament
Entered qualifying in the final round
Entered qualifying in the pre-qualification round 3
Entered qualifying in the pre-qualification round 2
Entered qualifying in the pre-qualification round 1

Qualifying seed	Team	WC 2019 (100%)	WC 2018 (75%)	OLY 2018 (75%)	WC 2017 (50%)	WC 2016 (25%)	Total
1	Canada	1160	1100	1120	1160	1200	3705
2	Russia	1120	1040	1200	1120	1120	3640
3	Finland	1200	1060	1040	1100	1160	3615
4	Sweden	1060	1200	1060	1200	1040	3615
5	Czech Republic	1100	1020	1100	1020	1060	3465
6	United States	1020	1120	1020	1060	1100	3430
7	Germany	1040	920	1160	1000	1020	3355
8	Switzerland	1000	1160	940	1040	920	3325
9	Slovakia	960	960	920	860	960	3040
10	Latvia	940	1000	860	940	880	3025
11	Norway	900	880	1000	920	940	3005
12	Denmark	920	940	800	900	1000	2925
13	France	840	900	840	960	860	2840
14	Belarus	780	840	880	880	900	2735
15	Austria	820	860	780	800	740	2635
16	Italy	860	780	760	820	780	2620
17	South Korea	760	820	900	780	720	2620
18	Slovenia	740	720	960	840	800	2620
19	Kazakhstan	800	760	820	760	820	2570
20	Great Britain	880	800	660	680	660	2480
21	Hungary	720	740	700	720	840	2370
22	Poland	660	700	740	740	760	2300
23	Japan	640	660	720	660	700	2180
24	Lithuania	700	680	560	640	640	2110
25	Ukraine	600	620	680	700	680	2095
26	Estonia	620	640	600	620	600	2010
27	Romania	680	600	580	560	580	1990
28	Netherlands	580	560	640	580	560	1910
29	Croatia	540	580	620	600	620	1895
30	Serbia	560	520	540	520	500	1740
31	Spain	500	440	520	460	540	1585
Host	China	480	500	440	440	460	1520
32	Iceland	420	460	480	480	480	1485
33	Israel	440	400	460	400	400	1385
	Australia	520	540	–	540	440	1305
34	Mexico	360	360	500	360	420	1290
	Belgium	460	480	–	500	520	1200
35	Bulgaria	320	300	420	300	340	1095
	Georgia	380	320	400	280	0	1060
	New Zealand	400	420	–	420	380	1020
	North Korea	340	380	–	380	360	905
36	Turkey	300	280	–	340	320	760
37	Luxembourg	260	340	–	320	280	745
	South Africa	220	240	–	240	300	595
38	Chinese Taipei	240	260	–	220	–	545
39	Hong Kong	180	220	–	260	240	535
	Turkmenistan	280	200	–	–	–	430
40	United Arab Emirates	200	160	–	200	–	420
41	Bosnia and Herzegovina	140	180	–	0	260	340
42	Kuwait	120	140	–	–	–	225
43	Thailand	160	–	–	–	–	160
44	Kyrgyzstan	100	–	–	–	–	100

- Teams with no seeding chose not to participate in Olympic qualifying.

== Pre-qualification Round 1 ==
Eight teams began the qualification process in two tournaments. The winners of each tournament advanced to round 2 as qualifiers ten and eleven, where qualifier ten was the winner with the higher qualification seeding.

=== Group N ===
Games were played in Kockelscheuer, Luxembourg from 8 to 10 November 2019.

Pos	Team	Pld	W	OTW	OTL	L	GF	GA	GD	Pts	Qualification
1	Kyrgyzstan	3	3	0	0	0	29	10	+19	9	Pre-qualification Round 2
2	United Arab Emirates	3	2	0	0	1	15	16	−1	6	
3	Luxembourg (H)	3	1	0	0	2	17	11	+6	3	
4	Bosnia and Herzegovina	3	0	0	0	3	7	31	−24	0	

Source: IIHF
Rules for classification: 1) points; 2) head-to-head points; 3) head-to-head goal difference; 4) head-to-head number of goals scored; 5) result against closest best-ranked team outside tied teams; 6) result against second-best ranked team outside tied teams; 7) seeding before tournament.
(H) Host

All times are local (UTC+1).

8 November 2019; 15:45	United Arab Emirates	4–9 (2–1, 2–3, 0–5)	Kyrgyzstan	Kockelscheuer Ice Rink, Kockelscheuer; Attendance: 200

Game reference

Khaled Al-Suwaidi
Ahmed Al-Dhaheri
Goalies
Aleksandr Petrov
Referee:
(Hong Kong) Li Ho Ching
Linesmen:
(Norway) Espen Olsvik
(Belgium) Chris Van Grinsven

	0–1	06:45 – Nosov (PP)
Al-Nuami (Al-Mehairi) – 07:13	1–1
Zainutdinov – 16:04	2–1
	2–2	22:04 – Titov (Kolodii, Kudashev) (PP)
Zainutdinov – 31:23	3–2
	3–3	31:56 – Titov (Gorobets, Kudashev)
	3–4	35:21 – Tonkikh (Nosov)
Zainutdinov (Al-Ameri) – 36:58	4–4
	4–5	46:56 – Gorobets (Egorov) (PP)
	4–6	48:41 – Tonkikh (Nosov, Chuvalov)
	4–7	52:02 – Nosov (Chuvalov, Titov)
	4–8	53:24 – Tagaev (Shushenkov)
	4–9	54:41 – Tonkikh (Chuvalov, Nosov)

34 min
Penalties
12 min
25
Shots
45

8 November 2019; 19:15	Bosnia and Herzegovina	1–10 (0–4, 0–5, 1–1)	Luxembourg	Kockelscheuer Ice Rink, Kockelscheuer; Attendance: 676

Game reference

Edis Pribišić
Goalies
Marcus Anselm
Referee:
(Republic of Ireland) Vytautas Lukoševičius
Linesmen:
(Belarus) Sidor Krytski
(Germany) Tobias Schwenk

	0–1	05:23 – Shelest (Houdremont, Grein) (PP2)
	0–2	06:17 – Farinon (Welter) (PP)
	0–3	13:39 – Welter (Houdremont)
	0–4	19:15 – Shelest (C. Cannon) (PP)
	0–5	31:56 – Eriksson (T. Beran, Bechtold)
	0–6	32:04 – Shelest (Eriksson, C. Cannon)
	0–7	34:49 – Grein (Backes) (SH)
	0–8	35:46 – C. Cannon (SH)
	0–9	38:19 – Grein (Eriksson) (PP)
	0–10	47:14 – Sinner (N. Mossong)
Filipović (Mrkva, Ćatović) – 49:37	1–10

12 min
Penalties
6 min
14
Shots
50

9 November 2019; 15:45	United Arab Emirates	6–3 (3–1, 2–1, 1–1)	Bosnia and Herzegovina	Kockelscheuer Ice Rink, Kockelscheuer; Attendance: 179

Game reference

Ahmed Al-Dhaheri
Goalies
Dino Pašović
Edis Pribišić
Referee:
(Republic of Ireland) Vytautas Lukoševičius
Linesmen:
(Norway) Espen Olsvik
(Germany) Tobias Schwenk

	0–1	05:11 – Hodžić (Mrkva, Ljevak) (PP)
Remess (Zainutdinov) – 08:35	1–1
Zainutdinov (J. Al-Dhaheri) – 09:58	2–1
Zainutdinov (Remess) (PP) – 14:00	3–1
J. Al-Dhaheri (Zainutdinov) – 24:05	4–1
Al-Mazrouei (Rem) (PP) – 24:49	5–1
	5–2	38:18 – Ćatović (PP)
J. Al-Dhaheri, (Savko) – 54:34	6–2
	6–3	55:48 – Filipović (PP)

22 min
Penalties
18 min
42
Shots
14

9 November 2019; 19:15	Luxembourg	3–5 (1–0, 0–4, 2–1)	Kyrgyzstan	Kockelscheuer Ice Rink, Kockelscheuer; Attendance: 734

Game reference

Philippe Lepage
Marcus Anselm
Goalies
Aleksandr Petrov
Referee:
(Turkey) Cemal Kaya
Linesmen:
(Belarus) Sidor Krytski
(Belgium) Chris Van Grinsven

Eriksson (Shelest) (PP) – 17:58	1–0
	1–1	25:17 – Nosov (Tonkikh, Chuvalov) (PP)
	1–2	28:07 – Kudashev (Gorobets)
	1–3	30:44 – Gorobets
	1–4	35:44 – Nosov (Kudashev) (SH)
Mosr (Backes) – 48:54	2–4
C. Cannon – 55:38	3–4
	3–5	59:26 – Tonkikh (SH, ENG)

6 min
Penalties
14 min
21
Shots
35

10 November 2019; 15:45	Kyrgyzstan	15–3 (5–2, 2–0, 8–1)	Bosnia and Herzegovina	Kockelscheuer Ice Rink, Kockelscheuer; Attendance: 232

Game reference

Kadyr Alymbekov
Goalies
Dino Pašović
Ismar Hadžić
Referee:
(Hong Kong) Li Ho Ching
Linesmen:
(Belarus) Sidor Krytski
(Norway) Espen Olsvik

Tonkikh (Nosov) – 01:29	1–0
Chuvalov (Egorov) – 01:48	2–0
	2–1	08:49 – Cordalija (Mrkva, Ćatović) (PP)
Nosov (Tonkikh) – 09:28	3–1
	3–2	10:09 – Hadžihasanović (Mušić, Ljevak)
Kolodii (Aiapov, Titov) – 11:58	4–2
Gorobets (Terentyev, Tursunbekov) (PP) – 15:20	5–2
Kolodii (Kudashev, Shushenkov) (PP) – 33:02	6–2
Kachkybekov (Titov) (PP) – 37:33	7–2
Tursunbekov (Gorobets, Nosov) – 40:49	8–2
Egorov (Chuvalov) – 42:02	9–2
Terentyev (Tonkikh, Nosov) – 46:22	10–2
Egorov (Chuvalov) – 47:06	11–2
	11–3	47:25 – Rakić (Hadžihasanović)
Titov – 52:07	12–3
Kolodii (Trishkin) – 52:14	13–3
Mirbekov (Ulugbek Uuly) – 54:36	14–3
Kudashev (Shushenkov) (PP) – 58:45	15–3

6 min
Penalties
14 min
49
Shots
12

10 November 2019; 19:15	Luxembourg	4–5 (2–2, 2–2, 0–1)	United Arab Emirates	Kockelscheuer Ice Rink, Kockelscheuer; Attendance: 403

Game reference

Philippe Lepage
Marcus Anselm
Goalies
Ahmed Al-Dhaheri
Referee:
(Turkey) Cemal Kaya
Linesmen:
(Germany) Tobias Schwenk
(Belgium) Chris Van Grinsven

	0–1	02:07 – Al-Zaabi (Remess, Al-Mazrouei)
	0–2	10:25 – J. Al-Dhareri (PP)
Backes (Welter) – 13:12	1–2
C. Cannon – 14:05	2–2
C. Cannon (Bechtold, Eriksson) (PP) – 23:33	3–2
	3–3	24:59 – Zainutdinov
Backes (Mosr) (PP) – 25:48	4–3
	4–4	31:42 – Savko (Al-Nuaimi, Al-Kaabi) (PP)
	4–5	49:29 – Remess

12 min
Penalties
22 min
24
Shots
32

=== Group O ===
Due to unrest in Hong Kong this tournament was moved to Sanya, China, and was played from 7 to 10 November 2019.

Pos	Team	Pld	W	OTW	OTL	L	GF	GA	GD	Pts	Qualification
1	Chinese Taipei	3	3	0	0	0	20	8	+12	9	Pre-qualification Round 2
2	Thailand	3	2	0	0	1	21	8	+13	6	
3	Hong Kong	3	1	0	0	2	19	14	+5	3	
4	Kuwait	3	0	0	0	3	1	31	−30	0	

Source: IIHF
Rules for classification: 1) points; 2) head-to-head points; 3) head-to-head goal difference; 4) head-to-head number of goals scored; 5) result against closest best-ranked team outside tied teams; 6) result against second-best ranked team outside tied teams; 7) seeding before tournament.

All times are local (UTC+8).

7 November 2019; 13:00	Chinese Taipei	5–3 (1–1, 0–0, 4–2)	Thailand	TUS Ice and Snow Park, Sanya; Attendance: 301

Game reference

Liao Yu-cheng
Goalies
Pattarapol Ungkulpattanasuk
Referee:
(Philippines) François Gautier
Linesmen:
(Hungary) Attila Nagy
(Hong Kong) Yeung Ting Kwan

	0–1	04:21 – Nagayama (Thanakroekkiat, Kindborn) (PP)
Yu Sh. (Yang, Yin) – 16:53	1–1
Yang (Lin H.) (SH) – 43:34	2–1
Hsiao Po-yua. (Lin H., Shen) (PP) – 47:20	3–1
	3–2	52:01 – Thanakroekkiat (Kindborn) (PP)
	3–3	55:24 – Forstner (Kindborn, Nagayama) (PP)
Yu Sh. (Chen, Yen) – 58:43	4–3
Yu Su. (ENG) – 59:27	5–3

10 min
Penalties
10 min
29
Shots
46

7 November 2019; 17:00	Kuwait	0–12 (0–4, 0–3, 0–5)	Hong Kong	TUS Ice and Snow Park, Sanya; Attendance: 250

Game reference

Jasem Al-Sarraf
Ahmad Al-Saegh
Goalies
Cheung Ching Ho
Referee:
(Malaysia) Mohamad Yusoff
Linesmen:
(United Arab Emirates) Omar Al-Yassi
(China) Tam Weng Leong

0–1	09:36 – Cheng (Yeung)
0–2	14:25 – R. Lee (Cheng) (PP)
0–3	18:04 – Y. Wong (Au-Yeung)
0–4	19:03 – Lui (L. Wong)
0–5	24:11 – R. Lee (Cheng)
0–6	38:00 – Cheng (Yeung)
0–7	39:26 – Kan (To, Au-Yeung)
0–8	46:48 – Cheng (Lui, L. Wong) (PP)
0–9	49:28 – Kan (Y. Wong)
0–10	50:36 – Chau (Law) (PP)
0–11	58:15 – Cheng (R. Lee) (PP)
0–12	59:44 – Wong K. (Au-Yeung, Kan) (PP2)

28 min
Penalties
8 min
13
Shots
54

8 November 2019; 13:00	Chinese Taipei	8–0 (0–0, 5–0, 3–0)	Kuwait	TUS Ice and Snow Park, Sanya; Attendance: 230

Game reference

He Wei-chih
Liao Yu-cheng
Goalies
Jasem Al-Sarraf
Referee:
(South Korea) Lee Joo-hyun
Linesmen:
(China) Tam Weng Leong
(Hong Kong) Yeung Ting Kwan

Lu (Yu Sh.) – 22:15	1–0
Hsiao Po-yua. (Shen, Hsiao Po-yun) (PP) – 28:43	2–0
Shen (Lin H.) (PP) – 30:25	3–0
Hsiao Po-yun (Chuang) (SH) – 32:49	4–0
Yu Sh. (Lu) (SH) – 34:16	5–0
Chang (Lu) – 46:15	6–0
Pao (Lin K.) – 52:34	7–0
Hsiao Po-yun (Yu Sh., Shen) – 57:32	8–0

29 min
Penalties
22 min
60
Shots
13

8 November 2019; 17:00	Hong Kong	2–7 (0–3, 1–1, 1–3)	Thailand	TUS Ice and Snow Park, Sanya; Attendance: 255

Game reference

Ho King Chi King
Goalies
Pattarapol Ungkulpattanasuk
Referee:
(Philippines) François Gautier
Linesmen:
(United Arab Emirates) Omar Al-Yassi
(Hungary) Attila Nagy

	0–1	07:20 – Luckanatinakorn
	0–2	09:46 – Tengsakul (Kitayama, Nagayama)
	0–3	16:01 – Thanakroekkiat (Kindborn, Forstner) (PP)
Cheng (Y. Wong) – 21:08	1–3
	1–4	26:30 – Luckanatinakorn (Forstner, Suwachirat)
Y. Wong (Au-Yeung, To) – 46:38	2–4
	2–5	52:50 – Rattanachot (Suwachirat, Kindborn)
	2–6	58:33 – Kitayama (Nagayama, Chartsuwan)
	2–7	59:20 – Suwachirat (Tengsakul, Khuhakaew)

8 min
Penalties
10 min
30
Shots
55

10 November 2019; 13:00	Thailand	11–1 (2–0, 4–0, 5–1)	Kuwait	TUS Ice and Snow Park, Sanya; Attendance: 318

Game reference

Prawes Kaewjeen
Supanat Rungruangwat
Goalies
Jasem Al-Sarraf
Ahmad Al-Saegh
Referee:
(Malaysia) Mohamad Yusoff
Linesmen:
(China) Tam Weng Leong
(Hong Kong) Yeung Ting Kwan

Kindborn – 02:41	1–0
Sukwiboon (Vattanapanyakul) – 03:27	2–0
Forstner (Nagayama, Sukwiboon) (PP) – 32:06	3–0
Forstner (Suwachirat, Kindborn) (PP2) – 33:38	4–0
Kindborn (Tengsakul, Vattanapanyakul) (PP) – 34:04	5–0
Kitayama (Nagayama) – 34:40	6–0
Chartsuwan (Nagayama, Sukwiboon) – 42:43	7–0
Kindborn – 44:59	8–0
Luckanatinakorn (Tengsakul) – 45:45	9–0
	9–1	47:44 – Al-Ajmi (A. Al-Sarraf) (PP)
Kitayama (Kindborn, Nagayama) (SH) – 57:13	10–1
Phasukkijwatana (Jaradwuttipreeda) – 59:39	11–1

4 min
Penalties
24 min
64
Shots
9

10 November 2019; 17:00	Hong Kong	5–7 (1–2, 2–2, 2–3)	Chinese Taipei	TUS Ice and Snow Park, Sanya; Attendance: 333

Game reference

Cheung Ching Ho
Goalies
Liao Yu-cheng
He Wei-chih
Referee:
(South Korea) Lee Joo-hyun
Linesmen:
(United Arab Emirates) Omar Al-Yassi
(Hungary) Attila Nagy

Chau (SH) – 01:31	1–0
	1–1	03:21 – Lin
	1–2	07:15 – Lin (Yang)
	1–3	23:26 – Shen (Hsiao Po-yua.) (SH)
	1–4	25:47 – Hsiao Po-yun (Tang)
Cheng – 27:15	2–4
Lau (A. Wong) – 28:32	3–4
Cheng (L. Wong, Lui) – 44:33	4–4
R. Lee (Au-Yeung) (PP) – 46:43	5–4
	5–5	50:04 – Yang (Hsiao Po-yua., Shen) (PP)
	5–6	52:21 – Hsiao Po-yun (Lin, Yang) (PP)
	5–7	59:02 – Lin (SH, ENG)

14 min
Penalties
12 min
22
Shots
50

== Pre-qualification Round 2 ==
Twelve countries played in three tournaments to determine qualifiers for the next round. Each tournament winner was ranked by their qualification seeding and entered the next round as qualifier seven, eight, or nine.

=== Group K ===
Pos	Team	Pld	W	OTW	OTL	L	GF	GA	GD	Pts	Qualification
1	Romania (H)	3	3	0	0	0	43	3	+40	9	Pre-qualification Round 3
2	Iceland	3	2	0	0	1	15	14	+1	6	
3	Israel	3	0	1	0	2	5	24	−19	2	
4	Kyrgyzstan	3	0	0	1	2	10	32	−22	1	

Source: IIHF
Rules for classification: 1) points; 2) head-to-head points; 3) head-to-head goal difference; 4) head-to-head number of goals scored; 5) result against closest best-ranked team outside tied teams; 6) result against second-best ranked team outside tied teams; 7) seeding before tournament.
(H) Host

All times are local (UTC+2).

12 December 2019; 15:00	Iceland	9–4 (2–0, 2–2, 5–2)	Kyrgyzstan	Brașov Olympic Ice Rink, Brașov; Attendance: 100

Game reference

Dennis Hedström
Goalies
Alexander Petrov
Kadyr Alymbekov
Referee:
(Poland) Tomasz Radzik
Linesmen:
(Romania) Attila André
(Mexico) Sem Ramírez

Björnsson (Árnason) – 01:20	1–0
Birgisson (G. Arason, Atlason) – 10:55	2–0
Leifsson (Mikaelsson, Sveinsson) – 21:31	3–0
	3–1	22:35 – Terentyev (Mirbekov)
Björnsson (Sigurðsson, Orongan) (PP) – 24:53	4–1
	4–2	26:30 – Tonkikh (Terentyev)
Sigrúnarson (Leifsson) – 48:26	5–2
Björnsson (Orongan) (PP) – 50:08	6–2
	6–3	50:57 – Nichipurenko (Kolodii)
Björnsson (Jóhannesson, Sigurðsson) (PP) – 54:29	7–3
Kristveigarson (Pálsson, Atlason) – 56:18	8–3
Sigrúnarson (Þorsteinsson, Leifsson) (PP) – 58:51	9–3
	9–4	59:41 – Nichipurenko (Tagaev)

18 min
Penalties
61 min
46
Shots
26

12 December 2019; 19:00	Israel	0–15 (0–1, 0–4, 0–10)	Romania	Brașov Olympic Ice Rink, Brașov; Attendance: 300

Game reference

Yehonatan Reisinger
Omer Sharir
Goalies
Zoltán Tőke
Referee:
(Netherlands) Ramon Sterkens
Linesmen:
(Spain) Alejandro García
(Netherlands) Nicholas Verbruggen

0–1	04:08 – Trancă (Borysenko, B. Péter) (PP)
0–2	21:43 – Butochnov (Salló) (PP)
0–3	22:41 – Gajdó (Győrfy, O. Bíró)
0–4	29:06 – Kirichenko (Góga, Borysenko)
0–5	39:40 – Salló (Fodor, Butochnov) (PP)
0–6	44:13 – Trancă (Borysenko, B. Péter) (PP)
0–7	47:36 – Cășăneanu (Gajdó, O. Bíró)
0–8	49:07 – Gliga (Góga, Molnár)
0–9	52:33 – O. Bíró (Gajdó)
0–10	54:33 – Farkas (Molnár, Gliga)
0–11	55:28 – Fodor (Butochnov, Kirichenko)
0–12	57:05 – Borysenko (Yemelianenko, Trancă)
0–13	57:56 – Borysenko (Trancă, G. Bíró)
0–14	59:03 – Butochnov (Salló, Fodor)
0–15	59:53 – Cășăneanu (Z. Péter)

24 min
Penalties
6 min
6
Shots
92

13 December 2019; 15:00	Iceland	5–0 (1–0, 2–0, 2–0)	Israel	Brașov Olympic Ice Rink, Brașov; Attendance: 50

Game reference

Jóhann Ragnarsson
Goalies
Yehonatan Reisinger
Referee:
(Netherlands) Ramon Sterkens
Linesmen:
(Romania) Attila André
(Spain) Alejandro García

Racansky (Þorsteinsson, Sveinsson) – 03:00	1–0
Leifsson (Sigrúnarson, Mikaelsson) (PP2) – 20:58	2–0
Orongan (Racansky, Sigurðsson) – 27:58	3–0
Orongan (Björnsson) – 47:34	4–0
Björnsson (Pálsson, Árnason) – 53:07	5–0

6 min
Penalties
14 min
64
Shots
9

13 December 2019; 19:00	Romania	18–2 (3–0, 7–1, 8–1)	Kyrgyzstan	Brașov Olympic Ice Rink, Brașov; Attendance: 601

Game reference

Patrik Polc
Goalies
Alexander Petrov
Kadyr Alymbekov
Referee:
(Norway) Jørn McCall
Linesmen:
(Mexico) Sem Ramírez
(Netherlands) Nicholas Verbruggen

Cășăneanu (Győrfy, Z. Péter) (SH) – 10:04	1–0
Borysenko (Trancă, B. Péter) (SH) – 16:47	2–0
Kirichenko (Butochnov, Fodor) – 18:58	3–0
B. Péter (Borysenko, Trancă) – 24:08	4–0
Constantin (Góga) – 24:22	5–0
Gajdó (O. Bíró) – 25:22	6–0
Trancă (B. Péter) – 27:02	7–0
Molnár – 31:23	8–0
Győrfy (O. Bíró, Z. Péter) (PP) – 32:51	9–0
Kirichenko (Fodor) – 34:01	10–0
	10–1	39:45 – Nichipurenko (Kolodii, Tagaev)
	10–2	42:58 – Titov
Gecse (Salló) – 47:09	11–2
Molnár (O. Bíró) – 49:27	12–2
Kirichenko (Butochnov, Salló) – 51:24	13–2
Gliga (Trancă, Góga) – 53:12	14–2
Constantin (Gliga, Molnár) – 53:41	15–2
Trancă (B. Péter) – 55:53	16–2
Fodor (Kirichenko) – 58:31	17–2
B. Péter (Trancă, Fodor) – 59:55	18–2

6 min
Penalties
10 min
69
Shots
32

15 December 2019; 15:00	Kyrgyzstan	4–5 OT (3–1, 1–1, 0–2) (OT: 0–1)	Israel	Brașov Olympic Ice Rink, Brașov; Attendance: 50

Game reference

Alexander Petrov
Goalies
Yehonatan Reisinger
Referee:
(Norway) Jørn McCall
Linesmen:
(Romania) Attila André
(Netherlands) Nicholas Verbruggen

	0–1	00:26 – Ben Tov (Aharonovich, Greenberg)
Nosov (Titov, Terentyev) – 07:48	1–1
Mirbekov (Kudashev, Gorobets) – 08:07	2–1
Nosov (Terentyev, Isamatov) (PP) – 19:32	3–1
	3–2	36:52 – Ibragimov (Hoffman, Vaitz) (PP)
Gorobets (Egorov) – 38:37	4–2
	4–3	56:09 – Sherf (Kaznatcheev)
	4–4	58:47 – Mostovoy
	4–5	63:30 – Vaitz

8 min
Penalties
10 min
44
Shots
32

15 December 2019; 19:00	Romania	10–1 (4–0, 4–0, 2–1)	Iceland	Brașov Olympic Ice Rink, Brașov; Attendance: 1,200

Game reference

Patrik Polc
Goalies
Dennis Hedström
Referee:
(Poland) Tomasz Radzik
Linesmen:
(Spain) Alejandro García
(Mexico) Sem Ramírez

Borysenko (Góga, G. Bíró) – 11:11	1–0
Butochnov (Fodor, Gecse) (PP) – 16:01	2–0
B. Péter (Borysenko, Góga) – 17:32	3–0
B. Péter (Gliga) – 19:37	4–0
Molnár (B. Péter, O. Bíró) – 22:55	5–0
Góga (Molnár, B. Péter) (PP) – 29:04	6–0
Molnár (B. Péter, Polc) (PP) – 31:18	7–0
Yemelianenko (G. Bíró, Constantin) (PP) – 37:33	8–0
Fodor (Gajdos, Casaneanu) – 45:53	9–0
Kirichenko (Fodor, Butochnov) – 51:16	10–0
	10–1	57:15 – Birgisson (Kristinsson, Atlason)

6 min
Penalties
18 min
54
Shots
22

=== Group L ===
Pos	Team	Pld	W	OTW	OTL	L	GF	GA	GD	Pts	Qualification
1	Netherlands	3	3	0	0	0	36	5	+31	9	Pre-qualification Round 3
2	Spain (H)	3	2	0	0	1	29	6	+23	6	
3	Chinese Taipei	3	1	0	0	2	8	26	−18	3	
4	Mexico	3	0	0	0	3	3	39	−36	0	

Source: IIHF
Rules for classification: 1) points; 2) head-to-head points; 3) head-to-head goal difference; 4) head-to-head number of goals scored; 5) result against closest best-ranked team outside tied teams; 6) result against second-best ranked team outside tied teams; 7) seeding before tournament.
(H) Host

All times are local (UTC+1).

13 December 2019; 16:00	Mexico	1–17 (1–6, 0–5, 0–6)	Netherlands	Palau de Gel, Barcelona; Attendance: 103

Game reference

Gerardo García
Paulo Rivera
Goalies
Ian Meierdres
Referee:
(Slovenia) Tilen Pahor
Linesmen:
(Romania) Csaba Bándi
(Spain) Carlos Trobajo

	0–1	00:46 – Bison (Van Oorschot)
	0–2	01:03 – Knoop (Smit, Van Gestel)
	0–3	04:03 – Verschuren (Smit, Loginov)
	0–4	05:41 – De Bonth (Van Gestel)
Sierra (Pérez, Ar. García) – 11:18	1–4
	1–5	19:07 – Verkiel (Van der Schuit)
	1–6	19:19 – Verschuren (Smit, Oosterveld)
	1–7	27:24 – Bison (Stempher) (PP)
	1–8	28:49 – Stempher (Verschuren, Van Oorschot) (PP)
	1–9	36:48 – Nordemann (Van Oorschot) (PP)
	1–10	38:24 – Turpijn (Oosterveld, Verschuren)
	1–11	38:36 – Van der Schuit (Knoop)
	1–12	47:00 – Stempher (De Bonth, Loginov) (PP)
	1–13	50:22 – Bison (Knoop)
	1–14	55:58 – Verschuren (Oosterveld)
	1–15	57:11 – Smit (De Bonth)
	1–16	58:40 – Verschuren (Oosterveld)
	1–17	59:04 – Borgman (Den Edel)

18 min
Penalties
18 min
7
Shots
88

13 December 2019; 20:00	Spain	11–0 (3–0, 4–0, 4–0)	Chinese Taipei	Palau de Gel, Barcelona; Attendance: 348

Game reference

Ander Alcaine
Raul Barbo
Goalies
Liao Yu-cheng
He Wei-chih
Referee:
(Hungary) Gergely Kincses
Linesmen:
(Norway) Knut Bråten
(Israel) Gil Tichon

Hernández (Baldris, Ubieto) – 02:41	1–0
Carbonell (Ubieto, Burgos) – 12:38	2–0
Fuentes (Hernández) – 13:51	3–0
Baldris (Fernández-Pola, Martínez) – 26:46	4–0
Burgos (Paul) – 27:47	5–0
Martínez (A. García) – 29:41	6–0
Ós. Rubio (Martínez) – 29:48	7–0
Boronat (Donath, Baldris) – 50:05	8–0
Donath (Fuentes, A. García) – 53:25	9–0
Or. Rubio – 55:33	10–0
Lasuen (Ubieto) – 56:41	11–0

2 min
Penalties
2 min
65
Shots
8

14 December 2019; 16:00	Netherlands	14–1 (4–1, 7–0, 3–0)	Chinese Taipei	Palau de Gel, Barcelona; Attendance: 433

Game reference

Martijn Oosterwijk
Goalies
He Wei-chih
Liao Yu-cheng
Referee:
(Slovenia) Tilen Pahor
Linesmen:
(Norway) Knut Bråten
(Spain) Carlos Trobajo

Verschuren (Van der Schuit, Loginov) (PP) – 01:54	1–0
	1–1	04:10 – Hsiao Po-yun (Shen)
Bison (Loginov) – 04:48	2–1
Verschuren (Turpijn) – 05:33	3–1
Van Gorp (De Bonth) – 05:40	4–1
Stempher (Bison) – 21:27	5–1
Verkiel (Oosterveld) – 22:04	6–1
Stempher (Bison) – 27:38	7–1
Oosterveld (Verschuren, Turpijn) – 29:23	8–1
Stempher (Verkiel) (SH) – 32:46	9–1
Verschuren (Van der Schuit) (SH) – 33:02	10–1
Oosterveld (Verschure, Turpijn) – 37:09	11–1
Stempher (Van der Schuit) – 40:54	12–1
Stempher (Verkiel) – 45:08	13–1
Van der Schuit (Stempher) – 53:32	14–1

8 min
Penalties
2 min
60
Shots
11

14 December 2019; 20:00	Spain	15–1 (4–1, 4–0, 7–0)	Mexico	Palau de Gel, Barcelona; Attendance: 612

Game reference

Raul Barbo
Ignacio García
Goalies
Gerardo García
Paulo Rivera
Referee:
(Norway) Stian Halm
Linesmen:
(Romania) Csaba Bándi
(Israel) Gil Tichon

Hernández (A. García, Burgos) (PP) – 14:33	1–0
	1–1	15:20 – Sierra (Ar. García, Pérez)
Lasuen – 17:19	2–1
Boronat (Baldris, Bravo) (PP) – 17:56	3–1
Hernández (Lasuen, García-Zarandieta) – 19:27	4–1
A. García (Carbonell) – 24:42	5–1
Martínez (Ós. Rubio) – 32:30	6–1
Donath (Fuentes, A. García) – 35:36	7–1
Or. Rubio (A. García, Donath) (PP) – 38:22	8–1
Granell (Boronat, A. García) – 41:20	9–1
Donath (Burgos) – 43:35	10–1
A. García (Ós. Rubio) – 55:34	11–1
Fuentes (Boronat) – 57:15	12–1
Ós. Rubio (Fernández-Pola) – 57:36	13–1
Hernández (Granell, Donath) – 59:02	14–1
Ós. Rubio (Martínez) – 59:38	15–1

37 min
Penalties
22 min
85
Shots
12

15 December 2019; 16:00	Chinese Taipei	7–1 (3–0, 3–0, 1–1)	Mexico	Palau de Gel, Barcelona; Attendance: 210

Game reference

Liao Yu-cheng
Goalies
Gerardo García
Referee:
(Norway) Stian Halm
Linesmen:
(Israel) Gil Tichon
(Spain) Carlos Trobajo

Pan (Sang, Lin H.) – 10:35	1–0
Lin H. (Hsiao Po-yun, Shen) (PP) – 14:00	2–0
Lin H. (Shen, Hsiao Po-yun) (PP) – 19:19	3–0
Hsiao Po-yun (Hsiao Po-yuan, Lin H.) (PP) – 27:31	4–0
Yang (Lin H.) – 30:13	5–0
Hsiao Po-yun (Chang) – 31:01	6–0
	6–1	47:08 – Sierra (Pérez)
Lin H. – 53:45	7–1

6 min
Penalties
16 min
34
Shots
23

8 January 2020^{[N 1]} 12:00	Netherlands	5–3 (1–1, 2–2, 2–0)	Spain	Palau de Gel, Barcelona; Attendance: 274

Game reference

Frederik Meierdres
Goalies
Ander Alcaine
Referee:
(Hungary) Gergely Kincses
Linesmen:
(Romania) Csaba Bándi
(Norway) Knut Bråten

Bison (Vogelaar, Stempher) – 03:12	1–0
	1–1	10:46 – Or. Rubio (Ubieto, González) (PP)
	1–2	23:09 – Fernández-Pola (Granell)
De Hondt (Bison, Stempher) – 23:26	2–2
De Bonth (Van der Schuit, Bastings) – 29:04	3–2
	3–3	34:13 – Or. Rubio (Granell, Giménez) (PP)
Van der Schuit (De Bonth) – 43:55	4–3
Stempher (De Hondt) (ENG) – 59:43	5–3

6 min
Penalties
2 min
37
Shots
17

The game was originally supposed to be played on 15 December 2019 but was stopped after a scoreless first period because of problems with the ice surface.

=== Group M ===
Pos	Team	Pld	W	OTW	OTL	L	GF	GA	GD	Pts	Qualification
1	Croatia (H)	3	3	0	0	0	24	4	+20	9	Pre-qualification Round 3
2	Serbia	3	2	0	0	1	16	5	+11	6	
3	Turkey	3	1	0	0	2	9	19	−10	3	
4	Bulgaria	3	0	0	0	3	2	23	−21	0	

Source: IIHF
Rules for classification: 1) points; 2) head-to-head points; 3) head-to-head goal difference; 4) head-to-head number of goals scored; 5) result against closest best-ranked team outside tied teams; 6) result against second-best ranked team outside tied teams; 7) seeding before tournament.
(H) Host

All times are local (UTC+1).

13 December 2019; 15:00	Serbia	8–3 (6–0, 1–3, 1–0)	Turkey	Ledena dvorana Zibel, Sisak; Attendance: 106

Game reference

Jug Mitić
Goalies
Tolga Bozacı
Referee:
(Slovenia) Miha Bajt
Linesmen:
(Bulgaria) Martin Boyadjiev
(Croatia) Marko Saković

Podunavac (Anić, Vučurević) – 00:28	1–0
Zwick (Popović, Dragović) – 01:47	2–0
Mitrović (Čengeri, Podunavac) – 02:14	3–0
Đumić – 13:14	4–0
Marković (Zwick) – 16:03	5–0
Vučurević (Pajić, Podunavac) – 17:32	6–0
	6–1	27:56 – Bakal (Aktürk, Halil)
Španjević (Mitrović) – 32:16	7–1
	7–2	34:32 – Solak (Gümüş)
	7–3	39:51 – Hars (E. Faner)
Đumić (Anić, Vučurević) (PP) – 51:22	8–3

10 min
Penalties
12 min
36
Shots
14

13 December 2019; 19:00	Bulgaria	1–12 (0–3, 0–2, 1–7)	Croatia	Ledena dvorana Zibel, Sisak; Attendance: 289

Game reference

Dimitar Dimitrov
Ivan Stoynov
Goalies
Vilim Rosandić
Referee:
(Poland) Krzysztof Kozłowski
Linesmen:
(Serbia) Tibor Fazekas
(Austria) Daniel Sparer

	0–1	03:16 – Kaleb (Vedlin)
	0–2	08:59 – Čizmadija (Šakić)
	0–3	18:15 – Kanaet (Šakić) (SH)
	0–4	36:48 – Mirić (F. Jarčov, Kegalj)
	0–5	37:14 – Puzić (Kanaet, Paulović)
	0–6	41:42 – Kanaet (Mirić) (SH)
	0–7	47:07 – Fičur
	0–8	47:39 – L. Jarčov (Šakić, Tadić) (PP2)
	0–9	50:52 – Mikulić (SH)
	0–10	53:19 – L. Jarčov (Šakić) (PP)
	0–11	55:22 – Kaleb (Brenčun, Mikulić) (PP)
	0–12	58:03 – L. Jarčov
Gatsev (Nakov) – 59:08	1–12

34 min
Penalties
12 min
14
Shots
62

14 December 2019; 15:00	Serbia	7–0 (1–0, 4–0, 2–0)	Bulgaria	Ledena dvorana Zibel, Sisak; Attendance: 80

Game reference

Arsenije Ranković
Goalies
Dimitar Dimitrov
Ivan Stoynov
Referee:
(Slovakia) Vladimír Snášel
Linesmen:
(Croatia) Marko Saković
(Austria) Daniel Sparer

Grković (Čengeri, Podunavac) – 09:28	1–0
Popović (Leštarić) (PP) – 22:04	2–0
Bjelogrlić (Radosavljević, Anić) – 26:54	3–0
Anić (Novaković, Leštarić) – 33:53	4–0
Bjelogrlić (PP) – 35:04	5–0
Bjelogrlić (Pajić) – 46:23	6–0
Bjelogrlić (Podunavac) – 51:09	7–0

18 min
Penalties
18 min
54
Shots
7

14 December 2019; 19:00	Croatia	10–2 (2–1, 4–0, 4–1)	Turkey	Ledena dvorana Zibel, Sisak; Attendance: 380

Game reference

Ivan Štimac-Rojtinić
Goalies
Tolga Bozacı
Onurcan Kaya
Referee:
(Poland) Krzysztof Kozłowski
Linesmen:
(Bulgaria) Martin Boyadjiev
(Serbia) Tibor Fazekas

Čizmadija (Brenčun) – 05:55	1–0
Čunko (Šakić, Tadić) (PP) – 12:33	2–0
	2–1	19:09 – Gümüş (Halil) (PP)
Mikulić (Čizmadija, Kaleb) – 21:27	3–1
Puzić (Čunko, Šakić) – 25:05	4–1
Mirić (Fičur) – 26:30	5–1
Kramarič (Paulović, Čanić) – 38:14	6–1
Vedlin (Kegalj) (PP) – 41:37	7–1
	7–2	44:34 – Bakal (Savaş)
Šakić (Tadić) – 51:42	8–2
Srketić (L. Jarčov, Čunko) (PP) – 56:38	9–2
Ličina (Paulović) – 58:58	10–2

18 min
Penalties
22 min
38
Shots
8

15 December 2019; 15:00	Turkey	4–1 (1–0, 3–1, 0–0)	Bulgaria	Ledena dvorana Zibel, Sisak; Attendance: 50

Game reference

Tolga Bozacı
Goalies
Dimitar Dimitrov
Referee:
(Slovenia) Miha Bajt
Linesmen:
(Serbia) Tibor Fazekas
(Croatia) Marko Saković

Karş (Hars, F. Faner) – 19:09	1–0
Anlar (H. Salt, E. Faner) (PP) – 25:25	2–0
Anlar (K. Salt) – 35:29	3–0
	3–1	35:58 – T. Abdi (V. Dikov)
Solak (H. Salt) (PP) – 37:53	4–1

12 min
Penalties
102 min
45
Shots
19

15 December 2019; 19:00	Croatia	2–1 (1–0, 0–1, 1–0)	Serbia	Ledena dvorana Zibel, Sisak; Attendance: 989

Game reference

Vilim Rosandić
Goalies
Arsenije Ranković
Referee:
(Slovakia) Vladimír Snášel
Linesmen:
(Bulgaria) Martin Boyadjiev
(Austria) Daniel Sparer

Mirić (Kaleb) – 06:09	1–0
	1–1	39:12 – Đumić (Anić)
Mikulić (Čanić) – 57:35	2–1

26 min
Penalties
28 min
31
Shots
29

== Pre-qualification Round 3 ==
=== Group G ===
Pos	Team	Pld	W	OTW	OTL	L	GF	GA	GD	Pts	Qualification
1	Slovenia (H)	3	3	0	0	0	25	4	+21	9	Final qualification
2	Japan	3	2	0	0	1	15	6	+9	6	
3	Lithuania	3	1	0	0	2	5	17	−12	3	
4	Croatia	3	0	0	0	3	1	19	−18	0	

Source: IIHF
Rules for classification: 1) points; 2) head-to-head points; 3) head-to-head goal difference; 4) head-to-head number of goals scored; 5) result against closest best-ranked team outside tied teams; 6) result against second-best ranked team outside tied teams; 7) seeding before tournament.
(H) Host

All times are local (UTC+1).

6 February 2020; 15:30	Japan	9–0 (4–0, 2–0, 3–0)	Croatia	Podmežakla Hall, Jesenice; Attendance: 100

Game reference

Yutaka Fukufuji
Yuta Narisawa
Goalies
Ivan Štimac-Rojtinić
Referees:
(Latvia) Andris Ansons
(Germany) Lasse Kopitz
Linesmen:
(France) Nicolas Constantineau
(Slovenia) Matjaž Hribar

Echigo (Nakajima, Osawa) (PP) – 05:53	1–0
Yamada (Kawai, Terao) – 06:42	2–0
Takagi (Ueno, Osawa) – 09:54	3–0
Osawa (Echigo, Nakajima) (PP) – 15:07	4–0
Irikura (Ikeda) – 20:46	5–0
Hirano (Nakajima, Echigo) – 29:42	6–0
Sato (Furuhashi, Ikeda) (PP) – 44:40	7–0
Hashimoto (Nakajima, Hirano) – 48:56	8–0
Hirano (Nakajima, Y. Otsu) – 56:36	9–0

6 min
Penalties
6 min
56
Shots
15

6 February 2020; 19:00	Lithuania	2–12 (0–4, 1–3, 1–5)	Slovenia	Podmežakla Hall, Jesenice; Attendance: 500

Game reference

Laurynas Lubys
Artur Pavliukov
Goalies
Gašper Krošelj
Referees:
(Switzerland) Joris Müller
(Croatia) Trpimir Piragić
Linesmen:
(Norway) Håvar Dahl
(Kazakhstan) Mihail Stupak

	0–1	02:32 – Koblar (Pretnar)
	0–2	04:01 – Zajc (Ograjenšek, Čepon)
	0–3	10:53 – Koblar (Čimžar, Pretnar)
	0–4	12:46 – Urbas (Kuralt) (PP)
	0–5	21:05 – Ograjenšek (Urbas, Gregorc) (PP)
	0–6	29:31 – Jeglič (Čimžar, Repe)
	0–7	36:14 – Verlič (Kuralt)
Verenis (Bosas) (PP) – 39:53	1–7
	1–8	43:31 – Gregorc (Kalan)
	1–9	46:02 – Sabolič (Jeglič, Tičar)
	1–10	47:52 – Verlič (Urbas, Čepon)
	1–11	52:19 – Jeglič (Tičar, Sabolič)
	1–12	53:47 – Koblar (Kalan, Pavlin)
Krakauskas (Žukauskas, Misiuk) – 59:59	2–12

10 min
Penalties
8 min
9
Shots
61

7 February 2020; 15:30	Japan	4–0 (4–0, 0–0, 0–0)	Lithuania	Podmežakla Hall, Jesenice; Attendance: 150

Game reference

Yuta Narisawa
Goalies
Laurynas Lubys
Referees:
(France) Geoffrey Barcelo
(Croatia) Trpimir Piragić
Linesmen:
(Switzerland) Dominik Altmann
(Slovenia) Matjaž Hribar

Terao (Takahashi, Yanadori) – 02:04	1–0
Echigo (Hirano, Hashimoto) (PP2) – 05:37	2–0
Sato (Furuhashi, Takagi) (PP) – 14:04	3–0
Takahashi (Terao) – 17:16	4–0

26 min
Penalties
10 min
27
Shots
24

7 February 2020; 19:00	Slovenia	7–0 (1–0, 4–0, 2–0)	Croatia	Podmežakla Hall, Jesenice; Attendance: 900

Game reference

Matija Pintarič
Goalies
Vito Nikolić
Referees:
(Germany) Lasse Kopitz
(Switzerland) Joris Müller
Linesmen:
(France) Nicolas Constantineau
(Kazakhstan) Mihail Stupak

Tičar (Sabolič) – 16:15	1–0
Urbas (Gregorc, Ograjenšek) (PP) – 23:40	2–0
Tičar (Pretnar, Sabolič) (PP) – 32:06	3–0
Kuralt (Gregorc, Urbas) (PP) – 37:54	4–0
Zajc (Logar, Čepon) – 38:28	5–0
Verlič (Koren) – 51:22	6–0
Kalan (Pretnar, Čepon) – 59:54	7–0

6 min
Penalties
12 min
67
Shots
4

9 February 2020; 15:30	Croatia	1–3 (0–2, 0–0, 1–1)	Lithuania	Podmežakla Hall, Jesenice; Attendance: 150

Game reference

Vito Nikolić
Goalies
Laurynas Lubys
Referees:
(France) Geoffrey Barcelo
(Switzerland) Joris Müller
Linesmen:
(Switzerland) Dominik Altmann
(Kazakhstan) Mihail Stupak

	0–1	05:54 – Bosas (Verenis, Bendžius) (PP)
	0–2	14:48 – Čižas (Bosas)
Tadić (Šakić, Čanić) – 52:27	1–2
	1–3	59:57 – Rumševičius (EN)

12 min
Penalties
6 min
22
Shots
33

9 February 2020; 19:00	Slovenia	6–2 (0–1, 1–0, 5–1)	Japan	Podmežakla Hall, Jesenice; Attendance: 1,700

Game reference

Gašper Krošelj
Goalies
Yutaka Fukufuji
Referees:
(Latvia) Andris Ansons
(Germany) Lasse Kopitz
Linesmen:
(France) Nicolas Constantineau
(Norway) Håvar Dahl

	0–1	08:02 – Nakajima (Hashimoto, Hirano)
Urbas (Ograjenšek) (PP) – 25:43	1–1
Ograjenšek (Gregorc, Verlič) (PP) – 45:19	2–1
Sabolič (Repe) – 46:47	3–1
Tičar (Sabolič) (EN) – 57:23	4–1
	4–2	58:30 – Nakajima (PP, EA)
Tičar (Jeglič) (EN) – 58:57	5–2
Zajc (Čepon) – 59:26	6–2

20 min
Penalties
10 min
38
Shots
13

=== Group H ===
Pos	Team	Pld	W	OTW	OTL	L	GF	GA	GD	Pts	Qualification
1	Poland	3	3	0	0	0	17	3	+14	9	Final qualification
2	Kazakhstan (H)	3	2	0	0	1	17	5	+12	6	
3	Ukraine	3	1	0	0	2	5	14	−9	3	
4	Netherlands	3	0	0	0	3	1	18	−17	0	

Source: IIHF
Rules for classification: 1) points; 2) head-to-head points; 3) head-to-head goal difference; 4) head-to-head number of goals scored; 5) result against closest best-ranked team outside tied teams; 6) result against second-best ranked team outside tied teams; 7) seeding before tournament.
(H) Host

All times are local (UTC+6).

6 February 2020; 15:00	Poland	8–0 (3–0, 4–0, 1–0)	Netherlands	Barys Arena, Nur-Sultan; Attendance: 228

Game reference

John Murray
Michał Kieler
Goalies
Ian Meierdres
Martijn Oosterwijk
Referees:
(United Kingdom) Pavel Halas Jr.
(Belarus) Miroslav Iarets
Linesmen:
(Bulgaria) Martin Boyajiev
(United Kingdom) Andrew Dalton

Kostek (Kapica) (PP) – 02:58	1–0
Chmielewski (Kolusz, Paś) (PP) – 07:58	2–0
Urbanowicz (Chmielewski) (PP) – 13:09	3–0
Paś (Dziubiński, Kolusz) (PP) – 24:11	4–0
Wajda (Urbanowicz, Chmielewski) – 26:23	5–0
Jaśkiewicz (Przygodzki, Michałowski) – 26:55	6–0
Jaśkiewicz – 35:55	7–0
Komorski (Kostek) – 49:11	8–0

6 min
Penalties
14 min
51
Shots
6

6 February 2020; 19:30	Ukraine	1–8 (1–5, 0–2, 0–1)	Kazakhstan	Barys Arena, Nur-Sultan; Attendance: 3,584

Game reference

Kyrylo Kucher
Mykyta Hordiushin
Goalies
Henrik Karlsson
Referees:
(Hungary) Miklós Haszonits
(Czech Republic) Adam Kika
Linesmen:
(Poland) Paweł Kosidło
(Hungary) Dániel Soós

	0–1	03:43 – Shevchenko (Maklyukov, Akolzin)
	0–2	07:35 – Petukhov (Orekhov)
	0–3	08:27 – Metalnikov (Dietz, Shestakov)
	0–4	12:58 – Starchenko (Valk, Mikhailis)
Babinets (Butsenko, Blagoy) – 14:56	1–4
	1–5	17:39 – Zhailauov (Dietz)
	1–6	32:56 – Dietz (Shestakov)
	1–7	34:40 – Shestakov (Dietz)
	1–8	51:06 – Orekhov (Zhailauov)

4 min
Penalties
2 min
13
Shots
60

7 February 2020; 15:00	Poland	6–1 (1–1, 2–0, 3–0)	Ukraine	Barys Arena, Nur-Sultan; Attendance: 242

Game reference

John Murray
Goalies
Kyrylo Kucher
Mykyta Hordiushin
Referees:
(Czech Republic) Adam Kika
(Germany) Gordon Schukies
Linesmen:
(United Kingdom) Andrew Dalton
(Sweden) Andreas Malmqvist

	0–1	15:45 – Taran (Alexyuk, Butsenko)
Starzyński (Dziubiński) – 19:34	1–1
Przygodzki (Wajda, Marzec) – 27:19	2–1
Marzec (SH) – 35:55	3–1
Kolusz (PP) – 40:44	4–1
Kapica (Ciura, Bettahar) – 52:16	5–1
Komorski – 55:11	6–1

14 min
Penalties
12 min
40
Shots
18

7 February 2020; 19:30	Kazakhstan	7–1 (3–0, 1–1, 3–0)	Netherlands	Barys Arena, Nur-Sultan; Attendance: 2,975

Game reference

Sergei Kudryavtsev
Goalies
Martijn Oosterwijk
Referees:
(United Kingdom) Pavel Halas Jr.
(Hungary) Miklós Haszonits
Linesmen:
(Bulgaria) Martin Boyajiev
(Poland) Paweł Kosidło

Blacker (Shalapov, Shestakov) – 01:01	1–0
Dietz (Rymarev, Starchenko) – 08:26	2–0
Rymarev (Boyd) – 10:33	3–0
Orekhov (Zhailauov, Petukhov) – 22:59	4–0
	4–1	27:22 – Van der Schuit (Stempher)
Sagadeyev (Petukhov) – 41:57	5–1
Zhailauov (Sagadeyev, Shalapov) – 52:16	6–1
Zhailauov (Petukhov, Sagadeyev) (PP) – 57:56	7–1

4 min
Penalties
6 min
57
Shots
10

9 February 2020; 13:00	Netherlands	0–3 (0–1, 0–2, 0–0)	Ukraine	Barys Arena, Nur-Sultan; Attendance: 372

Game reference

Ian Meierdres
Goalies
Artur Ohandzhanyan
Referees:
(United Kingdom) Pavel Halas Jr.
(Belarus) Miroslav Iarets
Linesmen:
(Poland) Paweł Kosidło
(Hungary) Dániel Soós

0–1	15:10 – Nimenko (Butsenko, Babinets)
0–2	22:12 – Butsenko (Babinets, Nimenko)
0–3	30:29 – Savchenko (Mikhnov, Tolstushko) (PP)

10 min
Penalties
14 min
19
Shots
31

9 February 2020; 17:00	Kazakhstan	2–3 (0–1, 2–1, 0–1)	Poland	Barys Arena, Nur-Sultan; Attendance: 5,622

Game reference

Henrik Karlsson
Goalies
John Murray
Referees:
(Czech Republic) Adam Kika
(Germany) Gordon Schukies
Linesmen:
(United Kingdom) Andrew Dalton
(Sweden) Andreas Malmqvist

	0–1	07:28 – Ciura
	0–2	30:30 – Przygodzki (Jaśkiewicz)
Boyd (Valk, Dawes) – 30:47	1–2
Boyd (Dawes, Valk) – 35:29	2–2
	2–3	40:29 – Urbanowicz (Komorski, Dziubiński)

2 min
Penalties
6 min
53
Shots
17

=== Group J ===
Pos	Team	Pld	W	OTW	OTL	L	GF	GA	GD	Pts	Qualification
1	Hungary	3	2	1	0	0	11	4	+7	8	Final qualification
2	Great Britain (H)	3	2	0	0	1	12	8	+4	6	
3	Romania	3	1	0	1	1	12	10	+2	4	
4	Estonia	3	0	0	0	3	5	18	−13	0	

Source: IIHF
Rules for classification: 1) points; 2) head-to-head points; 3) head-to-head goal difference; 4) head-to-head number of goals scored; 5) result against closest best-ranked team outside tied teams; 6) result against second-best ranked team outside tied teams; 7) seeding before tournament.
(H) Host

All times are local (UTC±0).

6 February 2020; 15:30	Hungary	4–1 (1–0, 2–1, 1–0)	Estonia	Motorpoint Arena Nottingham, Nottingham; Attendance: 861

Game reference

Miklós Rajna
Goalies
Villem-Henrik Koitmaa
Referees:
(Switzerland) Alex DiPietro
(Austria) Ladislav Smetana
Linesmen:
(United Kingdom) Daniel Beresford
(Kazakhstan) Vladimir Suslov

Hári (Galanisz, Terbócs) – 09:21	1–0
Hári (Nagy, Terbócs) (PP) – 26:20	2–0
	2–1	29:29 – Lodeikin
Hári (Stipsicz, Szabó) – 31:11	3–1
Csányi (Kiss) – 56:10	4–1

2 min
Penalties
8 min
36
Shots
20

6 February 2020; 19:30	Great Britain	4–3 (2–1, 2–1, 0–1)	Romania	Motorpoint Arena Nottingham, Nottingham; Attendance: 2,788

Game reference

Ben Bowns
Goalies
Patrik Polc
Referees:
(Canada) Jonathan Alarie
(Kazakhstan) Vladimir Yefremov
Linesmen:
(Finland) Joona Elonen
(Belgium) Frederic Monnaie

	0–1	14:21 – Kirichenko
D. Ehrhardt – 15:11	1–1
Farmer (D. Ehrhardt, T. Ehrhardt) – 17:16	2–1
	2–2	29:46 – Tranca (B. Péter)
Myers – 32:20	3–2
Connolly (Lake) – 32:50	4–2
	4–3	56:41 – Salló

10 min
Penalties
4 min
34
Shots
23

8 February 2020; 14:00	Hungary	3–2 OT (1–1, 0–0, 1–1) (OT: 1–0)	Romania	Motorpoint Arena Nottingham, Nottingham; Attendance: 1,998

Game reference

Gergely Arany
Goalies
Patrik Polc
Referees:
(Switzerland) Alex DiPietro
(Ukraine) Anton Hladchenko
Linesmen:
(United Kingdom) Daniel Beresford
(Belgium) Frederic Monnaie

	0–1	00:35 – Tranca (Molnár) (PP)
Sarauer (Galanisz, Csányi) – 01:56	1–1
Papp (Sofron, Szabó) – 44:24	2–1
	2–2	55:09 – Butochnov (Borysenko)
Erdély (Hári, Stipsicz) – 60:15	3–2

10 min
Penalties
4 min
43
Shots
24

8 February 2020; 18:00	Estonia	1–7 (0–0, 1–4, 0–3)	Great Britain	Motorpoint Arena Nottingham, Nottingham; Attendance: 4,465

Game reference

Villem-Henrik Koitmaa
Goalies
Ben Bowns
Referees:
(Canada) Jonathan Alarie
(Austria) Ladislav Smetana
Linesmen:
(Czech Republic) Josef Špůr
(Kazakhstan) Vladimir Suslov

	0–1	22:04 – Perlini (D. Phillips)
	0–2	28:26 – Betteridge (Richardson, Connolly)
	0–3	29:18 – Conway (D. Ehrhardt)
	0–4	32:43 – Perlini (O'Connor, Hammond) (PP)
Sibirtsev (Ossipov) – 38:56	1–4
	1–5	48:40 – Lake (Farmer, Conway) (PP)
	1–6	49:04 – J. Phillips (Hammond, Lachowicz)
	1–7	54:47 – Conway (Ferrara)

4 min
Penalties
2 min
23
Shots
38

9 February 2020; 14:00	Romania	7–3 (2–2, 2–0, 3–1)	Estonia	Motorpoint Arena Nottingham, Nottingham; Attendance: 1,561

Game reference

Zoltán Tőke
Goalies
Roman Shumikhin
Villem-Henrik Koitmaa
Referees:
(Ukraine) Anton Hladchenko
(Kazakhstan) Vladimir Yefremov
Linesmen:
(United Kingdom) Daniel Beresford
(Belgium) Frederic Monnaie

Butochnov (Borysenko) – 02:05	1–0
	1–1	02:49 – Slessarevski (Lahesalu, Puzakov)
	1–2	10:52 – Saskin
Borysenko (Kirichenko) (PP) – 15:44	2–2
Rokaly (Góga) – 30:49	3–2
Tranca (B. Péter) – 34:12	4–2
Tranca (Molnár) – 41:06	5–2
	5–3	44:18 – Andrejev (Aleksandrov)
Butochnov (Constantin, Kirichenko) – 49:47	6–3
Tranca (Góga) – 53:43	7–3

6 min
Penalties
6 min
39
Shots
31

9 February 2020; 18:00	Great Britain	1–4 (0–0, 0–2, 1–2)	Hungary	Motorpoint Arena Nottingham, Nottingham; Attendance: 4,544

Game reference

Ben Bowns
Goalies
Miklós Rajna
Referees:
(Canada) Jonathan Alarie
(Austria) Ladislav Smetana
Linesmen:
(Finland) Joona Elonen
(Czech Republic) Josef Špůr

	0–1	20:32 – Stipsicz (Nagy, Hári) (PP)
	0–2	31:17 – Erdély (Stipsicz, Sofron)
Myers (PP) – 40:57	1–2
	1–3	45:11 – Hári
	1–4	52:00 – Sofron (Hári)

8 min
Penalties
24 min
48
Shots
20

== Final qualification ==
The tournaments were scheduled to take place from 27 to 30 August 2020, but were moved to 26 to 29 August 2021 due to the COVID-19 pandemic.

=== Group D ===
The tournament was held at the Ondrej Nepela Arena in Bratislava, Slovakia.

Pos	Team	Pld	W	OTW	OTL	L	GF	GA	GD	Pts	Qualification
1	Slovakia (H)	3	3	0	0	0	9	3	+6	9	2022 Winter Olympics
2	Belarus	3	1	0	0	2	6	5	+1	3 (Note: Belarus 3 Pts, +2 GD; Austria 3 Pts, 0 GD; Poland 3 Pts, –2 GD)	
3	Austria	3	1	0	0	2	7	8	−1	3	
4	Poland	3	1	0	0	2	3	9	−6	3	

Source: IIHF
Rules for classification: 1) points; 2) head-to-head points; 3) head-to-head goal difference; 4) head-to-head number of goals scored; 5) result against closest best-ranked team outside tied teams; 6) result against second-best ranked team outside tied teams; 7) seeding before tournament.
(H) Host
Notes:

All times are local (UTC+2).

26 August 2021; 15:15	Belarus	0–1 (0–0, 0–0, 0–1)	Poland	Ondrej Nepela Arena, Bratislava; Attendance: 150

Game reference
Danny Taylor	Goalies	John Murray	Referees: (Finland) Riku Brander (Switzerland) Michael Tscherrig; Linesmen: (Germany) Jonas Merten (Czech Republic) Jiří Ondráček
0–1 / 54:59 – Komorski (Łyszczarczyk)			Referees: (Finland) Riku Brander (Switzerland) Michael Tscherrig; Linesmen: (Germany) Jonas Merten (Czech Republic) Jiří Ondráček
4 min	Penalties	4 min	Referees: (Finland) Riku Brander (Switzerland) Michael Tscherrig; Linesmen: (Germany) Jonas Merten (Czech Republic) Jiří Ondráček
46	Shots	19	Referees: (Finland) Riku Brander (Switzerland) Michael Tscherrig; Linesmen: (Germany) Jonas Merten (Czech Republic) Jiří Ondráček

26 August 2021; 19:15	Austria	1–2 (0–1, 0–1, 1–0)	Slovakia	Ondrej Nepela Arena, Bratislava; Attendance: 4,241

Game reference

David Kickert
Goalies
Branislav Konrád
Referees:
(Norway) Roy Hansen
(Sweden) Linus Öhlund
Linesmen:
(Czech Republic) Daniel Hynek
(Denmark) Andreas Kroyer

	0–1	01:46 – Hudáček (Čerešňák)
	0–2	28:28 – Gernát (Čerešňák, Studenič)
Lebler (Heinrich) – 52:45	1–2

14 min
Penalties
8 min
21
Shots
32

27 August 2021; 15:15	Belarus	5–2 (0–2, 5–0, 0–0)	Austria	Ondrej Nepela Arena, Bratislava; Attendance: 148

Game reference

Danny Taylor
Goalies
Bernhard Starkbaum
David Kickert
Referees:
(Latvia) Andris Ansons
(Norway) Roy Hansen
Linesmen:
(Czech Republic) Daniel Hynek
(Germany) Jonas Merten

	0–1	08:35 – Herburger (Haudum, Baumgartner) (PP)
	0–2	18:40 – Lebler (Rossi, Zwerger)
Stas (Bailen) (PP) – 20:43	1–2
Sharangovich (Stas, Komarov) – 25:55	2–2
Sharangovich (Protas, Komarov) – 32:25	3–2
Prince (Demkov) (PP) – 36:51	4–2
Platt (Prince, Paré) – 39:38	5–2

6 min
Penalties
12 min
28
Shots
18

27 August 2021; 19:15	Slovakia	5–1 (1–0, 3–1, 1–0)	Poland	Ondrej Nepela Arena, Bratislava; Attendance: 3,685

Game reference

Branislav Konrád
Goalies
John Murray
Referees:
(Sweden) Linus Öhlund
(Switzerland) Michael Tscherrig
Linesmen:
(Denmark) Andreas Kroyer
(Latvia) Dāvis Zunde

Ružička (Čerešňák, Gernát) – 08:06	1–0
Hudáček (Čerešňák, Gernát) – 24:38	2–0
Roman (Slafkovský, Nemec) – 26:11	3–0
	3–1	30:17 – Dziubiński (Łyszczarczyk, Chmielewski) (PP)
Cehlárik (Hudáček, Jurčo) (PP) – 32:39	4–1
Ružička (Pospíšil, Lantoši) – 48:02	5–1

6 min
Penalties
12 min
48
Shots
17

29 August 2021; 13:30	Poland	1–4 (1–2, 0–1, 0–1)	Austria	Ondrej Nepela Arena, Bratislava; Attendance: 182

Game reference

John Murray
Goalies
David Kickert
Referees:
(Latvia) Andris Ansons
(Finland) Riku Brander
Linesmen:
(Czech Republic) Daniel Hynek
(Germany) Jonas Merten

	0–1	04:10 – Ganahl (Schneider, Hundertpfund)
Urbanowicz (Kolusz, Łyszczarczyk) – 11:53	1–1
	1–2	19:02 – Lebler (Haudum)
	1–3	34:38 – Lebler (Wolf)
	1–4	53:03 – Lebler (Zwerger, Rossi)

8 min
Penalties
10 min
10
Shots
30

29 August 2021; 17:30	Slovakia	2–1 (1–0, 0–1, 1–0)	Belarus	Ondrej Nepela Arena, Bratislava; Attendance: 7,105

Game reference

Branislav Konrád
Goalies
Danny Taylor
Referees:
(Sweden) Linus Öhlund
(Switzerland) Michael Tscherrig
Linesmen:
(Czech Republic) Jiří Ondráček
(Latvia) Dāvis Zunde

Cehlárik (Hrivík) (PP) – 04:38	1–0
	1–1	21:07 – Sharangovich
Hudáček (Čerešňák) (EN) – 57:43	2–1

36 min
Penalties
39 min
39
Shots
22

=== Group E ===
The tournament was played at the Arēna Rīga in Riga, Latvia.

Pos	Team	Pld	W	OTW	OTL	L	GF	GA	GD	Pts	Qualification
1	Latvia (H)	3	3	0	0	0	17	1	+16	9	2022 Winter Olympics
2	France	3	2	0	0	1	8	5	+3	6	
3	Hungary	3	1	0	0	2	5	15	−10	3	
4	Italy	3	0	0	0	3	1	10	−9	0	

Source: IIHF
Rules for classification: 1) points; 2) head-to-head points; 3) head-to-head goal difference; 4) head-to-head number of goals scored; 5) result against closest best-ranked team outside tied teams; 6) result against second-best ranked team outside tied teams; 7) seeding before tournament.
(H) Host

All times are local (UTC+3).

26 August 2021; 15:30	France	5–3 (0–2, 3–0, 2–1)	Hungary	Arena Riga, Riga; Attendance: 200

Game reference

Florian Hardy
Goalies
Zoltán Hetényi
Referees:
(Germany) André Schrader
(Austria) Christoph Sternat
Linesmen:
(Austria) Simon Riecken
(Norway) Alexander Waldejer

	0–1	12:43 – Hári (Erdély, Sofron)
	0–2	14:51 – Papp (Hári) (PP)
Texier (Chakiachvili, Bozon) (PP) – 23:09	1–2
Manavian (Da Costa, Fleury) – 28:00	2–2
Texier (Chakiachvili) (PP) – 34:45	3–2
Treille (Rech, Chakiachvili) (PP) – 45:28	4–2
	4–3	45:38 – Bartalis (Mihály, Magosi)
Fleury (Texier, Da Costa) – 56:53	5–3

8 min
Penalties
8 min
31
Shots
33

26 August 2021; 19:30	Italy	0–6 (0–2, 0–2, 0–2)	Latvia	Arena Riga, Riga; Attendance: 4,100

Game reference

Andreas Bernard
Goalies
Ivars Punnenovs
Referees:
(Denmark) Mads Frandsen
(Belarus) Maxim Sidorenko
Linesmen:
(Belarus) Dmitry Golyak
(Finland) Lauri Nikulainen

0–1	03:23 – Jaks (Dārziņš)
0–2	05:28 – Ābols (Ro. Bukarts, Daugaviņš)
0–3	26:15 – Rubins (Ri. Bukarts, Balinskis)
0–4	29:48 – Indrašis (Dārziņš) (PP2)
0–5	48:56 – Indrašis (Girgensons, Rubins)
0–6	52:54 – Daugaviņš (Punnenovs) (PP)

14 min
Penalties
6 min
16
Shots
36

27 August 2021; 16:00	France	2–0 (0–0, 2–0, 0–0)	Italy	Arena Riga, Riga; Attendance: 197

Game reference
Henri-Corentin Buysse	Goalies	Andreas Bernard	Referees: (Denmark) Mads Frandsen (Finland) Mikko Kaukokari; Linesmen: (Belarus) Dmitry Golyak (Norway) Alexander Waldejer
Treille (Gallet, Bozon) – 23:23 / 1–0; Treille (Texier, Chakiachvili) (PP) – 33:41 / 2–0			Referees: (Denmark) Mads Frandsen (Finland) Mikko Kaukokari; Linesmen: (Belarus) Dmitry Golyak (Norway) Alexander Waldejer
6 min	Penalties	8 min	Referees: (Denmark) Mads Frandsen (Finland) Mikko Kaukokari; Linesmen: (Belarus) Dmitry Golyak (Norway) Alexander Waldejer
22	Shots	23	Referees: (Denmark) Mads Frandsen (Finland) Mikko Kaukokari; Linesmen: (Belarus) Dmitry Golyak (Norway) Alexander Waldejer

27 August 2021; 20:00	Latvia	9–0 (1–0, 0–0, 8–0)	Hungary	Arena Riga, Riga; Attendance: 3,250

Game reference

Ivars Punnenovs
Goalies
Zoltán Hetényi
Referees:
(Belarus) Maxim Sidorenko
(Austria) Christoph Sternat
Linesmen:
(Austria) Simon Riecken
(Russia) Dmitri Shishlo

Ābols (Jaks, Kenins) (PP) – 07:18	1–0
Balcers (Kenins) – 40:32	2–0
Kenins (Balcers) – 42:51	3–0
Blugers (Balcers, Dārziņš) (PP) – 51:54	4–0
Ābols (Kenins, Ro. Bukarts) (PP) – 54:35	5–0
Balcers (Kenins) – 54:58	6–0
Blugers – 56:31	7–0
Balcers (Dārziņš, Indrašis) (PP) – 58:23	8–0
Kenins (Balcers, Ābols) – 58:36	9–0

0 min
Penalties
14 min
45
Shots
17

29 August 2021; 13:00	Hungary	2–1 (0–0, 1–0, 1–1)	Italy	Arena Riga, Riga; Attendance: 460

Game reference

Miklós Rajna
Goalies
Andreas Bernard
Referees:
(Germany) André Schrader
(Austria) Christoph Sternat
Linesmen:
(Austria) Simon Riecken
(Norway) Alexander Waldejer

Nagy (Sofron, Stipsicz) (PP) – 38:13	1–0
Mihály (Bartalis) – 47:23	2–0
	2–1	53:07 – Morini (Frigo, Kostner)

14 min
Penalties
10 min
24
Shots
30

29 August 2021; 17:00	Latvia	2–1 (1–0, 0–0, 1–1)	France	Arena Riga, Riga; Attendance: 7,954

Game reference

Ivars Punnenovs
Goalies
Henri-Corentin Buysse
Referees:
(Finland) Mikko Kaukokari
(Belarus) Maxim Sidorenko
Linesmen:
(Finland) Lauri Nikulainen
(Russia) Dmitri Shishlo

Ri. Bukarts – 10:56	1–0
Indrašis (Bļugers, Balinskis) (PP) – 45:50	2–0
	2–1	51:15 – Da Costa

8 min
Penalties
8 min
26
Shots
30

=== Group F ===
The tournament was played at the Jordal Amfi in Oslo, Norway.

Pos	Team	Pld	W	OTW	OTL	L	GF	GA	GD	Pts	Qualification
1	Denmark	3	3	0	0	0	17	4	+13	9	2022 Winter Olympics
2	Norway (H)	3	2	0	0	1	11	7	+4	6	
3	Slovenia	3	1	0	0	2	11	12	−1	3	
4	South Korea	3	0	0	0	3	3	19	−16	0	

Source: IIHF
Rules for classification: 1) points; 2) head-to-head points; 3) head-to-head goal difference; 4) head-to-head number of goals scored; 5) result against closest best-ranked team outside tied teams; 6) result against second-best ranked team outside tied teams; 7) seeding before tournament.
(H) Host

All times are local (UTC+2).

26 August 2021; 15:00	Denmark	4–3 (3–0, 1–1, 0–2)	Slovenia	Jordal Amfi, Oslo; Attendance: 174

Game reference

Sebastian Dahm
Goalies
Gašper Krošelj
Referees:
(Finland) Lassi Heikkinen
(Russia) Sergey Yudakov
Linesmen:
(Norway) Knut Bråten
(Switzerland) David Obwegeser

Ehlers (M. Lauridsen, Bjorkstrand) (PP) – 02:17	1–0
Storm (M. Lauridsen, Bjorkstrand) (PP) – 12:59	2–0
Russell (O. Lauridsen) – 14:52	3–0
	3–1	20:49 – Drozg (Kopitar, Pretnar) (PP)
Ehlers – 21:51	4–1
	4–2	49:20 – Urbas (Gregorc, Jeglič) (PP)
	4–3	57:28 – Verlič (Gregorc, Jeglič)

10 min
Penalties
10 min
21
Shots
23

26 August 2021; 19:00	South Korea	1–4 (1–2, 0–1, 0–1)	Norway	Jordal Amfi, Oslo; Attendance: 1,483

Game reference

Matt Dalton
Goalies
Henrik Haukeland
Referees:
(Sweden) Christoffer Holm
(Slovakia) Peter Stano
Linesmen:
(France) Niolas Constantineau
(Sweden) Ludvig Lundgren

Kim K. (Shin Sang-w., Shin Sang-h.) – 05:47	1–0
	1–1	06:07 – Lesund (Olden, Trettenes)
	1–2	08:32 – K. Olimb (Rosseli Olsen)
	1–3	24:22 – Espeland (Rosseli Olsen, K. Olimb)
	1–4	49:35 – Lindström (Kåsastul, Espeland)

6 min
Penalties
4 min
9
Shots
49

27 August 2021; 17:00	Denmark	11–1 (1–1, 7–0, 3–0)	South Korea	Jordal Amfi, Oslo; Attendance: 207

Game reference

Sebastian Dahm
Goalies
Matt Dalton
Hwang Hyun-ho
Referees:
(France) Geoffrey Barcelo
(Russia) Sergey Yudakov
Linesmen:
(Sweden) Ludvig Lundgren
(Slovakia) Simon Synek

	0–1	13:29 – Kim K. (Kim S., Lee Jo.) (PP)
Blichfeld (M. Lauridsen, O. Lauridsen) – 19:07	1–1
Ehlers (M. Lauridsen, Storm) (PP) – 20:43	2–1
Bjorkstrand (M. Lauridsen, Ehlers) (PP) – 25:02	3–1
Poulsen (Larsen, Jakobsen) – 27:00	4–1
Bjorkstrand (Ehlers, Jensen Aabo) – 27:29	5–1
Bjorkstrand (Ehlers, M. Lauridsen) (PP) – 30:26	6–1
Storm – 31:56	7–1
Blichfeld (Ehlers, Storm) (PP) – 34:40	8–1
Ehlers (Nielsen, Jensen Aabo) – 40:17	9–1
Russell (Storm) – 41:54	10–1
Poulsen (N. Jensen, Jakobsen) – 53:36	11–1

6 min
Penalties
10 min
48
Shots
8

27 August 2021; 21:00	Norway	7–4 (3–2, 3–0, 1–2)	Slovenia	Jordal Amfi, Oslo; Attendance: 2,490

Game reference

Henrik Haukeland
Goalies
Gašper Krošelj
Luka Gračnar
Referees:
(Finland) Lassi Heikkinen
(Slovakia) Peter Stano
Linesmen:
(France) Niolas Constantineau
(Switzerland) David Obwegeser

Røymark (Salsten, Lesund) – 06:04	1–0
Kåsastul (Olden, Zuccarello) – 06:57	2–0
K. Olimb (Rosseli Olsen) (SH) – 09:04	3–0
	3–1	12:34 – Gregorc (Ograjenšek, Jeglič) (PP)
	3–2	13:54 – Sabolič (Kopitar, Drozg)
Zuccarello (PS) – 24:27	4–2
M. Olimb (K. Olimb) – 38:04	5–2
Rosseli Olsen (K. Olimb, M. Olimb) – 39:33	6–2
	6–3	43:04 – Sabolič (Pretnar, Kopitar) (PP)
	6–4	43:49 – Čepon (Ograjenšek, Logar)
Kåsastul (Martinsen, Haga) – 55:48	7–4

14 min
Penalties
10 min
31
Shots
21

29 August 2021; 12:00	Slovenia	4–1 (0–1, 3–0, 1–0)	South Korea	Jordal Amfi, Oslo; Attendance: 97

Game reference

Gašper Krošelj
Goalies
Matt Dalton
Referees:
(France) Geoffrey Barcelo
(Finland) Lassi Heikkinen
Linesmen:
(Norway) Knut Bråten
(Slovakia) Simon Synek

	0–1	19:03 – Ahn (Kim K., Jung) (PP)
Jeglič (Urbas, Kopitar) (PP2) – 30:40	1–1
Tičar (Kopitar, Gregorc) (PP) – 32:46	2–1
Sabolič (Tičar, Kopitar) – 35:12	3–1
Kopitar (SH, EN) – 59:45	4–1

12 min
Penalties
12 min
43
Shots
18

29 August 2021; 16:00	Norway	0–2 (0–0, 0–1, 0–1)	Denmark	Jordal Amfi, Oslo; Attendance: 2,500

Game reference
Henrik Haukeland	Goalies	Sebastian Dahm	Referees: (Sweden) Christoffer Holm (Russia) Sergey Yudakov; Linesmen: (Sweden) Ludvig Lundgren (Switzerland) David Obwegeser
0–1 / 37:49 – Storm (M. Lauridsen, Blichfeld); 0–2 / 56:48 – Ehlers (Nielsen)			Referees: (Sweden) Christoffer Holm (Russia) Sergey Yudakov; Linesmen: (Sweden) Ludvig Lundgren (Switzerland) David Obwegeser
8 min	Penalties	8 min	Referees: (Sweden) Christoffer Holm (Russia) Sergey Yudakov; Linesmen: (Sweden) Ludvig Lundgren (Switzerland) David Obwegeser
26	Shots	19	Referees: (Sweden) Christoffer Holm (Russia) Sergey Yudakov; Linesmen: (Sweden) Ludvig Lundgren (Switzerland) David Obwegeser
