= Dražen Petrović Basketball Hall =

Indoor arena in Croatia

Coordinates: 45°48′9.22″N 15°57′47.76″E

- Košarkaški centar Dražen Petrović
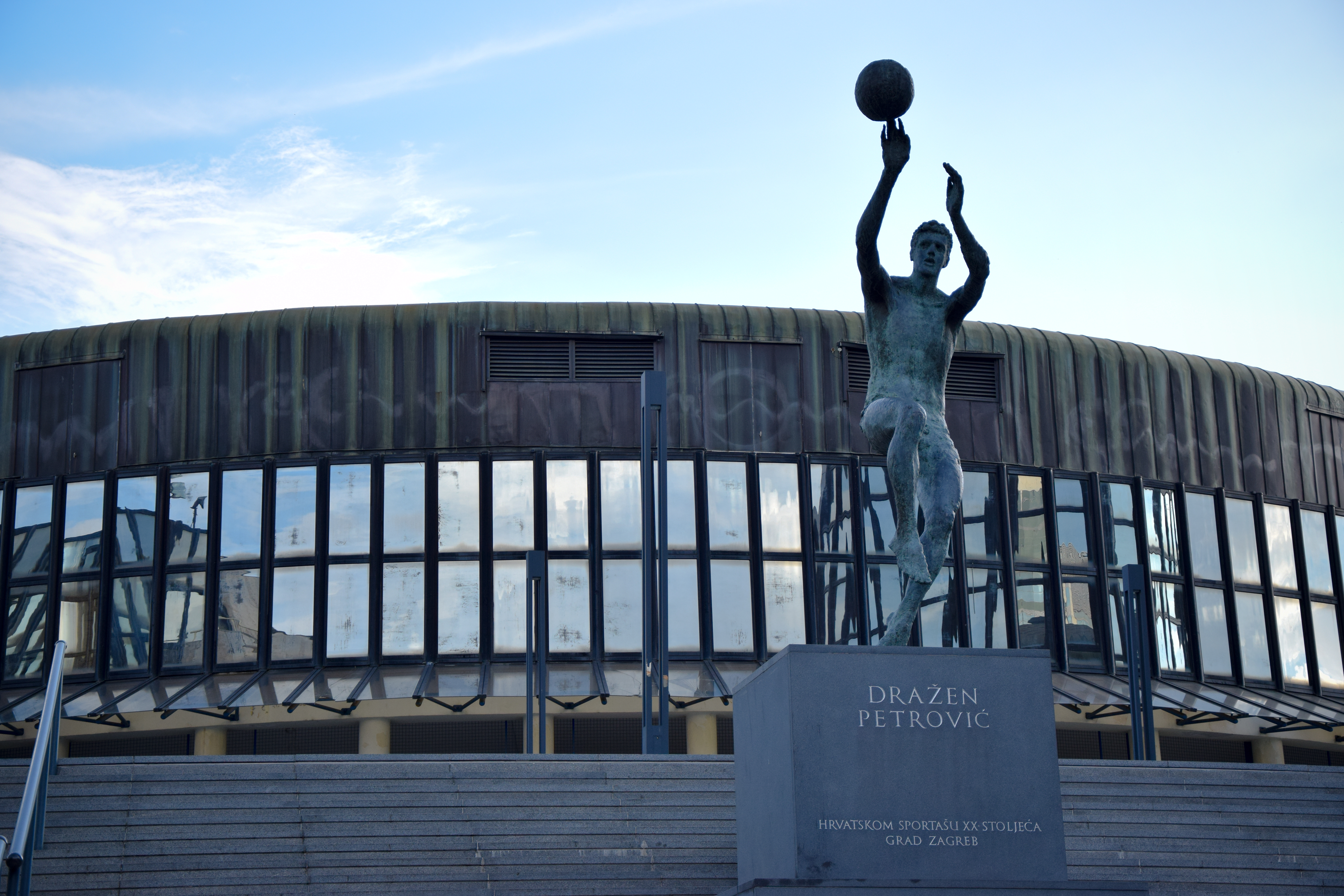
- Dražen Petrović statue at the front of the Arena
- Interactive map of Dražen Petrović Basketball Hall
- Former names: Sportski centar Cibona (1987–1993)
- Address: Savska cesta 30
- Location: Zagreb, Croatia
- Owner: City of Zagreb
- Capacity: 5,400
- Surface: Hardwood
- Scoreboard: Yes

Construction
- Opened: 30 June 1987; 38 years ago
- Architect: Marijan Hržić

Tenants
- Cibona (1993–present)

The Dražen Petrović Basketball Hall (Croatian: Košarkaški centar Dražen Petrović), formerly known as Cibona Sports Centre (Croatian: Sportski centar Cibona), is an indoor sports arena located in Zagreb, Croatia. The official seating capacity of the arena is 5,400.

== History ==
The arena was built in 1987, to be used at the 1987 Summer Universiade and was then known as the Cibona Sports Centre (Croatian: Sportski centar Cibona). On 4 October 1993, it was renamed after the late former NBA player and basketball Hall of Famer, Dražen Petrović, a former Cibona Zagreb star. On 7 June 2006, on the occasion of the 13th anniversary of the death of Dražen Petrović, a museum-memorial center bearing his name was opened next to the hall. Petrović died in 1993, in a car accident, cutting his great career short.

=== Events ===
Cardinal Franjo Kuharić organized the first Christmas in Cibona concert in 1989, and since then it has been held annually.

Artists that have performed at the hall include: Michael Bolton, Boney M, James Brown, José Carreras, Joe Cocker, Bryan Ferry, Diana Krall, Muse, Nightwish, Pain, Pet Shop Boys, P!nk, Marcus & Martinus, Seal and Simple Minds, among others.

== Gallery ==
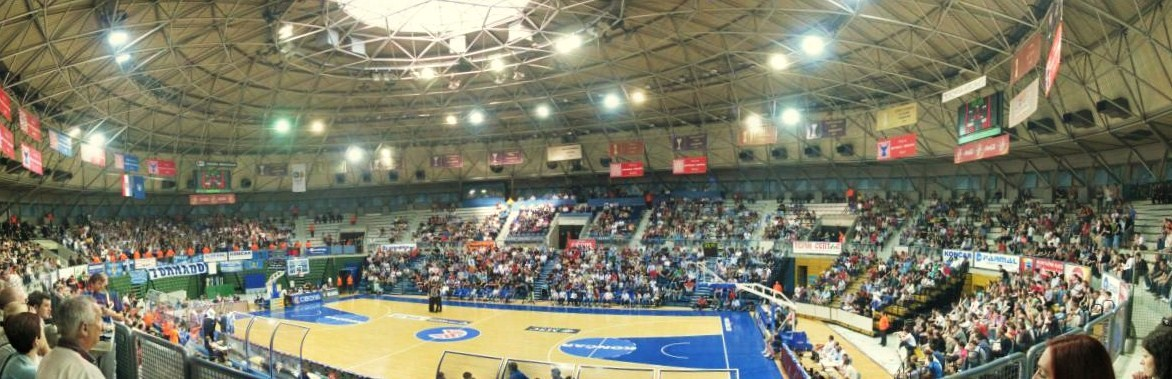
Interior

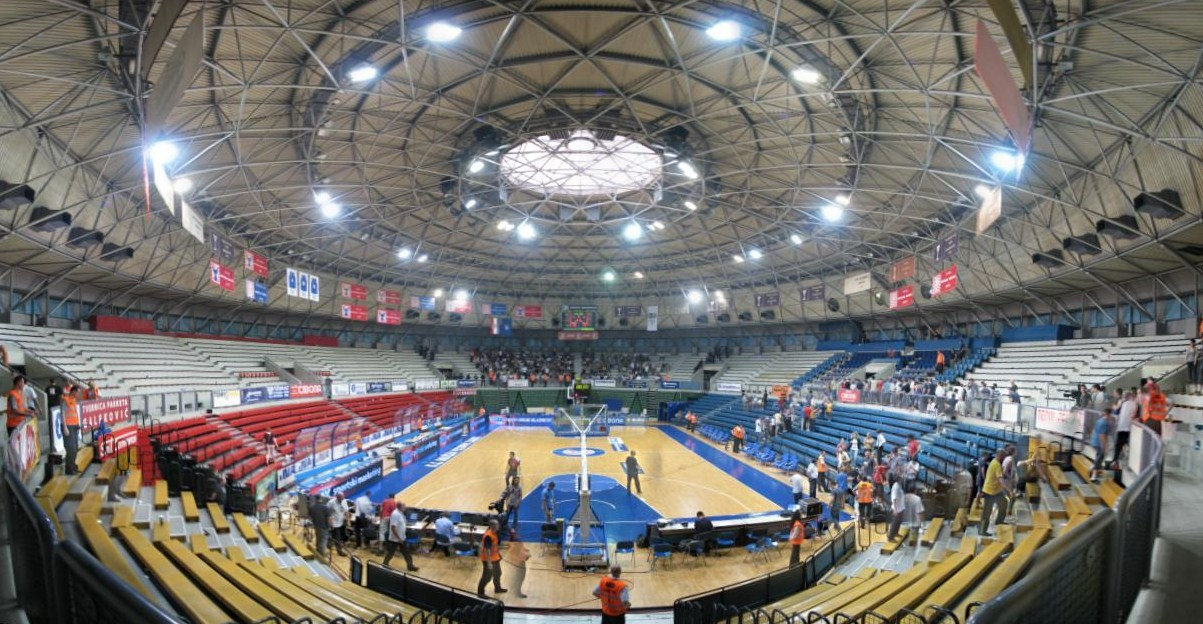
Interior

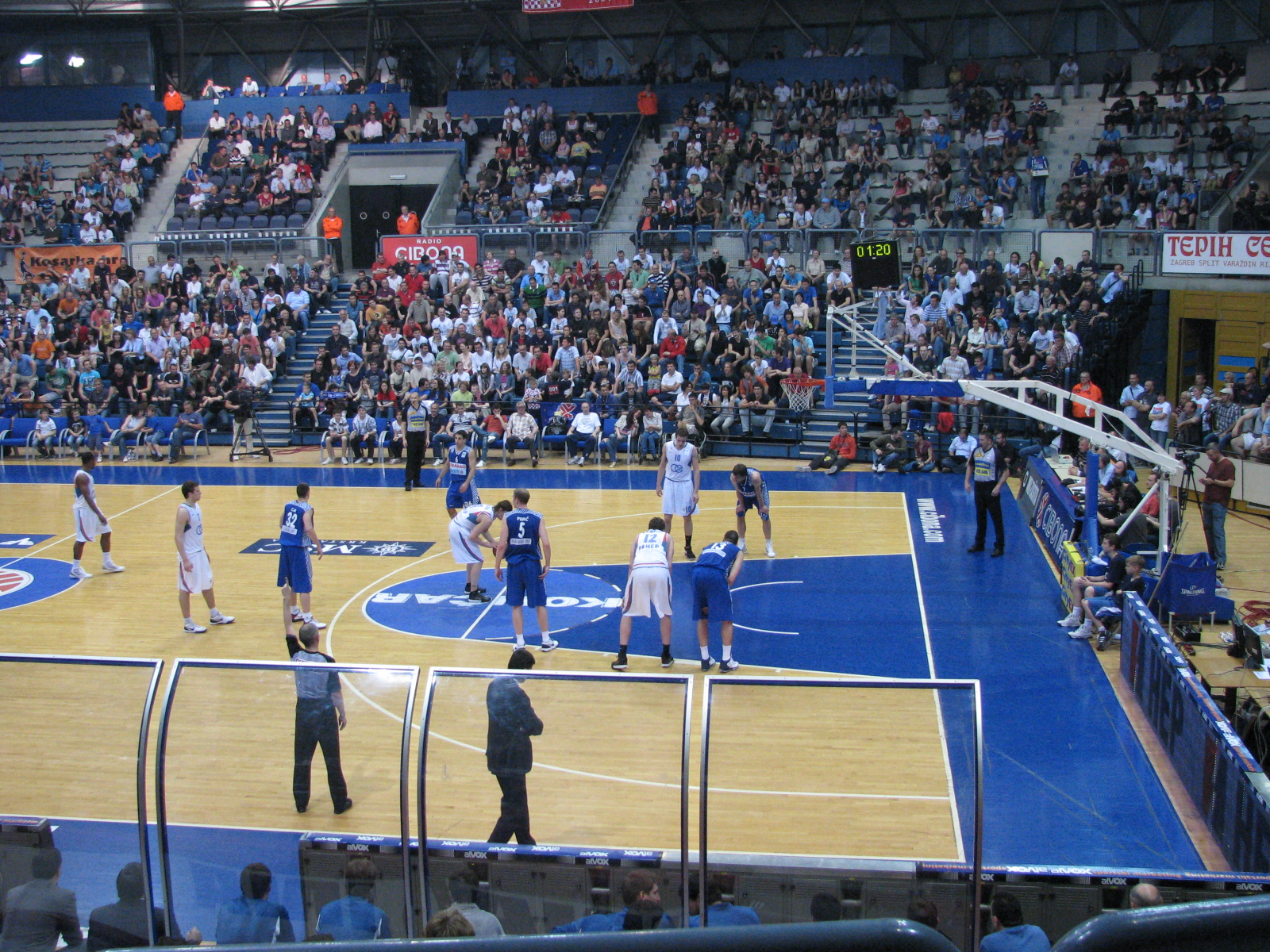
Cibona vs. KK Zadar, 2010

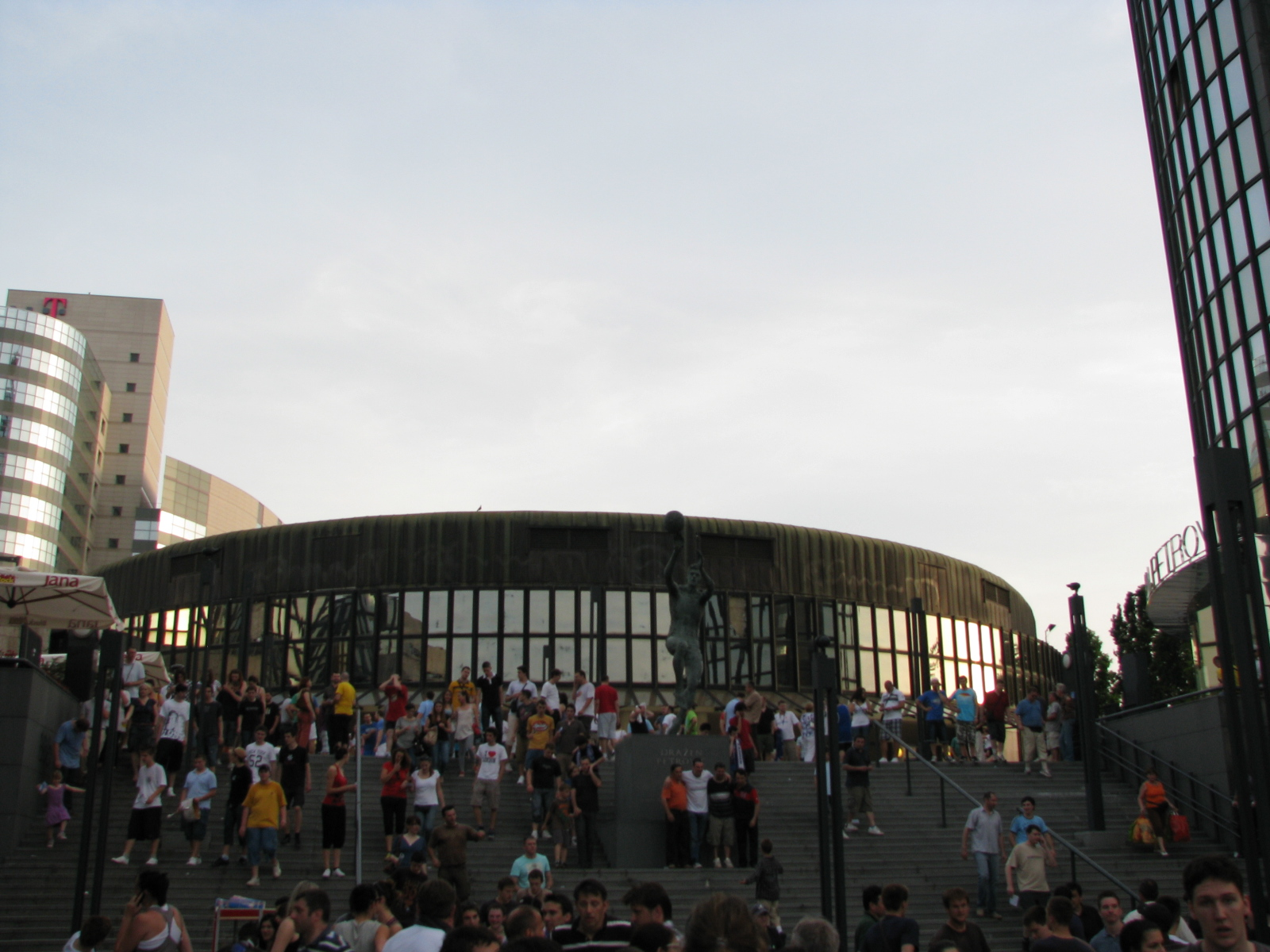
Arena Entrance

== See also ==
- List of indoor arenas in Croatia
- List of indoor arenas in Europe
