= Ledena dvorana Zibel =

Ice hall in Sisak, Croatia

- Zibel
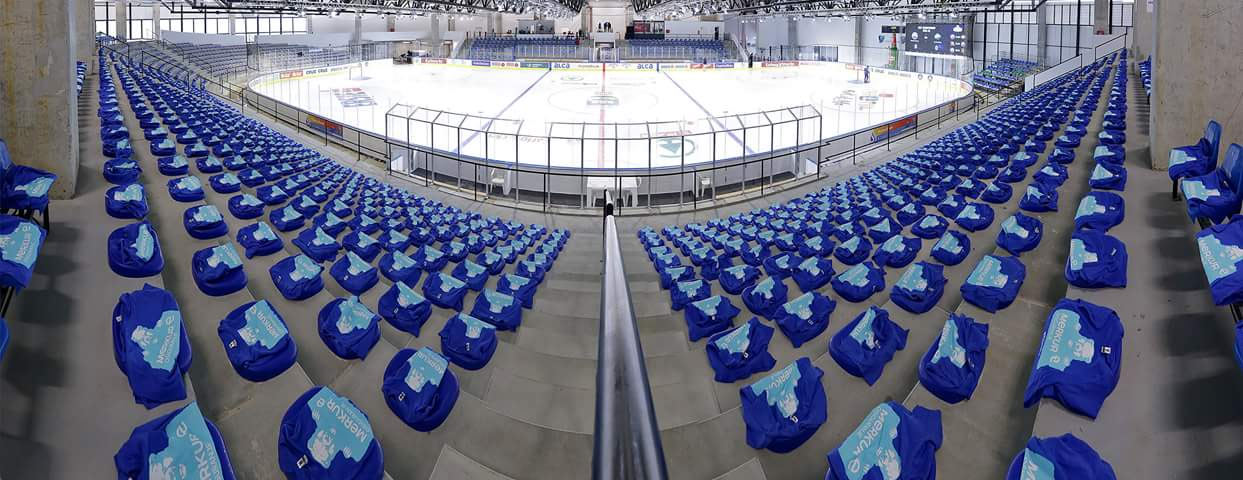
- Interactive map of Ledena dvorana Zibel
- Location: Sisak, Croatia
- Coordinates: 45°28′42.4″N 16°21′55″E
- Owner: City of Sisak
- Operator: SRC Sisak
- Capacity: 1,960
- Scoreboard: Yes

Construction
- Opened: 27 January 2018; 8 years ago
- Architect: KAP4

Tenants
- KHL Sisak; Croatia men's national ice hockey team HK Siscia

Website
- src-sisak.hr/centri/ledena-dvorana-zibel/

Ledena dvorana Zibel is an ice hall in Sisak, Croatia. It was opened on January 27, 2018, and has 1,960 seats.

== Events ==
=== Ice hockey ===
- December 13–15, 2019 Men's olympic qualification preliminary round 2, Group M

=== Figure skating competition ===
- December 7–11, 2021 2021 CS Golden Spin of Zagreb
- December 7–10, 2022 2022 CS Golden Spin of Zagreb

=== Concerts ===
- Hladno pivo had a concert. 26. October 2018
- S.A.R.S. had a concert. 22. December 2018

== See also ==
- List of indoor arenas in Croatia
- List of indoor arenas in Europe
