= Brendan Connolly =

English ice hockey player (born 1985)

- Born: 15 September 1985 (age 40) Canmore, Alberta, Canada
- Height: 1.73 m (5 ft 8 in)
- Weight: 82 kg (181 lb; 12 st 13 lb)
- Position: Centre
- Shot: Left
- Played for: Adirondack Phantoms; Texas Stars; Abbotsford Heat; Fehérvár AV19; SC Riessersee; Rungsted Seier Capital; Belfast Giants; Glasgow Clan; Sheffield Steelers
- National team: Great Britain
- NHL draft: Undrafted
- Playing career: 2009–2023

Brendan Connolly (born 15 September 1985) is a Canadian-born British former ice hockey player.

== Playing career ==
He played for Sheffield Steelers.

== International play ==
He represented Great Britain at the 2021 IIHF World Championship.

== Career statistics ==
=== Regular season and playoffs ===
			Regular season					Playoffs
Season	Team	League	GP	G	A	Pts	PIM	GP	G	A	Pts	PIM
2001–02	Canmore Eagles	AJHL	14	0	2	2	14	—	—	—	—	—
2002–03	Canmore Eagles	AJHL	35	4	8	12	74	—	—	—	—	—
2002–03	Brooks Bandits	AJHL	17	2	6	8	65	—	—	—	—	—
2003–04	Brooks Bandits	AJHL	56	17	22	39	199	—	—	—	—	—
2004–05	Brooks Bandits	AJHL	58	31	53	84	210	—	—	—	—	—
2005–06	Ferris State University	NCAA	36	1	6	7	50	—	—	—	—	—
2006–07	Ferris State University	NCAA	38	11	11	22	55	—	—	—	—	—
2007–08	Ferris State University	NCAA	38	13	11	24	72	—	—	—	—	—
2008–09	Ferris State University	NCAA	35	10	18	28	109	—	—	—	—	—
2008–09	Elmira Jackals	ECHL	12	7	6	13	10	8	2	2	4	10
2009–10	Elmira Jackals	ECHL	55	12	14	26	81	5	2	3	5	8
2010–11	Greenville Road Warriors	ECHL	45	22	28	50	76	10	7	3	10	24
2010–11	Adirondack Phantoms	AHL	3	0	0	0	2	—	—	—	—	—
2011–12	Greenville Road Warriors	ECHL	40	24	32	56	143	3	1	1	2	16
2011–12	Texas Stars	AHL	12	0	2	2	7	—	—	—	—	—
2012–13	Greenville Road Warriors	ECHL	65	24	36	60	113	5	0	1	1	6
2013–14	Abbotsford Heat	AHL	6	1	1	2	0	—	—	—	—	—
2013–14	Alaska Aces	ECHL	51	22	27	49	109	19	3	16	19	36
2014–15	Alaska Aces	ECHL	62	31	46	77	112	—	—	—	—	—
2015–16	Fehérvár AV19	EBEL	36	10	17	27	62	—	—	—	—	—
2015–16	SC Riessersee	DEL2	15	5	10	15	47	3	2	0	2	8
2016–17	Rungsted Seier Capital	Metal Ligaen	42	20	28	48	186	2	0	1	1	4
2017–18	Belfast Giants	EIHL	53	27	46	73	154	2	0	0	0	2
2018–19	Glasgow Clan	EIHL	58	31	34	65	92	—	—	—	—	—
2019–20	Sheffield Steelers	EIHL	48	26	29	55	86	—	—	—	—	—
2020–21	Greenville Swamp Rabbits	ECHL	18	4	5	9	14	—	—	—	—	—
2020–21	Sheffield Steelers	Elite Series	15	6	11	17	19	—	—	—	—	—
2021–22	Sheffield Steelers	EIHL	9	2	7	9	20	—	—	—	—	—
2022–23	Sheffield Steelers	EIHL	44	10	13	23	46	4	1	3	4	2
ECHL totals			348	146	194	340	658	50	15	26	41	100
AHL totals			21	1	3	4	9	—	—	—	—	—

=== International ===
Year	Team	Event	GP	G	A	Pts	PIM
2020	Great Britain	OGQ	3	1	1	2	0
2021	Great Britain	WC	7	1	1	2	8
Senior totals			10	2	2	4	8
