= List of indoor arenas in Croatia =

The following is a list of indoor arenas in Croatia, ordered by capacity. The venues are by their final capacity after construction for seating-only events. There is more capacity if standing room is included (e.g. for concerts). Indoor stadiums with a capacity of 1,000 or higher are included.

== Current arenas ==
Image	Stadium	Capacity	City	Team	Inaugurated
	Arena Zagreb	16,500	Zagreb	KHL Medveščak; RK Zagreb	2008
	Spaladium Arena	12,000	Split	International	2008
	Krešimir Ćosić Hall	9,000	Zadar	KK Zadar	2008
	Arena Gripe	6,000	Split	KK Split	1979
	Dražen Petrović Hall	5,400	Zagreb	KK Cibona	1987
	Varaždin Arena	5,200	Varaždin	GRK Varaždin	2008
	Dom Sportova	5,000 (Hall 1); 3,100 (Hall 2)	Zagreb	KK Cedevita; KHL Medveščak	1972
	Gradski vrt Hall	4,438	Osijek	KK Vrijednosnice	2008
	Žatika Sport Centre	3,700	Poreč	RK Poreč	2008
	Metković Sports Hall	3,500	Metković	RK Metković	1982
	Dvorana Mladosti	2,960	Rijeka		1973
	Borovo Sports Hall	3,000	Vukovar	KK Borovo Vukovar	1978
	Jazine Basketball Hall	3,000	Zadar	KK Jazine	1968
	Mladost Hall	2,800	Karlovac	HRK Karlovac	1967
	Boško Božić Hall	2,500	Zagreb	KK Zagreb	1982
	Centar Zamet	2,350	Rijeka	RK Zamet	2009
	Mate Parlov Sport Centre	2,312	Pula	RK Arena Pula	1978
	Gradska Školska Sportska Dvorana	2,000	Gospić		
	Ledena dvorana Zibel	1,960	Sisak	KHL Sisak; Croatia men's national ice hockey team	2018
	Sportska dvorana Baldekin	1,726	Šibenik	MNK Crnica Šibenik; GKK Šibenik; MNK Šibenik 1983; OK Šibenik 91; ŽKK Šibenik	1973
	Sportska dvorana Zeleni Brijeg	1,500	Sisak	OK Sisak; RK Sisak (handball); KK Sisak	2021
	Školsko-športska dvorana Bjelvar	1,400	Bjelovar		
	Sportska dvorana Marino Cvetković	1,217	Opatija		2013
	Športska dvorana Gospino polje	1,400	Dubrovnik		1981
	Športska dvorana Trešnjevka	1,000	Zagreb		
	Športska dvorana Dinko Lukarić	1,000	Rijeka	KK Kvarner 2010	

== See also ==
- List of indoor arenas in Europe
- List of indoor arenas by capacity
- Lists of stadiums
