= Lasse Kopitz =

German ice hockey player

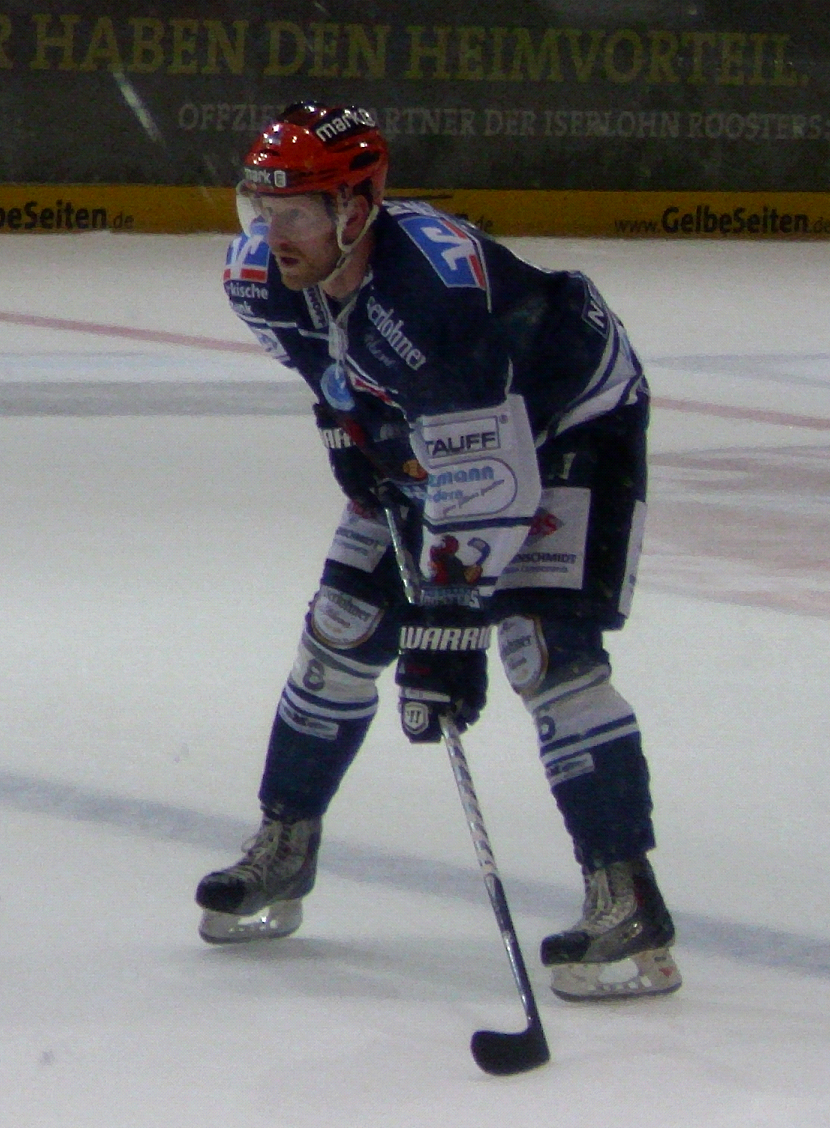
- Lasse kopitz
- Born: May 21, 1980 (age 44); Berlin, Germany
- Height: 6 ft 3 in (191 cm)
- Weight: 198 lb (90 kg; 14 st 2 lb)
- Position: Defence
- Shot: Left
- Played for: Krefeld Pinguine; Revier Löwen Oberhausen; Iserlohn Roosters; Nürnberg Ice Tigers; Kölner Haie; Frankfurt Lions
- National team: Germany
- NHL draft: Undrafted
- Playing career: 1999–2014

Lasse Kopitz (born May 21, 1980) is a German former professional ice hockey defenceman. He most notably played for the Iserlohn Roosters in the Deutsche Eishockey Liga (DEL).

== Career statistics ==
=== Regular season and playoffs ===
			Regular season					Playoffs
Season	Team	League	GP	G	A	Pts	PIM	GP	G	A	Pts	PIM
1997–98	Färjestad BK	J20	25	3	0	3	28	—	—	—	—	—
1998–99	Färjestad BK	J20	35	12	2	14	30	—	—	—	—	—
1999–2000	Krefeld Pinguine	DEL	9	0	0	0	0	—	—	—	—	—
1999–2000	EV Duisburg	DEU.3	46	8	16	24	108	—	—	—	—	—
2000–01	Krefeld Pinguine	DEL	1	0	0	0	0	—	—	—	—	—
2000–01	EV Duisburg	DEU.3	35	8	12	20	82	11	1	0	1	14
2001–02	Revierlöwen Oberhausen	DEL	59	3	5	8	24	—	—	—	—	—
2002–03	Iserlohn Roosters	DEL	48	5	3	8	44	—	—	—	—	—
2003–04	Nürnberg Ice Tigers	DEL	49	4	16	20	60	6	1	2	3	14
2004–05	Nürnberg Ice Tigers	DEL	50	10	18	28	84	6	1	1	2	6
2005–06	Kölner Haie	DEL	52	11	12	23	44	6	1	0	1	8
2006–07	Kölner Haie	DEL	45	6	4	10	72	8	0	2	2	37
2007–08	Frankfurt Lions	DEL	42	5	6	11	60	12	0	1	1	16
2008–09	Frankfurt Lions	DEL	39	2	11	13	54	5	0	0	0	0
2009–10	Frankfurt Lions	DEL	47	4	5	9	26	4	0	0	0	0
2010–11	Iserlohn Roosters	DEL	47	2	8	10	60	—	—	—	—	—
2011–12	Iserlohn Roosters	DEL	45	1	8	9	42	2	0	0	0	0
2012–13	Iserlohn Roosters	DEL	51	1	9	10	34	—	—	—	—	—
2013–14	Iserlohn Roosters	DEL	46	2	3	5	44	9	0	3	3	12
DEL totals			630	56	108	164	648	58	3	9	12	93

=== International ===
Year	Team	Event	GP	G	A	Pts	PIM
1998	Germany	EJC B	6	2	3	5	8
1999	Germany	WJC B	5	1	1	2	2
2000	Germany	WJC B	5	0	1	1	29
2003	Germany	WC	4	1	0	1	2
2004	Germany	WCH	3	0	0	0	4
2005	Germany	WC	6	0	0	0	4
2006	Germany	OG	4	0	0	0	0
Junior totals			16	3	5	8	39
Senior totals			17	1	0	1	10
