= Karol Csányi =

Slovak-Hungarian ice hockey player

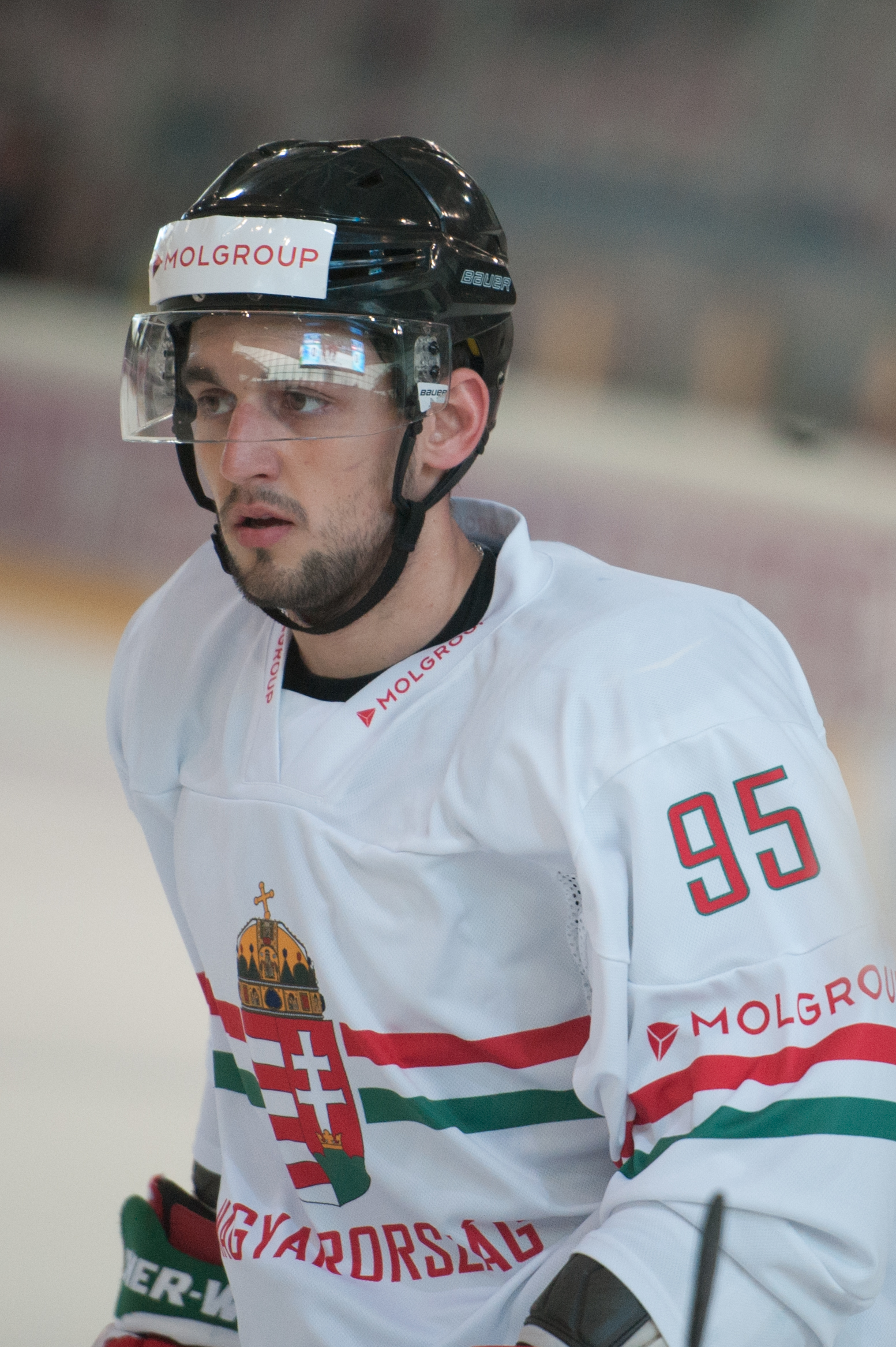
- Born: January 24, 1991 (age 34); Komárno, Czechoslovakia
- Height: 6 ft 0 in (183 cm)
- Weight: 192 lb (87 kg; 13 st 10 lb)
- Position: Forward
- Shoots: Left
- Slovak team Former teams: HK Nitra; New Mexico Mustangs; Lev Poprad; Patriot Budapest; Újpesti TE; KRS Heilongjiang; DVTK Jegesmedvék; HKm Zvolen
- National team: Hungary
- NHL draft: Undrafted
- Playing career: 2011–present

Karol Csányi (born January 24, 1991) is a Slovak-Hungarian professional ice hockey winger currently playing for HK Nitra of the Slovak Extraliga.

He previously played two games for Lev Poprad of the Kontinental Hockey League (KHL) during the 2011–12 season.

== Career statistics ==
=== Regular season and playoffs ===
			Regular season					Playoffs
Season	Team	League	GP	G	A	Pts	PIM	GP	G	A	Pts	PIM
