= Palau de Gel =

Ice hockey arena

Coordinates: 41°22′50″N 2°07′11″E

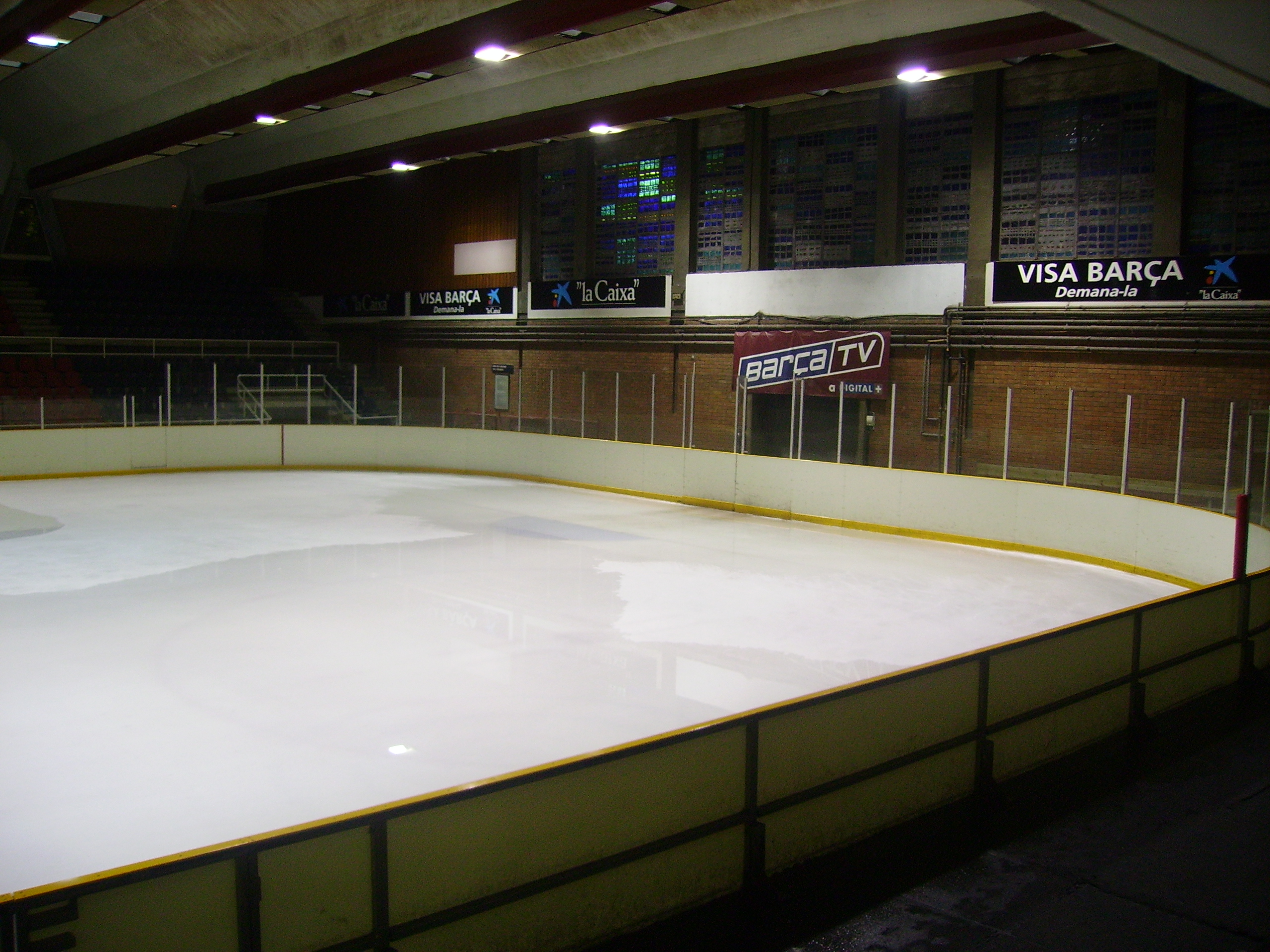
- Interactive map of Palau de Gel
- Location: Barcelona, Spain
- Owner: Futbol Club Barcelona
- Capacity: 1,256

Construction
- Opened: 23 October 1971
- Architects: Francesc Cavaller; Josep Soteras

Tenant
- FC Barcelona Ice Hockey (LNHH)

The Palau de Gel (Catalan pronunciation: [pəˈlaw ðə ˈʒɛl]; English: "Ice Palace") is an ice sports arena in Les Corts, Barcelona, which was formerly the home of the ice hockey division of FC Barcelona. The arena has a seating capacity of 1,256. It is located between the Camp Nou and the site of the demolished Mini Estadi, a few meters north of the Palau Blaugrana. The building was closed in 2022, pending extensive redevelopment works, and replaced with a temporary facility around 1km away from the original site.

The building occupies 3,650 square metres (39,300 sq ft) and the playing area is 61 metres (200 ft) long by 26 metres (85 ft) wide.

== History ==
Palau de Gel was opened on 23 October 1971, along with the Palau Blaugrana. It was designed by architects Francesc Cavaller and Josep Soteras. The arena hosted several international ice hockey and figure skating tournaments.

Palau de Gel has also been the scene of a World Fencing Championship and two World Roller Hockey category C championships. During the 1992 Summer Olympics, the indoor arena has served as a warm-up area for several sports including judo, taekwondo and roller hockey.

== Redevelopment works ==
In 2022, FC Barcelona announced that the Palau de Gel was to be extensively renovated and extended. From 2023, the Palau was being used to house a temporary museum for the club.

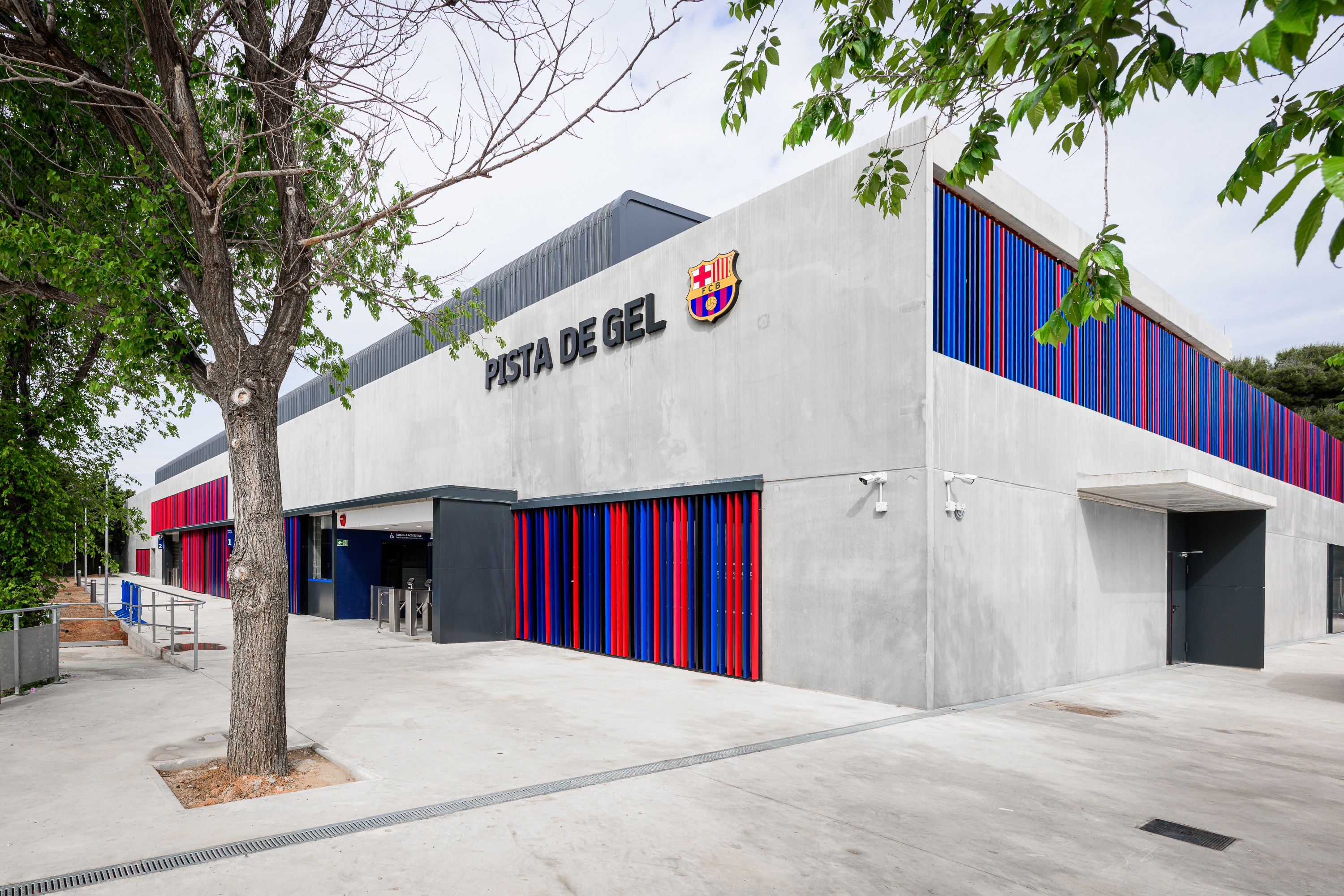
FC Barcelona temporary ice rink facility, May 2026–present

After a period of closure and lack of available facilities for ice sports at the club, the temporary Pista de Gel facility was opened in May 2026 in the Les Corts district of Barcelona, on land ceded temporarily by the University of Barcelona for the project. Works on the original Palau building remain ongoing, while a permanent replacement for the Palau de Gel is slated for opening in 2029 as part of the Espai Barça redevelopment project.

== See also ==
- FC Barcelona (Main body and football club)
- FC Barcelona Ice Hockey
