= 2021 IIHF World Championship rosters =

Each team's roster consisted of at least 15 skaters (forwards and defencemen) and two goaltenders, and at most 25 skaters and three goaltenders. All 16 participating nations, through the confirmation of their respective national associations, had to submit a roster by the first IIHF directorate meeting.

Age and team as of 21 May 2021.

== Group A ==
=== Belarus ===
A 27-player roster was announced on 11 May 2021. On 18 May, the final squad was revealed.

Head coach: Mikhail Zakharov

No.	Pos.	Name	Height	Weight	Birthdate	Team
2	D	Ilya Solovyov	1.89 m (6 ft 2 in)	90 kg (200 lb)	20 July 2000 (aged 20)	(Belarus) Dinamo Minsk
7	D	Stepan Falkovsky	2.05 m (6 ft 9 in)	112 kg (247 lb)	18 December 1996 (aged 24)	(Belarus) Dinamo Minsk
8	D	Ilya Shinkevich	1.88 m (6 ft 2 in)	85 kg (187 lb)	1 September 1989 (aged 31)	(Belarus) Dinamo Minsk
9	F	Stanislav Lopachuk	1.80 m (5 ft 11 in)	78 kg (172 lb)	16 February 1992 (aged 29)	(Belarus) Yunost Minsk
10	D	Nick Bailen	1.74 m (5 ft 9 in)	81 kg (179 lb)	12 December 1989 (aged 31)	(Russia) Traktor Chelyabinsk
12	F	Aliaksei Protas	1.98 m (6 ft 6 in)	97 kg (214 lb)	6 January 2001 (aged 20)	(United States) Hershey Bears
13	F	Mikhail Stefanovich	1.90 m (6 ft 3 in)	95 kg (209 lb)	27 November 1989 (aged 31)	(Belarus) Yunost Minsk
14	D	Yevgeni Lisovets	1.82 m (6 ft 0 in)	86 kg (190 lb)	12 November 1994 (aged 26)	(Russia) Salavat Yulaev Ufa
15	F	Artem Demkov	1.74 m (5 ft 9 in)	80 kg (180 lb)	26 September 1989 (aged 31)	(Belarus) Dinamo Minsk
16	F	Geoff Platt – A	1.76 m (5 ft 9 in)	80 kg (180 lb)	10 July 1985 (aged 35)	(Russia) Salavat Yulaev Ufa
17	F	Yegor Sharangovich – C	1.87 m (6 ft 2 in)	92 kg (203 lb)	6 June 1998 (aged 22)	(United States) New Jersey Devils
18	D	Kristian Khenkel – A	1.86 m (6 ft 1 in)	88 kg (194 lb)	7 November 1995 (aged 25)	(Russia) Ak Bars Kazan
19	F	Nikita Komarov	1.88 m (6 ft 2 in)	92 kg (203 lb)	28 June 1988 (aged 32)	(Russia) Avangard Omsk
21	F	Vladislav Kodola	1.76 m (5 ft 9 in)	80 kg (180 lb)	30 October 1996 (aged 24)	(Russia) Severstal Cherepovets
22	F	Francis Paré	1.78 m (5 ft 10 in)	86 kg (190 lb)	30 June 1987 (aged 33)	(Belarus) Dinamo Minsk
30	G	Konstantin Shostak	1.81 m (5 ft 11 in)	81 kg (179 lb)	28 March 2000 (aged 21)	(Russia) Severstal Cherepovets
31	G	Danny Taylor	1.84 m (6 ft 0 in)	85 kg (187 lb)	28 April 1986 (aged 35)	(Belarus) Dinamo Minsk
40	G	Alexei Kolosov	1.86 m (6 ft 1 in)	85 kg (187 lb)	4 January 2002 (aged 19)	(Belarus) Dinamo Minsk
73	D	Dmitri Znakharenko	1.82 m (6 ft 0 in)	91 kg (201 lb)	4 August 1993 (aged 27)	(Belarus) Dinamo Minsk
74	F	Sergei Kostitsyn	1.83 m (6 ft 0 in)	88 kg (194 lb)	20 March 1987 (aged 34)	(Slovakia) Bratislava Capitals
81	F	Sergei Drozd	1.82 m (6 ft 0 in)	79 kg (174 lb)	14 April 1990 (aged 31)	(Belarus) Yunost Minsk
85	D	Andrei Antonov	1.78 m (5 ft 10 in)	85 kg (187 lb)	27 April 1985 (aged 36)	(Belarus) Yunost Minsk
88	F	German Nesterov	1.90 m (6 ft 3 in)	95 kg (209 lb)	31 August 1991 (aged 29)	(Belarus) HK Gomel
89	D	Dmitry Korobov	1.89 m (6 ft 2 in)	108 kg (238 lb)	12 March 1989 (aged 32)	(Russia) Salavat Yulaev Ufa
90	F	Danila Klimovich	1.85 m (6 ft 1 in)	85 kg (187 lb)	9 January 2003 (aged 18)	(Belarus) Minskie Zubry
92	F	Shane Prince	1.80 m (5 ft 11 in)	85 kg (187 lb)	16 November 1992 (aged 28)	(Russia) Avtomobilist Yekaterinburg
93	F	Andrei Belevich	1.85 m (6 ft 1 in)	95 kg (209 lb)	27 August 1997 (aged 23)	(Belarus) Dinamo Minsk
94	D	Vladislav Yeryomenko	1.84 m (6 ft 0 in)	90 kg (200 lb)	23 April 1999 (aged 22)	(Belarus) Dinamo Minsk

=== Czech Republic ===
A 29-player roster was announced on 7 May 2021.

Head coach: Filip Pešán

No.	Pos.	Name	Height	Weight	Birthdate	Team
3	D	Libor Hájek	1.86 m (6 ft 1 in)	84 kg (185 lb)	4 February 1998 (aged 23)	(United States) New York Rangers
6	D	David Musil	1.92 m (6 ft 4 in)	92 kg (203 lb)	9 April 1993 (aged 28)	(Czech Republic) Oceláři Třinec
9	D	David Sklenička	1.80 m (5 ft 11 in)	82 kg (181 lb)	8 September 1996 (aged 24)	(Finland) Jokerit
11	F	Filip Zadina	1.84 m (6 ft 0 in)	86 kg (190 lb)	27 November 1999 (aged 21)	(United States) Detroit Red Wings
13	F	Jakub Vrána	1.83 m (6 ft 0 in)	80 kg (180 lb)	28 February 1996 (aged 25)	(United States) Detroit Red Wings
14	F	Adam Musil	1.91 m (6 ft 3 in)	92 kg (203 lb)	26 March 1997 (aged 24)	(Czech Republic) Bílí Tygři Liberec
17	D	Filip Hronek – A	1.82 m (6 ft 0 in)	75 kg (165 lb)	2 November 1997 (aged 23)	(United States) Detroit Red Wings
18	F	Dominik Kubalík	1.87 m (6 ft 2 in)	86 kg (190 lb)	21 August 1995 (aged 25)	(United States) Chicago Blackhawks
19	F	Jakub Flek	1.72 m (5 ft 8 in)	74 kg (163 lb)	24 December 1992 (aged 28)	(Czech Republic) Karlovy Vary
25	F	Radan Lenc	1.80 m (5 ft 11 in)	79 kg (174 lb)	30 July 1991 (aged 29)	(Czech Republic) Bílí Tygři Liberec
30	G	Šimon Hrubec	1.86 m (6 ft 1 in)	83 kg (183 lb)	30 June 1991 (aged 29)	(Russia) Avangard Omsk
31	D	Lukáš Klok	1.85 m (6 ft 1 in)	85 kg (187 lb)	7 June 1995 (aged 25)	(Finland) Lukko
35	G	Roman Will	1.80 m (5 ft 11 in)	85 kg (187 lb)	22 May 1992 (aged 28)	(Russia) Traktor Chelyabinsk
43	F	Jan Kovář – C	1.81 m (5 ft 11 in)	98 kg (216 lb)	20 March 1990 (aged 31)	(Switzerland) EV Zug
44	F	Matěj Stránský	1.91 m (6 ft 3 in)	93 kg (205 lb)	11 July 1993 (aged 27)	(Czech Republic) Oceláři Třinec
52	F	Michael Špaček	1.80 m (5 ft 11 in)	85 kg (187 lb)	9 April 1997 (aged 24)	(Czech Republic) Oceláři Třinec
60	D	Michal Moravčík	1.94 m (6 ft 4 in)	96 kg (212 lb)	7 December 1994 (aged 26)	(Finland) Tappara
61	G	Petr Kváča	1.86 m (6 ft 1 in)	79 kg (174 lb)	12 September 1997 (aged 23)	(Czech Republic) Bílí Tygři Liberec
62	D	Andrej Šustr	1.99 m (6 ft 6 in)	84 kg (185 lb)	29 November 1990 (aged 30)	(China) Kunlun Red Star
67	F	Jiří Smejkal	1.89 m (6 ft 2 in)	83 kg (183 lb)	5 November 1996 (aged 24)	(Finland) Tappara
69	F	Lukáš Radil	1.91 m (6 ft 3 in)	91 kg (201 lb)	5 August 1990 (aged 30)	(Russia) Spartak Moscow
72	F	Filip Chytil	1.84 m (6 ft 0 in)	81 kg (179 lb)	5 September 1999 (aged 21)	(United States) New York Rangers
74	D	Ondřej Vitásek	1.93 m (6 ft 4 in)	103 kg (227 lb)	4 September 1990 (aged 30)	(Czech Republic) Bílí Tygři Liberec
78	F	Robin Hanzl	1.84 m (6 ft 0 in)	78 kg (172 lb)	10 January 1989 (aged 32)	(Russia) Spartak Moscow
79	F	Tomáš Zohorna – A	1.85 m (6 ft 1 in)	95 kg (209 lb)	3 January 1988 (aged 33)	(Czech Republic) Dynamo Pardubice
88	D	Libor Šulák	1.89 m (6 ft 2 in)	86 kg (190 lb)	4 March 1994 (aged 27)	(Finland) Oulun Kärpät
92	F	Jiří Sekáč	1.87 m (6 ft 2 in)	84 kg (185 lb)	10 June 1992 (aged 28)	(Russia) Avangard Omsk
95	F	Matěj Blümel	1.80 m (5 ft 11 in)	81 kg (179 lb)	31 May 2000 (aged 20)	(Czech Republic) Dynamo Pardubice

=== Denmark ===
The roster was announced on 7 May 2021.

Head coach: Heinz Ehlers

No.	Pos.	Name	Height	Weight	Birthdate	Team
1	G	Frederik Dichow	1.95 m (6 ft 5 in)	87 kg (192 lb)	1 March 2001 (aged 20)	(Denmark) Odense Bulldogs
2	D	Phillip Bruggisser	1.83 m (6 ft 0 in)	85 kg (187 lb)	7 August 1991 (aged 29)	(Germany) Grizzlys Wolfsburg
8	D	Anders Krogsgaard	1.85 m (6 ft 1 in)	82 kg (181 lb)	19 April 1996 (aged 25)	(Germany) Fischtown Pinguins
9	F	Frederik Storm	1.80 m (5 ft 11 in)	86 kg (190 lb)	20 February 1989 (aged 32)	(Germany) ERC Ingolstadt
10	F	Niklas Andersen	1.80 m (5 ft 11 in)	86 kg (190 lb)	20 November 1997 (aged 23)	(Germany) Fischtown Pinguins
11	F	Alexander True	1.96 m (6 ft 5 in)	91 kg (201 lb)	17 July 1997 (aged 23)	(United States) San Jose Barracuda
15	D	Matias Lassen	1.82 m (6 ft 0 in)	82 kg (181 lb)	15 March 1996 (aged 25)	(Sweden) Malmö Redhawks
16	F	Matthias Asperup	1.82 m (6 ft 0 in)	84 kg (185 lb)	3 March 1995 (aged 26)	(Denmark) Herlev Eagles
17	F	Nicklas Jensen	1.91 m (6 ft 3 in)	98 kg (216 lb)	6 March 1993 (aged 28)	(Finland) Jokerit
22	D	Markus Lauridsen	1.86 m (6 ft 1 in)	87 kg (192 lb)	28 February 1991 (aged 30)	(Sweden) Malmö Redhawks
25	D	Oliver Lauridsen – A	1.97 m (6 ft 6 in)	93 kg (205 lb)	24 March 1989 (aged 32)	(Sweden) Malmö Redhawks
28	D	Emil Kristensen	1.84 m (6 ft 0 in)	81 kg (179 lb)	20 September 1992 (aged 28)	(Germany) Schwenninger Wild Wings
29	F	Morten Madsen	1.90 m (6 ft 3 in)	95 kg (209 lb)	16 January 1987 (aged 34)	(Sweden) Timrå IK
32	G	Sebastian Dahm	1.82 m (6 ft 0 in)	83 kg (183 lb)	28 February 1987 (aged 34)	(Austria) EC KAC
30	G	Mads Søgaard	2.00 m (6 ft 7 in)	91 kg (201 lb)	13 December 2000 (aged 20)	(Denmark) Esbjerg Energy
33	F	Julian Jakobsen	1.84 m (6 ft 0 in)	87 kg (192 lb)	11 April 1987 (aged 34)	(Denmark) Aalborg Pirates
38	F	Morten Poulsen – A	1.86 m (6 ft 1 in)	95 kg (209 lb)	9 September 1988 (aged 32)	(Denmark) Herning Blue Fox
40	F	Jesper Jensen	1.83 m (6 ft 0 in)	80 kg (180 lb)	5 February 1987 (aged 34)	(Denmark) Frederikshavn White Hawks
41	D	Jesper B. Jensen – C	1.83 m (6 ft 0 in)	93 kg (205 lb)	30 July 1991 (aged 29)	(Sweden) Malmö Redhawks
43	F	Nichlas Hardt	1.77 m (5 ft 10 in)	80 kg (180 lb)	6 July 1988 (aged 32)	(Denmark) Rungsted Seier Capital
47	D	Oliver Larsen	1.85 m (6 ft 1 in)	94 kg (207 lb)	25 December 1998 (aged 22)	(Sweden) IK Oskarshamn
48	D	Nicholas Jensen	1.89 m (6 ft 2 in)	102 kg (225 lb)	8 April 1989 (aged 32)	(Germany) Düsseldorfer EG
50	F	Mathias Bau Hansen	2.00 m (6 ft 7 in)	108 kg (238 lb)	3 July 1993 (aged 27)	(Denmark) Herning Blue Fox
72	F	Nicolai Meyer	1.79 m (5 ft 10 in)	82 kg (181 lb)	21 July 1993 (aged 27)	(Finland) Ässät
75	F	Mathias From	1.86 m (6 ft 1 in)	85 kg (187 lb)	16 December 1997 (aged 23)	(Germany) Düsseldorfer EG
89	F	Mikkel Bødker	1.82 m (6 ft 0 in)	95 kg (209 lb)	16 December 1989 (aged 31)	(Switzerland) HC Lugano
95	F	Nick Olesen	1.85 m (6 ft 1 in)	84 kg (185 lb)	14 November 1995 (aged 25)	(Sweden) Södertälje SK

=== Great Britain ===
The roster was announced on 8 May 2021.

Head coach: Peter Russell

No.	Pos.	Name	Height	Weight	Birthdate	Team
1	G	Jackson Whistle	1.85 m (6 ft 1 in)	87 kg (192 lb)	9 June 1995 (aged 25)	(United Kingdom) Nottingham Panthers
2	D	Dallas Ehrhardt	1.93 m (6 ft 4 in)	102 kg (225 lb)	31 July 1992 (aged 28)	(United Kingdom) Manchester Storm
5	F	Ben Davies	1.72 m (5 ft 8 in)	75 kg (165 lb)	18 January 1991 (aged 30)	(United Kingdom) Manchester Storm
7	F	Robert Lachowicz	1.89 m (6 ft 2 in)	93 kg (205 lb)	8 February 1990 (aged 31)	(United Kingdom) Nottingham Panthers
8	F	Matthew Myers	1.89 m (6 ft 2 in)	93 kg (205 lb)	6 November 1984 (aged 36)	(United Kingdom) Sheffield Steelers
9	F	Brett Perlini	1.88 m (6 ft 2 in)	91 kg (201 lb)	14 June 1990 (aged 30)	(United Kingdom) Nottingham Panthers
11	D	Mark Garside	1.75 m (5 ft 9 in)	84 kg (185 lb)	21 March 1989 (aged 32)	(United Kingdom) Nottingham Panthers
13	D	David Phillips	1.91 m (6 ft 3 in)	85 kg (187 lb)	14 August 1987 (aged 33)	(United Kingdom) Sheffield Steelers
14	F	Liam Kirk	1.82 m (6 ft 0 in)	72 kg (159 lb)	3 January 2000 (aged 21)	(United Kingdom) Sheffield Steelers
16	F	Sam Duggan	1.87 m (6 ft 2 in)	90 kg (200 lb)	13 July 1998 (aged 22)	(United Kingdom) Coventry Blaze
17	D	Mark Richardson – A	1.83 m (6 ft 0 in)	88 kg (194 lb)	3 October 1986 (aged 34)	(Germany) Rote Teufel Bad Nauheim
18	F	Lewis Hook	1.83 m (6 ft 0 in)	82 kg (181 lb)	18 August 1996 (aged 24)	(United Kingdom) Nottingham Panthers
19	F	Luke Ferrara	1.80 m (5 ft 11 in)	89 kg (196 lb)	7 June 1993 (aged 27)	(United Kingdom) Coventry Blaze
20	F	Jonathan Phillips – C	1.75 m (5 ft 9 in)	81 kg (179 lb)	14 July 1982 (aged 38)	(United Kingdom) Sheffield Steelers
21	F	Mike Hammond	1.78 m (5 ft 10 in)	82 kg (181 lb)	21 February 1990 (aged 31)	(United Kingdom) Coventry Blaze
23	D	Paul Swindlehurst	1.93 m (6 ft 4 in)	90 kg (200 lb)	25 March 1993 (aged 28)	(United Kingdom) Coventry Blaze
24	D	Josh Tetlow	1.98 m (6 ft 6 in)	103 kg (227 lb)	12 January 1998 (aged 23)	(United Kingdom) Nottingham Panthers
28	D	Ben O'Connor	1.85 m (6 ft 1 in)	85 kg (187 lb)	21 December 1988 (aged 32)	(United Kingdom) Sheffield Steelers
33	G	Ben Bowns	1.83 m (6 ft 0 in)	81 kg (179 lb)	21 January 1991 (aged 30)	(United Kingdom) Nottingham Panthers
34	G	Jordan Hedley	1.91 m (6 ft 3 in)	88 kg (194 lb)	7 August 1996 (aged 24)	(United Kingdom) Coventry Blaze
44	D	Sam Jones	1.88 m (6 ft 2 in)	86 kg (190 lb)	11 November 1997 (aged 23)	(United Kingdom) Sheffield Steelers
58	D	David Clements	1.85 m (6 ft 1 in)	84 kg (185 lb)	20 September 1994 (aged 26)	(United Kingdom) Coventry Blaze
59	F	Ross Venus	1.83 m (6 ft 0 in)	75 kg (165 lb)	28 April 1994 (aged 27)	(United Kingdom) Coventry Blaze
63	F	Brendan Connolly	1.73 m (5 ft 8 in)	82 kg (181 lb)	15 September 1985 (aged 35)	(United Kingdom) Sheffield Steelers
74	F	Ollie Betteridge	1.80 m (5 ft 11 in)	80 kg (180 lb)	16 January 1996 (aged 25)	(United Kingdom) Nottingham Panthers
75	F	Robert Dowd – A	1.78 m (5 ft 10 in)	80 kg (180 lb)	26 May 1988 (aged 32)	(United Kingdom) Sheffield Steelers
89	F	Ciaran Long	1.90 m (6 ft 3 in)	81 kg (179 lb)	9 February 1991 (aged 30)	(United Kingdom) Manchester Storm
91	F	Ben Lake	1.80 m (5 ft 11 in)	77 kg (170 lb)	31 May 1990 (aged 30)	(United Kingdom) Manchester Storm

=== ROC ===
The roster was announced on 15 May 2021.

Head coach: Valeri Bragin

No.	Pos.	Name	Height	Weight	Birthdate	Team
2	D	Artyom Zub	1.88 m (6 ft 2 in)	90 kg (200 lb)	3 October 1995 (aged 25)	(Canada) Ottawa Senators
4	D	Vladislav Gavrikov – A	1.90 m (6 ft 3 in)	97 kg (214 lb)	21 November 1995 (aged 25)	(United States) Columbus Blue Jackets
7	D	Dmitry Orlov	1.82 m (6 ft 0 in)	92 kg (203 lb)	23 July 1991 (aged 29)	(United States) Washington Capitals
8	F	Ivan Morozov	1.86 m (6 ft 1 in)	89 kg (196 lb)	5 May 2000 (aged 21)	(Russia) SKA Saint Petersburg
9	D	Ivan Provorov	1.86 m (6 ft 1 in)	91 kg (201 lb)	13 January 1997 (aged 24)	(United States) Philadelphia Flyers
10	F	Sergey Tolchinsky	1.73 m (5 ft 8 in)	72 kg (159 lb)	3 February 1995 (aged 26)	(Russia) Avangard Omsk
11	F	Dmitri Voronkov	1.92 m (6 ft 4 in)	86 kg (190 lb)	10 September 2000 (aged 20)	(Russia) Ak Bars Kazan
15	F	Pavel Karnaukhov	1.90 m (6 ft 3 in)	95 kg (209 lb)	15 March 1997 (aged 24)	(Russia) CSKA Moscow
16	D	Nikita Zadorov	1.96 m (6 ft 5 in)	104 kg (229 lb)	16 April 1995 (aged 26)	(United States) Chicago Blackhawks
21	F	Konstantin Okulov	1.84 m (6 ft 0 in)	82 kg (181 lb)	18 February 1995 (aged 26)	(Russia) CSKA Moscow
25	F	Mikhail Grigorenko	1.89 m (6 ft 2 in)	95 kg (209 lb)	16 May 1994 (aged 27)	(United States) Columbus Blue Jackets
27	D	Igor Ozhiganov	1.88 m (6 ft 2 in)	94 kg (207 lb)	13 October 1992 (aged 28)	(Russia) SKA Saint Petersburg
31	G	Alexander Samonov	1.82 m (6 ft 0 in)	76 kg (168 lb)	23 August 1995 (aged 25)	(Russia) SKA Saint Petersburg
32	G	Sergei Bobrovsky	1.88 m (6 ft 2 in)	86 kg (190 lb)	20 September 1988 (aged 32)	(United States) Florida Panthers
37	F	Evgeny Timkin	1.95 m (6 ft 5 in)	99 kg (218 lb)	3 September 1990 (aged 30)	(Russia) SKA Saint Petersburg
57	F	Artyom Shvets-Rogovoy	1.87 m (6 ft 2 in)	84 kg (185 lb)	3 March 1995 (aged 26)	(Russia) SKA Saint Petersburg
58	F	Anton Slepyshev – C	1.85 m (6 ft 1 in)	98 kg (216 lb)	13 May 1994 (aged 27)	(Russia) CSKA Moscow
60	G	Ivan Bocharov	1.87 m (6 ft 2 in)	76 kg (168 lb)	18 May 1995 (aged 26)	(Russia) Dynamo Moscow
71	F	Anton Burdasov – A	1.88 m (6 ft 2 in)	97 kg (214 lb)	9 May 1991 (aged 30)	(Russia) SKA Saint Petersburg
72	F	Emil Galimov	1.87 m (6 ft 2 in)	84 kg (185 lb)	9 May 1992 (aged 29)	(Russia) SKA Saint Petersburg
78	F	Maxim Shalunov	1.93 m (6 ft 4 in)	90 kg (200 lb)	31 January 1993 (aged 28)	(Russia) CSKA Moscow
81	F	Vladislav Kamenev	1.89 m (6 ft 2 in)	88 kg (194 lb)	12 August 1996 (aged 24)	(Russia) SKA Saint Petersburg
87	D	Rushan Rafikov	1.89 m (6 ft 2 in)	91 kg (201 lb)	15 May 1995 (aged 26)	(Russia) Lokomotiv Yaroslavl
89	D	Nikita Nesterov	1.80 m (5 ft 11 in)	83 kg (183 lb)	28 March 1993 (aged 28)	(Canada) Calgary Flames
91	F	Vladimir Tarasenko	1.82 m (6 ft 0 in)	95 kg (209 lb)	13 December 1991 (aged 29)	(United States) St. Louis Blues
94	F	Alexander Barabanov	1.79 m (5 ft 10 in)	89 kg (196 lb)	17 June 1994 (aged 26)	(United States) San Jose Sharks
96	F	Andrei Kuzmenko	1.81 m (5 ft 11 in)	88 kg (194 lb)	4 February 1996 (aged 25)	(Russia) SKA Saint Petersburg
98	D	Grigori Dronov	1.90 m (6 ft 3 in)	91 kg (201 lb)	10 January 1998 (aged 23)	(Russia) Metallurg Magnitogorsk

=== Slovakia ===
The roster was announced on 15 May 2021.

Head coach: Craig Ramsay

No.	Pos.	Name	Height	Weight	Birthdate	Team
3	D	Adam Jánošík	1.80 m (5 ft 11 in)	85 kg (187 lb)	7 September 1992 (aged 28)	(Sweden) IK Oskarshamn
5	D	Šimon Nemec	1.83 m (6 ft 0 in)	85 kg (187 lb)	15 February 2004 (aged 17)	(Slovakia) HK Nitra
7	D	Mário Grman	1.85 m (6 ft 1 in)	92 kg (203 lb)	11 April 1997 (aged 24)	(Finland) SaiPa
8	F	Pavol Skalický	1.95 m (6 ft 5 in)	97 kg (214 lb)	9 October 1995 (aged 25)	(Finland) Lukko
12	F	Miloš Kelemen	1.88 m (6 ft 2 in)	96 kg (212 lb)	6 July 1999 (aged 21)	(Slovakia) HKM Zvolen
13	F	Michal Krištof – A	1.75 m (5 ft 9 in)	74 kg (163 lb)	11 October 1993 (aged 27)	(Finland) Oulun Kärpät
16	F	Róbert Lantoši	1.80 m (5 ft 11 in)	84 kg (185 lb)	24 September 1995 (aged 25)	(United States) Providence Bruins
17	F	Dávid Buc	1.87 m (6 ft 2 in)	96 kg (212 lb)	22 January 1987 (aged 34)	(Slovakia) Bratislava Capitals
19	F	Matúš Sukeľ	1.76 m (5 ft 9 in)	77 kg (170 lb)	23 January 1996 (aged 25)	(Czech Republic) Sparta Prague
22	D	Samuel Kňažko	1.86 m (6 ft 1 in)	87 kg (192 lb)	7 August 2002 (aged 18)	(Finland) HC TPS
23	F	Adam Liška	1.80 m (5 ft 11 in)	84 kg (185 lb)	14 October 1999 (aged 21)	(Russia) Severstal Cherepovets
27	F	Marek Hrivík – A	1.85 m (6 ft 1 in)	93 kg (205 lb)	28 August 1991 (aged 29)	(Sweden) Leksands IF
28	D	Martin Gernát	1.93 m (6 ft 4 in)	94 kg (207 lb)	11 April 1993 (aged 28)	(Czech Republic) Oceláři Třinec
29	D	Michal Ivan	1.85 m (6 ft 1 in)	85 kg (187 lb)	18 November 1999 (aged 21)	(Slovakia) HKM Zvolen
33	G	Július Hudáček	1.83 m (6 ft 0 in)	87 kg (192 lb)	9 August 1988 (aged 32)	(Russia) Spartak Moscow
34	F	Peter Cehlárik	1.88 m (6 ft 2 in)	93 kg (205 lb)	2 August 1995 (aged 25)	(Sweden) Leksands IF
35	G	Adam Húska	1.94 m (6 ft 4 in)	93 kg (205 lb)	12 May 1997 (aged 24)	(United States) Hartford Wolf Pack
40	F	Miloš Roman	1.81 m (5 ft 11 in)	87 kg (192 lb)	6 November 1999 (aged 21)	(Czech Republic) Oceláři Třinec
42	G	Branislav Konrád	1.88 m (6 ft 2 in)	88 kg (194 lb)	10 October 1987 (aged 33)	(Czech Republic) HC Olomouc
44	D	Mislav Rosandić	1.81 m (5 ft 11 in)	85 kg (187 lb)	26 January 1995 (aged 26)	(Czech Republic) Bílí Tygři Liberec
48	D	Daniel Gachulinec	1.80 m (5 ft 11 in)	83 kg (183 lb)	16 February 1994 (aged 27)	(Slovakia) HC 07 Detva
60	F	Juraj Slafkovský	1.92 m (6 ft 4 in)	99 kg (218 lb)	30 March 2004 (aged 17)	(Finland) HC TPS
65	D	Martin Bučko	1.89 m (6 ft 2 in)	86 kg (190 lb)	13 May 2000 (aged 21)	(Czech Republic) Dynamo Pardubice
67	F	Marián Studenič	1.84 m (6 ft 0 in)	83 kg (183 lb)	28 October 1998 (aged 22)	(United States) New Jersey Devils
71	D	Marek Ďaloga – C	1.93 m (6 ft 4 in)	90 kg (200 lb)	10 March 1989 (aged 32)	(Czech Republic) Dynamo Pardubice
77	F	Martin Faško-Rudáš	1.85 m (6 ft 1 in)	77 kg (170 lb)	10 August 2000 (aged 20)	(Slovakia) Banská Bystrica
88	F	Kristián Pospíšil	1.87 m (6 ft 2 in)	88 kg (194 lb)	22 April 1996 (aged 25)	(Finland) Lukko
89	F	Adrián Holešinský	1.82 m (6 ft 0 in)	85 kg (187 lb)	11 February 1996 (aged 25)	(Slovakia) HK Nitra

=== Sweden ===
The roster was announced on 16 May 2021.

Head coach: Johan Garpenlöv

No.	Pos.	Name	Height	Weight	Birthdate	Team
3	D	Klas Dahlbeck – A	1.89 m (6 ft 2 in)	94 kg (207 lb)	6 July 1991 (aged 29)	(Russia) CSKA Moscow
7	D	Henrik Tömmernes – C	1.86 m (6 ft 1 in)	84 kg (185 lb)	28 August 1990 (aged 30)	(Switzerland) Genève-Servette
9	F	Adrian Kempe	1.87 m (6 ft 2 in)	85 kg (187 lb)	13 September 1996 (aged 24)	(United States) Los Angeles Kings
12	F	Max Friberg	1.79 m (5 ft 10 in)	91 kg (201 lb)	20 November 1992 (aged 28)	(Sweden) Frölunda HC
15	F	Pontus Holmberg	1.80 m (5 ft 11 in)	81 kg (179 lb)	9 March 1999 (aged 22)	(Sweden) Växjö Lakers
17	F	Pär Lindholm	1.90 m (6 ft 3 in)	90 kg (200 lb)	5 October 1991 (aged 29)	(Sweden) Skellefteå AIK
19	F	Marcus Sörensen	1.81 m (5 ft 11 in)	79 kg (174 lb)	7 April 1992 (aged 29)	(United States) San Jose Sharks
20	D	Lawrence Pilut	1.80 m (5 ft 11 in)	84 kg (185 lb)	30 December 1995 (aged 25)	(Russia) Traktor Chelyabinsk
23	D	Jesper Sellgren	1.80 m (5 ft 11 in)	77 kg (170 lb)	11 June 1998 (aged 22)	(Sweden) Frölunda HC
24	F	Oscar Lindberg	1.885 m (6 ft 2.2 in)	88 kg (194 lb)	29 October 1991 (aged 29)	(Russia) Dynamo Moscow
27	D	Nils Lundkvist	1.80 m (5 ft 11 in)	79 kg (174 lb)	27 July 2000 (aged 20)	(Sweden) Luleå HF
28	F	Jesper Frödén	1.79 m (5 ft 10 in)	80 kg (180 lb)	21 September 1994 (aged 26)	(Sweden) Skellefteå AIK
29	F	Mario Kempe	1.83 m (6 ft 0 in)	84 kg (185 lb)	19 September 1988 (aged 32)	(Russia) CSKA Moscow
30	G	Viktor Fasth	1.83 m (6 ft 0 in)	87 kg (192 lb)	8 August 1982 (aged 38)	(Sweden) Växjö Lakers
32	D	Magnus Nygren	1.85 m (6 ft 1 in)	87 kg (192 lb)	7 June 1990 (aged 30)	(Switzerland) HC Davos
33	G	Samuel Ersson	1.88 m (6 ft 2 in)	80 kg (180 lb)	20 October 1999 (aged 21)	(Sweden) Brynäs IF
34	D	Albert Johansson	1.83 m (6 ft 0 in)	76 kg (168 lb)	4 January 2001 (aged 20)	(Sweden) Färjestad BK
37	F	Isac Lundeström	1.84 m (6 ft 0 in)	85 kg (187 lb)	6 November 1999 (aged 21)	(United States) Anaheim Ducks
39	G	Adam Reideborn	1.84 m (6 ft 0 in)	81 kg (179 lb)	18 January 1992 (aged 29)	(Russia) Ak Bars Kazan
40	F	Andreas Wingerli	1.73 m (5 ft 8 in)	77 kg (170 lb)	11 September 1997 (aged 23)	(Sweden) Skellefteå AIK
48	F	Carl Klingberg	1.90 m (6 ft 3 in)	98 kg (216 lb)	28 January 1991 (aged 30)	(Switzerland) EV Zug
50	D	Viktor Lööv	1.91 m (6 ft 3 in)	98 kg (216 lb)	16 November 1992 (aged 28)	(Finland) Jokerit
51	F	Filip Hållander	1.85 m (6 ft 1 in)	86 kg (190 lb)	29 June 2000 (aged 20)	(Sweden) Luleå HF
64	D	Jonathan Pudas	1.79 m (5 ft 10 in)	79 kg (174 lb)	26 April 1993 (aged 28)	(Finland) Jokerit
67	F	Rickard Rakell – A	1.86 m (6 ft 1 in)	92 kg (203 lb)	5 May 1993 (aged 28)	(United States) Anaheim Ducks
68	F	Victor Olofsson	1.78 m (5 ft 10 in)	80 kg (180 lb)	18 July 1995 (aged 25)	(United States) Buffalo Sabres
70	F	Dennis Rasmussen	1.91 m (6 ft 3 in)	91 kg (201 lb)	3 July 1990 (aged 30)	(Russia) Metallurg Magnitogorsk

=== Switzerland ===
The roster was announced on 16 May 2021.

Head coach: Patrick Fischer

No.	Pos.	Name	Height	Weight	Birthdate	Team
2	D	Santeri Alatalo	1.80 m (5 ft 11 in)	80 kg (180 lb)	9 May 1990 (aged 31)	(Switzerland) EV Zug
8	F	Vincent Praplan	1.83 m (6 ft 0 in)	87 kg (192 lb)	10 June 1994 (aged 26)	(Switzerland) SC Bern
10	F	Andres Ambühl – A	1.76 m (5 ft 9 in)	86 kg (190 lb)	14 September 1983 (aged 37)	(Switzerland) HC Davos
13	F	Nico Hischier – A	1.86 m (6 ft 1 in)	88 kg (194 lb)	4 January 1999 (aged 22)	(United States) New Jersey Devils
15	F	Grégory Hofmann	1.82 m (6 ft 0 in)	91 kg (201 lb)	13 November 1992 (aged 28)	(Switzerland) EV Zug
16	D	Raphael Diaz – C	1.81 m (5 ft 11 in)	89 kg (196 lb)	9 January 1986 (aged 35)	(Switzerland) EV Zug
20	G	Reto Berra	1.94 m (6 ft 4 in)	99 kg (218 lb)	3 January 1987 (aged 34)	(Switzerland) HC Fribourg-Gottéron
23	F	Philipp Kurashev	1.83 m (6 ft 0 in)	86 kg (190 lb)	12 October 1999 (aged 21)	(United States) Chicago Blackhawks
24	D	Tobias Geisser	1.93 m (6 ft 4 in)	91 kg (201 lb)	13 February 1999 (aged 22)	(Switzerland) EV Zug
25	D	Mirco Müller	1.91 m (6 ft 3 in)	95 kg (209 lb)	21 March 1995 (aged 26)	(Sweden) Leksands IF
28	F	Timo Meier	1.86 m (6 ft 1 in)	98 kg (216 lb)	8 October 1996 (aged 24)	(United States) San Jose Sharks
38	D	Lukas Frick	1.88 m (6 ft 2 in)	90 kg (200 lb)	15 September 1994 (aged 26)	(Switzerland) HC Lausanne
50	G	Melvin Nyffeler	1.78 m (5 ft 10 in)	84 kg (185 lb)	16 December 1994 (aged 26)	(Switzerland) SC Rapperswil-Jona Lakers
55	D	Romain Loeffel	1.78 m (5 ft 10 in)	85 kg (187 lb)	10 March 1991 (aged 30)	(Switzerland) HC Lugano
59	F	Dario Simion	1.90 m (6 ft 3 in)	87 kg (192 lb)	22 May 1994 (aged 26)	(Switzerland) EV Zug
60	F	Tristan Scherwey	1.76 m (5 ft 9 in)	85 kg (187 lb)	7 May 1991 (aged 30)	(Switzerland) SC Bern
61	F	Fabrice Herzog	1.89 m (6 ft 2 in)	89 kg (196 lb)	9 December 1994 (aged 26)	(Switzerland) HC Davos
63	G	Leonardo Genoni	1.82 m (6 ft 0 in)	87 kg (192 lb)	28 August 1987 (aged 33)	(Switzerland) EV Zug
65	D	Ramon Untersander	1.84 m (6 ft 0 in)	87 kg (192 lb)	21 January 1991 (aged 30)	(Switzerland) SC Bern
71	F	Enzo Corvi	1.83 m (6 ft 0 in)	86 kg (190 lb)	23 December 1992 (aged 28)	(Switzerland) HC Davos
83	F	Joël Vermin	1.80 m (5 ft 11 in)	87 kg (192 lb)	5 February 1992 (aged 29)	(Switzerland) Genève-Servette HC
85	F	Sven Andrighetto	1.78 m (5 ft 10 in)	85 kg (187 lb)	21 March 1993 (aged 28)	(Switzerland) ZSC Lions
86	D	Janis Moser	1.85 m (6 ft 1 in)	78 kg (172 lb)	6 June 2000 (aged 20)	(Switzerland) EHC Biel
88	F	Christoph Bertschy	1.78 m (5 ft 10 in)	84 kg (185 lb)	5 April 1994 (aged 27)	(Switzerland) Lausanne HC
89	D	Fabian Heldner	1.93 m (6 ft 4 in)	95 kg (209 lb)	24 June 1996 (aged 24)	(Switzerland) Lausanne HC
96	F	Noah Rod	1.84 m (6 ft 0 in)	88 kg (194 lb)	7 June 1996 (aged 24)	(Switzerland) Genève-Servette HC
97	D	Jonas Siegenthaler	1.88 m (6 ft 2 in)	99 kg (218 lb)	6 May 1997 (aged 24)	(United States) New Jersey Devils

== Group B ==
=== Canada ===
The roster was announced on 14 May 2021.

Head coach: Gerard Gallant

No.	Pos.	Name	Height	Weight	Birthdate	Team
2	D	Braden Schneider	1.88 m (6 ft 2 in)	95 kg (209 lb)	20 September 2001 (aged 19)	(Canada) Brandon Wheat Kings
5	D	Jacob Bernard-Docker	1.85 m (6 ft 1 in)	88 kg (194 lb)	30 June 2000 (aged 20)	(Canada) Ottawa Senators
6	D	Colin Miller – A	1.85 m (6 ft 1 in)	90 kg (200 lb)	29 October 1992 (aged 28)	(United States) Buffalo Sabres
8	F	Liam Foudy	1.88 m (6 ft 2 in)	83 kg (183 lb)	4 February 2000 (aged 21)	(United States) Columbus Blue Jackets
11	F	Jaret Anderson-Dolan	1.80 m (5 ft 11 in)	89 kg (196 lb)	12 September 1999 (aged 21)	(United States) Los Angeles Kings
13	F	Gabriel Vilardi	1.91 m (6 ft 3 in)	91 kg (201 lb)	16 August 1999 (aged 21)	(United States) Los Angeles Kings
14	F	Adam Henrique – C	1.82 m (6 ft 0 in)	88 kg (194 lb)	6 February 1990 (aged 31)	(United States) Anaheim Ducks
17	F	Justin Danforth	1.75 m (5 ft 9 in)	82 kg (181 lb)	15 March 1993 (aged 28)	(Russia) HC Vityaz
21	F	Nick Paul	1.93 m (6 ft 4 in)	102 kg (225 lb)	20 March 1995 (aged 26)	(Canada) Ottawa Senators
22	F	Brandon Hagel	1.80 m (5 ft 11 in)	79 kg (174 lb)	27 August 1998 (aged 22)	(United States) Chicago Blackhawks
25	D	Owen Power	1.98 m (6 ft 6 in)	96 kg (212 lb)	22 November 2002 (aged 18)	(United States) Univ. of Michigan
26	D	Sean Walker	1.80 m (5 ft 11 in)	89 kg (196 lb)	13 November 1994 (aged 26)	(United States) Los Angeles Kings
27	F	Michael Bunting	1.83 m (6 ft 0 in)	85 kg (187 lb)	17 September 1995 (aged 25)	(United States) Arizona Coyotes
28	F	Connor Brown – A	1.83 m (6 ft 0 in)	84 kg (185 lb)	14 January 1994 (aged 27)	(Canada) Ottawa Senators
33	G	Adin Hill	1.96 m (6 ft 5 in)	99 kg (218 lb)	11 May 1996 (aged 25)	(United States) Arizona Coyotes
35	G	Darcy Kuemper	1.95 m (6 ft 5 in)	97 kg (214 lb)	5 May 1990 (aged 31)	(United States) Arizona Coyotes
38	D	Mario Ferraro	1.80 m (5 ft 11 in)	84 kg (185 lb)	17 September 1998 (aged 22)	(United States) San Jose Sharks
44	F	Max Comtois	1.90 m (6 ft 3 in)	97 kg (214 lb)	8 January 1999 (aged 22)	(United States) Anaheim Ducks
65	G	Michael DiPietro	1.83 m (6 ft 0 in)	93 kg (205 lb)	9 June 1999 (aged 21)	(Canada) Vancouver Canucks
70	D	Troy Stecher	1.78 m (5 ft 10 in)	84 kg (185 lb)	7 April 1994 (aged 27)	(United States) Detroit Red Wings
73	F	Brandon Pirri	1.85 m (6 ft 1 in)	82 kg (181 lb)	10 April 1991 (aged 30)	(United States) Chicago Blackhawks
74	D	Nicolas Beaudin	1.80 m (5 ft 11 in)	76 kg (168 lb)	7 October 1999 (aged 21)	(United States) Chicago Blackhawks
88	F	Andrew Mangiapane	1.78 m (5 ft 10 in)	83 kg (183 lb)	4 April 1996 (aged 25)	(Canada) Calgary Flames
91	F	Cole Perfetti	1.80 m (5 ft 11 in)	80 kg (180 lb)	1 January 2002 (aged 19)	(Canada) Manitoba Moose

=== Finland ===
The roster was announced on 15 May 2021.

Head coach: Jukka Jalonen

No.	Pos.	Name	Height	Weight	Birthdate	Team
2	D	Ville Pokka	1.83 m (6 ft 0 in)	90 kg (200 lb)	3 June 1994 (aged 26)	(Russia) Avangard Omsk
3	D	Olli Määttä	1.87 m (6 ft 2 in)	89 kg (196 lb)	22 August 1994 (aged 26)	(United States) Los Angeles Kings
6	D	Tony Sund	1.92 m (6 ft 4 in)	93 kg (205 lb)	4 August 1995 (aged 25)	(Switzerland) HC Davos
7	D	Oliwer Kaski	1.90 m (6 ft 3 in)	89 kg (196 lb)	4 September 1995 (aged 25)	(Russia) Avangard Omsk
12	F	Marko Anttila – C	2.03 m (6 ft 8 in)	108 kg (238 lb)	27 May 1985 (aged 35)	(Finland) Jokerit
13	F	Mikael Ruohomaa	1.84 m (6 ft 0 in)	84 kg (185 lb)	17 November 1988 (aged 32)	(Russia) Sibir Novosibirsk
15	F	Anton Lundell	1.85 m (6 ft 1 in)	86 kg (190 lb)	3 October 2001 (aged 19)	(Finland) HIFK
20	F	Niko Ojamäki	1.81 m (5 ft 11 in)	84 kg (185 lb)	17 June 1995 (aged 25)	(Sweden) Linköping HC
21	F	Jere Innala	1.75 m (5 ft 9 in)	83 kg (183 lb)	17 March 1998 (aged 23)	(Finland) HPK
22	F	Arttu Ruotsalainen	1.74 m (5 ft 9 in)	80 kg (180 lb)	29 October 1997 (aged 23)	(United States) Buffalo Sabres
24	F	Hannes Björninen	1.85 m (6 ft 1 in)	88 kg (194 lb)	19 October 1995 (aged 25)	(Finland) Lahti Pelicans
25	F	Jere Karjalainen	1.75 m (5 ft 9 in)	82 kg (181 lb)	23 May 1992 (aged 28)	(Russia) HC Sochi
27	F	Petri Kontiola – A	1.83 m (6 ft 0 in)	97 kg (214 lb)	4 October 1984 (aged 36)	(Finland) HPK
29	G	Harri Säteri	1.86 m (6 ft 1 in)	90 kg (200 lb)	29 December 1989 (aged 31)	(Russia) Sibir Novosibirsk
31	G	Janne Juvonen	1.84 m (6 ft 0 in)	84 kg (185 lb)	3 October 1994 (aged 26)	(Sweden) Leksands IF
38	F	Teemu Turunen	1.79 m (5 ft 10 in)	84 kg (185 lb)	24 November 1995 (aged 25)	(Switzerland) HC Davos
39	D	Kim Nousiainen	1.77 m (5 ft 10 in)	81 kg (179 lb)	14 November 2000 (aged 20)	(Finland) KalPa
40	D	Petteri Lindbohm	1.90 m (6 ft 3 in)	93 kg (205 lb)	23 September 1993 (aged 27)	(Switzerland) EHC Biel
45	G	Juho Olkinuora	1.88 m (6 ft 2 in)	91 kg (201 lb)	4 November 1990 (aged 30)	(Russia) Metallurg Magnitogorsk
47	F	Peter Tiivola	1.92 m (6 ft 4 in)	93 kg (205 lb)	5 September 1993 (aged 27)	(Finland) Ässät
48	F	Valtteri Puustinen	1.76 m (5 ft 9 in)	81 kg (179 lb)	4 June 1999 (aged 21)	(Finland) HPK
50	D	Miika Koivisto	1.84 m (6 ft 0 in)	88 kg (194 lb)	20 July 1990 (aged 30)	(Sweden) Växjö Lakers
52	D	Mikael Seppälä	1.88 m (6 ft 2 in)	91 kg (201 lb)	8 March 1994 (aged 27)	(Finland) KalPa
55	D	Atte Ohtamaa – A	1.88 m (6 ft 2 in)	92 kg (203 lb)	6 November 1987 (aged 33)	(Russia) Lokomotiv Yaroslavl
61	D	Axel Rindell	1.83 m (6 ft 0 in)	83 kg (183 lb)	23 April 2000 (aged 21)	(Finland) Mikkelin Jukurit
76	F	Jere Sallinen	1.88 m (6 ft 2 in)	91 kg (201 lb)	26 October 1990 (aged 30)	(Finland) HIFK
80	F	Saku Mäenalanen	1.92 m (6 ft 4 in)	94 kg (207 lb)	29 May 1994 (aged 26)	(Finland) Jokerit
81	F	Iiro Pakarinen	1.85 m (6 ft 1 in)	90 kg (200 lb)	25 August 1991 (aged 29)	(Finland) Jokerit

=== Germany ===
A 26-player roster was announced on 3 May 2021. It was 28 players on 10 May. On 15 May, the final squad was revealed.

Head coach: Toni Söderholm

No.	Pos.	Name	Height	Weight	Birthdate	Team
3	D	Dominik Bittner	1.81 m (5 ft 11 in)	76 kg (168 lb)	10 June 1992 (aged 28)	(Germany) Grizzlys Wolfsburg
5	D	Korbinian Holzer – A	1.90 m (6 ft 3 in)	94 kg (207 lb)	16 February 1988 (aged 33)	(Russia) Avtomobilist Yekaterinburg
7	F	Maximilian Kastner	1.80 m (5 ft 11 in)	84 kg (185 lb)	3 January 1993 (aged 28)	(Germany) EHC Red Bull München
8	F	Tobias Rieder	1.80 m (5 ft 11 in)	82 kg (181 lb)	10 January 1993 (aged 28)	(United States) Buffalo Sabres
9	D	Leon Gawanke	1.86 m (6 ft 1 in)	90 kg (200 lb)	31 May 1999 (aged 21)	(Canada) Manitoba Moose
11	D	Marco Nowak	1.89 m (6 ft 2 in)	93 kg (205 lb)	23 July 1990 (aged 30)	(Germany) Düsseldorfer EG
15	F	Stefan Loibl	1.86 m (6 ft 1 in)	83 kg (183 lb)	24 June 1996 (aged 24)	(Germany) Adler Mannheim
21	F	Nico Krämmer	1.86 m (6 ft 1 in)	94 kg (207 lb)	23 October 1992 (aged 28)	(Germany) Adler Mannheim
22	F	Matthias Plachta	1.88 m (6 ft 2 in)	100 kg (220 lb)	16 May 1991 (aged 30)	(Germany) Adler Mannheim
31	G	Niklas Treutle	1.87 m (6 ft 2 in)	85 kg (187 lb)	29 April 1991 (aged 30)	(Germany) Nürnberg Ice Tigers
34	F	Tom Kühnhackl	1.87 m (6 ft 2 in)	89 kg (196 lb)	21 January 1992 (aged 29)	(United States) Bridgeport Islanders
35	G	Mathias Niederberger	1.80 m (5 ft 11 in)	80 kg (180 lb)	26 November 1992 (aged 28)	(Germany) Eisbären Berlin
38	D	Fabio Wagner	1.82 m (6 ft 0 in)	83 kg (183 lb)	17 September 1995 (aged 25)	(Germany) ERC Ingolstadt
41	D	Jonas Müller	1.83 m (6 ft 0 in)	88 kg (194 lb)	19 November 1995 (aged 25)	(Germany) Eisbären Berlin
53	D	Moritz Seider	1.92 m (6 ft 4 in)	90 kg (200 lb)	6 April 2001 (aged 20)	(Sweden) Rögle BK
54	F	Lean Bergmann	1.87 m (6 ft 2 in)	93 kg (205 lb)	4 October 1998 (aged 22)	(United States) San Jose Sharks
58	F	Markus Eisenschmid	1.84 m (6 ft 0 in)	82 kg (181 lb)	22 January 1995 (aged 26)	(Germany) Adler Mannheim
70	F	John Peterka	1.80 m (5 ft 11 in)	85 kg (187 lb)	14 January 2002 (aged 19)	(Germany) EHC Red Bull München
72	F	Dominik Kahun	1.80 m (5 ft 11 in)	82 kg (181 lb)	2 July 1995 (aged 25)	(Canada) Edmonton Oilers
73	F	Lukas Reichel	1.83 m (6 ft 0 in)	78 kg (172 lb)	17 May 2002 (aged 19)	(Germany) Eisbären Berlin
77	F	Daniel Fischbuch	1.80 m (5 ft 11 in)	80 kg (180 lb)	19 August 1993 (aged 27)	(Germany) Düsseldorfer EG
83	F	Leonhard Pföderl	1.82 m (6 ft 0 in)	87 kg (192 lb)	1 September 1993 (aged 27)	(Germany) Eisbären Berlin
85	D	Marcel Brandt	1.76 m (5 ft 9 in)	80 kg (180 lb)	8 May 1992 (aged 29)	(Germany) Straubing Tigers
90	G	Felix Brückmann	1.81 m (5 ft 11 in)	83 kg (183 lb)	16 December 1990 (aged 30)	(Germany) Adler Mannheim
91	D	Moritz Müller – C	1.87 m (6 ft 2 in)	92 kg (203 lb)	19 November 1986 (aged 34)	(Germany) Kölner Haie
92	F	Marcel Noebels – A	1.92 m (6 ft 4 in)	92 kg (203 lb)	14 March 1992 (aged 29)	(Germany) Eisbären Berlin
95	F	Frederik Tiffels	1.85 m (6 ft 1 in)	91 kg (201 lb)	20 May 1995 (aged 26)	(Germany) Kölner Haie
96	F	Andreas Eder	1.89 m (6 ft 2 in)	91 kg (201 lb)	20 March 1996 (aged 25)	(Germany) Straubing Tigers

=== Italy ===
The roster was announced on 15 May 2021.

Head coach: Greg Ireland

No.	Pos.	Name	Height	Weight	Birthdate	Team
3	F	Markus Gander	1.88 m (6 ft 2 in)	90 kg (200 lb)	16 May 1989 (aged 32)	(Italy) Wipptal Broncos
10	F	Stefano Giliati	1.80 m (5 ft 11 in)	90 kg (200 lb)	7 October 1987 (aged 33)	(Italy) HC Bolzano
13	F	Peter Hochkofler	1.91 m (6 ft 3 in)	92 kg (203 lb)	4 October 1994 (aged 26)	(Austria) Red Bull Salzburg
14	F	Thomas Galimberti	1.85 m (6 ft 1 in)	80 kg (180 lb)	12 November 2003 (aged 17)	(Italy) Eppan Pirates
15	D	Enrico Miglioranzi	1.83 m (6 ft 0 in)	86 kg (190 lb)	8 October 1991 (aged 29)	(Italy) Asiago Hockey
17	D	Lorenzo Casetti	1.90 m (6 ft 3 in)	90 kg (200 lb)	14 September 1993 (aged 27)	(Italy) Asiago Hockey
19	F	Raphael Andergassen	1.78 m (5 ft 10 in)	79 kg (174 lb)	14 June 1993 (aged 27)	(Italy) Pustertal Wölfe
21	D	Daniel Glira	1.88 m (6 ft 2 in)	87 kg (192 lb)	25 March 1994 (aged 27)	(Italy) Pustertal Wölfe
22	F	Simon Pitschieler	1.80 m (5 ft 11 in)	81 kg (179 lb)	3 December 1997 (aged 23)	(Italy) HC Bolzano
23	D	Stefano Marchetti	1.81 m (5 ft 11 in)	86 kg (190 lb)	11 October 1986 (aged 34)	(Italy) Asiago Hockey
24	D	Peter Spornberger	1.86 m (6 ft 1 in)	90 kg (200 lb)	6 January 1999 (aged 22)	(Germany) EHC Freiburg
26	F	Angelo Miceli	1.78 m (5 ft 10 in)	80 kg (180 lb)	1 March 1994 (aged 27)	(Italy) HC Bolzano
29	G	Davide Fadani	1.82 m (6 ft 0 in)	76 kg (168 lb)	3 February 2001 (aged 20)	(Switzerland) HC Lugano
31	G	Damian Clara	1.95 m (6 ft 5 in)	89 kg (196 lb)	13 January 2005 (aged 16)	(Austria) Red Bull Salzburg
32	G	Justin Fazio	1.85 m (6 ft 1 in)	87 kg (192 lb)	3 May 1997 (aged 24)	(Italy) HC Bolzano
37	D	Phil Pietroniro	1.85 m (6 ft 1 in)	80 kg (180 lb)	27 May 1994 (aged 26)	(Italy) SG Cortina
44	D	Gregorio Gios	1.83 m (6 ft 0 in)	79 kg (174 lb)	29 June 1999 (aged 21)	(Italy) SHC Fassa
46	F	Ivan Deluca	1.93 m (6 ft 4 in)	93 kg (205 lb)	28 July 1997 (aged 23)	(Italy) HC Bolzano
53	D	Alex Trivellato	1.89 m (6 ft 2 in)	83 kg (183 lb)	5 January 1993 (aged 28)	(Sweden) Västerås IK
68	D	Sebastiano Soracreppa	1.83 m (6 ft 0 in)	79 kg (174 lb)	12 September 1999 (aged 21)	(Switzerland) HC Thurgau
81	F	Anthony Bardaro	1.78 m (5 ft 10 in)	82 kg (181 lb)	18 September 1992 (aged 28)	(Italy) HC Bolzano
91	F	Marco Rosa	1.82 m (6 ft 0 in)	84 kg (185 lb)	15 January 1982 (aged 39)	(Italy) Asiago Hockey
92	F	Alex Petan – A	1.75 m (5 ft 9 in)	82 kg (181 lb)	2 May 1992 (aged 29)	(Hungary) Fehérvár AV19
93	F	Luca Frigo – A	1.83 m (6 ft 0 in)	90 kg (200 lb)	30 May 1993 (aged 27)	(Italy) HC Bolzano
94	F	Daniel Frank – C	1.87 m (6 ft 2 in)	90 kg (200 lb)	21 March 1994 (aged 27)	(Italy) HC Bolzano
95	F	Marco Magnabosco	1.74 m (5 ft 9 in)	73 kg (161 lb)	12 August 1995 (aged 25)	(Italy) Asiago Hockey

=== Kazakhstan ===
A 28-player roster was announced on 9 May 2021.

Head coach: Yuri Mikhailis

No.	Pos.	Name	Height	Weight	Birthdate	Team
4	D	Yegor Shalapov	1.81 m (5 ft 11 in)	82 kg (181 lb)	27 January 1995 (aged 26)	(Kazakhstan) Barys Nur-Sultan
9	D	Jesse Blacker	1.85 m (6 ft 1 in)	86 kg (190 lb)	19 April 1991 (aged 30)	(Kazakhstan) Barys Nur-Sultan
10	F	Nikita Mikhailis	1.74 m (5 ft 9 in)	75 kg (165 lb)	18 June 1995 (aged 25)	(Kazakhstan) Barys Nur-Sultan
11	F	Artyom Likhotnikov	1.89 m (6 ft 2 in)	100 kg (220 lb)	11 May 1994 (aged 27)	(Kazakhstan) Torpedo Ust-Kamenogorsk
14	F	Curtis Valk	1.75 m (5 ft 9 in)	77 kg (170 lb)	8 February 1993 (aged 28)	(Kazakhstan) Barys Nur-Sultan
15	F	Yegor Petukhov	1.80 m (5 ft 11 in)	75 kg (165 lb)	28 February 1994 (aged 27)	(Kazakhstan) Barys Nur-Sultan
18	F	Pavel Akolzin	1.96 m (6 ft 5 in)	100 kg (220 lb)	25 November 1990 (aged 30)	(Kazakhstan) Barys Nur-Sultan
20	G	Demid Yeremeyev	1.85 m (6 ft 1 in)	90 kg (200 lb)	25 September 1999 (aged 21)	(Kazakhstan) Arystan Temirtau
22	F	Kirill Panyukov	1.85 m (6 ft 1 in)	82 kg (181 lb)	22 May 1997 (aged 23)	(Kazakhstan) Barys Nur-Sultan
23	D	Kirill Polokhov	1.91 m (6 ft 3 in)	91 kg (201 lb)	23 March 1998 (aged 23)	(Russia) HC Tambov
28	D	Valeri Orekhov	1.86 m (6 ft 1 in)	76 kg (168 lb)	17 July 1999 (aged 21)	(Kazakhstan) Barys Nur-Sultan
30	G	Nikita Boyarkin	1.87 m (6 ft 2 in)	80 kg (180 lb)	7 October 1998 (aged 22)	(Kazakhstan) Saryarka Karagandy
31	G	Andrei Shutov	1.88 m (6 ft 2 in)	83 kg (183 lb)	4 March 1998 (aged 23)	(Kazakhstan) Torpedo Ust-Kamenogorsk
44	D	Darren Dietz – A	1.87 m (6 ft 2 in)	91 kg (201 lb)	17 July 1993 (aged 27)	(Kazakhstan) Barys Nur-Sultan
48	F	Roman Starchenko – C	1.78 m (5 ft 10 in)	85 kg (187 lb)	12 May 1986 (aged 35)	(Kazakhstan) Barys Nur-Sultan
49	F	Alexander Shin	1.85 m (6 ft 1 in)	77 kg (170 lb)	21 November 1985 (aged 35)	(Kazakhstan) Torpedo Ust-Kamenogorsk
55	D	Ivan Stepanenko	1.86 m (6 ft 1 in)	94 kg (207 lb)	12 November 1995 (aged 25)	(Kazakhstan) Beibarys Atyrau
58	D	Viktor Svedberg	2.04 m (6 ft 8 in)	108 kg (238 lb)	24 May 1991 (aged 29)	(Kazakhstan) Barys Nur-Sultan
64	F	Arkadiy Shestakov	1.82 m (6 ft 0 in)	83 kg (183 lb)	24 March 1995 (aged 26)	(Kazakhstan) Barys Nur-Sultan
65	D	Samat Daniyar	1.82 m (6 ft 0 in)	72 kg (159 lb)	24 January 1999 (aged 22)	(Kazakhstan) Nomad Nur-Sultan
68	F	Dmitri Gurkov	1.86 m (6 ft 1 in)	75 kg (165 lb)	3 June 1996 (aged 24)	(Kazakhstan) Barys Nur-Sultan
77	F	Sayan Daniyar	1.80 m (5 ft 11 in)	72 kg (159 lb)	5 October 1999 (aged 21)	(Kazakhstan) Nomad Nur-Sultan
84	F	Kirill Savitski	1.83 m (6 ft 0 in)	89 kg (196 lb)	9 March 1996 (aged 25)	(Kazakhstan) Torpedo Ust-Kamenogorsk
85	D	Alexei Maklyukov	1.88 m (6 ft 2 in)	82 kg (181 lb)	19 September 1993 (aged 27)	(Kazakhstan) Barys Nur-Sultan
88	F	Evgeni Rymarev	1.74 m (5 ft 9 in)	73 kg (161 lb)	9 September 1988 (aged 32)	(Russia) Yugra Khanty-Mansiysk
89	F	Anton Sagadeyev	1.80 m (5 ft 11 in)	86 kg (190 lb)	6 September 1993 (aged 27)	(Kazakhstan) Barys Nur-Sultan
95	F	Dmitri Shevchenko	1.96 m (6 ft 5 in)	105 kg (231 lb)	15 December 1995 (aged 25)	(Kazakhstan) Barys Nur-Sultan
96	F	Alikhan Asetov – A	1.86 m (6 ft 1 in)	91 kg (201 lb)	26 August 1996 (aged 24)	(Kazakhstan) Barys Nur-Sultan

=== Latvia ===
The roster was announced on 15 May 2021.

Head coach: Bob Hartley

No.	Pos.	Name	Height	Weight	Birthdate	Team
9	F	Renārs Krastenbergs	1.83 m (6 ft 0 in)	84 kg (185 lb)	26 December 1998 (aged 22)	(Austria) EC VSV
10	F	Lauris Dārziņš – A	1.91 m (6 ft 3 in)	91 kg (201 lb)	28 January 1985 (aged 36)	(Latvia) Dinamo Riga
11	D	Kristaps Sotnieks	1.83 m (6 ft 0 in)	94 kg (207 lb)	29 January 1987 (aged 34)	(Latvia) Dinamo Riga
12	F	Rihards Marenis	1.85 m (6 ft 1 in)	91 kg (201 lb)	18 April 1993 (aged 28)	(Sweden) Kiruna IF
13	D	Gunārs Skvorcovs	1.87 m (6 ft 2 in)	97 kg (214 lb)	13 January 1990 (aged 31)	(Latvia) Dinamo Riga
14	F	Rihards Bukarts	1.80 m (5 ft 11 in)	84 kg (185 lb)	31 December 1995 (aged 25)	(Latvia) Dinamo Riga
15	F	Mārtiņš Karsums	1.77 m (5 ft 10 in)	97 kg (214 lb)	26 February 1986 (aged 35)	(Germany) Krefeld Pinguine
16	F	Kaspars Daugaviņš – C	1.83 m (6 ft 0 in)	97 kg (214 lb)	18 May 1988 (aged 33)	(Russia) HC Vityaz
17	F	Mārtiņš Dzierkals	1.83 m (6 ft 0 in)	84 kg (185 lb)	4 April 1997 (aged 24)	(Latvia) Dinamo Riga
18	F	Rodrigo Ābols	1.93 m (6 ft 4 in)	93 kg (205 lb)	5 January 1996 (aged 25)	(Sweden) Örebro HK
24	F	Miķelis Rēdlihs	1.81 m (5 ft 11 in)	83 kg (183 lb)	1 July 1984 (aged 36)	(Latvia) Olimp/Venta
25	F	Andris Džeriņš – A	1.86 m (6 ft 1 in)	87 kg (192 lb)	14 February 1988 (aged 33)	(Latvia) Dinamo Riga
26	D	Uvis Balinskis	1.82 m (6 ft 0 in)	84 kg (185 lb)	1 August 1996 (aged 24)	(Czech Republic) HC Litvínov
27	D	Oskars Cibuļskis	1.88 m (6 ft 2 in)	97 kg (214 lb)	9 April 1988 (aged 33)	(Czech Republic) HC Litvínov
29	D	Ralfs Freibergs	1.81 m (5 ft 11 in)	82 kg (181 lb)	17 May 1991 (aged 30)	(Czech Republic) HC Oceláři Třinec
32	D	Artūrs Kulda	1.88 m (6 ft 2 in)	96 kg (212 lb)	25 July 1988 (aged 32)	(Germany) Nürnberg Ice Tigers
70	F	Miks Indrašis	1.93 m (6 ft 4 in)	85 kg (187 lb)	30 September 1990 (aged 30)	(Latvia) Dinamo Riga
71	F	Roberts Bukarts	1.82 m (6 ft 0 in)	84 kg (185 lb)	27 June 1990 (aged 30)	(Latvia) Dinamo Riga
72	D	Jānis Jaks	1.83 m (6 ft 0 in)	86 kg (190 lb)	22 August 1995 (aged 25)	(United States) Bakersfield Condors
74	G	Ivars Punnenovs	1.85 m (6 ft 1 in)	85 kg (187 lb)	30 May 1994 (aged 26)	(Switzerland) SCL Tigers
77	D	Kristaps Zīle	1.85 m (6 ft 1 in)	86 kg (190 lb)	24 December 1997 (aged 23)	(Latvia) Dinamo Riga
80	G	Matīss Kivlenieks	1.87 m (6 ft 2 in)	86 kg (190 lb)	26 August 1996 (aged 24)	(United States) Cleveland Monsters
87	F	Gints Meija	1.85 m (6 ft 1 in)	91 kg (201 lb)	4 September 1987 (aged 33)	(Austria) Steinbach Black Wings
81	F	Ronalds Ķēniņš	1.82 m (6 ft 0 in)	91 kg (201 lb)	28 February 1991 (aged 30)	(Switzerland) Lausanne HC
94	D	Kristiāns Rubīns	1.94 m (6 ft 4 in)	96 kg (212 lb)	11 December 1997 (aged 23)	(Canada) Toronto Marlies
95	F	Oskars Batņa	1.95 m (6 ft 5 in)	106 kg (234 lb)	7 May 1995 (aged 26)	(France) Anglet Hormadi
96	F	Māris Bičevskis	1.80 m (5 ft 11 in)	83 kg (183 lb)	3 August 1991 (aged 29)	(Czech Republic) Mladá Boleslav
98	G	Jānis Kalniņš	1.82 m (6 ft 0 in)	87 kg (192 lb)	13 December 1991 (aged 29)	(Finland) Jokerit

=== Norway ===
The roster was announced on 14 May 2021.

Head coach: Petter Thoresen

No.	Pos.	Name	Height	Weight	Birthdate	Team
5	D	Erlend Lesund	1.90 m (6 ft 3 in)	92 kg (203 lb)	11 December 1994 (aged 26)	(Sweden) Rögle BK
6	D	Jonas Holøs – C	1.80 m (5 ft 11 in)	93 kg (205 lb)	27 August 1987 (aged 33)	(Sweden) Linköping HC
8	F	Mathias Trettenes – A	1.80 m (5 ft 11 in)	82 kg (181 lb)	8 November 1993 (aged 27)	(Switzerland) La Chaux-de-Fonds
9	F	Andreas Heier	1.84 m (6 ft 0 in)	88 kg (194 lb)	5 December 1993 (aged 27)	(Norway) Stjernen Hockey
10	F	Ludvig Hoff	1.80 m (5 ft 11 in)	86 kg (190 lb)	16 October 1996 (aged 24)	(Norway) Stavanger Oilers
11	F	Samuel Solem	1.85 m (6 ft 1 in)	93 kg (205 lb)	1 April 1999 (aged 22)	(Sweden) AIK IF
13	F	Sondre Olden	1.94 m (6 ft 4 in)	87 kg (192 lb)	29 August 1992 (aged 28)	(United Kingdom) Sheffield Steelers
15	F	Tommy Kristiansen	1.89 m (6 ft 2 in)	98 kg (216 lb)	26 May 1989 (aged 31)	(Norway) Stavanger Oilers
16	F	Magnus Brekke Henriksen	1.90 m (6 ft 3 in)	85 kg (187 lb)	17 April 1996 (aged 25)	(Norway) Vålerenga Ishockey
17	D	Stefan Espeland	1.84 m (6 ft 0 in)	86 kg (190 lb)	24 March 1989 (aged 32)	(Austria) Red Bull Salzburg
18	F	Tobias Lindström	1.77 m (5 ft 10 in)	92 kg (203 lb)	20 April 1988 (aged 33)	(Norway) Vålerenga Ishockey
19	F	Eirik Salsten	1.84 m (6 ft 0 in)	85 kg (187 lb)	17 June 1994 (aged 26)	(Norway) Storhamar Ishockey
20	F	Mathias Emilio Pettersen	1.80 m (5 ft 11 in)	82 kg (181 lb)	3 April 2000 (aged 21)	(United States) Stockton Heat
21	D	Christian Bull	1.86 m (6 ft 1 in)	90 kg (200 lb)	13 August 1996 (aged 24)	(Germany) Krefeld Pinguine
22	F	Martin Røymark	1.84 m (6 ft 0 in)	86 kg (190 lb)	10 November 1986 (aged 34)	(Norway) Vålerenga Ishockey
24	D	Ole Julian Holm	1.89 m (6 ft 2 in)	92 kg (203 lb)	23 May 2002 (aged 18)	(United States) Cleveland Monsters
29	D	Kristian Østby	1.98 m (6 ft 6 in)	98 kg (216 lb)	30 January 1996 (aged 25)	(Norway) Stavanger Oilers
31	G	Jonas Arntzen	1.91 m (6 ft 3 in)	85 kg (187 lb)	21 November 1997 (aged 23)	(Sweden) Örebro HK
33	G	Henrik Haukeland	1.86 m (6 ft 1 in)	83 kg (183 lb)	6 December 1994 (aged 26)	(Sweden) Färjestad BK
38	G	Henrik Holm	1.85 m (6 ft 1 in)	83 kg (183 lb)	6 September 1990 (aged 30)	(Norway) Stavanger Oilers
40	F	Ken André Olimb	1.79 m (5 ft 10 in)	81 kg (179 lb)	21 January 1989 (aged 32)	(Germany) Düsseldorfer EG
43	D	Max Krogdahl	1.87 m (6 ft 2 in)	95 kg (209 lb)	21 October 1998 (aged 22)	(United Kingdom) Coventry Blaze
46	F	Mathis Olimb – A	1.77 m (5 ft 10 in)	80 kg (180 lb)	1 February 1986 (aged 35)	(Germany) Grizzlys Wolfsburg
49	D	Christian Kåsastul	1.76 m (5 ft 9 in)	86 kg (190 lb)	9 April 1997 (aged 24)	(Sweden) AIK IF
51	F	Mats Rosseli Olsen	1.80 m (5 ft 11 in)	82 kg (181 lb)	29 April 1991 (aged 30)	(Sweden) Frölunda HC
76	D	Emil Lilleberg	1.88 m (6 ft 2 in)	94 kg (207 lb)	2 February 2001 (aged 20)	(Norway) Sparta Warriors
85	F	Michael Haga	1.80 m (5 ft 11 in)	80 kg (180 lb)	10 March 1992 (aged 29)	(Sweden) Djurgårdens IF
93	F	Thomas Valkvæ Olsen	1.86 m (6 ft 1 in)	90 kg (200 lb)	18 May 1993 (aged 28)	(Norway) Frisk Asker

=== United States ===
A 26-player roster was announced on 13 May 2021.

Head coach: Jack Capuano

No.	Pos.	Name	Height	Weight	Birthdate	Team
1	G	Drew Commesso	1.87 m (6 ft 2 in)	82 kg (181 lb)	19 July 2002 (aged 18)	(United States) Boston Univ.
2	D	Ryan Shea	1.85 m (6 ft 1 in)	80 kg (180 lb)	11 February 1997 (aged 24)	(United States) Texas Stars
3	D	Matt Roy – A	1.85 m (6 ft 1 in)	91 kg (201 lb)	1 March 1995 (aged 26)	(United States) Los Angeles Kings
4	D	Connor Mackey	1.88 m (6 ft 2 in)	86 kg (190 lb)	12 September 1996 (aged 24)	(Canada) Calgary Flames
5	D	Adam Clendening	1.83 m (6 ft 0 in)	86 kg (190 lb)	26 October 1992 (aged 28)	(United States) Cleveland Monsters
6	D	Chris Wideman	1.78 m (5 ft 10 in)	86 kg (190 lb)	7 January 1990 (aged 31)	(Russia) Torpedo Nizhny Novgorod
8	D	Matt Tennyson	1.88 m (6 ft 2 in)	93 kg (205 lb)	23 April 1990 (aged 31)	(United States) New Jersey Devils
10	F	Matty Beniers	1.85 m (6 ft 1 in)	79 kg (174 lb)	5 November 2002 (aged 18)	(United States) University of Michigan
11	F	Brian Boyle	1.97 m (6 ft 6 in)	111 kg (245 lb)	18 December 1984 (aged 36)	(United States) Florida Panthers
12	F	Trevor Moore	1.78 m (5 ft 10 in)	84 kg (185 lb)	31 March 1995 (aged 26)	(United States) Los Angeles Kings
16	F	Ryan Donato	1.84 m (6 ft 0 in)	87 kg (192 lb)	9 April 1996 (aged 25)	(United States) San Jose Sharks
18	F	Jack Drury	1.82 m (6 ft 0 in)	79 kg (174 lb)	3 February 2000 (aged 21)	(Sweden) Växjö Lakers
19	F	Jason Robertson	1.91 m (6 ft 3 in)	95 kg (209 lb)	22 July 1999 (aged 21)	(United States) Dallas Stars
21	F	Kevin Rooney	1.88 m (6 ft 2 in)	86 kg (190 lb)	21 May 1993 (aged 28)	(United States) New York Rangers
24	F	Sasha Chmelevski	1.83 m (6 ft 0 in)	85 kg (187 lb)	9 June 1999 (aged 21)	(United States) San Jose Sharks
29	G	Jake Oettinger	1.96 m (6 ft 5 in)	102 kg (225 lb)	18 December 1998 (aged 22)	(United States) Dallas Stars
31	G	Anthony Stolarz	1.96 m (6 ft 5 in)	104 kg (229 lb)	20 January 1994 (aged 27)	(United States) Anaheim Ducks
39	D	Zac Jones	1.78 m (5 ft 10 in)	78 kg (172 lb)	18 October 2000 (aged 20)	(United States) New York Rangers
40	G	Cal Petersen	1.85 m (6 ft 1 in)	83 kg (183 lb)	19 October 1994 (aged 26)	(United States) Los Angeles Kings
43	F	Colin Blackwell – A	1.75 m (5 ft 9 in)	86 kg (190 lb)	28 March 1993 (aged 28)	(United States) New York Rangers
50	F	Eric Robinson	1.88 m (6 ft 2 in)	91 kg (201 lb)	14 June 1995 (aged 25)	(United States) Columbus Blue Jackets
55	D	Matt Hellickson	1.83 m (6 ft 0 in)	83 kg (183 lb)	21 March 1998 (aged 23)	(United States) Binghamton Devils
62	F	Kevin Labanc	1.80 m (5 ft 11 in)	84 kg (185 lb)	12 December 1995 (aged 25)	(United States) San Jose Sharks
72	F	Tage Thompson	2.01 m (6 ft 7 in)	99 kg (218 lb)	30 October 1997 (aged 23)	(United States) Buffalo Sabres
83	F	Conor Garland	1.78 m (5 ft 10 in)	75 kg (165 lb)	11 March 1996 (aged 25)	(United States) Arizona Coyotes
86	D	Christian Wolanin	1.88 m (6 ft 2 in)	84 kg (185 lb)	17 March 1995 (aged 26)	(United States) Los Angeles Kings
89	F	Justin Abdelkader – C	1.87 m (6 ft 2 in)	97 kg (214 lb)	25 February 1987 (aged 34)	(Switzerland) EV Zug
