= 2023 IIHF World Championship Division I =

Ice hockey world championships

Tournament details
- Host countries: United Kingdom; Estonia
- Venues: 2 (in 2 host cities)
- Dates: 29 April – 5 May; 23–29 April
- Teams: 12

The 2023 IIHF World Championship Division I was an international ice hockey tournament run by the International Ice Hockey Federation.

The Group A tournament was held at the National Ice Centre in Nottingham, United Kingdom from 29 April to 5 May and the Group B tournament in Tallinn, Estonia from 23 to 29 April 2023.

In Group A, Great Britain and Poland gained promotion to the Top Division while Lithuania finished last and was relegated. Japan won Group B and got promoted while Serbia was relegated after finishing last.

== Group A tournament ==
2023 IIHF World Championship Division I A

Tournament details
- Host country: Great Britain
- Venue: 1 (in 1 host city)
- Dates: 29 April – 5 May
- Teams: 6

Tournament statistics
- Games played: 15
- Goals scored: 99 (6.6 per game)
- Attendance: 33,765 (2,251 per game)
- Scoring leader: (Poland) Krystian Dziubiński (11 points)

Official website
- Website

=== Participants ===
Team	Qualification
Italy	Placed 15th in the Elite Division in 2022 and was relegated.
Great Britain	Host, placed 16th in the Elite Division in 2022 and was relegated.
Lithuania	Placed 3rd in Division I A in 2022.
South Korea	Placed 4th in Division I A in 2022.
Romania	Placed 5th in Division I A in 2022.
Poland	Placed 1st in Division I B in 2022 and was promoted.

=== Match officials ===
Eight referees and seven linesmen were selected for the tournament.

Referees	Linesmen
(Austria) Christoph Sternat; (Germany) Killian Hinterdobler; (United Kingdom) Andrew Dalton; (Hungary) Attila Nagy; (Norway) Roy Stian Hansen; (Slovenia) Milan Zrnić; (Sweden) Mikael Holm; (Switzerland) Cedric Borga	(Denmark) Nicklas Knosen; (Finland) Jussi Thomann; (Germany) Jonas Merten; (United Kingdom) Ilia Kisil; (Hungary) Norbert Muzsik; (Slovenia) Gašper Zgonc; (Sweden) Andreas Nyqvist

=== Standings ===
Pos	Team	Pld	W	OTW	OTL	L	GF	GA	GD	Pts	Promotion or relegation
1	Great Britain (H)	5	4	1	0	0	24	7	+17	14	Promoted to the 2024 Top Division
2	Poland	5	4	0	1	0	28	9	+19	13	Promoted to the 2024 Top Division
3	Italy	5	3	0	0	2	23	16	+7	9	
4	South Korea	5	2	0	0	3	8	20	−12	6	
5	Romania	5	1	0	0	4	9	26	−17	3	
6	Lithuania	5	0	0	0	5	7	21	−14	0	Relegated to the 2024 Division I B

Source: IIHF
Rules for classification: 1) points; 2) head-to-head points; 3) head-to-head goal difference; 4) head-to-head number of goals scored; 5) result against closest best-ranked team outside tied teams; 6) result against second-best ranked team outside tied teams; 7) seeding before tournament.
(H) Host

=== Results ===
All times are local (UTC+1)

29 April 2023; 12:30	Poland	7–0 (3–0, 3–0, 1–0)	Lithuania	Motorpoint Arena Nottingham, Nottingham; Attendance: 1,352

Game reference

John Murray
Goalies
Mantas Armalis
Referees:
(United Kingdom) Andrew Dalton
(Hungary) Attila Nagy
Linesmen:
(United Kingdom) Ilia Kisil
(Finland) Jussi Thomann

Zygmunt (Wałęga, Paś) – 02:03	1–0
Kruczek (Wajda, Fraszko) – 03:26	2–0
Dziubiński (Wronka, Pasiut) (PP) – 07:02	3–0
Wronka (Fraszko, Pasiut) – 27:23	4–0
Wronka (Pasiut, Fraszko) (PP) – 37:18	5–0
Wronka (Dziubiński, Pasiut) (PP) – 39:47	6–0
Dziubiński (Wronka, Dronia) (PP) – 48:40	7–0

4 min
Penalties
12 min
34
Shots
9

29 April 2023; 16:00	Romania	2–6 (0–2, 1–2, 1–2)	Italy	Motorpoint Arena Nottingham, Nottingham; Attendance: 2,001

Game reference

Patrik Polc
Goalies
Justin Fazio
Referees:
(Norway) Roy Stian Hansen
(Germany) Killian Hinterdobler
Linesmen:
(Denmark) Nicklas Knosen
(Germany) Jonas Merten

	0–1	00:59 – Larkin (Frigo)
	0–2	07:55 – Larkin
	0–3	25:58 – Brunner (Pietroniro)
	0–4	26:51 – Miceli (Tedesco, Insam)
Zs. Molnár (Constantin) – 32:10	1–4
Kovács (Péter, Polc) – 47:20	2–4
	2–5	52:57 – Miceli (Tedesco, Miglioranzi)
	2–6	54:57 – Larkin (Traversa, McNally)

8 min
Penalties
4 min
18
Shots
52

29 April 2023; 19:30	South Korea	0–4 (0–2, 0–1, 0–1)	Great Britain	Motorpoint Arena Nottingham, Nottingham; Attendance: 3,966

Game reference

Matt Dalton
Goalies
Ben Bowns
Referees:
(Austria) Christoph Sternat
(Slovenia) Milan Zrnić
Linesmen:
(Hungary) Norbert Muzsik
(Sweden) Andreas Nyqvist

0–1	01:44 – Lake (Waller, Hammond)
0–2	15:49 – Dowd (Waller, Mosey)
0–3	20:13 – Neilson (Kirk)
0–4	41:35 – Kirk

10 min
Penalties
2 min
17
Shots
35

30 April 2023; 12:30	Lithuania	2–3 (2–1, 0–2, 0–0)	Romania	Motorpoint Arena Nottingham, Nottingham; Attendance: 1,958

Game reference

Mantas Armalis
Goalies
Patrik Polc
Referees:
(Switzerland) Cedric Borga
(Austria) Christoph Sternat
Linesmen:
(Germany) Jonas Merten
(Slovenia) Gašper Zgonc

Krakauskas (Gusevas, Grinius) – 01:09	1–0
Bendžius (Binkulis, Protčenko) – 15:38	2–0
	2–1	16:55 – Kovács (Péter, Rasulov)
	2–2	23:36 – Péter (Borysenko, Filip) (PP)
	2–3	30:07 – Péter (Borysenko, Bors)

6 min
Penalties
6 min
34
Shots
30

30 April 2023; 16:00	Great Britain	5–4 OT (1–1, 2–0, 1–3) (OT: 1–0)	Poland	Motorpoint Arena Nottingham, Nottingham; Attendance: 5,076

Game reference

Ben Bowns
Goalies
John Murray
Referees:
(Germany) Killian Hinterdobler
(Sweden) Mikael Holm
Linesmen:
(Denmark) Nicklas Knosen
(Finland) Jussi Thomann

J. Phillips (Lachowicz) – 01:57	1–0
	1–1	10:06 – Paś (Zygmunt, Kostek)
Neilson (Kirk, Halbert) – 23:36	2–1
Kirk (Neilson, Halbert) (PP) – 33:07	3–1
	3–2	45:25 – Zygmunt (Jeziorski, Wałęga) (PP)
	3–3	54:23 – Wałęga (Ciura, Zygmunt)
Hammond (Mosey, O'Connor) (PP) – 58:30	4–3
	4–4	59:12 – Fraszko (Kolusz, Pasiut) (EA)
Lake (Halbert, Kirk) (PP) – 62:35	5–4

8 min
Penalties
31 min
42
Shots
27

30 April 2023; 19:30	Italy	6–1 (2–0, 1–0, 3–1)	South Korea	Motorpoint Arena Nottingham, Nottingham; Attendance: 1,572

Game reference

Damian Clara
Goalies
Matt Dalton
Referees:
(United Kingdom) Andrew Dalton
(Hungary) Attila Nagy
Linesmen:
(United Kingdom) Ilia Kisil
(Sweden) Andreas Nyqvist

Mantenuto (Pietroniro, Zanetti) – 04:31	1–0
Frigo (Mantenuto, Larkin) (SH) – 14:55	2–0
Larkin (Miceli, Tedesco) – 39:57	3–0
Frigo (Pietroniro) – 45:05	4–0
	4–1	48:17 – Kim K. (Kim Sa.)
McNally (Traversa, Deluca) – 48:26	5–1
Mantenuto (Miglioranzi) (PP) – 50:05	6–1

10 min
Penalties
8 min
29
Shots
19

2 May 2023; 12:30	Romania	2–5 (1–1, 0–2, 1–2)	South Korea	Motorpoint Arena Nottingham, Nottingham; Attendance: 767

Game reference

Patrik Polc
Goalies
Matt Dalton
Referees:
(United Kingdom) Andrew Dalton
(Sweden) Mikael Holm
Linesmen:
(United Kingdom) Ilia Kisil
(Denmark) Nicklas Knosen

	0–1	04:52 – Shin (Park, Lee Yo.) (PP)
Filip (Fodor) – 15:15	1–1
	1–2	24:03 – Kang Y. (Lee D.)
	1–3	36:34 – Jeon (Ahn, Oh)
	1–4	51:52 – Park (Lee Yo., Song) (PP)
	1–5	54:45 – Kim Si. (Lee D., Jeon)
Kovács (Péter, Cășăneanu) – 55:24	2–5

6 min
Penalties
2 min
17
Shots
36

2 May 2023; 16:00	Italy	2–4 (1–1, 0–1, 1–2)	Poland	Motorpoint Arena Nottingham, Nottingham; Attendance: 1,318

Game reference

Justin Fazio
Goalies
John Murray
Referees:
(Norway) Roy Stian Hansen
(Slovenia) Milan Zrnić
Linesmen:
(Hungary) Norbert Muzsik
(Slovenia) Gašper Zgonc

	0–1	05:23 – Michalski (Galant)
Trivellato (Mantenuto) – 06:28	1–1
	1–2	22:10 – Dziubiński (Wronka, Pasiut) (PP)
Tedesco (Spornberger, Miceli) – 26:35	2–2
	2–3	37:06 – Jeziorski (Dziubiński)
	2–4	56:53 – Pasiut (Wronka, Kolusz) (PP)

29 min
Penalties
8 min
31
Shots
23

2 May 2023; 19:30	Great Britain	3–0 (2–0, 0–0, 1–0)	Lithuania	Motorpoint Arena Nottingham, Nottingham; Attendance: 2,606

Game reference

Ben Bowns
Goalies
Mantas Armalis
Referees:
(Switzerland) Cedric Borga
(Germany) Killian Hinterdobler
Linesmen:
(Germany) Jonas Merten
(Sweden) Andreas Nyqvist

Neilson (Mosey) – 01:07	1–0
Dowd (Neilson, Kirk) (PP) – 16:42	2–0
Halbert (Dowd) (ENG) – 58:10	3–0

4 min
Penalties
8 min
24
Shots
28

3 May 2023; 12:30	South Korea	0–7 (0–2, 0–3, 0–2)	Poland	Motorpoint Arena Nottingham, Nottingham; Attendance: 710

Game reference

Matt Dalton
Lee Yeon-seung
Goalies
John Murray
Referees:
(Switzerland) Cedric Borga
(Slovenia) Milan Zrnić
Linesmen:
(United Kingdom) Ilia Kisil
(Hungary) Norbert Muzsik

0–1	09:42 – Łyszczarczyk (Zygmunt, Ciura)
0–2	19:12 – Jeziorski (Ciura, Dziubiński)
0–3	30:50 – Jeziorski (Zygmunt, Wałęga) (PP)
0–4	32:34 – Wałęga (Łyszczarczyk, Paś) (PP)
0–5	39:32 – Dziubiński (Wałęga, Łyszczarczyk) (PP)
0–6	52:19 – Kolusz (Łyszczarczyk, Kruczek)
0–7	53:58 – Dziubiński (PS)

8 min
Penalties
0 min
20
Shots
36

3 May 2023; 16:00	Lithuania	4–6 (1–1, 2–4, 1–1)	Italy	Motorpoint Arena Nottingham, Nottingham; Attendance: 876

Game reference

Elvinas Karla
Goalies
Damian Clara
Referees:
(Sweden) Mikael Holm
(Austria) Christoph Sternat
Linesmen:
(Sweden) Andreas Nyqvist
(Slovenia) Gašper Zgonc

Gintautas (Grinius, Kaleinikovas) – 00:45	1–0
	1–1	10:25 – Zanetti (Frigo, Mantenuto)
	1–2	22:06 – Zanetti (Miglioranzi, Frigo)
	1–3	26:47 – Pietroniro (Trivellato, Tedesco) (PP)
	1–4	32:01 – Hannoun (Miceli, Pietroniro)
Bendžius (Gusevas, Krakauskas) (EA) – 33:39	2–4
Grinius (Kaleinikovas, Noreika) (PP2) – 37:43	3–4
	3–5	39:38 – Pietroniro (Hannoun, Miceli) (PP)
	3–6	47:04 – Mantenuto (Zanetti, Frigo)
Bendžius (Stankius, Čižas) – 48:04	4–6

4 min
Penalties
10 min
30
Shots
35

3 May 2023; 19:30	Great Britain	7–0 (0–0, 3–0, 4–0)	Romania	Motorpoint Arena Nottingham, Nottingham; Attendance: 2,506

Game reference

Ben Bowns
Goalies
Zoltán Tőke
Referees:
(Norway) Roy Stian Hansen
(Hungary) Attila Nagy
Linesmen:
(Germany) Jonas Merten
(Finland) Jussi Thomann

Perlini (Dowd, Kirk) – 30:18	1–0
Kirk (Halbert) (PP) – 32:59	2–0
J. Phillips (Tetlow, Jones) – 34:18	3–0
Curran (Mosey, O'Connor) – 46:16	4–0
Ruopp (Lachowicz, D. Phillips) (PP) – 51:17	5–0
Mosey (Perlini, O'Connor) (PP) – 56:27	6–0
Waller (Ruopp, Neilson) – 57:51	7–0

4 min
Penalties
12 min
43
Shots
13

5 May 2023; 12:30	Poland	6–2 (0–1, 4–0, 2–1)	Romania	Motorpoint Arena Nottingham, Nottingham; Attendance: 1,441

Game reference

Maciej Miarka
David Zabolotny
Goalies
Zoltán Tőke
Referees:
(Sweden) Mikael Holm
(Slovenia) Milan Zrnić
Linesmen:
(Denmark) Nicklas Knosen
(Germany) Jonas Merten

	0–1	09:13 – Péter (Borysenko)
Pasiut (Kolusz, Fraszko) (PP) – 21:42	1–1
Jeziorski (Dziubiński) – 28:53	2–1
Fraszko (Pasiut, Wronka) – 37:26	3–1
Łyszczarczyk (Dziubiński, Ciura) – 38:48	4–1
	4–2	54:20 – Gajdo (Molnár, Yemelianenko)
Dziubiński (Fraszko, Ciura) (ENG) – 58:15	5–2
Wałęga (Zygmunt, Dronia) – 59:24	6–2

0 min
Penalties
2 min
39
Shots
15

5 May 2023; 16:00	Lithuania	1–2 (0–0, 1–1, 0–1)	South Korea	Motorpoint Arena Nottingham, Nottingham; Attendance: 2,078

Game reference

Mantas Armalis
Goalies
Matt Dalton
Referees:
(United Kingdom) Andrew Dalton
(Hungary) Attila Nagy
Linesmen:
(Finland) Jussi Thomann
(Slovenia) Gašper Zgonc

	0–1	20:13 – Shin (Ahn)
Čižas (Jasinevičius, Krakauskas) – 33:47	1–1
	1–2	59:27 – Kim Si. (Shin) (PP) (ENG)

12 min
Penalties
6 min
33
Shots
42

5 May 2023; 19:30	Italy	3–5 (1–1, 2–3, 0–1)	Great Britain	Motorpoint Arena Nottingham, Nottingham; Attendance: 5,538

Game reference

Justin Fazio
Goalies
Ben Bowns
Referees:
(Switzerland) Cedric Borga
(Germany) Killian Hinterdobler
Linesmen:
(Hungary) Norbert Muzsik
(Sweden) Andreas Nyqvist

	0–1	05:40 – Perlini (Hammond, Mosey)
Larkin (Tedesco) (EA) – 11:21	1–1
	1–2	20:59 – Neilson (Dowd)
Petan – 24:34	2–2
	2–3	28:43 – Hammond (Betteridge)
Glira (Frigo, Mantenuto) – 34:29	3–3
	3–4	35:57 – Perlini (Hammond, Kirk)
	3–5	57:50 – Neilson (Kirk) (ENG)

6 min
Penalties
0 min
22
Shots
23

=== Statistics ===
==== Scoring leaders ====
List shows the top skaters sorted by points, then goals.

Player	GP	G	A	Pts	+/−	PIM	POS
(Poland) Krystian Dziubiński	5	6	5	11	+3	0	F
(United Kingdom) Liam Kirk	5	3	7	10	+4	0	F
(Poland) Grzegorz Pasiut	5	2	7	9	+3	2	F
(United Kingdom) Cade Neilson	5	5	3	8	+5	2	F
(Poland) Patryk Wronka	5	5	3	8	+3	2	F
(Italy) Daniel Mantenuto	5	3	4	7	+6	2	F
(Poland) Kamil Wałęga	5	3	4	7	+4	0	F
(Poland) Bartosz Fraszko	5	2	5	7	+4	0	F
(Italy) Luca Frigo	5	2	5	7	+7	0	F
(Poland) Paweł Zygmunt	5	2	5	7	+4	0	F

GP = Games played; G = Goals; A = Assists; Pts = Points; +/− = Plus/Minus; PIM = Penalties in Minutes; POS = Position
Source: IIHF.com

==== Goaltending leaders ====
Only the top five goaltenders, based on save percentage, who have played at least 40% of their team's minutes, are included in this list.

Player	TOI	GA	GAA	SA	Sv%	SO
(United Kingdom) Ben Bowns	302:35	7	1.39	107	93.46	3
(Poland) John Murray	242:30	7	1.73	102	93.14	2
(Italy) Damian Clara	120:00	5	2.50	49	89.80	0
(Lithuania) Mantas Armalis	237:20	13	3.29	127	89.76	0
(Romania) Patrik Polc	180:00	13	4.33	122	89.34	0

TOI = time on ice (minutes:seconds); SA = shots against; GA = goals against; GAA = goals against average; Sv% = save percentage; SO = shutouts
Source: IIHF.com

=== Awards ===
Position	Player
Goaltender	(United Kingdom) Ben Bowns
Defenceman	(Italy) Thomas Larkin
Forward	(Poland) Krystian Dziubiński

== Group B tournament ==
2023 IIHF World Championship Division I B

Tournament details
- Host country: Estonia
- Venue: 1 (in 1 host city)
- Dates: 23–29 April
- Teams: 6

Tournament statistics
- Games played: 15
- Goals scored: 117 (7.8 per game)
- Attendance: 19,336 (1,289 per game)
- Scoring leader: (Ukraine) Olexi Vorona (13 points)

Official website
- Website

=== Participants ===
Team	Qualification
Japan	Placed 2nd in Division I B in 2022.
Ukraine	Placed 3rd in Division I B in 2022.
Estonia	Host, placed 4th in Division I B in 2022.
Serbia	Placed 5th in Division I B in 2022.
China	Placed 1st in Division II A in 2022 and was promoted.
Netherlands	Placed 2nd in Division II A in 2022 and was promoted.

=== Match officials ===
Seven referees and seven linesmen were selected for the tournament.

Referees	Linesmen
(Denmark) Martin Christensen; (Finland) Timo Ruuska; (Germany) Benjamin Hoppe; (Italy) Andrea Moschen; (Poland) Michał Baca; (South Korea) Chae Young-jin; (Ukraine) Andrii Kicha	(Austria) Wolfgang Puff; (Germany) Tobias Schwenk; (Latvia) Renārs Davidonis; (Latvia) Agris Ozoliņš; (Lithuania) Laurynas Stepankevičius; (Norway) Knut Bråten; (Switzerland) Dominik Altmann

=== Standings ===
Pos	Team	Pld	W	OTW	OTL	L	GF	GA	GD	Pts	Promotion or relegation
1	Japan	5	5	0	0	0	29	10	+19	15	Promoted to the 2024 Division I A
2	Ukraine	5	3	0	1	1	35	16	+19	10	
3	China	5	2	1	0	2	19	18	+1	8	
4	Estonia (H)	5	1	1	0	3	13	18	−5	5	
5	Netherlands	5	1	0	1	3	14	31	−17	4	
6	Serbia	5	0	1	1	3	7	24	−17	3	Relegated to the 2024 Division II A

Source: IIHF
Rules for classification: 1) points; 2) head-to-head points; 3) head-to-head goal difference; 4) head-to-head number of goals scored; 5) result against closest best-ranked team outside tied teams; 6) result against second-best ranked team outside tied teams; 7) seeding before tournament.
(H) Host

=== Results ===
All times are local (UTC+3)

23 April 2023; 12:30	Netherlands	1–8 (0–2, 0–2, 1–4)	Japan	Tondiraba Ice Hall, Tallinn; Attendance: 150

Game reference

Ruud Leeuwesteijn
Goalies
Yuta Narisawa
Referees:
(Denmark) Martin Christensen
(Ukraine) Andrii Kicha
Linesmen:
(Norway) Knut Bråten
(Germany) Tobias Schwenk

	0–1	15:33 – Suzuki (K. Otsu)
	0–2	18:05 – Halliday (Osawa, Suzuki)
	0–3	22:09 – Furuhashi (Yoneyama, T. Nakajima)
	0–4	39:38 – T. Nakajima (Hanzawa, Ishida)
	0–5	40:13 – S. Nakajima
	0–6	45:07 – T. Nakajima (Hirano, H. Sato) (PP)
	0–7	45:26 – Hirano (S. Nakajima, Hitosato)
	0–8	57:22 – Irikura (Y. Otsu) (SH)
Hofland (Stempher, Van Nes) – 59:48	1–8

6 min
Penalties
8 min
16
Shots
47

23 April 2023; 16:00	China	5–4 OT (0–2, 4–0, 0–2) (OT: 1–0)	Ukraine	Tondiraba Ice Hall, Tallinn; Attendance: 560

Game reference

Ouban Yongli
Goalies
Eduard Zakharchenko
Bogdan Dyachenko
Referees:
(Poland) Michał Baca
(Germany) Benjamin Hoppe
Linesmen:
(Switzerland) Dominik Altmann
(Latvia) Renārs Davidonis

	0–1	06:19 – Vorona (Mazur, Merezhko) (PP)
	0–2	19:15 – Vorona (Peresunko, Merezhko) (PP)
Zhou (Fu S., Luo) – 20:49	1–2
Ye (Wang, Fu J.) (PP) – 26:34	2–2
Wang (Ruian, Guo) – 35:47	3–2
Jieke – 38:45	4–2
	4–3	46:33 – Merezhko (Peresunko, Vorona) (PP)
	4–4	55:49 – Vorona (Trakht, Merezhko) (PP)
Jian (Ye, Wang) – 62:32	5–4

8 min
Penalties
31 min
30
Shots
37

23 April 2023; 19:30	Serbia	1–2 GWS (0–0, 0–1, 1–0) (OT: 0–0) (SO: 0–1)	Estonia	Tondiraba Ice Hall, Tallinn; Attendance: 1,564

Game reference
Arsenije Ranković	Goalies	Villem-Henrik Koitmaa	Referees: (Italy) Andrea Moschen (Finland) Timo Ruuska; Linesmen: (Latvia) Agris Ozoliņš (Austria) Wolfgang Puff
/ 0–1 / 31:37 – Slessarevski (Kiik); Đumić (Dragović, Ranković) – 42:42 / 1–1			Referees: (Italy) Andrea Moschen (Finland) Timo Ruuska; Linesmen: (Latvia) Agris Ozoliņš (Austria) Wolfgang Puff
Đumić; Popović (miss); Leštarić (miss); Dragović (miss); Novaković (miss)	Shootout	Rooba; Kombe; (miss) Embrich; (miss) Viitanen; (miss) Arrak	Referees: (Italy) Andrea Moschen (Finland) Timo Ruuska; Linesmen: (Latvia) Agris Ozoliņš (Austria) Wolfgang Puff
6 min	Penalties	8 min	Referees: (Italy) Andrea Moschen (Finland) Timo Ruuska; Linesmen: (Latvia) Agris Ozoliņš (Austria) Wolfgang Puff
15	Shots	54	Referees: (Italy) Andrea Moschen (Finland) Timo Ruuska; Linesmen: (Latvia) Agris Ozoliņš (Austria) Wolfgang Puff

24 April 2023; 12:30	Japan	5–2 (1–2, 2–0, 2–0)	China	Tondiraba Ice Hall, Tallinn; Attendance: 280

Game reference

Yuta Narisawa
Goalies
Sun Zehao
Referees:
(Poland) Michał Baca
(Finland) Timo Ruuska
Linesmen:
(Norway) Knut Bråten
(Latvia) Renārs Davidonis

	0–1	04:00 – Fu J. (Jieke) (PP)
Hanzawa (T. Nakajima, Furuhashi) – 05:23	1–1
	1–2	16:45 – Jian (Yan J., Ruian)
Hitosato (H. Sato) – 35:15	2–2
T. Nakajima (Osawa, S. Nakajima) (PP) – 37:30	3–2
Osawa (Y. Otsu, K. Otsu) – 43:20	4–2
T. Nakajima (Irikura) (EN) – 59:22	5–2

14 min
Penalties
6 min
27
Shots
34

24 April 2023; 16:00	Ukraine	7–0 (0–0, 2–0, 5–0)	Serbia	Tondiraba Ice Hall, Tallinn; Attendance: 428

Game reference

Bogdan Dyachenko
Goalies
Akim Padalitsa
Referees:
(South Korea) Chae Young-jin
(Italy) Andrea Moschen
Linesmen:
(Austria) Wolfgang Puff
(Lithuania) Laurynas Stepankevičius

Trakht (Mazur, Pangelov-Yuldashev) – 26:27	1–0
Mazur (Vorona, Peresunko) (PP) – 28:47	2–0
Mazur (Merezhko, Andreikiv) – 44:28	3–0
Denyskin (Fadyeyv, Pangelov-Yuldashev) (PP) – 47:06	4–0
Peresunko (Mazur, Trakht) (PP) – 49:39	5–0
Borodai (Merezhko, Sysak) – 54:19	6–0
Merezhko (Korenchuk, Nimenko) – 57:37	7–0

6 min
Penalties
35 min
66
Shots
10

24 April 2023; 19:30	Estonia	4–2 (1–1, 0–0, 3–1)	Netherlands	Tondiraba Ice Hall, Tallinn; Attendance: 1,349

Game reference

Conrad Mölder
Goalies
Martijn Oosterwijk
Referees:
(Denmark) Martin Christensen
(Ukraine) Andrii Kicha
Linesmen:
(Switzerland) Dominik Altmann
(Germany) Tobias Schwenk

	0–1	04:12 – Van Nes
Viitanen (Linde) – 19:26	1–1
Kombe (Ossipov, Kulintsev) – 44:09	2–1
Rooba (Aleksandrov) – 50:00	3–1
	3–2	53:57 – Van Gorp (Stempher, Van Nes) (PP, EA)
Viitanen (Aleksandrov) (EN) – 58:43	4–2

8 min
Penalties
10 min
56
Shots
12

26 April 2023; 12:30	Netherlands	7–2 (3–0, 3–2, 1–0)	China	Tondiraba Ice Hall, Tallinn; Attendance: 215

Game reference

Ruud Leeuwesteijn
Goalies
Ouban Yongli
Referees:
(South Korea) Chae Young-jin
(Italy) Andrea Moschen
Linesmen:
(Latvia) Agris Ozoliņš
(Lithuania) Laurynas Stepankevičius

Van Soest (De Ruiter, Jongmans) – 07:55	1–0
Van Soest (De Ruiter, Huisman) – 10:41	2–0
Collard (De Bonth) (PP) – 15:44	3–0
Van Gorp – 32:08	4–0
	4–1	33:06 – Fu S. (Zhou, Liu)
	4–2	38:21 – Jian (Jieke, Ye) (PP)
Schoningh (De Bonth, Doop) – 38:30	5–2
Van Nes (Van Gorp) – 39:44	6–2
Hofland (Van Nes) – 52:26	7–2

10 min
Penalties
8 min
16
Shots
40

26 April 2023; 16:00	Japan	8–3 (2–0, 1–2, 5–1)	Serbia	Tondiraba Ice Hall, Tallinn; Attendance: 254

Game reference

Yutaka Fukufuji
Goalies
Arsenije Ranković
Akim Padalitsa
Referees:
(Germany) Benjamin Hoppe
(Ukraine) Andrii Kicha
Linesmen:
(Switzerland) Dominik Altmann
(Latvia) Renārs Davidonis

Hirano (Suzuki, Halliday) – 01:51	1–0
Takagi (Irikura, K. Sato) – 02:34	2–0
	2–1	23:14 – Popović (Đumić, Podunavac) (PP)
	2–2	26:42 – Podunavac (Dragović, Đumić) (PP)
Hirano (S. Nakajima) – 26:55	3–2
	3–3	40:46 – Dragović (Novaković, Podunavac)
Hitosato (Osawa) – 44:21	4–3
T. Nakajima (Hanzawa, Furuhashi) – 46:05	5–3
Hirano (Hitosato, Yamada) – 46:54	6–3
T. Nakajima (Osawa, S. Nakajima) (PP) – 53:15	7–3
S. Nakajima (H. Sato, Hirano) (PP) – 55:16	8–3

10 min
Penalties
8 min
51
Shots
11

26 April 2023; 19:30	Ukraine	7–4 (1–1, 4–1, 2–2)	Estonia	Tondiraba Ice Hall, Tallinn; Attendance: 3,001

Game reference

Eduard Zakharchenko
Goalies
Villem-Henrik Koitmaa
Referees:
(Poland) Michał Baca
(Denmark) Martin Christensen
Linesmen:
(Norway) Knut Bråten
(Germany) Tobias Schwenk

	0–1	11:37 – Parras (Kiik, Puzakov)
Korenchuk (Nimenko, Vorona) – 17:54	1–1
Pangelov-Yuldashev (Korenchuk, Peresunko) (PP) – 21:37	2–1
Lialka (Mazur, Merezhko) – 31:29	3–1
	3–2	33:44 – Rooba (Novikov)
Pangelov-Yuldashev (Fadyeyv) – 39:12	4–2
Korenchuk (Nimenko, Vorona) – 38:58	5–2
Mazur (Vorona, Peresunko) (PP) – 42:28	6–2
	6–3	44:33 – Aleksandrov (Ossipov, Potšinok)
Trakht (Mazur, Peresunko) – 44:54	7–3
	7–4	48:20 – Rooba (Embrich) (PP)

6 min
Penalties
8 min
37
Shots
18

27 April 2023; 12:30	China	5–0 (2–0, 2–0, 1–0)	Serbia	Tondiraba Ice Hall, Tallinn; Attendance: 123

Game reference

Ouban Yongli
Goalies
Arsenije Ranković
Referees:
(South Korea) Chae Young-jin
(Denmark) Martin Christensen
Linesmen:
(Switzerland) Dominik Altmann
(Norway) Knut Braten

Fu S. (Fu J., Luo) – 08:10	1–0
Jieke (Ruian, Fu J.) – 14:28	2–0
Jian (Ye, Jieke) – 23:15	3–0
Luo – 39:37	4–0
Liu (Luo, Zhou) – 50:01	5–0

4 min
Penalties
12 min
58
Shots
15

27 April 2023; 16:00	Ukraine	14–2 (4–1, 6–1, 4–0)	Netherlands	Tondiraba Ice Hall, Tallinn; Attendance: 729

Game reference

Bogdan Dyachenko
Goalies
Martijn Oosterwijk
Referees:
(Poland) Michal Baca
(Germany) Benjamin Hoppe
Linesmen:
(Latvia) Renars Davidonis
(Latvia) Agris Ozolins

Korenchuk (Nimenko, Vorona) – 01:49	1–0
Korenchuk (Merezhko) – 08:08	2–0
Trakht (Merezhko) – 11:53	3–0
	3–1	12:39 – Verkiel (Hessels, Van Gestel) (PP)
Nimenko (Korenchuk, Merezhko) – 18:52	4–1
Trakht (Sysak, Peresunko) – 20:32	5–1
Merezhko (Mazur) (PP) – 22:37	6–1
Ruzhnikov (Kutsevych, Hrebenyk) – 22:59	7–1
Denyskin (Korenchuk, Pangelov-Yuldashev) (PP) – 31:38	8–1
	8–2	36:02 – Van Nes (Stempher, Van Soest) (PP)
Panchenko (Ruzhnikov) – 36:11	9–2
Vorona (Trakht, Peresunko) (PP) – 38:04	10–2
Denyskin (Lialka, Pangelov-Yuldashev) (PP) – 44:34	11–2
Korenchuk (Vorona, Dyachenko) – 49:27	12–2
Trakht (Peresunko, Mazur) – 50:17	13–2
Trakht – 58:04	14–2

6 min
Penalties
12 min
60
Shots
11

27 April 2023; 19:30	Estonia	1–3 (0–1, 1–2, 0–0)	Japan	Tondiraba Ice Hall, Tallinn; Attendance: 2,432

Game reference

Conrad Mölder
Goalies
Yuta Narisawa
Referees:
(Latvia) Uldis Bušs
(Ukraine) Andrii Kicha
Linesmen:
(Austria) Wolfgang Puff
(Lithuania) Laurynas Stepankevičius

	0–1	06:38 – Hitosato (Hirano, S. Nakajima)
	0–2	24:47 – Halliday (K. Sato, Y. Otsu)
Viitanen (Embrich) – 24:56	1–2
	1–3	35:43 – Hirano (S. Nakajima, Hitosato)

6 min
Penalties
10 min
20
Shots
27

29 April 2023; 12:30	Serbia	3–2 GWS (1–1, 0–1, 1–0) (OT: 0–0) (SO: 1–0)	Netherlands	Tondiraba Ice Hall, Tallinn; Attendance: 315

Game reference

Arsenije Ranković
Goalies
Ruud Leeuwesteijn
Referees:
(South Korea) Chae Young-jin
(Ukraine) Andrii Kicha
Linesmen:
(Switzerland) Dominik Altmann
(Latvia) Agris Ozoliņš

	0–1	08:13 – Van Nes (Hofland, Muller)
Đumić (Podunavac, Popović) – 10:95	1–1
	1–2	29:16 – Verkiel (Huisman, De Ruiter)
Vučurević (Leštarić, Gvozdenović) – 52:32	2–2

Vučurević
Đumić
Španjević
Shootout
(miss) Verkiel
(miss) Van Nes
(miss) Huisman
12 min
Penalties
10 min
27
Shots
40

29 April 2023; 16:00	Estonia	2–5 (0–3, 1–0, 1–2)	China	Tondiraba Ice Hall, Tallinn; Attendance: 4,066

Game reference

Conrad Mölder
Goalies
Ouban Yongli
Referees:
(Latvia) Uldis Bušs
(Denmark) Martin Christensen
Linesmen:
(Norway) Knut Bråten
(Austria) Wolfgang Puff

	0–1	01:13 – Fu S. (Zhang P.)
	0–2	07:04 – Luo (Fu J., Fu S.)
	0–3	15:37 – Liu (Wang, Luo) (PP)
Parras (Kiik, Novikov) (SH) – 28:06	1–3
	1–4	40:25 – Fu S. (Fu J., Jieke)
	1–5	44:45 – Fu S. (Fu J., Jieke) (PP2)
Arrak (Puzakov, Potšinok) (PP) – 54:52	2–5

37 min
Penalties
10 min
28
Shots
30

29 April 2023; 19:30	Japan	5–3 (2–0, 2–0, 1–3)	Ukraine	Tondiraba Ice Hall, Tallinn; Attendance: 3,870

Game reference

Yuta Narisawa
Goalies
Bogdan Dyachenko
Eduard Zakharchenko
Referees:
(Poland) Michał Baca
(Germany) Benjamin Hoppe
Linesmen:
(Latvia) Renārs Davidonis
(Germany) Tobias Schwenk

Suzuki (Osawa) – 07:58	1–0
Hirano (H. Sato) (PP) – 19:29	2–0
Hirano (Sato, S. Nakajima) (PP) – 29:04	3–0
Takagi (Irikura, Halliday) – 29:25	4–0
K. Otsu – 40:46	5–0
	5–1	45:12 – Vorona (Trakht, Merezhko) (PP)
	5–2	52:45 – Liaka (Andreikiv)
	5–3	56:33 – Korenchuk (Vorona, Zakharchenko)

8 min
Penalties
29 min
29
Shots
33

=== Statistics ===
==== Scoring leaders ====
List shows the top skaters sorted by points, then goals.

Player	GP	G	A	Pts	+/−	PIM	POS
(Ukraine) Olexi Vorona	5	5	8	13	+6	0	F
(Ukraine) Igor Merezhko	5	3	10	13	+7	4	D
(Japan) Yushiroh Hirano	5	7	3	10	+6	4	F
(Ukraine) Illia Korenchuk	5	6	4	10	+6	4	F
(Ukraine) Danil Trakht	5	6	4	10	+4	0	F
(Ukraine) Vadym Mazur	5	3	7	10	+7	0	F
(Ukraine) Oleksandr Peresunko	5	1	9	10	+4	2	F
(Japan) Shogo Nakajima	5	2	7	9	+6	4	F
(Japan) Teruto Nakajima	5	6	2	8	+3	2	F
(China) Fu Jiang	5	2	6	8	+4	2	F

GP = Games played; G = Goals; A = Assists; Pts = Points; +/− = Plus/Minus; PIM = Penalties in Minutes; POS = Position
Source: IIHF.com

==== Goaltending leaders ====
Only the top five goaltenders, based on save percentage, who have played at least 40% of their team's minutes, are included in this list.

Player	TOI	GA	GAA	SA	Sv%	SO
(Japan) Yuta Narisawa	240:00	7	1.75	103	93.20	0
(Serbia) Arsenije Ranković	214:51	12	3.35	158	92.41	0
(Netherlands) Ruud Leeuwesteijn	185:00	12	3.89	113	89.38	0
(China) Ouban Yongli	221:02	11	2.99	89	87.64	1
(Estonia) Conrad Mölder	177:40	10	3.38	69	85.51	0

TOI = time on ice (minutes:seconds); SA = shots against; GA = goals against; GAA = goals against average; Sv% = save percentage; SO = shutouts
Source: IIHF.com

=== Awards ===
Position	Player
Goaltender	(Japan) Yuta Narisawa
Defenceman	(Ukraine) Ihor Merezhko
Forward	(Japan) Yushiroh Hirano
