= Embrich =

Embrich is a surname. Notable people with the surname include:

- Erik Embrich (born 1997), Finnish ice hockey player
- Irina Embrich (born 1980), Estonian fencer

== See also ==
- Embricho (disambiguation)
