= Embricho =

Embrico, Embricho or Embrich may refer to:

- Embricho (died 891), bishop of Regensburg
- Embrich, abbot of Einsiedeln Abbey (1026–1051)
- Embrico (died 1077), bishop of Augsburg
- Embrico of Mainz (late 11th century), writer
- Embricho (died 1146), bishop of Würzburg
- Embrichonen, family of counts of the Rheingau (11th–13th centuries)

== See also ==
- Embrich
