= Thomas Galimberti =

Italian ice hockey player

- Born: 12 November 2003 (age 21); Bolzano, Italy
- Height: 1.85 m (6 ft 1 in)
- Weight: 80 kg (176 lb; 12 st 8 lb)
- Position: Forward
- Shoots: Left
- U20 SM-sarja team: Lahti Pelicans
- National team: Italy
- Playing career: 2020–present

Thomas Galimberti (born 12 November 2003) is an Italian ice hockey player for Lahti Pelicans and the Italian national team.

He represented Italy at the 2021 IIHF World Championship.
