= Sebastiano Soracreppa =

Italian ice hockey player

- Born: 12 September 1999 (age 25); Bolzano, Italy
- Height: 1.83 m (6 ft 0 in)
- Weight: 79 kg (174 lb; 12 st 6 lb)
- Position: Defence/Forward
- Shoots: Left
- SL team Former teams: HC Thurgau; HC Fassa; Alleghe Hockey
- National team: Italy
- NHL draft: Undrafted
- Playing career: 2016–present

Sebastiano Soracreppa (born 12 September 1999) is an Italian ice hockey player for HC Thurgau and the Italian national team.

He represented Italy at the 2021 IIHF World Championship.
