= Magnus Brekke Henriksen =

- Born: 17 April 1996 (age 28); Lørenskog, Norway
- Height: 1.90 m (6 ft 3 in)
- Weight: 85 kg (187 lb; 13 st 5 lb)
- Position: Centre
- Shoots: Left
- ELT team Former teams: Vålerenga Ishockey; Lørenskog IK
- National team: Norway
- NHL draft: Undrafted
- Playing career: 2015–present

Magnus Brekke Henriksen (born 17 April 1996) is a Norwegian ice hockey player for Vålerenga Ishockey and the Norwegian national team.

He represented Norway at the 2021 IIHF World Championship.
