= Mike Hammond (ice hockey) =

British ice hockey player (1990–2023)

- Born: 21 February 1990 Brighton, East Sussex, England
- Died: 19 July 2023 (aged 33) Shawnigan Lake, British Columbia, Canada
- Height: 1.78 m (5 ft 10 in)
- Weight: 82 kg (181 lb; 12 st 13 lb)
- Position: Forward
- Shot: Right
- Played for: Cincinnati Cyclones; Brampton Beast; Braehead Clan; Manchester Storm; Lausitzer Füchse; Odense Bulldogs; Frederikshavn White Hawks; Coventry Blaze; Hannover Scorpions; Nottingham Panthers
- National team: Great Britain
- NHL draft: Undrafted
- Playing career: 2015–2023

Michael Hammond (21 February 1990 – 19 July 2023) was a British professional ice hockey centre. Between 2015 and 2023, he played for 10 teams across the ECHL, Elite Ice Hockey League, DEL2, Metal Ligaen, and Oberliga. Hammond was also a member of the Great Britain men's national ice hockey team.

== Early life ==
Hammond was born on 21 February 1990 in Brighton, England. As a child, Hammond and his family moved to Canada, where he played minor ice hockey with the Juan de Fuca Orcas.

== Career ==
=== Junior ===
Hammond began playing junior ice hockey with the Victoria Cougars of the Vancouver Island Junior Hockey League (VIJHL). With 98 points in 48 regular season games, Hammond led the VIJHL in scoring during the 2005-06 season and took the Cougars to a championship title.

=== Professional ===
Hammond previously played for German Oberliga side Hannover Scorpions.

He represented Great Britain at the 2019 IIHF World Championship and the 2021 IIHF World Championship.

== Death ==
Hammond died in a single-vehicle road traffic collision near Shawnigan Lake, British Columbia, on 19 July 2023. He was 33.

== Career statistics ==
=== Regular season and playoffs ===
			Regular season					Playoffs
Season	Team	League	GP	G	A	Pts	PIM	GP	G	A	Pts	PIM
2006–07	Victoria Cougars	VIJHL	48	40	58	98	22	—	—	—	—	—
2006–07	Kelowna Rockets	WHL	1	0	0	0	0	—	—	—	—	—
2007-08	Victoria Grizzlies	BCHL	47	14	17	31	6	—	—	—	—	—
2008–09	Victoria Grizzlies	BCHL	9	2	5	7	2	—	—	—	—	—
2008–09	Victoria Cougars	VIJHL	6	2	6	8	4	—	—	—	—	—
2009–10	Victoria Cougars	VIJHL	11	9	16	25	14	—	—	—	—	—
2009–10	Cowichan Valley Capitals	BCHL	46	27	41	68	16	5	0	4	4	12
2010–11	Cowichan Valley Capitals	BCHL	40	30	36	66	30	—	—	—	—	—
2010–11	Salmon Arm Silverbacks	BCHL	17	9	18	27	8	15	9	9	18	10
2011–12	Lakehead Thunderwolves	CIS	28	9	18	27	12	—	—	—	—	—
2012–13	Lakehead Thunderwolves	CIS	28	11	19	30	10	2	0	2	2	2
2013–14	Lakehead Thunderwolves	CIS	28	13	21	34	14	—	—	—	—	—
2014–15	Lakehead Thunderwolves	CIS	27	15	24	39	8	—	—	—	—	—
2015–16	Cincinnati Cyclones	ECHL	26	3	1	4	2	—	—	—	—	—
2015–16	Brampton Beast	ECHL	19	4	7	11	4	—	—	—	—	—
2016–17	Braehead Clan	EIHL	43	25	21	46	6	—	—	—	—	—
2017–18	Manchester Storm	EIHL	56	32	51	83	10	2	1	4	5	2
2018–19	Manchester Storm	EIHL	53	18	57	75	16	—	—	—	—	—
2019–20	Lausitzer Füchse	DEL2	48	18	49	67	10	—	—	—	—	—
2020–21	Odense Bulldogs	DEN	20	9	13	22	9	—	—	—	—	—
2020–21	Frederikshavn White Hawks	DEN	12	4	8	12	2	7	0	5	5	2
2020–21	Coventry Blaze	EIHL	14	6	16	22	0	—	—	—	—	—
2021–22	Hannover Scorpions	DEL3	49	30	60	90	0	12	5	13	18	4
2022–23	Nottingham Panthers	EIHL	51	13	25	38	14	4	1	4	5	0
EIHL totals			217	94	170	264	46	6	2	8	10	2

=== International ===
Year	Team	Event	Result	GP	G	A	Pts	PIM
2018	Great Britain	WC-D1	17th	5	0	2	2	0
2019	Great Britain	WC	13th	7	4	0	4	4
2020	Great Britain	OGQ	DNQ	3	0	2	2	0
2021	Great Britain	WC	14th	7	2	2	4	0
2023	Great Britain	WC D1A	17th	5	2	3	5	0
Senior totals				27	8	9	17	4

== International goals ==
No.	Date	Venue	Opponent	Score	Result	Competition
1.	11 May 2019	Košice, Slovakia	Germany	1–1	1–3	2019 IIHF World Championship
2.	15 May 2019	Košice, Slovakia	United States	1–1	3–6	2019 IIHF World Championship
3.	18 May 2019	Košice, Slovakia	Slovakia	1–3	1–7	2019 IIHF World Championship
4.	20 May 2019	Košice, Slovakia	France	2–3	4–3 (OT)	2019 IIHF World Championship
5.	25 May 2021	Riga, Latvia	Denmark	2–2	2–3 (OT)	2021 IIHF World Championship
6.	26 May 2021	Riga, Latvia	Belarus	4–1	4–3	2021 IIHF World Championship
7.	30 April 2023	Nottingham, Great Britain	Poland	4–3	5–4 (OT)	2023 IIHF World Championship Division I
8.	5 May 2023	Nottingham, Great Britain	Italy	3–2	5–3	2023 IIHF World Championship Division I
