= Angelo Miceli =

Canadian-born Italian ice hockey player

- Born: 3 January 1994 (age 32) Montreal, Quebec, Canada
- Height: 5 ft 10 in (178 cm)
- Weight: 176 lb (80 kg; 12 st 8 lb)
- Position: Forward
- Shoots: Left
- ICEHL team Former teams: Asiago; St. John's IceCaps; Texas Stars; HC Bolzano; Sheffield Steelers
- National team: Italy
- NHL draft: Undrafted
- Playing career: 2015–present

Angelo Miceli (born 1 March 1994) is a Canadian-born Italian professional ice hockey player who plays for Asiago in the ICE Hockey League (ICEHL). Internationally he has played for the Italian national team.

He represented Italy at the 2019 IIHF World Championship.
