= Erik Embrich =

Finnish ice hockey player

- Born: February 23, 1997 (age 28) Helsinki, Finland
- Height: 6 ft 0 in (183 cm)
- Weight: 185 lb (84 kg; 13 st 3 lb)
- Position: Forward
- Shoots: Left
- team Former teams: Dunaújvárosi Acélbikák; Ässät; Jokerit; HC Nové Zámky; Dunaújvárosi Acélbikák
- National team: Estonia
- Playing career: 2016–present

Erik Embrich (born February 23, 1997) is a Finnish-born Estonian professional ice hockey forward. He is currently playing for Dunaújvárosi Acélbikák.

Embrich began his career with HIFK's academy from 2012 to 2015 before moving to Ässät. He played eleven games for Ässät during the 2016–17 Liiga season where he registered one assist. On May 2, 2017, Embrich signed a two-way contract with Jokerit of the Kontinental Hockey League. He would however play just one league game and one playoff game for the team as he spent most of his tenure with their co-operation team, Kiekko-Vantaa of Mestis.

On August 13, 2019, Embrich signed a contract with TUTO Hockey of Mestis. On August 4, 2020, Embrich moved to Slovakia to sign for HC Nové Zámky of the Tipos Extraliga.

== Personal life ==
Embrich is of Estonian descent through his father and Russian descent through his mother. His brother Riho is also an ice hockey player.
